= Colorado Republican Party =

Colorado affiliate of the Republican Party

- Chairperson: Craig Steiner
- Senate Leader: Cleave Simpson
- House Leader: Jarvis Caldwell
- Headquarters: Greenwood Village, Colorado
- Membership (2025): ▼940,271
- Ideology: Conservatism
- National affiliation: Republican Party
- Colors: Red
- United States Senate: 0 / 2
- United States House of Representatives: 4 / 8
- Government of Colorado: 0 / 5
- Colorado Senate: 12 / 35
- Colorado House of Representatives: 22 / 65
- Colorado State Board of Education: 4 / 9
- University of Colorado Board of Regents: 4 / 9

Election symbol

Website
- www.cologop.org

The Colorado Republican Party is the state affiliate of the Republican Party in the U.S. state of Colorado. The party's headquarters is located in Greenwood Village, Colorado.

The Republican Party was dominant in the state as recently as the mid-2000s; however, it has declined over the subsequent decades. After the 2020 elections, Republicans held the smallest amount of political power in the state government since World War II. This decline has been attributed to various factors, including the party moving too far right for the state, changing demographics, mismanaged campaign money, internal party divisions, a better organized Democratic Party, and the unpopularity of Donald Trump in the state.

The party fared even poorer in the 2022 elections, in which Democrats swept every statewide office by a double-digit margin, expanded their majority in the state's U.S. House delegation, and further expanded their supermajorities in both chambers of the legislature. Since 2023, the party has faced revenue loss and party infighting, with the party veering further towards the far-right and overall further decline of influence in the state.

== History ==
=== 2010s ===
Ted Cruz won all of Colorado's delegates during the 2016 presidential primaries. Colorado's delegation to the 2016 Republican National Convention stagged a walkout as part of the Never Trump movement. However, Ken Buck and other members of the delegation later became Trump supporters after initially opposing him.

According to Frank McNulty, fringe candidates began winning in safe Republican seats in the 2010s. Republicans in Colorado shifted rightward following the election of Trump. From 2018 to 2020, Republicans lost all of their statewide offices, except for the at-large Board of Regents seat held by Heidi Ganahl. Between 1984 and 2016, the Republicans had more registered voters than the Democrats. In 2020, the Republicans lost control of the Regents of the University of Colorado for the first time in 41 years.

Patrick Neville was elected minority leader in the state house in 2016, which gave him control of the caucus' bank account. Neville renamed the account to Values First Colorado and registered it under his brother Joe Neville. The previous vendor was fired and replaced with Rearden Strategic, which was run by Joe. $207,800 was given to Rearden Strategic from 2017 to 2020, and two other committees managed by Joe, Citizens for Secure Borders IEC and Take Back Colorado, were given $274,200 and $545,000 respectively. Representative Larry Liston stated that it was embarrassing for those who contributed funds and Representative Lois Landgraf was critical of the lack of oversight and not supporting "appropriate candidates".

=== 2020s ===
Since Joe Biden defeated Donald Trump in the 2020 presidential election, elements of the Colorado GOP and its voter base have espoused support for Trump's false claims of election fraud. While top Colorado Republicans have defended Colorado's local elections, they have cast doubt on the validity of the election results in other states or stayed silent on Trump's allegations of fraud. On December 7, 2020, a group of Republicans requested to the Speaker of the House KC Becker that a committee be formed on "election integrity" to conduct an audit of the Dominion Voting Systems used in Colorado in spite of no evidence of issues. The request was rejected, with Becker criticizing it as "a dangerous stunt" and a promotion of "debunked conspiracy theories."

Also in December, Colorado congressional Republicans supported a lawsuit aimed to overturn the election results. On January 6, 2021, congressional Republicans from Colorado objected to certification of the results, with Lauren Boebert and Doug Lamborn objecting to certification of the results.

The party performed poorly in the 2022 elections; Democrats won every statewide office by double digits, expanded their numbers in the state's U.S. House delegation, and further expanded their majorities in both chambers of the legislature. In the aftermath of the heavily lopsided results, Republican state representative Colin Larson lamented that "Colorado Republicans need to take this and learn the lesson that the party is dead. This was an extinction-level event."

In 2023, former state representative Dave Williams was elected to chair the state's Republican Party; he has been noted for promoting false claims of election fraud. Since 2023, the party has faced a significant loss of funding, an increase in infighting and party division, controversial leadership, the party veering further to the right, and a further decrease of influence within the state.

In March 2025, former Routt County treasurer Brita Horn was elected chairperson of the party.

In February 2026, more than half of the state's central committee convened and passed a resolution expressing "no confidence" in chairwoman Britta Horn's leadership. Horn responded by calling the meeting "illegal."

== Current elected officials ==
After the 2022 Colorado elections, the Colorado Republican Party controls none of the statewide offices and holds minorities in the Colorado Senate and House of Representatives. Republicans currently hold half of the state's U.S. House delegation, having erased the Democrats' majority after the 2024 elections when Gabe Evans defeated incumbent Democrat Yadira Caraveo.

=== Members of Congress ===
==== U.S. Senate ====
- None

Both of Colorado's U.S. Senate seats have been held by Democrats since 2021. Cory Gardner was the last Republican to represent Colorado in the U.S. Senate. First elected in 2014, Gardner lost his bid for a second term in 2020 to John Hickenlooper who has held the seat since.

==== U.S. House of Representatives ====
| District | Member | Photo |
|---|---|---|
| 3rd | Jeff Hurd | |
| 4th | Lauren Boebert | |
| 5th | Jeff Crank | |
| 8th | Gabe Evans | |

=== Statewide offices ===
- None.

Republicans have not won a statewide office since 2016, when Heidi Ganahl narrowly won the at-large seat on the University of Colorado Board of Regents.

=== Legislative leadership ===
- Senate Minority Leader: Cleave Simpson
- House Minority Leader: Jarvis Caldwell

== Election results ==
=== Presidential ===
Colorado Republican Party presidential election results
| Election | Presidential ticket | Votes | Vote % | Electoral votes | Result |
|---|---|---|---|---|---|
| 1876 | Rutherford B. Hayes/William A. Wheeler | No popular vote | | 3 / 3 | Won |
| 1880 | James A. Garfield/Chester A. Arthur | 27,450 | 51.26% | 3 / 3 | Won |
| 1884 | James G. Blaine/John A. Logan | 39,514 | 54.25% | 3 / 3 | Lost |
| 1888 | Benjamin Harrison/Levi P. Morton | 50,772 | 55.22% | 3 / 3 | Won |
| 1892 | Benjamin Harrison/Whitelaw Reid | 38,620 | 41.13% | 0 / 4 | Lost |
| 1896 | William McKinley/Garret Hobart | 26,271 | 13.86% | 0 / 4 | Won |
| 1900 | William McKinley/Theodore Roosevelt | 93,072 | 42.04% | 0 / 4 | Won |
| 1904 | Theodore Roosevelt/Charles W. Fairbanks | 134,661 | 55.26% | 5 / 5 | Won |
| 1908 | William Howard Taft/James S. Sherman | 123,693 | 46.88% | 0 / 5 | Won |
| 1912 | William Howard Taft/Nicholas M. Butler | 58,386 | 21.88% | 0 / 6 | Lost |
| 1916 | Charles E. Hughes/Charles W. Fairbanks | 102,308 | 34.75% | 0 / 6 | Lost |
| 1920 | Warren G. Harding/Calvin Coolidge | 173,248 | 59.32% | 6 / 6 | Won |
| 1924 | Calvin Coolidge/Charles G. Dawes | 195,171 | 57.02% | 6 / 6 | Won |
| 1928 | Herbert Hoover/Charles Curtis | 253,872 | 64.72% | 6 / 6 | Won |
| 1932 | Herbert Hoover/Charles Curtis | 189,617 | 41.43% | 0 / 6 | Lost |
| 1936 | Alf Landon/Frank Knox | 181,267 | 37.09% | 0 / 6 | Lost |
| 1940 | Wendell Willkie/Charles L. McNary | 279,576 | 50.92% | 6 / 6 | Lost |
| 1944 | Thomas E. Dewey/John W. Bricker | 268,731 | 53.21% | 6 / 6 | Lost |
| 1948 | Thomas E. Dewey/Earl Warren | 239,714 | 46.52% | 0 / 6 | Lost |
| 1952 | Dwight D. Eisenhower/Richard Nixon | 379,782 | 60.27% | 6 / 6 | Won |
| 1956 | Dwight D. Eisenhower/Richard Nixon | 394,479 | 59.49% | 6 / 6 | Won |
| 1960 | Richard Nixon/Henry Cabot Lodge Jr. | 402,242 | 54.63% | 6 / 6 | Lost |
| 1964 | Barry Goldwater/William E. Miller | 296,767 | 38.19% | 0 / 6 | Lost |
| 1968 | Richard Nixon/Spiro Agnew | 409,345 | 50.46% | 6 / 6 | Won |
| 1972 | Richard Nixon/Spiro Agnew | 597,189 | 62.61% | 7 / 7 | Won |
| 1976 | Gerald Ford/Bob Dole | 584,367 | 54.05% | 7 / 7 | Lost |
| 1980 | Ronald Reagan/George H. W. Bush | 652,264 | 55.07% | 7 / 7 | Won |
| 1984 | Ronald Reagan/George H. W. Bush | 821,818 | 63.44% | 8 / 8 | Won |
| 1988 | George H. W. Bush/Dan Quayle | 728,177 | 53.06% | 8 / 8 | Won |
| 1992 | George H. W. Bush/Dan Quayle | 562,850 | 35.87% | 0 / 8 | Lost |
| 1996 | Bob Dole/Jack Kemp | 691,848 | 45.80% | 8 / 8 | Lost |
| 2000 | George W. Bush/Dick Cheney | 883,745 | 50.75% | 8 / 8 | Won |
| 2004 | George W. Bush/Dick Cheney | 1,101,255 | 51.69% | 9 / 9 | Won |
| 2008 | John McCain/Sarah Palin | 1,073,629 | 44.71% | 0 / 9 | Lost |
| 2012 | Mitt Romney/Paul Ryan | 1,185,243 | 46.13% | 0 / 9 | Lost |
| 2016 | Donald Trump/Mike Pence | 1,202,484 | 43.25% | 0 / 9 | Lost |
| 2020 | Donald Trump/Mike Pence | 1,364,607 | 41.90% | 0 / 9 | Lost |
| 2024 | Donald Trump/JD Vance | 1,377,441 | 43.14% | 0 / 10 | Lost |

=== Gubernatorial ===
Colorado Republican Party gubernatorial election results
| Election | Gubernatorial candidate/ticket | Votes | Vote % | Result |
|---|---|---|---|---|
| 1876 | John Long Routt | 14,154 | 51.53% | Won ✓ |
| 1878 | Frederick Walker Pitkin | 14,308 | 49.98% | Won ✓ |
| 1880 | Frederick Walker Pitkin | 28,465 | 53.28% | Won ✓ |
| 1882 | E. L. Campbell | 28,820 | 46.91% | Lost ✗ |
| 1884 | Benjamin Harrison Eaton | 33,845 | 50.74% | Won ✓ |
| 1886 | William H. Meyer | 26,816 | 45.55% | Lost ✗ |
| 1888 | Job Adams Cooper | 49,490 | 53.84% | Won ✓ |
| 1890 | John Long Routt | 41,827 | 50.11% | Won ✓ |
| 1892 | Joseph Helm | 38,806 | 41.79% | Lost ✗ |
| 1894 | Albert McIntire | 93,502 | 51.95% | Won ✓ |
| 1896 | G. H. Allen | 23,945 | 12.66% | Lost ✗ |
| 1898 | Henry R. Wolcott | 51,051 | 34.17% | Lost ✗ |
| 1900 | Frank C. Goudy | 96,027 | 43.53% | Lost ✗ |
| 1902 | James Hamilton Peabody | 87,684 | 46.94% | Won ✓ |
| 1904 | James Hamilton Peabody | 113,754 | 46.80% | Lost ✗ |
| 1906 | Henry Augustus Buchtel | 92,602 | 45.59% | Won ✓ |
| 1908 | Jesse Fuller McDonald | 118,953 | 45.16% | Lost ✗ |
| 1910 | John B. Stephen | 97,691 | 43.48% | Lost ✗ |
| 1912 | Clifford C. Parks | 63,061 | 23.73% | Lost ✗ |
| 1914 | George Alfred Carlson | 129,096 | 48.67% | Won ✓ |
| 1916 | George Alfred Carlson | 117,723 | 41.28% | Lost ✗ |
| 1918 | Oliver Henry Shoup | 112,693 | 51.15% | Won ✓ |
| 1920 | Oliver Henry Shoup | 174,488 | 59.55% | Won ✓ |
| 1922 | Benjamin Griffith | 134,353 | 48.29% | Lost ✗ |
| 1924 | Clarence Morley | 178,078 | 51.92% | Won ✓ |
| 1926 | Oliver Henry Shoup | 116,756 | 38.11% | Lost ✗ |
| 1928 | William L. Boatright | 114,067 | 31.85% | Lost ✗ |
| 1930 | Robert F. Rockwell | 124,164 | 38.06% | Lost ✗ |
| 1932 | James D. Parriott | 183,258 | 40.78% | Lost ✗ |
| 1934 | Nathan C. Warren | 162,791 | 39.91% | Lost ✗ |
| 1936 | Charles M. Armstrong | 210,614 | 43.65% | Lost ✗ |
| 1938 | Ralph Lawrence Carr | 296,671 | 59.50% | Won ✓ |
| 1940 | Ralph Lawrence Carr | 296,671 | 54.37% | Won ✓ |
| 1942 | John Charles Vivian | 193,501 | 56.23% | Won ✓ |
| 1944 | John Charles Vivian | 259,862 | 52.40% | Won ✓ |
| 1946 | Leon Lavington | 160,483 | 47.89% | Lost ✗ |
| 1948 | David A. Hamil | 168,928 | 33.67% | Lost ✗ |
| 1950 | Daniel I. J. Thornton | 236,472 | 52.43% | Won ✓ |
| 1952 | Daniel I. J. Thornton | 349,924 | 57.08% | Won ✓ |
| 1954 | Donald G. Brotzman | 227,335 | 46.44% | Lost ✗ |
| 1956 | Donald G. Brotzman | 313,950 | 48.66% | Lost ✗ |
| 1958 | Palmer Burch | 228,643 | 41.59% | Lost ✗ |
| 1962 | John Arthur Love | 349,342 | 56.67% | Won ✓ |
| 1966 | John Arthur Love | 356,730 | 54.05% | Won ✓ |
| 1970 | John Arthur Love/John D. Vanderhoof | 350,690 | 52.46% | Won ✓ |
| 1974 | John D. Vanderhoof/Ted L. Strickland | 378,907 | 45.71% | Lost ✗ |
| 1978 | Ted L. Strickland/Hank Brown | 317,292 | 38.53% | Lost ✗ |
| 1982 | John Fuhr/Robert E. Denier | 302,740 | 31.67% | Lost ✗ |
| 1986 | Ted L. Strickland/Kathy Arnold | 434,420 | 41.03% | Lost ✗ |
| 1990 | John Andrews/Lillian Bickel | 358,403 | 35.43% | Lost ✗ |
| 1994 | Bruce D. Benson/Bob Schaeffer | 432,042 | 38.70% | Lost ✗ |
| 1998 | Bill Owens/Joe Rogers | 648,202 | 49.06% | Won ✓ |
| 2002 | Bill Owens/Jane Norton | 884,583 | 62.62% | Won ✓ |
| 2006 | Bob Beauprez/Janet Rowland | 625,886 | 40.2% | Lost ✗ |
| 2010 | Dan Maes/Tambor Williams | 199,792 | 11.1% | Lost ✗ |
| 2014 | Bob Beauprez/Jill Repella | 938,195 | 45.95% | Lost ✗ |
| 2018 | Walker Stapleton/Lang Sias | 1,080,801 | 42.80% | Lost ✗ |
| 2022 | Heidi Ganahl/Danny Moore | 983,040 | 39.18% | Lost ✗ |
| 2026 | Victor Marx/George Markert | 887,672 | 33.28% | Lost ✗ |

== See also ==
- Republican Party (United States)
- Political party strength in Colorado
- Ryan Call (party official) - Party chairman from 2011-2015

== Works cited ==
- Burness, Alex (December 11, 2021). "Election denialism and far-right activism sit firmly within the Colorado GOP". The Denver Post. Archived from the original on December 11, 2021.
- Frank, John (July 18, 2016). "Colorado delegates walk out in anti-Trump effort at Republican National Convention". The Denver Post. Archived from the original on September 22, 2020.
- Frank, John (August 25, 2020). "How Colorado Republicans transformed from "Never Trump" to Donald Trump loyalists in four years". The Colorado Sun. Archived from the original on September 2, 2020.
- Paul, Jesse; Frank, John (November 20, 2018). "Colorado Republicans, reeling from 2018 losses, wonder: Is it us or is it Trump?". The Colorado Sun. Archived from the original on May 27, 2025.
- Paul, Jesse (November 12, 2020). "Where do Colorado Republicans go from here?". The Colorado Sun. Archived from the original on November 12, 2020.
- Swanson, Conrad; Burness, Alex (December 20, 2020). "What happened to the Colorado Republican Party?". The Denver Post. Archived from the original on May 27, 2025.
