= Colorado Democratic Party =

Colorado affiliate of the Democratic Party

- Chairperson: Shad Murib
- Governor of Colorado: Jared Polis
- Lieutenant Governor: Dianne Primavera
- Senate President: James Coleman
- House Speaker: Julie McCluskie
- Headquarters: Denver, Colorado
- Membership (2025): ▼999,152
- National affiliation: Democratic Party
- Colors: Blue
- United States Senate: 2 / 2
- United States House of Representatives: 4 / 8
- Government of Colorado: 5 / 5
- Colorado Senate: 23 / 35
- Colorado House of Representatives: 43 / 65
- Colorado State Board of Education: 5 / 9
- University of Colorado Board of Regents: 5 / 9

Election symbol

Website
- www.coloradodems.org

The Colorado Democratic Party is the affiliate of the Democratic Party in the U.S. state of Colorado. Shad Murib serves as its chair.

The governing body of the party is the State Central Committee, which consists of the chair and vice chair of the county Democratic Party in each of Colorado's 64 counties and "bonus" members for larger counties. In each odd-numbered year, county parties elect officers in February followed by the state party which elects its officers in March.

The party once held weak power in the state, but growing support increased its popularity. Currently, It is the dominant party in the state, controlling both of the state's U.S. Senate seats and all statewide executive offices, including the governorship. The Democrats also have a supermajority in the Colorado House of Representatives, and hold half of its U.S. House districts.

== Responsibilities ==
The Colorado Democratic Party manages and oversees statewide coordinated campaigns and is responsible for arranging and staging the state convention in Presidential years and the state assembly every two years. The state convention selects delegates to the Democratic National Convention and Colorado's Presidential electors. The state's assemblies designate candidates for statewide, congressional, district attorneys, state legislative and county offices, including the offices of Governor, Attorney-General, Secretary of State, Treasurer, C.U. Regent At-Large, Board of Education Director At Large, and United States Senator. The party also adopts its platform at the state convention.

== Current elected officials ==
Democrats hold all of the state's five statewide offices, a majority in the Colorado House of Representatives and a majority in the Colorado Senate. The party also holds both of the state's U.S. Senate seats and four of its eight U.S. House of Representatives seats.

=== Members of Congress ===
==== U.S. Senate ====
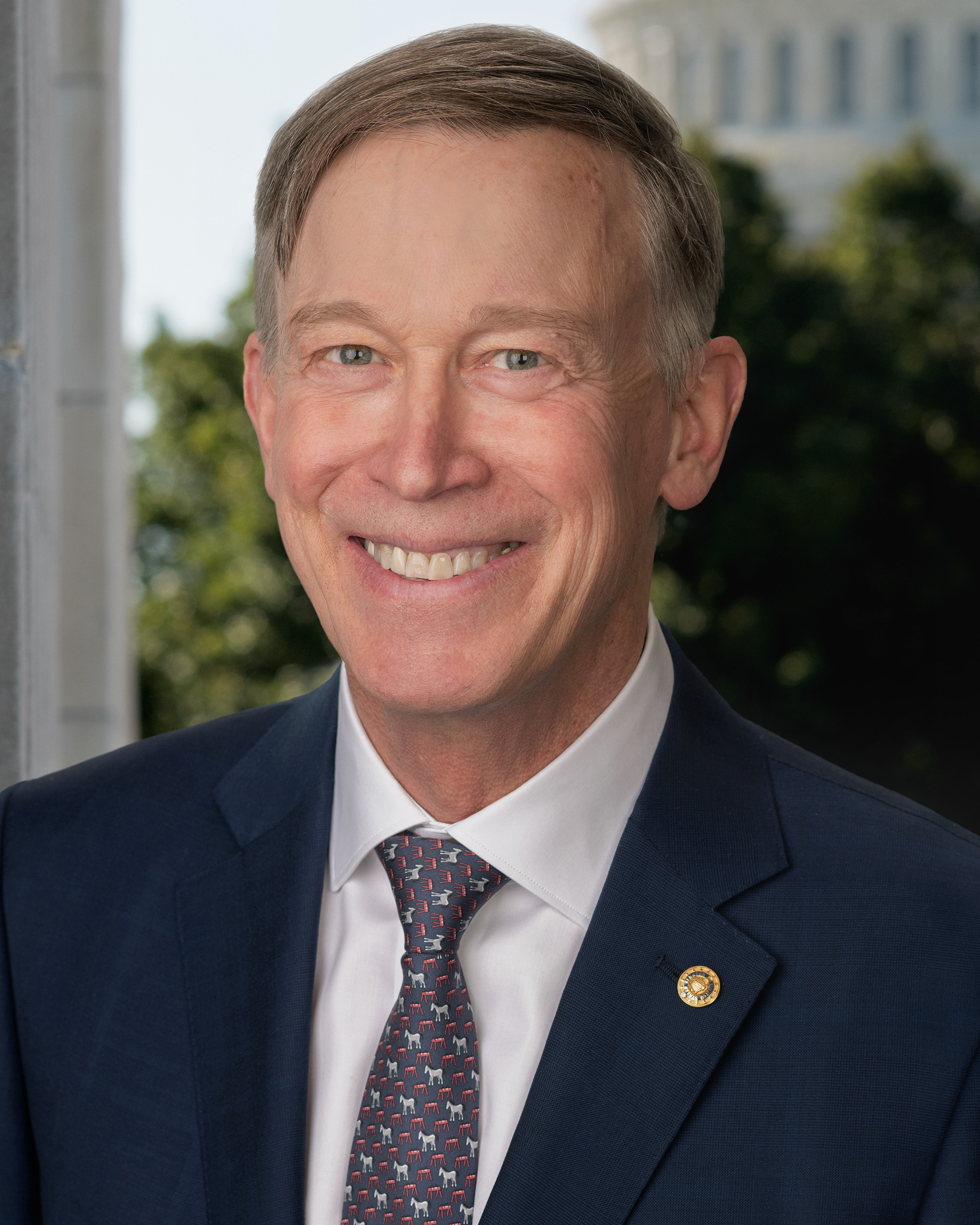
Junior U.S. Senator John Hickenlooper

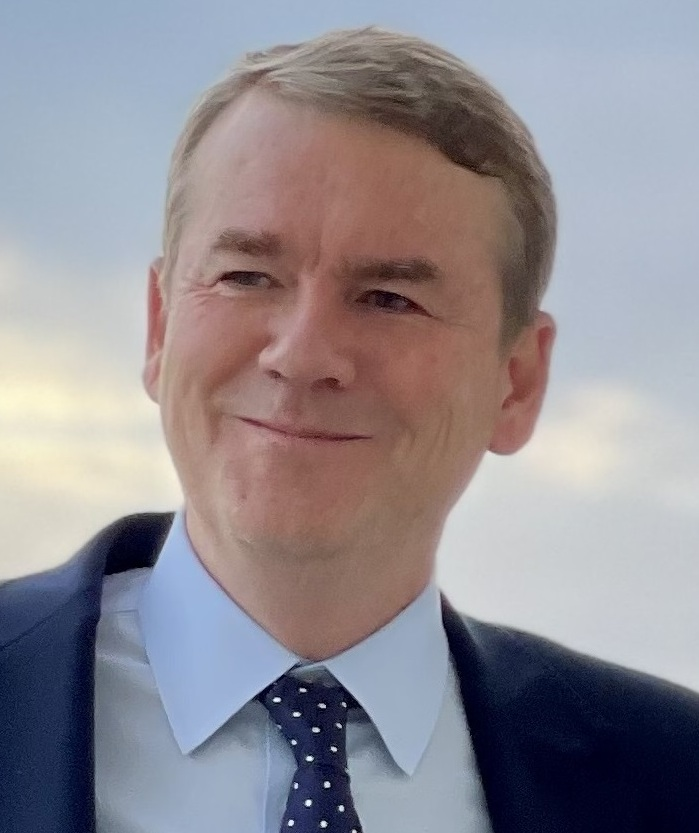
Senior U.S. Senator Michael Bennet

==== U.S. House of Representatives ====
District	Member	Photo
1st	Diana DeGette	
1st	Melat Kiros (elect)	
2nd	Joe Neguse	
4th	Eileen Laubacher (elect)	
5th	Jessica Killin (elect)	
6th	Jason Crow	
7th	Brittany Pettersen	
8th	Manny Rutinel (elect)	

=== Statewide offices ===
Photo	Office	Officeholder
	Governor	Jared Polis
	Lieutenant Governor	Dianne Primavera
	Attorney General → Governor-elect	Phil Weiser
	Lieutenant Governor-elect	Lesley Dahlkemper
	Secretary of State → Attorney General-elect	Jena Griswold
	Secretary of State-elect	Amanda Gonzalez
	Treasurer	Dave Young
	Treasurere-elect	Jeff Bridges

=== Legislative leadership ===
- President of the Senate: James Coleman
- Senate Majority Leader: Robert Rodriguez
- Speaker of the House: Julie McCluskie
- House Majority Leader: Monica Duran

=== Municipal ===
The following Democrats hold prominent mayoralties in Colorado:

- Denver: Mike Johnston (1)
- Fort Collins: Jennifer Arndt (4)
- Boulder: Aaron Brockett

== Election results ==
=== Federal ===
==== Presidential ====
Colorado Democratic Party presidential election results
Election	Presidential ticket	Votes	Vote %	Electoral votes	Result
1876	Samuel J. Tilden/Thomas A. Hendricks	No popular vote		0 / 3	Lost
1880	Winfield S. Hancock/William H. English	24,647	46.03%	0 / 3	Lost
1884	Grover Cleveland/Thomas A. Hendricks	27,723	41.68%	0 / 3	Won
1888	Grover Cleveland/Allen G. Thurman	37,549	40.84%	0 / 3	Lost
1892	State party endorsed James B. Weaver/James G. Field (Populist)	N/A	N/A	0 / 4	Won
1896	William Jennings Bryan/Arthur Sewall	161,005	84.95%	4 / 4	Lost
1900	William Jennings Bryan/Adlai E. Stevenson	122,733	55.43%	4 / 4	Lost
1904	Alton B. Parker/Henry G. Davis	100,105	41.08%	0 / 5	Lost
1908	William Jennings Bryan/John W. Kern	126,644	48.00%	5 / 5	Lost
1912	Woodrow Wilson/Thomas R. Marshall	114,232	42.80%	6 / 6	Won
1916	Woodrow Wilson/Thomas R. Marshall	178,816	60.74%	6 / 6	Won
1920	James M. Cox/Franklin D. Roosevelt	104,936	35.93%	0 / 6	Lost
1924	John W. Davis/Charles W. Bryan	75,238	21.98%	0 / 6	Lost
1928	Al Smith/Joseph T. Robinson	156,319	33.94%	0 / 6	Lost
1932	Franklin D. Roosevelt/John N. Garner	250,877	54.81%	6 / 6	Won
1936	Franklin D. Roosevelt/John N. Garner	295,021	60.37%	6 / 6	Won
1940	Franklin D. Roosevelt/Henry A. Wallace	265,554	48.37%	0 / 6	Won
1944	Franklin D. Roosevelt/Harry S. Truman	234,331	46.40%	0 / 6	Won
1948	Harry S. Truman/Alben W. Barkley	267,288	51.88%	6 / 6	Won
1952	Adlai Stevenson/John Sparkman	245,504	38.96%	0 / 6	Lost
1956	Adlai Stevenson/Estes Kefauver	263,997	39.81%	0 / 6	Lost
1960	John F. Kennedy/Lyndon B. Johnson	330,629	44.91%	0 / 6	Won
1964	Lyndon B. Johnson/Hubert Humphrey	476,024	61.27%	6 / 6	Won
1968	Hubert Humphrey/Edmund Muskie	335,174	41.32%	0 / 6	Lost
1972	George McGovern/Sargent Shriver	329,980	34.59%	0 / 7	Lost
1976	Jimmy Carter/Walter Mondale	460,353	42.58%	0 / 7	Won
1980	Jimmy Carter/Walter Mondale	367,973	31.07%	0 / 7	Lost
1984	Walter Mondale/Geraldine Ferraro	454,974	35.12%	0 / 8	Lost
1988	Michael Dukakis/Lloyd Bentsen	621,453	45.28%	0 / 8	Lost
1992	Bill Clinton/Al Gore	629,681	40.13%	8 / 8	Won
1996	Bill Clinton/Al Gore	671,152	44.43%	0 / 8	Won
2000	Al Gore/Joe Lieberman	738,227	42.39%	0 / 8	Lost
2004	John Kerry/John Edwards	1,001,732	47.02%	0 / 9	Lost
2008	Barack Obama/Joe Biden	1,288,633	53.66%	9 / 9	Won
2012	Barack Obama/Joe Biden	1,323,101	51.49%	9 / 9	Won
2016	Hillary Clinton/Tim Kaine	1,338,870	48.16%	9 / 9	Lost
2020	Joe Biden/Kamala Harris	1,804,352	55.40%	9 / 9	Won
2024	Kamala Harris/Tim Walz	1,728,159	54.13%	10 / 10	Lost

=== Federal ===
==== U.S. Senate ====
Class 2
Year	Candidate	Votes	%	Result
1972	Floyd Haskell	457,545	49.41%	Won ✓
1978	Floyd Haskell	330,148	40.30%	Lost ✗
1984	Nancy Dick	449,327	34.62%	Lost ✗
1990	Josie Heath	425,746	41.66%	Lost ✗
1996	Tom Strickland	667,600	45.74%	Lost ✗
2002	Tom Strickland	648,130	45.77%	Lost ✗
2008	Mark Udall	1,231,049	52.80%	Won ✓
2014	Mark Udall	944,203	46.26%	Lost ✗
2020	John Hickenlooper	1,731,114	53.50%	Won ✓
2026	John Hickenlooper	1,629,507	60.50%	Won ✓

Class 3
Year	Candidate	Votes	%	Result
1974	Gary Hart	471,691	57.23%	Won ✓
1980	Gary Hart	590,501	50.33%	Won ✓
1986	Tim Wirth	529,449	49.91%	Won ✓
1992	Ben Nighthorse Campbell	803,725	51.78%	Won ✓
1998	Dottie Lamm	464,754	35.02%	Lost ✗
2004	Ken Salazar	1,081,188	51.33%	Won ✓
2010	Michael Bennet	854,685	48.08%	Won ✓
2016	Michael Bennet	1,370,710	49.97%	Won ✓
2022	Michael Bennet	1,397,170	55.88%	Won ✓

==== U.S. House ====
Election	Votes	%	Seats (CO)	±	%
2016	1,263,791	46.78	3 / 7	0	0.03
2018	1,343,211	53.44	4 / 7	▲1	6.66
2020	1,679,052	53.05	4 / 7	0	0.39
2022	1,365,427	55.23	5 / 8	▲1	2.18
2024	1,667,163	54.28	4 / 8	▼1	0.95
2026	1,588,704	60.07	7 / 8	▲3	5.79

=== State ===
==== Executive offices ====
Governor
Election	Gubernatorial candidate/ticket	Votes	Vote %	Result
1876	Bela M. Hughes	13,316	48.47%	Lost ✗
1878	William A. H. Loveland	11,535	40.30%	Lost ✗
1880	John S. Hough	23,547	44.08%	Lost ✗
1882	James Benton Grant	31,375	51.07%	Won ✓
1884	Alva Adams	30,743	46.09%	Lost ✗
1886	Alva Adams	29,234	49.66%	Won ✓
1888	Thomas M. Patterson	39,197	42.64%	Lost ✗
1890	Caldwell Yeaman	35,359	42.36%	Lost ✗
1892	Joseph H. Maupin	8,944	9.63%	Lost ✗
1894	Charles S. Thomas	8,337	4.63%	Lost ✗
1896	Alva Adams	87,387	46.22%	Won ✓
1898	Charles S. Thomas	93,966	62.89%	Won ✓
1900	James Bradley Orman	118,647	53.78%	Won ✓
1902	E. C. Stimson	80,727	43.21%	Lost ✗
1904	Alva Adams	123,092	50.64%	Won ✓
1906	Alva Adams	74,416	36.63%	Lost ✗
1908	John F. Shafroth	130,141	49.41%	Won ✓
1910	John F. Shafroth	114,676	51.04%	Won ✓
1912	Elias M. Ammons	114,044	42.91%	Won ✓
1914	Thomas M. Patterson	90,640	34.17%	Lost ✗
1916	Julius Caldeen Gunter	151,912	53.27%	Won ✓
1918	Thomas J. Tynan	102,397	46.47%	Lost ✗
1920	James M. Collins	108,738	37.11%	Lost ✗
1922	William Ellery Sweet	138,098	49.64%	Won ✓
1924	William Ellery Sweet	151,041	44.04%	Lost ✗
1926	Billy Adams	183,342	59.84%	Won ✓
1928	Billy Adams	240,160	67.05%	Won ✓
1930	Billy Adams	197,067	60.41%	Won ✓
1932	Edwin C. Johnson	257,188	57.23%	Won ✓
1934	Edwin C. Johnson	237,026	58.11%	Won ✓
1936	Teller Ammons	263,311	54.57%	Won ✓
1938	Teller Ammons	199,562	40.02%	Lost ✗
1940	George E. Saunders	245,292	44.96%	Lost ✗
1942	Homer Bedford	149,402	43.41%	Lost ✗
1944	Roy Phelix Best	236,086	47.60%	Lost ✗
1946	William Lee Knous	174,604	52.11%	Won ✓
1948	William Lee Knous	332,752	66.33%	Won ✓
1950	Walter Walford Johnson	212,976	47.22%	Lost ✗
1952	John W. Metzger	260,044	42.42%	Lost ✗
1954	Edwin C. Johnson	262,205	53.56%	Won ✓
1956	Stephen McNichols	331,283	51.34%	Won ✓
1958	Stephen McNichols	321,165	58.41%	Won ✓
1962	Stephen McNichols	262,890	42.64%	Lost ✗
1966	Robert Lee Knous	287,132	43.50%	Lost ✗
1970	Mark Anthony Hogan/Charles Grant	302,432	45.24%	Lost ✗
1974	Richard Lamm/George Brown	441,199	53.22%	Won ✓
1978	Richard Lamm/Nancy Dick	483,985	58.76%	Won ✓
1982	Richard Lamm/Nancy Dick	627,960	65.69%	Won ✓
1986	Roy Romer/Mike Callihan	616,325	58.20%	Won ✓
1990	Roy Romer/Mike Callihan	626,032	61.89%	Won ✓
1994	Roy Romer/Gail Schoettler	619,205	55.47%	Won ✓
1998	Gail Schoettler/Bernie Buescher	639,905	48.43%	Lost ✗
2002	Rollie Heath/Bill Thiebaut	475,373	33.65%	Lost ✗
2006	Bill Ritter/Barbara O'Brien	888,095	56.99%	Won ✓
2010	John Hickenlooper/Joe Garcia	915,436	51.05%	Won ✓
2014	John Hickenlooper/Joe Garcia	1,006,433	49.30%	Won ✓
2018	Jared Polis/Dianne Primavera	1,348,888	53.42%	Won ✓
2022	Jared Polis/Dianne Primavera	1,468,481	58.53%	Won ✓
2026	Phil Weiser/Lesley Dahlkemper	1,628,795	61.07%	Won ✓

Attorney General
Year	Candidate	Votes	%	Result
2014	Don Quick	826,182	42.4%	Lost ✗
2018	Phil Weiser	1,285,464	51.58%	Won ✓
2022	Phil Weiser	1,349,133	54.74%	Won ✓
2026	Jena Griswold	1,541,575	59.0%	Won ✓

Secretary of State
Year	Candidate	Votes	%	Result
2014	Joe Neguse	886,043	44.98%	Lost ✗
2018	Jena Griswold	1,313,716	52.70%	Won ✓
2022	Jena Griswold	1,369,040	55.10%	Won ✓
2026	Amanda Gonzalez	1,580,110	60.2%	Won ✓

== See also ==
- Buie Seawell, former CDP chair
- Colorado Republican Party
- Political party strength in Colorado
- Politics of Colorado
- Elections in Colorado
- Government of Colorado
