= 2026 Colorado State Board of Education election =

- November 3, 2026

3 of 9 seats on the Colorado State Board of Education 5 seats needed for a majority
Party	Democratic	Republican
Current seats	5	4
Seats needed	Steady	▲1

The 2026 Colorado State Board of Education election was held on November 3, 2026, to elect three of nine members to the Colorado State Board of Education. Primary elections were held on June 30.

== District 1 ==
=== Democratic primary ===
==== Candidates ====
===== Nominee =====
- Lisa Escarcega, incumbent board member

==== Results ====
Democratic primary
Party	Candidate	Votes	%
Democratic	Lisa Escarcega (incumbent)	124,451	100.0
Total votes		124,451	100.0

=== Republican primary ===
==== Candidates ====
===== Nominee =====
- Frederick Espinoza

==== Results ====
Republican primary
Party	Candidate	Votes	%
Republican	Frederick Espinoza	14,899	100.0
Total votes		14,899	100.0

=== General election ===
==== Results ====
2026 Colorado's 1st State Board of Education district election
Party	Candidate	Votes	%
Democratic	Lisa Escarcega (incumbent)		
Republican	Frederick Espinoza		
Libertarian	Clayton Casciato		
Total votes			100.00

== District 3 ==
=== Republican primary ===
==== Candidates ====
===== Nominee =====
- Sherri Wright, incumbent board member

==== Results ====
Republican primary
Party	Candidate	Votes	%
Republican	Sherri Wright (incumbent)	77,716	100.0
Total votes		77,716	100.0

=== Democratic primary ===
At the 2026 assembly, David Baugh failed to achieve 30% of the assembly vote, so he did not qualify for the ballot.

==== Candidates ====
===== Nominee =====
- Barb Clementi, former at-large board member of Pueblo School District 60 (2015–2023)

===== Eliminated at convention =====
- David Baugh

==== Results ====
Democratic primary
Party	Candidate	Votes	%
Democratic	Barb Clementi	73,361	100.0
Total votes		73,361	100.0

=== General election ===
==== Results ====
2026 Colorado's 3rd State Board of Education district election
Party	Candidate	Votes	%
Republican	Sherri Wright (incumbent)		
Democratic	Barb Clementi		
Total votes			100.00

== District 7 ==
=== Democratic primary ===
==== Candidates ====
===== Nominee =====
- Karla Esser, incumbent board member

==== Results ====
Democratic primary
Party	Candidate	Votes	%
Democratic	Karla Esser (incumbent)	104,867	100.0
Total votes		104,867	100.0

=== Republican primary ===
==== Candidates ====
===== Nominee =====
- Steve Barton

==== Results ====
Republican primary
Party	Candidate	Votes	%
Republican	Steve Barton	49,678	100.0
Total votes		49,678	100.0

=== General election ===
==== Results ====
2026 Colorado's 7th State Board of Education district election
Party	Candidate	Votes	%
Democratic	Karla Esser (incumbent)		
Republican	Steve Barton		
Libertarian	Ross Klopf		
Total votes			100.00
