= 2026 El Paso County, Colorado, elections =

Local elections in Colorado, US

2026 El Paso County elections
- November 3, 2026

A general election was held in El Paso County, Colorado, on November 3, 2026, to elect various county-level positions. Primary elections were held on June 30.

== County Assessor ==
=== Republican primary ===
==== Candidates ====
===== Nominee =====
- Becky Fuller, accountant

===== Eliminated in primary =====
- Raymond Garcia, chair of the Colorado Hispanic Republicans

==== Results ====
Republican primary
| Party | Candidate | Votes | % |
|---|---|---|---|
| Republican | Becky Fuller | 57,813 | 74.50 |
| Republican | Raymond Garcia | 19,787 | 25.50 |
| Total votes | | 77,600 | 100.00 |

=== Democratic primary ===
==== Candidates ====
===== Nominee =====
- David Traenkle, retired teacher and mortgage appraiser

==== Results ====
Democratic primary
| Party | Candidate | Votes | % |
|---|---|---|---|
| Democratic | David Traenkle | 61,290 | 100.00 |
| Total votes | | 61,290 | 100.00 |

=== General election ===
==== Results ====
2026 El Paso County Assessor election
| Party | Candidate | Votes | % |
|---|---|---|---|
| Republican | Becky Fuller | 160,423 | 53.12 |
| Democratic | David Traenkle | 141,570 | 46.88 |
| Total votes | | 301,993 | 100.00 |

== County Clerk and Recorder ==
=== Republican primary ===
==== Candidates ====
===== Nominee =====
- Steve Schleiker, incumbent clerk and recorder

==== Results ====
Republican primary
| Party | Candidate | Votes | % |
|---|---|---|---|
| Republican | Steve Schleiker (incumbent) | 75,883 | 100.00 |
| Total votes | | 75,883 | 100.00 |

=== Democratic primary ===
==== Candidates ====
===== Nominee =====
- Tracie Woods

==== Results ====
Democratic primary
| Party | Candidate | Votes | % |
|---|---|---|---|
| Democratic | Tracie Woods | 62,970 | 100.00 |
| Total votes | | 62,970 | 100.00 |

=== General election ===
==== Results ====
2026 El Paso County Clerk and Recorder election
| Party | Candidate | Votes | % |
|---|---|---|---|
| Republican | Steve Schleiker (incumbent) | 170,864 | 56.03 |
| Democratic | Tracie Woods | 134,090 | 43.97 |
| Total votes | | 304,954 | 100.00 |

== County Coroner ==
=== Republican primary ===
==== Candidates ====
===== Nominee =====
- Emily Russell-Kinsley, incumbent coroner

==== Results ====
Republican primary
| Party | Candidate | Votes | % |
|---|---|---|---|
| Republican | Emily Russell-Kinsley (incumbent) | 74,193 | 100.00 |
| Total votes | | 74,193 | 100.00 |

=== General election ===
==== Results ====
2026 El Paso County Coroner election
| Party | Candidate | Votes | % |
|---|---|---|---|
| Republican | Emily Russell-Kinsley (incumbent) | 223,249 | 100.00 |
| Total votes | | 223,249 | 100.00 |

== County Sheriff ==
=== Republican primary ===
==== Candidates ====
===== Nominee =====
- Joe Roybal, incumbent sheriff

==== Results ====
Republican primary
| Party | Candidate | Votes | % |
|---|---|---|---|
| Republican | Joe Roybal (incumbent) | 75,492 | 100.00 |
| Total votes | | 75,492 | 100.00 |

=== Democratic primary ===
==== Candidates ====
===== Nominee =====
- Mateo Montoya-Collis, police officer

==== Results ====
Democratic primary
| Party | Candidate | Votes | % |
|---|---|---|---|
| Democratic | Mateo Montoya-Collis | 61,567 | 100.00 |
| Total votes | | 61,567 | 100.00 |

=== General election ===
==== Results ====
2026 El Paso County Sheriff election
| Party | Candidate | Votes | % |
|---|---|---|---|
| Republican | Joe Roybal (incumbent) | 166,620 | 54.68 |
| Democratic | Mateo Montoya-Collis | 138,074 | 45.32 |
| Total votes | | 304,694 | 100.00 |

== County Surveyor ==
No candidate filed to run in the primary election.

== County Treasurer ==
=== Republican primary ===
==== Candidates ====
===== Nominee =====
- Chuck Broerman, incumbent treasurer

==== Results ====
Republican primary
| Party | Candidate | Votes | % |
|---|---|---|---|
| Republican | Chuck Broerman (incumbent) | 75,136 | 100.00 |
| Total votes | | 75,136 | 100.00 |

=== General election ===
==== Results ====
2026 El Paso County Treasurer election
| Party | Candidate | Votes | % |
|---|---|---|---|
| Republican | Chuck Broerman (incumbent) | 213,422 | 100.00 |
| Total votes | | 213,422 | 100.00 |

== County Commission ==
=== District 1 ===
==== Republican primary ====
===== Candidates =====
====== Nominee ======
- Ryan Graham, real estate agent

====== Eliminated in primary ======
- Lindsay Moore, homeschool co-op founder

===== Endorsements =====
Ryan Graham

Newspapers

- The Gazette

===== Results =====
Republican primary
| Party | Candidate | Votes | % |
|---|---|---|---|
| Republican | Ryan Graham | 15,173 | 63.04 |
| Republican | Lindsay Moore | 8,896 | 36.96 |
| Total votes | | 24,069 | 100.00 |

==== Democratic primary ====
===== Candidates =====
====== Nominee ======
- Gavin Rainey

===== Results =====
Democratic primary
| Party | Candidate | Votes | % |
|---|---|---|---|
| Democratic | Gavin Rainey | 12,825 | 100.00 |
| Total votes | | 12,825 | 100.00 |

==== General election ====
===== Results =====
2026 El Paso County Commission District 1 election
| Party | Candidate | Votes | % |
|---|---|---|---|
| Republican | Ryan Graham | 43,592 | 58.88 |
| Democratic | Gavin Rainey | 28,995 | 39.16 |
| Independent | Matt Grubesic | 1,452 | 1.96 |
| Total votes | | 74,039 | 100.00 |

=== District 5 ===
==== Republican primary ====
===== Candidates =====
====== Nominee ======
- Lauren Nelson, incumbent commissioner

====== Eliminated in primary ======
- Vickie Tonkins, former county party chair

===== Endorsements =====
Lauren Nelson

Newspapers

- The Gazette

===== Results =====
Republican primary
| Party | Candidate | Votes | % |
|---|---|---|---|
| Republican | Lauren Nelson (incumbent) | 6,089 | 62.50 |
| Republican | Vickie Tonkins | 3,653 | 37.50 |
| Total votes | | 9,742 | 100.00 |

==== Democratic primary ====
===== Candidates =====
====== Nominee ======
- Yolanda Avila, former Colorado Springs city councilmember

====== Eliminated in primary ======
- Christian Seale, community organizer

===== Results =====
Democratic primary
| Party | Candidate | Votes | % |
|---|---|---|---|
| Democratic | Yolanda Avila | 8,583 | 69.99 |
| Democratic | Christian Seale | 3,681 | 30.01 |
| Total votes | | 12,264 | 100.00 |

==== General election ====
===== Results =====
2026 El Paso County Commission District 5 election
| Party | Candidate | Votes | % |
|---|---|---|---|
| Democratic | Yolanda Avila | 26,963 | 58.52 |
| Republican | Lauren Nelson (incumbent) | 19,114 | 41.48 |
| Total votes | | 46,077 | 100.00 |
