= Governor Shoup =

Governor Shoup may refer to:

- George L. Shoup (1836–1904), 1st Governor of Idaho
- Oliver Henry Shoup (1869–1940), 22nd Governor of Colorado
