= Governor Peabody =

Governor Peabody may refer to:

- Endicott Peabody (1920–1997), 62nd Governor of Massachusetts
- James Hamilton Peabody (1852–1917), 13th and 15th Governor of Colorado
