= Alva Adams =

Alva Adams may refer to:

- Alva Adams (governor) (1850–1922), Governor of the US state of Colorado
- Alva B. Adams (1875–1941), US Senator from Colorado
