= Adamsville, Wisconsin =

- Ghost town
- Location within Wisconsin Location within the United States
- Coordinates: 42°54′26″N 89°54′45″W
- Country: United States
- State: Wisconsin
- County: Iowa
- Town: Ridgeway
- Elevation: 889 ft (271 m)
- GNIS feature ID: 2760537

Adamsville is a ghost town in the town of Ridgeway, Iowa County, Wisconsin, United States. Adamsville was founded by the politician John Adams and was the birthplace of his son Alva Adams, who served as the governor of Colorado.
