= Frederick Walker Pitkin =

American politician (1837 – 1886)

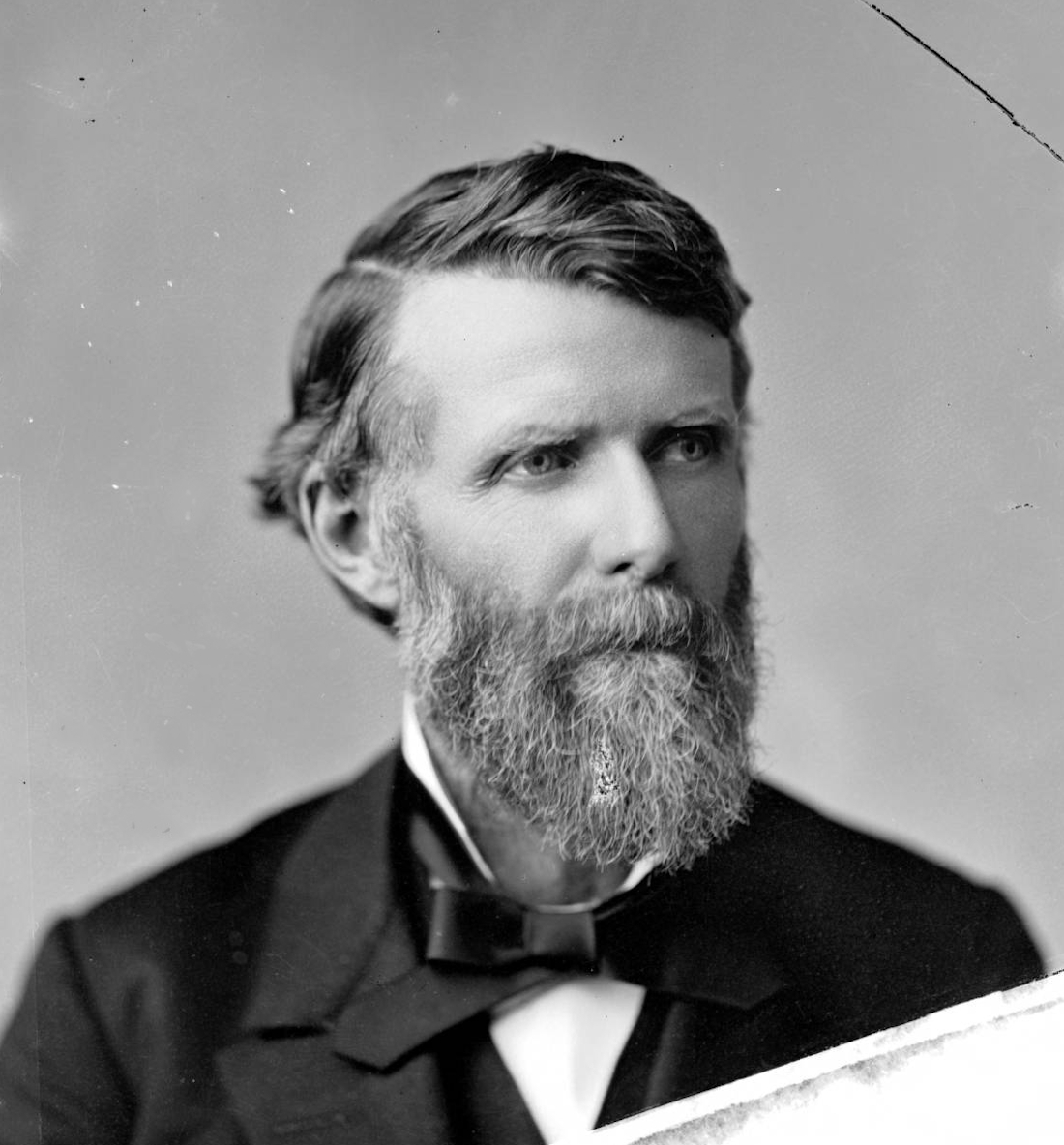
- Pitkin, circa 1886-1901

2nd Governor of Colorado
- In office January 14, 1879 – January 9, 1883
- Lieutenant: Horace A.W. Tabor
- Preceded by: John L. Routt
- Succeeded by: James B. Grant

Personal details
- Born: August 31, 1837 Manchester, Connecticut, US
- Died: December 18, 1886 (aged 49) Pueblo, Colorado, US
- Resting place: Fairmount Cemetery (Denver)
- Party: Republican
- Spouse: Fidelia Maria James (m.1862)
- Children: 3

Frederick Walker Pitkin (August 31, 1837 – December 18, 1886) was an American politician who served as the second governor of the state of Colorado from 1879 to 1883. He was a member of the Republican Party.

== Life and career ==
Frederick Pitkin was born in Manchester, Connecticut. He graduated cum laude from Wesleyan University in 1858, and earned a law degree from Albany Law School in 1859. Following graduation, he moved to Milwaukee, Wisconsin to establish the law firm of Palmer, Hooker, and Pitkin. In 1872, he resigned from the firm due to illness, and set sail for Europe in search of a cure.

Returning to the United States in 1874, he settled in southwestern Colorado, where his health stabilized, and resumed his career as an attorney. In addition, he invested in the mining industry, founding the Michael "Micky" Breen fluorine mine on Engineer Pass with Milton Cline.

Utilizing his contacts in the mining industry, he announced his candidacy for Governor of Colorado in 1878, and won. During his two terms as governor, he dealt with a number of crises including the railway feud involving the Atchison, Topeka-Santa Fe, and the Denver-Rio Grande rail companies. He ordered the suppression of the Ute Indian uprising at the Milk Creek Battle or Meeker Massacre in 1879. In 1880, he declared martial law during the mining strike at Leadville. He was an unsuccessful candidate for U.S. Senate in 1882.

Following his retirement from public office, he settled in Pueblo, Colorado and resumed his law practice and mining business. He died in Pueblo and was buried in Riverside Cemetery in Denver, Colorado. Later, his remains were moved to Fairmount Cemetery in Denver.

He and his wife Fidelia James, a native of Lockport, New York, had three children: Robert James Pitkin, Florence Pitkin, and George Orrin Pitkin.

== Entities named after Pitkin ==
- Pitkin County, Colorado
- Pitkin, Colorado
- Pitkin Avenue, Saguache, Colorado
- Pitkin Street, Fort Collins, Colorado
- Pitkin Avenue, Glenwood Springs, Colorado
- Pitkin Avenue, Grand Junction, Colorado
- Pitkin Avenue, Pueblo, Colorado

Party political offices
Preceded by John Long Routt	Republican nominee for Governor of Colorado; 1878, 1880	Succeeded by E. L. Campbell
Political offices
Preceded by John Long Routt	Governor of Colorado; 1879–1883	Succeeded by James Benton Grant
