= 1898 Colorado gubernatorial election =

- November 8, 1898
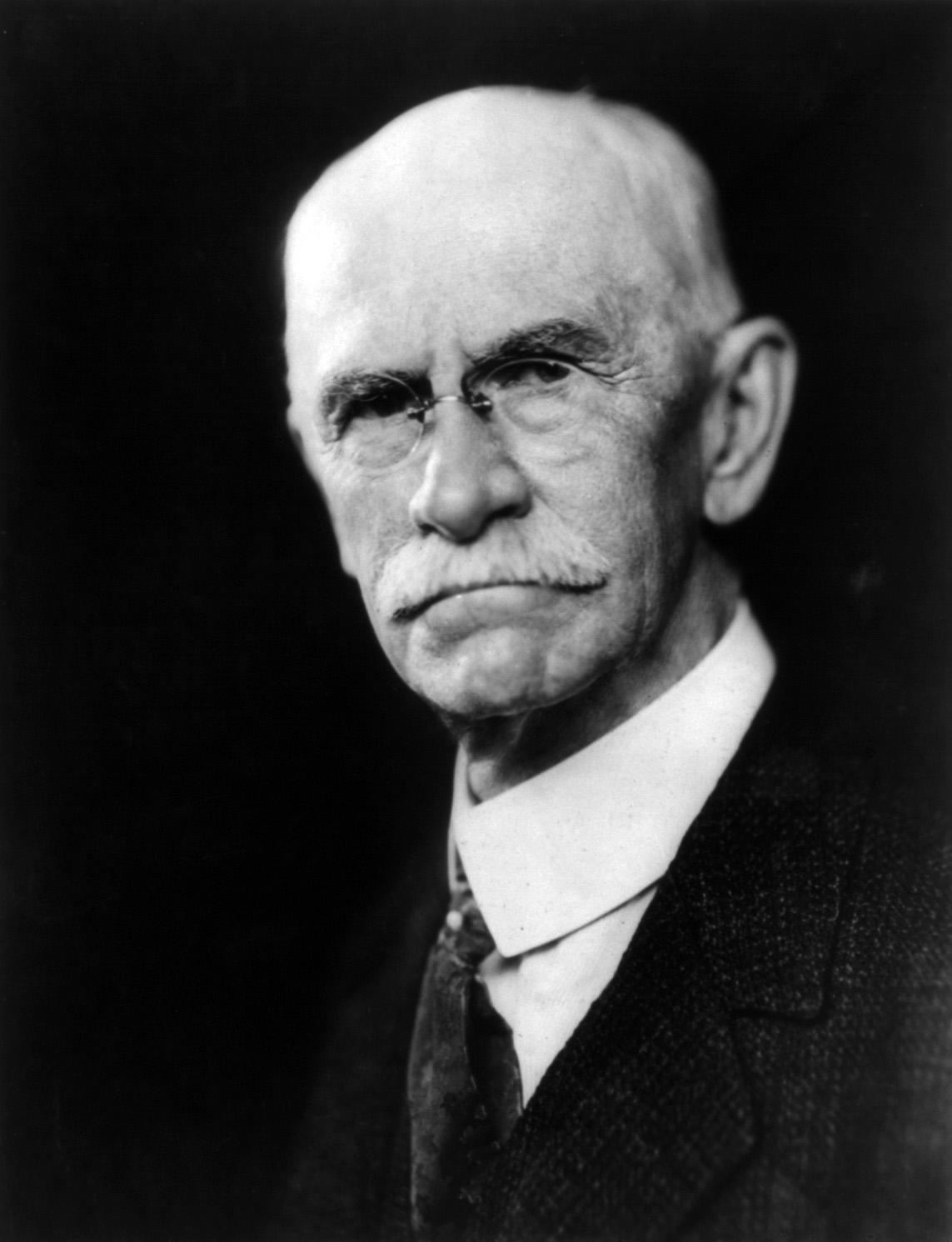

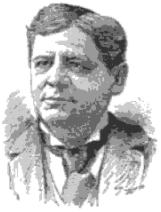
Nominee	Charles S. Thomas	Henry R. Wolcott
Party	Democratic	Republican
Popular vote	93,966	51,051
Percentage	62.89%	34.17%
- County results Thomas: 50–60% 60–70% 70–80% 80–90% 90–100% Wolcott: 40–50% 50–60% 60–70% 70–80%
Governor before election
Alva Adams
Democratic
Elected Governor
Charles S. Thomas
Democratic

The 1898 Colorado gubernatorial election was held on November 8, 1898. Democratic nominee Charles S. Thomas defeated Republican nominee Henry R. Wolcott with 62.89% of the vote.

== General election ==
=== Candidates ===
Major party candidates

- Charles S. Thomas, Democratic
- Henry R. Wolcott, Republican

Other candidates

- Robert H. Rhodes, Prohibition
- Nixon Elliott, Socialist Labor

=== Results ===
1898 Colorado gubernatorial election
Party	Candidate	Votes	%	±%
Democratic	Charles S. Thomas	93,966	62.89%	+16.67%
Republican	Henry R. Wolcott	51,051	34.17%	+21.51%
Prohibition	Robert H. Rhodes	2,711	1.81%	
Socialist Labor	Nixon Elliott	1,696	1.14%	N/A
Majority		42,915	28.72%	
Turnout		149,424		
Democratic hold		Swing		

County	Thomas %	Thomas #	Wolcott %	Wolcott #	Rhodes %	Rhodes #	Elliott %	Elliott #	Total
Arapahoe	62.54%	33,858	34.18%	13,038	1.84%	704	1.42%	544	38,144
Archuleta	43.98%	223	54.43%	276	1.38%	7	0.19%	1	507
Baca	41.47%	90	58.52%	127	0.00%	0	0.00%	0	217
Bent	53.01%	387	44.52%	325	2.19%	16	0.27%	2	730
Boulder	66.11%	4,069	30.32%	1,866	2.71%	167	0.84%	52	6,154
Chaffee	75.35%	1,614	22.12%	474	1.91%	41	0.60%	13	2,142
Cheyenne	44.38%	79	55.61%	99	0.00%	0	0.00%	0	178
Clear Creek	82.67%	1,851	15.23%	341	1.33%	30	0.75%	17	2,239
Conejos	31.68%	653	67.44%	1,390	0.38%	8	0.48%	10	2,061
Costilla	29.10%	468	70.08%	1,127	0.68%	11	0.12%	2	1,608
Custer	72.77%	711	25.58%	250	1.02%	10	0.61%	6	977
Delta	68.53%	952	24.83%	345	3.74%	52	2.87%	40	1,389
Dolores	88.79%	436	7.94%	39	1.42%	7	1.83%	9	491
Douglas	62.01%	684	36.80%	406	0.99%	11	0.18%	2	1,103
Eagle	76.63%	705	21.52%	198	0.54%	5	1.30%	12	920
El Paso	63.64%	10,596	34.50%	5,745	1.25%	209	0.59%	99	16,649
Elbert	59.46%	537	37.98%	343	2.10%	19	0.44%	4	903
Fremont	55.07%	2,413	37.75%	1,654	2.64%	116	4.51%	198	4,381
Garfield	75.32%	1,447	21.44%	412	2.13%	41	1.09%	21	1,921
Gilpin	61.81%	1,766	33.32%	952	2.41%	69	2.45%	70	2,857
Grand	79.51%	163	19.51%	40	0.97%	2	0.00%	0	205
Gunnison	64.90%	1,287	31.82%	631	2.21%	44	1.05%	21	1,983
Hinsdale	82.14%	483	16.15%	95	1.02%	6	0.68%	4	588
Huerfano	29.13%	800	70.28%	1,930	0.36%	10	0.21%	6	2,746
Jefferson	61.66%	2,130	36.24%	1,252	1.47%	51	0.60%	21	3,454
Kiowa	58.46%	145	40.32%	100	1.20%	3	0.00%	0	248
Kit Carson	37.68%	176	56.31%	263	5.78%	27	0.21%	1	467
La Plata	78.54%	1,567	19.74%	394	1.35%	27	0.35%	7	1,995
Lake	65.94%	3,763	32.19%	1,837	1.06%	61	0.78%	45	5,706
Larimer	56.85%	1,917	39.65%	1,337	3.35%	113	0.14%	5	3,372
Las Animas	66.36%	3,759	32.83%	1,860	0.58%	33	0.21%	12	5,664
Lincoln	47.63%	121	50.00%	127	2.36%	6	0.00%	0	254
Logan	50.42%	412	45.53%	372	3.79%	31	0.24%	2	817
Mesa	61.07%	1,423	30.68%	715	6.69%	156	1.54%	36	2,330
Mineral	81.51%	635	16.68%	130	0.64%	5	1.15%	9	779
Montezuma	82.01%	497	13.86%	84	2.47%	15	1.65%	10	606
Montrose	61.35%	759	26.27%	325	4.76%	59	7.59%	94	1,237
Morgan	51.56%	460	45.29%	404	2.69%	24	0.44%	4	892
Otero	60.32%	1,326	34.57%	760	4.68%	103	0.40%	9	2,198
Ouray	90.38%	1,939	6.29%	135	0.69%	15	2.51%	54	2,143
Park	71.05%	933	27.41%	360	0.60%	8	0.91%	12	1,313
Phillips	47.24%	180	49.34%	188	3.41%	13	0.00%	0	381
Pitkin	75.84%	1,567	22.02%	455	1.01%	21	1.11%	23	2,066
Prowers	45.28%	423	51.71%	483	2.78%	26	0.21%	2	934
Pueblo	53.33%	4,275	43.00%	3,447	1.99%	160	1.67%	134	8,016
Rio Blanco	75.79%	335	20.81%	92	2.48%	11	0.90%	4	442
Rio Grande	69.98%	1,040	26.58%	395	3.02%	45	0.40%	6	1,486
Routt	81.64%	1,005	16.97%	209	0.73%	9	0.64%	8	1,231
Saguache	59.84%	857	38.40%	550	0.62%	9	1.11%	16	1,432
San Juan	81.74%	1,012	17.04%	211	0.48%	6	0.72%	9	1,238
San Miguel	69.21%	1,232	29.04%	517	0.95%	17	0.78%	14	1,780
Sedgwick	34.90%	74	60.84%	129	3.30%	7	0.94%	2	212
Summit	83.81%	730	14.58%	127	1.49%	13	0.11%	1	871
Washington	40.25%	159	55.18%	218	4.05%	16	0.50%	2	395
Weld	63.77%	2,595	32.41%	1,319	3.34%	136	0.46%	19	4,069
Yuma	61.53%	248	37.96%	153	0.00%	0	0.49%	2	403

Counties that flipped from Populist to Democratic

- Arapahoe
- Chaffee
- Clear Creek
- Delta
- Dolores
- El Paso
- Eagle
- Fremont
- Garfield
- Lake
- Logan
- Morgan
- Mesa
- Mineral
- Ouray
- Park
- Pitkin
- Rio Grande
- Saguache
- San Juan

Counties that flipped from Democratic to Republican

- Archuleta
- Huerfano
- Lincoln
- Cheyenne
- Conejos
- Costilla
- Phillips
- Prowers
- Sedgwick
