= 2014 Colorado Attorney General election =

- November 4, 2014
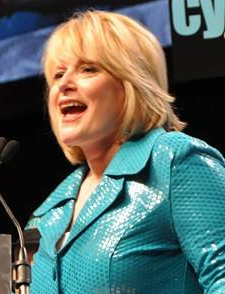

Nominee	Cynthia Coffman	Don Quick	David Williams
Party	Republican	Democratic	Libertarian
Popular vote	1,002,626	826,182	120,745
Percentage	51.4%	42.4%	6.2%
- Coffman: 40–50% 50–60% 60–70% 70–80% 80–90% Quick: 40–50% 50–60% 60–70%
Attorney General before election
John Suthers
Republican
Elected Attorney General
Cynthia Coffman
Republican

The 2014 Colorado Attorney General election took place on November 4, 2014, to elect the Attorney General of Colorado. Incumbent Republican Attorney General John Suthers was term-limited form seeking a third consecutive term. Republican nominee Chief Deputy Attorney General Cynthia Coffman defeated Democratic nominee former deputy attorney general Don Quick with 51.4% of the vote. As of 2026, this is the last time a Republican was elected Attorney General of Colorado.

== Republican primary ==
=== Candidates ===
==== Nominee ====
- Cynthia Coffman, Chief Deputy Attorney General and wife of U.S. Representative Mike Coffman

==== Withdrew ====
- Mark Waller, former Minority Leader of the Colorado House of Representatives

==== Declined ====
- Ken Buck, Weld County District Attorney and Republican nominee for the U.S. Senate in 2010 (ran for senate, then for U.S. House)
- Mario Nicolais, attorney (ran for state senate)

=== Results ===
Republican primary results
Party	Candidate	Votes	%
Republican	Cynthia Coffman	321,062	100.00%
Total votes		321,062	100.00%

== Democratic primary ==
=== Candidates ===
==== Nominee ====
- Don Quick, former deputy attorney general and former District Attorney from the Seventeenth Judicial District

==== Declined ====
- Morgan Carroll, President of the Colorado Senate
- Stan Garnett, district attorney and Democratic nominee for attorney general in 2010
- Mitch Morrissey, district attorney

=== Results ===
Democratic primary results
Party	Candidate	Votes	%
Democratic	Don Quick	196,645	100.00%
Total votes		196,645	100.00%

== General election ==
=== Polling ===
Poll source	Date(s) administered	Sample size	Margin of error	Cynthia Coffman (R)	Don Quick (D)	David Williams (L)	Undecided
Public Policy Polling	November 1–2, 2014	739	± 3.6%	50%	37%	5%	9%
SurveyUSA	October 27–29, 2014	618	± 4%	45%	38%	6%	11%
Suffolk University	October 18–21, 2014	500	± 4.4%	42%	31%	8%	19%
Public Policy Polling	October 16–19, 2014	778	± 3.5%	46%	32%	7%	15%
Gravis Marketing	October 16, 2014	695	± 4%	44%	32%	11%	13%
Suffolk University	September 9–16, 2014	500	± 4.4%	40%	30%	5%	25%
Public Policy Polling	July 17–20, 2014	653	± 3.8%	38%	29%	—	32%
Gravis Marketing	July 8–10, 2014	1,106	± 3%	42%	38%	9%	11%

=== Results ===
2014 Colorado Attorney General election
Party	Candidate	Votes	%
Republican	Cynthia Coffman	1,002,626	51.43%
Democratic	Don Quick	826,182	42.38%
Libertarian	David Williams	120,745	6.19%
Total votes		1,949,553	100.00%
Republican hold			

==== By congressional district ====
Coffman won five of seven congressional districts, including one that elected a Democrat.

District	Coffman	Quick	Williams	Representative
1st	33%	61%	6%	Diana DeGette
2nd	44%	50%	6%	Jared Polis
3rd	56%	38%	6%	Scott Tipton
4th	65%	29%	6%	Cory Gardner (113th Congress)
4th	65%	29%	6%	Ken Buck (114th Congress)
5th	65%	29%	6%	Doug Lamborn
6th	52%	42%	6%	Mike Coffman
7th	47%	45%	7%	Ed Perlmutter

== See also ==
- Colorado Attorney General
