= 1904 Colorado gubernatorial election =

- November 8, 1904
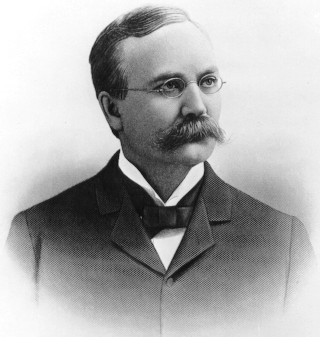

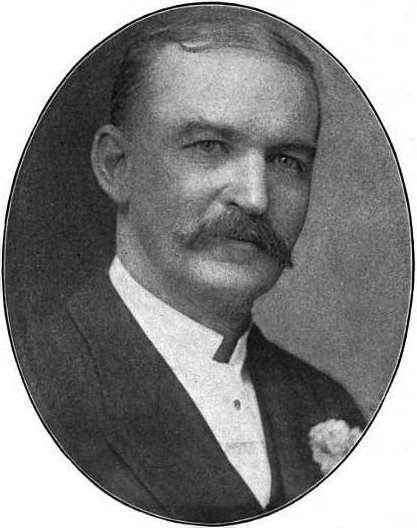
Nominee	Alva Adams	James Hamilton Peabody
Party	Democratic	Republican
Popular vote	123,092	113,754
Percentage	50.64%	46.80%
- County results Adams: 40–50% 50–60% 60–70% 70–80% Peabody: 40–50% 50–60% 60–70%
Governor before election
James Hamilton Peabody
Republican
Elected Governor
Alva Adams
Democratic

The 1904 Colorado gubernatorial election was held on November 8, 1904.

According to the tabulated results, Democratic nominee Alva Adams defeated incumbent Republican James Hamilton Peabody with 50.64% of the vote. Peabody successfully contested the results based on allegations of Democratic voter fraud in Denver and was installed as Governor on March 17, 1905, after Alva Adams had served for over two months. Peabody, who also faced election fraud allegations against himself, resigned the same day. Republican Lieutenant Governor Jesse Fuller McDonald then ascended to the governorship. This episode caused Colorado to have three different Governors within a time span of 24 hours.

== General election ==
=== Candidates ===
Major party candidates

- Alva Adams, Democratic
- James Hamilton Peabody, Republican

Other candidates

- Robert A. N. Wilson, Prohibition
- Andrew H. Floaten, Socialist
- James Merwin, People's
- J. A. Knight, Socialist Labor

=== Results ===
1904 Colorado gubernatorial election
Party	Candidate	Votes	%	±%
Democratic	Alva Adams	123,092	50.64%	+7.43%
Republican	James Hamilton Peabody (incumbent)	113,754	46.80%	−0.14%
Prohibition	Robert A. N. Wilson	3,023	1.24%	−0.85%
Socialist	Andrew H. Floaten	2,593	1.07%	−2.77%
Populist	James Merwin	325	0.13%	−3.30%
Socialist Labor	J. A. Knight	279	0.12%	−0.37%
Majority		9,338	3.84%	
Turnout		243,066		
Democratic gain from Republican		Swing		
