= 1910 Colorado gubernatorial election =

- November 8, 1910
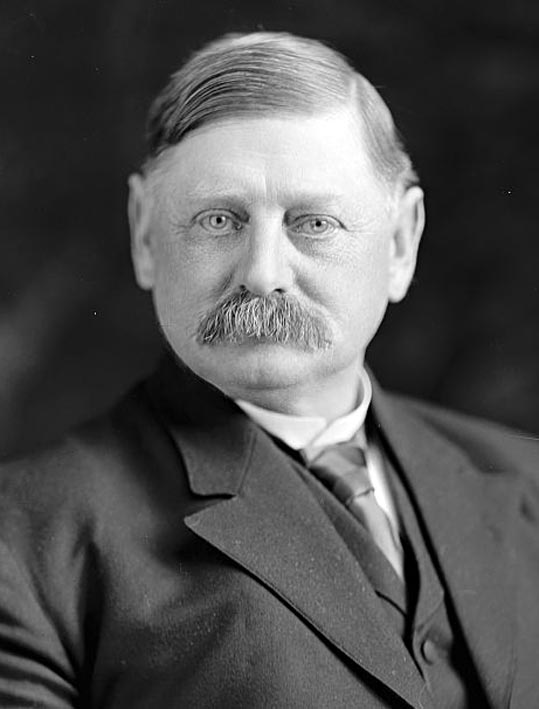

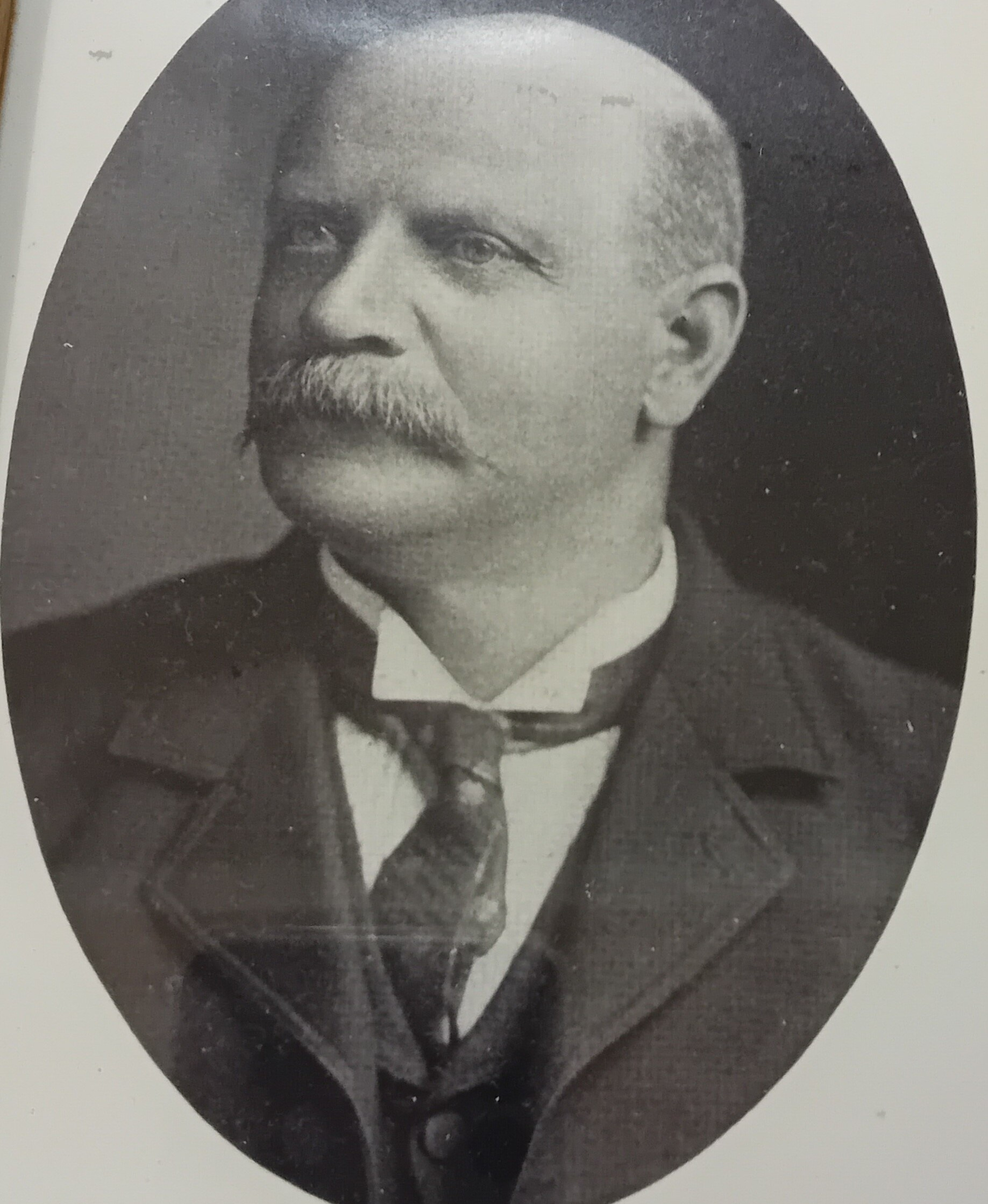
Nominee	John F. Shafroth	John B. Stephen
Party	Democratic	Republican
Popular vote	114,676	97,691
Percentage	51.04%	43.48%
- County results Shafroth: 40–50% 50–60% 60–70% Stephen: 40–50% 50–60% 70–80%
Governor before election
John F. Shafroth
Democratic
Elected Governor
John F. Shafroth
Democratic

The 1910 Colorado gubernatorial election was held on November 8, 1910. Incumbent Democrat John F. Shafroth defeated Republican nominee John B. Stephen with 51.04% of the vote.

== General election ==
=== Candidates ===
Major party candidates

- John F. Shafroth, Democratic
- John B. Stephen, Republican

Other candidates

- Henry W. Pinkham, Socialist
- Phidelah A. Rice, Prohibition
- George Anderson, Socialist Labor

=== Results ===
1910 Colorado gubernatorial election
Party	Candidate	Votes	%	±%
Democratic	John F. Shafroth (incumbent)	114,676	51.04%	+1.63%
Republican	John B. Stephen	97,691	43.48%	−1.68%
Socialist	Henry W. Pinkham	7,844	3.49%	+0.46%
Prohibition	Phidelah A. Rice	3,751	1.67%	−0.73%
Socialist Labor	George Anderson	735	0.33%	
Majority		16,985	7.56%	+3.31%
Turnout		224,697		
Democratic hold		Swing		
