= 1902 Colorado gubernatorial election =

- November 4, 1902
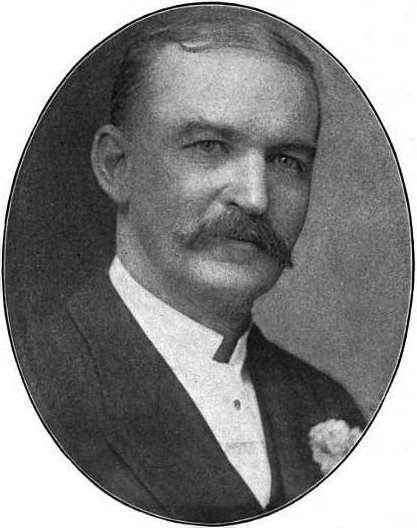

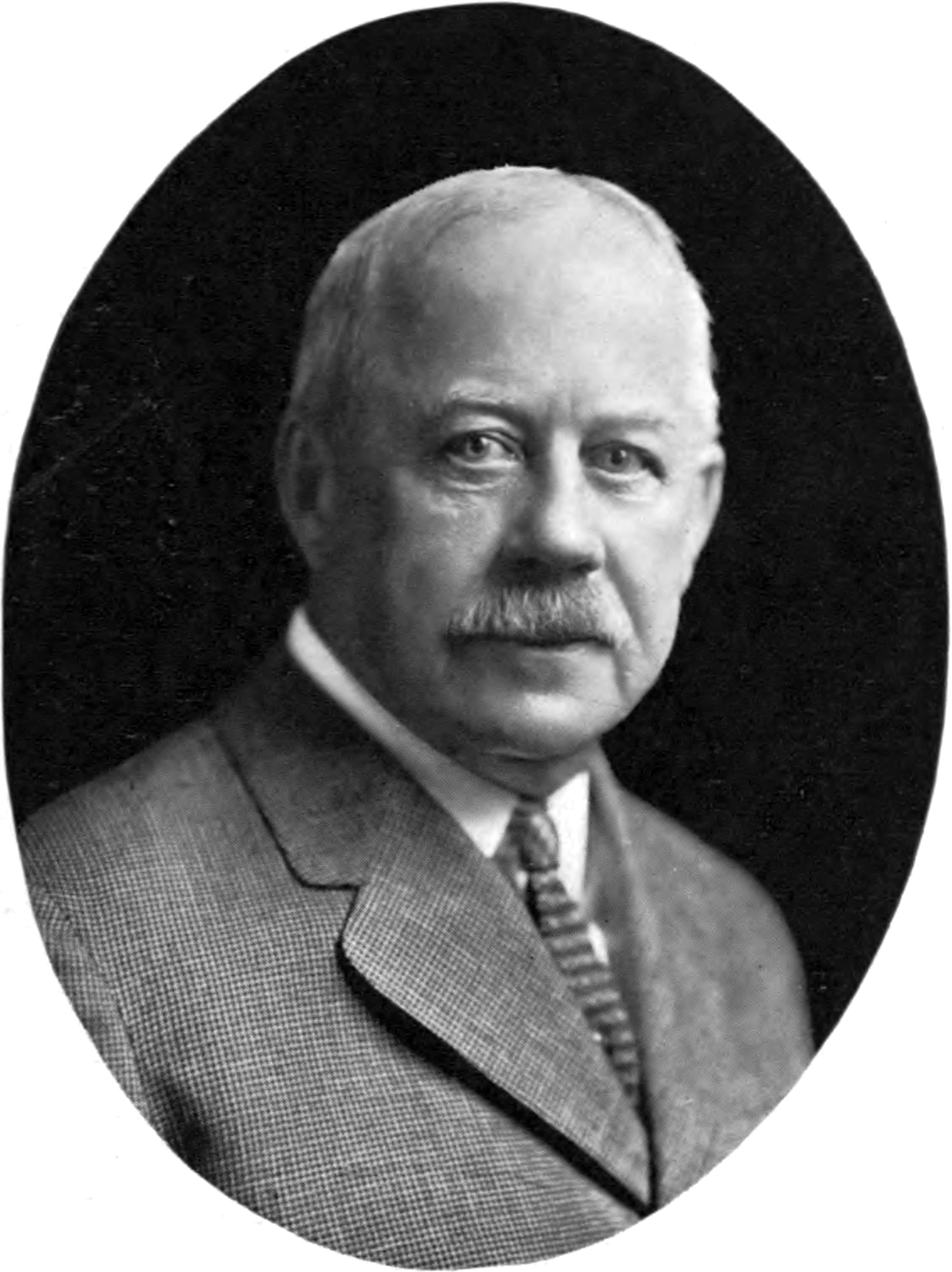
Nominee	James Hamilton Peabody	E. C. Stimson
Party	Republican	Democratic
Popular vote	87,684	80,727
Percentage	46.94%	43.21%
- County results Peabody: 30–40% 40–50% 50–60% 60–70% 80–90% Stimson: 30–40% 40–50% 50–60% 60–70% Owens: 40–50%
Governor before election
James Bradley Orman
Democratic
Elected Governor
James Hamilton Peabody
Republican

The 1902 Colorado gubernatorial election was held on November 4, 1902. Republican nominee James Hamilton Peabody defeated Democratic nominee E. C. Stimson with 46.92% of the vote.

== General election ==
=== Candidates ===
Major party candidates

- James Hamilton Peabody, Republican
- E. C. Stimson, Democratic

Other candidates

- J. C. Provost, Socialist
- Frank W. Owens, People's
- Otto A. Reinhardt, Prohibition
- J. A. Knight, Socialist Labor

=== Results ===
1902 Colorado gubernatorial election
Party	Candidate	Votes	%	±%
Republican	James Hamilton Peabody	87,684	46.94%	+3.41%
Democratic	E. C. Stimson	80,727	43.21%	−10.57%
Socialist	J. C. Provost	7,177	3.84	N/A
Populist	Frank W. Owens	6,403	3.43	+3.24%
Prohibition	Otto A. Reinhardt	3,910	2.09	+0.41%
Socialist Labor	J. A. Knight	909	0.49	+0.04%
Majority		6,957	3.73%	
Turnout		186,820	100.00	
Republican gain from Democratic		Swing		
