= 1884 Colorado gubernatorial election =

- November 4, 1884

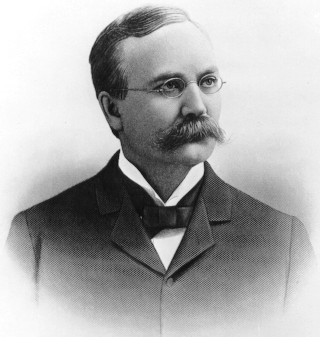
Nominee	Benjamin Harrison Eaton	Alva Adams
Party	Republican	Democratic
Popular vote	33,845	30,743
Percentage	50.74%	46.09%
- County results Eaton: 40–50% 50–60% 60–70% Adams: 40–50% 50–60% 60–70%
Governor before election
James Benton Grant
Democratic
Elected Governor
Benjamin Harrison Eaton
Republican

The 1884 Colorado gubernatorial election was held on November 4, 1884. Republican nominee Benjamin Harrison Eaton defeated Democratic nominee Alva Adams with 50.74% of the vote.

== General election ==
=== Candidates ===
Major party candidates

- Benjamin Harrison Eaton, Republican
- Alva Adams, Democratic

Other candidates

- John E. Washburn, Greenback

=== Results ===
1884 Colorado gubernatorial election
Party	Candidate	Votes	%	±%
Republican	Benjamin Harrison Eaton	33,845	50.74%	+3.83%
Democratic	Alva Adams	30,743	46.09%	−4.98%
Greenback	John E. Washburn	2,104	3.15%	+1.16%
Majority		3,102	4.65%	
Turnout		66,692		
Republican gain from Democratic		Swing		

==== By county ====
County	Eaton %	Eaton #	Adams %	Adams #	Washburn %	Washburn #	Total
Arapahoe	49.12%	6,488	45.99%	6,074	4.87%	644	13,206
Bent	42.26%	366	54.38%	471	3.34%	29	866
Boulder	51.62%	1,446	35.91%	1,006	12.45%	349	2,801
Chaffee	52.30%	1,121	47.41%	1,016	0.27%	6	2,143
Clear Creek	57.83%	1,380	40.86%	975	1.29%	31	2,386
Conejos	32.62%	429	67.30%	885	0.07%	1	1,315
Costilla	49.23%	483	50.77%	498	0.00%	0	981
Custer	56.76%	789	42.87%	596	0.35%	5	1,390
Delta	50.97%	210	47.81%	197	1.21%	5	412
Dolores	53.17%	184	46.82%	162	0.00%	0	346
Douglas	52.31%	282	46.93%	253	0.74%	4	539
Eagle	57.77%	286	41.81%	207	0.40%	4	495
El Paso	65.93%	1,231	30.95%	578	3.10%	58	1,867
Elbert	51.18%	216	48.57%	205	0.23%	1	422
Fremont	48.91%	812	44.33%	736	6.74%	112	1,660
Garfield	62.01%	240	37.98%	147	0.00%	0	387
Gilpin	60.00%	1,101	35.74%	656	4.25%	78	1,835
Grand	58.10%	251	40.74%	176	1.15%	5	432
Gunnison	48.80%	1,121	49.93%	1,147	1.26%	29	2,297
Hinsdale	55.65%	241	43.64%	189	0.69%	3	433
Huerfano	35.70%	407	62.10%	708	2.19%	25	1,140
Jefferson	50.56%	843	45.53%	759	3.89%	65	1,667
La Plata	44.18%	627	52.57%	746	3.24%	46	1,419
Lake	50.98%	3,135	47.51%	2,922	1.49%	92	6,149
Larimer	52.18%	1,005	40.29%	776	7.52%	145	1,926
Las Animas	44.27%	1,113	55.73%	1,401	0.00%	0	2,514
Mesa	50.21%	347	49.79%	344	0.00%	0	691
Montrose	55.30%	370	43.94%	294	0.74%	5	669
Ouray	49.94%	451	50.06%	452	0.00%	0	903
Park	53.25%	761	45.20%	646	1.53%	22	1,429
Pitkin	54.41%	591	45.58%	495	0.00%	0	1,086
Pueblo	46.64%	1,549	52.15%	1,732	1.20%	40	3,321
Rio Grande	53.28%	405	45.26%	344	1.44%	11	760
Routt	56.66%	102	43.33%	78	0.00%	0	180
Saguache	48.70%	490	51.29%	516	0.00%	0	1,006
San Juan	50.08%	585	48.88%	571	1.02%	12	1,168
San Miguel	61.70%	427	38.15%	571	0.14%	1	692
Summit	51.18%	605	48.30%	571	0.50%	6	1,182
Weld	54.94%	1,355	34.14%	842	10.90%	269	2,466

Counties that flipped from Democratic to Republican

- Arapahoe
- Chaffee
- Clear Creek
- Dolores
- Elbert
- Douglas
- Hinsdale
- Jefferson
- Lake
- Park
- San Juan
- Summit

Counties that flipped from Republican to Democratic

- Conejos
- Costilla
- Huerfano
- Saguache
