= 1880 Colorado gubernatorial election =

- November 2, 1880
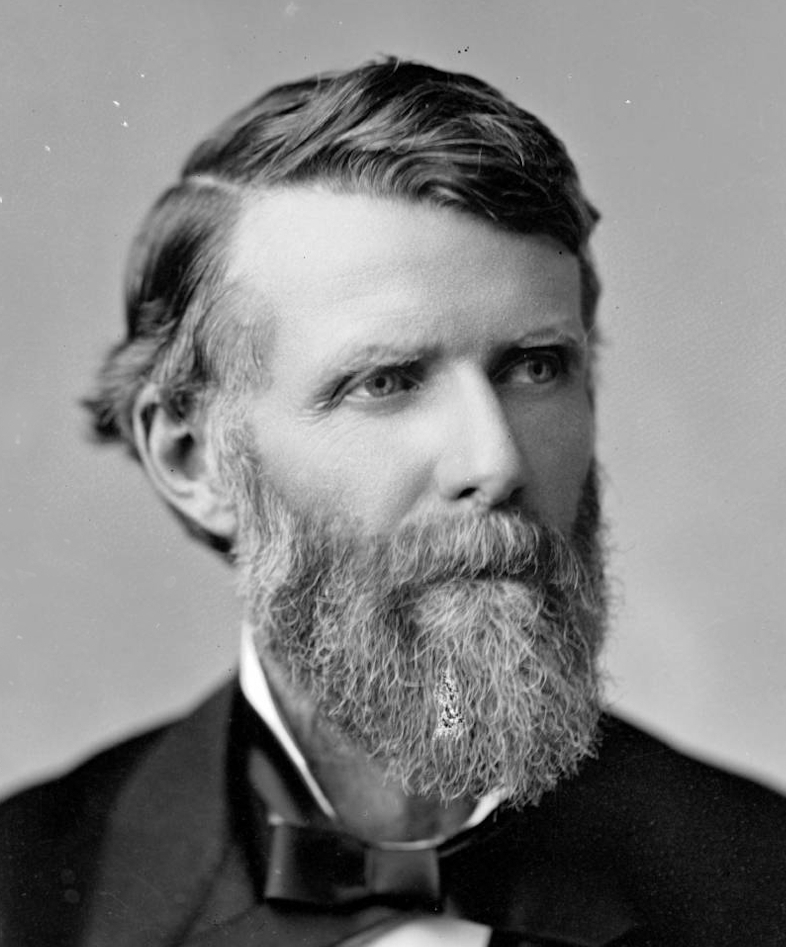

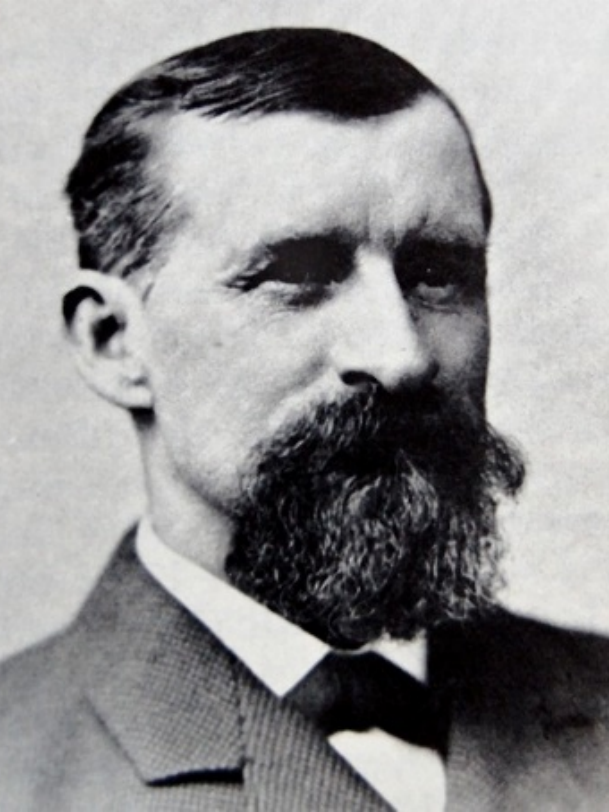
Nominee	Frederick Walker Pitkin	John S. Hough
Party	Republican	Democratic
Popular vote	28,465	23,547
Percentage	53.28%	44.08%
- County results Pitkin: 50–60% 60–70% 70–80% Hough: 40–50% 50–60% 60–70%
Governor before election
Frederick Walker Pitkin
Republican
Elected Governor
Frederick Walker Pitkin
Republican

The 1880 Colorado gubernatorial election was held on November 2, 1880. Incumbent Republican Frederick Walker Pitkin defeated Democratic nominee John S. Hough with 53.28% of the vote.

== General election ==
=== Candidates ===
Major party candidates

- Frederick Walker Pitkin, Republican
- John S. Hough, Democratic

Other candidates

- A. J. Chittenden, Greenback

=== Results ===
1880 Colorado gubernatorial election
Party	Candidate	Votes	%	±%
Republican	Frederick Walker Pitkin (incumbent)	28,465	53.28%	+3.30%
Democratic	John S. Hough	23,547	44.08%	+3.78%
Greenback	A. J. Chittenden	1,408	2.64%	−7.08%
Majority		4,918	9.20%	−0.68%
Turnout		53,420		
Republican hold		Swing		

==== By county ====
County	Pitkin %	Pitkin #	Hough %	Hough #	Chittenden %	Chittenden #	Total
Arapahoe	55.18%	4,354	43.57%	3,438	1.24%	98	7,890
Bent	45.23%	190	53.33%	224	1.42%	6	420
Boulder	56.56%	1,365	31.49%	760	11.93%	288	2,413
Chaffee	55.19%	1,290	44.15%	1,032	0.64%	15	2,337
Clear Creek	60.78%	1,581	35.94%	935	3.26%	85	2,601
Conejos	52.29%	639	47.54%	581	0.16%	2	1,222
Costilla	47.28%	340	52.71%	379	0.00%	0	719
Custer	55.48%	1,321	43.09%	1,026	1.42%	34	2,381
Douglas	54.88%	337	44.95%	276	0.16%	1	614
El Paso	67.06%	1,177	31.39%	551	1.53%	27	1,755
Elbert	48.14%	182	50.26%	190	1.58%	6	378
Fremont	50.91%	610	43.40%	520	5.67%	68	1,198
Gilpin	59.76%	1,233	39.02%	805	1.21%	25	2,063
Grand	71.56%	151	28.43%	60	0.00%	0	211
Gunnison	52.19%	1,084	47.52%	987	0.28%	6	2,077
Hinsdale	49.74%	390	50.25%	394	0.00%	0	784
Huerfano	46.50%	472	52.11%	529	1.37%	14	1,015
Jefferson	51.30%	864	45.30%	763	3.38%	57	1,684
La Plata	44.85%	270	55.14%	332	0.00%	0	602
Lake	49.13%	3,984	49.17%	3,987	1.68%	137	8,108
Larimer	55.65%	674	29.97%	363	14.36%	174	1,211
Las Animas	28.77%	539	68.87%	1,290	2.34%	44	1,873
Ouray	57.51%	524	41.82%	381	0.65%	6	911
Park	54.29%	720	43.51%	577	2.18%	29	1,326
Pueblo	50.29%	848	49.70%	838	0.00%	0	1,686
Rio Grande	65.52%	325	34.47%	171	0.00%	0	496
Routt	63.26%	31	36.73%	18	0.00%	0	49
Saguache	62.68%	556	36.86%	327	0.45%	4	887
San Juan	58.23%	251	40.60%	175	1.16%	5	431
Summit	50.28%	1,331	48.77%	1,291	0.94%	25	2,647
Weld	58.22%	832	24.28%	347	17.49%	250	1,429

Counties that flipped from Democratic to Republican

- Conejos
- Grand
- Jefferson
- Pueblo
- Routt

Counties that flipped from Republican to Democratic

- Costilla
- Hinsdale
- La Plata
- Lake
