= 1932 Colorado gubernatorial election =

- November 8, 1932
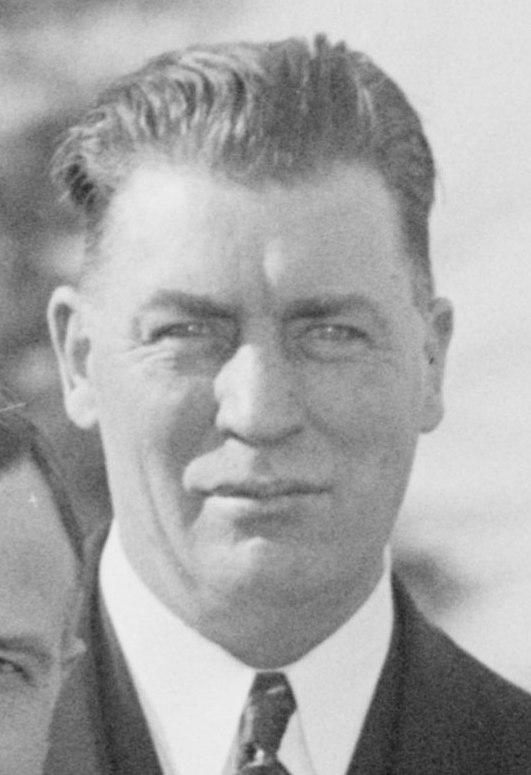

Nominee	Edwin C. Johnson	James D. Parriott
Party	Democratic	Republican
Popular vote	257,188	183,258
Percentage	57.23%	40.78%
- County results Johnson: 50–60% 60–70% 70–80% 80–90% Parriott: 40–50% 50–60%
Governor before election
Billy Adams
Democratic
Elected Governor
Edwin C. Johnson
Democratic

The 1932 Colorado gubernatorial election was held on November 8, 1932. Democratic nominee Edwin C. Johnson defeated Republican nominee James D. Parriott with 57.23% of the vote.

== Primary elections ==
Primary elections were held on September 13, 1932.

=== Democratic primary ===
==== Candidates ====
- Edwin C. Johnson, incumbent Lieutenant Governor
- E. V. Holland, Judge of the Colorado District Court

==== Results ====
Democratic primary results
Party	Candidate	Votes	%
Democratic	Edwin C. Johnson	87,700	
Democratic	E. V. Holland	30,308	
Total votes			

=== Republican primary ===
==== Candidates ====
- James D. Parriott, attorney
- Warren F. Bleecker, state representative

==== Results ====
Republican primary results
Party	Candidate	Votes	%
Republican	James D. Parriott	77,430	
Republican	Warren F. Bleecker	35,574	
Total votes			

== General election ==
=== Candidates ===
Major party candidates

- Edwin C. Johnson, Democratic
- James D. Parriott, Republican

Other candidates

- Morton Alexander, Socialist
- William Penn Collins, Farmer–Labor
- William R. Dietrich, Communist

=== Results ===
1932 Colorado gubernatorial election
Party	Candidate	Votes	%	±%
Democratic	Edwin C. Johnson	257,188	57.23%	−3.18%
Republican	James D. Parriott	183,258	40.78%	+2.72%
Socialist	Morton Alexander	6,226	1.39%	+0.71%
Farmer–Labor	William Penn Collins	1,685	0.38%	−0.06%
Communist	William R. Dietrich	1,012	0.23%	−0.01%
Majority		73,930	16.45%	
Turnout		449,369		
Democratic hold		Swing		
