= 1926 Colorado gubernatorial election =

- November 2, 1926
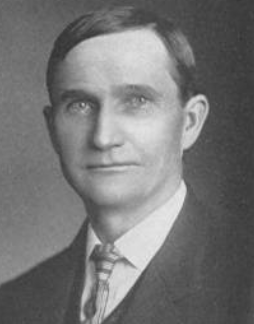

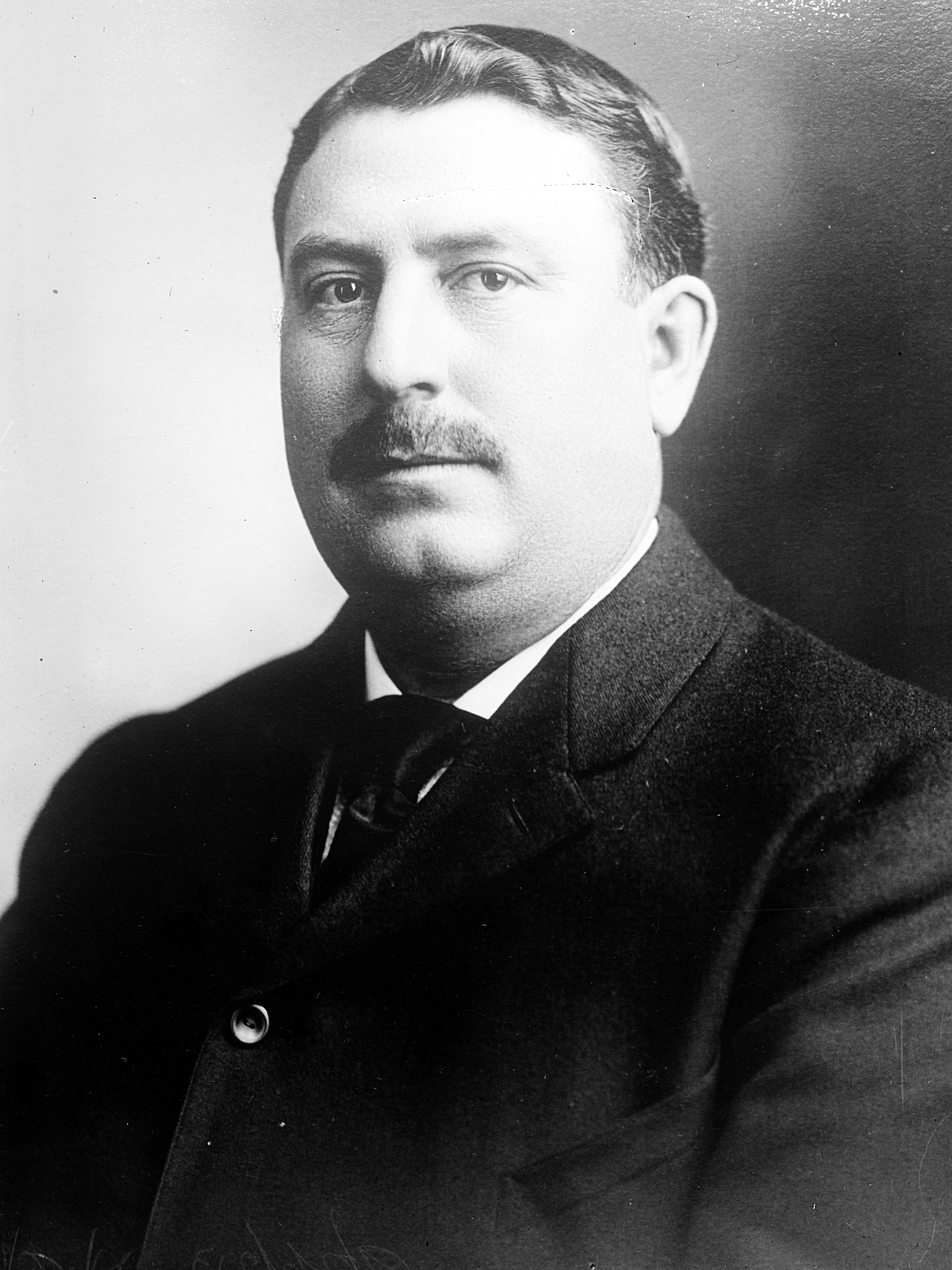
Nominee	Billy Adams	Oliver Henry Shoup
Party	Democratic	Republican
Popular vote	183,342	116,756
Percentage	59.84%	38.11%
- County results Adams: 40–50% 50–60% 60–70% 70–80% Shoup: 40–50% 50–60% 60–70%
Governor before election
Clarence Morley
Republican
Elected Governor
Billy Adams
Democratic

The 1926 Colorado gubernatorial election was held on November 2, 1926. Democratic nominee Billy Adams defeated Republican nominee Oliver Henry Shoup with 59.84% of the vote.

== Primary elections ==
Primary elections were held on September 14, 1926.

=== Democratic primary ===
==== Candidates ====
- Billy Adams, State Senator
- Samuel W. Johnson

==== Results ====
Democratic primary results
Party	Candidate	Votes	%
Democratic	Billy Adams	41,629	77.7%
Democratic	Samuel W. Johnson	11,922	22.3%
Total votes		53,511	

=== Republican primary ===
==== Candidates ====
- Oliver Henry Shoup, former Governor
- John F. Vivian
- Carl S. Milliken, Secretary of State of Colorado

==== Results ====
Republican primary results
Party	Candidate	Votes	%
Republican	Oliver Henry Shoup	58,639	49.7%
Republican	John F. Vivian	43,685	37.0%
Republican	Carl S. Milliken	15,658	13.3%
Total votes		117,982	

== General election ==
=== Candidates ===
Major party candidates

- Billy Adams, Democratic
- Oliver Henry Shoup, Republican

Other candidates

- Frank Cass, Farmer–Labor
- Edward F. Wright, Socialist
- William R. Dietrich, Workers
- Barney Haughey, Independent

=== Results ===
1926 Colorado gubernatorial election
Party	Candidate	Votes	%	±%
Democratic	Billy Adams	183,342	59.84%	+15.80%
Republican	Oliver Henry Shoup	116,756	38.11%	−13.81%
Farmer–Labor	Frank Cass	3,919	1.28%	−1.88%
Socialist	Edward F. Wright	1,508	0.49%	
Workers	William R. Dietrich	583	0.19%	−0.27%
Independent	Barney Haughey	294	0.10%	
Majority		66,586	21.73%	
Turnout		306,402%		
Democratic gain from Republican		Swing		
