= Oliver Henry Shoup =

American politician

Oliver Shoup
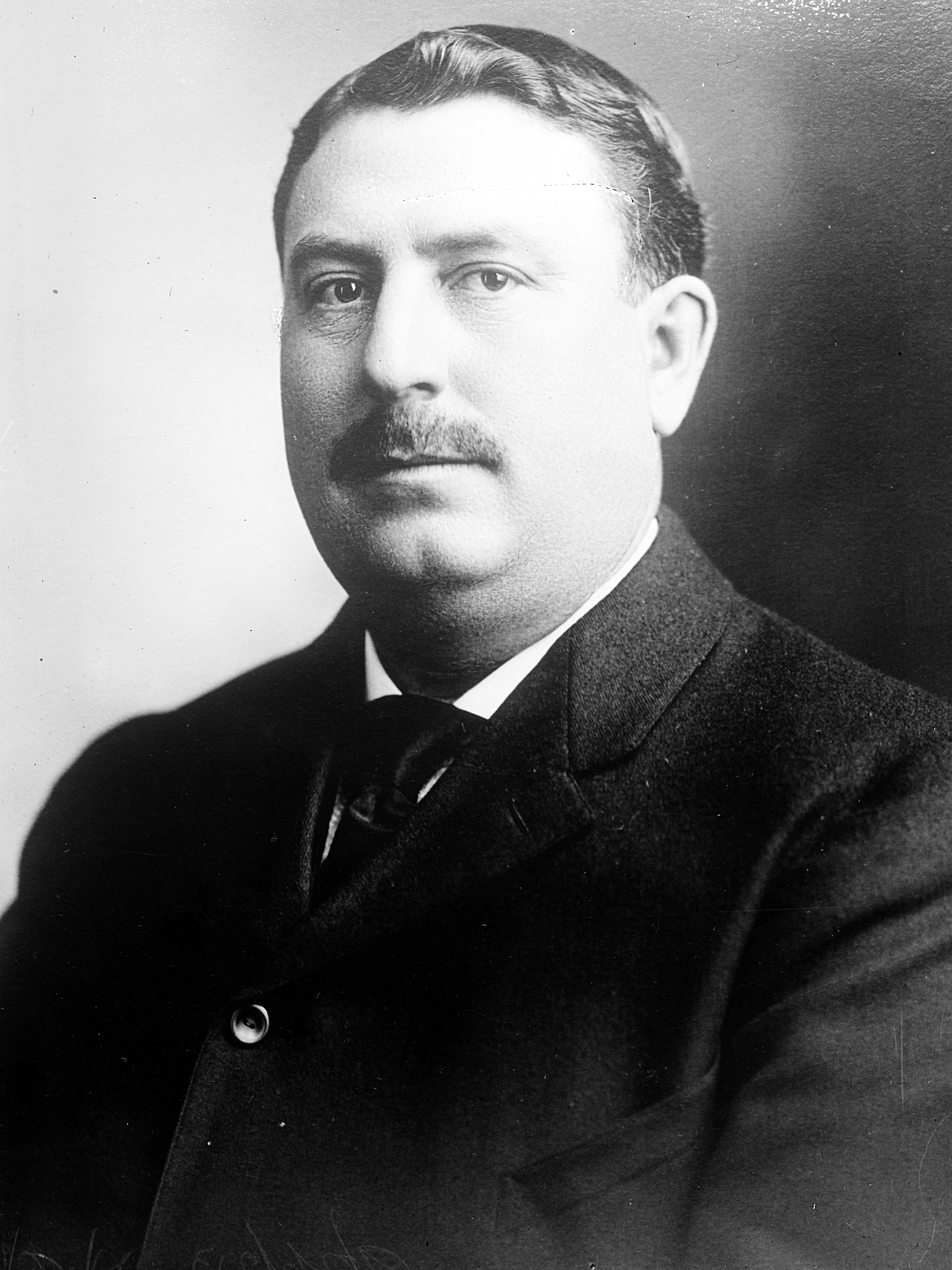

22nd Governor of Colorado
- In office January 14, 1919–January 9, 1923
- Lieutenant: George Stepham; Earl Cooley
- Preceded by: Julius Caldeen Gunter
- Succeeded by: William Ellery Sweet

Personal details
- Born: December 13, 1869 Champaign County, Illinois, U.S.
- Died: September 30, 1940 (aged 70) Santa Monica, California, U.S.
- Party: Republican
- Spouse(s): Unetta Small (1891-1927); Mary Hackett (1930-1940)
- Children: 4

Oliver Henry Nelson Shoup (December 13, 1869 – September 30, 1940) was the 22nd governor of Colorado from 1919 to 1923.

== Early life, education, and career ==
Oliver Shoup was born in Champaign County, Illinois on December 13, 1869, to William and Delia Shoup. His father was a Union Army soldier during the American Civil War. He lived in Illinois, until he was 13 years old, when they moved to Colorado Springs, Colorado in 1882. He attended public school and went to Colorado College. He left college in 1888 to pursue a business career. He worked for different companies before finding success in the oil industry. Shoup served as the first president of the Midwest Oil Company and the Midwest Refining Company in 1914. He also was the director for multiple banks across the state of Colorado.

== Politics ==
Shoup was elected governor of Colorado on November 5, 1918, and re-elected for a second term on November 2, 1920. While governor, the Colorado National Guard was restructured and the State Highway Department was founded. The bonded debt of Colorado was also decreased during his tenure. Shoup was a strong proponent of prohibition in the state of Colorado and nationwide. In early 1922 Denver's lawmakers in the state legislature found an opening. Pueblo had been devastated by a flood, and Gov. Oliver Henry Shoup called an emergency session of the legislature. Denver lawmakers now had power over Pueblo. They would vote for emergency funding for the beleaguered town (an economic rival to Denver) in return for legislation authorizing the issuance of bonds for Denver's tunnel. A deal was struck, and on April 29, the Moffat Tunnel Improvement District was created, with the Moffat Tunnel considered one of Shoup's lasting legacies. Shoup declined to run for a third term and left the governor's office on January 9, 1923, returning to work in the private business sector. Shoup ran once again for governor of Colorado in 1926 but was unsuccessful.

== Personal life ==
Shoup was married Unetta Small, the daughter of William Small, on September 18, 1891. They had four children together: Reba, Oliver Jr., Merill, and Verner. Shoup and his family were of the Presbyterian faith. Unetta died in 1927. Shoup remarried in 1930 to Mary Alice Hackett. In his final years, he moved to Santa Monica, California where he retired from public life.

== Death ==
He died of a heart attack on September 30, 1940, in his home in Santa Monica, California and is buried at Evergreen Cemetery in Colorado Springs.

Party political offices
Preceded by George Alfred Carlson	Republican nominee for Governor of Colorado; 1918, 1920	Succeeded by Benjamin Griffith
Preceded by Clarence Morley	Republican nominee for Governor of Colorado; 1926	Succeeded by William L. Boatright
Political offices
Preceded by Julius Caldeen Gunter	Governor of Colorado; 1919–1923	Succeeded by William Ellery Sweet
