= James Hamilton Peabody =

American politician (1852–1917)

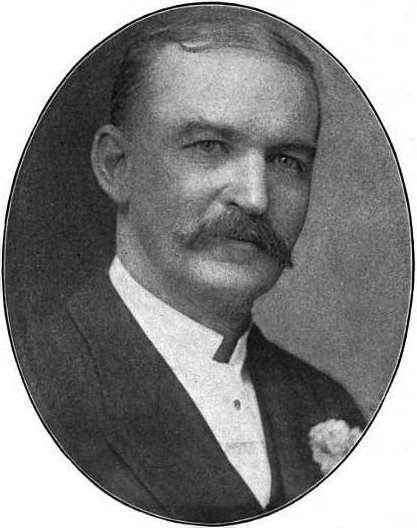

13th and 15th Governor of Colorado
- In office March 17, 1905
- Lieutenant: Jesse Fuller McDonald
- Preceded by: Alva Adams
- Succeeded by: Jesse Fuller McDonald
- In office January 13, 1903 – January 10, 1905
- Lieutenant: Warren A. Haggott
- Preceded by: James Bradley Orman
- Succeeded by: Alva Adams

Personal details
- Born: August 21, 1852 Topsham, Vermont, US
- Died: November 23, 1917 (aged 65) Cañon City, Colorado, US
- Party: Republican
- Spouse: Frances Lillian Clelland (m. 1878)
- Children: 4
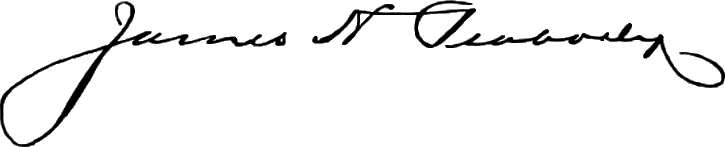
- Signature

James Hamilton Peabody (August 21, 1852 – November 23, 1917) was the 13th and 15th governor of Colorado, and is noted by some for his public service in Cañon City and by others for his brutality in crushing the miners' strike in Cripple Creek in 1903–04.

== Family background ==
James was the youngest of 17 children. He was born in Topsham, Vermont, where his family raised crops and children. He attended school in Vermont, and later furthered his education there at the Bryant Commercial College at Barre, and Stratton Commercial College at Burlington, Vermont. Three of his brothers fought for the Union in the American Civil War. In 1871, while James was still in business college there, his family moved to Pueblo, Colorado; after completing his degree the following year, Peabody followed his family and kept the books for the family dry goods store for three years (1872 to 1875).

== Early employment ==
In early 1875, he moved to Cañon City, Colorado, and worked for James Clelland in his "general mercantile" store. On March 19, 1878, he married his employer's daughter, Frances Lillian Clelland, and the couple eventually had four children together (James, Clellan, Cora May, and Jessie Anne). Peabody quickly climbed the ladder at Clelland's store, becoming a manager, then a full partner, and then purchasing the store outright in 1882. In 1885, he was elected county clerk for Fremont County, Colorado, unseating the incumbent, who had held the post for 18 years.

== Public service ==
In 1889, while still serving in the position of county clerk, Peabody helped to organize the First National Bank of Cañon City, and was elected President of the Bank in 1891. He also served Cañon City as city treasurer for two years and as alderman for two years. He helped organize the Cañon City Water Works Company and served as its secretary and treasurer for many years. He was instrumental in forming the Electric Light Company of Cañon City and served as that organization's first president. In addition, he was a member of the Masonic fraternity, and, in 1885, at the age of 32, he was elected Grand Master of the Colorado Masons; at that time, he was the youngest Grand Master Mason in America.

== Administration as governor ==
=== Election ===
Because of his contributions to Cañon City, Fremont County, and the State of Colorado at large, he became widely known in state politics and was an active member of the Colorado Republican Party; in 1902, he was the Republican candidate for Governor of Colorado. He ran on a "law and order" platform and was elected, but his administration met with numerous difficulties, especially labor issues in Colorado's many mines.

=== Problems ===
During Peabody's administration, miners' unions acted on a variety of issues, including wages, hours, and working conditions. One particular issue of consequence was the eight-hour day, and miners conducted strikes in the gold and silver mines at Clear Creek, Cripple Creek, and Telluride, and in the coal mines of Las Animas County. Peabody's tactic in dealing with these strikes was to call out the Colorado National Guard whenever he felt it necessary, a strategy many felt was heavy-handed.

The union representing hard rock miners was the Western Federation of Miners (WFM). The coal miners' union was the United Mine Workers (UMW). Some of the officials in Teller County, and particularly in the Cripple Creek District, were considered sympathetic to the union. In 1903 the WFM called a strike in support of mill workers.

==== Strike ====
While the Federation worked to expel all non-union miners from the county, mine owners refused to negotiate over the Federation's complaints, and the struggle degenerated into violence by both parties; while the mine owners tried desperately to import non-union miners from elsewhere in the state, the union used its clout to barricade roads and rail lines into Cripple Creek. The owners appealed to Peabody, who dispatched an investigatory committee from Denver to look into the situation; on the committee's recommendation, Peabody ordered the state militia to "defuse" the situation. On September 4, 1903, almost 1,000 militiamen entered Teller County and essentially established martial law.

On June 6, 1904, after nine months of the strike, someone destroyed the Independence Railway Station near Victor, Colorado, with dynamite, killing 13 non-union miners. County Sheriff Henry Robertson became a target of the Cripple Creek Mine Owners' Association and their ally, the Citizens' Alliance, and was forced to resign under threat of hanging. The mine owners used force to take over the press of the Victor Record, which had been a largely pro-union periodical, and captured strikers, who were then confined in the infamous "bullpens" or taken under guard to the Kansas border and abandoned.

The Colorado National Guard made several dozen unwarranted arrests of miners and their supporters and held many people without formal charges, some for several days. Colorado National Guard Adjutant General Sherman Bell said of the miners, "Habeas corpus, hell! We'll give 'em post mortems." With the support of the state militia, the owners regained control of the mines, and by midsummer the strike was broken (although it was never officially terminated by the Federation). The mines reopened with non-union labor, and the labor unions lost significant power in Cripple Creek, and in the state.

A union member named Harry Orchard later wrote in a confession to Pinkerton agent James McParland that he had committed the attack at the Independence Station. He also admitted to serving as a paid informant for the Mine Owners Association, and to committing numerous other crimes.

Peabody's role in helping mine owners crush the strike at Cripple Creek and, ultimately, the union itself, is particularly ugly. The miners had conducted a nonviolent strike nine years earlier and their policy was one of nonviolence. But when Peabody, a banker, was elected governor of Colorado, Cripple Creek mine owners felt they had an ally and they could provoke the miners with impunity. The mine owners cut back hard-earned benefits and it was those cutbacks that caused the strike of 1903–04. In response to the strike, Peabody sent in The Colorado National Guard which broke into miner's homes, harassed their wives and children, and forcefully deported union men out of Cripple Creek. Peabody's militia arrested and jailed miners against whom there were no charges, often removing them from their homes. When judicial authorities objected to this illegal treatment Peabody tried to suspend the writ of habeas corpus that was being used to protect illegally-arrested miners. When miners resisted military violence, Peabody responded with martial law. His troops destroyed the offices of the press and assumed military command of Cripple Creek until both the strike and the union had been destroyed.

Peabody also used repression against the coal miners strike in 1903-1904. He used the Colorado militia to round up and deport strikers and strike leaders. By June of 1904 more than 189 strikers had been jailed, often without formal charges having been filed against them. State troops then forced 97 strikers to leave the state. One contingent of deportees was dumped in Kansas. Another was left in the New Mexico desert.

=== Attempt at re-election ===
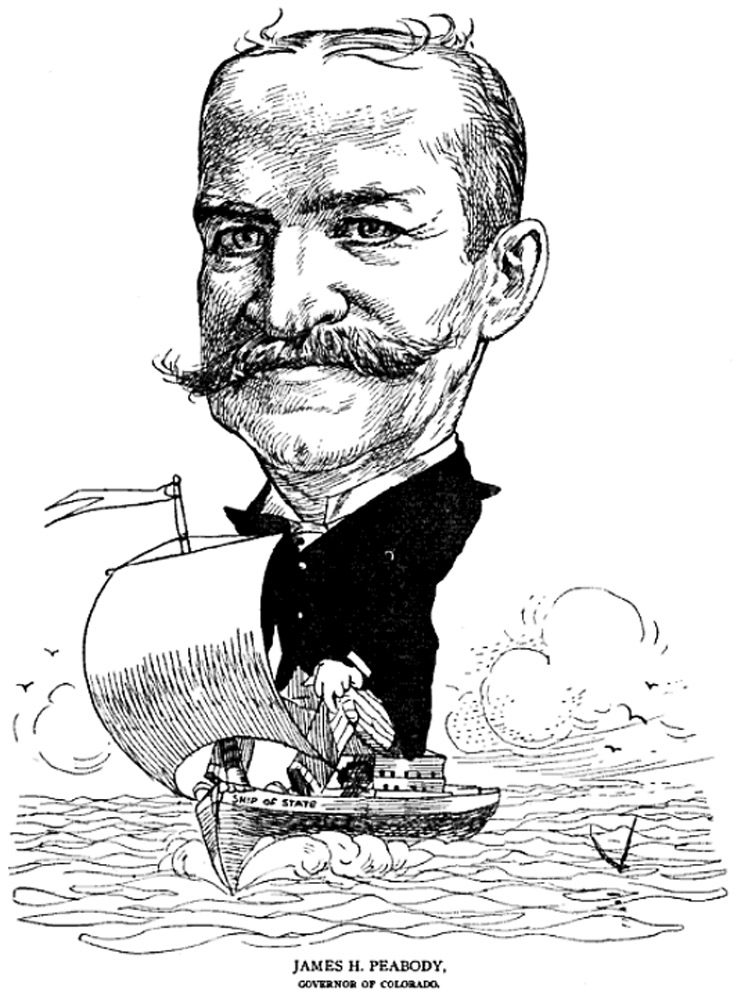
1904 caricature of Colorado Governor James H. Peabody executed by B.S. White of American Cartoonist Magazine

Peabody ran for a second term in 1904, but was vilified by his opponents, who declared "Anybody but Peabody!" and felt that he was in league with the mine owners. Peabody's opponent, Democrat Alva Adams, ripped into his handling of the Cripple Creek strike and insisted that he could handle Colorado's vicious "industrial warfare." After the election, it appeared Adams had won, but Republicans, who still controlled the state legislature, insisted that significant fraud and corruption had conspired to steal the election from Peabody (in reality, both sides had committed major violations of election law). On the day that Adams took office (March 17, 1905), the Republican-controlled legislature voted to remove him from office and reinstall Peabody, on the condition that Peabody immediately resign. He did so, and at day's end it was Peabody's lieutenant governor, Jesse McDonald, who occupied the governor's mansion in Denver – thus making Colorado the only state to have three different governors (Adams, Peabody, McDonald) on the same day.

== Death ==
After his "victory" and resignation, Peabody returned to Cañon City and retired to private life at the Peabody Mansion built by his father-in-law and employer, James Clelland. There he devoted his time to caring for his various financial interests. He largely faded from the public eye, and died November 23, 1917. He is buried in Cañon City.

Party political offices
Preceded by Frank C. Goudy	Republican nominee for Governor of Colorado; 1902, 1904	Succeeded by Henry Augustus Buchtel
Political offices
Preceded by James Bradley Orman	Governor of Colorado; 1903-1905	Succeeded by Alva Adams
Preceded by Alva Adams	Governor of Colorado; 1905	Succeeded by Jesse Fuller McDonald
