= 1934 Colorado gubernatorial election =

- November 6, 1934
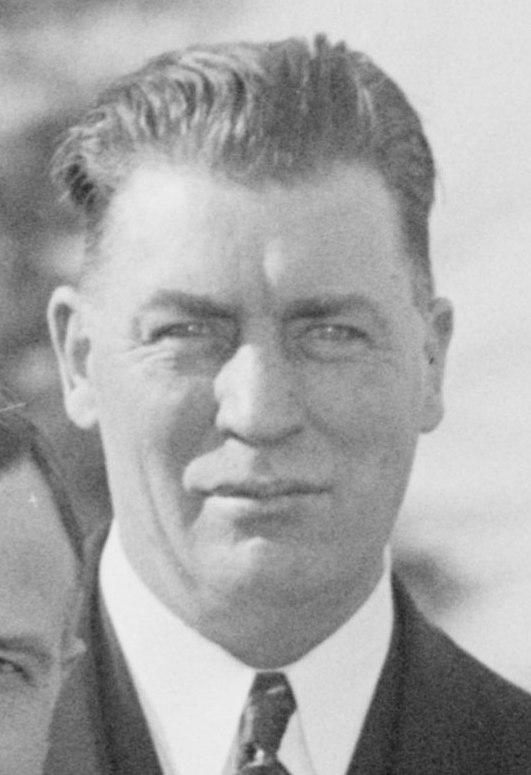

Nominee	Edwin C. Johnson	Nathan C. Warren
Party	Democratic	Republican
Popular vote	237,026	162,791
Percentage	58.11%	39.91%
- County results Johnson: 40–50% 50–60% 60–70% 70–80% Warren: 40–50% 50–60%
Governor before election
Edwin C. Johnson
Democratic
Elected Governor
Edwin C. Johnson
Democratic

The 1934 Colorado gubernatorial election was held on November 6, 1934. Incumbent Democrat Edwin C. Johnson defeated Republican nominee Nathan C. Warren with 58.11% of the vote.

== Primary elections ==
Primary elections were held on September 11, 1934.

=== Democratic primary ===
==== Candidates ====
- Edwin C. Johnson, incumbent Governor
- Josephine Roche, former Chair of the Colorado Progressive Party

==== Results ====
Democratic primary results
Party	Candidate	Votes	%
Democratic	Edwin C. Johnson (incumbent)	76,240	54.7%
Democratic	Josephine Roche	63,107	45.3%
Total votes		139,347	

=== Republican primary ===
==== Candidates ====
- Nathan C. Warren, State Senator

==== Results ====
Republican primary results
Party	Candidate	Votes	%
Republican	Nathan C. Warren	62,265	100.00
Total votes		62,265	100.00

== General election ==
=== Candidates ===
Major party candidates

- Edwin C. Johnson, Democratic
- Nathan C. Warren, Republican

Other candidates

- Paul S. McCormick, Socialist
- Paul W. Hipp, Prohibition
- P. C. Feste, Communist

=== Results ===
1934 Colorado gubernatorial election
Party	Candidate	Votes	%	±%
Democratic	Edwin C. Johnson (incumbent)	237,026	58.11%	+0.88%
Republican	Nathan C. Warren	162,791	39.91%	−0.87%
Socialist	Paul S. McCormick	5,355	1.31%	−0.08%
Prohibition	Paul W. Hipp	1,430	0.35%	
Communist	P. C. Feste	1,290	0.32%	+0.09%
Majority		74,235	18.20%	+1.75%
Turnout		407,892		
Democratic hold		Swing		
