= 1920 Colorado gubernatorial election =

- November 2, 1920
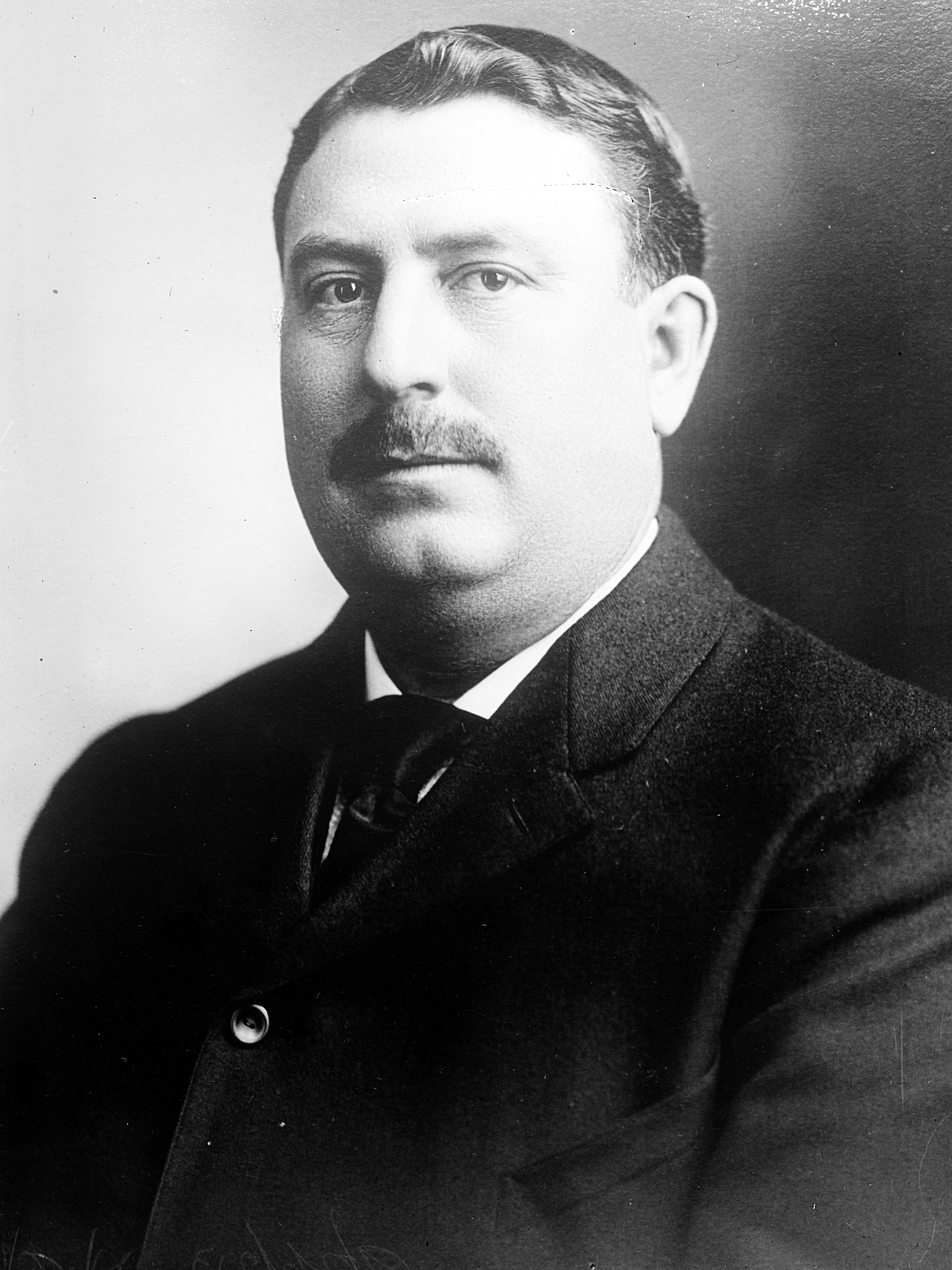

Nominee	Oliver Henry Shoup	James M. Collins
Party	Republican	Democratic
Popular vote	174,488	108,738
Percentage	59.55%	37.11%
- County results Shoup: 40–50% 50–60% 60–70% 70–80% Collins: 40–50% 50–60%
Governor before election
Oliver Henry Shoup
Republican
Elected Governor
Oliver Henry Shoup
Republican

The 1920 Colorado gubernatorial election was held on November 2, 1920. Incumbent Republican Oliver Henry Shoup defeated Democratic nominee James M. Collins with 59.55% of the vote.

== Primary elections ==
Primary elections were held on September 14, 1920.

=== Democratic primary ===
==== Candidates ====
- James M. Collins

==== Results ====
Democratic primary results
Party	Candidate	Votes	%
Democratic	James M. Collins	32,400	100.00
Total votes		32,400	100.00

=== Republican primary ===
==== Candidates ====
- Oliver Henry Shoup, incumbent Governor
- Robert H. Higgins, former Colorado State Treasurer

==== Results ====
Republican primary results
Party	Candidate	Votes	%
Republican	Oliver Henry Shoup (incumbent)	66,692	
Republican	Robert H. Higgins	21,566	
Total votes			

== General election ==
=== Candidates ===
Major party candidates

- Oliver Henry Shoup, Republican
- James M. Collins, Democratic

Other candidates

- William Penn Collins, Farmer–Labor

=== Results ===
1920 Colorado gubernatorial election
Party	Candidate	Votes	%	±%
Republican	Oliver Henry Shoup (incumbent)	174,488	59.55%	+8.40%
Democratic	James M. Collins	108,738	37.11%	−9.36%
Farmer–Labor	William Penn Collins	9,804	3.35%	N/A
Majority		65,750	22.44%	+17.76%
Turnout		293,030		
Republican hold		Swing		
