= 1918 Colorado gubernatorial election =

- November 5, 1918
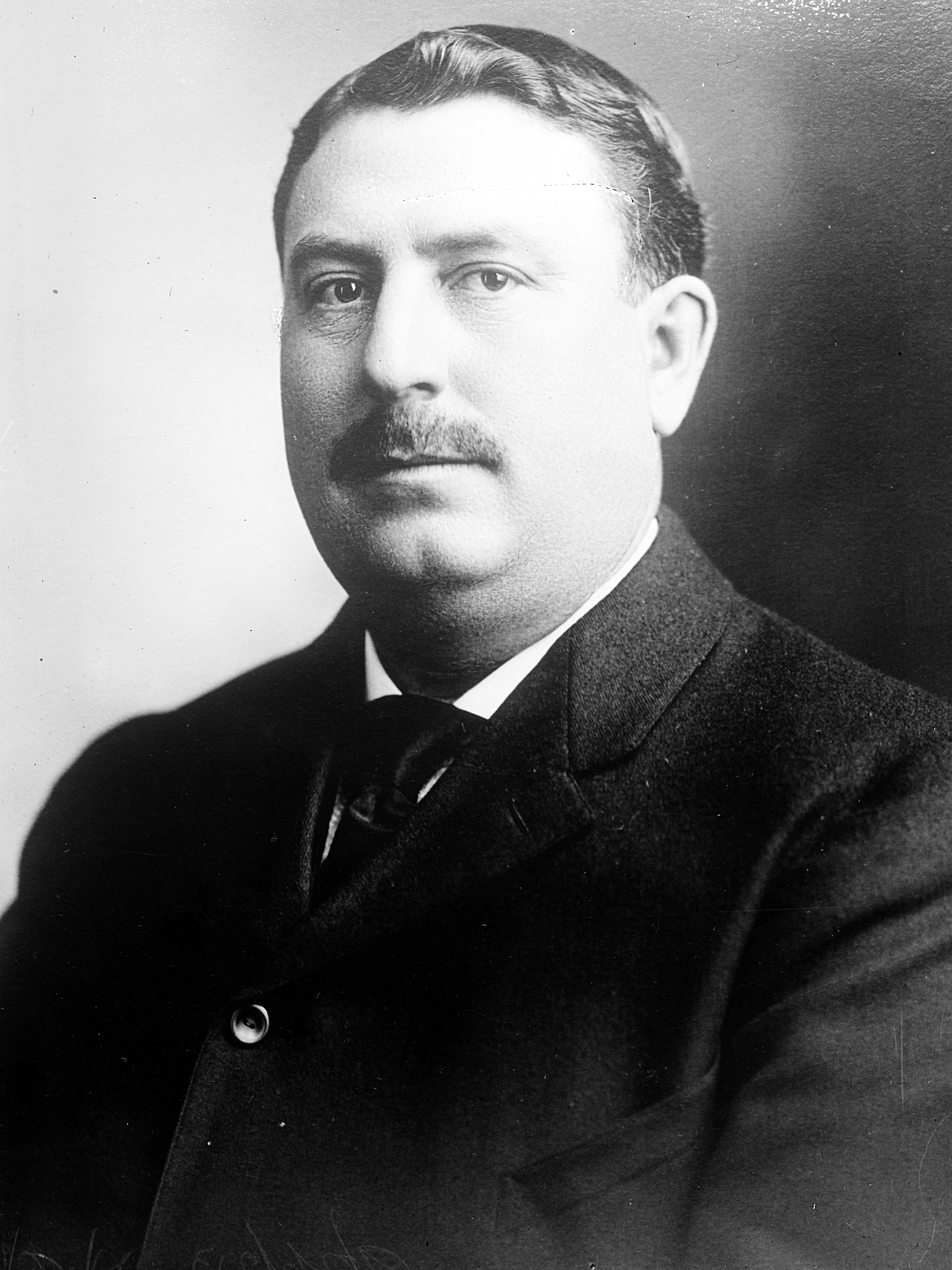

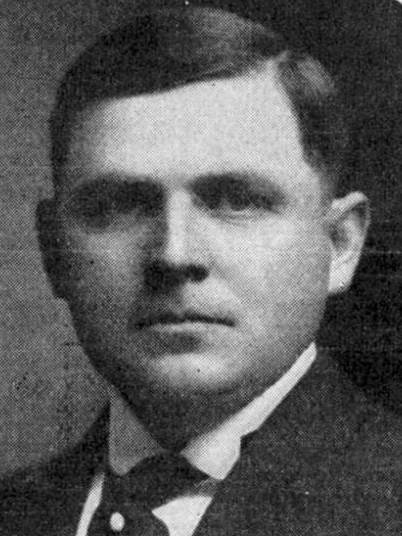
Nominee	Oliver Henry Shoup	Thomas J. Tynan
Party	Republican	Democratic
Popular vote	112,693	102,397
Percentage	51.15%	46.47%
- County results Shoup: 40–50% 50–60% 60–70% Tynan: 40–50% 50–60% 60–70% 70–80%
Governor before election
Julius Caldeen Gunter
Democratic
Elected Governor
Oliver Henry Shoup
Republican

The 1918 Colorado gubernatorial election was held on November 5, 1918. Republican nominee Oliver Henry Shoup defeated Democratic nominee Thomas J. Tynan with 51.15% of the vote.

== Primary elections ==
Primary elections were held on September 10, 1918.

=== Democratic primary ===
==== Candidates ====
- Thomas J. Tynan, Colorado State Penitentiary Warden

==== Results ====
Democratic primary results
Party	Candidate	Votes	%
Democratic	Thomas J. Tynan	102,397	100.00
Total votes		102,397	100.00

=== Republican primary ===
==== Candidates ====
- Oliver Henry Shoup, businessman

==== Results ====
Republican primary results
Party	Candidate	Votes	%
Republican	Oliver Henry Shoup	112,693	100.00
Total votes		112,693	100.00

== General election ==
=== Candidates ===
Major party candidates

- Oliver Henry Shoup, Republican
- Thomas J. Tynan, Democratic

Other candidates

- Mary L. Geffs, Socialist

=== Results ===
1918 Colorado gubernatorial election
Party	Candidate	Votes	%	±%
Republican	Oliver Henry Shoup	112,693	51.15%	+9.87%
Democratic	Thomas J. Tynan	102,397	46.47%	−6.80%
Socialist	Mary L. Geffs	5,251	2.38%	−2.00%
Majority		10,296	4.68%	
Turnout		220,341		
Republican gain from Democratic		Swing		
