= 1940 Colorado gubernatorial election =

- November 5, 1940
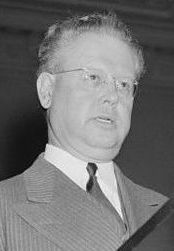

Nominee	Ralph Lawrence Carr	George E. Saunders
Party	Republican	Democratic
Popular vote	296,671	245,292
Percentage	54.37%	44.96%
- County results Carr: 50–60% 60–70% Saunders: 50–60%
Governor before election
Ralph Lawrence Carr
Republican
Elected Governor
Ralph Lawrence Carr
Republican

The 1940 Colorado gubernatorial election was held on November 5, 1940. Incumbent Republican Ralph Lawrence Carr defeated Democratic nominee George E. Saunders with 54.37% of the vote.

== Primary elections ==
Primary elections were held on September 10, 1940.

=== Democratic primary ===
==== Candidates ====
- George E. Saunders, Secretary of State of Colorado
- John A. Carroll, District Attorney of Denver
- George J. Knapp

==== Results ====
Democratic primary results
Party	Candidate	Votes	%
Democratic	George E. Saunders	75,130	57.0%
Democratic	John A. Carroll	50,787	38.5%
Democratic	George J. Knapp	5,967	4.5%
Total votes		131,884	

=== Republican primary ===
==== Candidates ====
- Ralph Lawrence Carr, incumbent Governor

==== Results ====
Republican primary results
Party	Candidate	Votes	%
Republican	Ralph Lawrence Carr (incumbent)	95,521	100.00
Total votes		95,521	100.00

== General election ==
=== Candidates ===
Major party candidates

- Ralph Lawrence Carr, Republican
- George E. Saunders, Democratic

Other candidates

- Carle Whitehead, Socialist
- Laurence W. Coffman, Prohibition

=== Results ===
1940 Colorado gubernatorial election
Party	Candidate	Votes	%	±%
Republican	Ralph Lawrence Carr (incumbent)	296,671	54.37%	−1.45%
Democratic	George E. Saunders	245,292	44.96%	+1.30%
Socialist	Carle Whitehead	2,211	0.41%	
Prohibition	Laurence W. Coffman	1,462	0.27%	
Majority		51,379	9.41%	−2.75%
Turnout		545,636		
Republican hold		Swing		
