= 1890 Colorado gubernatorial election =

- November 4, 1890
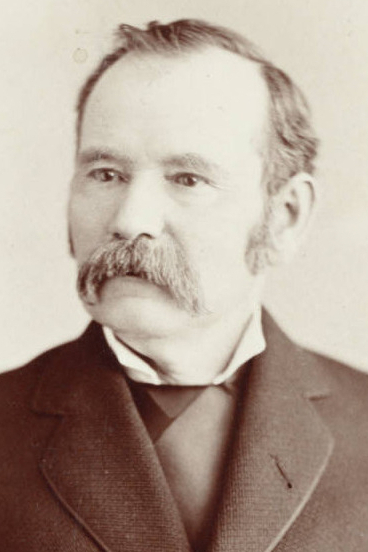

Nominee	John Long Routt	Caldwell Yeaman	John G. Coy
Party	Republican	Democratic	Labor
Popular vote	41,827	35,359	5,199
Percentage	50.11%	42.36%	6.23%
- County results Routt: 30–40% 40–50% 50–60% 60–70% 70–80% Yeaman: 40–50% 50–60% 60–70% Coy: 30–40% 40–50%
Governor before election
Job Adams Cooper
Republican
Elected Governor
John Long Routt
Republican

The 1890 Colorado gubernatorial election was held on November 4, 1890. Republican nominee John Long Routt defeated Democratic nominee Caldwell Yeaman with 50.11% of the vote.

== General election ==
=== Candidates ===
Democratic

- John Long Routt, former governor

Republican

- Caldwell Yeaman, former judge

Union Labor

- John G. Coy, activist and journalist

Prohibition

- John A. Elett, prohibitionist

=== Results ===
1890 Colorado gubernatorial election
Party	Candidate	Votes	%	±%
Republican	John Long Routt	41,827	50.11%	−3.73%
Democratic	Caldwell Yeaman	35,359	42.36%	−0.28%
Labor	John G. Coy	5,199	6.23%	N/A
Prohibition	John A. Elett	1,058	1.27%	−1.01%
Majority		6,468	7.75%	
Turnout		83,443		
Republican hold		Swing		

County	Routt %	Routt #	Yeaman %	Yeaman #	Coy %	Coy #	Ellett %	Ellett #	Total
Arapahoe	53.81%	11,331	42.30%	8,907	2.71%	572	1.16%	246	21,056
Archuleta	43.20%	70	56.79%	92	0.00%	0	0.00%	0	162
Baca	52.24%	163	47.75%	149	0.00%	0	0.00%	0	312
Bent	48.08%	163	46.60%	158	4.71%	16	0.58%	2	339
Boulder	47.92%	1,486	44.43%	1,378	3.54%	110	4.09%	127	3,101
Chaffee	51.50%	977	46.28%	878	1.58%	30	0.63%	12	1,897
Cheyenne	63.35%	83	36.64%	48	0.00%	0	0.00%	0	131
Clear Creek	58.95%	1,024	38.16%	663	0.46%	8	2.41%	42	1,737
Conejos	71.67%	1,144	24.18%	386	4.07%	65	0.06%	1	1,596
Costilla	64.95%	467	22.80%	164	12.23%	88	0.00%	0	719
Custer	55.34%	440	43.27%	344	1.13%	9	0.25%	2	795
Delta	32.06%	177	25.36%	140	42.39%	234	0.18%	1	552
Dolores	61.27%	318	38.72%	201	0.00%	0	0.00%	0	519
Douglas	54.30%	410	45.56%	344	0.13%	1	0.00%	0	755
Eagle	46.98%	397	51.47%	435	1.53%	13	0.00%	0	845
El Paso	61.05%	2,162	36.31%	1,286	0.16%	6	2.45%	87	3,541
Elbert	55.50%	232	44.49%	186	0.00%	0	0.00%	0	418
Fremont	44.07%	852	33.05%	639	20.12%	389	2.74%	53	1,933
Garfield	58.15%	720	39.17%	485	2.10%	26	0.56%	7	1,238
Gilpin	49.10%	716	47.05%	686	0.00%	0	3.84%	56	1,458
Grand	65.76%	146	34.23%	76	0.00%	0	0.00%	0	222
Gunnison	54.07%	856	39.86%	631	5.62%	89	0.44%	7	1,583
Hinsdale	51.47%	175	39.41%	134	8.82%	30	0.29%	1	340
Huerfano	44.50%	623	43.50%	609	12.00%	168	0.00%	0	1,400
Jefferson	50.66%	918	41.94%	760	2.59%	47	4.80%	87	1,812
Kiowa	53.87%	146	42.06%	114	4.05%	11	0.00%	0	271
Kit Carson	62.44%	266	35.68%	152	1.87%	8	0.00%	0	426
La Plata	47.20%	575	45.32%	552	7.22%	88	0.24%	3	1,218
Lake	21.42%	858	63.03%	2,524	15.53%	622	0.00%	0	4,004
Larimer	48.95%	1,031	33.52%	706	12.63%	266	4.89%	103	2,106
Las Animas	34.70%	1,038	49.41%	1,478	15.88%	475	0.00%	0	2,991
Lincoln	51.24%	82	48.75%	78	0.00%	0	0.00%	0	160
Logan	50.09%	265	28.16%	149	19.09%	101	2.64%	14	529
Mesa	47.02%	537	45.53%	520	2.62%	30	4.81%	55	1,142
Montezuma	41.95%	185	49.88%	220	8.16%	36	0.00%	0	441
Montrose	31.46%	270	32.40%	278	36.13%	310	0.00%	0	858
Morgan	53.82%	218	18.51%	75	27.40%	111	0.24%	1	405
Otero	48.45%	393	51.04%	414	0.49%	4	0.00%	0	811
Ouray	48.63%	959	47.10%	929	4.20%	83	0.05%	1	1,972
Park	48.55%	589	51.45%	624	0.00%	0	0.00%	0	1,213
Phillips	36.46%	171	29.85%	140	33.68%	158	0.00%	0	469
Pitkin	47.21%	1,298	52.38%	1,440	0.25%	7	0.14%	4	2,749
Prowers	59.72%	264	38.00%	168	2.26%	10	0.00%	0	442
Pueblo	48.32%	2,159	41.38%	1,849	9.08%	406	1.20%	54	4,468
Rio Blanco	48.38%	165	49.56%	169	2.05%	7	0.00%	0	341
Rio Grande	65.61%	456	23.45%	163	10.35%	72	0.57%	4	695
Routt	59.85%	404	40.00%	270	0.14%	1	0.00%	0	675
Saguache	57.70%	837	42.05%	352	0.11%	1	0.11%	1	837
San Juan	57.88%	481	42.11%	350	0.00%	0	0.00%	0	831
San Miguel	49.09%	489	50.50%	503	0.00%	0	0.40%	4	996
Sedgwick	64.20%	165	33.46%	86	2.33%	6	0.00%	0	257
Summit	48.19%	454	51.80%	489	0.00%	0	0.00%	0	942
Washington	66.81%	298	29.82%	133	1.79%	8	1.56%	7	446
Weld	47.77%	1,040	34.35%	748	14.74%	321	3.12%	68	2,177
Yuma	37.84%	165	25.00%	109	36.69%	160	0.45%	2	436

Counties that flipped from Republican to Democratic

- Archuleta
- Eagle
- Lake
- Montezuma
- Otero
- Park
- Pitkin
- San Miguel
- Summit
- Rio Blanco

Counties that flipped from Democratic to Republican

- Huerfano

Counties that flipped from Republican to Labor

- Delta
- Montrose
