= Alva Adams (governor) =

American politician (1850–1922)

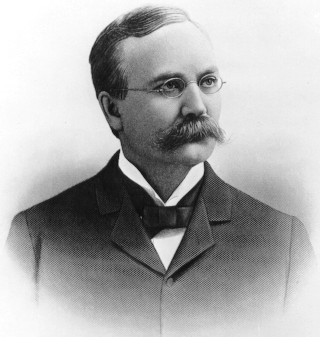

5th, 10th & 14th Governor of Colorado
- In office January 10, 1905 – March 17, 1905
- Lieutenant: Arthur Cornforth
- Preceded by: James Hamilton Peabody
- Succeeded by: James Hamilton Peabody
- In office January 12, 1897 – January 10, 1899
- Lieutenant: Jared L. Brush
- Preceded by: Albert McIntire
- Succeeded by: Charles S. Thomas
- In office January 11, 1887 – January 8, 1889
- Lieutenant: Norman H. Meldrum
- Preceded by: Benjamin H. Eaton
- Succeeded by: Job A. Cooper

Personal details
- Born: May 14, 1850 Adamsville, Wisconsin, U.S.
- Died: November 1, 1922 (aged 72) Battle Creek, Michigan, U.S.
- Party: Democratic
- Parents: John Adams (father); Eliza Blanchard (mother)
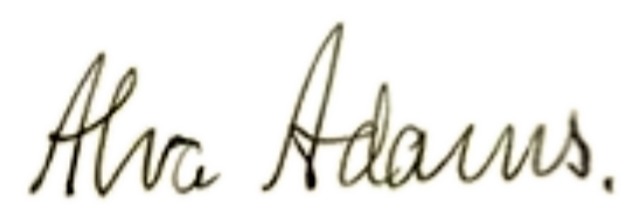
- Signature

Alva Adams (May 14, 1850 – November 1, 1922) was an American politician and three-time governor of Colorado.

== Early life ==
Adams was born in Adamsville, Wisconsin on May 14, 1850. He was son of John Adams and Eliza Blanchard. His father, was a member of the Wisconsin State Assembly and the Wisconsin State Senate. Adams was educated in the public schools of Wisconsin, and in 1871 went to Colorado.

== Career ==
A Democrat, Adams was a member of the first Colorado legislature in 1876. He served four years and two months as the fifth, tenth and 14th governor of Colorado from 1887 to 1889, 1897 to 1899, and briefly in 1905. His last tenure as governor lasted a little over two months. He and the previous governor, James H. Peabody, each declared the other an illegitimate governor, even though both were involved in illegal electoral practices. Eventually the Republican legislature removed Adams and installed Peabody, who immediately resigned in favor of his lieutenant governor, Jesse Fuller McDonald, and the issue ended.

On November 1, 1922, Adams died in Battle Creek, Michigan at the age of 72.

Adams County, Colorado, is named for Alva Adams, and it is believed the city of Alva, Oklahoma is as well. Mount Adams in the Sangre de Cristo range N of Kit Carson Mountain is also almost certainly named after Adams.

Alva Adams' younger brother, William Herbert "Billy" Adams also served as Governor of Colorado from 1927 to 1933. Alva Adams' son, Alva Blanchard Adams, served as United States Senator from Colorado from 1923 to 1925 and from 1933 to 1941.

Party political offices
Preceded by James Benton Grant	Democratic nominee for Governor of Colorado; 1884, 1886	Succeeded by Thomas M. Patterson
Preceded by Charles S. Thomas	Democratic nominee for Governor of Colorado; 1896	Succeeded by Charles S. Thomas
Preceded by E. C. Stimson	Democratic nominee for Governor of Colorado; 1904, 1906	Succeeded by John F. Shafroth
Political offices
Preceded by Benjamin Harrison Eaton	Governor of Colorado; 1887–1889	Succeeded by Job Adams Cooper
Preceded by Albert McIntire	Governor of Colorado; 1897–1899	Succeeded by Charles Spalding Thomas
Preceded by James Hamilton Peabody	Governor of Colorado; 1905	Succeeded by James Hamilton Peabody
