= 1966 United States gubernatorial elections =

- November 8, 1966

35 governorships
	Majority party	Minority party
Party	Democratic	Republican
Seats before	33	17
Seats after	25	25
Seat change	▼8	▲8
Seats up	20	15
Seats won	12	23
- Democratic hold Democratic gain Republican hold Republican gain No election

United States gubernatorial elections were held on Tuesday November 8, in 35 states. 12 Democratic governors and 23 Republican governors won election, bringing the partisan reflection of the U.S. states to 25 Democrats and 25 Republicans. This election coincided with the Senate and the House elections. As of 2026, this is the last time the amount of governorships each party held was tied.

== Race summary ==
State	Governor	Party	First elected	Status	Candidates
Alabama	George Wallace	Democratic	1962	Incumbent term-limited. Democratic hold.	▌ ✓ Lurleen Wallace (Democratic) 63.4%; ▌James D. Martin (Republican) 31.0%; ▌Carl Robinson (Independent) 5.6%
Alaska	William A. Egan	Democratic	1958	Incumbent lost re-election. Republican gain.	▌ ✓ Wally Hickel (Republican) 50.0%; ▌William A. Egan (Democratic) 48.4%; ▌John F. Grasse (No Party) 1.6%
Arizona	Sam Goddard Jr.	Democratic	1964	Incumbent lost re-election. Republican gain.	▌ ✓ Jack Williams (Republican) 53.8%; ▌Sam Goddard Jr. (Democratic) 46.2%
Arkansas	Orval Faubus	Democratic	1954	Incumbent retired. Republican gain.	▌ ✓ Winthrop Rockefeller (Republican) 54.4%; ▌James D. Johnson (Democratic) 45.6%
California	Pat Brown	Democratic	1958	Incumbent lost re-election. Republican gain.	▌ ✓ Ronald Reagan (Republican) 57.6%; ▌Pat Brown (Democratic) 42.3%
Colorado	John A. Love	Republican	1962	Incumbent re-elected.	▌ ✓ John A. Love (Republican) 54.1%; ▌Robert Lee Knous (Democratic) 43.5%; ▌Levi Martinez (New Hispano) 2.5%
Connecticut	John N. Dempsey	Democratic	1961 (Note: Dempsey took office in 1961 after his predecessor (Abraham Ribicoff) resigned. He was subsequently elected in the 1962 Connecticut gubernatorial election.)	Incumbent re-elected.	▌ ✓ John N. Dempsey (Democratic) 55.7%; ▌E. Clayton Gengras (Republican) 44.3%
Florida	W. Haydon Burns	Democratic	1964	Incumbent lost renomination. New governor elected. Republican gain.	▌ ✓ Claude R. Kirk Jr. (Republican) 55.1%; ▌Robert King High (Democratic) 44.9%
Georgia	Carl Sanders	Democratic	1962	Incumbent term-limited. Democratic hold.	Election: ▌ Bo Callaway (Republican) 46.53%; ▌ Lester Maddox (Democratic) 46.22%; ▌Ellis Arnall (write-in) (Independent) 7.08%; Delegate count: ▌ ✓ Lester Maddox (Democratic) 182; ▌Bo Callaway (Republican) 66
Hawaii	John A. Burns	Democratic	1962	Incumbent re-elected.	▌ ✓ John A. Burns (Democratic) 51.1%; ▌Randolph Crossley (Republican) 48.9%
Idaho	Robert E. Smylie	Republican	1954	Incumbent lost renomination. New governor elected. Republican hold.	▌ ✓ Don Samuelson (Republican) 41.4%; ▌Cecil Andrus (Republican) 37.1%; ▌Perry Swisher (Independent) 12.2%; ▌Philip Jungert (Independent) 9.2%; ▌Don Walker (Independent) 0.1%
Iowa	Harold Hughes	Democratic	1962	Incumbent re-elected.	▌ ✓ Harold Hughes (Democratic) 55.3%; ▌William G. Murray (Republican) 44.2%; ▌David B. Quiner (American Constitution) 0.4%; ▌Charles Sloca (Iowa) 0.1%
Kansas	William H. Avery	Republican	1964	Incumbent lost re-election. Democratic gain.	▌ ✓ Robert Docking (Democratic) 54.8%; ▌William H. Avery (Republican) 43.9%; ▌Rolland Ernest Fisher (Prohibition) 0.7%; ▌Carson Crawford (Conservative) 0.6%
Maine	John H. Reed	Republican	1959 (Note: Reed became governor in 1959 after his predecessor (Clinton Clauson) died. He was subsequently elected in 1960 and 1962.)	Incumbent lost re-election. Democratic gain.	▌ ✓ Kenneth M. Curtis (Democratic) 53.1%; ▌John H. Reed (Republican) 46.9%
Maryland	J. Millard Tawes	Democratic	1958	Incumbent term-limited. Republican gain.	▌ ✓ Spiro Agnew (Republican) 49.5%; ▌George P. Mahoney (Democratic) 40.6%; ▌Hyman A. Pressman (Independent) 9.9%
Massachusetts	John A. Volpe	Republican	1960; 1962 (lost); 1964	Incumbent re-elected.	▌ ✓ John A. Volpe (Republican) 62.5%; ▌ Edward J. McCormack Jr. (Democratic) 36.9%; ▌Henning A. Blomen (Socialist Labor) 0.3%; ▌John C. Hedges (Prohibition) 0.2%
Michigan	George W. Romney	Republican	1962	Incumbent re-elected.	▌ ✓ George W. Romney (Republican) 60.5%; ▌Zolton Ferency (Democratic) 39.1%; ▌James Horvath (Socialist Labor) 0.3%
Minnesota	Karl Rolvaag	Democratic	1962	Incumbent lost re-election. Republican gain.	▌ ✓ Harold LeVander (Republican) 52.6%; ▌Karl Rolvaag (Democratic) 46.9%; ▌Kenneth Sachs (Industrial Government) 0.5%
Nebraska	Frank B. Morrison	Democratic	1960	Incumbent retired. Republican gain.	▌ ✓ Norbert Tiemann (Republican) 61.5%; ▌Philip Sorensen (Democratic) 38.4%
Nevada	Grant Sawyer	Democratic	1958	Incumbent lost re-election. Republican gain.	▌ ✓ Paul Laxalt (Republican) 52.1%; ▌Grant Sawyer (Democratic) 47.8%
New Hampshire	John W. King	Democratic	1962	Incumbent re-elected.	▌ ✓ John W. King (Democratic) 53.9%; ▌Hugh Gregg (Republican) 45.9%
New Mexico	Jack M. Campbell	Democratic	1962	Incumbent term-limited. Republican gain.	▌ ✓ David Cargo (Republican) 51.7%; ▌Thomas E. Lusk (Democratic) 48.2%
New York	Nelson Rockefeller	Republican	1958	Incumbent re-elected.	▌ ✓ Nelson Rockefeller (Republican) 44.6%; ▌Frank D. O'Connor (Democratic) 38.1%; ▌Paul Adams (Conservative) 8.5%; ▌Franklin D. Roosevelt Jr. (Liberal) 8.4%; ▌Milton Herder (Socialist Labor) 0.2%; ▌Judith White (Socialist Workers) 0.2%
Ohio	Jim Rhodes	Republican	1962	Incumbent re-elected.	▌ ✓ Jim Rhodes (Republican) 62.2%; ▌Frazier Reams Jr. (Democratic) 37.8%
Oklahoma	Henry Bellmon	Republican	1962	Incumbent term-limited. Republican hold.	▌ ✓ Dewey F. Bartlett (Republican) 55.7%; ▌Preston J. Moore (Democratic) 43.8%; ▌Harry E. Ingram (Independent) 0.6%
Oregon	Mark Hatfield	Republican	1958	Incumbent term-limited. Republican hold.	▌ ✓ Tom McCall (Republican) 55.3%; ▌Robert W. Straub (Democratic) 44.7%
Pennsylvania	William Scranton	Republican	1962	Incumbent term-limited. Republican hold.	▌ ✓ Raymond P. Shafer (Republican) 52.1%; ▌Milton Shapp (Democratic) 46.2%; ▌Edward S. Swartz (Constitutional) 1.4%; ▌George S. Taylor (Socialist Labor) 0.4%
Rhode Island	John Chafee	Republican	1962	Incumbent re-elected.	▌ ✓ John Chafee (Republican) 63.3%; ▌Horace E. Hobbs (Democratic) 36.7%
South Carolina	Robert Evander McNair	Democratic	1965 (Note: McNair became governor in 1965 when his predecessor (Donald S. Russell) resigned.)	Incumbent elected to full term.	▌ ✓ Robert Evander McNair (Democratic) 58.2%; ▌Joseph O. Rogers Jr. (Republican) 41.9%
South Dakota	Nils Boe	Republican	1964	Incumbent re-elected.	▌ ✓ Nils Boe (Republican) 57.7%; ▌Robert Chamberlin (Democratic) 42.3%
Tennessee	Frank G. Clement	Democratic	1952; 1962	Incumbent term-limited. Democratic hold.	▌ ✓ Buford Ellington (Democratic) 81.2%; ▌H.L. Crowder (Independent) 9.8%; ▌Charlie Moffett (Independent) 7.7%; ▌Charles Gordon Vick (Independent) 1.3%
Texas	John Connally	Democratic	1962	Incumbent re-elected.	▌ ✓ John Connally (Republican) 72.8%; ▌Thomas Everton Kennedy (Republican) 25.8%; ▌Tommye Gillespie (Constitution) 0.7%; ▌Brad Logan (Conservative) 0.7%
Vermont	Philip H. Hoff	Democratic	1962	Incumbent re-elected.	▌ ✓ Philip H. Hoff (Democratic) 57.7%; ▌Richard A. Snelling (Republican) 42.3%
Wisconsin	Warren P. Knowles	Republican	1964	Incumbent re-elected.	▌ ✓ Warren P. Knowles (Republican) 53.5%; ▌Patrick Lucey (Democratic) 46.1%; ▌Adolf Wiggert (Independent) 0.4%
Wyoming	Clifford Hansen	Republican	1962	Incumbent retired. Republican hold.	▌ ✓ Stanley K. Hathaway (Republican) 54.3%; ▌Ernest Wilkerson (Democratic) 45.7%

== Closest races ==
States where the margin of victory was under 5%:

1. Georgia, -0.31% (Note: Bo Callaway (R) won the popular vote 48.4–48.1%, but the Georgia State Assembly voted Lester Maddox (D) as the winner of the election after appeals were made.)
2. Alaska, 1.62%
3. Hawaii, 2.12%
4. New Mexico, 3.47%
5. Idaho, 4.30%
6. Nevada, 4.32%

States where the margin of victory was under 10%:

1. Minnesota, 5.61%
2. Pennsylvania, 5.97%
3. Maine, 6.24%
4. New York, 6.50%
5. Wisconsin, 7.42%
6. Arizona, 7.54%
7. New Hampshire, 7.97%
8. Wyoming, 8.58%
9. Arkansas, 8.72%
10. Maryland, 8.89%

Red denotes states won by Republicans. Blue denotes states won by Democrats.

== Alabama ==
Until 1968, Alabama governors were not allowed two successive terms. To circumvent this, Wallace used his wife Lurleen as his stand-in. She died in 1968.

== Alaska ==
Egan was defeated in 1966, but would be re-elected in 1970 (see 1970 United States gubernatorial elections).

== Arizona ==
Arizona operated on governors serving two-year terms until 1970, when Jack Richard Williams was the first governor to be elected to a four-year term. He had previously been elected governor for two two-year terms in 1966. and in 1968. Arizona made the switch official from two-year to four-year terms in 1968 with an amendment.

Arizona not only adopted a four-year term for governors starting in the general election of 1970, but also adopted a two consecutive term limit in 1992.

== Arkansas ==
Arkansas had two-year terms for governors until 1984, when they switched to four-year terms with Amendment 63.

Winthrop Rockefeller was elected the first Republican governor since Reconstruction. He became the first Republican governor of any former Confederate State since Alfred A. Taylor of Tennessee was defeated in 1922.

== California ==
Incumbent governor Pat Brown (Democrat) was defeated in his bid for a third term by future U.S. president Ronald Reagan (Republican).

== Florida ==
William Haydon Burns was elected in 1964 for a two-year term because Florida shifted their governors' races from presidential years to midterm years. Starting in 1966, Florida held their four-year gubernatorial races in midterm years.

Kirk was the first Republican governor in the 20th century.

In 1968, Florida adopted a new state constitution, and the governor now had the option to serve two four-year terms in a row.

== Georgia ==
Maddox was elected by the State Legislature, and Callaway was the first Republican nominee for governor since 1876.

== Oklahoma ==
During Henry Bellmon's first term (1963–1967), the Oklahoma Constitution was changed to allow its governor to serve consecutive terms. However, the rule change did not apply to Bellmon. Thus, he was not eligible to serve a second term. He later served another term, from 1987 to 1991.

== See also ==
- 1966 United States elections
  - 1966 United States Senate elections
  - 1966 United States House of Representatives elections
