= 1974 Colorado gubernatorial election =

- November 5, 1974
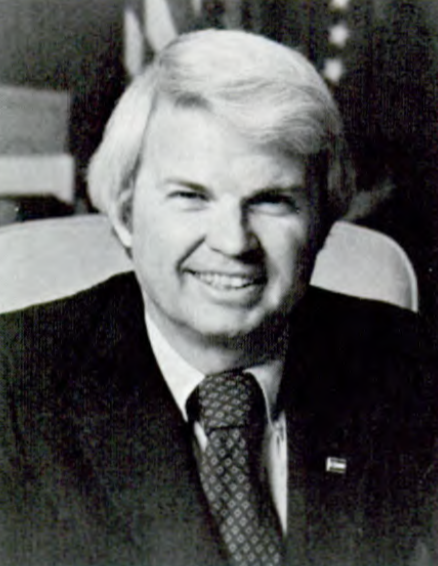

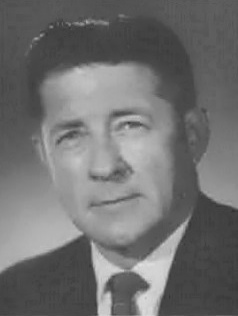
Nominee	Richard Lamm	John Vanderhoof
Party	Democratic	Republican
Running mate	George Brown	Ted Strickland
Popular vote	441,199	378,907
Percentage	53.22%	45.71%
- County results Lamm: 40–50% 50–60% 60–70% 70–80% Vanderhoof: 40–50% 50–60% 60–70%
Governor before election
John Vanderhoof
Republican
Elected Governor
Richard Lamm
Democratic

The 1974 Colorado gubernatorial election was held on November 5, 1974. Democratic nominee Richard Lamm defeated incumbent Republican John D. Vanderhoof with 53.22% of the vote. This is the last time that an incumbent governor of Colorado lost re-election.

== Primary elections ==
Primary elections were held on September 10, 1974.

=== Democratic primary ===
==== Candidates ====
- Thomas T. Farley, state representative from Pueblo
- Richard Lamm, state representative from Denver

==== Results ====
Democratic primary results
Party	Candidate	Votes	%
Democratic	Richard Lamm	120,452	58.69
Democratic	Thomas T. Farley	84,796	41.31
Total votes		205,248	100.00

=== Republican primary ===
==== Candidates ====
- Bill Daniels, businessman
- John Vanderhoof, incumbent governor

==== Results ====
Republican primary results
Party	Candidate	Votes	%
Republican	John Vanderhoof (incumbent)	94,334	60.46
Republican	Bill Daniels	61,691	39.54
Total votes		156,025	100.00

== General election ==
=== Candidates ===
Major party candidates

- Richard Lamm, Democratic
- John D. Vanderhoof, Republican

Other candidates

- Earl F. Dodge Jr., Prohibition
- Lann Meyers, U.S. Labor

=== Results ===
1974 Colorado gubernatorial election
Party	Candidate	Votes	%	±%
Democratic	Richard Lamm	441,199	53.22%	+7.98%
Republican	John D. Vanderhoof (incumbent)	378,907	45.71%	−6.75%
Prohibition	Earl F. Dodge Jr.	6,419	0.77%	
U.S. Labor	Lann Meyers	2,307	0.28%	
Majority		62,292	7.51%	
Turnout		828,968		
Democratic gain from Republican		Swing		
