= William McNichols =

William McNichols may refer to:

- William H. McNichols Jr., mayor of Denver, Colorado
- William Hart McNichols, American Catholic priest and artist
