= Thomas Farley =

Thomas or Tom Farley may refer to:

- Thomas T. Farley (1934–2010), American politician and lawyer
- Thomas W. Farley (born 1975), American banker and business executive
- Thomas Farley (physician), former commissioner of the New York City Department of Health and Mental Hygiene
- Tom Farley, Australian actor who appeared in the TV series Whiplash in 1960
- Lawrence Farley (1856–1910), known as Tom, American baseball player
