= Governor Gregg =

Governor Gregg may refer to:

- Hugh Gregg (1917–2003), 68th Governor of New Hampshire
- Judd Gregg (born 1947), his son and 76th Governor of New Hampshire
