= 1970 Colorado gubernatorial election =

- November 3, 1970
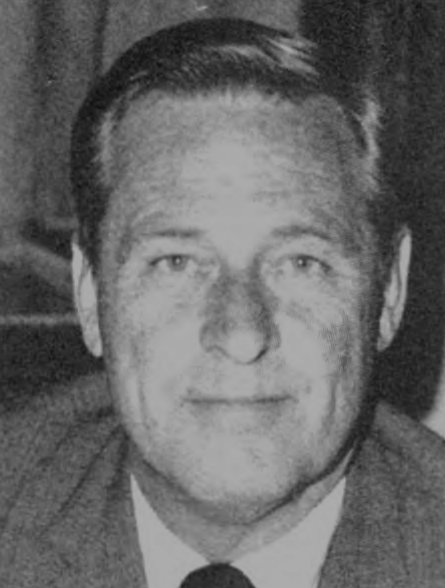

Nominee	John Arthur Love	Mark Anthony Hogan
Party	Republican	Democratic
Running mate	John Vanderhoof	Charles Grant
Popular vote	350,690	302,432
Percentage	52.46%	45.24%
- County results Love: 40–50% 50–60% 60–70% Hogan: 40–50% 50–60% 60–70%
Governor before election
John Arthur Love
Republican
Elected Governor
John Arthur Love
Republican

The 1970 Colorado gubernatorial election was held on November 3, 1970. Incumbent Republican John Arthur Love defeated Democratic nominee Mark Anthony Hogan with 52.46% of the vote. This would be the last time until 1998 that Colorado elected a Republican as Governor and also the last time Denver County, Boulder County, and San Miguel County voted for the Republican candidate.

== Primary elections ==
Primary elections were held on September 8, 1970.

=== Democratic primary ===
==== Candidates ====
- Mark Anthony Hogan, incumbent Lieutenant Governor

==== Results ====
Democratic primary results
Party	Candidate	Votes	%
Democratic	Mark Anthony Hogan	103,239	100.00

=== Republican primary ===
==== Candidates ====
- John Arthur Love, incumbent Governor

==== Results ====
Republican primary results
Party	Candidate	Votes	%
Republican	John Arthur Love (incumbent)	104,642	100.00

== General election ==
=== Candidates ===
Major party candidates

- John Arthur Love, Republican
- Mark Anthony Hogan, Democratic

Other candidates

- Albert Gurule, La Raza Unida
- Walter R. Plankinton, American Independent
- James Lauderdale, Socialist Workers

=== General overview ===
1970 Colorado gubernatorial election
Party	Candidate	Votes	%	±%
Republican	John Arthur Love (incumbent)	350,690	52.46%	−1.59%
Democratic	Mark Anthony Hogan	302,432	45.24%	+1.74%
Raza Unida	Albert Gurule	12,179	1.82%	N/A
American Independent	Walter R. Plankinton	2,052	0.31	N/A
Socialist Workers	James Lauderdale	1,143	0.17%	
Majority		48,258	7.22%	−3.33%
Turnout		668,496		
Republican hold		Swing		

=== Results by county ===
County results
County	John A. Love Republican		Mark Hogan Democratic		Albert L. Gurule Raza Unida		Walter R. Plankinton American Independent		James Lauderdale Socialist Workers		Total Votes
County	#	%	#	%	#	%	#	%	#	%	Total Votes
Adams	20,666	45.45%	23,475	51.63%	2,061	2.33%	279	0.39%	86	0.19%	45,467
Alamosa	1,909	54.57%	2,464	41.85%	209	3.12%	26	0.46%	0	0.00%	3,498
Arapahoe	30,329	63.19%	17,064	35.55%	433	0.90%	131	0.27%	43	0.09%	48,000
Archuleta	334	41.29%	456	56.37%	17	2.10%	2	0.25%	0	0.00%	809
Baca	1,006	54.38%	825	44.59%	3	0.16%	15	0.81%	1	0.05%	1,850
Bent	1,126	48.89%	1,124	48.81%	45	1.95%	6	0.26%	2	0.09%	2,303
Boulder	23,617	57.90%	16,299	39.96%	618	1.52%	121	0.30%	135	0.33%	40,790
Chaffee	1,583	48.50%	1,627	49.85%	41	1.26%	7	0.21%	6	0.18%	3,264
Cheyenne	643	55.24%	515	44.24%	1	0.09%	5	0.43%	0	0.00%	1,164
Clear Creek	971	55.90%	728	41.91%	26	1.50%	10	0.58%	2	0.12%	1,737
Conejos	1,242	51.05%	971	39.91%	214	8.80%	4	0.16%	2	0.08%	2,433
Costilla	457	34.46%	771	58.14%	82	6.18%	9	0.68%	7	0.53%	1,326
Crowley	657	46.90%	728	51.96%	14	1.00%	2	0.14%	0	0.00%	1,401
Custer	384	58.45%	272	41.40%	1	0.15%	0	0.00%	0	0.00%	657
Delta	2,511	49.13%	2,558	50.05%	9	0.18%	29	0.57%	4	0.08%	5,111
Dolores	285	44.88%	347	54.65%	1	0.16%	2	0.31%	0	0.00%	635
Douglas	1,872	62.84%	1,072	35.99%	7	0.23%	27	0.91%	1	0.03%	2,979
Eagle	887	49.78%	864	48.48%	25	1.40%	4	0.22%	2	0.11%	1,782
El Paso	25,312	53.67%	21,254	45.07%	309	0.66%	226	0.48%	60	0.13%	47,161
Elbert	730	52.44%	654	46.98%	7	0.50%	1	0.07%	0	0.00%	1,392
Fremont	3,524	45.81%	4,113	53.46%	27	0.35%	26	0.34%	3	0.04%	7,693
Garfield	2,398	48.62%	2,519	51.07%	5	0.10%	10	0.20%	0	0.00%	4,932
Gilpin	360	55.13%	281	43.03%	6	0.92%	6	0.92%	0	0.00%	653
Grand	977	64.66%	530	35.08%	1	0.07%	2	0.13%	1	0.07%	1,511
Gunnison	1,075	52.98%	938	46.23%	9	0.44%	6	0.30%	1	0.05%	2,029
Hinsdale	107	64.46%	59	35.54%	0	0.00%	0	0.00%	0	0.00%	166
Huerfano	963	33.55%	1,749	60.94%	150	5.23%	6	0.21%	2	0.07%	2,870
Jackson	398	59.23%	274	40.77%	0	0.00%	0	0.00%	0	0.00%	672
Jefferson	46,003	61.87%	27,370	36.81%	747	1.00%	195	0.26%	34	0.05%	74,349
Kiowa	572	53.16%	500	46.47%	1	0.09%	3	0.28%	0	0.00%	1,076
Kit Carson	1,463	55.95%	1,139	43.56%	9	0.34%	4	0.15%	0	0.00%	2,615
La Plata	3,558	55.20%	2,777	43.08%	69	1.07%	36	0.56%	6	0.09%	6,446
Lake	773	33.67%	1,480	64.46%	28	1.22%	11	0.48%	4	0.17%	2,296
Larimer	14,133	61.06%	8,674	37.48%	255	1.10%	50	0.22%	33	0.14%	23,145
Las Animas	2,602	38.89%	3,785	56.57%	284	4.24%	11	0.16%	9	0.13%	6,691
Lincoln	1,092	52.25%	992	47.46%	6	0.29%	0	0.00%	0	0.00%	2,090
Logan	3,269	51.23%	3,082	48.30%	16	0.25%	8	0.13%	6	0.09%	6,381
Mesa	8,411	47.07%	9,277	51.92%	74	0.41%	76	0.43%	30	0.17%	17,868
Mineral	156	50.65%	148	48.05%	3	0.97%	1	0.32%	0	0.00%	308
Moffat	1,297	54.50%	1,072	45.04%	8	0.34%	2	0.08%	1	0.04%	2,380
Montezuma	1,944	49.97%	1,920	49.36%	10	0.26%	11	0.28%	5	0.13%	3,890
Montrose	2,652	48.48%	2,694	49.25%	60	1.10%	39	0.71%	25	0.46%	5,470
Morgan	3,403	56.57%	2,592	43.09%	11	0.18%	6	0.10%	4	0.07%	6,016
Otero	3,718	50.90%	3,460	47.36%	101	1.38%	17	0.23%	9	0.12%	7,305
Ouray	314	51.64%	290	47.70%	1	0.16%	3	0.49%	0	0.00%	608
Park	570	55.99%	438	43.03%	2	0.20%	8	0.79%	0	0.00%	1,018
Phillips	914	47.88%	990	51.86%	4	0.21%	1	0.05%	0	0.00%	1,909
Pitkin	1,378	49.84%	1,307	47.27%	53	1.92%	17	0.61%	10	0.36%	2,765
Prowers	2,379	52.85%	2,078	46.17%	35	0.78%	8	0.18%	1	0.02%	4,501
Pueblo	13,130	33.46%	24,478	62.38%	1,412	3.60%	127	0.32%	91	0.23%	39,238
Rio Blanco	871	54.88%	698	43.98%	2	0.13%	15	0.95%	1	0.06%	1,587
Rio Grande	2,091	60.50%	1,257	36.37%	98	2.84%	7	0.20%	3	0.09%	3,456
Routt	1,389	49.22%	1,425	50.50%	4	0.14%	3	0.11%	1	0.04%	2,822
Saguache	732	51.22%	643	45.00%	53	3.71%	1	0.07%	0	0.00%	1,429
San Juan	172	45.03%	204	53.40%	3	0.79%	3	0.79%	0	0.00%	382
San Miguel	393	50.32%	386	49.42%	2	0.26%	0	0.00%	0	0.00%	781
Sedgwick	819	54.38%	673	44.69%	13	0.86%	1	0.07%	0	0.00%	1,506
Summit	479	54.81%	388	44.39%	6	0.69%	1	0.11%	0	0.00%	874
Teller	639	50.43%	621	49.01%	2	0.16%	5	0.39%	0	0.00%	1,267
Washington	1,200	53.05%	1,047	46.29%	4	0.18%	10	0.44%	1	0.04%	2,262
Weld	13,757	57.09%	9,841	40.84%	373	1.55%	74	0.31%	53	0.22%	24,098
Yuma	1,783	52.44%	1,610	47.35%	1	0.03%	6	0.18%	0	0.00%	3,400
Totals	350,690	52.46%	302,432	45.24%	12,179	1.82%	2,052	0.31%	1,143	0.17%	668,496
