= Palmer Burch =

American politician

47th Treasurer of Colorado
- In office January 12, 1971 – January 14, 1975
- Governor: John Arthur Love; John D. Vanderhoof
- Preceded by: Julia Swearingen
- Succeeded by: Sam Brown

Member of the Colorado House of Representatives from the 17th district
- In office January 6, 1965 – January 6, 1971
- Preceded by: Multi-member district
- Succeeded by: Multi-member district

Member of the Colorado House of Representatives from the Denver district
- In office January 4, 1961 – January 6, 1965
- Preceded by: Multi-member district
- Succeeded by: Multi-member district
- In office January 3, 1951 – January 7, 1959
- Preceded by: Multi-member district
- Succeeded by: Multi-member district
- In office January 8, 1947 – January 5, 1949
- Preceded by: Multi-member district
- Succeeded by: Multi-member district

Personal details
- Born: March 7, 1907 Ordway, Colorado, U.S.
- Died: June 28, 1990 (aged 83) Denver, Colorado, U.S.
- Party: Republican

Palmer Burch (March 7, 1907 – June 28, 1990) was an American politician who served as the Treasurer of Colorado from 1971 to 1975. He previously served in the Colorado House of Representatives from 1947 to 1949 and from 1951 to 1959 and from 1961 to 1971.

Party political offices
Preceded by Donald G. Brotzman	Republican nominee for Governor of Colorado; 1958	Succeeded by John Arthur Love
