= Knous =

Knous is a surname of German origin. Notable people with the surname include:

- Robert Lee Knous (1917–2000), American politician.
- William Lee Knous (1889–1959), American politician and judge.
