= Sam T. Taylor =

American politician

Samuel Tesitor Taylor

Member of the Colorado Senate from the 32nd district
- In office 1971–1974
- Succeeded by: Dan D. Noble

Member of the Colorado Senate from the 17th district
- In office 1967–1971
- Preceded by: Vincent Massari
- Succeeded by: Ted L. Strickland

Member of the Colorado Senate from the 32nd district
- In office 1965–1967

Member of the Colorado Senate from the 14th district
- In office 1934–1965
- Preceded by: Adolph Unfug
- Succeeded by: Ruth Stockton

Personal details
- Born: Samuel Tesitor Taylor; January 4, 1903 Hastings, Colorado, U.S.
- Died: March 23, 1977 (aged 74) Trinidad, Colorado
- Party: Democratic
- Spouse: Nina Taylor (née Luckenbaugh)
- Children: Sam, Jr.
- Profession: Attorney

Samuel Tesitor Taylor (January 4, 1903 – March 23, 1977) was a Democratic state senator from Colorado, U.S. He served in the state senate for 40 years, from 1934 to 1974. Born in Hastings, Colorado, the site of a former coal mine and now a ghost town, he later moved to Walsenburg, Colorado. Taylor worked as a coal miner and then earned a law degree at the University of Colorado before running for state senate. In Walsenburg, he worked as county attorney.

== Elections ==
Taylor first ran for state office in 1934, seeking to represent District 14 in the Colorado Senate. He won the Democratic primary and the general election and began serving in the state senate in 1934. He was re-elected in 1938, 1942, 1946, 1950, 1954, 1958, and 1962. In 1964, following redistricting, he represented senate district 32 from 1965 to 1966. In 1966, he was elected to represent senate district 17 and served from 1967 to 1971. In 1970, he was elected to represent senate district 32 and served from 1971 to 1974, when he retired. He is the longest-serving legislator in Colorado history.

In 1954, Taylor was a candidate for the office of Colorado Lieutenant Governor, but he was defeated by Frank L. Hays.

== Senate leadership positions ==
During his term in the senate, Taylor served as senate minority leader in 1953, from 1955 to 1956, and from 1963 to 1970. He served as senate majority Leader from 1957 to 1960. He served as senate president pro tem from 1961 to 1962, and he served as senate assistant minority leader from 1971 to 1972. As senate president pro tem, he often served as acting governor.

== Personal life and death ==
Sam Taylor married Nina Luckenbaugh in Boulder, Colorado on March 2, 1929. During World War II, Taylor served as a captain in the United States Military. Taylor died on March 23, 1977, aged 74, at Mt. San Rafael Hospital in Trinidad, Colorado, where he had been staying in a nursing home. He is buried at St. Mary North Cemetery in Walsenburg.
