= Allen Dines =

American politician (1921–2020)

Member of the Colorado House of Representatives
- In office 1957–1966

Member of the Colorado State Senate
- In office 1966–1974

Speaker of the Colorado House of Representatives
- In office 1965–1966
- Preceded by: John D. Vanderhoof
- Succeeded by: John D. Vanderhoof

Personal details
- Born: November 20, 1921 Denver, Colorado, U.S.
- Died: December 17, 2020 (aged 99) Pennsylvania, U.S.
- Party: Democratic
- Spouse: Audrey Kay (m.1945)
- Education: Yale University, Harvard University
- Profession: lawyer

Allen Dines (November 20, 1921 – December 17, 2020) was an American politician in the state of Colorado. He was a member of the Colorado House of Representatives from 1957 to 1966, and the Colorado Senate from 1966 to 1974. From 1965 to 1966, Dines served as Speaker of the Colorado House of Representatives after previously serving as House Majority Leader from 1961 to 1962, and Minority Leader from 1963 to 1964.

Dines was born in Denver and attended Yale University and Harvard Law School where he attained a law degree. From 1943 to 1946, he served in World War II with the United States Naval Reserve in the Caribbean and Pacific theatres. He later practiced law in Denver.

He died on December 17, 2020, at the age of 99, in an in-home hospice.
