= 1978 Colorado gubernatorial election =

- November 7, 1978
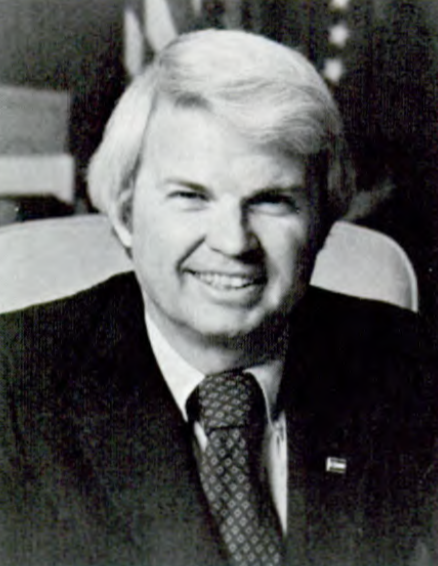

Nominee	Richard Lamm	Ted L. Strickland
Party	Democratic	Republican
Running mate	Nancy Dick	Hank Brown
Popular vote	483,985	317,292
Percentage	58.76%	38.53%
- County results Lamm: 40–50% 50–60% 60–70% 70–80% Strickland: 40–50% 50–60%
Governor before election
Richard Lamm
Democratic
Elected Governor
Richard Lamm
Democratic

The 1978 Colorado gubernatorial election was held on November 7, 1978. Incumbent Democrat Richard Lamm defeated Republican nominee Ted L. Strickland with 58.76% of the vote.

== Primary elections ==
Primary elections were held on September 12, 1978.

=== Democratic primary ===
==== Candidates ====
- Richard Lamm, incumbent Governor

==== Results ====
Democratic primary results
Party	Candidate	Votes	%
Democratic	Richard Lamm (incumbent)	94,292	100.00

=== Republican primary ===
==== Candidates ====
- Ted L. Strickland, State Senator
- Richard H. Plock Jr., State Senator

==== Results ====
Republican primary results
Party	Candidate	Votes	%
Republican	Ted L. Strickland	87,248	59.01
Republican	Richard H. Plock Jr.	60,597	40.99
Total votes		147,845	100.00

== General election ==
=== Candidates ===
Major party candidates

- Richard Lamm, Democratic
- Ted L. Strickland, Republican

Other candidates

- Roy Peister, Independent
- Elsa Blum, Socialist Workers
- Sal A. Mander, Independent
- Earl F. Dodge Jr., National Statesman

=== Results ===
1978 Colorado gubernatorial election
Party	Candidate	Votes	%	±%
Democratic	Richard Lamm (incumbent)	483,985	58.76%	+5.54%
Republican	Ted L. Strickland	317,292	38.53%	−5.18%
Independent	Roy Peister	13,990	1.70%	
Socialist Workers	Elsa Blum	3,690	0.45%	
Independent	Sal A. Mander	2,452	0.30%	N/A
Prohibition	Earl Dodge	2,198	0.27%	−0.50%
Majority		166,693	20.23%	+12.72%
Turnout		823,807		
Democratic hold		Swing		
