= 1960 New Hampshire gubernatorial election =

- November 8, 1960
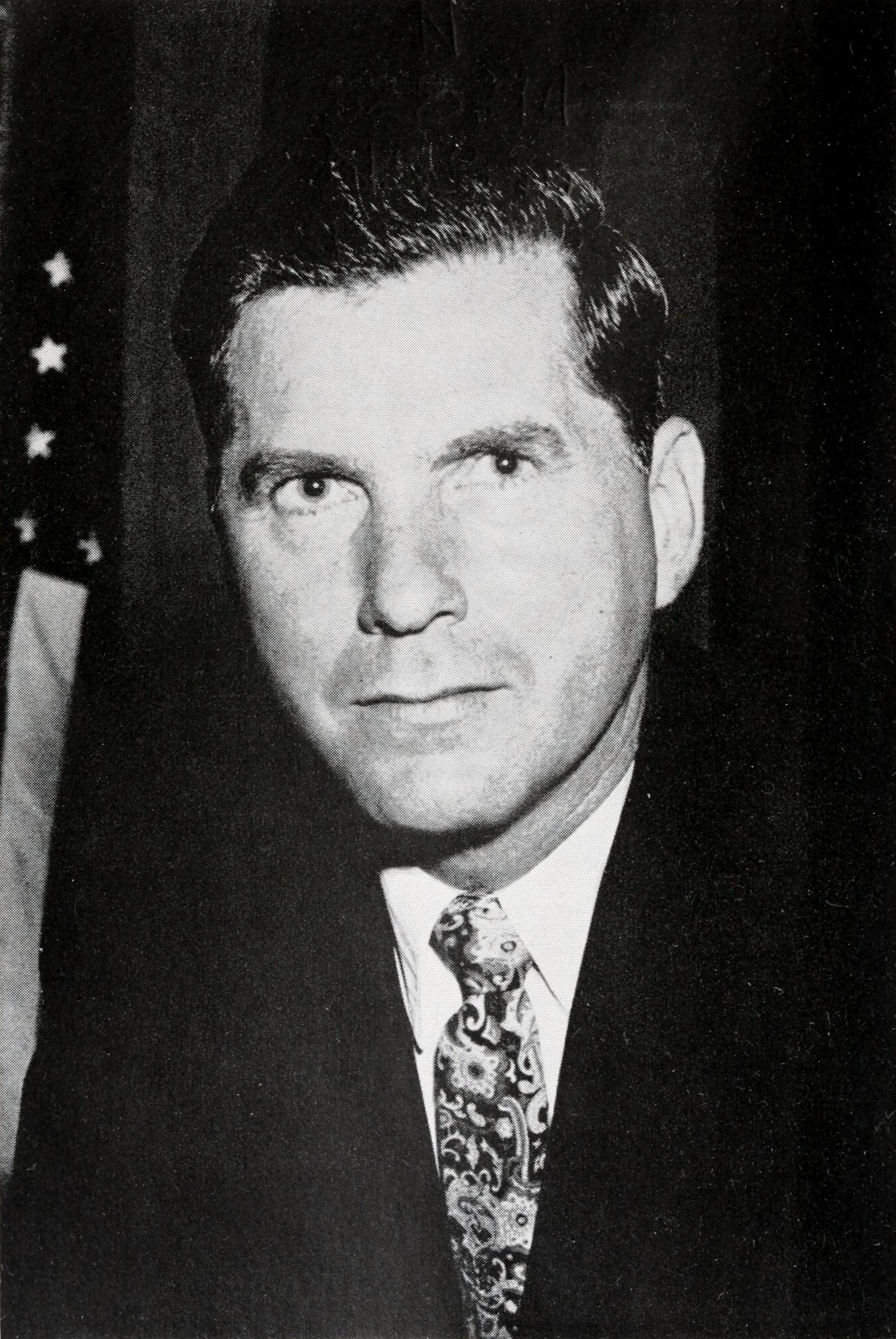

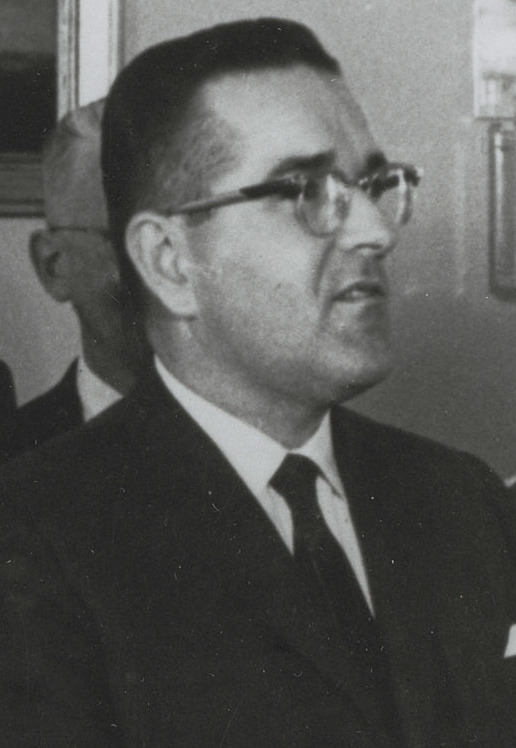
Nominee	Wesley Powell	Bernard L. Boutin
Party	Republican	Democratic
Popular vote	161,123	129,404
Percentage	55.46%	44.54%
- Powell: 50–60% 60–70% 70–80% 80–90% >90% Boutin: 50–60% 60–70% 70–80%
Governor before election
Wesley Powell
Republican
Elected Governor
Wesley Powell
Republican

The 1960 New Hampshire gubernatorial election was held on November 8, 1960. Incumbent Republican Wesley Powell defeated Democratic nominee Bernard L. Boutin with 55.46% of the vote.

== Primary elections ==
Primary elections were held on September 13, 1960.

=== Candidates ===
- Bernard L. Boutin, former Mayor of Laconia
- John Shaw
- Robert W. Watson

=== Results ===
Democratic primary results
Party	Candidate	Votes	%
Democratic	Bernard L. Boutin	31,650	77.59
Democratic	John Shaw	7,151	17.53
Democratic	Robert W. Watson	1,990	4.88
Total votes		40,791	100.00

=== Republican primary ===
==== Candidates ====
- Wesley Powell, incumbent Governor
- Hugh Gregg, former Governor
- Wayne Crosby

==== Results ====
Republican primary results
Party	Candidate	Votes	%
Republican	Wesley Powell (incumbent)	49,119	49.86
Republican	Hugh Gregg	48,108	48.83
Republican	Wayne Crosby	1,286	1.31
Total votes		98,513	100.00

== General election ==
=== Candidates ===
- Wesley Powell, Republican
- Bernard L. Boutin, Democratic

=== Results ===
1960 New Hampshire gubernatorial election
Party	Candidate	Votes	%	±%
Republican	Wesley Powell (incumbent)	161,123	55.46%	
Democratic	Bernard L. Boutin	129,404	44.54%	
Majority		31,719		
Turnout		290,527		
Republican hold		Swing		
