= Mark Anthony Hogan =

American politician

37th Lieutenant Governor of Colorado
- In office January 10, 1967 – January 12, 1971
- Governor: John A. Love
- Preceded by: Robert Lee Knous
- Succeeded by: John Vanderhoof

Personal details
- Born: January 27, 1931 Chicago, Illinois, U.S.
- Died: February 12, 2017 (aged 86) Denver, Colorado, U.S.
- Party: Democratic

Mark Anthony Hogan (January 27, 1931 – February 12, 2017) was the 37th lieutenant governor of Colorado. He was a Democrat and served from 1967 to 1971 under Republican governor John Arthur Love.

Hogan graduated from Georgetown University in 1952 and served in the United States Navy from 1952 to 1954. He settled in Denver, Colorado and became a realtor. He served two terms in the state legislature.

In 1970, Hogan was the unsuccessful Democratic nominee for Governor of Colorado. He died in 2017.

Party political offices
Preceded by Robert Lee Knous	Democratic nominee Governor of Colorado; 1970	Succeeded by Richard Lamm
Political offices
Preceded by Robert Lee Knous	Lieutenant Governor of Colorado; 1967–1971	Succeeded by John David Vanderhoof
