= 1964 New Hampshire gubernatorial election =

- November 3, 1964
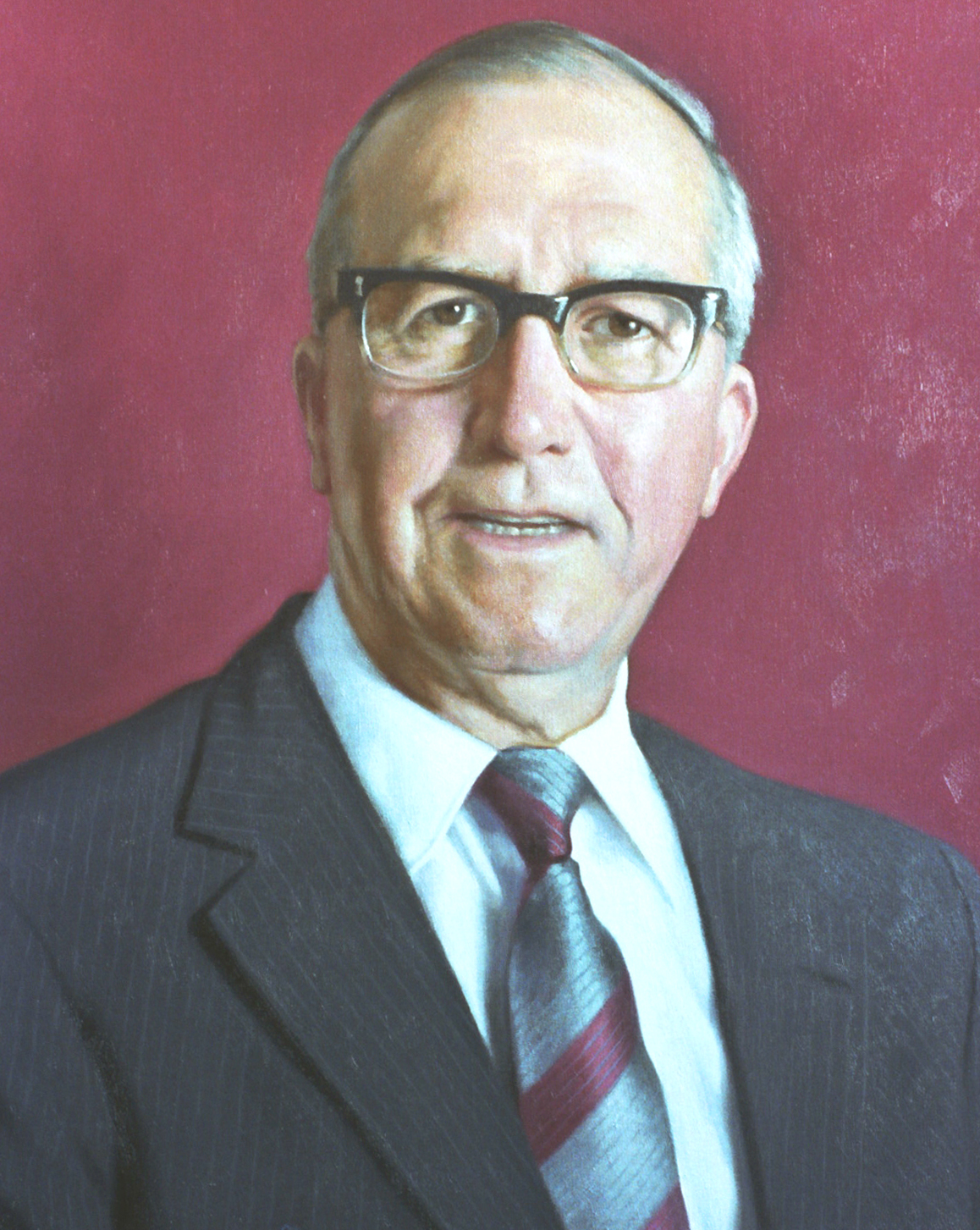

Nominee	John W. King	John Pillsbury
Party	Democratic	Republican
Popular vote	190,863	94,824
Percentage	66.77%	33.17%
- King: 40-50% 50–60% 60–70% 70–80% 80–90% Pillsbury: 40-50% 50–60% 60–70% 70–80% >90% Tie: 40-50%
Governor before election
John W. King
Democratic
Elected Governor
John W. King
Democratic

The 1964 New Hampshire gubernatorial election was held on November 3, 1964. Incumbent Democrat John W. King defeated Republican nominee John Pillsbury with 66.77% of the vote.

== Primary elections ==
Primary elections were held on September 8, 1964.

=== Republican primary ===
==== Candidates ====
- John Pillsbury
- Wesley Powell, former Governor
- John C. Mongan, Mayor of Manchester
- Albert Levitt
- Walter L. Koenig
- Elmer E. Bussey

==== Results ====
Republican primary results
Party	Candidate	Votes	%
Republican	John Pillsbury	32,200	51.38
Republican	Wesley Powell	21,764	34.73
Republican	John W. King (write-in)	3,608	5.76
Republican	John C. Mongan	3,532	5.64
Republican	Albert Levitt	846	1.35
Republican	Walter L. Koenig	450	0.72
Republican	Elmer E. Bussey	276	0.44
Total votes		62,676	100.00

== General election ==
=== Candidates ===
- John W. King, Democratic
- John Pillsbury, Republican

=== Results ===
1964 New Hampshire gubernatorial election
Party	Candidate	Votes	%	±%
Democratic	John W. King (incumbent)	190,863	66.77%	
Republican	John Pillsbury	94,824	33.17%	
Majority		96,039		
Turnout		285,863		
Democratic hold		Swing		
