= 1986 Colorado gubernatorial election =

- November 4, 1986
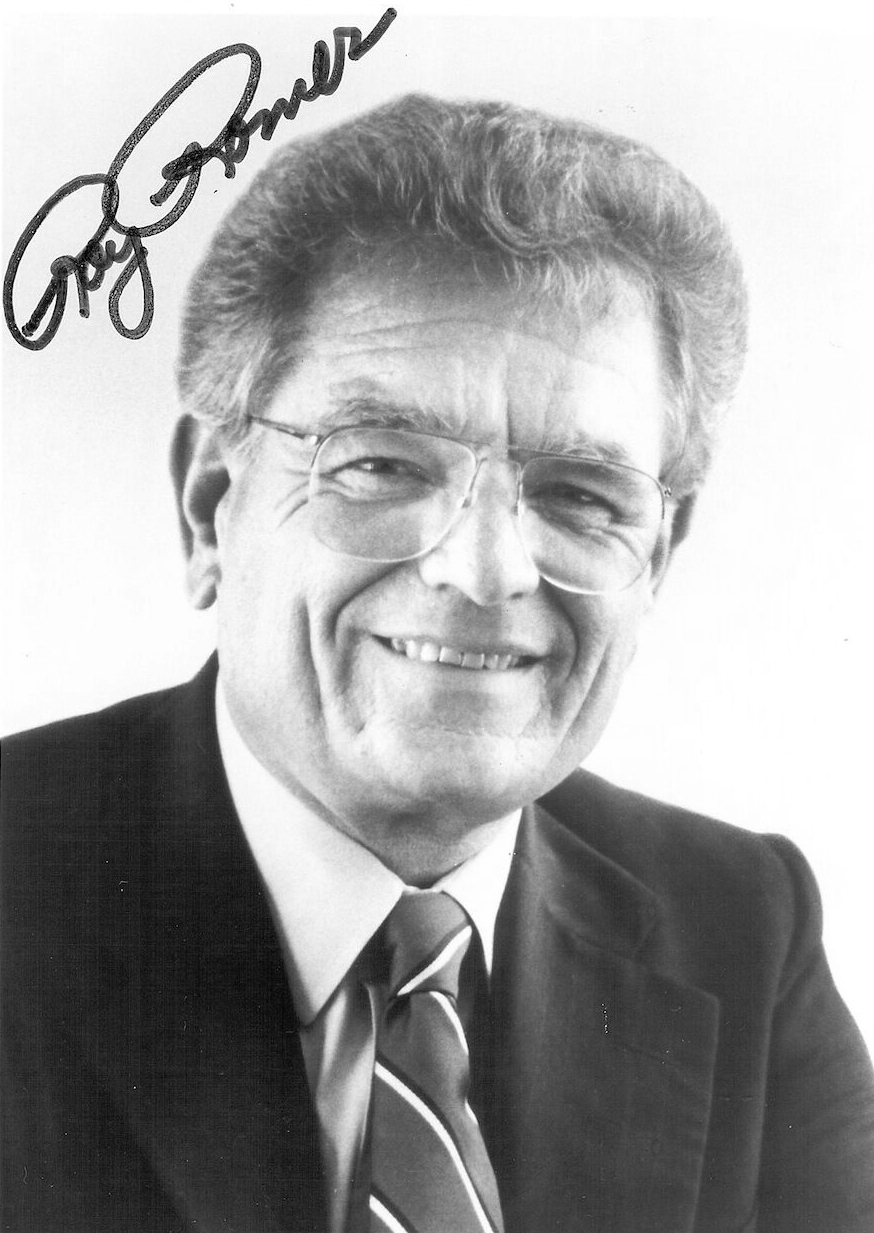

Nominee	Roy Romer	Ted L. Strickland
Party	Democratic	Republican
Running mate	Mike Callihan	Kathy Arnold
Popular vote	616,325	434,420
Percentage	58.20%	41.03%
- County results Romer: 40–50% 50–60% 60–70% 70–80% Strickland: 40–50% 50–60% 60–70%
Governor before election
Richard Lamm
Democratic
Elected Governor
Roy Romer
Democratic

The 1986 Colorado gubernatorial election was held on November 4, 1986. Democratic nominee Roy Romer defeated Republican nominee Ted L. Strickland with 58.20% of the vote.

== Primary elections ==
Primary elections were held on August 12, 1986.

=== Democratic primary ===
==== Candidates ====
- Roy Romer, Colorado State Treasurer

==== Results ====
Democratic primary results
Party	Candidate	Votes	%
Democratic	Roy Romer	101,192	100.00

=== Republican primary ===
==== Candidates ====
- Ted L. Strickland, State Senator, and former Lieutenant Governor
- Steve Schuck, businessman
- Bob Kirscht, State Representative

==== Results ====
Republican primary results
Party	Candidate	Votes	%
Republican	Ted L. Strickland	66,796	35.56
Republican	Steve Schuck	64,245	34.21
Republican	Bob Kirscht	56,779	30.23
Total votes		187,820	100.00

== General election ==
=== Candidates ===
Major party candidates

- Roy Romer, Democratic
- Ted L. Strickland, Republican

Other candidates

- Earl F. Dodge Jr., Prohibition

=== Results ===
1986 Colorado gubernatorial election
Party	Candidate	Votes	%	±%
Democratic	Roy Romer	616,325	58.20%	−7.49%
Republican	Ted L. Strickland	434,420	41.03%	+9.36%
Prohibition	Earl Dodge	8,183	0.77%	+0.40%
Majority		181,905	17.17%	
Turnout		1,058,928		
Democratic hold		Swing		
