= William Hart McNichols =

The Reverend William Hart McNichols
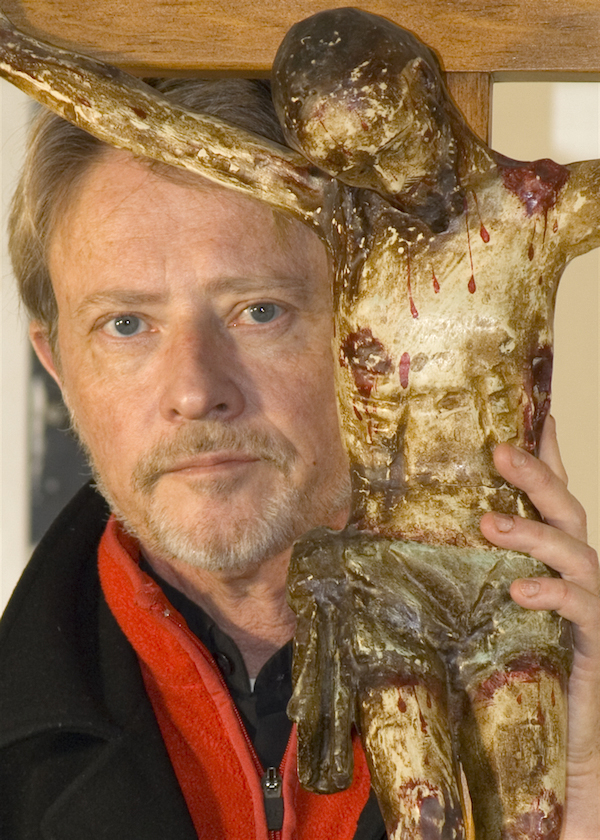
- Born: July 10, 1949 (age 77); Denver, Colorado
- Education: Regis High School, St. Louis University, Boston College, Boston University, Weston School of Theology, Pratt Institute
- Occupations: Catholic Priest, Artist, Iconographer
- Years active: 1979–present
- Website: https://william-hart-mcnichols.pixels.com/

William Hart McNichols (born July 10, 1949) is an American Catholic priest and artist from the United States. He was formerly a member of the Society of Jesus.

== Early life ==
McNichols was born to Marjory Hart and Stephen L. R. McNichols on July 10, 1949, at St. Joseph's Hospital in Denver, Colorado.

McNichols's childhood was dominated by American politics and religion. His grandfather was city auditor for 30 years and, by 2nd grade his father was elected as Colorado's 35th governor. His uncle, William H. McNichols Jr., was mayor of Denver for 14 years. The family lived at the Cheesman-Boettcher Mansion in downtown Denver. As an 11-year-old child, McNichols attended the 1960 Democratic National Convention in Los Angeles, California.

== Education ==
McNichols went to Christ the King and St. John the Evangelist Catholic schools before attending Regis High School in Denver, Colorado. After attending Colorado State University for one year, he entered the Society of Jesus (the Jesuits) in 1968 and studied philosophy, theology, and art at California College of the Arts, St. Louis University, Boston College, and Boston University.

He taught art at Boston College High School for 1 year and then founded the art department at Denver's Regis High School. He taught art and theology there for 3 years. McNichols received a Masters of Divinity from Weston School of Theology in Cambridge, Massachusetts, and a Master of Fine Arts from Pratt Institute in Brooklyn, New York. He was ordained in 1979 as a Catholic priest by Archbishop James Casey in Denver, CO.

== Draft card refusal ==
In 1971, McNichols was a member of a group of 27 Jesuit seminarians who denounced the Selective Service System in a joint statement. In solidarity with other young men being drafted, they publicly turned in their draft cards stating they would no longer accept their 4-D exemptions as ministerial students. Each Jesuit knew they were risking being drafted. They had been inspired by Robert Drinan, a Catholic priest turned Congressman, who was elected on a platform opposing the war, as well as fellow Jesuit activist, writer, and poet Daniel Berrigan.

The consequence of his actions led McNichols to be reclassified as 1A, thus becoming eligible for the draft. However, when the draft lottery occurred he drew a high number, 284, which made the possibility of him being drafted very low.

== AIDS hospice work ==
Early in his ministry, McNichols celebrated a healing mass for those with HIV and AIDS. As the causes of HIV were unknown at the time, there was a great deal of fear among those without it. In the planning, it was decided not to allow worshipers to drink from the communal chalice, but to instead dip the host into the consecrated wine. This required the Eucharistic ministers to place the hosts into the mouths of communicants, thus risking touching their tongues and saliva. The first healing mass was so well received that it became a weekly event.

From 1983 to 1990, McNichols worked as a chaplain with the AIDS hospice team of St. Vincent's Hospital in Manhattan, New York. On All Souls Day, he takes the lists of those to whom he ministered and places them on the altar during mass. He was praised by John Cardinal O'Connor for his ministry to AIDS patients. The stress of the work began to take a physical toll on McNichols and he was asked by his superiors to take a step back.

During this time he also illustrated 20 books, mostly children's books for Paulist Press. He got permission from the Jesuits to speak out publicly regarding the AIDS crisis. He spoke to numerous television news outlets including ABC World News as well writing an essay entitled A Priest Forever for a book Homosexuality in the Priesthood and the Religious Life edited by Sister Jeannine Gramick.

In his book Stations of the Cross for a Person with AIDS, he featured drawings of the hands of Christ during the stations of the cross and included real life stories of AIDS experiences. The book's introduction was written by Archbishop of Seattle Raymond Hunthausen. Before leaving New York in 1990, McNichols published a book of poetry, Fire Above Water Below – Poetry for the Spiritual Children of St. Francis and St. Clare. The Spirituality of the AIDS period is further documented in the 1993 book "Aloysius" by Clifford Stevens and William Hart McNichols.

== Apprenticeship and first icon ==
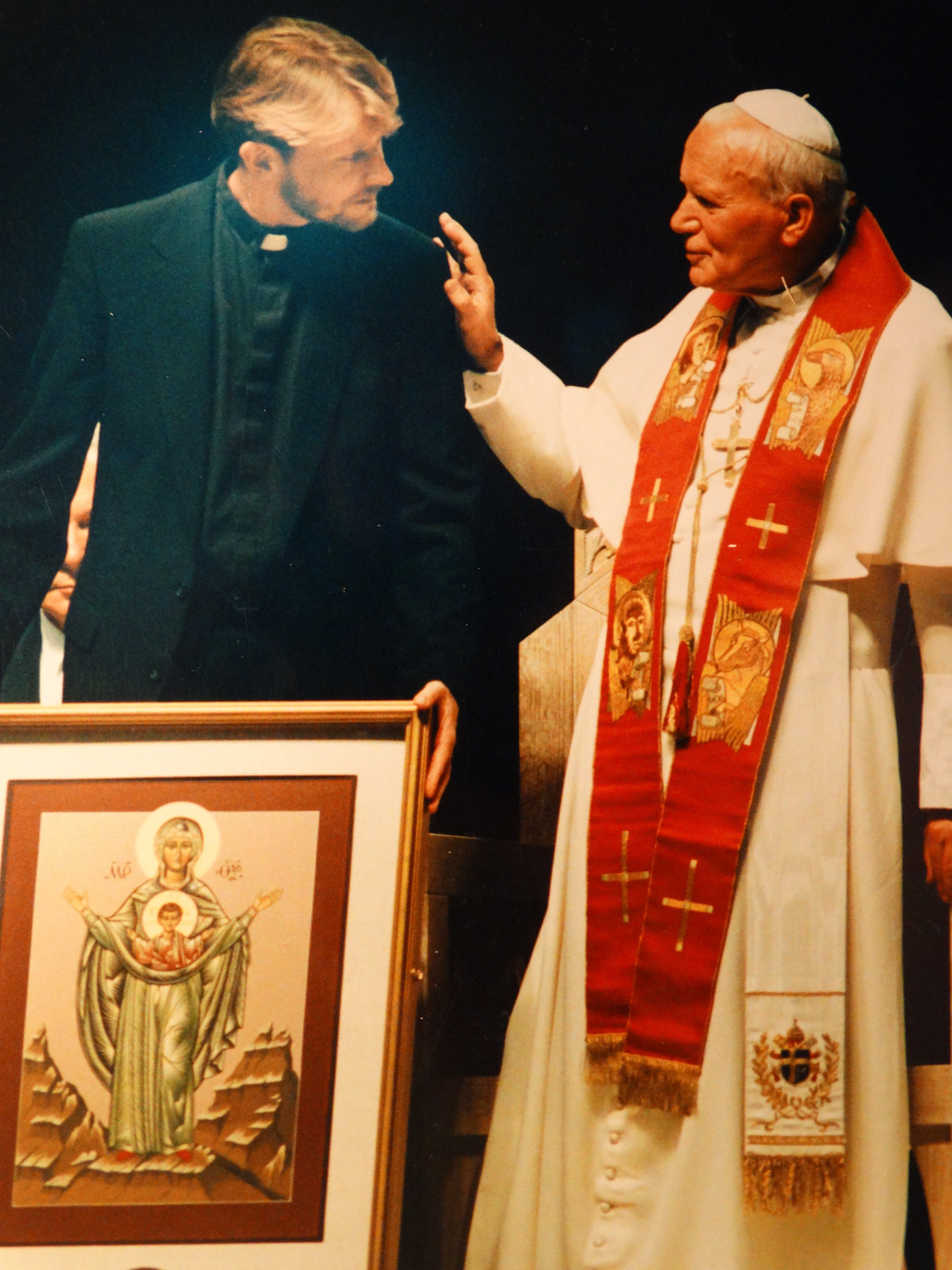
Father McNichols presents Our Lady of the New Advent: The Burning Bush to Pope John Paul II

In 1990, McNichols moved to Albuquerque, New Mexico, to study the technique, history, and spirituality of icon painting with Russian-American master Robert Lentz. In 1991, he was commissioned by Cardinal James Stafford to create an icon for Our Lady of the New Advent, an icon of the Blessed Mother under a title that would go on to give its name to a new Marian feast day as decreed by the Vatican, December 16. Later, in 1993, while Pope John Paul II was in Denver for World Youth Day, McNichols presented the Pope with a second icon of Our Lady of the New Advent: The Burning Bush. The icon now resides in the Vatican Museums.

== Time magazine and departure from Jesuits ==
In May 2002, just months after the Boston Globe broke the Catholic Church sexual abuse scandal, McNichols spoke out in an article in Time magazine, defending gay people who were being scapegoated by the scandal. The article states McNichols has been out as gay since 1983. "I felt I had to stand up for gay people and gay priests," he said. "It turned into a huge thing."

At the end of 2002, McNichols left the Jesuit order after 35 years but with permission from his archbishop remained active as a priest. He would remain at San Francisco de Asis Mission Church in Ranchos de Taos, New Mexico, for the next 14 years, continuing to paint commissions, completing hundreds of icons for churches and colleges around the world.

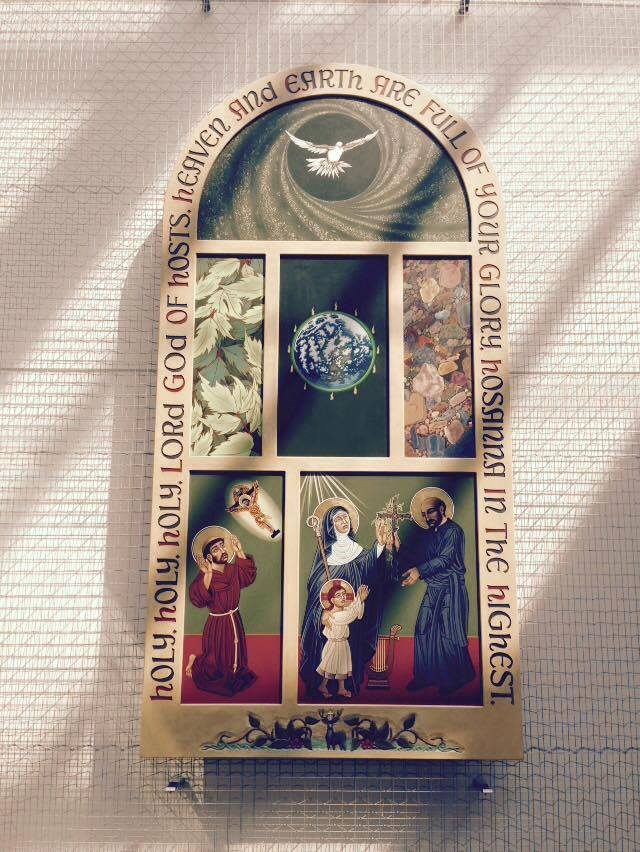
Viriditas

== Work as icon painter ==
McNichols has been heralded by Time magazine "as among the most famous creators of Christian Iconic imagery in the world." His icons have been described as encompassing an eclectic mix of Catholic saints and other spiritually symbolic individuals.

In September 2015, the Jesuits of Loyola University Chicago unveiled McNichols's largest icon to date. Viriditas: Finding God in All Things stands 5 feet by 10 feet in the Hank Center for Catholic Intellectual Heritage.

As of 2020, McNichols serves as a priest at St. Joseph on the Rio Grande, in Albuquerque, New Mexico.

== Film ==
In 2016 McNichols granted filmmaker Christopher Summa permission to produce an independent film on his life and art, The Boy Who Found Gold. The film focuses on McNichols's life as an iconographer and journeys deep into the prayers and stories behind his work.

McNichols had a small speaking role with Academy Award Winning actor J. K. Simmons in the 2003 film "Off The Map".

== Bibliography ==
McNichols has contributed numerous illustrations and poems to various Catholic magazines throughout his career. In addition, he has collaborated on books with Daniel Berrigan, John Dear, James A. Janda, Cardinal John J. Wright, Megan McKenna, and Mirabai Starr.

- Image to Insight: The Icons and Sacred Images of New Mexico Artist William Hart McNichols by John Dadosky (University of New Mexico Press, 2017)
- Bringing Forth Christ: Five Feasts of the Child Jesus by St. Bonaventure, Andre Cirino, OFM, Josef Raischl, OFS and Eric Doyle, OFM Icons by William Hart McNichols (Tau Publishing, 2015)
- How Do You Pray?: Inspiring Responses from Religious Leaders, Spiritual Guides, Healers, Activists and Other Lovers of Humanity by Celeste Yacoboni (Monkfish Books, 2014) ISBN 978-1939681232
- The Virgin Martyrs by Michael J.K. Fuller cover art by William Hart McNichols (Liturgy Training Pub, 2011) ISBN 978-1595250223
- Mother of God Similar to Fire by Mirabai Starr and William Hart McNichols (Orbis Books, 2010) ISBN 978-1-57075-894-2
- You Will Be My Witnesses: Saints, Prophets, and Martyrs by John Dear S.J. and William Hart McNichols (Orbis Books, 2006) ISBN 978-1570756412
- The Healing Touch of Mary by Cheri Lamont (Divine Impressions, 2005) ISBN 978-0976716495
- Mary of Nazareth, Prophet of Peace by John Dear Icons by William Hart McNichols (Ave Maria Press, 2003) ISBN 978-0877939825
- Pilgrim's Companion to Franciscan Places by Franciscan Pilgrimage Programs Poetry contributed by William Hart McNichols (Editrice Minerva Assissi, 2002) ISBN 978-8887021530
- Christ All Merciful by Megan McKenna and William Hart McNichols (Orbis Books, 2002) ISBN 978-1570754494
- The Bride: Images of the Church by Daniel Berrigan and William Hart McNichols (Orbis Books, 2000) ISBN 978-1570753053
- Mary, Mother of All Nations by Megan McKenna and William Hart McNichols (Orbis Books, 2000) ISBN 978-1570753251
- And The Risen Bread by Daniel Berrigan cover art by William Hart McNichols (Fordham University Press, 1998)
- Minor Prophets Major Themes by Daniel Berrigan cover art by William Hart McNichols (Rose Hill Books, 1995)
- Aloysius by Clifford Stevens and William Hart McNichols (Our Sunday Visitor, 1993) ISBN 978-0879735289
- The Fifteen Mysteries: In Image and Word by M. Basil Pennington and William Hart McNichols (Our Sunday Visitor, 1993) ISBN 978-0879734992
- An Advent Novena with Our Lady of the New Advent by William Hart McNichols (1993) ASIN: B010REORH0
- Queen of Prophets: The Gospel Message of Medjugorje by Dudley Plunkett cover art William Hart McNichols (1993) ISBN 978-0385421522
- Wildman, Warriors and Kings: Masculine Spirituality and the Bible by Patrick Arnold cover art by William Hart McNichols (Crossroad, 1991)
- Whereon To Stand: The Acts of the Apostles and Ourselves by Daniel Berrigan cover art by William Hart McNichols (Fortkamp Publishing, 1991)
- Fire Above / Water Below Poetry for the Spiritual Children of St. Francis and St. Clare by William Hart McNichols (1990)
- In Embrace: Poems for Meditation and Retreat by J. Janda cover art by William Hart McNichols (1990)
- Feliz Navidad, Pablo by Teri Martini and William Hart McNichols (Paulist Press, 1990) ISBN 978-0809165971
- An Epistle of Comfort by William Josef Dobbels, SJ Illustrations by William Hart McNichols (Sheed & Ward, 1990) ISBN 978-1556123641
- Homosexuality in the Priesthood and the Religious Life by Jeannine Gramick (Crossroads Publishing, 1989) ISBN 978-0824509637
- Stations of the Cross for a Person with AIDS (Archdiocese of Seattle 1989)
- The Story of Our Lady of Guadalupe: Three People, Four Days, Many Miracles by J. Janda Illustrations by William Hart McNichols (Paulist Press, 1988) ISBN 978-0809165735
- Appointments with the Little King by J. Janda Illustrations by William Hart McNichols (Paulist Press, 1988) ISBN 978-0809129324
- Legend of the Holy Child of Atocha by J. Janda Illustrations by William Hart McNichols (Paulist Press, 1988) ISBN 978-1576465530
- The Legend of St. Christopher by J. Janda Illustrations by William Hart McNichols (Paulist Press, 1987) ISBN 978-0809165698
- Through the Loneliness: A Woman's Spiritual Journal by Antonia J. Van De Beld Illustrations by William Hart McNichols (Paulist Press, 1987) ISBN 978-0809129133
- Present for Jessica by Teddi Doleski Illustrations by William Hart McNichols (Paulist Press, 1986)
- Words in Pain by Cardinal John J. Wright Illustrations by William Hart McNichols (Ignatius Press, 1986) ISBN 978-0898700701
- Encounters at Bethlehem by Jean Jones Andersen Illustrations by William Hart McNichols (Paulist Press, 1985) ISBN 0-8091-2719-9
- Julian: A Play Based on the Life of Julian of Norwich by J. Janda Illustration and Tapestry design by William Hart McNichols (1984) ISBN 978-0816426324
- The People's Christmas by Gerald O'Collins, SJ Illustrations by William Hart McNichols (Paulist Press, 1984) ISBN 978-0809126606
- Finding Jesus – Living Through Lent with John's Gospel by Gerald O'Collins, SJ Illustrations by William Hart McNichols (Paulist Press, 1983) ISBN 0-8091-2565-X
- The Hurt by Teddi Doleski and William Hart McNichols (Paulist Press, 1983) ISBN 978-0809165513
- Anyone Can Pray: A Guide to Methods of Christian Prayer by Graeme Davidson and Mary MacDonald Illustrations by William Hart McNichols (Paulist Press, 1983)
- The Cathedral Book by Maureen Gallagher and William Hart McNichols (Paulist Press, 1982) ISBN 978-0809124855
- Hanbelachia by J. Janda cover art by William Hart McNichols (The Blue Cloud Quarterly, 1978)
- Nobody Stop By To See (Christian Poetry in Black Dialect) by J. Janda frontispiece by William Hart McNichols (Paulist Press, 1977)
- Documents of the 31st and 32nd General Congregations of the Society of Jesus by the Jesuits cover art by William Hart McNichols (Institute of Jesuit Sources, 1977) ISBN 978-0912422251
