= 1952 New Hampshire gubernatorial election =

- November 4, 1952
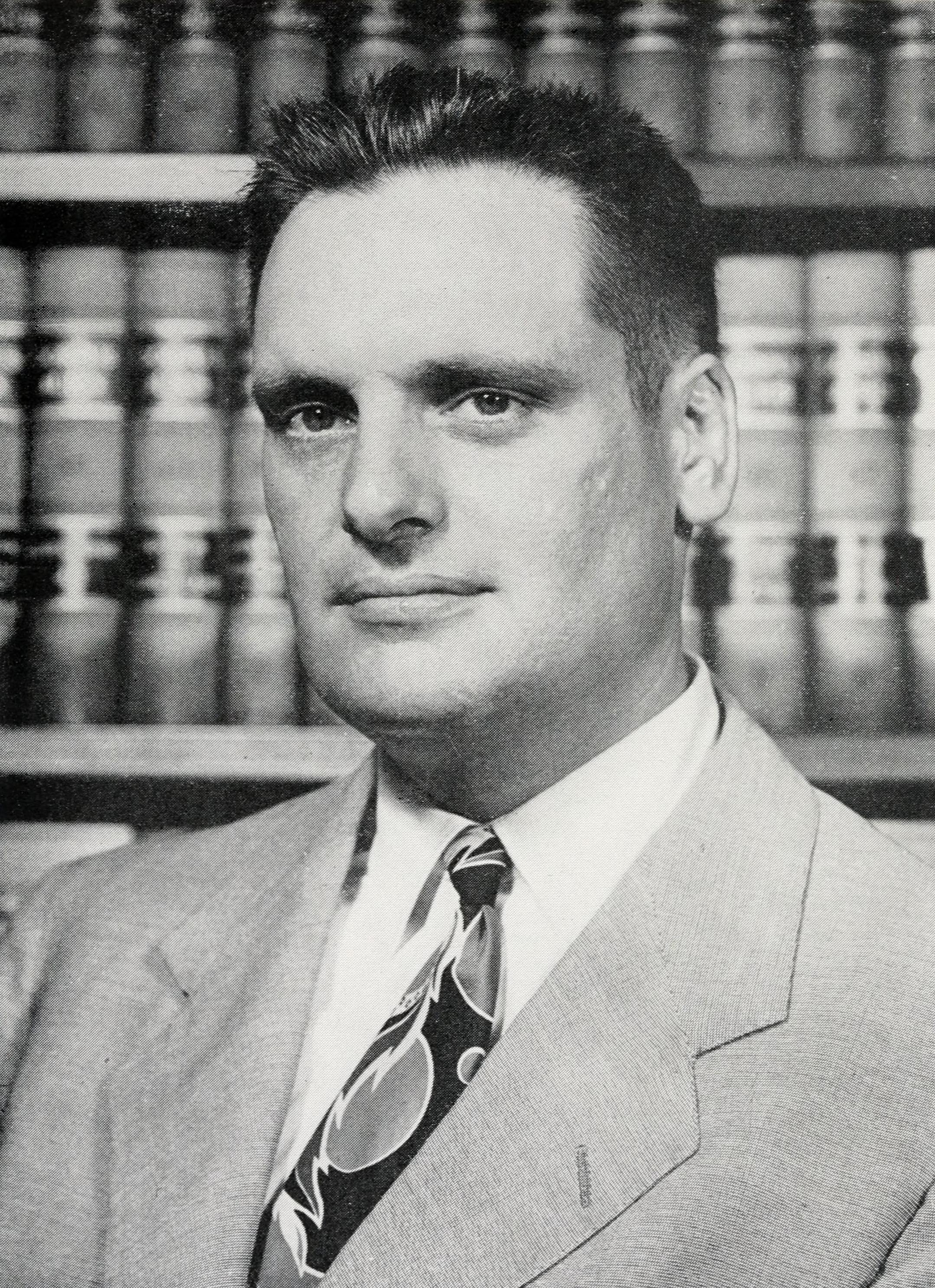

Nominee	Hugh Gregg	William H. Craig
Party	Republican	Democratic
Popular vote	167,791	97,924
Percentage	63.15%	36.85%
- Gregg: 50–60% 60–70% 70–80% 80–90% >90% Craig: 50–60% 60–70% 70–80%
Governor before election
Sherman Adams
Republican
Elected Governor
Hugh Gregg
Republican

The 1952 New Hampshire gubernatorial election was held on November 4, 1952. Republican nominee Hugh Gregg defeated Democratic nominee William H. Craig with 63.15% of the vote.

== Primary elections ==
Primary elections were held on September 9, 1952.

=== Republican primary ===
==== Candidates ====
- Hugh Gregg, former Mayor of Nashua
- Charles F. Stafford, member of the Executive Council of New Hampshire
- Robert O. Blood, former Governor
- Elmer E. Bussey

==== Results ====
Republican primary results
Party	Candidate	Votes	%
Republican	Hugh Gregg	50,741	63.52
Republican	Charles F. Stafford	15,697	19.65
Republican	Robert O. Blood	13,100	16.40
Republican	Elmer E. Bussey	341	0.43
Total votes		79,879	100.00

== General election ==
=== Candidates ===
- Hugh Gregg, Republican
- William H. Craig, Democratic

=== Results ===
1952 New Hampshire gubernatorial election
Party	Candidate	Votes	%	±%
Republican	Hugh Gregg	167,791	63.15%	
Democratic	William H. Craig	97,924	36.85%	
Majority		69,867		
Turnout		265,715		
Republican hold		Swing		
