= 1968 United States Senate election in Colorado =

- November 5, 1968
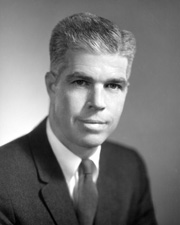

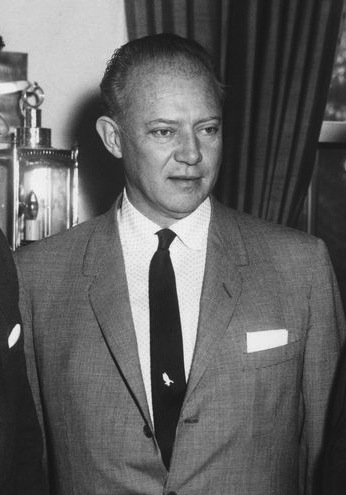
Nominee	Peter Dominick	Stephen McNichols
Party	Republican	Democratic
Popular vote	459,952	325,584
Percentage	58.55%	41.45%
- County results Dominick: 50–60% 60–70% 70–80% McNichols: 50–60% 60–70%
U.S. senator before election
Peter Dominick
Republican
Elected U.S. Senator
Peter Dominick
Republican

The 1968 United States Senate election in Colorado took place on November 5, 1968. Incumbent Republican U.S. Senator Peter Dominick was re-elected to a second term in office over Democratic ex-Governor Stephen McNichols. Peter Dominick defeated Stephen McNichols in a landslide despite Richard Nixon, a fellow Republican to Peter Dominick, winning the state by a somewhat smaller margin over Hubert Humphrey in the concurrent presidential election.

This Senate seat would go on to vote Republican only once more since this election; in 1998, when former Democrat Ben Nighthorse Campbell won re-election in a landslide as a Republican.

== Democratic primary ==
=== Candidates ===
- Stephen McNichols, former Governor of Colorado
- Kenneth W. Monfort, businessman and State Representative from Greeley

=== Results ===
Democratic primary results
Party	Candidate	Votes	%
Democratic	Stephen McNichols	92,250	58.54%
Democratic	Kenneth W. Monfort	65,347	41.47%
Total votes		157,597	100.00%

== General election ==
=== Results ===
1968 United States Senate election in Colorado
Party	Candidate	Votes	%	±%
Republican	Peter Dominick (inc.)	459,952	58.55%	▲4.97
Democratic	Stephen McNichols	325,584	41.45%	▼4.13
Total votes		785,536	100.00%	
Republican hold		Swing		

== See also ==
- 1968 United States Senate elections
