= 1958 New Hampshire gubernatorial election =

- November 4, 1958
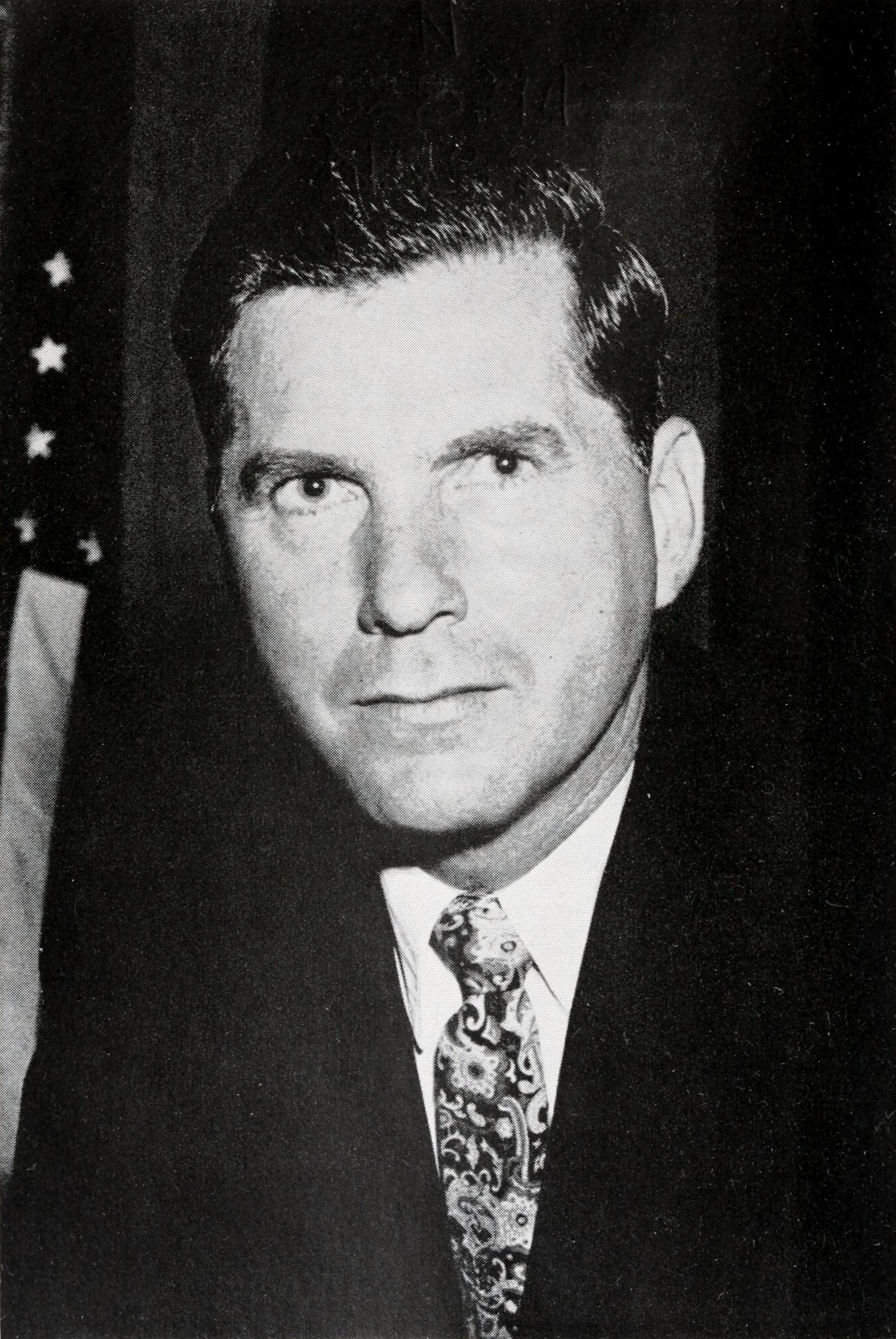

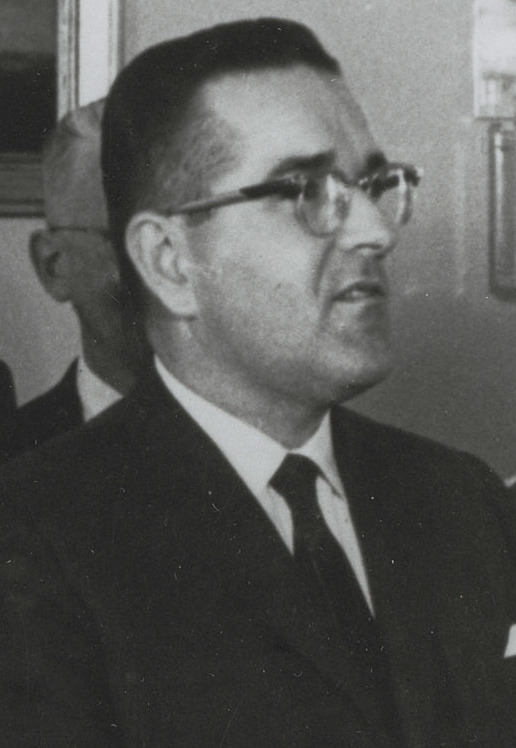
Nominee	Wesley Powell	Bernard L. Boutin
Party	Republican	Democratic
Popular vote	106,790	99,955
Percentage	51.65%	48.35%
- Powell: 50–60% 60–70% 70–80% 80–90% >90% Boutin: 50–60% 60–70% 70–80% 80–90% Tie: 50%
Governor before election
Lane Dwinell
Republican
Elected Governor
Wesley Powell
Republican

The 1958 New Hampshire gubernatorial election was held on Tuesday, November 4, to elect the Governor of New Hampshire, Republican candidate Wesley Powell defeated Democratic candidate and formar mayor of Laconia Bernard L. Boutin. with 51.65% of the vote.

== Primary elections ==
Primary elections were held on September 9, 1958.

=== Candidates ===
- Bernard L. Boutin, Mayor of Laconia
- John Shaw
- Alfred J. Champagne
- Albert R. Courtois

=== Results ===
Democratic primary results
Party	Candidate	Votes	%
Democratic	Bernard L. Boutin	16,646	47.04
Democratic	John Shaw	12,783	36.12
Democratic	Alfred J. Champagne	4,586	12.96
Democratic	Albert R. Courtois	1,376	3.89
Total votes		35,391	100.00

=== Republican primary ===
==== Candidates ====
- Wesley Powell, attorney
- Hugh Gregg, former Governor
- W. Douglas Scammon
- Eralsey C. Ferguson
- Elmer E. Bussey

==== Results ====
Republican primary results
Party	Candidate	Votes	%
Republican	Wesley Powell	39,761	47.54
Republican	Hugh Gregg	39,365	47.07
Republican	W. Douglas Scammon	3,096	3.70
Republican	Eralsey C. Ferguson	1,162	1.39
Republican	Elmer E. Bussey	256	0.31
Total votes		83,640	100.00

== General election ==
=== Candidates ===
- Wesley Powell, Republican
- Bernard L. Boutin, Democratic

=== Results ===
1958 New Hampshire gubernatorial election
Party	Candidate	Votes	%	±%
Republican	Wesley Powell	106,790	51.65%	
Democratic	Bernard L. Boutin	99,955	48.35%	
Majority		6,835		
Turnout		206,745		
Republican hold		Swing		
