= Bernard L. Boutin =

American politician

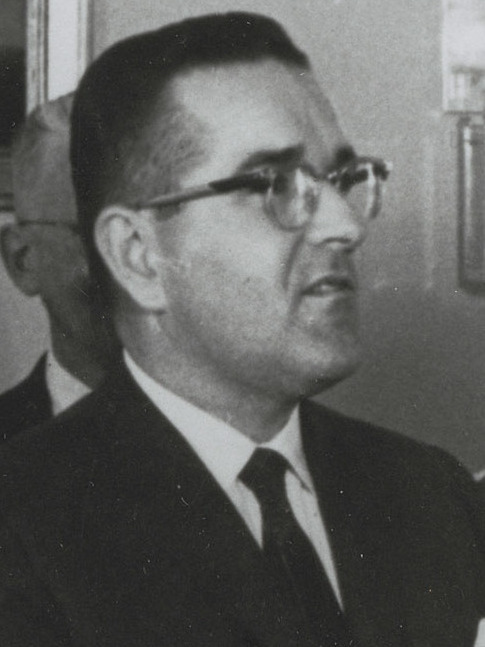

6th Administrator of the Small Business Administration
- In office May 19, 1966 – July 31, 1967
- President: Lyndon B. Johnson
- Preceded by: Eugene P. Foley
- Succeeded by: Robert C. Moot

Deputy Director of the Office of Economic Opportunity
- In office 1965–1966
- President: Lyndon B. Johnson

5th Administrator of the General Services Administration
- In office November 27, 1961 – November 30, 1964
- President: John F. Kennedy; Lyndon B. Johnson
- Preceded by: John Moore
- Succeeded by: Lawson B. Knott Jr.

Deputy Administrator of the General Services Administration
- In office January 1961 – November 1961
- President: John F. Kennedy

Mayor of Laconia
- In office 1955–1959
- Preceded by: Gerard L. Morin
- Succeeded by: J. Oliva Huot

Personal details
- Born: July 2, 1923 Belmont, New Hampshire, U.S.
- Died: August 24, 2011 (aged 88) Laconia, New Hampshire, U.S.
- Party: Democratic

Bernard L. Boutin (July 2, 1923 – August 24, 2011) was an American politician who served as Mayor of Laconia from 1955 to 1959, Administrator of the General Services Administration from 1961 to 1964 and as Administrator of the Small Business Administration from 1966 to 1967. He also served as the 11th president of Saint Michael's College, in Colchester, Vermont, from 1969 to 1974.

He died on August 24, 2011, in Laconia, New Hampshire, at age 88.

Party political offices
Preceded by John Shaw	Democratic nominee for Governor of New Hampshire; 1958, 1960	Succeeded by John W. King
