= Catherine Gregg =

First Lady of New Hampshire
- In role January 1, 1953 – January 6, 1955
- Governor: Hugh Gregg
- Preceded by: Rachel Adams
- Succeeded by: Elizabeth Cushman Dwinell

Personal details
- Born: Catherine Warner; August 15, 1917
- Died: August 1, 2014 (aged 96) Exeter, New Hampshire, U.S.
- Spouse: Hugh Gregg (-2003; his death)
- Education: Connecticut College (BA)
- Occupation: Philanthropist

Catherine Mitchell Gregg (August 15, 1917 – August 1, 2014) was an American philanthropist, environmentalist and historic preservationist. Gregg served as the First Lady of New Hampshire from 1953 until 1955 during the administration of her husband, former Governor Hugh Gregg. She was also the mother of another former Governor of New Hampshire, U.S. Representative, and U.S. Senator, Judd Gregg. An active philanthropist, Catherine Gregg led efforts to preserve and restore the Wentworth-Coolidge Mansion in Portsmouth, the last surviving, original colonial era Royal Governor's residence in the United States.

== Life and work ==
Gregg was born Catherine Warner on August 15, 1917, to Carden F. and Eliza (née Mitchell) Warner. She graduated from Connecticut College.

Gregg served on the Wentworth-Coolidge Commission and is credited with the restoration of Wentworth-Coolidge Mansion, the residency of the British royal governor of the Province of New Hampshire. The Wentworth-Coolidge Mansion, located in Portsmouth, is the last surviving original residence of a British Royal Governor in the United States. Additionally, Gregg served as the director of the Merrimack River Watershed Council. She also active with the New Hampshire Audubon Society, White Mountain Arts and Music Festival, and the Robert Frost Homestead.

Politically, Catherine Gregg campaigned to preserve New Hampshire's status as the first state to hold a presidential primary election.

Her husband, former Governor Hugh Gregg, died in 2003. Catherine Gregg died at her home at the RiverWoods in Exeter, New Hampshire, on August 1, 2014, at the age of 96. She was survived by two sons, Cy Gregg and former U.S. Senator Judd Gregg, five grandchildren, and seven great-grandchildren. The current Governor of New Hampshire, Maggie Hassan, ordered flags to be flown at half-staff in her honor.
