= 1958 Colorado gubernatorial election =

- November 4, 1958
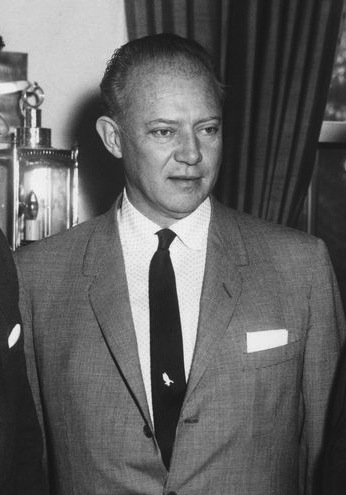

Nominee	Stephen McNichols	Palmer Burch
Party	Democratic	Republican
Popular vote	321,165	228,643
Percentage	58.41%	41.59%
- County results McNichols: 50–60% 60–70% 70–80% Burch: 50–60%
Governor before election
Stephen McNichols
Democratic
Elected Governor
Stephen McNichols
Democratic

The 1958 Colorado gubernatorial election was held on November 4, 1958. Incumbent Democrat Stephen McNichols defeated Republican nominee Palmer Burch with 58.41% of the vote.

In 1956, Colorado voters had approved Ballot Measure 1, extending the terms for state executive officers from two years to four years. Thus, McNichols became the first governor in the state's history elected to a four-year term.

== Primary elections ==
Primary elections were held on September 9, 1958.

=== Democratic primary ===
==== Candidates ====
- Stephen McNichols, incumbent Governor

==== Results ====
Democratic primary results
Party	Candidate	Votes	%
Democratic	Stephen McNichols (incumbent)	82,224	100.00

=== Republican primary ===
==== Candidates ====
- Palmer Burch, State Representative

==== Results ====
Republican primary results
Party	Candidate	Votes	%
Republican	Palmer Burch	53,279	100.00

== General election ==
=== Candidates ===
- Stephen McNichols, Democratic
- Palmer Burch, Republican

=== Results ===
1958 Colorado gubernatorial election
Party	Candidate	Votes	%	±%
Democratic	Stephen McNichols (incumbent)	321,165	58.41%	+7.07%
Republican	Palmer Burch	228,643	41.59%	−7.07%
Majority		92,522	16.82%	+14.14%
Turnout		549,808		
Democratic hold		Swing		
