= Stephen McNichols =

American politician

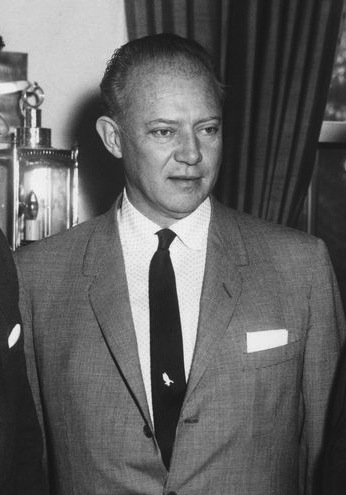

Chair of the National Governors Association
- In office June 26, 1960 – June 25, 1961
- Preceded by: J. Caleb Boggs
- Succeeded by: Wesley Powell

35th Governor of Colorado
- In office January 8, 1957 – January 8, 1963
- Lieutenant: Frank L. Hays; Robert Lee Knous
- Preceded by: Edwin C. Johnson
- Succeeded by: John Arthur Love

34th Lieutenant Governor of Colorado
- In office January 11, 1955 – January 8, 1957
- Governor: Edwin C. Johnson
- Preceded by: Gordon L. Allott
- Succeeded by: Frank L. Hays

Personal details
- Born: Stephen Lucid Robert McNichols; March 7, 1914 Denver, Colorado, U.S.
- Died: November 25, 1997 (aged 83) Denver, Colorado, U.S.
- Resting place: Mount Olivet Cemetery; Wheat Ridge, Colorado
- Party: Democratic
- Spouse: Majory Hart
- Children: 5
- Education: Regis University (BA); Catholic University (LLB)

Military service
- Allegiance: United States
- Branch/service: United States Coast Guard
- Battles/wars: World War II

Stephen Lucid Robert McNichols (March 7, 1914 – November 25, 1997) was an American politician who served as the 35th governor of Colorado from 1957 to 1963.

== Family roots and early life ==
McNichols's father, William H. McNichols, Denver's well-respected auditor for over thirty years, was influential in steering his two sons Bill and Stephen toward their success in state politics. Stephen McNichols graduated from East Denver High School and Regis College to pursue a law degree from Catholic University in Washington. After graduating in 1939, he joined the Federal Bureau of Investigation as a field officer in Baltimore and Boston. After a year of service, McNichols returned home to assist the Denver District Attorney, John A. Carroll. He later became an assistant in the U.S. Attorney General's antitrust division in Denver.

== Marriage and service in World War II ==
In 1942, McNichols married Marjory Hart. The couple had five children, Stephen, Robert, William, (Note: William went on to become a Jesuit priest, artist, and poet who ministered to those with AIDS.) Mary and Marjory. McNichols's family life as well as his municipal and judicial aspirations were put on hold, however, when the United States Coast Guard required his services as an officer in the amphibious corps in 1942. He distinguished himself in the service earning the Purple Heart, Bronze and Gold Stars and was promoted to lieutenant commander.

== Service in the Colorado State Senate ==
Less than ten years after receiving his law degree McNichols opened his own law firm McNichols, Dunn & Nevans and was elected to the state senate. As a senator McNichols soon became recognized as a skilled planner and was respected for his ability to cross party lines to achieve his goals. During his two terms he was instrumental in developing a plan for long-range highway development, a school district reorganization proposal, and a scheme to centralize public utility management.

== Lieutenant Governor of Colorado ==
McNichols's abilities to plan and pass legislation were rewarded in 1954 when he was elected as Edwin Johnson's lieutenant governor. When Governor Johnson was ill, which was much of the time during this administration, McNichols learned under this period the daily responsibilities of the governorship.

== Governor of Colorado ==
McNichols took over the responsibilities of governor when Edwin Johnson became ill and was unable to complete his term. It was this experience that helped McNichols to be elected Colorado's governor in 1956. The term was 2 years and McNichols was re-elected in 1958 and again in 1960.

Controversial activism and far-reaching plans distinguished McNichols's administration. As governor McNichols championed an improved system of school financial aid distribution and successfully lobbied for an increased university faculty salary cap. McNichols also advocated institutional reform for the State Hospital in Pueblo and State Penitentiary in Cañon City, both organizations fraught with corruption and aging structures. McNichols pushed public works projects securing federal funding for his long-range highway development program and seeing that the Fryingpan–Arkansas water development project was begun. He was also instrumental in the development of the Colorado State Archives and the governorship grew from a two to a four-year term during his administration.

To pass this tremendous package of legislation McNichols often alienated members of his own Democratic Party, and to pay for it he lobbied for an unpopular tax hike. Furthermore, McNichols's Fryingpan–Arkansas water diversion project caused friction between the Western Slope and Front Range regions. Another source of contention was McNichols's acceptance of the Executive Residence from the Boettcher Foundation. Many legislators disagreed with this decision and believed that it showed McNichols to be arrogant and power-hungry. Ironically, the same package of legislation that got him elected to the governorship in 1956 brought him defeat in his 1962 reelection campaign.

== Later life and death ==
McNichols's defeat at the polls continued with an unsuccessful bid for the U.S. Senate in 1968, serving as a Democratic National Committee member, or as the Rocky Mountain Regions U.S. Commerce Director in 1977.

His public service came to an end on November 25, 1997, when he died due to heart failure. Governor Roy Romer noted about McNichols, "I served in the state legislature during his tenure as governor and remember well his character, unique style and commitment to Colorado...He was one of our best governors, in an important time in our history."

== Notes ==
Political offices
Preceded by Gordon L. Allott	Lieutenant Governor of Colorado; 1955–1957	Succeeded by Frank L. Hays
Preceded by Edwin C. Johnson	Governor of Colorado; 1957–1963	Succeeded by John Arthur Love
Preceded by J. Caleb Boggs	Chair of the National Governors Association; 1960–1961	Succeeded by Wesley Powell
Party political offices
Preceded by Edwin C. Johnson	Democratic nominee for Governor of Colorado; 1956, 1958, 1962	Succeeded by Robert Lee Knous
Preceded by John A. Carroll	Democratic nominee for U.S. Senator from Colorado (Class 3); 1968	Succeeded by Gary Hart
