= 1966 New Hampshire gubernatorial election =

- November 8, 1966
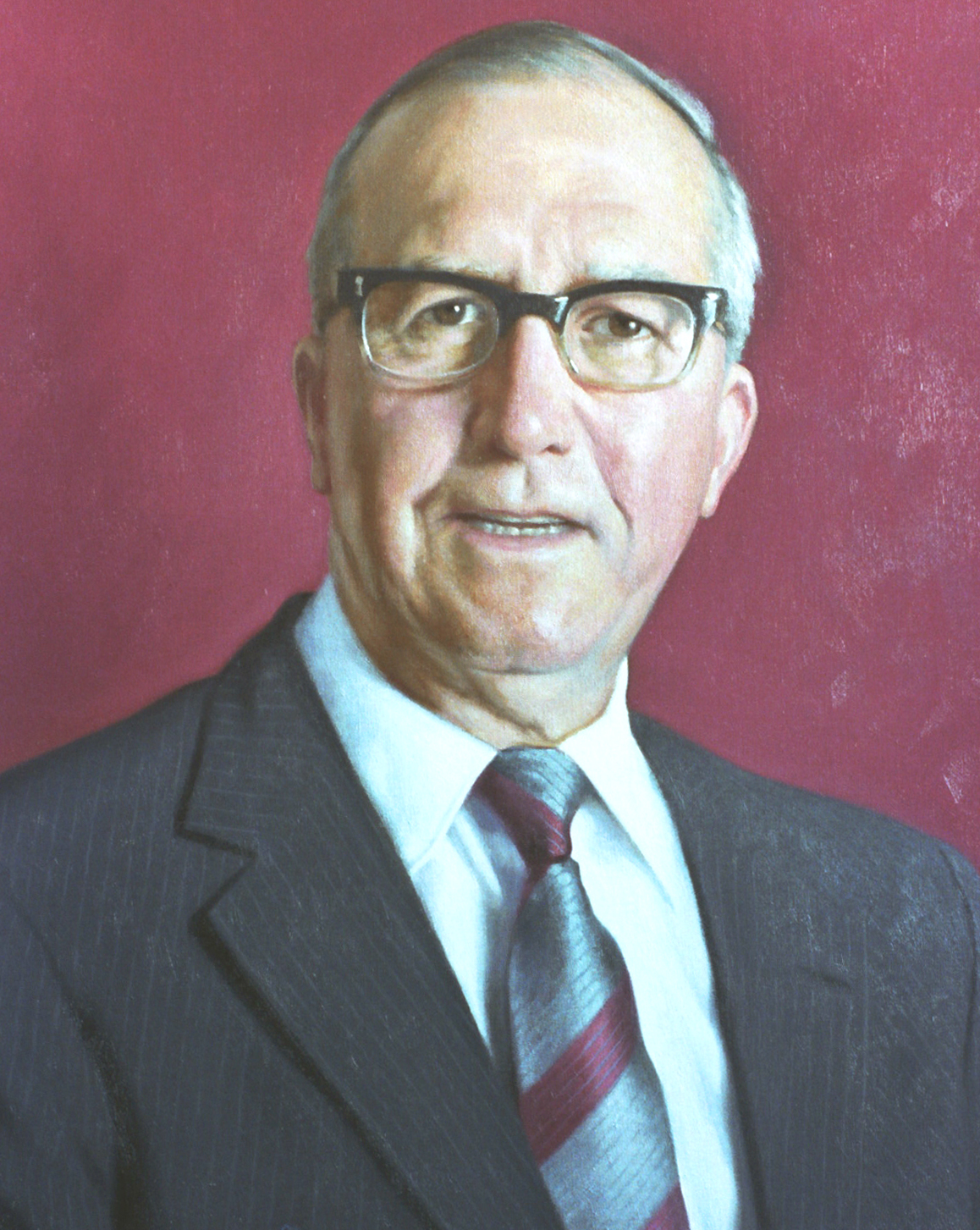

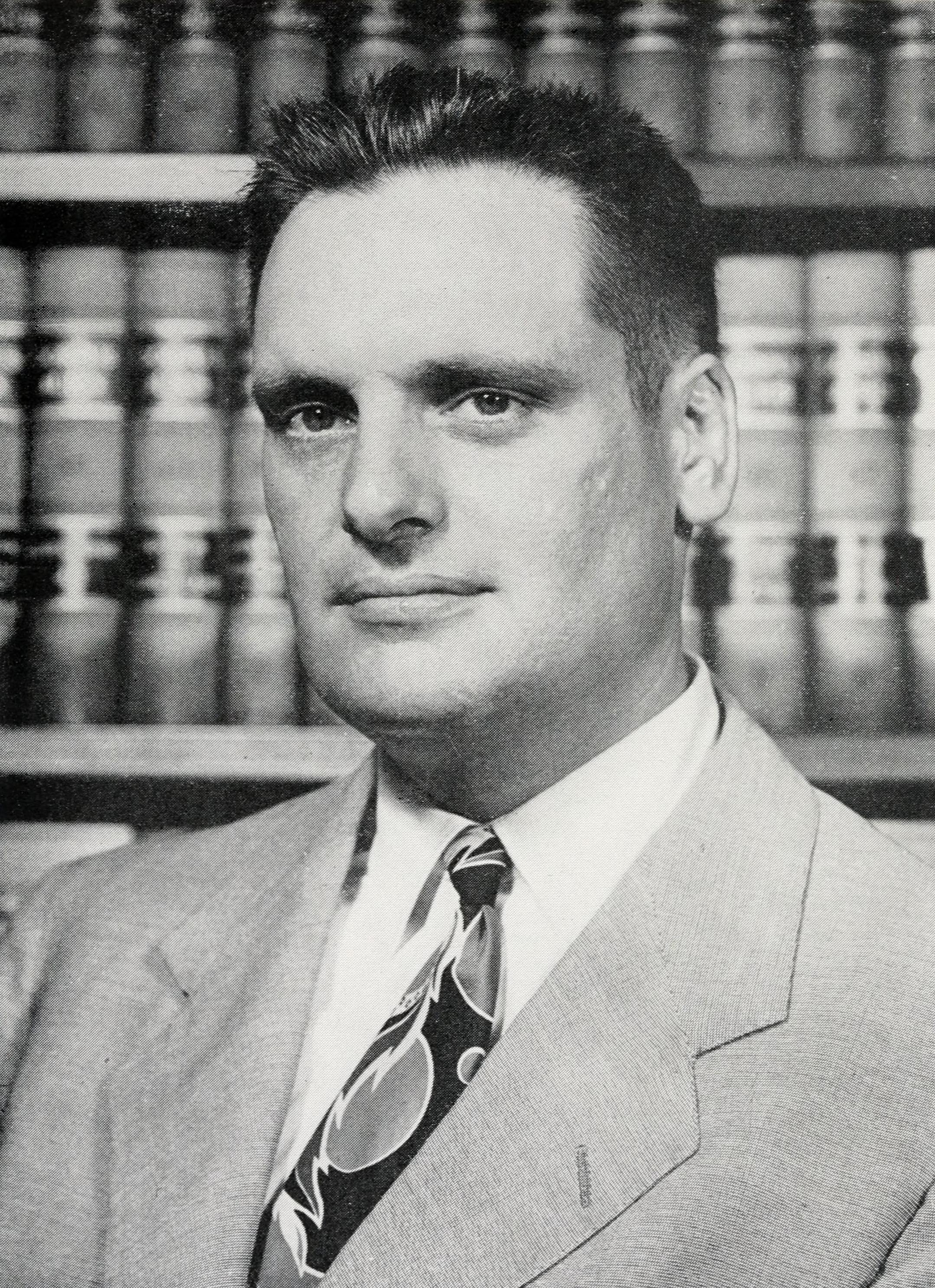
Nominee	John W. King	Hugh Gregg
Party	Democratic	Republican
Popular vote	125,882	107,259
Percentage	53.88%	45.91%
- King: 50–60% 60–70% 70–80% 80–90% Gregg: 50–60% 60–70% 70–80% 80–90% >90% Tie: 50%
Governor before election
John W. King
Democratic
Elected Governor
John W. King
Democratic

The 1966 New Hampshire gubernatorial election was held on November 8, 1966. Incumbent Democrat John W. King defeated Republican nominee Hugh Gregg with 53.88% of the vote.

== Primary elections ==
Primary elections were held on September 13, 1966.

=== Republican primary ===
==== Candidates ====
- Hugh Gregg, former Governor
- James J. Barry
- Alexander M. Taft
- William Maynard
- Peter R. Lessard
- Elmer E. Bussey

==== Results ====
Republican primary results
Party	Candidate	Votes	%
Republican	Hugh Gregg	33,946	44.88
Republican	James J. Barry	20,791	27.49
Republican	Alexander M. Taft	14,845	19.63
Republican	William Maynard	3,409	4.51
Republican	Peter R. Lessard	1,874	2.48
Republican	Elmer E. Bussey	654	0.87
Republican	John W. King (write-in)	125	0.17
Total votes		75,644	100.00

== General election ==
=== Candidates ===
- John W. King, Democratic
- Hugh Gregg, Republican

=== Results ===
1966 New Hampshire gubernatorial election
Party	Candidate	Votes	%	±%
Democratic	John W. King (incumbent)	125,882	53.88%	
Republican	Hugh Gregg	107,259	45.91%	
Independent	Alexander M. Taft (write-in)	461	0.20%	
Majority		18,623		
Turnout		233,642		
Democratic hold		Swing		
