= John A. Love =

American politician

John Love
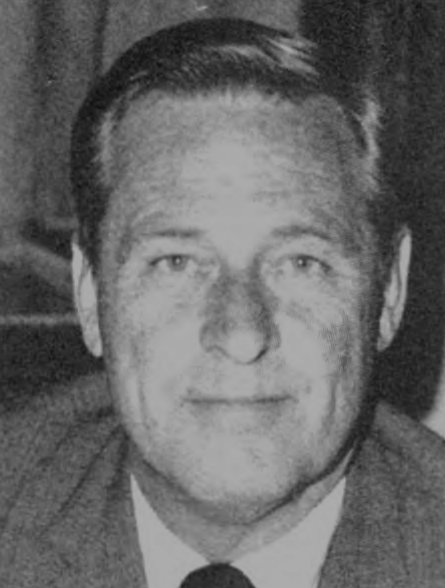

Director of the Energy Policy Office
- In office July 16, 1973 – December 4, 1973
- President: Richard Nixon
- Preceded by: Charles DiBona (National Energy Office)
- Succeeded by: William Simon (Federal Energy Office)

Chair of the National Governors Association
- In office August 31, 1969 – August 9, 1970
- Preceded by: Buford Ellington
- Succeeded by: Warren Hearnes

36th Governor of Colorado
- In office January 8, 1963 – July 16, 1973
- Lieutenant: Robert Knous; Mark Hogan; John Vanderhoof
- Preceded by: Stephen McNichols
- Succeeded by: John Vanderhoof

Personal details
- Born: John Arthur Love; November 29, 1916 near Gibson City, Illinois, U.S.
- Died: January 21, 2002 (aged 85) Aurora, Colorado, U.S.
- Party: Republican
- Spouse: Ann Daniels
- Children: 3, including Rebecca
- Education: University of Denver (BA, LLB)

Military service
- Allegiance: United States
- Branch/service: United States Navy
- Battles/wars: World War II
- Awards: Distinguished Flying Cross

John Arthur Love (November 29, 1916 – January 21, 2002) was an American attorney and Republican politician who served as the 36th governor of Colorado from 1963 to 1973.

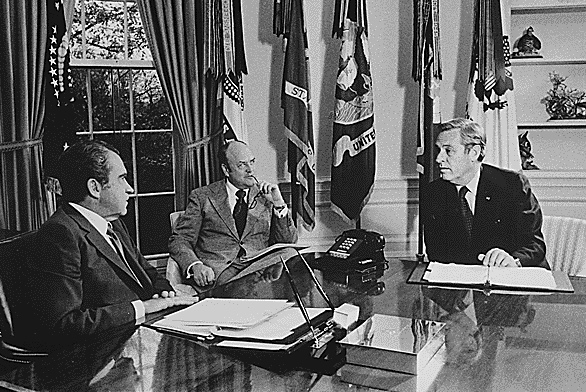
Left to right: President Richard Nixon, Secretary of Defense Melvin Laird, and John A. Love in the Oval Office, 1973.

== Early life and education ==
Love was born on a farm near Gibson City, Illinois, on November 29, 1916. At age five, he moved with his family to Colorado Springs, Colorado. He received a Bachelor of Arts degree from the University of Denver in 1938 and a Bachelor of Laws degree from the University of Denver School of Law in 1941.

He served as a U.S. Navy pilot in World War II for which he was twice awarded the Distinguished Flying Cross. After the war, Love started a law practice in Colorado Springs.

== Political career ==
In 1962, Love defeated incumbent Colorado Governor Stephen McNichols, a Democrat. Love was re-elected governor in 1966 and 1970. Regarded as a moderate, Love signed a bill legalizing abortion in 1967.

In 1973, Love resigned the governorship to become the nation's first Director of the Office of Energy Policy (nicknamed the "Energy Czar") in the administration of U.S. President Richard M. Nixon. Lieutenant Governor John D. Vanderhoof assumed the office of governor upon Love's resignation. After only five months as Energy Czar, Love resigned due to the political turmoil in the final days of the Nixon Administration. Historian Daniel Yergin asserts Love was forced to resign by Nixon in favor of William E. Simon due to the energy crisis created in October 1973 by the Arab oil embargo.

== Personal life ==
Love married Ann Daniels in 1942. They had three children: Dan, Andrew and Rebecca.

Love died of pulmonary failure on January 21, 2002, at the age of 85 in Aurora.

== See also ==
- Energy Czar

== Notes ==
Party political offices
Preceded by Palmer Burch	Republican nominee for Governor of Colorado; 1962, 1966, 1970	Succeeded by John Vanderhoof
Preceded by Robert Smylie	Chair of the Republican Governors Association; 1966–1967	Succeeded by John Chafee
Political offices
Preceded by Stephen McNichols	Governor of Colorado; 1963–1973	Succeeded by John Vanderhoof
Preceded by Buford Ellington	Chair of the National Governors Association; 1969–1970	Succeeded by Warren Hearnes
Preceded by Charles DiBona as Director of the National Energy Office	Director of the Energy Policy Office; 1973	Succeeded by William Simon as Director of the Federal Energy Office
