= Ted L. Strickland =

American politician

39th Lieutenant Governor of Colorado
- In office July 16, 1973 – January 14, 1975
- Governor: John D. Vanderhoof
- Preceded by: John D. Vanderhoof
- Succeeded by: George L. Brown

President of the National Conference of State Legislatures
- In office 1987–1988
- Preceded by: Irving J. Stolberg
- Succeeded by: Samuel B. Nunez Jr.

Personal details
- Born: Theodore Lawrence Strickland; September 17, 1932 Austin, Texas, U.S.
- Died: March 14, 2012 (aged 79) Brighton, Colorado, U.S.
- Party: Republican

Theodore Lawrence Strickland (September 17, 1932 – March 14, 2012) was an American politician who served as the 39th Lieutenant Governor of Colorado from 1973 to 1975 under Governor John D. Vanderhoof. Strickland served in both houses of the Colorado General Assembly and was President of the Colorado Senate.

In 1978 and 1986, Strickland was the unsuccessful Republican nominee for governor of Colorado. He lost in 1978 to Democratic incumbent Richard D. Lamm and in 1986 to Lamm's incoming successor, Roy R. Romer.

Party political offices
Preceded by John D. Vanderhoof	Republican nominee for Governor of Colorado; 1978	Succeeded by John Fuhr
Preceded by John Fuhr	Republican nominee for Governor of Colorado; 1986	Succeeded by John Andrews
Political offices
Preceded by John D. Vanderhoof	Lieutenant Governor of Colorado; July 1973 – January 1975	Succeeded by George L. Brown
