= 1962 Colorado gubernatorial election =

- November 6, 1962
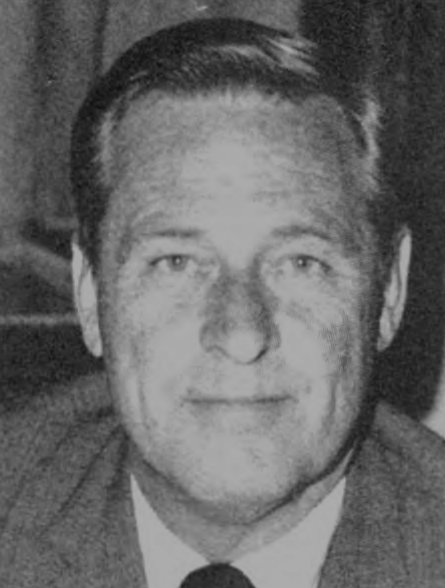

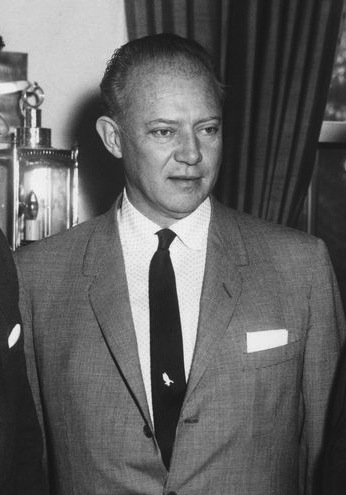
Nominee	John Arthur Love	Stephen McNichols
Party	Republican	Democratic
Popular vote	349,342	262,890
Percentage	56.67%	42.64%
- County results Love: 40–50% 50–60% 60–70% 70–80% McNichols: 50–60%
Governor before election
Stephen McNichols
Democratic
Elected Governor
John Arthur Love
Republican

The 1962 Colorado gubernatorial election was held on November 6, 1962. Republican nominee John Arthur Love defeated Democratic incumbent Stephen McNichols with 56.67% of the vote.

== Primary elections ==
Primary elections were held on September 11, 1962.

=== Democratic primary ===
==== Candidates ====
- Stephen McNichols, incumbent Governor

==== Results ====
Democratic primary results
Party	Candidate	Votes	%
Democratic	Stephen McNichols (incumbent)	69,435	100.00

=== Republican primary ===
==== Candidates ====
- John Arthur Love, former President of the Colorado Springs Chamber of Commerce
- David A. Hamil, former Speaker of the Colorado House of Representatives

==== Results ====
Republican primary results
Party	Candidate	Votes	%
Republican	John Arthur Love	66,027	59.63
Republican	David A. Hamil	44,693	40.37
Total votes		110,720	100.00

== General election ==
=== Candidates ===
Major party candidates

- John Arthur Love, Republican
- Stephen McNichols, Democratic

Other candidates

- Louis K. Stephens, Socialist Labor
- Stephen L. DeArvil, Independent

=== Results ===
1962 Colorado gubernatorial election
Party	Candidate	Votes	%	±%
Republican	John Arthur Love	349,342	56.67%	+15.08%
Democratic	Stephen McNichols (incumbent)	262,890	42.64%	−14.77%
Socialist Labor	Louis K. Stephens	2,511	0.41%	
Independent	Stephen L. DeArvil	1,738	0.28%	
Majority		86,452	14.03%	
Turnout		616,481		
Republican gain from Democratic		Swing		
