= Robert Lee Knous =

American politician

36th Lieutenant Governor of Colorado
- In office January 13, 1959 – January 10, 1967
- Governor: Stephen McNichols; John Arthur Love
- Preceded by: Frank L. Hays
- Succeeded by: Mark Anthony Hogan

Personal details
- Born: November 1, 1917 Ouray, Colorado, U.S.
- Died: May 15, 2000 (aged 82)
- Party: Democratic

Robert Lee Knous (November 1, 1917 – May 15, 2000) was an American politician who served as the 36th lieutenant governor of Colorado from 1959 to 1967 under Stephen McNichols and John Arthur Love.

== Early life ==
Knous was born on November 1, 1917, in Ouray, Colorado. He was the son of William Lee Knous and had one brother, Merle. The family moved to Montrose when Knous was six. After graduating from Montrose High School, where he was a member of the basketball and baseball teams, he worked in a mine briefly before enrolling at the University of Colorado. He enlisted with the United States Navy in 1941, while still studying for his bachelors degree, and served concurrently in the Naval Air Corps. Knous worked as a naval flight instructor and pilot for four and a half years during World War II, rising to the rank of lieutenant commander and logging more than 3,5000 hours, although he was never deployed overseas.

When the war ended, Knous moved to Denver and received his law degree from the University of Denver College of Law. He married Elizabeth Austin in 1943, who he had met in college, and the couple had five children: Robert Jr., Kathleen, Kristine, William and Jack. His father was elected governor of Colorado in 1946 and Knous worked for a time as his private secretary. He served as a deputy district attorney in Denver between 1947 and 1950.

== Political career ==
In 1952, Knous ran for election to the Colorado Senate and was elected to an at-large position. He was the largest vote-getter in the state. During his first term, he was appointed by Governor Ed C. Johnson to the Governor's Commission on the Aging in 1955. In this role, he wrote the Old Age Pension Act and voters approved a 1956 pension reform amendment to the state constitution. He was later appointed chair of the Governor's Commission for the White House Conference on Aging in 1960. Knous ran for lieutenant governor in 1956 and although he won 59 of 63 ocounties, he lost the election to Sam Taylor. Two years later, he ran again for the office and was elected over Frank Hayes. Knous was the first lieutenant governor to serve a four-year term, under Governor Stephen McNichols.

Knous ran for a seat in the United States Senate in 1960 but was unsuccessful, losing to Gordon Allott. That same year, the Democratic president John F. Kennedy had lost the state by 130,000 votes while Knous lost by only 68,000 votes. He was re-elected lieutenant governor in 1962, although McNichols was beat in his race for governor by the Republican John Arthur Love. Knous had the distinction of serving as lieutenant governor under both Democratic and Republican governors. He was the only Democrat to win statewide office in the 1962 elections. In 1966, Knous ran for governor but lost to Love.

== Later life and death ==
In 1958, Knous worked as an attorney for the Indian Claims Commission in Washington, D.C. and served as a commissioner with the Bureau of Indian Affairs. He moved back to Denver in 1973, where he died on May 15, 2000.

Party political offices
| Preceded by John A. Carroll | Democratic nominee for U.S. Senator from Colorado (Class 2); 1960 | Succeeded by Roy Romer |
| Preceded by Stephen McNichols | Democratic nominee Governor of Colorado; 1966 | Succeeded by Mark Anthony Hogan |
Political offices
| Preceded by Frank L. Hays | Lieutenant Governor of Colorado; 1959–1967 | Succeeded by Mark Anthony Hogan |
