= Hugh Gregg =

American politician (1917–2003)

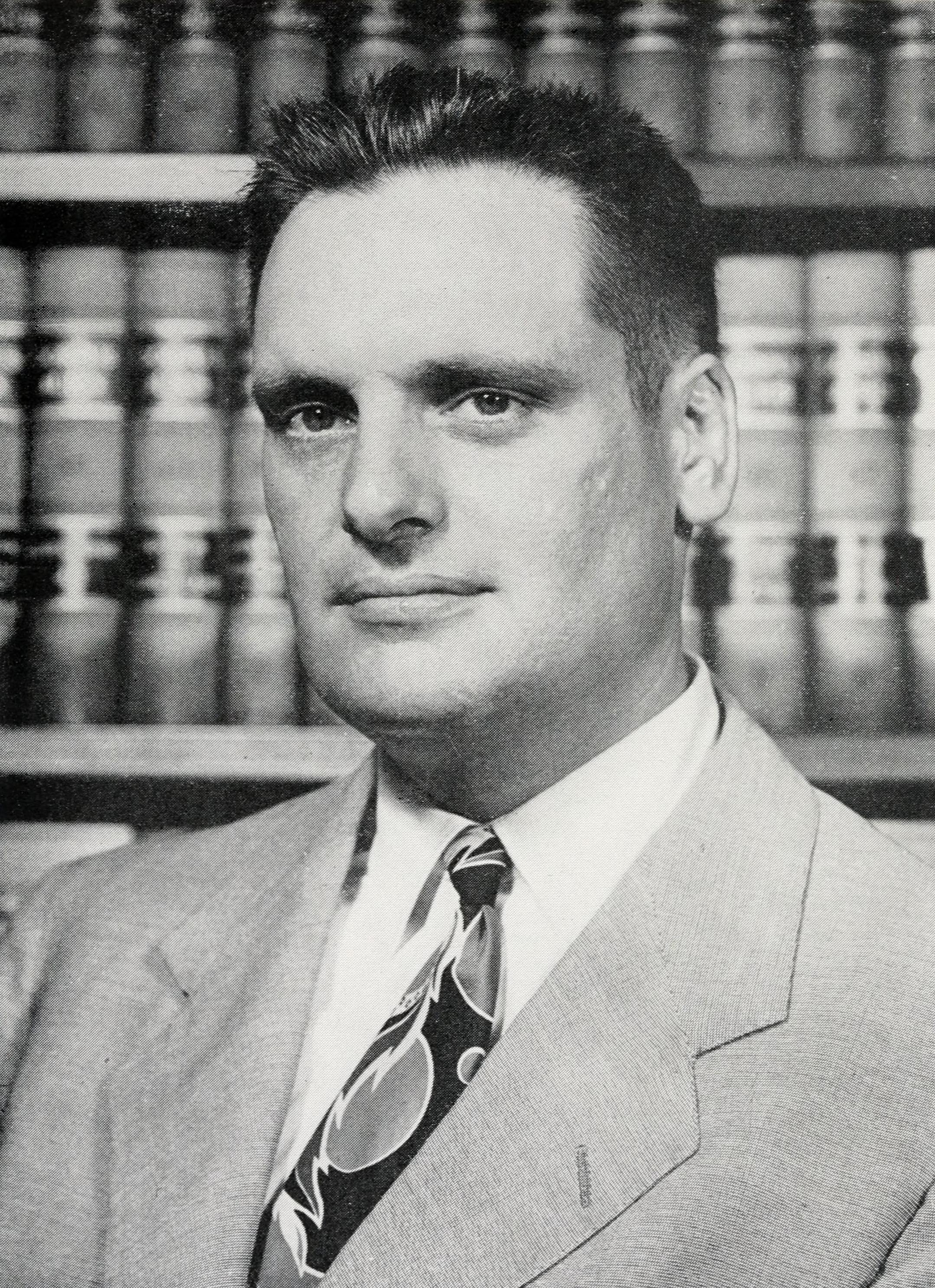

68th Governor of New Hampshire
- In office January 1, 1953 – January 6, 1955
- Preceded by: Sherman Adams
- Succeeded by: Lane Dwinell

Personal details
- Born: November 22, 1917 Nashua, New Hampshire, U.S.
- Died: September 24, 2003 (aged 85) Lebanon, New Hampshire, U.S.
- Party: Republican
- Spouse: Catherine Mitchell Warner

Hugh Gregg (November 22, 1917 – September 24, 2003) was an American businessman and politician who served as the 68th governor of New Hampshire from 1953 to 1955, and was the youngest person ever elected to that office. He is the father of former U.S. Senator and Governor Judd Gregg of New Hampshire.

== Life and career ==
A native of Nashua, New Hampshire, Gregg was the son of Margaret Prentiss (Richardson) and Harry Alan Gregg. He attended Phillips Exeter Academy. He graduated from Yale University in 1939 and Harvard Law School in 1942, after which he returned to Nashua and started a law practice. During World War II and the Korean War, he served as in the U.S. Army Counterintelligence Corps.

A Republican, he was elected in 1947 as a city alderman, and was subsequently elected mayor in 1950, a term cut short because of military duty. He served again in Army Counterintelligence (1950–1952) during the Korean War.

In 1952, he was elected governor of New Hampshire, defeating Democratic nominee William Craig by 69,867 votes. During Gregg’s Term, he Helped to create the New Hampshire “whooper week” to promote the state’s industrial and agricultural resources, along with its tourism programs. Gregg Did not seek re-election in 1954, and was succeeded by fellow Republican Lane Dwinell. Gregg ran for governor again in 1958, but lost the Republican primary to Wesley Powell by 396 votes. He ran again in 1960, again losing to Powell by 1,011 votes. He made one last campaign for governor in 1966, he won the Republican primary by 13,155 votes. in the general election he lost to incumbent Democratic governor John King by 18,623 votes.

Gregg was also a local businessman involved with the family mill-working business. He was instrumental in setting up the Nashua Foundation, which helped the city recover from the loss of textile mills in the 1950s, by recruiting new industry, including defense electronics firms and, later, Digital Equipment Corporation (DEC).

In later years, Gregg was best known for his defense of New Hampshire's first-in-the-nation presidential primary, as well as his contention that the Republican Party started in this state. in 1976 Gregg was Ronald Reagan's campaign manager in New Hampshire During the 1976 Republican Party presidential primaries.

Gregg was known for a sense of humor, reflected in a small hardback book he published, titled All I learned about politics, by Hugh Gregg. All of its pages are blank.

On September 24, 2003 Gregg died in Lebanon New Hampshire.

== See also ==
- List of mayors of Nashua, New Hampshire

Party political offices
Preceded by Sherman Adams	Republican nominee for Governor of New Hampshire; 1952	Succeeded by Lane Dwinell
Preceded by John Pillsbury	Republican nominee for Governor of New Hampshire; 1966	Succeeded by Walter R. Peterson Jr.
Political offices
Preceded by Sherman Adams	Governor of New Hampshire; 1953–1955	Succeeded by Lane Dwinell
