= George L. Brown =

American politician (1926–2006)

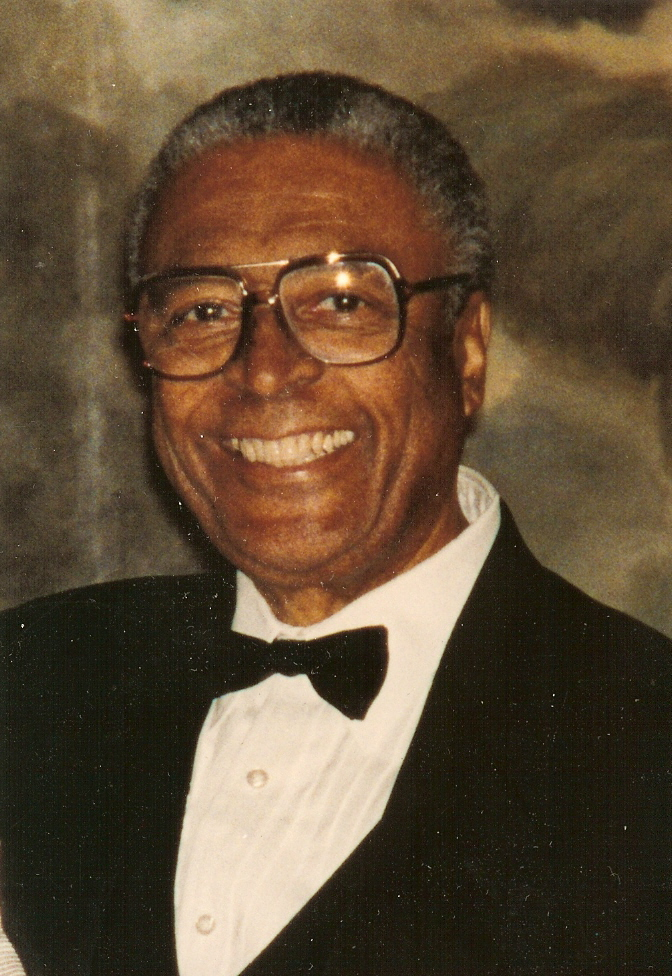

40th Lieutenant Governor of Colorado
- In office January 14, 1975 – January 10, 1979
- Governor: Richard Lamm
- Preceded by: Ted L. Strickland
- Succeeded by: Nancy Dick

Member of the Colorado Senate
- In office 1957–1974

Member of the Colorado House of Representatives
- In office 1955–1957

Personal details
- Born: July 1, 1926 Lawrence, Kansas, U.S.
- Died: March 31, 2006 (aged 79) Boca Raton, Florida, U.S.
- Party: Democratic
- Spouse: Modeen
- Education: University of Kansas, University of Colorado, University of Denver
- Profession: Politician

Military service
- Branch/service: United States Army Air Corps
- Years of service: 1944-1946
- Unit: Tuskegee Airmen
- Battles/wars: World War II

George Leslie Brown (July 1, 1926 – March 31, 2006) was an American politician. He served in the Colorado Senate from 1955 to 1974 and as the 40th Lieutenant Governor of Colorado from 1975 to 1979. He was also a senior vice president with Grumman Corporation. During World War II, he served as a Tuskegee Airman. Together with California's Mervyn Dymally, he was one of the first two Black lieutenant-governors since Reconstruction and outside any southern state.

== Early life ==
George Brown was the son of George L. Brown and Alberta née Watson Brown. Growing up on a farm in Kansas, Brown was a star athlete in basketball, football and track before graduating from Lawrence Liberty Memorial High School in 1944. Brown graduated from the University of Kansas in 1950 with a B.S. in journalism. He also did graduate work at Harvard Business School, the University of Colorado and the University of Denver.

== Career ==
For fourteen years, he worked as a writer and editor for The Denver Post and hosted his own Denver radio talk show. He was the first African American editor to work for a major daily newspaper in the Rocky Mountain region. Brown served as the assistant executive director for Denver's Public Housing Program for four years and taught at the University of Colorado and the University of Denver.

In 1956, Brown made history when he was elected to the Colorado State Senate. He served as a state senator for eighteen years, and was re-elected to five consecutive four-year terms. Then, in 1974, in the middle of his fifth Senate term, he was elected Lieutenant Governor of Colorado, a position he held for four years. Brown and California's Mervyn Dymally became the first two Black lieutenant-governors since Reconstruction and outside any southern state. In addition, Brown won the statewide primary election to get a seat on the gubernatorial democratic ticket; whereas Dymally was elected independently separately.

Brown's tenure was marred by controversy: in 1975 he claimed that in 1943, during his military training, he was in an airplane crash and the Alabama farmer whose field he crashed into chained him up and branded him with a "K" for the Ku Klux Klan. The brand later turned out to be from his college fraternity, Kappa Alpha Psi. Later, he said that the incident had happened to another cadet and he apologized for misleading people. Later in 1975, he was the subject of a grand jury investigation into travel expenses of around $3,600 he had billed the state. He said it was a clerical error and no charges were filed. In 1978, when Governor Richard Lamm was in Florida on holiday and Brown was acting as governor, he pardoned recently paroled former death row inmate Sylvester Lee Garrison, because Brown felt Garrison never received a fair trial, with an all-white jury and judge. When Lamm returned, he rescinded the pardon. Brown found serving as lieutenant governor "very frustrating", and he did not run for re-election in 1978. He was replaced on Lamm's ticket by Nancy Dick, and the two won the election.

Later in 1978, Lamm accused Brown of overspending his departmental budget by $10,000 and ordered the State Comptroller to withhold his final $2,083 paycheck. His supporters picketed Lamm and Dick's inauguration and in 1980 he sued Lamm for $500,000 for the withheld pay. The government settled, sending him a cheque for $10,000.

After his term as lieutenant governor had concluded, Brown never sought public office again. In 1979, Brown joined the Grumman Corporation as vice president for marketing and was later promoted to senior vice president in charge of the firm's regional offices, becoming the first African American corporate officer in a major U.S. aerospace company. He attended Harvard Business School's six-week Advanced Management Program in 1980, and worked as Grumman's chief lobbyist in Washington, D.C., until he left Grumman in 1990. That year, Brown joined the Washington, D.C. law firm of Whitten & Diamond. In March 1994, he was named director for Prudential Securities and managed its Washington public finance office. He was a banker for Greenwich Partners from 1997 to 2000.

== Later life and death ==
Brown died on March 31, 2006, of cancer.

== See also ==
- Executive Order 9981
- List of Tuskegee Airmen
- Military history of African Americans
- List of minority governors and lieutenant governors in the United States

Political offices
Preceded by Ted L. Strickland	Lieutenant Governor of Colorado; 1975–1979	Succeeded by Nancy Dick
