= Frank L. Hays =

American politician

35th Lieutenant Governor of Colorado
- In office January 8, 1957 – January 13, 1959
- Governor: Stephen McNichols
- Preceded by: Stephen McNichols
- Succeeded by: Robert Lee Knous

Personal details
- Born: January 6, 1922 Denver, Colorado, U.S.
- Died: January 25, 2003 (aged 81) Denver, Colorado, U.S.
- Party: Republican

Frank L. Hays (January 6, 1922 – January 25, 2003) was an American politician who served as the 35th Lieutenant Governor of Colorado from 1957 to 1959 under Governor Stephen McNichols.

Hays was born in Denver, Colorado on January 6, 1922. He served in the United States Army Air Forces during World War II, then became a lawyer. He served as a justice of the Colorado Supreme Court from 1947 to 1951, and then served three terms in the Colorado House of Representatives, from 1951 to 1957, and was majority floor leader from 1955 to 1957. He later became one of Colorado's first full-time lobbyists. He died on January 25, 2003, in Denver.

Political offices
Preceded by Stephen McNichols	Lieutenant Governor of Colorado; 1957–1959	Succeeded by Robert Lee Knous
