= Our Lady of the New Advent =

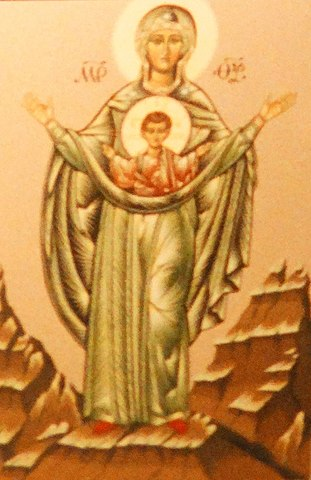
The icon of Our Lady of the New Advent in 1993

Our Lady of the New Advent is an icon of Mary associated with the Roman Catholic Archdiocese of Denver. It was written by Fr. William McNichols, SJ. The icon was presented to Pope John Paul II by Cardinal Francis Stafford on the occasion of the World Youth Day held in Denver, in 1993. The icon is based on the Mirozh icon and the hymn O Virgo Splendens. The memorial of Mary under this title is celebrated on 16 December in the Archdiocese of Denver.
