= 1966 Colorado gubernatorial election =

- November 8, 1966
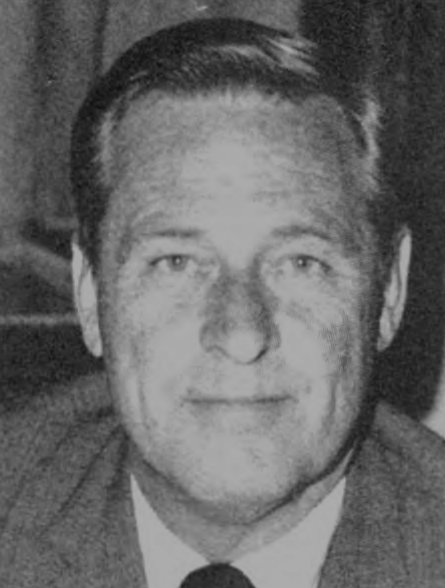

Nominee	John Arthur Love	Robert Lee Knous
Party	Republican	Democratic
Popular vote	356,730	287,132
Percentage	54.05%	43.50%
- County results Love: 40–50% 50–60% 60–70% Knous: 40–50% 50–60% 60–70%
Governor before election
John Arthur Love
Republican
Elected Governor
John Arthur Love
Republican

The 1966 Colorado gubernatorial election was held on November 8, 1966. Incumbent Republican John Arthur Love defeated Democratic nominee Robert Lee Knous with 54.05% of the vote.

== Primary elections ==
Primary elections were held on September 13, 1966.

=== Democratic primary ===
==== Candidates ====
- Robert Lee Knous, incumbent Lieutenant Governor

==== Results ====
Democratic primary results
Party	Candidate	Votes	%
Democratic	Robert Lee Knous	87,831	100.00

=== Republican primary ===
==== Candidates ====
- John Arthur Love, incumbent Governor

==== Results ====
Republican primary results
Party	Candidate	Votes	%
Republican	John Arthur Love (incumbent)	79,919	100.00

== General election ==
=== Candidates ===
Major party candidates

- John Arthur Love, Republican
- Robert Lee Knous, Democratic

Other candidates

- Levi Martinez, Independent

=== Results ===
1966 Colorado gubernatorial election
Party	Candidate	Votes	%	±%
Republican	John Arthur Love (incumbent)	356,730	54.05%	−2.62%
Democratic	Robert Lee Knous	287,132	43.50%	+0.86%
Independent	Levi Martinez	16,201	2.45%	
Majority		69,598	10.55%	−3.48%
Turnout		660,063		
Republican hold		Swing		
