= John W. King =

American judge

John William King
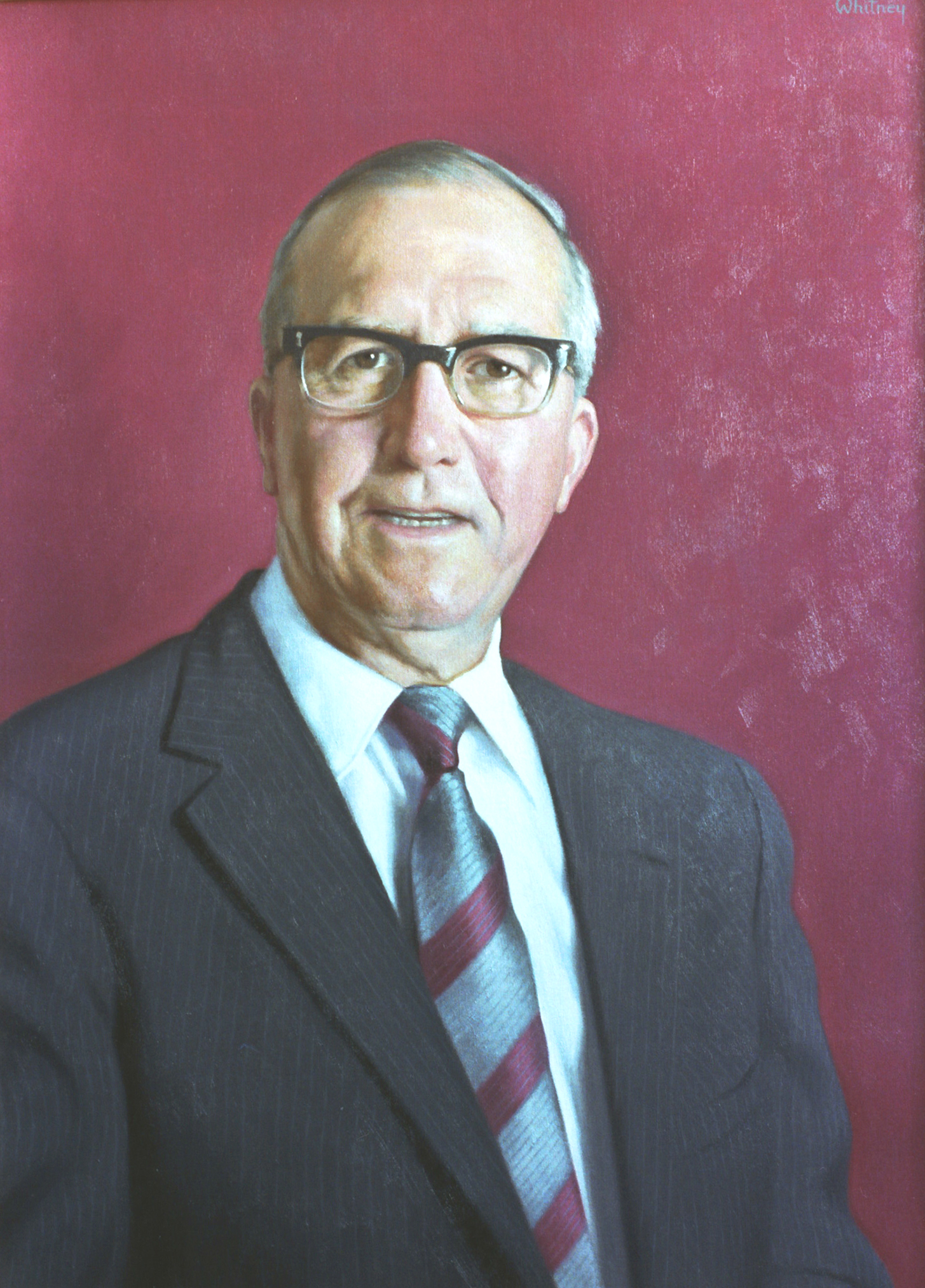

71st Governor of New Hampshire
- In office January 3, 1963 – January 2, 1969
- Preceded by: Wesley Powell
- Succeeded by: Walter R. Peterson, Jr.

Member of the New Hampshire House of Representatives
- In office 1957–1963

Personal details
- Born: October 10, 1916 Manchester, New Hampshire, U.S.
- Died: August 9, 1996 (aged 79) Manchester, New Hampshire, U.S.
- Party: Democratic

John William King (October 10, 1916 – August 9, 1996) was an American lawyer, jurist, and Democratic politician from Manchester, New Hampshire. He received his undergraduate degree from Harvard College and his law degree from Columbia Law School in 1943. He practiced law in Manchester and served in the New Hampshire House of Representatives. In 1962 he was elected governor of New Hampshire, becoming only the third Democratic governor of New Hampshire in 88 years, and the first since Fred Herbert Brown lost the 1924 election. After his three terms as the 71st governor of New Hampshire, he served on the New Hampshire Supreme Court from 1979, and as its Chief Justice from 1981 until 1986.

As Governor, King instituted the first state lottery in the nation since 1894. He was a major hawk and a fierce supporter of President Lyndon B. Johnson during the Vietnam War and the 1968 presidential election.

During his attacks on Senator Eugene McCarthy, Johnson's challenger in the New Hampshire primary, King questioned McCarthy's national loyalty and also warned that a strong vote for "the appeaser," would be "greeted with cheers in Hanoi."

King was a Roman Catholic and after his death in 1996 he was buried in the St. Joseph's Cemetery in Bedford, New Hampshire.

Party political offices
Preceded by Bernard L. Boutin	Democratic nominee for Governor of New Hampshire; 1962, 1964, 1966	Succeeded by Emile R. Bussiere
Preceded by Alfred Catalfo Jr.	Democratic nominee for U.S. Senator from New Hampshire (Class 3); 1968	Succeeded by John A. Durkin
Political offices
Preceded by Wesley Powell	Governor of New Hampshire; 1963–1969	Succeeded by Walter R. Peterson, Jr.
