= John D. Vanderhoof =

American politician

John Vanderhoof
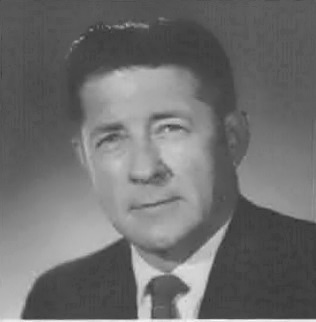
- From 1974's Annual Report of the Missouri River Basin Commission

37th Governor of Colorado
- In office July 16, 1973 – January 14, 1975
- Lieutenant: Ted Strickland
- Preceded by: John A. Love
- Succeeded by: Richard Lamm

38th Lieutenant Governor of Colorado
- In office January 12, 1971 – July 16, 1973
- Governor: John A. Love
- Preceded by: Mark Hogan
- Succeeded by: Ted Strickland

Speaker of the Colorado House of Representatives
- In office January 4, 1967 – January 6, 1971
- Preceded by: Allen Dines
- Succeeded by: John Fuhr
- In office January 2, 1963 – January 6, 1965
- Preceded by: Albert J. Tomsic
- Succeeded by: Allen Dines

Member of the Colorado House of Representatives
- In office 1950–1970

Personal details
- Born: John David Vanderhoof; May 27, 1922 Rocky Ford, Colorado, U.S.
- Died: September 19, 2013 (aged 91) Glenwood Springs, Colorado, U.S.
- Party: Republican
- Education: Glendale Community College, California

Military service
- Allegiance: United States
- Branch/service: United States Navy
- Unit: Naval Aviation
- Battles/wars: World War II

John David Vanderhoof (May 27, 1922 – September 19, 2013) was an American politician. A member of the Republican Party, Vanderhoof served as the 37th governor of Colorado from 1973 to 1975, assuming the office from John Arthur Love, who was appointed to the National Energy Policy Office by President Richard Nixon. Vanderhoof served out the remainder of Love's term, but failed to win a term in his own right, being defeated by Democrat Richard Lamm in the 1974 election.

== Early life and career ==
Born in Rocky Ford, Colorado, Vanderhoof graduated from Glendale College in California in 1942 and joined the Navy.

He served in Naval Aviation during World War II, flying over 100 sorties as a fighter pilot. In 1945, he suffered a broken leg when his aircraft was shot down near the Philippines and his parachute malfunctioned. Vanderhoof received two Purple Hearts, the Distinguished Flying Cross and three Air Medals for his service from 1943 to 1945.

After the war, he worked in the family sporting goods business and later became a bank executive.

Vanderhoof was elected to the Colorado House of Representatives in 1950, and served twenty years until 1970. He was a former chairman of the Game and Fish Committee and Business Affairs Committee of the House. Minority floor leader during the 43rd General Assembly and elected Speaker of the House for the 44th, 46th, and 47th General Assemblies.

In 1970, he became the first lieutenant governor elected under a new constitutional provision calling for the joint election of Governor and Lieutenant Governor.

In 1974, Vanderhoof sought election as Governor in his own right. In the Republican primary, Vanderhoof dispatched conservative cable television executive Bill Daniels with over 60% of the vote. He was defeated in the 1974 general election by State Senator Richard Lamm, 53% to 46%.

== Colorado Apollo 17 Goodwill Moon Rock ==
In 2010, Richard Kevin Griffis, a graduate student at the University of Phoenix was assigned the task of tracking down the Apollo 17 Goodwill Moon Rock by his Professor Joseph Gutheinz. He discovered that the Colorado Apollo 17 Goodwill Moon Rock was missing, which led to the admission by Vanderhoof that he had possession of one of two Colorado Moon rock displays that was presented to the state of Colorado by President Richard Nixon in the 1970s. Vanderhoof voluntarily surrendered the rock, which at the time was estimated to be worth $5 million. The rock was subsequently put on display at the Colorado School of Mines Geology Museum.

== Death ==
He died on September 19, 2013, aged 91.

Political offices
Preceded by Mark Hogan	Lieutenant Governor of Colorado; 1971–1973	Succeeded by Ted Strickland
Preceded by John Love	Governor of Colorado; 1973–1975	Succeeded by Richard Lamm
Party political offices
Preceded by John Love	Republican nominee for Governor of Colorado; 1974	Succeeded by Ted Strickland
