= Thomas T. Farley =

American lawyer and politician

Thomas Tancred "Tom" Farley (November 10, 1934 – August 23, 2010) was an American lawyer and politician.

Born in Pueblo, Colorado, Farley graduated from Pueblo Catholic High School in 1952. He then received his bachelor's degree in economics from Santa Clara University in 1956. Farley then received his law degree from University of Colorado Law School. Farley practiced law in Pueblo, Colorado. Farley served in the Colorado House of Representatives from 1965 to 1974 and was a Democrat. He died in a Pueblo hospital from pancreatic cancer. Immediately prior to his death, Congressman Ray Kogovsek stated that, "I told him how much I appreciated his friendship, how much he contributed to the state of Colorado and to this city. And though it was difficult for me to say — and I never thought I'd say it — I was able to tell him, 'I'm gonna miss you, Farley.’ ”
