= 1956 United States Senate election in Colorado =

- November 6, 1956
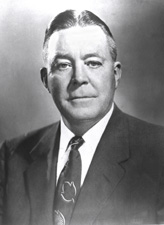

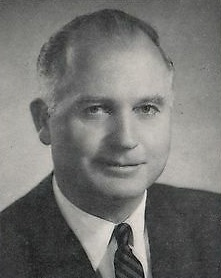
Nominee	John A. Carroll	Daniel I. J. Thornton
Party	Democratic	Republican
Popular vote	319,872	317,102
Percentage	50.22%	49.78%
- County results Carroll: 50–60% 60–70% Thornton: 50–60% 60–70%
U.S. senator before election
Eugene Millikin
Republican
Elected U.S. Senator
John A. Carroll
Democratic

The 1956 United States Senate special election in Colorado took place on November 6, 1956. Incumbent Republican Senator Eugene Millikin declined to seek re-election to a third term and a competitive election ensued. Former Congressman John A. Carroll, in his third consecutive bid for the Senate, narrowly defeated former U.S. Secretary of Agriculture Charles F. Brannan in the Democratic primary and advanced to the general election, where he faced Governor Dan Thornton, the Republican nominee. Despite Democratic presidential nominee Adlai Stevenson's poor performance in Colorado, state-level Democrats fared much better. Carroll ended up narrowly defeating Thornton, winning his only term in the U.S. Senate.

== Democratic primary ==
=== Candidates ===
- John A. Carroll, former U.S. Congressman from Colorado's 1st congressional district, 1950 and 1954 Democratic nominee for the U.S. Senate
- Charles F. Brannan, former U.S. Secretary of Agriculture

=== Results ===
Democratic primary results
Party	Candidate	Votes	%
Democratic	John A. Carroll	62,688	50.81
Democratic	Charles F. Brannan	60,701	49.19
Total votes		123,389	100.00

== Republican primary ==
=== Candidates ===
- Dan Thornton, former Governor

=== Results ===
Republican primary results
Party	Candidate	Votes	%
Republican	Dan Thornton	79,349	100.00
Total votes		79,349	100.00

== General election ==
=== Results ===
1956 United States Senate election in Colorado
Party	Candidate	Votes	%	±%
Democratic	John A. Carroll	319,872	50.22%	+3.47%
Republican	Dan Thornton	317,102	49.78%	−3.47%
Majority		2,770	0.43%	−6.07%
Turnout		636,974		
Democratic gain from Republican				

== See also ==
- 1956 Colorado gubernatorial election in Colorado
