= Governor Ammons =

Governor Ammons may refer to:

- Elias M. Ammons (1860–1925), 19th Governor of Colorado
- Teller Ammons (1895–1972), 28th Governor of Colorado, son of Elias M. Ammons.
