= 1942 United States Senate special election in Colorado =

- November 3, 1942
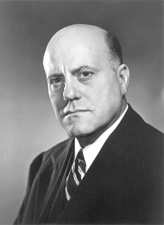

Nominee	Eugene Millikin	James A. Marsh
Party	Republican	Democratic
Popular vote	191,517	143,817
Percentage	56.12%	42.14%
- County results Millikin: 40–50% 50–60% 60–70% 70–80% Marsh: 40–50% 50–60%
U.S. senator before election
Eugene Millikin
Republican
Elected U.S. Senator
Eugene Millikin
Republican

The 1942 United States Senate special election in Colorado took place on November 3, 1942. Democratic senator Alva B. Adams died in office on December 1, 1941, and Republican Governor Ralph L. Carr appointed Denver oilman Eugene Millikin to fill the vacancy. Millikin ran for election for the remainder of Adams's term. He was opposed in the general election by James A. Marsh, the former chairman of the state Democratic Party. Aided in part by the nationwide Republican landslide, Millikin easily defeated Marsh to serve out the remainder of the term. Carr was also a candidate for the U.S Senate in the regular Senate election hoping to join Millikin, but Carr failed to unseat the Democratic incumbent Edwin C. Johnson, a conservative Democrat.

== Democratic primary ==
=== Candidates ===
- James A. Marsh, former chairman of the Colorado Democratic Party

=== Campaign ===
Most of the competitive Democratic primaries in 1942 emerged in the races for the regular Senate seat and for Governor. Former state party chairman James A. Marsh was seen as the frontrunner for the special election, along with Oscar Chapman, the U.S. Assistant Secretary of the Interior and Alva Adams's former campaign manager. However, Chapman ultimately announced that he would not run, and Marsh won the nomination unopposed.

=== Results ===
Democratic primary results
Party	Candidate	Votes	%
Democratic	James A. Marsh	54,606	100.00
Total votes		54,606	100.00

== Republican primary ==
=== Candidates ===
- Eugene Millikin, incumbent U.S. Senator

=== Results ===
Republican primary results
Party	Candidate	Votes	%
Republican	Eugene D. Millikin (inc.)	41,660	100.00
Total votes		41,660	100.00

== General election ==
=== Results ===
1942 United States Senate election in Colorado
Party	Candidate	Votes	%	±%
Republican	Eugene Millikin (inc.)	191,517	56.12%	+15.94%
Democratic	James A. Marsh	143,817	42.14%	−16.10%
Independent	Lewis Harley Tiley	4,262	1.25%	—
Socialist	Edgar P. Sherman	1,664	0.49%	−0.31%
Majority		47,700	13.98%	−4.09%
Turnout		341,260		
Republican hold				
