= Senator Ammons =

Senator Ammons may refer to:

- Elias M. Ammons (1860–1925), Colorado State Senate
- Teller Ammons (1895–1972), Colorado State Senate
