= 1956 Colorado gubernatorial election =

- November 6, 1956
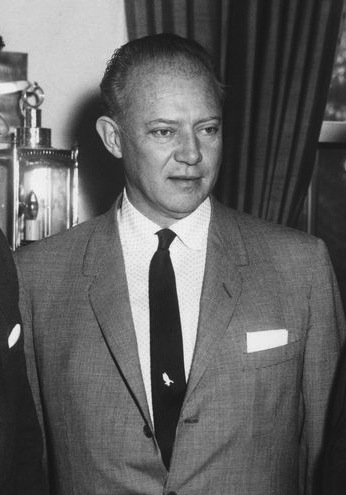

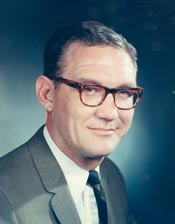
Nominee	Stephen McNichols	Donald Brotzman
Party	Democratic	Republican
Popular vote	331,283	313,950
Percentage	51.34%	48.66%
- County results McNichols: 50–60% 60–70% Brotz: 50–60% 60–70%
Governor before election
Edwin C. Johnson
Democratic
Elected Governor
Stephen McNichols
Democratic

The 1956 Colorado gubernatorial election was held on November 6, 1956. Democratic nominee Stephen McNichols defeated Republican nominee Donald G. Brotzman with 51.34% of the vote.

== Primary elections ==
Primary elections were held on September 11, 1956.

=== Democratic primary ===
==== Candidates ====
- Stephen McNichols, incumbent Lieutenant Governor

==== Results ====
Democratic primary results
Party	Candidate	Votes	%
Democratic	Stephen McNichols	104,196	100.00

=== Republican primary ===
==== Candidates ====
- Donald G. Brotzman, State Senator

==== Results ====
Republican primary results
Party	Candidate	Votes	%
Republican	Donald G. Brotzman	79,638	100.00

== General election ==
=== Candidates ===
- Stephen McNichols, Democratic
- Donald G. Brotzman, Republican

=== Results ===
1956 Colorado gubernatorial election
Party	Candidate	Votes	%	±%
Democratic	Stephen McNichols	331,283	51.34%	−2.22%
Republican	Donald G. Brotzman	313,950	48.66%	+2.22%
Majority		17,333	2.68%	
Turnout		645,233		
Democratic hold		Swing		

== Analysis ==
McNichols narrowly won the election by being able to capture majority of the vote in Colorado's then two largest cities and counties: Denver and Pueblo. He also won Adams, Denver and Pueblo counties along with several rural farming counties and the coal counties of southern Colorado. Meanwhile, Brotzman performed best in large farming areas as well as in several cities like Fort Collins, Boulder, and Golden. Factors like Democrats being better organized along with McNichols being a popular lieutenant governor to also popular governor Edwin Johnson helped propel him to victory.

== See also ==
- 1956 United States Senate election in Colorado
