= Theodosia Grace Ammons =

American suffragist and academic (1861–1907)

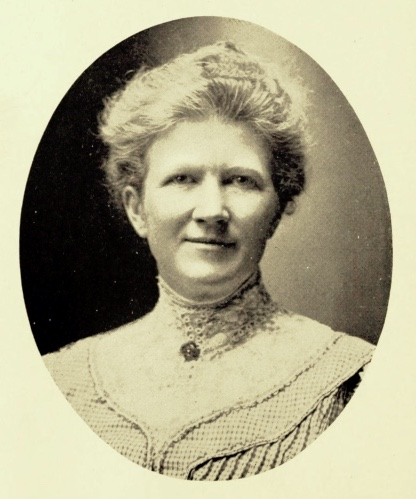
- Theodosia Ammons, Representative Women of Colorado, 1914
- Born: August 3, 1861; North Carolina
- Died: July 17, 1907 (aged 45); Denver
- Organization(s): Colorado Equal Suffrage Association, president
- Known for: Suffragist and lecturer in domestic science

Signature
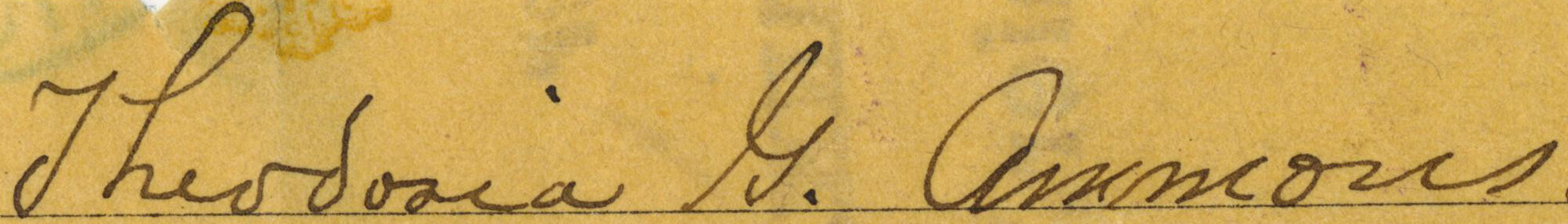

Theodosia Grace Ammons (August 3, 1861 – July 17, 1907) was an American suffragist, co-founder with Eliza Pickrell Routt of the Department of Domestic Economy at Colorado Agricultural College, and the first female dean at the college.

== Early life ==
Theodosia Ammons was born in North Carolina, the daughter of Jehu Richard Ammons and Margaret Caroline Brendle Ammons. She moved to Denver, Colorado with her family when she was a child. Her father was a Baptist minister. Her brother Elias M. Ammons and her nephew Teller Ammons both served terms as governor of Colorado. Theodosia Ammons graduated from high school in Denver, and was a schoolteacher as a young woman.

== Career ==
Ammons and Eliza Routt met through suffrage work, and found they shared an interest in higher education and domestic science. Together they founded the Department of Domestic Economy at Colorado Agricultural College (now Colorado State University) in 1895. Ammons was the first woman faculty member in the college. In 1902, the program was renamed the Department of Domestic Science, and Ammons promoted scientific methods for cooking, hygiene, and architecture in homes. Ammons became the Dean of Woman's Work at the university, the first woman to hold that rank at Colorado State University. She was principal of the domestic economy program in the Colorado Chautauqua School, and designed a model home, "Gwenthean Cottage", to demonstrate best practices for health and efficiency.

Ammons was president of the Colorado Equal Suffrage Association. She was also a lecturer in the Colorado State Grange. Ammons attended a national suffrage convention in Washington, D. C. in 1902, and spoke in a Congressional hearing, representing Colorado women voters. In 1903, she represented Colorado at a national suffrage convention in New Orleans.

== Personal life and legacy ==
Theodosia Grace Ammons died in 1907 at the age of 45 in Denver. Her papers are archived at Colorado State University, in the Archives and Special Collections department. A portrait of Theodosia Ammons was donated to the University and unveiled in 1931. There is a stained glass window in Guggenheim Hall at Colorado State University in Ammons' memory. Ammons is one of the first 24 women featured in the Zonta International public art exhibit "Her Legacy: Women of Fort Collins". In 2022, she was inducted into the Colorado Women's Hall of Fame.
