= 1954 Colorado gubernatorial election =

- November 2, 1954
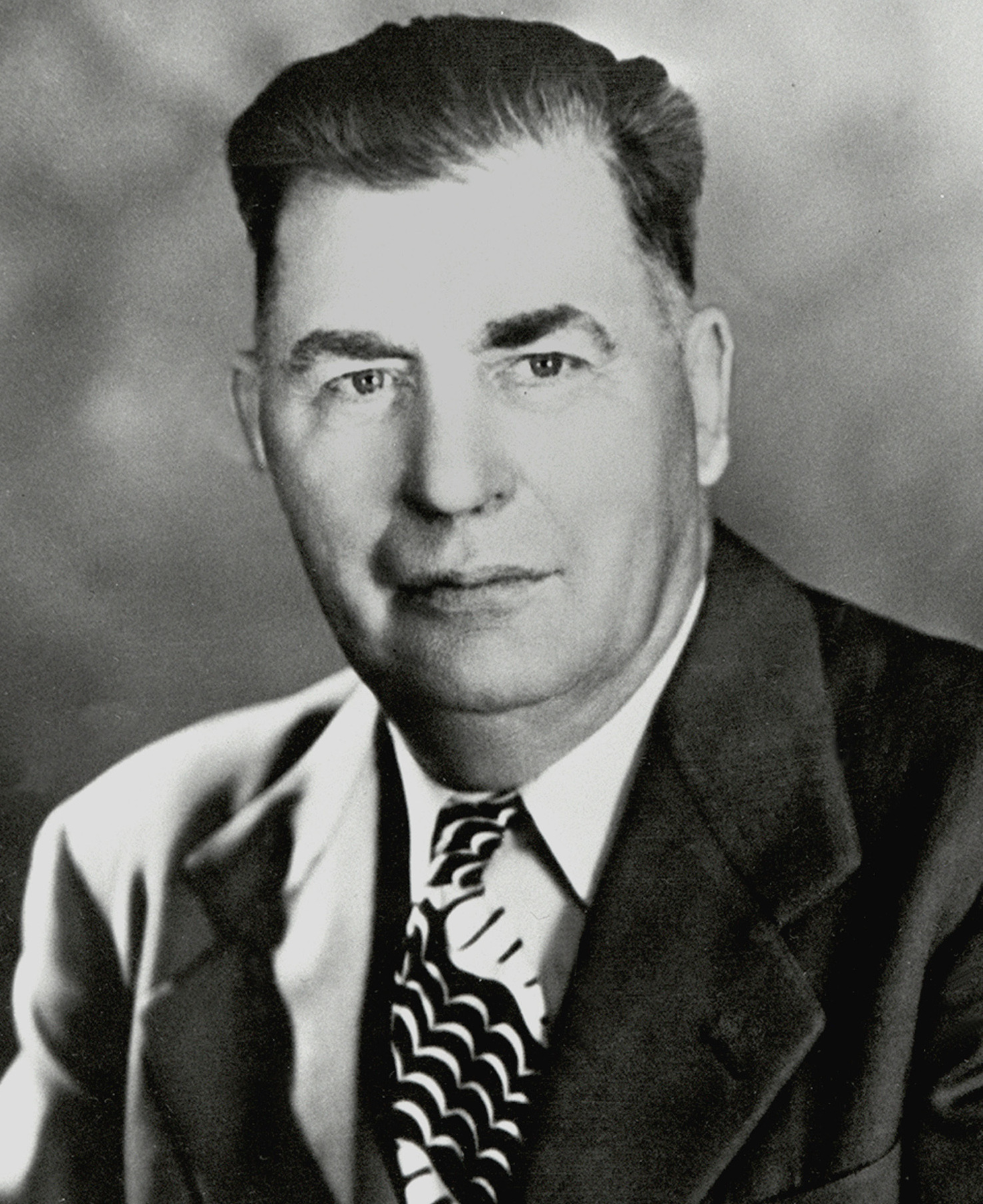

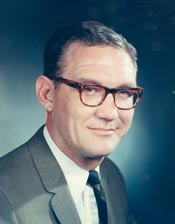
Nominee	Edwin C. Johnson	Donald G. Brotzman
Party	Democratic	Republican
Popular vote	262,205	227,335
Percentage	53.56%	46.44%
- County results Johnson: 50–60% 60–70% 70–80% Brotzman: 50–60%
Governor before election
Daniel I. J. Thornton
Republican
Elected Governor
Edwin C. Johnson
Democratic

The 1954 Colorado gubernatorial election was held on November 2, 1954. Democratic nominee Edwin C. Johnson defeated Republican nominee Donald G. Brotzman with 53.56% of the vote.

== Primary elections ==
Primary elections were held on September 9, 1954.

=== Democratic primary ===
==== Candidates ====
- Edwin C. Johnson, United States Senator

==== Results ====
Democratic primary results
Party	Candidate	Votes	%
Democratic	Edwin C. Johnson	118,824	100.00

=== Republican primary ===
==== Candidates ====
- Donald G. Brotzman, State Senator

==== Results ====
Republican primary results
Party	Candidate	Votes	%
Republican	Donald G. Brotzman	69,740	100.00

== General election ==
=== Candidates ===
- Edwin C. Johnson, Democratic
- Donald G. Brotzman, Republican

=== Results ===
1954 Colorado gubernatorial election
Party	Candidate	Votes	%	±%
Democratic	Edwin C. Johnson	262,205	53.56%	+11.14%
Republican	Donald G. Brotzman	227,335	46.44%	−10.64%
Majority		34,870	7.12%	
Turnout		489,540		
Democratic gain from Republican		Swing		
