= 1936 Colorado gubernatorial election =

- November 3, 1936
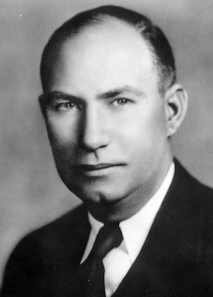

Nominee	Teller Ammons	Charles M. Armstrong
Party	Democratic	Republican
Popular vote	263,311	210,614
Percentage	54.57%	43.65%
- County results Ammons: 40–50% 50–60% 60–70% Armstrong: 40–50% 50–60%
Governor before election
Edwin C. Johnson
Democratic
Elected Governor
Teller Ammons
Democratic

The 1936 Colorado gubernatorial election was held on November 3, 1936. Democratic nominee Teller Ammons defeated Republican nominee Charles M. Armstrong with 54.57% of the vote.

== Primary elections ==
Primary elections were held on September 8, 1936.

=== Democratic primary ===
==== Candidates ====
- Teller Ammons, State Senator
- Moses E. Smith, State Representative
- Ray Herbert Talbot, incumbent Lieutenant Governor

Ammons: 30–40%; 40–50%; 50–60%; 60–70%; Smith: 30–40%; 40–50%; 50–60%; 70–80%; Talbot: 30–40%; 40–50%; 50–60%; 70–80%

==== Results ====
As popular outgoing Governor Ed Johnson sought election to the U.S. Senate, the Democratic primary became an all-out brawl between Lt. Governor Ray Talbot (Pueblo), State Senator and Denver City's Attorney Teller Ammons (Denver), and State Rep. Moses E. Smith (Ault). Alva Swain of the Wray Gazette summarized the race, writing:

"With Ammons, Talbot, and Smith contesting for the governorship, there will be another determined struggle. The latter fight divides the democrats of the state three ways: the City of Denver with its powerful democratic machine will be for Tell Ammons; Laboring people, on the whole, will be for Ray Talbot; while the agriculturalists and the small businessmen will be for Smith. It is a beautiful division almost equal in strength."

In the end, Ammons was able to decisively win the primary through overwhelming support in Denver and its surrounding areas and moderate support throughout the rest of the state. In Denver alone, he netted nearly 20,000 votes over his nearest rival.

Democratic primary results
Party	Candidate	Votes	%
Democratic	Teller Ammons	58,048	42.7%
Democratic	Moses E. Smith	39,620	29.1%
Democratic	Ray Herbert Talbot	38,378	28.2%
Total votes		136,046	

=== Republican primary ===
==== Candidates ====
- Charles M. Armstrong, Colorado State Treasurer

==== Results ====
Republican primary results
Party	Candidate	Votes	%
Republican	Charles M. Armstrong	77,323	100.00
Total votes		77,323	100.00

== General election ==
=== Candidates ===
Major party candidates

- Teller Ammons, Democratic
- Charles M. Armstrong, Republican

Other candidates

- Huston Hugh Marrs, Farmer–Labor
- Paul S. McCormick, Socialist
- James Allander, Communist
- Claude C. Buhrman, National Union for Social Justice
- Harvey L. Mayfield, Independent

=== Results ===
1936 Colorado gubernatorial election
Party	Candidate	Votes	%	±%
Democratic	Teller Ammons	263,311	54.57%	−3.54%
Republican	Charles M. Armstrong	210,614	43.65%	+3.74%
Farmer–Labor	Huston Hugh Marrs	5,162	1.07%	
Socialist	Paul S. McCormick	1,498	0.31%	−1.00%
Communist	James Allander	948	0.20%	−0.12%
Union	Claude C. Buhrman	825	0.17%	N/A
Independent	Harvey L. Mayfield	177	0.04%	N/A
Majority		52,697	10.92%	
Turnout		482,535		
Democratic hold		Swing		
