= 1944 United States Senate election in Colorado =

- November 7, 1944
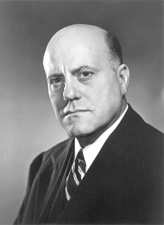

Nominee	Eugene Millikin	Barney L. Whatley
Party	Republican	Democratic
Popular vote	277,410	214,335
Percentage	56.06%	43.31%
- County results Millikin: 50–60% 60–70% 70–80% Whatley: 50–60% 60–70%
U.S. senator before election
Eugene Millikin
Republican
Elected U.S. Senator
Eugene Millikin
Republican

The 1944 United States Senate special election in Colorado took place on November 7, 1944. Incumbent Republican senator Eugene Millikin, who was first appointed to fill Alva B. Adams's seat in 1941 and re-elected at the ensuing special election in 1942, ran for re-election to his first full term. In the general election, he faced wealthy Denver attorney Barney L. Whatley. Millikin benefited from the strong Republican performance in Colorado—Thomas E. Dewey and Governor John C. Vivian both won their respective elections by decisive margins—and cruised to a landslide victory over Whatley.

== Democratic primary ==
=== Candidates ===
- Barney L. Whatley, Denver attorney, former chairman of the Colorado Democratic Party, former District Attorney for the Fifth Judicial District

=== Campaign ===
Though Colorado remained competitive for both parties in state and national politics, the state Democratic Party had few candidates interested in running against Senator Millikin. Though the party had attempted to recruit James G. Patton, the president of the National Farmers Union, to run, he declined to do so. Barney L. Whatley, a prominent Denver attorney who served as district attorney for the Fifth Judicial Circuit from 1913 to 1921 and more recently as chairman of the state party, initially declined to run, but ultimately accepted the nomination, saying that someone "must carry the issue of this campaign to the crossroads of the state."

=== Results ===
Democratic primary results
Party	Candidate	Votes	%
Democratic	Barney L. Whatley	31,625	100.00
Total votes		31,625	100.00

== Republican primary ==
=== Candidates ===
- Eugene Millikin, incumbent U.S. Senator

=== Results ===
Republican primary results
Party	Candidate	Votes	%
Republican	Eugene D. Millikin (inc.)	40,868	100.00
Total votes		40,868	100.00

== General election ==
=== Results ===
1944 United States Senate election in Colorado
Party	Candidate	Votes	%	±%
Republican	Eugene Millikin (inc.)	277,410	56.06%	−0.07%
Democratic	Barney L. Whatley	214,335	43.31%	+1.17%
Socialist	Carle Whitehead	3,143	0.64%	−0.61%
Majority		63,075	12.75%	−1.23%
Turnout		494,888		
Republican hold				
