= Governor Talbot =

Governor Talbot may refer to:

- Matthew Talbot (1767–1827), 30th Governor of Georgia
- Ray Herbert Talbot (1896–1955), 27th Governor of Colorado
- Thomas Talbot (Massachusetts politician) (1818–1885), 31st Governor of Massachusetts
