= Henry Louis Larsen =

US Marine Corps general and Military Governor of Guam (1890–1962)

Lieutenant General Henry Louis Larsen
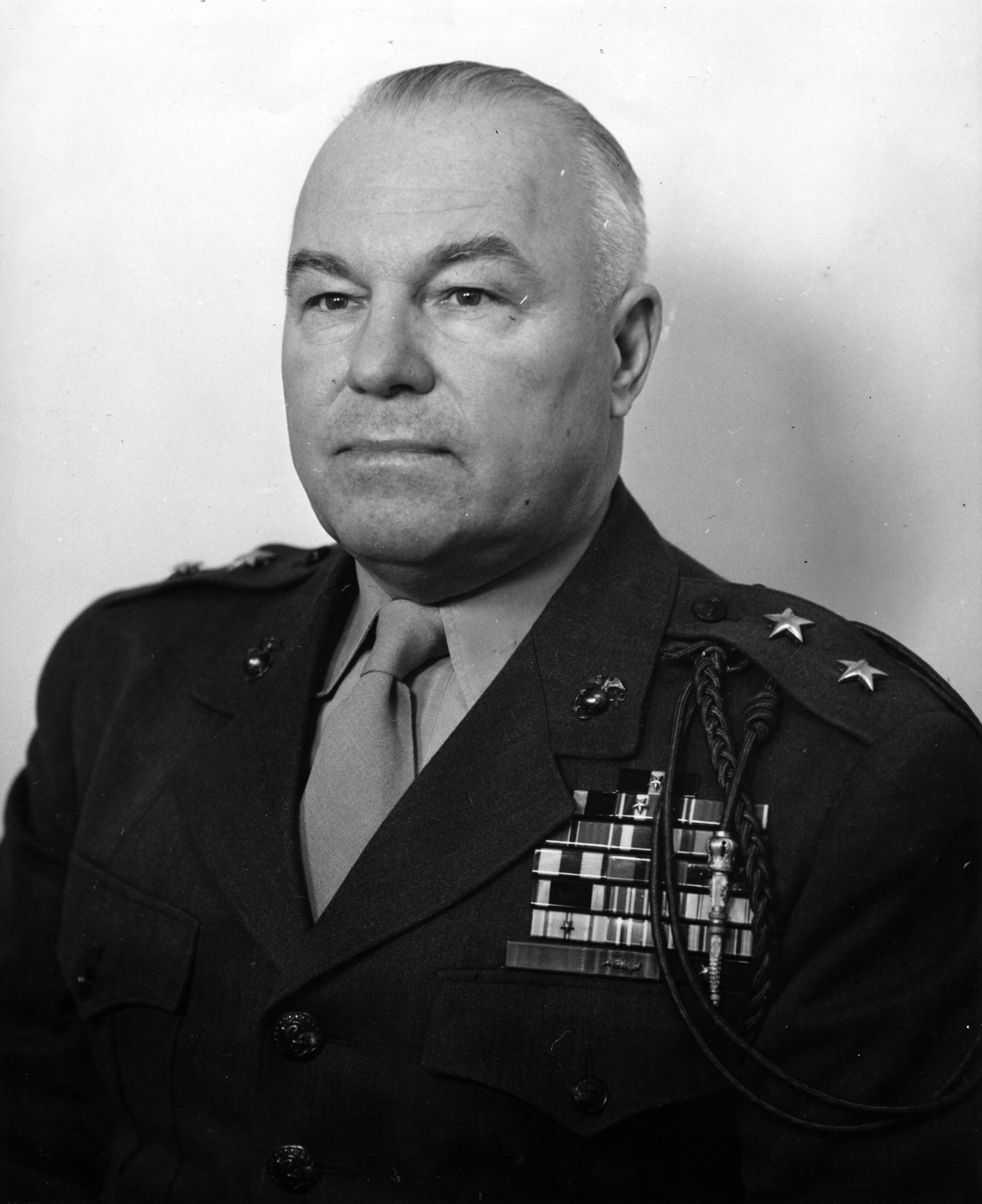
- Henry Larsen as Governor of Guam

2nd Military Governor of Guam
- In office August 15, 1944 – May 30, 1946
- Preceded by: Roy Stanley Geiger
- Succeeded by: Charles Alan Pownall

Military Governor of American Samoa
- In office January 12, 1942 – April 25, 1942
- Governor: Laurence Wild (alongside as the Governor)
- Succeeded by: John Gould Moyer

Personal details
- Born: December 10, 1890 Chicago, Illinois, U.S.
- Died: October 2, 1962 (aged 71) Denver, Colorado, U.S.
- Resting place: Arlington National Cemetery
- Spouse: Elizabeth Ammons Larsen
- Education: Army and Navy Academy
- Occupation: Military officer, Governor of American Samoa, Governor of Guam
- Awards: Navy Cross (2); Silver Star (3); Navy Distinguished Service Medal (2); Bronze Star Medal; Nicaraguan Presidential Medal of Merit; Legion of Honour (France); Croix de guerre (France)

Military service
- Allegiance: United States
- Branch/service: United States Marine Corps
- Years of service: 1913–1946
- Rank: Lieutenant general
- Commands: Department of the Pacific; Camp Lejeune; 8th Marine Regiment; 3rd Battalion 11th Marines; 3rd Battalion 5th Marines
- Battles/wars: World War I: Battle of Belleau Wood; Banana Wars: Nicaragua; World War II

Lieutenant General Henry Louis Larsen (December 10, 1890 – October 2, 1962) was a United States Marine Corps officer, the second Military Governor of Guam following its recapture from the Empire of Japan, and the first post-World War II Governor of Guam. He also served as the Military Governor of American Samoa alongside civilian Governor of American Samoa Laurence Wild. Larsen was among the first troops overseas in both World Wars. During World War I, he commanded the 3rd Battalion 5th Marines and participated in numerous battles in France, earning the Navy Cross, three Silver Stars, the Croix de guerre with palm, and the French Legion of Honour. In between the World Wars, he served during the United States occupation of Nicaragua, where he earned his second Navy Cross, the Presidential Medal of Merit from President of Nicaragua José María Moncada Tapia, and his first Navy Distinguished Service Medal.

He served as the director of plans and policies for the Marine Corps until the United States became involved in World War II. He commanded the first troops to leave the United States – the 8th Marine Regiment. During the war he served as military governor of both American Samoa and Guam. On Guam he faced an island with large infrastructure damage from the two battles that had taken place there and undertook a project to transform Guam into a forward military base housing large numbers of troops. In the single largest construction project ever undertaken by the United States Navy, Larsen converted the island into an air and sea base that frequently launched attacks on the main Japanese islands. He also oversaw the capturing of remaining guerrilla Japanese forces and contended with race rioting between white and African American sailors and Marines.

== Life ==
Larsen was born on December 10, 1890, in Chicago to Andrew A. Larsen, a builder, and his wife. He moved with his family to Denver, Colorado, when at the age of 16. He attended the Army and Navy Academy boarding school.

He was fluent in French, Spanish, and Norwegian and served as a certified interpreter for all three.

== Military service ==
Larsen joined the United States Marine Corps at the age of 23; he earned top marks in a class of 75 at Officer Candidates School. He commanded the 3rd Battalion 5th Marines during World War I. Shortly after being field promoted to the rank of major, he led a liaison mission on June 25, 1918, during the Battle of Belleau Wood, for which he received a Citation Star. On October 4, 1918, the battalion's flanks became exposed while operating alongside the Fourth French Army near Rheims. The Germans attacked multiple times, but despite this the battalion managed to maintain all of the ground they had taken. For Larsen's heroic command during the two-day defense he was awarded the Navy Cross and a second Citation Star. He received a third Citation Star during the war; all three were later converted to Silver Stars, making him the recipient of three Silver Star awards. He participated in every major action undertaken by the Marine Corps during the First World War, and was the only member of the 3rd Battalion to serve during the war without being wounded. In 1919, France awarded him the Croix de Guerre with palm and the Legion of Honour for his actions during the war.

After the First World War, he served in a number of posts on both American Samoa, United States holdings in the Caribbean, and in Mexico. He participated in the United States occupation of Nicaragua from April 1, 1928, to March 26, 1929, as the brigade inspector of the 2nd Brigade and commander of the 3rd Battalion 11th Marines. He earned his second Navy Cross while in this position. He earned the Presidential Medal of Merit from President of Nicaragua José María Moncada Tapia and his first Navy Distinguished Service Medal in 1929. He was among a few Marine officers who were instructed at the École Militaire in France as part of an officer training exchange program in the 1930s

From 1938 to 1940, Larsen served as the director of plans and policies at the Headquarters Marine Corps in Washington, D.C. He oversaw the immediate expansion of the Marine Corps following the attack on Pearl Harbor and soon after went to American Samoa as the commander of the 8th Marine Regiment, the first combat troops to leave the Continental United States during the war. In June 1943, he assumed command of the Marine Corps Base Camp Lejeune in North Carolina. He left the post to become Island Commander of Guam on July 21, 1944, shortly before becoming governor of the island.

Following the war and his governorship, Larsen assumed the position of commanding general of the Department of the Pacific. He retired as a lieutenant general on November 1, 1946. He wrote several military texts on amphibious warfare, a style of warfare which he helped pioneer, and other topics. He earned the Navy Distinguished Service Medal twice, and the Bronze Star Medal once.

== Governorships ==
=== American Samoa ===
President Franklin D. Roosevelt appointed Larsen the first and only Military Governor of American Samoa on January 15, 1942. He served alongside the Naval Governor Laurence Wild. This led to an odd situation where Larsen outranked Wild militarily while, at the same time, Wild held a position of senior authority to Larsen. Larsen negotiated the American occupation of Western Samoa with New Zealand during World War II.

=== Guam ===
Larsen served as Governor of Guam from August 15, 1944, to May 30, 1946. Larsen mainly concerned himself with military and construction affairs, leaving the day-to-day administration of the island to Commander James Barton, the Deputy Chief Military Government Officer. The government was restructured into a martial one with ten departments to oversee things like education, labor, and public wealth. Much of this remained similar to the naval government in place before the Japanese invasion of the island, though Larsen had increased power to change governmental organization or law by decree. During his tenure, the term Guamanian first became popular as opposed to referring to the natives as Chamorro as the Chamorro people of Guam and the Japanese held island of Saipan had to be differentiated. He oversaw an effort to round up the remaining Japanese forces who remained on the island. This included a plan in which some senior Japanese prisoners were released under the promise that they would round up other hidden forces and order them to surrender.

A number of altercations involving the service of African American serviceman alongside whites ensued while Larsen commanded the island's forces. These included the shooting of an African American Marine by a white sailor and attacks on African American barracks by whites with smoke grenades. Despite Larsen issuing a statement calling for respect toward military members of "various races and colors", the violence continued. It culminated in the commandeering of automatic weapons and trucks by 43 African American sailors in the short-lived Agana race riot, prompting their arrest by Marine military police and sentencing of up to four years in prison each. The men eventually obtained their freedom after Walter Francis White, an NAACP leader, advocated for them by claiming the situation was created by discrimination toward the men mixed with poor leadership in their unit.

During the war, he commanded over 215,000 personnel on the island and oversaw the development of the island into a major air and sea military base in the single largest construction project in the history of the United States Navy. By the time the war ended, the island contained five air bases and eight air strips, from which many planes made bombing runs on the Japanese mainland. The medical facilities on the island were also revamped, and many of the wounded from engagements like the Battle of Iwo Jima were routed through Guam before returning home. Larsen planned to convert the heavily damaged capital of Agana into a more modern American city with a grid plan similar to Santa Monica, California, but never achieved his "New Agana". Larsen contended that these improvements also provided easily discernible living condition improvements for the native Chamorro people of the island.

== Post-military career ==
After Larsen retired from the Marine Corps, Governor of Colorado Daniel I.J. Thornton appointed him Colorado Civilian Defense Director, a position he held from 1949 through 1959. Larsen also served as the president of the National Association of State Civil Defense Directors. He used the position to advocate for greater civil defense spending, accusing President Harry Truman of neglecting to fully prepare the nation for war should it come again.

== Decorations ==
Lieutenant General Larsen's ribbon bar:

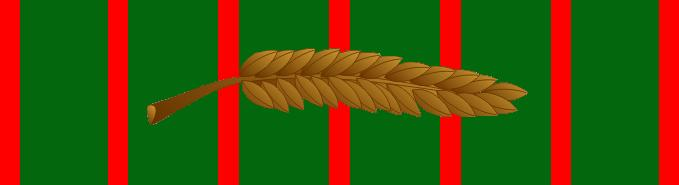

1st Row	Navy Cross with Gold Star		Navy Distinguished Service Medal with Gold Star	Silver Star with two Gold Stars	Fourragère
2nd Row	Legion of Merit with Gold Star	Bronze Star Medal	Navy Commendation Medal	Marine Corps Expeditionary Medal with three service stars	Fourragère
3rd Row	Mexican Service Medal	Dominican Campaign Medal	World War I Victory Medal with four battle clasps	Army of Occupation of Germany Medal	Fourragère
4th Row	Nicaraguan Campaign Medal (1933)	American Defense Service Medal	American Campaign Medal	Asiatic-Pacific Campaign Medal with one service star	Fourragère
5th Row	World War II Victory Medal	Chevalier of the Legion of Honour	French Croix de guerre 1914–1918 with Palm	Nicaraguan Medal of Merit with Silver star	Fourragère

=== First Navy Cross citation ===
Citation:

The President of the United States of America takes pleasure in presenting the Navy Cross to Major Henry L. Larsen (MCSN: 0-540), United States Marine Corps, for exceptionally meritorious and distinguished service as Battalion Commander, Third Battalion, 5th Regiment Marines. On 4 October 1918, Major Larsen's battalion was leading in the attack made by the Fifth Marines, while operating with the 4th French Army, east of Rheims. The French troops on his left not being advanced, and the Brigade on his right being somewhat in rear of the advance, his battalion had both flanks exposed. In spite of this, his coolness and personal bravery enabled him to hold on to the ground gained. The Germans repeatedly counter-attacked, in one instance directly from his left rear, and his position throughout the whole day was under a most severe artillery and machine-gun fire. Major Larsen constantly visited the most exposed parts of his lines and encouraged his men by his inspiring example.

=== Second Navy Cross citation ===
Citation:

The President of the United States of America takes pleasure in presenting a Gold Star in lieu of a Second Award of the Navy Cross to Major Henry L. Larsen (MCSN: 0-540), United States Marine Corps, for distinguished service in the line of his profession as Brigade Inspector, Second Brigade, U.S. Marine Corps, in Nicaragua from 1 April 1928 to 26 March 1929. Major Larsen's duties in upbuilding and maintaining the morale of the forces, then engaged in a most difficult mission, were performed in a highly distinguished manner, always displaying zeal, activity, thorough understanding and discretion. His successful performance of these duties contributed greatly to the accomplishment of the mission of the naval forces engaged in the pacification of Nicaragua.

== Personal life ==
On November 25, 1913, Larsen married Elizabeth Ammons, daughter of Elias M. Ammons, who served as governor of Colorado, in Denver, Colorado.

On October 2, 1962, Larsen died of a heart attack at his home in Denver, Colorado.

Larsen is interred with his wife Elizabeth Ammons Larsen (1893–1990) at Arlington National Cemetery.

Military offices
Preceded by Earl C. Long	Commanding General of the Department of the Pacific; May 1946 - September 1946	Succeeded by Keller E. Rockey
Preceded by Roy Geiger	Military Governor of Guam; August 15, 1944 – May 30, 1946	Succeeded by Charles Alan Pownall
