= 1938 Colorado gubernatorial election =

- November 8, 1938
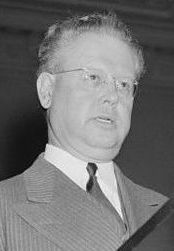

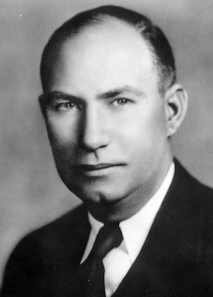
Nominee	Ralph Lawrence Carr	Teller Ammons
Party	Republican	Democratic
Popular vote	255,159	199,562
Percentage	55.82%	43.66%
- County results Carr: 50–60% 60–70% 70–80% Ammons: 40–50% 50–60%
Governor before election
Teller Ammons
Democratic
Elected Governor
Ralph Lawrence Carr
Republican

The 1938 Colorado gubernatorial election was held on November 8, 1938. Republican nominee Ralph Lawrence Carr defeated Democratic incumbent Teller Ammons with 55.82% of the vote.

== Democratic primary ==
=== Candidates ===
- Teller Ammons, incumbent Governor of Colorado
- George J. Knapp, Pueblo newspaper publisher

==== Dropped out ====
- Elmer E. Headlee, State Senator from Monte Vista

=== Campaign ===
First-term Democratic Governor Teller Ammons ran for re-election and faced uncertain opposition in the Democratic primary. He initially faced a primary challenge from conservative State Senator Elmer E. Headlee, who represented the San Luis Valley. However, at the state Democratic convention, Headlee ended his campaign, apparently concerned that he lacked enough votes to continue his campaign to the primary election. Accordingly, Ammons was nominated without opposition. Prior to the primary, however, Pueblo newspaper editor George J. Knapp, who had previously run for Congress as a Republican in 1936, gathered enough signatures to challenge Ammons for renomination. Despite being entirely unknown, Knapp held Ammons to just 62% of the vote, winning several counties through the state and triggering speculation as to the nature of Ammons's weak performance.

=== Results ===
Democratic primary results
Party	Candidate	Votes	%
Democratic	Teller Ammons (inc.)	67,992	62.41
Democratic	George J. Knapp	40,948	37.59
Total votes		108,940	100.00

== Republican primary ==
=== Candidates ===
- Ralph Lawrence Carr, former United States Attorney for the District of Colorado

==== Dropped out ====
- Charles M. Armstrong, former Colorado State Treasurer, 1936 Republican nominee for Governor
- Benjamin Snodgrass, Denver coal operator

=== Campaign ===
In the leadup to the state Republican convention, the two frontrunners for the nomination for Governor appeared to be former State Treasurer Charles M. Armstrong, who had run unsuccessfully as the party's nominee in 1936, and coal operator Benjamin Snodgrass, who was supported by former Senator Lawrence C. Phipps and his allies. However, party leaders were angling for a third candidate and considered former State Senator Nate C. Warren, Colorado Springs Mayor George Birdsall, and former U.S. Attorney Ralph Carr. All alternative candidacies were declined or scuttled, but Carr ultimately changed his mind and sought the nomination. In the face of the unified front in favor of Carr, Armstrong withdrew at the convention. And though Snodgrass won enough votes to secure a place on the primary election ballot, he ultimately withdrew from the race as well, allowing Carr to be nominated unopposed.

=== Results ===
Republican primary results
Party	Candidate	Votes	%
Republican	Ralph L. Carr	61,724	100.00
Total votes		61,724	100.00

== General election ==
=== Results ===
1938 Colorado gubernatorial election
Party	Candidate	Votes	%	±%
Republican	Ralph L. Carr	255,159	55.82%	+12.17%
Democratic	Teller Ammons (inc.)	199,562	43.66%	−10.91%
Union	Jack R. White	1,262	0.28%	+0.11%
Royal Way	Harvey L. Mayfield	1,140	0.25%	+0.21%
Majority		55,597	12.16%	+1.24%
Turnout		457,123		
Republican gain from Democratic				
