= Elizabeth Ammons Larsen =

American First Lady of American Samoa and First Lady of Guam

First Lady of American Samoa
- In role January 12, 1942 – April 25, 1942
- Governor: Henry Louis Larsen

First Lady of Guam
- In role August 15, 1944 – May 30, 1946
- Governor: Henry Louis Larsen

Personal details
- Born: December 6, 1893 Denver, Colorado, US
- Died: July 23, 1990 (aged 96) Denver, Colorado, US
- Spouse: Henry Louis Larsen
- Parents: Elias M. Ammons (father); Elizabeth Fleming Ammons (mother)
- Relatives: Teller Ammons (brother)
- Education: Colorado Women's College
- Occupation: First Lady of American Samoa, First Lady of Guam

Elizabeth Ammons Larsen was an American equestrienne who served as the First Lady of American Samoa and First Lady of Guam.

== Early life ==
On December 6, 1893, Larsen was born as Elizabeth Ammons in Denver, Colorado. Larsen's father was Elias M. Ammons, a Governor of Colorado. Larsen's mother was Elizabeth Fleming Ammons. Larsen attended Wolcott School, a school established by Anna Wolcott Vaile in 1898.

== Education ==
Ammons earned a degree from Colorado Women's College. Ammons attended University of Colorado and took courses in journalism.

== Career ==
In Colorado, Larsen became an accomplished equestrienne.

In 1942, when Henry Louis Larsen was appointed by President Franklin D. Roosevelt as the first Military Governor of American Samoa, Larsen became the First Lady of American Samoa on January 12, 1942, until April 25, 1942.

In 1944, when Henry Louis Larsen became the military Governor of Guam, Larsen became the First Lady of Guam on August 15, 1944, until May 30, 1946.

== Personal life ==
On Nov. 25, 1913, Larsen married Henry Louis Larsen, who later became a United States Marine Corps Lieutenant General and a military Governor of Guam. On October 2, 1962, Larsen's husband died of a heart attack in Denver, Colorado. On July 23, 1990, Larsen died in Denver, Colorado. Larsen is interred at Arlington National Cemetery in Arlington County, Virginia.
