= Salina Normal University =

University in Kansas

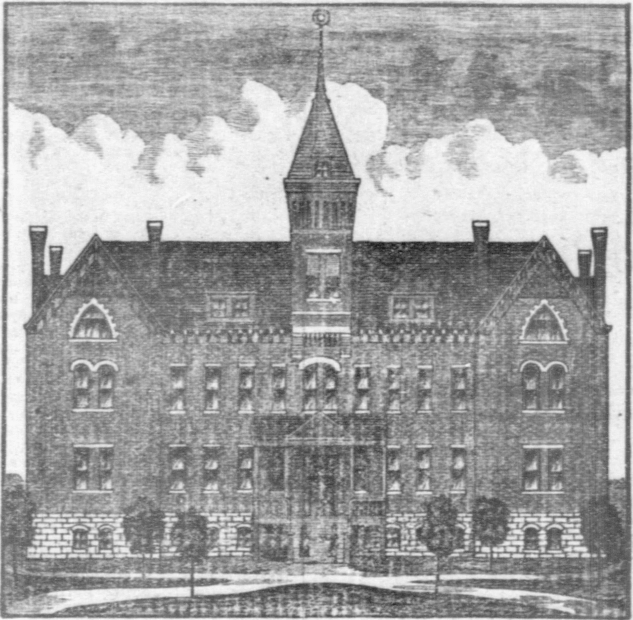
- Motto: Study first, outside issues afterwards.
- Type: Normal university
- Active: 1884–1904 (destroyed by a fire)
- Students: 125-700
- Location: Salina, Kansas, United States of America

Salina Normal University, sometimes called Salina Normal College, was an independent coeducational normal school established in 1884 in Salina, Kansas, United States. It offered collegiate, normal, business, science, and fine arts courses.

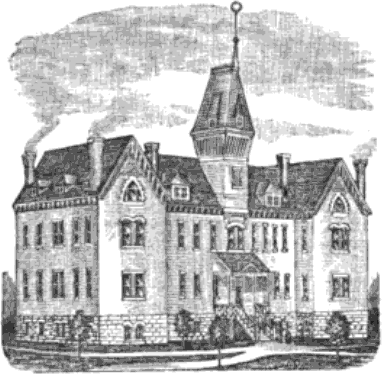
A partial side view of the Salina Normal University.

The university's first proprietor was Alexander Hopkins, who closed his East Illinois College in Danville, Illinois and brought some students and faculty with him. A building was constructed on College Street, at the western end of Iron Avenue, and the college opened on Tuesday, 2 September 1884, with a record-breaking initial enrollment for a Normal School of 60. The building had 57 rooms, cost a total of $40,000 to build, and the ground floor measured 100 by 65 feet. It had two wings: a dormitory wing, able to house 60–75 students, and the college wing, able to accommodate 500–600 students. The campus grounds occupied six acres, while the surrounding 53 acres were owned by the college stock company and sold in platted parcels.

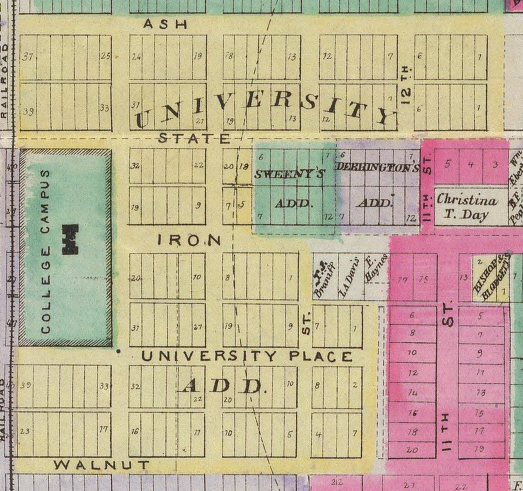
Salina Normal University, its college campus and the city's University Addition, in 1887.

Attendance in the first year reached 125, but at mid-year many students and faculty became dissatisfied and ownership of the institution was transferred to J. Walter Fertig and L.O. Thoroman, with the latter becoming president. A prominent Salinan, Oscar Seitz, also served as president of the university in the 1880s while simultaneously managing the streetcar company. In 1884–85 the college library had approximately 1,000 books, the only library in Salina listed in the U.S. Office of Education 1886 survey of public libraries. By 1893, despite a lack of financial backing, annual enrollment was almost 700.

The university was destroyed by fire on 4 September 1904, and not rebuilt. At that time it had 400 students. The Salina Journal gave the following account of the fire:

Carl Gunter, Charles Ruppenthal and a new student named Atkins were asleep on the second floor. Gunter, who had not retired but had fallen asleep reading, was aroused by the noise of the fire. Mr. Wilbur, the janitor, and his sons, asleep in the basement, escaped as the roof fell in. Those on the second floor, cut off from the stairways by flames, crawled through windows and dropped to the ground. When the fire department arrived, flames were issuing from the roof. Firemen used three streams of water in fighting the blaze, but succeeded only in saving the walls.

== Notable students ==
- John R. Connelly, Congressman from Kansas
- Frank M. Cron, State Legislator from Kansas
- Oscar Stanton De Priest, Congressman from Illinois
- Dean M. Gillespie, Congressman from Colorado
- Thomas H. McKay, State Legislator from Washington
- W.D. Struble, Assistant State Superintendent of Education, Kansas
- Joseph Taggart, Congressman from Kansas
