= 1954 United States Senate election in Colorado =

- November 2, 1954
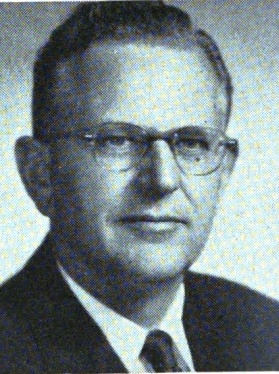

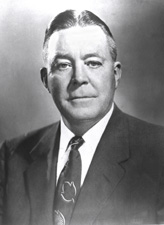
Nominee	Gordon Allott	John A. Carroll
Party	Republican	Democratic
Popular vote	248,502	235,686
Percentage	51.32%	48.68%
- County results Allott: 50–60% 60–70% Carroll: 50–60% 60–70%
U.S. senator before election
Edwin C. Johnson
Democratic
Elected U.S. Senator
Gordon Allott
Republican

The 1954 United States Senate election in Colorado took place on November 2, 1954. Incumbent Democratic Senator Edwin C. Johnson did not run for re-election, instead he gave up his seat to run for Governor again. Republican Lieutenant Governor Gordon Allott defeated Democratic U.S. Representative John A. Carroll in the race for the open seat.

== Democratic primary ==
=== Candidates ===
- John A. Carroll, former U.S. Representative from Denver
- J. Quigg Newton, Mayor of Denver

=== Results ===
1954 U.S. Senate Democratic primary
Party	Candidate	Votes	%
Democratic	John A. Carroll	82,360	60.19%
Democratic	J. Quigg Newton	54,467	39.81%
Total votes		136,827	100.00%

== General election ==
=== Results ===
General election results
Party	Candidate	Votes	%	±%
Republican	Gordon Allott	248,502	51.32%	▲18.96
Democratic	John A. Carroll	235,686	48.68%	▼18.11
Total votes		484,188	100.00%	

== See also ==
- 1954 United States Senate elections
