= Peter H. Dominick =

American politician (1915–1981)

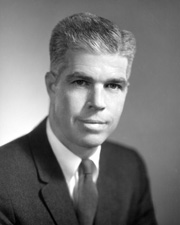

United States Ambassador to Switzerland
- In office April 25, 1975 – July 10, 1975
- President: Gerald Ford
- Preceded by: Shelby Cullom Davis
- Succeeded by: Nathaniel Davis

United States Senator from Colorado
- In office January 3, 1963 – January 3, 1975
- Preceded by: John A. Carroll
- Succeeded by: Gary Hart

Member of the U.S. House of Representatives from Colorado's 2nd district
- In office January 3, 1961 – January 3, 1963
- Preceded by: Byron Johnson
- Succeeded by: Donald Brotzman

Personal details
- Born: Peter Hoyt Dominick; July 7, 1915 Stamford, Connecticut, U.S.
- Died: March 18, 1981 (aged 65) Hobe Sound, Florida, U.S.
- Resting place: Fairmount Cemetery, Denver
- Party: Republican
- Education: Yale University (BA, LLB)

Military service
- Allegiance: United States
- Branch/service: United States Army
- Years of service: 1942–1945
- Rank: Captain
- Unit: United States Army Air Corps
- Battles/wars: World War II

Peter Hoyt Dominick (July 7, 1915 – March 18, 1981) was an American World War II veteran, diplomat, politician and lawyer from Colorado. A member of the Republican Party, he served in the United States Senate from 1963 to 1975. His uncle, Howard Alexander Smith, was a U.S. senator from New Jersey from 1944 to 1959.

== Life and career ==
Born in Stamford, Connecticut on July 7, 1915, Dominick graduated from St. Mark's School in 1933, from Yale University in 1937 as a member of Scroll and Key, and Yale Law School in 1940.

=== Law practice ===
He practiced law in New York City with the law firm Carter, Ledyard and Milburn from 1940 until 1942.

Dominick then joined the United States Army Air Corps as an aviation cadet at the outset of American fighting in World War II. He served until his separation from military service in 1945, as a captain.

He briefly recommenced his legal practice in New York City in 1946, before moving that same year to Denver, Colorado, where he continued to practice law, eventually becoming a founding partner of the law firm Holland & Hart.

=== Colorado House of Representative ===
Dominick entered politics when he was elected as a Republican to the Colorado House of Representatives, where he served from 1957 to 1961.

=== Congress ===
In 1960, he made a successful run for the United States House of Representatives, defeating incumbent freshman Democrat Byron L. Johnson, and he abandoned his law career in 1961.

After a single term in the House of Representatives, Dominick was elected to the United States Senate, defeating one-term incumbent Democrat John A. Carroll, 53.6% to 45.6%. He was reelected in 1968 over Stephen L. R. McNichols, a former governor of Colorado, 58.6% to 41.5%. Dominick voted in favor of the Civil Rights Acts of 1964 and 1968, as well as the Voting Rights Act of 1965 and the confirmation of Thurgood Marshall to the U.S. Supreme Court. Dominick was also a supporter of major environmental legislation, supporting the enactment of the Wilderness Act in 1964, the National Environmental Policy Act in 1969, the Clean Air Act of 1970, the Clean Water Act of 1972, and the Endangered Species Act of 1973.

Senator Dominick served as chairman of the National Republican Senatorial Committee in the 92nd Congress from 1971 to 1973. In a good election year for Democrats, Dominick was defeated for a third term in 1974 by Gary Hart, 57.2% to 39.5%. By then Dominick was suffering from multiple sclerosis.

He also didn't help his case by saying, when asked a question about the value of U.N. Food Programs to certain countries, that Ugandans "would rather eat the people than the food", and by calling Watergate "insignificant."

=== Ambassador ===
After leaving the Senate at the end of his term in 1975, he was appointed Ambassador to Switzerland by President Gerald Ford, but served only briefly.

=== Retirement and death ===
He resided in Cherry Hills Village, Colorado until his death at Hobe Sound, Florida, on March 18, 1981. Senator Dominick's body was interred in Fairmount Cemetery, Denver.

== Legacy ==
Already a competent pilot, Peter Dominick solicited service with the US Army Air Corps on December 9, 1941. Unbeknownst to his family, Dominick had kept a meticulous journal of the entirety of his service during the war. Chronicling his flying "The Hump", the journal was discovered by his children and published by youngest son, Alexander Dominick, in 2018.

U.S. House of Representatives
Preceded by Byron L. Johnson	Member of the U.S. House of Representatives from Colorado's 2nd congressional district 1961–1963	Succeeded by Donald G. Brotzman
Party political offices
Preceded by Daniel I.J. Thornton	Republican nominee for U.S. Senator from Colorado (Class 3); 1962, 1968, 1974	Succeeded by Mary Estill Buchanan
Preceded by Everett Dirksen; Gerald Ford	Response to the State of the Union address 1968; Served alongside: Howard Baker, George H. W. Bush, Gerald Ford, Robert Griffin, Mel Laird, Bob Mathias, George Murphy, Chuck Percy, Dick Poff, Al Quie, Charlotte Reid, Hugh Scott, Bill Steiger, John Tower	Vacant Title next held by Donald Fraser, Scoop Jackson, Mike Mansfield, John McCormack, Patsy Mink, Ed Muskie, Bill Proxmire
Preceded by John Tower	Chair of the National Republican Senatorial Committee; 1971–1973	Succeeded by Bill Brock
U.S. Senate
Preceded by John A. Carroll	U.S. Senator (Class 3) from Colorado; 1963–1975; Served alongside: Gordon L. Allott, Floyd K. Haskell	Succeeded by Gary Hart
New office	Ranking Member of the Senate Budget Committee; 1974–1975	Succeeded by Henry Bellmon
Diplomatic posts
Preceded by Shelby Cullom Davis	United States Ambassador to Switzerland; 1975	Succeeded by Nathaniel Davis
