= Roy H. McVicker =

American politician

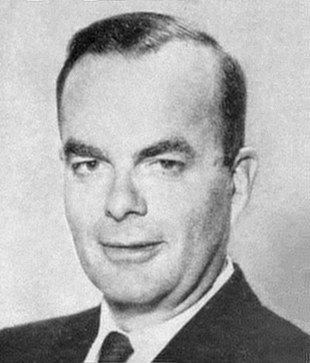

Member of the U.S. House of Representatives from Colorado's 2nd district
- In office January 3, 1965 – January 3, 1967
- Preceded by: Donald G. Brotzman
- Succeeded by: Donald G. Brotzman

Personal details
- Born: Roy Harrison McVicker; February 20, 1924 Edgewater, Colorado
- Died: September 15, 1973 (aged 49)
- Party: Democratic

Roy Harrison McVicker (February 20, 1924 – September 15, 1973) was an American lawyer and World War II veteran who served one term as a U.S. representative from Colorado from 1965 to 1967.

== Early life and education ==
Born in Edgewater, Colorado, his parents were Reverend and Mrs. Roy H. McVicker. McVicker was educated at South Denver High School, University of Denver, Columbia College, and graduated from Columbia Law School in 1950. He was a lay preacher in the Methodist Church beginning at eighteen years of age.

== World War II ==
During the Second World War, he served in the United States Navy in the Southwest Pacific.

== Career ==
McVicker served as assistant professor in psychology at Colorado State College in 1946 and 1947. He worked under President Harry Truman in establishment of the Admiral Nimitz Commission on Internal Security and Civil Rights in 1950 and 1951.

He was admitted to the bar in New York in 1950, and practiced law in Wheat Ridge, Colorado from 1953 to 1964.

He served as member of the State senate from 1956 to 1964.

=== Congress ===
McVicker was narrowly elected as a Democrat to the Eighty-ninth Congress (January 3, 1965 – January 3, 1967). He was unsuccessful for re-election in 1966 and for election to his old seat in 1968.

=== Later career ===
He was a contract consultant for the Agency for International Development in Denver in 1967. Afterward, he resumed the practice of law.

== Personal life ==
He married Harriet Ripley and they had one child together, Elizabeth Ruth McVicker. He adopted Harriet’s children from a previous marriage, William and Theresa. They divorced in 1968. Both Harriet and Roy remarried. He married Mary C. Kempter and they remained together until his death.

=== Death and legacy ===
He died of amyotrophic lateral sclerosis (ALS, a.k.a. Lou Gehrig's disease) at his home in Westminster, Colorado on September 15, 1973. Documents from the Boulder Daily Camera are stored at the Carnegie Library in Boulder.

U.S. House of Representatives
Preceded by Don Brotzman	Member of the U.S. House of Representatives from Colorado's 2nd congressional district January 3, 1965 - January 3, 1967	Succeeded by Don Brotzman
