= Dean M. Gillespie =

American politician (1884–1949)

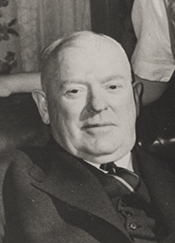

Member of the U.S. House of Representatives from Colorado's 1st district
- In office March 7, 1944 – January 3, 1947
- Preceded by: Lawrence Lewis
- Succeeded by: John A. Carroll

Personal details
- Born: Dean Milton Gillespie; May 3, 1884 Salina, Kansas, U.S.
- Died: February 2, 1949 (aged 64) Baltimore, Maryland, U.S.
- Committees: Appropriations, Treasury, Post Office, State, Justice, and Commerce.

Dean Milton Gillespie (May 3, 1884 – February 2, 1949) was an American businessman and politician who served as a U.S. representative from Colorado from 1944 to 1947.

== Early life and education ==
Born in Salina, Kansas, the youngest son of Dr. D. M. Gillespie and Mrs. D. M. Gillespie of Blaine Township, Clay County, Kansas. His father has been a pioneer of Kansas and was a physician. He also published a temperance newspaper entitled, The Rising Sun.

Gillespie attended the public schools and Salina Normal University. He engaged in agricultural pursuits and cattle raising in Clay County, Kansas, from 1900 to 1904.

== Career ==
He moved to Denver, Colorado, in 1905 and worked as grocery clerk, sign painter, and salesman. He engaged in the automobile and oil business since 1905. Gillespie founded Power Equipment Company and incorporated under the corporate laws of Colorado on September 14, 1936. Operations were initially conducted through two affiliated corporations, Power Equipment Co. and Dean Gillespie & Co., which firms controlled the franchises for Allis-Chalmers Construction Equipment and White Motor trucks.

Gillespie was elected as a Republican to the 78th Congress to fill the vacancy caused by the death of Lawrence Lewis, reelected to the 79th Congress, and served from March 7, 1944, to January 3, 1947. He was an unsuccessful candidate for reelection in 1946 to the 80th Congress.

He then returned to his former business pursuits. He was president of Dean Gillespie & Company, president of Motoroyal Oil Company, and vice president of BluHill Food Corporation. He was an Elk, Mason, Shriner and a member of a number organizations.

== Personal life ==
He married Lillie Baldwin on January 29, 1908, in Golden, Colorado. They had two daughters. One of his daughters, Ruth Gillespie, was an attorney in Denver. Lillie died in 1941.

He had the world's largest collection of meteorites and often gave talks about meteorites.

=== Death and burial ===
He checked himself into Johns Hopkins Hospital while on a business trip and died of a heart attack on February 2, 1949, in Baltimore, Maryland. He was interred in Fairmount Cemetery, Denver, Colorado.

== Electoral history ==
1944 United States House of Representatives special election, Colorado's 1st district
Party	Candidate	Votes	%
Republican	Dean M. Gillespie	41,319	51.55%
Democratic	Carl E. Wuertele	38,394	47.90%
Socialist	Edgar P. Sherman	230	0.29%
Independent	George M. Phillips	160	0.20%
Liberal	Frank H. Rice	51	0.06%
Majority		2,925	3.65%
Total votes		80,154	100%
Republican gain from Democratic			

1944 United States House of Representatives elections, Colorado's 1st district (general)
Party	Candidate	Votes	%
Republican	Dean M. Gillespie (incumbent)	90,151	51.75%
Democratic	Charles A. Graham	83,253	47.79%
Socialist	Edgar P. Sherman	798	0.46%
Majority		6,898	3.96%
Total votes		174,202	100%
Republican hold			

1946 United States House of Representatives elections, Colorado's 1st district
Party	Candidate	Votes	%
Democratic	John A. Carroll	60,513	51.75%
Republican	Dean M. Gillespie (incumbent)	55,724	47.66%
Socialist	Edgar P. Sherman	691	0.59%
Majority		4,789	4.09%
Total votes		116,928	100%
Democratic gain from Republican			

U.S. House of Representatives
Preceded by Lawrence Lewis	Member of the U.S. House of Representatives from Colorado's 1st congressional district March 7, 1944 - January 3, 1947	Succeeded by John A. Carroll
