= Will Nicholson =

American politician (1900–1975)

37th Mayor of Denver
- In office 1955–1959
- Preceded by: J. Quigg Newton
- Succeeded by: Richard Batterton

Personal details
- Born: September 12, 1900 Aurora, Illinois, U.S.
- Died: January 1975 (aged 74) Colorado, U.S.

Will Faust Nicholson (September 12, 1900 – January 1975) was an American politician who served as the mayor of Denver, Colorado from 1955 to 1959.

Party political offices
Preceded by Ralph Lawrence Carr	Republican nominee for U.S. Senator from Colorado (Class 2); 1948	Succeeded by Gordon Allott
