= 1948 United States Senate election in Colorado =

- November 2, 1948
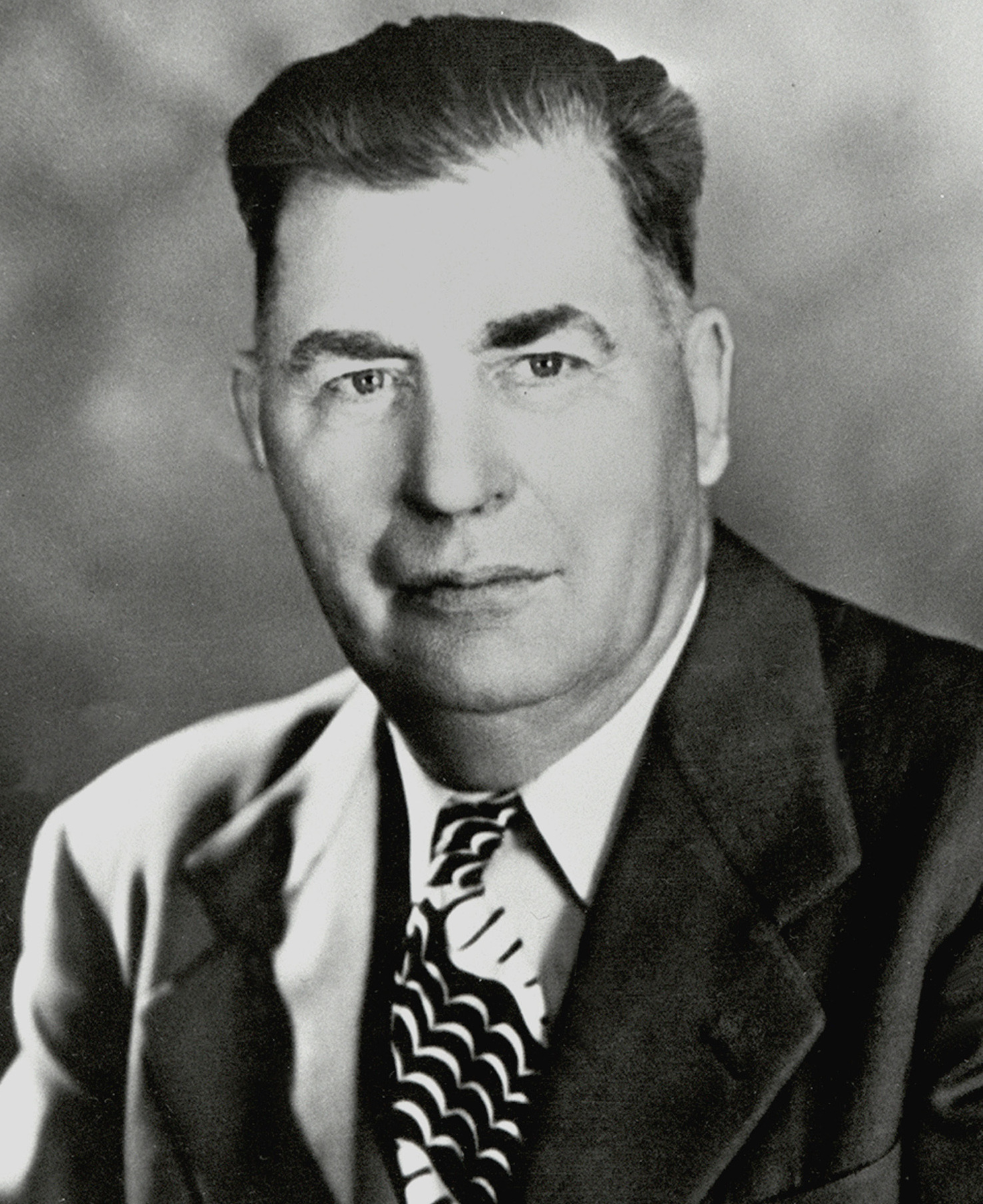

Nominee	Ed Johnson	Will Nicholson
Party	Democratic	Republican
Popular vote	340,719	165,059
Percentage	66.79%	32.36%
- County results Johnson: 50–60% 60–70% 70–80%
U.S. senator before election
Edwin C. Johnson
Democratic
Elected U.S. Senator
Edwin C. Johnson
Democratic

The 1948 United States Senate election in Colorado took place on November 2, 1948. Incumbent Democratic Senator Edwin C. Johnson was re-elected to third term in a landslide over Republican Will Nicholson, a businessman and Air Force veteran, winning every county in the state.

Johnson outperformed fellow Democrat Harry S. Truman in the concurrent presidential election by 29%.

== Democratic primary ==
=== Candidates ===
- Eugene Cervi, newspaperman and Chairman of the Colorado Democratic Party
- Edwin C. Johnson, incumbent Senator since 1933

=== Results ===
1948 U.S. Senate Democratic primary
Party	Candidate	Votes	%
Democratic	Edwin C. Johnson (incumbent)	84,919	71.86%
Democratic	Eugene Cervi	33,262	28.15%
Total votes		118,181	100.00%

== Republican primary ==
=== Candidates ===
- Will Nicholson, owner of the Denver Bears and Air Force veteran
- John C. Vivian, former Governor of Colorado from 1943 to 1947

=== Results ===
1948 U.S. Senate Republican primary
Party	Candidate	Votes	%
Republican	Will Nicholson	48,716	53.09%
Republican	John C. Vivian	43,052	46.91%
Total votes		91,768	100.00%

== General election ==
=== Results ===
General election results
Party	Candidate	Votes	%	±%
Democratic	Edwin C. Johnson (inc.)	340,719	66.79%	▲16.56
Republican	Will Nicholson	165,059	32.36%	▼16.83
Progressive	John Gurule	2,981	0.58%	N/A
Socialist	Carle Whitehead	1,352	0.27%	▼0.13
Total votes		510,111	100.00%	

== See also ==
- 1948 United States Senate elections
