= Donald G. Brotzman =

American politician (1922–2004)

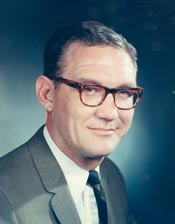

Member of the U.S. House of Representatives from Colorado's 2nd district
- In office January 3, 1963 – January 3, 1965
- Preceded by: Peter H. Dominick
- Succeeded by: Roy H. McVicker
- In office January 3, 1967 – January 3, 1975
- Preceded by: Roy H. McVicker
- Succeeded by: Tim Wirth

Member of the Colorado Senate
- In office 1954–1956

Member of the Colorado House of Representatives
- In office 1952–1954

Personal details
- Born: Donald Glenn Brotzman; June 28, 1922 Sterling, Colorado, U.S.
- Died: September 15, 2004 (aged 82) Alexandria, Virginia, U.S.
- Party: Republican
- Spouse: Louise
- Education: University of Colorado at Boulder; University of Colorado Law School
- Occupation: Attorney

Donald Glenn Brotzman (June 28, 1922 – September 15, 2004) was a U.S. representative from Colorado. As of 2025, he remains the last Republican to have represented Colorado's 2nd congressional district in the U.S. House of Representatives.

== History ==
Brotzman was born on a farm in near Sterling, Colorado in Logan County to Priscella Ruth Kittle Smith (1895–1986) and Harry Brotzman (1895–1959). He was educated in Logan County schools. He married Louise L. Reed on April 9, 1944. He served in the United States Army as a first lieutenant with the Eighty-first Infantry Division in the South Pacific from 1945 to 1946.

Brotzman graduated from the Business School of the University of Colorado at Boulder in 1949; it has since been renamed the Leeds School of Business. He graduated from the University of Colorado Law School in 1949. He was admitted to the bar in 1950 and began practice in Boulder, Colorado.

He served as member of the Colorado House of Representatives from 1952 to 1954. He served as member of the Colorado Senate from 1954 to 1956, serving as Republican caucus leader in 1956. He was the Republican gubernatorial nominee in 1954 and 1956. He was appointed United States Attorney for Colorado by President Eisenhower and served from 1959 to 1961.

Brotzman was elected as a Republican to the Eighty-eighth Congress (January 3, 1963 – January 3, 1965). He was an unsuccessful nominee in 1964 to the Eighty-ninth Congress. He was elected to the Ninetieth and to the three succeeding Congresses (January 3, 1967 – January 3, 1975). He was an unsuccessful candidate for reelection to the Ninety-fourth Congress in 1974. Brotzman voted in favor of the Civil Rights Acts of 1964 and 1968.

Brotzman served as Assistant Secretary of the Army for Manpower and Reserve Affairs from 1975 to 1977. He also served as president of Rubber Manufacturers Association and National Rubber Shippers Association, and as chairman of the Industry Safety Council in Washington, D.C.

His wife of 51 years, Louise Reed Brotzman, died in 1995.

Brotzman died of cancer September 15, 2004, at the Fountains at Washington House, a nursing home in Alexandria, Virginia. He lived in Alexandria.

Survivors included his wife, Gwendolyn Davis Brotzman of Alexandria, whom he married in 1996; two children from his first marriage, Kathleen "Kathy" Caldwell of Longmont, Colo., and Donald G. "Chip" Brotzman Jr. of Carbondale, Colo.; a stepson, Robert Higgins of Philippi, W.Va.; a brother; and six grandchildren.

Party political offices
Preceded by Daniel I. J. Thornton	Republican nominee for Governor of Colorado; 1954, 1956	Succeeded by Palmer Burch
U.S. House of Representatives
Preceded by Peter H. Dominick	Member of the U.S. House of Representatives from Colorado's 2nd congressional district January 3, 1963 – January 3, 1965	Succeeded by Roy H. McVicker
U.S. House of Representatives
Preceded by Roy H. McVicker	Member of the U.S. House of Representatives from Colorado's 2nd congressional district January 3, 1967 – January 3, 1975	Succeeded by Tim Wirth
