= 1942 United States Senate election in Colorado =

- November 3, 1942
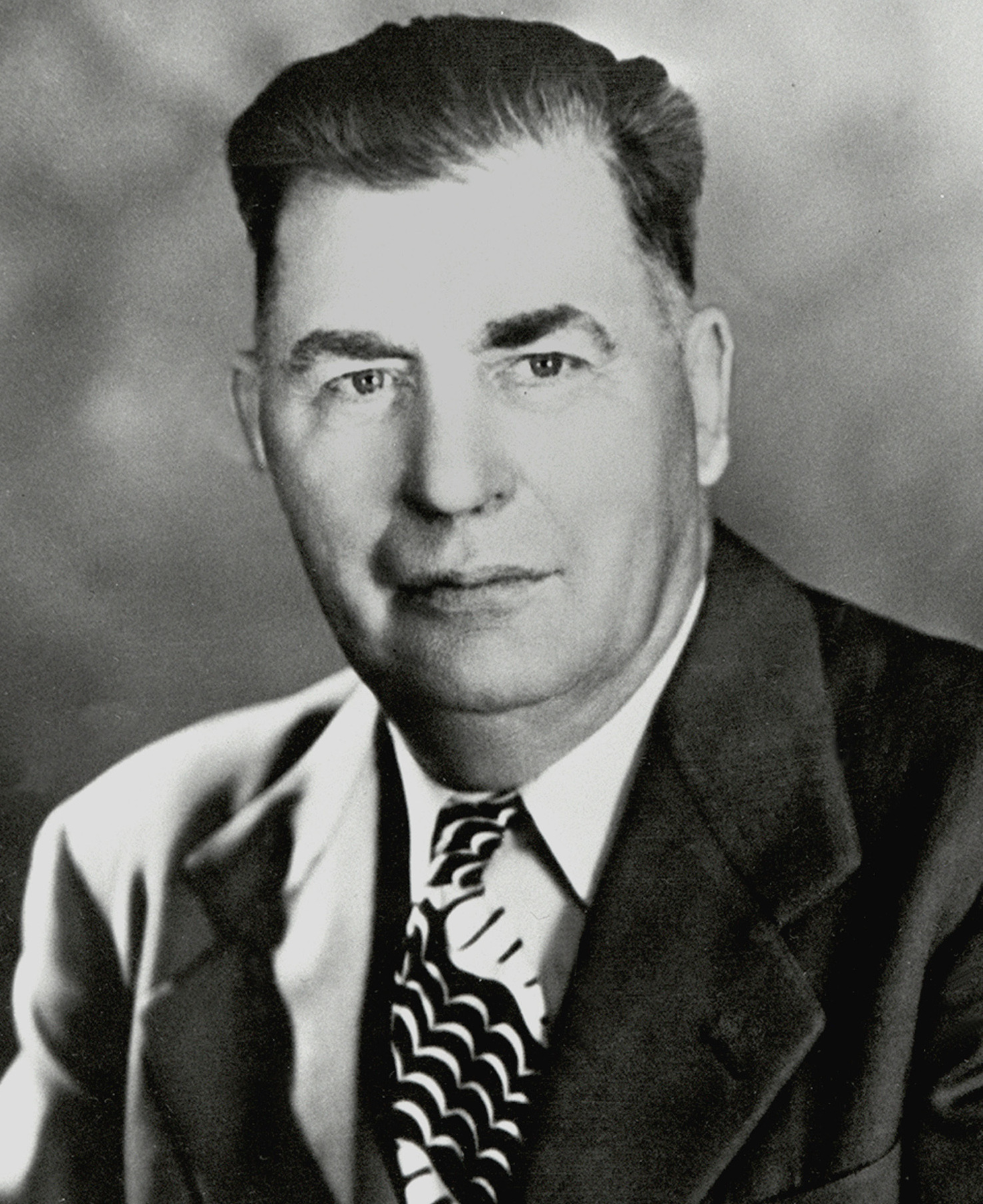

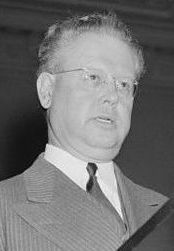
Nominee	Ed Johnson	Ralph L. Carr
Party	Democratic	Republican
Popular vote	174,612	170,970
Percentage	50.23%	49.19%
- County results Johnson: 40–50% 50–60% 60–70% Carr: 50–60% 60–70%
U.S. senator before election
Edwin C. Johnson
Democratic
Elected U.S. Senator
Edwin C. Johnson
Democratic

The 1942 United States Senate election in Colorado took place on November 3, 1942. Incumbent Democratic Senator Edwin C. Johnson was re-elected to second term over Republican Governor Ralph L. Carr. The major issue in this race was Carr's dual ambitions for both Senate seats. As Governor, he appointed Eugene Milliken following the death of Senator Alva B. Adams and then wanted to get elected himself over Senator Johnson. Carr's efforts resulted in Milliken winning the special election, but Carr himself was unsuccessful at getting elected. Senator Johnson won a narrow victory and remained in the Senate.

== Democratic primary ==
=== Candidates ===
- Benjamin Hilliard, Justice of the Colorado Supreme Court and former U.S. Representative
- Edwin C. Johnson, incumbent Senator since 1937

=== Results ===
1942 Democratic U.S. Senate primary
Party	Candidate	Votes	%
Democratic	Edwin C. Johnson (incumbent)	41,080	61.99%
Democratic	Benjamin Hilliard	25,187	38.01%
Total votes		66,267	100.00%

== Republican primary ==
=== Candidates ===
- Ralph L. Carr, Governor of Colorado

=== Results ===
Carr was unopposed for the Republican nomination.

1942 Republican U.S. Senate primary
Party	Candidate	Votes	%
Republican	Ralph L. Carr	44,683	100.00%
Total votes		44,683	100.00%

== General election ==
=== Candidates ===
- James Allander (Communist)
- Ralph L. Carr, Governor of Colorado (Republican)
- Edwin C. Johnson, incumbent Senator since 1937 (Democratic)
- Carle Whitehead (Socialist)

=== Results ===
General election results
Party	Candidate	Votes	%	±%
Democratic	Edwin C. Johnson (incumbent)	174,612	50.23%	▼13.22
Republican	Ralph L. Carr	170,970	49.19%	▲13.94
Socialist	Carle Whitehead	1,387	0.40%	▼0.54
Communist	James Allander	627	0.27%	N/A
Total votes		347,596	100.00%	

== See also ==
- 1942 United States Senate elections
