= John A. Carroll =

American politician (1901–1983)

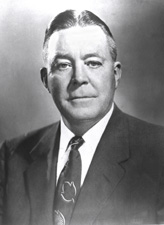

United States Senator from Colorado
- In office January 3, 1957 – January 3, 1963
- Preceded by: Eugene Millikin
- Succeeded by: Peter H. Dominick

Member of the U.S. House of Representatives from Colorado's 1st district
- In office January 3, 1947 – January 3, 1951
- Preceded by: Dean M. Gillespie
- Succeeded by: Byron G. Rogers

Personal details
- Born: John Albert Carroll; July 30, 1901 Denver, Colorado, US
- Died: August 31, 1983 (aged 82) Denver, Colorado, US
- Resting place: Fort Logan National Cemetery
- Party: Democratic
- Spouse: Dorthy (née Doyle) Carroll
- Children: Diane Carroll MacDonald
- Education: Westminster Law School

Military service
- Allegiance: United States
- Branch/service: United States Army
- Years of service: 1943-1945
- Battles/wars: World War II

John Albert Carroll (July 30, 1901 – August 31, 1983) was a 20th-century American attorney and politician who served as a Democratic U.S. representative and U.S. senator from Colorado. He also served as a special assistant to President Harry Truman.

== Early life and education ==
Born in Denver, he attended the public schools, and during the First World War served in the United States Army from 1918 to 1919. He graduated from Westminster Law School in Denver in 1929, and was admitted to the bar the same year and commenced practice in Denver.

== Legal career ==
In 1933 and 1934 he was assistant United States attorney, and was district attorney of Denver from 1937 to 1941. He was regional attorney for the Office of Price Administration in 1942 and 1943, and served in the Second World War as a commissioned officer in the U.S. Army from 1943 to 1945, after which he resumed the practice of law.

== Political career ==
=== Congress ===
In 1946 and 1948 Carroll was elected as a Democratic representative to the Eightieth and Eighty-first Congresses (January 3, 1947 to January 3, 1951). Carroll returned the Denver district to Democrats after a one term Republican interim, winning in a Republican year nationally. He looked to be a comer; columnist Tris Coffin called him "the great white hope of the liberal labor folks. The leadership put him on the Ways and Means Committee in his second term.

=== Senate campaigns ===
Rather than run for re-election to the House in 1950, he was an unsuccessful candidate for election as a Democrat to the United States Senate. He ran for the Senate again in 1954 but was again defeated.

He was a special assistant to President Harry Truman from 1951 to 1952.

=== Tenure in the Senate ===
He was elected as a Democrat to the United States Senate in 1956, after defeating former United States Secretary of Agriculture Charles F. Brannan in the Democratic primary and former Republican Governor Daniel I.J. Thornton in the general election by a margin of less than one-half of one percent. He served in the Senate from January 3, 1957 to January 3, 1963. He was an unsuccessful candidate for reelection in 1962, having been defeated by Republican Peter H. Dominick.

== Retirement and death ==
He was a resident of Denver until his death. Interment was at Fort Logan National Cemetery, Denver.

== Electoral history ==
1946 United States House of Representatives elections, Colorado's 1st district
Party	Candidate	Votes	%
Democratic	John A. Carroll	60,513	51.75%
Republican	Dean M. Gillespie (incumbent)	55,724	47.66%
Socialist	Edgar P. Sherman	691	0.59%
Majority		4,789	4.09%
Total votes		116,928	100%
Democratic gain from Republican			

1948 United States House of Representatives elections, Colorado's 1st district
Party	Candidate	Votes	%
Democratic	John A. Carroll (incumbent)	106,096	64.84%
Republican	Christopher F. Cusack	57,541	35.16%
Majority		48,555	29.68%
Total votes		163,637	100%
Democratic hold			

1954 Colorado U.S. Senate election results
Party	Candidate	Votes	%	±%
Republican	Gordon Allott	248,502	51.32%	▲18.96
Democratic	John A. Carroll	235,686	48.68%	▼18.11
Total votes		484,188	100.00%	

Party political offices
Preceded by Barney L. Whatley	Democratic nominee for U.S. Senator from Colorado (Class 3); 1950, 1956, 1962	Succeeded by Stephen McNichols
Preceded by Edwin C. Johnson	Democratic nominee for U.S. Senator from Colorado (Class 2); 1954	Succeeded by Robert Lee Knous
U.S. House of Representatives
Preceded by Dean M. Gillespie	Member of the U.S. House of Representatives from Colorado's 1st congressional district 1947–1951	Succeeded by Byron G. Rogers
U.S. Senate
Preceded by Eugene D. Millikin	U.S. senator (Class 3) from Colorado; 1957–1963; Served alongside: Gordon L. Allott	Succeeded by Peter H. Dominick
