= Gordon Allott =

United States Senator from Colorado (1907–1989)

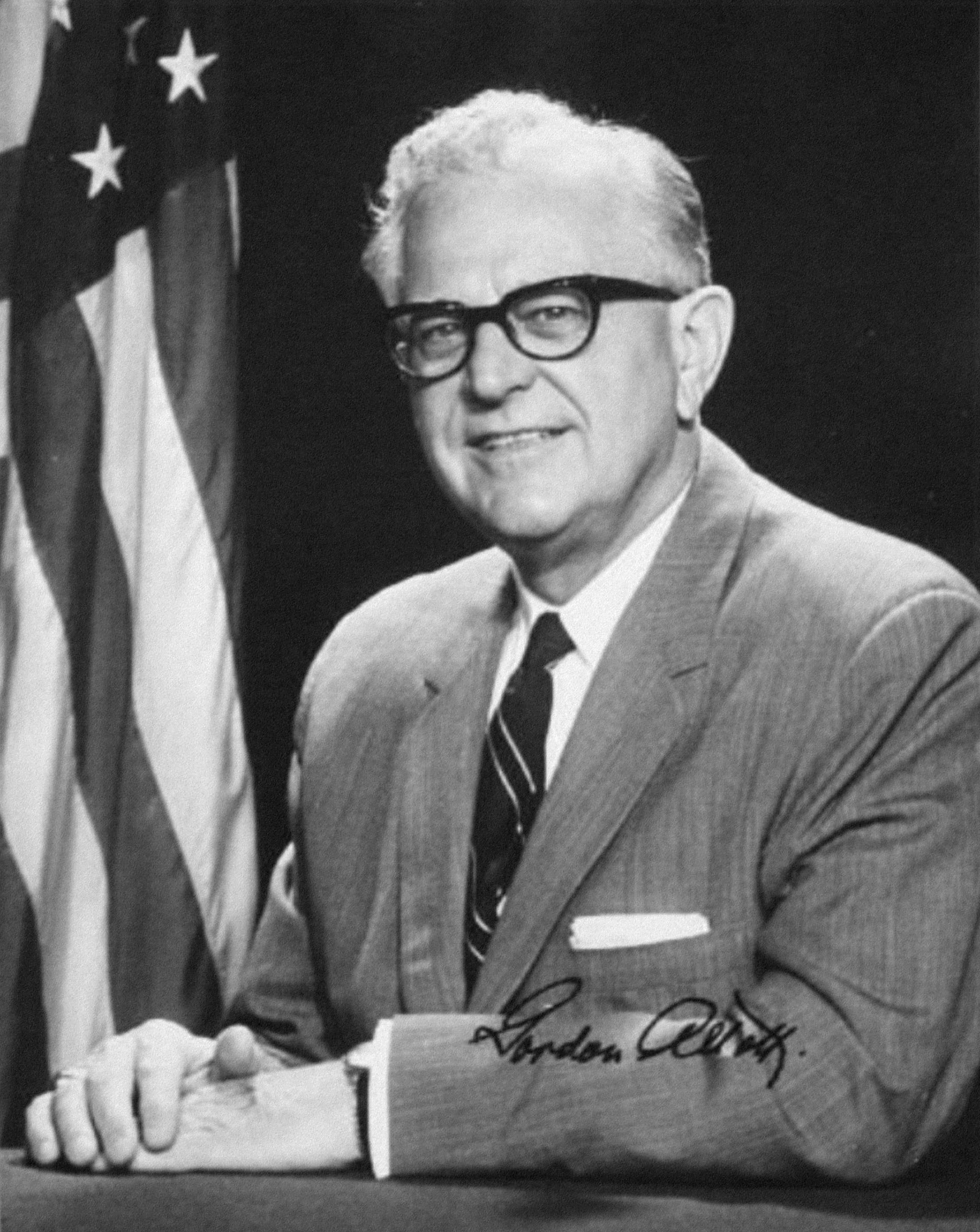

United States Senator from Colorado
- In office January 3, 1955 – January 3, 1973
- Preceded by: Edwin C. Johnson
- Succeeded by: Floyd Haskell
Senate positions
Chair of the Senate Republican Policy Committee
In office January 3, 1969 – January 3, 1973
Leader	Everett Dirksen; Hugh Scott
Preceded by	Bourke Hickenlooper
Succeeded by	John Tower

33rd Lieutenant Governor of Colorado
- In office January 9, 1951 – January 3, 1955
- Governor: Daniel I. J. Thornton
- Preceded by: Charles P. Murphy
- Succeeded by: Stephen McNichols

County Attorney of Prowers County, Colorado
- In office 1941–1946

City Attorney of Lamar, Colorado
- In office 1937–1941

Personal details
- Born: Gordon Llewellyn Allott; January 2, 1907 Pueblo, Colorado, U.S.
- Died: January 17, 1989 (aged 82) Englewood, Colorado, U.S.
- Party: Republican
- Education: University of Colorado Boulder (BA, LLB)

Military service
- Allegiance: United States
- Branch/service: United States Army
- Years of service: 1942–1946
- Rank: Major
- Unit: United States Army Air Corps
- Battles/wars: World War II

Gordon Llewellyn Allott (January 2, 1907 – January 17, 1989) was a Republican American politician.

== Biography ==
Allott was born in Pueblo, Colorado, to Bertha (née Llewellyn) and Leonard J. Allott. His maternal grandparents were Welsh and his paternal grandparents were English. He graduated from the University of Colorado at Boulder in 1927 and from its law school in 1929. Allott was also an athlete in his youth, winning the 440 yd hurdles at the 1929 United States championships. He was admitted to the bar in 1929 and commenced practice in Pueblo. He moved to Lamar, Colorado, in 1930 and continued practicing law.

Allott was the county attorney of Prowers County, Colorado, in 1934 and from 1941 to 1946. From 1934 to 1960, he was also the director of the First Federal Savings & Loan Association of Lamar. He became Lamar's city attorney in 1937, and served in this position until 1941.

Gordon was the founding chairman of the Colorado Federation of Young Republicans (then Young Republicans League of Colorado). He was the 3rd national chairman of the Young Republicans National Federation.

During World War II, Allott served as a major in the United States Army Air Forces from 1942 to 1946. After the war he became a district attorney in the fifteenth judicial district from 1946 to 1948. He was the vice chairman of the Colorado Board of Paroles from 1951 to 1955, and he served as the 33rd lieutenant governor of Colorado from 1951 to 1955 under Democratic governor Walter Walford Johnson and Republican governor Daniel I. J. Thornton.

Allott was elected to the United States Senate in 1954. He was reelected in 1960 and again in 1966, and served from January 3, 1955, to January 3, 1973. There he was chairman of the Republican Policy Committee. Allott voted in favor of the Civil Rights Acts of 1957, 1964, and 1968, as well as the 24th Amendment to the U.S. Constitution, the Voting Rights Act of 1965, and the confirmation of Thurgood Marshall to the U.S. Supreme Court, while Allott did not vote on the Civil Rights Act of 1960.

He was narrowly defeated for reelection in 1972 in an upset.

Allott died in Englewood, Colorado, and was interred in Fairmount Cemetery, Denver, Colorado.

Paul Weyrich and George Will worked on his Senate staff.

== See also ==
- List of chairpersons of the College Republicans

== Sources ==
- United States Congress. "Gordon Allott (id: A000161)". Biographical Directory of the United States Congress.
- Scribner Encyclopedia of American Lives.

Political offices
Preceded by Charles P. Murphy	Lieutenant Governor of Colorado; 1951–1955	Succeeded by Stephen McNichols
Party political offices
Preceded by Will Nicholson	Republican nominee for U.S. Senator from Colorado (Class 2); 1954, 1960, 1966, 1972	Succeeded by William L. Armstrong
Preceded by Bourke B. Hickenlooper	Chair of the Senate Republican Policy Committee; 1969–1973	Succeeded by John Tower
U.S. Senate
Preceded by Edwin C. Johnson	U.S. Senator (Class 2) from Colorado; 1955–1973; Served alongside: Eugene Millikin, John A. Carroll, Peter H. Dominick	Succeeded by Floyd Haskell
Preceded by Thomas Kuchel	Ranking Member of the Senate Interior Committee; 1969–1973	Succeeded by Paul Fannin
