= 1952 Colorado gubernatorial election =

- November 4, 1952
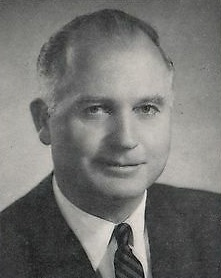

Nominee	Daniel I. J. Thornton	John W. Metzger
Party	Republican	Democratic
Popular vote	349,924	260,044
Percentage	57.08%	42.42%
- County results Thornton: 50–60% 60–70% 70–80% Metzger: 50–60% 60–70%
Governor before election
Daniel I. J. Thornton
Republican
Elected Governor
Daniel I. J. Thornton
Republican

The 1952 Colorado gubernatorial election was held on November 4, 1952. Incumbent Republican Daniel I. J. Thornton defeated Democratic nominee John W. Metzger with 57.08% of the vote.

== Primary elections ==
Primary elections were held on September 9, 1952.

=== Democratic primary ===
==== Candidates ====
- John W. Metzger, former Colorado Attorney General
- Wilkie Ham, State Senator
- Ben Bezoff, State Senator

==== Results ====
Democratic primary results
Party	Candidate	Votes	%
Democratic	John W. Metzger	50,007	49.6%
Democratic	Wilkie Ham	25,982	25.8%
Democratic	Ben Bezoff	24,746	24.6%
Total votes		100,735	100.00%

=== Republican primary ===
==== Candidates ====
- Daniel I. J. Thornton, incumbent Governor

==== Results ====
Republican primary results
Party	Candidate	Votes	%
Republican	Daniel I. J. Thornton (incumbent)	93,807	100.00

== General election ==
=== Candidates ===
Major party candidates

- Daniel I. J. Thornton, Republican
- John W. Metzger, Democratic

Other candidates

- Louis K. Stephens, Socialist Labor

=== Results ===
1952 Colorado gubernatorial election
Party	Candidate	Votes	%	±%
Republican	Daniel I. J. Thornton (incumbent)	349,924	57.08%	+4.65%
Democratic	John W. Metzger	260,044	42.42%	−4.80%
Socialist Labor	Louis K. Stephens	3,066	0.50%	+0.16%
Majority		89,880	14.66%	+9.45%
Turnout		613,034		
Republican hold		Swing		
