= 1962 United States Senate election in Colorado =

- November 6, 1962
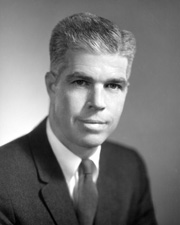

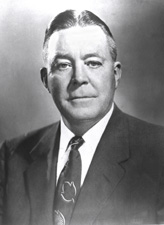
Nominee	Peter H. Dominick	John A. Carroll
Party	Republican	Democratic
Popular vote	328,655	279,586
Percentage	53.58%	45.58%
- County results Dominick: 40–50% 50–60% 60–70% Carroll: 40–50% 50–60% 60–70% Tie: 40–50%
U.S. senator before election
John A. Carroll
Democratic
Elected U.S. Senator
Peter Dominick
Republican

The 1962 United States Senate election in Colorado took place on November 6, 1962. Incumbent Democratic U.S. Senator John A. Carroll ran for re-election to a second term in office, but was defeated by Republican U.S. Representative Peter H. Dominick.

== General election ==
=== Results ===
1962 United States Senate election in Colorado
Party	Candidate	Votes	%	±%
Republican	Peter Dominick	328,655	53.58%	▲3.80
Democratic	John A. Carroll (inc.)	279,586	45.58%	▼4.64
Socialist	Charlotte Benson	3,546	0.58%	N/A
Independent	Henry John Olshaw	1,217	0.20%	N/A
Socialist Workers	Tom Leonard	440	0.07%	N/A
Total votes		891,813	100.00%	
Republican gain from Democratic		Swing		

== See also ==
- 1962 United States Senate elections
