= 1950 United States Senate election in Colorado =

- November 7, 1950
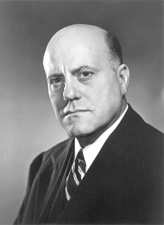

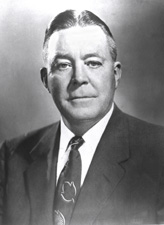
Nominee	Eugene Millikin	John A. Carroll
Party	Republican	Democratic
Popular vote	239,724	210,442
Percentage	53.25%	46.75%
- County results Millikin: 50–60% 60–70% Carroll: 50–60% 60–70%
U.S. senator before election
Eugene Millikin
Republican
Elected U.S. Senator
Eugene Millikin
Republican

The 1950 United States Senate election in Colorado took place on November 7, 1950. Incumbent Republican Senator Eugene Millikin ran for re-election to his second full term. He faced a strong challenge from Congressman John A. Carroll, the Democratic nominee, in the general election. Carroll ultimately lost, but despite facing considerable headwinds nationwide, held Millikin to the narrowest victory of his career.

== Democratic primary ==
=== Candidates ===
- John A. Carroll, U.S. Congressman from Colorado's 1st congressional district

=== Results ===
Democratic primary results
Party	Candidate	Votes	%
Democratic	John A. Carroll	66,507	100.00
Total votes		66,507	100.00

== Republican primary ==
=== Candidates ===
- Eugene Millikin, incumbent U.S. Senator

=== Results ===
Republican primary results
Party	Candidate	Votes	%
Republican	Eugene D. Millikin (inc.)	70,953	100.00
Total votes		70,953	100.00

== General election ==
=== Results ===
1950 United States Senate election in Colorado
Party	Candidate	Votes	%	±%
Republican	Eugene Millikin (inc.)	239,724	53.25%	−2.80%
Democratic	John A. Carroll	210,442	46.75%	+3.44%
Majority		29,282	6.50%	−6.24%
Turnout		450,166		
Republican hold				
