= Ralph Lawrence Carr =

American politician (1887–1950)

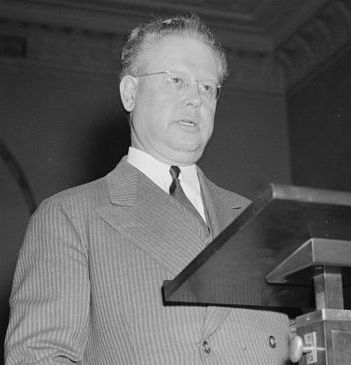

29th Governor of Colorado
- In office January 10, 1939 – January 12, 1943
- Lieutenant: John Charles Vivian
- Preceded by: Teller Ammons
- Succeeded by: John Charles Vivian

Personal details
- Born: December 11, 1887 Rosita, Colorado, U.S.
- Died: September 22, 1950 (aged 62) Denver, Colorado, U.S.
- Party: Republican
- Spouse(s): (1) Gretchen Fowler (2) Eleanor Fairall Howe
- Education: University of Colorado
- Profession: lawyer, newspaper editor

Ralph Lawrence Carr (December 11, 1887 – September 22, 1950) was an American attorney and politician who served as the 29th governor of Colorado from 1939 to 1943. During World War II, he defended the rights of American citizens of Japanese descent and allowed their voluntary relocation to Colorado.

== Governor ==
In 1938, after running unopposed in the Republican primary, Carr was elected to a two-year term as governor of Colorado, defeating Democrat Teller Ammons, the incumbent governor.

A conservative Republican, Carr was committed to fiscal restraint in state government and opposed the New Deal policies of President Franklin Roosevelt.

In July 1939, he joined 33 other governors in a statement calling for "moral rearmament" as a solution to the current economic crisis. In August he sent the Colorado National Guard to quell violence between AFL-organized strikers and non-strikers at the Green Mountain Dam construction site. In late 1939, when he was mentioned as a possible Republican candidate for vice-president on the national ticket in 1940, he indicated he preferred to seek re-election as governor: "I am not interested in any job outside Colorado right now." At the Republican National Convention in June 1940, Carr supported Wendell Willkie and seconded his nomination.

He was re-elected in 1940. In January 1941, Carr issued an unconditional pardon to Michael Fillipo, who had been convicted of assault in 1915, escaped from a Colorado prison farm, served in the U.S. Army in World War I, and lived in Brooklyn with his wife and seven children before revealing his Colorado criminal record voluntarily when filing his alien registration.

In July 1942, the state Republican Convention nominated Carr unanimously for the U.S. Senate. Facing the Democratic incumbent Edwin C. Johnson, a former isolationist who pledged unreserved support for FDR, Carr called for "a return to the two-party system, preservation of constitutional rights and an end to bureaucratic dictatorship". He lost the race narrowly in November, with 49.2% of the vote to Johnson's 50.2%.

In September 1950, attempting a political comeback, he won the Republican nomination for governor. He died soon after.

== Support for Japanese Americans ==
Following Roosevelt's issuance of Executive Order 9066 on February 19, 1942, the War Relocation Authority decided to resettle Japanese Americans from the West Coast into internment camps in the interior of the continent. One camp was Amache near Granada, Colorado. Carr took a unique position among Western governors, who largely adopted the popular anti-Japanese sentiment of the period. The governors supported internment of all Japanese, whatever their citizenship, and also objected to locating internment camps in their states. Carr, on the other hand, opposed interning American citizens, depriving them of their basic rights as citizens based only on their racial background or the citizenship of their ancestors. Unlike his peers, Carr agreed that Colorado should accept its share of the evacuees and treat them respectfully. He also underscored the broader context of war against several enemy countries in order to downplay the struggle with Japan that could easily be seen as a racial conflict. When he volunteered Colorado for housing Italian, German, and Japanese relocated from the West Coast, he said:

They are as loyal to American institutions as you and I. Many of them have been born here–are American citizens, with no connection or feeling of loyalty toward the customs and philosophies of Italy, Germany and Japan. ... I am not talking on behalf of Japanese, of Italians, or of Germans as such when I say this. I am talking to ... all American people whether their status be white, brown or black and regardless of the birthplaces of their grandfathers when I say that if a majority may deprive a minority of its freedom, contrary to the terms of the Constitution today, then you as a minority may be subjected to the same ill-will of the majority tomorrow.

In one speech to a large and hostile audience, made up primarily of worried Colorado farmers, Carr said of the evacuees:

They are not going to take over the vegetable business of this state, and they are not going to take over the Arkansas Valley. But the Japanese are protected by the same Constitution that protects us. An American citizen of Japanese descent has the same rights as any other citizen. ... If you harm them, you must first harm me. I was brought up in small towns where I knew the shame and dishonor of race hatred. I grew to despise it because it threatened [pointing to various audience members] the happiness of you and you and you.

Carr's advocacy for racial tolerance and for protection of the constitutional rights of the Japanese Americans are generally thought to have cost him his political career. He narrowly lost the 1942 Senate election to incumbent Democratic Senator Edwin C. Johnson, who in 1942 had advocated using the National Guard to prevent Japanese Americans from entering Colorado and charged that Carr was more interested in exploiting Japanese labor than protecting civil liberties.

== Personal life ==
Carr married Gretchen Fowler, and together they adopted two children, a boy and a girl. Years after she died, he married Eleanor Fairall in 1948. She was a former client and the daughter of Herbert Fairall, publisher of the Daily Journal.

== Death ==
Carr died in a Denver hospital on September 22, 1950, after a long illness related to diabetes. He was buried in Fairmount Cemetery in Denver.

== Legacy ==
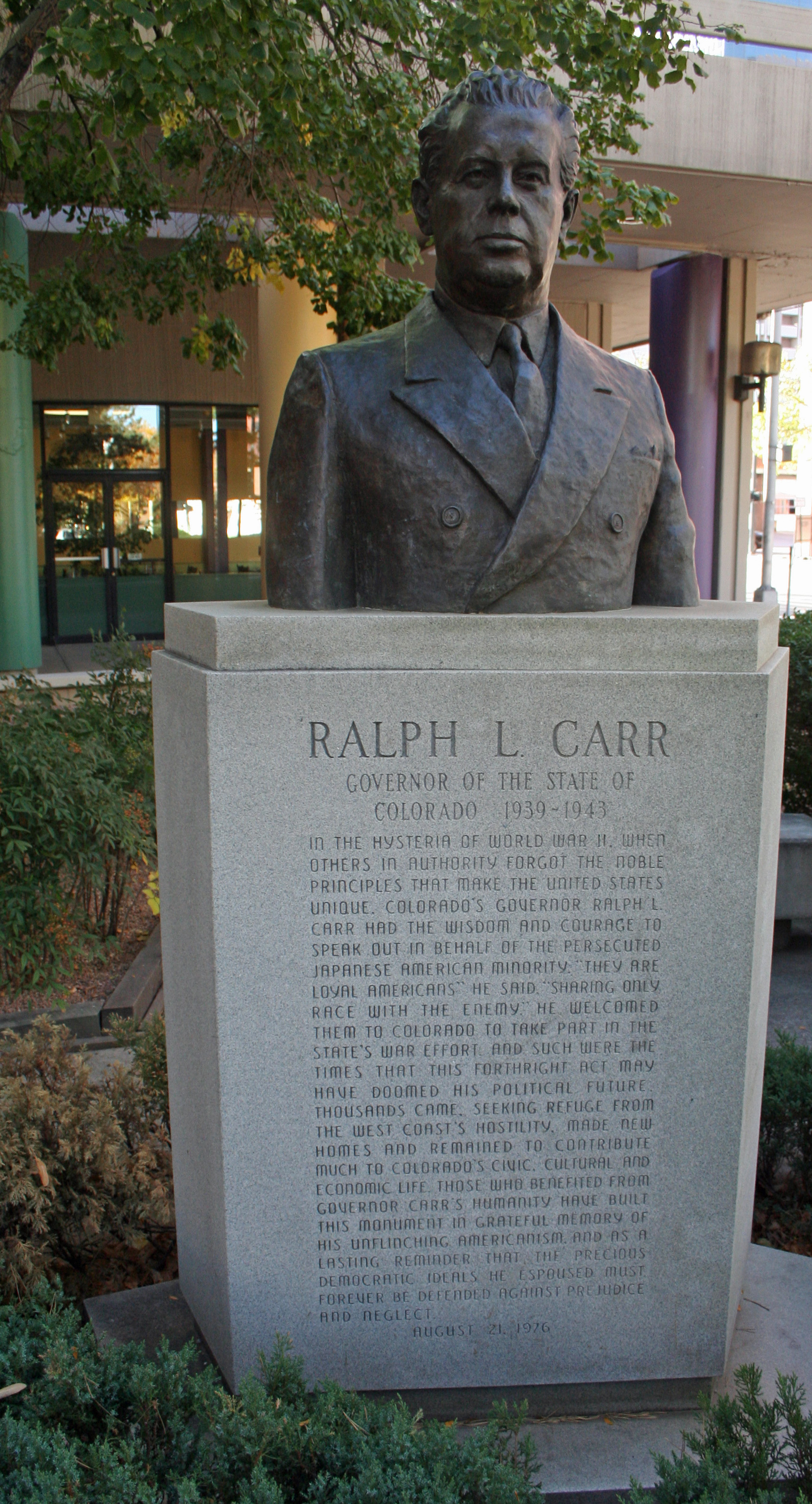
Bust of Ralph L. Carr, Sakura Square

In 1976, a bust of Carr was erected in Denver's Sakura Square to commemorate his efforts on behalf of Japanese-Americans. The inscription reads, in part: "Those who benefited from Governor Carr's humanity have built this monument in grateful memory of his unflinching Americanism, and as a lasting reminder that the precious democratic ideals he espoused must forever be defended against prejudice and neglect."

Carr has a street named after him which runs through the western suburbs of Westminster, Arvada, Wheat Ridge, and Lakewood.

In 1994, Emperor Akihito and Empress Michiko of Japan included a visit to Denver on their tour of the U.S. to honor Carr and Colorado's role in the Japanese internment.

In 1999, the Denver Post named Carr its "Person of the Century".

On March 14, 2008, both houses of the Colorado legislature, in a unanimous vote, named a section of U.S. Route 285 between Kenosha Pass and C-470 the "Ralph Carr Memorial Highway." A monument to him at Kenosha Pass was dedicated on December 12, 2010. The inscription includes a quotation from Carr: "When it is suggested that American citizens be thrown into concentration camps, where they lose all privileges of citizenship under the Constitution, then the principles of that great document are violated and lost."

On June 4, 2008, Colorado Governor Bill Ritter signed legislation authorizing the construction of a new state judicial complex in Denver to be named the Ralph L. Carr Colorado Judicial Center, occupying the entire block between 13th and 14th Avenues and Broadway and Lincoln Street. The center is home to the Colorado State Supreme Court, as well as other major courts and legal agencies.

On July 6, 2012, the Japanese American Citizens League decided to create a special award in his honor.

August 2025, a historical marker honoring Governor Carr, donated by the Jewish American Society for Historic Preservation, with support from the Cripple Creek District Museum, was sited in Cripple Creek.

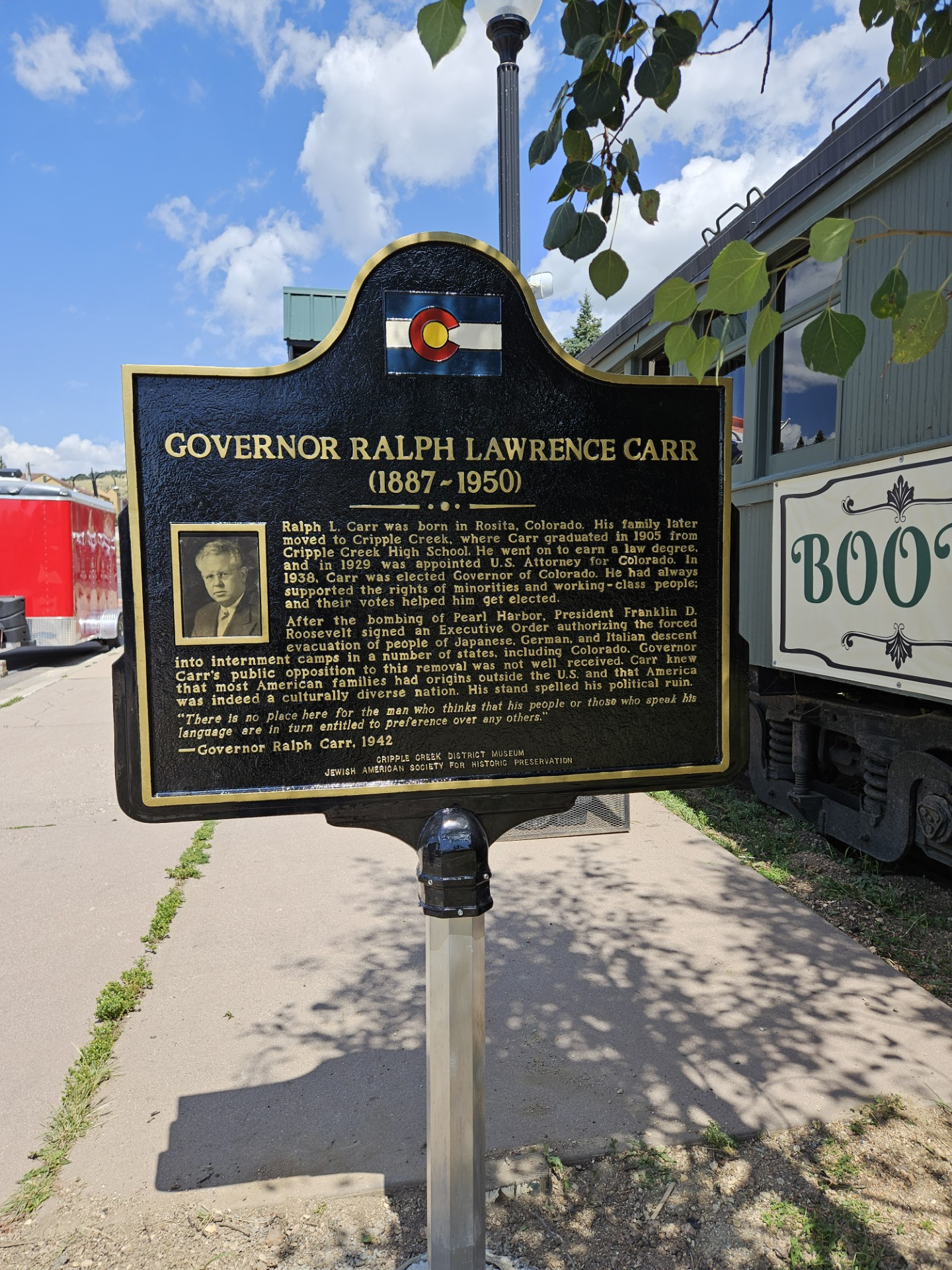
Historical marker honoring Governor Ralph Carr in Cripple Creek, Colorado.

Party political offices
Preceded by Charles M. Armstrong	Republican nominee for Governor of Colorado; 1938, 1940	Succeeded by John Charles Vivian
Preceded by Raymond L. Sauter	Republican nominee for U.S. Senator from Colorado (Class 2); 1942	Succeeded by Will Nicholson
Political offices
Preceded by Teller Ammons	Governor of Colorado; 1939–1943	Succeeded by John Charles Vivian
