= Eugene Millikin =

American politician (1891–1958)

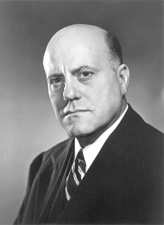

Republican Senate Conference Chairman
- In office January 3, 1947 – January 3, 1957
- Leader: Wallace H. White, Jr. Kenneth S. Wherry; Styles Bridges; Robert A. Taft; William F. Knowland
- Vice Chair: Milton Young
- Preceded by: Arthur H. Vandenberg
- Succeeded by: Leverett Saltonstall

Chairman of the Senate Committee on Finance
- In office January 3, 1953 – January 3, 1955
- Preceded by: Walter F. George
- Succeeded by: Harry F. Byrd
- In office January 3, 1947 – January 3, 1949
- Preceded by: Walter F. George
- Succeeded by: Walter F. George

United States Senator from Colorado
- In office December 20, 1941 – January 3, 1957
- Preceded by: Alva B. Adams
- Succeeded by: John A. Carroll

Personal details
- Born: Eugene Donald Millikin; February 12, 1891 Hamilton, Ohio, U.S.
- Died: July 26, 1958 (aged 67) Denver, Colorado, U.S.
- Party: Republican

Eugene Donald Millikin (February 12, 1891 – July 26, 1958) was a United States senator from Colorado who served as Senate Republican Conference chairperson from 1947 to 1956.

== Biography ==
Born in Hamilton, Ohio, Millikin graduated from the law school of the University of Colorado at Boulder in 1913. He was admitted to the bar the same year and commenced practice in Salt Lake City, Utah. He entered politics and served as executive secretary to the Governor from 1915 to 1917. During World War I he enlisted as a private in the Colorado National Guard in 1917, saw action in France and was mustered out as a lieutenant colonel. Millikin resumed the practice of law in Denver, Colorado, and became president of Kinney-Coastal Oil.

Millikin was appointed by Governor Ralph Lawrence Carr on December 20, 1941, and subsequently elected on November 3, 1942, as a Republican to the United States Senate to fill the vacancy in the term ending January 3, 1945, caused by the death of Alva B. Adams. He was reelected in 1944 and 1950, and served in all from December 20, 1941, to January 3, 1957. (He was not a candidate for renomination in 1956).

He served as chairman of the U.S. Senate Committee on Finance, the Senate Republican Conference, the U.S. Senate Joint Committee on Internal Revenue Taxation.

Millikin identified with the conservative wing of the Senate GOP. He also voted for an FEPC bill in 1950 in addition to bolstering President Harry Truman's army desegregation.

In a meeting of the Joint Congressional Committee on Atomic Energy on July 20, 1949, he opposed - supported by Senator Arthur Vandenberg - a cooperation between the US and the UK in the production of atomic weapons because he believed that the American public opinion assumed that the US monopoly possession of atomic weapons gave the US a real advantage in an uncertain world.

Millikin died in Denver in 1958 and was interred in the Fairmount Mausoleum at Fairmount Cemetery in Denver.

U.S. Senate
Preceded by Alva B. Adams	U.S. senator (Class 3) from Colorado; 1941–1957; Served alongside: Edwin C. Johnson, Gordon L. Allott	Succeeded by John A. Carroll
Political offices
Preceded by Walter F. George	Chairman of the Senate Finance Committee; 1947–1949	Succeeded by Walter F. George
Preceded by Walter F. George	Chairman of the Senate Finance Committee; 1953–1955	Succeeded by Harry F. Byrd
Party political offices
Preceded by Archibald A. Lee	Republican nominee for U.S. Senator from Colorado (Class 3); 1942, 1944, 1950	Succeeded by Daniel I. J. Thornton
Preceded by Arthur H. Vandenberg	Chairman of the Senate Republican Conference; 1947–1956	Succeeded by Leverett Saltonstall
