= Ray Herbert Talbot =

American politician (1896–1955)

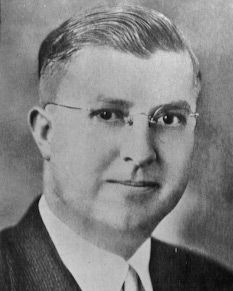

27th Governor of Colorado
- In office January 1, 1937 – January 12, 1937
- Lieutenant: Vacant
- Preceded by: Edwin C. Johnson
- Succeeded by: Teller Ammons

26th Lieutenant Governor of Colorado
- In office 1933–1937
- Governor: Edwin C. Johnson
- Preceded by: Edwin C. Johnson
- Succeeded by: Frank J. Hayes

Member of the Colorado Senate
- In office 1928-1932

Member of the Colorado House of Representatives
- In office 1926-1928

Personal details
- Born: August 19, 1896 Chicago, Illinois, U.S.
- Died: January 30, 1955 (aged 58) Pueblo, Colorado, U.S.
- Party: Democratic

Raymond Herbert Talbot (August 19, 1896 – January 30, 1955) was an American politician who served as the 27th governor of Colorado for eleven days in 1937.

Talbot, an electrical engineer, was elected to the Colorado House of Representatives in 1926 and to the Colorado Senate in 1928. In 1932, he was elected the 26th lieutenant governor as the running mate of Edwin C. Johnson. Johnson resigned as governor on January 1, 1937, eleven days before the expiration of his term, to take his seat in the United States Senate. Talbot was sworn in as governor to fill the eleven-day interim until the start of the term of newly elected governor Teller Ammons.

After his brief term as governor, Talbot served as a city commissioner and postmaster of Pueblo, Colorado, and continued in office as president of the Colorado State Fair Commission (1931–1953).

He married Juniatta L. Wilson and had two children.

Talbot died on January 30, 1955, at the age of 58, and he is buried at the Mountain View Cemetery in Pueblo.

Political offices
Preceded by Edwin C. Johnson	Lieutenant Governor of Colorado; 1933–1937	Succeeded by Frank J. Hayes
Preceded by Edwin C. Johnson	Governor of Colorado; January 1, 1937 – January 12, 1937	Succeeded by Teller Ammons
