= Elias M. Ammons =

American Governor of Colorado (1860–1925)

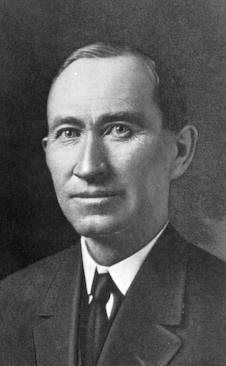

Member of the Colorado House of Representatives from the Douglas County district
- In office January 7, 1891 – January 2, 1895
- Preceded by: Pleasant W. O'Brien
- Succeeded by: Washington I. Whittier

19th Governor of Colorado
- In office January 14, 1913 – January 12, 1915
- Lieutenant: Stephen R. Fitzgarrald
- Preceded by: John F. Shafroth
- Succeeded by: George A. Carlson

Member of the Colorado Senate
- In office 1898–1902

Personal details
- Born: Elias Milton Ammons; July 28, 1860 Macon County, North Carolina, US
- Died: May 20, 1925 (aged 64) Denver, Colorado, US
- Party: Republican, Democrat
- Spouse: Elizabeth Fleming Ammons (m.1889)
- Children: 5
- Relatives: Theodosia Grace Ammons (sister), Teller Ammons (son), Elizabeth Ammons Larsen (daughter), Jehu R. Ammons (father), Margaret Ammons (mother)

Elias Milton Ammons (July 28, 1860 – May 20, 1925) served as the 19th governor of Colorado from 1913 to 1915. He is perhaps best remembered for ordering National Guard troops into Ludlow, Colorado during the Colorado Coalfield War, which resulted in the Ludlow Massacre. He was also instrumental in starting the National Western Stock Show, which is still active. His son, Teller Ammons, was also governor of Colorado.

== Early life ==
On July 28, 1860, Ammons was born in Macon County, North Carolina. Ammons' parents were Jehu R. and Margaret Ammons. His father was a Baptist minister, and his mother was descended from the Pennsylvania Dutch.

In 1871, Ammons and his family moved to Denver, Colorado. Ammons graduated from East High School in Denver in 1880.

Ammons' sister was Theodosia Grace Ammons, who later became a faculty member at Colorado State University, and president of the Colorado Equal Suffrage Association.

== Career ==
In 1886, at age 26, Ammons started a successful cattle ranch in Douglas County, Colorado, south of Denver.

=== Legislative ===
In 1890, running as a Republican, Ammons was elected unopposed to the Colorado House of Representatives from Douglas County. He was re-elected, again unopposed, in 1892. After leaving the Colorado House, Ammons became a Democrat and served in the Colorado State Senate from 1898 to 1902. He publicly debated Gifford Pinchot, chief of the United States Department of Agriculture's Division of Forestry and head of the federal government's conservation movement, three times between 1901 and 1909.

=== Governorship ===
In 1912, Ammons was elected Governor of Colorado. He defeated five other candidates--Edward P. Costigan, Clifford C. Parks, Charles A. Ashelstrom, John Henry Ketchum, and Jonathan U. Billings--with 42.9% of the vote. His term as governor lasted from January 14, 1913 to January 12, 1915.

Ammons was elected on an anti-conservation platform and was against federal control of Colorado lands. He believed strongly in the sovereignty of the states and worried that the federal government was encroaching on the political independence of Colorado. Further, he was concerned that federal land reservation would stunt Colorado's economic growth.

While governor, Ammons was accused of favoring mine owners and companies, particularly John D. Rockefeller Jr.'s Colorado Fuel & Iron, during the 1913-14 strike and civil unrest known as the Colorado Coalfield War. Ammons had been elected as a progressive Republican at the time when the bulk of the Republican Party was turning to the right. As a progressive he would have been expected to be at least minimally sympathetic to the plight of labor in the Colorado coal mines. Miners worked in highly dangerous conditions for inadequate pay. They were constantly at the threat of dangerous air, mine collapses and explosions. After multiple unsuccessful strikes from the 1890s to 1914, the miners struck again in 1914. Ammons tried to broker a truce and brought both the mine owners and union representatives together at the Governor's mansion in Denver. However, the mine owners refused to make even the slightest concession and Ammons was too naive to recognize their intransigence. Instead he allowed the mine owners to convince him that their position was correct, after which he sent the Colorado militia to the tent city in Ludlow where miners and their families had been forced to live. They had been turned out of their homes in company towns. In the space of a few weeks the militia had turned against the miners and fired upon them on April 20, 1914, killing many miners but also several women and about eleven children. This event became known as the Ludlow Massacre. Thus even if Ammons did not personally favor the Rockefeller company, his actions certainly favored the company at the expense of the workers.

Ammons was finally able to end the "Coalfield War" by asking President Woodrow Wilson to send in federal troops. When these arrived the miners voted to end the strike. However, Ammons entreated Wilson to send troops to Colorado only after a crowd of 1000 women descended upon him in Denver, demanding that he do something to end the violence. On the role of "the silent army of 1000 women" see Thomas (2008).

Ammons retired from public service upon the end of his term as governor in 1915.

== Personal life ==
Ammons contracted a severe case of measles in his youth that permanently impaired his eyesight. It was after this illness that he developed the interest in ranching that led to his career in the cattle business.

On January 29, 1889, Ammons married Elizabeth Fleming in Denver, Colorado. They had five children.

Ammons' son Bruce became a rancher in Grand County, Colorado. Daughter Elizabeth became an accomplished equestrienne; she married Henry Louis Larsen and later became the First Lady of American Samoa and First Lady of Guam. Another son, Teller Ammons, followed in his father's footsteps and became Governor of Colorado.

Ammons died May 20, 1925 in Denver. He was interred at Denver's Fairmont Cemetery.

Party political offices
Preceded by John F. Shafroth	Democratic nominee for Governor of Colorado; 1912	Succeeded by Thomas M. Patterson
Political offices
Preceded by John F. Shafroth	Governor of Colorado; 1913–1915	Succeeded by George Alfred Carlson
