= Daniel I. J. Thornton =

American politician from Colorado (1911–1976)

Dan Thornton
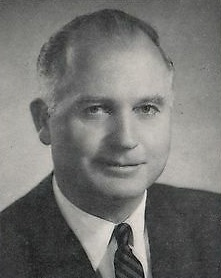

Chair of the National Governors Association
- In office August 2, 1953 – July 11, 1954
- Preceded by: Allan Shivers
- Succeeded by: Robert F. Kennon

33rd Governor of Colorado
- In office January 9, 1951 – January 11, 1955
- Lieutenant: Gordon Allott
- Preceded by: Walter Walford Johnson
- Succeeded by: Edwin C. Johnson

Personal details
- Born: January 31, 1911 Hall County, Texas, U.S.
- Died: January 18, 1976 (aged 64) Carmel, California, U.S.
- Resting place: Gunnison Cemetery; Gunnison, Colorado
- Party: Republican
- Spouse: Jessie Willock
- Education: Texas Tech University, Lubbock; University of California, Los Angeles
- Profession: Cattle breeder

Daniel Isaac J. Thornton (January 31, 1911 – January 18, 1976) was an American Republican politician who served as the 33rd governor of the state of Colorado from 1951 to 1955.

== Biography ==
Daniel Isaac J. Thornton was born in Hall County, Texas, on January 31, 1911, and in 1929 he graduated from Lubbock High School in Lubbock, Texas. He was active in 4-H and was elected President of the Texas 4-H clubs in 1927. Thornton attended (1929–30) Texas Technological College (now Texas Tech University) in Lubbock, attended the University of California at Los Angeles (UCLA) in 1932 and received Honorary Doctor's Degrees from Western State College in Gunnison, Colorado, in 1951 and Texas Technological College in 1953.

He married Jessie Willock, and they remained married until her death in 1972. In 1937, the Thorntons purchased a cattle ranch near Springerville in northeastern Arizona. In 1941, they moved their operation to a ranch in Gunnison County in southern Colorado. The Thorntons developed the Thornton Type, a strain of Hereford cattle. In 1948, Thornton was elected to the Colorado State Senate, a position that he held for only two years before becoming governor.

== Political career ==
In 1950, Thornton defeated incumbent Democratic governor Walter Walford Johnson. Thornton was known for his Stetson hat, pipe, and cowboy boots. He served as governor for two then two-year terms. As governor, he was instrumental in developing the U.S. Air Force Academy in Colorado Springs. In 1952 he was one of five people on the short list for consideration of the Republican vice presidential nomination. Dwight D. Eisenhower, like Thornton Texas-born, instead chose Richard Nixon, a freshman U.S. senator from California.

In 1956, Thornton was under discussion for a cabinet appointment. He was the Republican nominee for the U.S. Senate in Colorado that year, but was narrowly defeated by the Democrat John A. Carroll.

== Death and legacy ==
Dan Thornton died of a heart attack in Carmel, California, on January 18, 1976, two weeks shy of his 65th birthday.

Governor Thornton is the namesake of the City of Thornton outside Denver, Colorado. In 2008, he was listed among the "100 Most Influential People" from Lubbock, as part of the city centennial observation.

== See also ==
- History of Colorado
- Law and government of Colorado
- List of governors of Colorado
- State of Colorado
- Thornton, Colorado

Party political offices
Preceded by David A. Hamil	Republican nominee for Governor of Colorado; 1950, 1952	Succeeded by Donald G. Brotzman
Preceded by Eugene Millikin	Republican nominee for U.S. senator from Colorado (Class 3); 1956	Succeeded by Peter H. Dominick
Political offices
Preceded by Walter Walford Johnson	Governor of Colorado; 1951–1955	Succeeded by Edwin C. Johnson
Preceded by Allan Shivers	Chair of the National Governors Association; 1953–1954	Succeeded by Robert F. Kennon
