= Teller Ammons =

American attorney and politician (1895–1972)

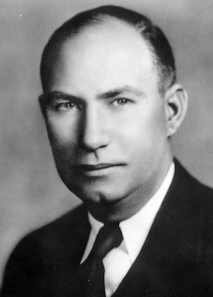

28th Governor of Colorado
- In office January 12, 1937 – January 10, 1939
- Lieutenant: Frank Hayes
- Preceded by: Ray Herbert Talbot
- Succeeded by: Ralph Lawrence Carr

Member of the Colorado Senate
- In office 1931-1935

Personal details
- Born: Teller Ammons; December 3, 1895 Denver, Colorado, US
- Died: January 16, 1972 (aged 76) Denver, Colorado, US
- Party: Democratic
- Spouse: Esther Daves Ammons
- Children: Davis Ammons (son)
- Parent(s): Elias M. Ammons (father), Elizabeth (née Fleming) Ammons (mother)
- Education: University of Denver

Teller Ammons (December 3, 1895 – January 16, 1972) was an American attorney and politician who served as the 28th governor of Colorado from 1937 to 1939. He was the first Colorado governor to be born in the state.

== Early life ==
Ammons was born in Denver, Colorado, on December 3, 1895. His father was Elias M. Ammons, a former Governor of Colorado. Ammons' mother was Elizabeth (née Fleming) Ammons. Ammons was named for his father's friend, U.S. Senator Henry Moore Teller.

== Career ==
He served with the 154th Infantry Regiment in the United States Army in France during World War I.

After the war, he returned to Colorado to work on a ranch and in a newspaper office. He earned a law degree from the University of Denver's Westminster Law School in 1929.

Ammons was elected to the Colorado Senate in 1930 and served until 1935, when Denver Mayor Benjamin F. Stapleton appointed him as Denver city attorney.

In 1936, Ammons was elected Governor of Colorado. He was sworn in January 12, 1937 and served until January 10, 1939.

As Governor, he was responsible for the execution of Joe Arridy, an intellectually disabled accused of a crime he did not commit. Ammons had refused to pardon Arridy or commute his sentence, and did not address petitions on his behalf.

Other notable actions during Ammons' term included founding the State Water Conservation Board and the State Game and Fish Department. The State Industrial School was restructured, the Big Thompson Highway was opened, and employment opportunities increased through the Works Progress Administration.

A scandal hit Ammons' administration in 1937, when eavesdropping devices were found in his office. Three men were charged and found guilty of conspiracy and eavesdropping. After one two-year term, Ammons was defeated for re-election in 1938 by Ralph L. Carr.

During World War II, Ammons served as a lieutenant colonel on the selection and assignment board for military officers until 1944; that year he was re-assigned to the military government of Guam. He separated from the service in 1945.

Afterwards, he practiced law in Denver until his retirement.

== Personal life ==
He was married to Esther Daves Ammons. They had one child, Davis Ammons.

Ammons died in Denver on January 16, 1972, and was buried in Denver's Fairmount Cemetery.

Party political offices
Preceded by Edwin C. Johnson	Democratic nominee for Governor of Colorado; 1936, 1938	Succeeded by George E. Saunders
Political offices
Preceded by Ray Herbert Talbot	Governor of Colorado; 1937–1939	Succeeded by Ralph Lawrence Carr
