= Edwin C. Johnson =

American politician (1884–1970)

Ed Johnson
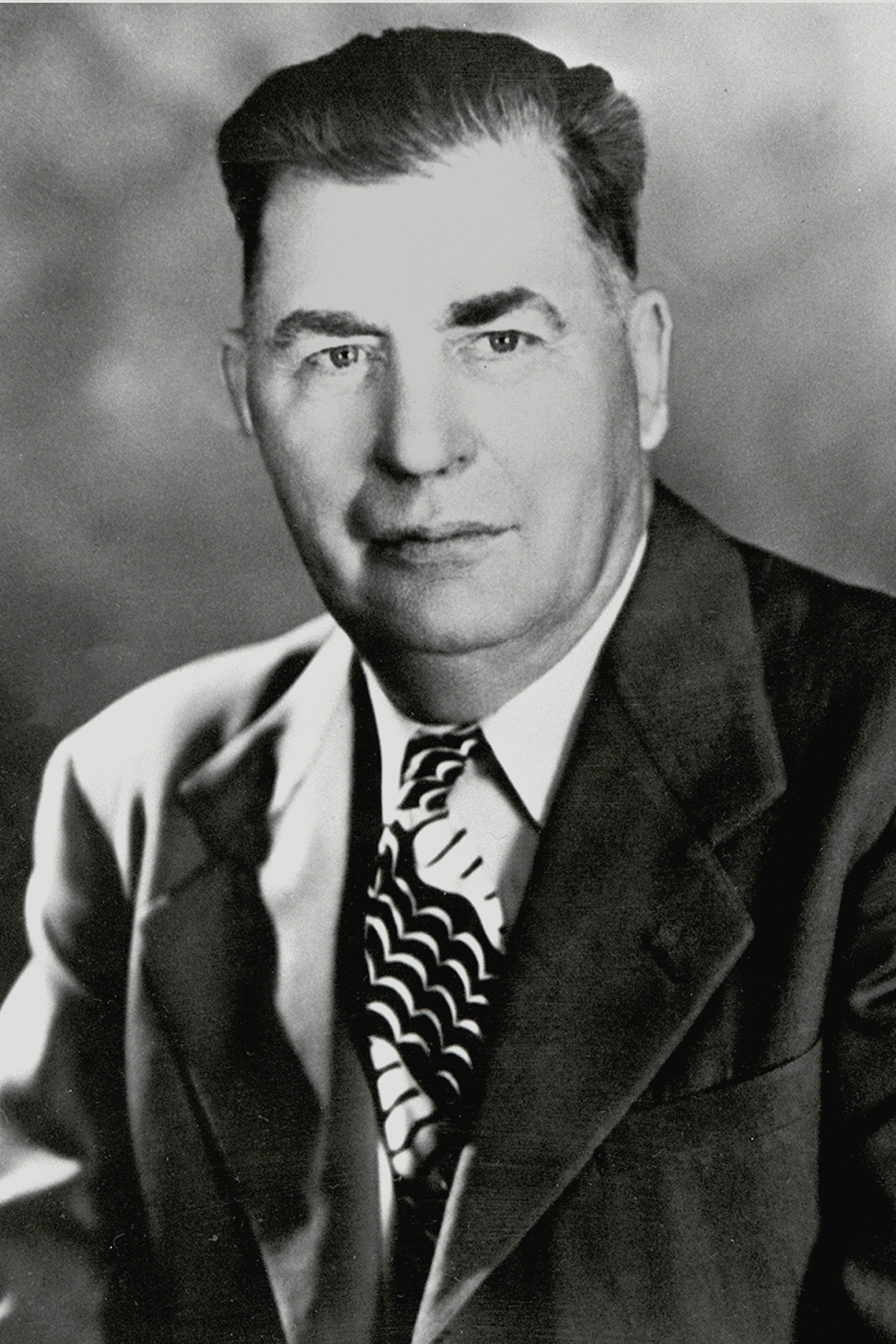

26th and 34th Governor of Colorado
- In office January 11, 1955 – January 8, 1957
- Lieutenant: Stephen McNichols
- Preceded by: Daniel I. J. Thornton
- Succeeded by: Stephen McNichols
- In office January 10, 1933 – January 1, 1937
- Lieutenant: Ray Herbert Talbot
- Preceded by: Billy Adams
- Succeeded by: Ray Herbert Talbot

United States Senator from Colorado
- In office January 3, 1937 – January 3, 1955
- Preceded by: Edward Costigan
- Succeeded by: Gordon Allott

25th Lieutenant Governor of Colorado
- In office January 13, 1931 – January 10, 1933
- Governor: Billy Adams
- Preceded by: George Milton Corlett
- Succeeded by: Ray Herbert Talbot

Member of the Colorado House of Representatives
- In office 1923–1931

Personal details
- Born: Edwin Carl Johnson; January 1, 1884 Scandia, Kansas, U.S.
- Died: May 30, 1970 (aged 86) Denver, Colorado, U.S.
- Resting place: Fairmount Mausoleum
- Party: Democratic
- Spouse: Ferne Claire "Blossom" Armitage Johnson
- Children: 2
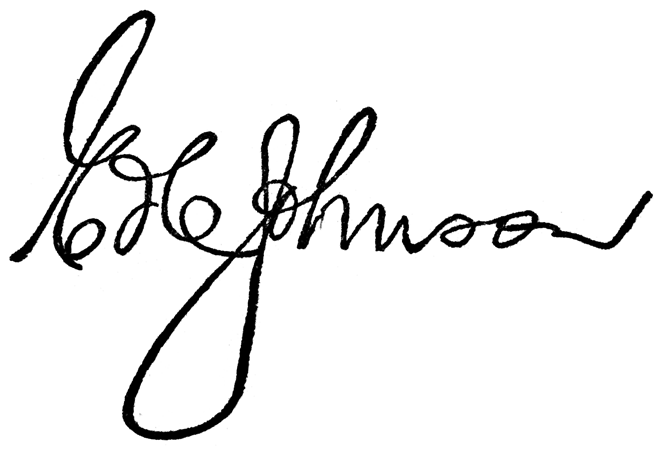
- Signature

Edwin Carl Johnson (January 1, 1884 – May 30, 1970) was an American politician of the Democratic Party who served as both governor of and U.S. senator from the state of Colorado.

== Early life ==
Johnson was born in Scandia in Republic County in northern Kansas. As a child, he moved with his family to Elsie, Perkins County, Nebraska and then to Lincoln, Nebraska. Johnson attended Lincoln High School under the tutelage of William Jennings Bryan, who was serving as a substitute teacher. After graduation in 1903, Johnson pursued his dream of becoming a railroad man, and after numerous positions became a train dispatcher/telegrapher at Fairmont in Fillmore County in southeastern Nebraska. In 1909, Johnson contracted tuberculosis and was advised to relocate to Colorado, where the climate was believed helpful in his medical situation. After recovering from the disease he settled together with his wife near Craig, Colorado.

== Career ==
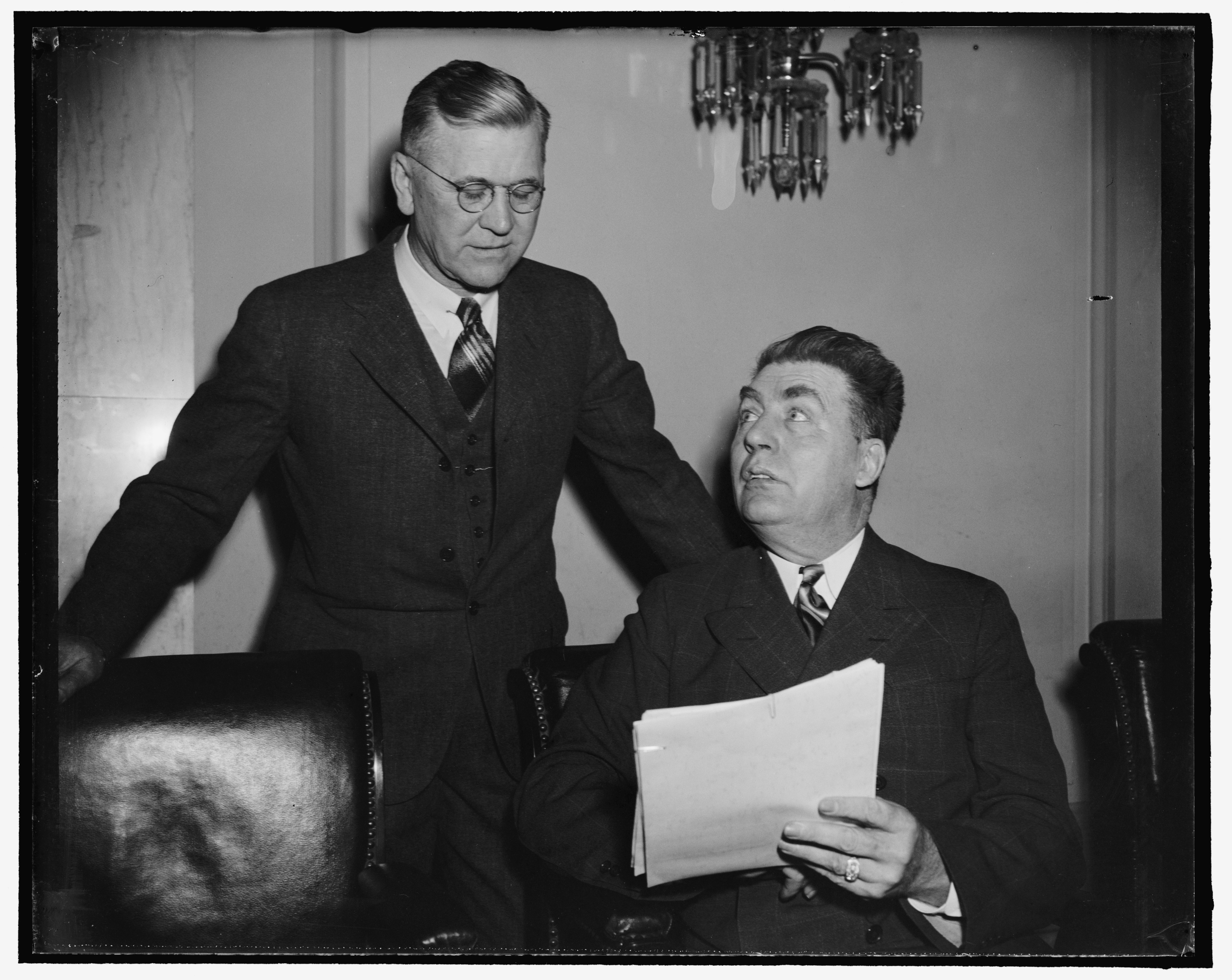
Johnson (seated) questions Alabama attorney J. Haden Alldredge on the latter's qualifications for the Interstate Commerce Commission, March 8, 1939

Beginning in 1923, Johnson served in the Colorado House of Representatives for four terms. He was lieutenant governor from 1931 to 1933. He represented Colorado for three terms in the United States Senate from 1937 until 1955, during which time from 1937 to 1940 he was an intraparty critic of the New Deal policies of U.S. President Franklin D. Roosevelt. In 1946 Johnson was Chairman of the Senate Committee examining the progress of demobilization from WWII. In response to widespread protests by G.I.'s, he stated that with the exception of troops in Germany and Japan, troops such as in India, Burma, Java and the Philippine Island should be brought home at once. Johnson served as the 26th and 34th governor of Colorado from January 10, 1933 until January 1, 1937 and from January 11, 1955 until January 8, 1957. He opposed FDR’s New Deal policies.

=== Ingrid Bergman incident ===
He was perhaps best known for presenting a speech on March 14, 1950, on the Senate floor, criticizing the extramarital affair of actress Ingrid Bergman, who at the time was married to Petter Lindström. Bergman's affair with Italian director Roberto Rossellini became a cause célèbre as a result of Johnson's speech, forcing her to relocate to Europe for several years. Johnson then proposed a bill where movies would be licensed based on the perceived morality of the actors/actresses and stated that Bergman “had perpetrated an assault upon the institution of marriage,” and called her “a powerful influence for evil.”

Prior to the discovery of her affair, Ingrid Bergman had been Johnson’s favorite actress. He felt that he had been deceived by the incident, and wished to ban her from any future Hollywood productions.

Bergman returned to Hollywood in the 1956 blockbuster film Anastasia. In 1972, Senator Charles H. Percy of Illinois entered an apology into the Congressional Record for Johnson’s attack, which had been made on Bergman twenty-two years earlier.

=== Atomic bombs ===
Johnson is also known for the alternative he presented to mankind in November 1945: "God Almighty in His infinite wisdom [has] dropped the atomic bomb in our lap." Now for the first time the United States, "with vision and guts and plenty of atomic bombs," could "compel mankind to adopt the policy of lasting peace … or be burned to a crisp."

On a November 1st, 1949, broadcast of the television talk show Court of Current Issues, Johnson made the first public reference to the debate over whether the United States should develop a "superbomb", that is, a thermonuclear weapon.

=== Zionism ===
Johnson was a Zionist who supported the establishment of Israel.

== Sport affiliations ==
Johnson was also the President of the Western League, a Class A baseball league, from 1947 to 1955. He was instrumental in the construction of Bears Stadium / Mile High Stadium, and was inducted in 1968 into the Colorado Sports Hall of Fame.

== Death and legacy ==
He died at Saint Joseph Hospital in Denver and is interred at the Fairmount Mausoleum at Fairmount Cemetery in Denver. The eastbound bore of the Eisenhower-Johnson Memorial Tunnel is named for Johnson.

== Other sources ==
- McCarthy, William T. Horse Sense: The Divided Politics of Edwin C. Johnson, 1923 - 1954 (Greeley, Co.: University of Northern Colorado, Unpublished Masters Thesis, 1996)
- McCarty, Patrick Fargo Big Ed Johnson: A Political Portrait (Boulder, Co.: University of Colorado, Unpublished Master's Thesis, 1958)

Party political offices
Preceded by Billy Adams	Democratic nominee for Governor of Colorado; 1932, 1934	Succeeded by Teller Ammons
Preceded by Edward P. Costigan	Democratic nominee for U.S. Senator from Colorado (Class 2); 1936, 1942, 1948	Succeeded by John A. Carroll
Preceded by John W. Metzger	Democratic nominee for Governor of Colorado; 1954	Succeeded by Stephen McNichols
Political offices
Preceded by George Milton Corlett	Lieutenant Governor of Colorado; 1931–1933	Succeeded by Ray Herbert Talbot
Preceded by William Herbert Adams	Governor of Colorado; 1933–1937	Succeeded by Ray Herbert Talbot
Preceded by Dan Thornton	Governor of Colorado; 1955–1957	Succeeded by Stephen L.R. McNichols
U.S. Senate
Preceded by Edward P. Costigan	U.S. senator (Class 2) from Colorado; 1937–1955; Served alongside: Alva B. Adams, Eugene D. Millikin	Succeeded by Gordon L. Allott
Preceded by Wallace H. White	Ranking Member of the Senate Interstate and Foreign Commerce Committee; 1947–1949	Succeeded by Charles W. Tobey
Preceded by Wallace H. White	Chair of the Senate Interstate and Foreign Commerce Committee; 1947–1953	Succeeded by Charles W. Tobey
Preceded by Charles W. Tobey	Ranking Member of the Senate Interstate and Foreign Commerce Committee; 1953–1955	Succeeded by John W. Bricker
