= List of United States Senate elections in Colorado =

United States Senate elections in Colorado occur when voters in the U.S. state of Colorado select an individual to represent the state in the United States Senate in either of the state's two seats allotted by the Constitution. Regularly scheduled general elections occur on Election Day, coinciding with various other federal, statewide, and local races.

Each state is allotted two U.S. Senators elected to staggered six-year terms, which were originally selected by the state legislature. The Senate is divided into three classes to stagger the terms of its members such that one-third of the Senate would be up for re-election every two years. Upon Colorado's admission to the Union in 1876, the state was assigned a Class 2 seat and a Class 3 seat, first elected in 1876. Since the passage of the Seventeenth Amendment in 1913, U.S. Senators are elected directly by the voters of each state. Special elections may be held to fill mid-term vacancies to elect an individual to serve the remainder of the unexpired term.

The list below contains results from all U.S. Senate elections held in Colorado after the passage of the Seventeenth Amendment, sorted by year. The next scheduled election for the Class 2 seat is in 2026, while the Class 3 seat will hold its next election in 2028.

== List of recent elections ==
=== Class 2 ===
Year	Winner				Runner(s)-up				Others		Ref
Year	Candidate	Party	Votes	%	Candidate	Party	Votes	%	Votes	%	Ref
1918	Lawrence C. Phipps	Republican	107,726	49.49%	John F. Shafroth	Democratic	104,347	47.94%	5,606	2.58%	
1924	Lawrence C. Phipps*	Republican	159,698	50.19%	Alva B. Adams	Democratic	139,660	43.89%	2,772	0.87%	
1924	Lawrence C. Phipps*	Republican	159,698	50.19%	Morton Alexander	Farmer–Labor	16,039	5.04%	2,772	0.87%	
1930	Edward P. Costigan	Democratic	180,028	55.85%	George H. Shaw	Republican	137,487	42.65%	4,826	1.50%	
1936	Edwin C. Johnson	Democratic	299,376	63.45%	Raymond Sauter	Republican	166,308	35.25%	6,143	1.30%	
1942	Edwin C. Johnson*	Democratic	174,612	50.23%	Ralph Lawrence Carr	Republican	170,970	49.19%	2,014	0.58%	
1948	Edwin C. Johnson*	Democratic	340,719	66.79%	Will Nicholson	Republican	165,069	32.36%	4,333	0.85%	
1954	Gordon Allott	Republican	248,502	51.32%	John A. Carroll	Democratic	235,686	48.68%			
1960	Gordon Allott*	Republican	389,428	53.75%	Robert Lee Knous	Democratic	331,752	45.79%	3,351	0.46%	
1966	Gordon Allott*	Republican	368,307	58.02%	Roy Romer	Democratic	266,198	41.93%	332	0.05%	
1972	Floyd Haskell	Democratic	457,545	49.41%	Gordon Allott*	Republican	447,957	48.37%	20,581	2.22%	
1978	William L. Armstrong	Republican	480,801	58.69%	Floyd Haskell*	Democratic	330,148	40.30%	8,307	1.01%	
1984	William L. Armstrong*	Republican	833,821	64.25%	Nancy Dick	Democratic	449,327	34.62%	3,584	0.28%	
1990	Hank Brown	Republican	569,048	55.68%	Josie Heath	Democratic	425,746	41.66%	27,233	2.66%	
1996	Wayne Allard	Republican	750,325	51.06%	Tom Strickland	Democratic	677,600	46.11%	41,686	2.84%	
2002	Wayne Allard*	Republican	717,893	50.70%	Tom Strickland	Democratic	648,130	45.77%	50,059	3.53%	
2008	Mark Udall	Democratic	1,231,049	52.80%	Bob Schaffer	Republican	990,784	42.49%	109,879	4.71%	
2014	Cory Gardner	Republican	983,891	48.20%	Mark Udall*	Democratic	944,203	46.26%	112,964	5.53%	
2020	John Hickenlooper	Democratic	1,731,114	53.50%	Cory Gardner*	Republican	1,429,492	44.18%	75,184	2.32%	

County results of Class 2 elections since 2002

2002
Allard vs. Strickland

2008
Udall vs. Schaffer

2014
Gardner vs. Udall

2020
Hickenlooper vs. Gardner

=== Class 3 ===
Year	Winner				Runner(s)-up				Others		Ref
Year	Candidate	Party	Votes	%	Candidate	Party	Votes	%	Votes	%	Ref
1914	Charles S. Thomas	Democratic	102,037	40.30%	Hubert Work	Republican	98,728	38.99%	11,433	4.52%	
1914	Charles S. Thomas	Democratic	102,037	40.30%	Benjamin Griffith	Progressive	27,072	10.69%	11,433	4.52%	
1914	Charles S. Thomas	Democratic	102,037	40.30%	J. C. Griffiths	Socialist	13,943	5.51%	11,433	4.52%	
1920	Samuel D. Nicholson	Republican	156,577	54.52%	Tully Scott	Democratic	112,890	39.31%	17,706	6.17%	
1924 (sp)	Rice W. Means	Republican	159,353	50.17%	Morrison Shafroth	Democratic	138,714	43.67%	2,012	0.63%	
1924 (sp)	Rice W. Means	Republican	159,353	50.17%	Charles T. Philip	Farmer–Labor	17,542	5.52%	2,012	0.63%	
1926	Charles W. Waterman	Republican	149,585	50.25%	William Ellery Sweet	Democratic	138,113	46.39%	9,997	3.36%	
1932 (sp)	Karl C. Schuyler	Republican	207,540	48.76%	Walter Walker	Democratic	206,475	48.51%	11,619	2.73%	
1932	Alva B. Adams	Democratic	226,516	51.91%	Karl C. Schuyler*	Republican	198,519	45.50%	11,304	2.59%	
1938	Alva B. Adams*	Democratic	262,786	58.24%	Archibald A. Lee	Republican	181,297	40.18%	7,126	1.58%	
1942 (sp)	Eugene Millikin	Republican	191,517	56.12%	James A. Marsh	Democratic	143,817	42.14%	5,926	1.74%	
1944	Eugene Millikin*	Republican	277,410	56.06%	Barney L. Whatley	Democratic	214,335	43.31%	3,143	0.64%	
1950	Eugene Millikin*	Republican	239,724	53.25%	John A. Carroll	Democratic	210,442	46.75%			
1956	John A. Carroll	Democratic	319,872	50.22%	Daniel I. J. Thornton	Republican	317,102	49.78%			
1962	Peter H. Dominick	Republican	328,655	53.58%	John A. Carroll*	Democratic	279,586	45.58%	5,203	0.85%	
1968	Peter H. Dominick*	Republican	459,952	58.55%	Stephen McNichols	Democratic	325,584	41.45%			
1974	Gary Hart	Democratic	471,688	57.23%	Peter H. Dominick*	Republican	325,526	39.50%	26,957	3.27%	
1980	Gary Hart*	Democratic	590,501	50.33%	Mary Estill Buchanan	Republican	571,295	48.7%	11,346	0.97%	
1986	Tim Wirth	Democratic	529,449	49.91%	Ken Kramer	Republican	512,994	48.36%	18,322	1.73%	
1992	Ben Nighthorse Campbell	Democratic	803,725	51.78%	Terry Considine	Republican	662,893	42.70%	85,671	5.52%	
1998	Ben Nighthorse Campbell*	Republican	829,370	62.49%	Dottie Lamm	Democratic	464,754	35.02%	33,111	2.49%	
2004	Ken Salazar	Democratic	1,081,188	51.30%	Pete Coors	Republican	980,668	46.53%	45,698	2.17%	
2010	Michael Bennet*	Democratic	854,685	48.08%	Ken Buck	Republican	824,789	46.40%	98,194	5.52%	
2016	Michael Bennet*	Democratic	1,370,710	49.97%	Darryl Glenn	Republican	1,215,318	44.31%	157,001	5.72%	
2022	Michael Bennet*	Democratic	1,397,170	55.88%	Joe O'Dea	Republican	1,031,693	41.26%	71,338	2.85%	

County results of Class 3 elections since 2004

2004
Salazar vs. Coors

2010
Bennet vs. Buck

2016
Bennet vs. Glenn

2022
Bennet vs. O'Dea

== See also ==
- List of United States senators from Colorado
- List of United States presidential elections in Colorado
- Elections in Colorado
