= List of United States senators from Colorado =

Current delegation

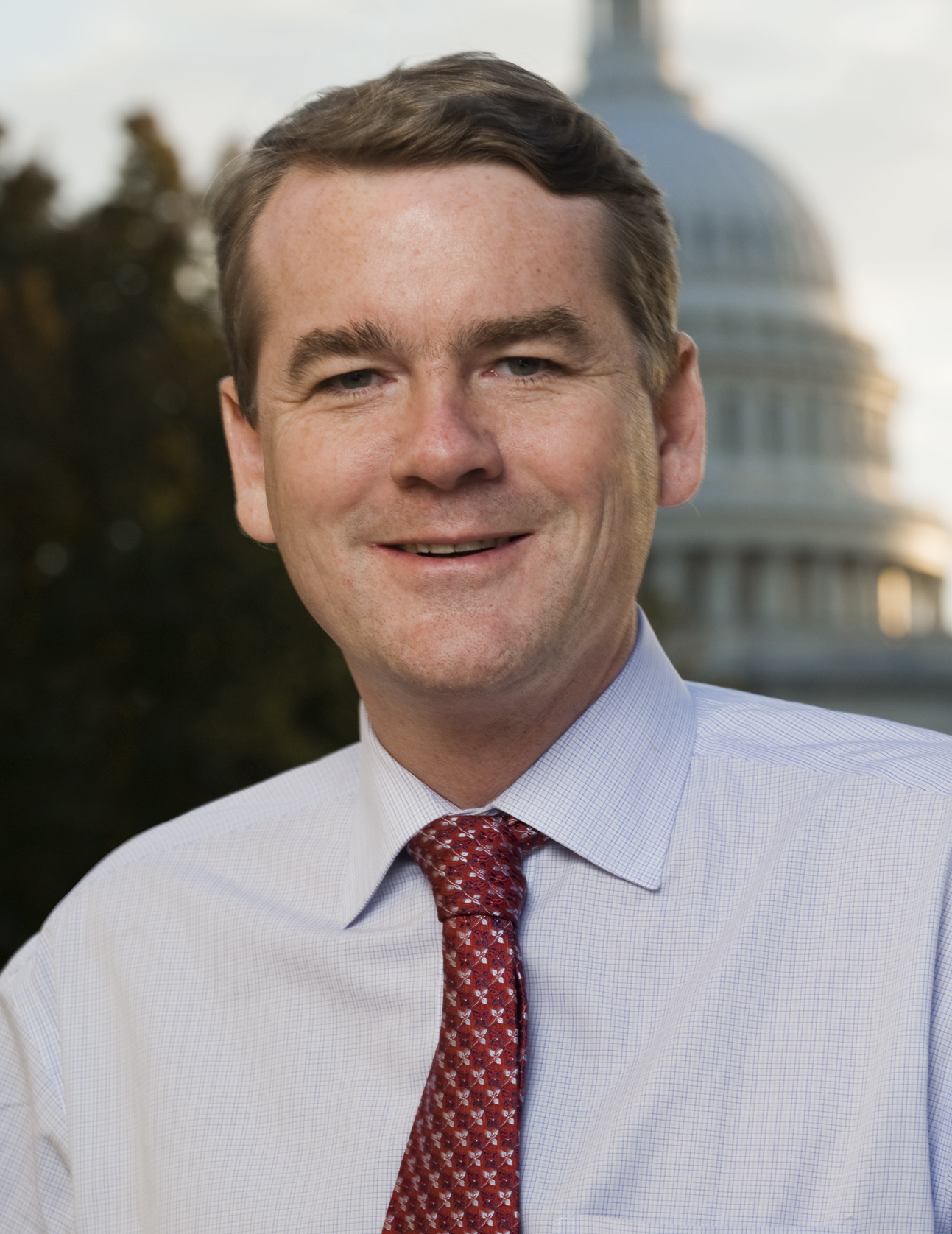
Michael Bennet (D)

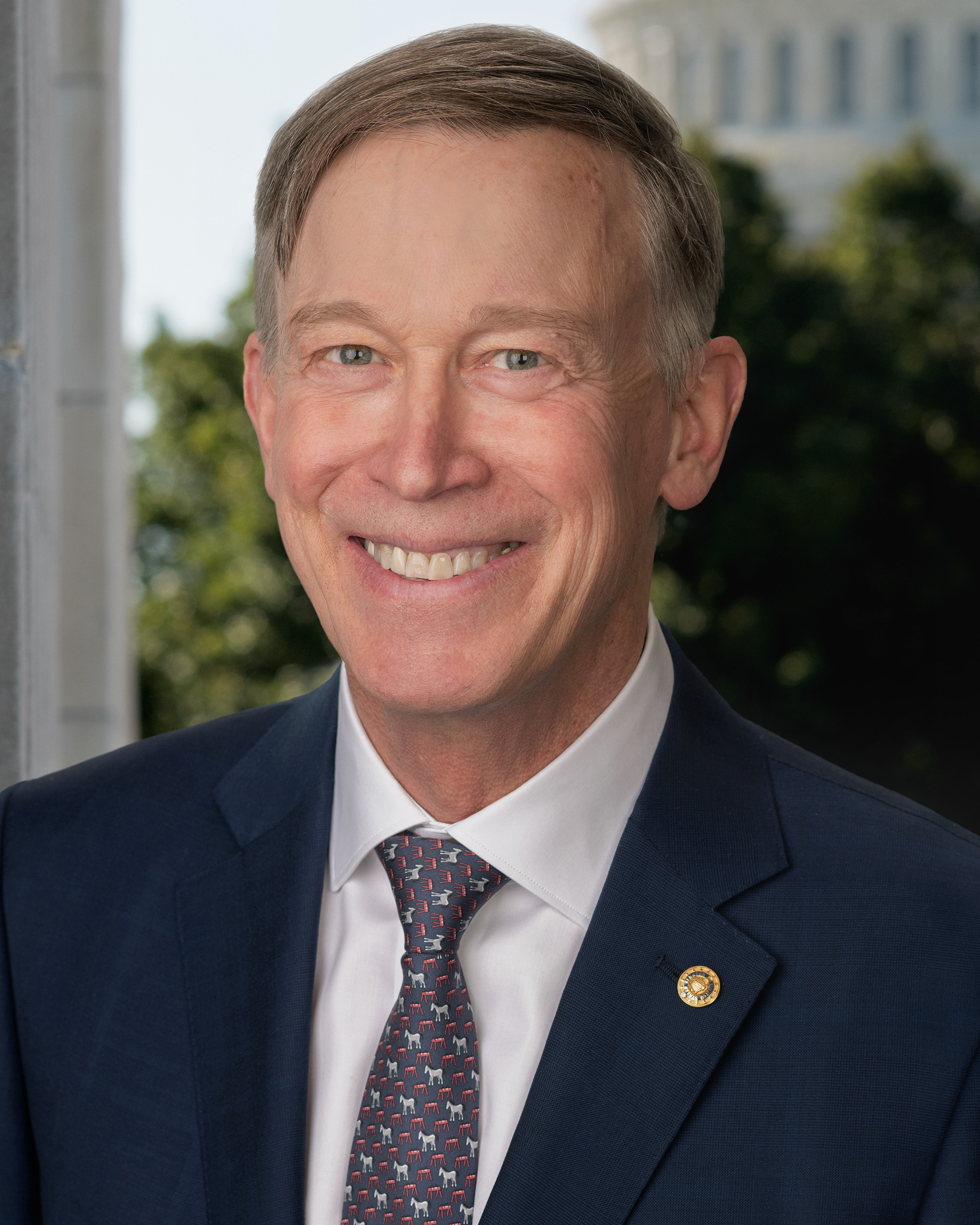
John Hickenlooper (D)

(ordered by seniority)

Colorado was admitted to the Union on August 1, 1876 and elects U.S. senators to Senate class 2 and class 3.

Both of Colorado's current U.S. senators are Democrats Michael Bennet (serving since 2009) and John Hickenlooper (serving since 2021).

Henry M. Teller was Colorado's longest-serving senator (1876–1882; 1885–1909).

== List of senators ==
Class 2 Class 2 senators belong to the electoral cycle that most recently had regular elections in 2008, 2014, 2020, and 2026. The next election will be in 2032.						C	Class 3 Class 3 senators belong to the electoral cycle that most recently had regular elections in 2004, 2010, 2016, and 2022. The next election will be in 2028.					
#	Senator	Party	Dates in office	Electoral history	T	C	T	Electoral history	Dates in office	Party	Senator	#
Vacant			Aug 1, 1876 – Nov 15, 1876	Colorado did not elect its senators until three months after statehood.	1	44th	1	Colorado did not elect its senators until three months after statehood.	Aug 1, 1876 – Nov 15, 1876	Vacant		
1	Henry M. Teller (Central City)	Republican	Nov 15, 1876 – Apr 17, 1882	Elected in 1876.	1	44th	1	Elected in 1876. Retired.	Nov 15, 1876 – Mar 3, 1879	Republican	Jerome B. Chaffee (Denver)	1
1	Henry M. Teller (Central City)	Republican	Nov 15, 1876 – Apr 17, 1882	Elected to next term in 1876 or 1877. Resigned to become U.S. Secretary of the Interior.	2	45th	1	Elected in 1876. Retired.	Nov 15, 1876 – Mar 3, 1879	Republican	Jerome B. Chaffee (Denver)	1
1	Henry M. Teller (Central City)	Republican	Nov 15, 1876 – Apr 17, 1882	Elected to next term in 1876 or 1877. Resigned to become U.S. Secretary of the Interior.	2	46th	2	Elected in 1879. Lost re-nomination.	Mar 4, 1879 – Mar 3, 1885	Republican	Nathaniel P. Hill (Denver)	2
1	Henry M. Teller (Central City)	Republican	Nov 15, 1876 – Apr 17, 1882	Elected to next term in 1876 or 1877. Resigned to become U.S. Secretary of the Interior.	2	47th	2	Elected in 1879. Lost re-nomination.	Mar 4, 1879 – Mar 3, 1885	Republican	Nathaniel P. Hill (Denver)	2
2	George M. Chilcott (Denver)	Republican	Apr 17, 1882 – Jan 27, 1883	Appointed to continue Teller's term. Did not run to finish the term.	2	47th	2	Elected in 1879. Lost re-nomination.	Mar 4, 1879 – Mar 3, 1885	Republican	Nathaniel P. Hill (Denver)	2
3	Horace Tabor (Denver)	Republican	Jan 27, 1883 – Mar 3, 1883	Elected to finish Teller's term. Retired.	2	47th	2	Elected in 1879. Lost re-nomination.	Mar 4, 1879 – Mar 3, 1885	Republican	Nathaniel P. Hill (Denver)	2
4	Thomas M. Bowen (Del Norte)	Republican	Mar 4, 1883 – Mar 3, 1889	Election date unknown. Unknown if retired or lost re-election.	3	48th	2	Elected in 1879. Lost re-nomination.	Mar 4, 1879 – Mar 3, 1885	Republican	Nathaniel P. Hill (Denver)	2
4	Thomas M. Bowen (Del Norte)	Republican	Mar 4, 1883 – Mar 3, 1889	Election date unknown. Unknown if retired or lost re-election.	3	49th	3	Elected in 1885.	Mar 4, 1885 – Mar 3, 1909	Republican	Henry M. Teller (Central City)	3
4	Thomas M. Bowen (Del Norte)	Republican	Mar 4, 1883 – Mar 3, 1889	Election date unknown. Unknown if retired or lost re-election.	3	50th	3	Elected in 1885.	Mar 4, 1885 – Mar 3, 1909	Republican	Henry M. Teller (Central City)	3
5	Edward O. Wolcott (Denver)	Republican	Mar 4, 1889 – Mar 3, 1901	Elected in 1889.	4	51st	3	Elected in 1885.	Mar 4, 1885 – Mar 3, 1909	Republican	Henry M. Teller (Central City)	3
5	Edward O. Wolcott (Denver)	Republican	Mar 4, 1889 – Mar 3, 1901	Elected in 1889.	4	52nd	4	Re-elected in 1891.	Mar 4, 1885 – Mar 3, 1909	Republican	Henry M. Teller (Central City)	3
5	Edward O. Wolcott (Denver)	Republican	Mar 4, 1889 – Mar 3, 1901	Elected in 1889.	4	53rd	4	Re-elected in 1891.	Mar 4, 1885 – Mar 3, 1909	Republican	Henry M. Teller (Central City)	3
5	Edward O. Wolcott (Denver)	Republican	Mar 4, 1889 – Mar 3, 1901	Re-elected in 1895. Lost re-election.	5	54th	4	Re-elected in 1891.	Mar 4, 1885 – Mar 3, 1909	Republican	Henry M. Teller (Central City)	3
5	Edward O. Wolcott (Denver)	Republican	Mar 4, 1889 – Mar 3, 1901	Re-elected in 1895. Lost re-election.	5	55th	5	Re-elected in 1897.	Mar 4, 1885 – Mar 3, 1909	Silver Republican	Henry M. Teller (Central City)	3
5	Edward O. Wolcott (Denver)	Republican	Mar 4, 1889 – Mar 3, 1901	Re-elected in 1895. Lost re-election.	5	56th	5	Re-elected in 1897.	Mar 4, 1885 – Mar 3, 1909	Silver Republican	Henry M. Teller (Central City)	3
6	Thomas M. Patterson (Denver)	Democratic	Mar 4, 1901 – Mar 3, 1907	Elected in 1901. Retired.	6	57th	5	Re-elected in 1897.	Mar 4, 1885 – Mar 3, 1909	Silver Republican	Henry M. Teller (Central City)	3
6	Thomas M. Patterson (Denver)	Democratic	Mar 4, 1901 – Mar 3, 1907	Elected in 1901. Retired.	6	58th	6	Re-elected in 1903. Retired.	Mar 4, 1885 – Mar 3, 1909	Democratic	Henry M. Teller (Central City)	3
6	Thomas M. Patterson (Denver)	Democratic	Mar 4, 1901 – Mar 3, 1907	Elected in 1901. Retired.	6	59th	6	Re-elected in 1903. Retired.	Mar 4, 1885 – Mar 3, 1909	Democratic	Henry M. Teller (Central City)	3
7	Simon Guggenheim (Denver)	Republican	Mar 4, 1907 – Mar 3, 1913	Elected in 1907. Retired.	7	60th	6	Re-elected in 1903. Retired.	Mar 4, 1885 – Mar 3, 1909	Democratic	Henry M. Teller (Central City)	3
7	Simon Guggenheim (Denver)	Republican	Mar 4, 1907 – Mar 3, 1913	Elected in 1907. Retired.	7	61st	7	Elected in 1909. Died.	Mar 4, 1909 – Jan 11, 1911	Democratic	Charles J. Hughes Jr. (Denver)	4
7	Simon Guggenheim (Denver)	Republican	Mar 4, 1907 – Mar 3, 1913	Elected in 1907. Retired.	7	61st	7		Jan 11, 1911 – Jan 15, 1913	Vacant		
7	Simon Guggenheim (Denver)	Republican	Mar 4, 1907 – Mar 3, 1913	Elected in 1907. Retired.	7	62nd	7		Jan 11, 1911 – Jan 15, 1913	Vacant		
7	Simon Guggenheim (Denver)	Republican	Mar 4, 1907 – Mar 3, 1913	Elected in 1907. Retired.	7	62nd	7	Elected to finish Hughes's term.	Jan 15, 1913 – Mar 3, 1921	Democratic	Charles S. Thomas (Denver)	5
8	John F. Shafroth (Denver)	Democratic	Mar 4, 1913 – Mar 3, 1919	Elected in 1913. Lost re-election.	8	63rd	7	Elected to finish Hughes's term.	Jan 15, 1913 – Mar 3, 1921	Democratic	Charles S. Thomas (Denver)	5
8	John F. Shafroth (Denver)	Democratic	Mar 4, 1913 – Mar 3, 1919	Elected in 1913. Lost re-election.	8	64th	8	Re-elected in 1914. Lost re-election.	Jan 15, 1913 – Mar 3, 1921	Democratic	Charles S. Thomas (Denver)	5
8	John F. Shafroth (Denver)	Democratic	Mar 4, 1913 – Mar 3, 1919	Elected in 1913. Lost re-election.	8	65th	8	Re-elected in 1914. Lost re-election.	Jan 15, 1913 – Mar 3, 1921	Democratic	Charles S. Thomas (Denver)	5
9	Lawrence C. Phipps (Denver)	Republican	Mar 4, 1919 – Mar 3, 1931	Elected in 1918.	9	66th	8	Re-elected in 1914. Lost re-election.	Jan 15, 1913 – Mar 3, 1921	Democratic	Charles S. Thomas (Denver)	5
9	Lawrence C. Phipps (Denver)	Republican	Mar 4, 1919 – Mar 3, 1931	Elected in 1918.	9	67th	9	Elected in 1920. Died.	Mar 4, 1921 – Mar 24, 1923	Republican	Samuel D. Nicholson (Leadville)	6
9	Lawrence C. Phipps (Denver)	Republican	Mar 4, 1919 – Mar 3, 1931	Elected in 1918.	9	68th	9	Elected in 1920. Died.	Mar 4, 1921 – Mar 24, 1923	Republican	Samuel D. Nicholson (Leadville)	6
9	Lawrence C. Phipps (Denver)	Republican	Mar 4, 1919 – Mar 3, 1931	Elected in 1918.	9	68th	9		Mar 24, 1923 – May 17, 1923	Vacant		
9	Lawrence C. Phipps (Denver)	Republican	Mar 4, 1919 – Mar 3, 1931	Elected in 1918.	9	68th	9	Appointed to continue Nicholson's term. Retired.	May 17, 1923 – Nov 30, 1924	Democratic	Alva B. Adams (Pueblo)	7
9	Lawrence C. Phipps (Denver)	Republican	Mar 4, 1919 – Mar 3, 1931	Elected in 1918.	9	68th	9	Elected to finish Nicholson's term. Lost renomination.	Dec 1, 1924 – Mar 3, 1927	Republican	Rice W. Means (Denver)	8
9	Lawrence C. Phipps (Denver)	Republican	Mar 4, 1919 – Mar 3, 1931	Re-elected in 1924. Retired.	10	69th	9	Elected to finish Nicholson's term. Lost renomination.	Dec 1, 1924 – Mar 3, 1927	Republican	Rice W. Means (Denver)	8
9	Lawrence C. Phipps (Denver)	Republican	Mar 4, 1919 – Mar 3, 1931	Re-elected in 1924. Retired.	10	70th	10	Elected in 1926. Died.	Mar 4, 1927 – Aug 27, 1932	Republican	Charles W. Waterman (Denver)	9
9	Lawrence C. Phipps (Denver)	Republican	Mar 4, 1919 – Mar 3, 1931	Re-elected in 1924. Retired.	10	71st	10	Elected in 1926. Died.	Mar 4, 1927 – Aug 27, 1932	Republican	Charles W. Waterman (Denver)	9
10	Edward P. Costigan (Denver)	Democratic	Mar 4, 1931 – Jan 3, 1937	Elected in 1930. Retired.	11	72nd	10	Elected in 1926. Died.	Mar 4, 1927 – Aug 27, 1932	Republican	Charles W. Waterman (Denver)	9
10	Edward P. Costigan (Denver)	Democratic	Mar 4, 1931 – Jan 3, 1937	Elected in 1930. Retired.	11	72nd	10		Aug 27, 1932 – Sep 26, 1932	Vacant		
10	Edward P. Costigan (Denver)	Democratic	Mar 4, 1931 – Jan 3, 1937	Elected in 1930. Retired.	11	72nd	10	Appointed to continue Waterman's term. Lost election to finish Waterman's term.	Sep 26, 1932 – Dec 6, 1932	Democratic	Walter Walker (Grand Junction)	10
10	Edward P. Costigan (Denver)	Democratic	Mar 4, 1931 – Jan 3, 1937	Elected in 1930. Retired.	11	72nd	10	Elected to finish Waterman's term. Lost election to next term.	Dec 7, 1932 – Mar 3, 1933	Republican	Karl C. Schuyler (Denver)	11
10	Edward P. Costigan (Denver)	Democratic	Mar 4, 1931 – Jan 3, 1937	Elected in 1930. Retired.	11	73rd	11	Elected in 1932.	Mar 4, 1933 – Dec 1, 1941	Democratic	Alva B. Adams (Pueblo)	12
10	Edward P. Costigan (Denver)	Democratic	Mar 4, 1931 – Jan 3, 1937	Elected in 1930. Retired.	11	74th	11	Elected in 1932.	Mar 4, 1933 – Dec 1, 1941	Democratic	Alva B. Adams (Pueblo)	12
11	Edwin C. Johnson (Craig)	Democratic	Jan 3, 1937 – Jan 3, 1955	Elected in 1936.	12	75th	11	Elected in 1932.	Mar 4, 1933 – Dec 1, 1941	Democratic	Alva B. Adams (Pueblo)	12
11	Edwin C. Johnson (Craig)	Democratic	Jan 3, 1937 – Jan 3, 1955	Elected in 1936.	12	76th	12	Re-elected in 1938. Died.	Mar 4, 1933 – Dec 1, 1941	Democratic	Alva B. Adams (Pueblo)	12
11	Edwin C. Johnson (Craig)	Democratic	Jan 3, 1937 – Jan 3, 1955	Elected in 1936.	12	77th	12	Re-elected in 1938. Died.	Mar 4, 1933 – Dec 1, 1941	Democratic	Alva B. Adams (Pueblo)	12
11	Edwin C. Johnson (Craig)	Democratic	Jan 3, 1937 – Jan 3, 1955	Elected in 1936.	12	77th	12		Dec 1, 1941 – Dec 20, 1941	Vacant		
11	Edwin C. Johnson (Craig)	Democratic	Jan 3, 1937 – Jan 3, 1955	Elected in 1936.	12	77th	12	Appointed to continue Adams's term. Elected in 1942 to finish Adams's term.	Dec 20, 1941 – Jan 3, 1957	Republican	Eugene Millikin (Denver)	13
11	Edwin C. Johnson (Craig)	Democratic	Jan 3, 1937 – Jan 3, 1955	Re-elected in 1942.	13	78th	12	Appointed to continue Adams's term. Elected in 1942 to finish Adams's term.	Dec 20, 1941 – Jan 3, 1957	Republican	Eugene Millikin (Denver)	13
11	Edwin C. Johnson (Craig)	Democratic	Jan 3, 1937 – Jan 3, 1955	Re-elected in 1942.	13	79th	13	Re-elected in 1944.	Dec 20, 1941 – Jan 3, 1957	Republican	Eugene Millikin (Denver)	13
11	Edwin C. Johnson (Craig)	Democratic	Jan 3, 1937 – Jan 3, 1955	Re-elected in 1942.	13	80th	13	Re-elected in 1944.	Dec 20, 1941 – Jan 3, 1957	Republican	Eugene Millikin (Denver)	13
11	Edwin C. Johnson (Craig)	Democratic	Jan 3, 1937 – Jan 3, 1955	Re-elected in 1948. Retired to run for Governor.	14	81st	13	Re-elected in 1944.	Dec 20, 1941 – Jan 3, 1957	Republican	Eugene Millikin (Denver)	13
11	Edwin C. Johnson (Craig)	Democratic	Jan 3, 1937 – Jan 3, 1955	Re-elected in 1948. Retired to run for Governor.	14	82nd	14	Re-elected in 1950. Retired	Dec 20, 1941 – Jan 3, 1957	Republican	Eugene Millikin (Denver)	13
11	Edwin C. Johnson (Craig)	Democratic	Jan 3, 1937 – Jan 3, 1955	Re-elected in 1948. Retired to run for Governor.	14	83rd	14	Re-elected in 1950. Retired	Dec 20, 1941 – Jan 3, 1957	Republican	Eugene Millikin (Denver)	13
12	Gordon Allott (Lamar)	Republican	Jan 3, 1955 – Jan 3, 1973	Elected in 1954.	15	84th	14	Re-elected in 1950. Retired	Dec 20, 1941 – Jan 3, 1957	Republican	Eugene Millikin (Denver)	13
12	Gordon Allott (Lamar)	Republican	Jan 3, 1955 – Jan 3, 1973	Elected in 1954.	15	85th	15	Elected in 1956. Lost re-election.	Jan 3, 1957 – Jan 3, 1963	Democratic	John A. Carroll (Denver)	14
12	Gordon Allott (Lamar)	Republican	Jan 3, 1955 – Jan 3, 1973	Elected in 1954.	15	86th	15	Elected in 1956. Lost re-election.	Jan 3, 1957 – Jan 3, 1963	Democratic	John A. Carroll (Denver)	14
12	Gordon Allott (Lamar)	Republican	Jan 3, 1955 – Jan 3, 1973	Re-elected in 1960.	16	87th	15	Elected in 1956. Lost re-election.	Jan 3, 1957 – Jan 3, 1963	Democratic	John A. Carroll (Denver)	14
12	Gordon Allott (Lamar)	Republican	Jan 3, 1955 – Jan 3, 1973	Re-elected in 1960.	16	88th	16	Elected in 1962.	Jan 3, 1963 – Jan 3, 1975	Republican	Peter H. Dominick (Englewood)	15
12	Gordon Allott (Lamar)	Republican	Jan 3, 1955 – Jan 3, 1973	Re-elected in 1960.	16	89th	16	Elected in 1962.	Jan 3, 1963 – Jan 3, 1975	Republican	Peter H. Dominick (Englewood)	15
12	Gordon Allott (Lamar)	Republican	Jan 3, 1955 – Jan 3, 1973	Re-elected in 1966. Lost re-election.	17	90th	16	Elected in 1962.	Jan 3, 1963 – Jan 3, 1975	Republican	Peter H. Dominick (Englewood)	15
12	Gordon Allott (Lamar)	Republican	Jan 3, 1955 – Jan 3, 1973	Re-elected in 1966. Lost re-election.	17	91st	17	Re-elected in 1968. Lost re-election.	Jan 3, 1963 – Jan 3, 1975	Republican	Peter H. Dominick (Englewood)	15
12	Gordon Allott (Lamar)	Republican	Jan 3, 1955 – Jan 3, 1973	Re-elected in 1966. Lost re-election.	17	92nd	17	Re-elected in 1968. Lost re-election.	Jan 3, 1963 – Jan 3, 1975	Republican	Peter H. Dominick (Englewood)	15
13	Floyd Haskell (Littleton)	Democratic	Jan 3, 1973 – Jan 3, 1979	Elected in 1972. Lost re-election.	18	93rd	17	Re-elected in 1968. Lost re-election.	Jan 3, 1963 – Jan 3, 1975	Republican	Peter H. Dominick (Englewood)	15
13	Floyd Haskell (Littleton)	Democratic	Jan 3, 1973 – Jan 3, 1979	Elected in 1972. Lost re-election.	18	94th	18	Elected in 1974.	Jan 3, 1975 – Jan 3, 1987	Democratic	Gary Hart (Denver)	16
13	Floyd Haskell (Littleton)	Democratic	Jan 3, 1973 – Jan 3, 1979	Elected in 1972. Lost re-election.	18	95th	18	Elected in 1974.	Jan 3, 1975 – Jan 3, 1987	Democratic	Gary Hart (Denver)	16
14	William L. Armstrong (Englewood)	Republican	Jan 3, 1979 – Jan 3, 1991	Elected in 1978.	19	96th	18	Elected in 1974.	Jan 3, 1975 – Jan 3, 1987	Democratic	Gary Hart (Denver)	16
14	William L. Armstrong (Englewood)	Republican	Jan 3, 1979 – Jan 3, 1991	Elected in 1978.	19	97th	19	Re-elected in 1980. Retired.	Jan 3, 1975 – Jan 3, 1987	Democratic	Gary Hart (Denver)	16
14	William L. Armstrong (Englewood)	Republican	Jan 3, 1979 – Jan 3, 1991	Elected in 1978.	19	98th	19	Re-elected in 1980. Retired.	Jan 3, 1975 – Jan 3, 1987	Democratic	Gary Hart (Denver)	16
14	William L. Armstrong (Englewood)	Republican	Jan 3, 1979 – Jan 3, 1991	Re-elected in 1984. Retired.	20	99th	19	Re-elected in 1980. Retired.	Jan 3, 1975 – Jan 3, 1987	Democratic	Gary Hart (Denver)	16
14	William L. Armstrong (Englewood)	Republican	Jan 3, 1979 – Jan 3, 1991	Re-elected in 1984. Retired.	20	100th	20	Elected in 1986. Retired.	Jan 3, 1987 – Jan 3, 1993	Democratic	Tim Wirth (Boulder)	17
14	William L. Armstrong (Englewood)	Republican	Jan 3, 1979 – Jan 3, 1991	Re-elected in 1984. Retired.	20	101st	20	Elected in 1986. Retired.	Jan 3, 1987 – Jan 3, 1993	Democratic	Tim Wirth (Boulder)	17
15	Hank Brown (Greeley)	Republican	Jan 3, 1991 – Jan 3, 1997	Elected in 1990. Retired.	21	102nd	20	Elected in 1986. Retired.	Jan 3, 1987 – Jan 3, 1993	Democratic	Tim Wirth (Boulder)	17
15	Hank Brown (Greeley)	Republican	Jan 3, 1991 – Jan 3, 1997	Elected in 1990. Retired.	21	103rd	21	Elected in 1992. Changed parties on March 3, 1995.	Jan 3, 1993 – Jan 3, 2005	Democratic	Ben Nighthorse Campbell (Ignacio)	18
15	Hank Brown (Greeley)	Republican	Jan 3, 1991 – Jan 3, 1997	Elected in 1990. Retired.	21	104th	21	Elected in 1992. Changed parties on March 3, 1995.	Jan 3, 1993 – Jan 3, 2005	Democratic	Ben Nighthorse Campbell (Ignacio)	18
15	Hank Brown (Greeley)	Republican	Jan 3, 1991 – Jan 3, 1997	Elected in 1990. Retired.	21	104th	21	Elected in 1992. Changed parties on March 3, 1995.	Jan 3, 1993 – Jan 3, 2005	Republican	Ben Nighthorse Campbell (Ignacio)	18
16	Wayne Allard (Loveland)	Republican	Jan 3, 1997 – Jan 3, 2009	Elected in 1996.	22	105th	21	Elected in 1992. Changed parties on March 3, 1995.	Jan 3, 1993 – Jan 3, 2005	Republican	Ben Nighthorse Campbell (Ignacio)	18
16	Wayne Allard (Loveland)	Republican	Jan 3, 1997 – Jan 3, 2009	Elected in 1996.	22	106th	22	Re-elected in 1998. Retired.	Jan 3, 1993 – Jan 3, 2005	Republican	Ben Nighthorse Campbell (Ignacio)	18
16	Wayne Allard (Loveland)	Republican	Jan 3, 1997 – Jan 3, 2009	Elected in 1996.	22	107th	22	Re-elected in 1998. Retired.	Jan 3, 1993 – Jan 3, 2005	Republican	Ben Nighthorse Campbell (Ignacio)	18
16	Wayne Allard (Loveland)	Republican	Jan 3, 1997 – Jan 3, 2009	Re-elected in 2002. Retired.	23	108th	22	Re-elected in 1998. Retired.	Jan 3, 1993 – Jan 3, 2005	Republican	Ben Nighthorse Campbell (Ignacio)	18
16	Wayne Allard (Loveland)	Republican	Jan 3, 1997 – Jan 3, 2009	Re-elected in 2002. Retired.	23	109th	23	Elected in 2004. Resigned to become U.S. Secretary of the Interior.	Jan 3, 2005 – Jan 20, 2009	Democratic	Ken Salazar (Denver)	19
16	Wayne Allard (Loveland)	Republican	Jan 3, 1997 – Jan 3, 2009	Re-elected in 2002. Retired.	23	110th	23	Elected in 2004. Resigned to become U.S. Secretary of the Interior.	Jan 3, 2005 – Jan 20, 2009	Democratic	Ken Salazar (Denver)	19
17	Mark Udall (Eldorado Springs)	Democratic	Jan 3, 2009 – Jan 3, 2015	Elected in 2008. Lost re-election.	24	111th	23	Elected in 2004. Resigned to become U.S. Secretary of the Interior.	Jan 3, 2005 – Jan 20, 2009	Democratic	Ken Salazar (Denver)	19
17	Mark Udall (Eldorado Springs)	Democratic	Jan 3, 2009 – Jan 3, 2015	Elected in 2008. Lost re-election.	24	111th	23	Appointed to finish Salazar's term.	Jan 21, 2009 – present	Democratic	Michael Bennet (Denver)	20
17	Mark Udall (Eldorado Springs)	Democratic	Jan 3, 2009 – Jan 3, 2015	Elected in 2008. Lost re-election.	24	112th	24	Elected to a full term in 2010.	Jan 21, 2009 – present	Democratic	Michael Bennet (Denver)	20
17	Mark Udall (Eldorado Springs)	Democratic	Jan 3, 2009 – Jan 3, 2015	Elected in 2008. Lost re-election.	24	113th	24	Elected to a full term in 2010.	Jan 21, 2009 – present	Democratic	Michael Bennet (Denver)	20
18	Cory Gardner (Yuma)	Republican	Jan 3, 2015 – Jan 3, 2021	Elected in 2014. Lost re-election.	25	114th	24	Elected to a full term in 2010.	Jan 21, 2009 – present	Democratic	Michael Bennet (Denver)	20
18	Cory Gardner (Yuma)	Republican	Jan 3, 2015 – Jan 3, 2021	Elected in 2014. Lost re-election.	25	115th	25	Re-elected in 2016.	Jan 21, 2009 – present	Democratic	Michael Bennet (Denver)	20
18	Cory Gardner (Yuma)	Republican	Jan 3, 2015 – Jan 3, 2021	Elected in 2014. Lost re-election.	25	116th	25	Re-elected in 2016.	Jan 21, 2009 – present	Democratic	Michael Bennet (Denver)	20
19	John Hickenlooper (Denver)	Democratic	Jan 3, 2021 – present	Elected in 2020.	26	117th	25	Re-elected in 2016.	Jan 21, 2009 – present	Democratic	Michael Bennet (Denver)	20
19	John Hickenlooper (Denver)	Democratic	Jan 3, 2021 – present	Elected in 2020.	26	118th	26	Re-elected in 2022.	Jan 21, 2009 – present	Democratic	Michael Bennet (Denver)	20
19	John Hickenlooper (Denver)	Democratic	Jan 3, 2021 – present	Elected in 2020.	26	119th	26	Re-elected in 2022.	Jan 21, 2009 – present	Democratic	Michael Bennet (Denver)	20
19	John Hickenlooper (Denver)	Democratic	Jan 3, 2021 – present	Re-elected in 2026. Retiring at the end of term.	27	120th	26	Re-elected in 2022.	Jan 21, 2009 – present	Democratic	Michael Bennet (Denver)	20
19	John Hickenlooper (Denver)	Democratic	Jan 3, 2021 – present	Re-elected in 2026. Retiring at the end of term.	27	121st	27	To be determined in the 2028 election.				
19	John Hickenlooper (Denver)	Democratic	Jan 3, 2021 – present	Re-elected in 2026. Retiring at the end of term.	27	122nd	27	To be determined in the 2028 election.				
To be determined in the 2032 election.					28	123rd	27	To be determined in the 2028 election.				

== See also ==
- Colorado's congressional delegations
- Elections in Colorado
- List of United States representatives from Colorado
