= 1924 United States Senate special election in Colorado =

- November 4, 1924
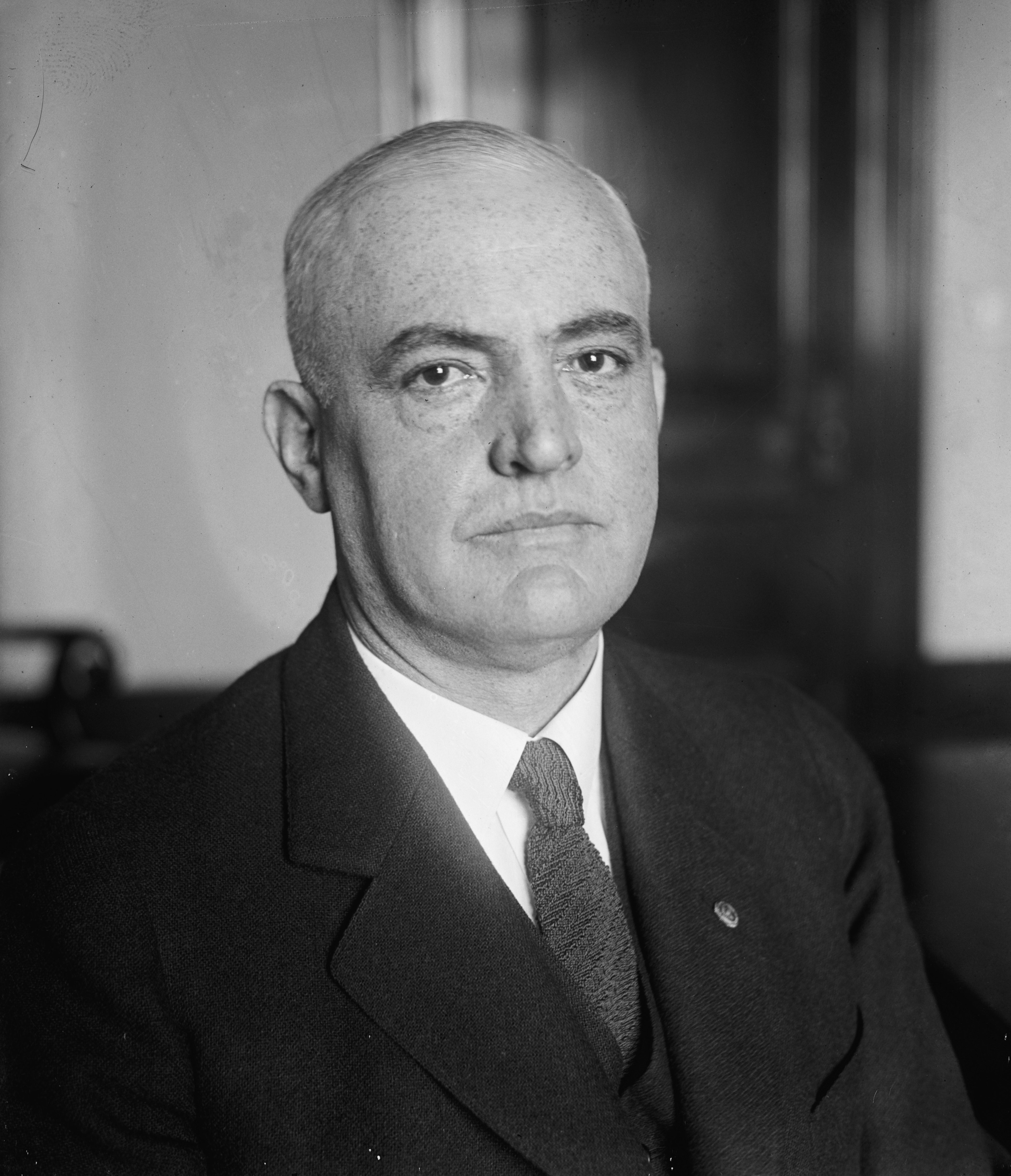

| Nominee | Rice W. Means | Morrison Shafroth | Charles T. Philp |
| Party | Republican | Democratic | Farmer–Labor |
| Popular vote | 159,353 | 138,714 | 17,542 |
| Percentage | 50.17% | 43.67% | 5.52% |
- County results Means: 40–50% 50–60% 60–70% Shafroth: 40–50% 50–60%
U.S. senator before election
Alva B. Adams
Democratic
Elected U.S. Senator
Rice W. Means
Republican

The 1924 United States Senate special election in Colorado took place on November 4, 1924, to fill the remainder of the term for which Samuel D. Nicholson was elected in 1920. Nicholson died in office on March 24, 1923, and Democratic Governor William Ellery Sweet appointed Alva B. Adams, a prominent Pueblo attorney, to fill the vacancy. Adams, however, declined to be a candidate in the special election, instead challenging incumbent Republican Senator Lawrence C. Phipps in the regular election the same year.

In the Republican primary, Rice W. Means, the City Attorney of Denver, defeated attorney Charles W. Waterman and state prison official Charles T. Moynihan, reportedly aided in part by furtive help from the state's Ku Klux Klan organization. Meanwhile, attorney Morrison Shafroth, the son of John F. Shafroth, defeated former Congressman Benjamin Hilliard in the Democratic primary, advancing to the general election. Aided by President Calvin Coolidge's landslide victory in the state, Means, as well as most of the rest of the state Republican ticket, won handily.

== Democratic primary ==
=== Candidates ===
- Morrison Shafroth, attorney and son of former Governor and U.S. Senator John F. Shafroth
- Benjamin Hilliard, former U.S. Congressman

=== Results ===
Democratic primary results
| Party | Candidate | Votes | % |
|---|---|---|---|
| Democratic | Morrison Shafroth | 34,478 | 72.48 |
| Democratic | Benjamin Hilliard | 13,089 | 27.52 |
| Total votes | | 47,567 | 100.00 |

== Republican primary ==
=== Candidates ===
- Rice W. Means, former Adams County Judge, 1920 Republican candidate for the U.S. Senate
- Charles W. Waterman, attorney
- Charles T. Moynihan, Chairman of the State Board of Corrections

=== Results ===
Republican primary results
| Party | Candidate | Votes | % |
|---|---|---|---|
| Republican | Rice W. Means | 48,778 | 43.04 |
| Republican | Charles W. Waterman | 38,903 | 34.33 |
| Republican | Charles T. Moynihan | 25,655 | 22.64 |
| Total votes | | 113,336 | 100.00 |

== General election ==
=== Results ===
1924 United States Senate special election in Colorado
| Party | Candidate | Votes | % | ±% |
|---|---|---|---|---|
| Republican | Rice W. Means | 159,353 | 50.17% | −4.35% |
| Democratic | Morrison Shafroth | 138,714 | 43.67% | +4.37% |
| Farmer–Labor | Charles T. Philp | 17,542 | 5.52% | +2.37% |
| Socialist | Clyde Robinson | 2,012 | 0.63% | – |
| Majority | | 20,639 | 6.50% | −8.71% |
| Turnout | | 317,621 | | |
| Republican gain from Democratic | | | | |
