= Senator Schuyler =

Senator Schuyler may refer to:

- Karl C. Schuyler (1877–1933), U.S. Senator from Colorado from 1932 to 1933
- Philip Schuyler (1733–1804), U.S. Senator from New York from 1789 to 1791
