= 1924 United States Senate election in Colorado =

- November 4, 1924
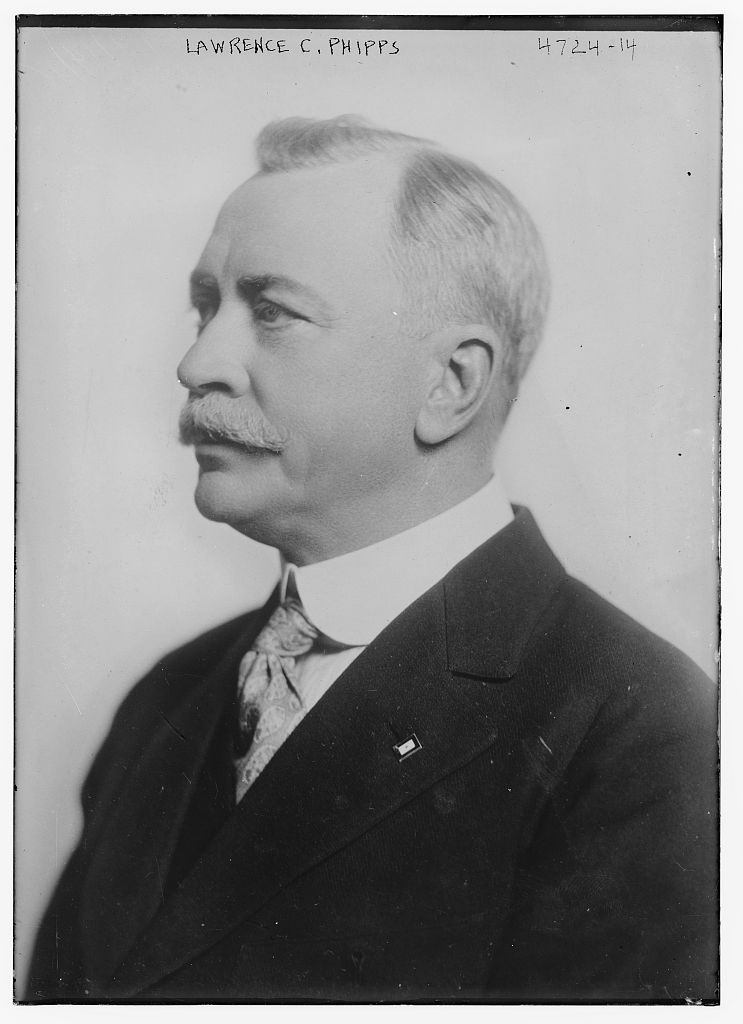

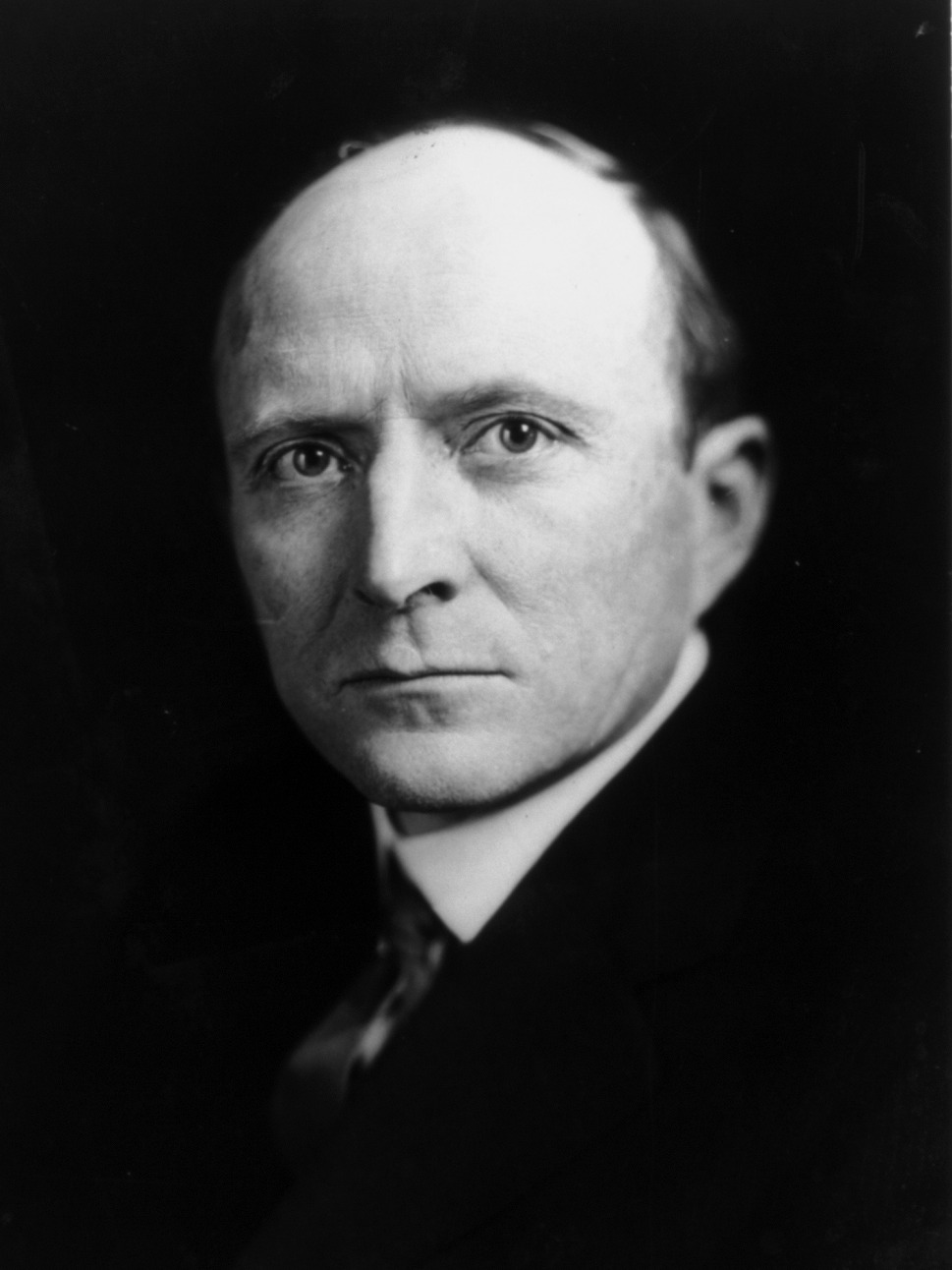

Nominee	Lawrence C. Phipps	Alva B. Adams	Morton Alexander
Party	Republican	Democratic	Farmer–Labor
Popular vote	159,698	139,660	16,039
Percentage	50.2%	43.9%	5.0%
- County results Phipps: 40–50% 50–60% 60–70% Adams: 40–50% 50–60% 60–70%
U.S. senator before election
Lawrence C. Phipps
Republican
Elected U.S. Senator
Lawrence C. Phipps
Republican

The 1924 United States Senate election in Colorado took place on November 4, 1924. Republican Senator Lawrence C. Phipps ran for re-election to a second term. Senator Alva B. Adams, who held the other Senate seat, opted not to run for re-election in the special election, and instead decided to challenge Phipps for re-election. Adams's gambit turned out to be unsuccessful, as he lost to Phipps by roughly the same margin as Democrats lost the special election.

== Democratic primary ==
=== Candidates ===
- Alva B. Adams, U.S. Senator

=== Campaign ===
Two separate elections for the U.S. Senate were held in 1924—the regularly scheduled election and a special election to fill the vacancy caused by Senator Samuel D. Nicholson's death in office. Alva B. Adams was appointed to fill Nicholson's seat, but rather than run for re-election, instead opted to challenge Phipps for re-election.

=== Results ===
Democratic primary results
Party	Candidate	Votes	%
Democratic	Alva B. Adams	44,891	100.00
Total votes		44,891	100.00

== Republican primary ==
=== Candidates ===
- Lawrence C. Phipps, incumbent U.S. Senator

=== Results ===
Republican primary results
Party	Candidate	Votes	%
Republican	Lawrence C. Phipps (inc.)	81,596	100.00
Total votes		81,596	100.00

== General election ==
=== Results ===
1924 United States Senate election in Colorado
Party	Candidate	Votes	%	±%
Republican	Lawrence C. Phipps (inc.)	159,698	50.19%	+0.70%
Democratic	Alva B. Adams	139,660	43.89%	−4.04%
Farmer–Labor	Morton Alexander	16,039	5.04%	–
Socialist	Elwood Hills	1,575	0.50%	–
Workers	James Albert Ayres	1,197	0.38%	–
Majority		20,038	6.30%	+4.75%
Turnout		318,169		
Republican hold				
