= 1920 United States Senate election in Colorado =

- November 2, 1920
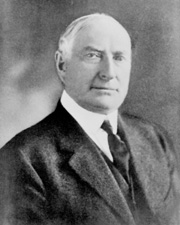

Nominee	Samuel D. Nicholson	Tully Scott
Party	Republican	Democratic
Popular vote	157,577	112,890
Percentage	54.52%	39.31%
- County results Nicholson: 40–50% 50–60% 60–70% 70–80% Scott: 40–50%
U.S. senator before election
Charles S. Thomas
Democratic
Elected U.S. Senator
Samuel D. Nicholson
Republican

The 1920 United States Senate election in Colorado took place on November 2, 1920. Incumbent Democratic Senator Charles S. Thomas initially declined to run for re-election, and State Supreme Court Justice Tully Scott won the Democratic nomination to succeed him, facing off against former Leadville Mayor Samuel D. Nicholson, the Republican nominee. However, in October 1920, Thomas announced that he would run for re-election as an independent due to his opposition to the League of Nations. However, Thomas's decision did not ultimately affect the outcome of the election. Aided by Republican presidential nominee Warren G. Harding's strong performance in the state, as well as Republican Governor Oliver Henry Shoup's landslide re-election, Nicholson defeated Tully and Thomas in a landslide. Out of four candidates, Thomas placed fourth, winning just 3% of the vote and finishing behind Farmer–Labor nominee G. F. Stevens.

Nicholson did not end up serving for the entire six-year term for which he was elected; he died in office on March 24, 1923, triggering a special election in 1924.

== Democratic primary ==
=== Candidates ===
- Tully Scott, Colorado Supreme Court Justice
- W. R. Callicotte, Chairman of the Colorado Farmers' Union
- William C. Danks, former Littleton City Councilman

=== Results ===
Democratic primary results
Party	Candidate	Votes	%
Democratic	Tully Scott	22,740	43.16
Democratic	W. R. Callicotte	22,660	43.01
Democratic	William C. Danks	7,283	13.82
Total votes		52,683	100.00

== Republican primary ==
=== Candidates ===
- Samuel D. Nicholson, former Mayor of Leadville, 1914 and 1916 Republican candidate for Governor
- Karl C. Schuyler, attorney
- Rice W. Means, former Adams County Judge

=== Results ===
Republican primary results
Party	Candidate	Votes	%
Republican	Samuel D. Nicholson	31,778	41.38
Republican	Karl C. Schuyler	31,372	40.85
Republican	Rice W. Means	13,650	17.77
Total votes		76,800	100.00

== General election ==
=== Results ===
1920 United States Senate election in Colorado
Party	Candidate	Votes	%	±%
Republican	Samuel D. Nicholson	156,577	54.52%	+15.52%
Democratic	Tully Scott	112,890	39.31%	−0.99%
Farmer–Labor	G. F. Stevens	9,041	3.15%	–
Independent	Charles S. Thomas (inc.)	8,665	3.02%	–
Write-ins		27	0.01%	–
Majority		43,687	15.21%	+13.90%
Turnout		287,200		
Republican gain from Democratic				
