= Orman-Adams House =

Historic house in Colorado, United States

- U.S. National Register of Historic Places
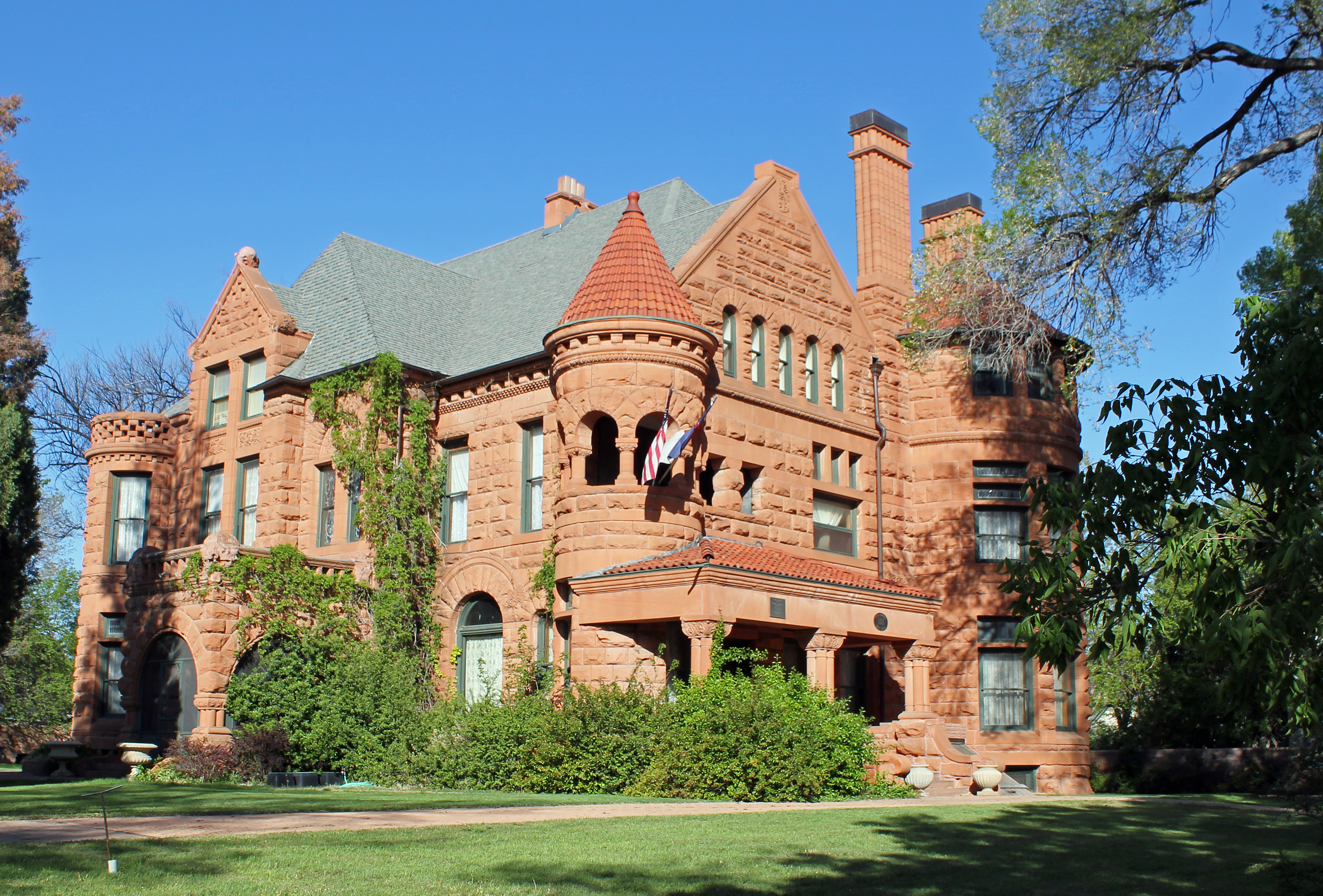

- Location within Colorado
- Location: 102 W. Orman Ave., Pueblo, Colorado
- Coordinates: 38.254722°N 104.6275°W
- Area: less than one acre
- Built: 1890
- Built by: Blackwell & Genest
- Architect: William A. Lang
- Architectural style: Richardsonian Romanesque
- NRHP reference No.: 76000567
- Added to NRHP: July 13, 1976

The Orman-Adams House, at 102 W. Orman Ave. in Pueblo, Colorado, was built in 1890. It was listed on the National Register of Historic Places in 1976.

It was designed by architect William A. Lang and built by contractors Blackwell & Genest.

It was deemed "an excellent example of Romanesque Revival" architecture, in particular of Richardsonian Romanesque. Its significance, however, derives not from its architecture but from its association with its residents, who included Colorado governors James B. Orman and Alva B. Adams. Orman was the original owner and had the house built in 1890; he lived there from 1891 to 1918. He served as governor of the state from 1901 to 1903. In 1918, Adams and family moved in. Adams served as governor during three periods: from 1887 to 1889, from 1897 to 1899, and for one day in March, 1905. He died in 1922. His son Alva B. Adams lived in the house from 1918 until his death in 1941, and served as U.S. Senator for the state from 1922 to 1924, and then again from 1932 to his death.

The house continued in use as a private residence until 1952, when it became an administrative office building of the local public school district. It was still serving in that capacity when it was listed in 1975. It has also been known as School Administration Building.

The home most recently changed ownership in 2022 when it was purchased by the Koncilja family.

The house is one of a number of large stately homes in the South Pueblo neighborhood.
