= Alva B. Adams =

American politician (1875–1941)

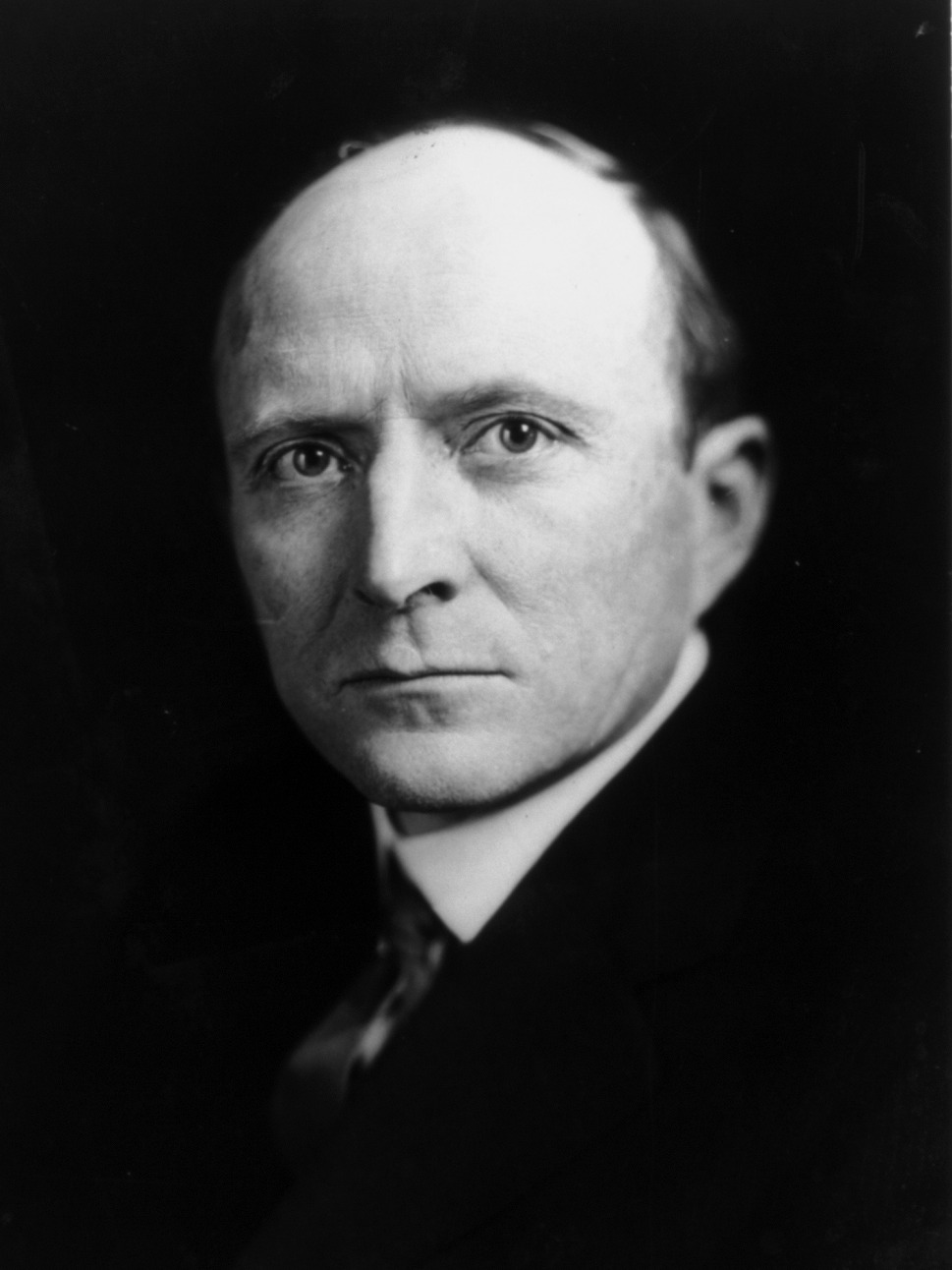

Chairman of the Senate Committee on Public Lands and Surveys
- In office January 3, 1937 – December 1, 1941
- Preceded by: Robert F. Wagner
- Succeeded by: Carl Hatch

United States Senator from Colorado
- In office March 4, 1933 – December 1, 1941
- Preceded by: Karl C. Schuyler
- Succeeded by: Eugene D. Millikin
- In office May 17, 1923 – November 30, 1924
- Appointed by: William Ellery Sweet
- Preceded by: Samuel D. Nicholson
- Succeeded by: Rice W. Means

Personal details
- Born: October 29, 1875 Del Norte, Colorado, U.S.
- Died: December 1, 1941 (aged 66) Washington, D.C., U.S.
- Resting place: Roselawn Cemetery, Pueblo, Colorado
- Party: Democratic
- Spouses: Clyda Yorke Moses (m. 1904; died 1905); Elizabeth Leo Matty (m. 1909–1941)
- Children: Ella (Uhl)^{(b. 1910; died 1942)}; Elizabeth (Booth)^{(b. 1913; died 1970)}; Alva Blanchard Adams Jr.^{(b. 1915; died 1981)}; William Herbert Adams II^{(b. 1919; died 1998)}
- Parents: Alva Adams (father); Ella Charlotte (Nye) Adams (mother)
- Relatives: John Adams (grandfather); Billy Adams (uncle)
- Education: Yale University; Columbia Law School
- Profession: Lawyer, politician

Military service
- Allegiance: United States
- Branch/service: United States Army; Judge Advocate General's Corps
- Years of service: 1918–1919
- Rank: Major
- Battles/wars: World War I

Alva Blanchard Adams Sr. (October 29, 1875 – December 1, 1941) was an American lawyer and Democratic politician from Pueblo, Colorado. He served nine years as a United States senator from Colorado, serving by appointment from 1923 to 1924, then serving again from 1933 until his death in 1941. He was the first U.S. senator from Colorado who was born in Colorado. He is the namesake of the Alva B. Adams Tunnel under Rocky Mountain National Park.

His father, Alva Adams, and uncle, Billy Adams, both served as governors of Colorado.

== Early life and education ==
Alva B. Adams was born October 29, 1875, in Del Norte, Colorado Territory. During his childhood, his father, Alva Adams, was elected the fifth governor of Colorado, and later was elected to two more non-consecutive terms. Alva B. Adams was raised and received his early education in Colorado, but for high school he was sent to the Phillips Academy in Massachusetts, where he graduated in 1893. He then attended Yale University, graduating in 1896, and went on to the Columbia Law School, where he earned his law degree in 1899.

== Early career ==
He returned to Colorado after completing his education and was admitted to the bar later that year, beginning a law practice in Pueblo, Colorado. Throughout his early adulthood, Alva Adams's father remained highly active in politics as a leader of the Colorado Democratic Party.

In 1909, Alva B. Adams became county attorney (Note: A county attorney in Colorado is not synonymous with "district attorney" as it is in some other states; a county attorney is legal counsel to the county government, as a city attorney is to a city) of Pueblo County, Colorado. In 1911, he was appointed a regent of the State University of Colorado and was elected city attorney of Pueblo.

== Political career ==
After the United States entered World War I, Adams was selected to serve on a special commission from Colorado to Washington, D.C., to advocate for Colorado's capacity to produce and warehouse war materiel. In 1918, Adams was commissioned as a major in the United States Army Judge Advocate General's Corps, where he served through the end of the war.

In 1920, Adams delivered the keynote address at the Democratic state convention, in which he gave a vigorous endorsement of President Woodrow Wilson and the League of Nations. At that convention, Adams was courted as a potential candidate for governor, but refused to run. In 1921, Adams was appointed to another special commission to Washington, D.C., this time seeking flood relief.

=== U.S. Senate ===
In March 1923, incumbent U.S. senator Samuel D. Nicholson died after a long illness. Adams was immediately mentioned as a potential successor, alongside U.S. representative Edward T. Taylor. Within 24 hours of Nicholson's death, news leaked that the governor, William Ellery Sweet, had already more-or-less made up his mind to appoint Adams, due in large part to the influence of Adams's uncle, Billy Adams, who by then was a powerful state senator. The leak of Adams's name, however, provoked a significant backlash from pro-prohibition elements in the state. After the backlash, Governor Sweet announced he would not make an appointment for several weeks; during that time several more names were floated for the position. Ultimately, Governor Sweet returned to his initial choice, and Adams was appointed United States senator on May 17, 1923. Adams's appointment made him the first U.S. Senator from Colorado to have been born in the state.

Adams's appointment to the Senate was only for the period until the next general election, in November 1924, when a special election would be held for the remaining two years of Nicholson's term. Adams, however, declined to run in the 1924 special election, opting to instead run in the regularly scheduled 1924 U.S. senate election for a full six-year term against Republican incumbent Lawrence C. Phipps. The Democrats ultimately lost both U.S. Senate elections; Adams received just 44% of the vote.

In 1932, upon the decision of Senator Charles W. Waterman not to seek re-election, Adams ran to succeed him, with Oscar L. Chapman managing his campaign, and narrowly won the Democratic primary over former state Attorney General John T. Barnett. Waterman died before his term expired, creating a vacancy, but Adams declined to be appointed to the seat and was not a candidate in the special election. Accordingly, state party chairman Walter Walker was appointed to the seat. In the election, Adams narrowly defeated Republican nominee Karl C. Schuyler, but Walker narrowly lost to Schuyler in the special election. Adams was re-elected in 1938 in a landslide. He died in office from a myocardial infarction, also known as a heart attack, in Washington, D.C. in 1941, just days before the Japanese attack on Pearl Harbor.

=== Committee assignments ===
Alva B. Adams was first appointed to the U.S. Senate to fill a vacancy during the first session of the 68th Congress. Even though he had been appointed in May 1923, Congress did not convene its first session until December of that year. A first edition of the Official Congressional Directory indicates he did not serve on any committees that session.

After Adams was elected in 1932 at the beginning of the 73rd Congress, he was appointed to several standing committees. Overall, he served on five standing committees and three select or special committees. Adams also served as chairman of the Committee on Irrigation and Reclamation during the 73rd and 74th Congresses and chaired the Committee on Public Lands and Surveys from the 75th through 77th Congresses.

| Committee | Congresses | Notes |
|---|---|---|
| Irrigation and Reclamation | 73rd – 75th | Chairman (73rd – 74th) |
| Public Lands and Surveys | 73rd – 77th | Chairman (75th – 77th) |
| Appropriations | 73rd – 75th | |
| Banking and Currency | 73rd – 75th | |
| Rules | 73rd – 75th | |
| Survey Land and Water Policies of the U.S. Government (Select) | 74th | |
| Senatorial Campaign Expenditures in 1940 (Select) | 76th | Appointed October 3, 1940, to fill a committee vacancy |
| Production, Transportation, and Marketing of Wool (Special) | 74th – 77th | Chairman |

== Personal life and family ==
Alva Blanchard Adams was the only son of Alva Adams and his wife Ella Charlotte (née Nye). Alva Adams was a Colorado pioneer, brought to the Colorado Territory with his siblings by his mother due to an outbreak of tuberculosis in southern Wisconsin, where his father, John Adams, was a state legislator. Alva decided to remain in Colorado when the rest of his family returned to Wisconsin; he grew to become a successful merchant in the new state and eventually won three terms as governor of Colorado. His brothers ultimately returned to Colorado as well; his younger brother, William Herbert "Billy" Adams, also served three terms as governor of Colorado.

Alva Blanchard Adams's middle name comes from his paternal grandmother, Eliza Blanchard. Eliza's younger brother, Alvin Blanchard, was the founder and namesake of Blanchardville, Wisconsin.

Alva Blanchard Adams married twice. His first wife was Clyda Yorke Moses; they were married in August 1904, but she died just a year later in July 1905, leaving no children. In 1909, Adams married Elizabeth Leo Matty; they had four children together and were married for 32 years before his death in 1941.

Alva Blanchard Adams suffered a serious heart attack in Washington, D.C., on November 25, 1941. He survived the initial attack, but he was ordered to remain in bed by his physicians. In the early morning of December 1, 1941, he suffered a subsequent heart attack at his D.C. residence at the Park Hotel, which proved fatal.

== Legacy ==
The Alva B. Adams Tunnel under Rocky Mountain National Park is named for him. The Alva B. Adams tunnel is the key component of the largest transmountain water diversion in the state of Colorado—the Colorado-Big Thompson Project (C-BT). The tunnel is 13.1 miles (21.1 km) long and has a concrete lined diameter of 9.75 feet (2.97 m). The tunnel runs in a straight line under the Continental Divide from west to east and passing under Rocky Mountain National Park.

The Orman-Adams House in Pueblo, where Alva B. Adams lived from 1918 until his death in 1941, is listed on the National Register of Historic Places.

== See also ==
- List of United States senators from Colorado
- List of members of the United States Congress who died in office (1900–1949)

== Notes ==
Party political offices
| Preceded by John F. Shafroth | Democratic nominee for U.S. Senator from Colorado (Class 2); 1924 | Succeeded by Edward P. Costigan |
| Preceded by Walter Walker | Democratic nominee for U.S. Senator from Colorado (Class 3); 1932, 1938 | Succeeded by James A. Marsh |
U.S. Senate
| Preceded by Samuel D. Nicholson | U.S. Senator (Class 3) from Colorado; May 17, 1923 – November 30, 1924 | Succeeded by Rice W. Means |
| Preceded by Karl C. Schuyler | U.S. Senator (Class 3) from Colorado; March 4, 1933 – December 1, 1941 (died) | Succeeded by Eugene D. Millikin |
| Preceded by Robert F. Wagner | Chairman of the Senate Committee on Public Lands and Surveys; January 3, 1937 – December 1, 1941 (died) | Succeeded by Carl Hatch |
