= Lawrence C. Phipps =

American politician (1862–1958)

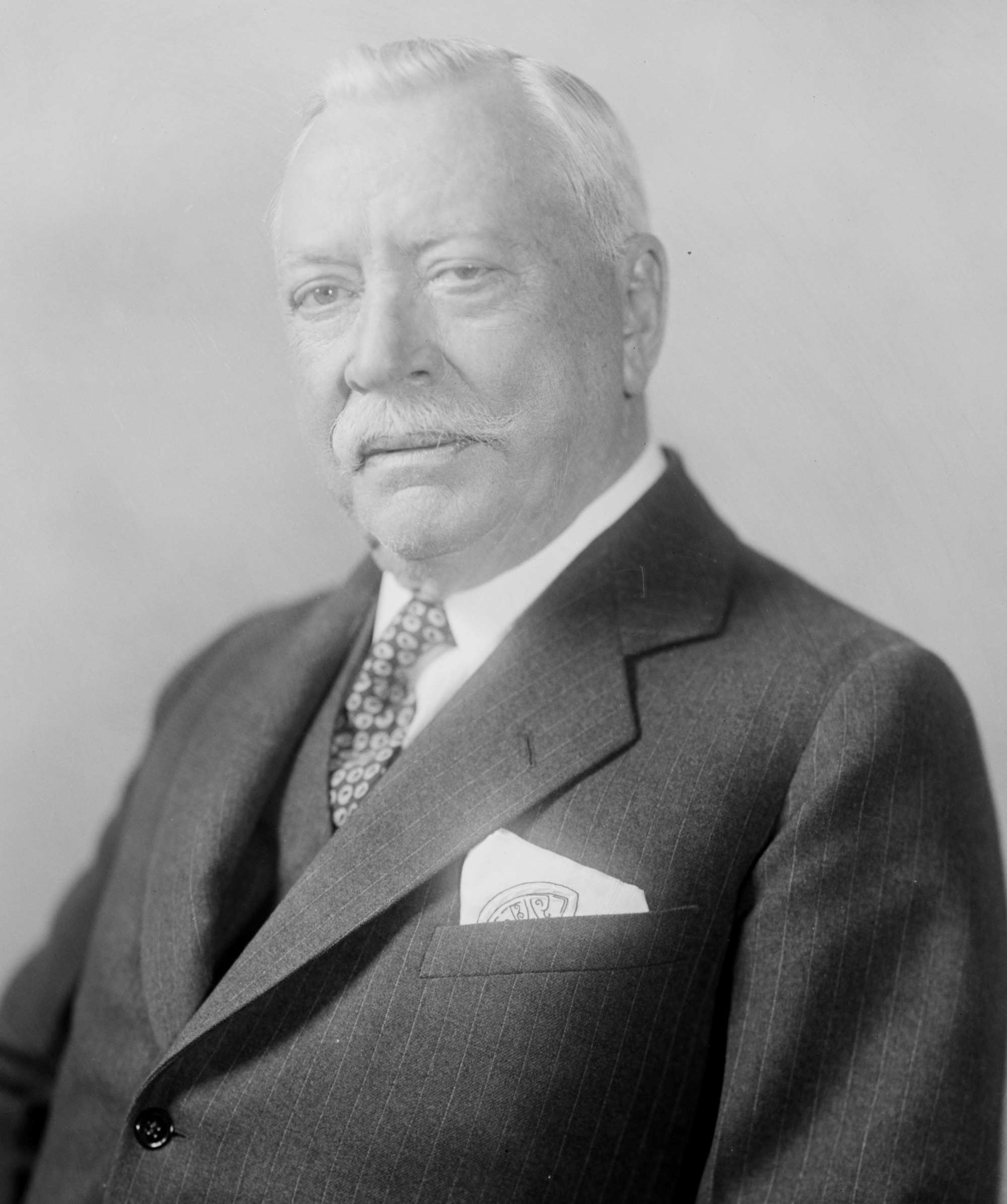

United States Senator from Colorado
- In office March 4, 1919 – March 3, 1931
- Preceded by: John Franklin Shafroth
- Succeeded by: Edward Prentiss Costigan

Personal details
- Born: Lawrence Cowle Phipps; August 30, 1862 Amity, Pennsylvania, US
- Died: March 1, 1958 (aged 95) Santa Monica, California, US
- Resting place: Fairmount Mausoleum
- Party: Republican
- Spouses: Ibrealla Hill Loomis (m. 1885; died 1888) Genevieve Chandler (m. 1897; div. 1904) Margaret Rogers (m. 1911)
- Parents: William Henry Phipps; Agnes McCall
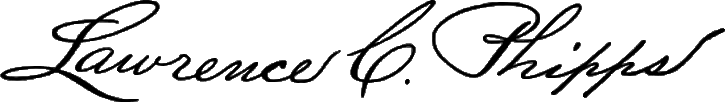
- Signature

Lawrence Cowle Phipps (August 30, 1862 – March 1, 1958) was an American businessman and politician who served two terms as a United States senator representing Colorado from 1919 until 1931.

== Biography ==
Lawrence Cowle Phipps was born on August 30, 1862, in Amity, Pennsylvania, the son of William Henry Phipps and Agnes McCall. He grew up in Pittsburgh, Pennsylvania, where he joined the Carnegie Steel Company as a clerk. His uncle, Henry Phipps, was the second-largest shareholder in the company. Lawrence Phipps eventually advanced to first vice president. He retired in 1901, and moved to Denver, Colorado, where he was active in investments, and was president of the Colorado Taxpayers Protective League in 1917.

=== U.S. Senate ===
In 1918, Phipps was elected to the United States Senate as a member of the Republican Party, defeating the Democratic incumbent, John Franklin Shafroth. Phipps was reelected in 1924 on the memorable slogan, "A vote for Lawrence C. Phipps is another vote for Coolidge." He did not run again in 1930.

== Personal life ==
Phipps married Ibrealla Hill Loomis in 1885, and they had two children. She died in July 1888. On April 22, 1897, he remarried to Genevieve Chandler, and they had two children. He was granted a divorce from her on September 14, 1904, on the grounds of desertion.

In 1911, he remarried to Margaret Rogers, and they had two children. Between 1931 and 1933, they built the Phipps Estate, in part to provide jobs during the Great Depression. Mrs. Phipps donated the mansion and grounds to the University of Denver in 1964. Two of his sons in Gerald and Allen went on to purchase and operate the Denver Broncos.

=== Death and burial ===
Phipps died on March 1, 1958, in Santa Monica, California. He was entombed in the Fairmount Mausoleum at Fairmount Cemetery in Denver.

== Legacy ==
Phipps is the namesake of Phippsburg, Colorado.

Party political offices
Preceded by Clyde Dawson	Republican nominee for U.S. Senator from Colorado (Class 2); 1918, 1924	Succeeded by George H. Shaw
U.S. Senate
Preceded by John Shafroth	U.S. senator (Class 2) from Colorado; March 4, 1919 – March 3, 1931; Served alongside: Charles S. Thomas, Samuel D. Nicholson, Alva B. Adams, Rice W. Means, Charles W. Waterman	Succeeded by Edward Costigan
Honorary titles
Preceded by Joseph Ransdell	Oldest living U.S. senator July 27, 1954 – March 1, 1958	Succeeded by Joseph Grundy
