= 1932 United States Senate elections in Colorado =

- November 8, 1932
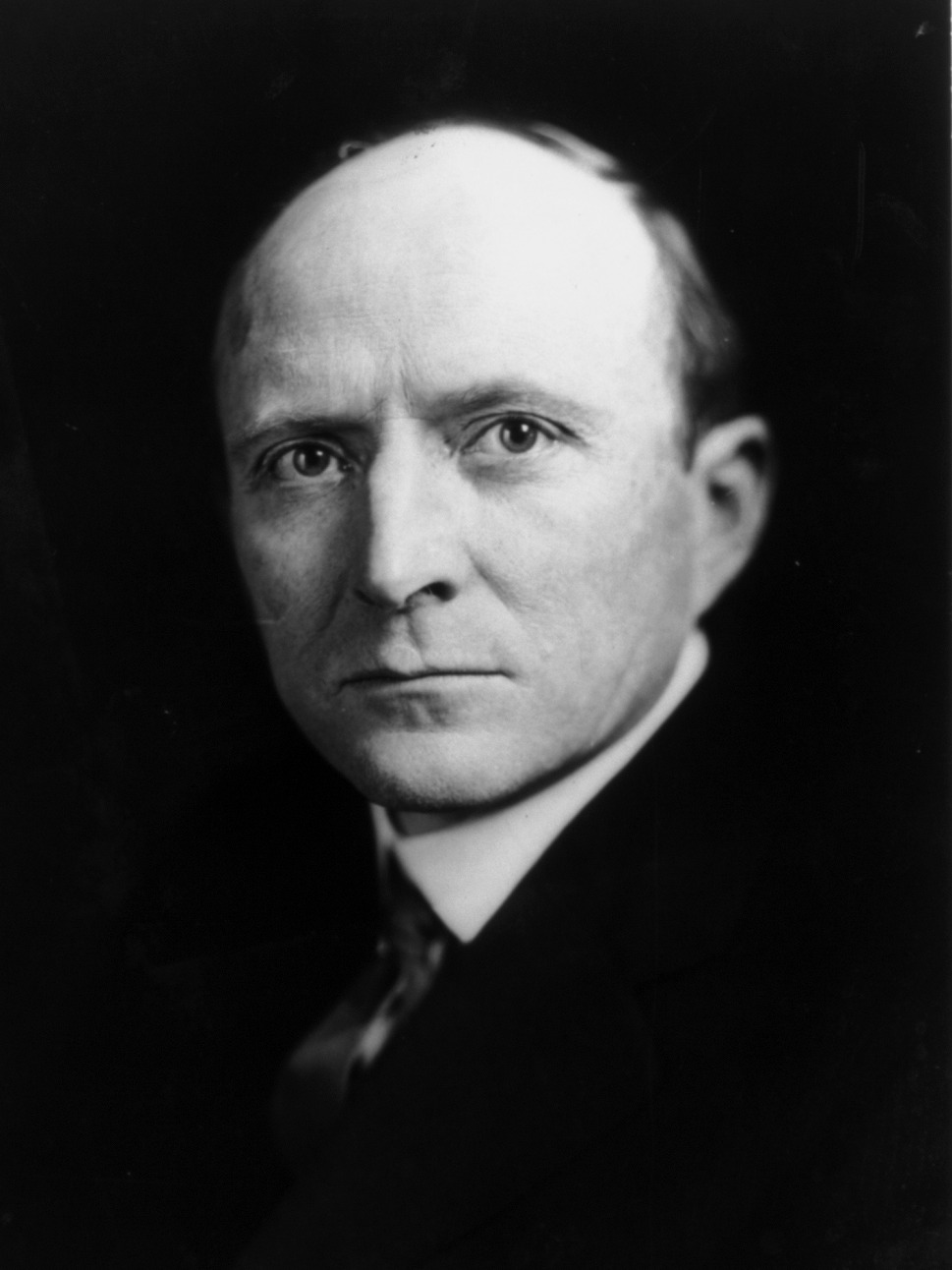

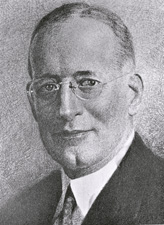
Nominee	Alva B. Adams	Karl C. Schuyler
Party	Democratic	Republican
Popular vote	226,516	198,519
Percentage	51.91%	45.50%
- County results Adams: 40–50% 50–60% 60–70% Schuyler: 40–50% 50–60%
U.S. senator before election
Walter Walker
Democratic
Elected U.S. Senator
Alva B. Adams
Democratic

The 1932 United States Senate elections in Colorado took place on November 8, 1932. Incumbent Republican Senator Charles W. Waterman announced that he would not seek re-election to a second term. Attorney Karl C. Schuyler won the Republican nomination to succeed Waterman and faced former Senator Alva B. Adams, the Democratic nominee, in the general election.

However, shortly before the primary elections took place, Waterman died in office. Governor Billy Adams appointed Walter Walker, the Chairman of the Colorado Democratic Party, to fill the vacancy. A special election was called for the November 8, 1932, general election to fill the remaining months of Waterman's term. The state Republican Party named Schuyler as its nominee, but Adams declined to be a candidate in the special election, and Walker was named as the nominee.

The ensuing elections produced a split result. Schuyler narrowly won the special election over Walker by about 1,000 votes, and ended up serving for several months in the Senate. However, Adams handily defeated Schuyler for the full term.

== Democratic primary ==
=== Regular election ===
==== Candidates ====
- Alva B. Adams, former U.S. Senator
- John T. Barnett, former Attorney General of Colorado

=== Results ===
Democratic primary results
Party	Candidate	Votes	%
Democratic	Alva B. Adams	65,701	52.71
Democratic	John T. Barnett	58,938	47.29
Total votes		124,639	100.00

=== Special election ===
Adams declined to be a candidate in the special election, and the state Democratic Party named Senator Walter Walker as its nominee.

== Republican primary ==
=== Regular election ===
==== Candidates ====
- Karl C. Schuyler, attorney
- Nate C. Warren, State Senator from Larimer County

===== Dropped out =====
- John Foster Symes, Judge of the United States District Court for the District of Colorado

==== Campaign ====
Senator Waterman's announcement that he would not seek re-election triggered an open Republican contest for the nomination to replace him. Nate C. Warren emerged as a leading Republican candidate, and federal judge John Foster Symes, upon the urging of the state Republican establishment, also entered the race with the party's support. However, at the Republican convention, Denver-area Republicans encouraged Symes to drop out of the race in favor of attorney and party leader Karl C. Schuyler in an effort to defeat Warren. Both Schuyler and Warren won places on the September primary ballot, and Schuyler narrowly defeated Warren.

==== Results ====
Republican primary
Party	Candidate	Votes	%
Republican	Karl C. Schuyler	66,179	58.43%
Republican	Nate C. Warren	47,080	41.57%
Total votes		113,259	100.00%

=== Special election ===
The state Republican Party held off on naming its nominee for the special election until the primary for the regular election was settled. At that point, Schuyler was named as the nominee for the special election.

== General election ==
=== Results ===
==== Regular election ====
1932 United States Senate election in Colorado
Party	Candidate	Votes	%	±%
Democratic	Alva B. Adams	226,516	51.91%	+5.52%
Republican	Karl C. Schuyler	198,519	45.50%	−4.75%
Socialist	Carle Whitehead	8,632	1.98%	+1.23%
Farmer–Labor	H. H. Marrs	1,814	0.42%	−1.54%
Communist	Raymond D. D. Richardson	858	0.20%	−0.09%
Majority		27,997	6.42%	+2.56%
Turnout		436,339		
Democratic hold				

==== Special election ====
1932 United States Senate special election in Colorado
Party	Candidate	Votes	%	±%
Republican	Karl C. Schuyler	207,540	48.76%	−1.49%
Democratic	Walter Walker	206,475	48.51%	+2.12%
Socialist	Carle Whitehead	11,619	2.73%	+1.98%
Majority		1,065	0.25%	−3.60%
Turnout		425,634		
Republican gain from Democratic				
