= 1938 United States Senate election in Colorado =

- November 8, 1938
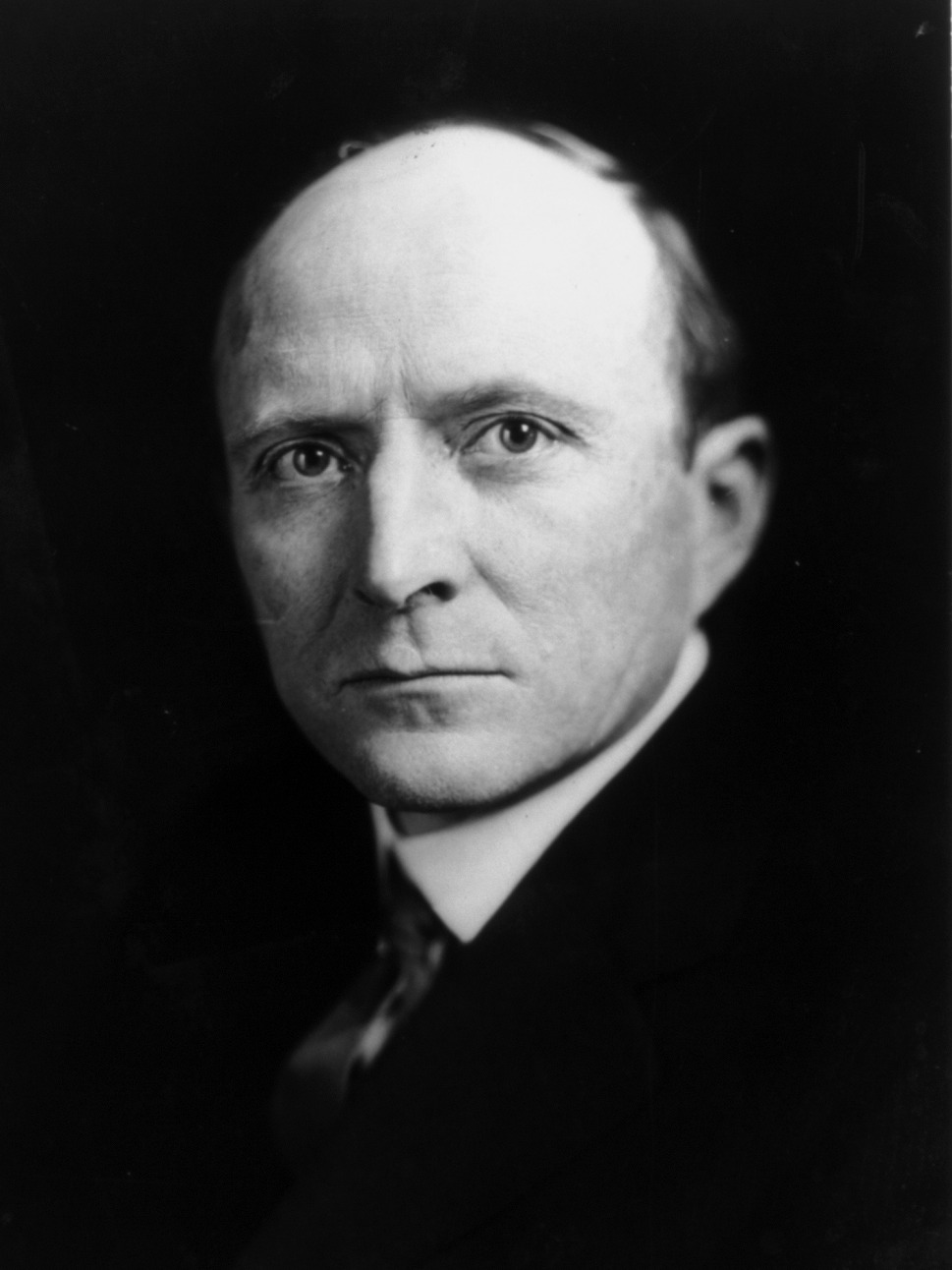

| Nominee | Alva B. Adams | Archibald A. Lee |
| Party | Democratic | Republican |
| Popular vote | 262,806 | 181,297 |
| Percentage | 58.24% | 40.18% |
- Results by county Adams: 50–60% 60–70% 70–80% Lee: 40–50% 50–60%
U.S. senator before election
Alva B. Adams
Democratic
Elected U.S. Senator
Alva B. Adams
Democratic

The 1938 United States Senate election in Colorado took place on November 8, 1938. Incumbent Democratic Senator Alva B. Adams ran for re-election to a second term. Adams faced Denver attorney Archibald A. Lee, the Republican nominee, in the general election. Despite the nationwide Republican landslide, including Republicans' landslide victory in the gubernatorial election that year, Adams's popularity translated into an easy re-election campaign. Adams ended up defeating Lee with 58% of the vote. However, Adams did not end up fully serving his second term; he died on December 1, 1941.

== Democratic primary ==
=== Candidates ===
- Alva B. Adams, incumbent U.S. Senator
- Benjamin Hilliard, Colorado Supreme Court Justice, former U.S. Congressman

=== Campaign ===
Early speculation swirled that State Supreme Court Justice Benjamin Hilliard would challenge Senator Alva B. Adams in the Democratic primary over Adams's tepid support for the New Deal. Hilliard allowed his name to be placed into nomination at the state Democratic convention, but he failed to receive enough votes to be placed on the primary ballot. As a result, Adams was nominated unopposed in the primary.

=== Results ===
Democratic primary results
| Party | Candidate | Votes | % |
|---|---|---|---|
| Democratic | Alva B. Adams (inc.) | 92,006 | 100.00 |
| Total votes | | 92,006 | 100.00 |

== Republican primary ==
=== Candidates ===
- Archibald A. Lee, Denver attorney

=== Campaign ===
Despite the nationwide trend in favor of Republicans, few were interested in challenging Senator Adams for re-election. In the leadup to the Republican convention, attorneys Archibald A. Lee and John R. Coen were discussed as possibilities, but in the end, only Lee opted to run. He was nominated at the convention unopposed and was uncontested in the primary election.

=== Results ===
Republican primary results
| Party | Candidate | Votes | % |
|---|---|---|---|
| Republican | Archibald A. Lee | 57,410 | 100.00 |
| Total votes | | 57,410 | 100.00 |

== General election ==
=== Results ===
1938 United States Senate election in Colorado
| Party | Candidate | Votes | % | ±% |
|---|---|---|---|---|
| Democratic | Alva B. Adams (inc.) | 262,806 | 58.24% | +6.33% |
| Republican | Archibald A. Lee | 181,297 | 40.18% | −5.32% |
| Socialist | Carle Whitehead | 3,604 | 0.80% | −1.18% |
| Independent Progressive | James Allander | 3,522 | 0.78% | — |
| Majority | | 81,509 | 18.06% | +11.65% |
| Turnout | | 451,229 | | |
| Democratic hold | | | | |
