= 1966 United States Senate election in Colorado =

- November 8, 1966
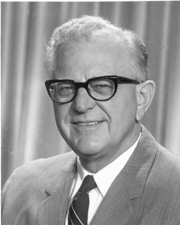

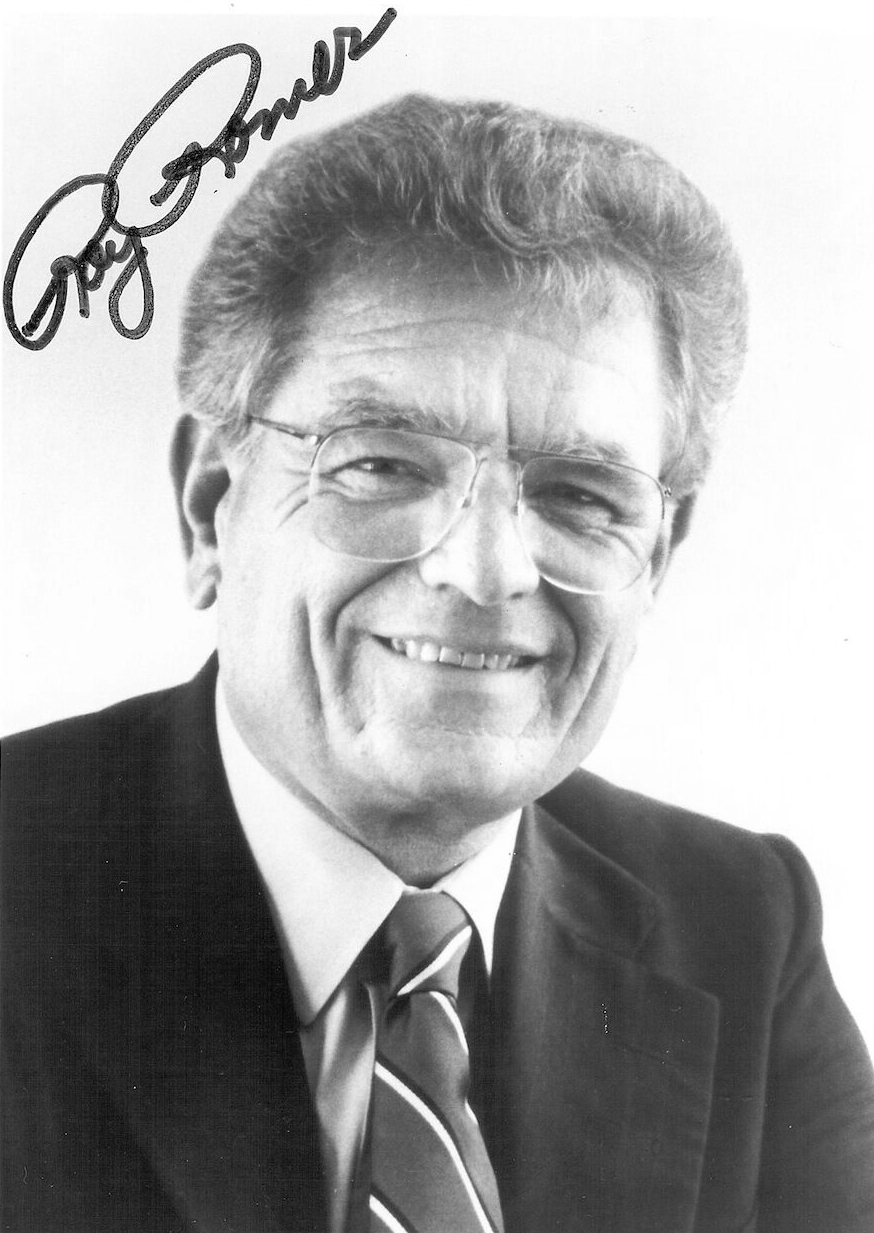
Nominee	Gordon Allott	Roy Romer
Party	Republican	Democratic
Popular vote	368,307	266,198
Percentage	58.02%	41.93%
- County results Allott: 50–60% 60–70% 70–80% Romer: 50–60% 60–70%
U.S. senator before election
Gordon Allott
Republican
Elected U.S. senator
Gordon Allott
Republican

The 1966 United States Senate election in Colorado took place on November 8, 1966. Incumbent Republican Senator Gordon Allott was re-elected to a third term in office, defeating Democratic State Senator Roy Romer.

Romer would later be elected three terms as Treasurer of Colorado and another three terms as governor.

== General election ==
=== Results ===
General election results
Party	Candidate	Votes	%	±%
Republican	Gordon Allott (Incumbent)	368,307	58.02%	▲4.50
Democratic	Roy Romer	266,198	41.93%	▼4.09
Independent	Walter Cranson (write-in)	332	0.05%	N/A
Total votes		634,837	100.00%	

== See also ==
- 1966 United States Senate elections
