= 1960 United States Senate election in Colorado =

- November 8, 1960
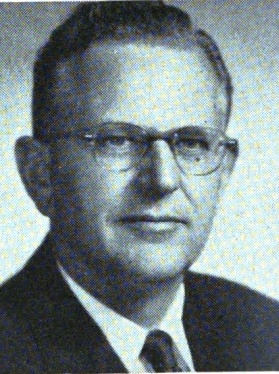

Nominee	Gordon Allott	Robert Lee Knous
Party	Republican	Democratic
Popular vote	389,428	334,854
Percentage	53.52%	46.02%
- County results Allott: 40–50% 50–60% 60–70% Knous: 50–60% 60–70%
U.S. senator before election
Gordon Allott
Republican
Elected U.S. Senator
Gordon Allott
Republican

The 1960 United States Senate election in Colorado took place on November 8, 1960. Incumbent Republican Senator Gordon Allott was re-elected to a second term in office, defeating Democratic Lieutenant Governor Robert Lee Knous.

== General election ==
=== Results ===
General election results
Party	Candidate	Votes	%	±%
Republican	Gordon Allott (inc.)	389,428	53.52%	▲2.20
Democratic	Robert Lee Knous	334,854	46.02%	▼2.66
Independent	William R. Casey	3,351	0.46%	N/A
Total votes		634,837	100.00%	

== See also ==
- 1960 United States Senate elections
