= Charles W. Waterman =

American politician (1861–1932)

Charles Winfield Waterman
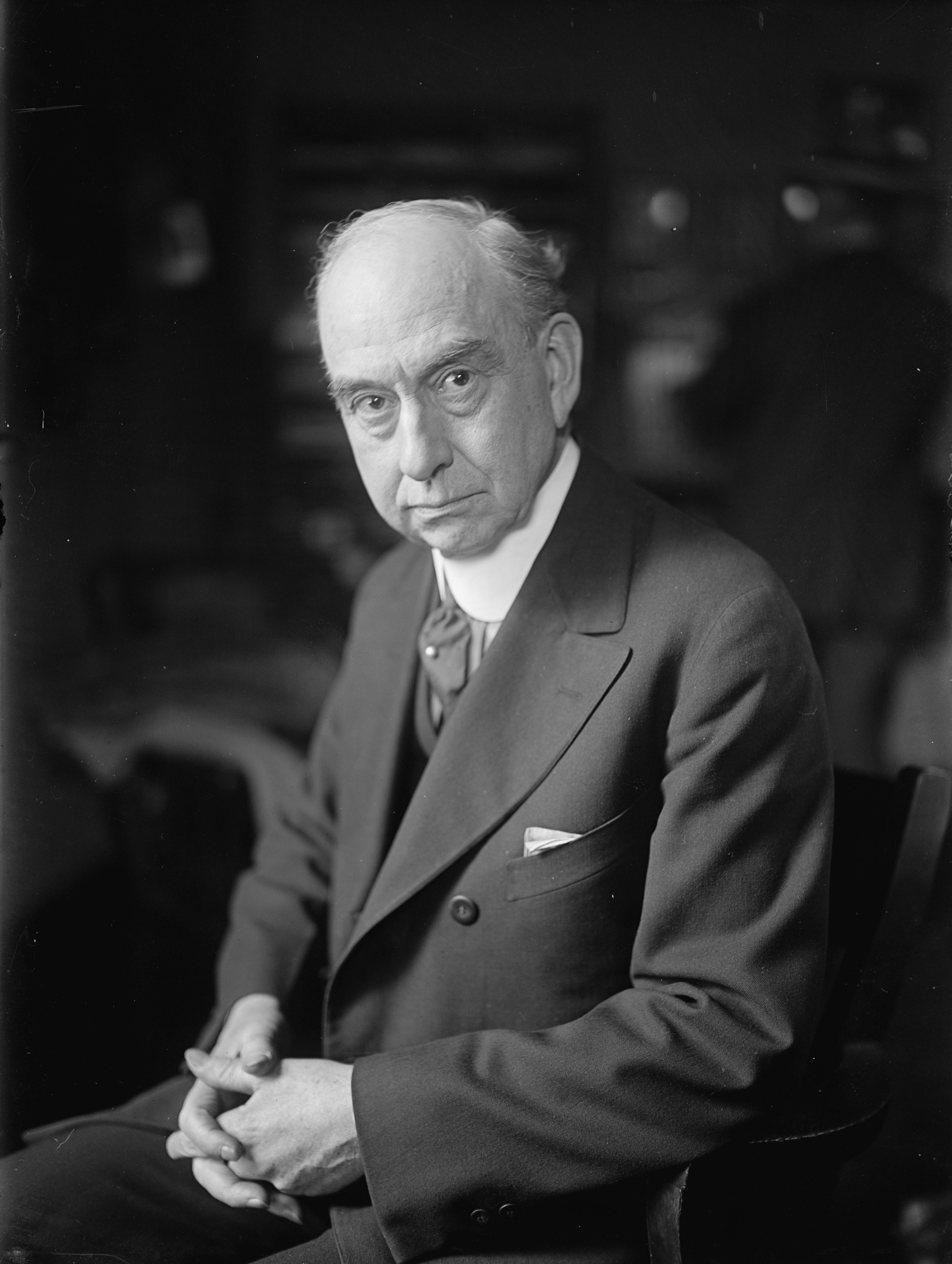

United States Senator from Colorado
- In office March 4, 1927 – August 27, 1932
- Preceded by: Rice W. Means
- Succeeded by: Walter Walker

Counsel to the U.S. Oil Conservation Board
- In office December 19, 1924 – February 25, 1927
- Preceded by: Position established
- Succeeded by: None (position vacant)

Personal details
- Born: November 2, 1861 Waitsfield, Vermont, US
- Died: August 27, 1932 (aged 70) Washington, D.C., US
- Resting place: Cedar Hill Cemetery, Suitland, Maryland, US
- Party: Republican
- Spouse: Anna R. Cook (m. 1890)
- Education: University of Vermont; University of Michigan Law School
- Profession: Attorney

Charles Winfield Waterman (November 2, 1861 – August 27, 1932) was a Colorado attorney and politician. He is most notable for his service as a United States senator from 1927 to 1932.

Born in Waitsfield, Vermont, Waterman graduated from the University of Vermont in 1885 and taught school before attending the University of Michigan Law School. Following his 1889 graduation, Waterman moved to Denver, where he became a successful corporate and railroad attorney and was active in politics as a Republican. After serving as a delegate to the 1916 Republican National Convention and running unsuccessfully for the Republican U.S. Senate nomination in 1918, Waterman was the Colorado manager for Calvin Coolidge's 1924 presidential campaign. After Coolidge won, he appointed Waterman general counsel for the Federal Oil Conservation Board. He was a delegate to the 1924 Republican National Convention, and later that year ran unsuccessfully for the U.S. Senate in a special election, losing the Republican nomination for a two-year term to Rice W. Means, who went on to win the general election.

In 1926, Waterman defeated Means for the Republican nomination for a full six-year term. He defeated Democrat William Ellery Sweet in the general election, and served from 1927 until his death. Waterman became ill in 1932, and announced that he would not be a candidate for re-election that year. His health continued to worsen, and he died in Washington, D.C., on August 27. He was buried at Cedar Hill Cemetery in Suitland, Maryland.

Waterman was also a noted philanthropist; in addition to creating a charitable fund for Colorado attorneys, he donated a substantial amount to the University of Vermont, including funds for the construction of a campus building named for Waterman and his wife.

== Early life ==
Waterman was born in Waitsfield, Washington County, Vermont, on November 2, 1861, the son of John Waterman and Mary (Leach) Waterman. He worked on his family's farm, attended the Waitsfield public schools, and graduated from St. Johnsbury Academy. He graduated from the University of Vermont in Burlington in 1885, and was a school teacher and principal in Mooers, New York, Groton, Connecticut, and Fort Dodge, Iowa, from 1885 to 1888.

== Legal career ==
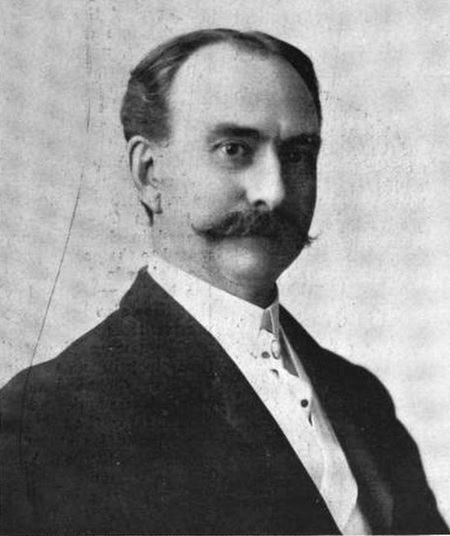
Charles W. Waterman, Denver attorney (1911).

Waterman graduated from the University of Michigan Law School in 1889, was admitted to the bar, and commenced practice in the Denver office of Republican politician John F. Shafroth. He later practiced as the partner of Edward O. Wolcott, and then as the principal of his own firm. Waterman was a successful corporation lawyer, and his clients included the Great Western Sugar Company, Great Western Railway of Colorado, Chicago, Burlington and Quincy Railroad, Denver and Rio Grande Western Railroad, and New York Life Insurance Company.

== Political career ==
He was also active in Republican politics, and was a delegate to the 1916 Republican National Convention. In 1918, he was an unsuccessful candidate for the Republican nomination for U.S. Senator; he lost to Lawrence C. Phipps, who went on to defeat John F. Shafroth (now a Democrat) in the general election.

Waterman was a member of the University of Vermont board of trustees from 1921 to 1925; in 1922, he received the honorary degree of LL.D. from UVM.

In 1923 and 1924, Waterman was active in the effort to elect Calvin Coolidge to a full term as president, and managed his campaign in Colorado; In December 1924, Coolidge rewarded Waterman with appointment as general counsel for the newly created federal Oil Conservation Board, a panel made up of the Secretaries of War, Navy, Interior, and Commerce. In addition, he was a delegate to the 1924 Republican National Convention.

In 1924, Waterman was an unsuccessful candidate for the Republican nomination for the U.S. Senate seat left vacant by the death of Samuel D. Nicholson. He lost to Rice W. Means, a candidate supported by the Ku Klux Klan; Means went on to win the general election for the remainder of Nicholson's term, defeating John Shafroth's son Morrison Shafroth.

Waterman ran again in 1926, and defeated Means for the Republican nomination. He then defeated former Governor William Ellery Sweet, the Democratic nominee, in the general election. He served in the Senate from March 4, 1927, until his death. During his Senate term, Waterman was chairman of the Committee on Patents and the Committee on Enrolled Bills (72nd Congress). According to one source, Waterman's Senate record made him the most conservative member ever of either the U.S. House or U.S. Senate.

== Philanthropy ==
Bequests from the estate of Charles Waterman and his wife included the creation of a charitable trust to benefit Colorado attorneys who face financial burdens because of age or illness. In addition, the Watermans donated funds to the University of Vermont for the design and construction of the Charles Winfield Waterman and Anna R. Waterman Memorial Building. The Waterman building has been used for several purposes since it opened in 1941, and in recent years has been the location of admissions and other administrative offices.

== Death and burial ==
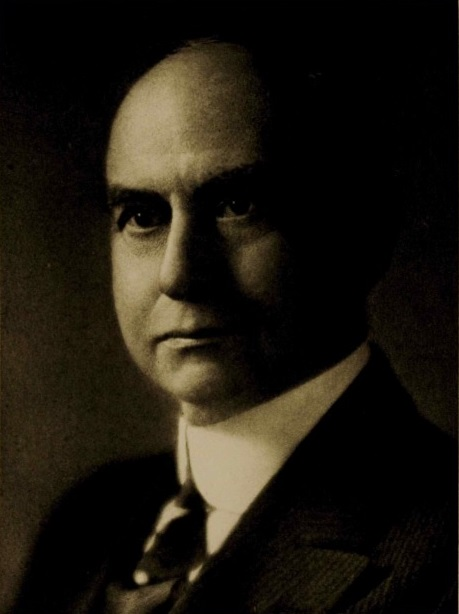
Frontispiece of 1933's Charles W. Waterman, Late a Senator from Colorado.

Waterman became ill in 1932 and announced that he would not be a candidate for reelection. He died at the Wardman Park Hotel in Washington, D.C., on August 27, 1932. His remains were cremated and interred at Cedar Hill Cemetery in Suitland, Maryland.

== Family ==
On June 18, 1890, Waterman married Anna Rankin Cook (1865–1939) of Burlington, Vermont.

== See also ==
- List of members of the United States Congress who died in office (1900–1949)

== Sources ==
=== Books ===
- Official Report of the Proceedings of the Sixteenth Republican National Convention. New York, NY: Tenny Press. 1916. p. 42.
- One Thousand American Men of Mark of To-day. Chicago, IL: American Men of Mark. 1916. pp. 306–307.
- Sketches of Colorado. Vol. 1. Denver, CO: Western Press Bureau Company. 1911. p. 167.
- The National Cyclopaedia of American Biography. Vol. 3. New York, NY: J.T. White & Company. 1930. p. 418.
- Who's Who in the Rockies. Denver, CO: Denver Press Club. 1923. p. Entry for Charles W. Waterman.
- Spencer, Thomas E. (1998). Where They're Buried. Baltimore, MD: Clearfield Company. ISBN 978-0-8063-4823-0 – via Google Books.

=== Newspapers ===
- "Primaries Held in Colorado and Arizona". Twin City Daily Sentinel. Winston-Salem, NC. September 10, 1918. p. 1 – via Newspapers.com.
- "L. C. Phipps Named Senate Candidate". Pittsburgh Post. Pittsburgh, PA. September 13, 1918. p. 2 – via Newspapers.com.
- "Republicans Clean Up Everything In Colorado". Bridgeport Telegram. Bridgeport, CT. November 9, 1918. p. 23 – via Newspapers.com.
- "Manager for Coolidge Named: Charles W. Waterman, Attorney, Selected". Des Moines Register. Des Moines, IA. Associated Press. December 23, 1923. p. 12 – via Newspapers.com.
- "Coolidge Manager Candidate for Senator". Daily Pioneer. Deadwood, SD. July 13, 1924. p. 1 – via Newspapers.com.
- "Criticizes Coolidge for Keeping Sugar Prices Up". Harrisburg Evening News. Harrisburg, PA. September 8, 1924. p. 7 – via Newspapers.com.
- "Ku Klux Candidates Lead in Colorado". Daily Times. Wilson, NC. September 23, 1924. p. 4 – via Newspapers.com.
- "Colorado for Coolidge". Indianapolis News. Indianapolis, IN. November 5, 1924. p. 23 – via Newspapers.com.
- "Oil Conservation Board Names Waterman Counsel". Oil, Paint and Drug Reporter. New York, NY: Schnell Publishing Company. 1925. p. 41.
- "Klan Candidate Trails Along in Colorado Voting". El Paso Herald. El Paso, TX. Associated Press. September 15, 1926. p. 1 – via Newspapers.com.
- "Gov Hunt Has 22-Vote Lead". Ogden Standard-Examiner. Ogden, UT. Associated Press. November 4, 1926. p. 7 – via Newspapers.com.
- Turner, Chuck; Strauss, Richard (May 23, 2016). "A Seat at the Bar: The Vermont – Colorado – Washington – Colorado Connection: The DBA's Waterman Legacy Continues to Exert a Profound Impact on Colorado Lawyers". The Docket. Denver, CO: Denver Bar Association.
- "Senator Waterman, Coolidge Aide, Dies". Asbury Park Press. Asbury Park, NJ. Associated Press. August 27, 1932. p. 3 – via Newspapers.com.
- "Sen. Waterman Dead". Burlington Free Press. Burlington, VT. August 29, 1932. p. 2 – via Newspapers.com.

=== Internet ===
- "Waterman Memorial Building, 85 South Prospect Street". University Green Area Heritage Study, Historic Burlington Research Project - HP 206. Burlington, VT: Historic Preservation Program - University of Vermont.
- Rosenthal, Howard L.; Poole, Keith T. (1992-10-31). "Reformatted Data". United States Congressional Roll Call Voting Records, 1789-1990. doi:10.3886/icpsr09822.
- United States Congress. "Charles W. Waterman (id: W000186)". Biographical Directory of the United States Congress.

Party political offices
Preceded by Rice W. Means	Republican nominee for U.S. Senator from Colorado (Class 3); 1926	Succeeded by Karl C. Schuyler
U.S. Senate
Preceded by Rice W. Means	U.S. Senator (Class 3) from Colorado; 1927–1932	Succeeded by Walter Walker
