= Walter Walker (politician) =

American newspaper publisher and politician

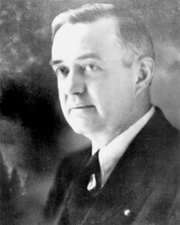

United States Senator from Colorado
- In office September 26, 1932 – December 6, 1932
- Appointed by: Billy Adams
- Preceded by: Charles W. Waterman
- Succeeded by: Karl C. Schuyler

Chairman of the Colorado Democratic State Committee
- In office September 18, 1930 – September 22, 1932
- Preceded by: Thomas Annear
- Succeeded by: James A. Marsh

Personal details
- Born: April 3, 1883 Marion, Kentucky
- Died: October 8, 1956 (aged 73) Grand Junction, Colorado
- Resting place: Orchard Mesa Cemetery, Grand Junction, Colorado
- Party: Democratic
- Spouse: Kathie Wood (m. 1903–1956, his death)
- Children: 1
- Profession: Newspaper owner and editor

Walter Walker (April 3, 1883 – October 8, 1956) was a newspaper owner and editor in Colorado who briefly served as Democratic United States senator in late 1932 after being appointed to fill a vacancy pending a special election.

A native of Marion, Kentucky, Walker was educated in the schools of Marion and moved to Colorado as a young man. He became a resident of Grand Junction, where he began a career in the newspaper business. He became an editor of the Grand Junction Daily Sentinel, and eventually became the paper's owner.

When the Ku Klux Klan was revived in the 1920s, Walker became a member. He later came out in opposition to the Klan, which led to members of the group attacking him in the street, but Walker refused to end his anti-Klan activities. Active in the Democratic Party, he was a delegate to the Democratic National Convention in 1924, 1928, and 1932. From 1930 to 1932, he served as chairman of Colorado's Democratic state committee.

In September 1932, Colorado's governor appointed Walker to fill a vacancy in the United States Senate. He ran in the special election to complete the term, but was defeated by Republican nominee Karl C. Schuyler, who was sworn in to office in December. He continued to own and publish the Daily Sentinel and was a delegate to the Democratic National Conventions in 1936, 1940, 1944, 1948, and 1952. In 1936, he was a presidential elector for the ticket of Franklin D. Roosevelt and John Nance Garner.

Walker died in Grand Junction on October 8, 1956. He was buried in Grand Junction's Orchard Mesa Cemetery.

== Early life ==
Walker was born in Marion, Kentucky on April 3, 1883. The son of Robert C. Walker, the owner of the Crittenden Press newspaper, Walter Walker was educated locally, and then moved to Colorado in 1903.

After settling in Grand Junction, Walker worked in the newspaper business, eventually becoming editor, manager, and chief owner of the Grand Junction Daily Sentinel. Walker's staff included Dalton Trumbo, whom Walker hired as a reporter in 1920, and employed for four years. In addition to running the newspaper, Walker was a civic activist, and his efforts included management of Grand Junction's successful lyceum.

== Political career ==
During the 1920s revival of the Ku Klux Klan, Walker was an early member. He subsequently turned against the group, and published editorials in opposition. In September 1925, several local Klan leaders including a deputy sheriff and a police officer assaulted Walker as he walked from a barber shop to his newspaper office. Others on the street eventually intervened, and before leaving to seek medical aid Walker informed the Klan members that physical intimidation would not prevent him from continuing his anti-Klan campaign. In 1924, 1928, and 1932, he was a delegate to the Democratic National Convention. From 1930 to 1932 he served as chairman of Colorado's Democratic state committee.

On September 26, 1932, Walker was appointed to the U.S. Senate, temporarily filling the vacancy caused by the death of Charles W. Waterman. He ran in the special election for the remainder of the term, but was defeated by Republican Karl C. Schuyler. Walker served until December 6, 1932, when Schuyler was sworn in.

== Later career ==
Walker resumed his work in the newspaper business following the completion of his Senate service. In 1936, he was again a delegate to the Democratic National Convention. Later that year, he was a presidential elector for the ticket of Franklin D. Roosevelt and John Nance Garner. In 1940, 1944, 1948, and 1952, he was again a delegate to the Democratic National Convention.

== Death and burial ==
Walker died in Grand Junction on October 8, 1956. He was interred at Orchard Mesa Cemetery in Grand Junction.

== Family ==
In November 1903, Walker married Kathie Wood (1882–1971) of Kentucky. They were the parents of a son, Preston (1912–1970).

== Legacy ==
Several Colorado Mesa University facilities are named for Walter Walker, including the soccer field and the reception area at the Moss Performing Arts Center.

In recognition of his advocacy for air service to Grand Junction in the early days of commercial aviation, the Grand Junction Regional Airport was named for Walker from 1942 until its 2007 expansion. The airport's terminal, fire station, and Walker Boulevard are all named in his honor.

The Walter Walker State Wildlife Area near Grand Junction is also named for Walker.

In 2008, statues of Walter Walker and his son Preston were installed at 634 Main Street in Grand Junction as part of the Legends of the Grand Valley project created by several local organizations.

== Sources ==
=== Newspapers ===
- "The Assault on Walker". Steamboat Pilot. Steamboat, CO. September 16, 1925. p. 1.
- "Walter Walker Leads Democrats". Greeley Daily Tribune. Greeley, CO. Associated Press. September 19, 1930. p. 12 – via Newspapers.com.
- "James Marsh New Chairman of Democrats". Greeley Daily Tribune. Greeley, CO. Associated Press. September 23, 1932. p. 1 – via Newspapers.com.
- "Walker Named to U.S. Senate". Ironwood Daily Globe. Ironwood, MI. Associated Press. September 27, 1932. p. 2 – via Newspapers.com.
- "Colorado Republican Carries Off Victory: Final Returns Show Schuyler Victory Over Walter Walker". Lincoln Star. Lincoln, NE. United Press International. November 20, 1932. p. 4 – via Newspapers.com.
- "Takes Seat in Senate". Lincoln Evening Journal. Lincoln, NE. United Press International. December 5, 1932. p. 1 – via Newspapers.com.
- "Earle Hitch Honored". Greeley Daily Tribune. Greeley, CO. Associated Press. May 2, 1939. p. 12 – via Newspapers.com.
- "Walter Walker, 73, Dies Suddenly at Grand Junction". Greeley Daily Tribune. Greeley, CO. Associated Press. October 9, 1956. p. 7 – via Newspapers.com.
- Anderson, Emily (May 17, 2007). "Walker Field Is No More". Aspen Times. Aspen, CO.
- "MSC Receives First $1 Million Private Donation: Names Soccer Field in Honor of Walter and Pres Walker". Colorado Mesa University News. Grand Junction, CO. September 19, 2008.
- "Sculpture Will Put Walkers Back in GJ". Daily Sentinel. Grand Junction, CO. December 8, 2008.
- "Way Up in the Willows: Walker Wildlife Area a Haven for Animals". Daily Sentinel. Grand Junction, CO. October 18, 2009.

=== Books ===
- Allard, Wayne (2007). Colorado's U.S. Senators: A Biographical Guide, 1876–2004. Fulcrum Publishing: Golden, CO. p. 43. ISBN 978-1-55591-656-5.
- Ceplair, Larry; Trumbo, Christopher (2015). Dalton Trumbo: Blacklisted Hollywood Radical. Lexington, KY: University Press of Kentucky. p. 25. ISBN 978-0-8131-4680-5.
- Goldberg, Robert Allen (1981). Hooded Empire: The Ku Klux Klan in Colorado. Chicago, IL: University of Illinois Press. p. 152. ISBN 9780252008481.
- Spencer, Thomas E. (1998). Where They're Buried. Baltimore, MD: Clearfield Company. p. 117. ISBN 978-0-8063-4823-0.

=== Magazines ===
- Padget, William (November 1, 1919). "Walter Walker, Lyceum Law Breaker". The Lyceum Magazine. Vol. 29. Chicago, IL: Ralph Albert Parlette. p. 37.
- Baird, J. Kenneth (Winter 1989). "The Ku Klux Klan in Grand Junction, 1924–1927" (PDF). Journal of the Western Slope. Grand Junction, CO: Mesa State College Historical Society. pp. 33–34.

=== Internet ===
- "Studying the Arts at CMU: Moss Performing Arts Center". The Arts at CMU. Grand Junction, CO: Colorado Mesa University.

Party political offices
Preceded by William Ellery Sweet	Democratic nominee for U.S. Senator from Colorado (Class 3); 1932	Succeeded by Alva B. Adams
U.S. Senate
Preceded by Charles W. Waterman	U.S. Senator (Class 2) from Colorado; 1932	Succeeded by Karl C. Schuyler
