= Karl C. Schuyler =

American politician

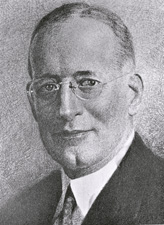

United States Senator from Colorado
- In office December 7, 1932 – March 3, 1933
- Preceded by: Walter Walker
- Succeeded by: Alva B. Adams

Personal details
- Born: Karl Cortlandt Schuyler; April 3, 1877 Colorado Springs, Colorado
- Died: July 31, 1933 (aged 56) New York City, New York
- Resting place: Fairmount Mausoleum, Fairmount Cemetery, Denver, Colorado
- Party: Republican
- Spouse: Delia Alsena Shepard (m. 1905–1933, his death)
- Children: 3
- Education: University of Denver
- Profession: Attorney; Business executive

Karl Cortlandt Schuyler (April 3, 1877 – July 31, 1933) was an American attorney and politician from Colorado. A Republican, he was most notable for his service as a United States senator from 1932 to 1933.

A native of Colorado Springs, Schuyler was educated in Colorado Springs public schools and worked at a variety of occupations, including teaching school and stenographer in a law office. After deciding on a career as an attorney, he attended the University of Denver's law school. He graduated in 1898, was admitted to the bar, and practiced successively in Cripple Creek, Colorado Springs, and Denver. Schuyler was recognized as a highly skilled corporate attorney, and represented railroads, mines, utilities, and other companies. He was also a civic activist, and served as a trustee of the University of Denver and Colorado Women's College.

Schuyler was a delegate to the 1916 Republican National Convention, and in 1919 he served as chairman of Colorado's state Republican convention. In 1920, he was an unsuccessful candidate for the U.S. Senate. In 1932, Schuyler ran for the U.S. Senate again, winning the Republican nomination. He was a candidate for both the regular and special elections, and narrowly won the special election as he handily lost the regular election. As a result, he served from December 7, 1932, to March 3, 1933.

On July 17, 1933, Schuyler was visiting Central Park in New York City when he was struck by an automobile. He was hospitalized, but did not recover, and he died on July 31. Schuyler was interred in Fairmount Mausoleum at Fairmount Cemetery in Denver.

== Early life ==
Karl C. Schuyler was born in Colorado Springs on April 3, 1877, a son of Frederick and Eleanor (Nellie) Farnan Schuyler. Schuyler attended the public schools of Colorado Springs, after which he became an employee of the Colorado Midland Railroad, taught school, and worked as a stenographer in a law office.

Schuyler was a descendant of Harmanus Schuyler (1727–1796), a cousin of Philip Schuyler, who served as an Assistant Deputy Commissary General during the American Revolution, responsible for acquiring and distributing supplies and equipment to soldiers of the Continental Army. As a result of this relationship, Karl Schuyler was a member of the Sons of the American Revolution.

== Career ==
He graduated from the University of Denver's law school in 1898, and was admitted to the bar. Schuyler practiced in Cripple Creek, and then Colorado Springs until he moved to Denver in 1905. Schuyler was a successful corporate attorney, and served as general counsel for the Florence and Cripple Creek Railroad, Midland Terminal Railway, Colorado Telephone Company, and the United States Reduction and Refining Company.

Schuyler was also a director or executive of several other corporations. He was a founder of the Midwest Oil and Refining Company, and served on the board of directors and as the company's counsel. In addition, he served as president of the Flower of the West Gold Mining Company and the Merritt Oil Corporation, and a member of the board of directors of the Gulf Oil Companies and the Amalgamated Royalty Oil Corporation. He also served as president of the Kinney-Coastal Oil Company and a director of the Denver National Bank.

In addition to practicing law, Schuyler was a civic activist; he was member of the board of trustees for both the University of Denver and the Colorado Women's College. During World War I, he was an organizer of several Liberty bond campaigns in Colorado, as well as fundraising campaigns for the American Red Cross. His fraternal memberships included the Elks and Masons.

== United States senator ==
A Republican, Schuyler was a delegate to the 1916 Republican National Convention, and chairman of Colorado's 1919 state Republican convention. He was an unsuccessful candidate for the U.S. Senate in 1920.

In 1932, he was elected to the Senate to fill the vacancy caused by the death of Charles W. Waterman; he served from December 7, 1932 to March 3, 1933. He was an unsuccessful candidate for the full term beginning on March 4, 1933. After leaving the Senate, Schuyler resumed his legal and business interests in Denver.

== Fatal crash ==
Schuyler was struck by a motorist in New York City on July 17, 1933. He had been staying at the St. Regis Hotel, and was walking in Central Park when the crash occurred.

== Death and burial ==
Schuyler was hospitalized for his injuries, and died on July 31. He had given the police an alias at the time of the accident, and later told a friend that he did so because he believed his injuries were not serious and he did not want to alarm his friends and family. He provided his real name when he was admitted to Lenox Hill Hospital, but the police report was not corrected until after his death. His wife was notified of the accident while he was hospitalized, and she arrived from Denver in time to be at his bedside when he died. Interment was in Fairmount Mausoleum at Fairmount Cemetery in Denver.

== Family ==
In 1905, Schuyler married Delia Alsena Shepard (1882–1973) of Colorado Springs. They were the parents of three children— William (born and died in 1908), Eleanor (1912–1999), and Karl Jr. (1914–1979). After Schuyler's death, his widow married Senator Eugene Millikin.

Party political offices
Preceded by Charles W. Waterman	Republican nominee for U.S. Senator from Colorado (Class 3); 1932 (special), 1932 (general)	Succeeded by Archibald A. Lee
U.S. Senate
Preceded by Walter Walker	U.S. Senator (Class 3) from Colorado; 1932–1933	Succeeded by Alva B. Adams
