= Rice W. Means =

American politician

Rice William Means
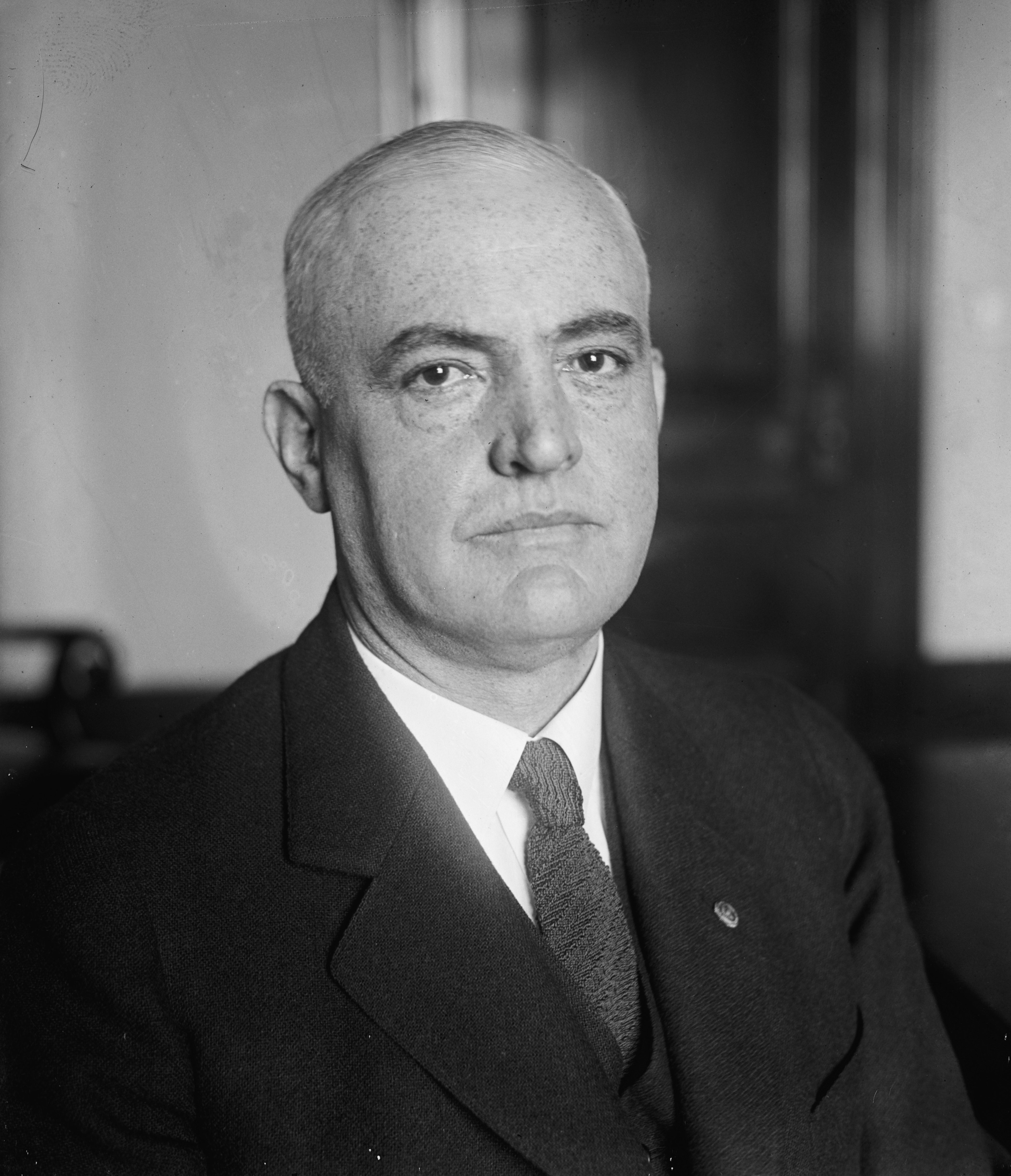

United States Senator from Colorado
- In office December 1, 1924 – March 3, 1927
- Preceded by: Alva B. Adams
- Succeeded by: Charles W. Waterman

Personal details
- Born: November 16, 1877 St. Joseph, Missouri
- Died: January 30, 1949 (aged 71) Denver, Colorado
- Party: Republican
- Education: University of Michigan Law School

Rice William Means (November 16, 1877 – January 30, 1949) was an American soldier, lawyer, and Ku Klux Klan leader. For three years, he was a Republican United States senator from Colorado - serving the remainder of his predecessor's term. He was defeated in the 1926 Republican primary by Charles W. Waterman on a wave of anti-KIan sentiment in the state.

== Early life, education, and military service ==
Born in St. Joseph, Missouri, he moved with his parents to Yuma County, Colorado in 1887. He settled in Denver in 1889, and attended the public schools and Sacred Heart College of Denver (now called Regis University).

During the Spanish–American War, he commanded a company in the Philippine campaign of 1899, for which he was awarded the Distinguished Service Cross. Means "distinguished himself before the fall of Manila by swimming the Singalon river to reconnoiter the Spanish works", escaping capture when he was spotted.

Returning from the war, he expressed a desire for the United States to permanently incorporate the Philippines, envisioning Manila surpassing Hong Kong as a trading center. In 1901, he graduated from the law department of the University of Michigan at Ann Arbor, and was admitted to the bar and commenced practice in Denver. From 1902 to 1904, he was county judge of Adams County, and in 1908 was an unsuccessful candidate for election to the Sixty-first United States Congress. Following this defeat, he was appointed deputy district attorney for Adams County, Colorado.

Means was elected commander-in-chief of the Army of the Philippines in 1913, and of the Veterans of Foreign Wars in 1914. He served during the First World War as a lieutenant colonel and commandant of the Fortieth Division School of Arms. He commanded the 4th Infantry in the Meuse–Argonne offensive.

Means ran for a seat in the U.S. Senate in 1920, losing the Republican nomination to Samuel D. Nicholson, who would go on to win the seat. He was attorney for the City and County of Denver in 1923 and 1924.

== Political career and later life ==
Means was elected as a Republican to the United States Senate on November 4, 1924, in a special election to fill the vacancy caused by Nicholson's death. During the campaign, his Democratic opponent nicknamed him "Puffed Rice", but this did not hinder Means' election.

Means was one of several candidates to have ties to the state's Ku Klux Klan organization. He served in the Senate from December 1, 1924, to March 3, 1927, chairing the Committee on Claims (Sixty-ninth Congress). During his tenure, he authored legislation deeming Armistice Day (later called Veterans Day) a national holiday in the United States. While a Senator, Means became directing head of the Ku Klux Klan in Colorado.

In 1926, he was an unsuccessful candidate for reelection, as he was again defeated in the Republican primary, this time by Charles W. Waterman, who "rode to victory on the wave of anti-Klan sentiment".

From 1926 to 1927, Means was commander in chief of the United Spanish War Veterans - bringing his past Klan affiliations into the spotlight. He denied any association with the Klan. In 1927, he became president of the National Tribune Corporation and publisher of the National Tribune and Stars and Stripes in Washington, D.C. Means fiercely criticized the FDR administration in response to the enactment of the initial New Deal measures in 1933, declaring them to be the product of "ruthless, vicious propaganda" and "a stain upon the honor of the United States".

Means retired in 1937, and died in Denver on January 30, 1949, following a six-month bout with heart problems. He was interred in Denver's Fairmount Cemetery.

Party political offices
Preceded by Samuel D. Nicholson	Republican nominee for U.S. Senator from Colorado (Class 3); 1924	Succeeded by Charles W. Waterman
U.S. Senate
Preceded by Alva B. Adams	U.S. Senator (Class 3) from Colorado; 1924–1927	Succeeded by Charles W. Waterman
