= Samuel D. Nicholson =

American politician

Samuel Danford Nicholson
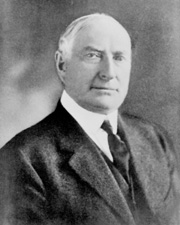

United States Senator from Colorado
- In office March 4, 1921 – March 24, 1923
- Preceded by: Charles S. Thomas
- Succeeded by: Alva B. Adams

Personal details
- Born: February 22, 1859 Springfield, Prince Edward Island, Province of Canada
- Died: March 24, 1923 (aged 64) Denver, Colorado, U.S.
- Party: Republican

Samuel Danford Nicholson (February 22, 1859 – March 24, 1923) was a United States senator from Colorado.

Nicholson was born on Feb. 22, 1859 in Springfield, Prince Edward Island, British North America, he attended the public schools there and moved to Michigan and then to Nebraska and later, in 1881, to Leadville, Colorado.

Nicholson became interested in mining, and advanced from miner to foreman, superintendent, manager, and then president of the Western Mining Company. He discovered the zinc ore that bears his name, Nicholsonite.

From 1893 to 1897, Nicholson was the Populist mayor of Leadville; he moved to Denver in 1902. In 1914 and 1916, he was an unsuccessful candidate for governor. During the First World War, he served as State chairman of the Liberty Loan and Victory loan campaigns, and was a member of the United States Fuel Administration. He was elected as a Republican to the United States Senate and served from March 4, 1921, until his death in Denver on March 24, 1923. His interment was in Fairmount Cemetery in Denver.

== See also ==
- List of United States senators born outside the United States
- List of members of the United States Congress who died in office (1900–1949)

Party political offices
Preceded by Hubert Work	Republican nominee for U.S. Senator from Colorado (Class 3); 1920	Succeeded by Rice W. Means
U.S. Senate
Preceded by Charles S. Thomas	U.S. Senator (Class 2) from Colorado; 1921–1923	Succeeded by Alva B. Adams
