= Political party strength in Colorado =

Politics in the US state of Colorado

The following table indicates the party of elected officials in the U.S. state of Colorado:

- Governor
- Lieutenant Governor
- Secretary of State
- Attorney General
- State Treasurer

The table also indicates the historical party composition in the:

- State Senate
- State House of Representatives
- State delegation to the U.S. Senate
- State delegation to the U.S. House of Representatives

For years in which a presidential election was held, the table indicates which party's nominees received the state's electoral votes.

== Pre-statehood (1861–1875) ==
Year	Executive offices				Territorial Assembly		U.S. Congress
Year	Governor	Secretary of State	Attorney General	Treasurer	Territorial Council	House	Delegate
1861	William Gilpin (R) (Note: The territory was formed on February 28, 1861, but no governor was appointed until March 25, 1861. Gilpin himself did not arrive in the territory until May 27, 1861. Removed from office for improper financial drafts from the federal treasury.)	Lewis Ledyard Weld (NP)	James E. Dalliba (R)	George T. Clark (R)	[?]	[?]	Hiram Pitt Bennet (CR)
1862	William Gilpin (R)	Lewis Ledyard Weld (NP)	James E. Dalliba (R)	George T. Clark (R)	[?]	[?]	Hiram Pitt Bennet (CR)
1863	John Evans (R) (Note: Resigned at the request, made July 18, 1865, of President Andrew Johnson following the Sand Creek massacre.)	Samuel Hitt Elbert (R)	Samuel E. Brown (R)	George T. Clark (R)	[?]	[?]	Hiram Pitt Bennet (CR)
1864	John Evans (R)	Samuel Hitt Elbert (R)	Samuel E. Brown (R)	Alexander W. Atkins (NP)	[?]	[?]	Hiram Pitt Bennet (CR)
1865	John Evans (R)	Samuel Hitt Elbert (R)	Samuel E. Brown (R)	Alexander W. Atkins (NP)	[?]	[?]	Allen Alexander Bradford (R)
1866	Alexander Cummings (R)	Frank Hall (NP)	George W. Chamberlain (R)	Alexander Cameron Hunt (NP)	[?]	[?]	Allen Alexander Bradford (R)
1867	Alexander Cummings (R)	Frank Hall (NP)	George W. Chamberlain (R)	John Wanless (NP)	[?]	[?]	George M. Chilcott (R)
1868	Alexander Cameron Hunt (I)	Frank Hall (NP)	George W. Chamberlain (R)	Columbus Nuckolls (NP)	[?]	[?]	George M. Chilcott (R)
1869	Alexander Cameron Hunt (I)	Frank Hall (NP)	George W. Chamberlain (R)	Columbus Nuckolls (NP)	[?]	[?]	Allen Alexander Bradford (R)
1870	Edward M. McCook (R) (Note: Removed from office by petition.)	Frank Hall (NP)	Henry C. Thatcher (R)	George T. Clark (R)	[?]	[?]	Allen Alexander Bradford (R)
1871	Edward M. McCook (R)	Frank Hall (NP)	Henry C. Thatcher (R)	George T. Clark (R)	[?]	[?]	Jerome B. Chaffee (R)
1872	Edward M. McCook (R)	Frank Hall (NP)	Henry C. Thatcher (R)	George T. Clark (R)	[?]	[?]	Jerome B. Chaffee (R)
1873	Samuel Hitt Elbert (I) (Note: Records show Elbert served "less than a year", but his successor was appointed on June 19, 1874, which was 14 months after Elbert took office.)	Frank Hall (NP)	vacant (Note: Position was filled by the U.S. Attorney due to lack of funding by the territorial government.)	George T. Clark (R)	[?]	[?]	Jerome B. Chaffee (R)
1874	Edward M. McCook (R)	John W. Jenkins (NP)	vacant	David H. Moffat (NP)	[?]	[?]	Jerome B. Chaffee (R)
1875	John Long Routt (R)	John Taffe (NP)	vacant	David H. Moffat (NP)	[?]	[?]	Thomas M. Patterson (D)

== 1876–present ==
Year	Executive offices					General Assembly		United States Congress			Electoral votes
Year	Governor	Lieutenant Governor	Secretary of State	Attorney General	Treasurer	State Senate	State House	U.S. Senator (Class II)	U.S. Senator (Class III)	U.S. House	Electoral votes
1876	John Long Routt (R)	Lafayette Head (R)	William Clark (R)	vacant	Fred Z. Solomon (NP)	19R, 7D	31R, 18D	Henry M. Teller (R)	Jerome B. Chaffee (R)	James B. Belford (R)	Hayes/ Wheeler (R) ✓
1877	John Long Routt (R)	Lafayette Head (R)	William Clark (R)	A. J. Sampson (R)	George C. Corning (NP)	19R, 7D	31R, 18D	Henry M. Teller (R)	Jerome B. Chaffee (R)	Thomas M. Patterson (D)	Hayes/ Wheeler (R) ✓
1878	John Long Routt (R)	Lafayette Head (R)	William Clark (R)	A. J. Sampson (R)	George C. Corning (NP)	19R, 7D	31R, 18D	Henry M. Teller (R)	Jerome B. Chaffee (R)	Thomas M. Patterson (D)	Hayes/ Wheeler (R) ✓
1879	Frederick Walker Pitkin (R)	Horace Tabor (R)	Norman H. Meldrum (R)	Charles W. Wright (R)	Nathan C. Culver (NP)	19R, 7D	36R, 12D, 1GB	Henry M. Teller (R)	Nathaniel P. Hill (R)	James B. Belford (R)	Hayes/ Wheeler (R) ✓
1880	Frederick Walker Pitkin (R)	Horace Tabor (R)	Norman H. Meldrum (R)	Charles W. Wright (R)	Nathan C. Culver (NP)	19R, 7D	36R, 12D, 1GB	Henry M. Teller (R)	Nathaniel P. Hill (R)	James B. Belford (R)	Garfield/ Arthur (R) ✓
1881	Frederick Walker Pitkin (R)	Horace Tabor (R)	Norman H. Meldrum (R)	Charles H. Toll (R)	W. C. Sanders (NP)	23R, 3D	36R, 13D	Henry M. Teller (R)	Nathaniel P. Hill (R)	James B. Belford (R)	Garfield/ Arthur (R) ✓
1882	Frederick Walker Pitkin (R)	Horace Tabor (R)	Norman H. Meldrum (R)	Charles H. Toll (R)	W. C. Sanders (NP)	23R, 3D	36R, 13D	George M. Chilcott (R)	Nathaniel P. Hill (R)	James B. Belford (R)	Garfield/ Arthur (R) ✓
1883	James Benton Grant (D)	William H. Meyer (R)	Melvin Edwards (R)	David F. Urmy (R)	Fred Walsen (NP)	17R, 9D	36R, 13D	Horace Tabor (R)	Nathaniel P. Hill (R)	James B. Belford (R)	Garfield/ Arthur (R) ✓
1883	James Benton Grant (D)	William H. Meyer (R)	Melvin Edwards (R)	David F. Urmy (R)	Fred Walsen (NP)	17R, 9D	36R, 13D	Thomas M. Bowen (R)	Nathaniel P. Hill (R)	James B. Belford (R)	Garfield/ Arthur (R) ✓
1884	James Benton Grant (D)	William H. Meyer (R)	Melvin Edwards (R)	David F. Urmy (R)	Fred Walsen (NP)	17R, 9D	36R, 13D	Thomas M. Bowen (R)	Nathaniel P. Hill (R)	James B. Belford (R)	Blaine/ Logan (R) ✗
1885	Benjamin Harrison Eaton (R)	Peter W. Breene (R)	Melvin Edwards (R)	Theodore H. Thomas (R)	George R. Swallow (NP)	19R, 7D	35R, 13D, 1I	Thomas M. Bowen (R)	Henry M. Teller (R)	George G. Symes (R)	Blaine/ Logan (R) ✗
1886	Benjamin Harrison Eaton (R)	Peter W. Breene (R)	Melvin Edwards (R)	Theodore H. Thomas (R)	George R. Swallow (NP)	19R, 7D	35R, 13D, 1I	Thomas M. Bowen (R)	Henry M. Teller (R)	George G. Symes (R)	Blaine/ Logan (R) ✗
1887	Alva Adams (D)	Norman H. Meldrum (R)	James Rice (R)	Alvin Marsh (R)	Peter W. Breene (NP)	18R, 8D	25R, 23D, 1I	Thomas M. Bowen (R)	Henry M. Teller (R)	George G. Symes (R)	Blaine/ Logan (R) ✗
1888	Alva Adams (D)	Norman H. Meldrum (R)	James Rice (R)	Alvin Marsh (R)	Peter W. Breene (NP)	18R, 8D	25R, 23D, 1I	Thomas M. Bowen (R)	Henry M. Teller (R)	George G. Symes (R)	Harrison/ Morton (R) ✓
1889	Job Adams Cooper (R)	William Grover Smith (R)	James Rice (R)	Samuel W. Jones (R)	William Brisbane (NP)	20R, 6D	43R, 6D	Edward O. Wolcott (R)	Henry M. Teller (R)	Hosea; Townsend (R)	Harrison/ Morton (R) ✓
1890	Job Adams Cooper (R)	William Grover Smith (R)	James Rice (R)	Samuel W. Jones (R)	William Brisbane (NP)	20R, 6D	43R, 6D	Edward O. Wolcott (R)	Henry M. Teller (R)	Hosea; Townsend (R)	Harrison/ Morton (R) ✓
1891	John Long Routt (R)	William Story (R)	Edward J. Eaton (R)	Joseph H. Maupin (D)	James N. Carlile (NP)	16R, 10D	32R, 17D	Edward O. Wolcott (R)	Henry M. Teller (R)	Hosea; Townsend (R)	Harrison/ Morton (R) ✓
1892	John Long Routt (R)	William Story (R)	Edward J. Eaton (R)	Joseph H. Maupin (D)	James N. Carlile (NP)	16R, 10D	32R, 17D	Edward O. Wolcott (R)	Henry M. Teller (R)	Hosea; Townsend (R)	Weaver/ Field (Pop) ✗
1893	Davis Hanson Waite (Pop)	David H. Nichols (Pop)	Nelson O. McCless (Pop)	Eugene Engley (D)	Albert Nance (NP)	15R, 12Pop, 8D (Note: A coalition of Democrats and Populists elected a Democrat, Casimiro Barela, as President Pro Tempore and organized the chamber.)	33R, 27Pop, 5D	Edward O. Wolcott (R)	Henry M. Teller (R)	2P	Weaver/ Field (Pop) ✗
1894	Davis Hanson Waite (Pop)	David H. Nichols (Pop)	Nelson O. McCless (Pop)	Eugene Engley (D)	Albert Nance (NP)	15R, 12Pop, 8D	33R, 27Pop, 5D	Edward O. Wolcott (R)	Henry M. Teller (R)	2P	Weaver/ Field (Pop) ✗
1895	Albert McIntire (R)	Jared L. Brush (R)	Albert B. McGaffey (R)	Byron L. Carr (R)	Harry E. Mulnix (NP)	18Pop, 16R, 1D	41R, 14Pop, 10D	Edward O. Wolcott (R)	Henry M. Teller (R)	1Pop, 1R	Weaver/ Field (Pop) ✗
1896	Albert McIntire (R)	Jared L. Brush (R)	Albert B. McGaffey (R)	Byron L. Carr (R)	Harry E. Mulnix (NP)	18Pop, 16R, 1D	41R, 14Pop, 10D	Edward O. Wolcott (R)	Henry M. Teller (R)	1Pop, 1R	Bryan/ Sewall (D/SvR) ✗
1897	Alva Adams (D)	Jared L. Brush (R)	Charles H.S. Whipple (D)	Byron L. Carr (R)	George W. Kephart (NP)	16R, 14Pop, 4D, 1SvR (Note: A coalition of Democrats, Populists, Silver Republicans elected a Populist, Francis Patrick Carney, as President Pro Tempore and organized the chamber.)	33Pop, 20D, 11R, 1SvR	Edward O. Wolcott (R)	Henry M. Teller (SvR)	1Pop, 1SvR	Bryan/ Sewall (D/SvR) ✗
1898	Alva Adams (D)	Jared L. Brush (R)	Charles H.S. Whipple (D)	Byron L. Carr (R)	George W. Kephart (NP)	16R, 14Pop, 4D, 1SvR	33Pop, 20D, 11R, 1SvR	Edward O. Wolcott (R)	Henry M. Teller (SvR)	1Pop, 1SvR	Bryan/ Sewall (D/SvR) ✗
1899	Charles S. Thomas (D)	Francis Patrick Carney (Pop)	Elmer F. Beckwith (D)	David M. Campbell (D)	John H. Fesler (NP)	15SvR, 9Pop, 9D, 2R (Note: A coalition of Democrats, Populists, Silver Republicans elected a Silver Republican, John R. Schermerhorn, as President Pro Tempore and organized the chamber.)	21D, 20Pop, 16SvR, 6R (Note: A coalition of Democrats, Populists, Silver Republicans elected a Silver Republican, William Grover Smith, as Speaker and organized the chamber.)	Edward O. Wolcott (R)	Henry M. Teller (SvR)	1Pop, 1SvR	Bryan/ Sewall (D/SvR) ✗
1900	Charles S. Thomas (D)	Francis Patrick Carney (Pop)	Elmer F. Beckwith (D)	David M. Campbell (D)	John H. Fesler (NP)	15SvR, 9Pop, 9D, 2R	21D, 20Pop, 16SvR, 6R	Edward O. Wolcott (R)	Henry M. Teller (SvR)	1Pop, 1SvR	Bryan/ Stevenson (D) ✗
1901	James Bradley Orman (D)	David C. Coates (D)	David A. Mills (D)	Charles C. Post (R)	James N. Chipley (NP)	19D, 7Pop, 6SvR, 2R, 1ST	37D, 13Pop, 8SvR, 7R	Thomas M. Patterson (D)	Henry M. Teller (SvR)	1Pop, 1SvR	Bryan/ Stevenson (D) ✗
1902	James Bradley Orman (D)	Warren A. Haggott (R)	David A. Mills (D)	Charles C. Post (R)	James N. Chipley (NP)	19D, 7Pop, 6SvR, 2R, 1ST	37D, 13Pop, 8SvR, 7R	Thomas M. Patterson (D)	Henry M. Teller (SvR)	1Pop, 1SvR	Bryan/ Stevenson (D) ✗
1903	James Hamilton Peabody (R)	Jesse Fuller McDonald (R)	James Cowie (R)	Nathan C. Miller (R)	Whitney Newton (NP)	24D, 11R	36R, 29D	Thomas M. Patterson (D)	Henry M. Teller (D)	2R, 1D	Bryan/ Stevenson (D) ✗
1904	James Hamilton Peabody (R)	Jesse Fuller McDonald (R)	James Cowie (R)	Nathan C. Miller (R)	Whitney Newton (NP)	24D, 11R	36R, 29D	Thomas M. Patterson (D)	Henry M. Teller (D)	3R	Roosevelt/ Fairbanks (R) ✓
1905	Alva Adams (D) (Note: The 1904 election was rife with fraud and controversy. Adams took office, but soon afterwards the Republican-majority state legislature declared James Peabody to be the actual winner, on the condition that Peabody immediately resign. Since Peabody had been governor for a few moments before resigning, it was his lieutenant governor, Jesse McDonald, that succeeded to the governorship. In all, Colorado had three governors on March 17, 1905.)	Arthur Cornforth (D)	James Cowie (R)	Nathan C. Miller (R)	John A. Holmbert (NP)	19R, 16D	36R, 29D	Thomas M. Patterson (D)	Henry M. Teller (D)	3R	Roosevelt/ Fairbanks (R) ✓
1905	James Hamilton Peabody (R)	Jesse Fuller McDonald (R)	James Cowie (R)	Nathan C. Miller (R)	John A. Holmbert (NP)	19R, 16D	36R, 29D	Thomas M. Patterson (D)	Henry M. Teller (D)	3R	Roosevelt/ Fairbanks (R) ✓
1905	Jesse Fuller McDonald (R)	Fred W. Parks (R)	James Cowie (R)	Nathan C. Miller (R)	John A. Holmbert (NP)	19R, 16D	36R, 29D	Thomas M. Patterson (D)	Henry M. Teller (D)	3R	Roosevelt/ Fairbanks (R) ✓
1906	Jesse Fuller McDonald (R)	Fred W. Parks (R)	James Cowie (R)	Nathan C. Miller (R)	John A. Holmbert (NP)	19R, 16D	36R, 29D	Thomas M. Patterson (D)	Henry M. Teller (D)	3R	Roosevelt/ Fairbanks (R) ✓
1907	Henry Augustus Buchtel (R)	Erastus Harper (R)	Timothy O'Connor (R)	William H. Dickson (R)	Alfred E. Bent (NP)	24R, 11D	46R, 19D	Simon Guggenheim (R)	Henry M. Teller (D)	3R	Roosevelt/ Fairbanks (R) ✓
1908	Henry Augustus Buchtel (R)	Erastus Harper (R)	Timothy O'Connor (R)	William H. Dickson (R)	Alfred E. Bent (NP)	24R, 11D	46R, 19D	Simon Guggenheim (R)	Henry M. Teller (D)	3R	Bryan/ Kern (D) ✗
1909	John F. Shafroth (D)	Stephen R. Fitzgarrald (D)	James B. Pearce (D)	John T. Barnett (D)	W. J. Galligan (NP)	20D, 15R	53D, 12R	Simon Guggenheim (R)	Charles J. Hughes Jr. (D)	3D	Bryan/ Kern (D) ✗
1910	John F. Shafroth (D)	Stephen R. Fitzgarrald (D)	James B. Pearce (D)	John T. Barnett (D)	W. J. Galligan (NP)	20D, 15R	53D, 12R	Simon Guggenheim (R)	Charles J. Hughes Jr. (D)	3D	Bryan/ Kern (D) ✗
1911	John F. Shafroth (D)	Stephen R. Fitzgarrald (D)	James B. Pearce (D)	Benjamin Griffith (R)	Roady Kenehan (NP)	26D, 9R	40D, 25R	Simon Guggenheim (R)	vacant	3D	Bryan/ Kern (D) ✗
1912	John F. Shafroth (D)	Stephen R. Fitzgarrald (D)	James B. Pearce (D)	Benjamin Griffith (R)	Roady Kenehan (NP)	26D, 9R	40D, 25R	Simon Guggenheim (R)	vacant	3D	Wilson/ Marshall (D) ✓
1913	Elias M. Ammons (D)	Stephen R. Fitzgarrald (D)	James B. Pearce (D)	Fred Farrar (D)	M. A. Leddy (NP)	24D, 11R	48D, 17R	John F. Shafroth (D)	Charles S. Thomas (D)	4D	Wilson/ Marshall (D) ✓
1914	Elias M. Ammons (D)	Stephen R. Fitzgarrald (D)	James B. Pearce (D)	Fred Farrar (D)	M. A. Leddy (NP)	24D, 11R	48D, 17R	John F. Shafroth (D)	Charles S. Thomas (D)	4D	Wilson/ Marshall (D) ✓
1915	George Alfred Carlson (R)	Moses E. Lewis (R)	John E. Ramer (R)	Fred Farrar (D)	Allison Stocker (NP)	18R, 17D	36R, 29D	John F. Shafroth (D)	Charles S. Thomas (D)	3D, 1R	Wilson/ Marshall (D) ✓
1916	George Alfred Carlson (R)	Moses E. Lewis (R)	John E. Ramer (R)	Fred Farrar (D)	Allison Stocker (NP)	18R, 17D	36R, 29D	John F. Shafroth (D)	Charles S. Thomas (D)	3D, 1R	Wilson/ Marshall (D) ✓
1917	Julius Caldeen Gunter (D)	James Pulliam (D)	James R. Noland (D)	Leslie E. Hubbard (D)	Robert H. Higgins (NP)	18D, 17R	45D, 20R	John F. Shafroth (D)	Charles S. Thomas (D)	3D, 1R	Wilson/ Marshall (D) ✓
1918	Julius Caldeen Gunter (D)	James Pulliam (D)	James R. Noland (D)	Leslie E. Hubbard (D)	Robert H. Higgins (NP)	18D, 17R	45D, 20R	John F. Shafroth (D)	Charles S. Thomas (D)	3D, 1R	Wilson/ Marshall (D) ✓
1919	Oliver Henry Shoup (R)	George Stephan (R)	James R. Noland (D)	Victor E. Keyes (R)	Harry E. Mulnix (NP)	21D, 14R	41R, 24D	Lawrence C. Phipps (R)	Charles S. Thomas (D)	3R, 1D	Wilson/ Marshall (D) ✓
1920	Oliver Henry Shoup (R)	George Stephan (R)	James R. Noland (D)	Victor E. Keyes (R)	Harry E. Mulnix (NP)	21D, 14R	41R, 24D	Lawrence C. Phipps (R)	Charles S. Thomas (D)	3R, 1D	Harding/ Coolidge (R) ✓
1921	Oliver Henry Shoup (R)	Earl Cooley (R)	Carl Miliken (R)	Victor E. Keyes (R)	Arthur Strong (NP)	24R, 11D	58R, 7D	Lawrence C. Phipps (R)	Samuel D. Nicholson (R)	3R, 1D	Harding/ Coolidge (R) ✓
1922	Oliver Henry Shoup (R)	Earl Cooley (R)	Carl Miliken (R)	Victor E. Keyes (R)	Arthur Strong (NP)	24R, 11D	58R, 7D	Lawrence C. Phipps (R)	Samuel D. Nicholson (R)	3R, 1D	Harding/ Coolidge (R) ✓
1923	William Ellery Sweet (D)	Robert F. Rockwell (R)	Carl Miliken (R)	Russel W. Fleming (D)	Harry E. Mulnix (NP)	24R, 11D	33R, 32D	Lawrence C. Phipps (R)	Alva B. Adams (D)	3R, 1D	Harding/ Coolidge (R) ✓
1924	William Ellery Sweet (D)	Robert F. Rockwell (R)	Carl Miliken (R)	Wayne C. Williams (D)	Harry E. Mulnix (NP)	24R, 11D	33R, 32D	Lawrence C. Phipps (R)	Rice W. Means (R)	3R, 1D	Coolidge/ Dawes (R) ✓
1925	Clarence Morley (R)	Sterling Byrd Lacy (D)	Carl Miliken (R)	William Boatright (R)	W. D. MacGinnis (NP)	21R, 14D	53R, 12D	Lawrence C. Phipps (R)	Rice W. Means (R)	3R, 1D	Coolidge/ Dawes (R) ✓
1926	Clarence Morley (R)	Sterling Byrd Lacy (D)	Carl Miliken (R)	William Boatright (R)	W. D. MacGinnis (NP)	21R, 14D	53R, 12D	Lawrence C. Phipps (R)	Rice W. Means (R)	3R, 1D	Coolidge/ Dawes (R) ✓
1927	Billy Adams (D)	George Milton Corlett (R)	Charles Armstrong (R)	William Boatright (R)	Harry E. Mulnix (NP)	20R, 15D	43R, 22D	Lawrence C. Phipps (R)	Charles W. Waterman (R)	2R, 2D	Coolidge/ Dawes (R) ✓
1928	Billy Adams (D)	George Milton Corlett (R)	Charles Armstrong (R)	William Boatright (R)	Herbert Fairall (NP)	20R, 15D	43R, 22D	Lawrence C. Phipps (R)	Charles W. Waterman (R)	2R, 2D	Hoover/ Curtis (R) ✓
1929	Billy Adams (D)	George Milton Corlett (R)	Charles Armstrong (R)	Robert E. Winbourn (R)	W. D. MacGinnis (NP)	24R, 11D	46R, 19D	Lawrence C. Phipps (R)	Charles W. Waterman (R)	3R, 1D	Hoover/ Curtis (R) ✓
1930	Billy Adams (D)	George Milton Corlett (R)	Charles Armstrong (R)	John S. Underwood (R)	W. D. MacGinnis (NP)	24R, 11D	46R, 19D	Lawrence C. Phipps (R)	Charles W. Waterman (R)	3R, 1D	Hoover/ Curtis (R) ✓
1931	Billy Adams (D)	Edwin C. Johnson (D)	Charles Armstrong (R)	Clarence L. Ireland (R)	John M. Jackson (NP)	22R, 13D	34D, 31R	Edward P. Costigan (D)	Charles W. Waterman (R)	3R, 1D	Hoover/ Curtis (R) ✓
1932	Billy Adams (D)	Edwin C. Johnson (D)	Charles Armstrong (R)	Clarence L. Ireland (R)	John M. Jackson (NP)	22R, 13D	34D, 31R	Edward P. Costigan (D)	Walter Walker (D)	3R, 1D	Roosevelt/ Garner (D) ✓
1933	Edwin C. Johnson (D) (Note: Resigned to take elected seat in the United States Senate.)	Ray Herbert Talbot (D)	Charles Armstrong (R)	Paul P. Prosser (D)	Homer Bedford (D)	26D, 9R	54D, 11R	Edward P. Costigan (D)	Karl C. Schuyler (R)	4D	Roosevelt/ Garner (D) ✓
1934	Edwin C. Johnson (D)	Ray Herbert Talbot (D)	Charles Armstrong (R)	Paul P. Prosser (D)	Homer Bedford (D)	26D, 9R	54D, 11R	Edward P. Costigan (D)	Alva B. Adams (D)	4D	Roosevelt/ Garner (D) ✓
1935	Edwin C. Johnson (D)	Ray Herbert Talbot (D)	James Carr (D)	Paul P. Prosser (D)	Charles Armstrong (R)	29D, 6R	50D, 15R	Edward P. Costigan (D)	Alva B. Adams (D)	4D	Roosevelt/ Garner (D) ✓
1936	Edwin C. Johnson (D)	Ray Herbert Talbot (D)	George Saunders (D)	Byron G. Rogers (D)	Charles Armstrong (R)	29D, 6R	50D, 15R	Edward P. Costigan (D)	Alva B. Adams (D)	4D	Roosevelt/ Garner (D) ✓
1937	Ray Herbert Talbot (D) (Note: As lieutenant governor, filled unexpired term.)	vacant	George Saunders (D)	Byron G. Rogers (D)	Homer Bedford (D)	29D, 6R	50D, 15R	Edwin C. Johnson (D)	Alva B. Adams (D)	4D	Roosevelt/ Garner (D) ✓
1937	Teller Ammons (D)	Frank J. Hayes (D)	George Saunders (D)	Byron G. Rogers (D)	Homer Bedford (D)	29D, 6R	50D, 15R	Edwin C. Johnson (D)	Alva B. Adams (D)	4D	Roosevelt/ Garner (D) ✓
1938	Teller Ammons (D)	Frank J. Hayes (D)	George Saunders (D)	Byron G. Rogers (D)	Homer Bedford (D)	29D, 6R	50D, 15R	Edwin C. Johnson (D)	Alva B. Adams (D)	4D	Roosevelt/ Garner (D) ✓
1939	Ralph Lawrence Carr (R)	John Charles Vivian (R)	George Saunders (D)	Byron G. Rogers (D)	Charles Armstrong (R)	23D, 12R	37R, 28D	Edwin C. Johnson (D)	Alva B. Adams (D)	4D	Roosevelt/ Garner (D) ✓
1940	Ralph Lawrence Carr (R)	John Charles Vivian (R)	George Saunders (D)	Byron G. Rogers (D)	Charles Armstrong (R)	23D, 12R	37R, 28D	Edwin C. Johnson (D)	Alva B. Adams (D)	4D	Willkie/ McNary (R) ✗
1941	Ralph Lawrence Carr (R)	John Charles Vivian (R)	Walter Morrison (R)	Gail L. Ireland (R)	Homer Bedford (D)	18D, 17R	37R, 28D	Edwin C. Johnson (D)	Eugene Millikin (R)	3R, 1D	Willkie/ McNary (R) ✗
1942	Ralph Lawrence Carr (R)	John Charles Vivian (R)	Walter Morrison (R)	Gail L. Ireland (R)	Homer Bedford (D)	18D, 17R	37R, 28D	Edwin C. Johnson (D)	Eugene Millikin (R)	3R, 1D	Willkie/ McNary (R) ✗
1943	John Charles Vivian (R)	William Eugene Higby (R)	Walter Morrison (R)	Gail L. Ireland (R)	Leon Lavington (R)	23R, 12D	55R, 10D	Edwin C. Johnson (D)	Eugene Millikin (R)	4R	Willkie/ McNary (R) ✗
1944	John Charles Vivian (R)	William Eugene Higby (R)	Walter Morrison (R)	Gail L. Ireland (R)	Leon Lavington (R)	23R, 12D	55R, 10D	Edwin C. Johnson (D)	Eugene Millikin (R)	4R	Dewey/ Bricker (R) ✗
1945	John Charles Vivian (R)	William Eugene Higby (R)	Walter Morrison (R)	H. Lawrence Hinkley (R)	Homer Bedford (D)	27R, 8D	46R, 19D	Edwin C. Johnson (D)	Eugene Millikin (R)	4R	Dewey/ Bricker (R) ✗
1946	John Charles Vivian (R)	William Eugene Higby (R)	Walter Morrison (R)	H. Lawrence Hinkley (R)	Homer Bedford (D)	27R, 8D	46R, 19D	Edwin C. Johnson (D)	Eugene Millikin (R)	4R	Dewey/ Bricker (R) ✗
1947	William Lee Knous (D) (Note: Resigned to take a seat on the United States District Court for the District of Colorado.)	Homer Pearson (D)	Walter Morrison (R)	H. Lawrence Hinkley (R)	Rodney Anderson (R)	27R, 8D	46R, 19D	Edwin C. Johnson (D)	Eugene Millikin (R)	3R, 1D	Dewey/ Bricker (R) ✗
1948	William Lee Knous (D)	Homer Pearson (D)	Walter Morrison (R)	H. Lawrence Hinkley (R)	Rodney Anderson (R)	27R, 8D	46R, 19D	Edwin C. Johnson (D)	Eugene Millikin (R)	3R, 1D	Truman/ Barkley (D)
1949	William Lee Knous (D)	Walter Walford Johnson (D)	George Baker (D)	John W. Metzger (D)	Homer Bedford (D)	19R, 16D	39D, 26R	Edwin C. Johnson (D)	Eugene Millikin (R)	3D, 1R	Truman/ Barkley (D)
1950	William Lee Knous (D)	Walter Walford Johnson (D)	George Baker (D)	John W. Metzger (D)	Homer Bedford (D)	19R, 16D	39D, 26R	Edwin C. Johnson (D)	Eugene Millikin (R)	3D, 1R	Truman/ Barkley (D)
1950	Walter Walford Johnson (D)	Charles P. Murphy (R)	George Baker (D)	John W. Metzger (D)	Homer Bedford (D)	19R, 16D	39D, 26R	Edwin C. Johnson (D)	Eugene Millikin (R)	3D, 1R	Truman/ Barkley (D)
1951	Daniel I. J. Thornton (R)	Gordon Allott (R)	George Baker (D)	Duke W. Dunbar (R)	Earl E. Ewing (R)	20R, 15D	47R, 18D	Edwin C. Johnson (D)	Eugene Millikin (R)	2D, 2R	Truman/ Barkley (D)
1952	Daniel I. J. Thornton (R)	Gordon Allott (R)	George Baker (D)	Duke W. Dunbar (R)	Earl E. Ewing (R)	20R, 15D	47R, 18D	Edwin C. Johnson (D)	Eugene Millikin (R)	2D, 2R	Eisenhower/ Nixon (R) ✓
1953	Daniel I. J. Thornton (R)	Gordon Allott (R)	Homer Bruce (R)	Duke W. Dunbar (R)	Homer Bedford (D)	23R, 12D	45R, 20D	Edwin C. Johnson (D)	Eugene Millikin (R)	2D, 2R	Eisenhower/ Nixon (R) ✓
1954	Daniel I. J. Thornton (R)	Gordon Allott (R)	Homer Bruce (R)	Duke W. Dunbar (R)	Homer Bedford (D)	23R, 12D	45R, 20D	Edwin C. Johnson (D)	Eugene Millikin (R)	2D, 2R	Eisenhower/ Nixon (R) ✓
1955	Edwin C. Johnson (D)	Stephen McNichols (D)	George Baker (D)	Duke W. Dunbar (R)	Earl E. Ewing (R)	20R, 15D	38R, 27D	Gordon Allott (R)	Eugene Millikin (R)	2D, 2R	Eisenhower/ Nixon (R) ✓
1956	Edwin C. Johnson (D)	Stephen McNichols (D)	George Baker (D)	Duke W. Dunbar (R)	Earl E. Ewing (R)	20R, 15D	38R, 27D	Gordon Allott (R)	Eugene Millikin (R)	2D, 2R	Eisenhower/ Nixon (R) ✓
1957	Stephen McNichols (D) (Note: Gubernatorial terms changed from two to four years during McNichols' term; his first term was two years, his second term was four years.)	Frank L. Hays (R)	George Baker (D)	Duke W. Dunbar (R)	Homer Bedford (D)	21D, 14R	38D, 27R	Gordon Allott (R)	John A. Carroll (D)	2D, 2R	Eisenhower/ Nixon (R) ✓
1958	Stephen McNichols (D)	Frank L. Hays (R)	George Baker (D)	Duke W. Dunbar (R)	Homer Bedford (D)	21D, 14R	38D, 27R	Gordon Allott (R)	John A. Carroll (D)	2D, 2R	Eisenhower/ Nixon (R) ✓
1959	Stephen McNichols (D)	Robert Lee Knous (D)	George Baker (D)	Duke W. Dunbar (R)	Tim Armstrong (D)	22D, 13R	44D, 21R	Gordon Allott (R)	John A. Carroll (D)	3D, 1R	Eisenhower/ Nixon (R) ✓
1960	Stephen McNichols (D)	Robert Lee Knous (D)	George Baker (D)	Duke W. Dunbar (R)	Tim Armstrong (D)	22D, 13R	44D, 21R	Gordon Allott (R)	John A. Carroll (D)	3D, 1R	Nixon/ Lodge (R) ✗
1961	Stephen McNichols (D)	Robert Lee Knous (D)	George Baker (D)	Duke W. Dunbar (R)	Tim Armstrong (D)	19D, 16R	33D, 32R	Gordon Allott (R)	John A. Carroll (D)	2D, 2R	Nixon/ Lodge (R) ✗
1962	Stephen McNichols (D)	Robert Lee Knous (D)	George Baker (D)	Duke W. Dunbar (R)	Tim Armstrong (D)	19D, 16R	33D, 32R	Gordon Allott (R)	John A. Carroll (D)	2D, 2R	Nixon/ Lodge (R) ✗
1963	John Arthur Love (R) (Note: Resigned to become director of the Office of Energy Policy.)	Robert Lee Knous (D)	Bryon A. Anderson (R)	Duke W. Dunbar (R)	Homer Bedford (D)	20R, 15D	41R, 24D	Gordon Allott (R)	Peter H. Dominick (R)	2D, 2R	Nixon/ Lodge (R) ✗
1964	John Arthur Love (R)	Robert Lee Knous (D)	Bryon A. Anderson (R)	Duke W. Dunbar (R)	Homer Bedford (D)	20R, 15D	41R, 24D	Gordon Allott (R)	Peter H. Dominick (R)	2D, 2R	Johnson/ Humphrey (D) ✓
1965	John Arthur Love (R)	Robert Lee Knous (D)	Bryon A. Anderson (R)	Duke W. Dunbar (R)	Homer Bedford (D)	20R, 15D	42D, 23R	Gordon Allott (R)	Peter H. Dominick (R)	4D	Johnson/ Humphrey (D) ✓
1966	John Arthur Love (R)	Robert Lee Knous (D)	Bryon A. Anderson (R)	Duke W. Dunbar (R)	Homer Bedford (D)	20R, 15D	42D, 23R	Gordon Allott (R)	Peter H. Dominick (R)	4D	Johnson/ Humphrey (D) ✓
1967	John Arthur Love (R)	Mark Anthony Hogan (D)	Bryon A. Anderson (R)	Duke W. Dunbar (R)	Virginia Neal Blue (R)	20R, 15D	37R, 28D	Gordon Allott (R)	Peter H. Dominick (R)	3D, 1R	Johnson/ Humphrey (D) ✓
1968	John Arthur Love (R)	Mark Anthony Hogan (D)	Bryon A. Anderson (R)	Duke W. Dunbar (R)	Virginia Neal Blue (R)	20R, 15D	37R, 28D	Gordon Allott (R)	Peter H. Dominick (R)	3D, 1R	Nixon/ Agnew (R) ✓
1969	John Arthur Love (R)	Mark Anthony Hogan (D)	Bryon A. Anderson (R)	Duke W. Dunbar (R)	Virginia Neal Blue (R)	24R, 11D	38R, 27D	Gordon Allott (R)	Peter H. Dominick (R)	3D, 1R	Nixon/ Agnew (R) ✓
1970	John Arthur Love (R)	Mark Anthony Hogan (D)	Bryon A. Anderson (R)	Duke W. Dunbar (R)	Virginia Neal Blue (R)	24R, 11D	38R, 27D	Gordon Allott (R)	Peter H. Dominick (R)	3D, 1R	Nixon/ Agnew (R) ✓
1970	John Arthur Love (R)	Mark Anthony Hogan (D)	Bryon A. Anderson (R)	Duke W. Dunbar (R)	Julia Swearingen (R)	24R, 11D	38R, 27D	Gordon Allott (R)	Peter H. Dominick (R)	3D, 1R	Nixon/ Agnew (R) ✓
1971	John Arthur Love (R)	John D. Vanderhoof (R)	Bryon A. Anderson (R)	Duke W. Dunbar (R)	Palmer Burch (R)	21R, 14D	38R, 27D	Gordon Allott (R)	Peter H. Dominick (R)	2D, 2R	Nixon/ Agnew (R) ✓
1972	John Arthur Love (R)	John D. Vanderhoof (R)	Bryon A. Anderson (R)	Duke W. Dunbar (R)	Palmer Burch (R)	21R, 14D	38R, 27D	Gordon Allott (R)	Peter H. Dominick (R)	2D, 2R	Nixon/ Agnew (R) ✓
1973	John Arthur Love (R)	John D. Vanderhoof (R)	Bryon A. Anderson (R)	Duke W. Dunbar (R)	Palmer Burch (R)	22R, 13D	37R, 28D	Floyd Haskell (D)	Peter H. Dominick (R)	3R, 2D	Nixon/ Agnew (R) ✓
1973	John D. Vanderhoof (R)	Ted L. Strickland (R)	Bryon A. Anderson (R)	John P. Moore (R)	Palmer Burch (R)	22R, 13D	37R, 28D	Floyd Haskell (D)	Peter H. Dominick (R)	3R, 2D	Nixon/ Agnew (R) ✓
1974	John D. Vanderhoof (R)	Ted L. Strickland (R)	Mary Estill Buchanan (R)	John P. Moore (R)	Palmer Burch (R)	22R, 13D	37R, 28D	Floyd Haskell (D)	Peter H. Dominick (R)	3R, 2D	Nixon/ Agnew (R) ✓
1975	Richard Lamm (D)	George L. Brown (D)	Mary Estill Buchanan (R)	J.D. MacFarlane (D)	Sam Brown (D)	19R, 16D	39D, 26R	Floyd Haskell (D)	Gary Hart (D)	3D, 2R	Nixon/ Agnew (R) ✓
1976	Richard Lamm (D)	George L. Brown (D)	Mary Estill Buchanan (R)	J.D. MacFarlane (D)	Sam Brown (D)	19R, 16D	39D, 26R	Floyd Haskell (D)	Gary Hart (D)	3D, 2R	Ford/ Dole (R) ✗
1977	Richard Lamm (D)	George L. Brown (D)	Mary Estill Buchanan (R)	J.D. MacFarlane (D)	Roy Romer (D)	18R, 17D	35R, 30D	Floyd Haskell (D)	Gary Hart (D)	3D, 2R	Ford/ Dole (R) ✗
1978	Richard Lamm (D)	George L. Brown (D)	Mary Estill Buchanan (R)	J.D. MacFarlane (D)	Roy Romer (D)	18R, 17D	35R, 30D	Floyd Haskell (D)	Gary Hart (D)	3D, 2R	Ford/ Dole (R) ✗
1979	Richard Lamm (D)	Nancy Dick (D)	Mary Estill Buchanan (R)	J.D. MacFarlane (D)	Roy Romer (D)	22R, 13D	38R, 27D	William L. Armstrong (R)	Gary Hart (D)	3D, 2R	Ford/ Dole (R) ✗
1980	Richard Lamm (D)	Nancy Dick (D)	Mary Estill Buchanan (R)	J.D. MacFarlane (D)	Roy Romer (D)	22R, 13D	38R, 27D	William L. Armstrong (R)	Gary Hart (D)	3D, 2R	Reagan/ Bush (R) ✓
1981	Richard Lamm (D)	Nancy Dick (D)	Mary Estill Buchanan (R)	J.D. MacFarlane (D)	Roy Romer (D)	22R, 13D	39R, 26D	William L. Armstrong (R)	Gary Hart (D)	3D, 2R	Reagan/ Bush (R) ✓
1982	Richard Lamm (D)	Nancy Dick (D)	Mary Estill Buchanan (R)	J.D. MacFarlane (D)	Roy Romer (D)	22R, 13D	39R, 26D	William L. Armstrong (R)	Gary Hart (D)	3D, 2R	Reagan/ Bush (R) ✓
1983	Richard Lamm (D)	Nancy Dick (D)	Natalie Meyer (R)	Duane Woodard (R)	Roy Romer (D)	22R, 13D	40R, 25D	William L. Armstrong (R)	Gary Hart (D)	3D, 3R	Reagan/ Bush (R) ✓
1984	Richard Lamm (D)	Nancy Dick (D)	Natalie Meyer (R)	Duane Woodard (R)	Roy Romer (D)	22R, 13D	40R, 25D	William L. Armstrong (R)	Gary Hart (D)	3D, 3R	Reagan/ Bush (R) ✓
1985	Richard Lamm (D)	Nancy Dick (D)	Natalie Meyer (R)	Duane Woodard (R)	Roy Romer (D)	24R, 11D	48R, 17D	William L. Armstrong (R)	Gary Hart (D)	4R, 2D	Reagan/ Bush (R) ✓
1986	Richard Lamm (D)	Nancy Dick (D)	Natalie Meyer (R)	Duane Woodard (R)	Roy Romer (D)	24R, 11D	48R, 17D	William L. Armstrong (R)	Gary Hart (D)	4R, 2D	Reagan/ Bush (R) ✓
1987	Roy Romer (D)	Mike Callihan (D)	Natalie Meyer (R)	Duane Woodard (D) (Note: Entered office as a Republican but by 1990 had switched parties and become a Democrat.)	Gail Schoettler (D)	25R, 10D	41R, 24D	William L. Armstrong (R)	Tim Wirth (D)	3R, 3D	Reagan/ Bush (R) ✓
1988	Roy Romer (D)	Mike Callihan (D)	Natalie Meyer (R)	Duane Woodard (D)	Gail Schoettler (D)	25R, 10D	41R, 24D	William L. Armstrong (R)	Tim Wirth (D)	3R, 3D	Bush/ Quayle (R) ✓
1989	Roy Romer (D)	Mike Callihan (D)	Natalie Meyer (R)	Duane Woodard (D)	Gail Schoettler (D)	24R, 11D	40R, 25D	William L. Armstrong (R)	Tim Wirth (D)	3R, 3D	Bush/ Quayle (R) ✓
1990	Roy Romer (D)	Mike Callihan (D)	Natalie Meyer (R)	Duane Woodard (D)	Gail Schoettler (D)	24R, 11D	40R, 25D	William L. Armstrong (R)	Tim Wirth (D)	3R, 3D	Bush/ Quayle (R) ✓
1991	Roy Romer (D)	Mike Callihan (D)	Natalie Meyer (R)	Gale Norton (R)	Gail Schoettler (D)	23R, 12D	38R, 27D	Hank Brown (R)	Tim Wirth (D)	3R, 3D	Bush/ Quayle (R) ✓
1992	Roy Romer (D)	Mike Callihan (D)	Natalie Meyer (R)	Gale Norton (R)	Gail Schoettler (D)	23R, 12D	38R, 27D	Hank Brown (R)	Tim Wirth (D)	3R, 3D	Clinton/ Gore (D) ✓
1993	Roy Romer (D)	Mike Callihan (D)	Natalie Meyer (R)	Gale Norton (R)	Gail Schoettler (D)	19R, 16D	34R, 31D	Hank Brown (R)	Ben Nighthorse; Campbell (D)	4R, 2D	Clinton/ Gore (D) ✓
1994	Roy Romer (D)	Samuel H. Cassidy (D)	Natalie Meyer (R)	Gale Norton (R)	Gail Schoettler (D)	19R, 16D	34R, 31D	Hank Brown (R)	Ben Nighthorse; Campbell (D)	4R, 2D	Clinton/ Gore (D) ✓
1995	Roy Romer (D)	Gail Schoettler (D)	Victoria Buckley (R) (Note: Died in office on July 17, 1999.)	Gale Norton (R)	Bill Owens (R)	19R, 16D	41R, 24D	Hank Brown (R)	Ben Nighthorse; Campbell (R)	4R, 2D	Clinton/ Gore (D) ✓
1996	Roy Romer (D)	Gail Schoettler (D)	Victoria Buckley (R)	Gale Norton (R)	Bill Owens (R)	19R, 16D	41R, 24D	Hank Brown (R)	Ben Nighthorse; Campbell (R)	4R, 2D	Dole/ Kemp (R) ✗
1997	Roy Romer (D)	Gail Schoettler (D)	Victoria Buckley (R)	Gale Norton (R)	Bill Owens (R)	20R, 15D	41R, 24D	Wayne Allard (R)	Ben Nighthorse; Campbell (R)	4R, 2D	Dole/ Kemp (R) ✗
1998	Roy Romer (D)	Gail Schoettler (D)	Victoria Buckley (R)	Gale Norton (R)	Bill Owens (R)	20R, 15D	41R, 24D	Wayne Allard (R)	Ben Nighthorse; Campbell (R)	4R, 2D	Dole/ Kemp (R) ✗
1999	Bill Owens (R)	Joe Rogers (R)	Victoria Buckley (R)	Ken Salazar (D)	Mike Coffman (R)	21R, 14D	39R, 26D	Wayne Allard (R)	Ben Nighthorse; Campbell (R)	4R, 2D	Dole/ Kemp (R) ✗
1999	Bill Owens (R)	Joe Rogers (R)	Donetta Davidson (R) (Note: Initially appointed to fill vacancy; later elected in their own right.)	Ken Salazar (D)	Mike Coffman (R)	21R, 14D	39R, 26D	Wayne Allard (R)	Ben Nighthorse; Campbell (R)	4R, 2D	Dole/ Kemp (R) ✗
2000	Bill Owens (R)	Joe Rogers (R)	Donetta Davidson (R)	Ken Salazar (D)	Mike Coffman (R)	21R, 14D	39R, 26D	Wayne Allard (R)	Ben Nighthorse; Campbell (R)	4R, 2D	Bush/ Cheney (R) ✓
2001	Bill Owens (R)	Joe Rogers (R)	Donetta Davidson (R)	Ken Salazar (D)	Mike Coffman (R)	18D, 17R	38R, 27D	Wayne Allard (R)	Ben Nighthorse; Campbell (R)	4R, 2D	Bush/ Cheney (R) ✓
2002	Bill Owens (R)	Joe Rogers (R)	Donetta Davidson (R)	Ken Salazar (D)	Mike Coffman (R)	18D, 17R	38R, 27D	Wayne Allard (R)	Ben Nighthorse; Campbell (R)	4R, 2D	Bush/ Cheney (R) ✓
2003	Bill Owens (R)	Jane Norton (R)	Donetta Davidson (R)	Ken Salazar (D)	Mike Coffman (R)	18R, 17D	37R, 28D	Wayne Allard (R)	Ben Nighthorse; Campbell (R)	5R, 2D	Bush/ Cheney (R) ✓
2004	Bill Owens (R)	Jane Norton (R)	Donetta Davidson (R)	Ken Salazar (D)	Mike Coffman (R)	18R, 17D	37R, 28D	Wayne Allard (R)	Ben Nighthorse; Campbell (R)	5R, 2D	Bush/ Cheney (R) ✓
2005	Bill Owens (R)	Jane Norton (R)	Donetta Davidson (R)	John Suthers (R)	Mike Coffman (R)	18D, 17R	35D, 30R	Wayne Allard (R)	Ken Salazar (D) (Note: Resigned following appointment as United States Secretary of the Interior.)	4R, 3D	Bush/ Cheney (R) ✓
2005	Bill Owens (R)	Jane Norton (R)	Gigi Dennis (R) (Note: Appointed to fill a vacancy.)	John Suthers (R)	Mark Hillman (R)	18D, 17R	35D, 30R	Wayne Allard (R)	Ken Salazar (D)	4R, 3D	Bush/ Cheney (R) ✓
2006	Bill Owens (R)	Jane Norton (R)	Gigi Dennis (R)	John Suthers (R)	Mark Hillman (R)	18D, 17R	35D, 30R	Wayne Allard (R)	Ken Salazar (D)	4R, 3D	Bush/ Cheney (R) ✓
2006	Bill Owens (R)	Jane Norton (R)	Gigi Dennis (R)	John Suthers (R)	Mike Coffman (R) (Note: Resigned in 2005 in order to re-join the United States Marine Corps, with whom he then served tour-of-duty in Iraq. Upon Coffman's resignation as treasurer, Governor Bill Owens appointed State Senator Mark Hillman to the office. Hillman served as treasurer until 2006, when Coffman returned from Iraq and was able to fulfill the duties of the office.)	18D, 17R	35D, 30R	Wayne Allard (R)	Ken Salazar (D)	4R, 3D	Bush/ Cheney (R) ✓
2007	Bill Ritter (D)	Barbara O'Brien (D)	Mike Coffman (R) (Note: Elected in November 2008 to U.S. House representing Colorado's 6th congressional district.)	John Suthers (R)	Cary Kennedy (D)	20D, 15R	39D, 26R	Wayne Allard (R)	Ken Salazar (D)	4D, 3R	Bush/ Cheney (R) ✓
2008	Bill Ritter (D)	Barbara O'Brien (D)	Mike Coffman (R)	John Suthers (R)	Cary Kennedy (D)	20D, 15R	39D, 26R	Wayne Allard (R)	Ken Salazar (D)	4D, 3R	Obama/ Biden (D) ✓
2009	Bill Ritter (D)	Barbara O'Brien (D)	Bernie Buescher (D)	John Suthers (R)	Cary Kennedy (D)	21D, 14R	38D, 27R	Mark Udall (D)	Michael Bennet (D)	5D, 2R	Obama/ Biden (D) ✓
2010	Bill Ritter (D)	Barbara O'Brien (D)	Bernie Buescher (D)	John Suthers (R)	Cary Kennedy (D)	21D, 14R	38D, 27R	Mark Udall (D)	Michael Bennet (D)	5D, 2R	Obama/ Biden (D) ✓
2011	John Hickenlooper (D)	Joseph Garcia (D)	Scott Gessler (R)	John Suthers (R)	Walker Stapleton (R)	20D, 15R	33R, 32D	Mark Udall (D)	Michael Bennet (D)	4R, 3D	Obama/ Biden (D) ✓
2012	John Hickenlooper (D)	Joseph Garcia (D)	Scott Gessler (R)	John Suthers (R)	Walker Stapleton (R)	20D, 15R	33R, 32D	Mark Udall (D)	Michael Bennet (D)	4R, 3D	Obama/ Biden (D) ✓
2013	John Hickenlooper (D)	Joseph Garcia (D)	Scott Gessler (R)	John Suthers (R)	Walker Stapleton (R)	20D, 15R	37D, 28R	Mark Udall (D)	Michael Bennet (D)	4R, 3D	Obama/ Biden (D) ✓
2014	John Hickenlooper (D)	Joseph Garcia (D)	Scott Gessler (R)	John Suthers (R)	Walker Stapleton (R)	18D, 17R (Note: Democrats Angela Giron (District 3) and John P. Morse (District 11) were recalled.)	37D, 28R	Mark Udall (D)	Michael Bennet (D)	4R, 3D	Obama/ Biden (D) ✓
2015	John Hickenlooper (D)	Joseph Garcia (D)	Wayne W. Williams (R)	Cynthia Coffman (R)	Walker Stapleton (R)	18R, 17D	34D, 31R	Cory Gardner (R)	Michael Bennet (D)	4R, 3D	Obama/ Biden (D) ✓
2016	John Hickenlooper (D)	Joseph Garcia (D)	Wayne W. Williams (R)	Cynthia Coffman (R)	Walker Stapleton (R)	18R, 17D	34D, 31R	Cory Gardner (R)	Michael Bennet (D)	4R, 3D	Clinton/ Kaine (D) ✗
2016	John Hickenlooper (D)	Donna Lynne (D)	Wayne W. Williams (R)	Cynthia Coffman (R)	Walker Stapleton (R)	18R, 17D	34D, 31R	Cory Gardner (R)	Michael Bennet (D)	4R, 3D	Clinton/ Kaine (D) ✗
2017	John Hickenlooper (D)	Donna Lynne (D)	Wayne W. Williams (R)	Cynthia Coffman (R)	Walker Stapleton (R)	18R, 17D	37D, 28R	Cory Gardner (R)	Michael Bennet (D)	4R, 3D	Clinton/ Kaine (D) ✗
2018	John Hickenlooper (D)	Donna Lynne (D)	Wayne W. Williams (R)	Cynthia Coffman (R)	Walker Stapleton (R)	18R, 17D	37D, 28R	Cory Gardner (R)	Michael Bennet (D)	4R, 3D	Clinton/ Kaine (D) ✗
2019	Jared Polis (D)	Dianne Primavera (D)	Jena Griswold (D)	Phil Weiser (D)	Dave Young (D)	19D, 16R	41D, 24R	Cory Gardner (R)	Michael Bennet (D)	4D, 3R	Clinton/ Kaine (D) ✗
2020	Jared Polis (D)	Dianne Primavera (D)	Jena Griswold (D)	Phil Weiser (D)	Dave Young (D)	19D, 16R	41D, 24R	Cory Gardner (R)	Michael Bennet (D)	4D, 3R	Biden/ Harris (D) ✓
2021	Jared Polis (D)	Dianne Primavera (D)	Jena Griswold (D)	Phil Weiser (D)	Dave Young (D)	20D, 15R	41D, 24R	John Hickenlooper (D)	Michael Bennet (D)	4D, 3R	Biden/ Harris (D) ✓
2022	Jared Polis (D)	Dianne Primavera (D)	Jena Griswold (D)	Phil Weiser (D)	Dave Young (D)	21D, 14R (Note: State Sen. Kevin Priola (D-Henderson District 25) left the Republican Party to register as a Democrat on August 22, 2022.)	41D, 24R	John Hickenlooper (D)	Michael Bennet (D)	4D, 3R	Biden/ Harris (D) ✓
2023	Jared Polis (D)	Dianne Primavera (D)	Jena Griswold (D)	Phil Weiser (D)	Dave Young (D)	23D, 12R	46D, 19R	John Hickenlooper (D)	Michael Bennet (D)	5D, 3R	Biden/ Harris (D) ✓
2024	Jared Polis (D)	Dianne Primavera (D)	Jena Griswold (D)	Phil Weiser (D)	Dave Young (D)	23D, 12R	46D, 19R	John Hickenlooper (D)	Michael Bennet (D)	5D, 3R	Harris/ Walz (D) ✗
2025	Jared Polis (D)	Dianne Primavera (D)	Jena Griswold (D)	Phil Weiser (D)	Dave Young (D)	23D, 12R	43D, 22R	John Hickenlooper (D)	Michael Bennet (D)	4D, 4R	Harris/ Walz (D) ✗
2026	Jared Polis (D)	Dianne Primavera (D)	Jena Griswold (D)	Phil Weiser (D)	Dave Young (D)	23D, 12R	43D, 22R	John Hickenlooper (D)	Michael Bennet (D)	4D, 4R	Harris/ Walz (D) ✗
2027	Phil Weiser (D)	Lesley Dahlkemper (D)	Amanda Gonzalez (D)	Jena Griswold (D)	Jeff Bridges (D)	24D, 11R	49D, 16R	John Hickenlooper (D)	Michael Bennet (D)	7D, 1R	Harris/ Walz (D) ✗

Key to party colors and abbreviations for members of the U.S. Congress and other politicians or officials
Alaskan Independence (AKIP) Know Nothing (KN) American Labor (AL) Anti-Jacksonian (Anti-J); National Republican (NR) Anti-Administration (AA) Anti-Masonic (Anti-M) Conservative (Con) Covenant (Cov)	Democratic (D) Democratic–Farmer–Labor (DFL) Democratic–NPL (D-NPL) Dixiecrat (Dix), States' Rights (SR) Democratic-Republican (DR) Farmer–Labor (FL) Federalist (F); Pro-Administration (PA)	Free Soil (FS) Fusion (Fus) Greenback (GB) Independence (IPM) Jacksonian (J) Liberal (Lib) Libertarian (L) National Union (NU)	Nonpartisan League (NPL) Nullifier (N) Opposition Northern (O); Opposition Southern (O) Populist (Pop) Progressive (Prog) Prohibition (Proh) Readjuster (Rea)	Republican (R) Silver (Sv) Silver Republican (SvR) Socialist (Soc) Union (U) Unconditional Union (UU) Vermont Progressive (VP) Whig (W)	Independent (I) Nonpartisan (NP)

== See also ==
- Elections in Colorado
- Politics of Colorado
  - Colorado Democratic Party
  - Colorado Republican Party
- Government of Colorado
