= Attorney General Ireland =

Attorney General Ireland may refer to:

- Gail L. Ireland (1895–1988), Attorney General of Colorado
- Richard Davies Ireland (1816–1877), Attorney-General of Victoria

== See also ==
- Attorney General of Ireland, the modern office
- Attorney-General for Ireland, the pre-independence office
