= 2002 Colorado Attorney General election =

- November 5, 2002
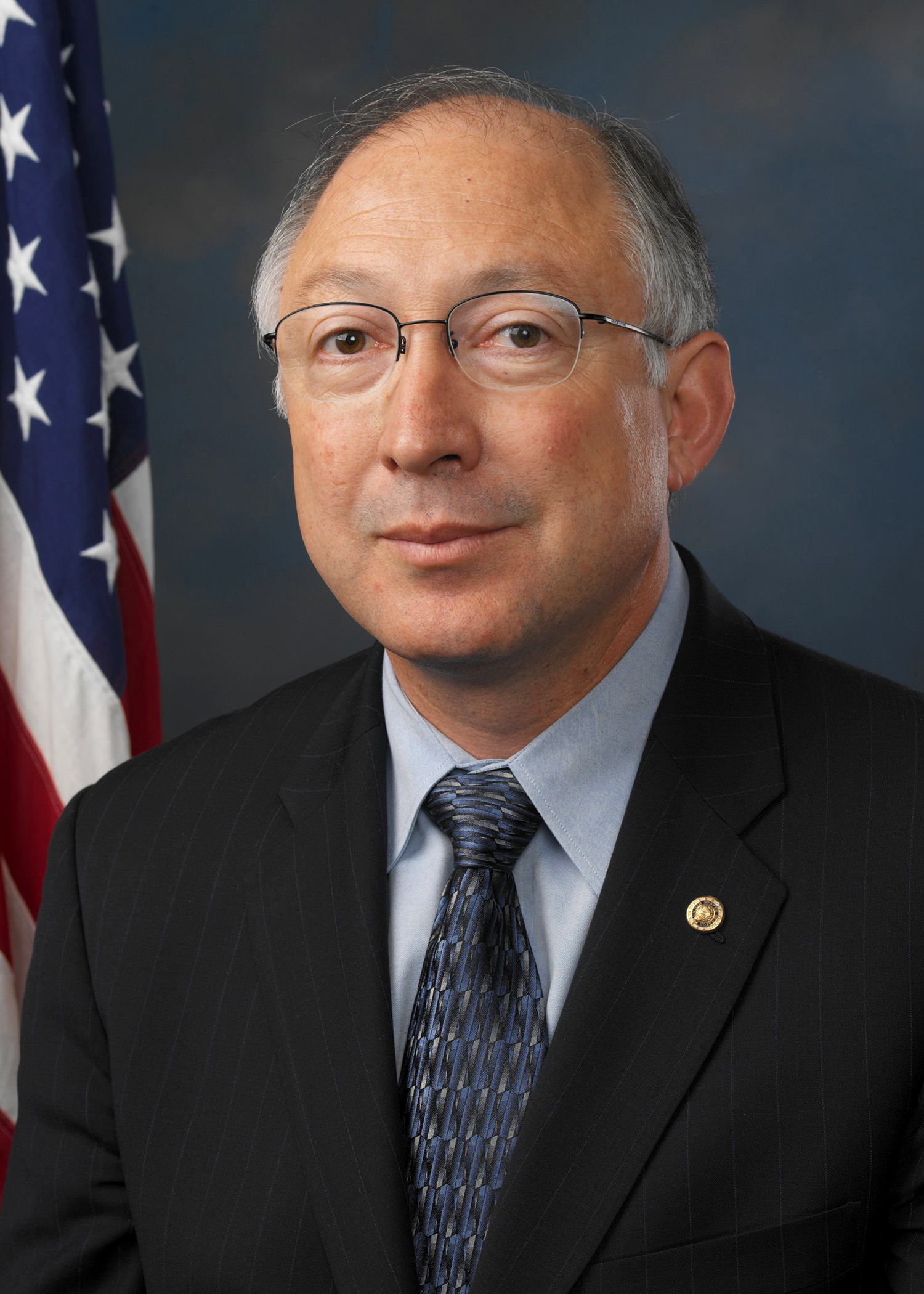

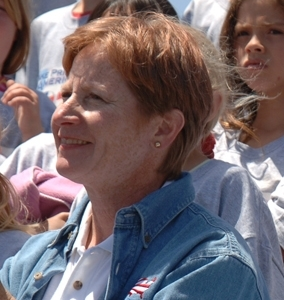
Nominee	Ken Salazar	Marti Allbright
Party	Democratic	Republican
Popular vote	803,200	522,281
Percentage	57.92%	37.66%
- County results Salazar: 40–50% 50–60% 60–70% 70–80% 80–90% Allbright: 40–50% 50–60%
Attorney General before election
Ken Salazar
Democratic
Elected Attorney General
Ken Salazar
Democratic

The 2002 Colorado Attorney General election was held on November 5, 2002, to elect the Colorado Attorney General. Democratic incumbent Ken Salazar won re-election to a second term in a landslide, defeating Republican former Chief Deputy Colorado Attorney General Marti Allbright by twenty percentage points.

== Democratic primary ==
=== Nominee ===
- Ken Salazar, incumbent Colorado Attorney General (1999–2005)

=== Results ===
Democratic primary results
Party	Candidate	Votes	%
Democratic	Ken Salazar	108,849	100.00%
Total votes		108,849	100.00%

== Republican primary ==
=== Nominee ===
- Marti Allbright, former Chief Deputy Colorado Attorney General (1997–1999)

=== Results ===
Republican primary results
Party	Candidate	Votes	%
Republican	Marti Allbright	176,629	100.00%
Total votes		176,629	100.00%

== General election ==
=== Candidates ===
- Ken Salazar, incumbent Colorado Attorney General (1999–2005) (Democratic)
- Marti Allbright, former Chief Deputy Colorado Attorney General (1997–1999) (Republican)
- Alison Maynard (Green)
- Dwight K. Harding (Libertarian)

=== Results ===
2002 Colorado Attorney General election results
Party	Candidate	Votes	%	±%
Democratic	Ken Salazar	803,200	57.92%	+7.96%
Republican	Marti Allbright	522,281	37.66%	−9.75%
Green	Alison Maynard	35,301	2.55%	N/A
Libertarian	Dwight K. Harding	26,023	1.88%	−0.76%
Total votes		1,386,805	100.00%	
Democratic hold				
