= H. Lawrence Hinkley =

American politician

29th Attorney General of Colorado
- In office January 9, 1945 – January 11, 1949
- Governor: John Charles Vivian; William Lee Knous
- Preceded by: Gail L. Ireland
- Succeeded by: John W. Metzger

Personal details
- Born: May 16, 1896; Sterling, Colorado
- Died: June 2, 1962 (aged 66); Boulder, Colorado
- Political party: Republican

H. Lawrence Hinkley (May 16, 1896 – June 2, 1962) was an American politician who served as the Attorney General of Colorado from 1945 to 1949.
