= J.D. MacFarlane =

American politician (1933–2023)

33rd Attorney General of Colorado
- In office January 14, 1975 – January 11, 1983
- Governor: Richard Lamm
- Preceded by: John P. Moore
- Succeeded by: Duane Woodard

Personal details
- Born: John Dee MacFarlane; October 4, 1933 Pueblo, Colorado, U.S.
- Died: February 16, 2023 (aged 89) Denver, Colorado, U.S.
- Party: Democratic
- Spouse: Janet
- Children: 3
- Education: Harvard University (BA); Stanford Law School (JD)
- Profession: Attorney

John Dee "J.D." MacFarlane (October 4, 1933 – February 16, 2023) was an American politician who served as the Attorney General of Colorado from 1975 to 1983. He previously served in the Colorado House of Representatives from 1965 to 1969 and in the Colorado Senate from the 4th district from 1969 to 1973.

== Early life and career ==
John Dee MacFarlane was born October 4, 1933, and raised in Pueblo, Colorado. He attended Harvard University on a scholarship and graduated with a degree in government in 1955. He spent four years in the Air Force, two as a private first class in the United States Air Force, and two as a civilian advisor to the Chief of Staff at the Pentagon. He attended Stanford Law School and graduated in 1962.

== Political career ==
He was elected to the Colorado House of Representatives in 1964 and served two terms. In 1968 he was elected to the Colorado Senate. While in the House he served, at various times, as a member of the Committee on Appropriations; the Committee on State Affairs; and the Committee on Labor & Employment Relations. During his first term in the House, House Joint Resolution Number 1024 created a Committee on State and Local Taxes, on which MacFarlane served as chair of the subcommittee on income taxation. In the Senate, he served on the Committees on Game Fish & Parks; Judiciary; Local Government; Transportation; and Urban Affairs, respectively.

He ran for Colorado Attorney General in 1970, losing to Duke W. Dunbar. He won election to be Attorney General in 1974. He opted not to run for reelection in the 1982 general election.

He died on February 16, 2023, in Denver, Colorado at age 89.
