= Duane Woodard =

American politician (born 1938)

34th Attorney General of Colorado
- In office January 11, 1983 – January 8, 1991
- Governor: Richard Lamm; Roy Romer
- Preceded by: J.D. MacFarlane
- Succeeded by: Gale Norton

Member of the Colorado Senate from the 29th district
- In office January 12, 1977 – March 1980
- Preceded by: Hank Brown
- Succeeded by: Roy Shore

Personal details
- Born: January 12, 1938 (age 88) Kansas City, Missouri, U.S.
- Party: Democratic (since 1987); Republican (before 1987)
- Education: University of Wyoming (BA); University of Oklahoma (JD)
- Profession: Attorney; Politician

Military service
- Allegiance: United States
- Branch/service: (United States Marine Corps) Marine Corps

L. Duane Woodard (born January 12, 1938) is an American politician who served as the Attorney General of Colorado from 1983 to 1991. He previously served in the Colorado Senate from the 29th district from 1977 to 1980.

== Early life and career ==
L. Duane Woodard was born in Kansas City, Missouri on January 12, 1938. A military brat, he was raised in Greeley, Colorado, Cheyenne, Wyoming, and Casper, Wyoming. Woodard joined the United States Marine Corps serving in Japan and the Philippines. He was honorably discharged in 1959. He then attended the University of Wyoming and the University of Oklahoma College of Law. After his studies, he took a position at the Sinclair Oil Corporation. Two years later, he moved to Fort Collins to become a Deputy District Attorney for the Eighth Judicial District. In 1974, he became a municipal judge in Windsor.

== Political career ==
He was elected to the Colorado Senate in the 1976 general election. In March 1980, Governor Richard Lamm appointed Woodard to the Colorado Public Utilities Commission. Fellow Republican Roy Henry Shore succeeded Woodard in the Senate for a brief time before his own appointment to the University of Colorado Board of Regents. In 1982, Woodard defeated Democratic candidate Gail Klapper. In 1987, Woodard switched from the Republican Party to Democratic Party citing the party's advocacy for austerity and personal conflicts with its members. In the 1988 general election, Woodard headed Colorado Unity, one of two groups organized to oppose an English-only amendment to the Colorado Constitution. Republican candidate Gale Norton defeated Woodard in the 1990 general election. While Attorney General, he chaired the National Association of Attorneys General's Environmental Control Committee.

== Post-political career ==
Woodard later served as General Counsel to his predecessor in the State Senate, Republican U.S. Senator Hank Brown.
