= Duke W. Dunbar =

American politician

31st Attorney General of Colorado
- In office January 9, 1951 – December 8, 1972
- Governor: Daniel I. J. Thornton; Edwin C. Johnson; Stephen McNichols; John Arthur Love
- Preceded by: John W. Metzger
- Succeeded by: John P. Moore

Personal details
- Born: September 3, 1894; Mount Sterling, Illinois
- Died: December 8, 1972 (aged 78); Denver, Colorado
- Political party: Republican

Duke W. Dunbar (September 3, 1894 – December 8, 1972) was an American politician who served as the Attorney General of Colorado from 1951 to 1972.

He died of a stroke on December 8, 1972, in Denver, Colorado at age 78.
