= Gale Norton =

U.S. politician and former Secretary of the Interior (born 1954)

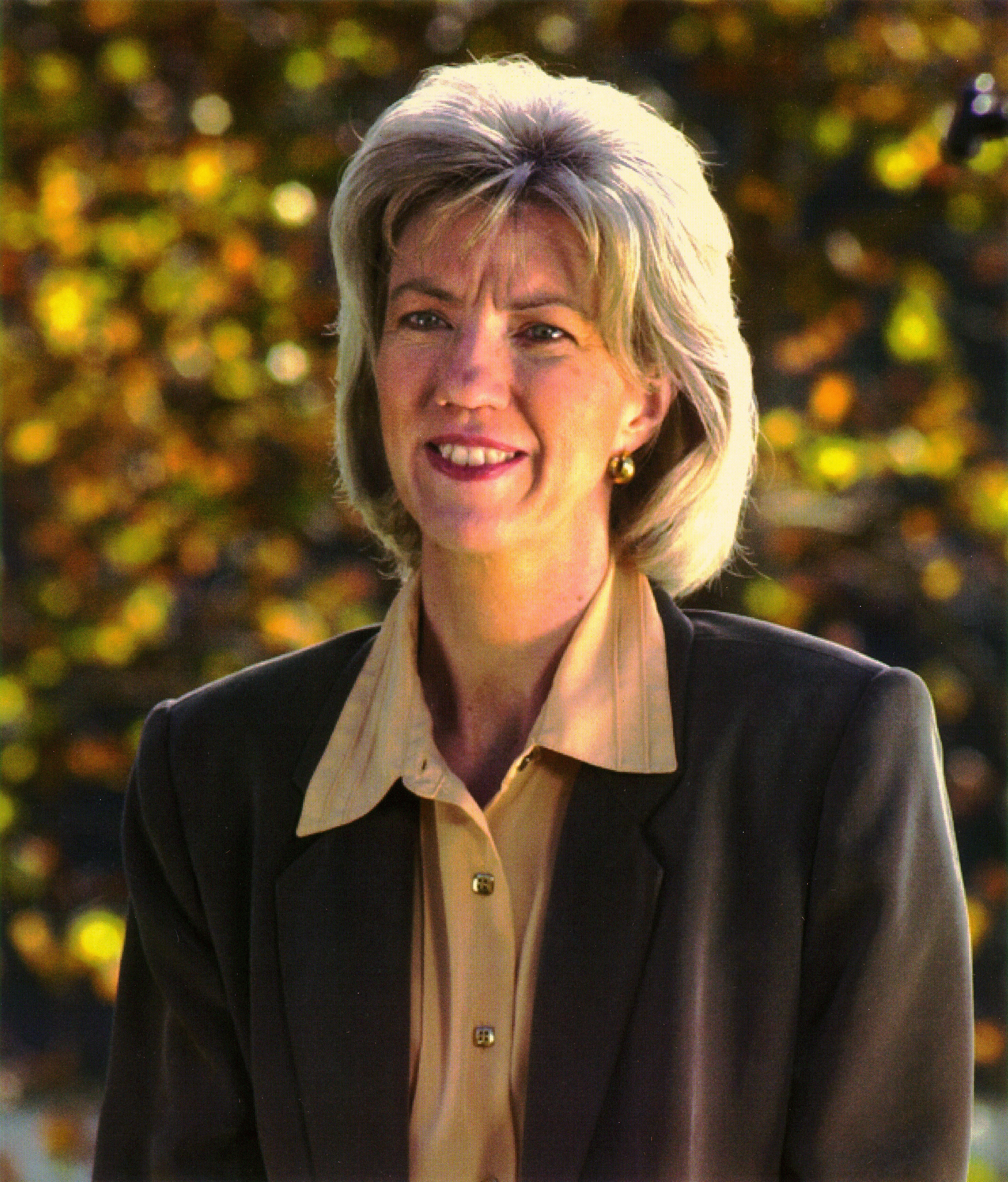
- Norton in 2001

48th United States Secretary of the Interior
- In office January 31, 2001 – March 31, 2006
- President: George W. Bush
- Preceded by: Bruce Babbitt
- Succeeded by: Dirk Kempthorne

35th Attorney General of Colorado
- In office January 8, 1991 – January 12, 1999
- Governor: Roy Romer
- Preceded by: Duane Woodard
- Succeeded by: Ken Salazar

Personal details
- Born: March 11, 1954 (age 72) Wichita, Kansas, U.S.
- Party: Libertarian (before 1980s); Republican (1980s–present)
- Education: University of Denver (BA, JD)

Gale Ann Norton (born March 11, 1954) is an American politician and attorney who served as the 48th United States Secretary of the Interior under President George W. Bush from 2001 to 2006. A member of the Republican Party, she previously served as the 35th Attorney General of Colorado from 1991 to 1999. Norton was the first woman to hold each of those posts.

== Early life and education ==
Norton was born in Wichita, Kansas, to Dale and Anna Norton. She was raised in Wichita and Thornton, Colorado, and graduated magna cum laude and Phi Beta Kappa from the University of Denver in 1975. Norton earned her Juris Doctor degree with honors from that university's College of Law in 1978. In the late 1970s, she was a member of the Libertarian Party; she was nearly selected as its national director in 1980, before later becoming a Republican. Norton was influenced by the works of novelist Ayn Rand, and has been associated with a number of groups in the "wise use" or "free-market environmentalist" movement such as the Property and Environmental Research Center, of which she is a fellow.

== Career ==
Following her graduation from law school, Norton worked as a senior attorney at the Mountain States Legal Foundation from 1979 to 1983. Norton was a National Fellow at the Hoover Institution during 1983–1984, before taking a position at the U.S. Department of Agriculture as an assistant to Deputy Secretary Richard Edmund Lyng. From 1985 to 1990, she served as Associate Solicitor for the United States Department of the Interior, in which capacity she managed attorneys employed by the National Park Service and the United States Fish and Wildlife Service.

=== Colorado Attorney General ===
Norton returned to Colorado after her stint at the Department of the Interior, and was elected as the state's first female Attorney General in 1991. As Attorney General, Norton led the state's attorneys in defending state laws, including Colorado Amendment 2, a 1992 state constitutional amendment that prohibited any level or branch of state government from recognizing homosexuals as a protected class. Challenges to Amendment 2 reached the United States Supreme Court, which invalidated the amendment in Romer v. Evans (1996).

Norton ran for election to the U.S. Senate in 1996 as a Republican, but was defeated in the primary by then-U.S. Representative Wayne Allard. During that year, Norton delivered a controversial speech in which she remarked that while state sovereignty had been misused to defend slavery prior to and during the Civil War, with the end of the war, the United States "lost the idea that the states were to stand against the federal government having too much power over our lives".

With the attorneys general of 45 other states, Norton participated in the negotiation of the Tobacco Master Settlement Agreement (entered into in 1998) a settlement of Medicaid lawsuits by the states against U.S. tobacco companies for the recovery of public health costs attributed to the treatment of smoking-related illnesses. Norton's second term ended in 1999. Due to state term limits, she did not seek a third term.

After leaving the Attorney General's Office, Norton was a senior counsel at Brownstein, Hyatt & Farber, a Denver-based law firm.

=== U.S. Secretary of the Interior ===
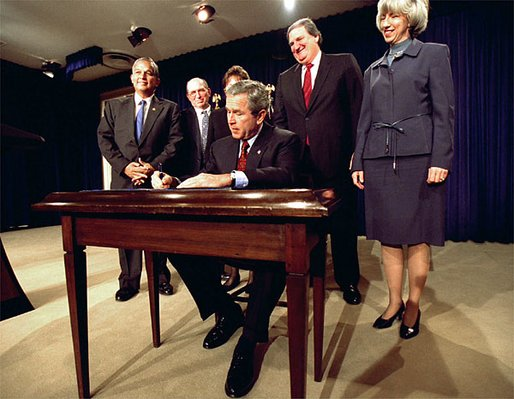
Gale Norton stands by President George W. Bush and other dignitaries at the signing ceremony of a conservation bill in 2002.

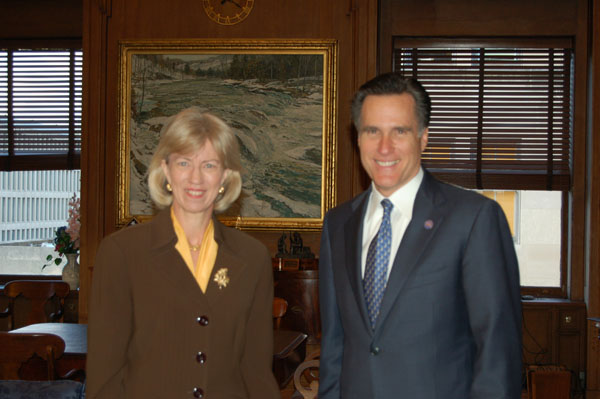
Norton with Governor Mitt Romney of Massachusetts in 2005

She worked at Brownstein until President George W. Bush nominated her as the U.S. Secretary of the Interior in 2001. Norton, the first female to hold the position, was confirmed by the Senate and served as Secretary until 2006. She was succeeded by Idaho Governor Dirk Kempthorne during the second term of the administration of George W. Bush.

On January 29, 2002, she served as the designated survivor during President Bush's first State of the Union Address.

On September 17, 2009, the United States Department of Justice opened a criminal investigation into whether Norton's employment at Royal Dutch Shell violated a law that bars federal employees from discussing employment with a company if the employee is involved in decisions that could benefit that company. The investigation focused on a 2006 decision by Norton's agency to grant oil shale leases to Royal Dutch Shell. The DOJ closed the investigation in 2010, declining to press charges.

=== Post-government career ===
At the time of her resignation as Secretary, Norton was considered "the Bush administration's leading advocate for expanding oil and gas drilling and other industrial interests in the West." After leaving Washington, she joined Royal Dutch Shell as a general counsel in its exploration and production business.

As of 2017, Norton worked for Norton Regulatory Strategies, an Aurora-based consulting firm that deals with environmental regulations. In 2012, she also was a senior adviser for Clean Range Ventures, an energy venture capital firm. She serves as a board member for the Federalist Society, the Reagan Alumni Association, the Renewable and Sustainable Energy Institute at the University of Colorado.

== Electoral history ==
- 1996 United States Senate Republican Primary (Colorado)
  - Wayne Allard (R), 57%
  - Gale Norton (R), 43%

== Personal life ==
Norton lives in Colorado with John Hughes, her second husband.

== See also ==
- List of female state attorneys general in the United States
- List of female United States Cabinet members

Legal offices
Preceded by Duane Woodard	Attorney General of Colorado; 1991–1999	Succeeded by Ken Salazar
Political offices
Preceded by Bruce Babbitt	United States Secretary of the Interior; 2001–2006	Succeeded by Dirk Kempthorne
U.S. order of precedence (ceremonial)
Preceded by Elaine Chao as Former U.S. Cabinet Member	Order of precedence of the United States as Former U.S. Cabinet Member	Succeeded by John Ashcroft as Former U.S. Cabinet Member
