= Eugene Engley =

American politician 1851–1910)

9th Attorney General of Colorado
- In office 1893–1894
- Preceded by: Joseph H. Maupin
- Succeeded by: Byron L. Carr

Personal details
- Born: Eugene D. Engley; April 5, 1851 Attleboro, Massachusetts, U.S.
- Died: April 18, 1910 (aged 59)
- Resting place: Alamosa Municipal Cemetery
- Party: People's
- Spouse: Hilda Jayne Gaines (m. 1881; died 1898)
- Occupation: Politician, attorney, political activist

Eugene D. Engley (April 5, 1851 – April 18, 1910) was an American attorney and political activist. Engley is best remembered as the 9th attorney general of the state of Colorado, holding that position as the elected candidate of the People's Party from 1893 to 1894. Engley was also a prominent figure in the Colorado Labor Wars of 1903–04 as an advocate for the striking miners affiliated with the Western Federation of Miners.

== Biography ==
=== Early years ===
Eugene D. Engley was born April 5, 1851, in Attleborough, Massachusetts, the son of James Henry Engley and his wife, the former Mary Kaley.

After attending public school in Massachusetts, Engley came west to Colorado in 1873, setting up residence in the southwestern corner of the state.

Engley married Hilda Jayne Gaines in Colorado Springs on April 4, 1881. His wife would die of uterine cancer in 1898, at the age of 43.

=== Career ===
Engley began his life in Colorado as a newspaper publisher, launching the first newspaper in La Plata County, The Southwest. Engley later moved to Durango, Colorado, where he published a newspaper called The Daily Republican. In 1882 Engley was chosen as the city attorney of Durango.

Engley moved to the town of Antonito, Colorado, where he served intermittently as county attorney of Conejos County from 1884 to 1891. Engley was made the city attorney of Antonito in 1891.

In 1892 Engley became active in the People's Party (so-called "Populists"). In 1893 Engley was elected Colorado Attorney General on the People's Party ticket, defeating both Republican and Democratic opponents. He would remain in that position until the expiration of his term of office in 1894.

As was the case with many populists following the fusion of the People's Party with the Democratic Party during the Presidential campaign of William Jennings Bryan in 1896, Engley moved into the emerging socialist movement in subsequent years. Engley was instrumental in writing the first two platforms of the Socialist Party of Colorado following the establishment of the Socialist Party of America in 1901.

During the first decade of the 20th Century Engley worked as a lawyer in the Cripple Creek, Colorado, a mining district beset by labor strife. Engley supported the cause of the Western Federation of Miners during the Cripple Creek Strike of 1903-04, organizing meetings in streets and halls in support of the miners, at which he denounced the actions of the mine-owners' association and the Colorado Citizens' Alliance. This made Engley persona non grata with the political establishment of Teller County, Colorado, which governed during the strike under the blanket of martial law.

During the evening of August 20, 1904, Engley and several other prominent community leaders in sympathy with the miners were detained by armed men on horseback and physically deported from Cripple Creek. Engley was taken by armed guards to the neighboring town of Florissant and placed on a train to Denver.

Engley refused to submit, however, and returned several days later to Cripple Creek armed with a rifle, with which he marched along the town's streets, making his return known. Thereafter Engley remained unmolested, albeit fully armed at all times, until the end of the bitter and violent labor dispute and the martial law that accompanied it.

In the years after the strike Engley's law practice was subjected to a boycott by many citizens of the community, resulting in its loss of economic viability.

=== Death and legacy ===
A few years before his death Engley moved from Cripple Creek to Alamosa, Colorado, where he lived in retirement from the legal profession, reading and writing on social and economic issues of the day.

Eugene Engley died of pneumonia on April 18, 1910. He was 59 years old at the time of his death. Engley's body was interred at Alamosa Municipal Cemetery.

== Works ==
- No Mistake Possible: Attorney Gen. Engley's Opinion on the Ballot Question. Denver, CO: n.p., [1893].

Legal offices
Preceded by Joseph H. Maupin	Attorney General of Colorado; 1893–1894	Succeeded by Byron L. Carr
