= A. J. Sampson =

American diplomat, lawyer and politician

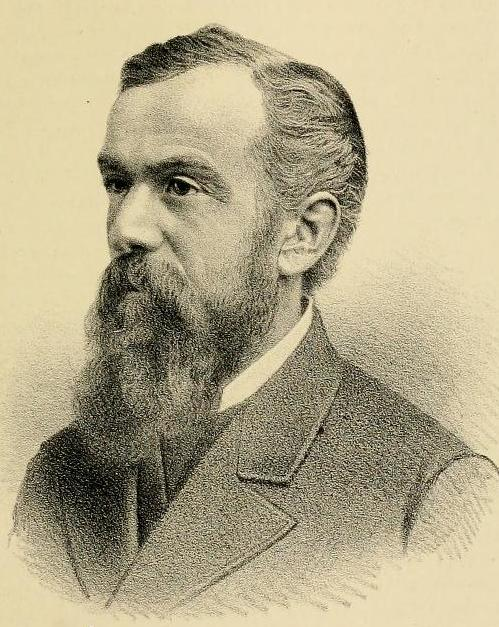

United States Ambassador to Ecuador
- In office December 16, 1897 – July 15, 1905
- Appointed by: William McKinley
- Preceded by: James D. Tillman
- Succeeded by: Joseph W. J. Lee

1st Attorney General of Colorado
- In office November 3, 1876 – January 14, 1879
- Governor: John Long Routt
- Preceded by: Office established
- Succeeded by: Charles W. Wright

Personal details
- Born: Archibald Johnson Sampson; June 21, 1839 Cadiz, Ohio, U.S.
- Died: December 24, 1921 (aged 82) Phoenix, Arizona, U.S.
- Party: Republican

Military service
- Allegiance: United States
- Branch/service: United States Army
- Years of service: 1861–1865
- Rank: Captain
- Unit: 27th U.S.C.T.

Archibald Johnson Sampson (June 21, 1839 – December 24, 1921) was an American diplomat, lawyer and politician. Sampson played an important role in the early legal development of the State of Colorado and served as a U.S. Envoy Extraordinary and Minister Plenipotentiary to Ecuador for over 7 years.

== Early life, education and military service ==
Archibald Johnson "A. J." Sampson was born on April 6, 1817, in Cadiz, Ohio. His parents, who were of Irish-Welsh descent, owned a farm near Cadiz. In his youth, A. J. Sampson spend much of his time helping on the farm. His early education was a log school house, but later he attended the New Hagerstown Academy. His family became relatively wealthy, which allowed him to pursue a college education. He graduated from Mount Union College on his 22nd birthday in 1861, just two months after the American Civil War had broken out.

Shortly after graduating college, Sampson enlisted as a Private in Company C of the 43rd Ohio Infantry. While serving with this regiment, he was promoted to the rank of Sergeant. He was relieved from the service due to an injury in 1862 and served one year as superintendent of schools in Uhrichsville, Ohio. He relisted with the Union Army and later rose to the rank of First Lieutenant. Sampson, a white officer, served with the 27th United States Colored Infantry Regiment, whose enlisted man were African American volunteers. In 1864, the Regiment was assigned to the Army of the Potomac, with Sampson in command of Commando H.

Sampson's unit participated in the Battle of the Crater on July 30, 1864 during the Siege of Petersburg. The U.S.C.T. regiments under the command of Brig. Gen. Edward Ferrero were leading the assault and suffered strong losses in a Confederate victory. The assault ended in a debacle for the Union troops, which ended up trapped in the crater they had blasted with a mine in the Confederate line of defense. Lt. Gen. Ulysses S. Grant, who was in command of all Union forces, called the battle "the saddest affair I have witnessed in this war." The siege of Petersburg lasted another 7 months and ended in a Union victory. Sampson sent a letter containing his eyewitness account of the battle to the Tuscarawas Advocate, which published it on August 9, 1864. He defended the reputation of the African-American men serving under his command, which he called "heroes", while also describing the carnage that was caused by the battle.

Patriots shed tears while viewing the field (...). I do not believe the failure was on account of colored troops, but ask anyone who was in the charge. No heroes ever fought more valiantly than many colored men did that day. This is acknowledged by all. Our dead number about 300, wounded and prisoner I know not how many but both are heavy.

— Archibald J. Sampson, Tuscarawas Advocate (August 9, 1864)

During the war, Sampson studied law while he served at the front lines. In November 1864, an illness ended his service with the 27th U.S.C.T. Sampson wanted to continue his service for the Union Army and asked Mayor General Silas Casey in a letter for an appointment to his staff in Washington, DC. Sampson was not appointed to Casey's staff and instead received an honorable discharge on February 4, 1865. After returning from his war service, Sampson passed the bar exam and was admitted to the Ohio Bar. He later attended Cleveland Law School, from which he graduated in 1865. In 1867, Sampson was granted a brevet promotion to the rank of Captain.

== Pioneer in Missouri ==
In 1866, Sampson moved to Missouri, where he settled in Sedalia. He opened a law practice there, which was later joined by his younger brother Francis A. Sampson. A. J. Sampson was a fixture of the social life in Sedalia and hosted parties that found mention in the local newspaper.

In addition, he was involved in local politics although he did not run for any elected office. Although he served as the county superintendent of public schools in Pettis County in 1869. In 1872, Sampson declined a nomination for Missouri General Assembly in the Pettis County district. In a meeting of Sedalia citizens, Sampson argued for the establishment of a "seminary", in this context a secular institution of higher education, that educates both female and male students equally. He disapproved of single-sex education, arguing that if men and women life their lives together, they also should be educated together.

On March 23, 1873, President Ulysses S. Grant nominated Archibald J. Sampson of Missouri to be United States Consul to Palestine in Jerusalem. Sampson declined the appointment and Frank S. De Haas was appointed in his place.

== Pioneer in Colorado ==
In 1873, A. J. Sampson moved to Canon City in the Colorado Territory. In Canon City, Sampson continued to practice law and was involved in local Republican politics.

=== Attorney General ===
The Republican State convention was held on August 23, 1876 in Pueblo. William H. Van Gieson, who later served as a Regent of the University of Colorado, nominated A. J. Sampson for the office of Colorado Attorney General. This nomination was seconded by William H. Meyer, who moved that Sampson be declared the nominee by acclamation. The only other candidate, A. C. Phelps of Denver, withdrew his candidacy and Sampson was nominated by unanimous consent.

In the general election, Sampson ran against the Democratic nominee G. Q. Richmond. He won the election by a 14,145 to 13,182 margin. After his election as Colorado Attorney General, Sampson moved to Denver, the state's capital.

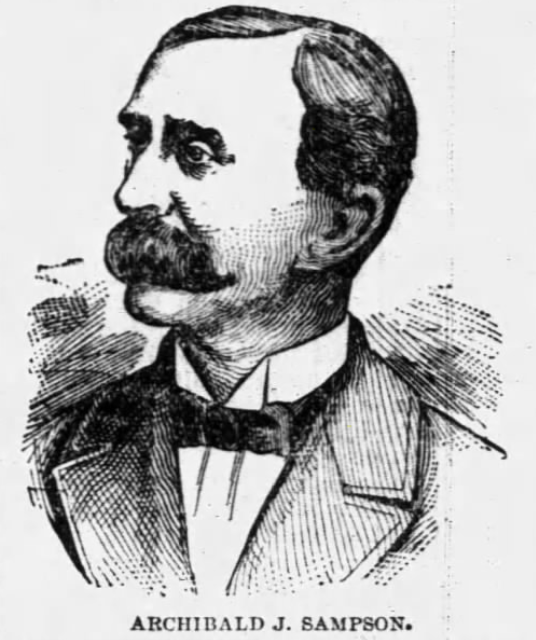
Archibald J. Sampson, 1890s

Serving as Colorado's first Attorney General, Sampson discovered many inconsistencies in the young state's new laws. In his biennial report of 1878, he wrote: "I have found the laws inadequate for the purposes intended, in many instances, or sections of one act in conflict with those of another." Colorado state law at the time prevented Sampson from making suggestions for those laws to Colorado General Assembly.

== Diplomatic service ==
=== United States Consul at Paso del Norte, Mexico ===
A. J. Sampson was nominated to the office of United States Consul in Paso del Norte (now Ciudad Juarez) by President Benjamin Harrison on July 22, 1889, during a recess of the U.S. Senate. His recess appointment was confirmed by the Senate on December 16, 1889. Sampson arrived in Ciudad Juarez on August 29, 1889 and was at first refused recognition by the city's mayor, because his exequatur had not yet arrived from Mexico City. There was some speculation whether the background of the snub was an alleged statement by Sampson in which he opposed the import of Mexican lead ore. Sampson denied that he ever made such a statement. He was finally recognized by the Mexican government on October 1, 1889.

During a visit to Fort Worth, Texas in September 1890, Sampson describing his relationship with his Mexican hosts as very positive. He said: "The Mexicans are a pleasant people to live and do business with, and I have never approached their officials on matters of business without receiving courteous treatment and securing immediate attention to the matter in hand." He also expressed hope that trade between the United States and Mexico would grow further to the benefit of both countries.

During August 1893, Sampson was replaced as Consul by Theodore Huston, who died in office just 14 months later. A. J. Sampson returned to the United States in September 1893 after his diplomatic service in Mexico had ended. Instead of moving back to Colorado, he decided to move to Phoenix, which was at the time the capital of the Arizona Territory. He once again practiced law in his new home. Sampson also owned a ranch and invested in mining operations in the Salt River Valley. During his time in Mexico, Sampson learned to read and speak Spanish. In Phoenix, he served as the president of the local chapter of the Chamber of Commerce.

=== United States Minister to Ecuador ===
On September 20, 1897, President William McKinley appointed A. J. Sampson as Envoy Extraordinary and Minister Plenipotentiary to Ecuador. His appointment was considered unusual, as Sampson was a resident of a territory and not a state. Sampson was the first resident of territory appointed to an ambassadorship since Lewis Cass had been sent to France in 1836. Observers concluded that McKinley's motivation for the appointment was his close relationship with Sampson. Sampson's nomination was confirmed by the United States Senate on December 18, 1897.

== Later life and recognition ==
In the fall of 1921, A. J. Sampson contracted pneumonia on a journey from his summer home near Austinburg, Ohio to Phoenix. Sampson had to interrupt his journey in Chicago for several days until his state improved and he was able to undertake further travel. Sampson arrived in November 1921 in a bad state of health. His wife died shortly after his arrival. After briefly recovering, Sampson's health deteriorated again and he died in his Phoenix home on December 24, 1921.

A. J. Sampson was recognized as an extraordinary public speaker. William McKinley used him as a campaign surrogate during the 1896 Presidential election. Sampson hold campaign events for McKinley across the country. After the election, President McKinley appointed Sampson to the ambassadorship in Ecuador. During a visit to that country in 1928, President Herbert Hoover recognized Sampson's service in the country in a public speech.

Party political offices
Preceded by Office established	Attorney General of Colorado; 1876–1879	Succeeded by Charles W. Wright
