= Paul P. Prosser =

American politician (1880–1936)

26th Attorney General of Colorado
- In office January 10, 1933 – June 26, 1936
- Governor: Edwin C. Johnson
- Preceded by: Clarence L. Ireland
- Succeeded by: Byron G. Rogers

Personal details
- Born: November 7, 1880 Fayette, Missouri
- Died: June 26, 1936 (aged 55) Denver, Colorado
- Party: Democratic

Paul P. Prosser (November 7, 1880 – June 26, 1936) was an American politician who served as the Attorney General of Colorado from 1933 to 1936.

He died on June 26, 1936, in Denver, Colorado at age 55.
