= Colorado Attorney General =

Chief legal officer of the U.S. state of Colorado

Attorney General of Colorado
- Seal of Colorado

- Flag of Colorado

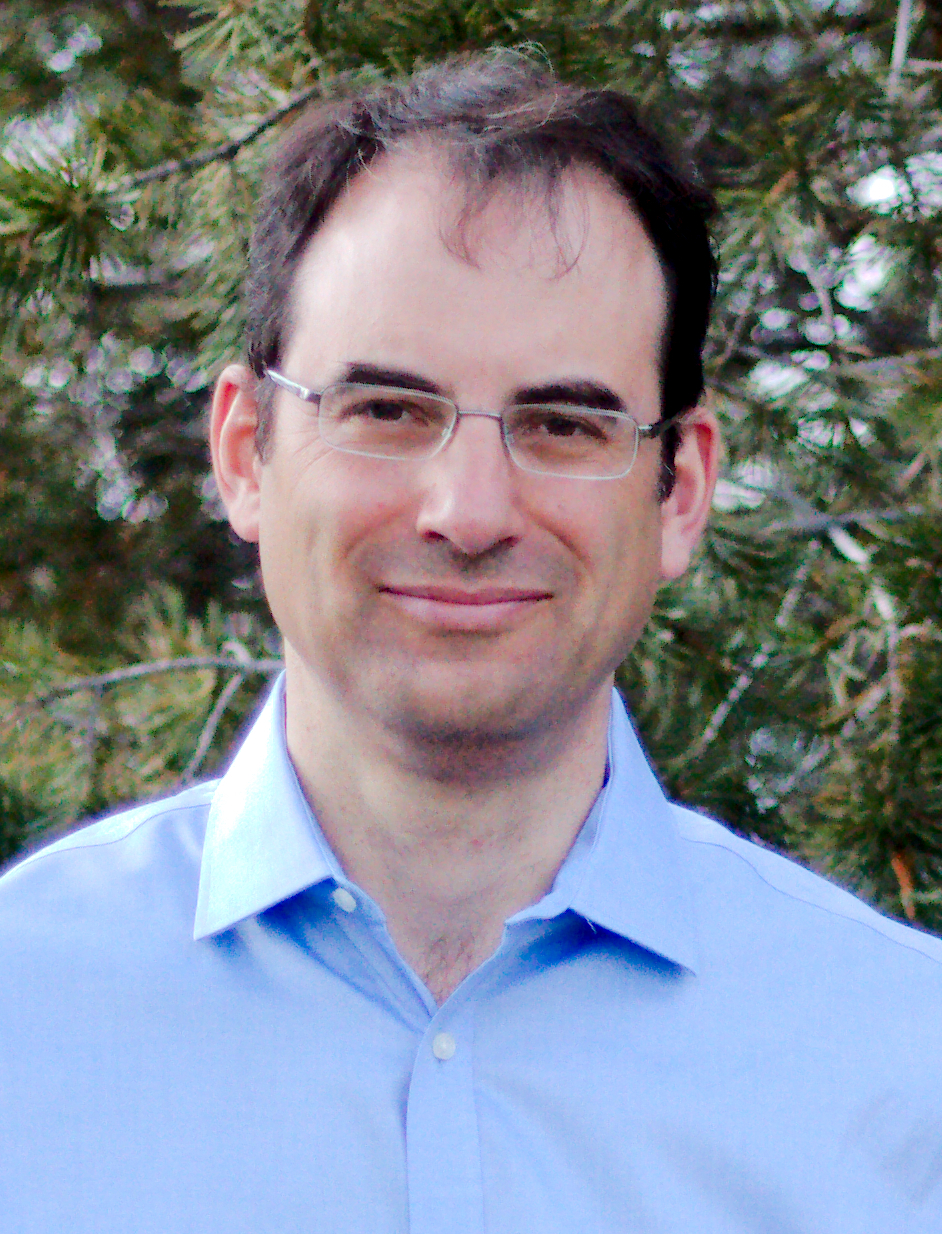
- Incumbent; Phil Weiser since January 8, 2019
- Colorado Department of Law
- Style: The Honorable
- Type: Statewide elected executive
- Abbreviation: AG
- Member of: Colorado executive department; State Claims Board
- Seat: Ralph L. Carr Colorado Judicial Center, Denver
- Appointer: Popular vote; Vacancies filled by the governor with the consent of the Colorado Senate
- Term length: Four years; Two consecutive terms
- Constituting instrument: Colorado Constitution Article IV; Colorado Revised Statutes Title 24, Article 31
- Inaugural holder: A. J. Sampson (state)
- Formation: 1861 (territorial); 1876 (state)
- Deputy: Chief deputy attorney general; solicitor general
- Salary: US$117,677 (2026)
- Website: coag.gov

The attorney general of Colorado is the chief legal officer of the U.S. state of Colorado and the head of the Colorado Department of Law, a principal department of the Colorado state government. The office is established by Article IV of the Colorado Constitution. The attorney general is elected statewide to a four-year term on the same cycle as the governor of Colorado and is limited to two consecutive terms. The incumbent is Democrat Phil Weiser, who has served since January 8, 2019. Weiser was re-elected in 2022 and is term-limited in 2027. He is the Democratic nominee for governor in 2026. The next attorney general election is November 3, 2026.

The attorney general and the Department of Law together are known as the Colorado Attorney General's Office. The office is the legal counsel to the executive and judicial branches and to the state auditor, enforces consumer protection and antitrust laws, prosecutes criminal appeals and some complex white-collar crimes, administers Peace Officer Standards and Training (POST), and represents the state in civil and appellate litigation. The office is in the Ralph L. Carr Colorado Judicial Center at 1300 Broadway in Denver.

== Powers and duties ==
Most of the attorney general's powers are statutory. Under Colorado Revised Statutes section 24-31-101, the attorney general is the chief legal representative of the state and the legal counsel and advisor of each department, division, office, board, commission, bureau, and agency of state government. The office does not provide legal counsel to the legislative branch except for the state auditor. Since 1973, legal services for state agencies have been provided centrally through the Department of Law. Agencies are billed under rates set in the annual Long Bill, as described below.

The attorney general:

- appears for the state and prosecutes and defends civil and criminal actions in which the state is a party or is interested when required to do so by the governor;
- prosecutes and defends causes in the appellate courts in which the state is a party or is interested;
- issues written legal opinions to the General Assembly, the governor, the lieutenant governor, the secretary of state, the state treasurer, the executive director of the Department of Revenue, and the commissioner of education;
- may independently initiate civil and criminal actions to enforce specified state laws, including the Colorado Consumer Protection Act, state antitrust law, the Unfair Practices Act, fair housing provisions, Medicaid fraud statutes, wage and employment-security laws (subject to statutory coordination with the Department of Labor and Employment), and several housing and tenant-protection statutes;
- may appoint deputy and assistant attorneys general and, at sole discretion, special assistant attorneys general except as limited by the exclusive-counsel rules in Colorado Revised Statutes section 24-31-111.

The office also has original or primary authority over enforcement of consumer protection and antitrust laws, prosecution of criminal appeals and some complex white-collar crimes, the statewide grand jury, training and certification of peace officers, and certain natural-resource and environmental matters. It works concurrently with Colorado's 22 district attorneys and other law-enforcement agencies. The attorney general is the official custodian of certain settlement funds in cases in which the state is a party. The Department of Law does not provide legal services to private individuals except where statute authorizes public-facing work, primarily consumer and fraud complaints.

The constitution also assigns the attorney general a role in appointing members of judicial nominating commissions. By statute the attorney general is one of three members of the State Claims Board, with the state treasurer and the executive director of the Department of Personnel and Administration.

== Qualifications and election ==
Article IV, Section 4 of the Colorado Constitution requires the attorney general to be at least 25 years old, a licensed attorney of the Colorado Supreme Court in good standing, a citizen of the United States, and a Colorado resident for at least two years immediately before the election.

The attorney general is chosen at the statewide general election in federal midterm years (2018, 2022, 2026, and so on). The term is four years, beginning on the second Tuesday of January following the election. The 1990 Colorado Term Limits Amendment limits the attorney general, like the other statewide constitutional officers, to two consecutive terms. A former officeholder may run again after at least four years out of office. Serving at least one-half of a term as an appointed replacement counts as a full term for term-limit purposes.

The annual salary is set by statute and may not be increased or diminished during a term. The 2026 salary is $117,677. An Independent State Elected Official Pay Commission recommended $170,000 effective January 1, 2027, subject to inflation adjustments from 2028 through 2030.

=== Recent elections ===
In the 2018 Democratic primary Weiser defeated state representative Joe Salazar, 301,354 (50.40%) to 296,551 (49.60%). Weiser then defeated Republican George Brauchler in the general election. In 2022 Weiser defeated Republican John Kellner. Certified write-in candidate Stanley Thorne received 1,772 votes.

2018 Colorado Attorney General election
Party	Candidate	Votes	%
Democratic	Phil Weiser	1,285,464	51.58
Republican	George Brauchler	1,124,757	45.14
Libertarian	William F. Robinson III	81,733	3.28
Total votes		2,491,954	100.00
Democratic gain from Republican			

2022 Colorado Attorney General election
Party	Candidate	Votes	%
Democratic	Phil Weiser (incumbent)	1,349,133	54.70
Republican	John Kellner	1,060,866	43.01
Libertarian	William F. Robinson III	54,557	2.21
Independent	Stanley Thorne (write-in)	1,772	0.07
Total votes		2,466,328	100.00
Democratic hold			

Weiser is term-limited in 2027 and ran for governor instead of a third term as attorney general. The secretary of state certified the June 30, 2026, primary on July 24, 2026. A biennial HTML abstract had not been posted as of August 2026; candidate totals below follow Ballotpedia's certified figures. Secretary of State Jena Griswold won the Democratic nomination. Republican Michael Allen defeated David Willson. Griswold and Allen are the major-party nominees for the November 3, 2026, general election.

2026 Colorado Attorney General Democratic primary
Party	Candidate	Votes	%
Democratic	Jena Griswold	385,795	44.21
Democratic	David Seligman	172,834	19.81
Democratic	Michael Dougherty	170,271	19.51
Democratic	Hetal Doshi	143,669	16.47
Total votes		872,569	100.00

2026 Colorado Attorney General Republican primary
Party	Candidate	Votes	%
Republican	Michael Allen	287,522	59.89
Republican	David Willson	192,533	40.11
Total votes		480,055	100.00

== Vacancies ==
If the office becomes vacant, the governor nominates a successor with the consent of the Senate. The appointee holds office until a successor is elected and qualified. If the Senate is not in session, the governor may appoint someone to discharge the duties until the Senate meets. The attorney general is not in the gubernatorial line of succession in Colorado.

== Department of Law ==
The Department of Law is one of the 20 principal departments of the executive branch. The attorney general is its chief executive officer. For FY 2025-26 the Joint Budget Committee recorded an original appropriation of $152,427,568 and 666.8 full-time equivalent positions, later restated after supplementals as $151,902,969 with the same FTE count. The enacted FY 2026-27 Long Bill (H.B. 26-1410) appropriated $163,772,155. A majority of the budget is reappropriated funds, primarily the Legal Services Cash Fund paid by client agencies. The department's General Fund share of statewide operating appropriations is about 0.2 percent.

=== Legal services to state agencies ===
Before 1973, state agencies hired their own lawyers, which the Joint Budget Committee has said sometimes produced conflicting legal positions among agencies. In 1973 the state centralized agency counsel in the Attorney General's Office. Agencies are generally prohibited from retaining outside counsel except when the Department of Law cannot provide the work, in which case services are still provided under the office's supervision.

The Legal Services to State Agencies section is the department's largest budget block. In FY 2025-26 it was about $68.4 million, or 44.9 percent of the department's total appropriation, for an assumed 550,080 billed hours. Two classes of employees bill client agencies: attorneys and legal assistants. Each billing attorney and legal assistant is assumed to provide 1,800 hours of legal services a year. All attorneys bill at one uniform attorney rate. All legal assistants bill at one uniform legal-assistant rate. The "blended" legal rate is a weighted average of those two rates. It is the figure used to convert each agency's estimated hours into a Long Bill appropriation.

From 1973 through FY 2016-17 the department billed agencies each month for hours actually worked the prior month. Starting in FY 2017-18 the General Assembly switched to a common-policy model: each agency is appropriated hours equal to its three-year average of actual use, multiplied by the blended rate. The Department of Law then bills each client one-twelfth of that appropriation every month. The Joint Budget Committee has said the change gave the department more staffing certainty and reduced the use of higher-cost contract counsel at year-end, while making the actual year-to-year cost of representation less transparent. Payments are credited to the Legal Services Cash Fund created in Colorado Revised Statutes section 24-31-108(4).

The annual Long Bill footnote caps the rates the department may charge. For FY 2026-27 the General Assembly's intent is that hourly rates not exceed the following:

Legal services billing rates, FY 2026-27
Billing class	Maximum hourly rate
Attorney	$139.50
Legal assistant	$87.76
Blended rate (used for agency appropriations)	$132.50

The prior-year (FY 2025-26) caps were $146.05 for attorneys, $98.03 for legal assistants, and a blended rate of $138.82. Rates move each year with salary, benefit, and operating costs. Nine clients each used more than 18,000 hours in FY 2024-25, led by the Department of Regulatory Agencies (125,265 hours). The Department of Corrections billed 27,416 hours. Statewide actual hours that year were 556,174.

=== Seat ===
The department occupies the Ralph L. Carr Colorado Judicial Center at 1300 Broadway in Denver, which also houses the Colorado Supreme Court, the Colorado Court of Appeals, and related judicial offices. The Attorney General's Office has used floors 6 through 10 of the office tower.

In the early morning of January 2, 2024, Brandon Olsen broke into the building, took keys from a security guard at gunpoint, started fires on the seventh floor, and fired a gun through windows. He later called 911 and surrendered. Sprinklers ran for more than two hours. Judicial officials told lawmakers that repair costs could exceed $35 million, with substantial rebuilds of the fifth, sixth, and seventh floors and smoke circulated through the HVAC system. District Attorney John Walsh later described the repair cost as "many millions of dollars." Spokesman Lawrence Pacheco said Attorney General's Office staff worked remotely and from the State Services Building and that the office did not lose critical daily-work records. Authorities said the break-in did not appear related to threats against justices after the court's 2023 ruling on Donald Trump's primary-ballot eligibility.

The office tower partially reopened to the public on October 8, 2024, starting with floors 1 and 2. Full reconstruction was projected into 2025. Joint Budget Committee staff later noted ongoing Carr Center renovation, including furniture, targeted by January 1, 2027, and a possible leased-space budget amendment. Olsen pleaded guilty to arson in 2025 and was sentenced in December 2025 to eight years in prison. Prosecutors had asked for 14 years. He also agreed to pay restitution in an amount set by the court.

=== Leadership ===
As of 2026 the senior officers of the department include:

- Attorney General Phil Weiser
- Chief Deputy Attorney General Natalie Hanlon Leh, who oversees litigation and legal counsel to executive and judicial agencies and may act for the attorney general except as to duties the constitution assigns to the officeholder personally
- Solicitor General Shannon Stevenson, the state's chief appellate lawyer under the attorney general's supervision
- Associate Chief Deputy Attorney General Tanja Wheeler

Named section deputies in department press releases, section pages, and legislative hearings include Nathan Blake (Consumer Protection), Scott Steinbrecher (Natural Resources and Environment), Jennifer Sullivan (State Services), Lee Reichert (Revenue and Regulatory Law), Kurt Morrison (intergovernmental affairs), Michelle Brissette Miller (Civil Litigation and Employment Law), Janet Stansberry Drake (Criminal Justice), and Jillian Price (Criminal Appeals).

The attorney general also appoints deputy attorneys general who typically lead sections of the office. The Criminal Justice Section must be led by a deputy attorney general who is a licensed attorney with at least two years of experience as a trial or appellate prosecutor. Designated lawyers in the department, including the attorney general, chief deputy, solicitor general, and certain deputies and assistants, are peace officers under Colorado law.

=== Statutory components ===
Colorado Revised Statutes section 24-31-102 lists the following components of the department, plus any other division, office, or unit the attorney general or the General Assembly establishes:

- Office of the Attorney General
- Office of the Solicitor General
- Division of Consumer Protection
- Division of Criminal Justice
- Division of Civil Protections and Rights
- Administrator of the Uniform Consumer Credit Code
- Medicaid Fraud Control Unit
- Peace Officers Standards and Training Board
- Financial Empowerment Office
- Fair Housing Unit
- Worker and Employee Protection Unit

Related statutory programs housed in the department include Safe2Tell and the Colorado Domestic Violence Fatality Review Board.

=== Operational sections ===
The department delivers day-to-day legal work through operational units it calls sections (statute uses the word "divisions"). The Department of Law's FY 2025-26 strategic plan describes eight operational sections, each divided into units. The Office of the Solicitor General is a statutory office rather than one of those eight sections. It oversees appellate strategy and constitutional litigation under the attorney general.

==== Civil Litigation and Employment Law ====
The section defends state agencies, institutions of higher education, and employees in administrative, state, and federal court. It also prosecutes some civil-rights matters and advises the Office of Risk Management. Units and work groups identified on the office website and in hiring notices include:

- Tort Litigation Unit, which defends personal-injury, property-damage, and civil-rights damages suits and advises on Colorado Governmental Immunity Act coverage and indemnity.
- Workers' Compensation Unit, which represents state agencies and higher-education institutions in workers' compensation claims from filing through hearings and appeals, including fully contested claims, disability and medical-benefit disputes, penalty allegations, petitions to review, and subrogation. The unit also represents the Subsequent Injury Fund and the Major Medical Insurance Fund and advises Risk Management and the state's third-party claims administrator on liability and settlements.
- Employment Law Defense Unit and Employment Practices and Civil Rights Unit, which defend employment-discrimination, retaliation, and related claims.
- Client-agency units for Corrections, Transportation, and Public Safety, plus construction-claims and contract-dispute litigation and a cross-unit trial team for complex civil cases.

The section is the office that negotiates most settlements of lawsuits by state employees and that defends the Colorado Department of Corrections (CDOC) in prisoner civil-rights, disability, and wage cases. In November 2022 The Gazette reported that since 2019 the state had entered more than 80 employee settlement agreements totaling more than $4 million, each with a non-disclosure clause. The newspaper said the Attorney General's Office largely negotiates those agreements. Spokesman Lawrence Pacheco said department attorneys "discourage the use of non-disclosure or non-disparagement clauses" and that the Department of Law had not required such a clause in a separation agreement with its own employees under Weiser. Plaintiff-side lawyer Casey Leier told the paper the office "routinely not only encourages but requires" such clauses. Identified payments in that reporting included $15,000 to former department paralegal Tatyana Smith (a lawsuit settlement, Pacheco said, not a separation agreement) and $100,000 to a CDOC prison guard who alleged workplace harassment. A separate 2021 Denver Gazette report said the state paid $406,000 to settle claims by CDOC warden Angel Medina.

The workers' compensation unit's docket is high-volume contested litigation for the state as employer. Reliable sources do not quantify "excessive" workers' compensation litigation by the office as a finding. They describe the unit as handling fully contested claims through hearing and appeal as part of its assigned defense work. Named CDOC prisoner and employment defense outcomes are listed under Litigation, settlements, and public records.

==== Natural Resources and Environment ====
The section counsels the Department of Natural Resources on mining, energy, parks and wildlife, state lands, and water rights, and the Colorado Department of Public Health and Environment on air quality, water quality, radiation, and hazardous and solid waste. It also represents the State Natural Resource Trustees and the Colorado Energy Office. Work groups include:

- Water, including administration of decrees, Water Court litigation, ground-water control, Colorado Water Conservation Board in-stream appropriations, and interstate compact and original-jurisdiction cases on the Colorado, Rio Grande, Arkansas, and Platte systems.
- Federal and interstate water, including Colorado River work.
- Environmental enforcement and counsel to CDPHE and DNR program divisions.

==== State Services ====
The section represents eight of the 16 governor-led principal departments plus the five statewide elected officials, the judicial branch, the state auditor, the Public Utilities Commission, Human Services, Health Care Policy and Financing, Personnel and Administration, higher education, early childhood, and K-12 education. It reviews state contracts and advises on data privacy, cybersecurity, and CORA. Units include:

- Human Services Unit, which defends county child-abuse findings and prosecutes licensing actions against child-care and substance-use treatment providers.
- Labor Unit, which advises the Department of Labor and Employment, the Department of Personnel and Administration, and the Board of Assessment Appeals.
- Higher Education Unit and an education practice that litigates teacher-licensing matters and constitutional challenges to education statutes.
- Contracts and Procurement Unit, which reviews state contracts and amendments for fiscal-rule compliance.
- Public Officials Unit, which appears on federal-court filings for statewide officers.

==== Revenue and Regulatory Law ====
The office describes this as the largest section, with about 10 units serving more than 70 agencies and boards. Clients include the Department of Revenue, PUC trial staff, the Property Tax Administrator, statewide bankruptcy clients, the Department of Regulatory Agencies (professions, banking, civil rights, financial services, insurance, real estate, securities), the Department of Agriculture, the State Personnel Board, the Independent Ethics Commission, and related commissions.

==== Criminal Justice ====
The section assists local prosecutors on multi-jurisdictional cases, presents to the statewide grand jury, serves as special district attorney on request, and has original jurisdiction over securities, insurance, and election fraud. It also handles human trafficking, major drug trafficking, white-collar, and some environmental crimes. Units and programs include:

- Special Prosecutions Unit
- Insurance Fraud (Insurance Fraud Cash Fund)
- Securities investigations
- POST unit (see below)
- Colorado Domestic Violence Fatality Review Board
- Victims' rights work under Colorado Revised Statutes section 24-31-106

The section is also the state's lawyer for the Colorado Bureau of Investigation. In 2025, reporting on a CBI DNA-lab scandal noted that the Attorney General's Office declined comment on disclosure disputes, citing client confidentiality and pending litigation.

==== Community Engagement ====
Program areas listed in the FY 2025-26 strategic plan are outreach and engagement, consumer engagement and data services, Safe2Tell Colorado, opioid response, grants and partnerships, and youth mental-health initiatives. The division is budgeted under Administration.

==== Consumer Protection ====
The section enforces antitrust, unfair and deceptive trade practices, data privacy, consumer lending, debt collection, and related laws. Operational units and statutory components housed here include:

- Antitrust
- Consumer Fraud Unit
- Consumer Credit Unit / Uniform Consumer Credit Code administrator
- Medicaid Fraud, Abuse and Neglect Unit
- False Claims Unit
- Opioid Unit
- Fair Housing Unit
- Worker and Employee Protection Unit
- Financial Empowerment Office
- Patterns and Practices

In December 2025 the False Claims Unit announced its first Colorado False Claims Act settlement, $400,000 from Instawork over alleged worker misclassification and unpaid unemployment premiums.

==== Criminal Appeals ====
The section represents the state when defendants challenge felony convictions in Colorado appellate courts and in federal habeas corpus proceedings. The office has described a staff of about 34 attorneys and four administrative employees responding to appeals generated by hundreds of trial prosecutors statewide. Joint Budget Committee staff reported a growing brief backlog: 435 at the end of FY 2025 and 468 as of December 31, 2025.

=== Peace Officer Standards and Training ===
The Peace Officers Standards and Training Board is a statutory component of the department and is chaired by the attorney general. Operationally it is a unit of the Criminal Justice Section. POST sets certification and in-service training standards for Colorado peace officers, approves academies, issues and revokes certifications, and administers training grants. Staff are at the Carr Center, 9th floor.

== History ==
The office dates to the Colorado Territory. James E. Dalliba was the first territorial attorney general (1861-1862). From 1873 to 1877 the territorial government did not fund the position, and the United States Attorney performed the work. Colorado entered the Union in 1876. A. J. Sampson, elected October 3, 1876, became the first state attorney general in 1877, with a term that ran to January 1879.

Duke W. Dunbar held the office from 1951 to 1972, the longest tenure. After Dunbar's death, John Carbone Porfilio (then known as John P. Moore) served from 1972 to 1974 before his appointment to the federal bench. Duane Woodard was elected as a Republican and switched to the Democratic Party in 1987. Gale Norton (1991-1999) later became United States Secretary of the Interior. Ken Salazar (1999-2005) resigned after election to the United States Senate and later served as Interior secretary. Republicans John Suthers (2005-2015) and Cynthia Coffman (2015-2019) preceded Weiser, the first Democrat to hold the office in 15 years when he was sworn in in 2019.

== Litigation, settlements, and public records ==
The office files consumer-protection, antitrust, and other enforcement actions and often resolves them by settlement or consent judgment. Settlement money in those plaintiff-side cases is deposited in custodial accounts the attorney general administers. During Weiser's tenure the office joined multi-state consumer and public-health cases, including opioid, JUUL, and Google matters, and a 2021 patterns-and-practices investigation of the Aurora Police Department that produced a court-monitored consent decree. IntegrAssure, led by Jeff Schlanger, was named monitor in 2022. By April 2026 a monitor report found substantial compliance with 63 of 78 mandates. Spokesman Lawrence Pacheco said the decree has no fixed end until three years of compliance are shown. It also defends state agencies in employment, tort, and workers' compensation cases, defends felony convictions on appeal, and has litigated high-profile constitutional matters. Many criminal-appeal reversals rest on trial-court or local-prosecutor error that the Attorney General's Office is assigned to defend rather than to have tried.

=== State Claims Board ===
The attorney general sits on the State Claims Board created in Colorado Revised Statutes section 24-30-1508. The other members are the state treasurer and the executive director of the Department of Personnel and Administration. As of 2026 the members were Attorney General Phil Weiser, Treasurer Dave Young, and DPA executive director Jana Locke. The board meets regularly to oversee the management of the risk management fund under section 24-30-1510. Meetings are scheduled in March, June, September, and December and are held virtually. A notice of public hearing is posted one week before each meeting by the secretary of state, DPA, the treasurer's office, and the Attorney General's Office.

The DPA executive director is charged with the efficient operation of the fund. For Claims Board purposes the fund pays liability claims and related expenses brought against the state, its officials, or employees under the Colorado Governmental Immunity Act, or arising under federal law, that the state is legally obligated to pay or that are compromised or settled. The attorney general, or private counsel with the attorney general's concurrence, provides the legal defense. Claims of $100,000 or more, and settlements of federal-law claims, require action by the board. Those payments come from the Risk Management Fund, not from the attorney general's operating budget. The Department of Law's Civil Litigation and Employment Law section advises the Office of Risk Management and appears as counsel on many of the cases the board considers.

=== State Personnel Board ===
The Department of Law represents respondent state agencies in classified-employee appeals before the Colorado State Personnel Board, including termination, discipline, and claims under the State Employee Protection Act (the whistleblower statute, Colorado Revised Statutes article 24-50.5). Revenue and Regulatory Law also lists the Personnel Board among its client agencies. An employee who alleges retaliation for a protected disclosure may appeal to the board within 10 days. The board reports annually to the governor on whistleblower complaints, hearings, and actions taken.

In its report for fiscal year 2024-25 the board recorded 36 whistleblower complaints filed, four evidentiary hearings on such complaints, and zero initial decisions finding a whistleblower violation. The prior year it recorded 44 filings, three hearings, and one initial decision finding a violation. Many filings were dismissed voluntarily, after review, or for procedural reasons (jurisdiction, untimeliness, abandonment, or failure to follow board rules). Those counts are Board statistics, not a win-loss rate for the Attorney General's Office. Most published ALJ hearings in the same reports found no statutory violation.

Two publicly reported merits findings against respondent agencies during Weiser's tenure, with Department of Law lawyers as agency counsel, are as follows. In Maes v. Department of Transportation, an ALJ found that CDOT violated the Whistleblower Act and the Colorado Anti-Discrimination Act when it reverted Marcus Maes from a trial-period supervisor job after he was interviewed in a civil-rights investigation of alleged racist workplace conduct. The board affirmed. In June 2023 the Court of Appeals affirmed, holding that substantial evidence supported the finding that the interview was a substantial or motivating factor. The remedy included reinstatement, back pay, a housing stipend with interest, and attorney fees. In Mendias v. Department of Human Services (2023), an ALJ reversed a disciplinary demotion at the Colorado Mental Health Hospital in Pueblo after finding a Whistleblower Act violation and later awarded fees. The board's FY 2023-24 annual report lists that initial decision as the year's finding of a violation.

When the Department of Law is the employer it is the named respondent. In Turner v. Department of Law (SPB 2024B079(c), March 2025) an ALJ affirmed the disciplinary termination of a certified department employee. A related whistleblower complaint in the same matter was dismissed in December 2024 after an unopposed motion; the Civil Rights Division had issued a no-probable-cause opinion.

Final board orders may be reviewed by the Colorado Court of Appeals. In February 2026 a three-judge panel in Strumpf v. Department of Corrections held that the board abused its discretion by excluding a hearing transcript that a former CDOC budget director had prepared after following the board's own instructions. The Attorney General's Office appeared for the department and for the board. The Court of Appeals remanded for the board to reconsider with the transcripts. The court did not decide the underlying disability-accommodation claim. In April 2026 the Court of Appeals in Anderl v. Department of Human Services affirmed the board's denial of a hearing on a probationary employee's whistleblower and discrimination claims.

=== Defense of the Department of Corrections ===
A dedicated Corrections client unit in Civil Litigation and Employment Law defends CDOC and its employees in 42 U.S.C. § 1983 prisoner suits, Americans with Disabilities Act claims, and employment and wage cases. The office is almost always defense counsel for the agency, not the plaintiff. Earlier administrations resolved large CDOC matters on the same docket, including a 2014 $3 million settlement over the death of prisoner Christopher Lopez and a 2018 State Claims Board approval of Aragon v. Raemisch, under which CDOC committed $41 million over two years to hepatitis C treatment (program funding, not a class damages check) plus $175,000 in attorneys' fees.

In July 2019 Weiser's office announced a $170,000 settlement with transgender prisoner Lindsay Saunders-Velez. In 2024 Denver District Court approved Raven v. Polis, a consent decree providing about $2.1 million to a class of transgender women plus housing and health-care changes; Department of Law lawyers, including Weiser, were listed as CDOC counsel, and Weiser called the decree a model for other states. A federal jury in Brooks v. Colorado Department of Corrections awarded $3.5 million in 2022 on an ADA meal-accommodation claim. The Attorney General's Office later sought remittitur, which the district court denied. The state then applied the payment to Brooks's criminal restitution; the United States Court of Appeals for the Tenth Circuit held in 2026 that the judgment was satisfied.

In February 2026 Denver District Court held in Mortis v. Polis that CDOC's use of punishment, including isolation, to compel prison labor violated the state constitution's ban on involuntary servitude. The Department of Law defended the governor and CDOC. Weiser's spokesman said the office was reviewing the ruling. In December 2025 the United States Department of Justice opened a Civil Rights of Institutionalized Persons Act investigation of CDOC medical care and conditions (and of the Division of Youth Services). That investigation had not produced findings or a consent decree as of August 2026.

The table is not a complete docket. It lists publicly reported CDOC defense outcomes during Weiser's tenure with named parties and amounts or injunctive terms in reliable sources. Amounts are as reported and generally include fees where the source does not break them out. The department typically does not admit liability.

Notable CDOC defense outcomes, 2019-2026
Year	Matter	Claim	Outcome	Amount or relief (as reported)
2019	Saunders-Velez v. CDOC	Transgender prisoner's housing and safety	Settlement announced by the attorney general; Claims Board approved	$170,000
2021	Angel Medina (CDOC warden)	Whistleblower, race discrimination, and retaliation claims	Pre-suit settlement	$406,000
2022	Ruiz v. Colorado Department of Corrections, 1:20-cv-02643 (D. Colo.)	FLSA collective action by parole officers over unpaid on-call time	Settlement; KRDO reported the Attorney General's Office represented CDOC	$5 million common fund (~297 officers)
2022	Mackes v. CDOC (with National Federation of the Blind of Colorado)	ADA access for blind prisoners	Injunctive settlement; Department of Law counsel on the agreement; Office of Risk Management a party	Accessible laptops and related accommodations (no class damages figure reported)
2022 (amended 2025)	Center for Legal Advocacy v. CDOC	ADA access for deaf and hard-of-hearing prisoners	Injunctive settlement; 2025 amendment added monitors	Injunctive relief; Office of Risk Management a party
2022	Brooks v. Colorado Department of Corrections	ADA Title II meal accommodation	Jury verdict; remittitur denied; 10th Circuit later held the judgment paid via restitution intercept	$3.5 million compensatory plus interest
2023	Tanner v. Campbell, 21-cv-02340 (D. Colo.)	Eighth Amendment delayed medical care at Denver Reception and Diagnostic Center; amputations	Settlement approved by the State Claims Board	$8 million
2023	Jones v. Hansen, 20-cv-3548 (D. Colo.)	Eighth Amendment dry-cell confinement at Sterling Correctional Facility	Settlement plus dry-cell policy changes	$500,000
2024	Raven v. Polis, Denver Dist. Ct. 2019CV34492	Class claims by transgender women in CDOC	Consent decree (Department of Law as defense counsel)	About $2.1 million to the class plus housing and care changes through at least 2029
2024	Snorsky v. Raemisch, 1:18-cv-03025 (D. Colo.)	Eighth Amendment failure to protect	Settlement	$1.1 million (inclusive of fees)
2026	Ashaheed v. Porcher, 1:17-cv-03002 (D. Colo.)	First Amendment free exercise (forced beard shave). Colorado Public Radio reported the Attorney General's Office represented the state and the defendant.	Settlement after summary judgment was denied	$245,000 including fees
2026	Hastings v. Colorado Department of Corrections, 1:22-cv-03025 (D. Colo.)	FLSA collective action by Office of Inspector General criminal investigators over unpaid on-call time	Settlement in principle; amount not disclosed in Law360's public report. KRDO reported the Attorney General's Office represented CDOC and hired outside counsel.	Undisclosed as of July 2026
2026	Mortis v. Polis, Denver Dist. Ct. 2022CV30421	State constitutional ban on involuntary servitude	Liability ruling after trial (Department of Law for defendants)	Injunction against using isolation and related punishment to compel prison labor; no damages figure reported

=== Federal litigation against the Trump administration ===
From 2025 the office joined dozens of multi-state suits against Trump administration agencies. The Denver Post reported that House Republicans described Democratic policy and the lawsuits as "poking the bear" and that House Minority Leader Rose Pugliese said the cases "feel like more politically motivated" and that she wanted Colorado "to be careful continuing to put a target on Colorado's back." Weiser described the docket as responses to illegal harm to Colorado and said the cost was justified by federal funds at stake. The 2025 Long Bill added $604,491 General Fund for additional litigation resources aimed at federal-government matters, annualizing to 3.0 FTE. JBC staff later listed reversing that item among General Fund relief options. Democratic legislators kept the positions. Senator Jeff Bridges, then JBC chair, called the spending "an investment ... that will pay dividends in protecting a lot of the investments that we would lose from the federal government." H.B. 25-1321 appropriated $4 million from the Infrastructure Investment and Jobs Act cash fund to the Governor's Office, with authority to reimburse the Department of Law, for personnel and contractors responding to adverse federal action. The Gazette reported in January 2026 that the second-term docket had "so far cost Colorado more than $600,000 in 2025" and that the legislature had authorized more than $1 million for the legal battles. Axios reported the extra attorneys at $604,491 a year. The governor's office said that since December 5, 2025, the state "has fought the federal government to save more than $868 million in funds." Weiser told the Gazette the cost was "worth it, since the lawsuits are meant to recoup billions in federal dollars earmarked for projects throughout Colorado." The office's public "Defending Colorado" list emphasizes federal funds it says it has successfully defended. It does not itemize the state's cost of the docket or outside-counsel payments.

The Colorado Sun reviewed the office's count of 66 suits (tracker updated through June 2026) and reported that courts had partially or fully blocked challenged policies, at least temporarily, in 36 cases, left policies in place in eight, and left 22 pending. The paper noted that most rulings were preliminary and subject to appeal, that Weiser joined other Democratic attorneys general on all of the cases, and that the 66 filings exceeded the 11 he filed in Trump's first term. Later cases included challenges to the relocation of U.S. Space Command, the planned dismantling of the National Center for Atmospheric Research in Boulder, SNAP recertification demands, and withheld energy and transportation funds. A federal court issued a preliminary injunction on the SNAP "pilot" recertification order in January 2026. Critics, including journalists seeking CORA records, have asked what the docket costs taxpayers and how much of the relief is lasting rather than a stay. Those cost records remain behind the fees described below.

=== Criminal appeals and reversed convictions ===
The Criminal Appeals Section is the appellee when defendants challenge felony convictions. Reversals therefore often rest on trial error, not on the Attorney General having tried the case. Joint Budget Committee staff reported the section's brief backlog at 435 at the end of FY 2025 and 468 as of December 31, 2025.

In April 2026 the Colorado Court of Appeals reversed Letecia Stauch's 2023 first-degree murder convictions in the killing of her 11-year-old stepson, Gannon Stauch, and ordered a new trial. The court held that the trial court committed structural error by seating a juror whose son-in-law worked as a deputy district attorney in the prosecuting office. The El Paso County district attorney's office said it was disappointed and would consult the Attorney General's Office about seeking Colorado Supreme Court review. The Department of Law filed a petition for review on June 29, 2026. As of July 2026 the Supreme Court had not decided whether to take the case. If review is denied, the matter returns to the 4th Judicial District for retrial.

In June 2026 the Court of Appeals reversed the criminally negligent homicide conviction of Aurora paramedic Jeremy Cooper in the death of Elijah McClain and remanded for a new trial on a jury-instruction issue about the standard of care. The Attorney General had prosecuted Cooper and co-defendant Peter Cichuniec after the local district attorney declined and Governor Jared Polis directed the office to investigate under Colorado Revised Statutes section 24-31-101. The same division held that the attorney general had authority to prosecute on that executive order. Cichuniec's negligent-homicide conviction was also reversed for a new trial; his second-degree assault conviction was affirmed.

In July 2026 the Court of Appeals reversed David Alberto Garcia's Arapahoe County felony-murder conviction for a second time after an unredacted statement suggesting a confession was played to the jury, the same class of error that had reversed his first conviction. Coverage treated the mistake as the local prosecutor's; the Attorney General's Office was the appellee on appeal.

In March 2026 the Colorado Supreme Court, 4-3, affirmed a Court of Appeals reversal in People v. Day and ordered a new trial on second-degree murder and related counts arising from a 2015 Leadville death. The Attorney General had petitioned to restore Maria Laida Day's convictions. The court held that a defendant must be competent before a mental-condition examination and that the trial court erred by excluding expert mental-condition evidence based on noncooperation while the defendant was incompetent. In a separate 2023 U.S. Supreme Court appeal, Weiser argued Counterman v. Colorado. The Court, 7-2, vacated Billy Counterman's stalking conviction and held that true-threat prosecutions require proof that the speaker was at least reckless as to the threatening nature of the speech. Weiser said the decision "made it more difficult to stop stalkers from tormenting victims."

=== 2024 presidential-ballot litigation ===
Voters, not the attorney general, filed Anderson v. Griswold seeking to keep Donald Trump off Colorado's 2024 Republican presidential primary ballot under Section 3 of the Fourteenth Amendment. The named respondent was Secretary of State Jena Griswold. The Attorney General's Office represented Griswold. A divided Colorado Supreme Court held Trump disqualified and ordered the secretary not to list him. The Supreme Court of the United States unanimously reversed in Trump v. Anderson (March 4, 2024), holding that states lack power to enforce Section 3 against federal candidates. Solicitor General Shannon Stevenson argued for Griswold at the U.S. Supreme Court. The ruling is an outcome of Colorado's election-code litigation and the state supreme court's order, not a case the Attorney General initiated to "remove Trump from the ballot."

In a separate civil-rights defense, the office represented Colorado officials in 303 Creative LLC v. Elenis. The U.S. Supreme Court held in 2023 that the state could not compel a website designer to create speech celebrating a same-sex wedding. Colorado later agreed to pay more than $1.5 million in attorneys' fees, less than the nearly $2 million originally sought. In Chiles v. Salazar (March 31, 2026), Solicitor General Stevenson argued for Colorado officials defending a 2019 law that barred licensed counselors from providing conversion therapy to minors. The U.S. Supreme Court, 8-1, reversed the Tenth Circuit and held that the ban, as applied to talk therapy, regulates speech based on viewpoint and must be reviewed under strict scrutiny. Justice Ketanji Brown Jackson dissented. Weiser called the decision a setback for protecting children from discredited practices. The ruling was not a facial invalidation of all regulation of aversive physical interventions.

In Bella Health and Wellness v. Weiser, a Catholic clinic challenged a 2023 law that treated abortion-pill "reversal" as unprofessional conduct and a deceptive trade practice. U.S. District Judge Daniel Domenico issued a permanent as-applied injunction in August 2025. In January 2026 the state settled attorneys' fees for $6.1 million ($5.4 million to Becket and $700,000 to Alliance Defending Freedom). An Attorney General's Office spokesperson confirmed the fee settlement and otherwise declined comment. Shortly after Weiser took office in 2019, the office and Masterpiece Cakeshop agreed to dismiss remaining administrative and federal cases that had continued after the 2018 U.S. Supreme Court decision in Masterpiece Cakeshop, Ltd. v. Colorado Civil Rights Commission, a Coffman-era case.

In December 2025 the U.S. Department of Justice sued Secretary Griswold in United States v. Griswold to compel production of Colorado's unredacted statewide voter-registration list. On August 3, 2026, Chief Judge Philip Brimmer dismissed the complaint with prejudice. The department appealed to the Tenth Circuit.

=== Consumer protection and antitrust ===
As plaintiff, the office joined large multistate consumer, opioid, and antitrust matters. Settlement money in those cases is deposited in custodial accounts the attorney general administers. In August 2021 Weiser and local governments adopted a memorandum of understanding to allocate opioid-settlement proceeds 10% to the state, 20% to participating local governments, 60% to regions, and 10% to statewide infrastructure. After near-universal local sign-on, the office said Colorado would receive about $385 million from Johnson & Johnson and three national distributors. Colorado's share of the Purdue/Sackler resolution is estimated at $75.67 million of a $7.4 billion national deal. The office's public dashboard lists about $880.6 million in anticipated allocations excluding a pending Albertsons amount; a separate office page totals $912.6 million including $32 million from Albertsons. Colorado received $31.7 million from a 2023 Juul Labs consent judgment. A 2022 40-state settlement with Google over location-tracking practices paid Colorado $8,326,875 of $391.5 million nationwide. Weiser led a 38-state companion case to the Justice Department's Google search-monopoly suit; a D.C. federal court found liability in August 2024 and entered a remedies order in September 2025.

In April 2026 a Manhattan federal jury found Live Nation and Ticketmaster liable for monopolization in a case Colorado and other states continued after the Justice Department settled mid-trial. The jury found a $1.72 per-ticket overcharge in 22 states; damages and structural remedies had not been entered as of August 2026. Opening statements in a 29-state consumer case against Meta over alleged addictive design began August 18, 2026, in Oakland; California, Colorado, Kentucky, and New Jersey tried the first wave. Other reported settlements include $24 million from Greystar in a hidden-fees case with the FTC ($23 million in consumer refunds and $1 million to Colorado), separate $7 million RealPage-related antitrust settlements with Greystar (November 2025) and LivCor (June 2026), a $45 million national Cash App/Block settlement (Colorado's $1,663,539 share is stated by the office), about $1.4 million from HCA over nurse training-repayment contracts, $400,000 from Dollar General, $1.35 million in restitution from Cobblestone Car Wash, and the office's first Colorado False Claims Act settlement of $400,000 from Instawork.

=== Campaign contributions during enforcement ===
In October 2022, during Weiser's campaign for a second term as attorney general, Colorado Politics and The Denver Gazette reported that people tied to Dish Network had contributed nearly $40,000 to Weiser while the office was examining whether Dish had overcharged customers. DirecTV and Comcast were in similar matters. All three companies settled. DirecTV and Comcast were required to refund customers or allow cheaper equivalent service. Dish agreed to stop assessing a $10 monthly HD fee for about 2,500 customers and was not required to issue refunds. Office spokesman Lawrence Pacheco said Dish had voluntarily ended the fee and that "there really was no investigation." Legal experts told the newspapers the contributions did not appear to violate Colorado ethics or pay-to-play contractor bans. Weiser's campaign said it would return Dish-tied gifts from August 2021 through March 2022 and that Weiser "refuses and returns any contributions from anyone tied to a pending investigation."

In June 2026, during Weiser's campaign for governor, CBS News Colorado reporter Shaun Boyd reported that campaign-finance filings showed about $75,000 from 68 attorneys at 12 law firms that were in litigation with the attorney general's office or had just settled. CBS compared donation dates with settlement dates and reported that 66% of those donations were made within four months of the settlements, averaging about $1,300. One example was a settlement with MC Global Holdings, a cannabis company that agreed to pay a $50,000 fine for misrepresenting the health benefits of hemp products. In the month before and the month after that settlement, 10 attorneys at the firm representing the company donated more than $6,000. CBS reported that the donations were legal and that the timing raised questions. A Weiser spokesperson did not address the timing and instead criticized rival Michael Bennet's out-of-state donations and a campaign-finance complaint. CBS reported that the campaign had not said whether it would return the 2026 donations. In a later interview with The Center Square, campaign spokesman Nate Jackson said Weiser "doesn't take contributions from anyone involved in active litigation against his office or who works at a corporation his office is in litigation with."

=== Attorney General Alliance conferences ===
Weiser chaired the Attorney General Alliance, a private association of state attorneys general. In 2022 Axios reported that the group sold high-dollar sponsorships that gave companies invite-only access to attorneys general, including firms that Weiser's office had recently settled with. Weiser told Axios he was not involved in Alliance fundraising, that donors did not set conference programming, and that "anyone who wants access to me can have access to me." CBS News Colorado later reported on the 2021 annual conference at the Grand Wailea in Maui, funded in part by corporate sponsors that included companies state attorneys general were then suing. Weiser held a campaign fundraiser in Maui the day after the conference. Former Republican attorney general Cynthia Coffman, who had endorsed Weiser's 2022 re-election, told CBS the events were educational and that she and Weiser paid for everything except food and drink. A former chair of Colorado's Independent Ethics Commission called the arrangement distasteful but said a legal violation would be hard to prove.

A 2021 campaign-finance complaint by the conservative group Defend Colorado alleged that Weiser's Maui fundraiser under-reported costs. The Colorado Secretary of State's elections division investigated and dismissed the complaint in March 2022, finding that the event was a short gathering in a public bar area, that the resort charged $437.50 for food and beverage, and that the space was not a reportable contribution.

=== Colorado Open Records Act requests ===
In June 2026 The Center Square reported, and the Colorado Freedom of Information Coalition summarized, that journalists sought records of the cost of the office's federal lawsuits, including whether outside firms were paid. The office cited Colorado Open Records Act cost-recovery rules. A full case accounting was estimated at about $331. A request for outside-counsel contracts was first estimated at $289.59. Communications director Lawrence Pacheco said the office did not have a record that provided a detailed fee breakdown and that it could not give legal advice to requesters. Colorado law does not require agencies to help identify records. Jeff Roberts of the Freedom of Information Coalition said high fees impede access. In July 2026, after Weiser won the Democratic gubernatorial primary, The Center Square reported that the office raised the related estimate from $289.59 to $5,129.88, citing 2,517 invoice pages and 983 pages on appointments of special prosecutors and the time required to review and redact privileged material. There is no finding in those reports that the records request concerned spending by Donald Trump's presidential campaign. The dispute is about the taxpayer cost of the Colorado attorney general's lawsuits against the Trump administration.

== List of attorneys general ==
=== Colorado Territory ===
Territorial attorneys general
No.	Attorney general	Party	Term
1	James E. Dalliba	Republican	1861-1862
2	Samuel E. Brown	Republican	1862-1865
3	George W. Chamberlain	Republican	1865-1869
4	Henry C. Thatcher	Republican	1869-1873

From 1873 to 1877 the attorney general position was filled by the United States Attorney because the territorial government did not fund the office. In 1876 Colorado was admitted to the Union as a state.

=== State of Colorado ===
Attorneys general of Colorado
No.	Image	Name	Party	Term
1	Portrait of A. J. Sampson	A. J. Sampson	Republican	1877-1879
2		Charles W. Wright	Republican	1879-1880
3		Charles H. Toll	Republican	1881-1882
4		David F. Urmy	Republican	1883-1884
5		Theodore H. Thomas	Republican	1885-1886
6		Alvin Marsh	Republican	1887-1888
7		Samuel W. Jones	Republican	1889-1890
8		Joseph H. Maupin	Democratic	1891-1892
9		Eugene Engley	People's Party	1893-1894
10	Portrait of Byron L. Carr	Byron L. Carr	Republican	1895-1898
11		David M. Campbell	Republican	1899-1900
12		Charles C. Post	Republican	1901-1902
13		Nathan C. Miller	Republican	1903-1906
14		William H. Dickson	Republican	1907-1908
15	Portrait of John T. Barnett	John T. Barnett	Democratic	1909-1910
16		Benjamin Griffith	Republican	1911-1912
17		Fred Farrar	Democratic	1913-1916
18	Portrait of Leslie E. Hubbard	Leslie E. Hubbard	Democratic	1917-1918
19		Victor E. Keyes	Republican	1919-1922
20		Russel W. Fleming	Democratic	1923-1924
21		Wayne C. Williams	Democratic	1924-1925
22		William Boatright	Republican	1925-1928
23		Robert E. Winbourn	Republican	1929-1930
24		John S. Underwood	Republican	1930-1931
25	Portrait of Clarence L. Ireland	Clarence L. Ireland	Republican	1931-1932
26		Paul P. Prosser	Democratic	1933-1936
27	Portrait of Byron G. Rogers	Byron G. Rogers	Democratic	1936-1940
28		Gail L. Ireland	Republican	1941-1945
29		H. Lawrence Hinkley	Republican	1945-1949
30		John W. Metzger	Democratic	1949-1950
31		Duke W. Dunbar	Republican	1951-1972
32		John P. Moore	Republican	1972-1974
33		J.D. MacFarlane	Democratic	1975-1982
34		Duane Woodard	Republican	1983-1987
34		Duane Woodard	Democratic	1987-1991
35	Portrait of Gale Norton	Gale Norton	Republican	1991-1999
36	Portrait of Ken Salazar	Ken Salazar	Democratic	1999-2005
37	Portrait of John Suthers	John Suthers	Republican	2005-2015
38	Portrait of Cynthia Coffman	Cynthia Coffman	Republican	2015-2019
39	Portrait of Phil Weiser	Phil Weiser	Democratic	2019-present

== See also ==
- Government of Colorado
- Governor of Colorado
- Colorado Department of Corrections
- Colorado State Personnel Board
- State attorney general
- Phil Weiser
- Colorado Attorney General election, 2026
