= Gail L. Ireland =

American politician (1895–1988)

28th Attorney General of Colorado
- In office January 14, 1941 – January 9, 1945
- Governor: Ralph Lawrence Carr; John Charles Vivian
- Preceded by: Byron G. Rogers
- Succeeded by: H. Lawrence Hinkley

Personal details
- Born: November 21, 1895 Denver, Colorado
- Died: February 11, 1988 (aged 92) Denver, Colorado
- Party: Republican

Gail L. Ireland (November 21, 1895 – February 11, 1988) was an American attorney and politician from Denver, Colorado, who served as the Attorney General of Colorado from 1941 to 1945. He later was appointed as Colorado Water Commissioner.

Ireland was also proud of his pro bono work during his law career. During the late 1930s he served as defense attorney for Joe Arridy, a mentally disabled man who had been convicted of the rape and murder of a 15-year-old girl, based on his coerced false confession, and sentenced to death. Ireland served as his counsel after he was imprisoned, seeking to overturn his conviction and sentence through appeals in the courts. Ireland petitioned the Supreme Court of Colorado, writing, "Believe me when I say that if he is gassed, it will take a long time for the state of Colorado to live down the disgrace." The Colorado Supreme Court ultimately denied the petition by a single vote. Although Ireland gained nine stays of his execution, Arridy was finally executed in 1939.

Ireland married and had a family. In the early 21st century, his granddaughter, Terri Bradt, became interested in his career after receiving many of his papers from her mother. She worked with the Friends of Joe Arridy in pursuing a pardon for the young man her father had defended.

In 2011 Arridy received a full and unconditional posthumous pardon by Governor Bill Ritter. Bradt published a biography of her grandfather that year.
