= John W. Metzger =

American politician

John William Metzger

30th Colorado Attorney General
- In office 1949–1950
- Governor: William L. Knous (1947 - 1950); Walter W. Johnson (1950)
- Preceded by: H. Lawrence Hinkley
- Succeeded by: Duke W. Dunbar

Personal details
- Born: April 4, 1911 Cripple Creek, Colorado, U.S.
- Died: January 25, 1984 (aged 72) Denver, Colorado, U.S.
- Resting place: Fairmount Cemetery; Denver, Colorado
- Party: Democratic
- Spouse: Betty Amen
- Children: Karen; John William
- Profession: Lawyer

John William Metzger (April 4, 1911 – January 25, 1984) was a prominent Denver lawyer. He was elected to the Attorney General for the state of Colorado in 1949 for one term. He was also briefly the owner of the historic Trianon property in Colorado Springs, Colorado, before moving much of the art to the Trianon Museum and Art Gallery in Denver.

== Early life ==
John W. Metzger is widely reported to have been born on April 4, 1911, in Logan County, Colorado, though some reports place his birth in Cripple Creek, Colorado, as late as 1914. Metzger's father, Charles William Metzger, homesteaded in Logan County in the early 1900s but abandoned it after a number of years to move to Cripple Creek and take up mining. Metzger's mother, Nora Mahoney Metzger, was previously married to miner named Lacaille and had three children with him. After Lacaille's death Nora married Charles who was now working as a miner. The date of their marriage and the fact they married in Cripple Creek lead the current Metzger family to believe John was born in 1911 or 1912 in Cripple Creek.

Together Charles and Nora had three children, the youngest of whom was John. In 1917 Charles was seriously injured in a mining accident and died shortly after. A few years later Nora died after developing ovarian cancer leaving the three children without any family to care for them. The younger two were declared wards of the state and sent to live in the Colorado Children's Home in Denver. As was the practice at the time, when the children reached the age of 12 they were sent to work for a family in exchange for room and board.

Metzger was sent to the Johnson family near Sterling, Colorado, and worked on their farm. At fourteen he ran away to Denver where he eventually met Hugh Neville. With guidance from Neville, Metzger finished high school and attended Westminster School of Law (now part of University of Denver). Neville represented many Spanish–American War veterans and when he began to have difficulty speaking he had Metzger present to the court on his behalf. In 1936 Metzger was admitted to the bar by Hadlett P. Burke, even though he had not yet finished his formal law degree.

== Professional life ==
John Metzger was considered a "people's attorney" and represented many common people in issues involving widows' pensions, probate matters, small business, and estate planning. For his work on behalf of the Spanish–American War veterans he was granted an honorary membership in the United Spanish War Veterans association. From 1938 to 1941 he served as clerk and referee of the Denver Juvenile Court in addition to his legal practice. Metzger worked as a legal practitioner alone and was never part of a firm.

Metzger was turned down for service in World War II due to stomach ulcers. During the war he opened a munitions manufacturing plant originally named John W. Metzger Co. which produced 20mm anti-aircraft shells. The plant eventually produced shells for .09 cents each with a low failure rate and earned an Army-Navy "E" for excellence.

In addition to his legal work, Metzger owned many rental properties in Denver and raised cattle on a 320-acre rural property near the town of Broomfield, Colorado.

== Politics ==
Like many American youth in the early 1930s, Metzger supported Franklin Delano Roosevelt's Democratic bid for U.S. President. Metzger also served as the sixth president of the Colorado Young Democrats from 1937 to 1940.

After Metzger moved to Adams County, Colorado in the mid-1940s, he took more of an interest in local politics eventually going to the Democratic National Convention in 1948 as a delegate. He soon became the county Democratic Party chair and Colorado's Second Congressional District Chairman. In 1948 he was elected Colorado Attorney General.

Metzger used his new position to challenge the status quo; he required state commissions to comply with state purchasing laws and stop giving out no-bid contracts, he started a campaign against illegal gambling, and in one of his biggest moves he banned using school facilities for religious activities which he believed violated the state constitution. 'Rocky Mountain News' editorial columnist Lee Casey wrote:

Thus far in his career, Mr. Metzger has not demonstrated the possession of a great store of legal learning. But he is certainly active, he pokes his long nose into everything and he doesn't mind trouble. And thereby he affords a decided contrast to most of the incumbents of his high office. ... He affords welcome relief from the reluctance of so many officials to take a position. He may get into trouble but at least he gives the action that is badly needed in public life.

Although in August 1949 he declared that he had no interest in running for any future political office, in the summer of 1950 he ran once again for attorney general where he was defeated. In 1952 he choose to run for governor but lost to incumbent Dan Thornton. In the following years he stayed engaged in local politics and ran for state office a number of times but was never elected.

== Personal life ==
John Metzger married Betty Amen on December 26, 1944. They had two children together Karen, born in 1945, and John William, born in 1949.

Around 1960 the historic Trianon property (formerly called "Claremont") in Colorado Springs was transferred to Metzger after the nuns for whom Metzger had helped acquire the property found they could not afford the upkeep. Metzger attempted to run it as a museum but due to issues regarding zoning laws was not able to keep it profitable. Metzger sold large portions of the art and book collection, including around 15,000 rare books to Colorado State University. Eventually he sold the property to The Colorado Springs School. He brought the remaining art pieces to Denver and placed them in a building at 14th Avenue and Tremont Street which became known as the Trianon Museum and Art Gallery. Metzger and his family maintained the museum until it closed in 2004.

John Metzger died of colon cancer in 1984 and is entombed in mausoleum at Fairmount Cemetery, in Denver. Betty Metzger died February 19, 2008, and was interred at Fairmount Cemetery.

Party political offices
Preceded by Walter Walford Johnson	Democratic nominee for Governor of Colorado; 1952	Succeeded by Edwin C. Johnson
