= List of governors of Colorado =

Governor of Colorado
- Seal of the Executive Office

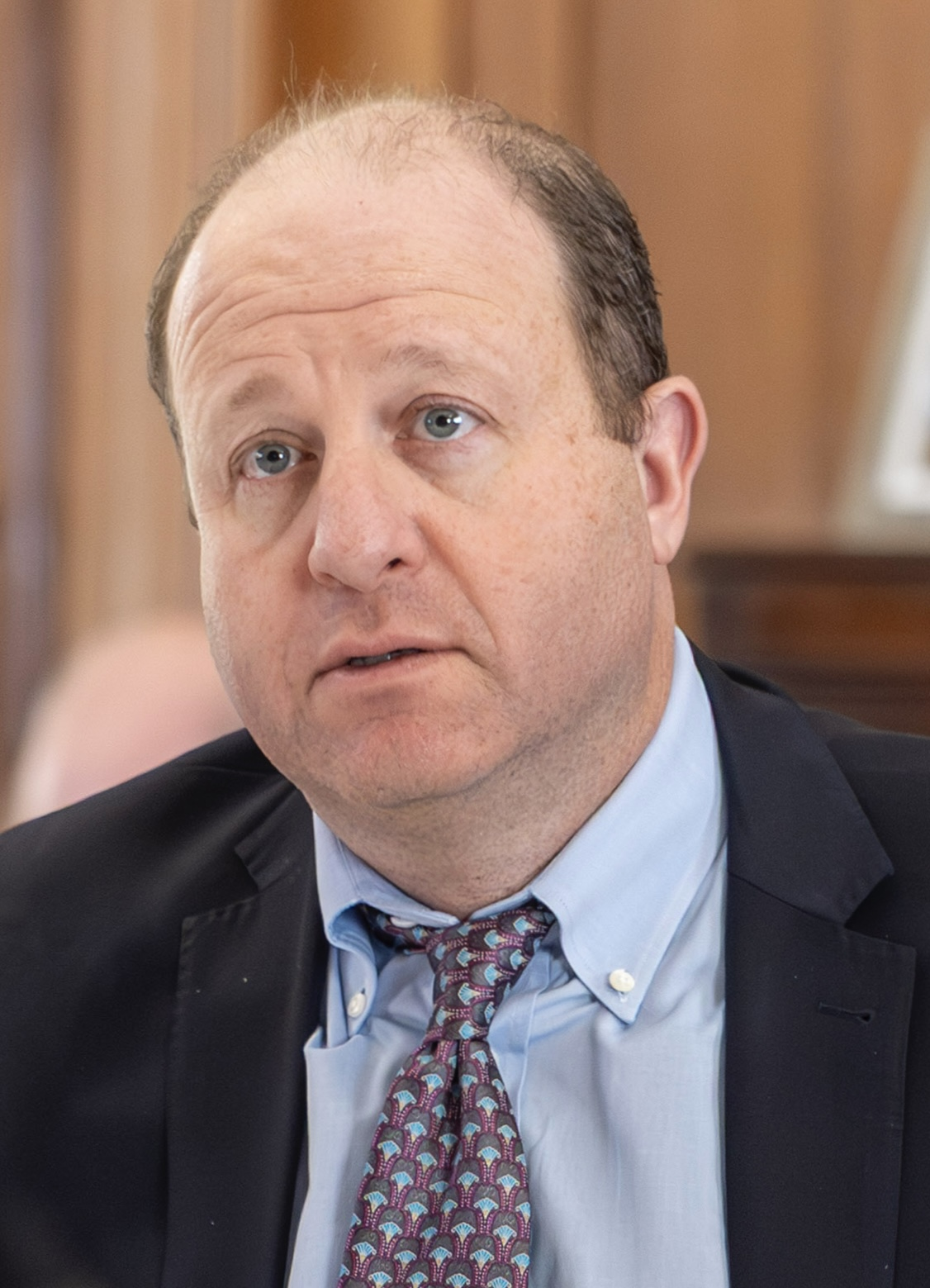
- Incumbent; Jared Polis since January 8, 2019
- Government of Colorado
- Style: The Honorable
- Type: Chief executive; Head of government; Commander-in-chief
- Residence: Colorado Governor's Mansion
- Term length: Four years, renewable once consecutively
- Inaugural holder: John Long Routt
- Formation: August 1, 1876
- Succession: Line of succession
- Deputy: Lieutenant Governor of Colorado
- Salary: $90,000 (2022)
- Website: www.colorado.gov/governor

The governor of Colorado is the head of government of the U.S. state of Colorado. The governor is the head of the executive branch of Colorado's state government and is charged with enforcing state laws. The governor has the power to either approve or veto bills passed by the Colorado General Assembly, to convene the legislature, and to grant pardons, except in cases of treason or impeachment. The governor is also the commander-in-chief of the state's military forces.

Seven people served as governor of Colorado Territory over eight terms, appointed by the president of the United States. Since statehood, there have been 38 governors, serving 43 distinct terms. One governor Alva Adams served three non-consecutive terms, while John Long Routt, James Hamilton Peabody, and Edwin C. Johnson each served during two non-consecutive periods. The longest-serving governors were Richard Lamm (1975–1987) and Roy Romer (1987–1999), who each served 12 years over three terms. The shortest term occurred on March 16 and 17, 1905, when the state had three governors in the span of 24 hours: Alva Adams won the election, but soon after he took office, the legislature declared his opponent, James Hamilton Peabody, governor, but on the condition that he immediately resign, so that his lieutenant governor, Jesse Fuller McDonald, could be governor. Thus, Peabody served less than a day as governor.

The current governor is Democrat Jared Polis, who took office on January 8, 2019.

== List of governors ==
=== Territory of Jefferson ===
The self-proclaimed Provisional Government of the Territory of Jefferson was organized on November 7, 1859. Jefferson Territory included all of present-day Colorado, but extended about 3 miles (5 km) farther east, 138 miles (222 km) farther north, and about 50 miles (80 km) farther west. The territory was never recognized by the federal government in the tumultuous days before the American Civil War. The Jefferson Territory had only one governor, Robert Williamson Steele, a pro-union Democrat elected by popular vote. He proclaimed the territory dissolved on June 6, 1861, several months after the official formation of the Colorado Territory, but only days after the arrival of its first governor.

=== Territory of Colorado ===
The Territory of Colorado was organized on February 28, 1861, from parts of the territories of New Mexico, Utah, and Nebraska, and the unorganized territory that was previously the western portion of Kansas Territory.

Governors of the Territory of Colorado
No.	Governor	Term in office (Note: The range given is from the date the governor was confirmed by the Senate, or appointed by the President during a Senate recess, to the date the governor's successor was confirmed, unless noted.)	Appointed by
1	William Gilpin (1813–1894)	March 25, 1861 (Note: Gilpin was nominated on March 22, 1861, and confirmed by the Senate on March 25. He arrived in the territory on May 27; however, he was not formally sworn in until July 8, after the territorial courts were set up.) – March 26, 1862 (367 days; replaced) (Note: Gilpin was removed from office for improper financial drafts from the federal treasury.)	Abraham Lincoln
2	John Evans (1814–1897)	March 26, 1862 (Note: Evans was nominated on March 18, 1862, and confirmed by the Senate on March 26. He was sworn in as governor in Washington, D.C., on April 11, and arrived in the territory on May 16.) – October 17, 1865 (1302 days; resigned) (Note: Evans resigned at the request of President Andrew Johnson on July 18, 1865, following the Sand Creek massacre.)	Abraham Lincoln
3	Alexander Cummings (1810–1879)	October 17, 1865 (Note: It is ambiguous exactly when Evans resigned and Cummings was appointed. Secretary of State William H. Seward requested Evans' resignation on July 18, 1865, and Evans submitted it on September 4. Modern sources say Cummings was appointed on October 17, during a Senate recess, and sworn in to office on October 21; however, contemporary news reported on his appointment as early as August 18, and other major sources say he was appointed on August 8. He was formally nominated on December 19, and confirmed by the Senate on January 26, 1866.) – May 8, 1867 (569 days; resigned) (Note: Cummings resigned after being accused of misappropriating funds; despite being cleared of wrongdoing, his political career in the territory had been ruined. Sources vary on when he resigned; modern sources almost all say April 1867, but the best contemporary sources found say he tendered his resignation on May 8, the same day his successor was appointed.)	Andrew Johnson
4	Alexander Cameron Hunt (1825–1894)	May 8, 1867 (Note: Hunt was appointed on May 8, 1867, during a Senate recess; nominated on July 20; and confirmed by the Senate on November 29.) – April 19, 1869 (713 days; replaced)	Andrew Johnson
5	Edward M. McCook (1833–1909)	April 19, 1869 (Note: McCook was nominated on April 15, 1869, confirmed by the Senate on April 19, and took office on June 15.) – April 17, 1873 (1460 days; replaced) (Note: Sources vary on why McCook left office. Grant's nomination of his successor specified that McCook declined reappointment; the Colorado State Archives say locals petitioned for his removal; and McMullin & Walker say Grant refused to reappoint him.)	Ulysses S. Grant
6	Samuel Hitt Elbert (1833–1899)	April 17, 1873 (Note: Elbert was nominated on March 19, 1873, and confirmed by the Senate on March 20, for a term to begin April 17.) – June 19, 1874 (Note: Most sources do not specify when Elbert left office. According to news dated July 22, 1874, he was still claiming to be governor, and that his successor likely arrived in the territory on July 24.) (429 days; replaced)	Ulysses S. Grant
7	Edward M. McCook (1833–1909)	June 19, 1874 (Note: McCook was nominated on January 28, 1874, and confirmed by the Senate on June 19. He was sworn in out of state on June 26, and took office in the territory probably on July 26.) – February 8, 1875 (235 days; replaced) (Note: Grant's appointment of McCook's successor specified that McCook resigned; contemporary news reports say that he was asked to resign, but refused.)	Ulysses S. Grant
8	John Long Routt (1826–1907)	February 8, 1875 (Note: Routt was nominated and confirmed by the Senate on February 8, 1875, and took office on March 29.) – November 3, 1876 (635 days; elected state governor)	Ulysses S. Grant

=== State of Colorado ===
The State of Colorado was admitted to the Union on August 1, 1876.

To serve as governor, one must be at least 30 years old, be a citizen of the United States, and have been a resident of the state for at least two years prior to election. The state constitution of 1876 originally called for election of the governor every two years, with their term beginning on the second Tuesday of the January following the election. An amendment passed in 1956, taking effect in 1959, increased terms to four years. Originally, there was no term limit applied to the governor; a 1990 amendment allowed governors to succeed themselves only once. There is however no limit on the total number of terms one may serve as long as one who has served the two term limit is out of office for four years.

Should the office of governor become vacant, the lieutenant governor becomes governor. If both the offices governor and lieutenant governor are vacant, the line of succession moves down through the senior members of the state senate and state house of representatives of the same party as the governor. The lieutenant governor was elected separately from the governor until a 1968 amendment to the constitution made it so that they are elected on the same ticket.

Governors of the State of Colorado
No.	Governor	Term in office	Party	Election	Lt. Governor (Note: Lieutenant governors represented the same party as their governor unless noted.)
1	John Long Routt (1826–1907)	November 3, 1876 – January 14, 1879 (803 days; retired)	Republican	1876	Lafayette Head
2	Frederick Walker Pitkin (1837–1886)	January 14, 1879 – January 9, 1883 (1457 days; retired) (Note: Sobel & Raimo note that Pitkin ran unsuccessfully for Republican nomination for the United States Senate in 1882, but it is unknown which of the two Senate races that year he was running in.)	Republican	1878	Horace Tabor
2	Frederick Walker Pitkin (1837–1886)	January 14, 1879 – January 9, 1883 (1457 days; retired)	Republican	1880	Horace Tabor
3	James Benton Grant (1848–1911)	January 9, 1883 – January 13, 1885 (736 days; retired)	Democratic	1882	William H. Meyer (Note: Represented the Republican Party)
4	Benjamin Harrison Eaton (1833–1904)	January 13, 1885 – January 11, 1887 (729 days; retired)	Republican	1884	Peter W. Breene
5	Alva Adams (1850–1922)	January 11, 1887 – January 8, 1889 (729 days; retired)	Democratic	1886	Norman H. Meldrum
6	Job Adams Cooper (1843–1899)	January 8, 1889 – January 13, 1891 (736 days; retired)	Republican	1888	William Grover Smith
7	John Long Routt (1826–1907)	January 13, 1891 – January 10, 1893 (729 days; retired)	Republican	1890	William Story
8	Davis Hanson Waite (1825–1901)	January 10, 1893 – January 8, 1895 (729 days; lost election)	People's (Note: Kallenbach labels Waite as a Populist and Silver Democrat.)	1892	David H. Nichols
9	Albert McIntire (1853–1935)	January 8, 1895 – January 12, 1897 (736 days; retired)	Republican	1894	Jared L. Brush
10	Alva Adams (1850–1922)	January 12, 1897 – January 10, 1899 (729 days; retired)	Democratic	1896	Jared L. Brush
11	Charles S. Thomas (1849–1934)	January 10, 1899 – January 8, 1901 (729 days; retired)	Democratic (Note: Thomas was a Democrat, but he has been described as a fusion candidate, as he also had support from the People's Party.)	1898	Francis Patrick Carney (Note: Represented the Populist Party)
12	James Bradley Orman (1849–1919)	January 8, 1901 – January 13, 1903 (736 days; retired)	Democratic (Note: Orman was a Democrat, and was also nominated by the People's Party.)	1900	David C. Coates (Note: The Colorado State Archives labels Coates a Democrat; however, a contemporary New York Times article describes him as a Populist elected on a fusion ticket, and that he had renounced all other parties and become a Socialist.)
13	James Hamilton Peabody (1852–1917)	January 13, 1903 – January 10, 1905 (729 days; lost election) (Note: The 1904 election was rife with fraud and controversy. Alva Adams won election, but soon after he took office the Republican legislature declared James Peabody to be the actual winner, on the condition that Peabody immediately tender his resignation, postdated to the next day. Peabody's lieutenant governor, Jesse McDonald, then succeeded to the governorship.)	Republican	1902	Warren A. Haggott (Note: The Colorado State Archives says Haggott served from 1902 to 1903; however, multiple sources say he served with Peabody well into 1904.)
14	Alva Adams (1850–1922)	January 10, 1905 – March 16, 1905 (66 days; lost election)	Democratic	1904	Arthur Cornforth
15	James Hamilton Peabody (1852–1917)	March 16, 1905 – March 17, 1905 (1 day; resigned)	Republican	1904	Jesse Fuller McDonald
16	Jesse Fuller McDonald (1858–1942)	March 17, 1905 – January 8, 1907 (663 days; retired)	Republican	Succeeded from lieutenant governor	Arthur Cornforth (Note: Represented the Democratic Party) (removed July 5, 1905)
16	Jesse Fuller McDonald (1858–1942)	March 17, 1905 – January 8, 1907 (663 days; retired)	Republican	Succeeded from lieutenant governor	Fred W. Parks
17	Henry Augustus Buchtel (1847–1924)	January 8, 1907 – January 12, 1909 (736 days; retired)	Republican	1906	Erastus Harper
18	John F. Shafroth (1854–1922)	January 12, 1909 – January 14, 1913 (1464 days; retired) (Note: Shafroth was instead elected to the United States Senate.)	Democratic	1908	Stephen R. Fitzgarrald
18	John F. Shafroth (1854–1922)	January 12, 1909 – January 14, 1913 (1464 days; retired)	Democratic	1910	Stephen R. Fitzgarrald
19	Elias M. Ammons (1860–1925)	January 14, 1913 – January 12, 1915 (729 days; retired)	Democratic	1912	Benjamin F. Montgomery
20	George Alfred Carlson (1876–1926)	January 12, 1915 – January 9, 1917 (729 days; lost election)	Republican	1914	Moses E. Lewis
21	Julius Caldeen Gunter (1858–1940)	January 9, 1917 – January 14, 1919 (736 days; lost nomination)	Democratic	1916	James Pulliam
22	Oliver Henry Shoup (1869–1940)	January 14, 1919 – January 9, 1923 (1457 days; retired)	Republican	1918	George Stephan
22	Oliver Henry Shoup (1869–1940)	January 14, 1919 – January 9, 1923 (1457 days; retired)	Republican	1920	Earl Cooley
23	William Ellery Sweet (1869–1942)	January 9, 1923 – January 13, 1925 (736 days; lost election)	Democratic	1922	Robert F. Rockwell
24	Clarence Morley (1869–1948)	January 13, 1925 – January 11, 1927 (729 days; retired)	Republican	1924	Sterling Byrd Lacy
25	Billy Adams (1861–1954)	January 11, 1927 – January 10, 1933 (2192 days; retired)	Democratic	1926	George Milton Corlett
25	Billy Adams (1861–1954)	January 11, 1927 – January 10, 1933 (2192 days; retired)	Democratic	1928	George Milton Corlett
25	Billy Adams (1861–1954)	January 11, 1927 – January 10, 1933 (2192 days; retired)	Democratic	1930	Edwin C. Johnson
26	Edwin C. Johnson (1884–1970)	January 10, 1933 – January 2, 1937 (1454 days; resigned) (Note: Johnson resigned, having been elected to the United States Senate.)	Democratic	1932	Ray Herbert Talbot
26	Edwin C. Johnson (1884–1970)	January 10, 1933 – January 2, 1937 (1454 days; resigned)	Democratic	1934	Ray Herbert Talbot
27	Ray Herbert Talbot (1896–1955)	January 2, 1937 – January 12, 1937 (11 days; retired)	Democratic	Succeeded from lieutenant governor	Vacant
28	Teller Ammons (1895–1972)	January 12, 1937 – January 10, 1939 (729 days; lost election)	Democratic	1936	Frank Hayes
29	Ralph Lawrence Carr (1887–1950)	January 10, 1939 – January 12, 1943 (1464 days; retired) (Note: Carr instead ran unsuccessfully for the United States Senate.)	Republican	1938	John Charles Vivian
29	Ralph Lawrence Carr (1887–1950)	January 10, 1939 – January 12, 1943 (1464 days; retired)	Republican	1940	John Charles Vivian
30	John Charles Vivian (1887–1964)	January 12, 1943 – January 14, 1947 (1464 days; retired)	Republican	1942	William Eugene Higby
30	John Charles Vivian (1887–1964)	January 12, 1943 – January 14, 1947 (1464 days; retired)	Republican	1944	William Eugene Higby
31	William Lee Knous (1889–1959)	January 14, 1947 – April 15, 1950 (1188 days; resigned) (Note: Knous resigned, having been confirmed to the United States District Court for the District of Colorado.)	Democratic	1946	Homer Pearson
31	William Lee Knous (1889–1959)	January 14, 1947 – April 15, 1950 (1188 days; resigned)	Democratic	1948	Walter Walford Johnson
32	Walter Walford Johnson (1904–1987)	April 15, 1950 – January 9, 1951 (270 days; lost election)	Democratic	Succeeded from lieutenant governor	Charles P. Murphy
33	Daniel I. J. Thornton (1911–1976)	January 9, 1951 – January 11, 1955 (1464 days; retired)	Republican	1950	Gordon Allott
33	Daniel I. J. Thornton (1911–1976)	January 9, 1951 – January 11, 1955 (1464 days; retired)	Republican	1952	Gordon Allott
34	Edwin C. Johnson (1884–1970)	January 11, 1955 – January 8, 1957 (729 days; retired)	Democratic	1954	Stephen McNichols
35	Stephen McNichols (1914–1997)	January 8, 1957 – January 8, 1963 (2192 days; lost election)	Democratic	1956	Frank L. Hays
35	Stephen McNichols (1914–1997)	January 8, 1957 – January 8, 1963 (2192 days; lost election)	Democratic	1958 (Note: First term under a 1956 constitutional amendment, which lengthened terms to four years.)	Robert Lee Knous
36	John A. Love (1916–2002)	January 8, 1963 – July 16, 1973 (3843 days; resigned) (Note: Love resigned, having been appointed Director of the Office of Energy Policy.)	Republican	1962	Robert Lee Knous
36	John A. Love (1916–2002)	January 8, 1963 – July 16, 1973 (3843 days; resigned)	Republican	1966	Mark Anthony Hogan
36	John A. Love (1916–2002)	January 8, 1963 – July 16, 1973 (3843 days; resigned)	Republican	1970	John D. Vanderhoof
37	John D. Vanderhoof (1922–2013)	July 16, 1973 – January 14, 1975 (548 days; lost election)	Republican	Succeeded from lieutenant governor	Ted L. Strickland
38	Richard Lamm (1935–2021)	January 14, 1975 – January 13, 1987 (4383 days; retired)	Democratic	1974	George L. Brown
38	Richard Lamm (1935–2021)	January 14, 1975 – January 13, 1987 (4383 days; retired)	Democratic	1978	Nancy Dick
38	Richard Lamm (1935–2021)	January 14, 1975 – January 13, 1987 (4383 days; retired)	Democratic	1982	Nancy Dick
39	Roy Romer (b. 1928)	January 13, 1987 – January 12, 1999 (4383 days; term-limited) (Note: Under a 1990 amendment to the constitution, governors may not serve more than two consecutive terms.)	Democratic	1986	Mike Callihan (resigned May 10, 1994)
39	Roy Romer (b. 1928)	January 13, 1987 – January 12, 1999 (4383 days; term-limited)	Democratic	1990	Mike Callihan (resigned May 10, 1994)
39	Roy Romer (b. 1928)	January 13, 1987 – January 12, 1999 (4383 days; term-limited)	Democratic	1990	Vacant
39	Roy Romer (b. 1928)	January 13, 1987 – January 12, 1999 (4383 days; term-limited)	Democratic	1990	Samuel H. Cassidy (took office May 11, 1994)
39	Roy Romer (b. 1928)	January 13, 1987 – January 12, 1999 (4383 days; term-limited)	Democratic	1994	Gail Schoettler
40	Bill Owens (b. 1950)	January 12, 1999 – January 9, 2007 (2920 days; term-limited)	Republican	1998	Joe Rogers
40	Bill Owens (b. 1950)	January 12, 1999 – January 9, 2007 (2920 days; term-limited)	Republican	2002	Jane Norton
41	Bill Ritter (b. 1956)	January 9, 2007 – January 11, 2011 (1464 days; retired)	Democratic	2006	Barbara O'Brien
42	John Hickenlooper (b. 1952)	January 11, 2011 – January 8, 2019 (2920 days; term-limited)	Democratic	2010	Joseph Garcia (resigned May 12, 2016)
42	John Hickenlooper (b. 1952)	January 11, 2011 – January 8, 2019 (2920 days; term-limited)	Democratic	2014	Joseph Garcia (resigned May 12, 2016)
42	John Hickenlooper (b. 1952)	January 11, 2011 – January 8, 2019 (2920 days; term-limited)	Democratic	2014	Donna Lynne
43	Jared Polis (b. 1975)	January 8, 2019 – Incumbent (Note: Polis' second term began on January 10, 2023, and will expire on January 12, 2027; he is term-limited.) (in office 2876 days)	Democratic	2018	Dianne Primavera
43	Jared Polis (b. 1975)	January 8, 2019 – Incumbent (in office 2876 days)	Democratic	2022	Dianne Primavera
44	Phil Weiser (b. 1968)	Governor-elect takes office January 12, 2027	Democratic	2026	Lesley Dahlkemper

== Timeline ==
Timeline of Colorado governors

== See also ==
- Gubernatorial lines of succession in the United States § Colorado
- List of lieutenant governors of Colorado
- List of Colorado legislatures

== Sources ==
- "Governors of Colorado". National Governors Association.
- "Governors". Colorado State Archives. Archived from the original on August 2, 2026.
- "The Territorial Governors Collection". Colorado State Archives. Archived from the original on September 30, 2007.
- "Colorado Constitution". State Democracy Research Initiative. University of Wisconsin Law School.
- Glashan, Roy R. (1979). American Governors and Gubernatorial Elections, 1775-1978. Meckler Books. ISBN 0-7201-1511-6 – via Internet Archive.
- Kallenbach, Joseph E.; Kallenbach, Jessamine S. (1977). American State Governors, 1776-1976. Oceana Publications. ISBN 978-0-379-00665-0 – via Internet Archive.
- McMullin, Thomas A.; Walker, David (1984). Biographical Directory of American Territorial Governors. Meckler Publishing. ISBN 0-930466-11-X – via Internet Archive.
- Mullaney, Marie Marmo (1994). Biographical Directory of the Governors of the United States, 1988–1994. Greenwood Publishing Group. ISBN 0-313-28312-5 – via Internet Archive.
- Sobel, Robert; Raimo, John (1978). Biographical Directory of the Governors of the United States, 1789-1978. Vol. 1. Meckler Books. ISBN 0-930466-01-2 – via Internet Archive.
- Thorpe, Francis Newton, ed. (1909). The Federal and State Constitutions, Colonial Charters, and Other Organic Laws of the States, Territories, and Colonies Now or Heretofore Forming the United States of America. Vol. 1. United States Government Publishing Office – via Internet Archive.
- University of Colorado (1907). The University of Colorado Studies. Vol. IV – via Google Books.
