= Robert F. Rockwell =

American politician (1886–1950)

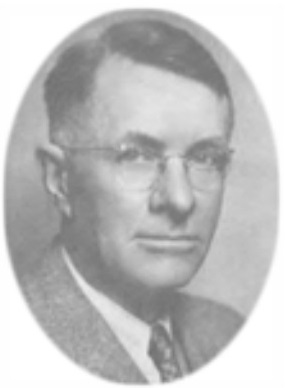
- From 1980's Presidents And Speakers of the Colorado General Assembly: A Biographical Portrait from 1876.

Member of the U.S. House of Representatives from Colorado's 4th district
- In office December 9, 1941 – January 3, 1949
- Preceded by: Edward T. Taylor
- Succeeded by: Wayne Aspinall

Lieutenant Governor of Colorado
- In office 1923–1925
- Governor: William Ellery Sweet
- Preceded by: Earl Cooley
- Succeeded by: Sterling Byrd Lacy

Member of the Colorado Senate from the 11th District
- In office 1938–1941
- Preceded by: E. Clair Hotchkiss
- Succeeded by: Charles E. Blaine
- In office 1921–1923
- Preceded by: John F. Pearson
- Succeeded by: J. E. Moore

Member of the Colorado House of Representatives from Delta County
- In office 1915–1921
- Preceded by: George W. Bruce
- Succeeded by: Thomas R. Blackwell

Personal details
- Born: Robert Fay Rockwell; February 11, 1886 Cortland, New York, U.S.
- Died: September 29, 1950 (aged 64) Maher, Colorado, U.S.
- Resting place: Hornell Cemetery, Hornell, New York
- Party: Republican
- Children: 2
- Education: Princeton University (attended)
- Occupation: Cattle rancher, politician

Robert Fay Rockwell (February 11, 1886 – September 29, 1950) was a U.S. representative from Colorado for four terms from 1941 to 1949. He served in the Colorado Senate and House of Representatives. He was also Lieutenant Governor of Colorado. He was a cattle rancher in western Colorado.

== Early life and education ==
Born in Cortland, New York, he was the son of Lemuel Wilson and Elizabeth (Smith) Rockwell. Rockwell attended the public schools of Hornell, New York and was a 1905 graduate of The Hill School in Pottstown, Pennsylvania. He attended Princeton University from 1905 to 1906.

== Career ==
He moved to Paonia, Colorado, in 1907 and engaged in cattle raising and fruit growing.

He served as member of the Colorado House of Representatives from 1917 to 1921. He served in the state senate from 1921 to 1923. He served as lieutenant governor from 1923 to 1925. In 1924, he was an unsuccessful candidate for the Republican nomination for governor, losing to Clarence Morley, who went on to win the general election. Rockwell was the Republican nominee for governor in 1930, and lost to incumbent Billy Adams. He served as member of the State board of agriculture from 1932 to 1946. Rockwell was again a member of the state senate from 1938 to 1941.

Rockwell was elected as a Republican to the Seventy-seventh Congress to fill the vacancy caused by the death of Edward T. Taylor. He was reelected to the Seventy-eighth, Seventy-ninth, and Eightieth Congresses and served from December 9, 1941, to January 3, 1949. He was an unsuccessful candidate for reelection in 1948 to the Eighty-first Congress. After leaving Congress, Rockwell resumed cattle ranching in Colorado. He served as chairman of the board of directors of Tuttle & Rockwell Co., Hornell, New York, and Rockwell Co., Corning, New York.

He was a member of the Sons of the American Revolution. He was also a Mason and a member of the Paonia Rotary Club.

== Personal life ==
He married Aileen Miller on June 24, 1908 and had two sons, Robert F. Rockwell Jr. and Wilson M. Rockwell. He had a home in Miami, Florida and a ranch in Colorado. Aileen died at their home in Miami on March 5, 1938. He married Elizabeth Armstrong on November 23, 1948.

== Death and burial ==
He died unexpectedly of a cerebral hemorrhage at his home in Maher, Colorado on September 29, 1950. He was interred in Hornell Cemetery, Hornell, New York.

== Electoral results ==
1941 Colorado's 4th congressional district special election
Party	Candidate	Votes	%
Republican	Robert F. Rockwell	19,918	54.04
Democratic	Frank Delaney	16,941	45.96
Total votes		36,859	100.0
Republican gain from Democratic			

1942 United States House of Representatives elections
Party	Candidate	Votes	%
Republican	Robert F. Rockwell (Incumbent)	28,460	58.75
Democratic	Elizabeth E. Pellet	19,979	41.25
Total votes		48,439	100.0
Republican hold			

1944 United States House of Representatives elections
Party	Candidate	Votes	%
Republican	Robert F. Rockwell (Incumbent)	38,671	61.67
Democratic	John L. Heuschkel	24,039	38.33
Total votes		62,710	100.0
Republican hold			

1946 United States House of Representatives elections
Party	Candidate	Votes	%
Republican	Robert F. Rockwell (Incumbent)	28,894	58.75
Democratic	Thomas Matthews	20,290	41.25
Total votes		49,184	100.0
Republican hold			

1948 United States House of Representatives elections
Party	Candidate	Votes	%
Democratic	Wayne Aspinall	34,695	51.86
Republican	Robert F. Rockwell (Incumbent)	32,206	48.14
Total votes		66,901	100.0
Democratic gain from Republican			

Party political offices
Preceded by William L. Boatright	Republican nominee for Governor of Colorado; 1930	Succeeded by James D. Parriott
Political offices
Preceded by Earl Cooley	Lieutenant Governor of Colorado; 1923–1925	Succeeded by Sterling Byrd Lacy
U.S. House of Representatives
Preceded by Edward T. Taylor	Member of the U.S. House of Representatives from Colorado's 4th congressional district December 9, 1941 – January 3, 1949	Succeeded by Wayne Aspinall
