= Robert E. DeNier =

American politician

Robert Eugene DeNier

Member of the Colorado Senate from the 6th district
- In office January 14, 1987 – January 9, 1991
- Preceded by: Dan D. Noble
- Succeeded by: Sam Cassidy

Member of the Colorado House of Representatives from the 59th district
- In office January 12, 1977 – January 12, 1983
- Preceded by: Roy E. Wells
- Succeeded by: Ben Nighthorse Campbell

Personal details
- Born: Robert Eugene DeNier; October 20, 1921 Denver
- Died: April 12, 2010 (aged 88) Durango, Colorado
- Party: Republican
- Spouse: Wilma DeNier (née Spargo)
- Children: 3
- Profession: FBI special agent, Sheriff's deputy, Politician

Robert Eugene DeNier (October 20, 1921 – April 12, 2010) was a Republican legislator from Colorado, U.S. He served one four-year term in the Colorado Senate, from 1987 to 1991, and three two-year terms in the Colorado House of Representatives, from 1977 to 1983. In 1982, he was an unsuccessful candidate for lieutenant governor, running alongside gubernatorial candidate John D. Fuhr and losing to the governor/lieutenant governor candidates Richard Lamm and Nancy Dick.

== Life before politics ==
DeNier was born in 1921 in Denver and graduated from South High School there in 1939. He attended the University of Denver for eighteen months and then enlisted in the United States Military. He served in the Army Signal Corps in Europe during World War II. He was discharged in 1945 and re-enrolled in the University of Denver, earning a degree in business administration.

Following graduation, he was hired by the Federal Bureau of Investigation and was assigned to posts in Alabama and New York before taking a position in Durango, Colorado. For two decades, he was the only FBI agent deployed in southwest Colorado. He retired from the FBI in 1974 and worked for a time for the La Plata County Sheriff's Office. Along the way, he earned a teaching certificate and a master's degree in counseling from Adams State College.

== Career in politics ==
In 1976, DeNier ran for a seat in the Colorado House of Representatives. His candidacy was successful, and he entered office in 1977 representing the 59th district. He was re-elected two times, serving a total of six years, retiring from the State House in early 1983.

In 1982, during his last full year in the State House, he was the Republican candidate for lieutenant governor. He ran alongside gubernatorial candidate John D. Fuhr. The pair were defeated by Democrats Richard Lamm and Nancy Dick.

Following this loss, DeNier re-entered politics in 1986, running to represent District 6 in the Colorado Senate. In the race, he defeated Democrat Ann Brown and served a single four-year term in the senate, his last elected position.

== House and Senate committee work ==
In both the State Senate and State House, DeNier served on the appropriations committees and the powerful Joint Budget Committee. He also served on several other committees.

== Personal life and death ==
DeNier married the former Wilma Evelyn Spargo on November 27, 1945, in Denver. They had two sons and one daughter.

The Robert DeNier Youth Services Center in Durango was named for him. DeNier died on April 12, 2010, in Durango.
