= Samuel Cassidy =

Samuel Cassidy or Sam Cassidy may refer to:

- Samuel H. Cassidy, attorney and lieutenant governor of Colorado
- Samuel James Cassidy (1963–2021), perpetrator of the 2021 San Jose shooting
- Sam Cassidy (The Thick of It)
