= 2023–24 Pueblo mayoral election =

- November 7, 2023 (first round); January 23, 2024 (runoff)
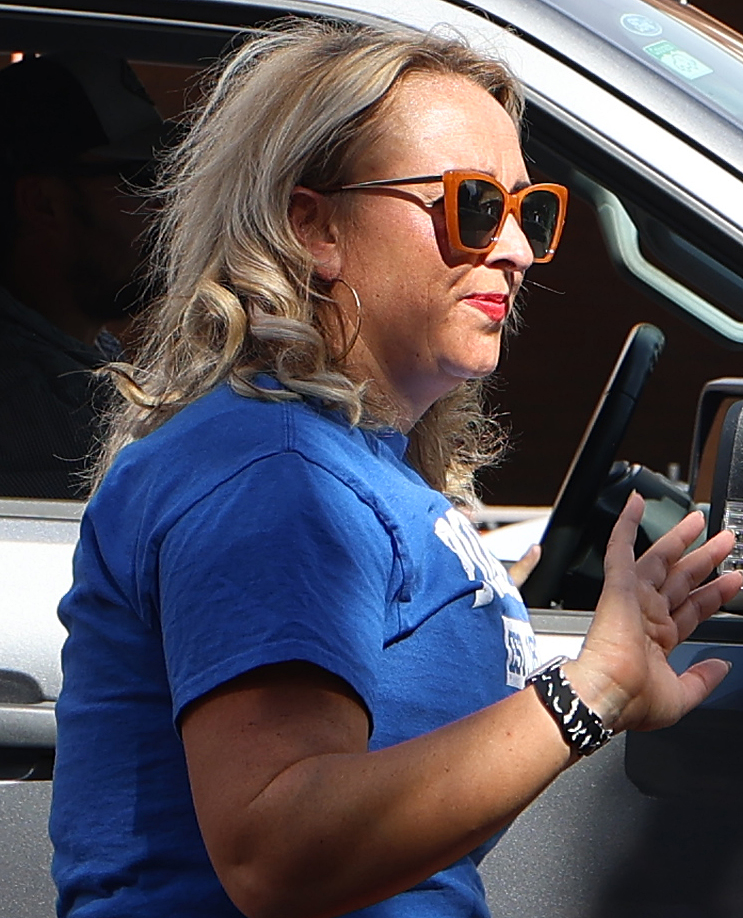

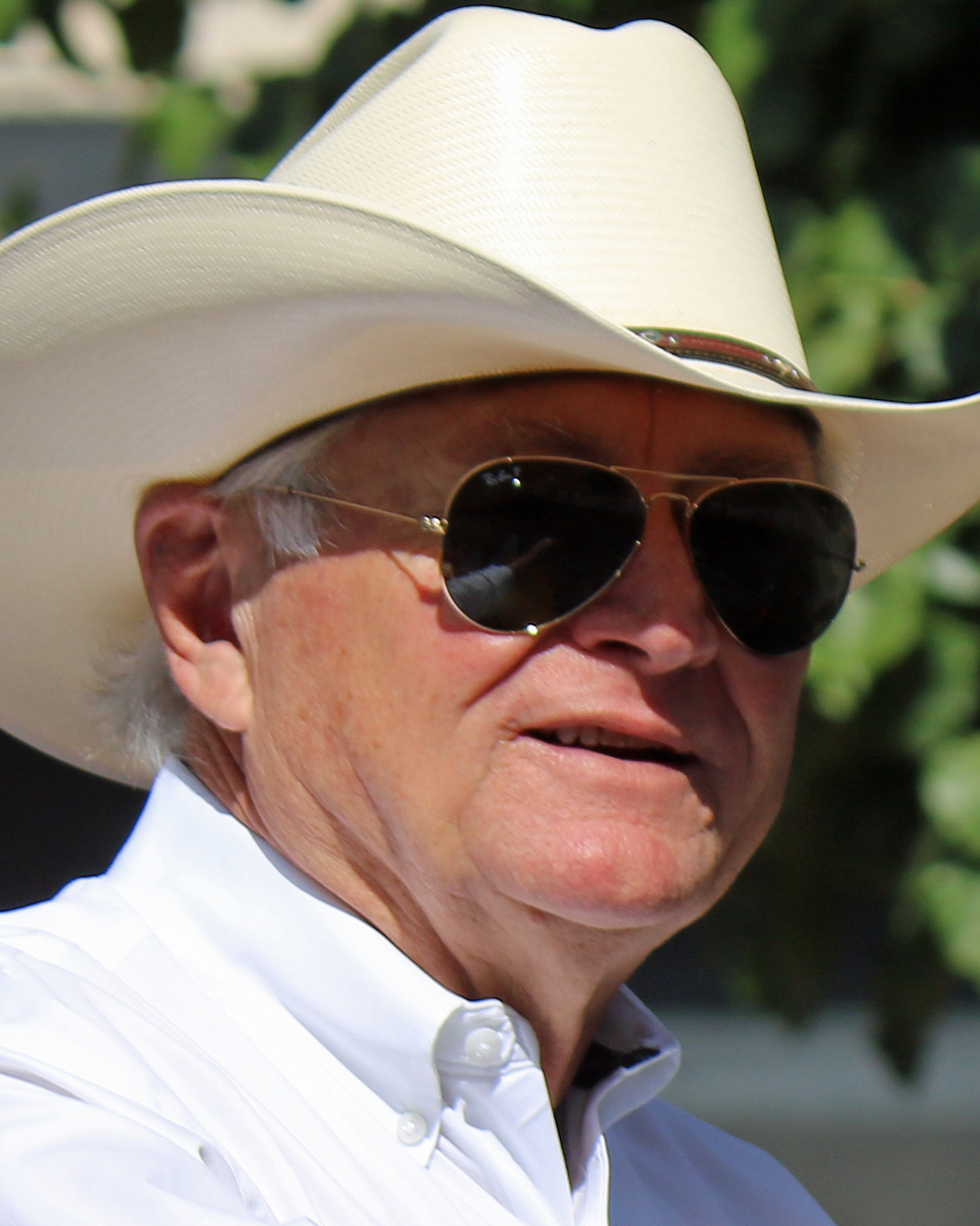

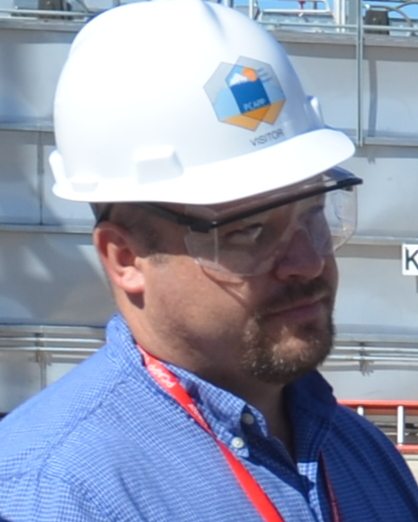
Candidate	Heather Graham	Nick Gradisar	Chris Nicoll
First round	6,073; 22.6%	5,604; 20.8%	3,553; 13.2%
Runoff	15,632; 62.4%	9,427; 37.6%	Eliminated
Candidate	Randy Thurston	Dennis Flores	Regina Maestri
First round	3,290; 12.2%	3,109; 11.6%	1,950; 7.2%
Runoff	Eliminated	Eliminated	Eliminated
Candidate	Larry Atencio
First round	1,933; 7.2%
Runoff	Eliminated
Mayor before election
Nick Gradisar
Democratic
Elected mayor
Heather Graham
Republican

The 2023–24 Pueblo mayoral election was held on November 7, 2023, to elect the mayor of Pueblo, Colorado. Incumbent Democratic mayor Nick Gradisar ran for re-election to a second term in office. Since there was no candidate that received a majority of votes in the initial round of the election, a runoff election was held on January 23, 2024. The election was officially nonpartisan, meaning that party affiliations are not listed on the ballot.

A group collected signatures for a ballot initiative to eliminate the position of mayor and replace it with an unelected city manager. If it had passed, the 2023 mayoral election would have been canceled. Pueblo previously used the council-manager system for nearly a century before switching to a mayor-council system in 2017. The group failed to collect enough signatures. It was discovered that Pueblo City Attorney Dan Kogovsek gave the initiative organizers incorrect information about how many signatures they would need to make the ballot, after which Kogovsek resigned at Gradisar's request.

A total of nine candidates filed to run for mayor. Gradisar and Republican city council president Heather Graham prevailed over a wide field of candidates in the first round, including Republican former city council president Chris Nicoll, Republican former city councilor Randy Thurston, Democratic at-large city councilor Dennis Flores, Republican city councilor Regina Maestri, and Democratic city councilor Larry Atencio. The Republican candidates combined for 55.2% of the vote compared to 42.9% for the Democrats, with the balance going to an independent candidate.

Graham won the runoff in a landslide, unseating Gradisar and becoming Pueblo's first female mayor.

== Candidates ==
=== Declared ===
The following nine candidates made the ballot:

- Larry Atencio, city councilor and candidate for mayor in 2018 (Party affiliation: Democratic)
- Thomas Croshal, retired construction business owner (Party affiliation: Democratic)
- Nick Gradisar, incumbent mayor (Party affiliation: Democratic)
- Dennis Flores, at-large city councilor and candidate for mayor in 2018 (Party affiliation: Democratic)
- Heather Graham, city council president (Party affiliation: Republican)
- Regina Maestri, city councilor (Party affiliation: Republican)
- Chris Nicoll, former city council president and candidate for mayor in 2018 (Party affiliation: Republican)
- Randy Thurston, former city councilor and candidate for mayor in 2018 (Party affiliation: Republican)
- Deryk Trujillo, graphic designer and YouTuber (Party affiliation: Independent)

=== Failed to make ballot ===
- Thomas Martinez, retired steel worker (Party affiliation: Democratic)

=== Withdrew ===
- Samuel Hernandez, food truck business owner (Party affiliation: Republican) (ran for city council)

=== Declined ===
- Mark Aliff, former city councilor (successfully ran for an at-large city council seat)
- Jeff Chostner, district attorney for the 10th Judicial District
- Steve Nawrocki, former city councilor and runner-up for mayor in 2018
- Garrison Ortiz, Pueblo County commissioner
- Lori Winner, city councilor and candidate for mayor in 2018

== First round ==
=== Endorsements ===
Nick Gradisar (D)

Organizations

- Pueblo Firefighters Union
Heather Graham (R)

Organizations

- Pueblo Police Union
Randy Thurston (R)

Statewide officials

- Heidi Ganahl, former at-large member of the University of Colorado Board of Regents
Declined to endorse

Newspapers

- The Pueblo Chieftain

=== Results ===
2023 Pueblo mayoral general election
Candidate	Votes	%
Heather Graham	6,073	22.6
Nick Gradisar (Incumbent)	5,604	20.8
Chris Nicoll	3,553	13.2
Randy Thurston	3,290	12.2
Dennis Flores	3,109	11.6
Regina Maestri	1,950	7.2
Larry Atencio	1,933	7.2
Thomas Croshal	900	3.3
Deryk Trujillo	500	1.9
Total votes	26,912	100.00

== Runoff ==
=== Runoff endorsements ===
Nick Gradisar (D)

U.S. Senators

- Michael Bennet, U.S. Senator from Colorado
- John Hickenlooper, U.S. Senator from Colorado

Statewide officials

- Jared Polis, Governor of Colorado
Heather Graham (R)

County officials

- Zach Swearengin, Pueblo County commissioner

Local officials

- Randy Thurston, former Pueblo city councilor and 2023 mayoral candidate

=== Results ===
2023 Pueblo mayoral runoff
Candidate	Votes	%
Heather Graham	15,632	62.38
Nick Gradisar (Incumbent)	9,427	37.62
Total votes	25,059	100.00

== See also ==
- List of mayors of Pueblo, Colorado
