= 1930 Colorado gubernatorial election =

- November 4, 1930
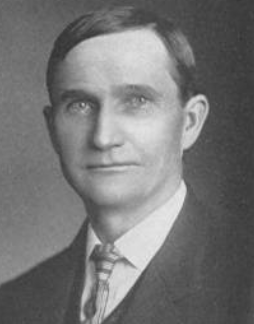

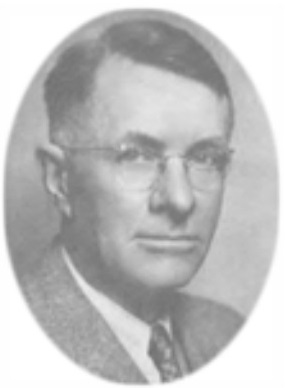
Nominee	Billy Adams	Robert F. Rockwell
Party	Democratic	Republican
Popular vote	197,067	124,164
Percentage	60.41%	38.06%
- County results Adams: 50–60% 60–70% 70–80% Rockwell: 50–60%
Governor before election
Billy Adams
Democratic
Elected Governor
Billy Adams
Democratic

The 1930 Colorado gubernatorial election was held on November 4, 1930. Incumbent Democrat Billy Adams defeated Republican nominee Robert F. Rockwell with 60.41% of the vote.

== Primary elections ==
Primary elections were held on September 9, 1930.

=== Democratic primary ===
==== Candidates ====
- Billy Adams, incumbent Governor

==== Results ====
Democratic primary results
Party	Candidate	Votes	%
Democratic	Billy Adams (incumbent)	44,589	100.00
Total votes		44,589	100.00

=== Republican primary ===
==== Candidates ====
- Robert F. Rockwell, former Lieutenant Governor

==== Results ====
Republican primary results
Party	Candidate	Votes	%
Republican	Robert F. Rockwell	87,223	100.00
Total votes		87,223	100.00

== General election ==
=== Candidates ===
Major party candidates

- Billy Adams, Democratic
- Robert F. Rockwell, Republican

Other candidates

- Claud A. Bushnell, Socialist
- Lizabeth A. Williams, Farmer–Labor
- William R. Dietrich, Communist
- Walter Moore, Independent
- Perry M. Jones, Independent

=== Results ===
1930 Colorado gubernatorial election
Party	Candidate	Votes	%	±%
Democratic	Billy Adams (incumbent)	197,067	60.41%	−6.64%
Republican	Robert F. Rockwell	124,164	38.06%	+6.21%
Socialist	Claud A. Bushnell	2,218	0.68%	+0.16%
Farmer–Labor	Lizabeth A. Williams	1,418	0.44%	+0.10%
Communist	William R. Dietrich	766	0.24%	N/A
Independent	Walter Moore	326	0.10%	N/A
Independent	Perry M. Jones	247	0.08%	N/A
Majority		72,903	22.35%	−12.85%
Turnout		326,206		
Democratic hold		Swing		
