= Governor Carlson =

Governor Carlson may refer to:

- Arne Carlson (born 1934), 37th Governor of Minnesota
- Frank Carlson (1893–1987), 30th Governor of Kansas
- George Alfred Carlson (1876–1926), 20th Governor of Colorado
