= Jared L. Brush Barn =

- Brush, Jared L., Barn
- U.S. National Register of Historic Places
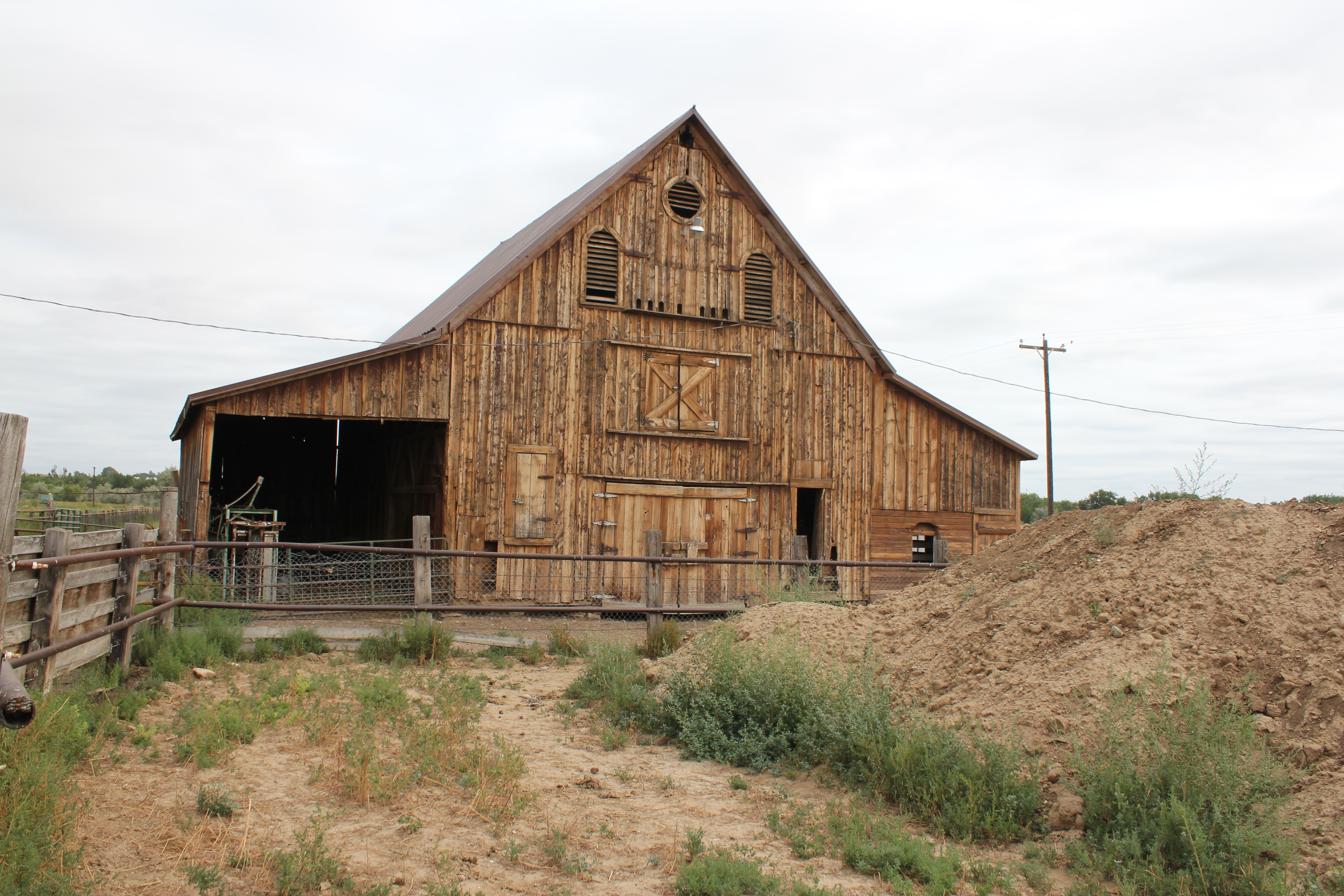
- Barn in 2012.

- Location within Colorado
- Nearest city: Johnstown, Colorado
- Coordinates: 40.35247°N 104.90352°W
- Area: 0.1 acres (0.040 ha)
- Built: 1865
- Architectural style: Vernacular wood frame
- MPS: Historic Farms and Ranches of Weld County MPS
- NRHP reference No.: 91001532
- Added to NRHP: October 16, 1991

The Jared L. Brush Barn, in rural Weld County, Colorado near Johnstown, Colorado, United States, was built c. 1865. It was listed on the National Register of Historic Places in 1991.

The barn is notable for its vertical wood siding and steeply pitched gabled roof, with historic shed-roofed additions on each side of the central bay. Its construction features wood-pegged posts and beams, utilizing native wood and stone, marking it as a rare surviving resource from Colorado's pre-railroad and territorial periods

It is a vernacular wood frame barn erected to store hay and grains by homesteader Jared Lamar Brush.

The barn continues to serve as an integral part of an operating agricultural complex, reflecting the early settlement and agricultural practices in the Big Thompson Valley

It is located at 24308 County Road 17, about 300 yards (270 m) west of the Big Thompson River, and about 1 mile (1.6 km) northeast of the community of Johnstown.
