= 1916 Colorado gubernatorial election =

- November 7, 1916
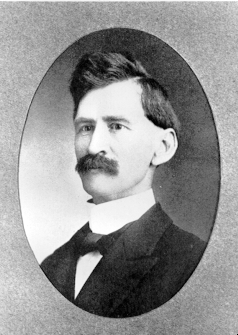

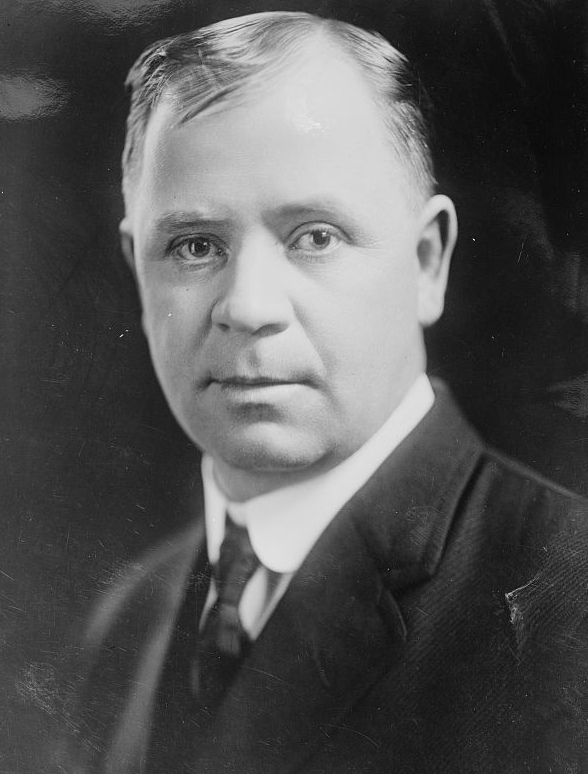
Nominee	Julius Caldeen Gunter	George Alfred Carlson
Party	Democratic	Republican
Popular vote	151,912	117,723
Percentage	53.27%	41.28%
- County results Gunter: 40–50% 50–60% 60–70% Carlson: 40–50% 50–60% Leeder: 30–40%
Governor before election
George Alfred Carlson
Republican
Elected Governor
Julius Caldeen Gunter
Democratic

The 1916 Colorado gubernatorial election was held on November 7, 1916. Democratic nominee Julius Caldeen Gunter defeated Republican incumbent George Alfred Carlson with 53.27% of the vote.

== Primary elections ==
Primary elections were held on September 12, 1916.

=== Democratic primary ===
==== Candidates ====
- Julius Caldeen Gunter, former associate justice of the Colorado Supreme Court

==== Results ====
Democratic primary results
Party	Candidate	Votes	%
Democratic	Julius Caldeen Gunter	39,569	100.00
Total votes		39,569	100.00

=== Republican primary ===
==== Candidates ====
- George Alfred Carlson, incumbent governor
- Samuel D. Nicholson, former mayor of Leadville

==== Results ====
Republican primary results
Party	Candidate	Votes	%
Republican	George Alfred Carlson (incumbent)	42,003	
Republican	Samuel D. Nicholson	38,878	
Total votes			

== General election ==
=== Candidates ===
Major party candidates

- Julius Caldeen Gunter, Democratic
- George Alfred Carlson, Republican

Other candidates

- C. Goddard, Socialist
- Louis E. Leeder, Independent

=== Results ===
1916 Colorado gubernatorial election
Party	Candidate	Votes	%	±%
Democratic	Julius Caldeen Gunter	151,912	53.27%	+19.10%
Republican	George Alfred Carlson (incumbent)	117,723	41.28%	−7.39%
Socialist	C. Goddard	12,495	4.38%	+0.41%
Independent	Louis E. Leeder	3,025	1.06%	N/A
Majority		34,189	11.99%	
Turnout		285,155		
Democratic gain from Republican		Swing		
