= James Bradley Orman =

American politician (1849–1919)

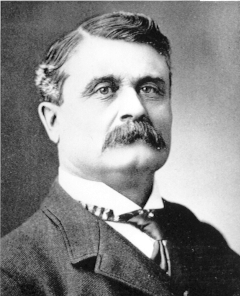

12th Governor of Colorado
- In office January 8, 1901 – January 13, 1903
- Lieutenant: David Courtney Coates; Warren A. Haggott
- Preceded by: Charles S. Thomas
- Succeeded by: James H. Peabody

Personal details
- Born: November 4, 1849 Muscatine, Iowa, United States
- Died: July 21, 1919 (aged 69) Denver, Colorado, United States
- Party: Democratic
- Spouse: Nellie Martin Orman
- Children: 2

James Bradley Orman (November 4, 1849 – July 21, 1919) was an American politician and railroad builder. He served as the 12th governor of Colorado from 1901 to 1903. He was a Democrat.

== Life and career ==
Orman was born in Muscatine, Iowa and grew up on his family's farm there. In 1869, he moved to Colorado at the age of 20, along with his brother William. The brothers soon started a construction company which, though it did a variety of projects, was most famous for building railroads, particularly in Colorado and Kansas.

James Orman moved to Pueblo, Colorado in 1874, and soon entered politics. He was elected to several terms in the Colorado state legislature and the Pueblo city council, and he served as mayor of Pueblo from 1897 to 1898. In 1883 the state democratic party nominated him to the United States Senate, but the state legislature, which chose senators at that time, elected Thomas M. Bowen over James Orman by three votes.

Orman became the Democratic nominee for governor in 1900. Though Colorado was generally a Republican state, the Republican Party was divided over the free silver controversy, and the United States Populist Party, though in decline, was still a prominent third party in Colorado. When the Silver Republicans and populists endorsed Orman, he was elected easily.

The greatest problem during his administration was a dispute between miners and a mining company. On May 1, 1901, 350 miners led by Vincent Saint John, and organized by the Western Federation of Miners, walked away from their jobs at the Smuggler-Union mine in Telluride. Their walkout was a protest of a new method of payment, called "contracting", or "fathoms", which could sometimes result in a miner doing thirty days' worth of digging, and getting paid nothing for the work. But the contract system was worse than that; if the miner received no pay due to failing to perform according to the contract, then he owed money to the company for tools and powder.

A shooting war was triggered when one of the strikers, believed to have been unarmed, had been shot through the throat by a deputized mine guard. In spite of intense pressure from others, Lieutenant Governor David C. Coates helped to persuade Governor Orman not to send the Colorado National Guard. Coates volunteered to mediate, and he was dispatched by the governor to be part of a commission sent to Telluride to investigate the issues that caused the walkout. Vincent St. John and mine operator Arthur L. Collins finally met across the table, and the commission was able to effect a settlement between the miners and the company, resulting in more than a year of labor peace in San Miguel County's silver mines.

Orman served one two-year term, as most Colorado governors did at that time. After his term as governor he moved back to Pueblo and retired from politics, but was active in business. Following his death, he was buried in Pueblo.

In 1901, in response to thousands of requests, Orman commuted the sentence of Edward O'Kelley, who had killed Robert Ford, the man who murdered outlaw Jesse James.

Orman was married to Nellie Martin from 1876 until her death in 1918. They had two children, Frederick and Edna.

He left office on 13 January 1903 and returned to his various businesses, serving as Receiver of the United States Land Office. He died on 21 July 1919 and is buried in Pueblo.

== See also ==
- List of mayors of Pueblo, Colorado

== Bibliography ==
- Martin, MaryJoy (2004). The Corpse On Boomerang Road, Telluride's War On Labor 1899-1908. Western Reflections Pub. p. 377. ISBN 9781932738025.

Party political offices
Preceded by Charles S. Thomas	Democratic nominee for Governor of Colorado; 1900	Succeeded by E. C. Stimson
Political offices
Preceded by Charles Spalding Thomas	Governor of Colorado; 1901–1903	Succeeded by James Hamilton Peabody
