= 1922 Colorado gubernatorial election =

- November 7, 1922
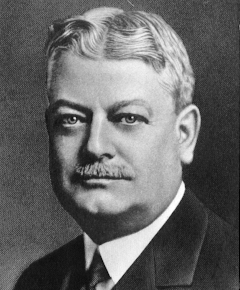

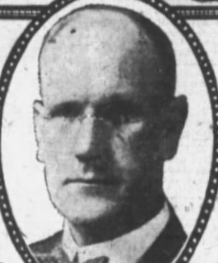
Nominee	William Ellery Sweet	Benjamin Griffith
Party	Democratic	Republican
Popular vote	138,098	134,353
Percentage	49.64%	48.29%
- County results Sweet: 40–50% 50–60% 60–70% Griffith: 40–50% 50–60% 60–70%
Governor before election
Oliver Henry Shoup
Republican
Elected Governor
William Ellery Sweet
Democratic

The 1922 Colorado gubernatorial election was held on November 7, 1922. Democratic nominee William Ellery Sweet defeated Republican nominee Benjamin Griffith with 49.64% of the vote.

== Primary elections ==
Primary elections were held on September 12, 1922.

=== Democratic primary ===
==== Candidates ====
- William Ellery Sweet, businessman
- Fred A. Sabin
- Benjamin L. Jefferson

==== Results ====
Democratic primary results
Party	Candidate	Votes	%
Democratic	William Ellery Sweet	36,593	56.0
Democratic	Fred A. Sabin	21,255	32.5
Democratic	Benjamin L. Jefferson	7,471	11.4
Total votes		65,319	100.0

=== Republican primary ===
==== Candidates ====
- Benjamin Griffith, former Colorado Attorney General
- Earl Cooley, incumbent Lieutenant Governor

==== Results ====
Republican primary results
Party	Candidate	Votes	%
Republican	Benjamin Griffith	31,244	61.1
Republican	Earl Cooley	19,857	38.9
Total votes		51,101	100.0

== General election ==
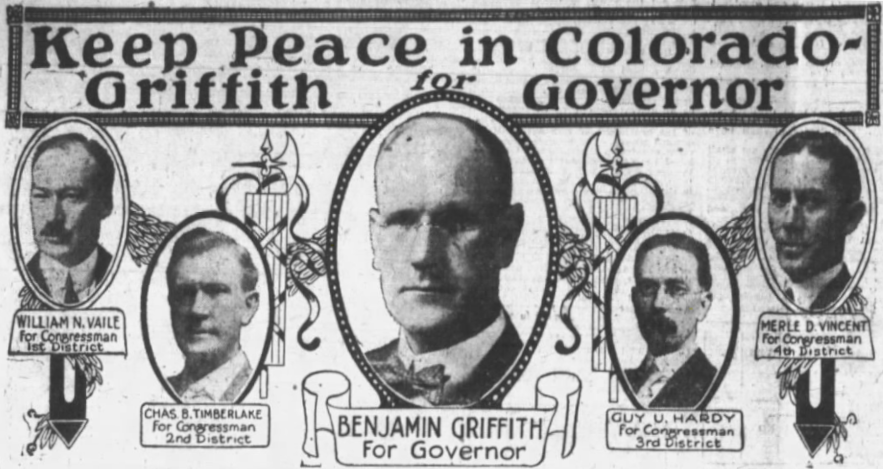
An ad for the Republican ticket in the 1922 state election. Gubernatorial nominee Benjamin Griffith is front and center.

=== Candidates ===
Major party candidates

- William Ellery Sweet, Democratic
- Benjamin Griffith, Republican

Other candidates

- Lauren E. Arnold, Socialist
- G.F. Stevens, Farmer–Labor
- Barney Haughey, Independent

=== Results ===
1922 Colorado gubernatorial election
Party	Candidate	Votes	%	±%
Democratic	William Ellery Sweet	138,098	49.64%	+12.53%
Republican	Benjamin Griffith	134,353	48.29%	−11.26%
Socialist	Lauren E. Arnold	2,283	0.82%	
Farmer–Labor	G.F. Stevens	2,030	0.73%	−2.62%
Independent	Barney Haughey	1,445	0.52%	N/A
Majority		3,745	1.35%	
Turnout		278,209		
Democratic gain from Republican		Swing		
