= William H. Meyer (Colorado politician) =

American politician

3rd Lieutenant Governor of Colorado
- In office January 9, 1883 – January 13, 1885
- Governor: James Benton Grant
- Preceded by: Horace Austin Warner Tabor
- Succeeded by: Peter W. Breene

Personal details
- Born: April 14, 1847; Hanover, German Empire
- Died: August 22, 1923 (aged 76); Costilla County, Colorado
- Political party: Republican

William H. Meyer (April 14, 1847 – August 22, 1923) was the third Lieutenant Governor of Colorado, serving from 1883 to 1885 under James Benton Grant.

Party political offices
Preceded by Benjamin Harrison Eaton	Republican nominee for Governor of Colorado; 1886	Succeeded by Job Adams Cooper
Political offices
Preceded by Horace Tabor	Lieutenant Governor of Colorado; 1883–1885	Succeeded by Peter W. Breene
