= Benjamin F. Montgomery =

American politician (1834–1912)

Lieutenant Governor-elect of Colorado
- Governor: Elias M. Ammons
- Died before taking office

Personal details
- Born: 1834 Denver, Colorado, US
- Died: December 29, 1912 (aged 77–78) Colorado Springs, Colorado, US
- Party: Democratic
- Children: Willis Saxe Montgomery (1857 – 1944); Editha Montgomery (1896 – 1897)
- Occupation: Politician

Benjamin Franklin Montgomery (1834 – December 29, 1912) was an American politician elected lieutenant governor of Colorado in 1912, but died before he could take office.

== Life and career ==
Benjamin F. Montgomery was born in 1834, in Denver, Colorado. He became interested in mining and ranching. For four years, during the boom days of Cripple Creek, then in El Paso County, he lived in that town and during that time he represented El Paso County in the legislature. He was prominent in the councils of the local Democratic Party during his residence there.

== Death and aftermath ==
In his later years, he lived on a farm near Rifle, Colorado, with his son.

Less than two months after his election as lieutenant governor, Montgomery died on December 29, 1912, of laryngitis. Funeral services were held in Denver and he was buried at Evergreen Cemetery in Colorado Springs.

After Montgomery's death, Stephen R. Fitzgarrald was appointed as his successor by the newly elected governor, Elias M. Ammons. Fitzgarrald had served as lieutenant governor since 1909 and had not sought re-election, but agreed to take Montgomery's place, serving out his term until it expired in 1915.
