= Julius Caldeen Gunter =

American politician (1858–1940)

Julius C. Gunter
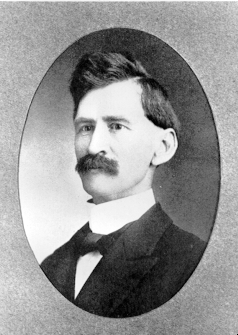

21st Governor of Colorado
- In office January 9, 1917 – January 14, 1919
- Lieutenant: James A. Pulliam
- Preceded by: George A. Carlson
- Succeeded by: Oliver H. Shoup

Personal details
- Born: October 31, 1858 Fayetteville, Arkansas, U.S.
- Died: October 26, 1940 (aged 81) Denver, Colorado, U.S.
- Party: Democratic
- Spouse: Elizabeth Brown
- Profession: Governor

Julius Caldeen Gunter (October 31, 1858 – October 26, 1940) was the 21st governor of Colorado from January 9, 1917, until his term ended on January 14, 1919.

He was born in Fayetteville, Arkansas, to Col. Thomas M. Gunter and Marcella Jackson Gunter who died just weeks after his birth. He earned a LL.D Degree when he graduated from the University of Virginia in 1879. His first major political job was being elected to the Colorado Supreme Court which he served on between 1905 and 1907. In 1916, he entered the Colorado gubernatorial election, and was elected on November 7. The same year he entered office, the United States entered World War I. Gunter helped organize the Colorado Home Guard, the Colorado Wartime Council, and the Council of Defense which were to aid the troops. He was also the first Governor to implement the use of the National Guard. His term ended the same year the war ended. Gunter lost renomination for a second term in Colorado's 1918 Democratic primary. He later declined offers to return to the Colorado Supreme Court. He died in his home in Denver, Colorado on October 26, 1940, just shy of his 82nd birthday, and was buried in Fairmount Cemetery, Denver.

Party political offices
| Preceded by Thomas M. Patterson | Democratic nominee for Governor of Colorado; 1916 | Succeeded by Thomas J. Tynan |
Political offices
| Preceded by George Alfred Carlson | Governor of Colorado; 1917–1919 | Succeeded by Oliver Henry Shoup |
