= List of mayors of Pueblo, Colorado =

The following is a list of mayors of the city of Pueblo, Colorado, United States.

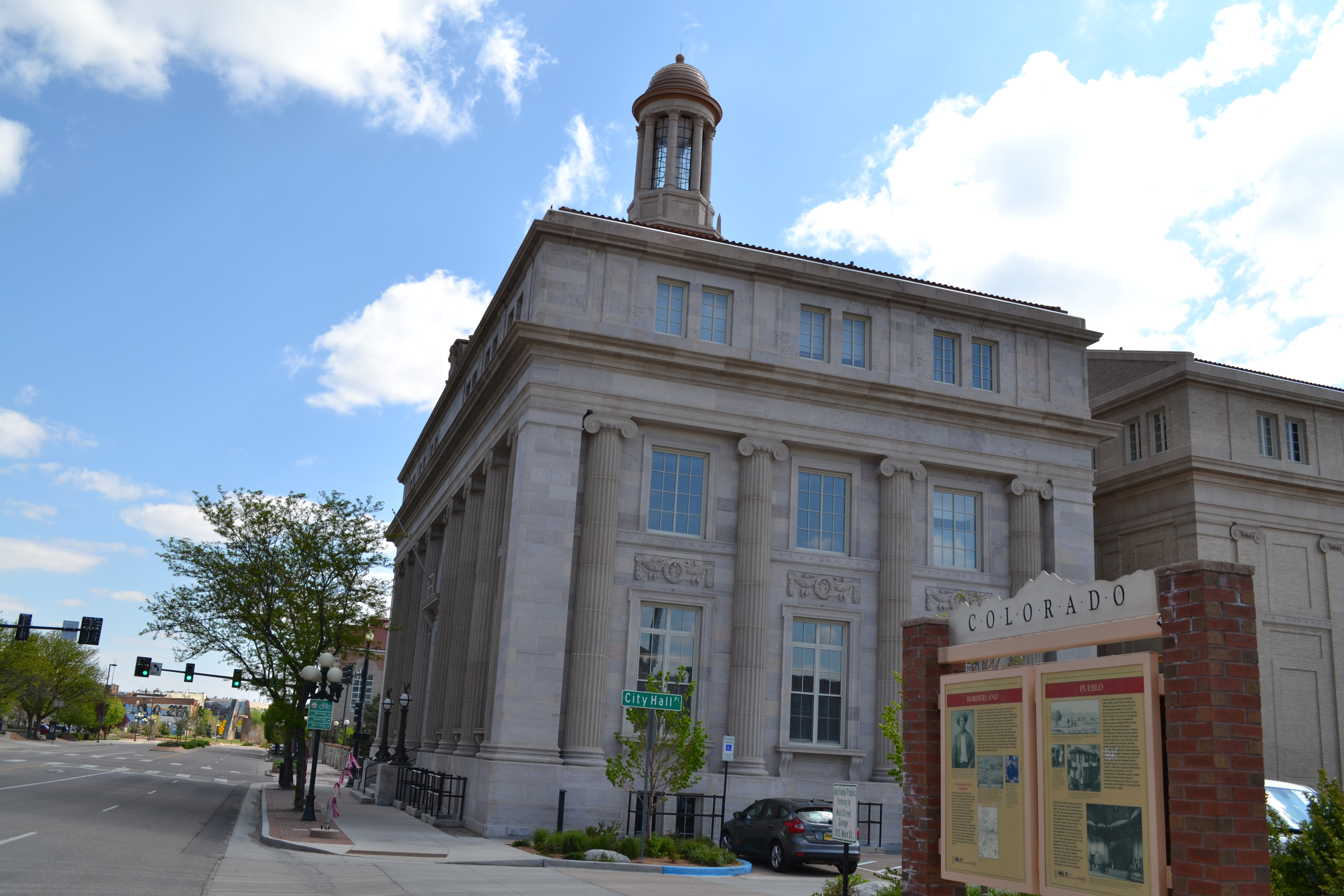
Pueblo City Hall, built in 1919 (photo 2019)

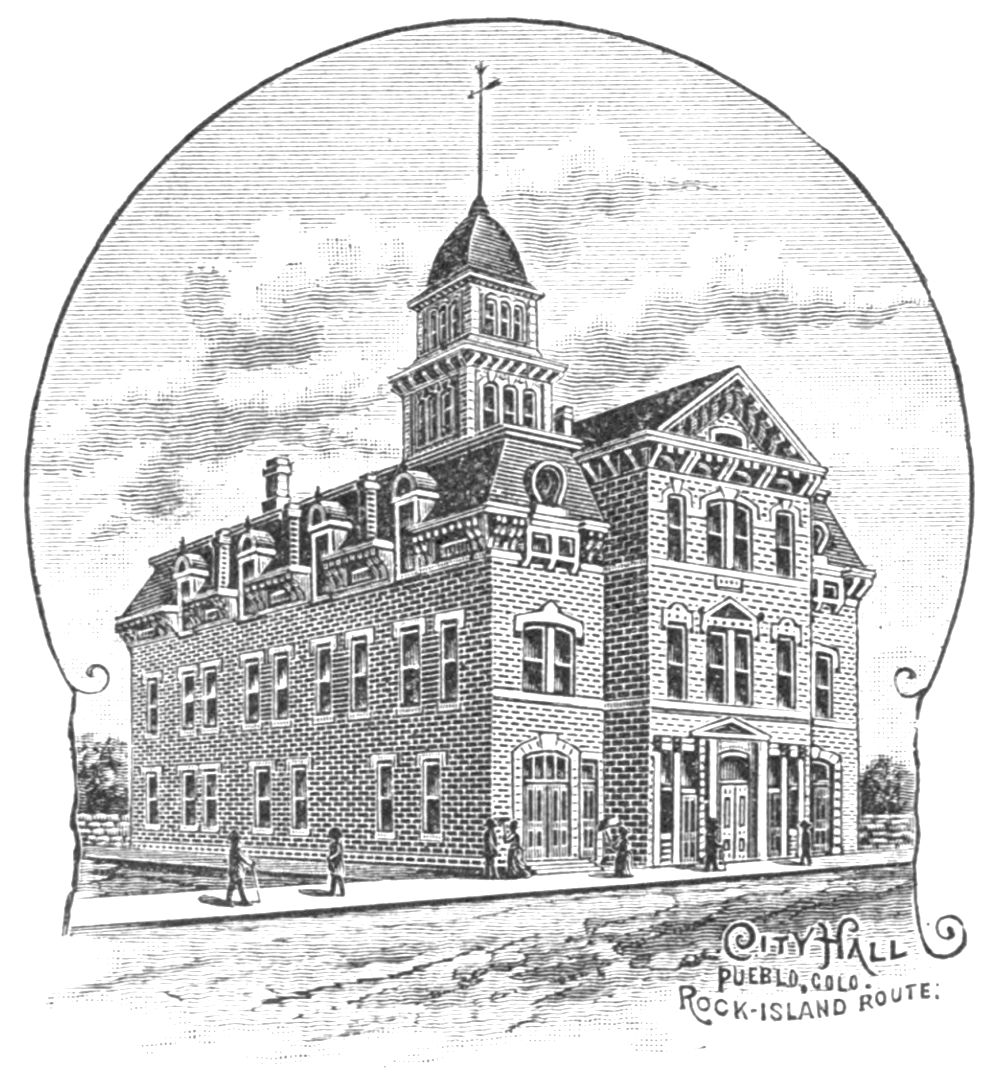
City hall in Pueblo, circa 1890

- J.R. Lowther, c.1877
- M.D. Thatcher, c.1878
- George Quinby Richmond, c.1880
- James Rice, c.1881
- John H. Warneke, c.1884
- Delos L. Holden, 1886
- Charles Henkel, 1887, 1890
- Andrew Royal, 1888
- Andrew A. Grome, 1889
- W.B. Hamilton, 1891–1892
- L.B. Strait, 1893–1894
- A.T. King, c.1895–1896
- James Bradley Orman, 1897–1899
- George F. West, 1899–1901
- J.E. Rizer, 1902
- Benjamin B. Brown, 1902–1905
- John T. West, 1905–1909
- N. Studzinski, c.1919
- James Lovern, c.1921
- William L. Warner, c.1951
- Marion F. Hunter, c.1952
- Carl D. Bryan, c.1953–1954
- Nick Gradisar, 2019–2023
- Heather Graham, 2024–present

== See also ==
- 2023–24 Pueblo mayoral election
- Pueblo history
