= Lora Webb Nichols =

American photographer and diarist (1883–1962)

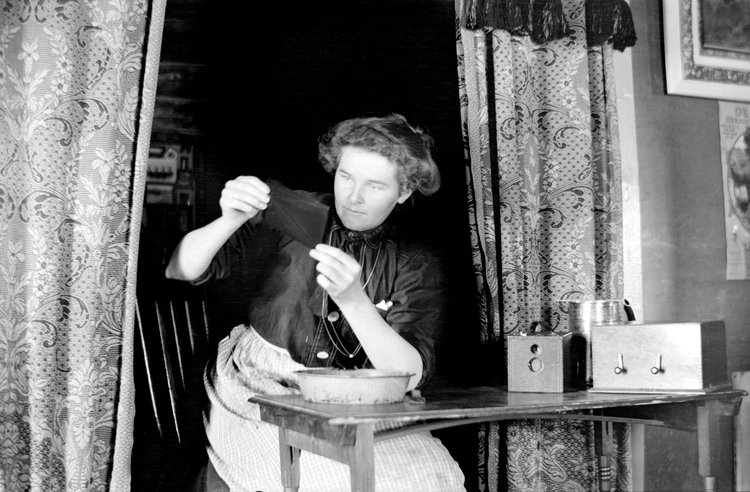
A 1909 portrait of Lora Webb Nichols

Lora Webb Nichols (1883–1962) was an American photographer and diarist.

== Early life and education ==
Nichols was born in Boulder, Colorado. Her grandfather was Colorado Lieutenant Governor David H. Nichols. She moved with her family to Encampment, Wyoming.

== Life and work ==
Nichols began photographing in 1899 at age 16. Lucy Davies, writing in The Daily Telegraph, described her work as recording Wyoming's "inconsequential chores and rituals (washing, shovelling snow, braiding hair) rather than grand events. Even so, her frank, bold pictures capture the clean-cut thrill of pioneer life, of America's hugeness and scope." Around 1905, Nichols built a darkroom and worked as a photographer and a photo finisher. In 1925, she founded three businesses in Encampment: the Rocky Mountain Studio which developed film and loaned cameras; The Encampment Echo newspaper; and The Sugar Bowl, selling soda and ice cream. When cowboys and young men in the Civilian Conservation Corps passed through town, Nichols would loan them a camera and ask them to return with photographs. These images represent about a third of her archive.

In 1935, she moved to Stockton, California and worked in a children's home, eventually becoming its director. She returned to Encampment in 1956, where she died in 1962.

== Personal life ==
She had six children.

== Legacy ==
There are 24,000 photographs in Nichols' archive, 16,000 of them taken by her, held at the American Heritage Center of the University of Wyoming. That archive also includes a manuscript for her unfinished memoir, I Remember: a Girl's Eye View of Early Days in the Rocky Mountains. Her diaries and other photographs are held at Grand Encampment Museum in Encampment.

== Publications ==
- Encampment, Wyoming: Selections from the Lora Webb Nichols Archive 1899–1948. Amsterdam: Fw, 2020. Edited by Nicole Jean Hill. ISBN 978-94-90119-89-8. With essays by Nancy F. Anderson and Hill.
  - Amsterdam: Fw, 2021.
