= 1928 Colorado gubernatorial election =

- November 6, 1928
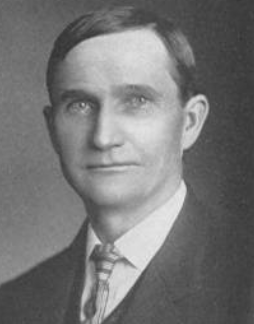

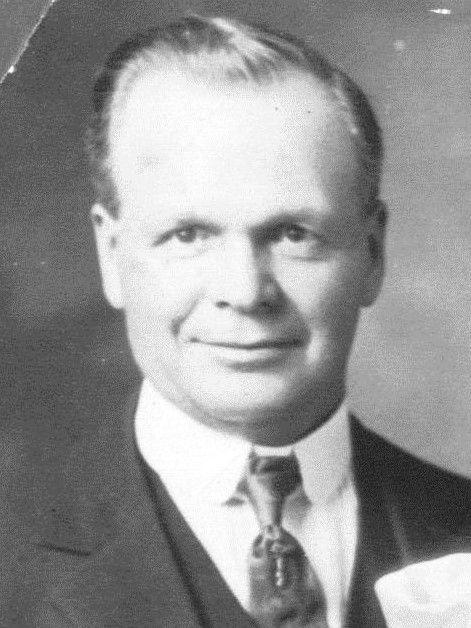
| Nominee | Billy Adams | William L. Boatright |
| Party | Democratic | Republican |
| Popular vote | 240,160 | 114,067 |
| Percentage | 67.05% | 31.85% |
- County results Adams: 50–60% 60–70% 70–80% Boatright: 40–50% 50–60%
Governor before election
Billy Adams
Democratic
Elected Governor
Billy Adams
Democratic

The 1928 Colorado gubernatorial election was held on November 6, 1928. Incumbent Democrat Billy Adams defeated Republican nominee William L. Boatright with 67.05% of the vote.

== Primary elections ==
Primary elections were held on September 11, 1928.

=== Democratic primary ===
==== Candidates ====
- Billy Adams, incumbent Governor

==== Results ====
Democratic primary results
| Party | Candidate | Votes | % |
|---|---|---|---|
| Democratic | Billy Adams (incumbent) | 42,937 | 100.00 |
| Total votes | | 42,937 | 100.00 |

=== Republican primary ===
==== Candidates ====
- William L. Boatright, Colorado Attorney General
- Clarence P. Dodge, newspaper publisher

==== Results ====
Republican primary results
| Party | Candidate | Votes | % |
|---|---|---|---|
| Republican | William L. Boatright | 51,530 | 63.4% |
| Republican | Clarence P. Dodge | 29,693 | 36.6% |
| Total votes | | 81,223 | |

== General election ==
=== Candidates ===
Major party candidates

- Billy Adams, Democratic
- William L. Boatright, Republican

Other candidates

- Samuel A. Garth, Socialist
- Vera Jane Pease, Farmer–Labor
- George J. Saul, Workers

=== Results ===
1928 Colorado gubernatorial election
| Party | Candidate | Votes | % | ±% |
|---|---|---|---|---|
| Democratic | Billy Adams (incumbent) | 240,160 | 67.05% | +7.21% |
| Republican | William L. Boatright | 114,067 | 31.85% | −6.26% |
| Socialist | Samuel A. Garth | 1,873 | 0.52% | +0.03% |
| Farmer–Labor | Vera Jane Pease | 1,233 | 0.34% | −0.96% |
| Workers | George J. Saul | 852 | 0.24% | +0.05% |
| Majority | | 126,093 | 35.20% | +13.47% |
| Turnout | | 358,185 | | |
| Democratic hold | | Swing | | |
