= Norman H. Meldrum =

American politician

5th Lieutenant Governor of Colorado
- In office January 11, 1887 – January 8, 1889
- Governor: Alva Adams
- Preceded by: Peter W. Breene
- Succeeded by: William Grover Smith

Secretary of State of Colorado
- In office 1879–1883
- Governor: Frederick Walker Pitkin
- Preceded by: William Clark
- Succeeded by: Melvin Edwards

Personal details
- Born: October 11, 1841; Caledonia, New York
- Died: February 11, 1920 (aged 78); Denver, Colorado
- Political party: Republican

Norman H. Meldrum (October 11, 1841 – February 11, 1920) was the fifth Lieutenant Governor of Colorado, serving from 1887 to 1889 under Alva Adams. He had previously served in the American Civil War guarding the construction of the Union Pacific Railroad. He also was the Secretary of State of Colorado from 1879 to 1883. As lieutenant governor Meldrum introduced the legislation for the founding of Colorado State University. He was born in Caledonia, New York and died in Denver, Colorado.

Political offices
Preceded by William Clark	Secretary of State of Colorado; 1879–1883	Succeeded by Melvin Edwards
Preceded by Peter W. Breene	Lieutenant Governor of Colorado; 1887–1889	Succeeded by William G. Smith
