= Billy Adams (politician) =

American politician from Colorado

William Herbert Adams
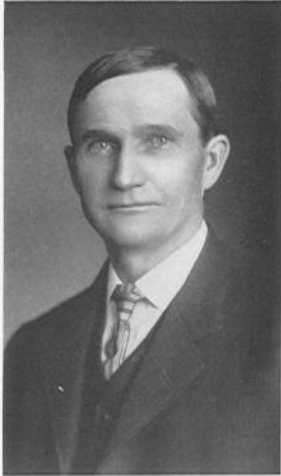

25th Governor of Colorado
- In office January 11, 1927 – January 10, 1933
- Lieutenant: George Milton Corlett; Edwin C. Johnson
- Preceded by: Clarence Morley
- Succeeded by: Edwin C. Johnson

Personal details
- Born: February 15, 1861 Blue Mounds, Wisconsin, U.S.
- Died: February 4, 1954 (aged 92) Alamosa, Colorado, U.S.
- Resting place: Alamosa, Colorado
- Party: Democratic

William Herbert Adams (February 15, 1861 – February 4, 1954) was an American politician who served as the 25th governor of the state of Colorado, from 1927 until 1933.

== Biography ==
Adams was born in Blue Mounds, Wisconsin. In 1878, when he was 17, Adams moved to Alamosa, Colorado. He was later elected to City Treasurer, then Mayor of Alamosa, and later as Conejos County commissioner. In 1886, he was elected to the Colorado General Assembly as a member of the Colorado House of Representatives. In 1888, he was elected to the Colorado Senate where he served until 1926, when he was elected as Governor of Colorado. The centennial historian of the state, Marshall Sprague, summarized Billy Adams as "a cheerful, outgoing, bowlegged cowboy."

In 1921, during his term as Colorado Senate Senator, Adams received approval on a bill that formed Alamosa State Normal School in Alamosa, Colorado. The college’s name was later changed to Adams State Teachers College in honor of its founder and finally to its present name Adams State University. Adams died on February 4, 1954, in Alamosa, Colorado, at the age of ninety-two, where he is buried.

== Personal life ==
John Adams, Billy's father, was a member of the Wisconsin State Assembly and the Wisconsin State Senate. Billy’s older brother, Alva Adams, was also governor of Colorado from 1887 to 1889, from 1897 to 1899, and 1905. Billy's nephew, Alva Blanchard Adams, was a United States Senator from Colorado from 1923 until 1925 and from 1933 to 1941.

Adams married twice. First to Emma Ottaway, and later to Hattie D. Mullins.

== See also ==
- Governor of Colorado
- List of governors of Colorado

Party political offices
Preceded by William Ellery Sweet	Democratic nominee for Governor of Colorado; 1926, 1928, 1930	Succeeded by Edwin C. Johnson
Political offices
Preceded by Clarence Morley	Governor of Colorado; 1927–1933	Succeeded by Edwin C. Johnson
