= 1914 Colorado gubernatorial election =

- November 3, 1914
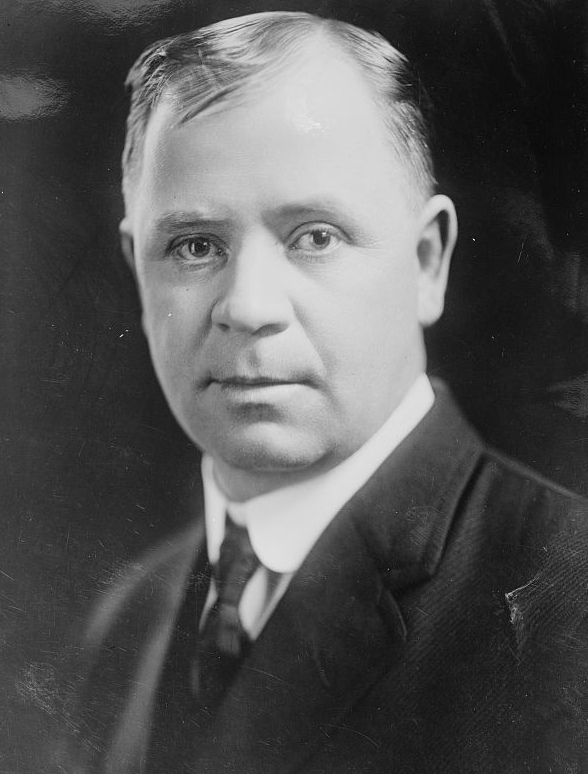

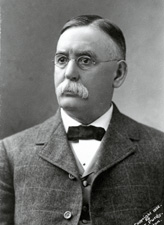

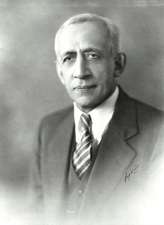
Nominee	George Alfred Carlson	Thomas M. Patterson	Edward P. Costigan
Party	Republican	Democratic	Progressive
Popular vote	129,096	90,640	32,920
Percentage	48.67%	34.17%	12.41%
- County results Carlson: 40–50% 50–60% 60–70% Patterson: 40–50% 50–60%
Governor before election
Elias M. Ammons
Democratic
Elected Governor
George Alfred Carlson
Republican

The 1914 Colorado gubernatorial election was held on November 3, 1914. Republican nominee George Alfred Carlson defeated Democratic nominee Thomas M. Patterson with 48.67% of the vote.

== Primary elections ==
Primary elections were held on September 8, 1914.

=== Democratic primary ===
==== Candidates ====
- Thomas M. Patterson, former United States Senator
- Barnette T. Napier

==== Results ====
Democratic primary results
Party	Candidate	Votes	%
Democratic	Thomas M. Patterson	29,638	
Democratic	Barnette T. Napier	16,194	
Total votes			

=== Republican primary ===
==== Candidates ====
- George Alfred Carlson, Fort Collins District Attorney
- Samuel D. Nicholson, former Mayor of Leadville
- Frank C. Goudy, Denver District Attorney

==== Results ====
Republican primary results
Party	Candidate	Votes	%
Republican	George Alfred Carlson	16,963	
Republican	Samuel D. Nicholson	15,264	
Republican	Frank C. Goudy	10,862	
Total votes			

== General election ==
=== Candidates ===
Major party candidates

- George Alfred Carlson, Republican
- Thomas M. Patterson, Democratic

Other candidates

- Edward P. Costigan, Progressive
- Abraham Marions, Socialist
- L. D. Hosman, Socialist Labor

=== Results ===
1914 Colorado gubernatorial election
Party	Candidate	Votes	%	±%
Republican	George Alfred Carlson	129,096	48.67%	+24.96%
Democratic	Thomas M. Patterson	90,640	34.17%	−8.74%
Progressive	Edward P. Costigan	32,920	12.41%	−12.47%
Socialist	Abraham Marions	10,516	3.97%	−2.12%
Socialist Labor	L. D. Hosman	2,067	0.78%	+0.61%
Majority		38,456	14.50%	
Turnout		265,239		
Republican gain from Democratic		Swing		
