= Peter W. Breene =

American politician (1846–1926)

Peter W. Breene was the fourth Lieutenant Governor of Colorado. He was a Republican and served from 1885 to 1887 under Governor Benjamin Harrison Eaton.

Breene was born in August, 1846 in Kilkenny, Leinster, Ireland. He immigrated to Indiana and became a miner. He moved to Leadville, Colorado in 1877 and amassed a fortune in mining. He became an organizer and leader among the miners. He served in the Colorado House of Representatives (1883–1885), as lieutenant governor from 1885 to 1887, and as the Colorado State Treasurer from 1887 to 1889. He died December 24, 1926, in Leadville.

Political offices
Preceded by William H. Meyer	Lieutenant Governor of Colorado; 1885–1887	Succeeded by Norman H. Meldrum
