= Maher, Colorado =

Unincorporated community in Montrose County, CO, USA

- Unincorporated community
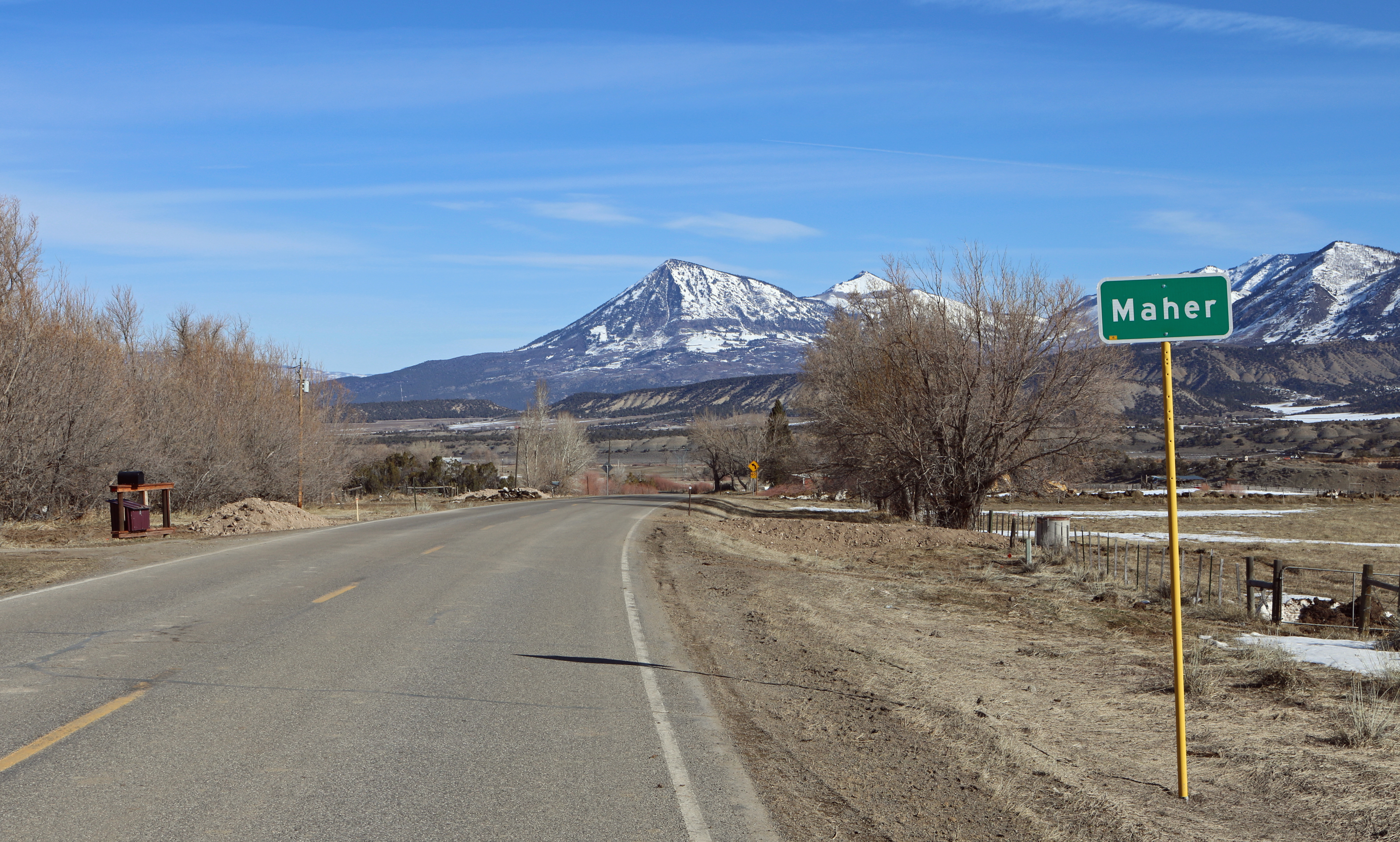
- Maher in 2016, with Mount Lamborn in the distance

- Location within Colorado Location within the United States
- Coordinates: 38°38′42″N 107°35′05″W
- Country: United States
- State: Colorado
- Counties: Montrose
- Elevation: 6,808 ft (2,075 m)
- Time zone: UTC-7 (MST)
  - Summer (DST): UTC-6 (MDT)
- ZIP code: 81415 (Crawford)
- Area code: 970
- GNIS feature ID: 186732

Maher is an unincorporated community located in Montrose County, Colorado, United States. The U.S. Post Office at Crawford (ZIP Code 81415) now serves Maher postal addresses.
