= 1886 Colorado gubernatorial election =

- November 2, 1886
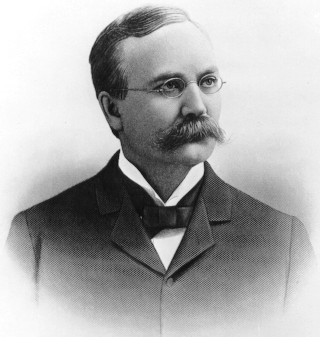

Nominee	Alva Adams	William H. Meyer
Party	Democratic	Republican
Popular vote	29,234	26,816
Percentage	49.66%	45.55%
- County results Adams: 40–50% 50–60% 60–70% Meyer: 40–50% 50–60% 70–80%
Governor before election
Benjamin Harrison Eaton
Republican
Elected Governor
Alva Adams
Democratic

The 1886 Colorado gubernatorial election was held on November 2, 1886. Democratic nominee Alva Adams defeated Republican nominee William H. Meyer with 49.66% of the vote.

== General election ==
=== Candidates ===
Major party candidates

- Alva Adams, Democratic
- William H. Meyer, Republican

Other candidates

- William H. Fishback, Prohibition

=== Results ===
1886 Colorado gubernatorial election
Party	Candidate	Votes	%	±%
Democratic	Alva Adams	29,234	49.66%	+3.57%
Republican	William H. Meyer	26,816	45.55%	−5.19%
Prohibition	William H. Fishback	2,710	4.60%	N/A
Majority		2,418	4.11%	
Turnout		58,760		
Democratic gain from Republican		Swing		

==== By county ====
County	Adams %	Adams #	Meyer %	Meyer #	Fishback %	Fishback #	Total
Arapahoe	46.63%	5,132	48.48%	5,335	4.88%	537	11,004
Archuleta	49.65%	72	50.34%	73	0.00%	0	145
Bent	67.53%	568	32.46%	273	0.00%	0	841
Boulder	53.48%	1,220	30.86%	704	15.65%	357	2,281
Chaffee	49.91%	924	48.83%	904	1.23%	23	1,851
Clear Creek	40.54%	740	52.98%	967	6.46%	118	1,825
Conejos	61.09%	713	38.81%	453	0.08%	1	1,167
Costilla	27.91%	194	72.08%	501	0.00%	0	695
Custer	37.85%	391	52.56%	543	9.58%	99	1,033
Delta	59.07%	231	40.40%	158	0.51%	2	391
Dolores	43.65%	86	56.34%	111	0.00%	0	197
Douglas	47.50%	219	50.97%	235	1.51%	7	461
Eagle	48.57%	359	50.87%	376	0.54%	4	739
El Paso	40.30%	611	49.14%	745	10.55%	160	1,516
Elbert	47.51%	210	49.09%	217	3.39%	15	442
Fremont	40.78%	657	51.14%	824	8.06%	130	1,611
Garfield	48.91%	452	49.35%	456	1.73%	16	924
Gilpin	36.14%	570	57.57%	908	6.27%	99	1,577
Grand	39.01%	71	59.89%	109	1.09%	2	182
Gunnison	48.31%	790	47.82%	782	3.85%	63	1,635
Hinsdale	48.94%	116	50.21%	119	0.84%	2	237
Huerfano	49.43%	523	49.81%	527	0.75%	8	1,058
Jefferson	46.34%	646	43.54%	607	10.11%	141	1,394
La Plata	50.61%	578	48.42%	553	0.96%	11	1,142
Lake	55.49%	2,749	43.82%	2,171	0.68%	34	4,954
Larimer	42.83%	723	37.79%	638	19.37%	327	1,688
Las Animas	65.76%	1,500	33.88%	773	0.35%	8	2,281
Mesa	44.12%	274	54.42%	338	1.44%	9	621
Montrose	48.51%	326	48.51%	326	2.97%	20	672
Ouray	61.31%	702	38.34%	439	0.34%	4	1,145
Park	48.02%	474	51.57%	509	0.40%	4	987
Pitkin	49.17%	776	49.87%	787	0.95%	15	1,578
Pueblo	59.11%	1,579	37.85%	1,011	3.03%	81	2,671
Rio Grande	44.26%	270	53.27%	325	2.45%	15	610
Routt	48.54%	133	51.45%	141	0.00%	0	274
Saguache	52.62%	361	46.20%	317	1.16%	8	686
San Juan	47.58%	414	52.18%	454	0.22%	2	870
San Miguel	55.29%	470	44.70%	380	0.00%	0	850
Summit	50.25%	492	49.54%	485	0.20%	2	979
Weld	44.78%	1,318	42.20%	1,242	13.01%	383	2,943

Counties that flipped from Republican to Democratic

- Boulder
- Chaffee
- Delta
- Jefferson
- Lake
- Larimer
- Weld
- San Miguel
- Summit

Counties that flipped from Democratic to Republican

- Costilla
- Huerfano

Counties that flipped from Republican to Tied

- Montrose
