= George Milton Corlett =

American politician

George Milton Corlett (November 7, 1884 – February 16, 1955) was the 24th Lieutenant Governor of Colorado, serving from 1927 to 1931 under William Herbert Adams.

Political offices
Preceded by Sterling Byrd Lacy	Lieutenant Governor of Colorado; 1927–1931	Succeeded by Edwin C. Johnson
