= Jared L. Brush =

American politician

9th Lieutenant Governor of Colorado
- In office 1895–1899
- Governor: Albert McIntire; Alva Adams
- Preceded by: David H. Nichols
- Succeeded by: Francis Patrick Carney

President of the Colorado Senate
- In office 1895–1898
- Preceded by: David H. Nichols
- Succeeded by: Francis Patrick Carney

Member of the Colorado Senate
- In office 1895–1899

Member of the Colorado House of Representatives
- In office 1879–1882

Personal details
- Born: July 6, 1835 Clermont County, Ohio, U.S.
- Died: April 24, 1913 (aged 77) Greeley, Colorado, U.S.
- Party: Republican

Jared L. Brush (July 6, 1835 – April 24, 1913) was the ninth Lieutenant Governor of Colorado. He was a Republican and served from 1895 to 1899 under governors Albert McIntire and Alva Adams.

== Biography ==
He was born in Clermont County, Ohio on July 6, 1835. He moved to Iowa and then to Greeley, Colorado, arriving in 1859. He was a prospector and rancher who developed early irrigation systems and encouraged agricultural associations. He served as sheriff of Weld County in 1871, as a county commissioner from 1874 to 1877, and as a state representative from 1879 to 1882. He also served in the Colorado Senate from 1895 to 1898, serving as the Senate President during those years. In 1896 he became a banker but continued to encourage agriculture and education. He died April 24, 1913, in Greeley.

== Memory ==
The town of Brush, Colorado is named after Jared L. Brush. A barn, the Jared L. Brush Barn, built by Brush on his farm in Weld County, Colorado, still stands and was listed on the National Register of Historic Places in 1991.

Political offices
Preceded by David H. Nichols	Lieutenant Governor of Colorado; 1895–1899	Succeeded by Francis P. Carney
