= William Grover Smith =

American politician

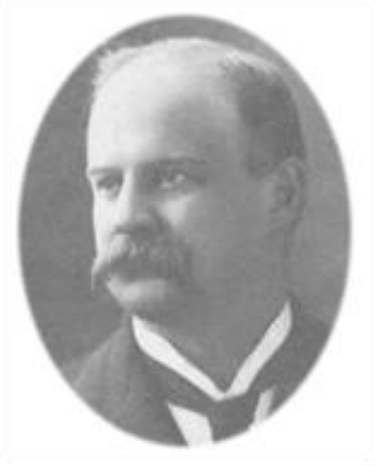

6th Lieutenant Governor of Colorado
- In office January 8, 1889 – January 13, 1891
- Governor: Job Adams Cooper
- Preceded by: Norman H. Meldrum
- Succeeded by: William Story

Personal details
- Born: April 27, 1857; Newton, New Jersey
- Died: November 3, 1921 (aged 64); Golden, Colorado
- Political party: Republican
- Spouse: Lake Erie Mealey

William Grover Smith (April 27, 1857 – November 3, 1921) was the sixth Lieutenant Governor of Colorado, serving from 1889 to 1891 under Job Adams Cooper.

== Biography ==
Smith was born in Newton, New Jersey, on April 25, 1857 and moved to Detroit with his family in 1865. He attended publics schools and moved to Colorado in 1872. He began a career in journalism in 1873 for the Golden Globe, and became an investor in the paper, then sole owner.

He then became private secretary to Governor Frederick Pitkin in 1880, and superintendent of the Jefferson County schools afterwards. In 1899, he was elected Lieutenant Governor of Colorado.

He became the speaker of the General Assembly in January 1899. He was a tramway official and lawyer. He also served as the President of the Colorado Senate from 1889-1890.

Around 1900, he became president of the Denver and Intermountain Railroad Company, and retired from the Tramway Company in 1918. He later served as Denver County attorney. He died on November 3, 1921, in Colorado.

Political offices
| Preceded by Norman H. Meldrum | Lieutenant Governor of Colorado; 1889–1891 | Succeeded by William Story |
