= James Pulliam =

American politician (1863–1934)

James A. Pulliam (October 12, 1863 – September 17, 1934) was the 19th Lieutenant Governor of Colorado, serving from 1917 to 1919 under Julius Caldeen Gunter. He was born in Scotland County, Missouri and died in Durango, Colorado. Pulliam was a Democrat.

Political offices
Preceded by Moses E. Lewis	Lieutenant Governor of Colorado; 1917–1919	Succeeded by George Stephan
