= Mike Callihan =

American Democratic politician

42nd Lieutenant Governor of Colorado
- In office January 13, 1987 – May 10, 1994
- Governor: Roy Romer
- Preceded by: Nancy Dick
- Succeeded by: Samuel H. Cassidy

Member of the Colorado Senate
- In office 1983–1987

Member of the Colorado House of Representatives
- In office 1979–1983

Personal details
- Born: August 7, 1947 (age 78) Spokane, Washington, U.S.
- Party: Democratic
- Spouse: Debra McDonald Callihan
- Profession: Businessman

Michael Callihan (born August 7, 1947) is an American Democratic politician who was the 42nd Lieutenant Governor of Colorado, serving from 1987 to 1994 under Roy Romer. He was an unsuccessful candidate for congress in 1992, losing to Republican Scott McInnis.

== Personal information ==
Collis Michael 'Mike' Callihan was born in Spokane, Washington, on August 7, 1947.

== Education ==
He graduated from Regis High School in Denver, Colorado, and obtained his degree from Western State College in Gunnison, Colorado.

== Career ==
Callihan is a businessman and politician who served in the U.S. Navy. In 1974, Mike was elected Gunnison County Assessor. In 1978 he was elected to serve in the Colorado House of Representatives, and in 1982 he was elected to serve in the Colorado Senate.

Callihan served with Colorado Governor Roy Romer as the 42nd Lieutenant Governor of Colorado. Mike Callihan became the first Lt. Governor in Colorado history to resign the post early. He resigned on May 10, 1994.

== Bills ==
Callihan introduced bills in effort to the youth with their drug and alcohol addictions.

== Family ==
Callihan is married to Debra McDonald Callihan.

Political offices
Preceded by Nancy Dick	Lieutenant Governor of Colorado; 1987–1994	Succeeded by Samuel H. Cassidy
