= Francis Patrick Carney =

American politician (1846–1902)

10th Lieutenant Governor of Colorado
- In office 1899–1901
- Governor: Charles S. Thomas
- Preceded by: Jared L. Brush
- Succeeded by: David C. Coates

President of the Colorado Senate
- In office 1899–1900
- Preceded by: Jared L. Brush
- Succeeded by: David C. Coates

Member of the Colorado Senate from the 18th district
- In office 1895–1899

Member of the Colorado House of Representatives
- In office 1893–1895

Personal details
- Born: September 20, 1846 County Fermanagh, Ireland
- Died: May 4, 1902 (aged 55) Ouray, Colorado, U.S.
- Party: Populist

Francis Patrick Carney (September 20, 1846 – May 4, 1902) was an Irish-American politician who served as the 10th Lieutenant Governor of Colorado. He was a member of the Populist Party and served from 1899 to 1901 under Governor Charles Spalding Thomas.

== Early life ==
He was born September 20, 1846, in County Fermanagh, Ireland. His family emigrated to New York City in 1859 and moved to Ouray, Colorado in 1877.

== Career ==
He became a mason and worked as a contractor and miner as well as an organizer of labor unions. His first elected office was as a member of the Ouray County Board of County Commissioners. He was elected to a three-year term on the board in 1879 and was also elected as the board's chairman. However, he quit the board after serving only one year and returned to the private sector. He served as member of the Colorado House of Representatives from 1893 to 1895 and the Colorado Senate from 1895 to 1899. He served as President of the Colorado Senate from 1899 to 1900. Carney served as the 10th Lieutenant Governor of Colorado from 1899 to 1901.

== Death ==
He died May 4, 1902, in Ouray, Colorado.

Political offices
Preceded by Jared L. Brush	Lieutenant Governor of Colorado; 1899–1901	Succeeded by David C. Coates
