= David H. Nichols =

American politician (1826–1900

David Nichols
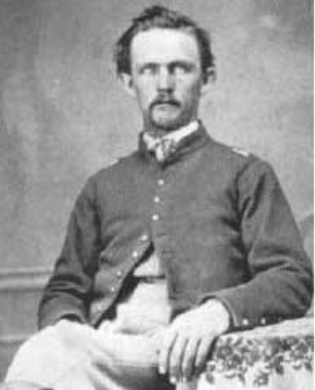

8th Lieutenant Governor of Colorado
- In office 1893–1895
- Governor: Davis Hanson Waite
- Preceded by: William Story
- Succeeded by: Jared L. Brush

Personal details
- Born: March 16, 1826
- Died: December 17, 1900 (aged 74)
- Party: Populist
- Relations: Lora Webb Nichols (granddaughter)

David Hopkinson Nichols (March 16, 1826 – December 17, 1900) was the eighth Lieutenant Governor of Colorado, United States, serving from 1893 to 1895 under Davis Hanson Waite.

Nichols was born in Hardwick, Vermont in 1826. He served in the Mexican–American War and later moved to Colorado, living there beginning in 1859. He was elected sheriff of Boulder in 1863, but absented himself from office in order to take a captain's commission with the Third Colorado Volunteer Cavalry, called upon by Territorial Governor John Evans in 1864 to suppress Indian uprisings. In his capacity as Captain of Company D, Nichols participated in the infamous Sand Creek Massacre on November 29, 1864.

Following his return to Boulder, Nichols was elected to the territorial Legislature and gave up his position as Sheriff. He served two non-consecutive terms in the Legislature. A member of Columbia Lodge #14 he and his masonic brothers were instrumental in bringing the University of Colorado to Boulder.

Nichols served as lieutenant governor of Colorado from 1893 to 1895 and was a member of the Board of Commissioners for the Colorado State Penitentiary for 19 years. Nichols died at his home near Boulder on the night of December 17, 1900.

== See also ==
- Lora Webb Nichols, his granddaughter

Political offices
Preceded by William Story	Lieutenant Governor of Colorado; 1893–1895	Succeeded by Jared L. Brush
