= Moses E. Lewis =

American politician

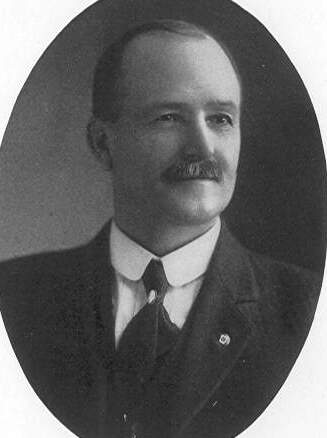

18th Lieutenant Governor of Colorado
- In office January 12, 1915 – January 9, 1917
- Governor: George Alfred Carlson
- Preceded by: Stephen R. Fitzgarrald
- Succeeded by: James A. Pulliam

Personal details
- Born: July 26, 1854 Coal Valley, Illinois
- Died: March 13, 1951 (aged 96) Pasadena, California
- Party: Republican

Moses E. Lewis (July 26, 1854 – March 13, 1951) was the 18th Lieutenant Governor of Colorado, serving from 1915 to 1917 under George Alfred Carlson.

Political offices
Preceded by Stephen R. Fitzgarrald	Lieutenant Governor of Colorado; 1915–1917	Succeeded by James Pulliam
