= Sterling Byrd Lacy =

American politician (1882–1957)

Sterling Byrd Lacy (May 3, 1882 – March 7, 1955) was the 23rd Lieutenant Governor of Colorado, serving from 1925 to 1927 under Clarence Morley.

== Early life ==
Sterling Byrd Lacy was born on May 3, 1882, at Elwood, near Fredericksburg, Virginia, to Sallie Byrd Goodwin Lacy and William Sterling Byrd Lacy. He graduated from Locust Dale Academy near Charlottesville.

== Career ==
In 1902, Lacy moved from New Mexico to Grand Junction, Colorado. He worked in the banking industry for 12 years. After 1917, he became an official with the Colorado Life Insurance Company and served as its president in 1935. He was elected as a Democrat and served for two terms with the Colorado House of Representatives, from 1919 to 1921 and from 1923 to 1925. He served as the Lieutenant Governor of Colorado from 1925 to 1927. He was a commissioner with the Colorado budget and efficiency commission from 1927 to 1929. He was chairman of the Loudoun County Selective Service Board for 12 years until his resignation in 1952.

== Personal life ==
Lacy married Della Margaret Lumsden on February 2, 1910. They had a son, William Sterling Byrd Lacy. His son William served as United States Ambassador to Korea in 1955.

Lacy married Mabel (or Allene) Linn in 1937. In 1938, he bought a house near Leesburg in Loudoun County, Virginia. He died following a heart condition on March 7, 1955, in Daytona Beach, Florida.

Political offices
Preceded by Robert F. Rockwell	Lieutenant Governor of Colorado; 1925–1927	Succeeded by George Milton Corlett
