= George Stephan =

American politician

George Stephan (March 30, 1862 – September 9, 1944) was the 20th Lieutenant Governor of Colorado, serving from 1919 to 1921 under Oliver Henry Shoup. He was born in Cleveland, Ohio and died in La Jolla, California. Stepham was a Republican.

Political offices
Preceded by James Pulliam	Lieutenant Governor of Colorado; 1919–1921	Succeeded by Earl Cooley
