= 1900 Colorado gubernatorial election =

- November 6, 1900
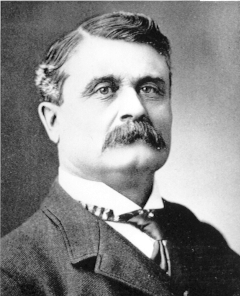

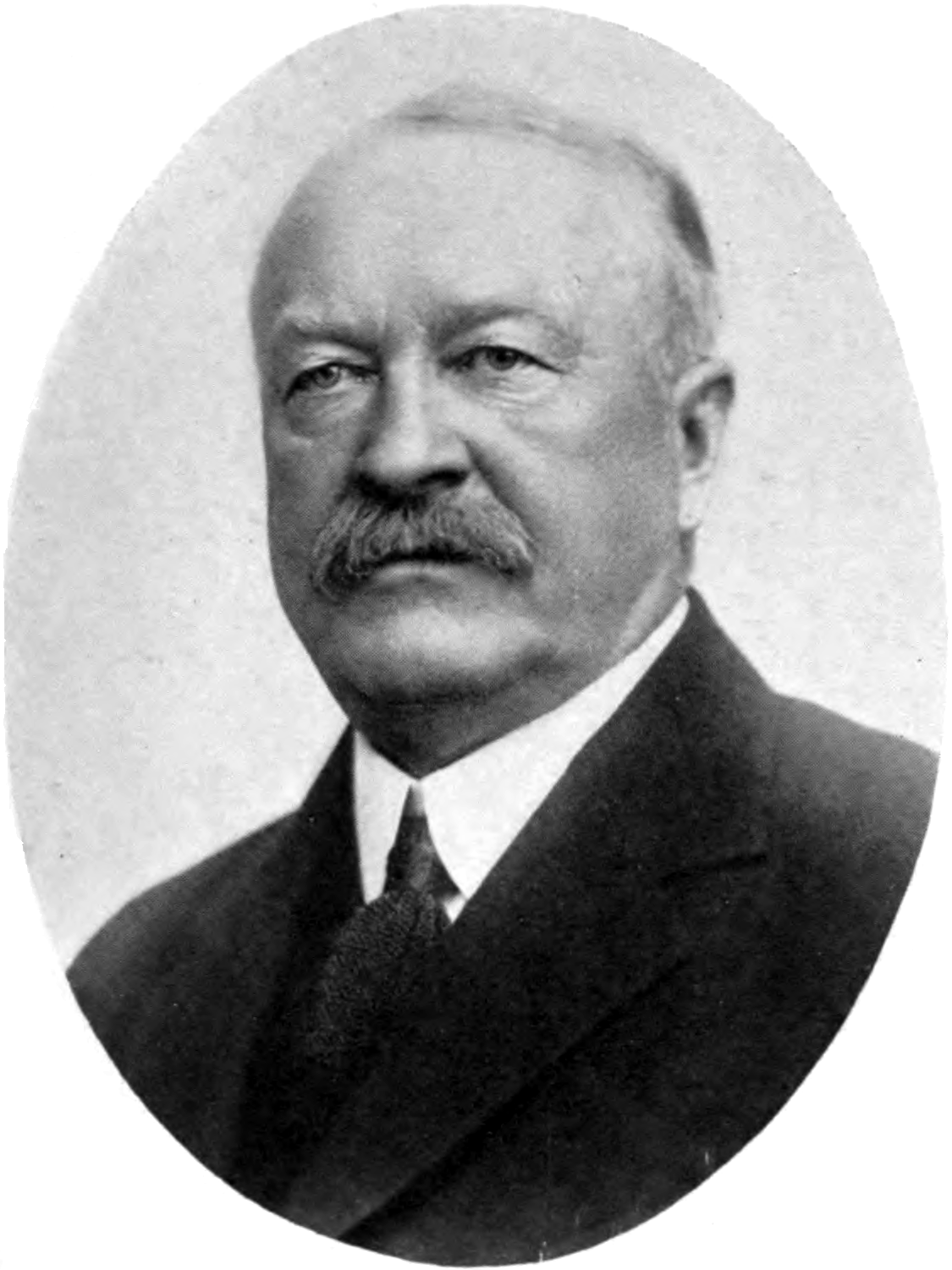
Nominee	James Bradley Orman	Frank C. Goudy
Party	Democratic	Republican
Popular vote	118,647	96,027
Percentage	53.78%	43.53%
- County results Orman: 40–50% 50–60% 60–70% 70–80% 80–90% Goudy: 40–50% 50–60% 60–70%
Governor before election
Charles S. Thomas
Democratic
Elected Governor
James Bradley Orman
Democratic

The 1900 Colorado gubernatorial election was held on November 6, 1900. Democratic nominee James Bradley Orman defeated Republican nominee Frank C. Goudy with 53.78% of the vote.

== General election ==
=== Candidates ===
Major party candidates

- James Bradley Orman, Democratic
- Frank C. Goudy, Republican

Other candidates

- James R. Wylie, Prohibition
- DeWitt Copley, Socialist Labor
- S. B. Hutchinson, Independent
- James T. Pearson, People's

=== Results ===
1900 Colorado gubernatorial election
Party	Candidate	Votes	%	±%
Democratic	James Bradley Orman	118,647	53.78%	−9.11%
Republican	Frank C. Goudy	96,027	43.53%	+9.36%
Prohibition	James R. Wylie	3,695	1.68%	−0.13%
Socialist Labor	DeWitt Copley	987	0.45%	−0.69%
Independent	S. B. Hutchinson	843	0.38%	
Populist	James T. Pearson	421	0.19%	
Majority		22,620	10.25%	
Turnout		220,620		
Democratic hold		Swing		
