= George Alfred Carlson =

American governor for Colorado (1876-1926)

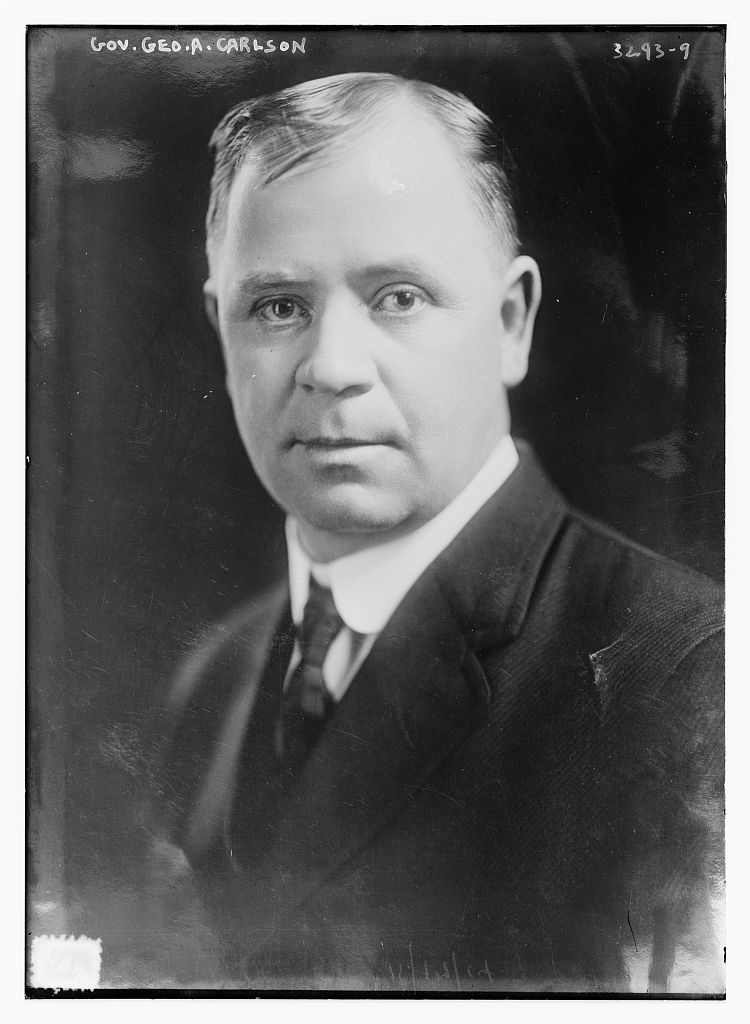

20th Governor of Colorado
- In office January 12, 1915 – January 9, 1917
- Lieutenant: Moses E. Lewis
- Preceded by: Elias Milton Ammons
- Succeeded by: Julius Caldeen Gunter

Personal details
- Born: October 23, 1876 Alta, Iowa, U.S.
- Died: December 6, 1926 (aged 50) Denver, Colorado, U.S.
- Party: Republican
- Spouse: Rosa Lillian Alps
- Children: 2
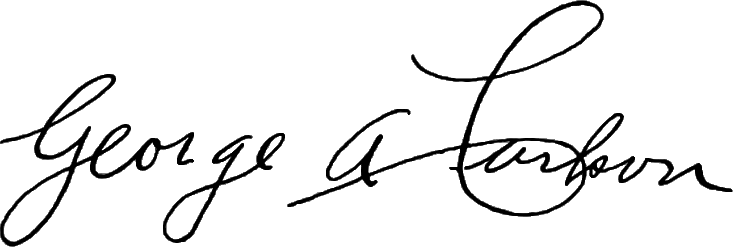
- Signature

George Alfred Carlson (October 23, 1876 – December 6, 1926) was the 20th governor of Colorado from 1915 to 1917.

== Biography ==
He was born on October 23, 1876, in Alta, Iowa.

Carlson graduated from the University of Colorado Boulder in 1902 and earned his law degree there in 1904. He practiced law in Fort Collins, Colorado, from 1905 to 1908, and was district attorney in Fort Collins from 1908 to 1914. He ran for governor as a Republican in 1914 and won, benefiting from vote-splitting between Democrats and Progressives.

Carlson's administration was noted for labor reforms, including the passage of a workers' compensation law and the establishment of the Industrial Commission of Colorado. He also supported and signed into law a prohibition bill making Colorado a "dry state."

Carlson was defeated for reelection in 1916. After leaving office, he returned to law practice in Denver.

He died on December 6, 1926, in Denver, Colorado.

Party political offices
Preceded by Clifford C. Parks	Republican nominee for Governor of Colorado; 1914, 1916	Succeeded by Oliver Henry Shoup
Political offices
Preceded by Elias M. Ammons	Governor of Colorado; 1915–1917	Succeeded by Julius C. Gunter
