= Erastus Harper =

American politician (1854–1927)

Erastus Rudd Harper (July 14, 1854 – May 12, 1927) was the 16th Lieutenant Governor of Colorado, serving from 1907 to 1909 under Henry Augustus Buchtel.

Political offices
Preceded by Fred W. Parks	Lieutenant Governor of Colorado; 1907–1909	Succeeded by Stephen R. Fitzgarrald
