= Stephen R. Fitzgarrald =

American politician (1854–1926)

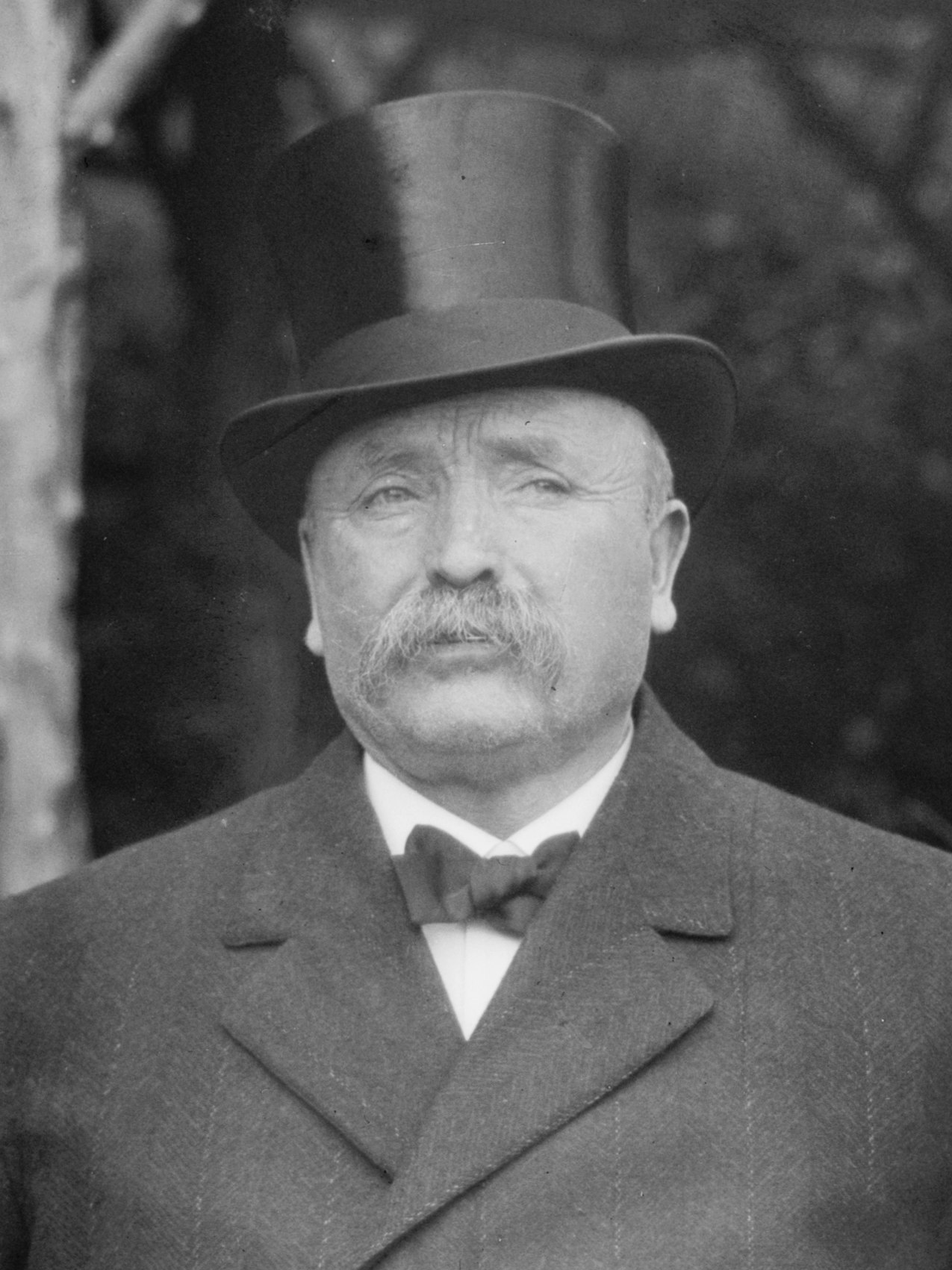

17th Lieutenant Governor of Colorado
- In office January 12, 1909 – January 12, 1915
- Governor: John F. Shafroth; Elias M. Ammons
- Preceded by: Erastus Harper
- Succeeded by: Moses E. Lewis

Member of the Colorado House of Representatives from the San Miguel County district
- In office 1893–1895

Personal details
- Born: December 25, 1854 Center Point, Iowa
- Died: June 2, 1926 (aged 71) Denver, Colorado
- Party: Democratic
- Spouse: Letha L. McConnell
- Children: Letha Amelia
- Occupation: Attorney, Politician

Stephen R. Fitzgarrald (December 25, 1854 – June 2, 1926) was the 17th Lieutenant Governor of Colorado, serving from 1909 to 1915 serving under Governors John F. Shafroth and Elias M. Ammons as a member of the Democratic party.

== Early life ==
Stephan and his father George Fitzgarrald came to Colorado in 1879 as prospectors. During a brief period of mining in Leadville he developed an interest in law, shortly after which he returned to Iowa to study law.

== Political career ==
In 1881, he settled permanently in Colorado. First living in Ophir, he moved to Telluride in 1883. On March 22, 1885, Stephan married Letha L. McConnell. In 1915, he moved again to the Silverton-Ouray district and later to Denver. Fitzgarrald served as City, County, and Deputy District Attorney. Stephan was a member of the Colorado House of Representatives between the years of 1893 and 1895.

Stephen sponsored legislation of benefit to people of Colorado, dealing with deed of trust sales, attachment suits, and excessive tax penalties.

== Notes ==
Political offices
Preceded by Erastus Harper	Lieutenant Governor of Colorado; 1909–1915	Succeeded by Moses E. Lewis
