= Earl Cooley (politician) =

American politician

21st Lieutenant Governor of Colorado
- In office 1921–1923
- Governor: Oliver Henry Shoup
- Preceded by: George Stepham
- Succeeded by: Robert F. Rockwell

State Board and Land Commissioners
- In office 1923–1927

Personal details
- Born: March 27, 1880 Richmond, Illinois
- Died: May 6, 1940 (aged 60) Adams County, Colorado
- Party: Republican
- Spouse: Helen West
- Children: Maxine Cooley

Military service
- Allegiance: United States
- Branch/service: United States Army
- Rank: Major
- Unit: 2nd Colorado Infantry

Earl Cooley (March 27, 1880 – May 6, 1940) was the 21st Lieutenant Governor of Colorado, serving from 1921 to 1923 under Oliver Henry Shoup.

He was born in Richmond, Illinois on March 27, 1880. He was married and had one child. He served in World War I in the 2nd Colorado Infantry. He had no public political office until he was elected to the office of Lieutenant Governor of Colorado. On February 17, 1922, while acting as governor, he pardoned a man whom he had defended on the charge of horse-stealing in 1907. After his term as Lieutenant Governor of Colorado he served as a member of State board and Land Commissioners from 1923 to 1927. He died on May 6, 1940.

Political offices
Preceded by George Stephan	Lieutenant Governor of Colorado; 1921–1923	Succeeded by Robert F. Rockwell
