= Samuel H. Cassidy =

American politician

43rd Lieutenant Governor of Colorado
- In office May 11, 1994 – January 3, 1995
- Governor: Roy Romer
- Preceded by: Mike Callihan
- Succeeded by: Gail Schoettler

Member of the Colorado Senate from the 6th district
- In office 1991–1994
- Preceded by: Robert E. DeNier
- Succeeded by: Ben Alexander

Minority Leader of the Colorado Senate
- In office 1993–1994
- Preceded by: Larry Trujillo
- Succeeded by: Mike Feeley

Personal details
- Born: January 16, 1950 (age 76) Shreveport, LA
- Party: Democratic
- Education: University of Oklahoma; University of Tulsa
- Occupation: Attorney

Samuel H. Cassidy (born January 16, 1950) is an attorney and was a professor at the University of Denver from 2000 to 2015, where he taught law and ethics. Following his retirement from the University of Denver, he served as a county judge in Archuleta County, Colorado from 2015 to 2016. He was the 43rd Lieutenant Governor of Colorado, serving from 1994 to 1995 under Roy Romer. Before taking that office, he served as a Colorado State Senator from 1991 to 1994 and was the minority leader of the Senate for two years.

Cassidy was president and CEO of the Colorado Association of Commerce and Industry from 1998 until 2000.

Cassidy earned his undergraduate degree from the University of Oklahoma in 1972 and his Juris Doctor degree from the University of Tulsa College of Law in 1975.

Political offices
Preceded by Mike Callihan	Lieutenant Governor of Colorado; 1994–1995	Succeeded by Gail Schoettler
