= List of lieutenant governors of Colorado =

List of lieutenant governors of the U.S. State of Colorado

Coordinates: 38.9972°N 105.5478°W

Lieutenant Governor of Colorado
- Official seal

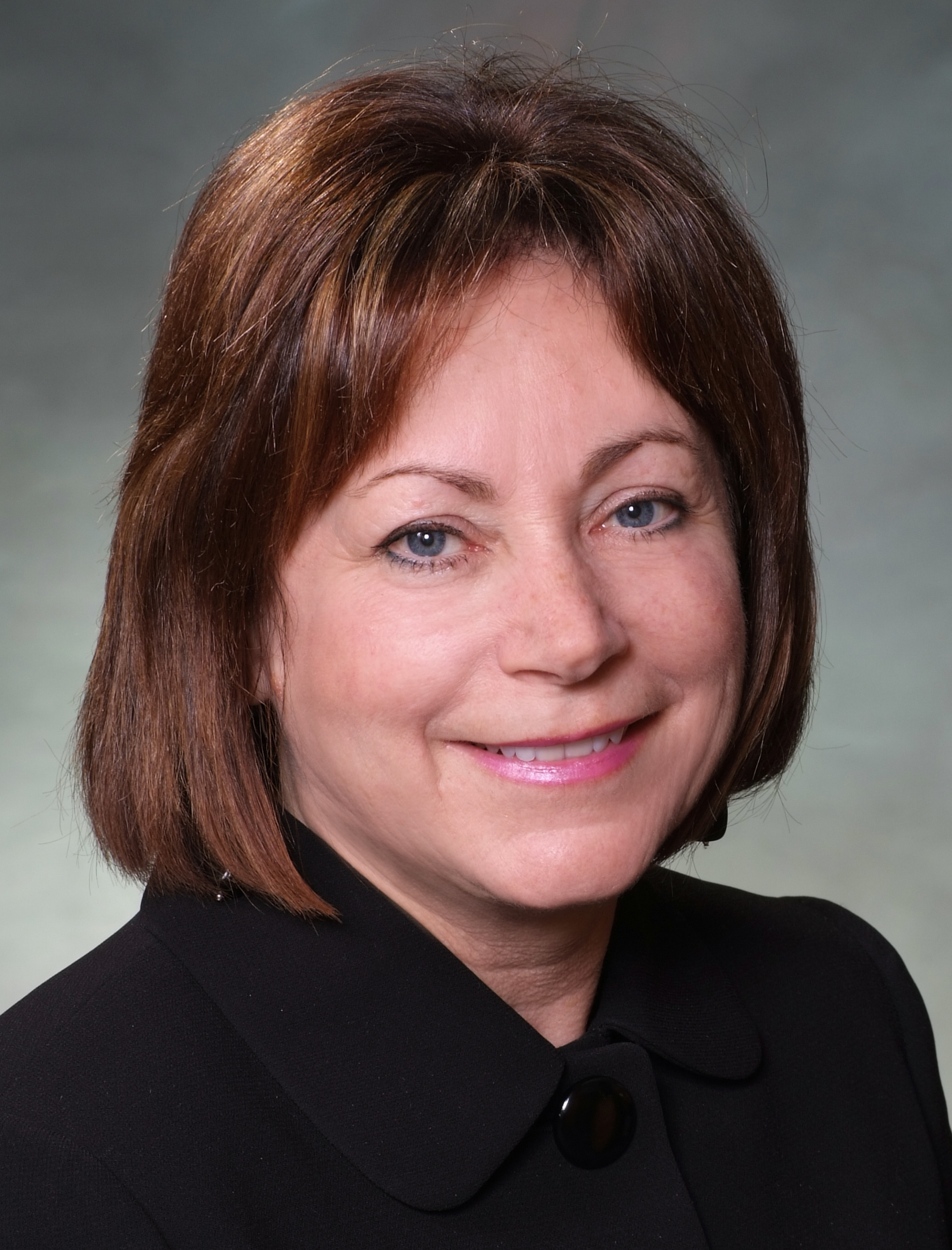
- Incumbent; Dianne Primavera since January 8, 2019
- Government of Colorado
- Style: The Honorable
- Term length: Four years, renewable once consecutively
- Inaugural holder: Lafayette Head
- Formation: 1877
- Succession: First
- Salary: $93,360 per year

The lieutenant governor of Colorado is the second-highest-ranking member of the executive department of the Government of Colorado, United States, below the governor of Colorado. The lieutenant governor of Colorado, who acts as governor of Colorado in the absence of the officeholder and succeeds to the governorship in case of vacancy, is elected on a partisan ticket.

After the 1966 general election, the Constitution of Colorado was amended to require the joint election of governor and lieutenant governor — candidates running as a ticket. Prior to this amendment, the lieutenant governor candidate was elected separately from the governor during the same election—sometimes resulting in a governor and a lieutenant governor from different political parties.

The current lieutenant governor is Dianne Primavera, a Democrat, who took office January 8, 2019.

== Lieutenant governors ==
Lieutenant governors of the State of Colorado
No.	Lieutenant Governor	Term in office	Party	Election	Governor (Note: Lieutenant governors represented the same party as their governor unless noted.)
1	Lafayette Head (1825–1897)	November 3, 1876 – January 14, 1879 (did not run)	Republican	1876	John Long Routt
2	Horace Tabor (1830–1899)	January 14, 1879 – January 9, 1881 (did not run)	Republican	1878	Frederick Walker Pitkin
—	George B. Robinson (d. 1880)	Died before taking office	Republican	1880 (Note: Robinson was elected in the 1880 election, but died before taking office; the sitting lieutenant governor, Tabor, claimed the office and held it for the term.)	Frederick Walker Pitkin
2	Horace Tabor (1830–1899)	January 9, 1881 – January 9, 1883 (did not run)	Republican	1880	Frederick Walker Pitkin
3	William H. Meyer (1847–1923)	January 9, 1883 – January 13, 1885 (did not run)	Republican	1882	James Benton Grant (Note: Represented the Democratic Party.)
4	Peter W. Breene (1846–1926)	January 13, 1885 – January 11, 1887 (did not run) (Note: Breene instead ran successfully for Colorado State Treasurer.)	Republican	1884	Benjamin Harrison Eaton
5	Norman H. Meldrum (1841–1920)	January 11, 1887 – January 8, 1889 (did not run)	Republican	1886	Alva Adams
6	William Grover Smith (1857–1921)	January 8, 1889 – January 13, 1891 (did not run)	Republican	1888	Job Adams Cooper
7	William Story (1843–1921)	January 13, 1891 – January 10, 1893 (did not run)	Republican	1890	John Long Routt
8	David H. Nichols (1826–1900)	January 10, 1893 – January 8, 1895 (did not run)	Populist	1892	Davis Hanson Waite
9	Jared L. Brush (1835–1913)	January 8, 1895 – January 10, 1899 (did not run)	Republican	1894	Albert McIntire
9	Jared L. Brush (1835–1913)	January 8, 1895 – January 10, 1899 (did not run)	Republican	1896	Alva Adams
10	Francis Patrick Carney (1846–1902)	January 10, 1899 – January 8, 1901 (did not run)	Populist	1898	Charles Spalding Thomas
11	David C. Coates (1868–1933)	January 8, 1901 – January 13, 1903 (did not run)	Democratic	1900	James Bradley Orman
12	Warren A. Haggott (1864–1958)	January 13, 1903 – January 10, 1905 (did not run)	Republican	1902	James Hamilton Peabody
13	Jesse Fuller McDonald (1858–1942)	January 10, 1905 – March 17, 1905 (succeeded to governor) (Note: The 1904 gubernatorial election was rife with fraud and controversy. Alva Adams won election, but soon after Adams took office the Republican legislature declared Peabody to be the actual winner, on the condition that Peabody immediately tender his resignation, postdated to the next day. Peabody's lieutenant governor, McDonald, then succeeded to the governorship. Cornforth, as president pro tempore of the senate, acted as lieutenant governor until the Colorado Supreme Court declared that Parks, who had been elected president pro tempore of the senate on April 3, 1905, was the rightful acting lieutenant governor.)	Republican	1904	Alva Adams (declared loser March 17, 1905)
13	Jesse Fuller McDonald (1858–1942)	January 10, 1905 – March 17, 1905 (succeeded to governor)	Republican	1904	James Hamilton Peabody (resigned March 17, 1905)
14	Arthur Cornforth (1861–1938)	March 17, 1905 – July 5, 1905 (resigned)	Republican	Succeeded from president of the Senate	Jesse Fuller McDonald
15	Fred W. Parks (1871–1941)	July 5, 1905 – January 8, 1907 (did not run)	Republican	Succeeded from president of the Senate	Jesse Fuller McDonald
16	Erastus Harper (1854–1927)	January 8, 1907 – January 12, 1909 (did not run)	Republican	1906	Henry Augustus Buchtel
17	Stephen R. Fitzgarrald (1854–1926)	January 12, 1909 – January 14, 1913 (did not run)	Democratic	1908	John F. Shafroth
17	Stephen R. Fitzgarrald (1854–1926)	January 12, 1909 – January 14, 1913 (did not run)	Democratic	1910	John F. Shafroth
—	Benjamin F. Montgomery (1834–1912)	Died before taking office	Democratic	1912	Elias M. Ammons
17	Stephen R. Fitzgarrald (1854–1926)	January 14, 1913 – January 12, 1915 (did not run)	Democratic	1912	Elias M. Ammons
18	Moses E. Lewis (1854–1951)	January 12, 1915 – January 9, 1917 (lost election)	Republican	1914	George Alfred Carlson
19	James Pulliam (1863–1934)	January 9, 1917 – January 14, 1919 (did not run)	Democratic	1916	Julius Caldeen Gunter
20	George Stephan (1862–1944)	January 14, 1919 – January 11, 1921 (did not run)	Republican	1918	Oliver Henry Shoup
21	Earl Cooley (1880–1940)	January 11, 1921 – January 9, 1923 (did not run) (Note: Cooley instead ran unsuccessfully for the Republican nomination for governor.)	Republican	1920	Oliver Henry Shoup
22	Robert F. Rockwell (1886–1950)	January 9, 1923 – January 13, 1925 (did not run) (Note: Rockwell instead ran unsuccessfully for the Republican nomination for governor.)	Republican	1922	William Ellery Sweet
23	Sterling Byrd Lacy (1882–1957)	January 13, 1925 – January 11, 1927 (did not run)	Democratic	1924	Clarence Morley (Note: Represented the Republican Party)
24	George Milton Corlett (1884–1955)	January 11, 1927 – January 13, 1931 (did not run)	Republican	1926	Billy Adams
24	George Milton Corlett (1884–1955)	January 11, 1927 – January 13, 1931 (did not run)	Republican	1928	Billy Adams
25	Edwin C. Johnson (1884–1970)	January 13, 1931 – January 10, 1933 (elected governor)	Democratic	1930	Billy Adams
26	Ray Herbert Talbot (1896–1955)	January 10, 1933 – January 1, 1937 (succeeded to governor)	Democratic	1932	Edwin C. Johnson (resigned January 2, 1937)
26	Ray Herbert Talbot (1896–1955)	January 10, 1933 – January 1, 1937 (succeeded to governor)	Democratic	1934	Edwin C. Johnson (resigned January 2, 1937)
—	Office vacant from January 1–12, 1937		Office vacated by succession to governor		Ray Herbert Talbot
27	Frank Hayes (1882–1948)	January 12, 1937 – January 10, 1939 (lost election)	Democratic	1936	Teller Ammons
28	John Charles Vivian (1887–1964)	January 10, 1939 – January 12, 1943 (elected governor)	Republican	1938	Ralph Lawrence Carr
28	John Charles Vivian (1887–1964)	January 10, 1939 – January 12, 1943 (elected governor)	Republican	1940	Ralph Lawrence Carr
29	William Eugene Higby (1884–1967)	January 12, 1943 – January 14, 1947 (did not run)	Republican	1942	John Charles Vivian
29	William Eugene Higby (1884–1967)	January 12, 1943 – January 14, 1947 (did not run)	Republican	1944	John Charles Vivian
30	Homer Pearson (1900–1985)	January 14, 1947 – January 11, 1949 (lost election)	Republican	1946	William Lee Knous (resigned April 15, 1950)
31	Walter Walford Johnson (1904–1987)	January 11, 1949 – April 15, 1950 (succeeded to governor)	Democratic	1948	William Lee Knous (resigned April 15, 1950)
32	Charles P. Murphy (1882–1953)	April 15, 1950 – January 9, 1951 (did not run)	Republican	Succeeded from president of the Senate	Walter Walford Johnson
33	Gordon Allott (1907–1989)	January 9, 1951 – January 11, 1955 (did not run) (Note: Allott instead ran successfully for the United States Senate.)	Republican	1950	Daniel I. J. Thornton
33	Gordon Allott (1907–1989)	January 9, 1951 – January 11, 1955 (did not run)	Republican	1952	Daniel I. J. Thornton
34	Stephen McNichols (1914–1997)	January 11, 1955 – January 8, 1957 (elected governor)	Democratic	1954	Edwin C. Johnson
35	Frank L. Hays (1922–2003)	January 8, 1957 – January 13, 1959 (lost election)	Republican	1956	Stephen McNichols
36	Robert Lee Knous (1917–2000)	January 13, 1959 – January 10, 1967 (did not run) (Note: Knous instead ran unsuccessfully for governor.)	Democratic	1958	Stephen McNichols
36	Robert Lee Knous (1917–2000)	January 13, 1959 – January 10, 1967 (did not run)	Democratic	1962	John Arthur Love (resigned July 16, 1973)
37	Mark Anthony Hogan (1931–2017)	January 10, 1967 – January 12, 1971 (did not run) (Note: Hogan instead ran unsuccessfully for governor.)	Democratic	1966	John Arthur Love (resigned July 16, 1973)
38	John D. Vanderhoof (1922–2013)	January 12, 1971 – July 16, 1973 (succeeded to governor)	Republican	1970	John Arthur Love (resigned July 16, 1973)
39	Ted L. Strickland (1932–2012)	July 16, 1973 – January 14, 1975 (lost election)	Republican	Succeeded from president of the Senate	John D. Vanderhoof
40	George L. Brown (1926–2006)	January 14, 1975 – January 10, 1979 (did not run)	Democratic	1974	Richard Lamm
41	Nancy Dick (b. 1930)	January 10, 1979 – January 13, 1987 (did not run)	Democratic	1978	Richard Lamm
41	Nancy Dick (b. 1930)	January 10, 1979 – January 13, 1987 (did not run)	Democratic	1982	Richard Lamm
42	Mike Callihan (b. 1947)	January 13, 1987 – May 10, 1994 (resigned)	Democratic	1986	Roy Romer
42	Mike Callihan (b. 1947)	January 13, 1987 – May 10, 1994 (resigned)	Democratic	1990	Roy Romer
—	Office vacant from May 10–11, 1994		Office vacated by succession to governor		Roy Romer
43	Samuel H. Cassidy (b. 1950)	May 11, 1994 – January 3, 1995 (did not run)	Democratic	Appointed by governor	Roy Romer
44	Gail Schoettler (b. 1943)	January 3, 1995 – January 12, 1999 (did not run) (Note: Schoettler instead ran unsuccessfully for governor.)	Democratic	1994	Roy Romer
45	Joe Rogers (1964–2013)	January 12, 1999 – January 14, 2003 (did not run) (Note: Rogers instead ran unsuccessfully for the Republican nomination for the United States House of Representatives.)	Republican	1998	Bill Owens
46	Jane Norton (b. 1954)	January 14, 2003 – January 9, 2007 (did not run)	Republican	2002	Bill Owens
47	Barbara O'Brien (b. 1950)	January 9, 2007 – January 11, 2011 (did not run)	Democratic	2006	Bill Ritter
48	Joseph Garcia (b. 1957)	January 11, 2011 – May 12, 2016 (resigned) (Note: Garcia resigned to be President of the Western Interstate Commission for Higher Education.)	Democratic	2010	John Hickenlooper
48	Joseph Garcia (b. 1957)	January 11, 2011 – May 12, 2016 (resigned)	Democratic	2014	John Hickenlooper
49	Donna Lynne (b. 1953)	May 12, 2016 – January 8, 2019 (did not run) (Note: Lynne instead ran unsuccessfully for the Democratic nomination for governor.)	Democratic	Appointed by governor	John Hickenlooper
50	Dianne Primavera (b. 1950)	January 8, 2019 – Incumbent (Note: Primavera's second term began on January 10, 2023, and will expire on January 12, 2027; she will be term-limited.)	Democratic	2018	Jared Polis
50	Dianne Primavera (b. 1950)	January 8, 2019 – Incumbent	Democratic	2022	Jared Polis
51	Lesley Dahlkemper (b. 1966/1967)	Lieutenant governor-elect takes office January 12, 2027	Democratic	2026	Phil Weiser

== See also ==
- Bibliography of Colorado
- Geography of Colorado
- History of Colorado
- Index of Colorado-related articles
- List of Colorado-related lists
- Outline of Colorado
