= William Gray Evans =

- Born: December 16, 1855; Evanston, Illinois, US
- Died: October 21, 1924 (aged 68); Denver, Colorado, US
- Occupations: Tramway and railroad president
- Spouse: Cornelia Lunt Gray Evans
- Parent(s): John Evans; Margaret Gray Evans
- Relatives: Anne Evans (sister)

William Gray Evans (December 16, 1855 – October 21, 1924) was the oldest son of Colorado's second territorial governor, John Evans and Margaret Gray Evans. He was president of the Denver Tramway Company. He oversaw the completion of the Moffat Tunnel and worked for four years on the City Beautiful project of Mayor Robert Walter Speer. He owned the Byers-Evans House, now the Byers-Evans House Museum, which is listed on the National Register of Historic Places.

== Early life and education ==
Born in Evanston, Illinois, on December 16, 1855, he was the oldest child of John Evans and Margaret Gray Evans. He moved with his parents to Denver, Colorado in 1862 when Abraham Lincoln appointed his father, John Evans as Colorado's territorial governor. They lived in Denver at 14th and Arapahoe streets.

== Career ==
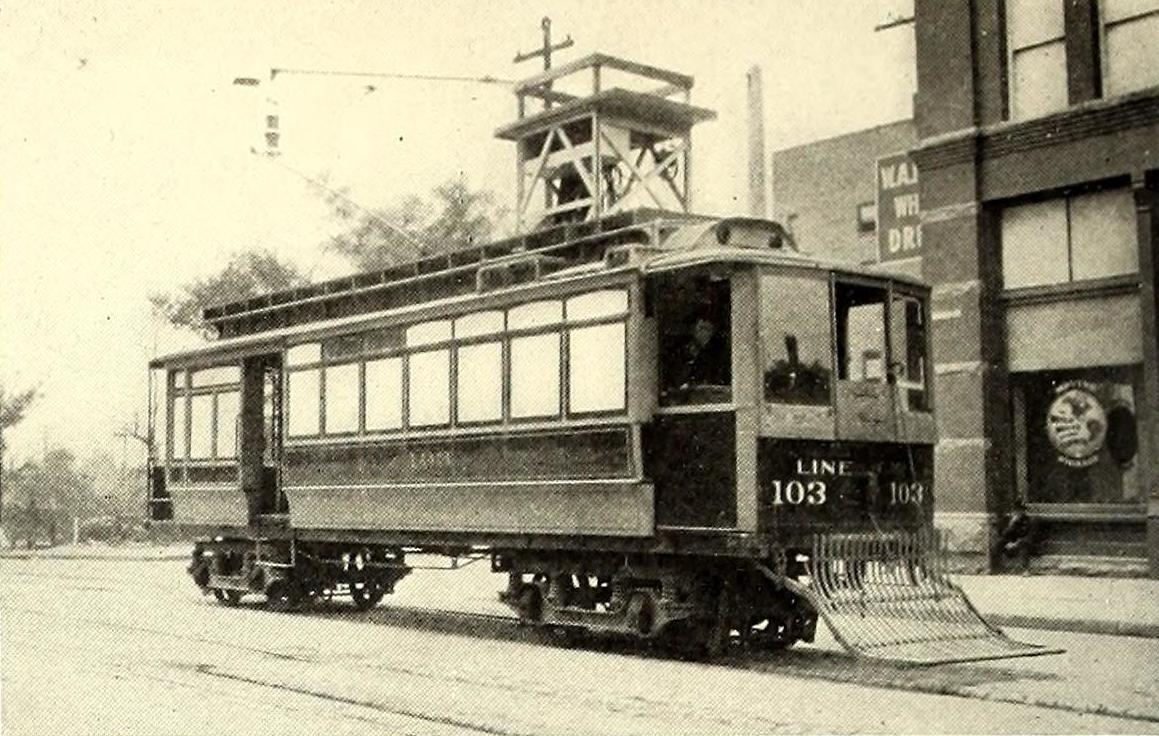
Denver Tramway streetcar, 1909

Evans, his father John Evans, William Byers, Roger Woodbury and Henry C. Brown incorporated the Denver Tramway Company in 1866. William Evans served as secretary and later president of the Denver Tramway Company. Under his leadership, the Denver Tramway became a monopoly in the Denver area, putting horse railway and streetcar companies out of business. The tramway company then installed electricity-driven streetcars in every Denver neighborhood. Travel by tramway was essential within the city because most people did not have horses and carriages. Aside from a means of transportation for daily life, they were also used to transport caskets to the Riverside or Fairmount Cemeteries or were rented out for weddings. He oversaw the construction of the Denver Tramway headquarters at 14th and Arapahoe Streets, on the site of John Evan's family home. The building is now the Hotel Teatro.

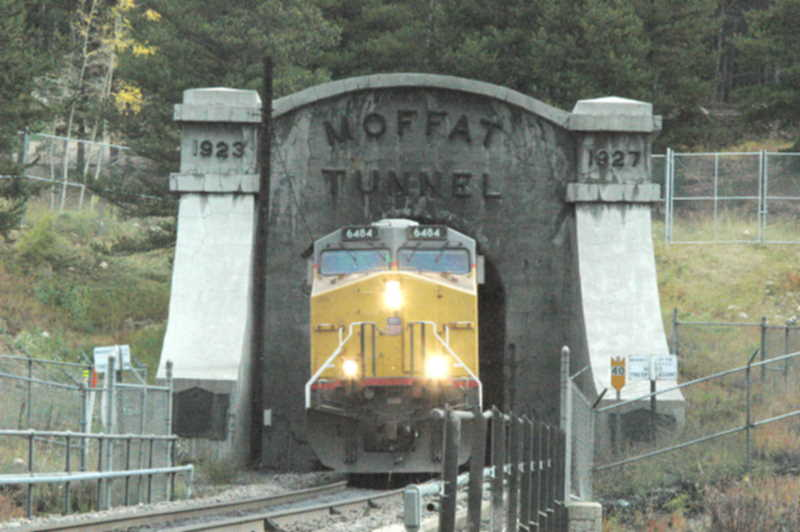
Moffat Tunnel

Evans was instrumental in building the Moffat Tunnel. He worked with David Moffat in financing the project in New York. Evans was with David Moffat at the time of his death in 1911, and the Grand Valley News described him as "the mainstay of Mr. Moffat in his railroad building and other enterprises for a number of years." After David Moffat's death, he took over Moffat's positions as president of the Denver, Northwestern & Pacific Railway as well as president of the Colorado-Utah Construction Company. Taking over Moffat's former offices allowed him to continue the work the two men had started in negotiating the terms of the Moffat Tunnel's construction. The tunnel, which provided railroad service between Denver and the Western Slope, was completed in 1927. The first railroad train through the tunnel was from the Denver and Salt Lake Railway.

Evans was also influential in Denver politics in the first years of the twentieth century, and counted Denver Mayor Robert W. Speer and University of Denver chancellor Henry Buchtel among his personal friends. He is said to have "controlled Denver's political machine for many years.

Between 1909 and 1913, Evans worked on Mayor Robert Walter Speer's plan for a City Beautiful, which involved creating parks throughout Denver. The plan for the parks was created the Evans family in 1894. He retired in 1913.

== Personal life ==
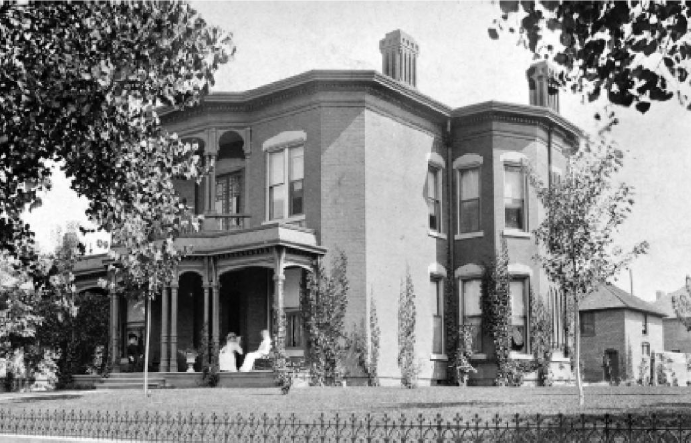
Byers–Evans House, Denver, about 1889, when the Evans family members were photographed. It was the home of William Gray Evans beginning 1889. In 1900, Margaret Gray Evans and her daughter Anne Evans moved into the house.

He was married to Cornelia Lunt Gray (1863-1955), his first cousin and the daughter of William Patten Gray. His mother Margaret Gray Evans and William Patten Gray were sister and brother. Cornelia and William had four children, John, Josephine, Margaret, and Katherine Evans. John was the president of the First National Bank of Denver.

William Gray Evans' home at 1310 Bannock Street in Denver is now a historic house museum, operated as the Byers-Evans House Museum. After the death of his father John Evans on July 3, 1897, William transferred the deed to the Byers-Evans House to his wife. Cornelia's father, who was a widower, moved into their home about 1897. A two-story addition with an elevator was added to the house in 1900 for his mother Margaret Gray Evans and his sister Anne Evans who moved into the house. Anne remained in the house after Cornelia and William's death. Evans family members lived in the house until 1981.

He died on October 21, 1924 in Denver, and he was buried at Fairmount Cemetery.

== Legacy ==
His son, John, said that his father and grandfather were "dreamers and believers in the future." Of his father, he continued:

My father died financially exhausted but with great faith that his dreams would become reality. How much finer to leave that kind of heritage than to bequeath a great fortune.

— John Evans
