= David Moffat =

American financer industrialist (1839–1911)

- Portrait, c. 1898
- Born: David Halliday Moffat; July 22, 1839; Washingtonville, New York
- Died: March 18, 1911 (aged 73)
- Occupations: financer; industrialist
- Known for: Pioneering Denver, Colorado

David Halliday Moffat (July 22, 1839 – March 18, 1911) was an American financier and industrialist, who was one of the original pioneers of Denver, Colorado.

== History ==
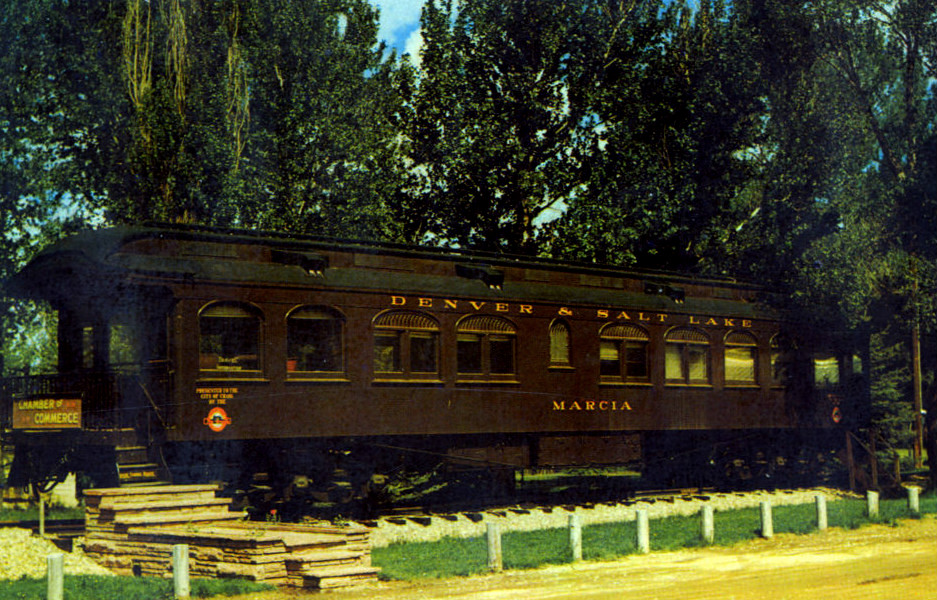
Moffat's private rail car, named for his daughter, Marcia. Built by Pullman in 1909, it is permanently based in Craig, Colorado.

Moffat was born in Washingtonville, New York, to David and Catherine Gregg. In 1851, when he was twelve years old, he moved to New York City, where he began work as a messenger boy in the New York Exchange Bank, now the Irving Exchange National Bank. His starting position was minor, but he was eager to learn the banking business. Moffat was noticed by the president, and advanced to the position of assistant teller. In 1855 he made his way to Des Moines, Iowa, and became teller in the bank of A. J. Stevens & Company. Moffat then became cashier of the Bank of Nebraska, owned by B. F. Alien, of Des Moines. He moved to Denver, Colorado, in 1860, where he opened a bookstore on 15th and Larimer. The book and stationery store was not highly profitable, so after a few years he went back to banking. On April 17, 1865, the First National Bank of Denver was organized. It had little success until 1867, when Moffat was elected cashier. He remained the controlling mind in the institution until his death, being elected to the presidency in 1880. He instituted policies and methods which led to the growth and success of the bank for years to come.

== Railroad involvement ==
=== Denver Pacific Railway ===
The construction of the Denver Pacific Railway linking Cheyenne and Denver was widely credited at the time for reviving the city of Denver, which had been founded less than a decade before during the Colorado Gold Rush. The decision to build the transcontinental railroad to the north had left the Denver area stranded from the major transportation routes. As a result, Thomas Durant, vice president of the Union Pacific, pronounced Denver "too dead to bury." Colorado Territorial Governor John Evans declared that "Colorado without railroads is comparatively worthless." As a result, Evans, together with other local business leaders, including David Moffat, William Byers (founder of the Rocky Mountain News), Bela M. Hughes and others, partnered with East Coast investors to form a railroad company that would link Denver and the Colorado Territory with the national rail network. The company was incorporated on November 19, 1867, as the "Denver Pacific Railway and Telegraph Company". The company broke ground on its Cheyenne line on May 18, 1868, at a spot near where the Denver Coliseum now stands. The line took approximately two years to complete. It followed the South Platte River through present-day Greeley.

=== Denver, South Park and Pacific Railroad ===
The Denver, South Park and Pacific Railroad got its start in 1872 when a group of Denver businessmen headed by Colorado Governor John Evans, David Moffat, and other local business leaders formed a railroad company that would link Denver and South Park and the mining country. It was a historic narrow gauge railway that operated in Colorado in the western United States in the late 19th century. The railroad opened up the first rail routes to a large section of the central Colorado mining district in the decades of the mineral boom. The railroad took its name from the fact that its main line from Denver ascended the Platte Canyon and traversed South Park. The company operated as an independent railroad from its founding in 1872 until it was sold in foreclosure proceedings in 1889. Its lines later became part of the Colorado and Southern Railway.

=== Denver and New Orleans ===
The Denver and New Orleans Railroad, later to be known as the Denver, Texas & Gulf Railroad and would become part of the Colorado and Southern Railway, was started by Colorado Governor John Evans, David Moffat and other associates in 1881 to give Denver an outlet to the Gulf. They built from Denver to Pueblo, when the work was taken over by General Dodge and others and completed to Fort Worth.

=== Denver Tramway ===
Denver Tramway was started by Colorado Governor John Evans, David Moffat and other associates in 1886. Denver Tramway was the first trolley line in Denver.

=== Manitou and Pike's Peak Railway ===
The Manitou and Pike's Peak Railway is an Abt system rack railway in Colorado (United States), climbing the well-known mountain Pikes Peak. The base station is in Manitou Springs, Colorado, near Colorado Springs. The railway is the highest in North America by a considerable margin. It was built and is operated solely for the tourist trade. The railway was started by Zalmon G. Simmons, inventor and founder of the Simmons Beautyrest Mattress Company and David Moffat. The company was founded in 1889 and limited service to the Halfway House Hotel was started in 1890. The summit was reached the following year.

=== Denver & Rio Grande ===
In 1885 David Moffat was elected to Denver & Rio Grande board. Then in 1887 Moffat was elected president of the Denver & Rio Grande. Moffat built the Glenwood to Grand Junction, standard gauging Pueblo to Grand Junction, and the Tennessee pass tunnel. David H. Moffat resigned as president of D&RG in 1891 due to foreign bondholder's displeasure with Denver management of company. Moffat had wanted to build directly west from Denver to Salt Lake City and had spent $200,000 of the D&RG's money on surveys in the James Peak neighborhood. He would later go on to build the Denver, Northwestern and Pacific Railway in the same place.

=== Creede Branch ===
1892 David Moffat next developed a railroad to Creede from Wagon Wheel Gap, Colorado. Along the banks of the Rio Grande to Creede, which was then a booming silver camp, where he owned mining claims. The Denver & Rio Grande Railroad wanted nothing to do with it, so Moffat built the road entirely at his own expense, forming the Rio Grande Gunnison Railway Company. Then when it began to make a profit he sold it at a heavy profit to the Denver & Rio Grande Railroad.

=== Denver, Northwestern and Pacific Railway (Moffat Line) ===
David H. Moffat and his business associates established the Denver, Northwestern and Pacific Railway. It originated in Denver and was planned to terminate in Salt Lake City, Utah, though it went bankrupt before reaching that city. Moffat built his own depot for his railroad at Fifteenth and Bassett, which was three blocks west of Denver's Union Station. By 1913, reorganized as the Denver & Salt Lake Railway, it reached Craig in Moffat County, Colorado, along the Colorado-Utah border.

=== Moffat Tunnel ===
David Moffat envisioned a tunnel through the continental divide west of Denver. Construction of the Moffat Tunnel took place from 1923 to 1927. It was officially opened on February 28, 1928, with much fanfare and several trainloads of special guests in attendance at the East Portal. D&SL locomotive 205, a 2-6-6-0 compound locomotive, pulled the first official passenger train through the new tunnel. The Moffat Tunnel is 6.2 miles long.

== Mining holdings ==
- Caribou, Colorado- Caribou mine
- Creede, Colorado
- Cripple Creek, Colorado, Colorado-Anaconda and Golden Cycle
- Leadville, Colorado-Breece iron mine, Maid, Henriette, Resurrection and Little Pittsburg Consolidated (purchased from H.A.W. Tabor)
- Victor, Colorado
- White Hills, Arizona-Moffat-Root Company -White Hills Mining Company

Moffat partnered with Jerome B. Chaffee and H.A.W. Tabor in many mines. He had claims in over one hundred Colorado mines at one time or another. Mines belonging to David Moffat were involved in at least two significant strikes: the Cripple Creek strike of 1894, and the more widespread strikes of 1903.

== City ==
- Denver Union Water Company

== See also ==
- List of railroad executives
