= Anne Evans (arts patron) =

American arts patron (1871–1941)

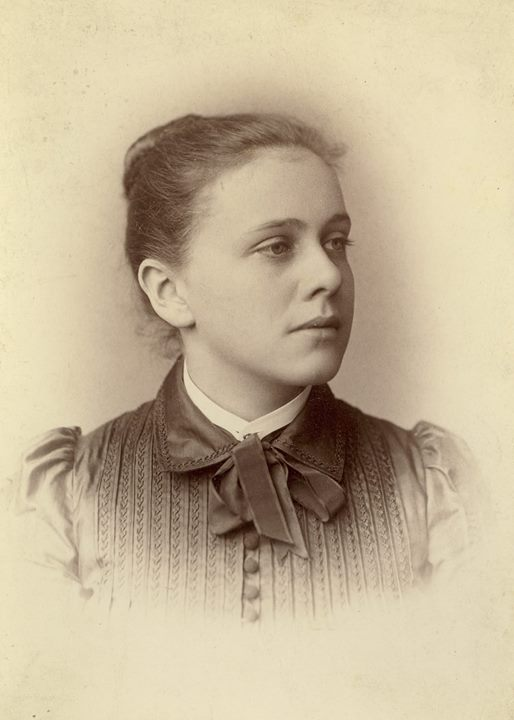
- Anne Evans, age 15, around 1886
- Born: January 23, 1871; London, England
- Died: January 6, 1941 (aged 69); Denver, Colorado
- Occupation: Arts patron
- Parent: John Evans

Anne Evans (January 23, 1871 – January 6, 1941) was an American arts patron. She devoted her life to the founding and support of some of Colorado's largest cultural institutions, including the Denver Art Museum, the Central City Opera, and the Denver Public Library. She had decades of experience in leadership positions, particularly in the field of art. She was also a leader of a conservation effort and a fundraiser during World War I.

Anne Evans was inducted into both the Colorado Business Hall of Fame and the Colorado Women's Hall of Fame in 2016.

She had her own cabin built on the Evans–Elbert Ranch, called the Anne Evans Mountain Home, near Evergreen, Colorado. It is listed on the National Register of Historic Places.

== Early life ==
Anne Evans was born on January 23, 1871, in London, England. The daughter of Margaret Gray Evans and the second Territorial Governor of Colorado, John Evans. Before he was governor, he was a physician, businessman, and educational benefactor. He was one of the founders of Northwestern University and founded the University of Denver. His investments in the railroads made him wealthy. Both of her parents were involved in religious, philanthropic, and cultural endeavors. Her mother was a patron of the arts.

In Denver, she attended Miss Mary Street's School and Wolfe Hall. While in her teens, she studied overseas at Misses Ferris' School in Paris and the Willard School in Berlin. She became interested in the arts from an early age, likely due to the influence of her parents. Her mother was a patron of the arts, and her parents had their own art collection. She was also encouraged by William M.R. French, the director of the Art Institute of Chicago who visited the Evans home, and Henry Read, her art instructor at Wolfe Hall. She also so masterpieces of art during her visits to Europe and New York.

She was the youngest of four children born to her parents. What would have been her older sister died in childhood. Her brother is William Gray Evans who was president of the Denver Tramway, which ran the city's streetcars. She preferred to spend her time at the family's Evans–Elbert Ranch in Evergreen. She was expected to be a lady while in Denver, but she could run and play in the country.

== Art study and collection ==
Evans studied art in Paris, Berlin, and at the Art Students League of New York and University of Denver. She preferred, though, to support cultural institutes rather than pursuing a career as an artist.

She collected art throughout her live and was particularly interested in Native American baskets, weaving and pottery—much of which was donated to the Denver Art Museum. She also collected santos. Evans worked for recognition of work of Native Americans as fine art and encouraged others to collect Native American art.

So we began to collect–blankets, pottery, basketry, jewelry, and the like. We did not collect them as curios nor for any archeological interest. We collected for beauty and form. We believed… that they had real art value.

— Caroline Bancroft, "She Created an Indian Cult," Independent Woman, 1935

She supported local artists by buying their works of art and then donating them to the Denver Art Museum. She also did this through commissions, financial support, and introductions to important people of the art community. One of the paintings that she donated to the museum was Rodeo Pick-Up Man by Frank Mechau.

She received an honorary doctorate of fine arts degree from the University of Denver in 1939.

== Career and philanthropy ==
She was a director of the Evans Investment Company.

=== Art ===
Evans joined the Denver Artists' Club in 1893, as did her mother, Margaret Gray Evans. It later became the Denver Art Museum. While she studied at the Art Students League of New York, she began to serve the club's governing council in 1896. She was a member of the board beginning in 1896. She then was on the board of the Denver Art Museum beginning in 1923, when it was incorporated, until 1931. She was then executive secretary in 1932 and then from 1934 to 1941. She was also an interim director at the museum from 1929 to 1932.

She organized the club's first Native American art exhibition in 1925, which included Spanish Colonial and Puebloan art from her collection. Due to donations from her collection, the Denver Art Museum was one of the first art museums in the country to show Native-American work. Further, the Spanish Colonial and Native Arts collections are considered two of the best art museum collections in the country. Evans assisted in appointing the first curators to this collection, Edgar C. McMechen and Eric Douglas.

She served on Mayor Robert W. Speer's Municipal Arts Commission from 1907 until 1914—and then again from 1932 to 1937. The group provided advice to the city council and the major about all public works of art, including monuments, sculptures, and paintings. She redesigned or established the Civic Center Park, which is today a National Historic Landmark. She sat on the boards of the Denver Allied Arts, where she was also a founder, and the Denver Artist Guild.

=== Library ===
She was appointed to the Denver Public Library Commission in 1907. She served two four-year terms and was the first female president of the commission. She led efforts to create eight branches, four of which include the Decker, Dickinson, Warren, and Woodbury branches. Gallery space was allotted at the main library due to Evan's influence. It was then moved to the City and County Building at the Civic Center, Denver.

=== World War I ===
During World War I, she used her organizational skills to support the war effort. She raised funds and encouraged others to create Liberty gardens in parks or their yards. To assist farmers who did not have workers to pick produce, Evans orchestrated an effort for 100 girls from Denver to work on farms. She was head of the food conservation department of the Woman's State Council of Defense. She toured the state to address women about conservation efforts.

=== Opera ===
The Central City Opera Association was co-founded in the 1930s by Evans, Edna Chappell, and Ida Kruse McFarlane. Though this, Evans was involved in the restoration of the Central City Opera House and the establishment of the Central City Opera Festival in 1932. Evans, along with her friend Ida Kruse McFarlane, secured the funds to save the opera house from demolition. It reopened with a production of the play Camille, starring Lillian Gish in 1932. She has been known for her work on the restoration of the opera house and the creation of the festival.

== Personal life ==
Evans never married or had children. She had her own cabin built on the Evans Ranch, called the Anne Evans Mountain Home, near Evergreen, Colorado. It had a view of the Rocky Mountains. Designed by Burnham Hoyt, it was reported on in the Rocky Mountain News and in the June 1917 edition of House Beautiful magazine. At her summer retreat, she rode horses, climbed Mount Blue Sky ((formerly Mount Evans), and hiking. She hosted plays with her friends at the country house. The house is listed on the National Register of Historic Places, and is privately owned.

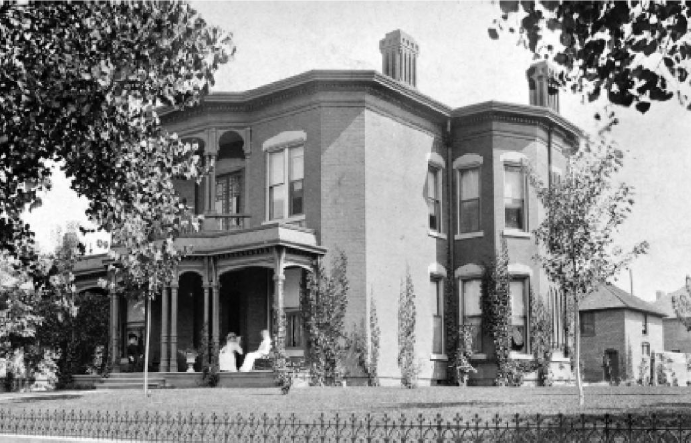
Byers–Evans House, Denver, about 1889, when the photograph was taken of Evans family members. It was the home of William Gray Evans beginning 1889. In 1900, Margaret Gray Evans and her daughter Anne Evans moved into the house.

Beginning in 1900, Evans and her mother, Margaret Gray Evans, lived at her brother, William Gray Evans house, called the Byers-Evans House. Anne had a wing in her brother's house. The house is a museum called the Center for Colorado Women's History operated by History Colorado and on the National Register of Historic Places and is a Denver landmark.

She died on January 6, 1941 of a heart attack. She was buried at Fairmount Cemetery in Denver.

== See also ==
- List of people from Denver
