= Margaret Gray Evans =

American philanthropist and Colorado Territory first lady

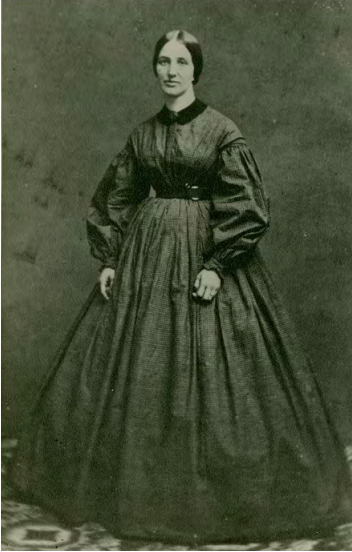
Margaret Gray Evans, wife of John Evans, governor of Colorado Territory, Northwestern University Archives

Margaret Gray Evans (August 21, 1830 – September 7, 1906) was the wife of Territorial Governor John Evans and a philanthropist. She arrived in Denver when it was a rough city, having grown up in a privileged home in Maine. Evans was First Lady of Colorado for her husband and her son-in-law, Samuel Hitt Elbert, who was a widower when he became governor. She was known for creating Denver society for the manner in which she entertained in what was the executive manor in Colorado. She assisted her husband on his educational and civil projects, and created her own. She founded the Denver Orphan's Home and was involved in the establishment of literary and charitable organizations. She was also active on boards of the University of Denver. She was the mother of William Gray Evans and Anne Evans.

== Early life and education ==
Margaret Patten Gray was born on August 21, 1830, in Bowdoinham, Maine. She was one of nine children born to Susan Felton Gray and Samuel Gray, a lawyer and shipbuilder.

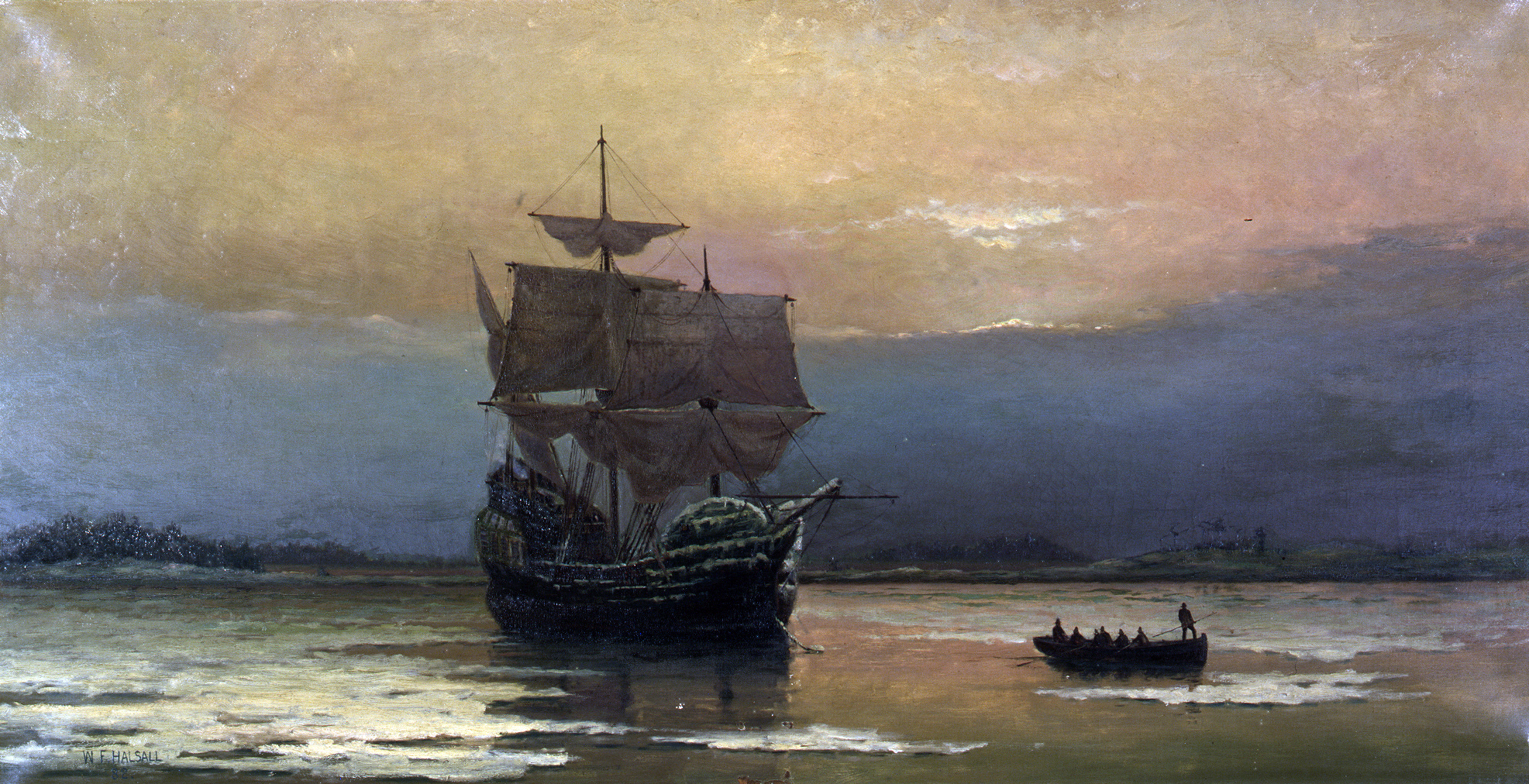
Mayflower in Plymouth Harbor by William Halsall (1882)

She is one of the Daughters of the American Revolution through her great-grandfather Pardon Gray and a descendant of two men on the Mayflower, Francis Cooke and Richard Warren.

Her sister Cornelia married Orrington Lunt, a wealthy grain broker who also helped found Northwestern University with John Evans. Paul Cornell, an attorney, married another sister. Cornell was a real estate developer who founded the town of Hyde Park, Illinois.

== Marriage and children ==
Margaret Gray married John Evans August 18, 1853, in Bowdoinham, Maine. It was the second marriage for John Evans, whose wife, Hannah Canby Evans, died of tuberculosis in 1850. She had a step-daughter, Josephine Evans, the only surviving child from his first marriage. The family moved to Chicago in 1855.

Margaret and John's children are:

- William Gray Evans, born on December 16, 1855, in Chicago
- Margaret Evans, born October 3, 1857, in Chicago and died at age 5 of scarlet fever in 1862
- Evan Elbert Evans, born June 26, 1863, in Evanston, Illinois (Note: Evan is said to be born in Denver, but an article about Margaret Gray Evans states that she returned to Evanston for the birth of their child.) Married to Kathryn Farrell of West Virginia, his stepdaughter was Madelyn Evans. He was a businessman in California, and then ran the Evans Investment Company. He died in 1921.
- Anne Evans born January 23, 1871.

Their daughter, Margaret, died a few months after John Evans moved to Denver while the rest of the family remained in Evanston, Illinois. Margaret and her son William moved to Colorado in November 1862 when her husband had sufficiently settled his affairs. They initially lived at Tremont House while their house was built. Josephine went away to school at the Wilbraham Wesleyan Academy in Wilbraham, Massachusetts. After she completed her schooling, she moved to Denver in late January 1864.

Margaret traveled to Washington, D.C., with her stepdaughter Josephine and niece Cornelia Gray Lunt to attend Abraham Lincoln's second inauguration. She also traveled to Evanston when Josephine married Samuel Hitt Elbert in 1865 at the Evanston home. Josephine had a child who died in 1868. She died of tuberculosis in 1868.

Margaret lived in London, England in the mid-1870s, during which John Evans had experienced losses due to mining and railroad investments.

== First Lady ==
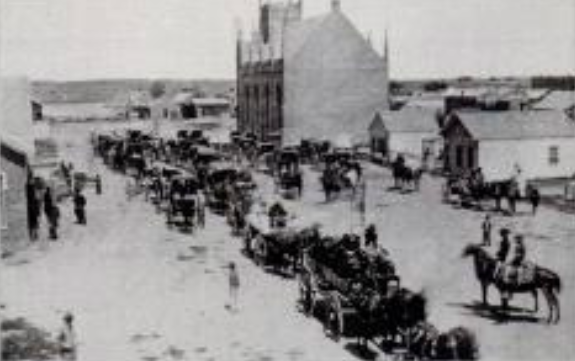
John Evans House, Denver, about 1870s

She became the First Lady of the Colorado Territory when her husband became the Territorial governor of Colorado Territory in 1862. Since William Gilpin, the first governor, was a bachelor, she was the first First Lady. Their home at 14th and Arapahoe Streets in Denver was the executive manor of the territory. While houses at the time were rough, low-roofed cabins, they lived in a one and a half story brick house. She built a significant library in the house. They lived there from 1863 to 1900.

During her husband's administration, there was a flood and fire in Denver, famine, and fear of attacks by Native Americans. Despite the difficulties, she organized Denver society with her friends who were also well-educated and dignified. People of the period stated that Denver society began with Margaret Gray Evans when she and her husband began entertaining members of the legislature in their home. It was the beginning of the many times that Margaret and her husband entertained. She was known for creating elegant evenings of music, lively conversation, and joy. Her skills were learned from "the hospitable and cultured but precise New England home of her girlhood."

In the 1870s, she supervised the expansion of their home into a three-story house, which served again as an executive manor when her son-in-law became the governor from 1873 to 1874. Since Josephine had died in 1868, Margaret was an acting First Lady for social and official functions.

== Community activity ==
While in Denver, she led committee meetings in her home. She was a member and officer of educational, religious, and charitable organizations. In addition to the projects that she enacted, she was a co-partner in her husband's educational and civic efforts. According to author Helen Canon, "She brought to these new tasks purposeful ambition, a vigorous mind, a Puritan conscience which forbade her to waste time, and a personal philosophy that 'a New Englander must never be beaten.'"

In 1872, she established the Denver Orphan's Home due to encouragement by Byers and contributions by other women. She was president of the Board of Directors the first year. It was later called the Denver Children's Home. She asked her son, William Gray Evans, who operated the Denver Tramway Company to let children ride for free. In 1872 or 1875, she co-founded the Ladies Relief Society with Elizabeth Byers and Frances Wisebart Jacobs. It was reorganized from the Ladies Aid Society that Byers founded in 1860. Byers and Evans founded the Old Ladies Home in 1873.

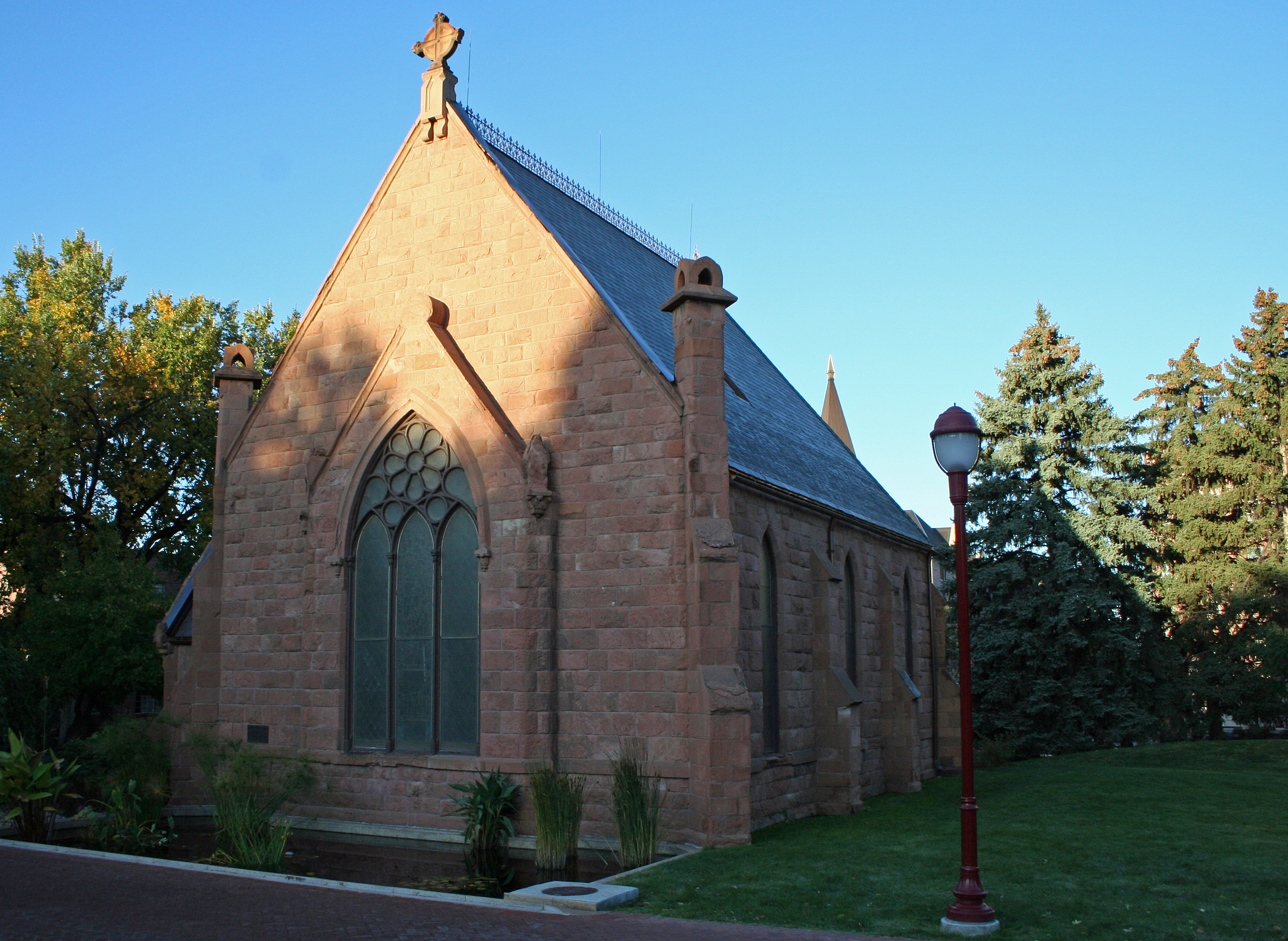
Evans Memorial Chapel codesigned by John and Margaret Gray Evans and built by John Evans after the death of his daughter, Josephine Evans Elbert. It is located on the University of Denver campus

She and her husband were involved in the design and construction of two Gothic churches, Evans Memorial Chapel, built in the memory of Josephine Evans Elbert and dedicated on October 10, 1878, and the Grace Methodist Church, which was dedicated on January 27, 1889. She served on the Colorado Seminary (now University of Denver) board of trustees from 1880 to 1900 and was a patron of the school's Fine Arts department. She was the president of the Board of Control when the department was reorganized as the Denver School of Fine Arts in 1892. In 1884, she chaired a committee to establish a woman's chair in the University of Denver. The committee of 20 women raised $30,000. From 1888 to 1891, Mary Lowe Dickinson was the Woman's Chair of Belles-lettres. She was a friend of Evans.

She was a member of the Women's Club of Denver and was listed among the members who were "reformers, suffragists, and public servants", along with Alice Hale Hill, Elizabeth Iliff Warren, Elizabeth F. Routt, Elizabeth Byers, Ella Denison, and Margaret P. Campbell. She was a member and president of the Denver Fortnight Club which was a "union of congenial minds for study and discussion and for the furtherance of good in practical ways." It was established in 1881. In 1889, it was renamed the Monday Literary Club.

She joined the Denver Artists' Club in 1893, as did her daughter Anne. It became the Denver Art Museum.

== Europe ==
She lived in Europe during two periods where she sought to improve her health, study and travel. She went to Europe in the fall of 1870 and established a home in London where her daughter Anne Evans was born on January 23, 1871. She returned to Colorado that winter. She returned to London in May 1875 and traveled on the Continent. She returned to Colorado in April 1877.

== Death ==
John Evans died in 1897 after which he lie in state in the capitol rotunda. He was buried in Riverside Cemetery in Denver. His estate passed to Margaret.

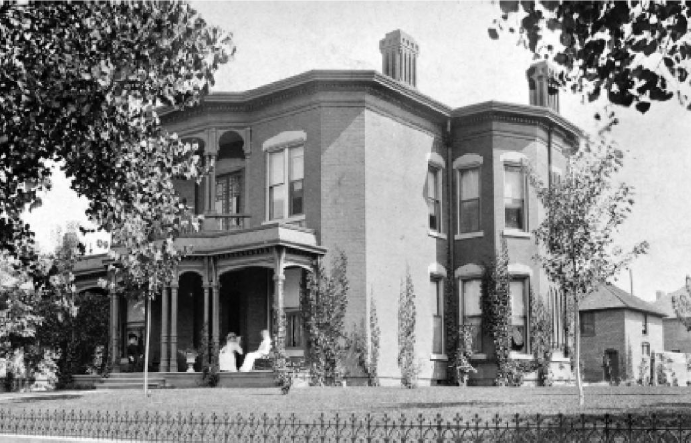
Byers–Evans House, Denver, about 1889, when the photograph was taken of Evans family members. It was the home of William Gray Evans beginning 1889. In 1900, Margaret Gray Evans and her daughter Anne Evans moved into the house.

Margaret Evans died on September 7, 1906, in Denver, Colorado and is buried next to her husband at Riverside Cemetery. Her diaries and papers are held in the collections of the Denver Public Library.
