= Denver Pacific Railway and Telegraph Company =

Defunct Denver company

Overview
- Headquarters: Denver, Colorado
- Locale: Colorado
- Dates of operation: 1867–1880

The Denver Pacific Railway was a historic railroad that operated in the western United States during the late 19th century. Formed in 1867 in the Colorado Territory, the company operated lines in Colorado and present-day southeastern Wyoming in the 1870s until merging with the Kansas Pacific and Union Pacific railroads in 1880. The railroad was formed primarily to create a link between Denver and the transcontinental railroad at Cheyenne, an achievement that was widely credited at the time with making Denver the dominant metropolis of the region.

== History ==
The construction of the rail line linking Cheyenne and Denver was widely credited at the time for reviving the city of Denver, which had been founded at the time of the Colorado Gold Rush and incorporated on November 7, 1861. The decision to build the transcontinental railroad to the north had left the fledgling city stranded from the major transportation routes. Many at the time expected that Cheyenne would blossom into the major population center of the region. As a result, Thomas Durant, vice president of the Union Pacific, pronounced Denver "too dead to bury." Colorado Territorial Governor John Evans declared that "Colorado without railroads is comparatively worthless."

=== Race To Cheyenne ===
As a result, Evans, together with other local business leaders, including David Moffat, William Byers (founder of the Rocky Mountain News), Joseph E. Bates, Bela M. Hughes, Walter Cheesman and Luther Kountze partnered with East Coast investors to form a railroad company that would link the Denver City and to a lesser degree the Territory of Colorado with the national rail network. The company was incorporated in the Territory of Colorado on November 19, 1867, as the "Denver Pacific Railway and Telegraph Company." A sense of urgency existed for this Denver based corporation, due to the formation of a rival, the Colorado, Clear Creek and Pacific Railway (later the Colorado Central), by W.A.H. Loveland and citizens of nearby Golden, with the intention of linking that city directly with Cheyenne and making Golden the natural hub of the territory.

To promote the new company and attract investors, Governor Evans orchestrated a large publicity campaign throughout Arapahoe County, including Denver City. Some of his partners lobbied wealthy locals to invest, while others persuaded middle and lower class citizens of Arapahoe County to contribute in the form of small pledges and even donations of their own time and labor to work to construct the line. Within several days, the company sold $300,000 in stock, but were unable to raise further funds to begin construction. The company was turned back in its efforts to solicit funds from the United States Congress, as well as from the Union Pacific, which had previously pledged funds to construct the line.

The efforts seemed to be on the brink of failure when Evans was able to persuade Congress to grant "the company" 900,000 acres (3,600 km^{2}) of land on the condition that the company build a line connecting the Union Pacific line with the existing Kansas Pacific line, which then extended only as far west as central Kansas. Subsequently, money was raised for construction of the line both by selling portions of the land and also by borrowing against portions of it. The fortunes of the company were further enhanced by the decision of the Kansas Pacific Railway to extend its line westward to Denver after receiving $6 million from German investors.

Racing to beat the Golden investors, the company broke ground on its Cheyenne line on May 18, 1868, at a spot near where the Denver Coliseum now stands. The event was cheered by a crowd of nearly 1,000 local citizens. The line took approximately two years to complete. It followed the South Platte River through present-day Greeley. The first railroad station in Denver was constructed at Wazee and Wynkoop streets in present-day Lower Downtown.

=== Completion and National Significance ===
The first train from Cheyenne arrived in Denver on June 24, 1870. Two months later, in August 1870, the Kansas Pacific completed its line to Denver and the first train arrived from Kansas. The Denver Pacific line intersected the Kansas Pacific at "Jersey Junction", three miles north of downtown Denver. With the completion of the Kansas Pacific line to Denver (completed at Strasburg on the Colorado Eastern Plains), the Denver Pacific became integral to the first transcontinental rail link between the east and west coasts of America. While the Union Pacific line had been declared finished in 1869 with the Golden spike event in Utah, linking it with the Central Pacific Railroad, passengers were required to disembark the train and cross the Missouri River at Omaha by boat. With the completion, it was finally possible to embark a train on the east coast and disembark on the west coast.

The Denver Pacific's rival, the Colorado Central line from Golden, was not completed until 1877. By this time, Denver had established its supremacy over its rival as the population center and capital city of the newly admitted State of Colorado.

In the 1870s, investors of the Kansas Pacific eventually acquired control of the railroad. On January 24, 1880, the railroad merged with the Kansas Pacific and Union Pacific, with the resulting company retaining the Union Pacific name.

== See also ==
- Kansas Pacific Railway
- Union Pacific Railroad
