= John Evans (Colorado governor) =

American politician in Colorado (1814–1897)

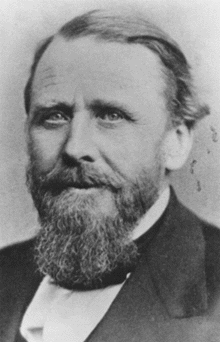

2nd Governor of the Territory of Colorado
- In office March 26, 1862 – October 17, 1865
- Preceded by: William Gilpin
- Succeeded by: Alexander Cummings

Personal details
- Born: March 9, 1814 near Waynesville, Ohio, US
- Died: July 2, 1897 (aged 83) Denver, Colorado, US
- Party: Whig, then Republican (1850s +)
- Spouse(s): Hannah Canby; Margaret Gray Evans
- Children: Josephine Evans Elbert; William Gray Evans; Anne Evans

John Evans (March 9, 1814 – July 2, 1897) was an American politician, physician, founder of various hospitals and medical associations, railroad promoter, second governor of the Territory of Colorado, and namesake of Evanston, Illinois; Evans, Colorado; and formerly Mount Evans, Colorado.

He is most noted for being one of the founders of both Northwestern University and the University of Denver. The John Evans professorships, the highest honors bestowed on faculty members at both Northwestern University and the University of Denver, are named for him. By bringing railroad service to Denver from several directions, he was responsible for the growth of Denver from a settlement to a city.

Evans was forced to resign the governorship in 1865 for his role in instigating the Sand Creek massacre, one of the worst massacres of Native Americans in U.S. history.

== Early life and education ==
Evans was born in Waynesville, Ohio, on March 9, 1814, to British immigrants Rachel and David Evans, a farmer, hardware store owner, and real estate investor. Rachel and David were both from Wales. He graduated from Cincinnati College with a degree in medicine in March 1838. (Note: It is also reported that he received his medical degree in 1838 from Transylvania University.)

== Career ==
=== Medicine ===
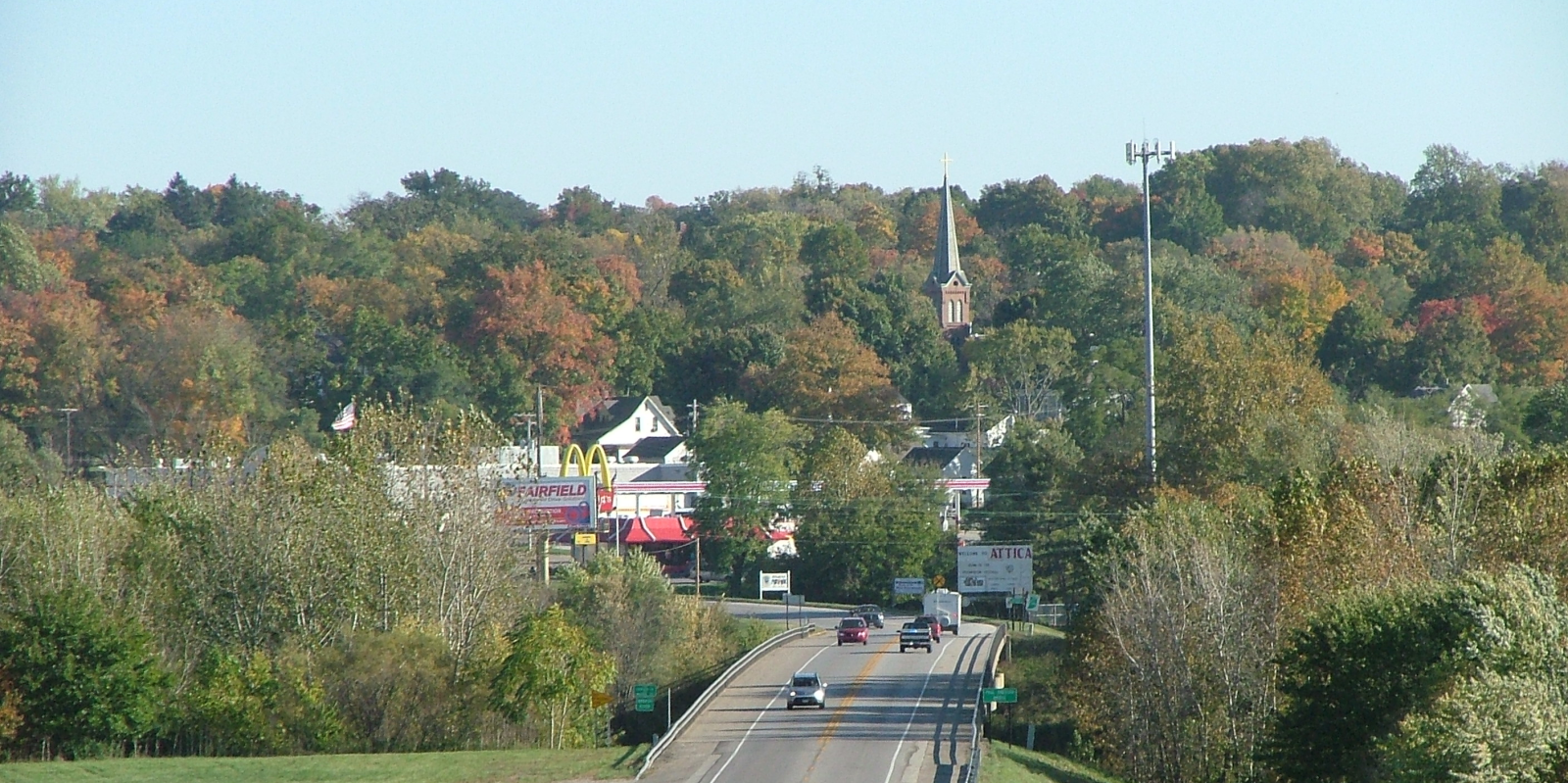
Attica, Indiana, where Evans developed a successful medical practice and strategized about opening an asylum and where his children were born.

He married Hannah Canby (1813–1850) and moved to West Milton, Ohio, in December 1838. He moved in July 1839 to Attica, Indiana, where he established a medical practice with Isaac Fisher. He practiced medicine and decided to build an asylum for the insane. The Evans family moved to Indianapolis in 1843 to better focus his lobbying efforts with the Indiana legislature. On January 15, 1844, a bill was passed that allowed for a state asylum to be established and Evans was named as one of the commissioners to have the asylum built. From his research on successful asylums, he determined that fresh food and water as well as a country setting were important. Beginning in 1846, he oversaw the construction and became the first superintendent of the Indiana Central State Hospital in 1845.

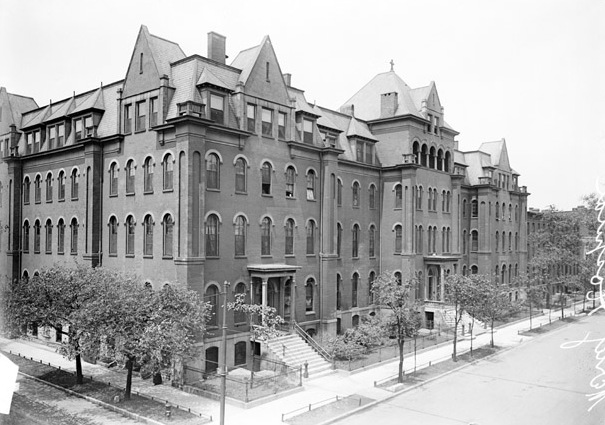
Evans was a founder of Lakeside Hospital, now called Mercy Hospital

He taught at Rush Medical College in Chicago and then moved there in 1848. He wrote about and developed a program for quarantine for cholera, which he spoke about to Congress. To reduce trauma that babies received through the use of forceps during birth, he invented an obstetrical extractor. He was owner and editor of a medical journal.

He was a founder of Lakeside Hospital and brought the Sisters of Mercy to staff the hospital, later named Mercy Hospital. He founded the Illinois State Medical Society. To ease seasickness during travel, he patented a suspended bed for ships in 1872 in England, France, the United States, and Italy.

=== Education ===
On June 4, 1850, he was one of the group of Methodists who founded Northwestern University, and was elected the first president of its board of trustees. While he lived in Evanston and later lived in Colorado, he donated money and land to fund the university's expenses after it opened in Evanston, Illinois, in November 1855.

Governor Evans donated land across from his house in Denver and in March 1864 obtained a charter from the territorial legislature to found the Territory's first college, the Colorado Seminary, which later became the University of Denver. Evans served as the Chairman of the University of Denver Board of Trustees until his death on July 2, 1897. Evans donated land in southeast Denver for a new University of Denver campus in 1890. The area is now called University Park.

=== Investments ===
Evans began investing in real estate, banking, and railroads in Chicago, which was foundational to his becoming wealthy. He helped establish the Fort Wayne and Chicago Railroad. Due to the success with his railroad and real estate investments, he no longer practiced medicine by the mid-1850s.

He helped establish the Denver Pacific Railroad to link to Union Pacific's transcontinental line at Cheyenne, Wyoming. He was elected president of Denver Pacific Railroad in 1868 and the railroad connection was completed in 1870. Denver, South Park and Pacific Railroad was incorporated in 1875, which brought rail service on two railroad lines to Colorado's mining region. In the 1880s, he built the Denver and New Orleans Railroad. Railroad service into Colorado helped Denver grow to more than 100,000 people by the 1880s from a frontier town of just a few thousand people.

=== Politics ===
He was an alderman for Chicago from 1853 to 1855. He focused on education, public health, and urban development. His wealth garnered him a fair amount of political power. He was one of the founders of the Illinois Republican Party due to his belief that slavery was wrong and became a personal friend of Abraham Lincoln after he campaigned for him in 1860.

Lincoln appointed Evans on March 26, 1862, as the second governor of the Territory of Colorado. Evans took his oath on April 11 in Washington, D.C., and he arrived in Denver by stagecoach on May 16. While he was governor, he helped establish the legal system, educational institutions, economy and infrastructure of the Colorado Territory. He also promoted Colorado's statehood, but its citizens overwhelmingly voted against it in September 1864 because the men of the state would be subject to military service for the Civil War and because the territory did not have the population to support running the state without the support of the federal government.

He was also the territory's superintendent of Indian Affairs, but did not consider how greatly Native Americans' lives were impacted by the way in which settlers thwarted their access to resources that they needed to survive. Evans' strategy was to create treaties that allocated land for white settlers from Native American tribes.

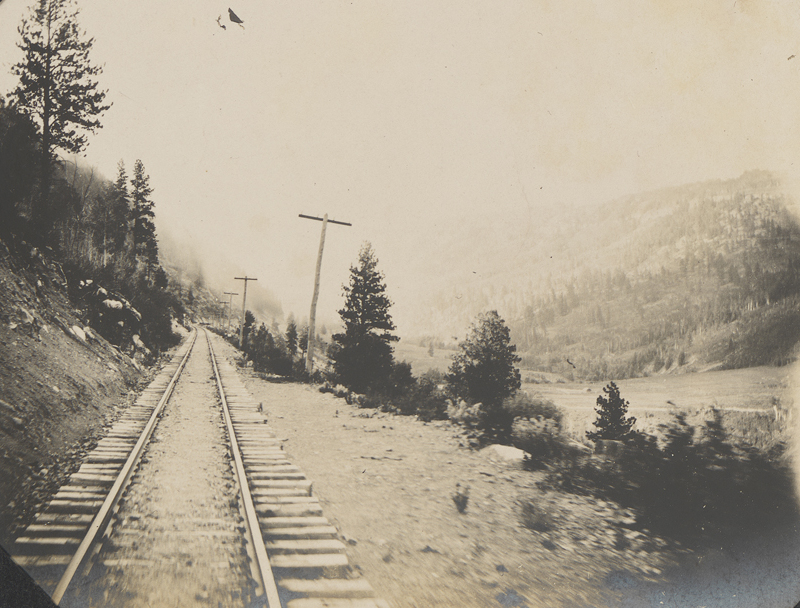
Railroad tracks

He believed that constructing railroads from the east and through Colorado was important for the territory's growth. He worked with survey crews to define the best routes. He worked on enforcing a treaty where Native Americans were assigned to reservations. Native American tribes—the Arapaho, Cheyenne, Kiowa, Ute people and Sioux—were indigenous to Colorado and hunted throughout the area. Hostilities grew as settlers came to Colorado and there was concern that the Native American people would join the Confederate army during the Civil War. He lobbied for railroads for Colorado in Washington, D.C., and he was instrumental in having the Union Pacific Railroad create a link to Denver, having a railroad line connect to San Francisco, and another line from Denver to Galveston, Texas, on the Gulf of Mexico.

=== Sand Creek massacre ===
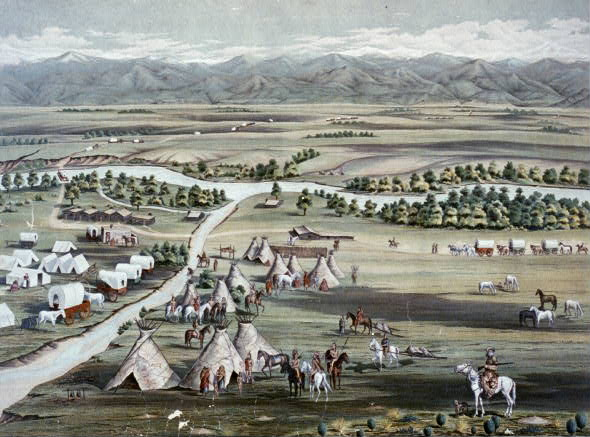
Denver, 1859. During its early history, Cherokee and Arapaho often camped in the area.

Citizens of Denver feared that tribes were gathering to over-run Denver. Evans issued a proclamation in August 1864 that authorized "all citizens of Colorado... to go in pursuit of all hostile Indians [and] kill and destroy all enemies of the country." Citing a lack of the ability to defend Denver because of the men fighting in the civil war, Evans ordered that so-called "friendly" "Indians" should present themselves to various forts for their "safety and protection," and those who did not were "hostile" and should be "pursued and destroyed." The offer of sanctuary was perfunctory; his ultimate goal was to eliminate Native American activity in eastern Colorado Territory entirely, in hopes that this would help him earn a seat in the U.S. Senate.

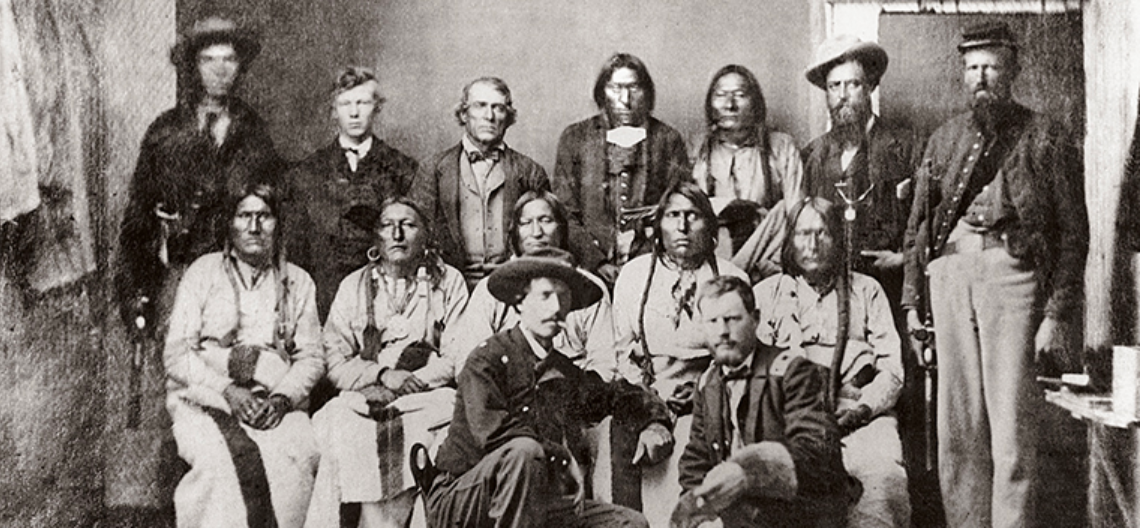
Cheyenne and Arapaho Delegation, Camp Weld, September 28, 1864

Chief Black Kettle had told Native Americans that it was important that they make peace with the settlers or they would be crushed. He met with Lincoln and was very proud to have been given a large American flag in the fall of 1864. Only a few Native Americans, including Black Kettle, were able to accept Evans' offer of amnesty; most of those who attempted approach Fort Lyon were turned away at gunpoint, which Evans characterized as them "refusing" amnesty.

That year, Governor Evans appointed John Chivington as Colonel of the Colorado Volunteers. Chivington and his men knew of the band of Cheyenne and Arapaho led by Black Kettle, who had reported to Fort Lyon as ordered by Evans but left when there were no provisions for them there. Black Kettle and his group then camped along Sand Creek in the east central part of the Territory. This area was within Arapaho and Cheyenne territory according to the Fort Wise Treaty of 1861.

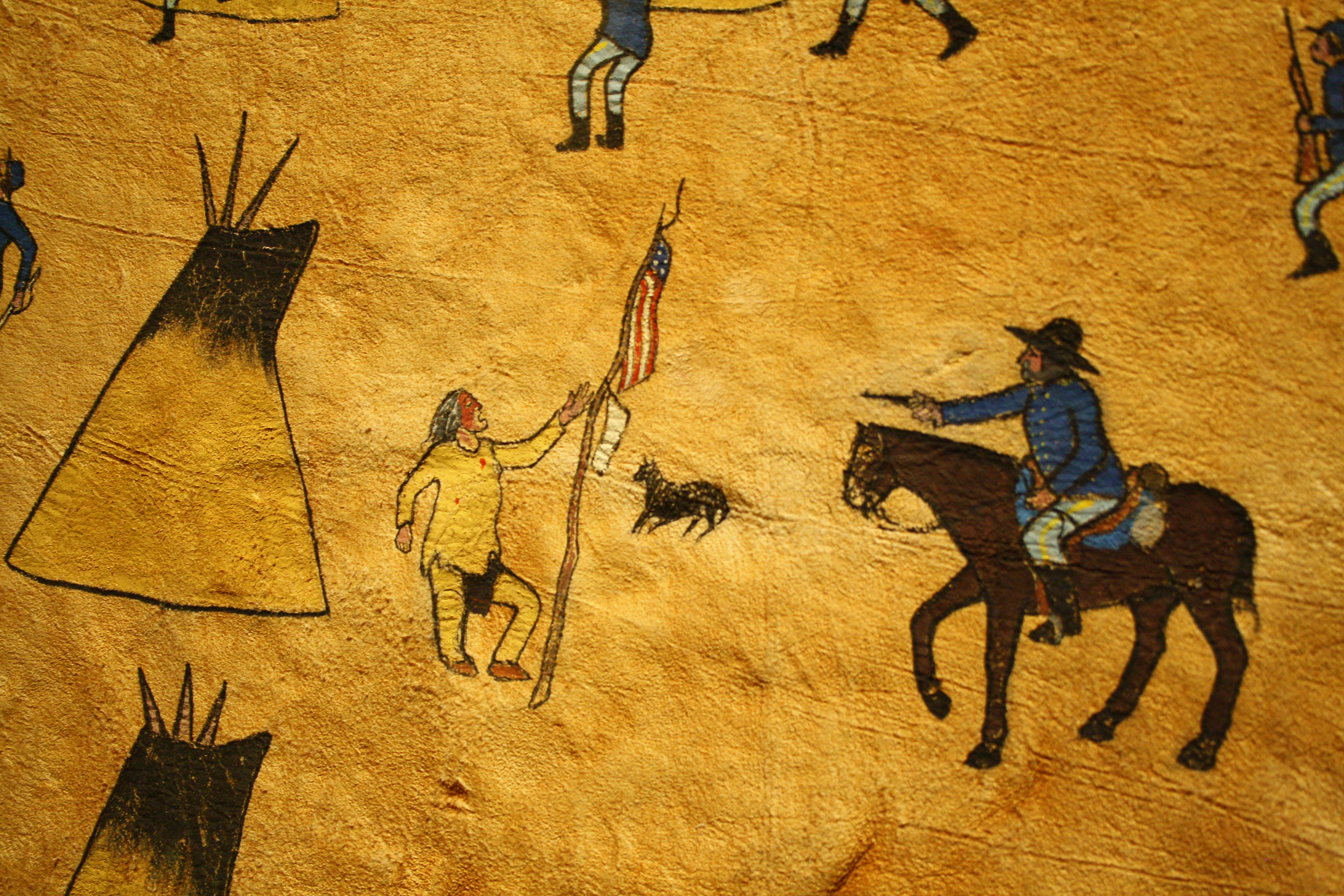
Black Kettle at Sand Creek, Buffalo Bill Center of the West

On November 29, 1864, Colonel Chivington ordered 700 cavalry troopers to attack Black Kettle's peaceful encampment, when most of the men were away hunting. They killed about 28 unarmed men and 105 women and children and wounded many more during the Sand Creek massacre. A few Cheyenne, including Black Kettle, were able to escape. (Note: The total number killed at Sand Creek is also stated to be 150 or 165 Native Americans or 150 to 200 Native Americans.) Governor Evans decorated Chivington and his men for their "valor in subduing the savages."

Two U.S. Congressional committees and one military committee were formed to investigate the massacre, finding guilt on the part of the U.S. government in 1865. (Note: Evans testified before the committees and was accused of lying to cover up his involvement. Noted temperance leader and reformer Frances Willard's brother, Oliver Willard, who served as pastor at the Methodist Episcopal Church in Denver from 1862 to 1866, was friends with and supporter of both John Evans and John Chivington, who led the attack. Evans and Chivington were members of the Denver church.) Evans was accused of a coverup. (Note: According to a study by scholars of Northwestern University and other universities, Evans was not aware of a plan to attack Sand Creek and considered the people there to be friendly Native Americans. He committed moral failure by not advancing the interests of the Native Americans of Colorado, helping to create a hostile climate that led up to the attack, defending the attack, and not condemning the Sand Creek massacre after it occurred.) He was forced to resign as Governor in 1865 and Chivington's political ambitions were ruined.

== Personal life ==
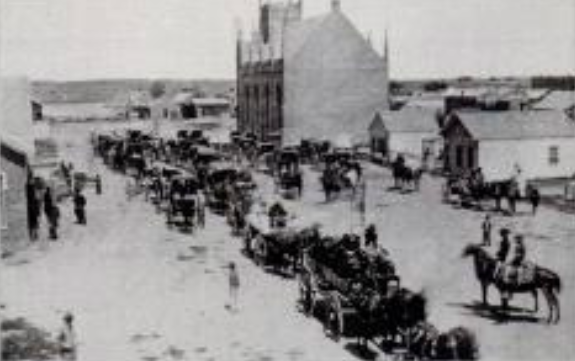
John Evans House, Denver, about 1870s. When the Evans first came to Denver, settlers established themselves in tents and simple low-roofed cabins. Then, they constructed simple frame houses. A house of brick was a rarity in Denver's early years.

Evans married Hannah Canby in 1838. They settled in Attica, Indiana, where sons Joseph and Davis were born, in 1839 and 1841 respectively. Evans, raised in the Quaker faith, converted to Methodism, after hearing a talk by Matthew Simpson, a Methodist Episcopal minister. He became a member of the Freemasons. His daughter Josephine was born and his sons died while in Attica. She was the only child of four children born to Evans and his wife to survive childhood. Hannah contracted tuberculosis soon after the family moved to Chicago in 1848. She died on October 9, 1850. Hannah Canby Evans and their sons are buried in the old cemetery in Attica.

On August 18, 1853, he married for the second time to Margaret Patten Gray. She was the sister-in-law of a fellow trustee of Northwestern University. In 1855, he moved to a large house in Evanston, Illinois, which was named for him in 1854. In 1855, Evans and his wife had a son, William Gray Evans, whose efforts led to the development of Moffat Tunnel and the Denver Tramway Company. He came to Denver in 1862 and had a house at 14th and Arapahoe.

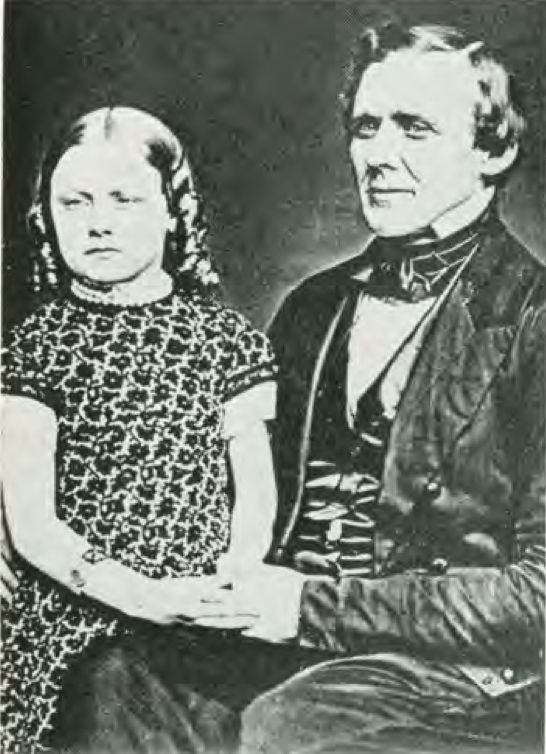
John Evans with daughter Josephine, c. 1859

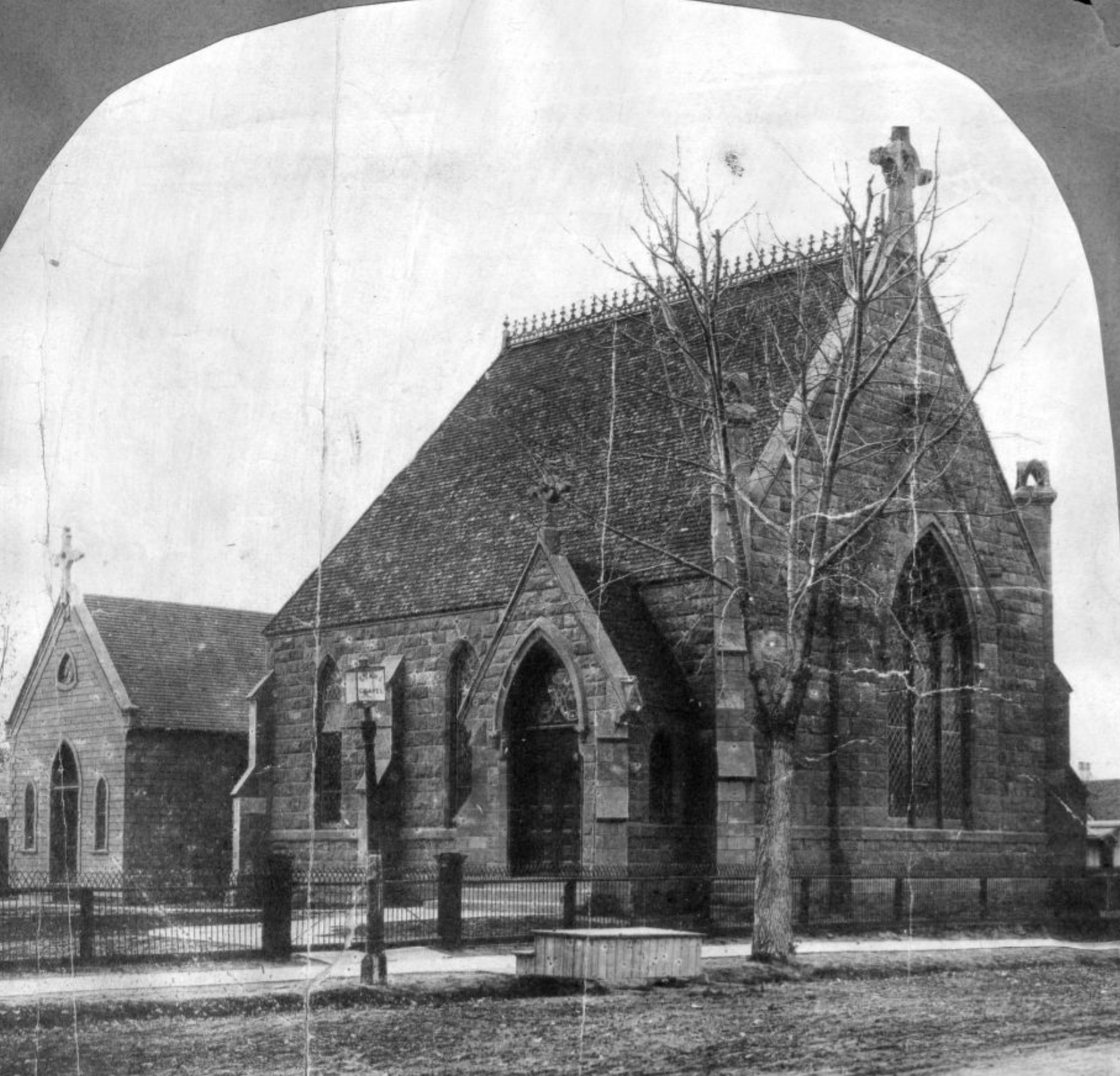
Evans Memorial Chapel at original location, c. 1880–1888, now on the campus of the University of Denver

In 1871, their daughter Anne was born. She played a key role in the development of the Central City Opera, Civic Center Park, the Denver Public Library, and the Denver Art Museum.

John's daughter, Josephine, married Samuel Hitt Elbert. She died as a young woman and Evans built the Evans Memorial Chapel in her memory. In 1868, John Evans and Samuel Elbert purchased land near Evergreen, Colorado, for a summer retreat and ranch called Evans–Elbert Ranch.

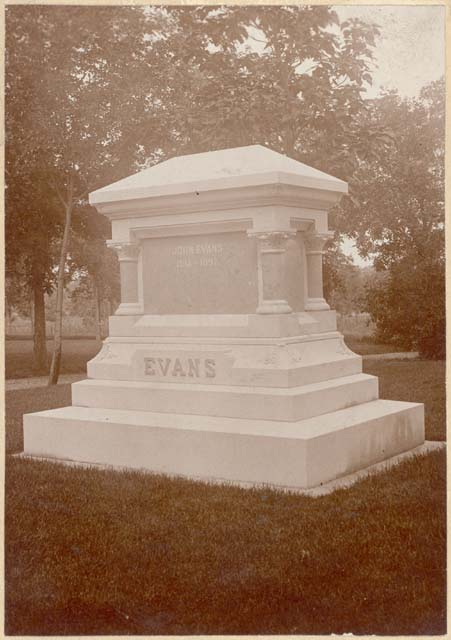
John Evans' grave marker in Denver's Riverside Cemetery

Evans was in poor health in the last year of his life and his wife became the executor of his estate in November 1896. He died in Denver on July 2 or 3 in 1897.

== Legacy and honors ==
John Evans' daughter, Josephine Evans Elbert, was married to Samuel Hitt Elbert, the sixth governor of the Territory of Colorado from 1873 to 1874. Mount Evans (later renamed Mount Blue Sky in 2023) was named in Evans’ honor, and Mount Elbert is named in honor of his son-in-law, Samuel Hitt Elbert.

He is also the namesake of Evanston, Illinois and Evans, Colorado.

In World War II, the United States Liberty ship SS John Evans was named in his honor.

In 1963, he was inducted into the Hall of Great Westerners of the National Cowboy & Western Heritage Museum.

During the 21st century, Evans' legacy came under renewed scrutiny for his beliefs regarding Native Americans. Colorado State Historian David Halaas said, "When it came to Indians, Evans believed they didn't have souls, that they were heathen savages, they were infernal—all words that he used to describe Indian people."

== See also ==
- History of Colorado
- Law and government of Colorado
- List of governors of Colorado
- Territory of Colorado
- University of Denver
- Northwestern University
- Silas Soule (Sand Creek whistleblower)
