= Byers–Evans House =

Historic house in Colorado, United States

- U.S. National Register of Historic Places
- U.S. Historic district – Contributing property
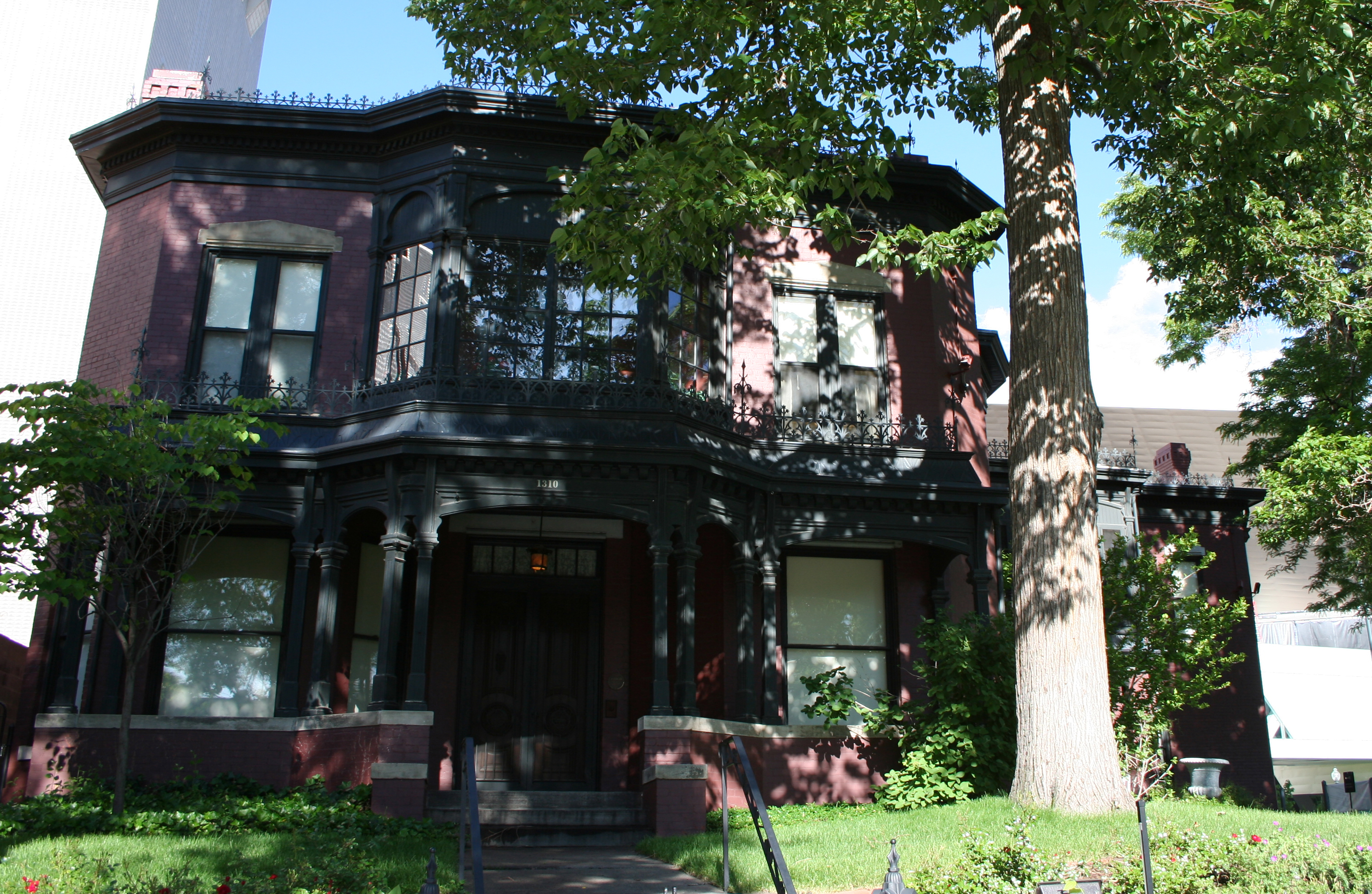

- Location within Colorado Location within the United States
- Interactive map showing the location of Byers-Evans House
- Location: 1310 Bannock St., Denver, Colorado
- Coordinates: 39°44′14″N 104°59′22″W
- Area: less than one acre
- Built: 1880
- Architectural style: Late Victorian, Victorian Eclectic
- Part of: Civic Center Historic District (ID74002348)
- NRHP reference No.: 70000158

Significant dates
- Added to NRHP: August 25, 1970
- Designated CP: February 27, 1974

The Byers–Evans House is a historic house museum in Denver, Colorado, United States. It is the home of History Colorado's Center for Colorado Women's History. It has also been known as Evans House and is a Denver Landmark under that name. It is listed on the National Register of Historic Places as a contributing building in the Civic Center Historic District.

== History ==
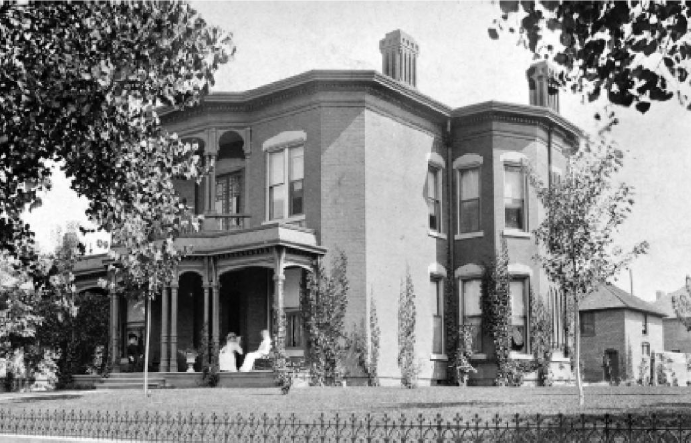
Byers–Evans House, Denver, about 1889, when the photograph was taken of Evans family members. It was the home of William Gray Evans beginning 1889. In 1900, Margaret Gray Evans and her daughter Anne Evans moved into the house.

The Byers–Evans house was built in 1883 by William Byers, the founder of the Rocky Mountain News and was sold to William Gray Evans in 1889. It is an Italianate style house which had several additions made to it over the years. William Evans lived in the home with his wife Cornelia Lunt Gray and their four children, John, Josephine, Margaret and Katharine. William's mother, Margaret Patten Gray Evans, former first lady of Colorado, moved into the home in 1900 with her unmarried daughter, Anne Evans. Members of the Evans family continued to live in the home until 1981.

It was listed on the National Register of Historic Places in 1970.

It was listed again on the National Register in 1974 as a contributing building within the Civic Center Historic District.

The house was donated to History Colorado in 1981, along with the entire contents of the house. The house has been restored to the 1912–1924 period and includes approximately 90% of the original furniture, glassware, china, and other household items belonging to the Evans family.

== Center for Colorado Women's History ==
The Center for Colorado Women's History is located in Denver, Colorado, at 1310 Bannock St, directly behind the Denver Art Museum. The Center focuses on scholarship, research, lectures, tours and exhibits that expand the understanding and collective memory of the history of women in Colorado. Guided house tours are offered; portions of the museum may not be viewed without a tour. The museum is administered by History Colorado.
