= Anne Evans Mountain Home =

- U.S. National Register of Historic Places
- Location: Address restricted, Evergreen, Colorado
- Architect: Burnham Hoyt
- NRHP reference No.: 91001530
- Added to NRHP: January 28, 1992

Anne Evans Mountain Home is a cabin that was built near Evergreen, Colorado by Anne Evans on the Evans–Elbert Ranch with a view of the Rocky Mountains. It is located in at an elevation of about 8,200 feet the Upper Bear Creek watershed in eastern Clear Creek County, Colorado. Anne Evans chose a location on a hill with views of Mount Evans, named for her father in 1895 and renamed to Mount Blue Sky in 2023.

Likely designed initially by Jock Spence, it was built in 1911. It is a "particularly distinguished examples of Colorado mountain cottage. It is built of vertical logs and the foundation was of rustic stone. It was built in a T-shape and was 3,200 square feet. There are four bedrooms, two sleeping porches, two bathrooms, and an entry hall on the upper floor. The lower floor is accessed by a wide staircase of peeled logs. The lower floor has a living room with a large stone fireplace, a kitchen, and servants' quarters. Evans hired Burnham Hoyt, a Denver architect, in 1911 to rebuild the roof with stone tiles and timbers. It retained its charm as a rustic Colorado mountain cottage. An Art Deco eagle motif was designed for the gable ends, fire screen and windows by Josephine Hurlburt, an artist who was also her friend. The living room fireplace with inlaid with a painting by Allen Tupper True. Evans decorated the cottage with Native American art, including rugs, pottery, and baskets.

It was reported on in the Rocky Mountain News and in the June 1917 edition of House Beautiful magazine. It remained in the Evans family until 1990. Frederick and Jan Mayer, art collectors from Denver, purchased the house and restored it so that it looked very similar to its original appearance.

The house is listed on the National Register of Historic Places, and is privately owned.
