= Evans–Elbert Ranch =

- U.S. National Register of Historic Places
- Location within Colorado
- Location: Upper Bear Creek Road, Idaho Springs, Colorado
- Coordinates: 39°39′10″N 105°28′49″W
- NRHP reference No.: 80000885
- Added to NRHP: September 11, 1980

Evans–Elbert Ranch, also called the Elbert-Austin Ranch, was built as a 300-acre family retreat and ranch in Upper Bear Creek near Evergreen in Clear Creek County, Colorado by John Evans, Colorado's second territorial governor. Covering most of Corral Creek, Metz, and Vance valleys, it was a mountain cattle ranch.

In 1868, Evans and his son-in-law Samuel Hitt Elbert, who also became a Territorial governor, purchased more than 300 acres from John Vance, a homesteader. They became interested in the area after they took a camping trip in the Upper Bear Creek area and enjoyed the views, timber, grass, and game. It was called Kuhlborne Ranch by the family. They built a large rustic house called the cottage. There was a house on the property that was inhabited by the ranch foreman. Over time, more land was purchased and the ranch grew to several thousand acres.

During the summer, the Evans family used the ranch to enjoy the valleys and mountains and to escape the heat of Denver. Anne, the youngest child of John Evans, led the ranch's development after Samuel Elbert and John Evans died in the late 1890s.

In 1908, Louise Elbert Everett, Samuel Elbert's niece, purchased much of the ranch land. A rustic-style residence made of stone and logs, designed by architect J. Christopher Jensen, was built for her in 1908. The house was built by a local contractor, Jock Spence. In 1911, Anne Evans built the Anne Evans Mountain Home for herself.
