= Samuel Hitt Elbert =

American attorney, politician, and judge in Colorado (1833–1899)

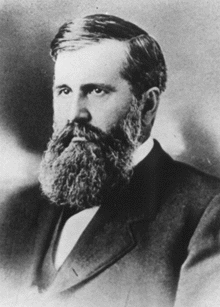

6th Governor of the Territory of Colorado
- In office April 17,1873 – July 26,1874
- Preceded by: Edward M. McCook
- Succeeded by: Edward M. McCook

Personal details
- Born: April 3, 1833 Logan County, Ohio
- Died: November 27, 1899 (aged 66) Galveston, Texas
- Resting place: Riverside Cemetery (Denver)
- Party: Republican
- Spouse: Josephine Evans Elbert (m.1865)
- Children: 1
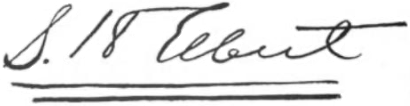
- Signature

Samuel Hitt Elbert (April 3, 1833 – November 27, 1899) was an attorney in the Nebraska Territory before settling in the Colorado Territory. He served as the second secretary of the Territory of Colorado from 1862 to 1866 and he served as the sixth Governor of the Territory of Colorado from 1873 to 1874. After Colorado statehood, he was a justice of the Colorado Supreme Court from 1876 to 1888 and was chief justice from 1879 to 1882.

He was married to Josephine Evans, the daughter of Territorial Governor John Evans. She died of tuberculosis following the birth and death of her only child; the Evans Memorial Chapel was built by her father in her memory.

== Early life and education ==
Elbert was born in Logan County, Ohio. His parents were Achsa Hitt, the daughter of Rev. Samuel Hitt, (Note: Achsa's father, Rev. Samuel Hitt, was a Methodist minister who may be the Samuel Hitt of the Samuel M. Hitt House.) and John Downs Elbert, a physician and surgeon. He descends from early colonists and Huguenots. His great-grandfather, Dr. John Lodman Elbert, was a surgeon during the American Revolution.

He moved with his family to the Iowa Territory in 1840. He attended public school, where the curriculum included agriculture. He studied at Ohio Wesleyan University where he was a member of Beta Theta Pi. He graduated in 1854 and continued to study law at a leading law firm in Dayton, Ohio, for two years. He was then admitted to the bar in Ohio in 1856. He moved to Plattsmouth in the Nebraska Territory in the spring of 1857 to practice law. (Note: The town is also stated to be Plattsburgh. And he is also said to have moved to Nebraska in 1856.)

== Career ==
In Nebraska, Elbert became active in the newly formed Republican Party. He attended the Republican National Convention in 1860 in Chicago, where Abraham Lincoln was nominated for president. He became acquainted with John Evans and Lincoln at the convention. He later also attended the 1864 National Union National Convention where Lincoln was renominated.

He left Nebraska for Colorado in 1862. Elbert was appointed Secretary of the Colorado Territory that year by Abraham Lincoln. He occasionally stood in for Governor Evans when needed. He served from 1862 until 1867 under Governors John Evans and Alexander Cummings. He dealt with hostilities between settlers and Native Americans. During the Civil War, he helped form and then mobilized the 2nd and 3rd Colorado regiments for the war effort. He helped organize the Republican Party in the Colorado Territory.

He formed the law firm Charles & Elbert with J. Q. Charles. He was elected to the territorial legislature in 1869. He was made secretary one year later. He became the chairman of the Republican central committee for Colorado in 1872.

Elbert was appointed as the sixth governor of the Colorado Territory by President Ulysses S. Grant in 1873. President Grant became the first U.S. President to visit Colorado that summer. The President stayed at Governor Elbert's home. Elbert and Grant visited Central City, and met with a group of Ute leaders to create a treaty (Brunot Treaty of 1873) that would allow some of the Ute's land to be accessible to railroad and mining companies. As governor, he promoted irrigation methods and founded the Western Irrigation Conference, which wrote water laws to ensure viable agriculture industries in Colorado. Governor Elbert served until his predecessor, Edward M. McCook, was reappointed Governor in the spring of 1874, but was not confirmed by Congress until July.

Elbert spent a year in Europe, during which he became aware of the political and social conditions there. Colorado became a state in 1876. Elbert was elected to the Colorado Supreme Court in 1876 and served until 1888. During that time, he served as the chief justice of the Supreme Court from 1879 to 1883. (Note: He is also said to have served to 1882.) He resigned in 1888 due to his poor health, and went abroad.

He received an honorary LLD from Ohio Wesleyan University in 1880.

== Personal life ==
After a two-year courtship, Elbert married 18 year old Josephine Evans in June 1865. She was the daughter of Territorial Governor John Evans and Hannah Pedrick Canby. (Note: Josephine was born on September 30, 1844, in Attica, Indiana. Her mother, Hannah Canby Evans, died of consumption on October 9, 1850. Josephine was the only surviving child, her three brothers died in infancy. She was raised in Attica, Chicago and Evanston, Illinois, and went to Wilbraham Wesleyan Academy in Wilbraham, Massachusetts. She then moved to the Colorado Territory on January 29, 1864. Her father and stepmother Gray of Bowdoinham, Maine had established a home there in 1862 after Evans accepted the position of Governor of the Colorado Territory. He had accepted the position hoping that the climate would improve Josephine's poor health due to tuberculosis. She met Elbert in 1863.) They were married by Bishop Matthew Simpson. George Armstrong Custer was the best man.

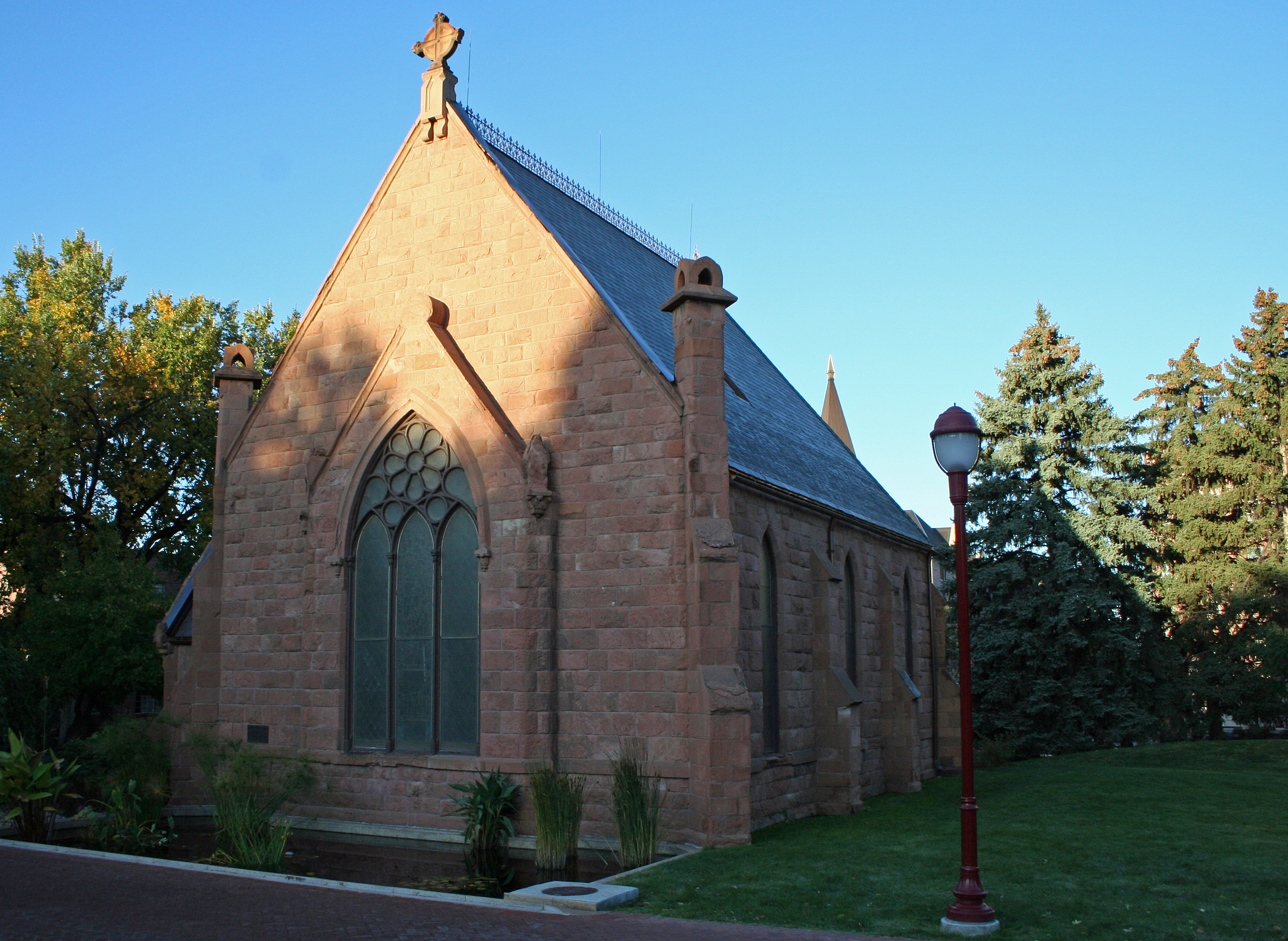
Evans Memorial Chapel built by John Evans after the death of his daughter, Josephine

The Elberts lived in a red brick house on E Street, now 14th Street. Josephine gave birth to their only child, John Evans Elbert about late March 1868. He died on August 10, 1868. Josephine, who had consumption (tuberculosis), died in October 1868. Her father built the Evans Memorial Chapel in her memory in 1878. It is located at the University of Denver campus.

After having been in failing health for some time, Elbert died on November 27, 1899, in Galveston, Texas and is buried at Riverside Cemetery in Denver, as are Josephine and their son John.

== Legacy ==
Elbert County, Colorado; Elbert, Colorado; and Mount Elbert, the highest peak in the Rocky Mountains, are named in honor of Elbert. Grateful miners named Mount Elbert after the governor because he facilitated a treaty with the Ute tribe, which opened up more than 3,000,000 acres (12,000 km^{2}) of Indian reservation to mining and railroad activity.

== See also ==
- History of Colorado
- Law and Government of Colorado
