= William Byers =

American politician (1831–1903)

William Newton Byers
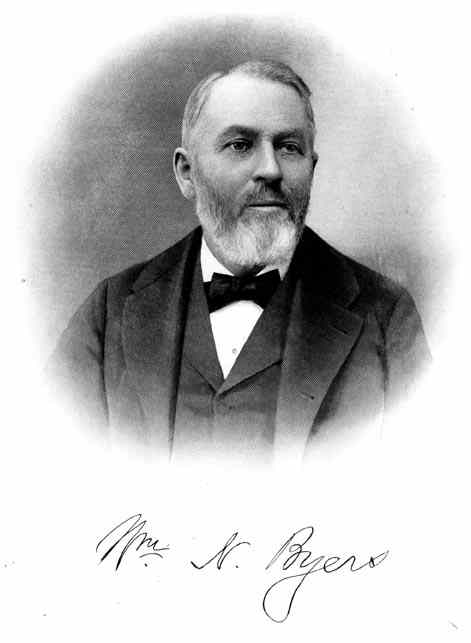
- William Newton Byers
- Born: February 22, 1831; Madison County, Ohio, U.S.
- Died: March 25, 1903 (aged 72); Denver, Colorado, U.S.
- Resting place: Fairmount Cemetery
- Occupation: surveyor
- Spouse: Elizabeth (Sumner) Byers

William Newton Byers (February 22, 1831, in Madison County, Ohio – March 25, 1903) was a founding figure of Omaha, Nebraska, serving as the first deputy surveyor of the Nebraska Territory, on the first Omaha City Council, and as a member of the first Nebraska Territorial Legislature.

He was also an early settler of Denver, Colorado, and the founder and editor of the Rocky Mountain News in Denver. He was married to Elizabeth Sumner Byers who was a prominent woman in Denver for her philanthropic activities and club memberships, such as the Denver Woman's Press Club. They lived in the Byers–Evans House, now a museum that is listed on the National Register of Historic Places.

== Early life ==
Byers was born in Madison County, Ohio, to Moses and Mary. In 1851, he moved with his parents to Iowa, and then to Omaha, Nebraska, as the city was being laid out in 1854.

== Career ==
In Omaha, he became the first deputy surveyor in the Nebraska Territory, in which capacity he created the first official plat of Omaha. A partnership with Andrew J. Poppleton led Byers to make the first map of the city of Omaha. Soon afterwards he became a member of the first city council, and a member of the first session of the Nebraska Territorial Legislature, convened January 16, 1855, in Omaha.

In 1859 Byers moved to Denver to take advantage of recent gold strikes in the area. Taking the printing presses of the defunct Bellevue Gazette by oxcart, he and J. H. Kellom were the authors of a handbook to the gold fields, published that year. Robert W. Furnas, in 1859 associated with the Nebraska Advertiser, later recalled that Byers had bought the equipment of the defunct newspaper and had it taken by ox team to Denver, then in western Kansas Territory, where he used it in the publication of the Rocky Mountain News. The Rocky Mountain News was the first newspaper printed in Colorado; it continued publication until 2009.

In 1863 Byers purchased Hot Sulphur Springs in northern Colorado from a Minnesota Sioux woman in a shady deal, causing the real owners, the Ute tribe, to unsuccessfully sue. Byers' plans to turn it into "America's Switzerland" were foiled by the failure of the railroad to arrive until 1928.

Byers wrote numerous editorials justifying the 1864 Sand Creek Massacre, maintaining even years later that "Sand Creek saved Colorado, and taught the Indians the most salutary lesson they had ever learned."

== Personal life ==
He was married to Elizabeth Byers who came to Denver during the Pikes Peak Gold Rush when it was a small settlement of tents. It was primarily inhabited by rough men who frequented the saloons. She had rough experiences during her 60 years in Denver. She lost both of her children with William. One of their houses was lost to fire, and another was flooded. She was active in establishment of charitable organizations in Denver. In 1860, she founded the Ladies United Aid Society. With Frances Wisebart Jacobs and Margaret Gray Evans, it was reorganized in 1872 to the Ladies Relief Society. One year later, Elizabeth Byers and Margaret Gray Evans founded the Old Ladies Home. To care for homeless girls, Byers established the Home of Good Shepherds in 1885.

Upon moving to Denver he built and lived in several mansions, including the one now known as the Byers-Evans House. The Byers-Evans House is now a museum, and is located next to the Denver Art Museum in downtown Denver. In 1891 Byers and his wife relocated to a mansion they built on a large tract of land at 171 S. Washington St. Byers was an avid horticulturalist and planted a wide variety of tree species on his property; he used the majority of the land plot for personal farming and gardening. After the Byers couple vacated their mansion and farm, the house was demolished and the property was dedicated to the Denver Public Schools in 1921. Some of the trees he planted may still be on the property today, around the periphery of DSST Cedar Middle and High Schools. The school was originally named William N. Byers Junior High School, then DSST: Byers, until 2023 when the name was changed in consideration of Byers' support for the Sand Creek Massacre. A branch of the Denver Public Library had been named for Byers, but it was renamed in 2021, also in consideration of the Sand Creek Massacre. Byers had a mistress, Hattie Sancomb, who tried to kill him. It created a scandal, and ended his political career, but Elizabeth stood by her husband.

As a former territorial surveyor, it is not surprising that Byers was an accomplished outdoorsman. While living in Denver, he spent considerable time in the mountains. In 1863, the artist Albert Bierstadt asked him to serve as a guide, and he led Bierstadt on an expedition from Idaho Springs, Colorado, to the summit of the mountain Bierstadt named Mount Rosalie, later known as Mount Evans, and later as Mount Blue Sky. Bierstadt's masterpiece Storm in the rocky mountains was based on that trip.

William N. Byers died on March 25, 1903, and was buried in Fairmount Cemetery in Denver, Colorado.

== Legacy ==
A 1964 episode of the Western anthology series Death Valley Days purported to be the story of the establishment of the Rocky Mountain News, with Byers portrayed by actor Jerome Courtland.
