= Denver Tramway =

Streetcar system in Denver, Colorado, US

Coordinates: 39.7510°N 104.9942°W

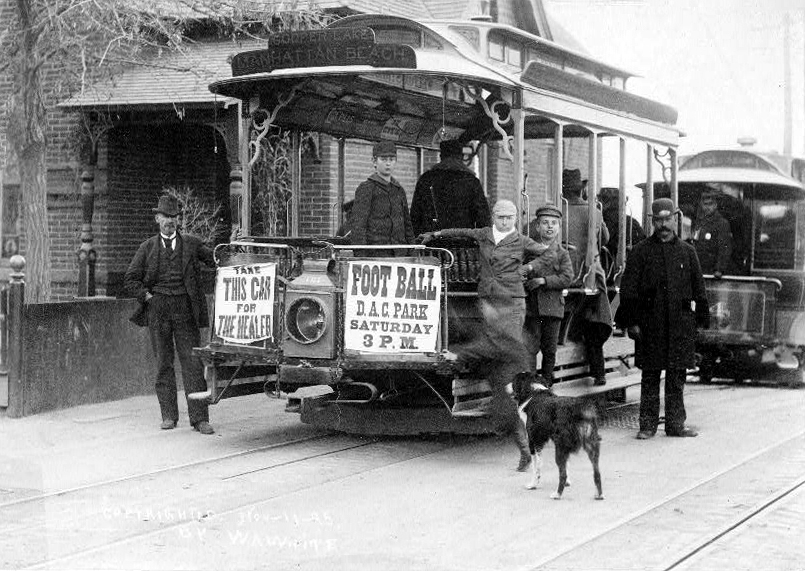
Denver cable car, 1895

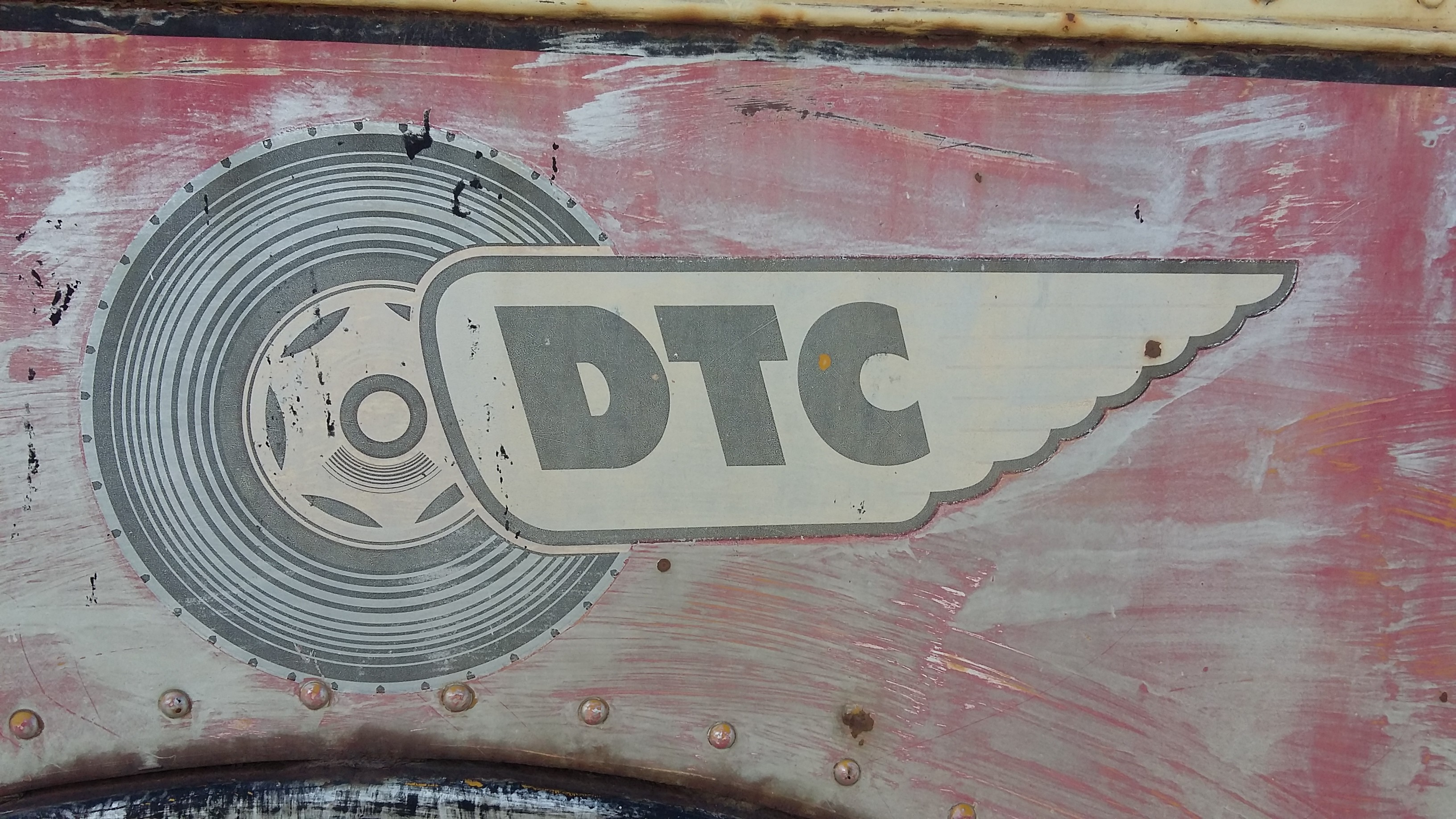
Denver Tramway Corporation logo on trolleybus No. 553

The Denver Tramway, operating in Denver, Colorado, was a streetcar system incorporated in 1886. The tramway was unusual for a number of reasons: the term "tramway" is generally not used in the United States, and it is not known why the company was named as such. The track was 3 ft 6 in (1,067 mm) narrow gauge, an unusual gauge in the United States (although streetcars in Los Angeles also used this gauge), but in general use by railways in Japan, southern Africa, New Zealand, and Queensland, Australia.

The tramway made use of a variety of types of streetcars, including conduit cars (until 1888), cable cars (until 1900), and trolley cars (until 1950). At the height of its trolley operations, the tramway owned more than 160 miles (260 km) of track and operated over 250 streetcars. By the end of trolley service, only 64 streetcars were still in use.

After streetcar operation ceased in 1950 the tramway operated trolley coaches and conventional buses, but continued to use the Tramway name. In May 1971, the Denver Tramway Corporation ceased operation of Denver's transit system, selling its assets and operations to the City and County of Denver. The city continued those operations under the name Denver Metro Transit until 1974, when they were assumed by the voter-approved Regional Transportation District (RTD).

== History ==
=== Precursor to Denver Tramway ===
In 1867, the Denver Horse Railroad Company was incorporated and given "a period of thirty five years the sole and exclusive right and privilege of constructing a horse railroad in the city of Denver and the additions thereto." In 1871 a horsecar line was finally built in West Denver, from Seventh and Larimer to the Five Points neighborhood, opening December 17. The Denver Horse Railroad Company was renamed the Denver City Railway Company in 1872. By 1877 the company employed eighteen men, had thirty-two horses and twelve cars. In that year it carried 392,420 passengers over its eight miles of road.

In 1883, Denver City Railway Company changed hands. The railway was expanded and much of the old track was relaid with heavy steel rails. Clyde Lyndon King, in his doctoral thesis The history of the government of Denver with special reference to its relations with public service corporations, writes, "by the opening of the second half of the period, Denver's street railway service was as good as that in any city of its size."

Land speculators, not served by the existing railway and believing that they needed street railway service to get better value from their real estate, launched the Denver Electric and Cable Railway Company in 1885. Incorporated for fifty years, this service was to run on electricity or by cable. Fearing these new methods would prove unprofitable, the Denver Electric and Cable Railway Company, petitioned for and were given the right to use horse-power, despite the Denver City Railway Company's exclusive horse railroad franchise. Some of the initial investors then spun off a new company, The Denver Railway Association, which was given the rights to horse railways. This move was very unpopular with both the Denver City Railway Company and the remaining investors in the Denver Electric and Cable Railway Company. Thus the Denver Railway Association was reincorporated and the newly consolidated company renamed the Denver Tramway.

=== Early experimentations ===
The Denver Tramway experimented with a direct-current series conduit car system connected to an underground electrified line in 1886, but it was expensive, complicated and trouble-prone. After a year of operation it was not making any profits and the Denver Tramway switched to horse-power. After losing a lawsuit to the Denver City Railway Company, they switched over to cable-power and finished their first line using it at the end of 1888.

The Denver City Railway Company, finally having serious competition, also switched to cable-power and reorganized as the Denver City Cable Railway Company. They secured a contract from the city to build a viaduct over the South Platte River and began to aggressively expand. Both the Denver Tramway and the Denver City Cable Railway Company were well equipped and determined to drive the other out of business.

In 1888, the first practical electric street railway was installed by Frank J. Sprague in Richmond, Virginia. His improved designs for a spring-loaded trolley pole, for mounting streetcar motors, and for better gear designs finally made the electric streetcar profitable. Taking note of this success, the Denver Tramway decided to build an electric street car line into South Denver and set up a subsidiary, the South Denver Cable Railway, to operate it. This line proved to be so successful that the Denver Tramway decided to electrify all of its cable lines even though they had years of life left in them. King writes, "The operating expense of the Tramway when using electricity was 2.2 cents per passenger as compared with an operating expense of 3.4 cents for each passenger carried on its competitor's cable system."

Denver Tramway began to expand into the suburbs and buy up independent operators such as the Denver and Berkeley Rapid Transit Company and the Highlands Street Railway Company which operated in Berkeley and Highland respectively. While continuing to buy up competitors, the Tramway company also continued to lay track and by the end of this period it owned and operated over a hundred miles of electrified track and was firmly entrenched in political circles.

=== Expansion and political connections ===
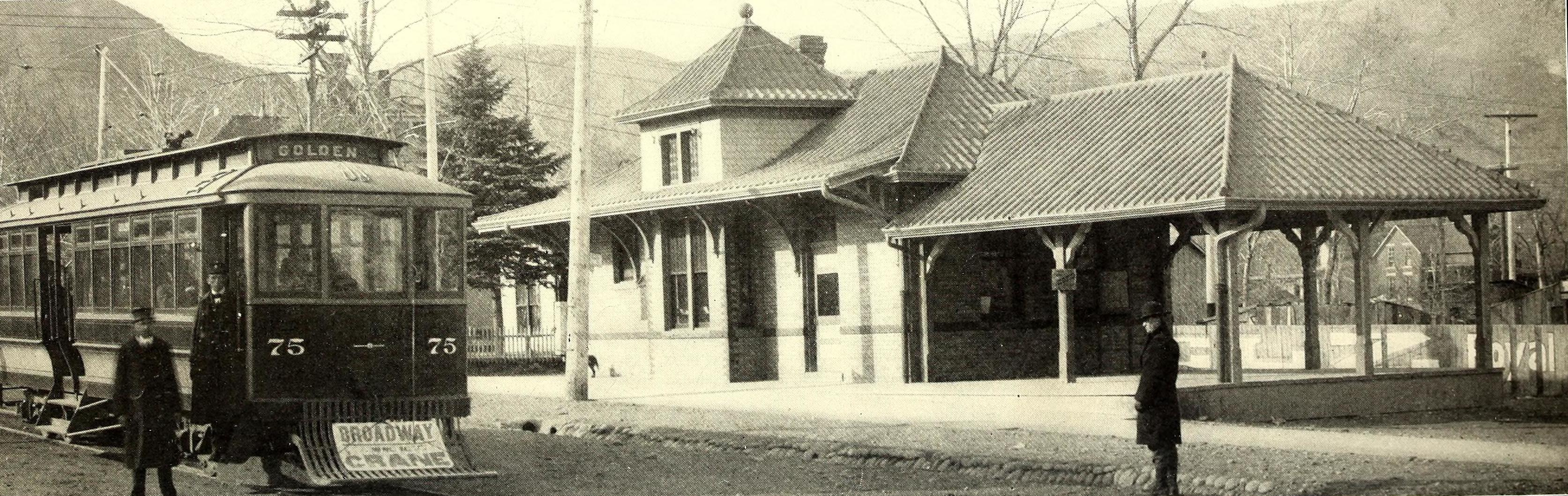
The Denver Tramway at Golden depot, 1909

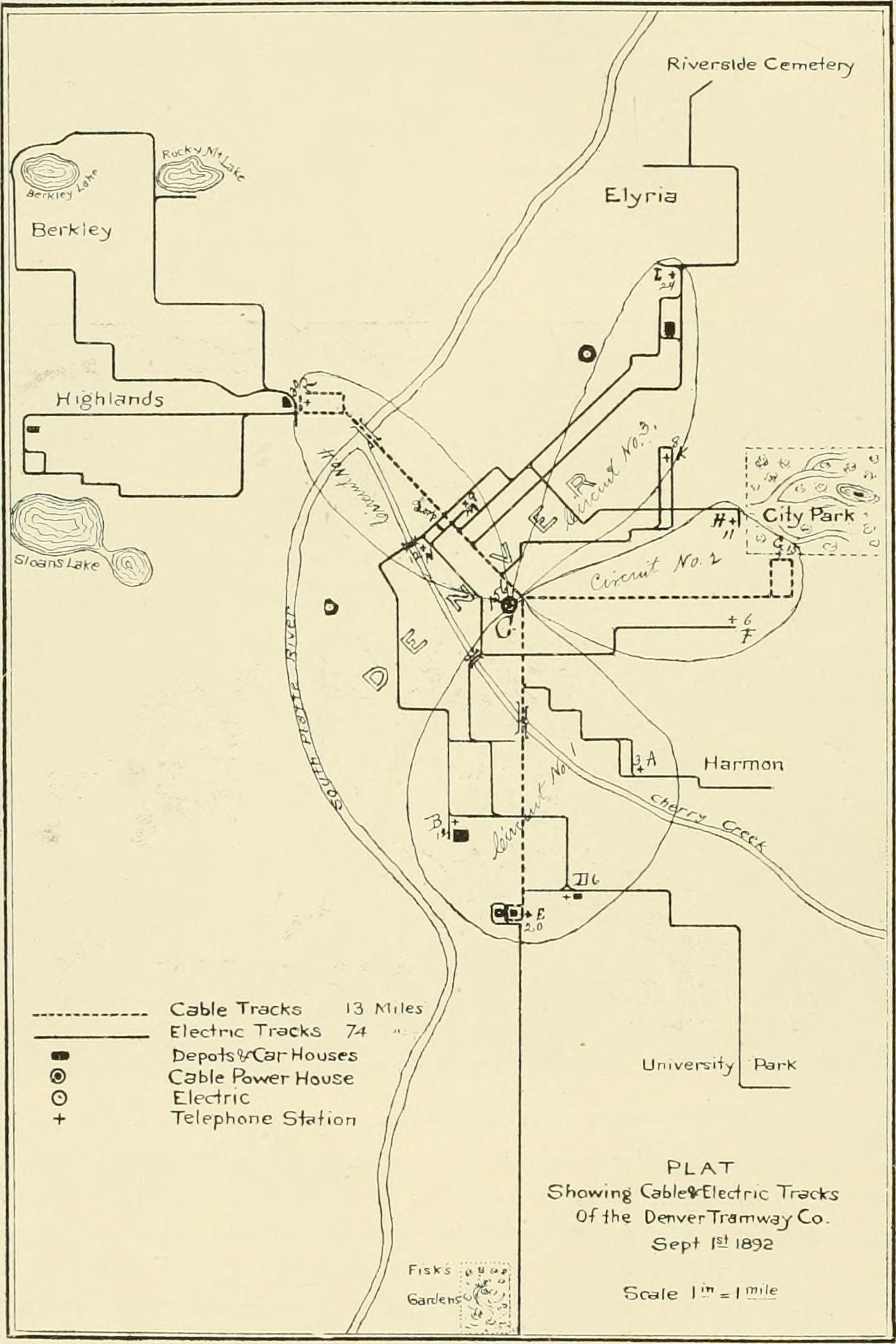
1891 map of Denver Transit Co.

The company was no stranger to controversy and had been taken to court a number of times. However, they cultivated a relationship with the local city counsels which often would amend the terms of their franchise to permit their activities. When the Colorado Supreme Court ruled in 1893 that Tramway's perpetual franchise was unconstitutional, the company used all of its political might to have the case retried. Upon re-examination the Supreme Court reversed it earlier ruling and found that the Denver Tramway Company's perpetual franchise was constitutional.

By 1893, Denver Tramway had electrified its entire system and was continuing to expand. The owners of the Denver Tramway Company consolidated their two nominally independent companies - the Denver Tramway Company, which served Denver proper, and the Metropolitan Railway Company, which served the suburbs - into The Denver Consolidated Tramway Company. Despite their power and influence, however, their main competitor was still the Denver City Cable Railway Company.

Then the panic of 1893 struck and industrial stagnation provided an opportunity to drive out competition. In November 1893, the Denver City Cable Railway Company went into receivership and reorganized under the slightly different title The Denver City Cable Railroad Company. The Tramway company used its connections with the city counsel to grant itself a franchise the Denver City Cable Railroad Company couldn't compete with and the two companies merged to become the Denver City Tramway Company. The company now held a monopoly on Denver's street railway service and claimed an exclusive perpetual franchise. Advertisements for the companies stock read, "The Denver City Tramway owns and controls the entire city railway system of the city of Denver comprising in all 156 miles of track serving a population of about 175,000 and has a franchise without limit to time and therefore perpetual."

=== A true monopoly, a faltering reputation ===
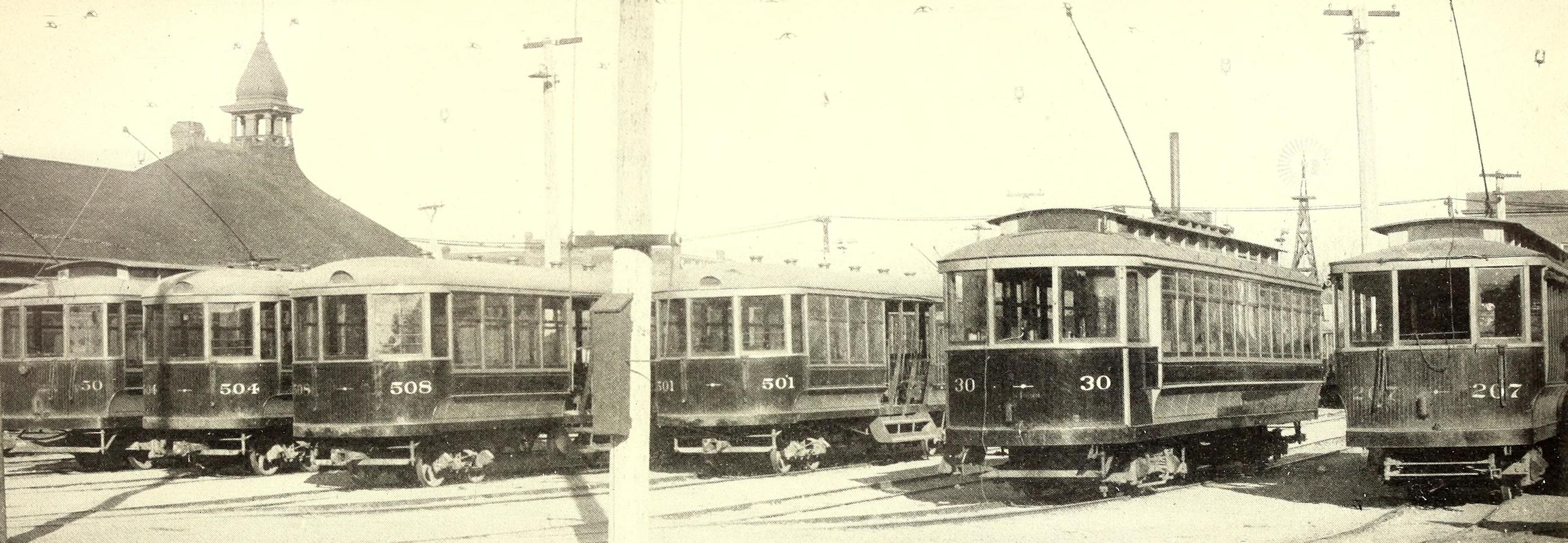
Trams at the Denver City storage yard, 1909

With its monopoly on the railways and its power in the local government secured the company began to maximize its profits and many locals felt that it wasn't compensating the city adequately. In 1895, Thomas S. McMurry was elected mayor after running on a platform stating that the city's government should be divorced from the city's public service corporations. McMurry vetoed a token peace offering from the Denver City Tramway, wanting instead a yearly return on the company's profits. The company then campaigned against McMurry and he lost the 1899 election. With a new mayor more friendly to the company in power, the Tramway company was not required to give the city any of its profits.

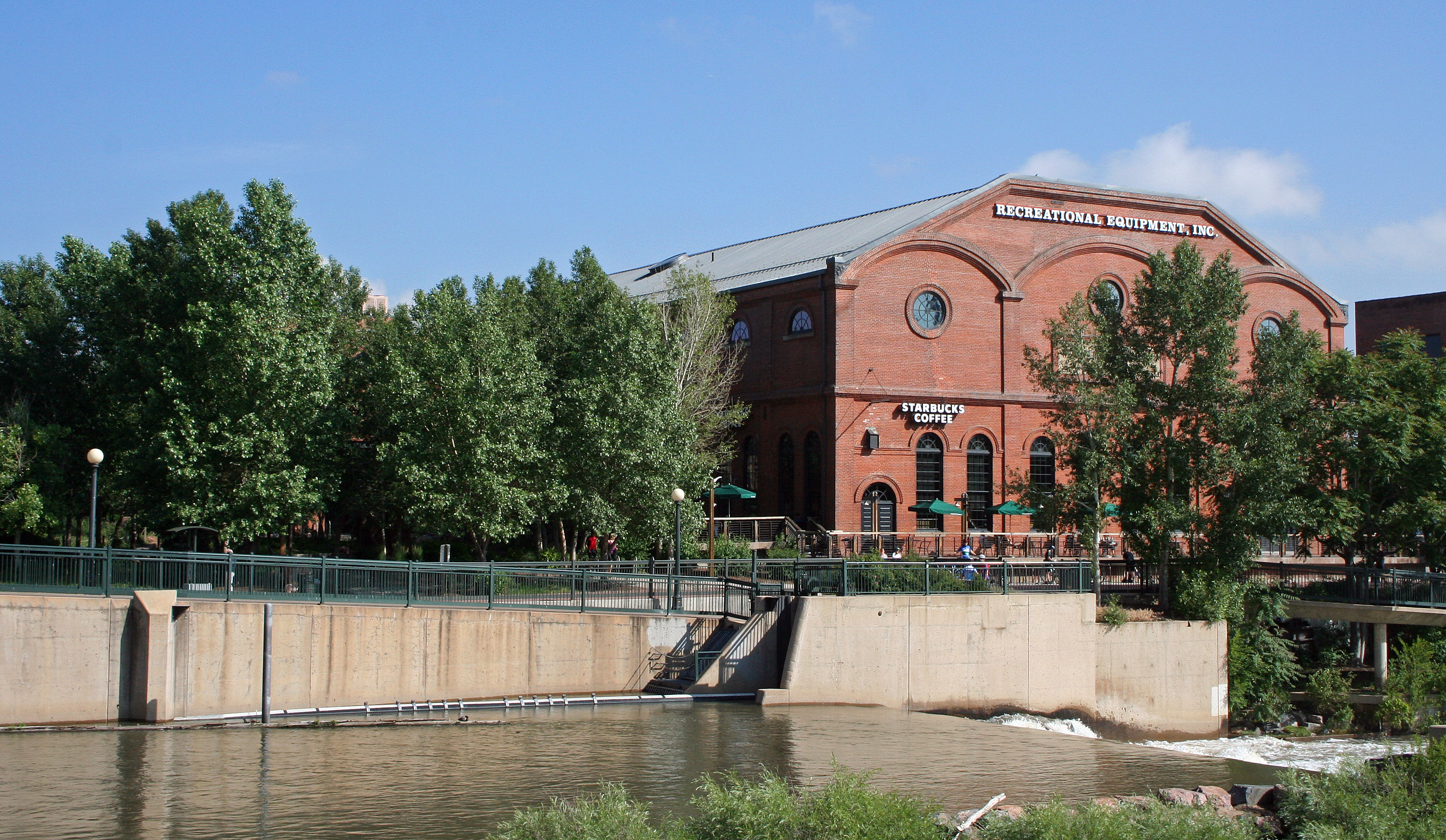
The former Denver Tramway Powerhouse in Highland, Denver.

But public opinion had begun to turn against the Denver City Tramway Company. Resentment peaked in 1905 when the company's franchise should have ended. The company continued to stand by its claim of a perpetual franchise but as a precaution drew up a new franchise in 1906 to appease the public. A reconstructed Colorado Supreme Court handed down a decision in 1910 which ruled against all perpetual franchises on the grounds that they were prohibited by the constitution. Thus the only Tramway franchise now valid was the one adopted in 1906.

The franchise charter the company had drawn up in 1906 was very generous for itself. Still it was based on the previous charter drawn up in 1885 and included terms such as a fixed rate fare, set at 5 cents, and an agreement that the company would contribute 50% of all maintenance costs for roads on which it had a two-way line. As automobile traffic began to increase, so did the wear and tear on the roads. Though the company was seeing record ridership levels - by 1917 it was making 62 million trips a year - it was not able to increase its fares to cover its increased expenses. The Tramway company petitioned the Colorado Public Utilities Commission, who authorized a 2-cent fare increase. The city of Denver sued and in 1919 Dewey C. Bailey was elected mayor on a promise to reinstate the 5-cent fare. The Denver Tramway Company responded with layoffs and pay cuts.

=== The 1920 strike ===
In 1920, the Tramway company again threatened to cut wages for its employees unless the city allowed it to increase the fares on its routes. Workers themselves wanted a raise after the wage cuts they had taken in the preceding 18 months. The public opposed a fare increase and the city would not allow it. Tramway company workers voted to strike, the company brought in strike-breakers, and violence quickly broke out with seven dead and 52 seriously wounded before federal troops intervened. In the end the Denver Tramway Company filed for bankruptcy.

The bankruptcy court allowed a fare increase and the Denver Tramway Company was able to get back on its feet. But years of neglect due to insufficient funds and an increase in automobile ownership meant that many Denverites stopped using the streetcar system.

=== Decline and end of operations ===
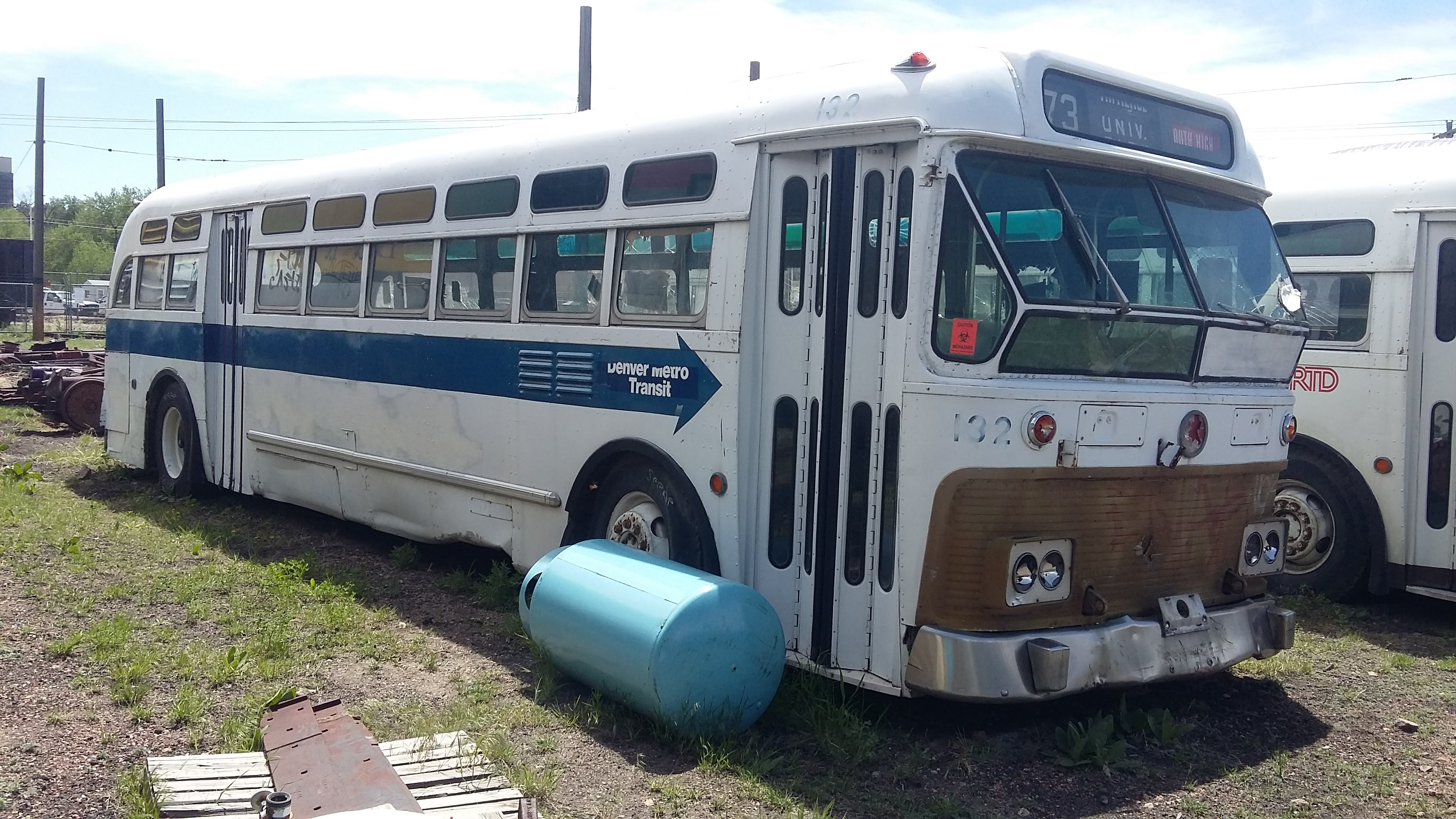
A Denver Metro Transit bus preserved in Colorado Springs

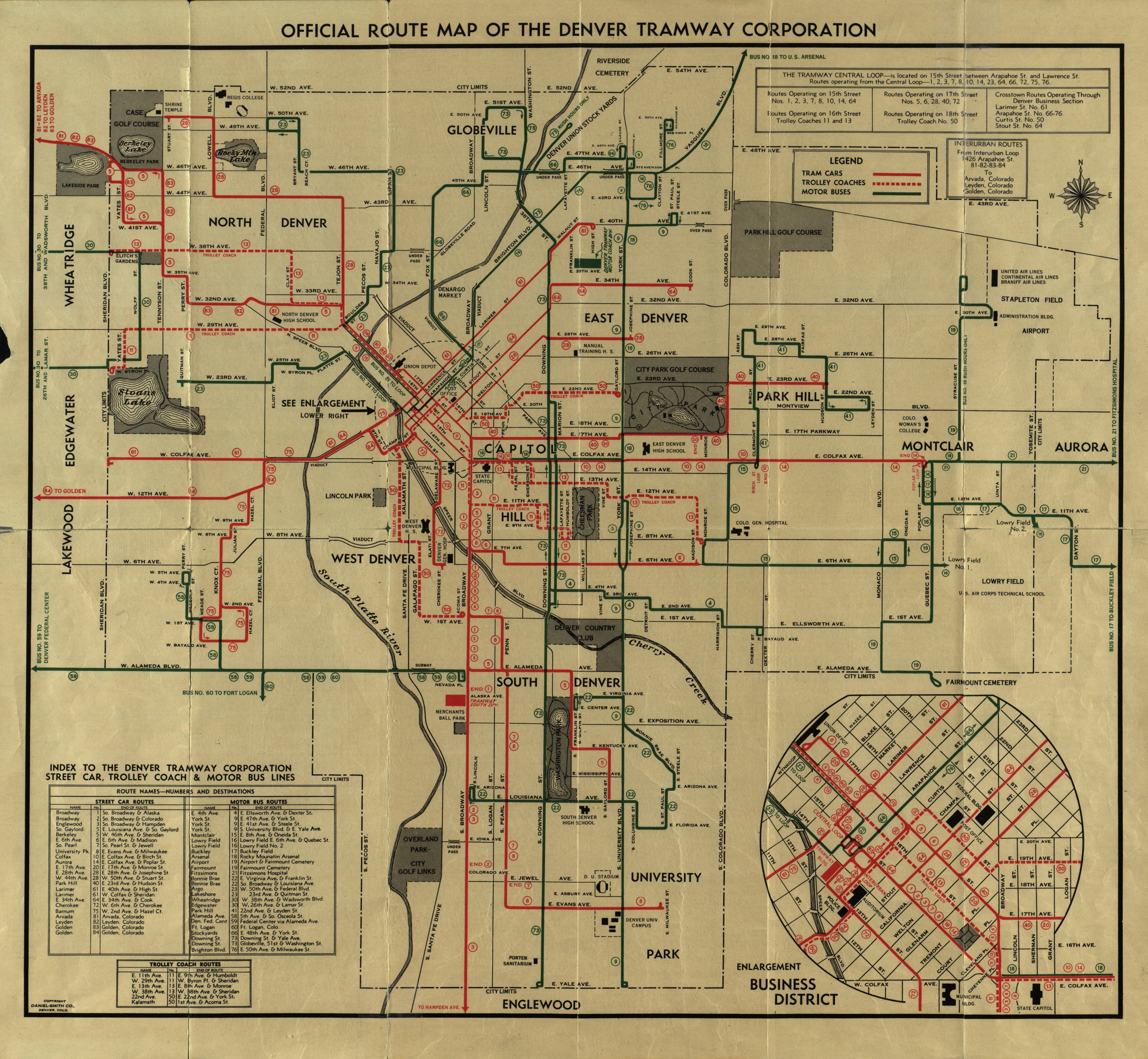
Map of route of Denver Tramway Corp. including schedule, 1947

In 1924 the first Denver Tramway bus service began operating between Englewood and Fort Logan. The company began to phase out streetcars in favor of trolley coaches (buses that used the overhead electric lines) and motor buses (internal combustion buses). Buses were less expensive to operate and were more flexible, as they were not confined to tracks. In addition, moving away from trolleys meant that the Denver Tramway no longer had an obligation to maintain the streets that it served. At the start of 1949, Denver Tramway had 131 streetcars in service, 138 trolley coaches, and 116 gasoline-powered buses. By the end of 1950 the streetcars were no longer in use and within 5 years most of the infrastructure for them had been removed. Trolley bus service ended in 1955.

Cars were becoming a larger part of life for Denverites. The Denver Tramway Company, with its monopoly on public transportation in the Denver area, was not expanding quickly and more commuters were using cars to get to and from Denver. Author Sherah Collins writes, "... in 1970, Denver had more cars per capita than any other place in the country, which is not surprising due to the lack of public transit options."

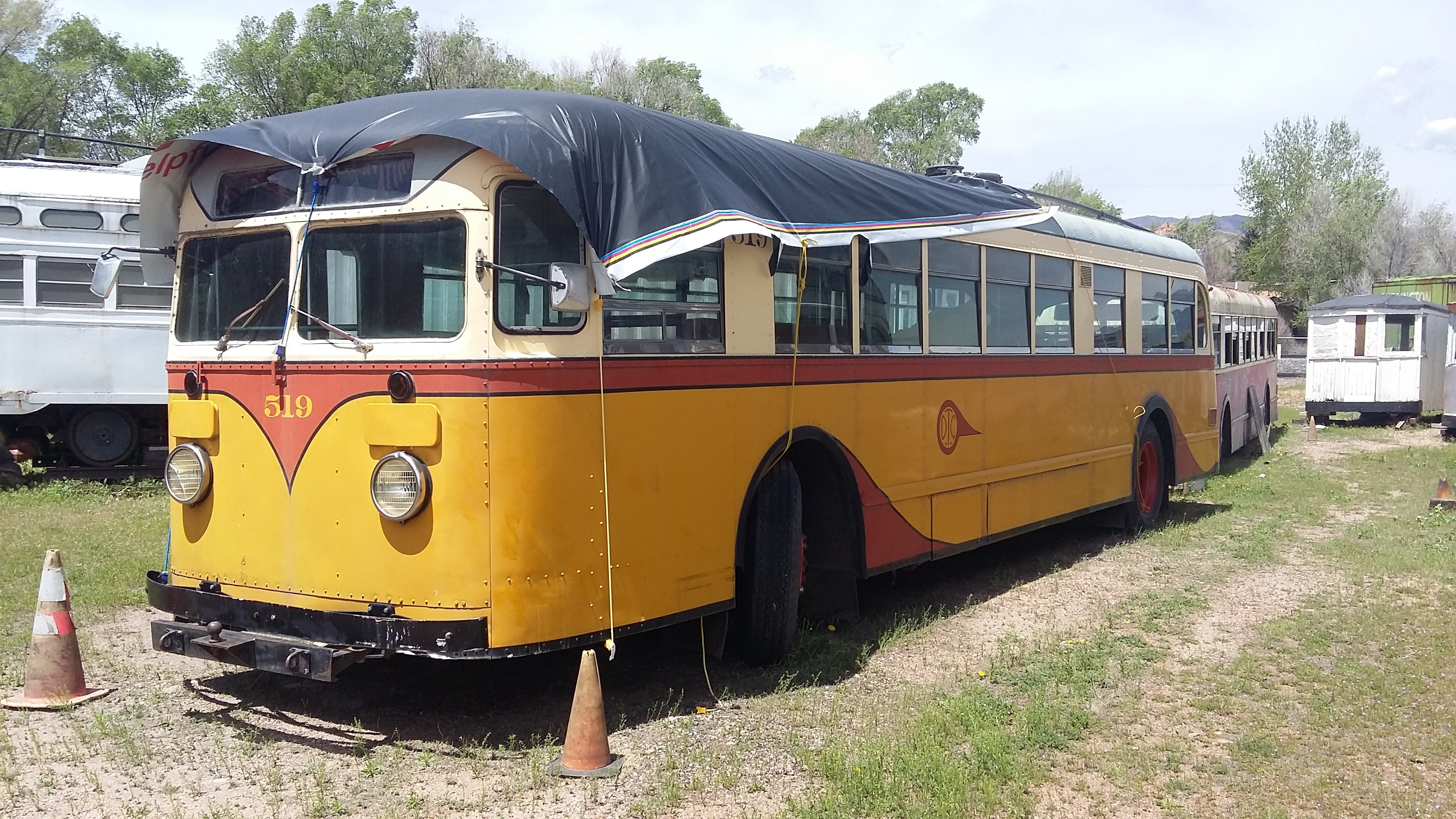
Denver Tramway Corporation electric trolley bus No. 519

From 1969 to 1971, the Denver Tramway Company continued service under the sponsorship of the City and County of Denver. On April 18,1971, with aging equipment, low revenues, and lackluster ridership, the Denver Tramway Company transferred all of its assets to city-owned Denver Metro Transit. As the Denver Metro Transit was an entity created by Denver, suburban service continued only for those suburbs willing to contribute a subsidy. Within two years, Denver Metro Transit was nearly bankrupt, which helped lead to the July 1974 takeover of DMT by the Regional Transportation District (RTD), an entity created in 1969 to operate public transit services in eight of the twelve counties in the Denver-Boulder area.

44 years after the closure of the tram system, rail-based mass transit returned to Denver with the opening of the new D Line light rail in 1994.

== Rolling stock and facilities ==
Electrical power initially came from a series of small power plants, but as the system grew so did the need for electricity. In 1901 a subsidiary company, The Denver Tramway Power Company, was incorporated to build and operate power plants to electrify the overhead street car lines. The Denver Tramway Company Powerhouse was built between 1901 and 1904 and following its 1911 addition became the primary source of electricity for Denver's streetcars. It operated until the end of the Tramway's streetcar service in the 1950s. The powerhouse later served as an International Harvester Company warehouse, was purchased by the Forney Transportation Museum in 1969, and was bought in 1998 by current owner REI to serve as its Denver flagship store.

The Denver Tramway Company used 39-foot trolley cars. Some were built by the company itself though most came from the Woeber Auto Body and Manufacturing Company. Type 1 cars were built for operation in a single direction, the entrance was on the center of the right side, and the rear of the cars were not completely enclosed. Type 2 cars were built to be reversible so they had controls at both ends and center entrances on both sides. The trolley cars had a distinct appearance, being painted "Coach Painter’s Red" on the main panel, and "Dark Straw", (yellow) on the lower panels. Unpowered trailers could be pulled behind the trolleys in rush hour in order to carry an increased number of riders.

Few trolley cars from the system have been preserved. After the switch from streetcars to buses after World War II, the Denver Tramway Co. sold the old trolleys for $100 each. One passenger car from the Tramway fleet, No. 54, rests within the former Denver City Cable Railway’s powerhouse at 18th and Lawrence Street, formerly an Old Spaghetti Factory restaurant.

== See also ==
- List of streetcar systems in the United States
- Denver and Intermountain Railroad – acquired by the Denver Tramway in 1910
