= Evans Memorial Chapel =

Oldest continuously-used religious building in Denver

- U.S. National Register of Historic Places
- U.S. National Historic Landmark
- Colorado State Register of Historic Properties
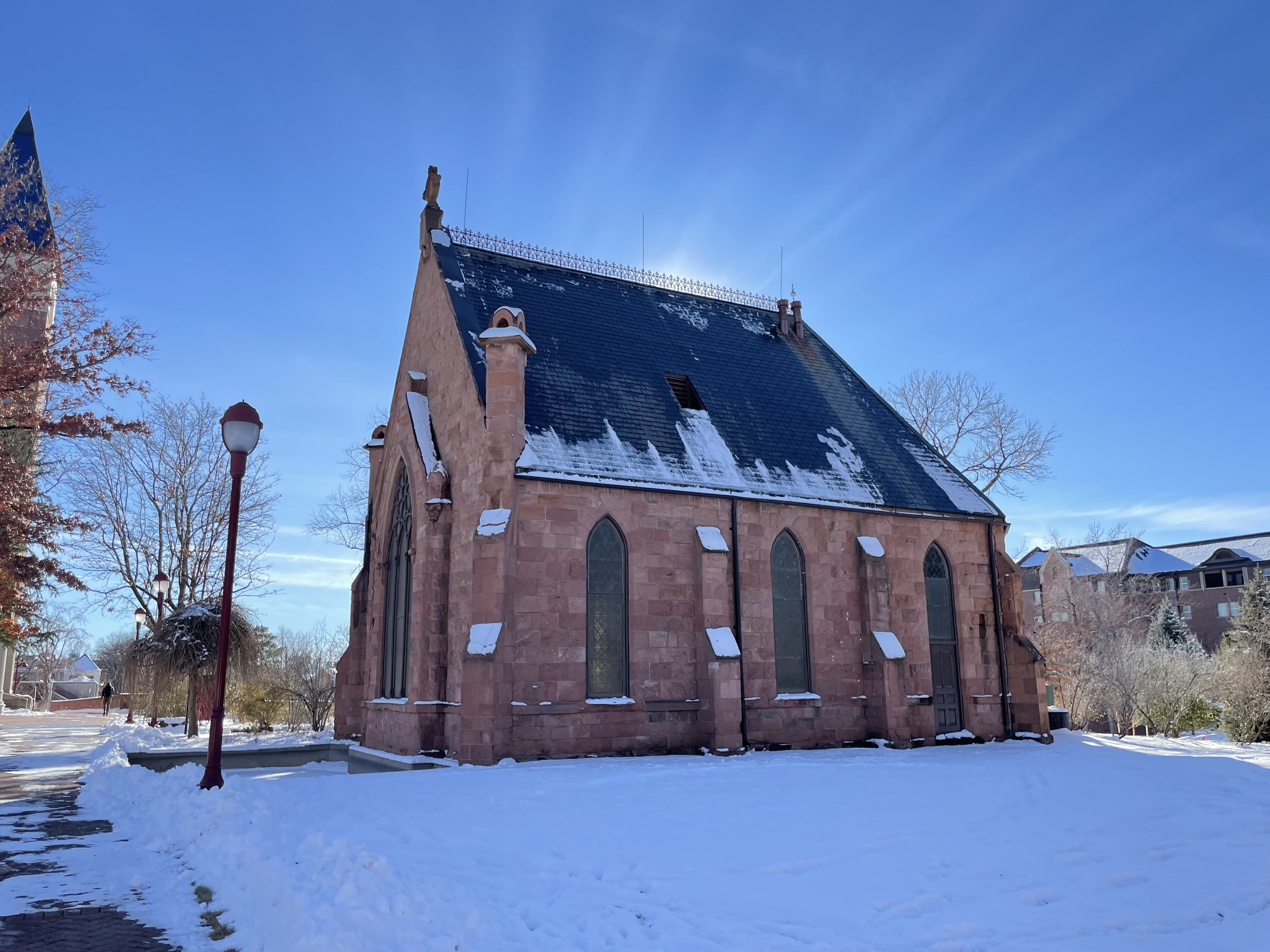
- The chapel in 2022

- Location within Colorado Location within the United States
- Location: University of Denver campus, Denver, Colorado
- Coordinates: 39°40′36″N 104°57′47″W
- Area: 0.2 acres (0.081 ha)
- Built: 1878 (moved 1959–1960)
- Architectural style: Early Gothic Revival
- NRHP reference No.: 74000567
- CSRHP No.: 5DV.174

Significant dates
- Added to NRHP: December 27, 1974
- Designated NHL: 1988

The Evans Memorial Chapel (often simply Evans Chapel) is an historic chapel on the campus of the University of Denver in Colorado. It is the oldest continuously-used building for religious purposes in Denver. (Note: The oldest surviving religious building in Denver is Emmanuel Chapel. Formerly an Episcopalian chapel and Jewish synagogue, it is now an art gallery.) Completed in 1878, the Evans Memorial Chapel was built with patronage by John Evans in honor of his daughter Josephine. Evans was governor of the Colorado Territory and a founder of the Colorado Seminary (now the University of Denver). Once part of Grace Church, a prominent Methodist Episcopal congregation on 13th Avenue and Bannock in downtown Denver, the small Gothic Revival chapel was moved to the University of Denver's campus in 1959. It reopened there in April 1960, and is now the campus's oldest building. It currently serves as an interdenominational chapel and wedding venue.

== History ==
John Evans, the then-former governor of the Territory of Colorado, had founded both Northwestern University and Colorado Seminary as Methodist Episcopal colleges, the latter eventually becoming the University of Denver. In 1873, Evans contributed funding after being asked to support the construction of a new chapel that had grown out of "Evans Mission Sunday-school" of Lawerence Street Methodist Church (later renamed Trinity Church) in what was then southern Denver. The same year, Evans also initiated subscription fundraising for this chapel's construction to honor his late daughter Josephine, who had died of consumption in 1868 at age 24. Josephine had been married to former territorial governor and Colorado Supreme Court justice Samuel Hitt Elbert.

After several years of slow subscription collection, the chapel–which cost $13,000 (equivalent to $433,707 in 2025)–was completed in 1878. Evans's friend Matthew Simpson, a Pennsylvanian bishop, dedicated the Evans Memorial Chapel on 10 October that year. The chapel, on West 13th and Bannock (Note: A map of Denver in 1889 shows that what is now Bannock was then known as 14th Street.) in Denver near the original location of Trinity Church, was one of five Methodist churches in downtown Denver, all of which experienced significant growth before 1890. Many Denver leaders attended the chapel for their worship during this period.

Elizabeth Iliff, widow of John Wesley Iliff, would use her husband's estate to fund the establishment of the Iliff School of Theology as part of University of Denver following his death in 1878. She later met Henry White Warren, an influential Methodist Episcopal bishop and the first resident Methodist bishop of Colorado. Elizabeth, who proved successful in business like her first husband, married Warren in the Evans Chapel on 27 December 1883.

Horato S. Hilton was assigned as the chapel's first pastor while also serving as pastor of St. James. After two years, J. F. McClelland was assigned as pastor, serving in 1880 and 1881 until his poor health forced him out and left University of Denver chancellor David Hastings Moore to fill the vacancy. McClelland's pastorate saw only five people listed as members of the chapel's congregation, including one who was not able to be found and another who reported that he did not know he was a member. During this period, Evans's pew at the chapel cost him $1,400 (equivalent to $46,707 in 2025). B. W. Baker was appointed as a minister of the Evans Chapel in 1881 by the local conference's meeting in Leadville; Moore was formally assigned to the chapel in 1883.

It was common in the 19th-century Methodist Episcopal Church to reserve the best church appointments for influential non-local ministers who often only remained in the Methodist Episcopal Church's Colorado Conference territory briefly. Among these appointments was that of the Central Pennsylvania Conference's C. W. Buoy to the Evans Memorial Chapel in 1882. Buoy, the son-in-law of Bishop Simpson, remained only two years, drawing a salary of $6,300 (equivalent to $225,750 in 2025). During Buoy's appointment, Simpson visited Denver, where he was received as a popular orator and developed a positive opinion of the city; Simpson would hold a stake in Denver real estate development at his death in 1884. Henry A. Buchtel, who would later become chancellor of the University of Denver and state governor of Colorado, was a pastor in the Methodist Episcopal Church and was made the pastor of Evans Chapel in 1886. Buchtel's talents there soon earned him the more prestigious pastoral position at Lawerence Street Church.

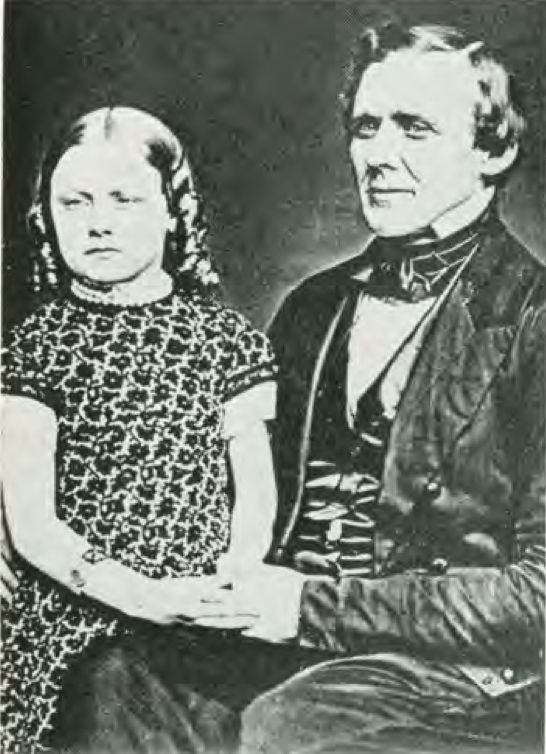
John Evans with daughter Josephine, c. 1859

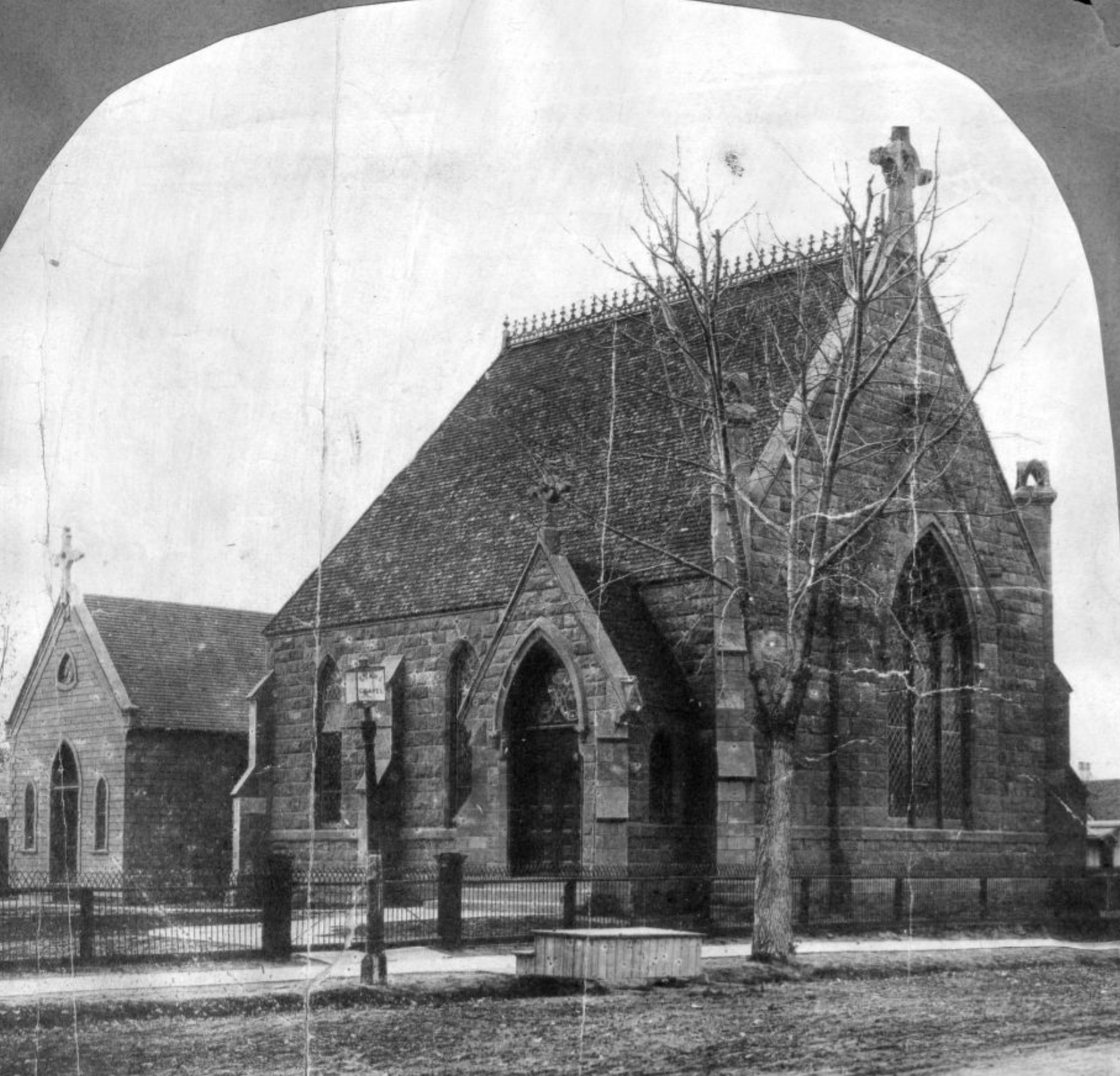
Evans Chapel at original location, c. 1880–1888

Another minister, former Indiana congressman Gilbert De La Matyr, became the chapel congregation's leader in 1886 when it numbered 183 members. At his departure in 1889, the congregation had 234 members. De La Matyr had preached a sermon in January 1888 which recognized the need to build more space for the new members. After the sermon was reprinted in the Rocky Mountain News, a new sanctuary was constructed, funded by donations, for $85,000 (equivalent to $3,045,833 in 2025). It was dedicated in January 1889 with no debt. This larger structure, adjoining the original chapel, was named Grace Church. The 1889 expansion was a red sandstone structure like the chapel, but much larger, with a tall spire. An organ for Grace Church was acquired for $10,000 (equivalent to $358,333 in 2025).

Christian Fichthorne Reisner would become the pastor of the congregation by 1905, serving until 1911. Reisner then moved to Manhattan where he gained attention as the most oft-published Methodist pastor and as a staunch prohibitionist of "gangster sociability". Elmer Ellsworth Higley became a pastor in June 1910.

Grace Church's congregation at one point reached 900 members, but had shrunk to 385 by 1912. Bishop White Warren's death that year initiated a period of change for the church and area. Charles O. Thibodeau made efforts to integrate Grace Church into the changing surrounding community after becoming pastor in 1915. Succeeded by George A. Lackland in 1918, further community efforts saw the congregation grow to 1,003 members in 1922. Among the initiatives the church organized was the Colorado Labor College, with labor organizer John R. Lawson as its dean. Later pastors failed to maintain the growth: the church claimed 280 members in 1930 and the Grace Community Center was spun off from the church in 1935.

The Grace Church Methodist congregation would move to the Denver neighborhood of University Hills after a final worship service in December 1953. The Evans Chapel and Grace Church were initially sold off to another denomination that worshipped at their original location from 1953 to 1958.

=== Modern location ===
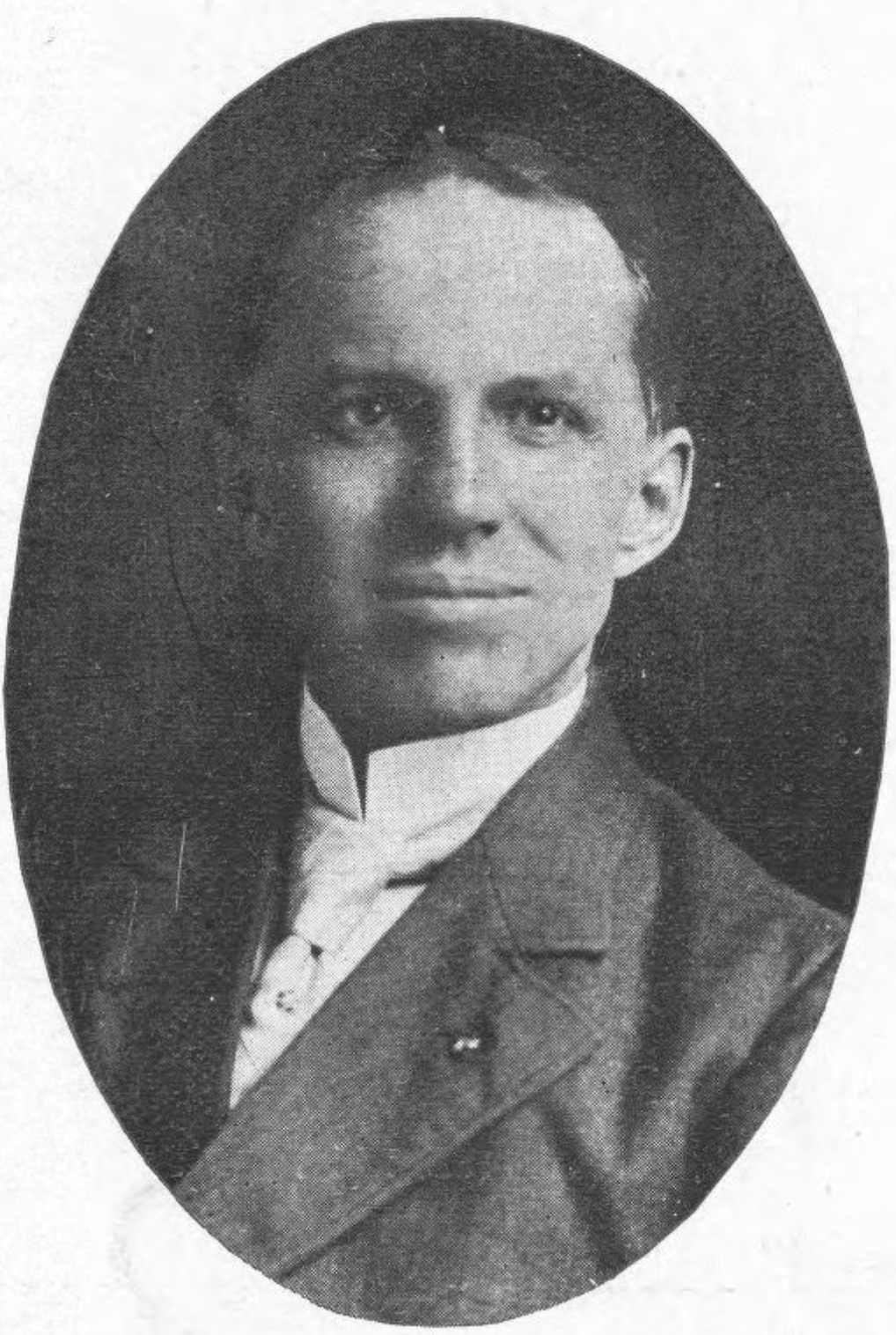
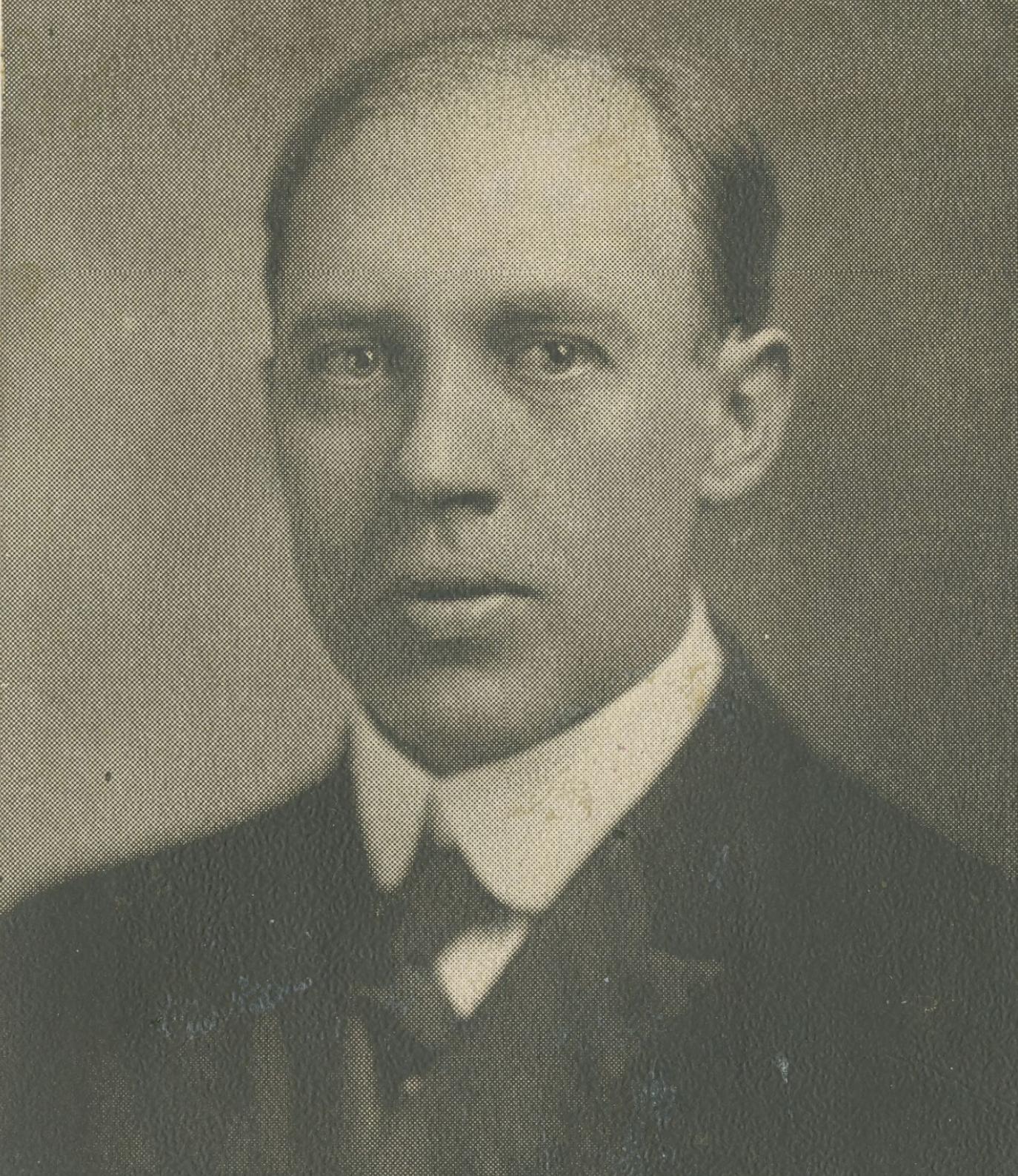
Grace Methodist Episcopal Church branded itself as "The Homelike Church" under Pastors Higley (top) and Thibodeau.

The former Grace Church property with the chapel was resold to the University of Denver, which had been looking to purchase the property since 1947, in 1958. The university intended to demolish both church buildings to construct parking for the university's law school, which had recently merged with another local law school. Martin Rist, then President of the Rocky Mountain Methodist Historical Society, was informed of the plans and asked the university's chancellor Chester M. Alter to save the chapel. Alter embraced the idea and penned an opinion piece in the Rocky Mountain News entitled "Let's Save the Chapel!" The move was funded by a donation from John Evans, the former president of the university's board of trustees and grandson of the governor John Evans who had sponsored the chapel's original construction, as well as other members of the Evans family. (Note: The later John Evans's "perseverance and foresight" are also credited in the chapel's preservation.) The site selected for the relocation was west of Mary Reed Library on an axis with Mount Blue Sky (formerly known as Mount Evans).

The size of the 1889 expansion, Grace Church, made moving it impractical and it was demolished. The original chapel's size, though comparatively small, made it impossible to transport the chapel in one piece the six miles to its new location; even if electrical lines and traffic lights could be removed, the building's weight of 427 tons was too great for any bridges. A Denver traffic engineer, asserting that the chapel could not be moved, said "We have enough trouble with chicken coops." Instead, the chapel was disassembled, pieces marked, and transported once fully dismantled to the university's campus at a cost of $80,000 (equivalent to $870,641 in 2025). Four months of rebuilding culminated on 22 April 1960 with an "Act of Thanksgiving" and re-dedication ceremony. Fourteen graduating seniors were selected to perform the dedication, which was attended by 60 United Methodist Church bishops who were in Denver for the General Conference. The chapel was re-established as a "Protestant center on the campus".

The area around the relocated Evans Memorial Chapel was converted into a garden for $125,000. The funding, granted to the school in 1964, came from Heber Harper, who had been chancellor of the university from 1922 to 1927. Elements of the Harper Memorial Garden–also known as the Humanities Gardens–used surplus stone from the chapel's relocation and the demolished Grace Church. When the university's larger Buchtel Chapel was lost to a fire in 1983, the Evans Chapel took over many of the destroyed building's duties. The chapel was designated as a City and County of Denver landmark in 1969, added to the National Register of Historic Places in 1974, and designated a National Historic Landmark in 1988. It currently hosts Masses for Catholic university students and ecumenical events. In 2014, the chapel was reported to average 53 weddings a year, though weddings in the Evans Chapel were halted until 2023 during renovations.

== Design ==
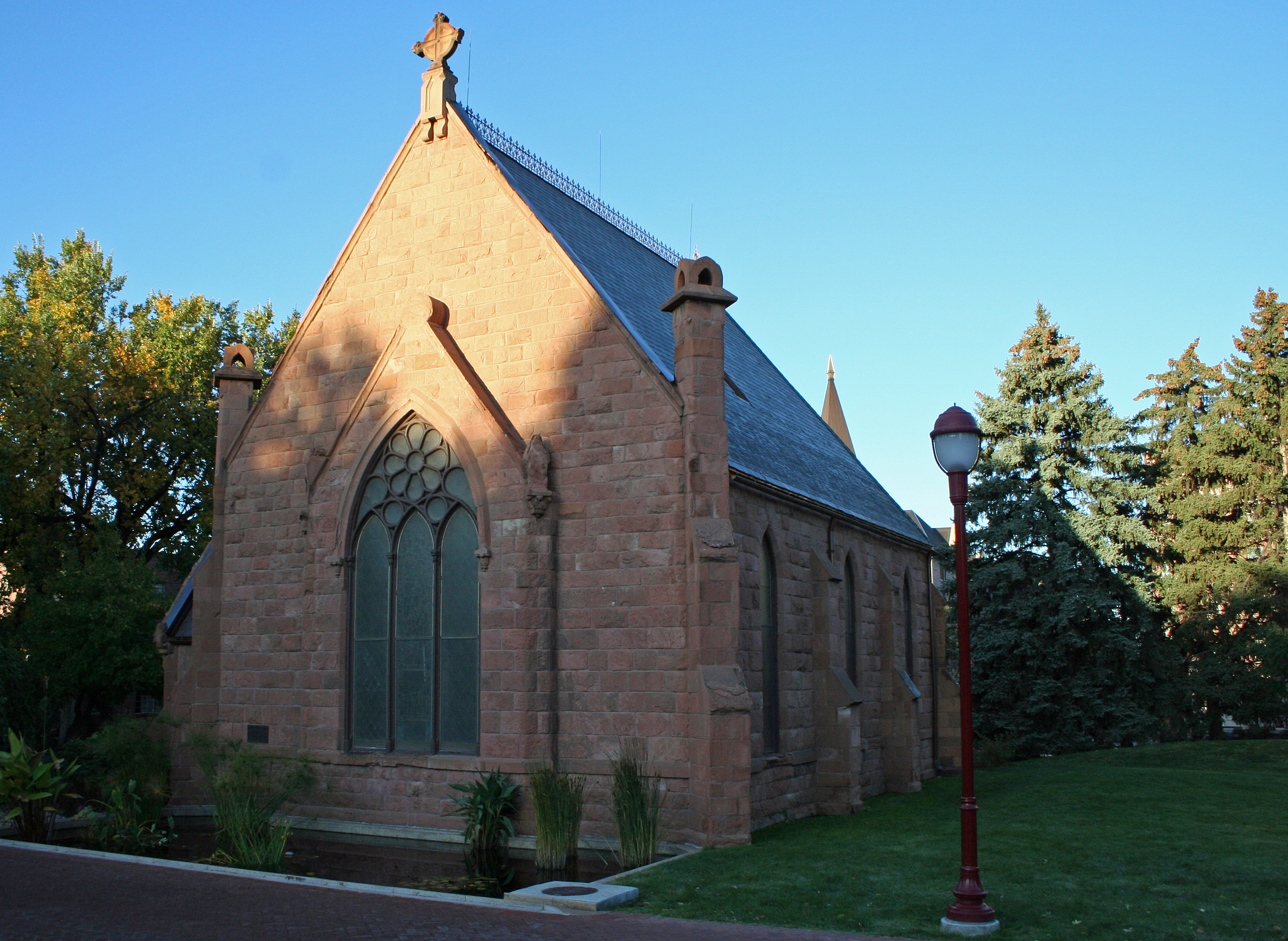
Eastern exterior of the chapel at university location, 2009

The Evans Memorial Chapel is a relatively small structure with an exterior of rusticated Colorado red sandstone. The chapel's congregation rapidly outgrew the size of the building–roughly 40 feet wide, 50 feet long, and 40 feet tall with seating for 64 congregants and a 12 person choir–so the larger, since-demolished Grace Church sanctuary was adjoined. An example of early Gothic Revival architecture, its appearance has been described as "reminiscent of chapels in the west of France." The chapel's single room sits on an east-west axis, terminating in an octagonal apse to the west. A choir is below the east window and the main entrance is found on the southern wall with a small vestibule. On the ceiling are ornate open tracery wood trusses.

A 1967 survey by the Colorado Historical Society assessed the building as being in "excellent" condition, though some damaged elements had been recently replaced. Among the replaced portions is a stone cross originally from the demolished larger sanctuary. An organ was added in 1965.

The chapel's stained glass windows were moved with the rest of the structure to the University of Denver's campus. Due to aging and poorly executed prior repairs, some stained glass was removed to be restored with repainting and stabilization in 2022. Broken or missing pieces were replaced using the inventory of the restoring firm—the same firm that had been employed to help move the stained glass in 1959. However, it was announced that mismatched pieces would be retained as historic "idiosyncrasies". Additionally, the lead being used in the repairs dates to the same 1880s period as the original windows. The restoration is projected to be completed in 2023.

While the move and reconstruction of the Evans Memorial Chapel on the University of Denver's campus included deliberate and constrained efforts to preserve the chapel's appearance and original elements, modifications were made then and over the course of the chapel's lifetime. Among these was the addition and removal of a stage before 1945 and replacement of damaged portions of the stonework.

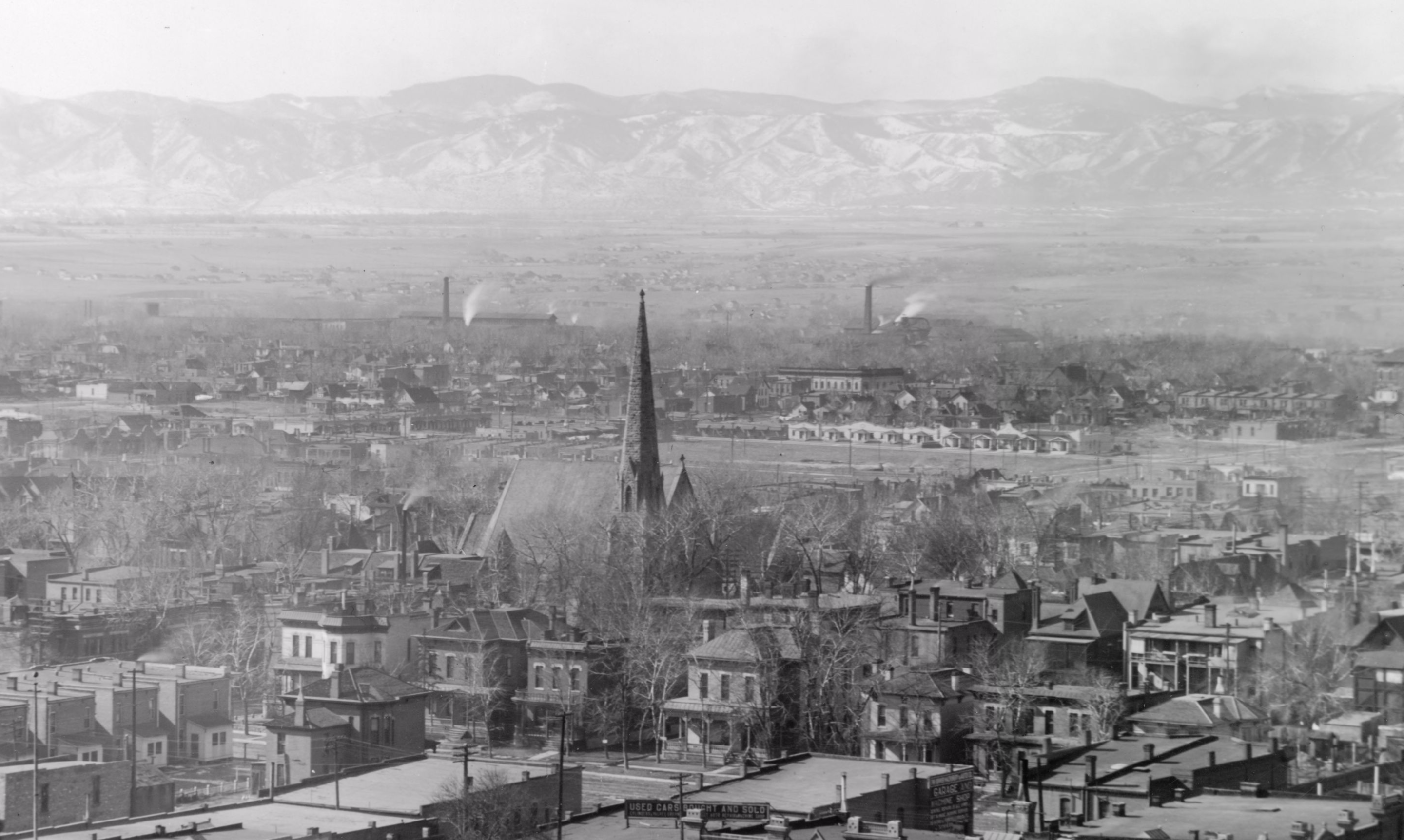
Skyline view of Grace Church (center) with Evans Chapel partially obscured, c. 1910

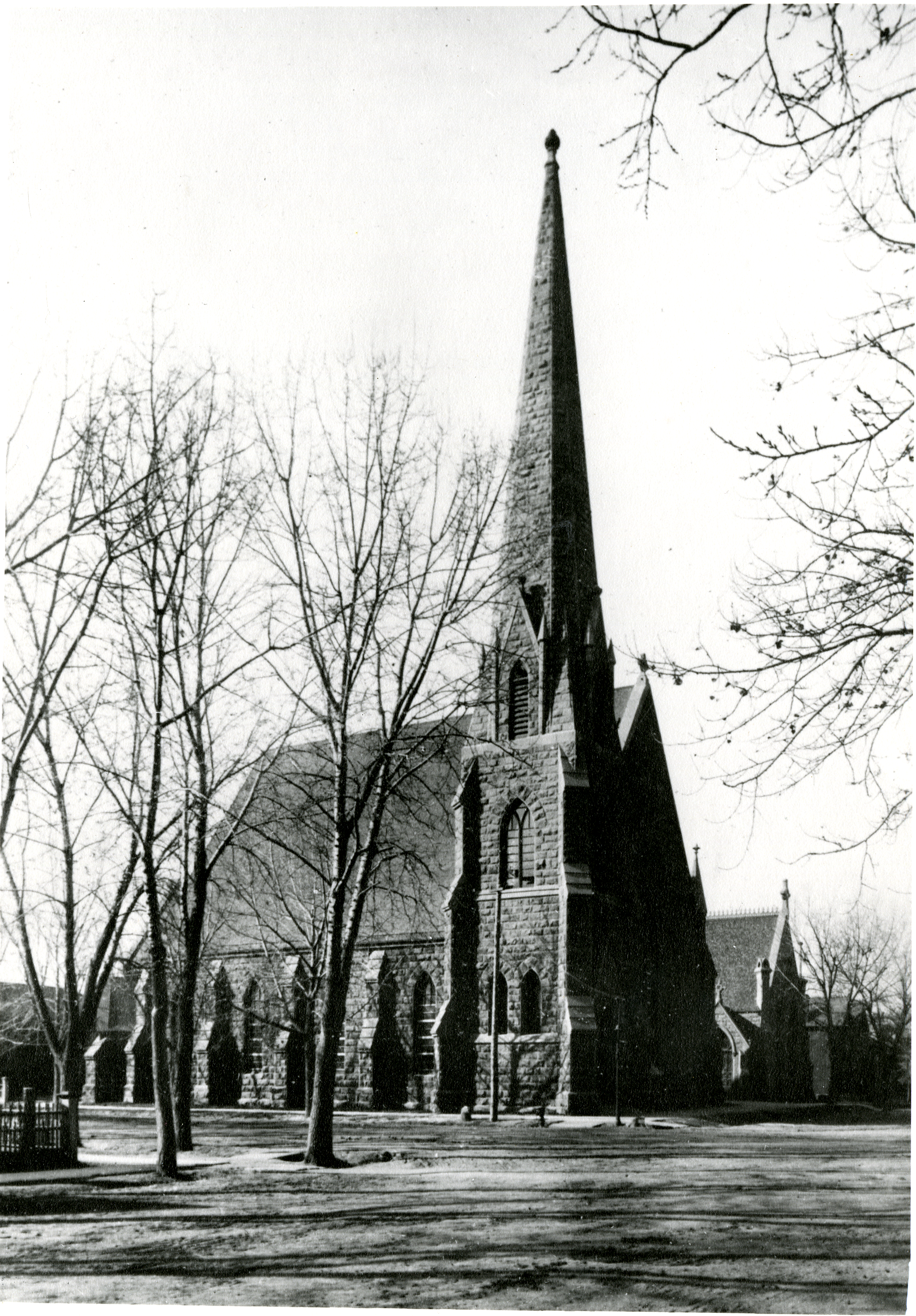
Grace Church and Evans Chapel

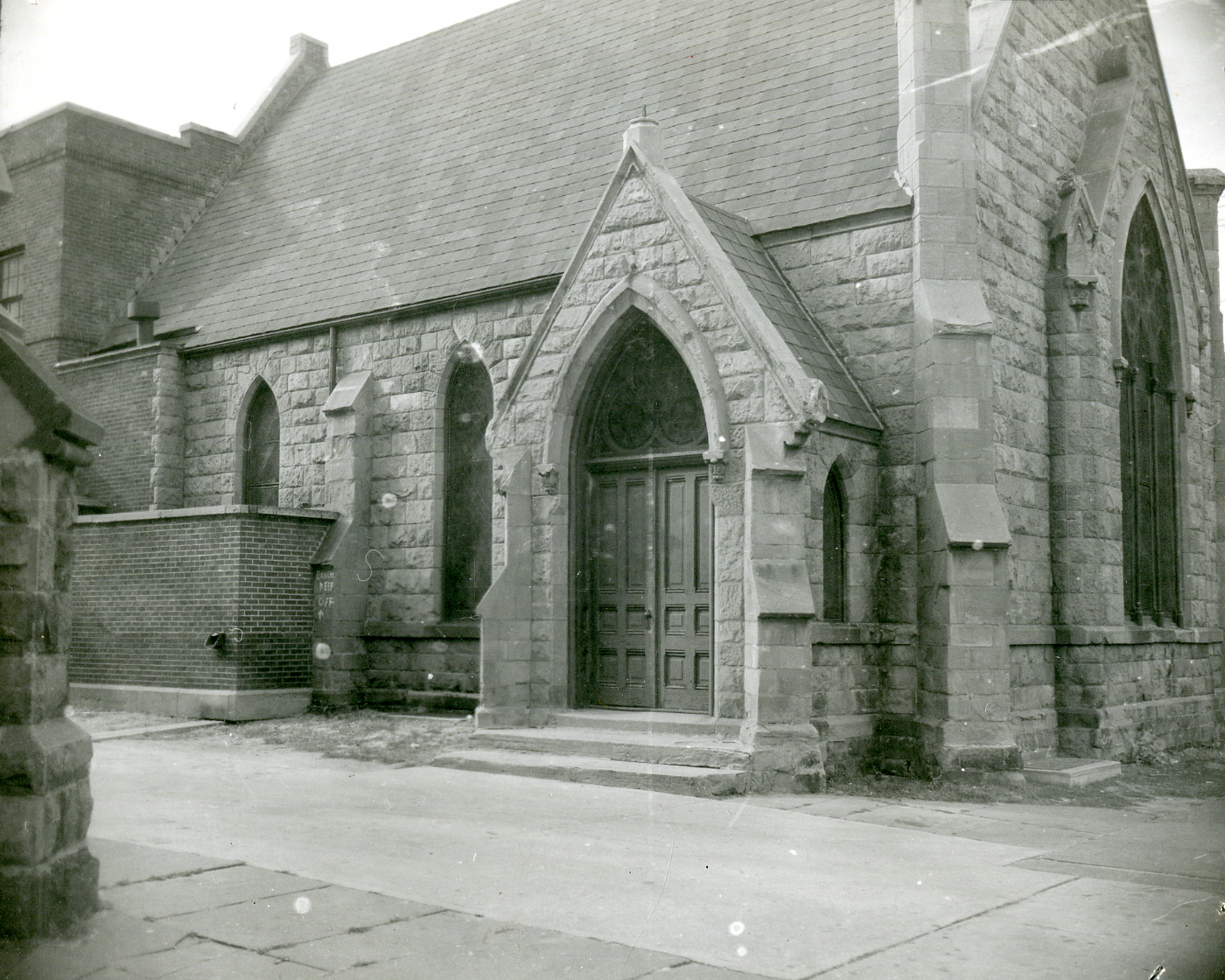
Chapel shortly before move

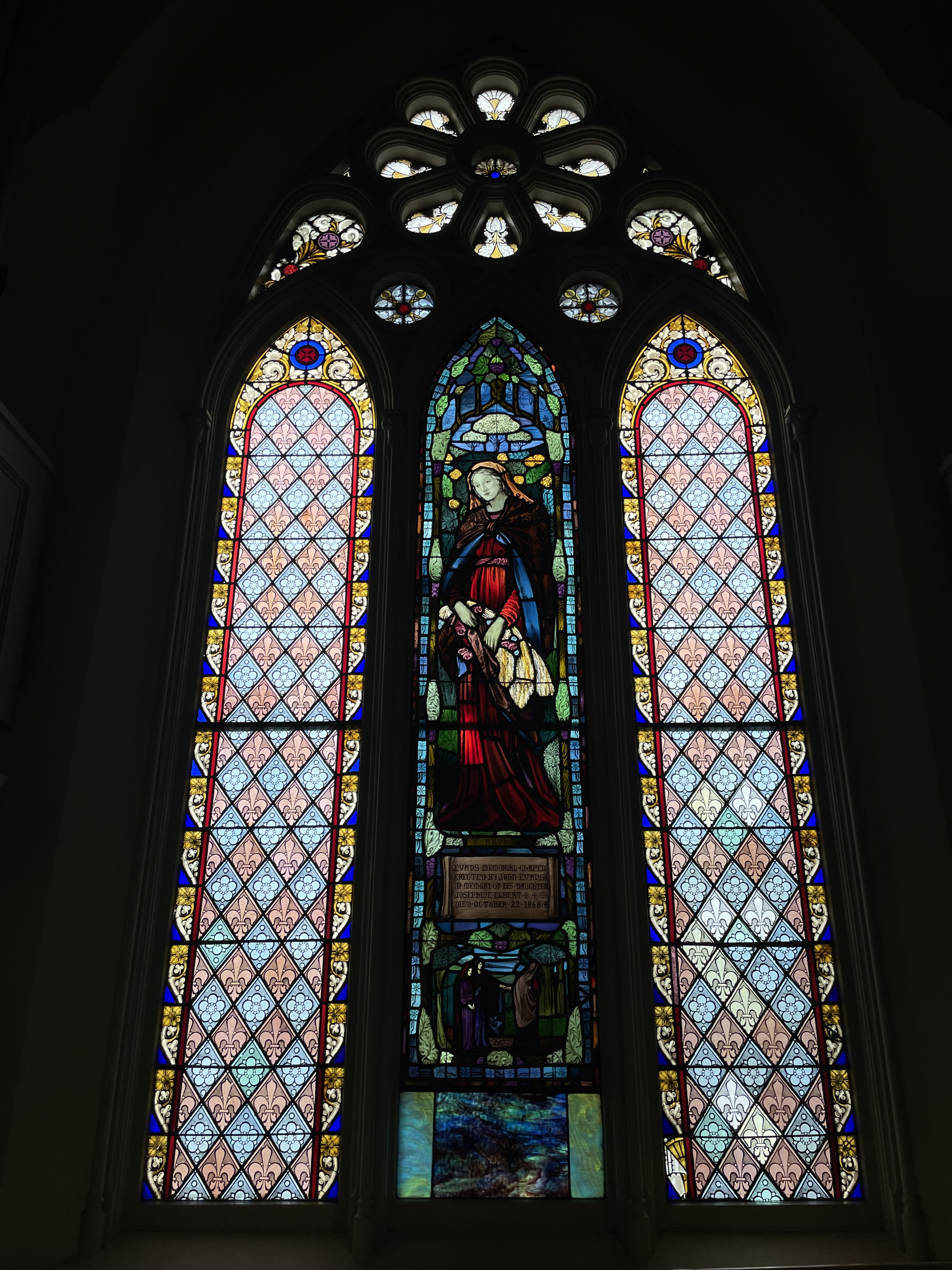
Stained glass of Ruth in Evans Memorial Chapel

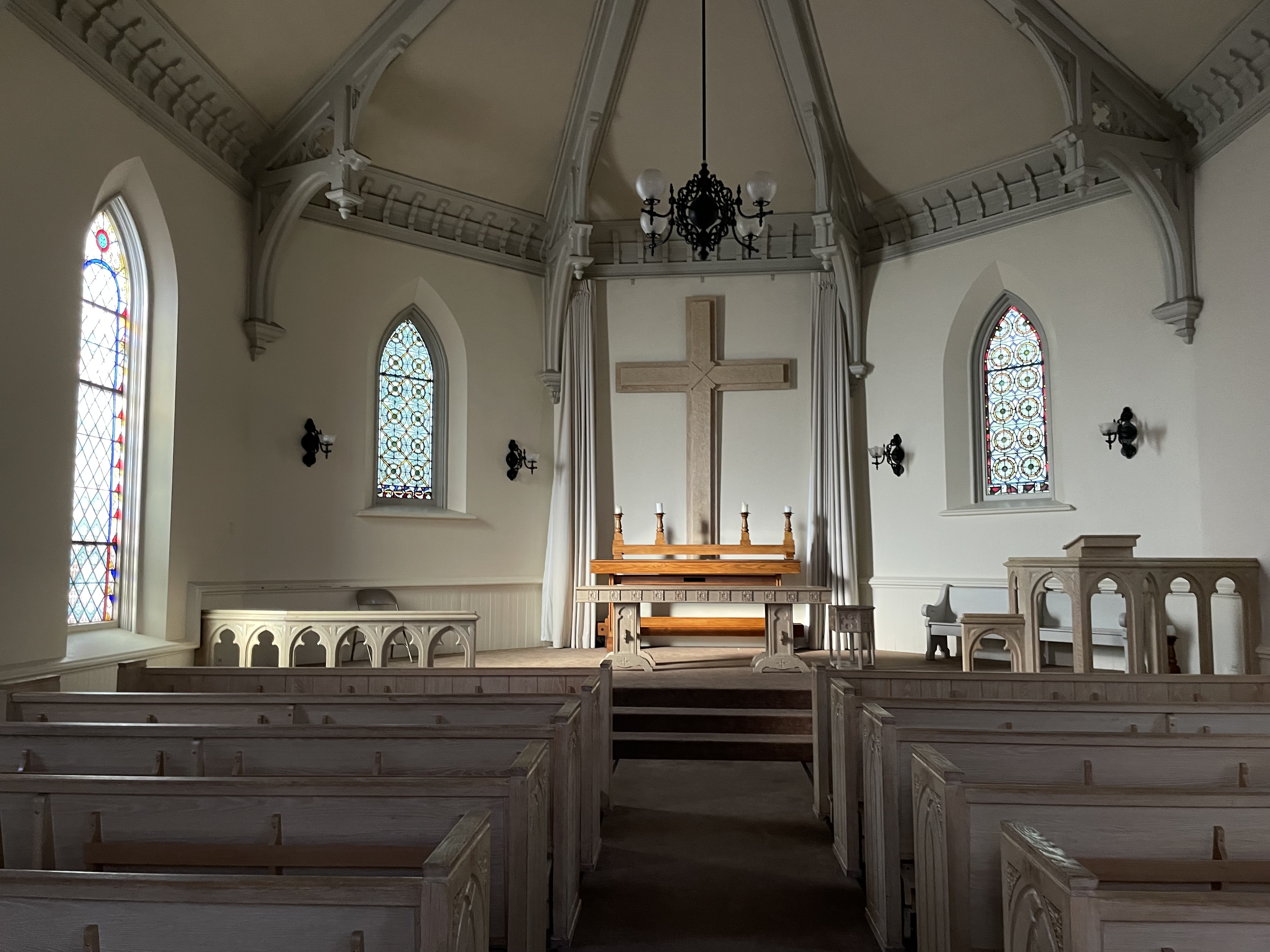
Interior and altar of chapel, 2021

== See also ==
- National Register of Historic Places listings in southeast Denver
- Chamberlin Observatory
- St. Vrain Church of the Brethren
- South Denver, Colorado, a Methodist community co-established by John Evans at the current site of chapel
- University, Denver
