= 1908 Colorado gubernatorial election =

- November 3, 1908
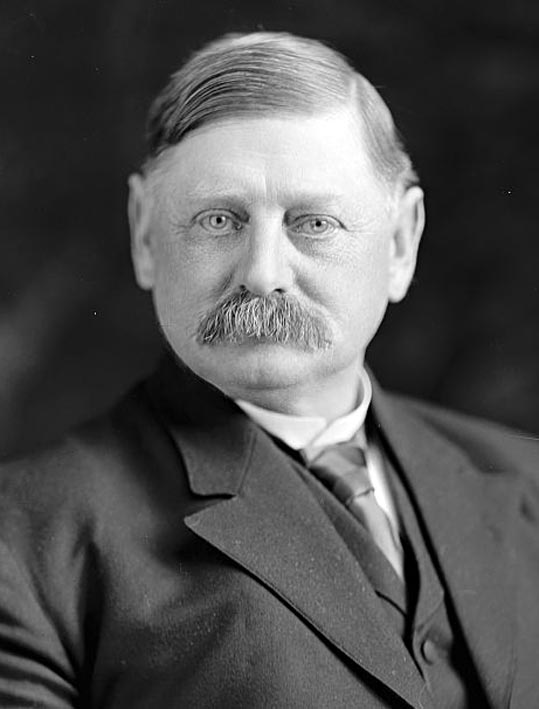

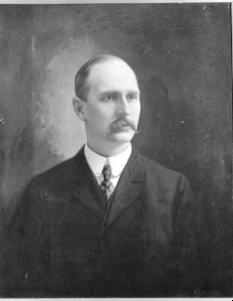
Nominee	John F. Shafroth	Jesse Fuller McDonald
Party	Democratic	Republican
Popular vote	130,141	118,953
Percentage	49.41%	45.16%
- County results Shafroth: 40–50% 50–60% 60–70% McDonald: 40–50% 50–60% 60–70% 70–80%
Governor before election
Henry Augustus Buchtel
Republican
Elected Governor
John F. Shafroth
Democratic

The 1908 Colorado gubernatorial election was held on November 3, 1908. Democratic nominee John F. Shafroth defeated Republican nominee Jesse Fuller McDonald with 49.41% of the vote.

== General election ==
=== Candidates ===
Major party candidates

- John F. Shafroth, Democratic
- Jesse Fuller McDonald, Republican

Other candidates

- Henry Clay Darrah, Socialist
- H. L. Murray, Prohibition

=== Results ===
1908 Colorado gubernatorial election
Party	Candidate	Votes	%	±%
Democratic	John F. Shafroth	130,141	49.41%	+12.78%
Republican	Jesse Fuller McDonald	118,953	45.16%	−0.43%
Socialist	Henry Clay Darrah	7,972	3.03%	−4.85%
Prohibition	H. L. Murray	6,314	2.40%	+1.37%
Majority		11,188	4.25%	
Turnout		263,380%		
Democratic gain from Republican		Swing		
