= Fred Parks =

Fred Parks may refer to:

- Fred W. Parks (1871–1941), Lieutenant Governor of Colorado, 1905–1907
- Frederick Parks (1885–1945), heavyweight boxing champion

== See also ==
- Fred Taylor Park, home stadium to Waitakere United
