= List of labor slogans =

This is a list of slogans used by organized labor, or by workers who are attempting to organize.

== Glossary of labor slogans ==
- The slogan "An injury to one..." has a long history in the union movement. Initially attributed to the Knights of Labor, the expression took the form "an injury to one is the concern of all." At the suggestion of David C. Coates, the Industrial Workers of the World at their founding convention in 1905 adopted a variation of the expression, rendered as "an injury to one is an injury to all."
- Boring from within is a crude translation of a French syndicalist expression, la pénétration, (literally, penetration) which, according to Paul Brissenden, was initially recommended to the Industrial Workers of the World (IWW) by William Z. Foster, as a preferred alternative to dual unionism with regard to the AFL. The IWW ignored the recommendation in 1911, and rejected the tactic as impossible in 1914. Foster, who had become a member of the IWW in 1909, left that organization and joined the newly formed Communist Party in the early 1900s.
- The boss needs you, you don't need him is an expression from the Industrial Workers of the World, who envisioned "a world without bosses."
- Bosses beware — when we're screwed, we multiply
- Bread and Roses is an expression, the name of a poem, a song title, and a movie, derived from a picket sign carried by a woman striker in 1911 in Lawrence, Massachusetts, during what came to be called the Bread and Roses strike. The message on the homemade sign was, "We Want Bread, and Roses Too." The slogan calls for dignified working conditions as well as fair wages.
- Direct action gets the goods
- Don't mourn, organize! This expression is the familiar version of the "last words spoken" by Wobbly songwriter Joe Hill before his execution on a murder charge in Utah. In truth, the expression is part of a telegram sent to Bill Haywood, in which Joe wrote, "Goodbye, Bill, I die like a true blue rebel. Don't waste any time mourning. Organize!" It wasn't Joe's last telegram; he sent another in which he implored Haywood, "Could you arrange to have my body hauled to the state line to be buried? I don't want to be found dead in Utah."
- Dual unionism is the development of a union parallel to an existing labor union. The parallel dual union may exist for different tactical, philosophical, or strategic reasons.
- Dump the Bosses Off your Backs! From Songs of the Workers.
- A fair day's wage for a fair day's work The motto of the American Federation of Labor.
- Get it through industrial organization (Wobbly slogan)
- Hammering from without According to Paul Brissenden, this expression is the Americanized version of the French syndicalist term la pression extérieure, or external pressure, which was seen by some as an alternative to boring from within
- Instead of the conservative motto, "A fair day's wage for a fair day's work," we must inscribe on our banner the revolutionary watchword, "Abolition of the wage system." Response of the Industrial Workers of the World to the AFL motto, from the IWW Preamble.
- Kickin' ass for the working class...
- Labor is entitled to all it creates is an expression that originates in Ricardian socialist thought. The slogan was later adopted by Wendell Phillips in his 1870 speech, "Labor is entitled to all it creates."
- The longer the picket line, the shorter the strike
- No Gods, No Masters was a slogan first used during the 1912 Lawrence Textile Strike. It was since adopted by early 20th century feminists and later anarchists and members of the Occupy Movement.
- The only force that can break tyrannical rule is the one big union of all the workers (Wobbly slogan)
- Organize the workers to control the use of their labor power (Wobbly slogan)
- Right to work (for less) A phrase popularized by opponents of Right to work laws.
- The secret of power is organization (Wobbly slogan)
- Unions: the people who brought you weekends
- A victory for one is a victory for all
- Which side are you on? From the song of the same name by Florence Reece, written during the 1931 strike by coal miners in Harlan County, Kentucky.
- Workers of the world, awaken! is the title of an IWW marching song written by Joe Hill.
- Workers of the world, Unite!
- Workers of the world, unite! You have nothing to lose but your chains!
- Workingmen, Unite!
