= Bishop Moore =

Bishop Moore may refer to any of the following persons named Moore who served as a Bishop:

- Arthur James Moore, Bishop of the Methodist Episcopal Church, South, the Methodist Church and the United Methodist Church
- Benjamin Moore (bishop) (1748–1816), Bishop of the American Protestant Episcopal Church
- David Hastings Moore (1838–1915), Bishop of the Methodist Episcopal Church
- Bishop John Moore may refer to:
  - John Moore (bishop of Ely) (1646–1714), British scholar
  - John Moore (archbishop of Canterbury), Archbishop of Canterbury, 1783–1805
  - John Moore (bishop of St Augustine) (1834–1901), Bishop of St. Augustine, Florida
  - John Moore (Methodist bishop), Bishop of the Methodist Episcopal Church, South
  - John Moore (Bishop of Bauchi) (born 1942), Bishop of Bauchi, Nigeria
