= 1906 Colorado gubernatorial election =

- November 6, 1906
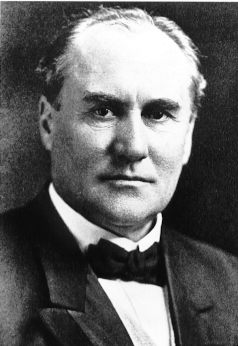

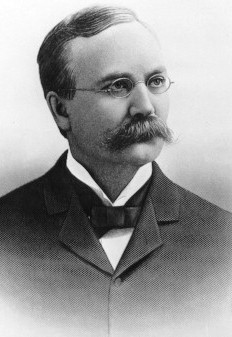

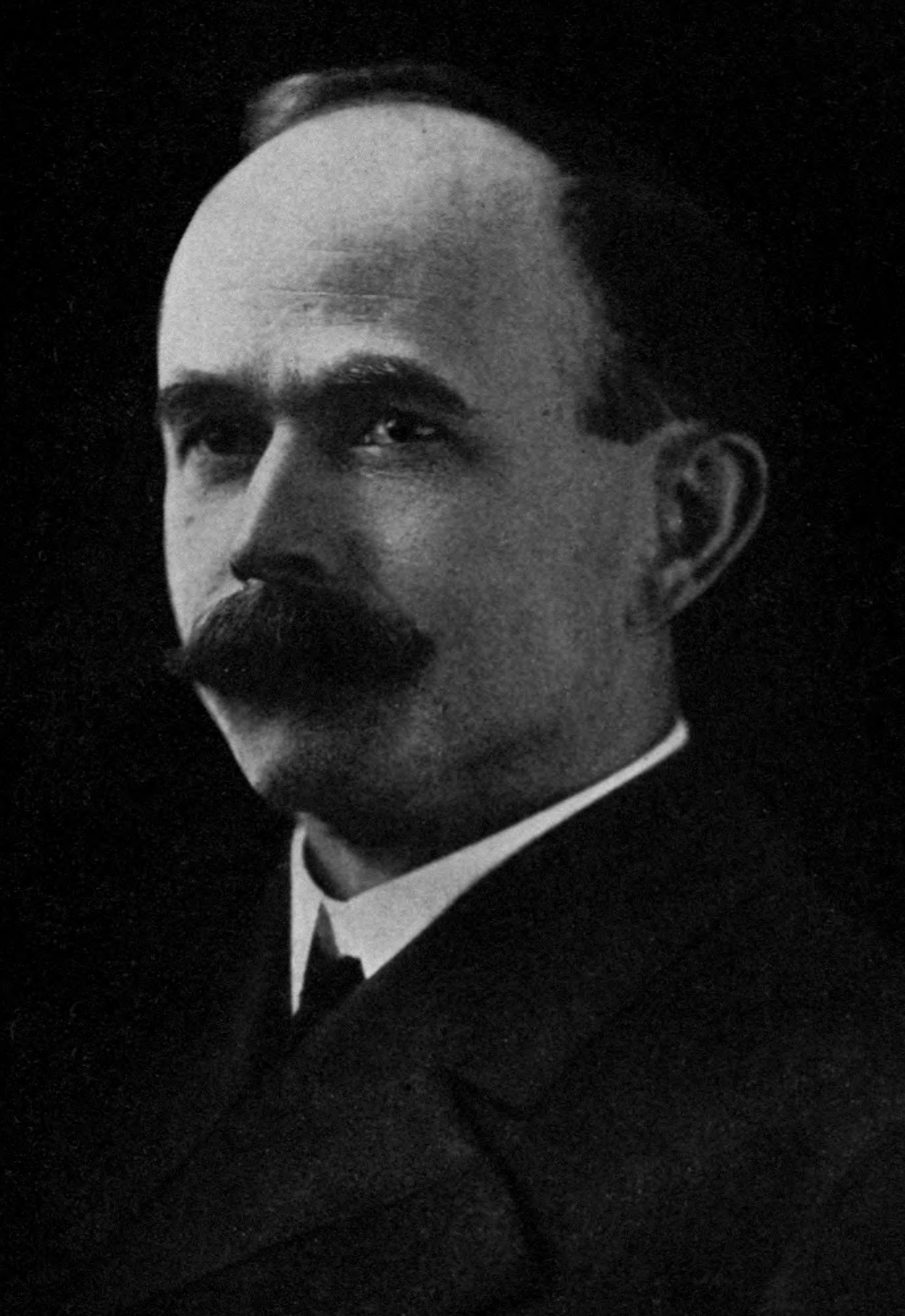

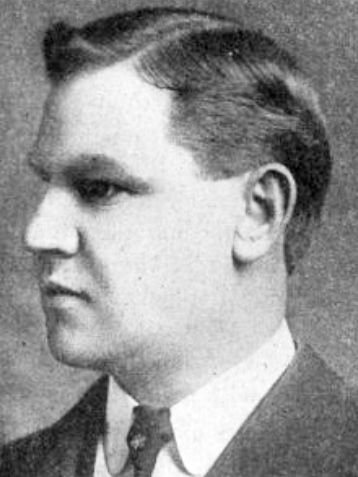
Nominee	Henry Augustus Buchtel	Alva Adams
Party	Republican	Democratic
Popular vote	92,602	74,416
Percentage	45.59%	36.63%
Nominee	Ben B. Lindsey	Bill Haywood
Party	Independent	Socialist
Popular vote	18,014	16,015
Percentage	8.87%	7.88%
- County results Buchtel: 20–30% 30–40% 40–50% 50–60% 60–70% 80–90% Adams: 30–40% 40–50% 50–60%
Governor before election
Jesse Fuller McDonald
Republican
Elected Governor
Henry Augustus Buchtel
Republican

The 1906 Colorado gubernatorial election was held on November 6, 1906. Republican nominee Henry Augustus Buchtel defeated Democratic nominee Alva Adams with 45.59% of the vote.

== General election ==
=== Candidates ===
Major party candidates

- Henry Augustus Buchtel, Republican
- Alva Adams, Democratic

Other candidates

- Ben B. Lindsey, Independent
- Bill Haywood, Socialist
- Frank C. Chamberlain, Prohibition

=== Results ===
1906 Colorado gubernatorial election
Party	Candidate	Votes	%	±%
Republican	Henry Augustus Buchtel	92,602	45.59%	−1.21%
Democratic	Alva Adams	74,416	36.63%	−14.01%
Independent	Ben B. Lindsey	18,014	8.87%	N/A
Socialist	Bill Haywood	16,015	7.88%	+6.81%
Prohibition	Frank C. Chamberlain	2,087	1.03%	−0.21%
Majority		18,186	8.96%	
Turnout		203,134		
Republican hold		Swing		
