= David C. Coates =

American politician

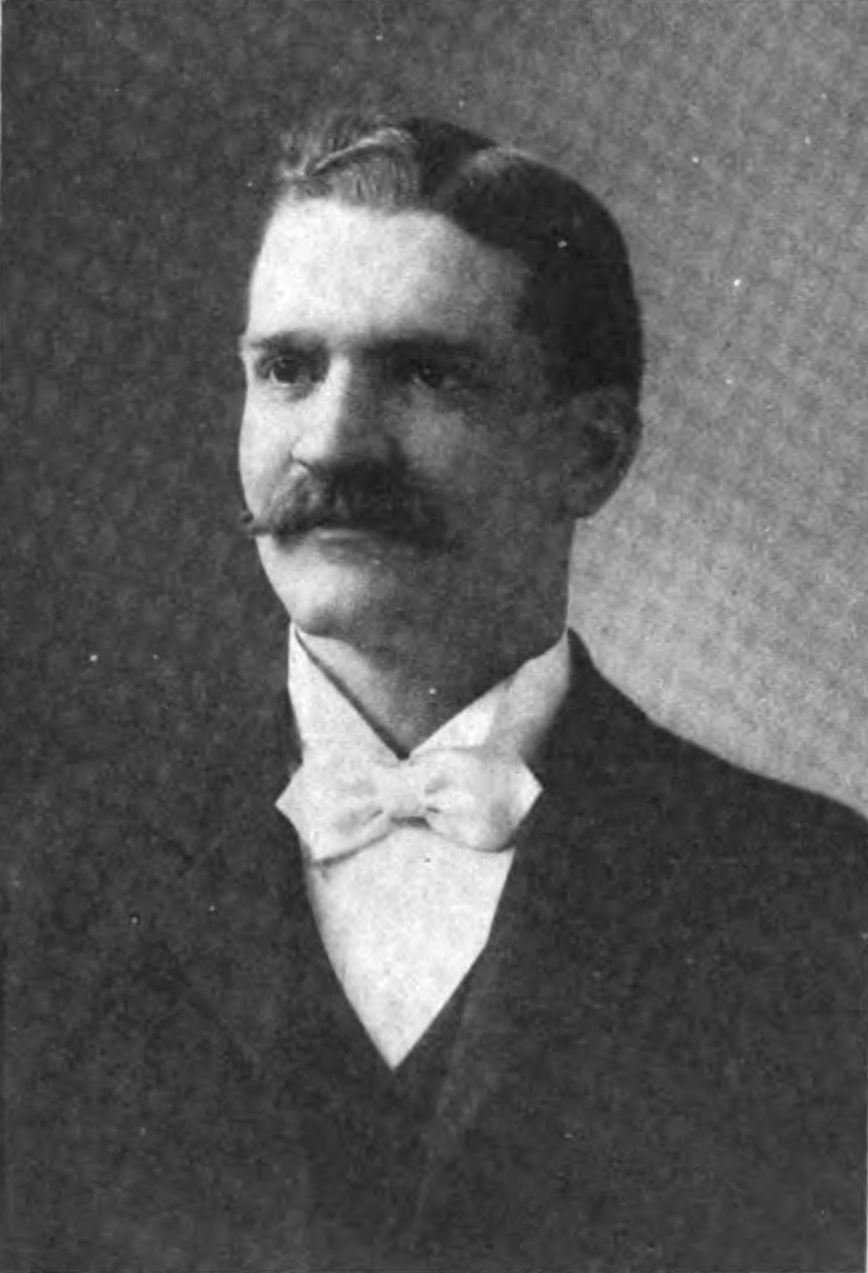

11th Lieutenant Governor of Colorado
- In office January 8, 1901 – January 13, 1903
- Governor: James Bradley Orman
- Preceded by: Francis Patrick Carney
- Succeeded by: Warren A. Haggott

Personal details
- Born: August 9, 1868 Brandon, County Durham, England
- Died: January 28, 1933 (aged 64) North Hollywood, California, U.S.
- Resting place: Hollywood Forever Cemetery
- Party: Democratic (before 1911); Populist (before 1911); Socialist (1911–1917); National (1917–1919)
- Other political affiliations: Silver Republican (1900); Nonpartisan League (1915–1917)
- Spouse: Sadie B. Pearce

David Courtney Coates (August 9, 1868 – January 28, 1933) was an American publisher and printer, labor union leader and socialist politician who served as the 11th Lieutenant Governor of Colorado, secretary and president of Colorado's State Federation of Labor, president of the American Labor Union and chairman of the National Party.

== Biography ==
Coates was born in Brandon, County Durham, England. His parents, George and Mary Coates, emigrated to the United States in 1881 and initially settled in Pittsburgh, Pennsylvania. In 1882 the family relocated to Pueblo, Colorado, where his father was employed as an engineer at the steelworks. Coates briefly worked in the mines before entering the publishing and printing industry. He worked for several newspapers in Colorado including the Pueblo Evening Star and Rocky Mountain News and founded several others, including the Pueblo Press, Colorado Chronicle and Pueblo Courier. He married Sadie B. Pearce on October 14, 1890, and a daughter, Hazel Marie, was born on February 1, 1893. He served as secretary of the Colorado State Federation of Labor between 1897 and 1899 and president between 1899 and 1901. He testified before the Industrial Commission as part of their investigation into mining on July 14, 1899. Coates was elected Lieutenant Governor of Colorado on a fusion ticket, having received the nominations of the Democratic, Populist and Silver Republican parties.

In 1901, Lieutenant Governor Coates volunteered, and was dispatched by Colorado Governor James Orman, to be part of a commission sent to Telluride to investigate an uprising of miners from the Western Federation of Miners during a strike. A shooting war was triggered when one of the strikers, believed to have been unarmed, had been shot through the throat by a deputized mine guard. In spite of intense pressure from others, Coates helped to persuade the governor not to send the Colorado National Guard. The commission was able to effect a settlement between the miners and the company, negotiating between union leader Vincent St. John and the Smuggler-Union Mine Company's general manager, Arthur L. Collins.

In 1903, Coates was elected vice president of the American Labor Union and became president of the union in 1905 following the resignation of Dan McDonald. In this role he attended the founding convention of the Industrial Workers of the World. Coates was offered the presidency of that organization, but declined to accept it. The IWW later abolished the office of the presidency. In his autobiography, Big Bill Haywood credited Coates with suggesting a slogan for the IWW: an injury to one is an injury to all. The slogan has since been used by a number of labor organizations. Between 1904 and 1906, Coates resided in Wallace, Idaho, where he printed and published the Idaho State Tribune.

Coates moved to Spokane, Washington in 1906, where he established Coates, Hughes & Coates publishing and printing company with his brother William and Harley L. Hughes. In 1911, he was elected city commissioner for public works on the socialist ticket and served in this role until 1914. He then moved to Fargo, North Dakota, where he served as editor of the Nonpartisan Leader, the official publication of the Nonpartisan League, between 1915 and 1917. Coates was a member of the Socialist Party of America for most of his life. He left the party over its pacifist policies and served as chairman of the short-lived National Party during World War I. In the 1920s, Coates moved to Hollywood, California, where he published the North Hollywood Sun. He collapsed and died at his home in North Hollywood, California in 1933 and is buried in the Hollywood Forever cemetery.

Political offices
Preceded by Francis Patrick Carney	Lieutenant Governor of Colorado; 1901–1902	Succeeded by Warren A. Haggott
