= John Calhoun Bell =

Populist U.S. Representative (1851–1933)

John C. Bell
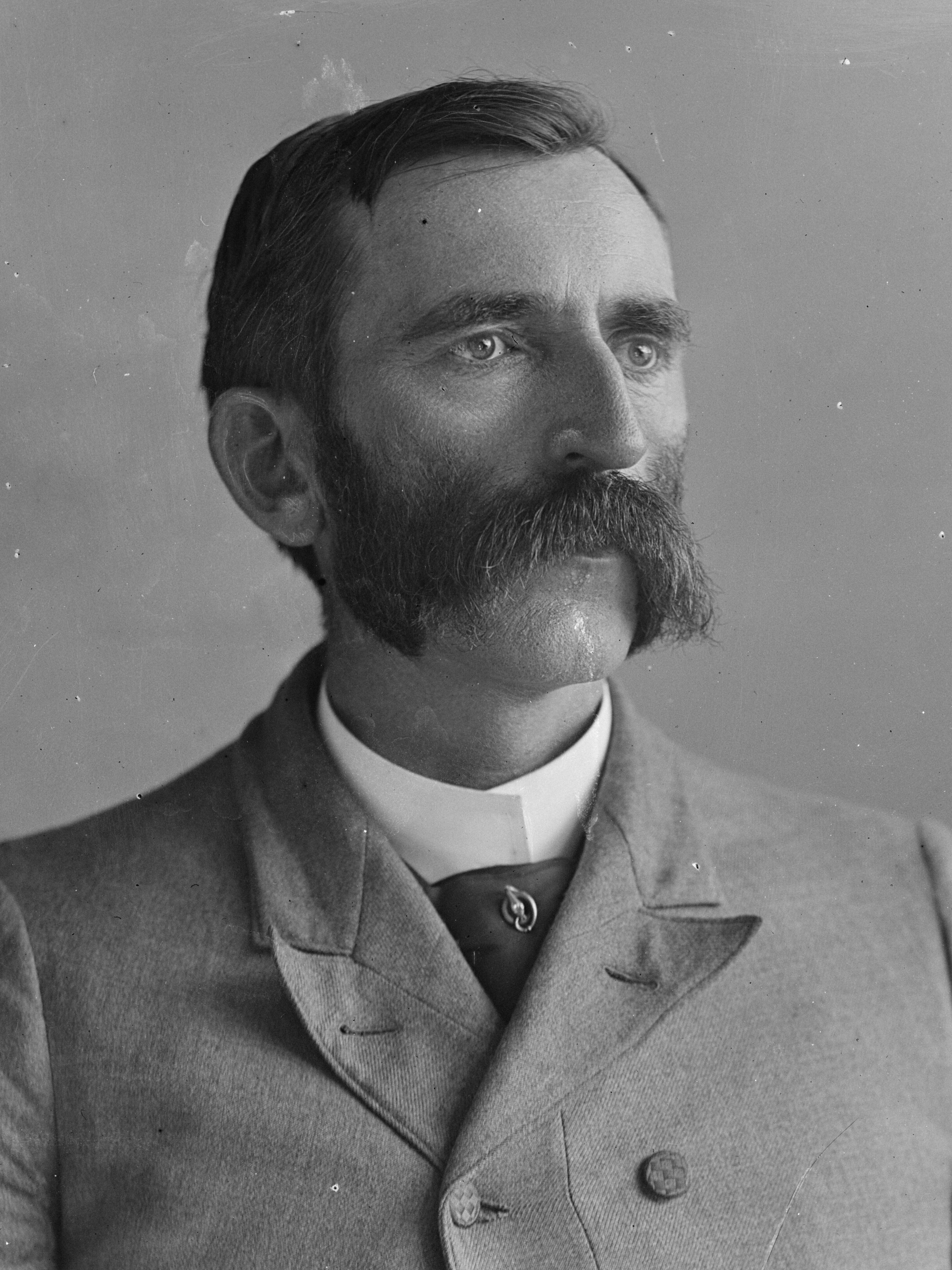
- Portrait by C. M. Bell c. 1891–1894

Member of the U.S. House of Representatives from Colorado's 2nd district
- In office March 4, 1893 – March 3, 1903
- Preceded by: District created
- Succeeded by: Herschel M. Hogg

Personal details
- Born: John Calhoun Bell; December 11, 1851 Sewanee, Tennessee, U.S.
- Died: August 12, 1933 (aged 81) Montrose, Colorado, U.S.
- Party: Populist
- Spouse: Susie Abernathy Bell
- Occupation: Lawyer, politician

John Calhoun Bell (December 11, 1851 – August 12, 1933) was an American lawyer and politician who served as a U.S. representative from Colorado from 1893 to 1903.

== Biography ==
Born near Sewanee, Tennessee, Bell was the son of Harrison and Rachel Laxon Bell. He attended public and private schools in Franklin County, and studied law in Winchester, Tennessee. He was admitted to the bar in 1874, and married Susie Abernathy in 1881.

== Career ==
Bell moved to Colorado in 1874 and commenced practice in Del Norte, Colorado, moving to Saguache, Colorado, the same year.

He served as county attorney of Saguache County, Colorado, from 1874 to May 1876. He moved to Lake City, Colorado, in 1876, and was elected county clerk of Hinsdale County, Colorado in 1878. He served as mayor of Lake City in 1885. He moved to Montrose, Colorado, in 1886 and continued the practice of law. He was judge of the seventh judicial district of Colorado from 1889 until his resignation in 1892, having been elected to Congress.

=== Congress ===
Elected as a Populist to the Fifty-third and to the four succeeding Congresses, Bell was United States Representative for the second district of Colorado from March 4, 1893 to March 3, 1903. He was an unsuccessful candidate for reelection in 1902 to the Fifty-eighth Congress.

=== Later career ===
He served as member of the United States Industrial Commission in 1900 and 1901. He resumed the practice of law in Montrose, Colorado; and served as judge of the Colorado Court of Appeals from 1913 to 1915, then resumed the practice of law. He served as a member of the State board of agriculture from 1931 to 1933.

== Death ==
Bell died in Montrose, Colorado, on August 12, 1933.

U.S. House of Representatives
Preceded by new district	Representative of the 2nd Congressional District of Colorado; 1893—1903	Succeeded by Herschel M. Hogg
