= An injury to one is an injury to all =

Motto of the Industrial Workers of the World

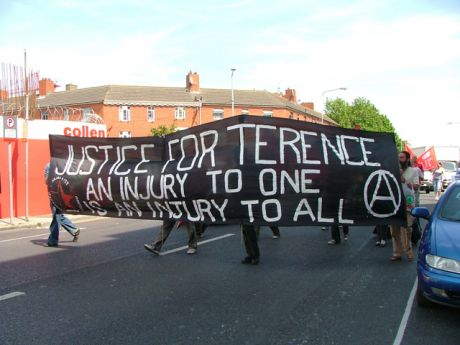
Marching demonstrators displaying the motto

An injury to one is an injury to all is a motto popularly used by the Industrial Workers of the World (IWW). In his autobiography, Bill Haywood credited David C. Coates with suggesting the phrase as a labor slogan for the IWW. The slogan reflects that the IWW is "One Big Union" and organizes many different types of skilled and unskilled workers. Since its adoption by the IWW, it has been used by a number of other labor organizations and appears in protest signage.

== Origin ==
The expression is similar to, and may be derived from, a slogan popularized in the prior quarter century by the Knights of Labor: "that is the best government in which an injury to one is the concern of all".

== Gallery ==
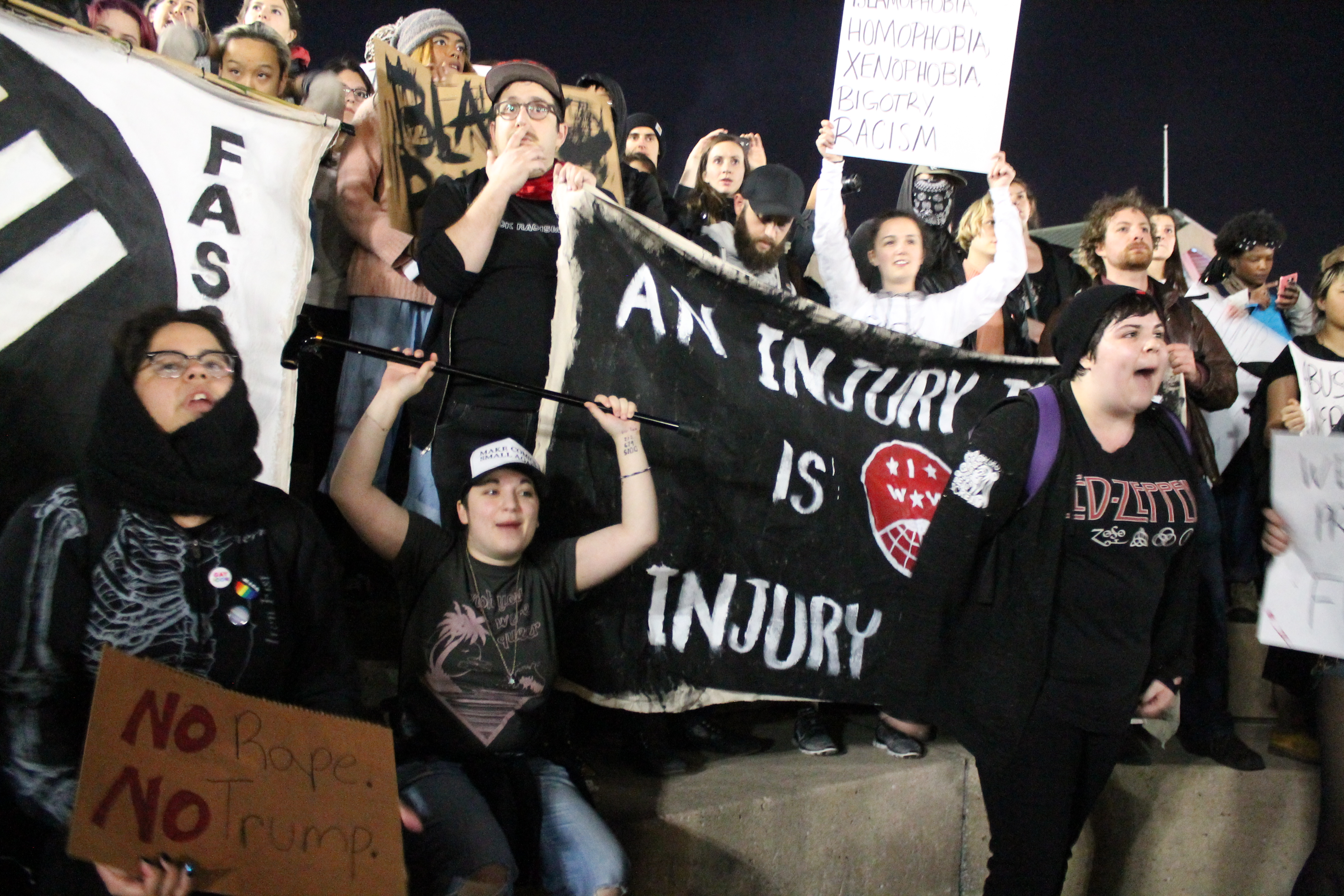
Motto on a banner at an anti-Trump IWW anti-fascist protest, November 2016 in Maryland

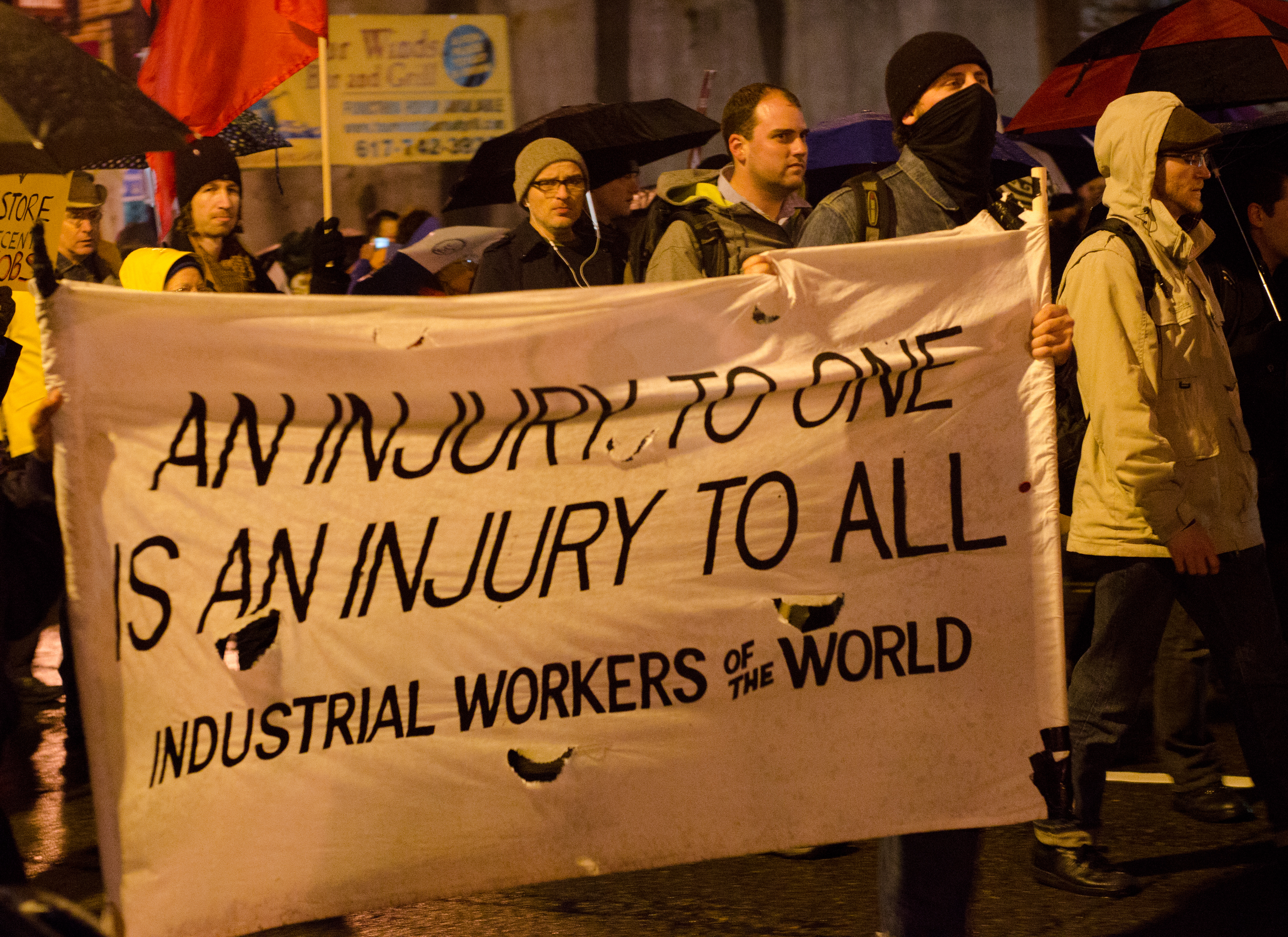
Occupy Boston, November 2011 in Massachusetts

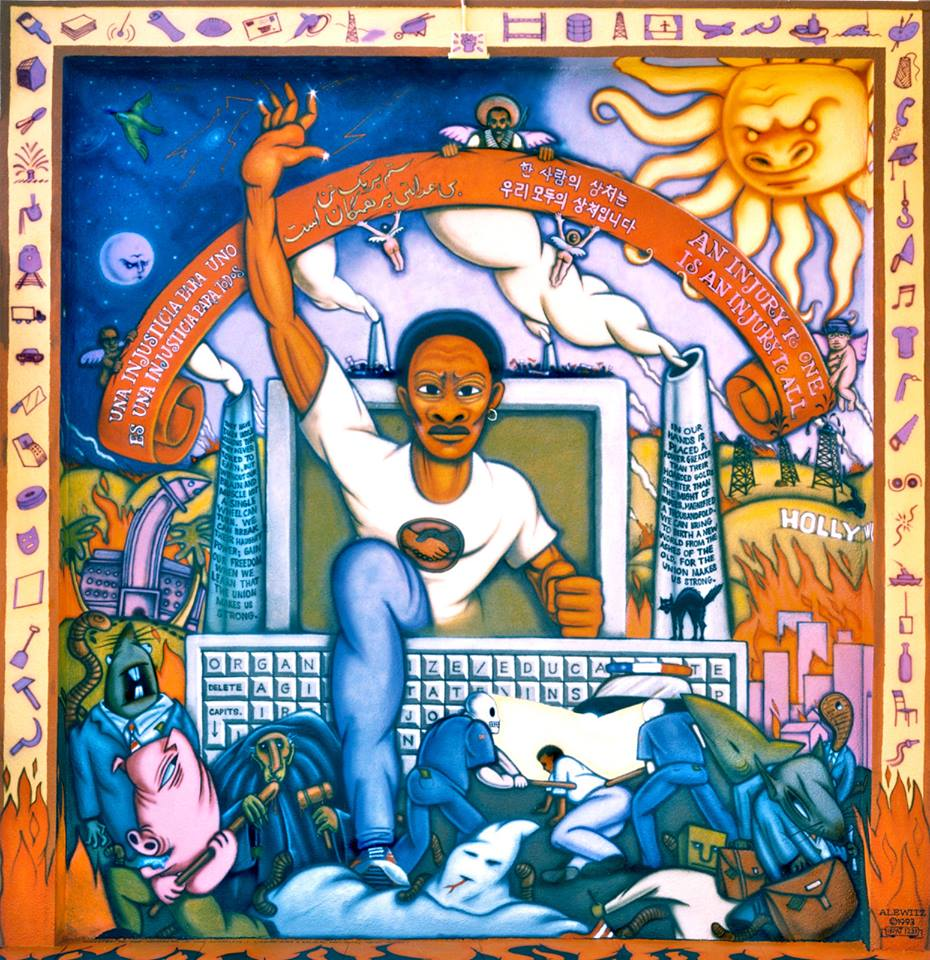
"An Injury to One is an Injury to All," a mural (now destroyed) by Mike Alewitz in Los Angeles, 1993

== See also ==
- Unus pro omnibus, omnes pro uno
