= Henry Augustus Buchtel =

American politician (1847–1924)

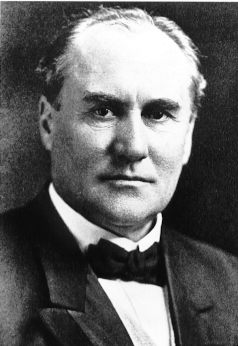

17th Governor of Colorado
- In office January 8, 1907 – January 12, 1909
- Lieutenant: Erastus Harper
- Preceded by: Jesse F. McDonald
- Succeeded by: John F. Shafroth

Personal details
- Born: September 30, 1847 Akron, Ohio
- Died: October 22, 1924 (aged 77) Denver, Colorado
- Party: Republican
- Spouse: Mary Stevenson (m. 1873)
- Children: 4

Henry Augustus Buchtel (September 30, 1847 – October 22, 1924) was an American minister, educator, and public official. He was the seventeenth governor of Colorado.

== Life and career ==
Henry Augustus Buchtel was born near Akron, Ohio on September 30, 1847, the son of Jonathan B. Buchtel, a physician, and Eliza Newcomer Buchtel. Within a couple of years of his birth, his parents relocated their family to Elkhart, Indiana. Henry was a younger cousin of John Richards Buchtel, the founder in 1870 of Buchtel College (later the University of Akron). In 1871, Henry's older brother, William, married Helen Barnum, a daughter of P. T. Barnum.

He graduated from Indiana Asbury (now DePauw) University in 1872 and was ordained to the Methodist Episcopal ministry. He married Mary Stevenson on February 4, 1873. The couple moved to Bulgaria where they served as missionaries from April until August 1873 when his wife's deteriorating health forced their return to the United States. Over the next twenty-six years, he served as pastor of congregations in Indiana, Colorado at Evans Chapel and Trinity Church, New York, and New Jersey. During his years as a minister, Henry and Mary had four children: Frost Craft (1875), Emma (1882), Henry Jr. (1896), and Mary (1898). Henry Jr. died in Denver from scarlet fever in 1901.

In 1899, Buchtel was chosen as chancellor of the University of Denver, officially assuming his duties in January 1900. At that time, the university had debts of around $175,000 and faced the possibility of foreclosure on its mortgages. The new chancellor began fundraising immediately, and managed to retire the debts by August 1903 although the university's finances remained precarious for many years afterward. Buchtel worked with William G. Evans, both a son of its founder, John Evans, and a trustee of the university, to place the institution's funding on a firmer foundation by organizing a series of fundraising campaigns and establishing an endowment for the school. Reviewing these efforts on behalf of the university, the Denver Post noted in 1924 that:

In twenty years under Dr. Buchtel's guidance, $1,750,000 was raised on his personal appeal for its development and it stands today backed by 20,000 subscribers . . .

In September 1906, after the Republican Party's nominee for governor, Phillip B. Stewart, withdrew from the race, a group of party officials, Franklin Brooks, George Stidger, and John F. Vivian, decided to offer the nomination to Chancellor Buchtel. Before accepting the trio's proposal to fill the vacancy on the ballot, Buchtel requested their promises that he would have absolute independence if elected. With their assurances, Buchtel became the Republican nominee. He was elected governor of Colorado in November and served one term from 1907 until 1909, while continuing to handle his duties as chancellor.

A stroke in September 1920 forced Dr. Buchtel to resign his position as chancellor the following December. Four years later, he suffered another stroke and, within a few days, died at his home in Denver on Wednesday, October 22, 1924. He was buried at Fairmount Cemetery in Denver.

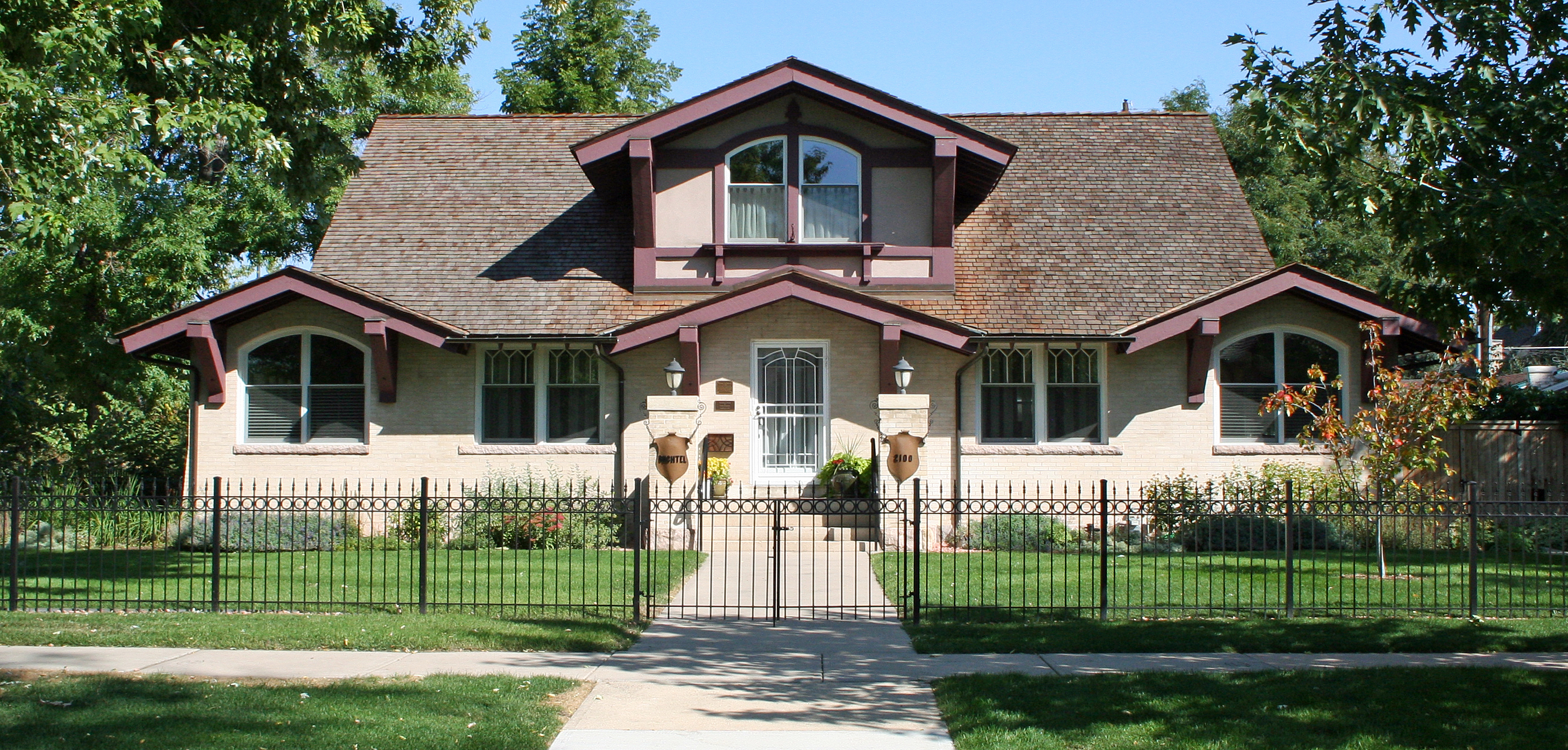
The Buchtel Bungalow

In 1988, the Buchtel Bungalow, located at 2100 S. Columbine St. just two blocks east of the University of Denver campus, was listed with the National Register of Historic Places. Finished in the first half of 1906, the house served as Governor Buchtel's residence from 1907 until 1909 and for the remaining years of his life. Today, Buchtel Bungalow is owned by the University of Denver and serves as the home of current Chancellor Jeremy Haefner.

In addition, Buchtel Boulevard in Denver was built and named to honor Dr. Buchtel.

== Notes ==
Party political offices
| Preceded by James Hamilton Peabody | Republican nominee for Governor of Colorado; 1906 | Succeeded by Jesse Fuller McDonald |
Academic offices
| Preceded by William Fraser McDowell | Chancellor of the University of Denver; 1899–1920 | Succeeded by Heber Reece Harper |
Political offices
| Preceded by Jesse Fuller McDonald | Governor of Colorado; 1907–1909 | Succeeded by John Franklin Shafroth |
