= Herschel M. Hogg =

American politician (1853–1934)

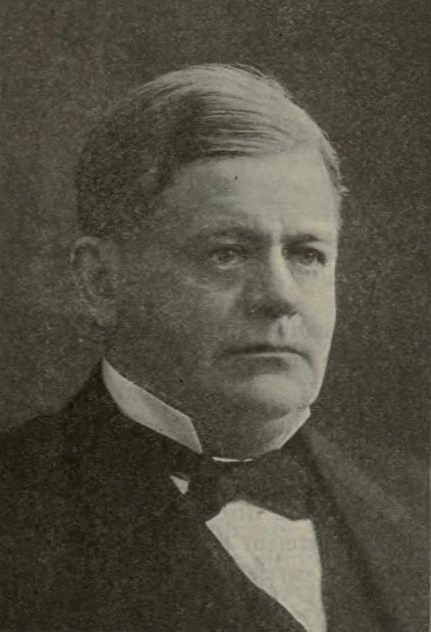

Member of the U.S. House of Representatives from Colorado's 2nd district
- In office March 4, 1903 – March 3, 1907
- Preceded by: John Calhoun Bell
- Succeeded by: Warren A. Haggott

Personal details
- Born: November 21, 1853 Youngstown, Ohio
- Died: August 27, 1934 (aged 80) Denver, Colorado
- Party: Republican
- Spouse: Josephine Houghtaling (m. 1880)
- Education: Monmouth College

Herschel Millard Hogg (November 21, 1853 – August 27, 1934) was a U.S. representative from Colorado.

== Early life and education ==
Born in Youngstown, Ohio, Hogg attended the common schools. He graduated with a Bachelor's degree from Monmouth College, Monmouth, Illinois, in June 1876. He studied law and received his Master's degree in 1879. He was admitted to the bar in Illinois in 1878.

== Career ==
He commenced practice in Indianola, Iowa. He moved to Gunnison, Colorado, in 1881 and resumed the practice of law. He served as City attorney of Gunnison in 1882 and 1883. He served as district attorney of the seventh judicial district of Colorado 1885-1893. He moved to Telluride, Colorado, in 1888, where he served as City attorney 1890-1898. He served as County attorney of San Miguel County, Colorado, from 1890 to 1902.

Hogg was elected as a Republican to the 58th and 59th Congresses (March 4, 1903 – March 3, 1907). He introduced a bill in 1906 to have Mesa Verde made a national park. Senator Thomas M. Patterson also introduced a bill in the Senate. It was signed into law by President Theodore Roosevelt on June 29, 1906.

He resumed the practice of law in Cortez, Colorado. He retired from political life in 1915. He engaged in mining, and resided in Denver, Colorado.

== Personal life ==
On June 17, 1880, he married Josephine Houghtaling in Indianola, Iowa. In 1899, the Hoggs built a house at 123 N. Aspen Street in Telluride, which is still called the Hogg House. They lived there for ten years. He also had a ranch at Deep Creek Mesa, four miles west of Telluride, still called Hogg Ranch. It was important for the development of dairy and cattle operations and cultivation of hay in the Telluride area. Both properties are considered of historic and cultural value.

He died on August 27, 1934, in Denver. He was interred in Crown Hill Cemetery.

U.S. House of Representatives
Preceded by John Calhoun Bell	Member of the U.S. House of Representatives from Colorado's 2nd congressional district March 4, 1903 – March 3, 1907	Succeeded by Warren A. Haggott
