= Warren A. Haggott =

American politician (1864–1958)

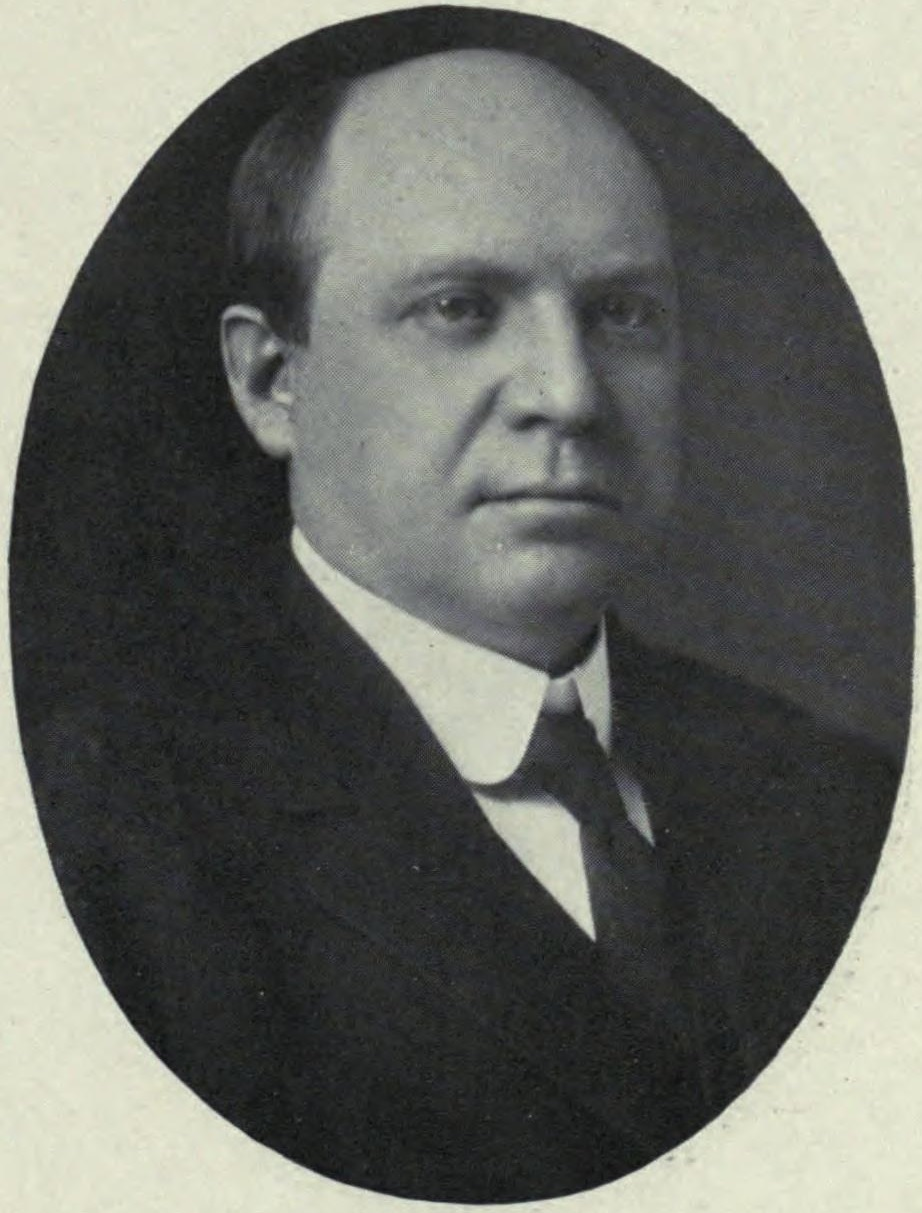

Member of the U.S. House of Representatives from Colorado's 2nd district
- In office March 4, 1907 – March 3, 1909
- Preceded by: Herschel M. Hogg
- Succeeded by: John Andrew Martin

12th Lieutenant Governor of Colorado
- In office January 13, 1903 – January 10, 1905
- Governor: James Hamilton Peabody
- Preceded by: David C. Coates
- Succeeded by: Jesse Fuller McDonald

Personal details
- Born: Warren Armstrong Haggott; May 18, 1864 Sidney, Ohio, U.S.
- Died: April 29, 1958 (aged 93) Denver, Colorado, U.S.
- Resting place: Fairmount Cemetery, Denver, Colorado, U.S.
- Party: Republican
- Occupation: Politician, lawyer, educator

Warren Armstrong Haggott (May 18, 1864 – April 29, 1958) was a U.S. representative from Colorado.

Born near Sidney, Ohio, Haggott attended the common schools, Sidney Grammar School, and Xenia (Ohio) College. He was graduated from Valparaiso (Indiana) College in 1886. He taught school in Dallas County, Texas, in 1886 and 1887. He moved to Idaho Springs, Colorado, in 1887. He taught school in Russell Gulch, Gilpin County, in 1887 and 1888. He was the school principal in Black Hawk in 1888 and 1889. He was the superintendent of public schools at Idaho Springs, Colorado from 1890 to 1899. He studied law. He was admitted to the bar in 1892 and commenced practice in 1899 at Idaho Springs, Colorado. He served as the 12th Lieutenant Governor of Colorado from 1902 to 1903. He served as chairman of the Republican State convention in 1904.

Haggott was elected as a Republican to the Sixtieth Congress (March 4, 1907 – March 3, 1909). He was an unsuccessful candidate in 1908 for reelection to the Sixty-first Congress. He moved to Denver, Colorado in 1911. He served as judge of the district court of the second judicial district of Colorado in 1921 and 1922. He served as president of Vermillion Oil Co. from 1925 to 1944. He resumed the practice of law until his retirement in 1951. He died in Denver, Colorado, April 29, 1958 and was buried in Fairmount Cemetery in Denver.

Political offices
Preceded by David C. Coates	Lieutenant Governor of Colorado; 1903–1905	Succeeded by Jesse Fuller McDonald
U.S. House of Representatives
Preceded by Herschel M. Hogg	Member of the U.S. House of Representatives from Colorado's 2nd congressional district 1907–1909	Succeeded by John Andrew Martin
