= Unus pro omnibus, omnes pro uno =

Unofficial motto of Switzerland

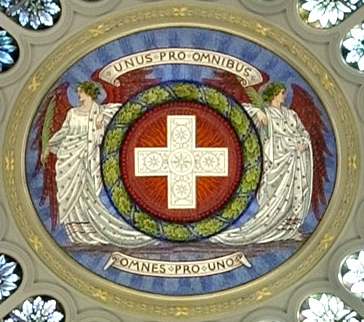
The motto in the central part of the dome of the Federal Palace (see entire dome)

Unus pro omnibus, omnes pro uno is a Latin phrase that means One for all, all for one. It is the unofficial motto of Switzerland, and the attitude is epitomized in the character of legendary Swiss hero Arnold von Winkelried. A French version, Un pour tous, tous pour un, was made famous by Alexandre Dumas in the 1844 novel The Three Musketeers.

== Early uses ==
In 1594, William Shakespeare uses it in his poem The Rape of Lucrece to characterize people who take massive risks, including the poem's villainous rapist king, Tarquin the Proud:

The aim of all is but to nurse the life
With honour, wealth, and ease, in waning age;
And in this aim there is such thwarting strife,
That one for all, or all for one we gage;
As life for honour in fell battle's rage;
Honour for wealth; and oft that wealth doth cost
The death of all, and all together lost.

Many of Shakespeare's contemporaries recognized him not only for plays like Hamlet and Macbeth, but poems like Lucrece and Venus and Adonis. Thus, his use of it could have contributed to more widespread usage, since these poems were commercial successes in his time.

In a meeting in 1618 between leaders of Bohemia's Catholic and Protestant communities, which resulted in the third defenestration of Prague, a representative of the Protestants read a letter affirming, "As they also absolutely intended to proceed with the execution against us, we came to an unanimous agreement among ourselves that, regardless of any loss of life and limb, honor and property, we would stand firm, with all for one and one for all... nor would we be subservient, but rather we would loyally help and protect each other to the utmost, against all difficulties."

== The Three Musketeers ==
Tous pour un, un pour tous (All for one, and one for all) is a motto traditionally associated with the titular heroes of the novel The Three Musketeers written by Alexandre Dumas père, first published in 1844. In the novel, it was the motto of a group of French musketeers named Athos, Porthos, Aramis and d'Artagnan who stayed loyal to each other through thick and thin.

On November 30, 2002, in an elaborate but solemn procession, six Republican Guards carried the coffin of Dumas from its original interment site in the Cimetière de Villers-Cotterêts in Aisne to the Panthéon. The coffin was draped in a blue velvet cloth inscribed with the motto.

== As a motto ==
=== Traditional motto of Switzerland ===
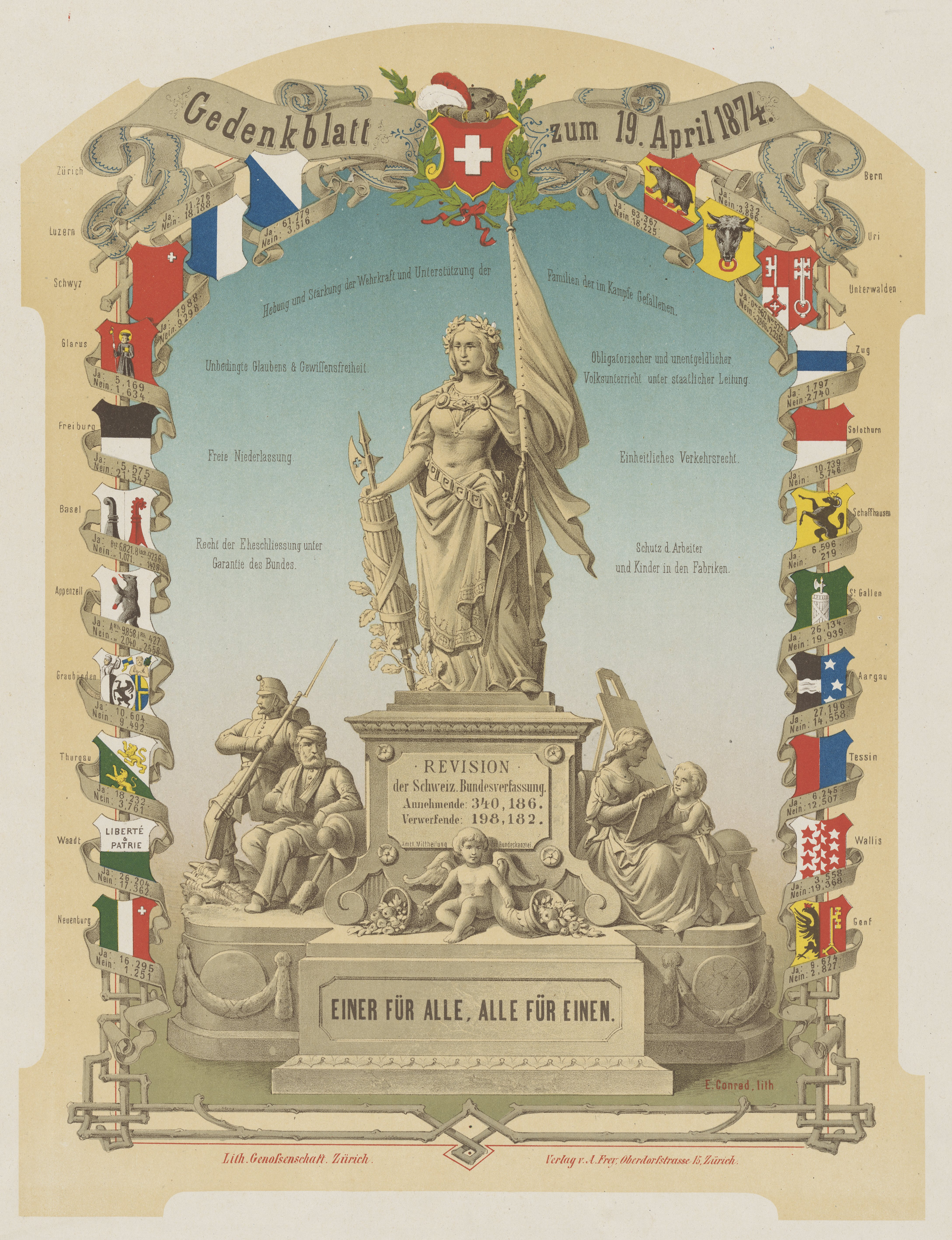
Memorial sheet to mark the revision of the Swiss federal constitution on April 19, 1874, by E. Conrad, c. 1874

Switzerland has no official motto defined in its constitution or legislative documents. The phrase, in its German (Einer für alle, alle für einen), French (Un pour tous, tous pour un), Italian (Uno per tutti, tutti per uno) and Romansh (In per tuts, tuts per in) versions, came into widespread use in the 19th century. After autumn storms had caused widespread floods in the Swiss Alps in late September and early October 1868, officials launched an aid campaign under that slogan, deliberately using it to evoke a sense of duty and solidarity and national unity in the population of the young nation. Switzerland had become a federal state only 20 years earlier, and the last civil war among the cantons, the Sonderbundskrieg, had been in 1847. Newspaper ads that used the motto to call for donations were run in all parts of the country.

The phrase was increasingly associated with the founding myths of Switzerland, which often also have solidarity as a central theme, to such a degree that "Unus pro omnibus, omnes pro uno" was even written in the cupola of the Federal Palace of Switzerland in 1902. It has since been considered the motto of the country. Politicians of all parties and regions acknowledge it as the motto of Switzerland.

=== Others ===
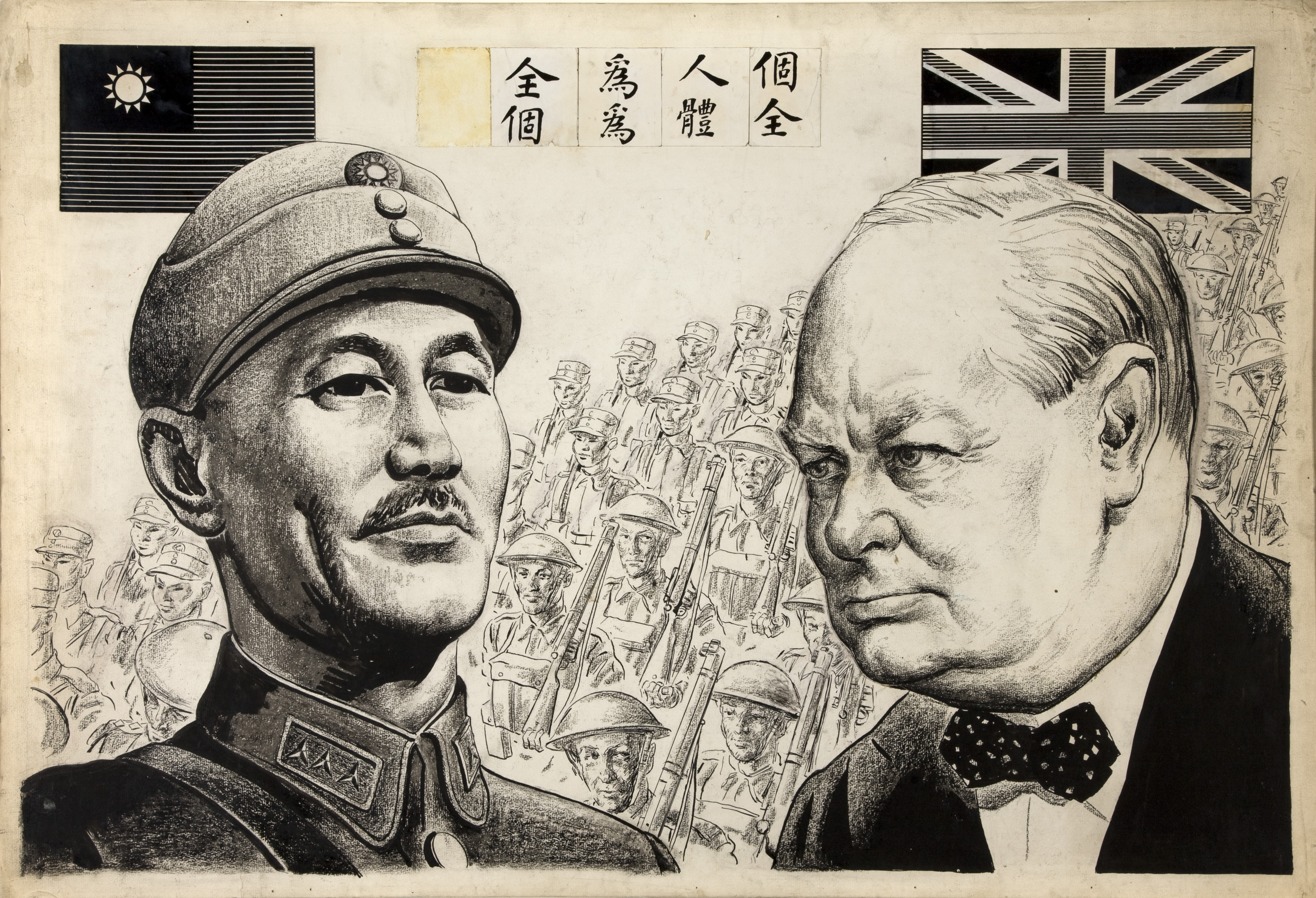
World War II-era poster showing the alliance between Republic of China (led by Chiang Kai-shek) and the British Empire (led by Winston Churchill). The Chinese text is 個人為全, 全體為個 (gèrén wéi quán, quántǐ wèi gè) — "All for one, one for all".

A part of the phrase in the Romanian language, Toți în unu ("All in One"), was briefly used as the motto of the United Principalities of Moldavia and Wallachia (a predecessor of modern Romania) between 1862 and 1866, when it was replaced by Nihil sine Deo ("Nothing without God").

The code of conduct for the Communist Party of Soviet Union adopted in 1961 and known as the Moral Code of the Builder of Communism contains the phrase in its fifth point.

The unrecognized Republic of South Maluku adopted a traditional phrase, Mena-Muria (sometimes translated as “all for one, one for all”) as its national motto.

== See also ==
- E pluribus unum
- An injury to one is an injury to all
