= William Fraser McDowell =

American bishop (1858–1937)

Rev. William Fraser McDowell A.B., S.T.B.
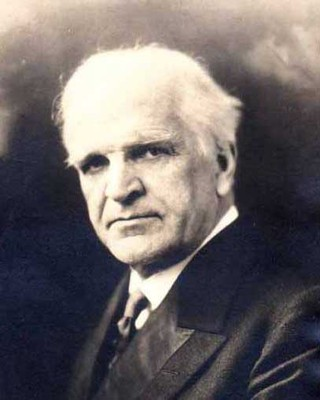
- McDowell in 1925
- Church: Methodist Episcopal Church

Personal details
- Born: February 4, 1858 Millersburg, Ohio
- Died: April 26, 1937 (aged 79)
- Education: Ohio Wesleyan University; Ohio University

Rev. William Fraser McDowell, A.B., S.T.B., (February 4, 1858 – April 26, 1937) was an American bishop of the Methodist Episcopal Church.

== Early life and education ==
McDowell was born in Millersburg, Ohio on February 4, 1858. He earned the A.B. degree in 1879 from Ohio Wesleyan University in Delaware, Ohio. He earned an S.T.B. degree at Boston University in 1882. While at Ohio Wesleyan, McDowell was the founding editor of The Phi Gamma Delta magazine.

== Ordained ministry ==
In 1892, McDowell was ordained by the North Ohio Annual Conference of the M.E. Church. McDowell served as a minister in Lodi, Ohio from 1882 to 1883. He then served in Oberlin, Ohio from 1883 to 1885, and served in Tiffin, Ohio from 1885 to 1890.

He then became the chancellor of the University of Denver, serving 1890–99. During this time he was also a member of the Colorado State Board of Charities and Corrections (1894–1899).

In 1899, he became the secretary of the Board of Education of the M.E. Church, serving until his election to the episcopacy. He also became a member of the International Committee of the YMCA.

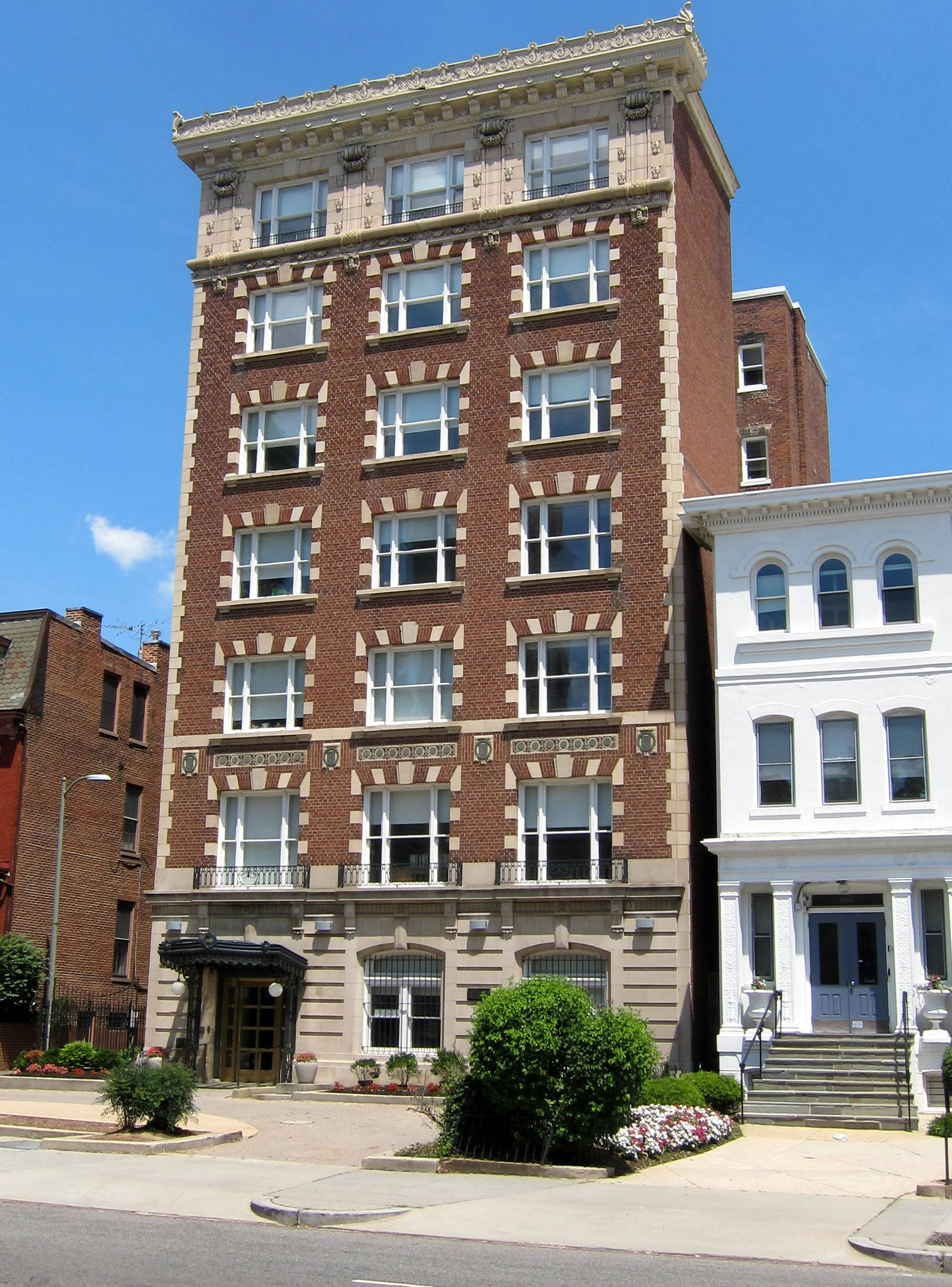
McDowell's former residence in Washington, D.C.

== Episcopal ministry ==
As a bishop, McDowell also served as president of the Religious Education Society (1905–06). He was a Yale lecturer on preaching, and was noted as a preacher to preachers.

Bishop McDowell died 26 April 1937 in Washington, D.C., and was buried at Oak Grove Cemetery in Delaware, Ohio.

== Works ==
- — (1897). "David Livingstone". In Ninde, W. X. (ed.). The picket line of missions: Sketches of the advanced guard. Eaton & Mains; Curts & Jennings. pp. 23–66. ISBN 0-8370-6278-0. OCLC 688537311.
- — (1902). "David Livingstone". Effective workers in needy fields. New York: Student volunteer movement for foreign missions & Caxton Press. pp. 1–34. OCLC 2210289.
- — (1904). "Go or send?". A call to advance: Addresses delivered before the Eastern Missionary Convention of the Methodist Episcopal Church, Philadelphia, Pa., October 13-15, 1903. pp. 47–62.
- — (1905). The revival: A symposium. Jennings and Graham; Eaton and Mains. ISBN 0-8370-6279-9. OCLC 669715741.
- — (1909). "An appreciation of Abraham Lincoln". Souvenir of the Lincoln day celebration commemorating the centennial anniversary of the birth of Abraham Lincoln. Cincinnati, OH. pp. 14–22.
- — (1909). The right sort of men for the ministry. New York: Student Young Men's Christian Association. OCLC 14142915.
- — (1910). In the school of Christ. Revell. OCLC 11349381. Reprinted as In the school of Christ. Cincinnati: Abingdon. 1923.
- — (1911). Impressions of Southern Asia: An interview. New York: Board of Foreign Missions of the Methodist Episcopal Church.
- — (1913). A man's religion: Letters to men. Eaton & Mains; Jennings & Graham. ISBN 0-7905-8705-X. OCLC 689291456.
- — (1915). "Address". Memorial exercises on the occasion of the semi-centennial anniversary of the assassination of Abraham Lincoln. Springfield, IL: Lincoln Centennial Association. pp. 41–63.
- — (1917). Good ministers of Jesus Christ: The Lyman Lectures on preaching, Yale University, 1917. Cincinnati: Abingdon Press. OCLC 1483028.
- — (1922). This mind. Cincinnati: The Methodist Book concern. OCLC 3191968.
- — (1924). Making a personal faith. Cincinnati: Abingdon. OCLC 3619771.
- — (1928). That I may save some: The Earl Lectures of the Pacific School of Religion. Cincinnati: Abingdon.
- — (1929). Them he also called. Cincinnati: Abingdon Press.
- — (1934). Creative men, our fathers and brethren. Cincinnati: Abingdon Press.
- — (n.d.). The appeal of the Christian college to men of wealth. The American Student Series. New York: The Board of Education of the Methodist Episcopal Church.
- —. Dangers that beset theological students.
- —. In all His offices.

== See also ==
- List of bishops of the United Methodist Church
- Category:Bishops of the Methodist Episcopal Church

Academic offices
Preceded by David Hastings Moore	Chancellor of the University of Denver; 1890–1899	Succeeded by Henry Augustus Buchtel
