= Arthur Cornforth =

American politician

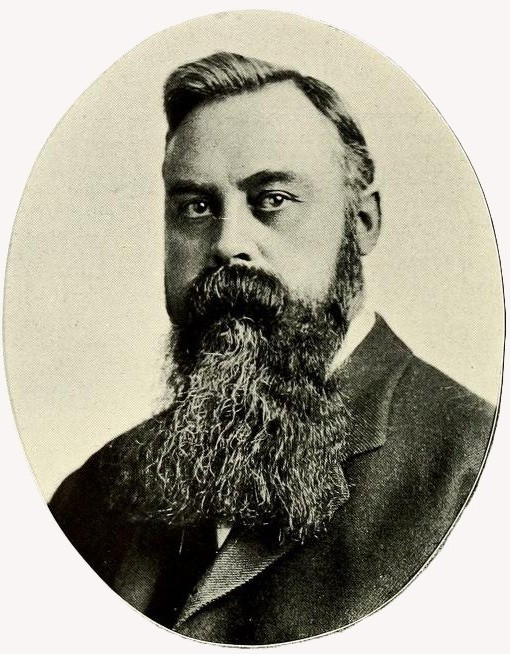
From Volume 1 of 1911's Sketches of Colorado

Arthur Cornforth (February 21, 1861 – August 5, 1938) was the 14th Lieutenant Governor of Colorado, serving from March to July 1905 under Jesse F. McDonald. He succeeded to the office after serving as President Pro Tempore of the Colorado Senate following McDonald's succession to Governor. He later resigned as Lieutenant Governor, leading to Fred W. Parks holding the office.

Cornforth was born in Smethport, McKean County, Pennsylvania. He was a member of the Colorado State Senate from 1903 to 1905 and again from 1911 to 1915.

Cornforth ran for mayor of Colorado Springs in 1913. Cornforth was a Colorado district judge from 1921 to 1938.

== Sources ==
Political offices
Preceded by Jesse F. McDonald	Lieutenant Governor of Colorado; March 17, 1905 – July 5, 1905	Succeeded by Fred W. Parks
