= Don't mourn, organize! =

Expression by Joe Hill

The cover of the compilation album which uses the phrase

"Don't mourn, organize!" is an expression, abridged from a statement by American labor activist and songwriter Joe Hill near the time of his death. Hill wrote the full statement in a telegram he sent to Bill Haywood, which stated, "Goodbye, Bill, I die like a true blue rebel. Don't waste any time mourning. Organize!" Hill followed that telegram with another: "Could you arrange to have my body hauled to the state line to be buried? I don't want to be found dead in Utah." In 1915, Hill was convicted and executed for the murder of John and Arling Morrison a year prior; he denied having committed the murders but, for reasons that remain a source of speculation, was unwilling to give an alibi during his trial.

Since the death of Hill, the phrase has been used both in association with other labour leaders' deaths and on the occasion of severe defeats. It is particularly popular within the Industrial Workers of the World.

The phrase is popular enough in its association with Joe Hill and the labour movement that it was the title of a music compilation made in 1990 and released by Smithsonian Folkways. The full title is Don't Mourn — Organize!: Songs of Labor Songwriter Joe Hill.

In 2010, after the death of Howard Zinn, a Boston Globe article was titled with this phrase.

In 2017, activists used the phrase to motivate protest against US President Donald Trump and his administration.
