= Fred W. Parks =

American politician

Fred W. Parks (September 1, 1871 – July 24, 1941) was the 15th Lieutenant Governor of Colorado, United States, serving from July 1905 to January 1907 under Jesse Fuller McDonald. Originally from Genesco, New York, Parks moved to Denver, Colorado in 1893. He earned his law degree in 1895 after studying at the University of Denver and the Colorado State University. A Republican, Parks was elected to the state Senate in 1897 and re-elected in 1904.

Parks was hospitalized in Denver with two bullet wounds to his chest after a suicide attempt on June 21, 1941, and died four days later after contracting pneumonia.

Political offices
Preceded by Arthur Cornforth	Lieutenant Governor of Colorado; 1905–1907	Succeeded by Erastus Harper
