= David Hastings Moore =

American bishop

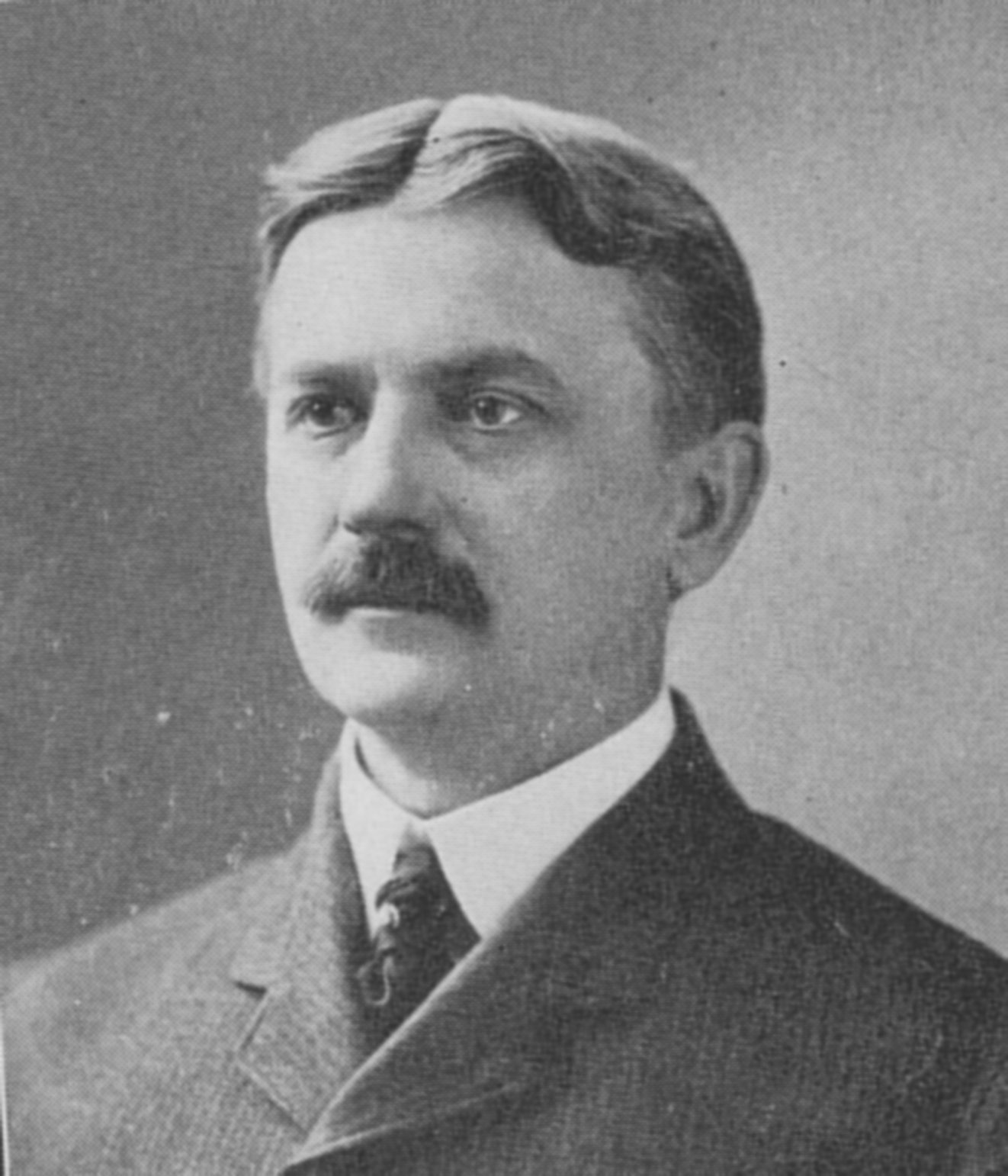
- David Hastings Moore circa 1904
- Born: September 4, 1838; Athens
- Died: November 23, 1915 (aged 77); Cincinnati
- Education: Ohio University
- Spouse: Julia Sophia Carpenter (m. 1860; died 1911)

David Hastings Moore (September 4, 1838 – November 23, 1915) was an American bishop of the Methodist Episcopal Church, elected in 1900. He gained notability as a Union Army officer in the American Civil War, as a pastor, as the editor of a Methodist periodical, and as a university chancellor.

== Birth and early life ==
David was born September 4, 1838, in Athens, Ohio, a son of Eliakim Hastings Moore, a U.S. Congressman. David converted to the Christian faith in 1855. He married Julia Sophia Carpenter, also of Athens, on June 21, 1860. She died in 1911, leaving the couple's six children.

== Education and military service ==
David graduated from the Ohio University in 1860 with the A.B. degree. He earned the A.M. degree from O.U. in 1863. He also was awarded the honorary degrees D.D. and LL.D.

In May 1862 David volunteered as a chaplain in the Union Army during the American Civil War, becoming a captain commanding an Ohio Company at Harper's Ferry when General Miles surrendered that post. Released on parole, he was soon exchanged and re-entered the service as a major, then was promoted to lieutenant-colonel. He had command of the 125th Ohio Infantry (a regiment dubbed the "Ohio Tigers" by General Thomas of Chickamauga) for almost the entire Atlanta campaign, his colonel having been placed in command of a brigade. Having been wounded, after the fall of Atlanta, his health being impaired, he returned to civilian life in Ohio, where he was immediately re-employed as a pastor.

== Ordained and academic ministries ==
David entered the ordained ministry of the M.E. Church in 1860, admitted as a probationer in the Ohio Annual Conference. His pastoral ministry actually began in 1855, when he was appointed pastor of the Second Street M.E. Church in Zanesville, Ohio (serving there until 1868, before and after military service). Moore subsequently served these appointments: St. Paul's M.E. in Delaware, Ohio (1868–70); Wesley Chapel in Columbus, Ohio (1870–72); and Trinity M.E. in Cincinnati (1872–75), having transferred his conference membership to the Cincinnati Annual Conference in 1872.

Moore became the president of the Cincinnati Wesleyan Female Seminary (aka Cincinnati Wesleyan College) in 1875, serving until 1880. He then followed fellow Athens, Ohio-born Methodist Earl Cranston to Colorado, where he became the president of the Colorado Seminary. As such Moore also became the first chancellor of the University of Denver (which the Colorado Seminary became), which he organized under favorable auspices, serving in this capacity from October 1880 to June 1889. He also served as the pastor of Evans Memorial Chapel at this time, assigned to this role in 1883.

== Editorial ministry ==
Moore became the Editor of the Western Christian Advocate, an important Methodist publication of the day, in 1889. His editorials championed the rights of women (regarding membership in General Conference, which they were denied at that time) and the rights of the "Freedmen" (both in the church and outside of it).

== Episcopal ministry ==
Moore was made a bishop by the 1900 General Conference of the M.E. Church. He was initially assigned as Bishop of China, Japan and Korea, serving there four years, during the time of the Boxer uprising. Moore also wrote a vivid description of the war between Japan and Russia during this time.

Following his four years service in the Far East, Moore was assigned successively to Portland, Oregon (1904–1908), and Cincinnati, Ohio (1908–1912). He retired at the 1912 General Conference.

In 1915 Moore wrote a biography of his friend, fellow-Ohioan and Bishop John Morgan Walden.

== Death and burial ==
Moore died November 23, 1915, on a train going to Cincinnati. He was buried in Athens, Ohio.

== Selected writings ==
- "Introduction", Echoes from Peak and Plain, I.H. Beardsley, 1898.
- Tribute to Elizabeth Walden, pamphlet, 1900.
- "Introduction", Life of Emily J., by Thomas Harwood, 1903.
- Address: The Open Door in Eastern Asia, First General Missionary Convention, Cleveland, 1903.
- John Morgan Walden: Thirty-fifth Bishop of the Methodist Episcopal Church, 1915.
- Bishop Moore also wrote a description of the Russo-Japanese War.

== See also ==
- List of bishops of the United Methodist Church

Academic offices
Preceded by (new office)	Chancellor of the University of Denver; 1880–1889	Succeeded by William Fraser McDowell
