= Jesse Fuller McDonald =

American politician (1858–1942)

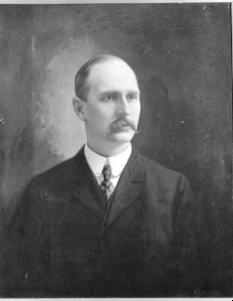

16th Governor of Colorado
- In office March 17, 1905 – January 8, 1907
- Lieutenant: Arthur Cornforth; Fred W. Parks
- Preceded by: James H. Peabody
- Succeeded by: Henry A. Buchtel

13th Lieutenant Governor of Colorado
- In office March 17, 1905
- Governor: James H. Peabody
- Preceded by: Warren A. Haggott
- Succeeded by: Arthur Cornforth

Personal details
- Born: June 30, 1858 Ashtabula, Ohio, U.S.
- Died: February 25, 1942 (aged 83) Denver, Colorado, U.S.
- Party: Republican

Jesse Fuller McDonald (June 30, 1858 – February 25, 1942) was an American public official, civil engineer and surveyor, who served as the 16th governor of Colorado from 1905 to 1907.

== Biography ==
McDonald was born in Ashtabula, Ohio, on June 30, 1858. After completing his education in Ohio's public school system, he studied civil engineering and surveying. He moved to Leadville, Colorado, in 1879, and started his career in mining. Five years later, he formed a partnership with George M. Robinson, and became the owner of several lucrative mines, including the Harvard, Penrose and El Dorado.

McDonald entered politics as mayor of Leadville, a position he held from 1899 to 1905. He served in the Colorado State Senate in 1902, and as Colorado's lieutenant governor briefly on March 17, 1905. Alva Adams won the 1904 gubernatorial election, and took office in January 1905. However, the Republican candidate James H. Peabody contested the election, and the predominantly Republican legislature forced Governor Adams to step down. The office was allocated to Peabody, but on the condition he would immediately resign. Lieutenant Governor Jesse F. McDonald succeeded him, and in the span of one day Colorado had three different governors.

During McDonald's tenure, he advocated the protection of state lands, and personally appraised property guaranteeing the state would be granted a reasonable price. A law was enacted making it illegal for employees to picket and hinder workers who were trying to enter mines, and Colorado's income flourished with the arrival of several large sugar beet companies into the area. McDonald did not seek reelection in 1906, but ran unsuccessfully in the 1908 gubernatorial election. He stayed active in public service, serving as chair of the Republican State Central Committee from 1910 to 1914, and again from 1931 to 1934. He also devoted his time to the American Mining Congress, the Colorado Mining Association, and the State Metal Mining Fund.

Jesse McDonald died on February 25, 1942; his ashes were scattered around Denver.

== See also ==
- Governor of Colorado
- Lieutenant Governor of Colorado
- State of Colorado

Party political offices
Preceded by Henry Augustus Buchtel	Republican nominee for Governor of Colorado; 1908	Succeeded by John B. Stephen
Political offices
Preceded by Warren A. Haggott	Lieutenant Governor of Colorado; March 1905	Succeeded by Arthur Cornforth
Preceded by James Hamilton Peabody	Governor of Colorado; 1905–1907	Succeeded by Henry Augustus Buchtel
