= Chester M. Alter =

Chemist and educator (1906–2006)

Chester M. Alter (1906–2006) served as the twelfth Chancellor at the University of Denver (DU) from 1953 to 1967. He was a scientist and an educator. He worked on the Manhattan Project during World War II.

== Background ==
Chester M. Alter was born in rural Indiana on 21 March 1906. Alter earned his bachelor's degree from Ball State Teachers College in 1927 and his master's degree in 1928 from Indiana University Bloomington. He also completed some graduate work at the University of Pittsburgh during the 1928–1929 academic year. He married Arvilla Morrison in 1933 and had a son, Richard David Alter, six years later. In 1936, Alter earned his Ph.D. in chemistry from Harvard University.

== Career ==
Alter began his career as a teacher in the Indiana Public Schools. He later taught at Harvard and Boston University. He worked at Boston University as an instructor in chemistry from 1934 to 1953, becoming Dean of the graduate school in 1946. Alter was recruited by the U.S. War Department to work on the Manhattan Project during World War II. This project resulted in the development of the atomic bomb. For his contributions, Alter was awarded a bronze medal and a Certificate of Merit. He also served as a consultant for the Research and Development Board of the U.S. Department of Defense. In 1953, Alter was offered the position of chancellor at the University of Denver.

Alter was the twelfth chancellor of the University of Denver serving from 1953 to 1967. During his term of office, he initiated the construction of the Boettcher Science Center (1963), Cherrington Hall (1965), the Mass Communications Building, (1961) the Business Administration Building (1968), the Law Center (1965) Johnson-McFarlane Residence Hall (1960), Centennial Residence Hall (1961) and Centennial Residence Towers (1963). The DU campus grew from 75 acres to 125 acres during his tenure. Alter increased faculty salaries and was instrumental in attracting outstanding scholars such as Arnold Toynbee (visiting professor) and Averell Harriman (speaker) to the university.

In 1961, Alter ended the University of Denver Football Program. His administration determined that expenditures on football programs were taking funding away from other more important programs. Alter wanted to see more funding for academic projects and intramural sports, which he thought would be of greater benefit to the entire University community. In 1964, during the DU centennial celebration, Alter was honored with the Evans Award from the Alumni Association of the university.

After leaving the University of Denver in 1967, Alter served as a trustee in organizations including: the Gates Foundation, the Central City Opera Association, the Young Men's Christian Association (YMCA) and the George W. Clayton Trust. He was the first non-lawyer to be an officer of the American Judicature Society. In 1980, he was honored with the Justice Award for his service. The Justice Award is given for major contributions to improving the administration of justice. Alter also served in various scientific and professional organizations such as the American Chemical Society, the American Association for the Advancement of Science and the American Association of University Professors.

== Arboretum ==
The Chester M. Alter Arboretum at the University of Denver was opened on 30 April 1999, to recognize both his work and influence as the twelfth chancellor of the university, as well as his well-known love for trees. David Christophel, the director of the arboretum, and arborist Marc Hathaway designed the arboretum to beautify the DU campus with trees. Alter died in Santa Fe, New Mexico, in 2006 at the age of 99.
