= Heber Harper =

Heber Reece Harper (1885 – 1969) served as the fourth chancellor of the University of Denver (DU) from 1922 to 1927. Harper was born in Manchester, England in 1885. He received degrees in theology from both Boston University and Allegheny College. While at DU Harper established the Social Science Foundation which eventually grew into the Graduate School of International Relations. After serving as DU’s chancellor he earned a PhD in philosophy from Columbia University in 1931 and remained there to teach for five years. In 1936 he was appointed regional director of the social security office in Denver. During World War II he served as a member of the US State Department staff. Harper made two separate personal $100,000 contributions to DU, the first in 1961 for the Mary Reece Harper Humanities Garden in memory of his mother and the second in 1966 to the DU Humanities Endowment Fund. He retired in 1952 and died in October 1969 at the age of 84.

== Sources ==
- University of Denver. Chancellor Haber Harper Collection. University Archives.
- University of Denver. Chancellor Heber Harper personnel file. University Archives.
