= Henry Arnold =

Henry Arnold may refer to:

- Henry Arnold (sculptor) (1879–1945), French sculptor
- Henry H. Arnold (1886–1950), American general officer
- Henry J. Arnold (born 1866), mayor of Denver, Colorado

== See also ==
- Harry Arnold (disambiguation)
- Henry H. Arnhold (1921–2018), American banker
