= Tom Loftin Johnson (artist) =

American artist (1900–1963)

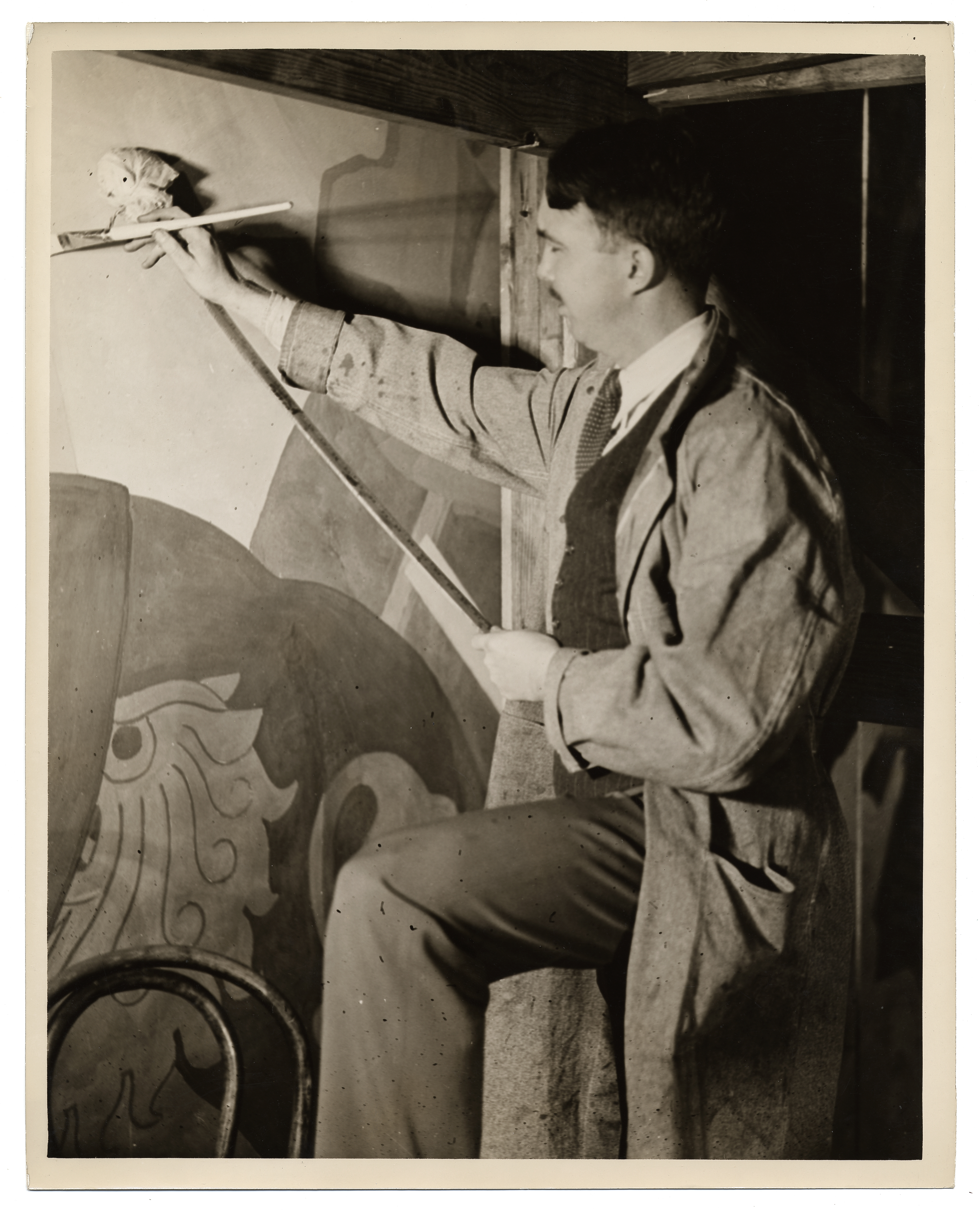
- Tom Loftin Johnson in 1938
- Born: October 5, 1900; Denver, Colorado, US
- Died: June 25, 1963 (aged 62); New York City, US (Note: An online image shows that his gravestone in Denver's Fairmount Cemetery reads "Tom Loftin Johnson – Born Denver, Colorado 1900 – Died Mt. Kisco, New York 1963". Mount Kisco is approximately 30 miles (48 km) north of New York City.)
- Education: École des Beaux-Arts; Yale School of Art
- Occupations: Artist, Educator
- Employer: West Point
- Known for: Panorama of Military History at West Point; American Pieta at the Carnegie Museum of Art; Murals at Fort Niagara State Park
- Title: Major

Major Tom Loftin Johnson (October 5, 1900 – June 25, 1963) was an American painter and an art teacher at West Point. He created public murals – the largest of which was 70 feet (21 m) long. His American Pietà painting, which won $1,000 in the 1941 Carnegie International contest, was intended to highlight the race problem in the United States. A Pietà is meant to show the Virgin Mary holding the crucified Jesus. In Johnson's American Pietà, the black mother holds her lynched son whilst others hide his tortured body.

== Biography ==
Tom Loftin Johnson was born in Denver, Colorado, in October 1900. He was trained at the Yale School of Art, where he illustrated campus humor magazine The Yale Record. After Yale, he trained at the École des Beaux-Arts in Paris.

Johnson's father, Henry V. Johnson, was Mayor of Denver during 1899–1901, and his father's cousin, the like-named Tom L. Johnson, was Mayor of Cleveland during 1901–1909.

Johnson married Sophie Connett in 1928; he died in June 1963 in New York City. It is said that Johnson requested that his remains be placed with a plaque on his West Point mural with the inscription: "He gave his best to West Point". To date, this has not been done, even when the mural was restored in 2006.

== Works ==
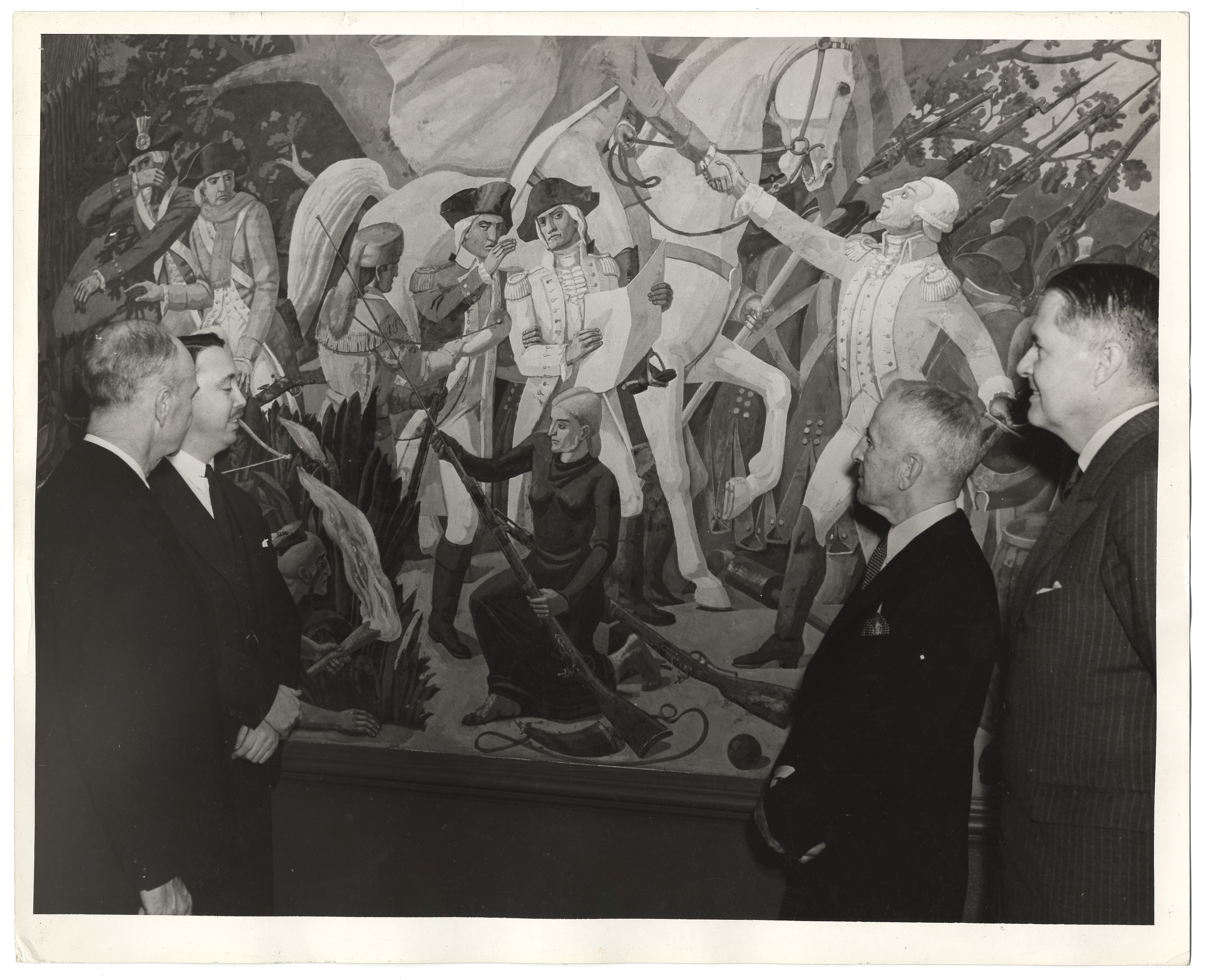
Johnson during a celebration of his work

Johnson is known for the government-funded murals he created during the Depression. Panorama of Military History, at the United States Military Academy in West Point, New York, is probably his best-known work, covering the south wall, with Edward Shepherd Creasy's Fifteen Decisive Battles of the World. This is the largest American mural using egg tempera. The 70-foot-long (21 m) mural required the yolks of 35 dozen fresh eggs mixed with oil to make the paint. Johnson was paid $30 a week and his assistant $20. Johnson chose the 20 globally most important battles including those that featured Napoleon, Joan of Arc, and Hannibal.

American Pieta – Carnegie Museum of Art

Johnson also painted five murals at The Officer's Club at Fort Niagara State Park, which commemorate the history of the 28th regiment from its founding in 1905.

Johnson won $1,000 in the Carnegie International Art contest of 1941. Because the Second World War was in full progress, the committee had been obliged to accept only the 5,000 American entries. Although some considered that the entries were poor, it was Johnson who was chosen as the winner. He had entered a painting called American Pietà, which instead of showing the Virgin Mary cradling the crucified Jesus, showed an African American family group after it had just been given back the body of a lynched man. The painting was unapologetically anti-racist and documented the pain of the people involved, showing the grief and giving indications of the sadistic castrations that usually accompanied racial lynchings.
