= John Harper (mayor) =

American politician (1825–1874)

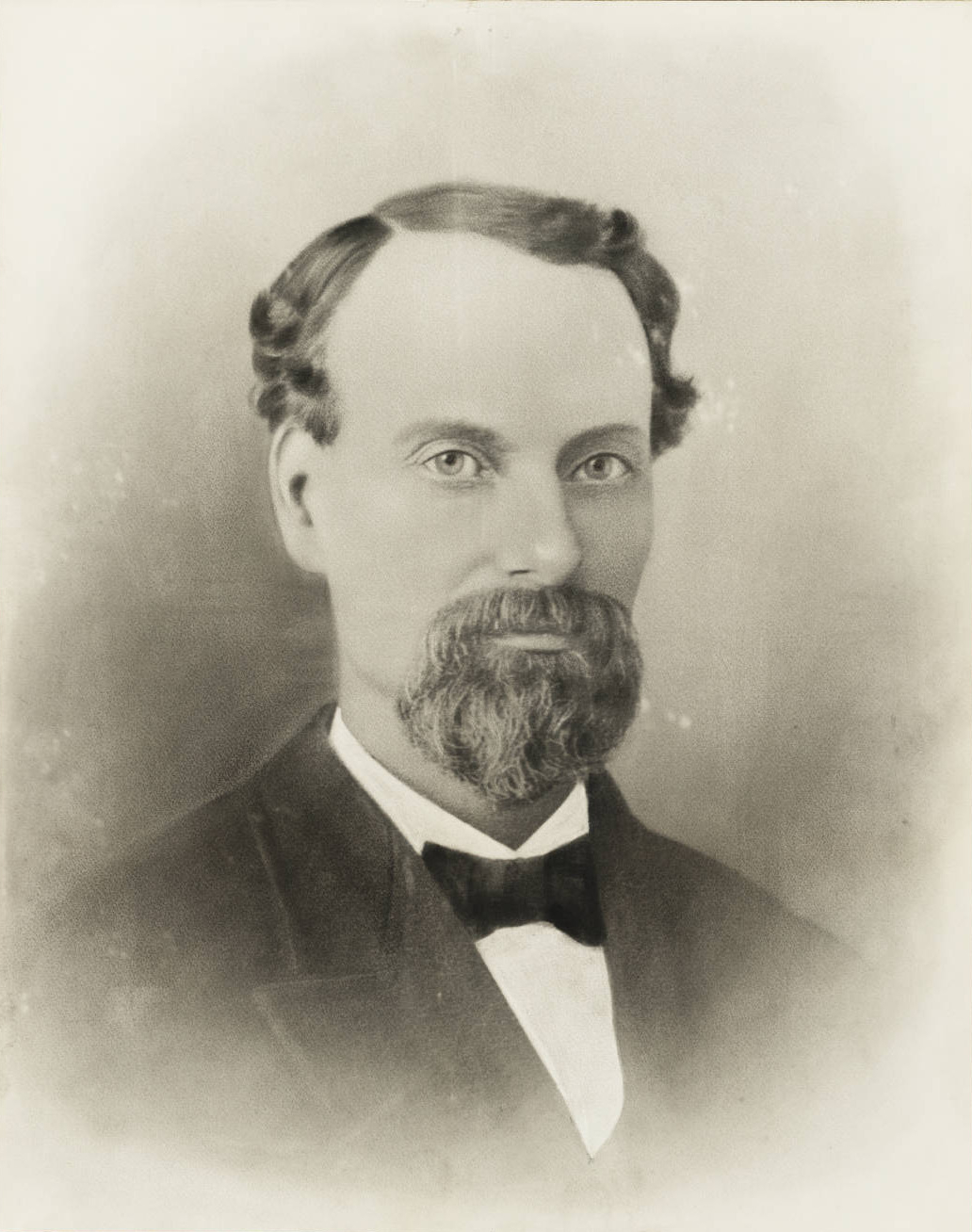
- Harper, circa 1872

9th Mayor of Denver
- In office 1871–1872
- Preceded by: Baxter B. Stiles
- Succeeded by: Joseph E. Bates

Personal details
- Born: 8 March 1825 Glasgow, Scotland
- Died: 31 December 1874 (aged 49) Denver, Colorado
- Children: John Johnston Harper

John Harper (8 March 1825 – 31 December 1874) was an American politician. He served as mayor of Denver, Colorado from 1871 to 1872. He was the owner of a hardware store.
