= J. M. Perkins =

American politician (1863–1926)

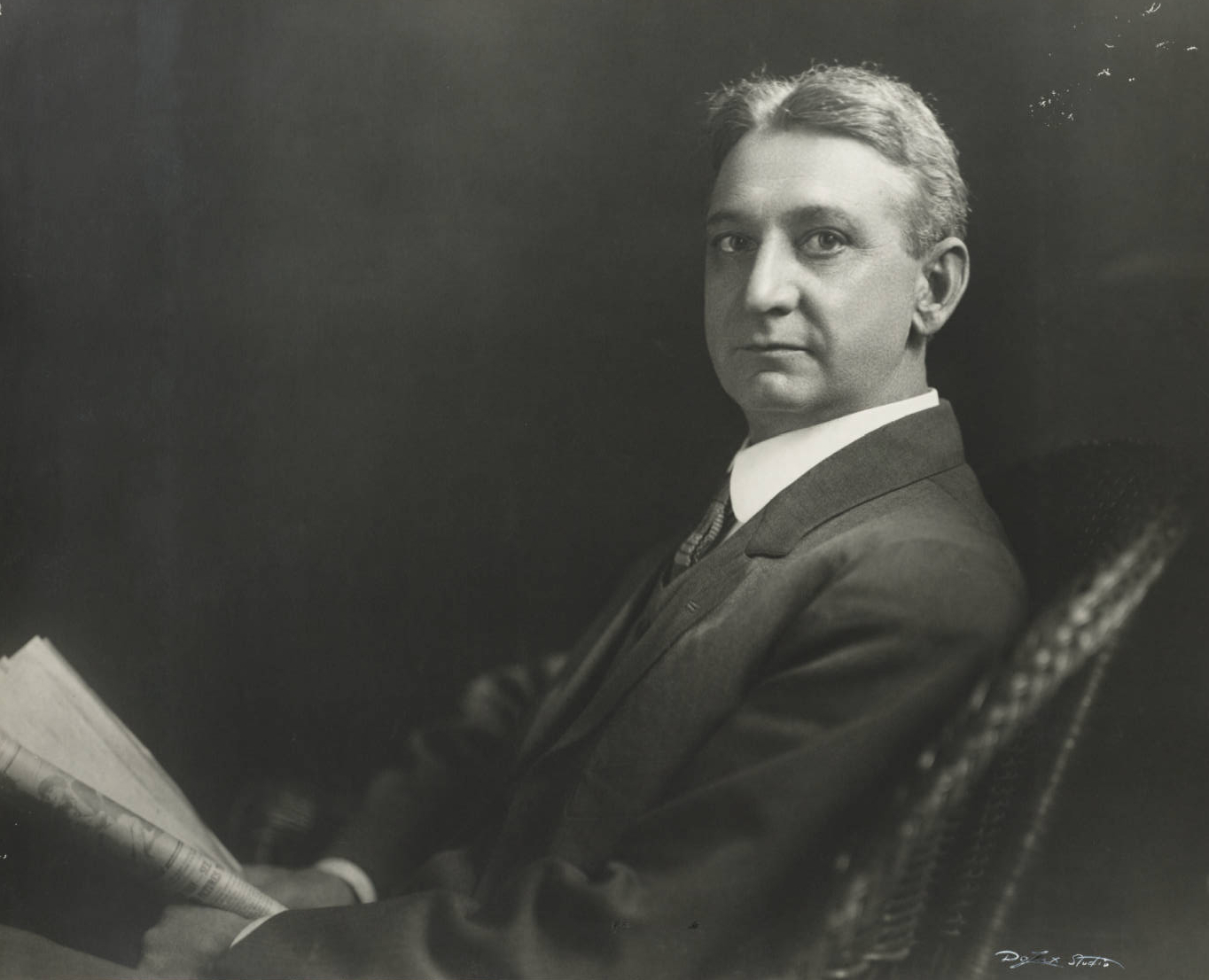
- Perkins, circa 1913

28th Mayor of Denver
- In office 1913–1915
- Preceded by: Henry J. Arnold
- Succeeded by: William H. Sharpley

Personal details
- Born: January 8, 1863 Farmington, Missouri, U.S.
- Died: October 29, 1926 (aged 63) Denver, Colorado, U.S.

James McDaniel Perkins (January 8, 1863 – October 29, 1926) was an American politician who served as the mayor of Denver, Colorado from 1913 to 1915.
