= Francis M. Case =

American politician (1822–1892)

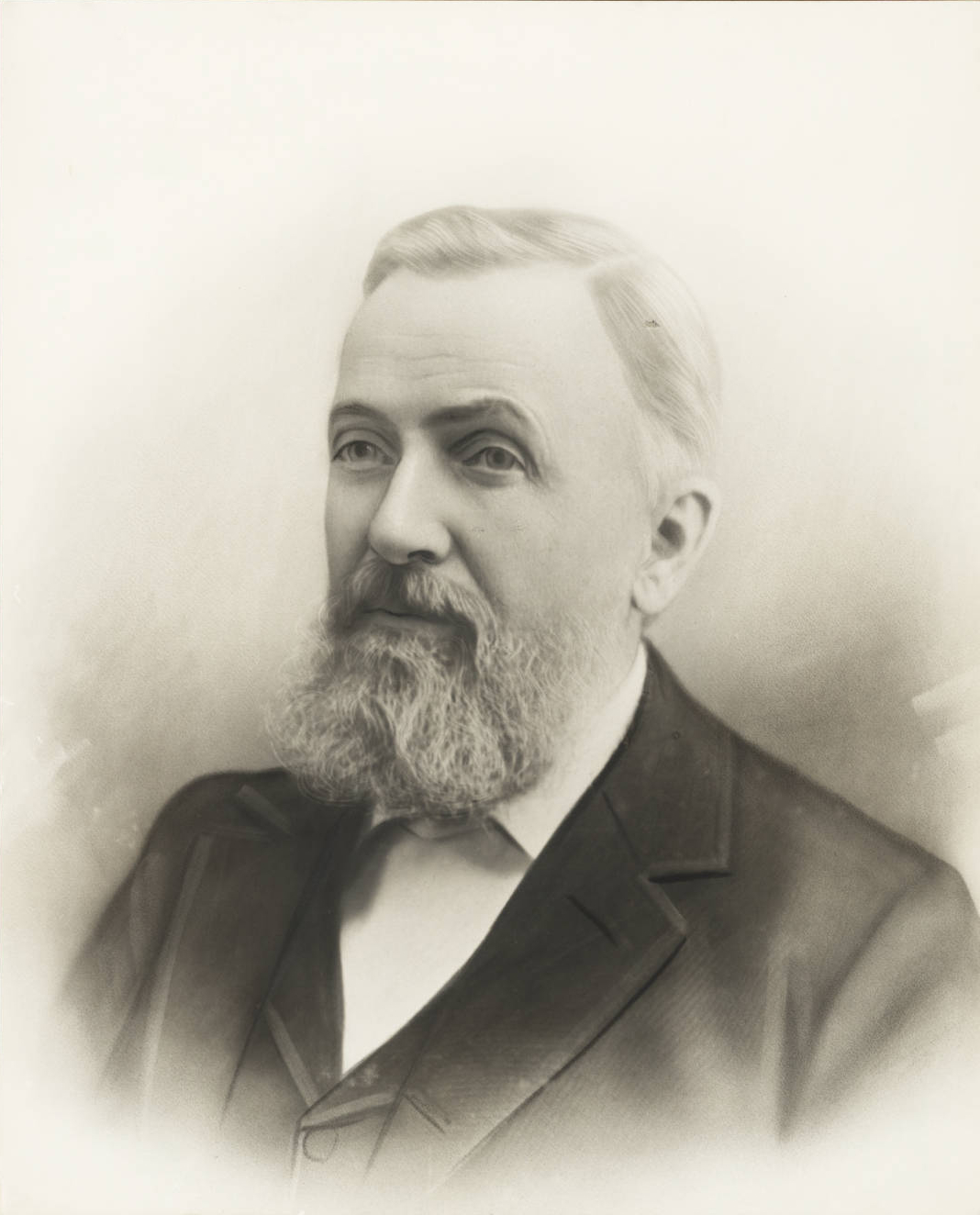
- Case, circa 1873

11th Mayor of Denver
- In office 1873–1874
- Preceded by: Joseph E. Bates
- Succeeded by: William J. Barker

Personal details
- Born: June 22, 1822 Eagleville, Ashtabula County, Ohio, U.S.A
- Died: December 12, 1892 (aged 70) Findlay, Ohio, U.S.

Francis M. Case (1822-1892) was an American politician. In March 1861 he was appointed as the first Surveyor General of Colorado Territory by President Abraham Lincoln, compiling a map of Colorado from surveys and government maps. Then, in 1870, he worked as chief engineer of the Kansas Pacific Railroad. He served as the 11th mayor of Denver, Colorado from 1873 to 1874. He is buried at Denver's Fairmount Cemetery.
