= M. D. Van Horn =

American politician (1837–1895)

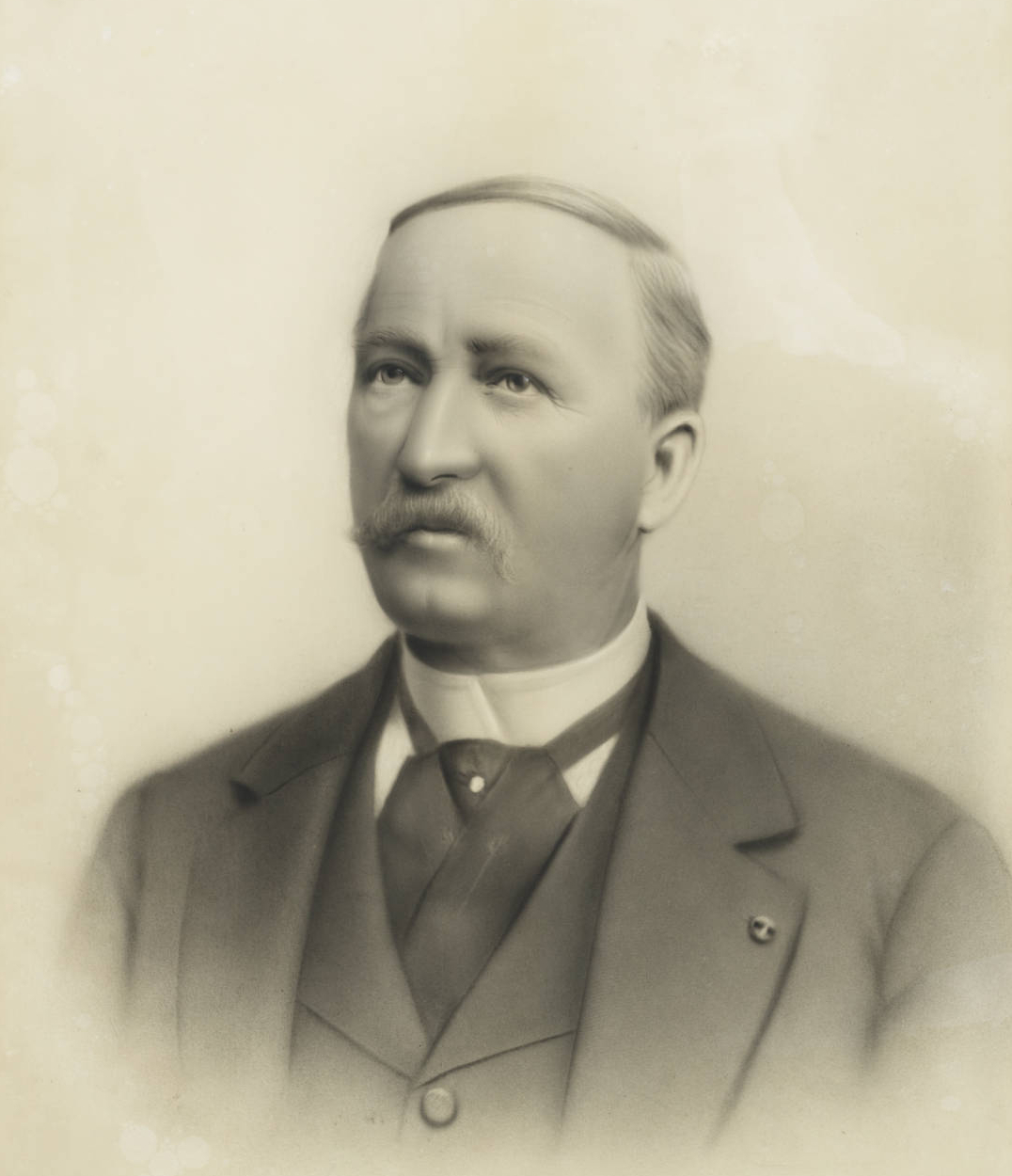
- Van Horn, circa 1894

22nd Mayor of Denver
- In office 1893–1895
- Preceded by: Platt Rogers
- Succeeded by: Thomas S. McMurray

Personal details
- Born: January 12, 1837 Delaware County, Ohio, U.S.
- Died: August 14, 1895 (aged 58) Denver, Colorado, U.S.

Marion DeKalb Van Horn (January 12, 1837 – August 14, 1895) was an American politician who served as the mayor of Denver, Colorado from 1893 to 1895. He died when he fell from a third story window of the Grand Central Hotel of which he was the proprietor.
