= George T. Clark =

American politician (1837–1888)

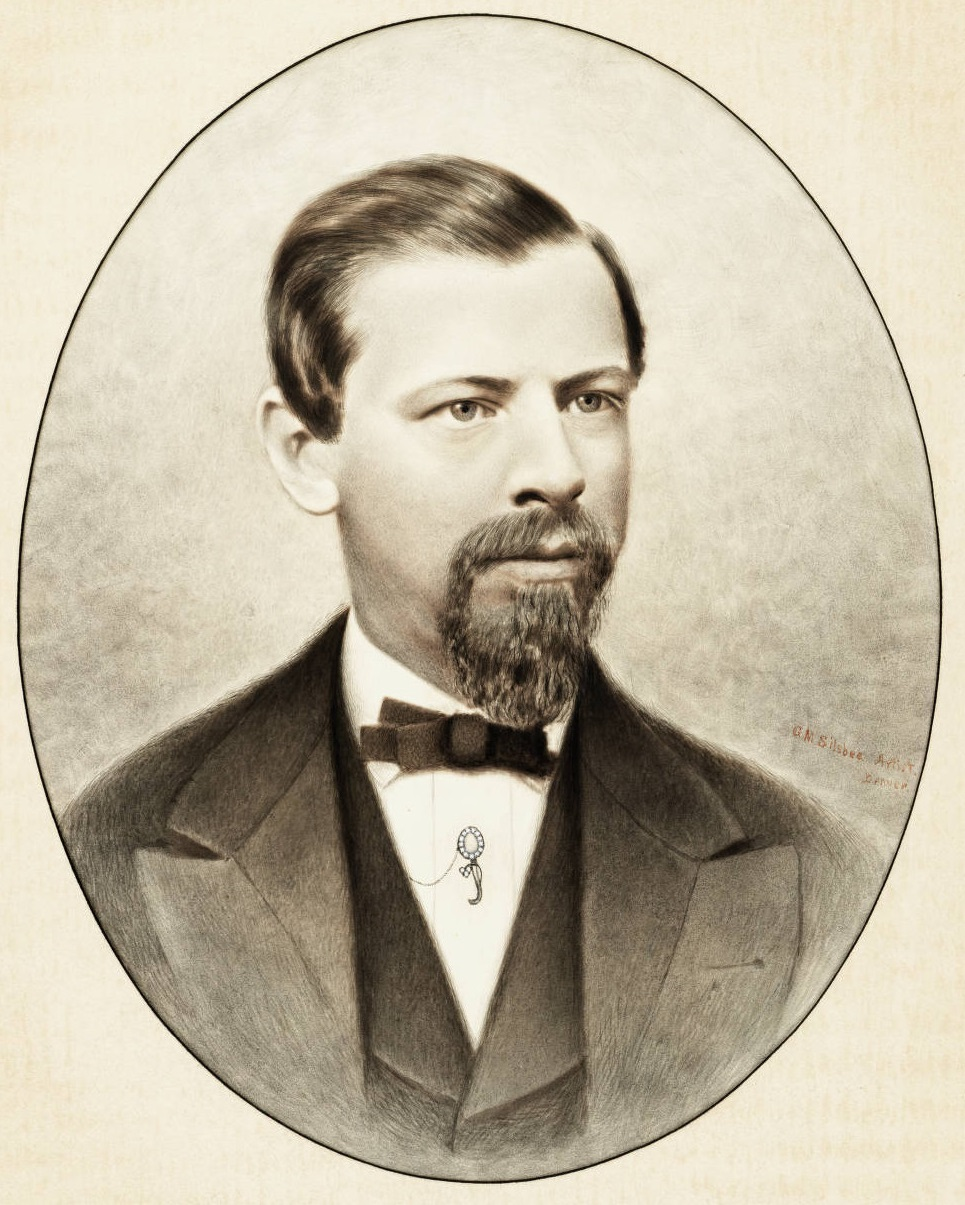

5th Mayor of Denver
- In office 1865–1866
- Preceded by: H. J. Brendlinger
- Succeeded by: Milton DeLano

Personal details
- Born: February 24, 1837 Douglas, Massachusetts, U.S.
- Died: November 6, 1888 (aged 51) Colorado, U.S.

George T. Clark (February 24, 1837 – November 6, 1888) was an American banker and politician.

== Early life ==
Born on February 24, 1837, in Douglas, Massachusetts, and he received a common school education. In 1849, he moved to Wisconsin and he moved to Colorado in the spring of 1860.

== Career ==
=== Business ===
Clark worked as an agent at Western Stage Company and Henchley and Company's Express in Denver until 1861. During his career, he was involved in a number of financial and banking enterprises, including Clark Gruber and Company's Banking House and Mint, a partner at Clark and Company banking house, a founder of the First National Bank of Denver, and he ran the George T. Clark and Company banking house.

=== Politics ===
Governor William Gilpin appointed him treasurer of the Territory of Colorado. In 1863, he was the treasurer of the City of Denver and Arapahoe County. He was a member of the 1864 and 1865 constitutional conventions. He served as mayor of Denver, Colorado from 1865 to 1866. In 1870, he was assistant secretary of the legislative council. Governor Edward M. McCook appointed him Territorial treasurer in 1870, and he was reappointed in 1872. In 1876, he was chosen secretary of the Colorado senate. Clark was a delegate to the 1880 Republican National Convention.

== Personal life ==
He owned the first piano brought into Denver. Clark is buried in Riverside Cemetery in Denver.
