= Robert Morris (Denver mayor) =

Irish-American politician

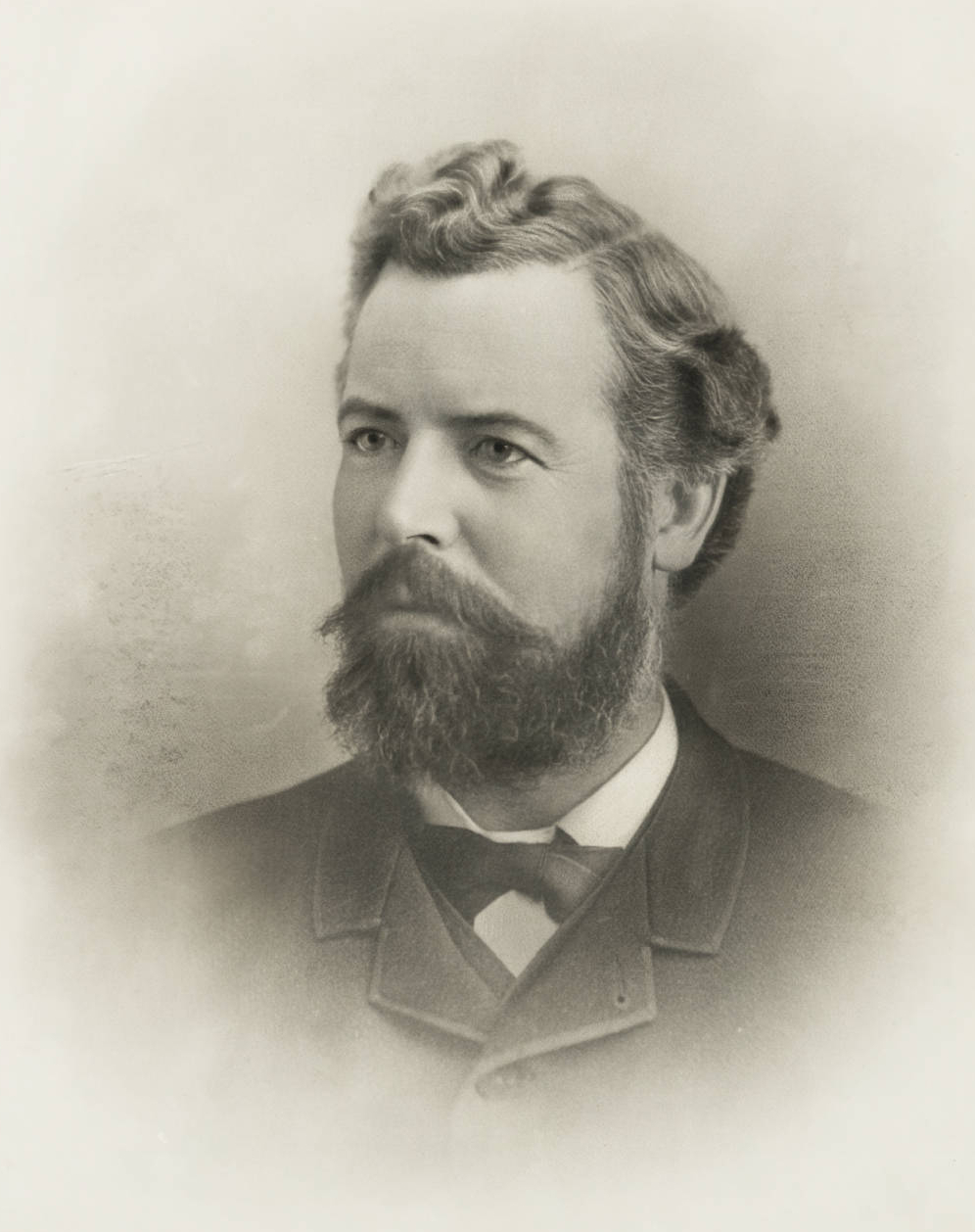
- Morris, circa 1882

16th Mayor of Denver
- In office 1881–1883
- Preceded by: Richard Sopris
- Succeeded by: John Long Routt

Personal details
- Born: 15 July 1838; Athlone, Ireland
- Died: 24 June 1917 (aged 78); Denver, Colorado, U.S.

Robert Morris (15 July 1838 – 24 June 1917) was an Irish-American politician who served as the mayor of Denver, Colorado from 1881 to 1883.
