= Indiana Sopris Cushman =

American educator (1839–1925)

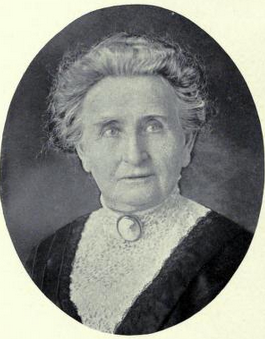
Indiana Sopris Cushman, from a 1914 publication.

Indiana Sopris Cushman (July 12, 1839 – September 25, 1925) was an American educator, credited as the first woman to teach school in Colorado.

== Early life ==
Indiana Sopris was born in Brookville, Indiana, the daughter of Richard Sopris, a canal builder and steamboat captain, and Elizabeth Lloyd Allen Sopris. The Sopris family moved to Colorado in early 1860; her father Richard Sopris became mayor of Denver in 1878. "We found some very pleasant people," Indiana Sopris Cushman later wrote about the Denver she met in 1860. "Not very many families, mostly men, very few young ladies. My sister and I and half a dozen other young ladies were all there were in Denver. Of course we were all belles then."

== Career ==
In May 1860, Indiana Sopris opened a school, becoming the first white woman to teach school in the city. She is credited as the first woman teacher in all of Colorado. She also taught and served as assistant superintendent in the first Sunday School in the city, working with her sister and with Clara Brown. She was one of the twelve charter members of the city's first Congregational Church, with her mother and sister.

She lived in Deadwood, South Dakota from 1878 to 1903, one of the first white women to reside there. She served on the History of Child-Saving Work Committee of the National Conference of Charities and Correction in 1893. She was an honorary president of the Society of Colorado Pioneers, and wrote historical articles about Denver in later life.

== Personal life ==
Indiana Sopris married Samuel Cushman, a mining engineer and editor originally from Massachusetts, in 1866. They had three children, Charlotte, Irene, and George. Both Cushmans were active in the Congregational church in Deadwood, and in school affairs in the town. She was widowed in 1899, when Samuel died. Indiana Sopris Cushman died in Denver in 1925, aged 86 years. She was survived by her daughter Charlotte and by three of her brothers.

Her grandson, Charlotte's son Roger Cushman Clark (1899-1995), was a model for the "Buster Brown" character, drawn by Richard F. Outcault. Sopris, Colorado, a ghost town now under water at Trinidad Lake State Park, was named for her brother Elbridge B. Sopris, an officer in the American Civil War and afterward a mine owner in the area.
