= Richard Sopris =

American politician (1813–1893)

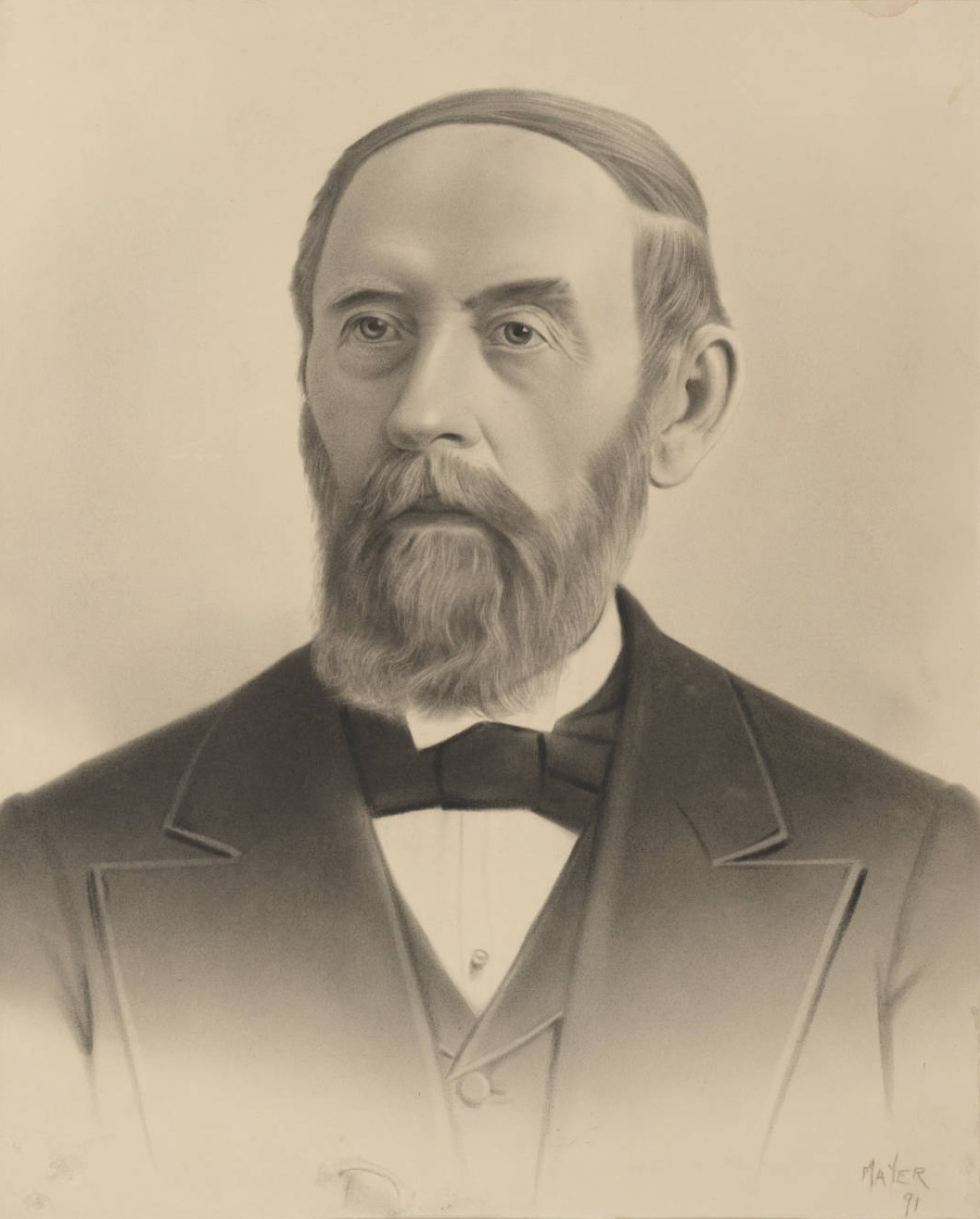
- Sopris, circa 1881

15th Mayor of Denver
- In office 1878–1881
- Preceded by: Baxter B. Stiles
- Succeeded by: Robert Morris

Personal details
- Born: June 26, 1813 Bucks County, Pennsylvania, U.S.
- Died: April 7, 1893 (aged 79) Denver, Colorado, U.S.

Richard Sopris (1813–1893) was an American politician who served as the mayor of Denver, Colorado from 1878 to 1881. Prior to that, he was a prospector, Captain in the 1st Regiment of Colorado Volunteers, and a representative for what is now Colorado in the Kansas Territorial legislature.

== Early and personal life ==
Richard Sopris was born on June 26, 1813 or July 26, 1813 in Bucks County, Pennsylvania. He was married near Philadelphia to Elizabeth Allen of Trenton, New Jersey on June 3, 1836, and they moved to Indiana that year. They had eight children by 1860, and a total of ten children. His daughter, Indiana Sopris opened a school in May 1860. She was the first white woman to teach school in the city and she is credited as the first woman teacher in Colorado.

== Career ==
He began working as a house carpenter. Sopris was also a canal builder and steamboat captain.

In 1858, he traveled by stage to Omaha, Nebraska and then traveled across the plains in a one-horse wagon with George H. Bryant arriving in February or March 1859 in Arapahoe County of Kansas Territory, which would become the Colorado Territory. He was one of the original shareholders of the town of Auraria and prospected for gold in the winter and spring. Sopris was one of the trustees for a Presbyterian church established at Pollock House. Services began June 15, 1859.

He began mining at the Gregory and Bates lode in April 1859. He was President of the Gregory Association of Miners and a member of the Mammoth Quartz Lead Mining Company. He built the first house there considered to be worthy of a family at Mountain City, later called Central City. It was located on High Street. Mountain City Lodge A.F. & A.M was established in 1859, and Sopris was Worshipful Master. He also lived in Auraria and was Worshipful Master of the Auraria Lodge.

In 1860, he traveled back to Michigan City, Indiana and returned to Colorado with his family via train to Atchison, Kansas and then by covered wagon. They lived on the 1300 block of Stout Street. He helped organize the 1st Regiment of Colorado Volunteers. He fought Native Americans at Glorieta Pass in north-central New Mexico and Confederate forces in New Mexico and Arizona. He attained the rank of captain of Company C of the regiment.

He represented Colorado in the Kansas territorial legislature and helped draft mining laws. He was elected mayor of Denver. Richard Sopris died on April 7, 1893, and was buried at the Riverside Cemetery in Denver. His wife died on December 18, 1911. He is the namesake of Mount Sopris, having surveyed the area in 1860.
