= Baxter B. Stiles =

American politician (1824–1889)

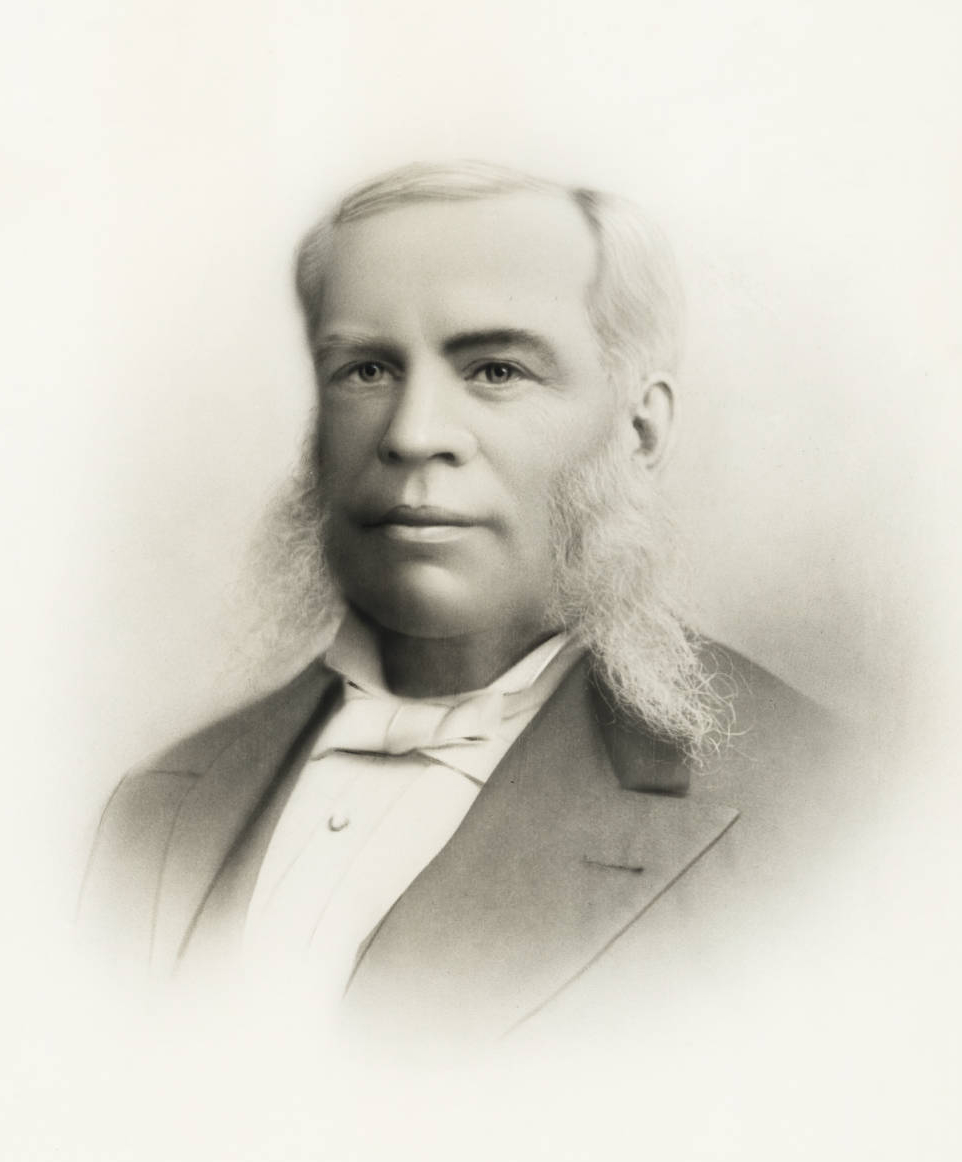
- Stiles, circa 1871

8th and 14th Mayor of Denver
- In office 1877–1878
- Preceded by: R. G. Buckingham
- Succeeded by: Richard Sopris
- In office 1869–1871
- Preceded by: William M. Clayton
- Succeeded by: John Harper

Personal details
- Born: June 26, 1824 Newbury, Vermont, US
- Died: September 30, 1889 (aged 65) Denver, Colorado, US

Baxter B. Stiles (June 26, 1824 - September 30, 1889) was an American politician. He served as mayor of Denver, Colorado from 1869 to 1871, and again from 1877 to 1878.
