= Platt Rogers =

American politician (1850–1928)

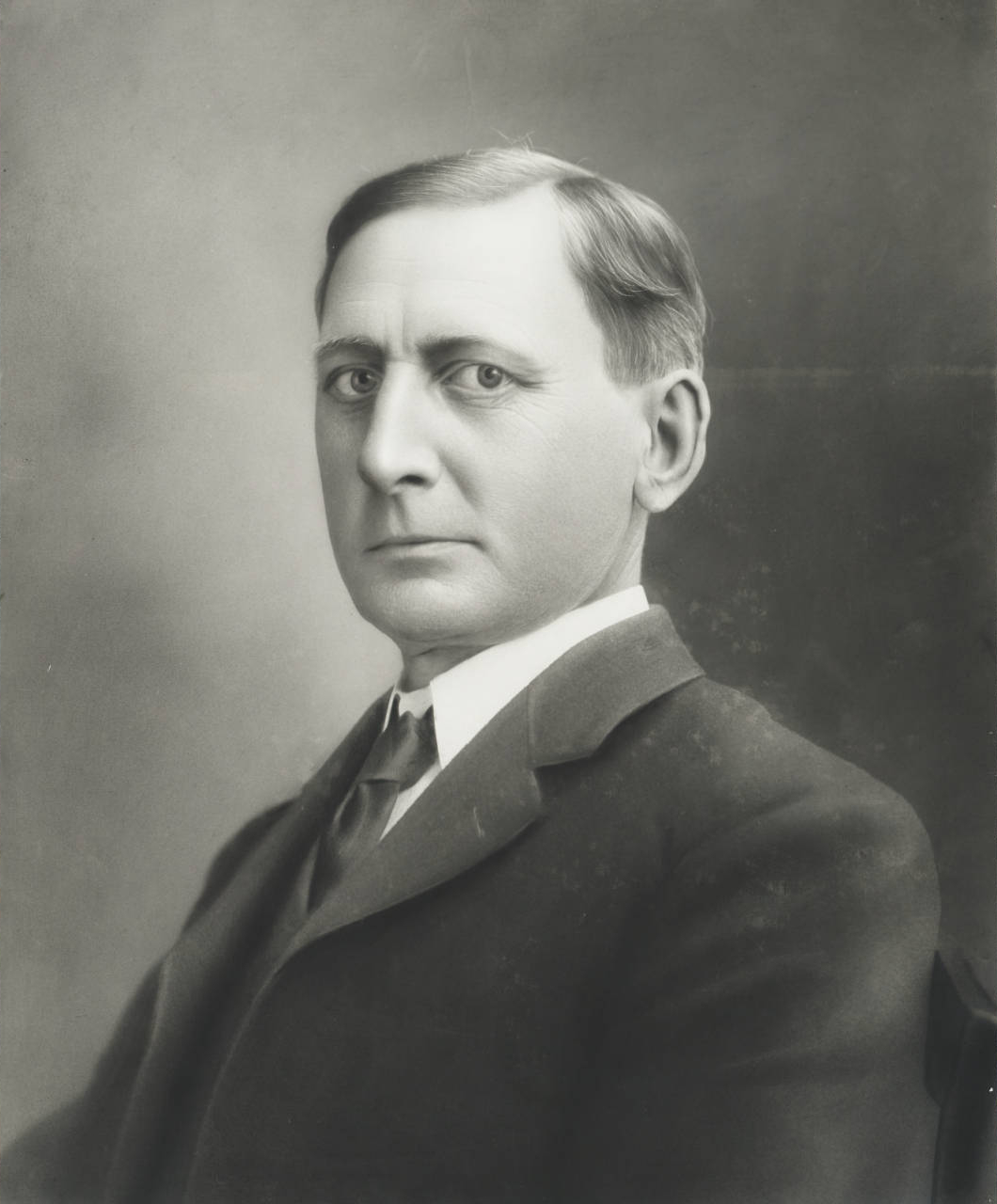
- Rogers, circa 1892

21st Mayor of Denver
- In office 1891–1893
- Preceded by: Wolfe Londoner
- Succeeded by: M. D. Van Horn

Personal details
- Born: 1850; Newton, Massachusetts, U.S.
- Died: December 25, 1928; Denver, Colorado, U.S.

Platt Rogers (1850 – December 25, 1928) was an American politician who served as the mayor of Denver, Colorado from 1891 to 1893.

== Life ==
He was born in 1850 in Newton, New Jersey, shortly thereafter moving along with his family to New York City. He later graduated from Columbia University in 1873, before moving west with his family, while passing through Greeley, Colorado he was so impressed with the town he decided he would remain in the state. He became a practicing attorney, specializing in Irrigation Law. In 1884 litigation arose regarding the High Line Canal and he was called to Denver to represent the English group who constructed it.

He served as a District Court Judge in Colorado's Second Judicial District (Denver) from 1882 to 1887. From 1891 to 1893 he served as Mayor of Denver, during this time he became known as the Iron Handed Mayor, due to his strict enforcement of the law. Unfortunately his time in office became tarred by the disastrous redevelopment of the disused City Cemetery (now Cheesman Park). Problems arose when an unscrupulous undertaker, contracted by the City of Denver to remove the long buried corpses and relocate them to another more suitable site, was discovered to be stuffing adult corpses into child sized coffins and other nefarious activities. Due to much media pressure Mayor Rogers then canceled the contract and instigated an investigation into the work.

He continued to live in Denver until his death on 25 December 1928, when after years of ill health a severe cold developed into a fatal bout of pneumonia. He was survived by his wife and two daughters.
