= Thomas S. McMurray =

American politician (1855–1918)

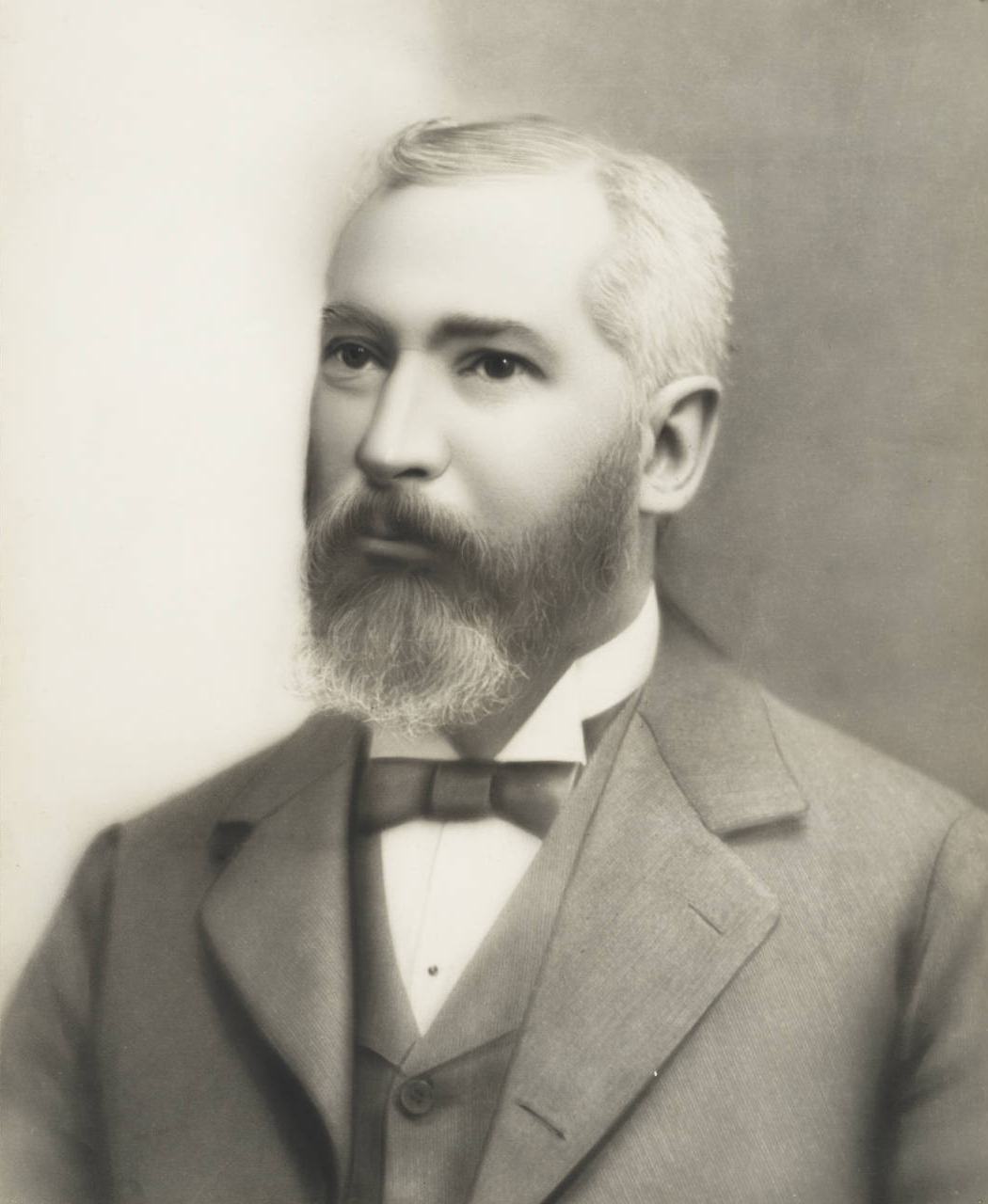
- McMurry, circa 1897

23rd Mayor of Denver
- In office 1895–1899
- Preceded by: M. D. Van Horn
- Succeeded by: Henry V. Johnson

Personal details
- Born: 1855 Philadelphia, Pennsylvania, U.S.
- Died: 1918 (aged 62–63) Denver, Colorado, U.S.

Thomas S. McMurray (1855–1918) was an American politician who served as the mayor of Denver, Colorado from 1895 to 1899. A lawyer by trade, McMurray came to Denver in 1885.

== Mayor of Denver ==
In 1893 Denver received a new municipal charter by the state legislature that decentralized much of the mayor's powers into six different administrative departments, two of which were elected, two appointed by the mayor, and the remaining two appointed by the governor. Clyde Lyndon King, in his doctoral thesis writes "The plan gave the maximum of opportunity for [political] party groups and corporate control." The municipal board members appointed by the governor had complete financial control over the police, fire, and excise departments. Over half the expenditures of the city went through this board which gave the governor and his party much direct control over Denver. That the governor, elected by the entire state, had so much power over the workings of Denver was not lost on the citizens of the city.

One of the other key issues leading up to the Denver mayoral election of 1895 was Denver Tramway's monopoly over the public transportation in the city. In 1885 Denver Tramway had revised its charter so that it was no longer required to add extensions or provide better service, but while there was competition it still did so. In 1893 it merged with the only other public transportation firm in the city and came into a monopoly. Resentment began to grow as the city took actions which favorably impacted Denver Tramway but received no financial compensation in return.

In 1895, Thomas McMurray ran for mayor of Denver on a political platform of "divorcing the city's government from the city's public-service corporations." Previous to this election, Denver had always voted for straight Democrat or Republican tickets. McMurray was the first non-partisan mayor elected in Denver's history. Denver Tramway offered the city a token sum of $50,000 but McMurray vetoed this offering, wanting instead a small percentage of the company's yearly profits.

Another issue in the 1895 election involved the water utilities. Leading up to the election some of the local water utilities had gone bankrupt and a new public-service corporation was created, the Denver Union Water Company, which acquired the previous nine independent utilities. In the election the citizens of Denver were asked whether they wanted to stay with this new corporation or build a new municipal water utility. Denver Union Water promised to abide by all previous charters and a new city council was elected that was evenly divided between the two options. However, after the election Denver Union Water said that conflicting clauses in the different charters made it impractical to implement its previous rates and offered a solution that it said would ultimately reduce rates. A court injunction demanded that the water company fix its rates as laid out in its contract, but the company continued to use its own solution.

The issue of water bill rates was the single largest concern in the election of 1897. Many water users refused to pay their water bills and McMurray was re-elected "with the help of the Civic Federation and the vote of the women." More court injunctions were issued, ordinances were passed, and fines were assessed but Denver Union Water ignored all of them. In a case brought by McMurray before the District Court of Arapahoe County, the court sided with the water company and found that conflicting clauses were impractical to implement and allowed the water company to increase its rates. McMurray continued to pressure the company to lower its rates, but had no power to force it to do so.

In 1899 the public corporations were determined to defeat McMurray and campaigned against him. King notes, "In the [1899 mayoral] campaign certain members of the Democratic party, motivated and financed by the city's public service corporations, organized the 'big mitt,' the famous ballot-box stuffing brigade. By many it is charged and believed that McMurray's defeat was due solely to ballot-box stuffing." McMurray lost the election and his successor, Henry V. Johnson, who had agreed on the campaign trail about divorcing the city's government and corporations, accepted Denver Tramway's revised one-time payment of $72,000. With McMurray's defeat the public-service corporations did not see a significant challenge to their power for another decade.
