= Milton DeLano =

American politician

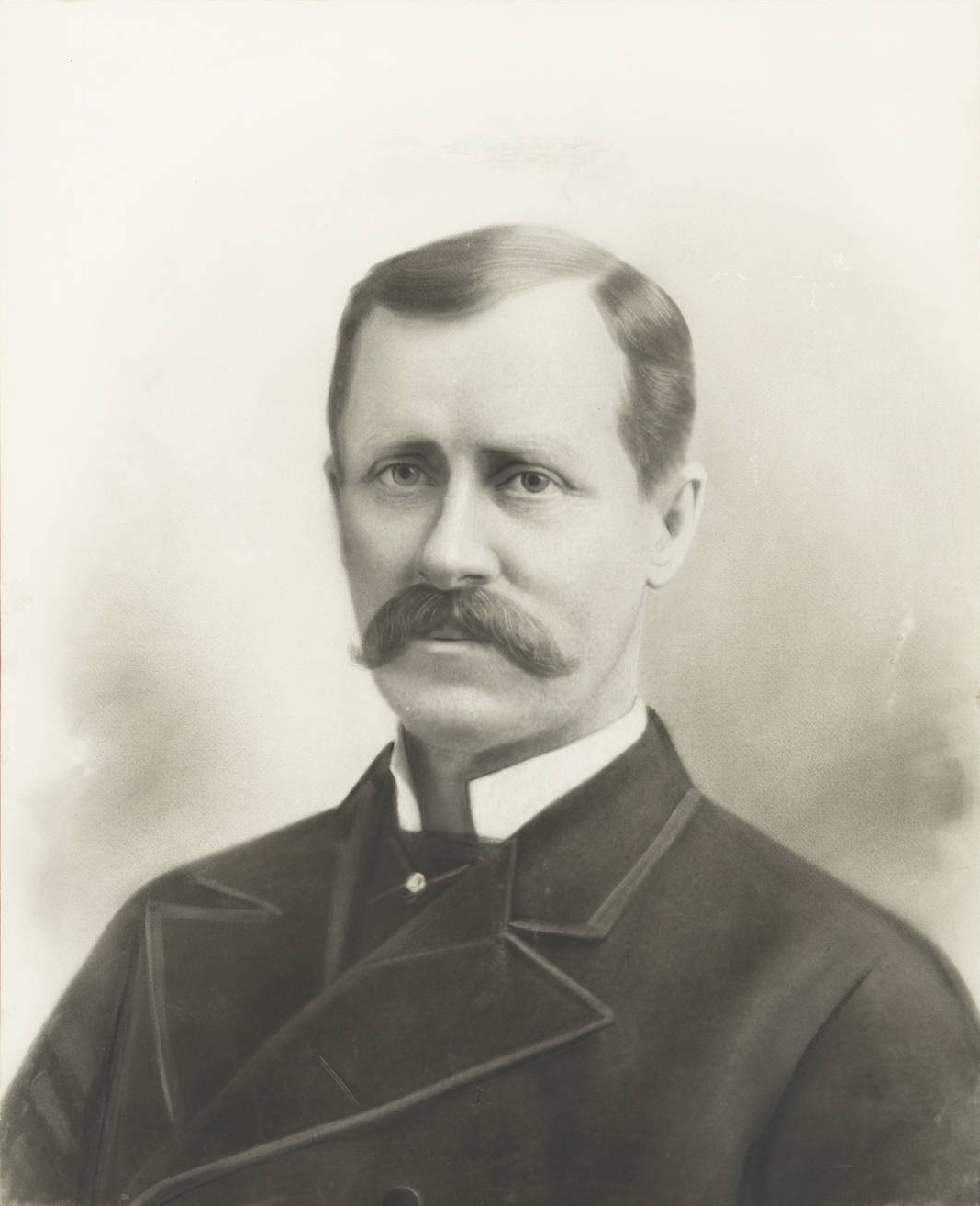
- DeLano, circa 1867

6th Mayor of Denver
- In office 1866–1868
- Preceded by: George T. Clark
- Succeeded by: William M. Clayton

Personal details
- Born: December 17, 1827; Allegheny County, New York, U.S.
- Died: June 24, 1894 (aged 66)

Milton M. DeLano (December 17, 1827 – June 24, 1894) was an American politician. He served as mayor of Denver, Colorado from 1866 to 1868. He was born in Allegany County, New York.
