= R. G. Buckingham =

American politician (1816–1889)

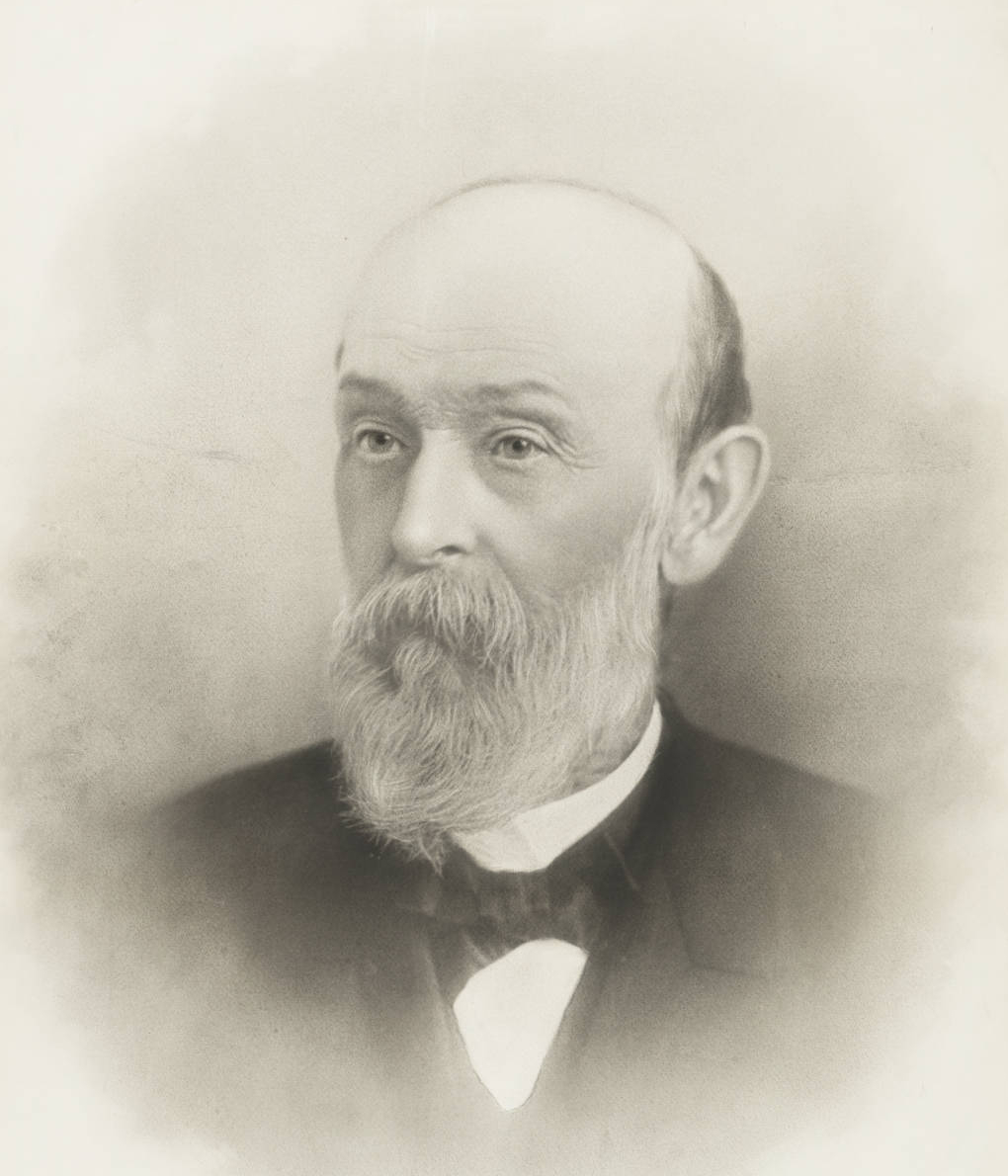
- Buckingham, circa 1876

13th Mayor of Denver
- In office 1876–1877
- Preceded by: William J. Barker
- Succeeded by: Baxter B. Stiles

Personal details
- Born: September 14, 1816 Troy, New York, U.S.
- Died: March 20, 1889 (aged 72) Los Angeles, California, U.S.

Richard G. Buckingham (September 14, 1816 – March 20, 1889) was an American politician who served as the mayor of Denver, Colorado, from 1876 to 1877.

Buckingham attended Berkshire Medical College in Pittsfield, Massachusetts, and received his MD in 1836. He operated a private practice in Lexington, Missouri, for 21 years and then moved the practice to Denver, Colorado.

He was one of the founders of the Denver Medical Association in 1871. The same year, the Colorado Territorial Medical Society was founded and Buckingham was its first president. He advocated for the creation of what was originally named the Colorado Institute for the Education of Mutes.

Buckingham was nominated for governor under the Greenback Party in 1878, but was defeated by Frederick W. Pitkin.

Party political offices
First	Greenback nominee for Governor of Colorado; 1878	Succeeded by A. J. Chittenden
