= Amos Steck =

American politician (1822–1908)

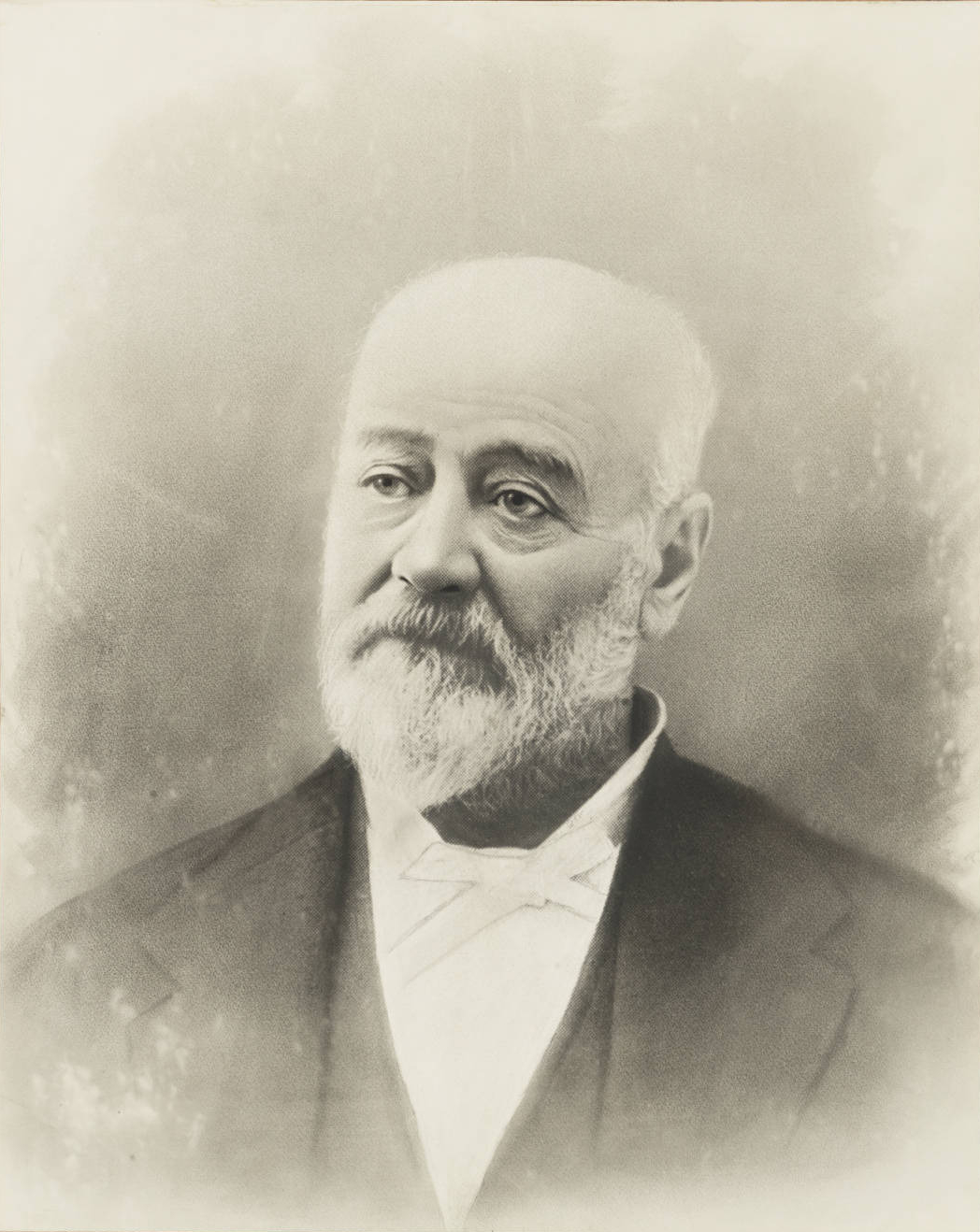
- Steck, circa 1864

3rd Mayor of Denver
- In office 1863–1864
- Preceded by: Charles A. Cook
- Succeeded by: Hiram J. Brendlinger

Personal details
- Born: January 8, 1822 Lancaster, Ohio, U.S
- Died: November 17, 1908 (aged 86) Denver, Colorado, U.S.

Amos Steck (January 8, 1822 – November 17, 1908) was an American lawyer and politician. He served as Postmaster in 1859, then mayor of Denver, Colorado from 1863 to 1864. He also was School Board president, and elected to the state legislature. He died in 1908. Amos Steck Elementary School is named after him.
