= Robert R. Wright =

American politician and businessman (1844–?)

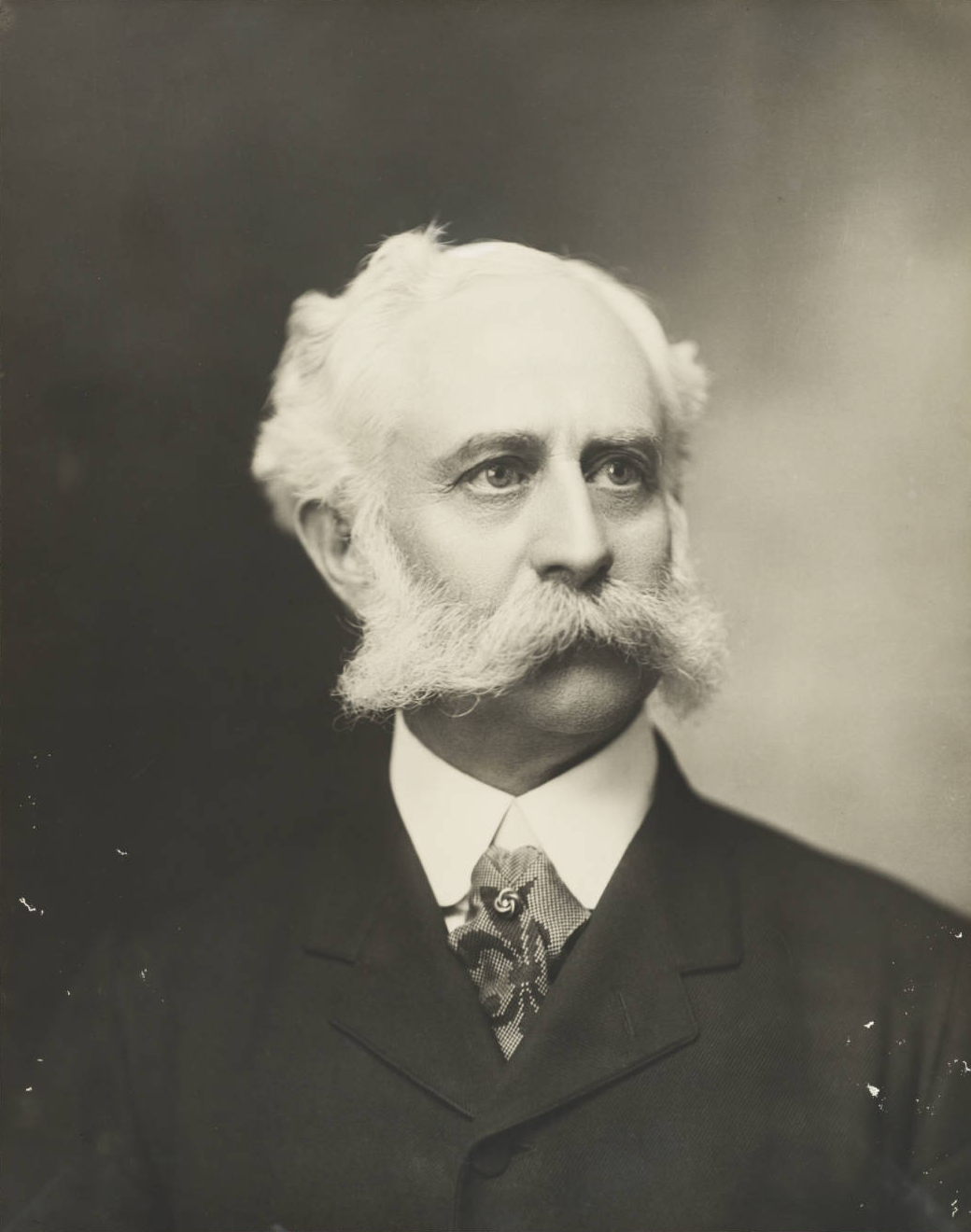
- Wright, c. 1900

25th Mayor of Denver
- In office 1901 – 1904
- Preceded by: Henry V. Johnson
- Succeeded by: Robert W. Speer

Personal details
- Born: Robert Russell Wright Jr. August 16, 1844 Wilbraham, Massachusetts, US
- Party: Republican
- Occupation: Politician, businessman

Military service
- Allegiance: United States
- Branch/service: Union army
- Years of service: 1864–1865
- Unit: 8th Massachusetts Militia Regiment
- Battles/wars: American Civil War

Robert Russell Wright Jr. (August 16, 1844 – ?) was an American politician and businessman. A Republican, he was the Mayor of Denver from 1901 to 1904.

== Early life ==
Wright was born on August 16, 1844, in Wilbraham, Massachusetts, the son of merchant Robert Russell Wright Sr. At age 12, he enrolled at Wilbraham Wesleyan Academy, studying there until 1861.

== Career ==
Wright clerked for a bookstore in Springfield until spring 1864, leaving to fight in the American Civil War as a member of the 8th Massachusetts Militia Regiment. After the war, he returned to his clerk job. In 1868, he worked as a merchant under his father in Wilbraham. He was the town's clerk and treasurer in 1870.

In 1872, Wright moved to Colorado. In summer of that year, he, alongside a few business partners, converted a ranch 20 miles east of Denver for sheep farming. They purchased sheep from New Mexico that winter, and in spring 1873, brought the sheep to the ranch, after which point Wright left the ranch to be maintained by his partners. In 1878, he was secretary of the Colorado Sheep Growers' Association.

From then until 1880, Wright clerked for fashion design companies. In 1880, he sold his sheep business and founded Skinner Bros. & Wright, a clothing company, alongside D. T. and George W. Skinner. In May of that year, he fell off his horse and was bed-ridden for two months. He In 1898, he left the company.

Wright was a Republican. He was Mayor of Denver from 1901 to 1904. In 1903, Wright v. Morgan was argued before the Supreme Court of the United States, over a land dispute between the city of Denver and Ellen Teresa Morgan. Denver won, with the land being used for a cemetery.

Wright's daughter, Roberta Wright, was a sponsor for the USS Denver.
