= Henry V. Johnson =

American lawyer and politician (1852–1931)

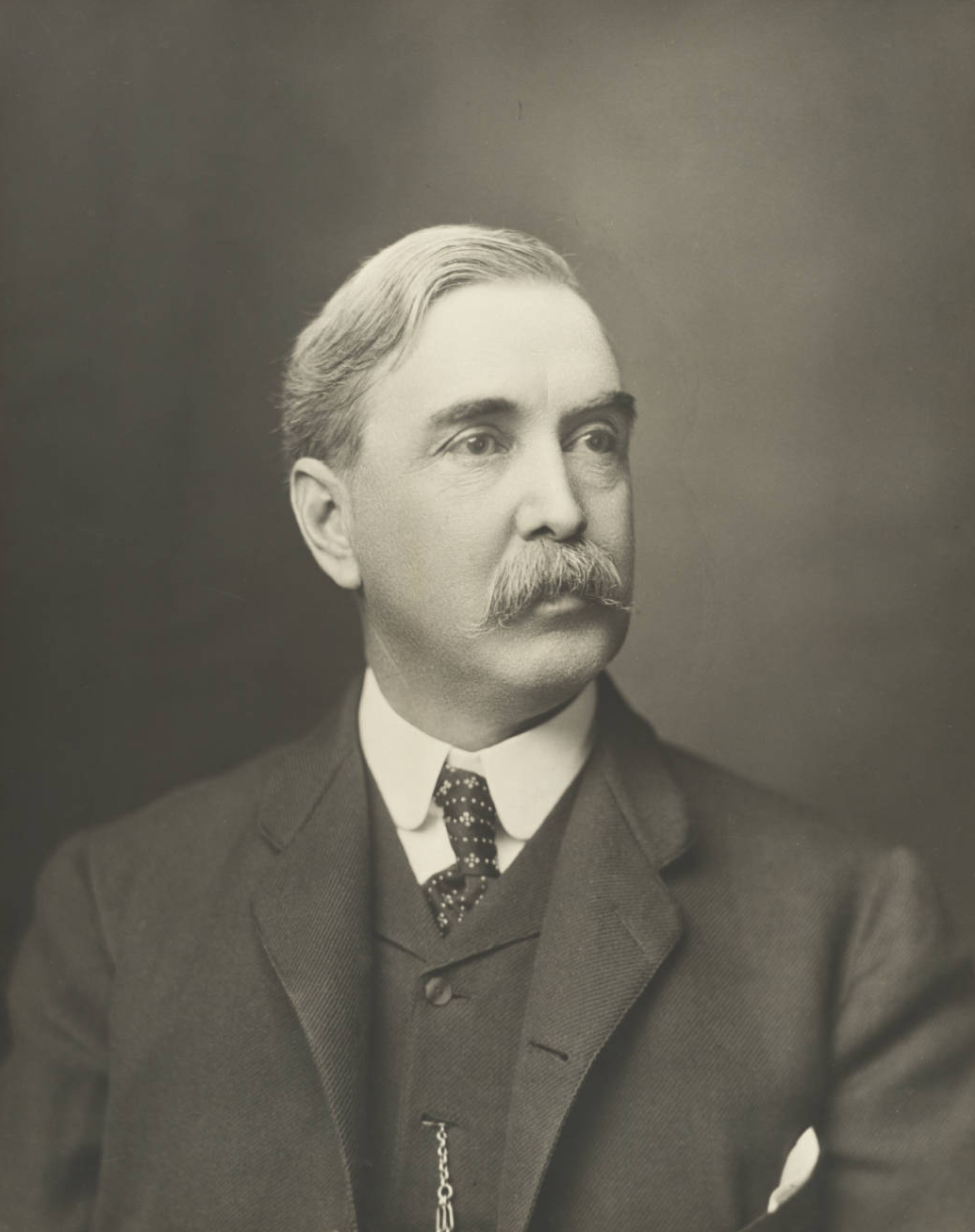
- Johnson, circa 1900

24th Mayor of Denver
- In office 1899–1901
- Preceded by: Thomas S. McMurray
- Succeeded by: Robert R. Wright

Personal details
- Born: August 6, 1852 Georgetown, Kentucky, U.S. (Note: An online image shows that his gravestone in Denver's Fairmount Cemetery reads "Henry Viley Johnson / Born Georgetown Kentucky – 1852 / Died Denver Colorado – 1931 / Mayor of Denver 1900".)
- Died: June 29, 1931 (aged 78) Denver, Colorado, U.S.
- Party: Democratic
- Education: Georgetown College, University of Kentucky
- Occupation: Lawyer

Henry Viley Johnson (August 6, 1852 – June 29, 1931) was an American lawyer and politician who served as the Mayor of Denver from 1899 to 1901.

== Biography ==
Johnson was born in Scott County, Kentucky, in 1852 and earned degrees from Georgetown College and the University of Kentucky. He moved to Denver in 1886 and worked as a lawyer.

Johnson was the United States Attorney for the District of Colorado from 1893 to 1897, and later served as the Mayor of Denver from April 1899 to April 1901.

Johnson was married and had four children;

- Junius W. Johnson (1878–1933), a civil engineer
- Henry "Harry" V. Johnson (1881–1966), a physician
- Margaret Johnson Harrison (1893–1987)
- Tom Loftin Johnson (1900–1963), a noted artist

Johnson, who was a cousin of Tom L. Johnson, Mayor of Cleveland, died in Denver in 1931 after contracting pneumonia.
