= W. F. R. Mills =

American politician and businessman (1856–1941)

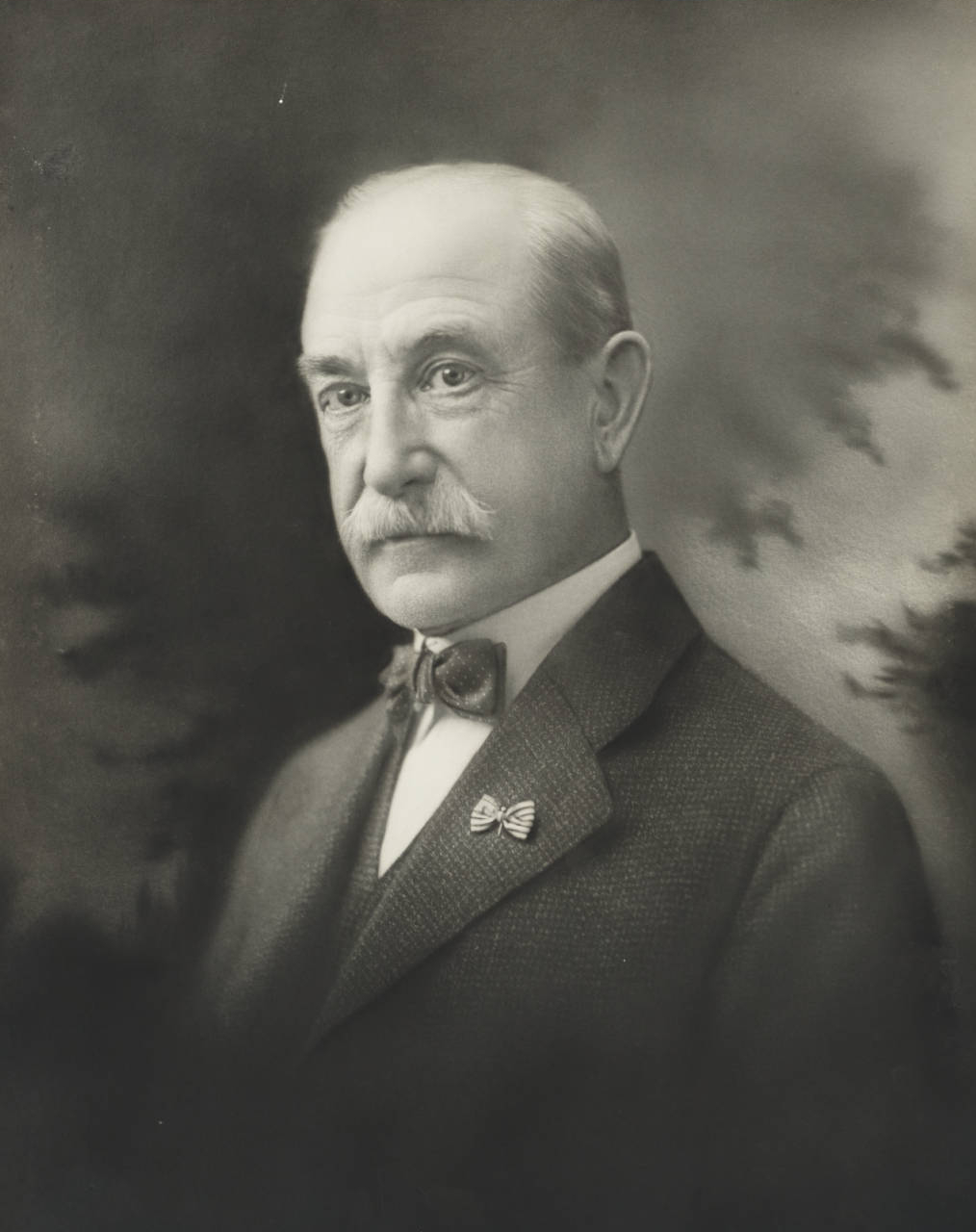
- Mills, c. 1918

31st Mayor of Denver
- In office May 18, 1918 – June 1, 1919
- Preceded by: Robert W. Speer
- Succeeded by: Dewey C. Bailey

Personal details
- Born: William Fitz Randolph Mills; September 8, 1856 New York City, US
- Died: November 16, 1941 (aged 85) Denver, Colorado, US
- Party: Republican
- Occupation: Politician, businessman

Military service
- Branch/service: New York State Division of Military and Naval Affairs
- Years of service: 1877–1887
- Rank: First sergeant
- Unit: 22nd New York National Guard

William Fitz Randolph Mills (September 8, 1856 – November 16, 1941) was an American politician and businessman. A Republican, he was the Mayor of Denver in 1918 and 1919.

Born in New York City, Mills received a limited education and moved about the United States working odd jobs. He eventually entered the insurance business and moved to Denver. There, he was a member of its Chamber of Commerce. He succeeded Robert W. Speer as Mayor after his death, completing his unexpired term. He was also active in science organizations.

== Early life ==
Mills was born on September 8, 1856, in New York City, the second of four children born to carpenter James Bishop Mills – who died when he was ten – and Sarah Martin (née Crowell) Mills. He was of French and English descent. His family previously used the lengthened surname of Millais. He partially completed his education at the New York City public schools.

== Career ==
=== Early career ===
From July 1867 to January 1868, Mills lived in Julesburg, Colorado. He then moved to Cheyenne, Wyoming, working as a messenger for Western Union for eight months there. Afterward, he became a telegraph operator for the company, also for eight months.

Mills caught Colorado tick fever and recovered in Chicago. He then worked for a mill, and after three weeks of work, earned $3. This was so little that his mother sent him $50, which he used to move to Muskegon, Michigan. There, he was a nighttime telegraph operator for Western Union for two years. He also studied.

In 1872, Mills again fell ill and returned to New York City. For a year, he sold food from a wagon. According to one source, he joined the Irving Fire Insurance Company in 1872. From 1881 to 1887, he was secretary of the Irving Fire Insurance Company, and in 1887 and 1888, was secretary of the Mutual Fire Insurance Company.

From 1877 to 1887, Mills served in the New York State Division of Military and Naval Affairs, a member of Company B of the 22nd Regiment, enlisting as a private and rising to the rank of first sergeant and joining the colonel's staff. One source claims he served until 1882.

=== Denver and politics ===
In 1888, Mills moved to Kearney, Nebraska, where he worked as vice-president and manager of the Hamilton Loan & Trust Company. As a representative of the company, he moved to Denver in 1892 and headed the Denver Loan & Trust Company, continuing to work as such until the Panic of 1893. He then became a broker for entities in the Eastern United States, working as such until 1901. He also worked in the insurance business there.

Mills in a 1908 newspaper, while secretary of the Denver Chamber of Commerce

In 1900, Mills purchased the Mining Reporter, which he published until December 1907; it was treated as an authority on mining. He was a relief worker in the aftermath of the 1906 San Francisco earthquake. From 1906 to 1909, he was director of the American Mining Congress. In 1908, he was a founding member of the Denver Convention League, serving as its secretary until its disorganization in 1909. He was a director of the Denver Chamber of Commerce, serving as its vice-president in 1906 and 1907 and being elected its secretary in 1908. He was also secretary and manager of the Semper Land Company.

Mills was a Stalwart Republican, though attended the 1908 Democratic National Convention. From May 17, 1916 to May 1918, he was head of the Denver Department of Improvements and Parks (also the ex officio Deputy Mayor). His salary in as head of the Department was $4,000 per year.

Mills became Mayor of Denver upon the death of his predecessor, Robert W. Speer, on May 14, 1918; he was sworn in on May 18. He had been acting Mayor while Speer suffered from illness. He served until June 1, 1919, at the election and inauguration of his successor; he did not run in the following election. His salary as Mayor was $6,000 per year.

Mills continued the efforts of Speer during his own term. His first act was appointing James A. Burnett, a member of the Denver City Council, as his successor to the Department of Improvements and Parks. While serging, the Denver Water Department was formed. On August 3, 1918, City Park had segregation signs installed by an unknown individual, which was reversed the same day by he and city attorney James Marsh. During World War I, members of the National Guard from Fort Logan were stationed in Denver – the first military presence in Denver in its history – to cooperate with police, as much of the force was drafted to fight. Amid the Spanish flu, he banned indoor gatherings in the city.

From 1919 to 1923, Mills was manager of the Denver Water Department. In 1919, he joined the Western Steam Laundry Company (later the City Elite Laundry Company). During World War I, he elected secretary of the Denver Community Chest. He was vice-president of the Denver Federated Charities, and was president of the Denver Tourists Bureau.

Mills was also interested in science. For a time, he was director of the Western Association of Technical Chemists and Metallurgists. He worked for the National and Colorado Forestry Associations for some time, and from 1907, worked for the Rocky Mountain Highway Association. He was also a member of the American Association for the Advancement of Science, the Colorado Scientific Society, and the National Geographic Society.

== Personal life and death ==
On January 25, 1881, Mills married Corwina Rouse (died 1920), with whom he had eight children, four of them dying in infancy. He was a member of the Universalist Church of America. He was a member of the Freemasons and several Masonic bodies. He died on November 16, 1941, aged 85, in Denver, from a myocardial infarction. His Victorian house, built 1886, later became a Denver landmark.
