= Hiram J. Brendlinger =

American politician (1825–1894)

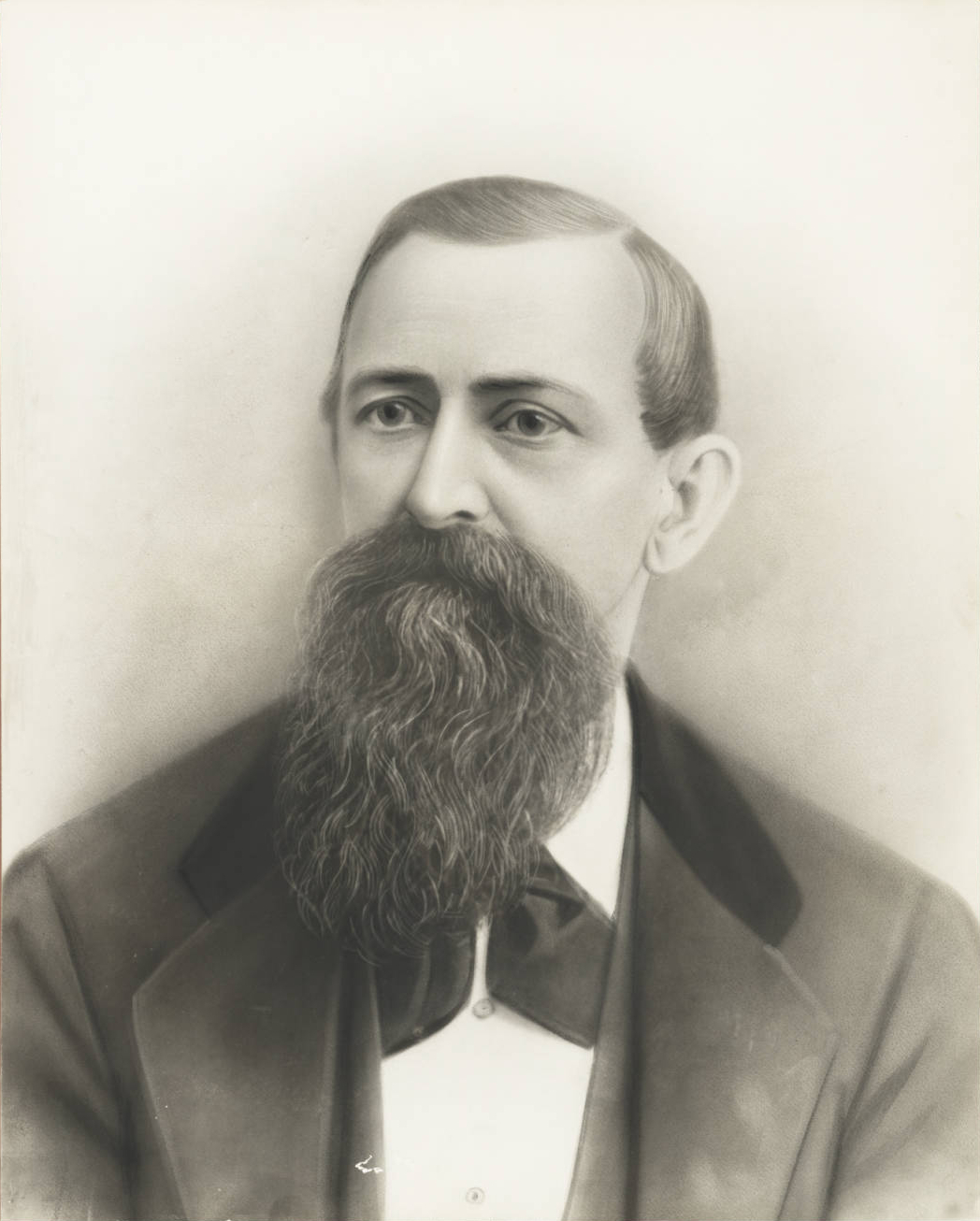
- Bredlinger, circa 1865

4th Mayor of Denver
- In office 1864–1865
- Preceded by: Amos Steck
- Succeeded by: George T. Clark

Personal details
- Born: April 15, 1825 New Hanover, Pennsylvania, U.S.
- Died: May 14, 1894 (aged 69) Denver, Colorado, U.S.

Hiram J. Brendlinger (April 15, 1825 – May 14, 1894) was an American politician. He served as Mayor of Denver, Colorado from 1864 to 1865.

== Biography ==
He was born in 1825 in New Hanover, Pennsylvania to John Brendlinger and Theresa Edmonia Herman. He served as Mayor of Denver, Colorado from 1864 to 1865. He died on May 14, 1894.
