= William H. Sharpley =

American politician (1854–1928)

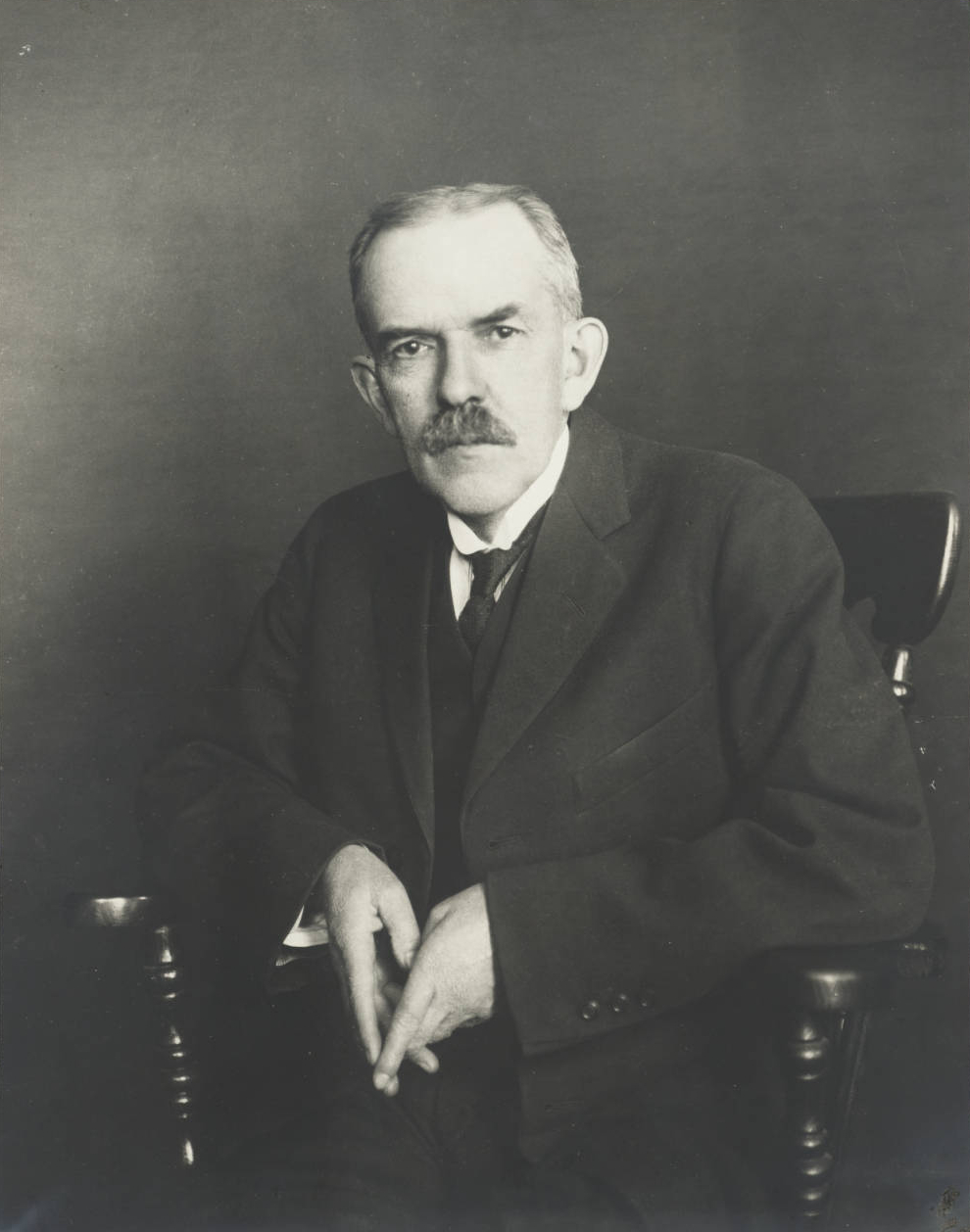
- Sharpley, circa 1916

29th Mayor of Denver
- In office 1915–1916
- Preceded by: J. M. Perkins
- Succeeded by: Robert W. Speer

Member of the Colorado Senate from the 1st district
- In office 1911–1915
- Preceded by: James C. Burger
- Succeeded by: Frank L. Dodge

Personal details
- Born: December 2, 1854 Norfolk, Virginia, U.S.
- Died: December 5, 1928 (aged 74) Denver, Colorado, U.S.
- Party: Democratic
- Spouse: Kate Lennon (m. 1883)
- Education: University of Denver

William H. Sharpley (December 2, 1854 – December 5, 1928) was an American politician who served as the mayor of Denver, Colorado from 1915 to 1916.

== Biography ==
Sharpley was born on December 2, 1854 in Norfolk, Virginia. He attended public schools in Denver. He studied at the University of Denver, his tuition funded by his work with newspapers.

He worked as a police surgeon from 1898 to 1904, then worked as a health commissioner from 1904 to 1912. From 1911 to 1915, he was a member of the Colorado Senate from the 1st district. From 1915 to 1916, he was mayor of Denver. He was the Denver Manager of Health and Charity from 1915 to 1923, handling the Spanish flu while in office.

He died in Denver of heart disease on December 5, 1928, aged 74.
