= William J. Barker (Denver mayor) =

American politician

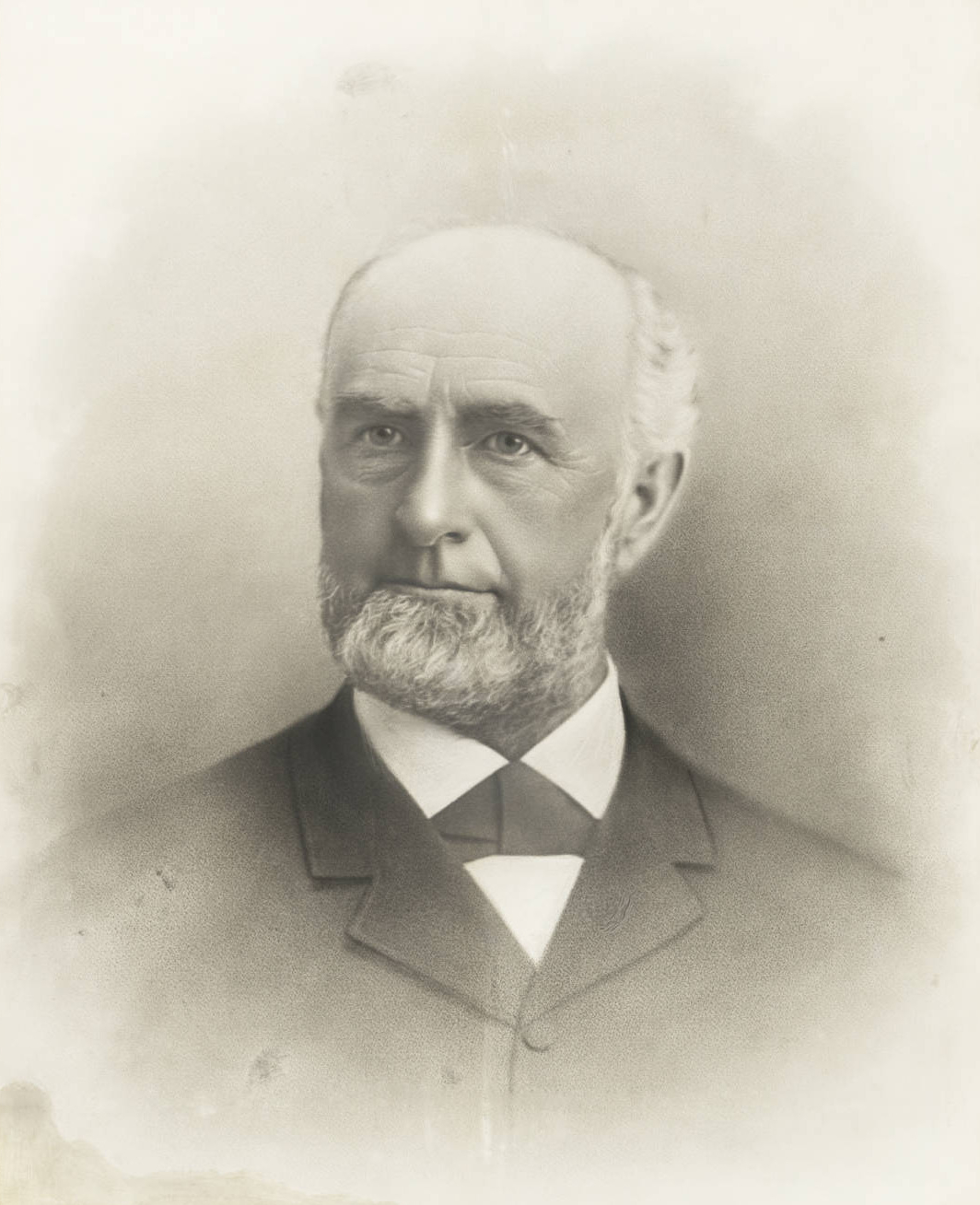
- Barker, circa 1875

12th Mayor of Denver
- In office 1874–1876
- Preceded by: Francis M. Case
- Succeeded by: R. G. Buckingham

Personal details
- Born: December 23, 1831 Watkins, New York, U.S.
- Died: March 27, 1900 (aged 68) Denver Colorado, U.S.

William J. Barker (December 23, 1831 – March 27, 1900) was an American politician who served as the mayor of Denver, Colorado from 1874 to 1876. He was a pioneer and moved to Denver in 1860, buying a large amount of property. 1876, Barker's last year as mayor office, is the same year Colorado was granted statehood.

He is buried in the Fairmount Cemetery.
