= William Scott Lee =

American politician (c.1851–1916)

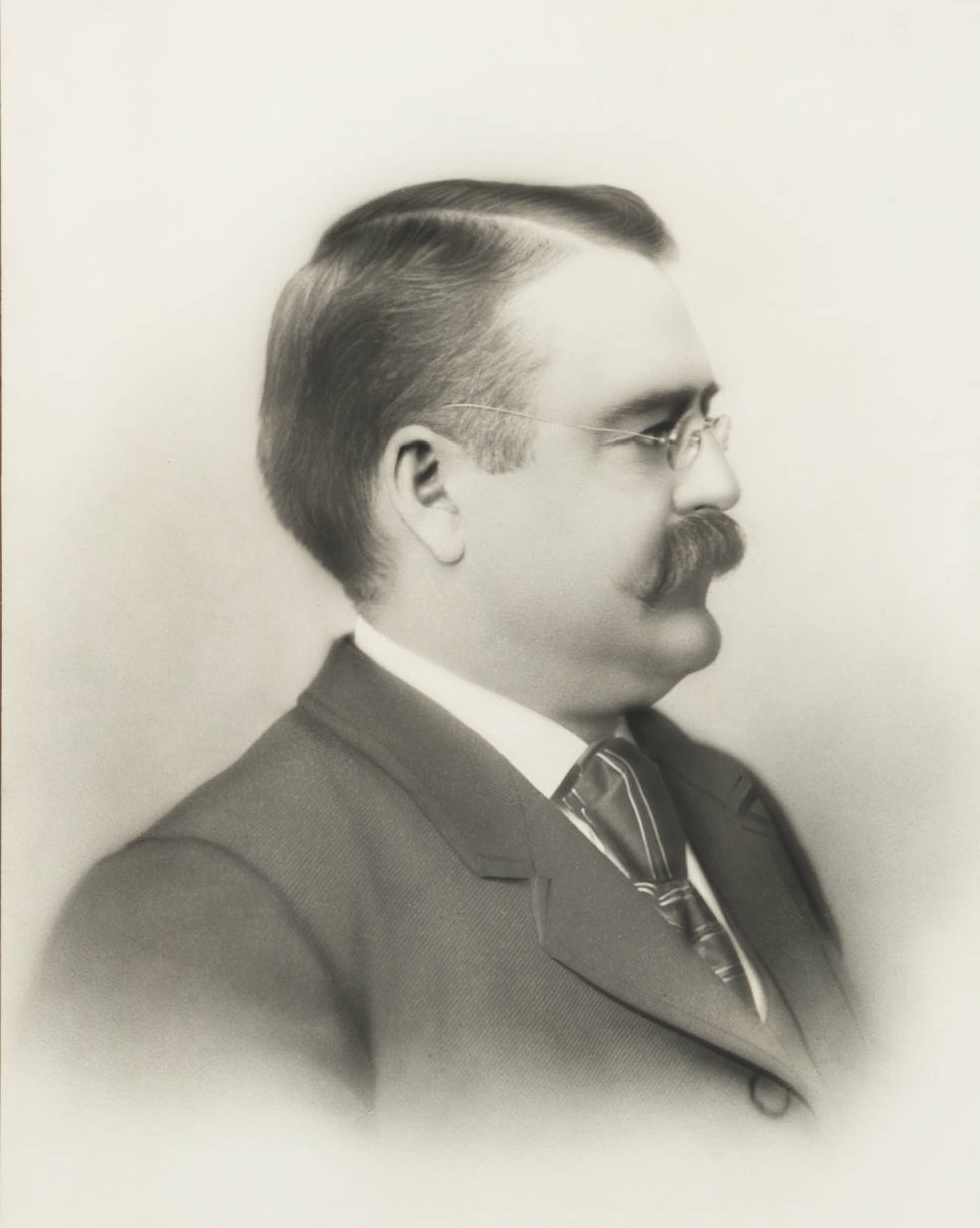
- Lee, circa 1888

19th Mayor of Denver
- In office 1887–1889
- Preceded by: Joseph E. Bates
- Succeeded by: Wolfe Londoner

Personal details
- Born: c. 1851
- Died: 1916 (aged 64–65)

William Scott Lee (c. 1851–1916) was an American politician who served as the mayor of Denver, Colorado from 1887 to 1889.
