= William A. H. Loveland =

American businessman (1826–1894)

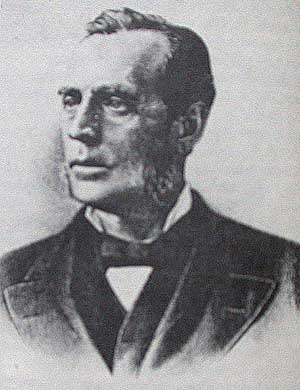
William A. H. Loveland from a 19th-century engraving

William Austin Hamilton Loveland (May 30, 1826 – 1894) was a U.S. railroad entrepreneur and businessman in the late 19th century. An early resident of Golden when it was the capital of the Colorado Territory, he was one of the founders of the Colorado Central Railroad and a principal figure in the early history of Colorado. As president of the Colorado Central, he was instrumental in the expansion of the railroad network into the mining communities of Colorado. For much of the 1870s Loveland waged a fierce struggle with Union Pacific investors for control of the Colorado Central.

== Biography ==
His father was the Rev. Leonard Loveland, a prominent Methodist minister and prisoner of war in the War of 1812. As a young man, Loveland served in the Mexican–American War, serving as a wagonmaster with the Illinois Volunteers. Serving in the battles of Veracruz and Puebla, Loveland was severely wounded in the leg by an exploding shell nearby in the Battle of Chapultepec, and spent seven months recovering in a military hospital in Mexico City. Loveland was given an honorable medical discharge and returned to the United States. Despite having a noticeable disability from his wounds Loveland was undeterred in pursuing a full and highly productive life. He entered the mercantile business in Illinois, and married Phelena Shaw in 1853. Following the death of Phelena (1854), Loveland married Miranda Ann Montgomery in 1856.

In 1859 Loveland joined the Colorado Gold Rush, and helped establish the town of the Golden in the Kansas Territory and went into the mercantile business there, building the town's first storefront and second building. After the formation of the Colorado Territory in 1861, he was instrumental in helping establish the territorial capital at Golden. He offered the use of his building, which also was a public hall that was central to the town's activities, to the House of Representatives while another in the same block served the Council (Senate). When most of Golden's leading citizens left to fight in the American Civil War, Loveland kept the languishing town alive. In 1863 he lent the use of his building as officers quarters for the Union troops training at Camp Leavenworth in Golden, and also provided them provisions and supplies in his support of the war effort, and these troops went on to fight with the 2nd Colorado Volunteers. At the height of the depression Loveland built the town's first brick storefront in 1863 to house his mercantile business, the Loveland Block, now considered to be the oldest existing commercial brick structure in Colorado. The building also served to house the first Masonic Lodge in Colorado, who partnered to build the structure. It was expanded in 1866 to accommodate both houses the Colorado Territorial Legislature on its upper floor, which met there until the capital was moved to Denver in 1867. The Territorial Library and Territorial Supreme Court were also housed there.

In the 1860s, Loveland became an enthusiastic promoter of building a railroad west of Golden through the Rocky Mountains, with the idea that Golden would become a great railroad metropolis of the region. In the early 1860s he began purchasing right-of-way in the canyon west of Golden. In 1864, he helped found the Colorado, Clear Creek and Pacific Railway (later Colorado Central Railroad) with the intention of building a rail line the mining communities, and connecting it to the transcontinental railroad that was to be built to the north across present-day Wyoming. Loveland's early efforts to build a railroad were hampered by a lack of funds, as well as a fierce struggle for control of the railroad itself. In the meantime, in 1867, the territorial capital was moved to Denver, and in 1870, the rival Denver Pacific Railway completed its line between Denver and Cheyenne, cementing Denver as the future metropolis of Colorado. Loveland and his partners had to settle for connecting Golden to the Denver Pacific line. It was not until 1877 that the company was able to construct its own direct line from Golden (via Boulder and Fort Collins) to Cheyenne. After the completion of the line, the new city of Loveland, Colorado was founded in Larimer County along the route and named in his honor. Loveland Pass in the Rockies west of Golden is also named for him.

In 1870, Loveland was instrumental in persuading the Colorado Territorial Legislature to authorize funds for the establishment of the Colorado School of Mines in Golden. He later served as the first chairman of the board of trustees of the School of Mines after the Episcopal Church sold it to the Territory in 1874.

Loveland was one of the most prominent philanthropists his area has known, whose contributions also helped build the community. Loveland gave land for three schools in Golden, and six churches including the Methodist (3rd church in Colorado), Baptist (oldest church of its faith in Colorado), Episcopalian, Disciples of Christ, Presbyterian, and Lutheran (first Swedish immigrant church in Colorado). He regularly lent his hall for public events, community organizations and governmental entities, including the municipal, county and Territorial governments.

As Mayor of Golden (1874–75), Loveland ordered the Golden firefighters to the aid of Central City, Colorado when it was stricken by fire in 1874. Considered the first mutual aid call in Colorado history, the Golden firemen, arriving by the railroad, succeeded in saving the upper part of the city.

In 1878 Loveland became the second owner of the Rocky Mountain News, purchasing it from founder William N. Byers. At that time Loveland moved to Denver, but kept an active role in Golden's affairs.

In 1889, in partnership with Charles Welch, Loveland platted a new 13-block country town along Colfax Avenue west of Denver. The town, called Lakewood, would eventually grow to Colorado's fourth largest municipality by 1990. It was laid out along the new mass transit line Loveland helped spearhead in 1890, the Denver, Lakewood & Golden Railway. Loveland moved to Lakewood in 1889.

Loveland died in 1894 in Lakewood and was buried in Denver's Fairmount Cemetery. Loveland's mercantile business founded in 1859 continued until 1978 as one of the longest-lived businesses in Colorado history. His earliest Colorado residence, the Loveland Cottage in Golden, which he purchased from a town attorney, still stands at 717 12th Street. The Loveland Block, also a designated historic landmark at 1122 Washington Avenue, is listed on the National Register of Historic Places. His Lakewood home, built in 1888 at 1435 Harlan Street, also still stands. Loveland had two sons, Francis William and William Leonard, and an adopted daughter, Jennie Froggatt Loveland.

Party political offices
Preceded by Bela M. Hughes	Democratic nominee for Governor of Colorado; 1878	Succeeded by John S. Hough
