= 1878 Colorado gubernatorial election =

- October 1, 1878
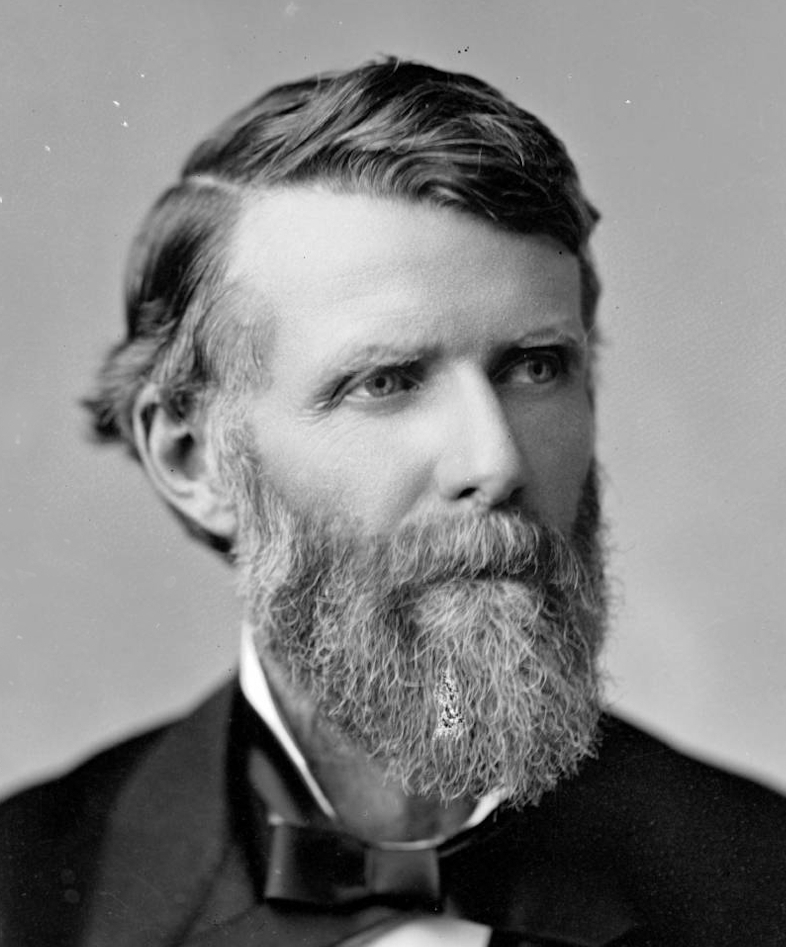

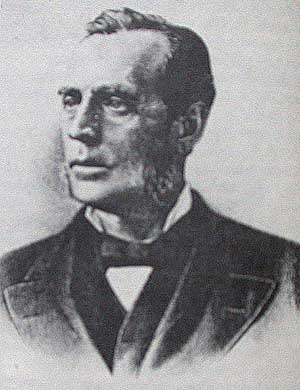

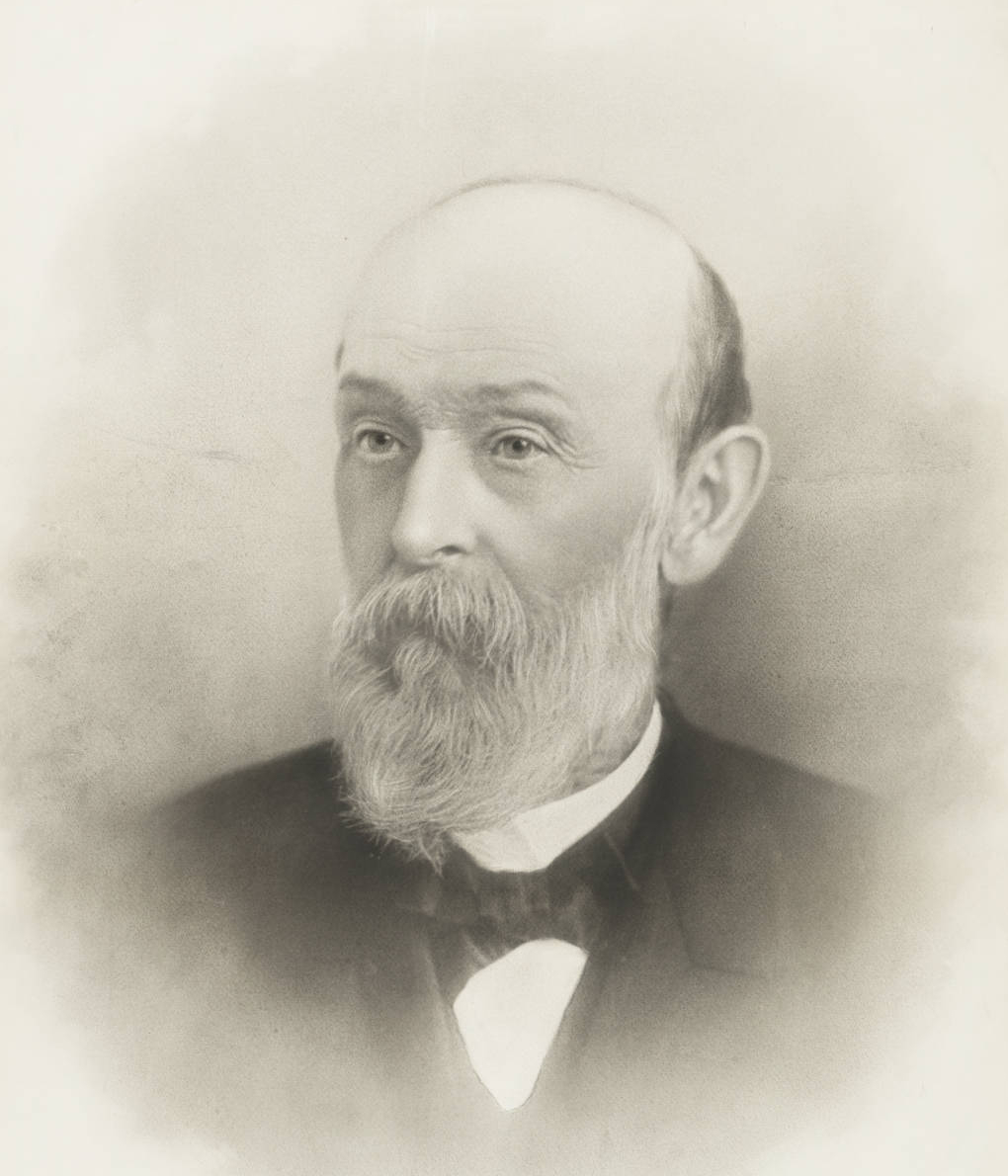
Nominee	Frederick Walker Pitkin	William A. H. Loveland	R. G. Buckingham
Party	Republican	Democratic	Greenback
Popular vote	14,308	11,535	2,783
Percentage	49.98%	40.30%	9.72%
- County results Pitkin: 40–50% 50–60% 60–70% 70–80% Loveland: 40–50% 50–60%
Governor before election
John Long Routt
Republican
Elected Governor
Frederick Walker Pitkin
Republican

The 1878 Colorado gubernatorial election was held on October 1, 1878. Republican nominee Frederick Walker Pitkin defeated Democratic nominee William A. H. Loveland with 49.98% of the vote.

== General election ==
=== Candidates ===
Major party candidates

- Frederick Walker Pitkin, Republican
- William A. H. Loveland, Democratic

Other candidates

- R. G. Buckingham, Greenback

=== Results ===
1878 Colorado gubernatorial election
Party	Candidate	Votes	%	±%
Republican	Frederick Walker Pitkin	14,308	49.98%	−1.55%
Democratic	William A. H. Loveland	11,535	40.30%	−8.17%
Greenback	R. G. Buckingham	2,783	9.72%	N/A
Majority		2,773	9.68%	+6.62%
Turnout		28,626		
Republican hold		Swing		

==== By county ====
County	Pitkin %	Pitkin #	Loveland %	Loveland #	Buckingham %	Buckingham #	Total
Arapahoe	55.50%	2,218	36.28%	1,450	8.20%	328	3,996
Bent	45.95%	193	52.61%	221	1.42%	6	420
Boulder	43.54%	988	27.63%	627	28.82%	684	2,269
Clear Creek	49.51%	1,062	37.94%	814	12.54%	269	2,145
Conejos	44.84%	400	53.58%	478	1.56%	14	892
Costilla	58.14%	339	41.86%	244	0.00%	0	583
Douglas	52.42%	494	41.49%	205	6.07%	30	729
El Paso	70.94%	884	27.28%	340	1.76%	22	1,246
Elbert	45.80%	153	47.90%	160	6.28%	21	334
Fremont	52.72%	339	34.52%	222	12.75%	82	643
Gilpin	53.17%	1,037	32.46%	633	14.35%	280	1,950
Grand	43.42%	33	55.26%	42	1.31%	1	76
Gunnison	64.23%	88	35.76%	49	0.00%	0	137
Hinsdale	48.48%	319	43.00%	283	8.51%	56	658
Huerfano	46.69%	438	52.87%	496	0.42%	4	938
Jefferson	34.02%	425	49.15%	614	16.81%	210	1,249
La Plata	50.89%	142	49.10%	137	0.00%	0	279
Lake	46.54%	977	45.40%	953	8.05%	169	2,099
Larimer	42.63%	362	41.69%	354	15.66%	133	849
Las Animas	38.84%	641	59.21%	977	1.93%	32	1,650
Ouray	58.83%	413	36.75%	258	4.41%	31	702
Park	55.53%	311	43.21%	242	1.25%	7	560
Pueblo	45.59%	507	52.51%	584	1.88%	21	1,112
Rio Grande	61.36%	251	36.91%	151	0.73%	3	409
Routt	42.00%	21	58.00%	29	0..%	0	50
Saguache	60.41%	235	39.58%	154	0.00%	0	389
San Juan	51.85%	308	40.23%	239	7.91%	47	594
Summit	62.21%	191	34.52%	106	3.25%	10	307
Weld	50.73%	618	23.89%	291	25.36%	309	1,218

Counties that flipped from Democratic to Republican

- Douglas
- Fremont
- La Plata
- Lake
- San Juan

Counties that flipped from Republican to Democratic

- Conejos
