= Joseph E. Bates =

American politician (1837–1900)

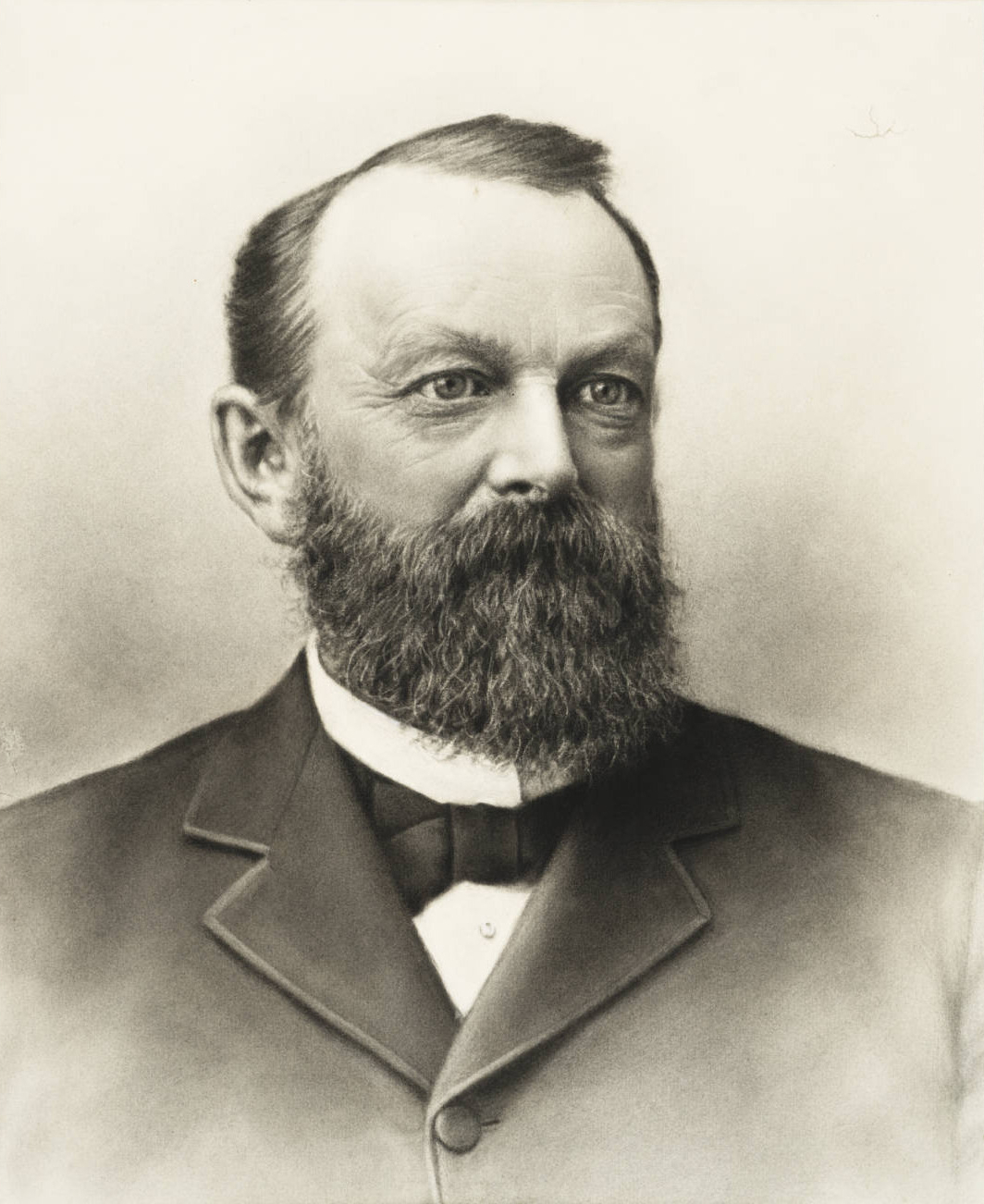
- Bates, circa 1885

10th & 18th Mayor of Denver
- In office 1885–1887
- Preceded by: John Long Routt
- Succeeded by: William Scott Lee
- In office 1872–1873
- Preceded by: John Harper
- Succeeded by: Francis M. Case

Personal details
- Born: May 5, 1837 Chautauqua County, New York, U.S.
- Died: September 22, 1900 (aged 63) Denver, Colorado, U.S.

Joseph E. Bates (May 5, 1837 – September 22, 1900) was an American politician who served on the city council and as mayor.

Bates was born in Chautauqua County, New York, and raised in Muskegon County, Michigan. He moved to Denver, Colorado in 1860, where he became involved in working for various businesses. He became active in city politics being elected a city councilor in 1868. Bates established enterprises including the Denver Brewery, Denver Pacific Railroad, and the Denver Smelting and Refining Works. Joseph E. Bates was twice elected Mayor of Denver, in 1872 and again in 1885.

== See also ==
- List of mayors of Denver
