= Robert W. Speer =

American politician (1855–1918)

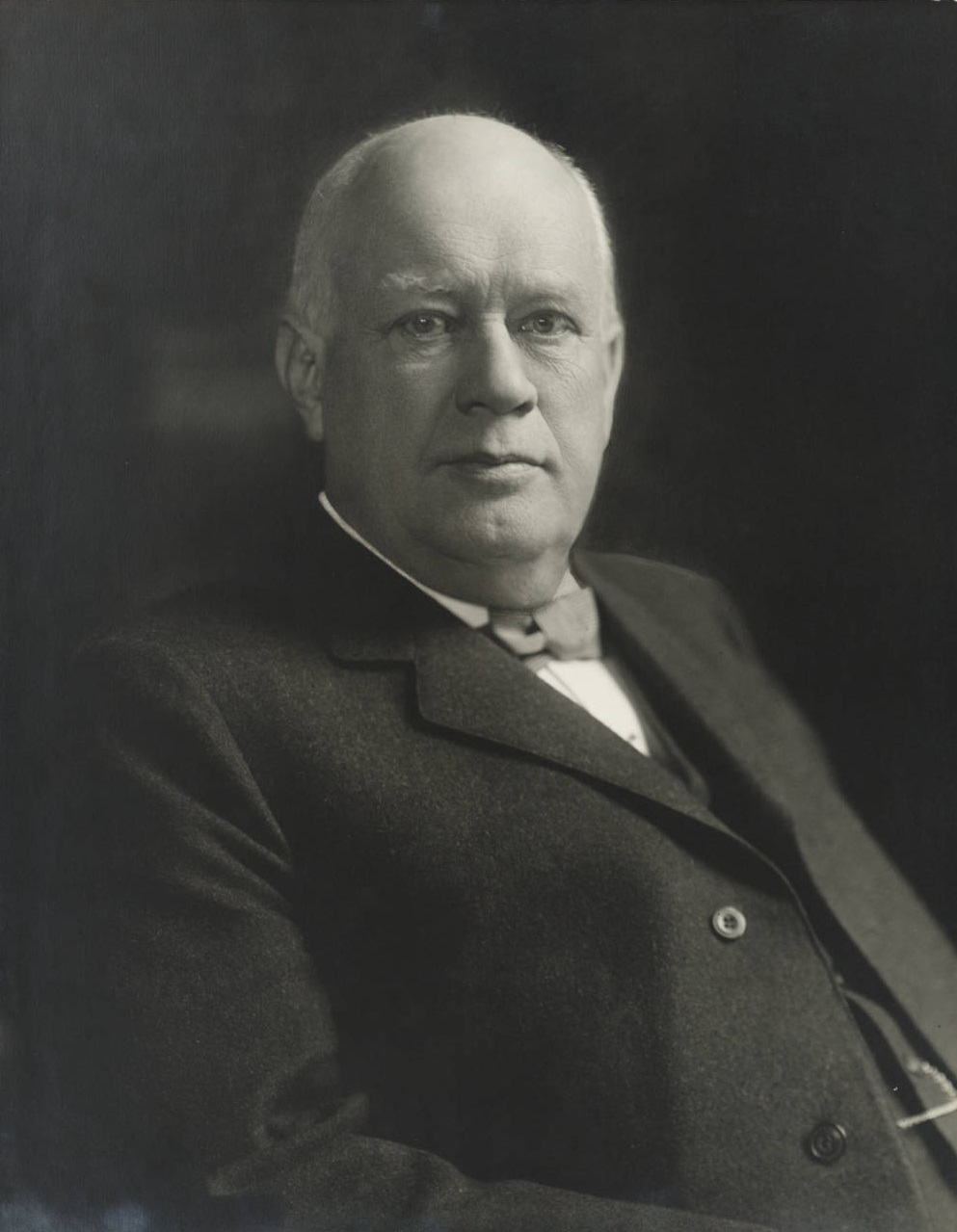
- Speer, circa 1917

30th Mayor of Denver
- In office 1916–1918
- Preceded by: William H. Sharpley
- Succeeded by: William Fitz Randolph Mills

26th Mayor of Denver
- In office 1904–1912
- Preceded by: Robert R. Wright
- Succeeded by: Henry J. Arnold

Personal details
- Born: December 1, 1855 Mount Union, Pennsylvania, U.S.
- Died: May 14, 1918 (aged 62) Denver, Colorado, U.S.
- Party: Non-Political

Robert Walter Speer (December 1, 1855 – May 14, 1918) was elected mayor of Denver, Colorado three times. He served two four-year terms in office from 1904 to 1912. He died from Influenza, early on in the worldwide epidemic of that year on May 14, 1918, while halfway through a third term in office that had started in 1916.

== Biography ==
Speer was born in Mount Union, Pennsylvania, on December 1, 1855. He married Kate Thrush, his childhood sweetheart, in 1882.

As an adherent of the City Beautiful movement, Speer initiated several projects that added new landmarks, updated existing facilities, and signed Speer Amendment for non-political administration, and dropped his Democrat affiliation in 1916 When elected to third term; improved the city's landscape including:

- City Auditorium, site of the 1908 Democratic National Convention
- The Civic Center
- Denver Mountain Parks
- The Denver Zoo expansion from 1906 to 1918.
- Denver Museum of Nature and Science
- The paving and graveling of many of the city's remaining dirt streets
- An urban forestry program that eventually distributed 110,000 free shade trees to city residents

Speer was the first mayor of Denver to die while serving in office. Speer Boulevard in Denver is named in his honor. He is buried in Fairmount Cemetery in Denver.

== Bibliography ==
- Goodstein, Phil (1995). Denver Streets: Names, Numbers, Locations, Logic (2nd Revised ed.). Denver, CO: New Social Publications. ISBN 0-9622169-3-3.
- Johnson, Charles A. (1969). Denver's Mayor Speer. Denver, CO: Green Mountain Press.
- Noel, Thomas Jacob (1997). Mile High City: An Illustrated History of Denver. Denver, CO: A. B. Hirschfeld Press. ISBN 1-886483-10-8.
- "Robert W. Speer, Mayor of Denver, Is Dead: Cathedral Bells Toll as Flags are Placed at Half Mast in Memory". Rocky Mountain News. May 15, 1918. pp. 1, 3.
- Eaton, Raymond A. (May 15, 1918). "Speer was Man of Great Vision; Had Many Ideas for Better City". Rocky Mountain News. p. 3.
- "Speer Always Worked For a City Beautiful; Plans Had Just Begun". Rocky Mountain News. May 15, 1918. p. 3.
- "Some Things Denver Owes to Speer". Rocky Mountain News. May 15, 1918. p. 3.
