= Henry J. Arnold =

American politician

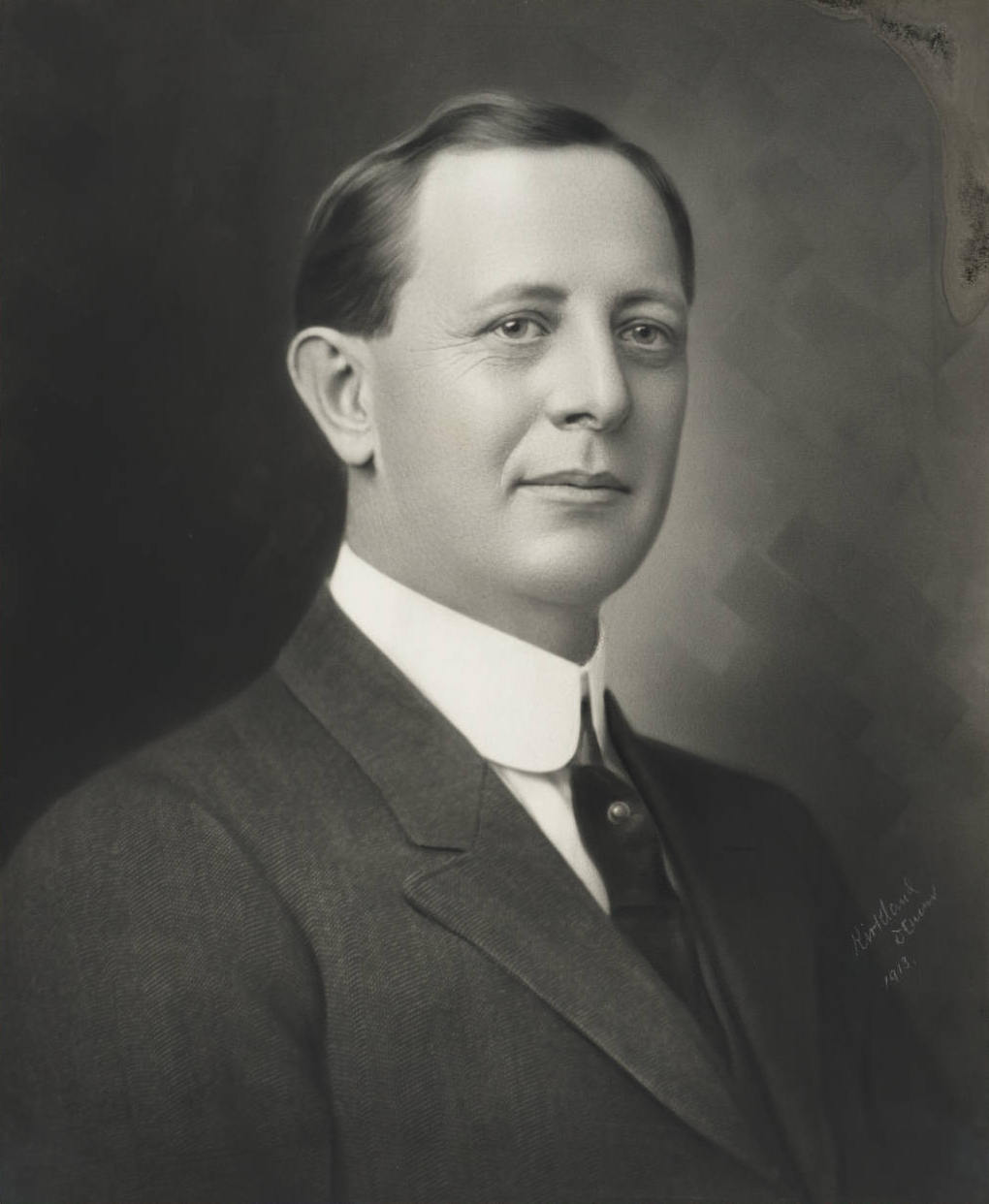
- Arnold, c. 1913

27th Mayor of Denver
- In office 1912–1913
- Preceded by: Robert W. Speer
- Succeeded by: J. M. Perkins

Personal details
- Born: March 14, 1866; Clinton, Missouri, U.S.

Henry J. Arnold (d. November 22, 1926 in Denver) was an American politician who served as the 27th mayor of Denver, Colorado from 1912 to 1913.
