= Harry Arnold =

Harry Arnold may refer to:

- Harry Arnold (musician) (1920–1971), Swedish jazz saxophonist and bandleader
- Harry Arnold (journalist) (1941–2014), British journalist
