= List of mayors of Denver =

Coordinates: 39.7392°N 104.9850°W

Mayor of Denver
- Seal of the City of Denver

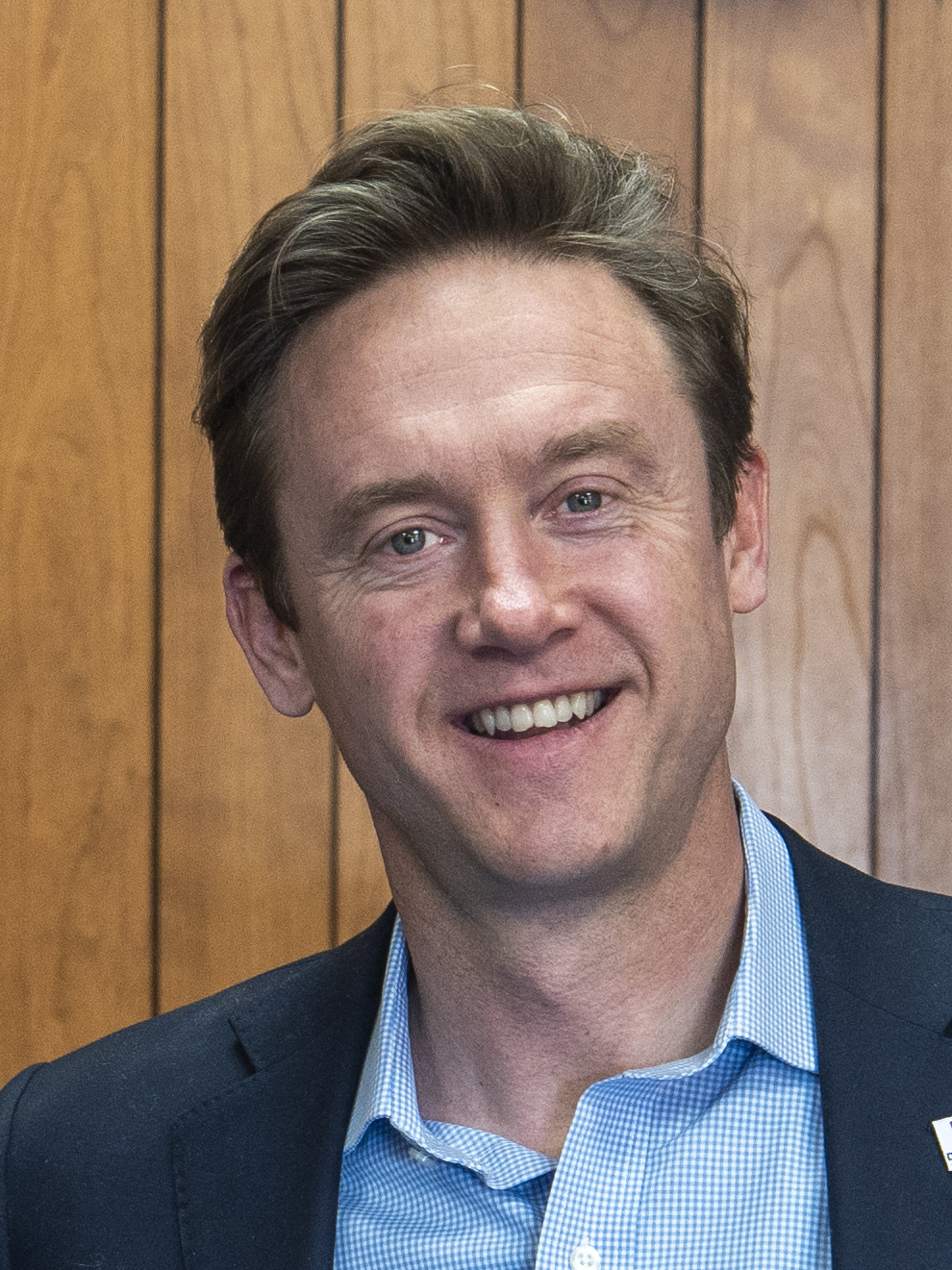
- Incumbent; Mike Johnston since July 17, 2023
- Style: The Honorable
- Residence: Cableland
- Term length: Four years, renewable twice
- Website: denvergov.mayor

This is a list of mayors of Denver, the capital and most populous city of the U.S. state of Colorado. Mayors of Denver can now serve three four-year terms.

== List ==
#	Image	Mayor	Term
1		John C. Moore	1859–1861
2		Charles A. Cook	1861–1863
3		Amos Steck	1863–1864
4		Hiram J. Brendlinger	1864–1865
5		George T. Clark	1865–1866
6		Milton DeLano	1866–1868
7		William M. Clayton	1868–1869
8		Baxter B. Stiles	1869–1871
9		John Harper	1871–1872
10		Joseph E. Bates	1872–1873
11		Francis M. Case	1873–1874
12		William J. Barker	1874–1876
13		R. G. Buckingham	1876–1877
14		Baxter B. Stiles	1877–1878
15		Richard Sopris	1878–1881
16		Robert Morris	1881–1883
17		John Long Routt	1883–1885
18		Joseph E. Bates	1885–1887
19		William Scott Lee	1887–1889
20		Wolfe Londoner	1889–1891
21		Platt Rogers	1891–1893
22		M. D. Van Horn	1893–1895
23		Thomas S. McMurray	1895–1899
24		Henry V. Johnson	1899–1901
25		Robert R. Wright	1901–1904
26		Robert W. Speer	1904–1912
27		Henry J. Arnold	1912–1913
28		J. M. Perkins	1913–1915
29		William H. Sharpley	1915–1916
30		Robert W. Speer	1916–1918
31		William Fitz Randolph Mills	1918–1919
32		Dewey C. Bailey	1919–1923
33		Benjamin F. Stapleton	1923–1931
34		George D. Begole	1931–1935
35		Benjamin F. Stapleton	1935–1947
36		J. Quigg Newton	1947–1955
37		Will Nicholson	1955–1959
38		Richard Batterton	1959–1963
39		Tom Currigan	1963–1968
40		William H. McNichols Jr.	December 31, 1968–July 2, 1983
41		Federico Peña	July 2, 1983–July 15, 1991
42		Wellington Webb	July 15, 1991–July 21, 2003
43		John Hickenlooper	July 21, 2003–January 12, 2011
44		Bill Vidal	January 12, 2011-July 18, 2011
45		Michael Hancock	July 18, 2011–July 17, 2023
46		Mike Johnston	July 17, 2023–present

== See also ==
- List of municipalities in Colorado
- Bibliography of Colorado
- Geography of Colorado
- History of Colorado
- Index of Colorado-related articles
- List of Colorado-related lists
- Outline of Colorado
