= Frontier Park =

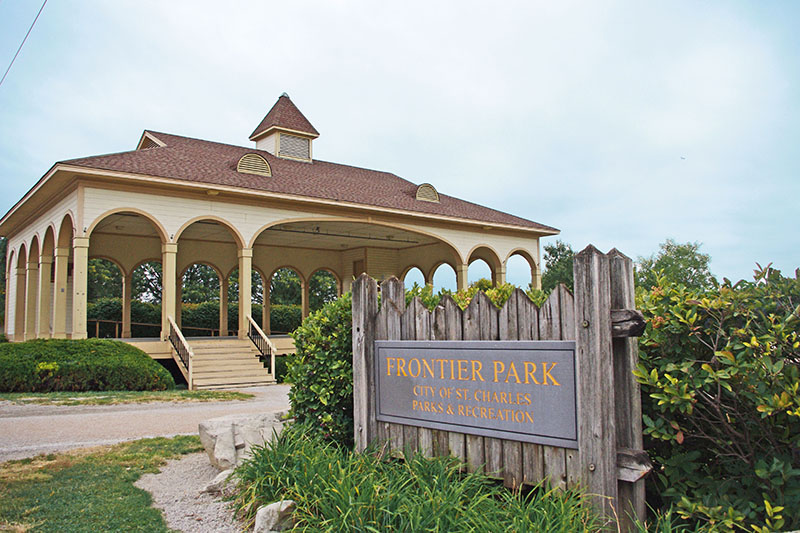

Frontier Park may refer to:

== Australia ==
- Frontier Park, a park in Aintree, Victoria

== United States ==
- Frontier Park, a park in Simi Valley, California
- Frontier Park, a park in Hays, Kansas
- Frontier Park, a park in St. Charles, Missouri
- Frontier Park, a park in North Ridgeville, Ohio
- Frontier Park, a city park in Erie, Pennsylvania
- Frontier Park, the location of Cheyenne Frontier Days in Wyoming

== See also ==
- Grant-Frontier Park, in Denver, Colorado
- Innovative Field, formerly Frontier Field, a baseball stadium in Rochester, New York
