= Montana City =

Montana City may refer to:

- Montana City, Colorado
- Montana City, Montana
