= Flora Carnell Lewis =

American artist (1894–1972)

- Born: October 9, 1894; Atchison, Kansas, U.S.
- Died: 1972 (aged 77–78); Marshall, Missouri, U.S.
- Occupation: Painter
- Known for: Farm Life (1939)

Flora Carnell Lewis (October 9, 1894 – 1972) was an American painter known for her depictions of rural life in Missouri. Born in Atchison, Kansas, she spent most of her life in Marshall, Missouri. A self-taught artist, Lewis began painting at a young age and developed a distinctive style that emphasized storytelling through art.

== Biography ==
In 1933, Lewis gained early recognition when she won an award for her submission to the Chicago World's Fair. She later gained wider attention when her painting Farm Life won a blue ribbon at the 1939 Missouri State Fair. The painting, depicting an African American farm, was notable for its unconventional artistic techniques, including the use of muslin instead of canvas and a combination of oil and aluminum paint to highlight metal elements.

Following her Missouri State Fair win, some artists protested her win, claiming Lewis had not adhered to traditional perspective rules. The controversy surrounding her win led to increased public interest in her work. As a result, Farm Life was included in the 1939 exhibition Contemporary Unknown American Painters at the Museum of Modern Art in New York City.

Lewis continued painting throughout her life, winning multiple awards. In 1971, just a year before her death, she won first prize at the River Bend Art Fair in Atchison, Kansas, for her painting Advancement and Patriotism of the Negro Race.

== Exhibitions ==
- 1933 – Chicago World’s Fair
- 1939 – Tower Theater Exhibition, organized by Tower Theaters
- 1939 – Contemporary Unknown American Painters Exhibition, organized by the Museum of Modern Art
- 1939 – Missouri State Fair, organized by the Missouri State Fair Commission
- 1971 – River Bend Art Fair

== Awards ==
- 1933 – Award, Chicago World’s Fair
- 1939 – Award, Missouri State Fair
- 1971 – Award, River Bend Art Fair

== Legacy ==
Despite her artistic achievements, Lewis' career remains relatively undocumented, with limited biographical records beyond the controversy over her 1939 Missouri State Fair win. However, her work continues to be a subject of research and is recognized for its contribution to Missouri's artistic heritage.

Her story was featured in the Missouri Remembers: Artists in Missouri through 1951 project, which aims to document the many artists who called Missouri home.

== Bibliography ==
- Flora Lewis: Artist File, Spencer Art Reference Library, The Nelson-Atkins Museum of Art, Kansas City, Missouri.
- Sam Blain, “Research on Missouri Artists,” five binders of documented Missouri artists.
- “Washington, Flora Carnell,” in Philbrook Art Center, American Folk Art From the Ozarks to the Rockies (Tulsa: Philbrook Art Center, 1975), no. 68-69.
- Cederholm, Theresa Dickason (1973). "Lewis, Mrs. Percy". Afro-American Artists: A Bio-Bibliographical Dictionary. Boston: Trustees of the Boston Public Library. p. 180.
- Janis, Sidney (1942). "Flora Lewis". They Taught Themselves: American Primitive Painters of the 20th Century. New York: The Dial Press. pp. 208–212.
- "Tea at Big Sister Home". Kansas City Times. October 2, 1939.
- "'Farm Life,' by Mrs. Percy Lewis". The Arts Quarterly. 2 (3): 18. September 1939.
- James K. Hutsell, “Missouri Manuscript,” Warrenton Banner, September 8, 1939, 2.
- "Her Second Art Prize: Painting Award at Fair Does Not Surprise Mrs. Percy Lewis". Kansas City Times. August 24, 1939. p. 1.
- "A Stir Over Art Prize". Kansas City Times. August 23, 1939. p. 1.
- Peter H. Falk, et al., Who Was Who in American Art, 1564-1975: 400 Years of Artists in America (Madison: Sound View Press, 1999).
- Jacobsen, Anita (2002). Jacobsen's Biographical Index of American Artists. Carrollton: A.J. Publications.
