= Charles A. Cook =

American politician

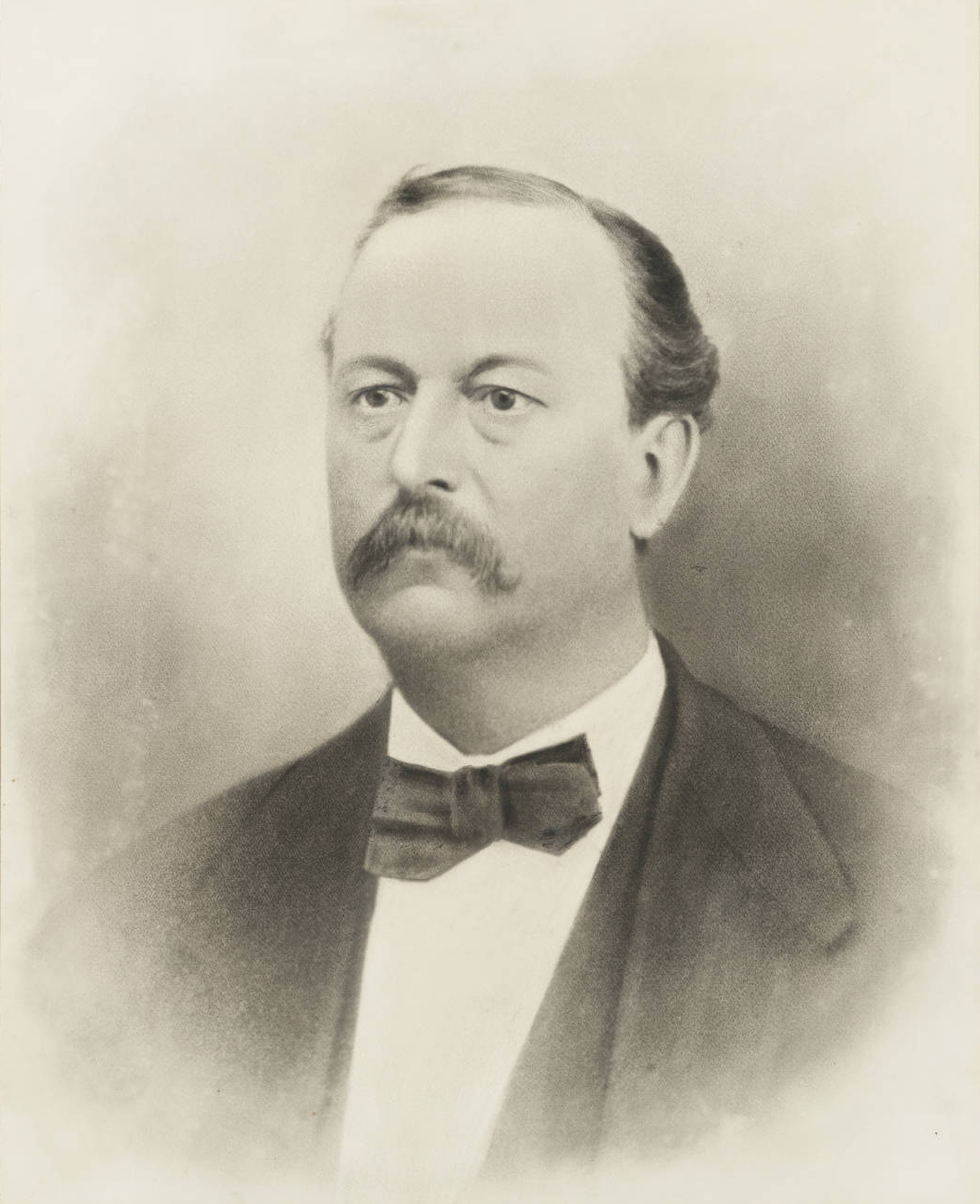
- Cook, circa 1862

2nd Mayor of Denver
- In office 1861–1863
- Preceded by: John C. Moore
- Succeeded by: Amos Steck

Personal details
- Born: Raleigh, North Carolina, U.S.
- Died: March 18, 1878; Hot Springs, Arkansas, U.S.
- Resting place: Riverside Cemetery, Denver, Colorado

Charles A. Cook (died March 18, 1878) was an American politician. He was an early settler of present-day Colorado and the second mayor of Denver. He was indicted and tried for conspiracy to defraud the government for falsifying names on homestead and pre-emption land claims and then selling the property. After the first trial, the case resulted in a hung jury. The charges were thrown out at the second trial.

== Business and political career ==
Cook had owned land in the town of Highland, which he sold on December 6, 1859. He was the second mayor of Denver, Colorado, serving from November 1861, when Denver was part of the Kansas Territory, until April 1863. He succeeded John C. Moore, who served as mayor 1859 to 1861 when Denver was part of the provisional Jefferson Territory. Cook was one of the directors of the Butterfield Overland Dispatch Company, which provided stage coach and mail service through Denver, one of the original stockholders of First National Bank of Denver, and of the C.A. Cook and Company.

== Las Animas land grab ==
In 1874, Cook was indicted for a land scandal, known as the Las Animas land grab. It involved land where farmers lived on the land that was originally part of two Mexican land grants with the consent of the owners. Congress opened the land to pre-emption and homestead claims, but gave the farmers one year to file their claims. However, before they could file their claims, there was a claim made on the land due to a projected railroad line. The claim was later withdrawn, but it was after the one-year deadline for the farmers. In the meantime, new claimants with false names had transferred the land to Robert E. Carr and David Moffat, who was a friend and banking partner of Cook's. Cook was a land office employee and was found to be involved, but Carr and Moffat were not initially implicated. Cook, Moffat, and Irving W. Stanton were tried for conspiracy to defraud the government in 1875, and were represented by among the state's best attorneys. The case resulted in a hung jury. The case was then tried in 1878 in the U.S. District Court, but the charges were dropped for lack of evidence. Most newspapers at the time reported it as a fraudulent land deal.

A bill went to the Supreme Court of the United States entitled Colorado Coal & Iron Company v. United States on January 22, 1880. It was filed in the name of the United States by the attorney general to declare void and cancel 61 patents for land in Las Animas county amounting to a total of 9,565.95 acres. The Southern Colorado Coal & Town Company acquired the land to mine for coal. The Supreme Court stated that the question must be determined according to the facts in existence at the time of the sale. If upon the premises at that time there were not actual 'known mines' capable of being profitably worked for their product, so as to make the land more valuable for mining than for agriculture, a title to them acquired under the pre-emption act cannot be successfully assailed. In the present case, the testimony, in our opinion, does not justify us in finding that at the time Jackson acquired his title there were upon any part of the premises in controversy any 'known mines' of coal, in the sense of the statute. For these reasons the decree of the circuit court is reversed, and the cause remanded, with a direction to dismiss the bill; and it is so ordered.

== Death ==
He died on March 18, 1878, while visiting Hot Springs, Arkansas to improve his faltering health. His remains were returned to Colorado where he was buried in Denver's Riverside Cemetery on March 23, 1878.
