= Confederate Military History =

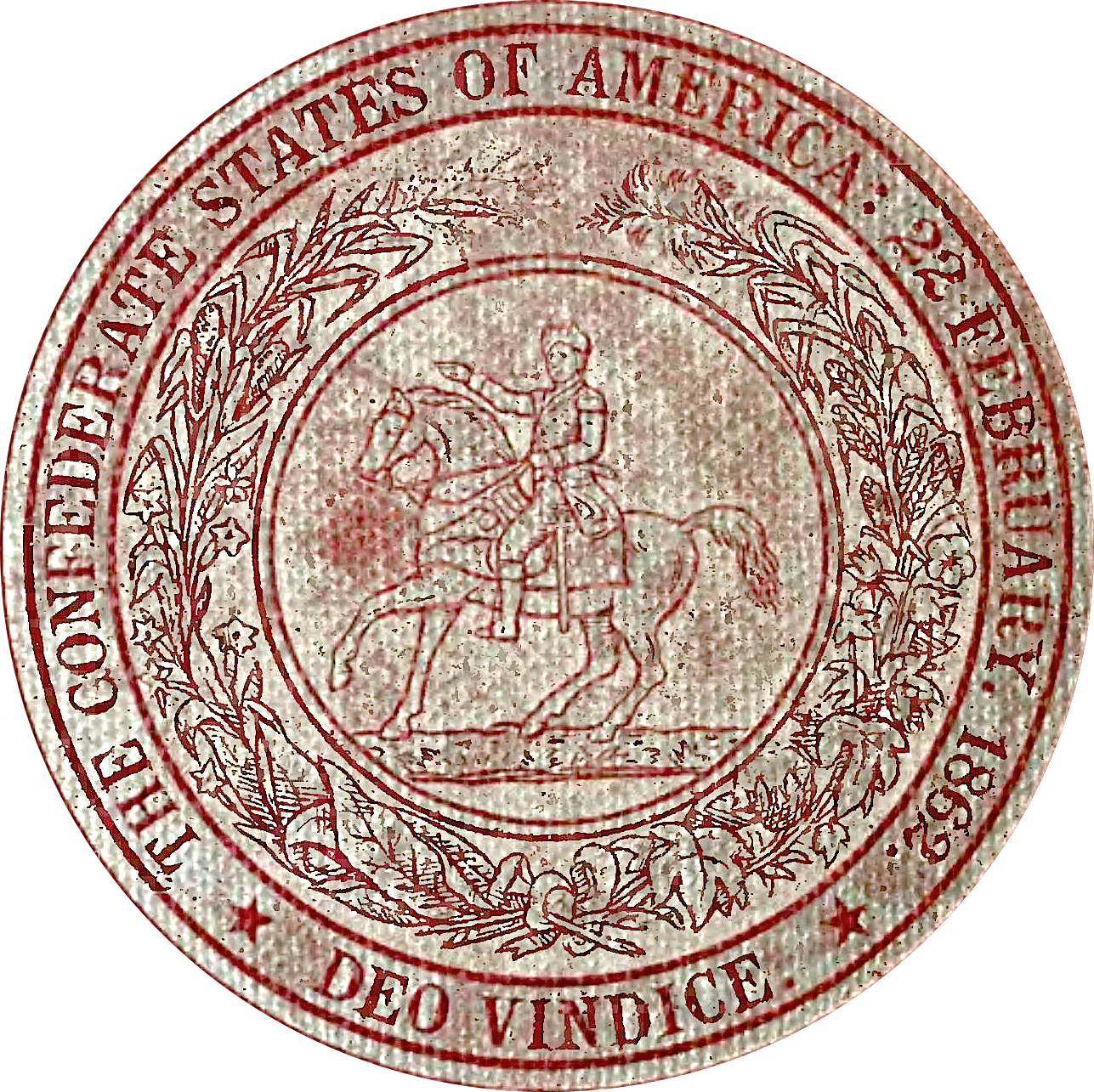
- Edited by Clement A. Evans
- Genre: Non-fiction
- Publisher: Confederate Publishing Company
- Publication date: 1899
- Publication place: U.S.
- OCLC: 951143

Confederate Military History is a 12-volume series of books written and/or edited by former Confederate Brigadier General Clement A. Evans that deals with specific topics related to the military personalities, places, battles, and campaigns in various Southern United States states, including those of the Confederacy.

The books were first published in 1899 in Atlanta, Georgia, by Confederate Publishing Company. The original title was Confederate Military History: A Library of Confederate States History, written by distinguished men of the South. Several reprint editions exist, with varying numbers of volumes.

== Volumes ==
- Volume I - Secession and Civil History of the Confederate States
  - Civil History of the Confederate States by Brigadier General Clement Evans
- Volume II - Maryland by Brigadier General Bradley Johnson and West Virginia by Colonel Robert White
- Volume III - Virginia by Major Jedediah Hotchkiss
- Volume IV - North Carolina by Daniel Harvey Hill Jr.
- Volume V - South Carolina by Brigadier General Ellison Capers
- Volume VI - Georgia by Joseph Derry
- Volume VII - Alabama by Lieutenant General Joseph Wheeler and Mississippi by Colonel Charles Hooker
- Volume VIII - Tennessee by Lieutenant Colonel James Porter
- Volume IX - Kentucky by Colonel J Stoddard Johnston and Missouri by Colonel John C. Moore
- Volume X - Louisiana by John Dimitry and Arkansas by Colonel John M. Harrell
- Volume XI - Texas by Colonel Oran Roberts and Florida by Colonel John Dickison
- Volume XII - Military and Post War History
  - Confederate States Navy by Captain William Parker

== See also ==
- Bibliography of the American Civil War
