= John M. Harrell =

American lawyer and writer

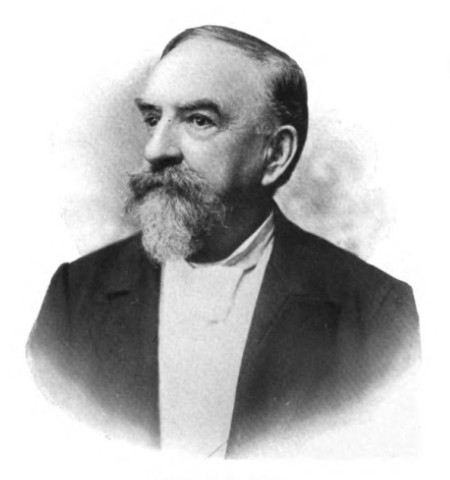
- Harrell in 1899
- Born: John Mortimer Harrell; December 14, 1828; Gatesville, North Carolina, U.S.
- Died: July 4, 1907 (aged 78); San Antonio, Texas, U.S.
- Resting place: Hollywood Cemetery, Hot Springs, Arkansas, U.S. 34°29′08.3″N 93°02′38.6″W
- Education: University of Nashville (BA)
- Spouse: Katie Harrell (m. 1876)
- Writing career
- Subjects: American Civil War; Reconstruction Period
- Notable works: Brooks and Baxter War; Confederate Military History, Volume X
- Military career
- Allegiance: Confederate States
- Service: Confederate States Army
- Service years: 1861–1865
- Rank: Lieutenant-Colonel
- Commands: Harrell's Arkansas Cavalry Battalion
- Wars: American Civil War

John Mortimer Harrell (December 14, 1828 – July 4, 1907) was an American lawyer and writer. He composed the very first telegram sent from Little Rock to Memphis. During the American Civil War, he distinguished himself as a cavalry officer in the operations of the West. Afterwards, he served as commander of the Southern Division, Arkansas United Confederate Veterans.

== Life and career ==
In 1861 John Mortimer Harrell was the political editor of the Old Line Democrat. He was the editor of the Southern States, a weekly that succeeded the Old Line Democrat. In 1876 he was one of the editors of the Arkansas Gazette. Soon after this he removed to Hot Springs, where he continued to reside for many years, until the death of his wife, when he moved out of the State. In about 1880 he was the editor of the Hot Springs Telegraph.

During the Reconstruction Period, he served as secretary of the 1867 Democratic convention. He wrote extensively about politics in Little Rock during this time, keeping newspaper clippings and long commentaries on the articles. His writings were published in 1893 as the Brooks and Baxter War, and are one of the most prominent sources on the Brooks–Baxter War. In 1899, Harrell and John Dimitry co-authored Confederate Military History, Volume X: Louisiana and Arkansas.

== Selected works ==
- Brooks and Baxter War (1893)
- Confederate Military History, Volume X (1899)

== See also ==
- List of United States attorneys for the Eastern District of Arkansas
