= John C. Moore (American politician) =

American politician and journalist (1830s–1915)

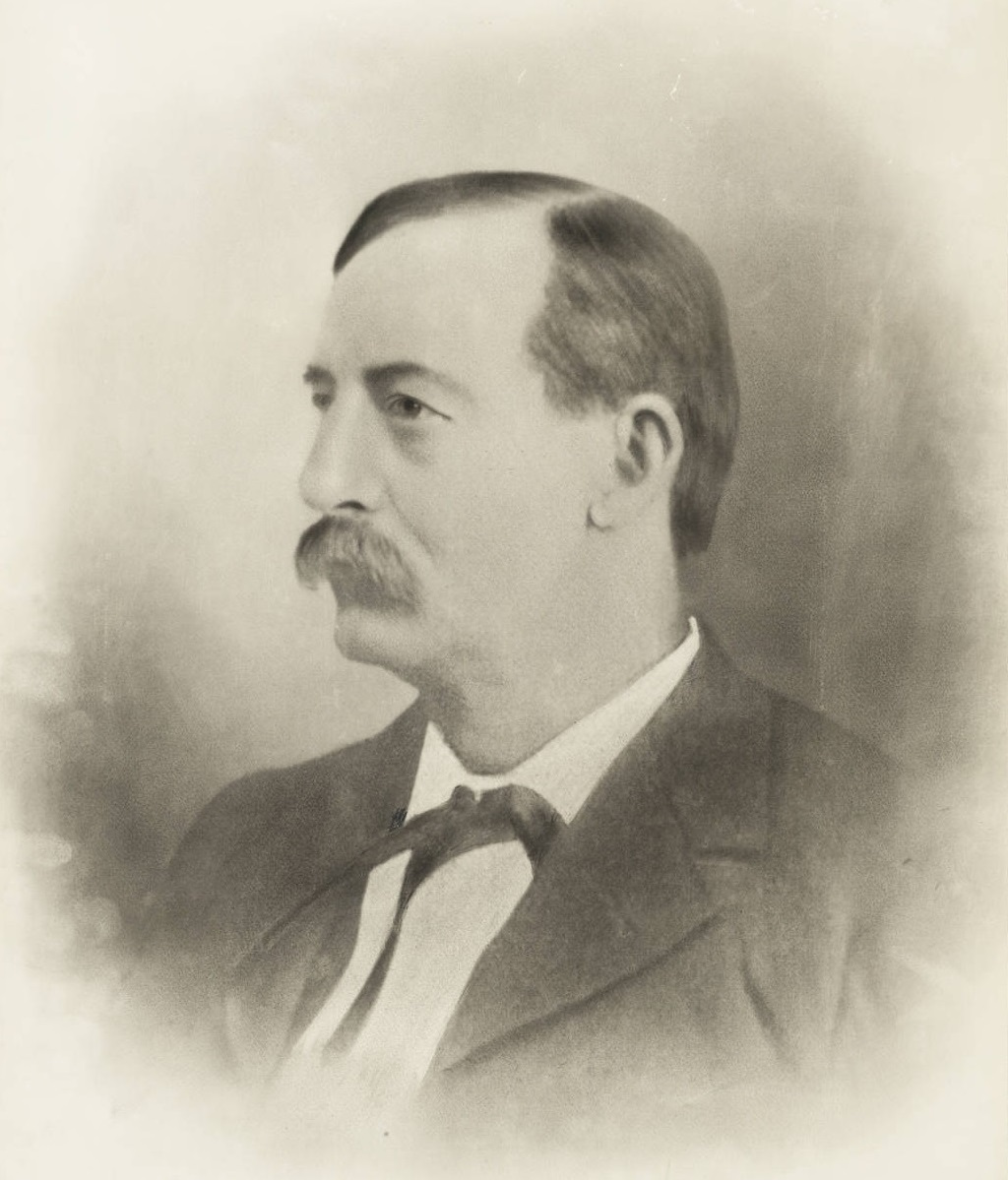
- Moore in 1860

1st Mayor of Denver
- In office 1859–1861
- Preceded by: Office established
- Succeeded by: Charles A. Cook

Personal details
- Born: Early 1830s Pulaski, Tennessee, U.S.
- Died: October 27, 1915 Excelsior Springs, Missouri, U.S.

John Courtney Moore (early 1830s – October 27, 1915) was an American politician and journalist who served as the first mayor of Denver from 1859 to 1861. He was an early settler of Denver, while the area was still a territory of the United States. Moore was a newspaper journalist and publisher, working on papers in Denver, St. Louis, Kansas City, and Pueblo, Colorado. During the American Civil War, he was a judge adjutant general and colonel in the Confederate States Army.

== Early life and education ==
Moore was born between 1830 and 1834. (Note: He was said to have been born in St. Louis on July 21, 1830, in 1831 or in Tennessee on August 18, 1834. Obituaries state that he was 84 years of age when he died in 1915.) He was born in Pulaski, Tennessee, and came as a small boy in 1840 to St. Louis, where he was raised. His father was John S. Moore, a physician, who co-founded the first medical college west of the Mississippi River. Moore was educated at University of Missouri in Columbia, Missouri, and Yale College. He practiced law in St. Louis.

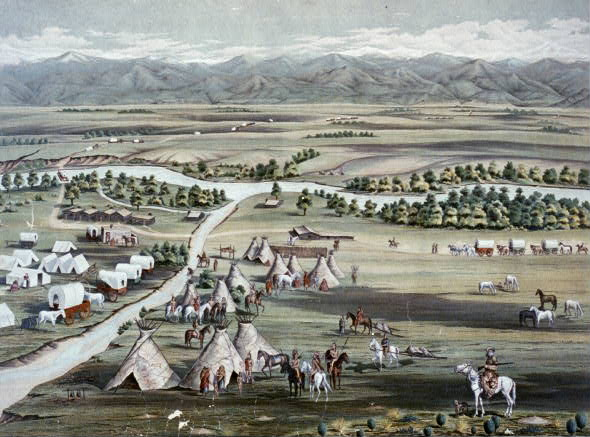
Depiction of what would become Denver in 1859, with settlers in Auraria and Cherry Creek village at the confluence of the South Platte River and Cherry Creek. There were a few cabins at that time.

He came to Colorado during the gold rush and arrived on June 27, 1859. When Moore first came to the present-day area of Denver, there were a few cabins in Cherry Creek village, or Denver, and Auraria settlements. The town of Highland was also established. People traveled by wagon train to reach the area. Within a year, the settlements grew and overland coaches regularly provided coach and mail service from the Missouri River area.

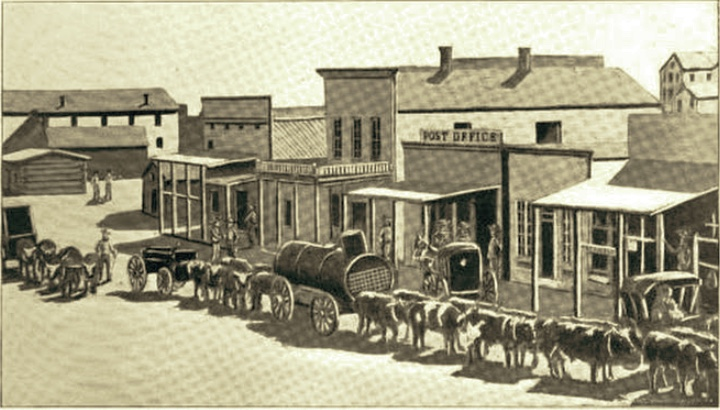
On Larimer Street in autumn of 1860 - Arrival of a steam boiler hauled from the Missouri River by five yoke of oxen.

In 1859, he was elected Territory Representative from the 1st District. He was elected mayor of Denver of Jefferson Territory on December 19, 1859. In January 1860, he began to work with the City Council to establish a municipal government, which was part of the provisional government of Jefferson Territory and subject to laws of Kansas Territory. The three towns of Auraria, Denver, and Highland were consolidated into the city of Denver, which was finalized in March 1860.

He founded the Denver Mountaineer, a daily Democratic newspaper which held strong Southern viewpoints. He was a member of the Colorado Pioneers' Society.

== Military service ==
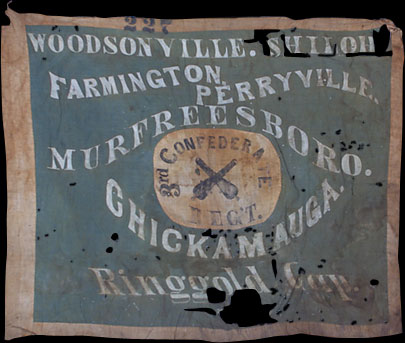
Regimental Color of the 3rd Confederate Infantry Regiment

When the American Civil War began, Moore returned to Missouri and first served with the Missouri State Guards under Sterling Price. He fought in the Battle of Pea Ridge in the battery of soldiers from St. Louis under Captain Emmett MacDonald. During the Battle of Prairie Grove, he was an aide to Colonel Robert G. Shaver.

He then became an officer in the Confederate States Army. He was a friend and school mate of General John S. Marmaduke and became his chief of staff and served as his second in Marmaduke's duel with Confederate General Lucius M. Walker, an event known as the Marmaduke-Walker duel. He served with Marmaduke until the Battle of Mine Creek, when the general was captured. He attained the rank of judge adjutant general of Arkansas for six months. Moore received the rank of colonel while serving under General Joseph O. Shelby. He served with marked distinction. After the Civil War ended, and to keep from surrendering their forces, Moore and Shelby served with the French under Maximilian, tried to serve with Shelby, or held back Maximilian's troops in Mexico.

He wrote the "Missouri" section of the Confederate Military History.

== Later life ==
Moore returned to St. Louis and worked for the St. Louis Post-Dispatch and then moved to Kansas City, where he founded the Kansas City Times. (Note: It was also stated that he was a founder and was the first editor of the old Kansas City Times in the 1850s.) He returned to Colorado and lived in Pueblo, where he founded the Pueblo Democrat and the Pueblo Press. He then returned to Kansas City. (Note: From the biography of his son, Harris, it appears that the children spent some of their childhood in Colorado, but lived mostly in Missouri.)

== Personal life ==
Moore married Pauline Harris, the daughter of Alexander L. Harris, who was the mayor of Kansas City. He and his wife had four children, Harris, Courtney, Sidney, and a daughter who married Charles Cole. He died on October 27, 1915, at the home of his son Harris L. Moore in Excelsior Springs, Missouri.
