= Kansas City Times =

Newspaper from Kansas City, Missouri

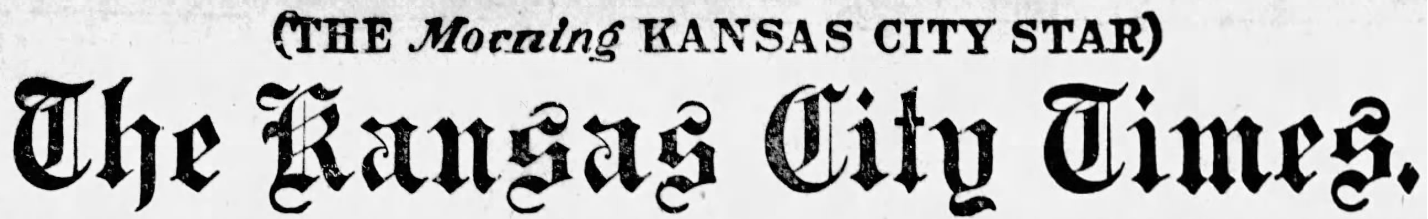
- Type: Daily newspaper
- Founded: 1867
- Ceased publication: 1990
- Headquarters: Kansas City, Missouri

The Kansas City Times was a morning newspaper in Kansas City, Missouri, published from 1867 to 1990. The morning Kansas City Times, under ownership of the afternoon Kansas City Star, won two Pulitzer Prizes and was bigger than its parent when it was renamed Kansas City Star.

== History ==
John C. Moore and John Newman Edwards founded the Kansas City Times in 1867 to support the Democratic Party's anti-Reconstruction policies. Edwards had been adjutant of Confederate general Joseph O. Shelby's division during the American Civil War. Moore was a colonel under Shelby, and before that chief of staff to General John S. Marmaduke, judge adjutant general, and second in the Marmaduke-Walker duel.

In 1871, the Kansas City Times proclaimed itself, "the voice of the southern Democracy, and the latter-day champion of the unrepentant Confederacy".

William Rockhill Nelson bought the Times on October 19, 1901, mainly because he wanted its Associated Press wire. Nelson considered himself non-partisan, but had occasional progressive and southern Democratic leanings. He applied a subheading to the newspaper The Morning Kansas City Star and declared that The Kansas City Star was a 24-hour-a-day newspaper. In accordance with his will, employees took over the newspaper in 1926 upon the death of his daughter.

The Star and Times were locally owned by employees until 1977, when they were sold to Capital Cities. Under corporate ownership, The Times had higher circulation than its evening sister paper. Capital Cities made attempts to make the newsrooms appear to compete (though Kansas City did not have competing dailies after The Kansas City Journal folded in 1942).

The Times won its only Pulitzer Prizes in 1982. Rick Atkinson won an award for "National Reporting", and The Times shared an award with The Star for "Local General or Spot New Reporting" for its coverage of the Hyatt Regency walkway collapse.

On March 1, 1990, The Star (then under ownership of Capital Cities/ABC) applied its name to the morning paper and The Times name disappeared, meaning that Kansas City no longer had an afternoon daily.
