= Montana City, Colorado =

First settlement in what later became Denver, Colorado

Coordinates: 39°40′35.40″N 104°59′49.20″W

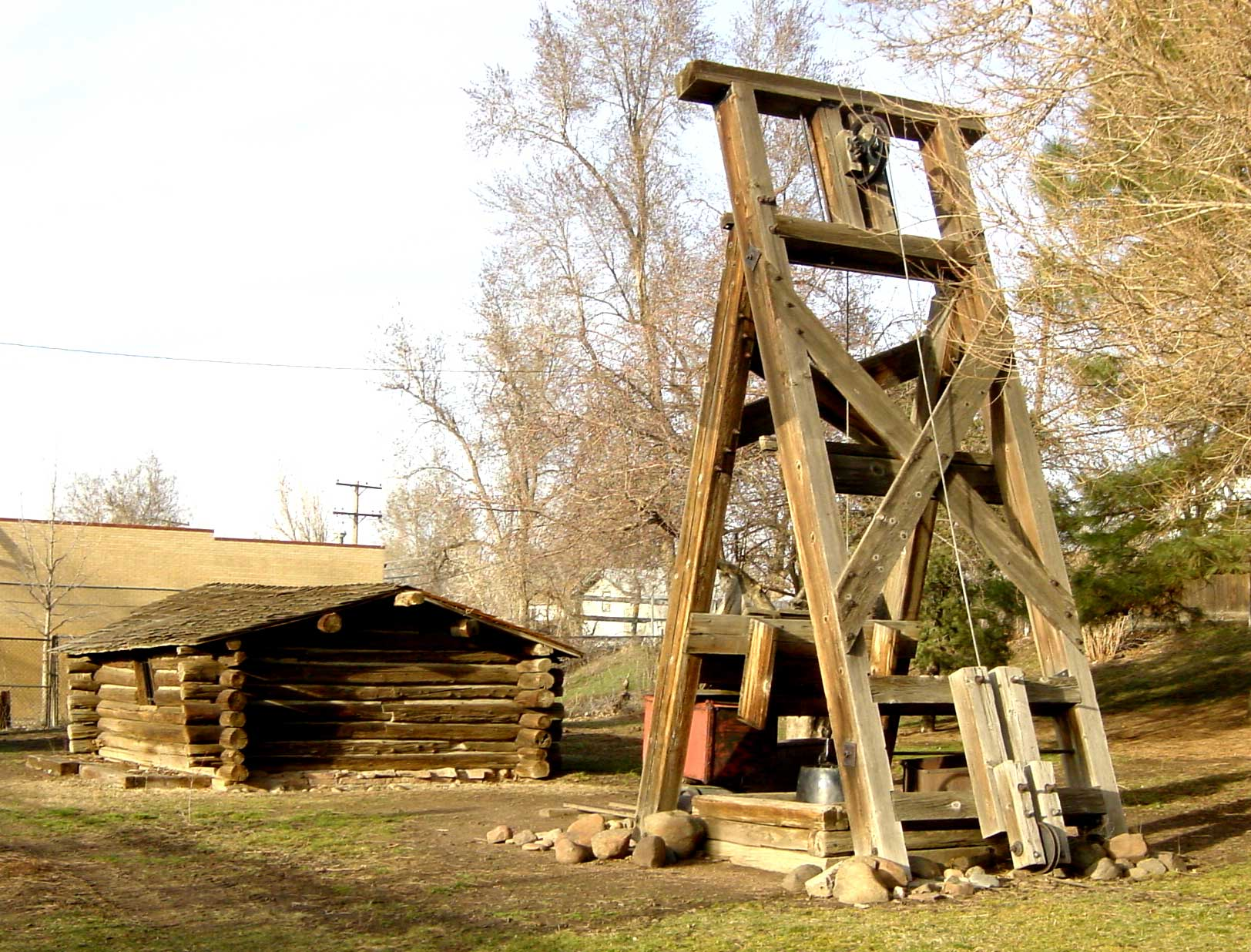
Reconstructed cabin and mine headframe at site of Montana City

Montana City was the first settlement in what was later to become Denver, Colorado. It was established during the Pikes Peak Gold Rush on the east bank of the South Platte River, just north of the confluence with Little Dry Creek, in 1858. At the time, the site was in the Kansas Territory.

The site selected because it was adjacent to placer gold diggings along the South Platte River. However, the gold diggings at Montana City proved disappointing, and the site was soon abandoned in favor of the settlement of Auraria, a few miles downstream.

The Montana City site is now Grant-Frontier Park and includes mining equipment and a log cabin replica.

== Lawrence Party ==
John Easter, a butcher living in Lawrence, Kansas, heard of gold found "two days sleep" from Pikes Peak from Fall Leaf in 1857. Fall Leaf was a member of the Delaware tribe living on a reservation near Lawrence, Kansas who met with Easter to negotiate the sale of a steer. Fall Leaf was a guide in 1857 for Major John Sedgwick’s cavalry unit to locate and attack the Cheyenne and Arapaho, in a series of attacks of retribution that stemmed from the killing of a Cheyenne warrior. That journey led the men along the Arkansas River, Fountain Creek and South Platte River. During that trip Fall Leaf found gold in the Pikes Peak area and showed a sample to Easter.

John Easter shared Fall Leaf’s account and determined that there was sufficient interest for the expedition to Colorado in search of gold, opportunities and adventure. The Lawrence party, as they were called, included about four dozen people, two of them were women and there was one child. Initially Fall Leaf agreed to lead the party, but plans changed and the group was led by J.H. Tierney. They left Lawrence, Kansas late May or the first of June, 1858. Captain of the night guards, George W. Smith, coordinated the rotating guard shifts among the men of the party. One man of the group had been to California where he learned to prospect and was a resource for the rest of the expedition. The group also included a surveyor to establish a new town for trading.

The expedition traveled from northeastern Kansas with eleven wagons along the Santa Fe Trail. They hunted buffalo as they traversed the great plains and paralleled the Arkansas River for much of their trip. During the journey a man became lost and after several days search assumed dead, but a few Cheyenne men arrived with a note that the man was two days journey ahead at a fort. (Note: Perhaps Fort Riley. Fort Larned, Fort Dodge and Fort Atkinson are further west of Great Bend, after the point of the journey where the fort is mentioned. (Holmes, p. 200).)

On June 28 the group arrived at the stone Bent’s Fort on the Arkansas River. After a stop, they continued northwest along the Arkansas until they reached the Fountaine qui Boille (Fountain River near present Pueblo). They followed the Fountain River in a northwesterly direction to Gardens of the Gods (present Colorado Springs) at the foot of Pikes Peak where they camped the remained of July and early August, 1858.

On the trip from Kansas were newlyweds twenty-year-old Julia Archibald Holmes and James H. Holmes. A personal friend of Susan B. Anthony, Julia was a feminist and abolitionist who wore a new costume of bloomers, baggy pants covered by a short calico skirt, which provided ease in walking not afforded by a long skirt. Julia said of the party’s reaction to her outfit: “However much it lacked in taste, I found it gave me freedom to roam at pleasure in search of flowers and other curiosities, while the cattle continued their slow and measured pace.” Coming into contact with members of Cheyenne and Arapaho tribes, Julia or her husband received offers for Julia, in one case John was asked to trade her for two Native American women. In her written accounts of the journey for her mother and an eastern feminist newspaper, The Sibyl, she described her unsuccessful attempt to share guard duty, the “large, finely formed, and noble looking” Cheyenne and Arapaho men, and her delight at reaching the 14,000 foot summit of Pikes Peak. Traveling with her husband, Julia was the first recorded European American woman to make it to the top. (Note: J.D. Miller and George Peck also climbed Pikes Peak, either with the Holmes or before them.)

After a month spent prospecting in the Pikes Peak and South Park areas, the group gave up on the idea of establishing a town near Garden of the Gods (present Old Colorado City district of Colorado Springs) and headed south towards New Mexico. While in the San Luis Valley they heard that gold had been discovered on the South Platte River at Dry Creek. Discussions about what to do next led to a fracturing of the group. Some followed the hope of finding gold in the South Platte River. Another group went to Fort Garland, between the sites of Alamosa and Walsenburg, to restock their supplies. Giving up the idea of prospecting for gold, others headed south to Taos, New Mexico. (Note: Holmes states that: The group found gold at Pikes Peak. Some of the group desired to stay and others decided to go to the Spanish Peaks and the group that Julie and James Holmes traveled with did not go north to Denver. (Holmes, p. 212.)) (Note: Robertson comments that some of the people returned to Kansas, some stayed in Colorado and the “Holmes party” went south to Taos and later Santa Fe.)

The remainder of the Lawrence party still interested in searching for gold and establishing a town headed north. Along the east side of the South Platte River, the group built rows of cabins, the definition of a town in the western frontier, and called it “Montana City”, Montana being the feminine form of “mountain”. The rows were named Leavenworth Row, Kansas Row and Lawrence Row. Although the area had been a frequent site where prospectors and trappers met and set up tents, the cabins were the first structures built in the Denver area. With Josiah Hinman as its president and William Boyer as it secretary, the group founded the “Montana Town Company”. John Easter was one of the men to build a cabin. Jason T. Younker, Howard Hunt, Charles Nichols and others were involved and promoted the town.

The South Platte did not yield gold and many of the remaining men from Kansas returned home. The cabins were dismantled and relocated to Auraria.

The abandoned Montana City location is now the site of the Grant-Frontier Park located on South Platte River Drive in Denver, just southwest of the intersection of Santa Fe Drive and W. Evans Avenue.

== Later years of some of the travelers ==
John Easter later moved to the Cripple Creek mining district, west of Colorado Springs.

John Holmes served under John Brown in battles contesting slavery. Julia, her husband and brother, eighteen-year-old Albert Archibald, headed south for New Mexico. Julia wrote for the New York Herald (Note: This was likely the New York Herald, since it was not renamed the New York Herald Tribune until 1924 and the Holmes had moved to Washington D.C. in 1870.) and James was appointed by President Abraham Lincoln to the position of Secretary of the New Mexico territory. The couple divorced and Julia worked in Washington, D.C. where she became the chief of the Bureau of Education, Division of Spanish Correspondence.

== See also ==
- Bibliography of Colorado
- Geography of Colorado
- History of Colorado
- Index of Colorado-related articles
- List of Colorado-related lists
  - List of ghost towns in Colorado
- Outline of Colorado

== Notes ==
Notes

Citations
