= Grant-Frontier Park =

Park and historical site in Denver, Colorado

Coordinates: 39.6740°N 104.9966°W

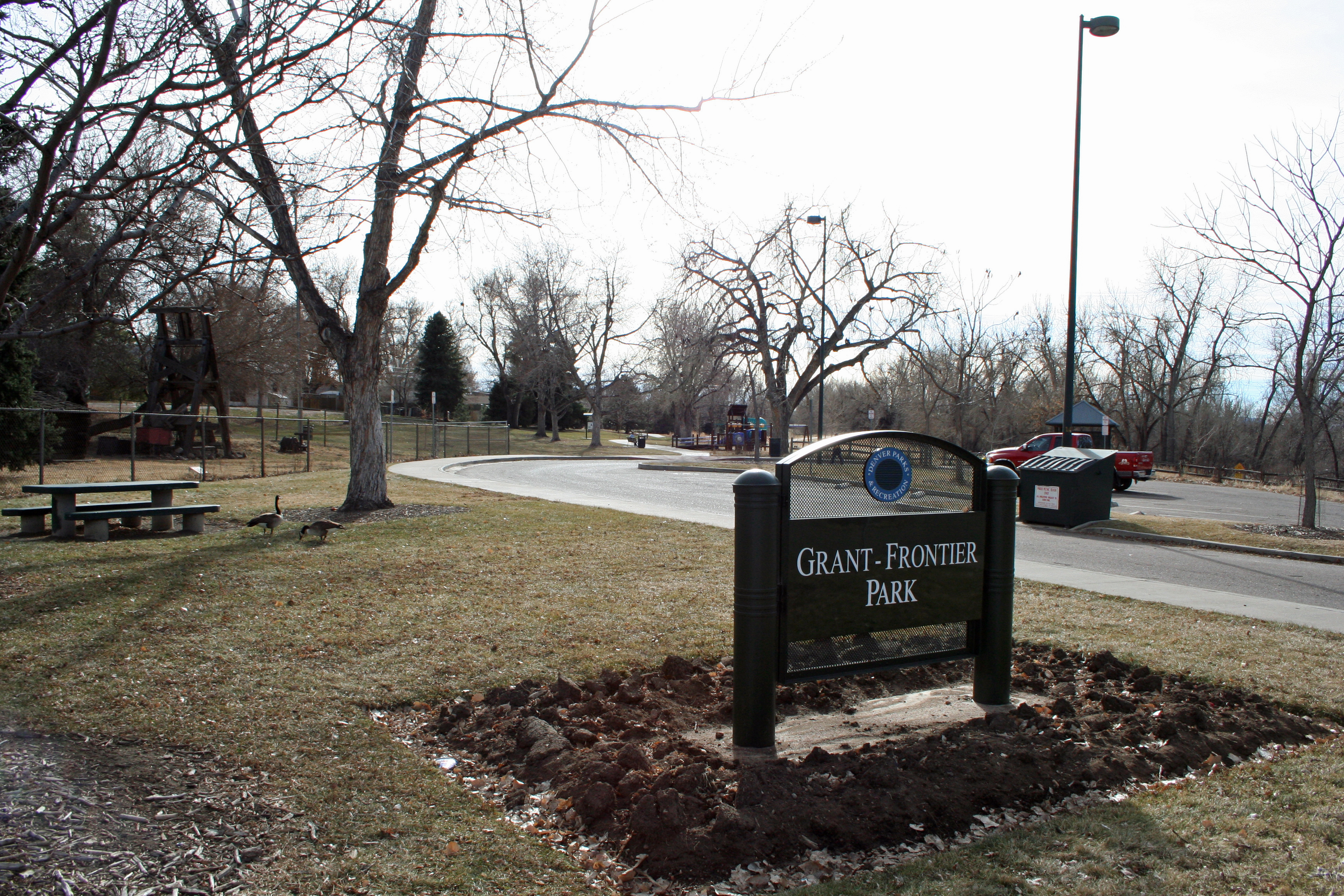
Grant-Frontier Park in Denver, Colorado.

Grant-Frontier Park is a park at Evans Ave. on the east bank of the South Platte River in southwest Denver, Colorado. It is the site of the Montana City settlement. The park was named in honor of Grant Junior High School (now Grant Middle School) whose teachers and students were responsible for discovering the site, cleaning and restoring it, and researching the history of Montana City.

The park features reconstructed and historical artifacts from the original 1858 settlement, the first in the Denver area. There is a log cabin with a sod roof, a conestoga wagon and some placer mining devices, like a sluice and rocker box.
