= Denver District Attorney's Office =

Responsible for the prosecution of state criminal violations

The Denver District Attorney's Office is responsible for the prosecution of state criminal violations in the Second Judicial District. Colorado has 64 counties within the 23 judicial districts in the State. The elected District Attorney is the chief law enforcement officer in the City and County of Denver, and is responsible for the prosecution of violations of Colorado State Laws. The current District Attorney is John Walsh, as of January 2025.

== History ==
Denver was originally a city within Arapahoe County until 1902 when the Homerule Amendment was passed by voters. This amendment to the Constitution of the State of Colorado, located in Article XX, gave limited home rule powers to incorporated Colorado cities of a certain size, enabling the creation of the City and County of Denver with its own separate judicial district.

The Denver District Attorney's Office has a storied history. One of Denver's first District Attorneys, Isaac Stevens, made a name for himself when he successfully prosecuted Dr. Thatcher Graves for poisoning a patient who was visiting Denver. She became ill and subsequently died after taking some medicine the doctor had mailed to her. Stevens later became editor and manager of the Colorado Springs Gazette in 1899, and eventually an author. His works include: The Liberators: A Story of Future American Politics (1908), An American Suffragette (1911) and What is Love? (1918).

Robert Wilbur Steele, a member of a prominent pioneer Colorado family, served as District Attorney from 1892 to 1894. Steele went on to a distinguished judicial career both as a Denver District Court judge as well as presiding judge of the Second Judicial District. He established a Juvenile Field Day at court, and his successor, Judge Ben B. Lindsey was known as the father of the juvenile court system, and cited Steele as an inspiration. Steele was later appointed Chief Justice of the Colorado Supreme Court.

Greeley Whitford, after serving as Denver District Attorney from 1895 to 1896, was appointed United States Attorney for Colorado by President William McKinley.

Ben Lindsley, Denver District Attorney from 1901 to 1904, has a small historical footnote based on a plan he pitched to the Denver Police Chief to rid Denver of Bat Masterson, one-time Sheriff of Arapahoe County, Colorado, after Masterson went on a drunken shooting spree. Masterson subsequently moved to New York City where he gained fame as a boxing promoter and star of dime store novels about western lawmen.

John Rush served as Denver District Attorney from 1913 to 1916, following his legislative service as a state senator. While serving as a senator, Rush helped pass the 1901 Homerule Amendment, an amendment to the Constitution of the State of Colorado, sometimes referred to as the "Rush Amendment" for his significant support. Attorney Horace G. Benson was elected after him.

Philip S. Van Cise was elected for one term in 1921. Known as "The Colonel", he used military tactics to bring down gangster Lou Blonger, "The Fixer", and his "Million Dollar Bunco Ring". Van Cise also took on the Ku Klux Klan at a time when Klan members included the Mayor of Denver and the Governor of Colorado. Van Cise prosecuted a number of high-profile criminals and exposed the underbelly of the Klan helping loosen the Klan's grip on political power but the fight didn't come cheaply. Van Cise's political career was short – he served only one term – and, his crusade almost cost him his life; he survived two attempts on his life. Van Cise's book Fighting the Underworld was reportedly used as source material for the motion picture The Sting.

John A. Carroll was elected Denver District Attorney in 1936 and served one four-year term. He was subsequently appointed to be the United States Attorney for Colorado and served in both the United States House of Representatives and United States Senate for Colorado.

Denver District Attorney Mike McKevitt, who gained a reputation for prosecuting "hippies" in the 1960s, was elected to the United States House of Representatives in 1970 but was defeated after one term. He went on to become an assistant United States attorney general, Office of Legislation, in 1973, and counsel for the Energy Policy Office in The White House from 1973 to 1974.
