= Daniel V. Maroney =

Daniel Vincent Maroney (June 10, 1921 – April 29, 1999) was an American labor union leader.

Born in Notomine, West Virginia, Maroney was educated at Beckley College and Morris Harvey College. He served with the United States Army during World War II, and again in the Korean War, receiving a Bronze Star. In 1947, he began working for the Charleston Transit Company, and joined the Amalgamated Transit Union (ATU). The following year, he moved to work for Atlantic Greyhound Lines. In 1954, he was elected as president of his local union, serving until 1965, when he was elected as a vice-president of the international union. During the 1960 United States presidential election, he was a prominent supporter of John F. Kennedy, and remained a friend of the Kennedy family for the rest of his life.

Maroney was elected as president of the ATU in 1973, and as a vice-president of the AFL-CIO in 1979. In 1981, he was defeated for re-election by John W. Rowland.

Trade union offices
Preceded by John M. Elliott	President of the Amalgamated Transit Union; 1973–1981	Succeeded by John W. Rowland
