= A. L. Spradling =

American labor union leader

Abraham Lincoln Spradling (June 19, 1885 – May 22, 1970) was an American labor union leader.

== Life ==
Born in Woodford County, Kentucky, Spradling became a driver for the Cincinnati Traction Company in 1903, and soon joined the Amalgamated Association of Street, Electric Railway and Motor Coach Employees of America. He was elected as secretary-treasurer of his union local in 1915, and then as a vice-president of the international union in 1927.

Spradling was elected to the union's executive board in 1935, and the following year became an assistant to the union's president, William D. Mahon. In 1946, he was elected as Mahon's successor. In 1955, he was additionally elected as a vice-president of the AFL-CIO. He also became a director of the Union Labor Life Insurance Company.

By the late 1950s, Spradling was in poor health, and this led him to retire in 1959. He died in Cincinnati, in 1970.

Trade union offices
Preceded by William D. Mahon	President of the Amalgamated Association of Street, Electric Railway and Motor Coach Employees of America; 1946–1959	Succeeded by John M. Elliott
