= John Costa =

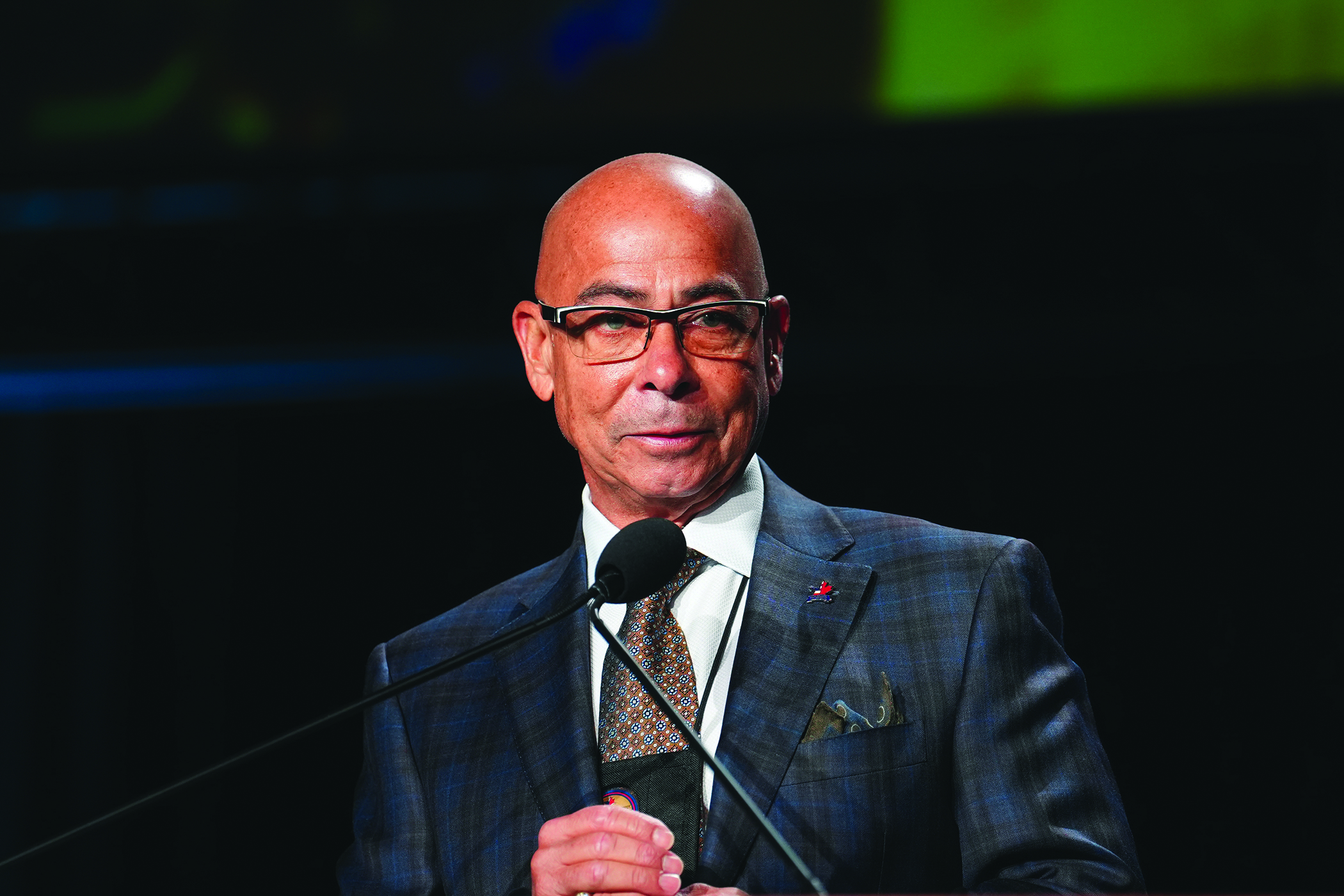
ATU International President John Costa

John A. Costa is an American labor union leader.

Born in Newark, New Jersey, Costa began working for NJ Transit in 1981, and joined the Amalgamated Transit Union. He held various posts in his local union, before in 2001 winning election as its president. In 2008 he became chair of the union's New Jersey State Council, and then in 2010 he won election as an international vice-president of the union. He became known for his bargaining skills, negotiating contracts across the United States.

Costa was appointed as president of the union in May 2019, and then won an election in September, to hold the post on an ongoing basis. He also serves as a vice-president of the AFL-CIO, and on the board of Jobs to Move America.

Trade union offices
Preceded by Larry Hanley	President of the Amalgamated Transit Union; 2019–present	Succeeded by Incumbent
