= Larry Hanley =

American bus driver and labor leader (1956-2019)

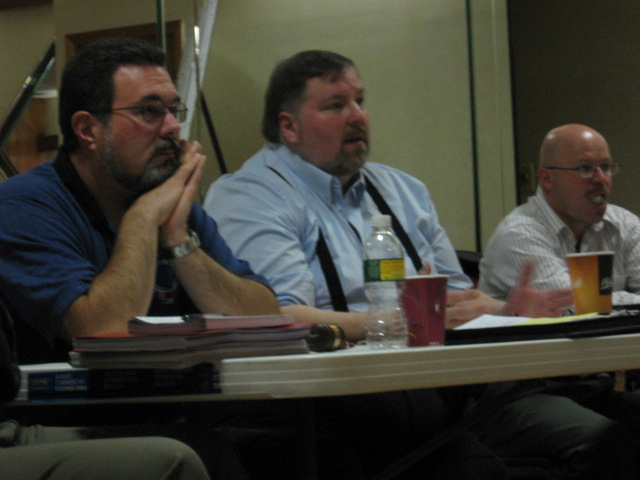
- Larry Hanley (center) in 2010 with Angelo Tanzi to his right
- Born: June 24, 1956; Queens, New York City, U.S.
- Died: May 7, 2019 (aged 62); Columbia, Maryland, U.S.
- Education: St. John's University, College of Staten Island
- Occupations: Union leader, former bus driver
- Spouse: Thelma Mayo
- Children: two

Lawrence Joseph Hanley (June 24, 1956 – May 7, 2019) was an American bus operator who eventually became International President of the Amalgamated Transit Union.

== Early life ==
Hanley was born on June 24, 1956, in Jamaica, Queens, NYC to James Emmet and Rose Margaret (Carey) Hanley, who were both auditors. He attended Xavier High School in Manhattan and Susan Wagner High School on Staten Island and studied at St. John's University and the College of Staten Island.

== Career ==
Hanley started working as a bus operator for the New York City Transit Authority in Brooklyn in 1978.

In 1984, Hanley was elected secretary-treasurer of Local 726. Three years later he was elected president, becoming the youngest person to do so. During his tenure, Hanley spearheaded many campaigns for the Local, one of which enabled a lower bus fare rate for the Express Bus Service on Staten Island. The successful campaign led to increased ridership of the Express Bus Service from Staten Island requiring additional drivers and buses.

In 2002, Hanley joined the international union's staff. He went on to become vice president of the International Amalgamated Transit Union. In 2010, he became President of ATU.

From 2010 until his death in 2019, he was international president of the Amalgamated Transit Union.

== Death ==
Hanley died on May 7, 2019, from pulmonary heart disease.

Trade union offices
Preceded by Warren S. George	President of the Amalgamated Transit Union; 2010–2019	Succeeded by John A. Costa
