= John M. Elliott (unionist) =

John M. Elliott (1913 – January 18, 1988) was an American labor union leader.

Elliott grew up in Philadelphia, where he became a truck driver, and an organizer for the International Brotherhood of Teamsters. He then moved to work on the city's streetcars, joining the Amalgamated Association of Street, Electric Railway and Motor Coach Employees of America, which he twice tried unsuccessfully to organize for the union.

In 1942, Elliott became financial secretary of his union local, and then president. He soon began working full-time for the international union as an organizer, and in 1948, he was elected as one of its vice-presidents. In 1955, he moved to Detroit to take up a post on the union's executive board, assisting president A. L. Spradling, and in 1957, he became executive vice president of the union.

In 1959, Elliott was elected as president of the union. Under his leadership, it moved from largely representing workers at small, local, private companies, to largely representing workers in larger, municipally owned transport systems. Elliott secured legislation to protect union members rights during the transition. He also led campaigns for exact fare schemes, which meant that drivers did not have to carry change, reducing the number of robberies they faced. He also promoted free public transport, and dial-a-bus schemes. In 1965, the union was renamed as the Amalgamated Transit Union.

In 1960, Elliott was elected as a director of the Union Labor Life Insurance Company. He also served on the executive board of the International Transport Workers' Federation from 1962, and that year, he was the AFL-CIO delegate to the British Trades Union Congress. In 1973, he was defeated for the union presidency by Daniel V. Maroney, and he then retired from the union movement.

Trade union offices
Preceded by Sam Berrong	Executive Vice President of the Amalgamated Association of Street, Electric Railway and Motor Coach Employees of America; 1957–1959	Succeeded by Henry Mann
Preceded by A. L. Spradling	President of the Amalgamated Transit Union; 1959–1973	Succeeded by Daniel V. Maroney
Preceded by Karl Feller; George McGregor Harrison	AFL-CIO delegate to the Trades Union Congress; 1962; With: Jack Knight	Succeeded by Anthony J. DeAndrade; William J. Farson
