= Horace G. Benson =

American criminal attorney (1863–1922)

The Honourable Horace G. Benson
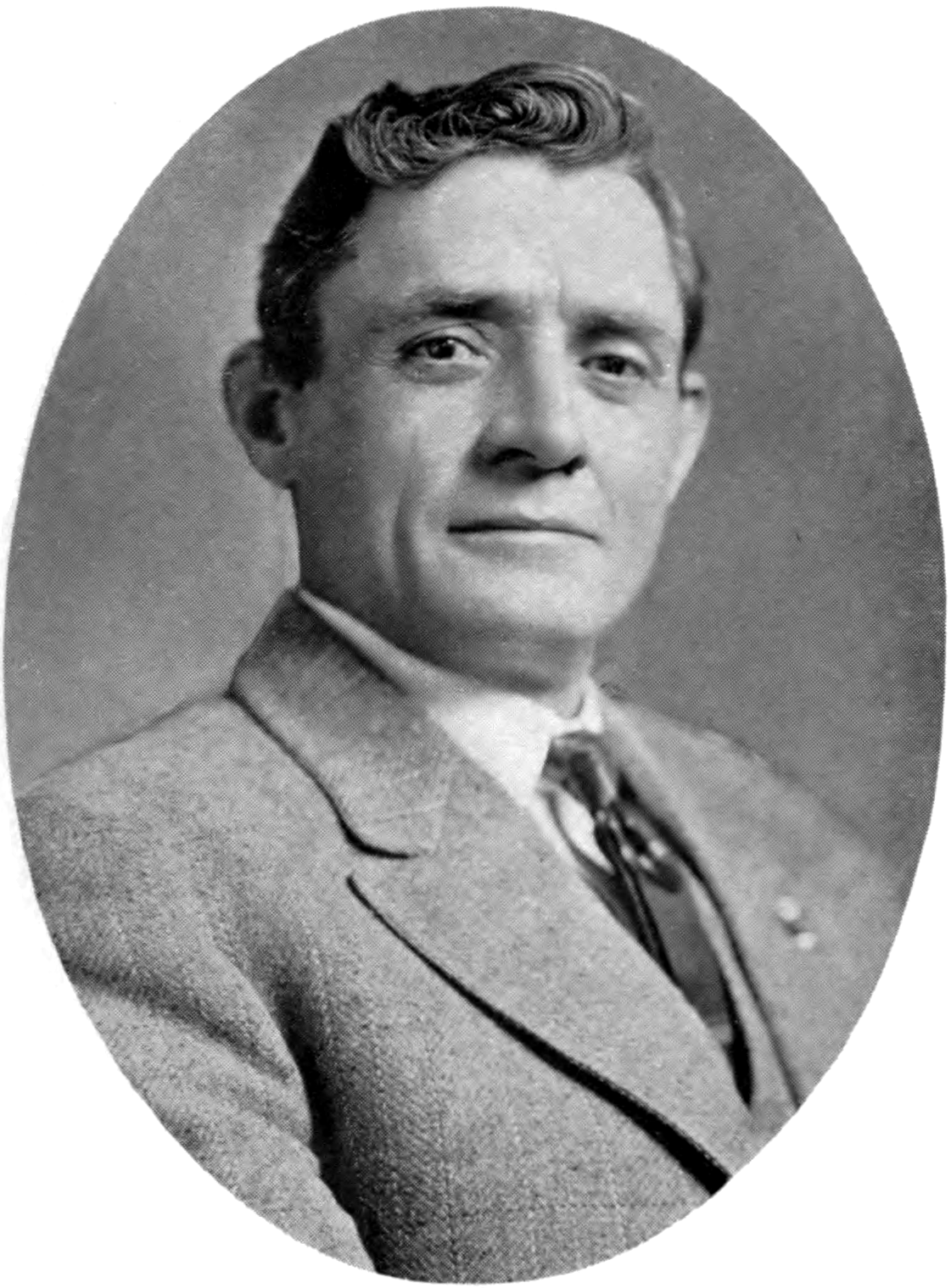
- Benson's portrait for the Colorado Bar Association
- Born: 1863; Atchison, Kansas, US
- Died: January 30, 1922 (aged 58); Denver, Colorado, US
- Occupation: Criminal attorney
- Political party: Republican

Horace G. Benson (1863 – January 30, 1922) was an American criminal attorney.

== Biography ==
Benson was born in Atchison, Kansas, in 1863, and was of English descent. His mother died at a young age, and he and his father moved to Colorado, living in Denver in 1872, Del Norte in 1874, and Placerville in 1876. He attended Colorado public schools. On October 24, 1884, he was admitted to the Colorado Bar Association.

As a lawyer, he prosecuted 31 murder cases, losing 6, and defended in 27 murder cases, losing 1. Notably, he defended Gertrude Gibson Patterson in the trial for her husband's murder; she was found not guilty. He served as a plaintiff in a corporate case in the Colorado Court of Appeals in 1914. He defended Italian immigrant Frank Eli in a robbery case in 1897; he was found not guilty.

In 1910, Benson ran as a Republican for Colorado Senate, getting 9.6% votes—13,881 votes—losing to William H. Sharpley. In 1916, he ran for the Denver District Attorney's Office, getting 37.9%—23,796 votes—winning the election.

Benson died on January 30, 1922, aged 58, in a hospital in Denver, of complications during abdominal surgery.
