= Amalgamated Transit Union =

North American trade union

- Abbreviation: ATU
- Formation: September 15, 1892; 134 years ago
- Type: Trade union
- Headquarters: Silver Spring, Maryland, US
- Locations: Canada; United States
- Members: 200,000 (2020)
- President: John A. Costa
- Secretary-treasurer: Kenneth R. Kirk
- Executive vice president: Yvette J. Trujillo
- Affiliations: AFL–CIO; Canadian Labour Congress; International Transport Workers' Federation
- Website: atu.org
- Formerly called: Amalgamated Association of Street Railway Employees of America; Amalgamated Association of Street, Electric Railway and Motor Coach Employees of America

The Amalgamated Transit Union (ATU) is a labor organization in the United States and Canada that represents employees in the public transit industry. Established in 1892 as the Amalgamated Association of Street Railway Employees of America, the union was centered primarily in the Eastern United States; as of 2020, ATU has had over 200,000 members throughout the United States and Canada.

== History ==
The union was founded in 1892 as the Amalgamated Association of Street Railway Employees of America. The union has its origins in a meeting of the American Federation of Labor in 1891 at which president Samuel Gompers was asked to invite the local street railway associations to form an international union. Gompers sent a letter to the local street railway unions in April 1892, and based on the positive response arranged for a convention of street railway workers. The convention began on September 12, 1892, in Indianapolis, Indiana, attended by fifty delegates from twenty-two locals. Many of the smaller unions were affiliated with the AFL, while four larger locals were affiliated with the Knights of Labor and two were independent.

The first president was William J. Law from the AFL-affiliated local in Detroit. Detroit was chosen as the headquarters, using the same facilities as the Detroit local. Because the number of members affiliated with the Knights of Labor was greater than the numbers affiliated with the AFL, according to the claims of the delegates, the new international remained unaffiliated despite pleas by Gompers. The objectives included education, settlement of disputes with management, and securing good pay and working conditions. The international was given considerable authority over the locals.

The second convention was held in Cleveland in October 1893, with just fifteen divisions represented by about twenty delegates. At this meeting William D. Mahon was named president, and he still held this position in 1937. By then the union had been renamed the Amalgamated Association of Street, Electric Railway and Motor Coach Employees of America. The union struggled in the early years as the transit companies followed the practice of firing union activists. In the 1897 meeting in Dayton, Ohio, there were twenty delegates. The treasury of the union now had $4,008. An early achievement was to have laws passed in a dozen states by 1899 that mandated enclosed vestibules for the motormen. Wages were close to $2 a day where the union was established, and in Detroit and Worcester the nine-hour day had been achieved, although in most cities ten- or eleven-hour days were common.

At the start of the 20th century the Amalgamated Association launched a militant organizing program. Although the union was always willing to arbitrate in disputes, there were many strikes against the streetcar companies. Often these turned violent, as in St. Louis in 1900 or Denver in 1920. The public and small businesses sympathized with the strikers, and passengers and other unions often became involved in the street actions. When buses began to replace streetcars, the association began to be challenged by the International Brotherhood of Teamsters, Chauffeurs, Stablemen and Helpers. It was agreed that the Amalgamated Association would have jurisdiction over buses operated by street railway companies, while the Teamsters would have jurisdiction over independent bus lines and over road transportation of goods.

== Political and legislative activities ==
In 2008, the Amalgamated Transit Union (ATU) endorsed Hillary Clinton in her unsuccessful bid for the Democratic presidential nomination; after she conceded defeat, the ATU endorsed Barack Obama in his bid to become president.

In 2025, the Amalgamated Transit Union (ATU) Local 726 endorsed Andrew Cuomo for mayor of New York.

The ATU was named the "Most Valuable National Union" in The Nation magazine's Progressive Honor Roll of 2012 for its support of the Occupy movement, the National Day of Action for Public Transportation, and other social justice issues.

== Timeline ==
Year	Location	
1892	Indianapolis	Amalgamated Association of Street Railway Employees of America is founded in September 1892
1900	St. Louis	St. Louis Streetcar Strike of 1900
1903		As electrically powered streetcars became more common, the name was changed to the Amalgamated Association of Street and Electric Railway Employees of America.
1908	Chicago	Chicago Tunnel Company refuses to recognize the Amalgamated Association. On May 9 all workers go on strike. Company uses strikebreakers to break the strike.
1909	Omaha	An attempt to organize Omaha streetcar workers fails when armed strikebreakers are brought in.
1910	Philadelphia	The streetcar union launches a strike in February 1910. Violence erupts, and the strike escalates into a general strike of unions in all industries on March 4, involving about 100,000 workers. After three weeks the Philadelphia Rapid Transit Company agrees to negotiate.
1912	Boston	Boston streetcar workers go on strike. After two months they gain the right to form a trade union, and a system of arbitration for future disputes is agreed upon. President Mahon cedes jurisdiction over carpenters, painters, electricians, and other skilled trades to the AFL. The union's membership is divided into 34 distinct labor units, each with a separate agreement negotiated with the company's representative Cyrus S. Ching.
1913	Indianapolis	Indianapolis Streetcar Strike of 1913 starts on October 31. After rioting, the Indiana National Guard is brought in and the city placed under martial law on November 5. As a result, Indiana enacts laws that set minimum wages, regular hours and workplace improvements.
1916	Washington, D.C.	Workers on streetcars in Washington, D.C. are organized when local 689 of the Amalgamated Association wins recognition after a three-day strike.
1917	Bloomington, Illinois	1917 Bloomington Streetcar Strike: A general strike in Bloomington occurred, by both the ATU local 752 transit workers and sympathy strikers that made up the vast majority of the town's workers.
1917	Minneapolis-Saint Paul	1917 Twin Cities streetcar strike: Efforts to organize workers of the Twin City Rapid Transit Company fail after several instances of rioting. Workers later unionized in 1934.
1920	Denver	1920 Denver streetcar strike: Workers on the Denver Tramway strike in response to threats of a wage cut. Company hired strikebreakers. City organizes a citizen militia, and later called for Federal troops. Local 746 dissolved, the city would not have a transport union for 13 years.
1934	Los Angeles	Amalgamated workers at the Los Angeles Railway strike in response to a refusal to raise wages. Approximately 1/8th of the railway employees joined the strike and were subsequently fired.
1935	Omaha	On April 20, 1935, a long and violent strike begins in Omaha, but is not successful.
1936	New York City	Negotiations for the Transport Workers Union to join the Amalgamated Association break down.
1944	Philadelphia	Despite opposition from the union, white workers walk out from August 1–8 in the Philadelphia transit strike of 1944 in an attempt to block giving non-menial jobs to black workers. Troops are brought in and the workers return to work having failed to achieve their goal.
1947	Cornwall, Ontario	Workers at the Cornwall Street Railway strike repeatedly for wage increases throughout August and September in a dispute which is only ended through mediation from Ontario Minister of Labour Charles Daley.
1964		Name is changed to Amalgamated Transit Union
1966	New York City	In the 1966 New York City transit strike, the TWU and the ATU both strike against the New York City Transit Authority. The ATU represents 1,750 bus employees in Queens and Staten Island, while the TWU represents 33,000 transit employees. The 12-day strike leads to passage of the Taylor Law, redefining the rights and limitations of unions for public employees in New York.
1983		Greyhound faces growing competition and is forced to drop its fares. To survive, it requests a 9.5% wage cut, which the union rejects. In November 1983 the ATU calls a strike of Greyhound employees, with 12,700 members walking off the job. The union accepts a 7.8% wage cut on December 19, 1983, just before Christmas.
1990		A second Greyhound strike begins in March 1990. Over 9,000 union members lost their jobs when Greyhound hired an army of replacements. One striker was killed when struck by a bus driven by a strikebreaker. The strike drags on and many drivers return to work. The ATU let its members return in 1993.
2006	Toronto	2006 Toronto Transit Commission wildcat strike
2008	Toronto	The 2008 Toronto Transit Commission strike is called at 90 minutes notice and commenced on April 26, 2008, at 12:01 a.m. Emergency legislation is passed over the weekend to force the strikers back to work.
2024	Toronto	A TTC strike was set to commence on June 7, 2024, at 12:01 a.m. if a deal between the TTC and the Amalgamated Transit Union Local 113 was not reached. In April, union members had voted overwhelmingly in favor of strike action if necessary, after their previous collective agreement expired at the end of March. However, the TTC and the union reached a tentative agreement at approximately 11:30 p.m. on June 6, 2024, and so the strike was averted. The key issues for the union and its members related to job security, protections against contracting out jobs, and improvements in benefits for active members and pensioners. The President of Local 113, Marvin Alfred, confirmed Friday morning that a tentative agreement had been reached late Thursday and that talks had continued until almost 4 a.m. "What we have right now is a deal," he said. "We have something signed, but we're still preparing and making sure we can have something tangible for our membership," he told CBC Radio's Metro Morning on Friday. In 2023, an Ontario Superior Court judge ruled that a 2011 law that forbade TTC workers from striking was unconstitutional, and that decision was upheld by the Ontario Court of Appeal in May 2024.
2025	Santa Clara County, CA	A Local 265 chapter strike started on Monday March 10, 2025 at 12:01 a.m. against the Santa Clara Valley Transit Authority (VTA) due to an inability to agree on a new contract. The strike lasted 17 days until Wednesday March 26, 2025 when a local judge issued a preliminary injunction thus compelling the workers to return to work.

== Leadership ==
=== Presidents ===
1893: William D. Mahon
1946: A. L. Spradling
1959: John M. Elliott
1973: Daniel V. Maroney
1981: John W. Rowland
1985: Jim La Sala
2003: Warren S. George
2010: Larry Hanley
2019: John Costa

=== Secretary-Treasurers ===
1892: J. C. Manual
1893: S. M. Massey
1894: M. G. Moore
1895: James G. Grant
1895: Rezin Orr
1917: L. D. Bland
1934: William Taber
1946: Rip Mischo
1968: James J. Hill
1974: John Rowland
1976: Raymond C. Wallace
1989: Oliver W. Green
2001: Oscar Owens
2019: Kenneth R. Kirk
