= Colorado Rangers =

State law enforcement agency in the US

- Ranger Badge
- Common name: Colorado Rangers Law Enforcement Shared Reserve
- Abbreviation: CLER
- Motto: Serving & Protecting Colorado Since 1861

Agency overview
- Formed: 2017
- Preceding agencies: Colorado Department of Safety (Colorado Rangers) (1861–1927); Colorado Mounted Rangers (1941–2018)

Jurisdictional structure
- Operations jurisdiction: Colorado, United States
- Map of Colorado
- Area: 104,185 square miles (269,840 km^{2})
- Population: 5,812,069 (2021 est.)
- General nature: Civilian police

Operational structure
- Headquarters: 330 Park Ave, Fort Lupton, CO 80621
- Agency executive: Colonel Ronald M Abramson, Chief

Website
- coloradorangers.gov

The Colorado Rangers Law Enforcement Shared Reserve (CLER), known publicly as the Colorado Rangers, is a statewide police agency in the U.S. state of Colorado. It is a statewide law enforcement reserve of sworn POST-certified peace officers who serve as force multipliers, allowing Colorado law enforcement agencies to reduce costs and manpower through a shared force. It is the only such statewide police reserve force in the United States. The Colorado Rangers have existed in some capacity since Colorado Territory's formation in 1861, though the modern agency was formed in 2017 from the Colorado Mounted Rangers.

== History ==
Organized before the Colorado Territory was recognized as a state, the Colorado Rangers continue to serve as the oldest statewide law enforcement agency in Colorado.

The Colorado Rangers were founded in 1861 as state officers which served to keep the peace and to guard gold and silver shipments from Colorado mines. Governor William E. Sweet signed an executive order on January 29, 1923, cutting off funding in order to prevent political use of the officers involvement with labor disputes and to weaken prohibition enforcement. On April 1, 1927 Governor Billy Adams fulfilled a campaign promise to repeal the Department of Safety Act, officially disbanding the Colorado Rangers and with it, all statewide law enforcement in Colorado. The Colorado Rangers were subsequently reorganized as the Colorado Mounted Rangers and remained a statutory auxiliary until reorganization as a statewide shared reserve.

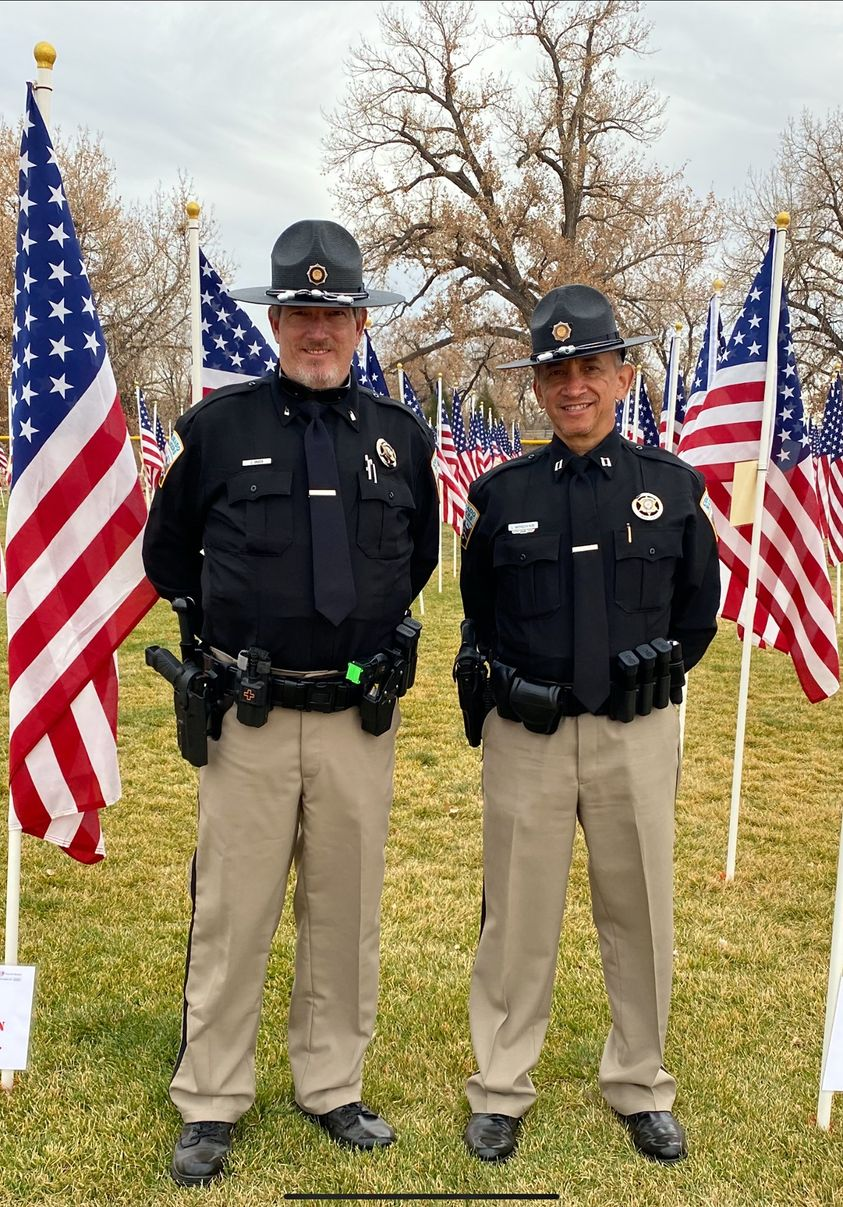
Colorado Rangers with an array of American flags.

=== Organization as a statewide shared reserve police force ===
Colorado's concept of sharing a statewide police reserve is the first ever implemented in the United States. The agency was created pursuant the recommendations of a task force enacted in 2016 by the Colorado Legislature that was delegated to study the Peace Officer Certification and Authority of the Colorado Mounted Rangers. The task force was mandated by state statute to include the Colorado Attorney General, a county sheriff, the Chief of the Colorado State Patrol, the Director of the Colorado Bureau of Investigation, the Director of the Colorado Division of Homeland Security and Emergency Management, and the Colonel of the Colorado Mounted Rangers.

This Task Force studied the functionality of the Colorado Mounted Rangers while assessing the needs of law enforcement throughout the state. Members of the task force saw a need for creating a governmental structure that could support a viable law enforcement reserve agency. The agency needed to be prepared to serve as a supplement to any size police agency, be widely available throughout the state, and available on a 24/7 basis. The idea of sharing a reserve police force would create predictability and allow for useful planning and budgeting by partner agencies. Partner agencies would each pay budgeted amounts annually into the new agency that would fund proper training and management of the Colorado Rangers. The concept was a winning formula for agencies which allowed them to retire less functional police and sheriff reserve programs and created access to uniformly trained police officers on an as needed basis. The idea of sharing resources beyond local jurisdiction limits reduced duplicative administrative costs and potential liabilities that exist with locally managed reserve programs.

In 2017, several municipalities worked together to create an intergovernmental agreement that established an independent local government named the Colorado Rangers Law Enforcement Shared Reserve (CLER) that would assume the public title of Colorado Rangers. The governmental entity was designed specifically to provide Colorado P.O.S.T. certified reserve police officers to agencies throughout the state, which significantly expanded the supportive law enforcement role of the Colorado Mounted Rangers and transformed it back into a fully authorized police agency that is capable of being seamlessly integrated with police agencies that have temporary personnel needs.

As part of the reorganization, the Colorado Mounted Rangers would retire its statutory law enforcement auxiliary and transition their officers into the Colorado Rangers Law Enforcement Shared Reserve. Rangers who were serving at the time were invited to complete Colorado P.O.S.T. approved police reserve academies tuition-free, funded by an initial $800,000 grant from the state of Colorado. Those officers that passed the stringent training requirements were allowed to join the new Colorado Rangers entity as certified peace officers. The Colorado Mounted Rangers officially ceased its operational law enforcement auxiliary function on July 15, 2018, the organization continues to exist as a nonprofit 501(c)(3) that provides foundational fundraising support for the Colorado Rangers. All references to the Colorado Mounted Rangers were updated in Colorado law (Colorado Revised Statutes) to reflect the appropriate name of Colorado Rangers in March 2025. In an extraordinary show of support to the Colorado Rangers and their service to the State of Colorado, the bill updating statute was passed by the Colorado General Assembly with 100% support in both the Senate and the House of Representatives before being signed by the Governor.

The statewide shared reserve is overseen by an appointed Board of Governors whose members are appropriate and qualified for law enforcement oversight and administration guidance. A police command structure would be established for agency administration, all sworn personnel would be required to obtain P.O.S.T certification, and officers would be granted peace officer status and authority while on duty.

The success of Colorado's shared reserve system has garnered attention from other states who are also considering consolidating resources to allow for more effective and manageable reserve programs. Police agencies have experienced significant costs increases to train, equip, insure, and maintain personnel. Modern policing has become an expensive technological career requiring computers, body-warn cameras, encrypted radio equipment, etc. where equipping and training a single officer (full time or reserve) typically costs an agency between $30,000 and $65,000. Shared Reserve Programs will provide agencies an opportunity to mitigate rising costs as well by sharing the costs of hiring and maintaining professional part-time and at-need staffing.

== Present day ==
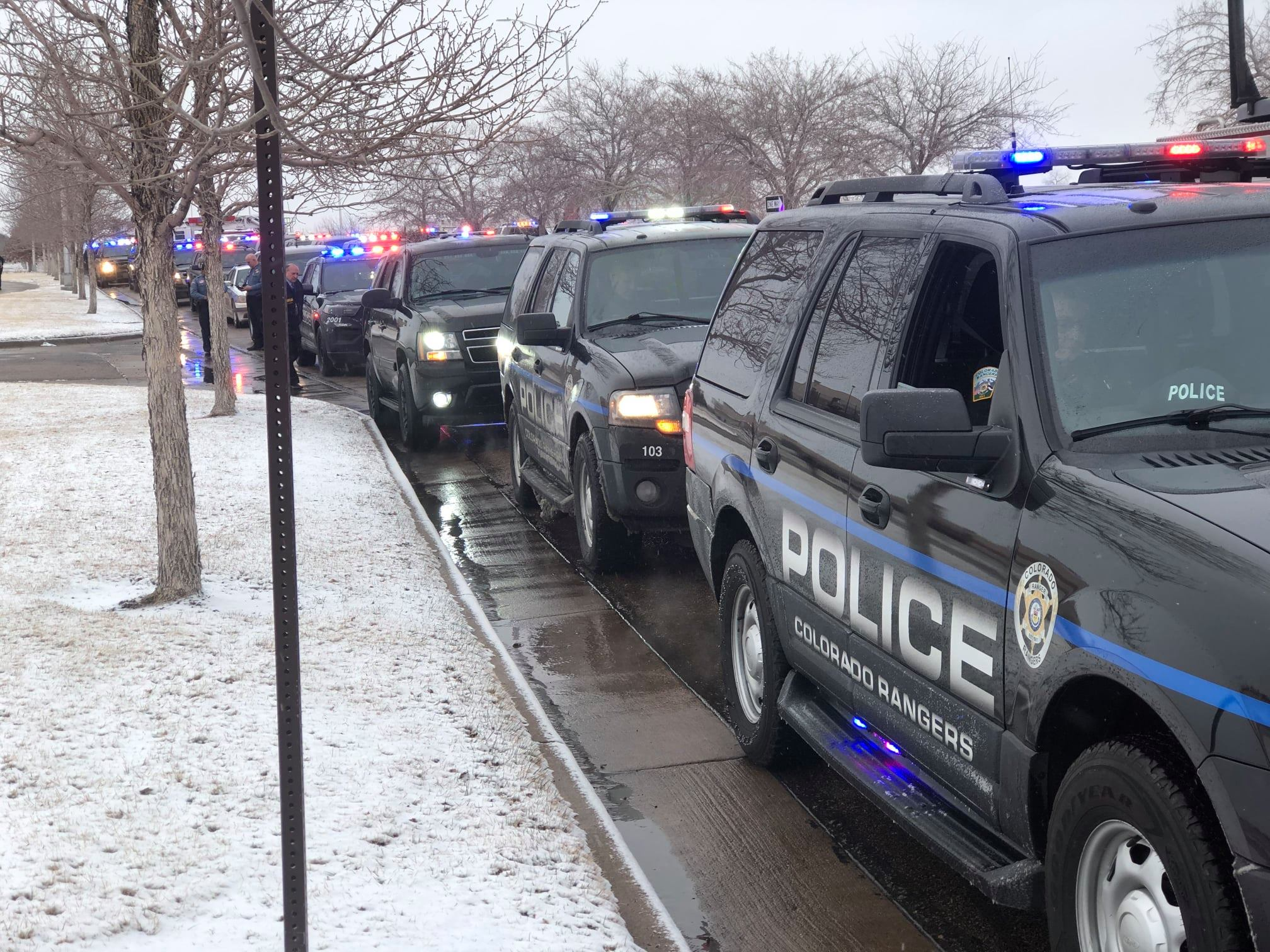
Colorado Ranger patrol vehicles.

The Colorado Rangers provide highly trained, equipped, and experienced personnel to local law enforcement agencies throughout Colorado. Rangers serve the agency without pay and purchase most of their own uniforms and other equipment designated by the agency. Officers of the Colorado Rangers are required to attend P.O.S.T. certified police academies and hold a certification at minimum of Reserve Police Officer. Many of the Rangers who serve, are former full-time or retired police officers who have maintained their training and certification as peace officers. The agency has attracted a unique mix of officers not typically found in a local police force who have full-time careers as doctors, lawyers, CEOs, engineers, military, I.T. professionals, politicians, etc. who also serve throughout the state as police officers.

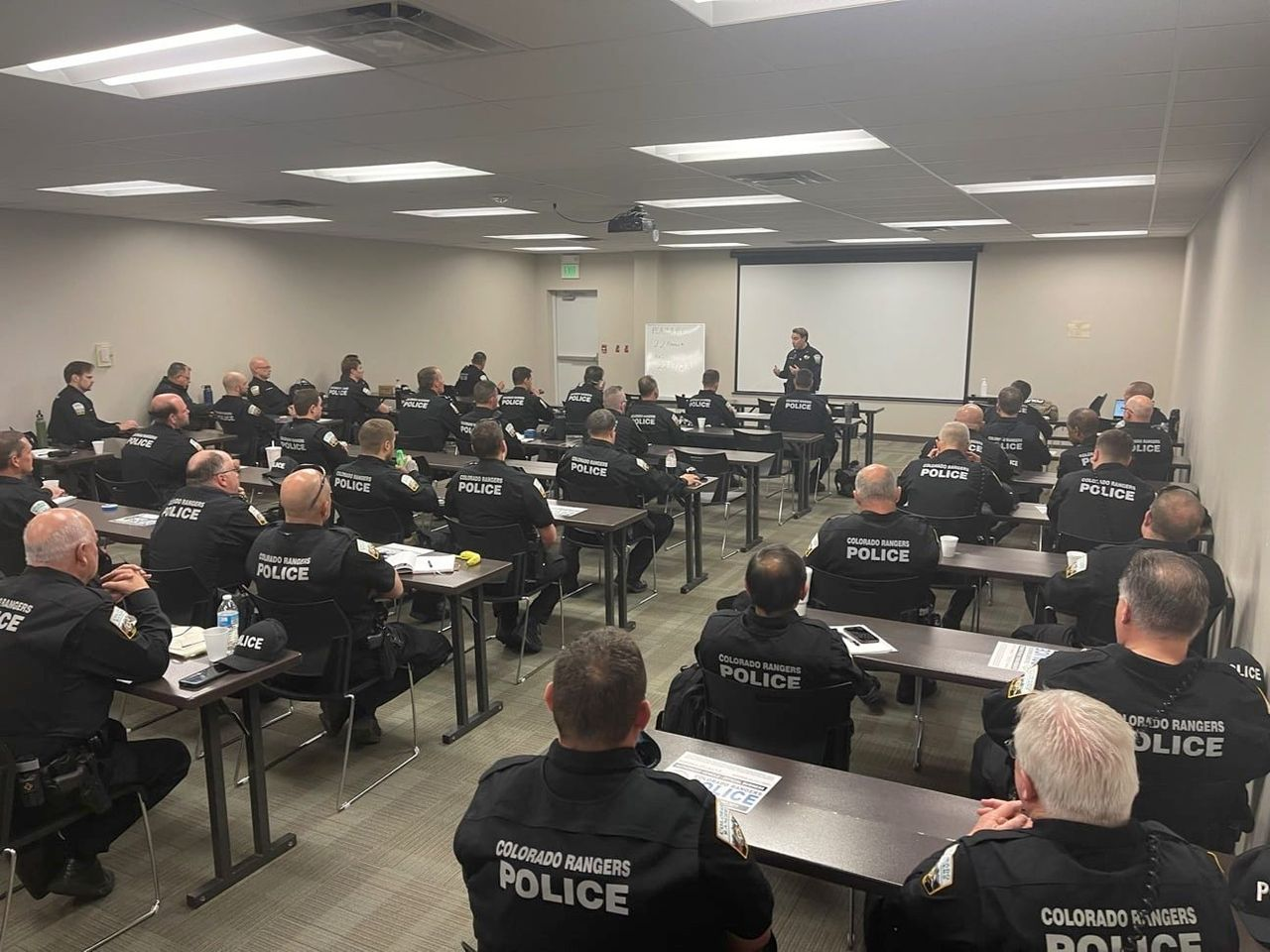
A Colorado Ranger meeting at HRLETF.

The function of the agency is to provide its services with minimal financial obligation for partner agencies. Rangers assist with special events, respond to local emergencies, aid in arrests, and provide patrol services when full-time personnel are unavailable. All officers are fully trained reserve police officers, and many Rangers have advanced and specialty law enforcement training. The agency also maintains a statistically high number of police instructors per capita within their ranks.

Officers typically sign up for duty shifts and serve on pre-planned "callouts" with partner police agencies. Rangers are required to maintain certain availability for "on-call" status to respond to emergencies. The agency has the unique ability to mobilize a large, fully equipped, police presence anywhere in the state with little notice. Rangers are typically required to serve a minimum of 150 hours of "shift duty" each year in addition to approximately 100 additional hours each year of training. The agency typically covers the cost of training and provides required insurance. The sworn staff of the Colorado Rangers collectively serve approximately 23,833 hours each year, saving partner agencies approximately $738,823 in overtime and personnel costs annually. Colorado's shared reserve model has proven to be an excellent fiscal model for part-time or temporary policing.

=== Impact on the community ===
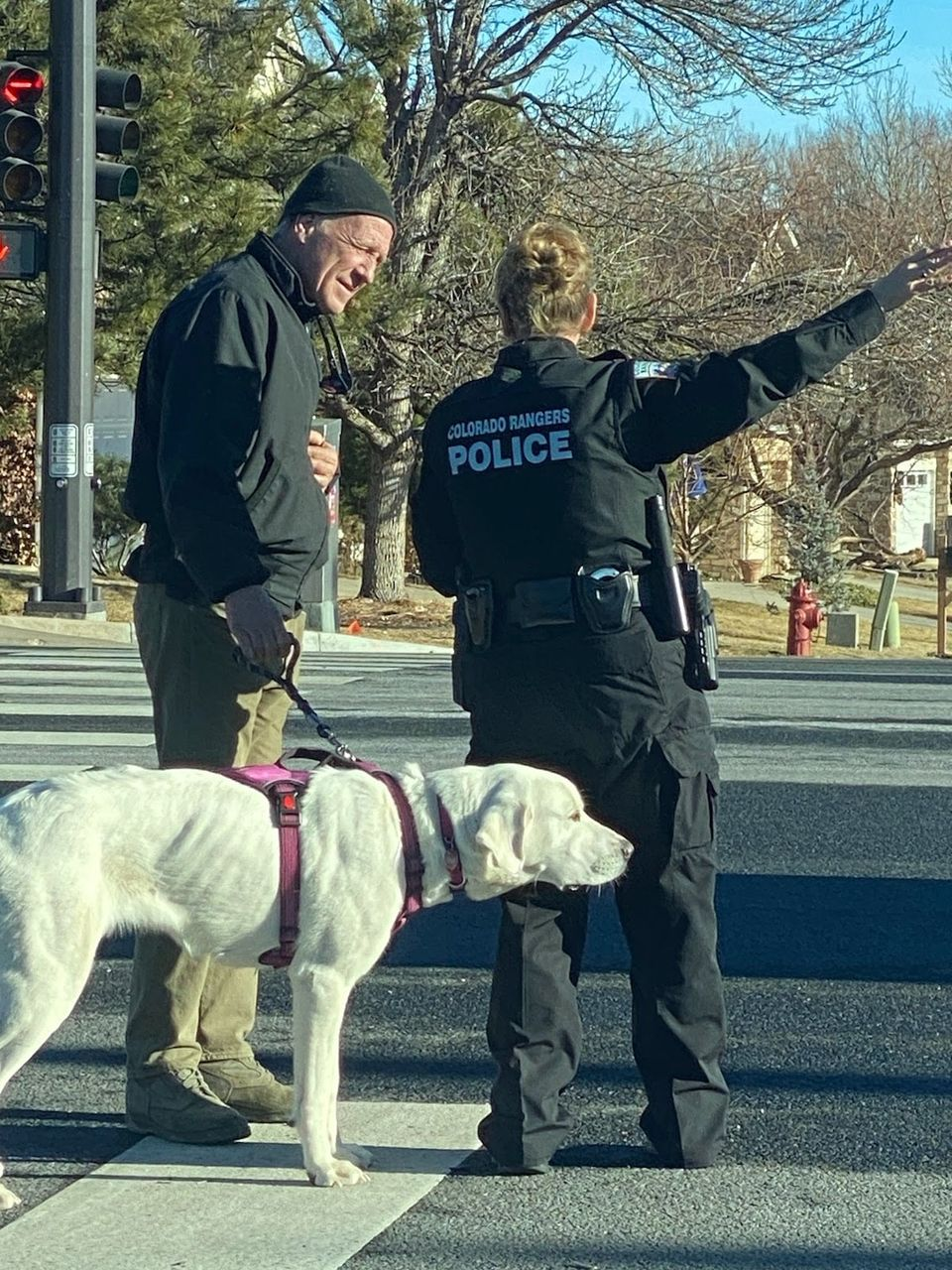
Colorado Ranger interacting with the public.

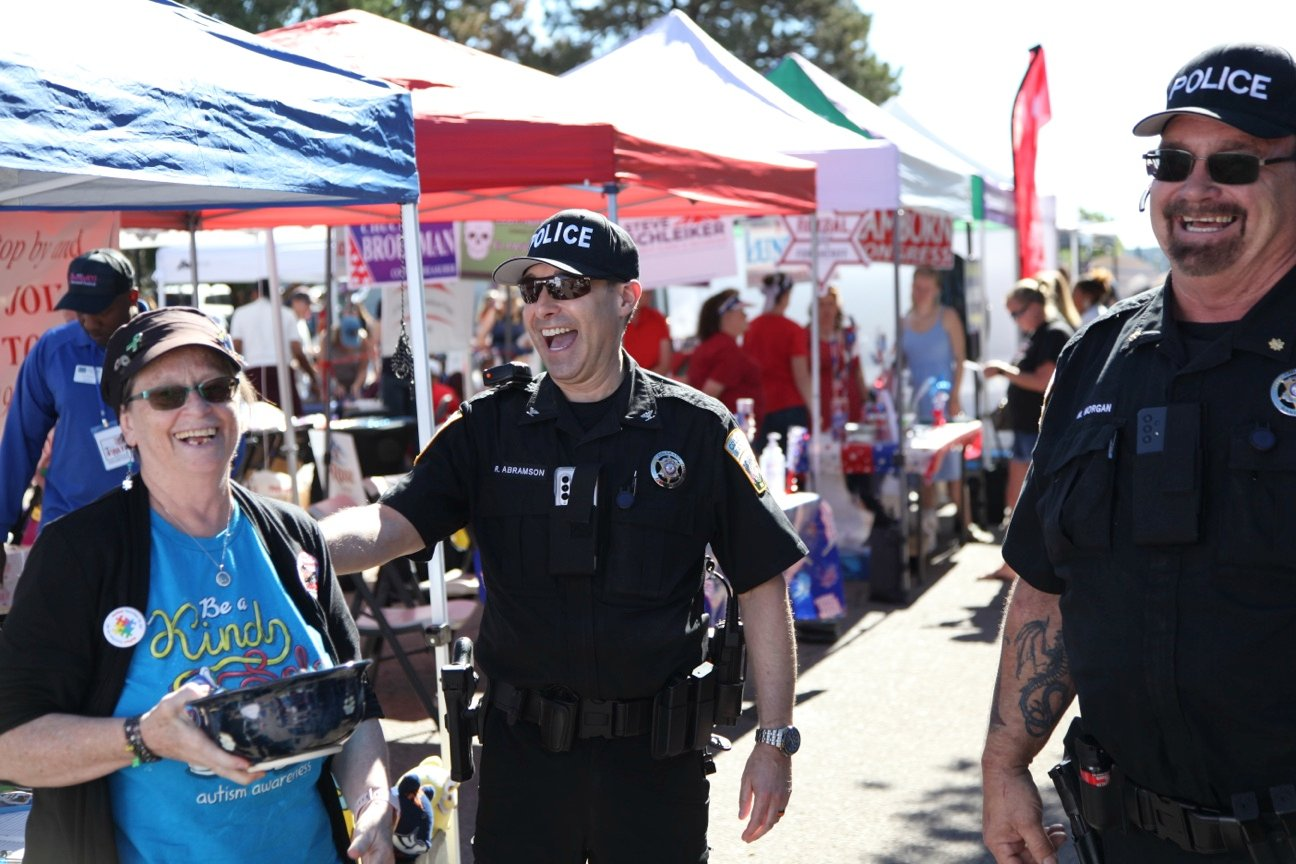
Colorado Rangers at a farmers' market.

The Colorado Rangers Law Enforcement Shared Reserve function with partner law enforcement and governmental entities through formal mutual aid agreements and have police officer staffing services available directly to agencies throughout the state. This functionality drastically reduces the cost for maintaining separate local reserve programs for each agency. Sharing this resource affords a higher level of training for each officer, and provides access to more experienced officers and specialties that wouldn't be possible to maintain for each individual agency.

Many smaller communities rely on policing manpower and expertise the Rangers provide for events that would overwhelm the budget and personnel capacity of local police and sheriff departments. Access to officers from the shared reserve allows smaller communities to have large events that bring an influx of people into their communities that require expanded policing. Rangers are often seen at fairs, festivals, concerts, parades, and events and the officers have developed a unique expertise in managing large event traffic and crowds. Rangers are considered experts by smaller agencies who don't routinely handle events with large crowds. The agency also provides police officers for special operations, DUI enforcement, searches, patrol, courtroom security, emergency events, and other personnel needs that are requested by partner agencies.

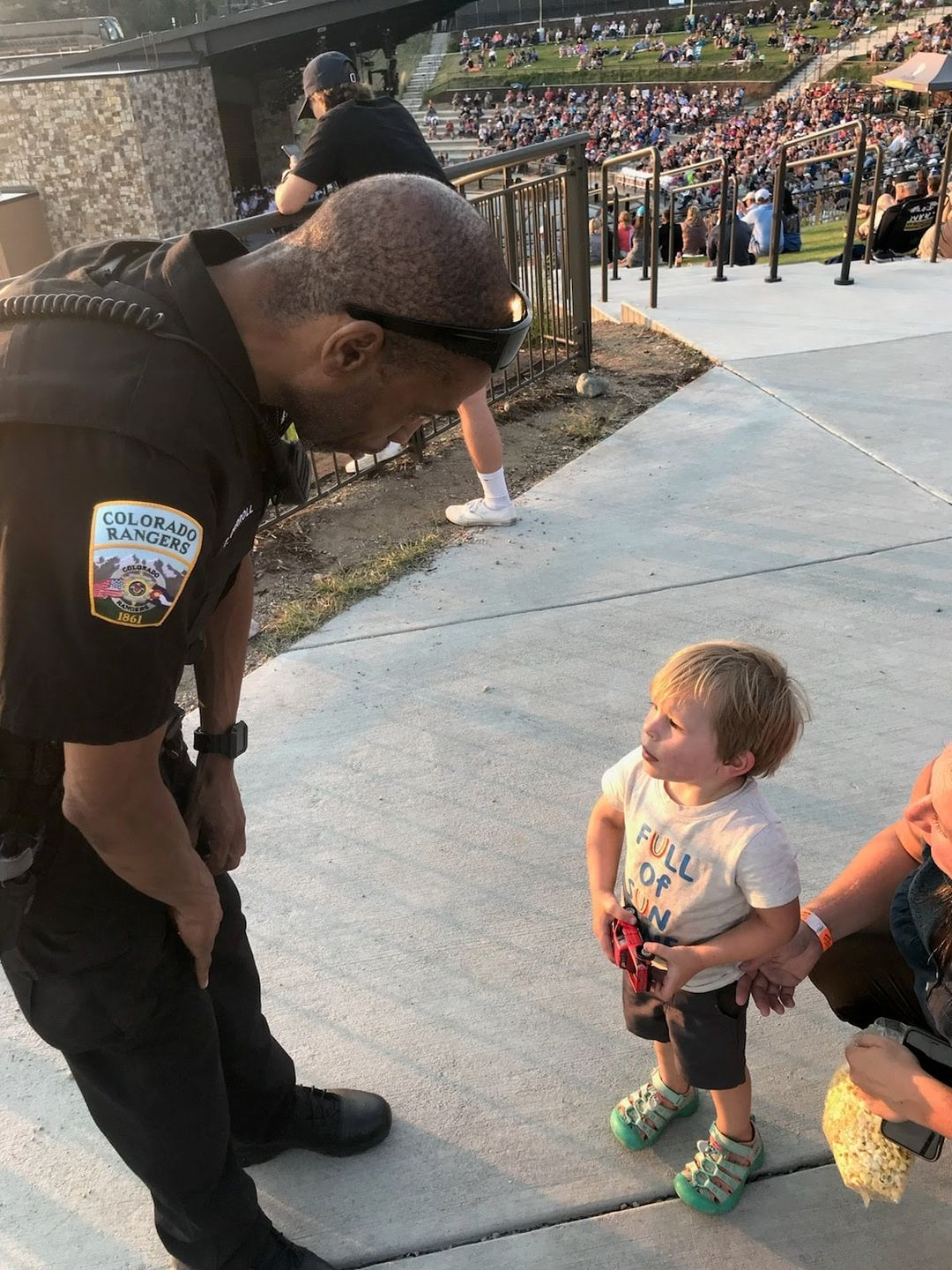
Ranger with a lost child.

The Rangers supplement agencies of varied size: small town police departments may need patrol officers for gaps in coverage and large agencies such as Denver Police Department rely upon the Colorado Rangers for a wide variety of policing functions.

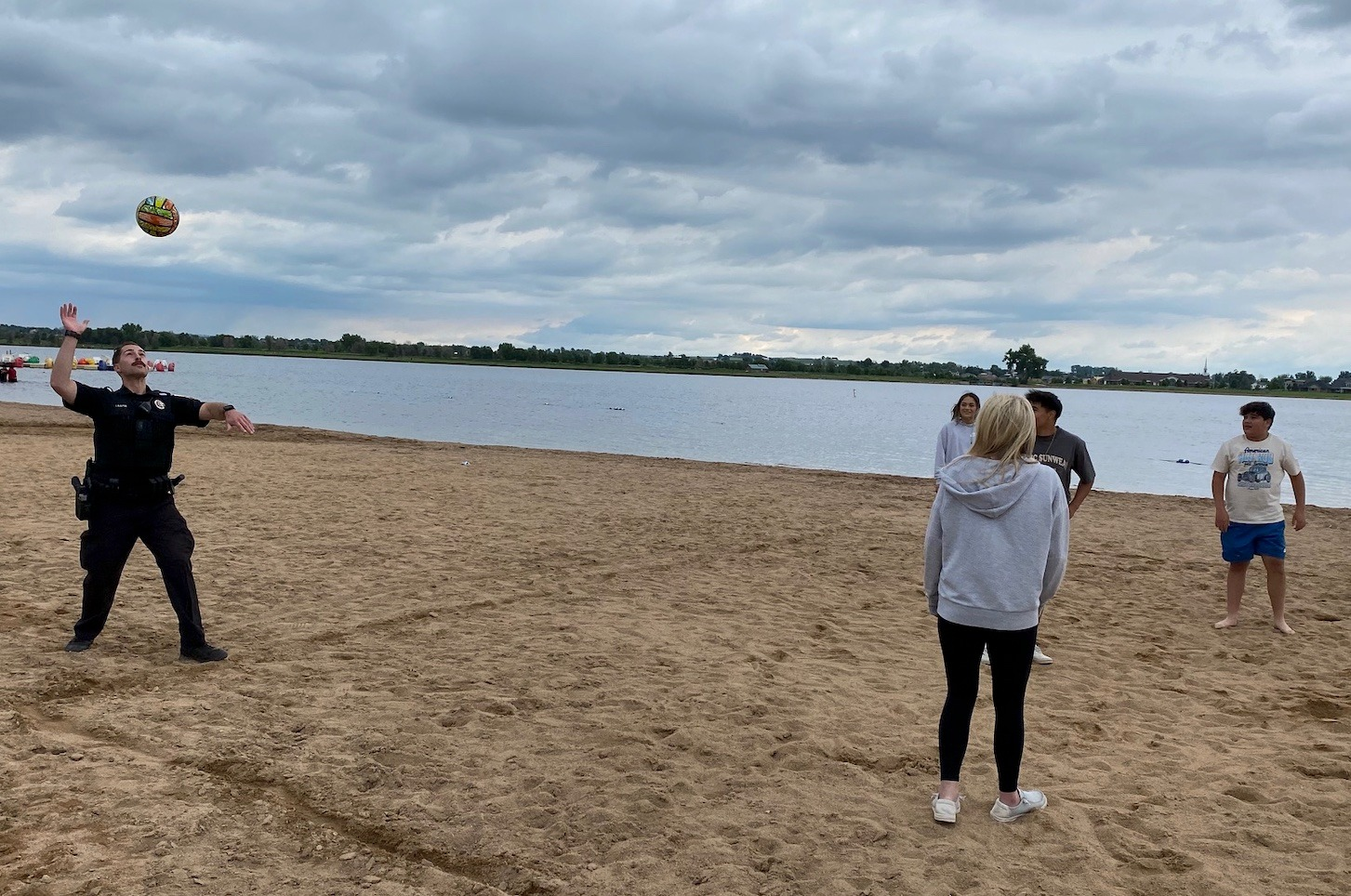
Colorado Ranger playing volleyball.

The Colorado Rangers incorporate community policing practices that are friendly and visible. Rangers utilize a balanced approach with noted emphasis and training designed to protect the rights of the people they serve. They are also equipped, capable, and ready to involve themselves in more serious events such as riots, events of nature, or other emergency police needs. All officers are required to document each contact with citizens and record their interactions with Body Worn Cameras.

=== Disasters and emergency management ===
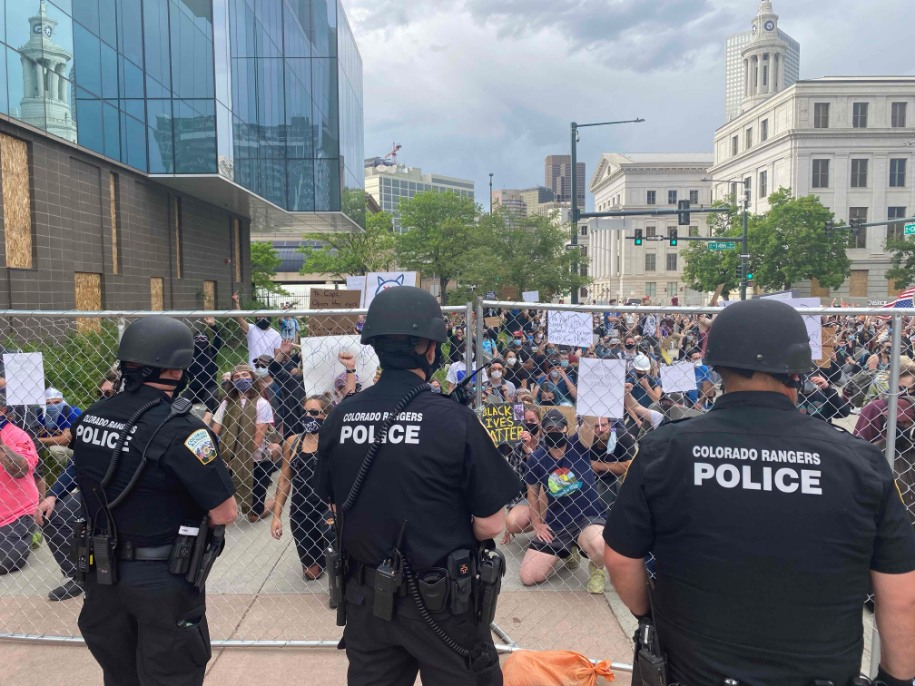
Colorado Rangers respond to a George Floyd protest.

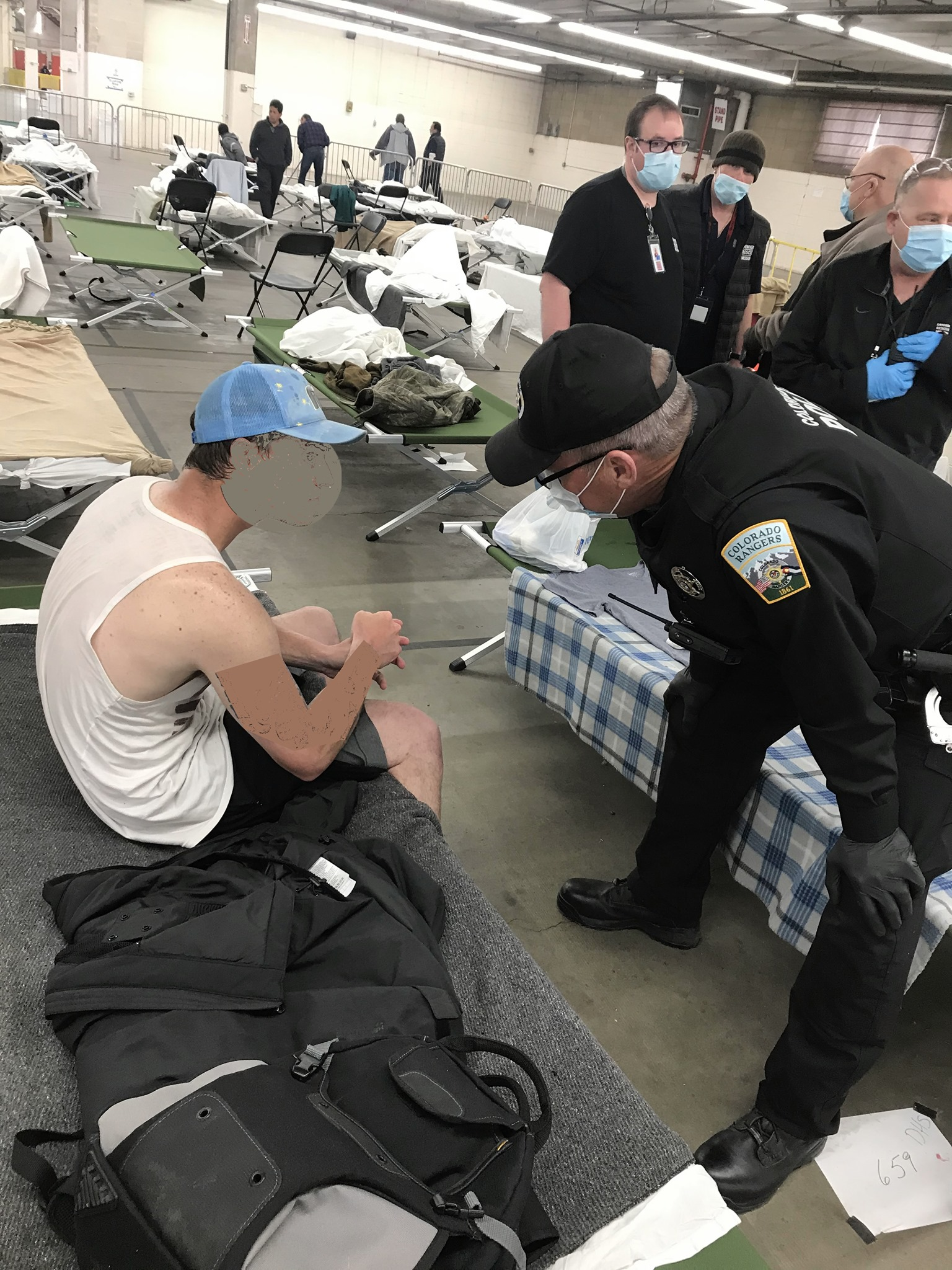
Colorado Ranger helping a disaster victim in a shelter.

Natural disasters rarely impact a single jurisdiction and often overwhelm local authorities. The statewide shared reserve system created in the state of Colorado has been a proven success for large scale emergency events.

The Colorado Rangers have the ability to appropriate a large number of personnel in a way that few agencies can functionally manage. All Colorado Rangers receive training from FEMA as well as training with other local, state, and federal agencies to remain prepared at all times to support expanding events. Rapid mobilization allows for local Sheriffs and Chiefs of Police flexibility to manage unpredictable events.

The agency has saved agencies in Colorado millions of dollars in personnel costs due to the Rangers ability to integrate into existing operations with ease. The agency becomes invaluable during these times of need and reduces the impact on the full-time police officers and deputies serving in an impacted area.

== Colorado Rangers reserve academy ==
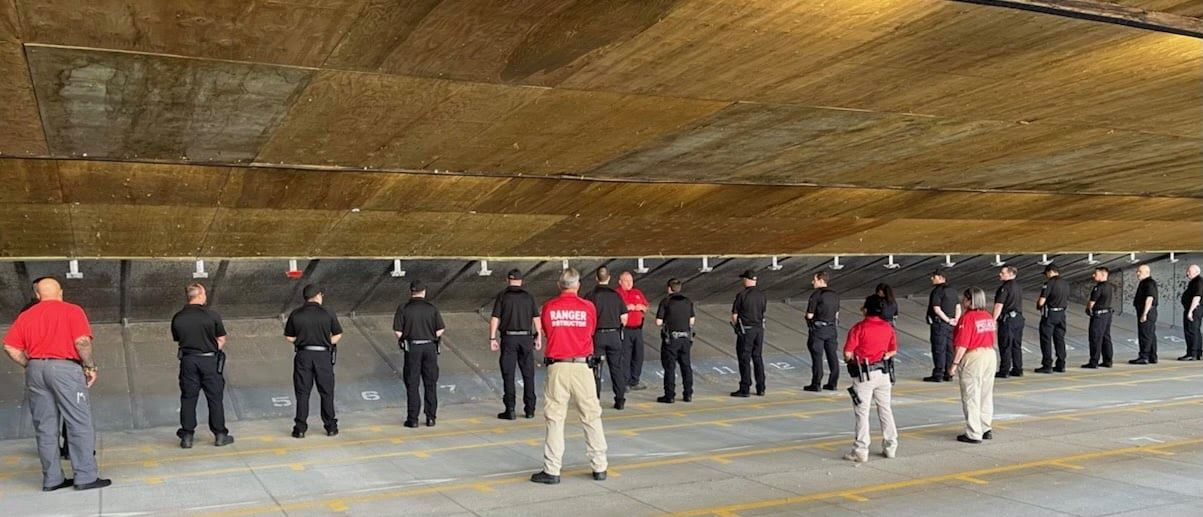
Colorado Rangers Academy firearm training.

The Colorado Rangers operate and manage reserve law enforcement training academies, approved by the Colorado Peace Officer Standards and Training Board. The Rangers have graduated nine classes since its inauguration in 2018. The 10th Academy began in November 2023 and graduated 18 new sworn personnel in May 2024.

The academy provides tuition free reserve officer training for those who agree to serve as a Colorado Ranger for 3 years with a minimum of 150 duty hours per year. Cadets sponsored by or intending to serve other police agencies can be accepted with paid tuition.

Before attending the academy, all cadets must pass a rigorous background check and psychological examination as well as meet all P.O.S.T standards required to be hired as law enforcement officers. Due to cost associated with training and the nature of the Ranger's academy providing officers that will go on to staff many local agencies and various assignments, only competitively exceptional applicants are accepted.

The Colorado Rangers maintains a cadre of training personnel which includes an Academy Director and a number of highly qualified instructors in firearms, medical, arrest control, active-shooter, Taser, OC, driving, law, and academics. Colorado Rangers instructors also support training for outside agencies and lead and support other law enforcement training programs throughout Colorado.

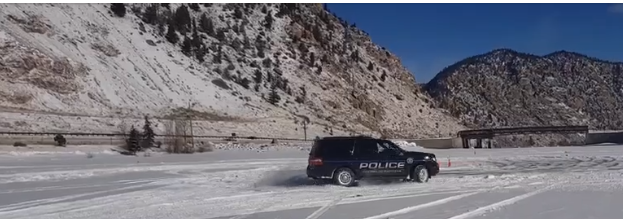
Police driver being trained on a frozen lake

Colorado Rangers utilize training facilities throughout Colorado and continue to expand as the need for a statewide training model grows. The Colorado Rangers Reserve Academy has hosted 9 academies at Flatrock Regional Training Center in Commerce City, CO. led by instructors from the Colorado Rangers, Adams County, and other agencies. Additional training programs are held throughout the state and the Rangers can often be seen hosting programs at Highlands Ranch Law Enforcement Training Facility as well as active engagements with Colorado community colleges that offer P.O.S.T. approved curriculums and training programs. As the agency expands with additional partner police agencies, it is predictable that future academy classes may be held in different areas throughout the state in order to accommodate a geographically diverse workforce.

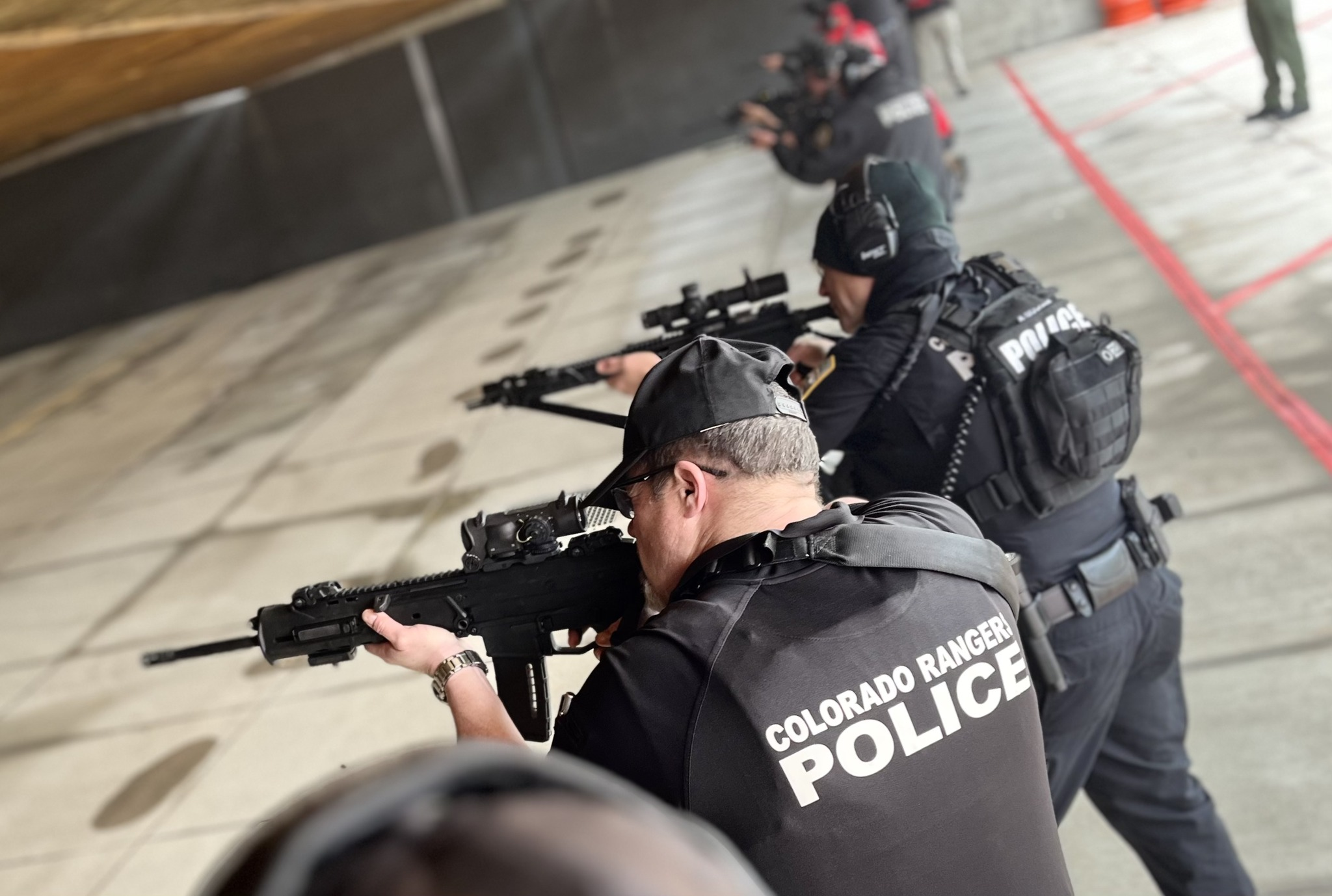
Colorado Ranger rifle training.

All Reserve Police Officers in Colorado must attend a minimum of 251 in-person academy contact hours plus an optional 44 hours for driving as part of a standard police academy curriculum. There is no discernable difference in training for Colorado reserve police training for perishable skills such as arrest control, firearms, or driving and these programs are often conducted alongside officers being trained for full time police careers. The primary difference in training for reserve officers is in academic classroom education where reserve officers receive 117 hours of instruction vs. 380 hours offered in Colorado Basic Police Academies. Once officers complete the academy they will undergo additional training on the job with the agencies they serve. Reserve Police Officers wishing to transition to full-time status are able to complete additional academic hours at any P.O.S.T. approved training facility with Academy Director approval.

Once an officer passes the academy and becomes a sworn police officer, Colorado Rangers continue their education ongoingly by participating in advanced level courses as well as training provided by Federal Agencies such as Department of Homeland Security, FBI, etc.

== Rank structure ==
=== Commissioned officers ===
Rank	Insignia	Description
Colonel		Chief
Lieutenant Colonel		Deputy Chief
Major		Division Commanders
Captain		Troop Commanders
Lieutenant		Executive Officers

=== Non-commissioned officers ===
Rank	Insignia
Sergeant	
Corporal	
Ranger	No Insignia

== Fallen rangers ==
- Edward P. (Eddie) Bell was killed in the line of duty on October 16, 1922 at the age of 33, after he and his partner were ambushed while responding to an anonymous tip of a robbery in progress. Ranger Bell is memorialized at the Colorado Law Enforcement Memorial in Golden as well as the National Law Enforcement Officers Memorial in Washington, D.C.

== See also ==
- Colorado Mounted Rangers
- Colorado State Patrol
- Texas Rangers
- Arizona Rangers
- California State Rangers
- New Mexico Mounted Patrol
