= Warren S. George =

American labor leader

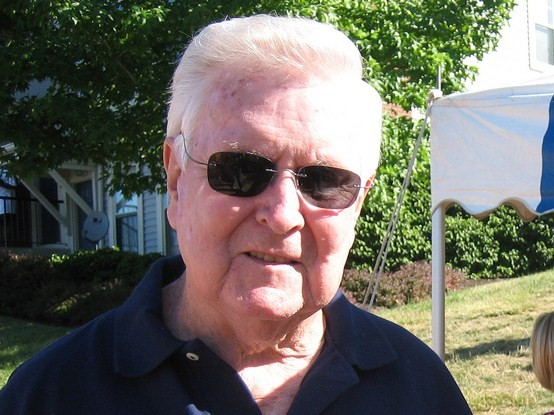
- George in 2008
- Occupation: International President Emeritus of the ATU

Warren S. George is an American union activist and International President Emeritus of the Amalgamated Transit Union (ATU), one of the largest and most politically active unions in the AFL-CIO. From 2003 to 2010, George served as the International President of the ATU.

George is mentioned in the song "Workin' for the MTA" on Justin Townes Earle's 2010 Harlem River Blues album. The lyrics read:

"Yeah, them hard times are going around, hard times are goin' around, hard times are goin' around, bringin' hard luck on New York town. But I'm bankin' on the ATU, bankin' on the ATU, I'm bankin' on the ATU, Brother George is gonna see me through."

Trade union offices
Preceded by Jim La Sala	President of the Amalgamated Transit Union; 2003–2010	Succeeded by Larry Hanley
