= Denver streetcar strike of 1920 =

Denver streetcar strike
- Part of US Streetcar Strikes
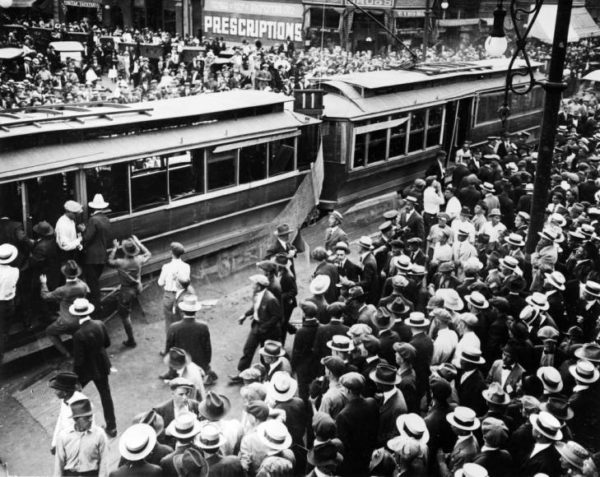
- Crowds on 15th Street during the strike
- Date: August 1–7, 1920
- Location: Denver, Colorado
- Caused by: Lower wages for streetcar workers
- Methods: Striking, rioting, street fighting

Parties
| Streetcar workers Civilians | Denver Police Department, Colorado National Guard, Federal troops, civilians |

Casualties
- Deaths: 7
- Injuries: 50

The Denver streetcar strike of 1920 was a labor action and series of urban riots in downtown Denver, Colorado, beginning on August 1, 1920, and lasting six days. Seven were killed and 50 were seriously injured in clashes among striking streetcar workers, strike-breakers, local police, federal troops and the public. This was the "largest and most violent labor dispute involving transportation workers and federal troops".

== Background ==
Denver Tramway provided public transportation for the residents of Denver since its incorporation in 1886. Early in the company's history, they competed against other corporations for the public's patronage. Denver Tramway expanded aggressively and by 1895 had bought or driven its competitors out of business. In that year Thomas S. McMurry was elected mayor after campaigning against the city's public service corporations and demanding a portion of their profits. Denver Tramway campaigned against McMurry in 1899 and he failed to win reelection. Around this time public opinion began to turn against Denver Tramway culminating in 1905 when the company's franchise was supposed to end. In 1893 the Colorado Supreme Court had ruled that a perpetual franchise was unconstitutional, but reversed its ruling after pressure from Denver Tramway's political allies. In an effort to appease the public, the company drew up a new franchise in 1906 which became permanent in 1910 when a newly reconstructed Colorado Supreme Court ruled all perpetual franchises unconstitutional.

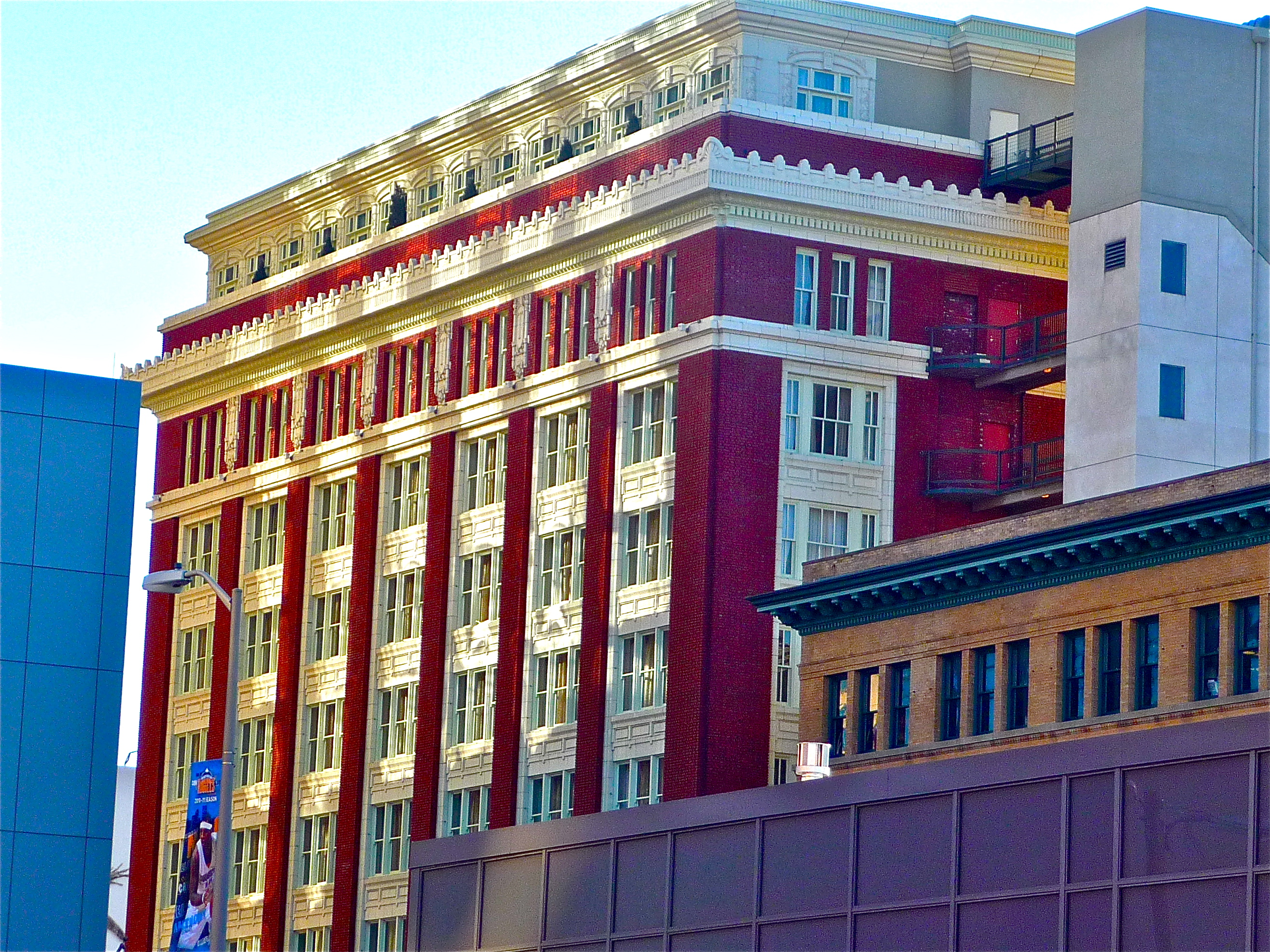
Denver Tramway Company building, newly built as its headquarters in 1912

While generous for the company the 1906 franchise specified a fixed rate fare, set at 5 cents, and the requirement that Denver Tramway pay 50% maintenance on any roadway on which it had a two-way line. As automobile traffic increased in the early twentieth century, maintenance on the roads became much more costly. Though the company was seeing record ridership levels - by 1917 it was making 62 million trips a year - it was not able to increase its fares to cover its increased expenses. The Tramway company petitioned the Colorado Public Utilities Commission, who authorized a 2-cent fare increase. The city of Denver sued and in 1919 Dewey C. Bailey was elected mayor on a promise to reinstate the 5-cent fare. The Denver Tramway Company responded with layoffs and pay cuts.

Denver streetcar workers had organized in July 1918 as local 746 of the Amalgamated Association of Street and Electric Railway Employees of America. Within a year, that union had successfully brought new rulings from the War Labor Board that eliminated war-time restrictions, giving them an eight-hour day and a wage hike. Denver Tramway, violating the board's orders, cut the workers pay, and was the target of a four-day strike in July 1919.

Positions hardened through the next year. In July 1920, the company again threatened to cut wages unless the city allowed fare increases. The public opposed a fare increase and the city wouldn't allow it. Workers voted to strike, and the union delivered an ultimatum with a deadline of August 1. The company responded by hiring the California strike-breaker John "Black Jack" Jerome.

== Strike ==
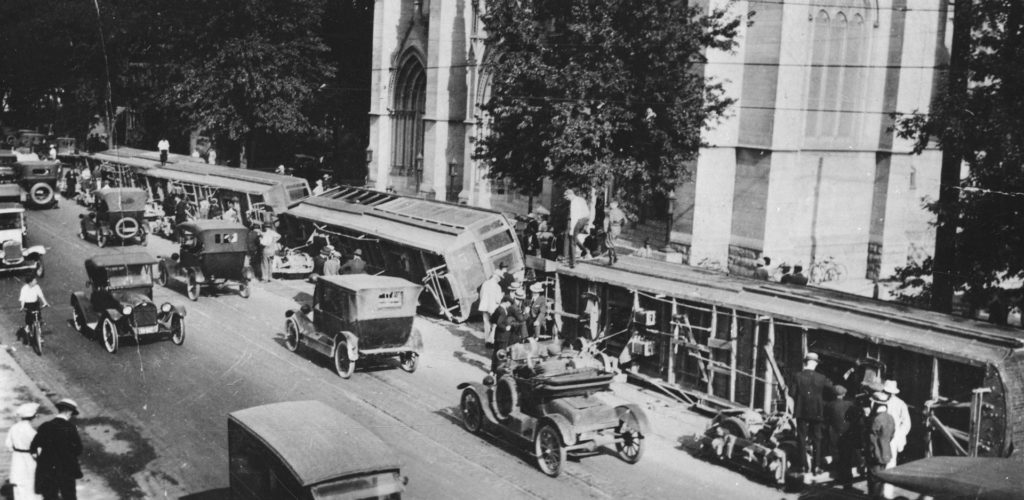
Strikers overturned streetcars in front of the Cathedral of the Immaculate Conception on Colfax Street in the first week of August 1920.

The strike brought the city to a standstill. On August 3 Jerome arrived by train with his first 37 men, a mix of college students, guards, detectives, and men "of a minor criminal class familiar to police departments east and west". Jerome's men were obviously armed, not only with their own weapons, but armed by the city as deputized special officers.

On August 4 Jerome himself is said to have piloted the first car to defy the strikers, from a barn at Fourteenth and Arapahoe. That car was overturned by a mob, and triggered a physical confrontation between Jerome's men and union sympathizers.

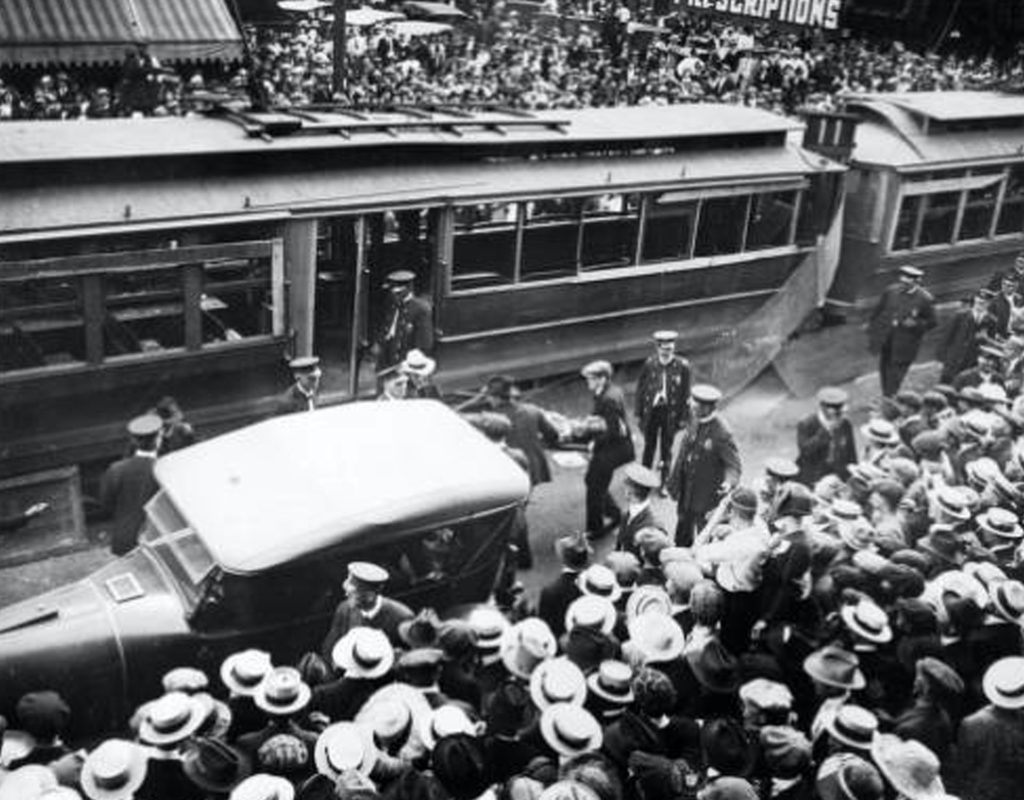
Two people carry an injured man on a stretcher, nearby a trolley, to an ambulance while a crowd onlooks.

Three cars made a circuit of the city. The first serious violence happened on the afternoon of Thursday the 5th, as parading union demonstrators encountered two streetcars headed back to the barn. Then into the evening three or four separate violent mobs formed in the city. One crowd of 2000 led an attack on the anti-union Denver Post building and the Tramway Building, another overran Union Station in search of Jerome, others fought with police in the downtown district. Two were killed that evening and 33 wounded, including the chief of police, who was hit in the face with a brickbat.

At 1 a.m. on Friday August 6, Mayor Dewey C. Bailey announced that the scope of violence was more than the city's police could handle. Almost one third of the police force had sustained significant injuries. Bailey called for 2,000 citizen volunteers to be armed as a militia. The violence continued. That evening, five more people were shot to death, and 25 wounded, at the East Division car barns when strikebreakers fired into a crowd.

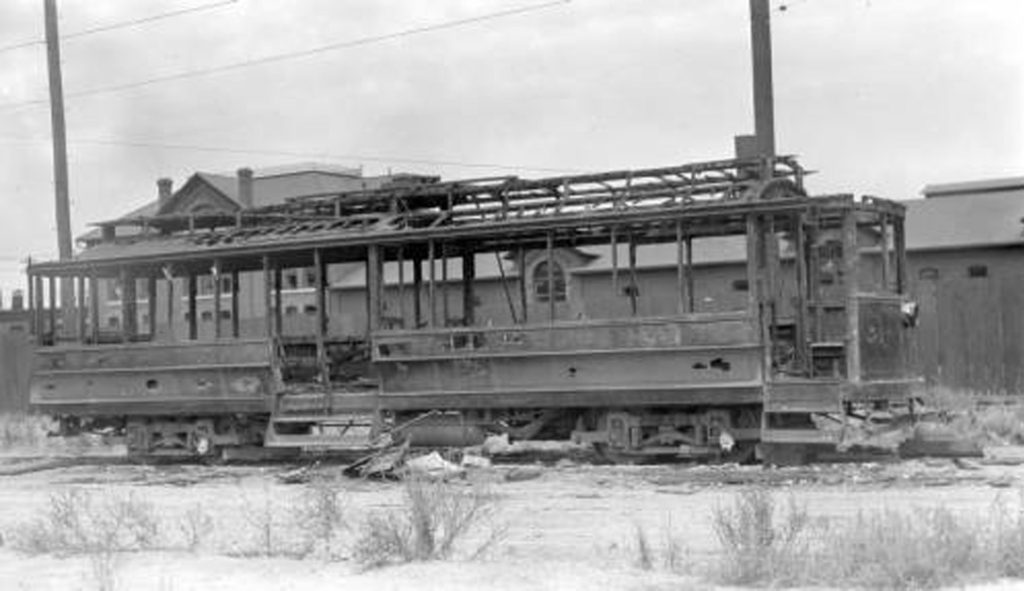
Denver Tramway car 51, burned during the strike.

== Resolution ==
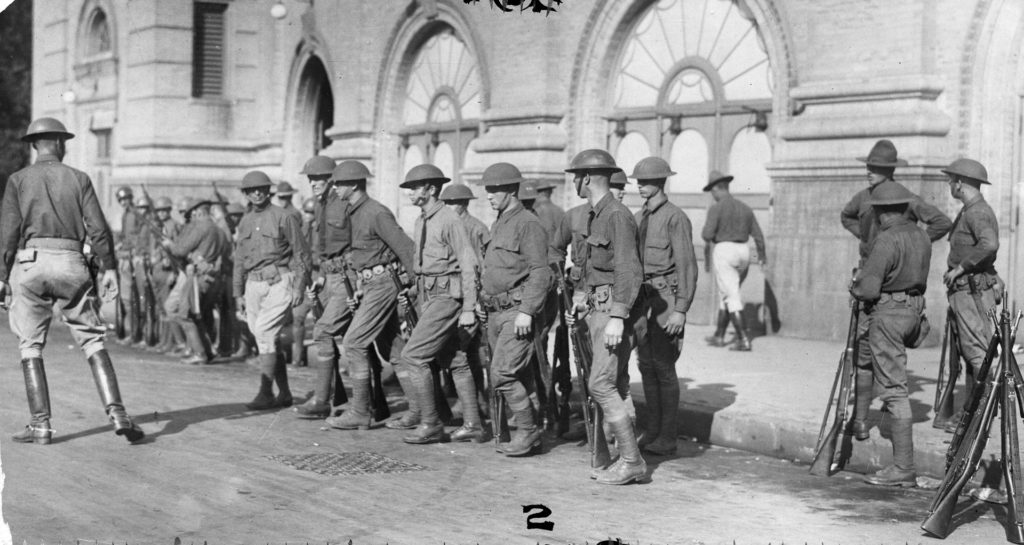
More than 700 federal troops were deployed to Denver after the first week of the tramway strike.

Later on Friday, Bailey and Governor Oliver Shroup appealed for federal assistance. Colonel C.C. Ballou arrived in the early hours of Saturday the 7th with 250 troops from Fort Logan and put Denver under martial law.

This quelled the violence almost immediately. Ballou's commander Maj. Gen. Leonard Wood arrived to inspect the scene on the 9th, and would later say that arming the strikebreakers had been "a colossal blunder". In the aftermath of the strike, the Denver Tramway Company filed for bankruptcy.

The strike destroyed the union local, which would not reform until 1933. All seven of the fatal casualties had been bystanders.
