= Adella Brown Bailey =

American politician and suffragist

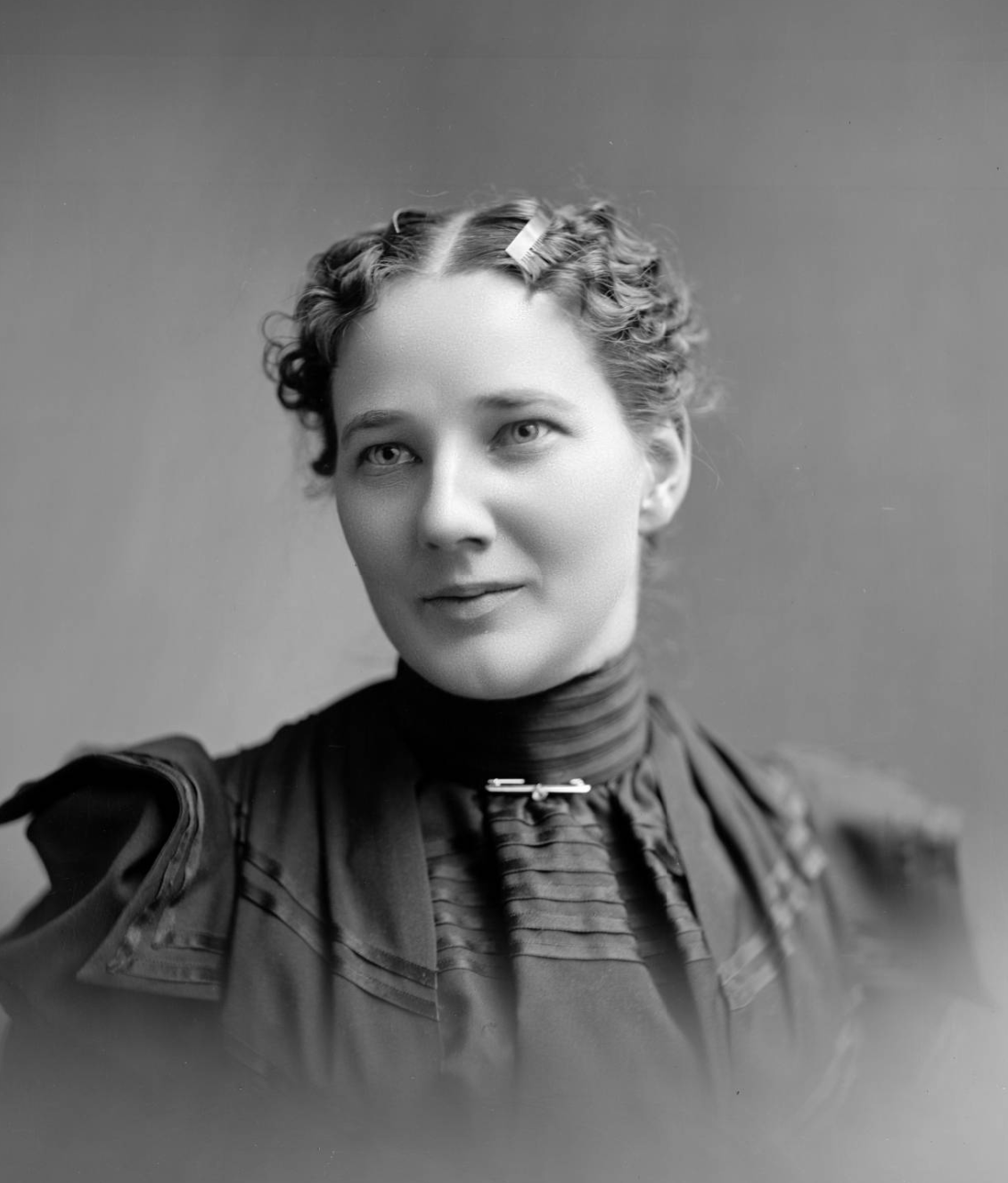
- Adella Brown Bailey (1899)
- Born: Adella Brown; February 8, 1860; Aurora, New York
- Died: 1937 (aged 76–77)
- Resting place: Denver, Colorado
- Other names: Mrs. Dewey C. Bailey
- Occupations: Politician, Clubwoman
- Spouse: Dewey Crossman Bailey (m. 1880)

Adella Brown Bailey (1860–1937) was an American politician and suffragist.

== Life ==
Bailey née Brown was born on February 8, 1860, in Aurora, New York. In 1880 she married Dewey C. Bailey with whom she had one child.

Brown's husband, Dewey, was the mayor of Denver, Colorado from 1919 through 1923. Along with her husband, Adella was involved in political life in Denver, active in the Republican Party and serving in 1920 as an alternate delegate from Colorado to the Republican National Convention.

Brown was clubwoman. She was a member of the Women's Club of Denver (WCD), serving as president for four terms. She was also involved with the Equal Suffrage Association.

Nichol died in 1937.

== See also ==
- List of suffragists and suffragettes
