= Philip S. Van Cise =

American politician (1884–1969)

Philip S. Van Cise (October 25, 1884 – December 8, 1969) was an American lawyer and military officer. He is best known for arresting and prosecuting the notorious "Million-Dollar Bunco Ring", headed by Lou Blonger, a story he recounted in his book Fighting the Underworld.

== Early life ==
Van Cise was born on October 25, 1884, in Deadwood, South Dakota, and moved to Denver at age 16. He graduated from the University of Colorado in 1907, and received his law degree two years later. From 1910 to 1914, he was a member of the Colorado National Guard, where he attained the rank of captain. During World War I he served as an intelligence officer in France and remained in the Officer Reserve Corps as a Lieutenant colonel until 1942.

== District attorney ==
Van Cise took advantage of a split in the Denver's Republican Party to win the Republican primary and the office of district attorney in 1921. He immediately set out to clean up the con men who preyed on Colorado's summer tourist trade. The gang was well connected with politicians at all levels, but had no control over Van Cise, who was not beholden to the political power structure. At the same time, Van Cise received little backing in his effort from either the mayor, Dewey C. Bailey, or law enforcement officials, many of whom, it would later be shown, were in league with the con men.

In 1922, Van Cise set up an independent investigation of the Blonger gang, secretly funded by a group of wealthy Denver citizens and employing a handful of former federal agents and others. On August 24 of that year, Van Cise used a special force of Colorado Rangers to capture 33 suspects in a single day. Fearing that Denver police would tip off the gang once the first suspect was taken to jail, Van Cise detained the gang members in the basement of the First Universalist Church, where he was a member, until the sweep was complete. In Colorado's longest and most expensive trial to that time, 20 con men, including Lou Blonger, were convicted and sent to prison, effectively busting the "Million-Dollar Bunco Ring."

Van Cise also waged battle against the Ku Klux Klan during his four-year term in office. His life was threatened, crosses were burned in his yard, and one attempt was made to kidnap him. Van Cise refused the call of many citizens to run for mayor to replace Bailey in 1923 and returned to private practice in 1925.

== Private attorney ==
Returning to private life, Van Cise formed a law partnership with his former assistant district attorney, Kenneth Robinson. In 1936, he wrote and published his memoir of the gang-busting saga, Fighting the Underworld, which became an influential book in criminology circles.

Drama followed Van Cise into private life. For more than 20 years, he served as an attorney for the Rocky Mountain News, and during this time aggressively defended the paper when it was sued for libel by Frederick Gilmer Bonfils, publisher of The Denver Post. Bonfils died before the case was tried. In 1943, two men tried to kidnap Van Cise from his front yard. Then, in 1945, the husband of a woman Van Cise represented in a divorce took two shots at him in his law office, to no effect.

== Later life and death ==
Van Cise retired from practice in 1967 and died in Denver's St. Luke's Hospital on December 8, 1969, aged 84, after a month-long illness.
