= Lou Blonger =

American mobster (1849–1924)

- 1923 mugshot of Blonger
- Born: Louis Herbert Belonger; May 13, 1849; Swanton, Vermont, US
- Died: April 20, 1924 (aged 74); Cañon City, Colorado, US
- Occupation: "Fixer" for gang of confidence men
- Spouse(s): Emma Loring; Cora Lyons (née Morehouse)
- Criminal charges: Conspiracy, fraud
- Penalty: 7 years

Lou Blonger (May 13, 1849 – April 20, 1924), born Louis Herbert Belonger, was a Wild West saloonkeeper, gambling-house owner, and mine speculator, but is best known as the kingpin of an extensive ring of confidence tricksters that operated for more than 25 years in Denver, Colorado. His "Million-Dollar Bunco Ring" was brought to justice in an infamous 1923 trial.

Blonger's gang set up rooms resembling stock exchanges and betting parlors that were used by several teams to run "big cons". The goal of the con was to convince tourists to put up large sums of cash in order to secure delivery of stock profits or winning bets. The depiction of the "Wire Con" seen in the movie The Sting is a fairly accurate representation of a typical big con.

Blonger had longstanding ties to numerous Denver politicians and law enforcement officials, including the mayor and the chief of police. In 1922, however, District Attorney Philip S. Van Cise bypassed the Denver police and used his own force, funded by donations solicited in secret from local citizens, to arrest 33 con men, including Blonger, and bring the ring to justice.

== Childhood ==
Lou Blonger was born in Swanton, Vermont, on May 13, 1849, the eighth of 13 children. His father, Simon Peter Belonger, was a stonemason born in Canada of French ancestry. His mother, Judith Kennedy, was raised in an orphanage in Nenagh, County Tipperary, Ireland. The Belonger family migrated from Vermont to the lead mining village of Shullsburg, Wisconsin, when Lou was five years old. After his mother died in 1859, Lou lived with his older sister and her husband for a few years. Around this time Blonger began using a shortened version of the family name (omitting the first "e"), as most of his brothers did.

Blonger followed brothers Mike and Joe into the Union Army in 1864. Although he was still three days shy of his 15th birthday, Blonger was mustered in as a fifer at Warren, Illinois, and served a few weeks with Company B of the 142nd Illinois Regiment before suffering a leg injury at White Station, Tennessee. He spent the remainder of his 100-day enlistment recovering at the Marine Hospital in Chicago.

At the conclusion of the Civil War, Blonger reunited with his brother Sam, ten years his elder, who had spent the war years prospecting in Colorado and driving freight over the mountains in California and Nevada. Lou was living in Mount Carroll, Illinois, with a friend named William Livingston when Sam returned. While Sam courted and eventually married Livingston's sister Ella, Lou attended high school. Later Sam sent his brother to study at Bryant & Stratton Business College in Chicago.

== In the Western boomtowns ==
In 1870, Sam and Lou Blonger, along with many of the Livingstons, left the Midwest for the western frontier. Following the path of the newly completed Transcontinental Railroad, they briefly ran a hotel and saloon in Red Oak, Iowa, before moving on to Salt Lake City, Utah and the nearby mining towns of Stockton and Dry Canyon. In a pattern that repeated itself at many of their stops, Lou owned and operated saloons with assorted entertainments while Sam developed mining claims in the surrounding mountains, served occasionally as a peace officer and, in his spare time, raced horses. Similar stops followed in Virginia City, Nevada; Cornucopia, Nevada; Silver Reef, Utah; and again in Salt Lake City.

Moving to Colorado in 1879, Lou Blonger took a shot at running a vaudeville theater in Georgetown, while Sam made an unsuccessful bid to become the first mayor of nearby Leadville. There the Blongers were joined by two other brothers: Simon, the eldest, who worked as superintendent at the Robert E. Lee Mine, and Marvin, the youngest, also a miner. Soon afterward, Sam and Lou were on the move again, this time to the burgeoning railroad town of New Albuquerque, New Mexico (soon to merge with Albuquerque).

== Albuquerque days ==
Sam Blonger was appointed marshal of New Albuquerque in February 1882 and quickly deputized his brother. Newspaper accounts indicate that while the brothers engaged in a few shootouts and jailed their share of vagrants, they also took plenty of time off to pursue other interests: prospecting, horse racing, and even running a brothel.

For a couple of months the Blongers were toasted as the solution to the town's law enforcement problem (a previous marshal, Milt Yarberry, had murdered two citizens). When Sam and Lou were joined briefly by brother Joe, a prospector in the nearby Cerrillos Hills, a local newspaper wrote: "The three brothers are all of them young, nervy and square western men and it would be a good thing for the town if they were all on the police force."

In April 1882, Lou Blonger served as acting town marshal while Sam traveled to Denver to negotiate the sale of a mine. Lou's stint roughly coincided with the escape to New Mexico by the Vendetta Posse, composed of Wyatt Earp, Doc Holliday, and five others. Hoping to make their way to legal sanctuary in Colorado, the men took temporary refuge in New Albuquerque after killing several men to avenge the murder of Wyatt's brother Morgan. According to one theory, Lou or Sam (or both) may have been called upon to provide shelter for the posse members during their stay.

Sam Blonger's appointment as marshal of New Albuquerque lasted just five months. He was relieved of his duties while on a trip to Kansas City, and soon afterward, Lou and Sam split up for the only extended period of their adult lives. Lou spent the next few years in the New Mexico towns of Silver City, Deming, and Kingston, living at least part of the time with Frank Thurmond, a well-known gambler, and his wife, Carlotta Thompkins (better known as Lottie Deno). Blonger also got married, probably in 1884, to Emma Loring.

In 1888, a woman calling herself Kitty Blonger shot and killed a man who tried to break into her room in a Peach Springs, Arizona, brothel. Lou Blonger soon arrived to arrange her defense, and eventually she was acquitted. Kitty had previously worked in Albuquerque, where she had a soiled reputation. She may have been one of Blonger's madams, but the exact nature of their relationship has not been determined.

== The Denver underworld ==
Soon after the Kitty Blonger trial, Lou Blonger relocated permanently to Denver, rejoining his brother Sam. The pair operated several saloons and gambling houses in the area of Larimer Street and Seventeenth Street over the next few years, including the magnificent Elite Saloon at 1628 Stout Street, with its mahogany fixtures and frescoed ceiling. In addition to hosting the typical array of poker and faro tables, the Blongers' operation also branched out into the "policy racket" (also known as the "numbers game"), an illegal lottery that paid out on a daily basis. The Blongers aggressively targeted tourists, who were lured to the saloon by a network of henchmen called "steerers" and then cheated out of their money. The sophistication of the swindles developed over time. In the early years they were as simple as marked cards or loaded dice; later, elaborate "big cons" became the Blonger trademark.

Denver had a reputation as a wide-open town in the 1890s. Gambling shops bought protection from the police force and the mayor's office and operated openly except when occasional crackdowns were required for show. In addition to making direct payments to authorities, Sam and Lou Blonger also engaged in election fraud for candidates from both parties, from Denver mayor Wolfe Londoner in 1890 to Congressman Robert W. Bonynge in 1902. Testimony in the latter case indicated that Blonger's network of steerers had already been in place for several years.

The Blongers' policy shop had plenty of competition, including saloon man Ed Chase and Soapy Smith, the famous Western con man. Smith was an uneasy Blonger ally for a while, but the frequent quarrels between steerers from the rival groups suggested a confrontation was brewing. In 1895 Smith went on a drunken rampage through several Larimer Street establishments including the Blongers' saloon, where police removed him; one account alleged that Lou Blonger was crouched behind the cigar counter, ready to unload a shotgun. In the wake of the rampage, Smith and his brother Bascomb were charged with the attempted murder of a saloon manager. Realizing he had lost control of the situation, Soapy left for the mining boomtown of Skagway, Alaska, in 1897, ceding control of Denver's underworld to Lou Blonger.

== The Forest Queen ==
In 1892, Sam and Lou Blonger found the gold mine they had been looking for in the mountains above Cripple Creek, Colorado, and named it the Forest Queen (38°44′48″N 105°08′27″W). Sam and Lou had several partners in the mine at different stages of its development, some of whom were extraordinarily well-placed. Two of them, Neil Dennison and Robert W. Steele, served as district attorney in Denver during the 1890s. Dennison was the son of a former governor of Ohio and Steele later became chief justice of the Colorado Supreme Court. A third partner of note was J. W. McCulloch, manufacturer of Green River Whiskey, who supposedly traded 20 barrels of his product for a piece of Lou Blonger's stake.

Once developed, the Forest Queen provided its owners with periods of steady income, if not the fortune that came out of the nearby Independence Mine. Lou and Sam Blonger claimed, bought, traded, and sold several mines in their lives, but both held onto the Forest Queen to the end, leaving their interest to their wives.

The Blongers were keen observers in the frequent labor struggles between miners and mine owners. Conditions reached a head in 1894 during the "Battle of Bull Hill", when striking miners took up arms in the hills near the Forest Queen. Lou Blonger and several allies from Denver were frequent visitors to the area during the months-long dispute and its aftermath, calling themselves "detectives".

== "Million-Dollar Bunco Ring" ==
As his gang branched out into bigger and more complicated "big cons" that attracted a more well-to-do clientele, Lou Blonger found he no longer needed his saloon and the relatively small take it provided from card and dice games. Eventually he moved into headquarters in the American National Bank building on Seventeenth Street and styled himself as a mining magnate. A crucial moment in the development of the bunco gang was Blonger's partnership in 1904 with Adolph W. Duff, who had operated his own gang of confidence men in Colorado Springs before being run out of town by the police. With Duff handling the details of coordinating gang members and scheduling locations for the scams, Blonger was free to conduct the business of schmoozing public officials and bribing law enforcement, all while cultivating the image of a model citizen. In the summertime he made the rounds of friendly politicians and policemen, paying off favors with boxes of cherries from his orchard in suburban Lakewood.

For the next 18 years Blonger and his gang operated virtually unmolested by local law enforcement. Gang members were specifically instructed not to solicit victims from Colorado, concentrating instead on out-of-state tourists who would find it difficult to help prosecute a criminal case. Only twice during this period did Blonger come close to arrest. The first was in 1910, when he escaped prosecution in connection with the Maybray Gang of Council Bluffs, Iowa. The second occurred in 1915, when Blonger was implicated in a swindling scheme uncovered by carpenters remodeling his office building.

Sam Blonger's participation in his brother's gang waned as bigger and more sophisticated cons were developed, and he died in 1914. Meanwhile, Lou Blonger expanded the gang's home base from Denver, where it operated only during the warmest months, southward to Miami and Havana. During the winter Blonger relaxed at Hot Springs, Arkansas, where he reportedly compared notes with his old friend Allan Pinkerton, president of the Pinkerton Detective Agency.

=== Investigation and arrest ===
During the 1920 primary election for Denver district attorney, Blonger approached Republican Party candidate Philip S. Van Cise and offered assistance in the way of campaign contributions and votes. To Blonger's surprise, Van Cise turned down his offer, and after his election, Van Cise called Blonger into his office to warn him that one of his goals would be the eradication of Blonger's gang of con men. Recognizing that the police force was in Blonger's pocket, Van Cise undertook a private investigation underwritten by donations from 31 wealthy benefactors. Over the course of a year, his detectives gathered information and watched the habits and movements of the gang members. Van Cise monitored Blonger's trash, spied on him from a building across the street, and had a Dictaphone installed surreptitiously inside his office (an action that did not require a search warrant at the time). He also allowed a crooked police detective to work inside the district attorney's office, feeding him misleading information to confuse the gang.

In the summer of 1922, Van Cise made it well known he was going on a long fishing vacation to the Rocky Mountains, signaling to the gang members that the heat was off their operation. While the con men plied their trade openly on the streets of Denver, Van Cise and his assistants plotted a huge roundup that required a willing victim to help catch the gang in the act. With good fortune, J. Frank Norfleet showed up in Denver at precisely this moment. Norfleet was a Texas rancher who had previously been scammed twice by other gangs and was on a nationwide manhunt to bring the men who swindled him to justice. Entering the lobby of the Brown Palace Hotel, Norfleet was hooked by unwitting gang members who saw him as an easy mark, and the plan was set in motion.

The posse assembled early on the morning of August 24, 1922: eighteen Colorado Rangers to arrest the gang members and several private citizens to chauffeur them to a holding cell in the basement of the First Universalist Church. Blonger and Duff were among the first to be arrested; eventually 33 gang members were hauled in before news of the raid reached the street, allowing the remainder of the gang to flee.

Although newspapers across the country carried the particulars of the unusual sting, the Denver Post at first declined to print Blonger's name. Co-publisher Harry Heye Tammen was a close friend of Blonger's, but his partner Fred Bonfils ordered the paper's editors to end the embargo and support Van Cise and the prosecution of the "Million-Dollar Bunco Ring". The nickname the papers hung on the gang didn't tell half the story. The con men's total haul was impossible to determine, but in any case was well in excess of a million dollars per year.

=== Trial ===
Blonger had a host of legal talent at his disposal, not to mention a sympathetic judge or two. His personal lawyer, Thomas Ward, Jr., was a former U.S. district attorney who had argued cases before the U.S. Supreme Court. While the rest of the gang was represented by lesser names, they all benefited from the roadblocks laid down by the lead lawyers in the conspiracy case. The defense successfully fought to have Van Cise removed from the prosecution of the case on a technicality, but Van Cise considered this a tactical error, since it allowed him to spend more time devising the prosecution's strategy and less time in court. The case proceeded with two special prosecutors, S. Harrison White, former chief justice of the Colorado Supreme Court, and Harry C. Riddle, a former district court judge.

The trial began on February 5, 1923. Day after day the prosecution called a series of victims, bilked out of their life savings, to the stand. The star witness, however, was Len Reamey, one of the gang's bookmakers, fourth in the hierarchy behind Blonger, Duff, and bookmaker Jackie French. Reamey provided the inside story of how the gang defrauded hundreds of victims and divided the spoils among themselves. When the prosecution rested after seven weeks of testimony, the defense attorneys surprised everyone by resting their case without presenting a witness, and further by offering to forgo their closing arguments if the prosecution did the same. Van Cise directed the special prosecutors to call their bluff, and so the case went immediately to the jury without any closing arguments.

During the trial rumors were rampant that the jury had been fixed. Blonger's men approached at least four of the jurors, but struck out when they attempted to bribe Herman M. Okuly, a mechanic. Okuly played along with the offer, but immediately reported the deal to his boss, who informed Van Cise. After four days of deliberations, with three jurors still favoring acquittal, Okuly played his ace, telling the holdouts "the difference between me and you is that I got my five hundred dollars, but turned it over to the Judge, and you've still got yours." The three relented, and on March 28, 1923, the jury returned a verdict of guilty against Blonger and the other 19 defendants who remained on trial.

== Incarceration and death ==
Blonger's health, poor even before his arrest, grew increasingly worse during the long trial. In the days after his conviction, while he was still battling to stay out of prison, Blonger received a final blow when the Denver Post revealed that he had led a double life for 20 years, living with his wife, Nola, on weekends and a mistress, Iola Readon, during the week. Rocked by the revelation, he reconciled with his wife, transferring his property to her in anticipation of his incarceration.

As one legal appeal after another failed, Blonger made a final plea to Van Cise to remain free, a plea the district attorney forcefully rejected:

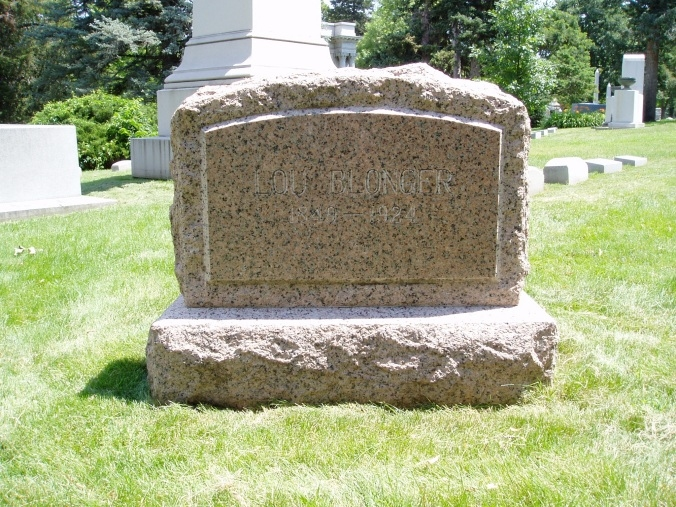
Lou Blonger's headstone in Fairmount Cemetery

What leniency have you shown to others? What God have you worshiped except the Almighty Dollar?

When you stole Preacher Menagh's trust funds, did you hesitate? When, overwhelmed with shame, he committed suicide, did you give any aid to his family? When you took the life earnings of old man Donovan of New Orleans, and reduced him from comfort to penury, what did you do to ease the last months of his life?

You have been a criminal from the time of your youth. You have been the fixer of the town. You have prostituted justice. You have bribed judges and jurors, state, city, and police officials. You have ruined hundreds of men. With that record, tell me why a death sentence is not your due?

Blonger was driven in a special car to the Colorado State Penitentiary on October 18, 1923, and died there on April 20, 1924, succumbing to organ failure. His funeral, held at Denver's Cathedral of the Immaculate Conception, was attended by hundreds of people from all walks of life. Despite his wishes to be buried at Mount Olivet Cemetery, his wife directed that he be interred at Fairmount Cemetery instead.

== Family ==
Lou Blonger married twice. In 1882 (or 1884) in San Francisco, he married Emma Kate Loring. Blonger received an uncontested divorce in 1889 on the grounds of desertion and quickly married 30-year-old Cora "Nola" Lyons (née Morehouse), who was said in younger days to have been a "successful variety actress." Blonger had no children. Upon Nola's death the remainder of Blonger's estate, including his interest in the Forest Queen Mine, passed to her fourth husband, William J. MacAuley.
