= Colorado Mounted Rangers =

American nonprofit organization

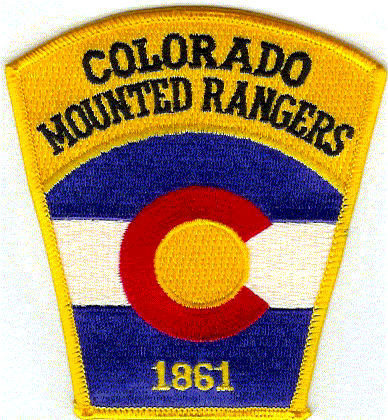
- Shoulder patch
- Common name: Colorado Rangers
- Abbreviation: CMR
- Motto: Protecting and Serving Colorado Since 1861

Agency overview
- Formed: 1861
- Preceding agencies: Jefferson Rangers (1859-1861); Colorado Department of Safety (Colorado Rangers) (1861-1927)
- Superseding agency: Colorado Rangers Law Enforcement Shared Reserve
- Volunteers: Yes

Jurisdictional structure
- Operations jurisdiction: Colorado, USA
- Map of Colorado
- Area: 104,185 square miles (269,840 km^{2})
- Population: 5,456,574 (2015 est.)
- Legal jurisdiction: As per operations jurisdiction

Operational structure
- Rangers: ~200
- Cadets: ~15
- Agency executive: Colonel Ronald M Abramson, State Commander

Notables
- Person: Edward P. Bell, Ranger, for being the only ranger to be killed in the line of duty.
- Significant operation: Law Enforcement Auxiliary

Colorado Mounted Rangers (CMR) is a 501(c)(3) nonprofit organization and former statutory state law enforcement auxiliary in the US State of Colorado. The organization served as the legal entity for the Colorado Rangers from February 1941 until In July 2018, when the Colorado Mounted Rangers ceased their operational law enforcement activities, transitioning the Colorado Rangers to a newly formed government agency named Colorado Rangers Law Enforcement Shared Reserve. All references to the Colorado Mounted Rangers were removed from Colorado Law (Colorado Revised Statutes) on March 26, 2025 in HB25-1181.

Colorado Mounted Rangers provided more than 50,000 annually as volunteer hours to law enforcement agencies throughout the State of Colorado by providing additional peace officer resources in times of need. The Statutory Auxiliary was not funded by tax dollars and the Colorado Mounted Rangers served without pay. The Colorado Rangers are the oldest statewide law enforcement organization in Colorado, originally organized in 1861 by the Colorado Territory.

== Early history of the Colorado Rangers 1861-1941 ==
The Rangers trace their roots to the Jefferson Rangers, keeping the peace in the unofficial Jefferson Territory during the Pikes Peak Gold Rush.

When the Colorado Territory was established in 1861, they were reorganized as the Colorado Rangers, continuing to serve as Colorado's only statewide law enforcement agency through the 1920s. The Colorado Rangers were fashioned after the well known Texas Rangers and served as both law enforcement and state militia.

Marker at Glorietta Pass

The Colorado Rangers often fought on horseback with repeating revolvers and were instrumental in the Battle of Glorieta Pass, helping to stop the Confederate advance towards the Colorado gold fields. This battle has become known as the "Gettysburg of the West" for its importance to the Union victory.

After the Civil War, the Colorado Rangers returned to their law enforcement duties. From time to time the Rangers were also called upon by Colorado's governors to keep the peace during times of civil unrest, natural disasters, and during disputes such as the violent Labor Wars in Colorado's mining towns. The Rangers were also present at the Columbine Mine massacre in 1927. The Rangers were accused of firing machine guns into the crowds of miners during the shooting, which was disputed by the Rangers.

Rangers were also utilized by Denver District Attorney Philip Van Cise to break up organized crime and corruption in Denver's City Hall in the early 1920s.

In 1922 Van Cise set up an independent investigation of the Blonger gang, secretly funded by a group of wealthy Denver citizens. On August 24 of that year, Van Cise used a special force of Colorado Rangers to capture 33 suspects in a single day. Fearing that the Denver Police would tip off the gang once the first suspect was taken to jail, Van Cise detained the gang members in the basement of the First Universalist Church, where he was a member, until the sweep was complete. In Colorado's longest and most expensive trial to that time, 20 con men, including Lou Blonger, was convicted and sent to prison, effectively busting the "Million-Dollar Bunco Ring."

As a result of a campaign promise to organized labor and other interests, Governor William E. Sweet signed an executive order on January 29, 1923, cutting off funding to the Rangers. The Colorado Rangers were officially disbanded by the Colorado General Assembly on April 1, 1927. This left Colorado without statewide police protection until 1935 when the Colorado State Highway Courtesy Patrol (later becoming the Colorado State Patrol) was formed. The Colorado State Patrol was formed to enforce traffic laws on state highways, not as a criminal law enforcement agency.

== Colorado Rangers function as the Colorado Mounted Rangers 1941-2018 ==
=== 1941 reorganization as Colorado Mounted Rangers ===
Governor Teller Ammons re-organized the Colorado Rangers as the Colorado Mounted Rangers. The organization was created as a volunteer law enforcement auxiliary . On February 21, 1941, they were formally incorporated with a single Troop of 50 Rangers headquartered in Bailey.

=== 1955 reorganization ===
In 1955 with a growing role in civil defense and under the guidance of Teller County Sheriff Rufus Jones, the Colorado Mounted Rangers expanded the organization forming a squadron of Troops located throughout the state. Troops partnered with local Law Enforcement agencies in their area to provide them with additional peace officers when needed.

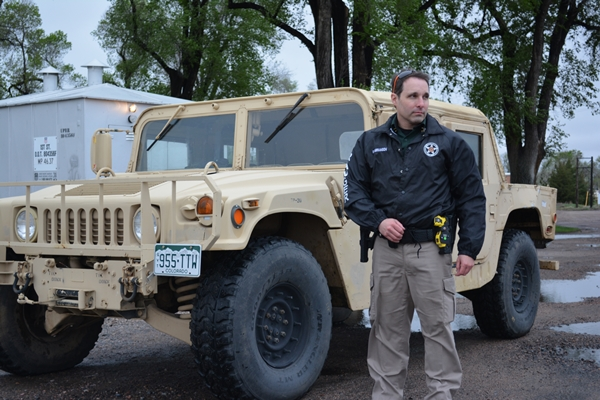
Colorado Mounted Ranger on duty

=== 2017 reorganization and the transition of Colorado Rangers back into official government service ===
In 2017, pursuant recommendations by a special task force created by law to study the authority of Colorado Mounted Rangers, a new government entity was formed to expand role of Colorado Rangers as a governmental law enforcement agency. The Colorado Mounted Rangers ceased their operational law enforcement auxiliary functions on July 15, 2018. The Colorado Mounted Rangers continue to exist as a nonprofit 501(c)(3) organization that supports the Colorado Rangers with foundational level fundraising.

(See: Colorado Rangers)

== Law Enforcement Auxiliary per C.R.S § 24-33.5-822 ==
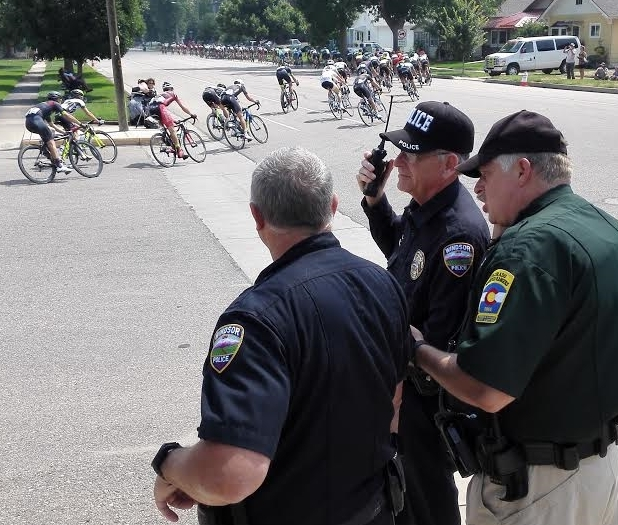
Rangers working alongside local Police Department

In 2012, thanks to a non-partisan effort by the Colorado General Assembly, Governor John Hickenlooper signed Senate Bill 12-072 (Link) into law, formally recognizing the Ranger's role as a Law Enforcement Auxiliary in the Colorado State Statutes.

"Therefore, the general assembly declares that the Colorado Mounted Rangers should be established as an all-volunteer, unpaid auxiliary unit for the purpose of lending assistance to...law enforcement agencies in the state."

Section 24-32-2222 in Senate Bill 12-072 was then harmonized with House Bill 12-1283 and relocated to section 24-33.5-822 placing the Rangers under the Department of Public Safety in 24-33.5 C.R.S.

While the Rangers had been operating under formal memoranda of understanding (MOU's) with agencies across the State, this legislation formalized the Colorado Mounted Rangers' role as the State Law Enforcement Auxiliary and clarified it in the Colorado Revised Statutes.

At their peak, the Colorado Mounted Rangers had a memorandum of understanding with the Colorado Division of Homeland Security and Emergency Management and partnered with dozens of law enforcement and other government agencies including State, County and local agencies.

== Supported agencies ==
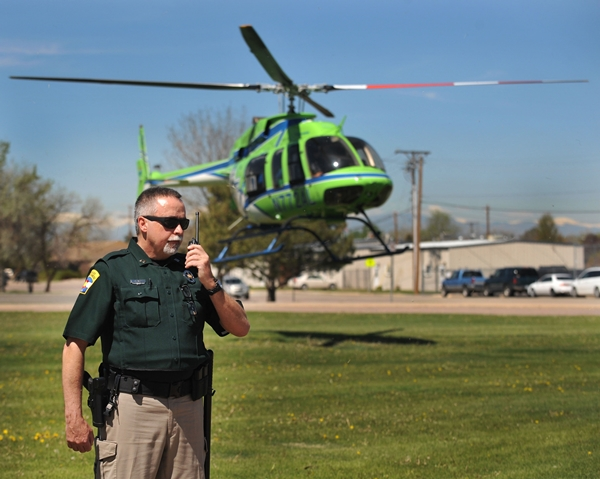
Ranger assists with Air Life Helicopter.

The Colorado Mounted Rangers had an operational Memorandum of Understanding (MOU) with each of the following Law Enforcement, OEM, Fire Agencies and Government entities:

STATE AGENCIES:
- Colorado Division of Homeland Security and Emergency Management

- Auraria Police (University of Colorado at Denver / Metropolitan State University of Denver / Community College of Denver)

- Community College of Aurora

SHERIFFS OFFICES:
- Adams County SO
- Archuleta County SO
- Crowley County SO
- Douglas County SO
- Eagle County SO
- Fremont County SO
- Gilpin County SO
- Kiowa County SO
- La Plata County SO

POLICE DEPARTMENTS:

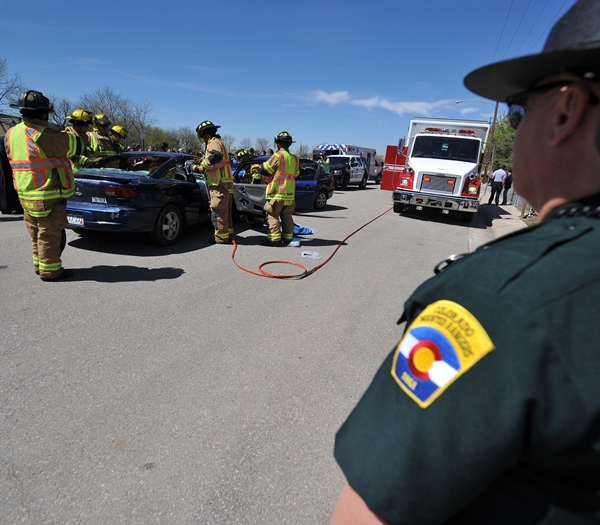
Rangers assisting at an accident scene.

- Aguilar Marshal

- Ault PD
- Commerce City PD
- Dacono PD
- Dillon PD
- Durango PD
- Elizabeth PD
- Empire PD
- Evans PD
- Fairplay PD
- Firestone PD
- Florence PD
- Fort Lupton PD
- Fowler PD
- Frederick PD
- Fountain PD
- Georgetown PD
- Glendale PD
- Greeley PD
- Haxtun PD
- Idaho Springs PD
- Johnstown PD
- Kiowa PD
- LaSalle PD
- Manitou Springs PD
- Milliken PD
- Nederland PD
- Oak Creek PD
- Rocky Ford PD
- Salida PD
- Vail PD
- Windsor PD
- Woodland Park PD

COUNTY GOVERNMENTS:

- Adams County OEM
- Teller County

TOWN / CITY GOVERNMENTS:
- Bayfield
- Dillon
- Elizabeth
- Green Mountain Falls
- Monument
- Ordway
- Palmer Lake
- Ramah

FIRE PROTECTION DISTRICTS:

- Canon City Area FPD

Rangers regularly provided additional personnel to these agencies when requested and acted as peace officers under their memorandum of understanding agreements. Rangers acting under the MOU were under the direction and supervision of the Law Enforcement Agency they were supporting.

== Recognition ==
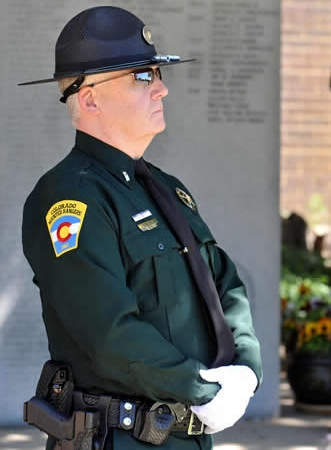
Ranger Honor Guard standing watch at the Colorado Law Enforcement Memorial on the grounds of the Colorado State Patrol Academy

In 1999, fallen Ranger Edward P. Bell's name was enshrined on the Colorado Law Enforcement Memorial which is located on the grounds of the Colorado State Patrol Academy in Golden, Colorado. Ranger Bell is the only Ranger in the over 150-year history of the Rangers to have been killed in the line of duty.

In 2001, the Colorado General Assembly's House of Representatives passed House Resolution 01-1009 to recognize and honor the Colorado Mounted Rangers service to the Citizens of Colorado since the days of the Colorado Territory.

In 2002, the Colorado State Senate passed Senate Resolution 02-008 that recognized the long-standing tradition of honorable service that the Colorado Mounted Rangers have provided since 1861.

In 2004, Governor Bill Owens declared Feb. 21, 2004, "Colorado Mounted Ranger Day" honoring Rangers continuing contributions. Governor Owens also acknowledged the Rangers one time role as the "Governor's Guard".

In 2011, fallen Ranger Edward P. Bell's name was enshrined at the National Law Enforcement Officers Memorial in Washington, D.C. during National Police Week. Rangers made the journey to Washington D.C. to participate in the ceremonies honoring fallen officers from across the United States.

In 2011, United States Senator Michael Bennet recognized the Rangers 150 years of service to the citizens of Colorado. Senator Bennett thanked the Rangers for answering the call to public service.

== See also ==
- Arizona Rangers
- New Mexico Mounted Patrol
- Texas Rangers
- California State Rangers
- Columbine mine massacre
