= Jim La Sala =

American labor union leader

James "Jim" La Sala (November 7, 1926 – October 8, 2022) was an American labor union leader.

Born in New Brunswick, New Jersey, after high school, La Sala joined the United States Navy, and served in World War II. In 1946, he was demobbed, and found work at the Public Service Coordinated Transport of New Jersey, joining the Amalgamated Association of Street, Electric Railway and Motor Coach Employees of America. He quickly became a shop steward, then held various positions in his local union. In 1968, he began working as a representative for the international union, and the following year, he was elected as a vice-president of what had become the Amalgamated Transit Union.

In 1981, La Sala was elected as executive vice-president of the union, and then in 1985 as president. As leader of the union, he promoted labor-management partnership, education, and health and safety. He appointed the first women to serve the union as international representatives and vice-presidents, and supported the formation of the union's women's and Latino caucuses. He led a lengthy strike against Greyhound Lines, and in 1993 personally negotiated with the company's CEO to achieve a resolution.

La Sala served as a vice-president of the AFL-CIO from 1995. He retired in 2003, and died in 2022, at the age of 95.

Trade union offices
Preceded by John W. Rowland	President of the Amalgamated Transit Union; 1985–2003	Succeeded by Warren S. George
