= Dewey C. Bailey =

American politician (1860–1937)

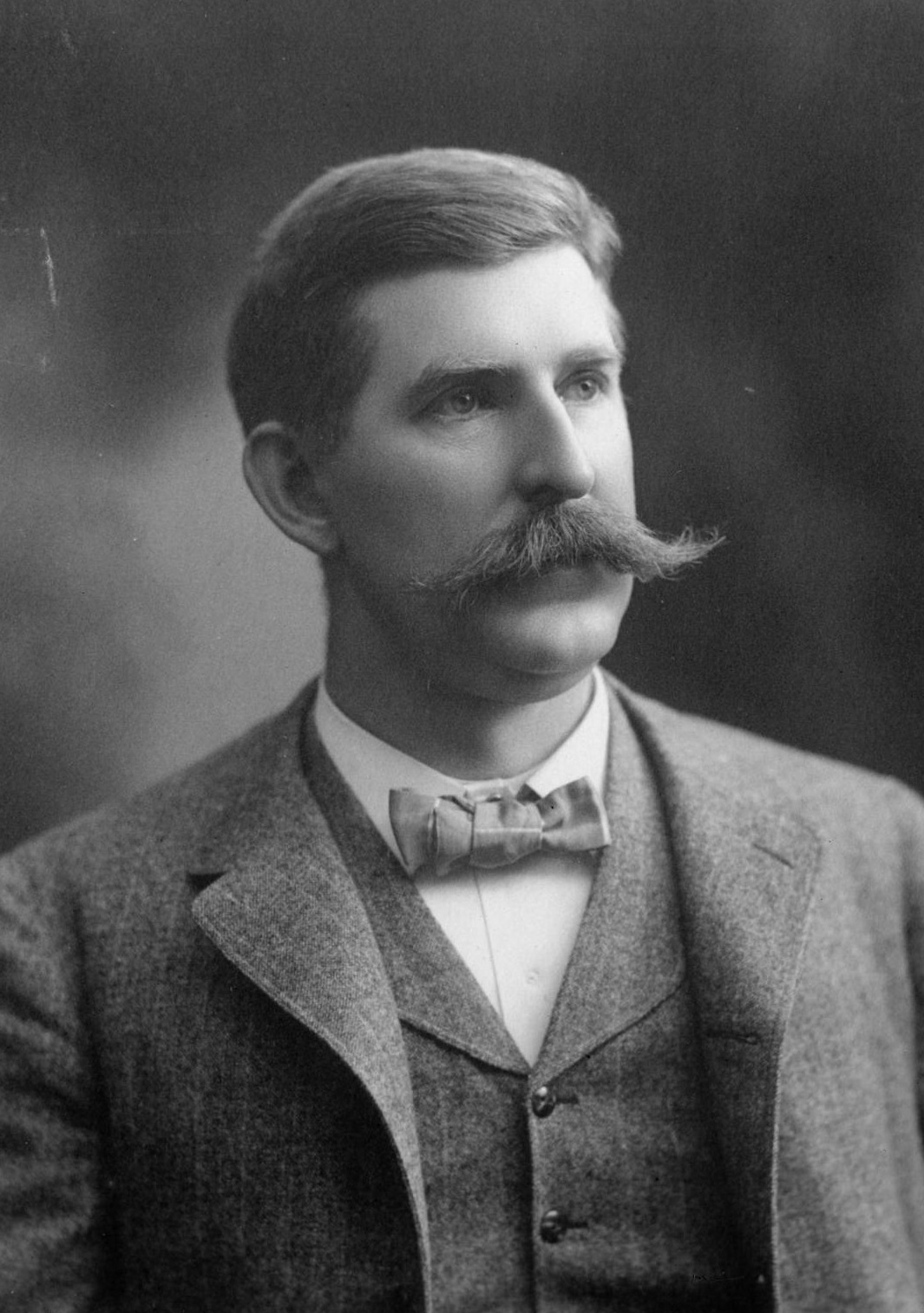
- Baile in 1900

32nd Mayor of Denver
- In office 1919–1923
- Preceded by: William Fitz Randolph Mills
- Succeeded by: Benjamin F. Stapleton

Personal details
- Born: September 1, 1860 Coldwater, Michigan, U.S.
- Died: December 17, 1937 (aged 77) Denver, Colorado, U.S.
- Spouse: Adella Brown Bailey (m. 1880)

Dewey Crossman Bailey (September 1, 1860 – December 17, 1937) was an American politician who served as the Republican mayor of Denver, Colorado from 1919 to 1923. Among the other events of his administration, in August 1920 Denver streetcar workers strike, causing a multi-day riot and requiring the insertion of federal troops.

Before serving as mayor, Bailey was a United States Marshall for Colorado from 1897 to 1915. He died of heart disease in 1937.
