= Cornucopia, Nevada =

- Ghost town
- Location within the state of Nevada
- Coordinates: 41°32′03″N 116°17′34″W
- Country: United States
- State: Nevada
- County: Elko
- Established: 1907
- Time zone: UTC-8 (Pacific (PST))
  - Summer (DST): UTC-7 (PDT)

Cornucopia is an extinct town located in Elko County, Nevada. The town used to be well-known for its mining district area, which was established in 1873. Cornucopia was also known under several names, including Milltown and Kaufmanville.

== History ==
The first settlers in Cornucopia arrived in 1872 and discovered several gold and silver ores in the area. Multiple private toll roads were created in 1873 by the new arrivals, connecting the recently established mining districts with Elko, Independence Valley, Deep Creek, and Winnemucca. Around 1,000 people started residing in the area by the end of 1873.

Lode deposits were discovered after further exploration in the area, and eight mines were dug up in the following months of 1873, with one company, the Leopard Company, controlling three of the eight. Like many other newly established mining districts, the town struggled with the lack of stamp mills, which necessitated the mining companies to ship their ores to other locations such as Mountain City and Winnemucca.

The mining boom era in Cornucopia occurred from 1874 to 1875, with multiple stamp mills erected by local mining companies and the addition of five new mines. It is also within that period that five mines were listed on the San Francisco Stock and Bond Exchange.
