= Elitch =

Elitch (/ˈiːlɪtʃ/ EE-litch) may refer to:

People:

- David Elitch (a.k.a. Dave Elitch), American musician who worked with the American progressive rock band The Mars Volta
- John Elitch (1852–1891), restaurateur, businessman, actor, zookeeper, and original owner of Elitch Gardens and the Elitch Theatre
- Mary Elitch Long (maiden name Hauck) (1856–1936), one of the original owners of Elitch Gardens in Denver, Colorado

Colorado:

- Elitch Gardens, family-owned seasonal amusement park, theater, and botanic garden in northwest Denver, Colorado, United States
- Elitch Gardens Carousel, a 1905 Philadelphia Toboggan Company carousel located in Burlington, Colorado
- Elitch Gardens Theme Park, locally known as "Elitch's", an amusement park in Denver, Colorado
- Elitch Theatre, located at the original Elitch Gardens site in northwest Denver, Colorado

== See also ==
- Delitzsch
- Eldritch (disambiguation)
- Elic (disambiguation)
- Elit (disambiguation)
