= John Elitch =

American businessman (1850–1891)

- John and Mary Elitch
- Born: John Elitch; April 10, 1852; Mobile, Alabama, U.S.
- Died: March 10, 1891 (aged 40); San Francisco, California, U.S.
- Known for: Elitch Gardens
- Spouse: Mary Elizabeth Hauck (m. 1872)

John Elitch Jr. (April 10, 1850 – March 10, 1891) was an American restaurateur, businessman, actor, zookeeper, and original owner and namesake of Elitch Gardens and the Elitch Theatre in Denver, Colorado.

== Early years and marriage ==
John Elitch Jr., originally from Mobile, Alabama, "was a direct decendant [sic] of Stephen Hopkins, a signer of the Declaration of Independence."

The Elitch family eventually moved to Santa Clara, California, where John attended Santa Clara College and worked with his father in a restaurant.

At church, John met a young Mary Elizabeth Hauck and he courted her with daily notes delivered to her by her 10-year-old brother, Edward. Elitch eventually sent a note stating, "I'm going to San Francisco for a job; will you marry me when I come for you?" Mary sent a note back saying "Yes." Mary knew her father would not consent, so in May 1872 the couple eloped and were married in San Jose. She was 16 and he was 22.

In 1872, they settled in San Francisco and John managed the restaurant in the California Theatre, where he met many entertainers and developed his love of the theater.

Elitch and his wife shared a dream to become zookeepers at a resort with a theatre. In 1880, he arrived in Denver, Colorado to work at friends' restaurants saving money. In early 1881, he hiked across the Conejos Range in Colorado to reach the booming town of Durango, Colorado before the train tracks were laid. He opened a very successful restaurant there that he sold to return to Denver, Colorado.

In 1884, Elitch was working at restaurants downtown and he became friends with many of Denver's civic leaders and he was one of the founders of the Denver Athletic Club.

"On August 6, 1886, he opened the Elitch Palace Dining Room, located at 1541 Arapahoe Street. The dining room was the largest in Denver, comfortably seating two hundred persons."

== Elitch's Zoological Gardens ==
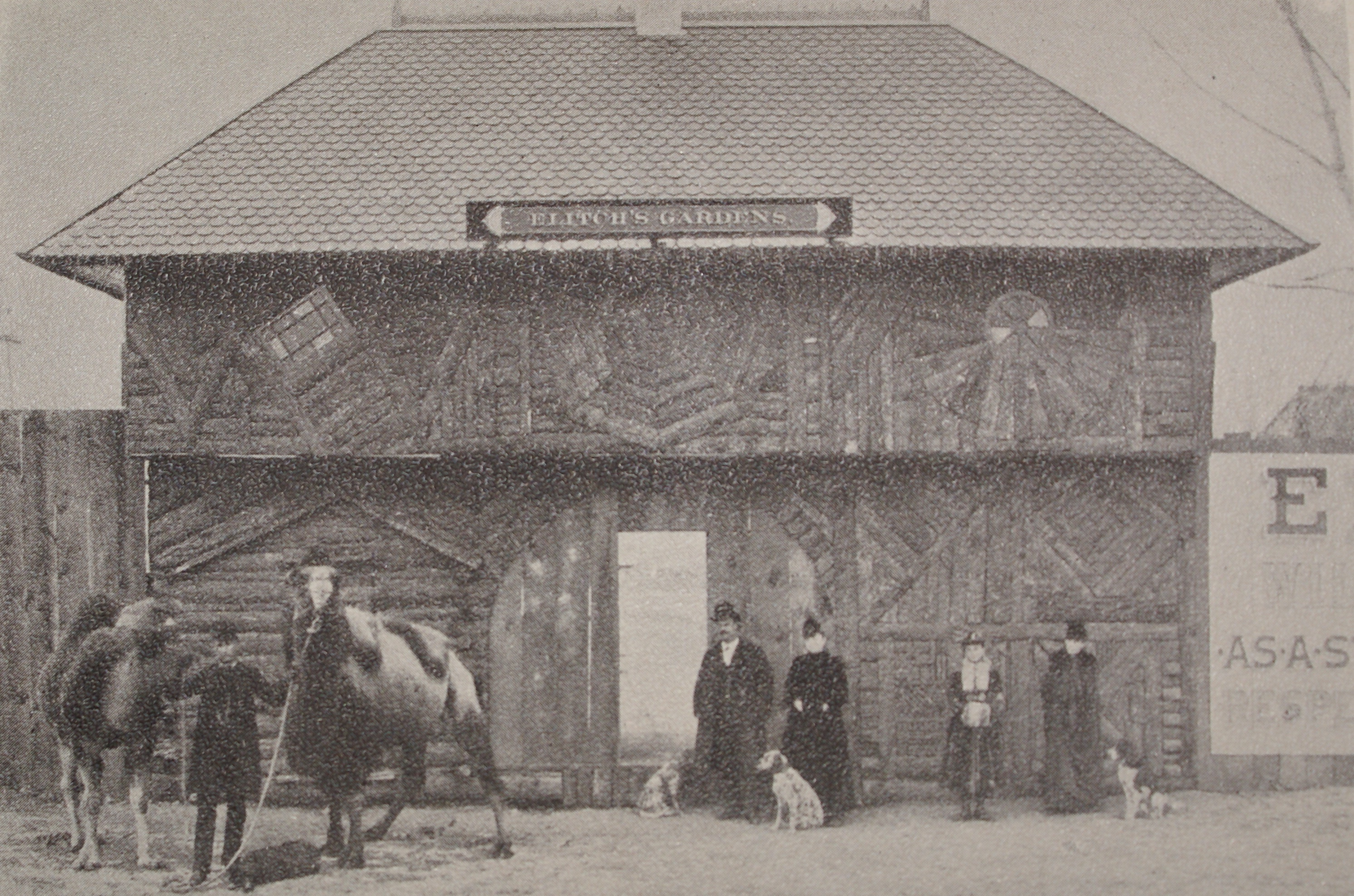
Elitch Zoological Gardens Gate, 1890

After five years of searching, in 1887 John and Mary purchased the 16-acre Chilcott farm in the town of Highland, just West of downtown Denver. Although the farm was intended to supply their restaurant with fresh produce, in 1888 John and Mary sold the restaurant and decided to follow a dream to transform the land into a cultural resort with a zoo, plants, flowers, musicians, and a theater for his entertainment friends. Three years later, they opened the gates to Elitch's Zoological Gardens on May 1, 1890.

Friends of John Elitch were in attendance on opening day including P.T. Barnum, Denver mayor Wolfe Londoner. Elitch Gardens was a huge success that John and Mary poured their hearts and souls into.

After the gates closed for the first season, the work began for the next year. For the winter, John Elitch formed the Elitch, Schilling and Goodyear Minstrels, and toured Colorado and the west coast with a vaudeville act.

Upon reaching San Francisco, John Elitch caught pneumonia and died on March 10, 1891, with Mary at his side. She decided to return to Denver, CO alone and opened the gates to Elitch Gardens, continuing a tradition, in memory of Elitch. In 1897, his widow had Elitch's remains moved from California to Denver, and on September 17, Elitch was buried at Fairmount Cemetery, where Mary would later be buried beside him.

The Historic Elitch Theatre is the only standing building left from opening day. Many of John Elitch's friends came to perform at the Elitch Theatre including James O'Neill, Charles Goodyear, and Sarah Bernhardt after his death. Although the park changed owners, an agreement still stands that it always keep the Elitch name. Mary Elitch Long was allowed to live in her home in the gardens until her death. The original Elitch Gardens closed in 1994 and reopened in its current downtown location in 1995.
