= Mary Elitch Long =

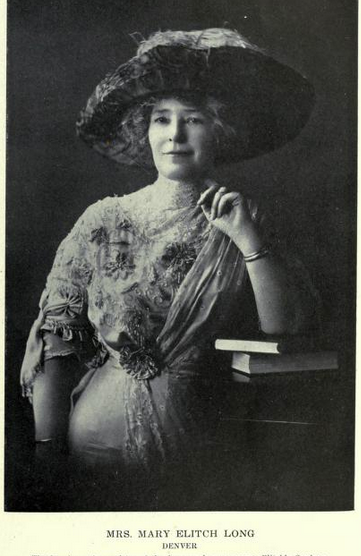
- Born: Mary Elizabeth Hauck; May 10, 1856; Philadelphia, Pennsylvania, U.S.
- Died: July 12, 1936 (aged 80); Denver, Colorado, U.S.
- Burial place: Fairmount Cemetery, Denver, Colorado
- Other names: Mary Elitch; The Gracious Lady of the Gardens; The Lady of the Gardens
- Occupations: Owner and Operator of a Zoo, a Theatre, and a botanic gardens.
- Known for: Elitch Gardens and Elitch Theatre
- Spouse(s): John Elitch (m. 1872-1891; his death); Thomas Long (m. 1900-1920; his death)

Mary Elitch Long (born Mary Elizabeth Hauck; May 10, 1856 – July 16, 1936) was one of the original owners of Elitch Gardens in Denver, Colorado. She was the first woman to own and manage a zoo—the first zoo between Chicago and the west coast—and one of the first women to own and manage a theater (the first Summer stock theatre in the country.) She was an author of two children's books and was inducted into the Colorado Women's Hall of Fame in 1996.

== Early years and marriage to John Elitch ==
Mary Elizabeth Hauck, called Lydia by her family, was born in Philadelphia in 1856. By 1863, her family had settled near Alviso, California, where they were fruit farmers. Alviso, at the southern end of San Francisco Bay, was a boating and shipping port. It was later incorporated into the city of San José and no longer functions as a port.

At church, a young Mary met John Elitch and he courted her with daily notes delivered to her by her 10-year-old brother, Edward. John eventually sent a note stating, "I'm going to San Francisco for a job; will you marry me when I come for you?" Mary sent a note back saying "Yes."

Mary knew her father would not consent, so in May 1872 the couple eloped and were married in San Jose. Mary was just 16 and John was 22. They settled in San Francisco and John managed the restaurant in the California Theatre, where they met many entertainers and developed a love of the theater.

In late 1880 John headed to Denver to open a restaurant and Mary joined him in 1882. "On August 6, 1886, John opened the Elitch Palace Dining Room, located at 1541 Arapahoe Street. The dining room was the largest in Denver, comfortably seating two hundred persons."

After five years of searching, in 1887 John and Mary purchased the 16-acre Chilcott farm in the town of Highland, just West of downtown Denver. They also purchased nearby Berkeley Lake as a companion resort to the farm. Although the farm was intended to supply their restaurant with fresh produce, in 1888 John and Mary sold the restaurant and decided to follow a dream to transform the land into a cultural resort with a zoo, plants, flowers, musicians, and a theater for his entertainment friends. Three years later, they opened the gates to Elitch's Zoological Gardens on May 1, 1890.

== Opening of the Gardens ==
On May 1, 1890, the Elitches opened their Elitch's Zoological Gardens and Grand Pavilion Theatre to the public. Many famous friends were in attendance on opening day including P.T. Barnum, actor James O'Neill, Denver Mayor Wolfe Londoner, Colorado senators Edward O. Wolcott and Horace Tabor.

John and Mary had a very successful year, clearing some $35,000 (or $775,000 in present-day dollars), so John organized a traveling show, the Goodyear, Elitch & Shilling minstrel troupe to tour through the winter. The troupe played in many Colorado theatres before moving on to California, where John contracted pneumonia and died on March 10, 1890, leaving Mary a 35-year-old widow.

== Lady of the Gardens ==
After John's passing, Mary assumed management of the park and ran the zoo, the gardens and the theatre.

For the 1893 summer season, Elitch Gardens employed the Frank Norcross Company. It was the first full-length season of summer stock. The first stock play presented at Elitch Theatre was Nancy and Company by Augustin Daly. It opened on June 10, 1893.

1896 was the second stock season and J. H. Huntley was signed to direct the resident stock company, headed by leading actress Jennie Kennark. The season opened with the play, Rosedale, by Lester Wallack.

In 1900, she married Thomas Long. In 1916, she was forced to sell Elitch Gardens to John Mulvihill. In the agreement the park would keep the Elitch name, Mary Elitch Long would be allowed to continue living in her bungalow on the property, earning $50 a month allowance, plus two boxes at the Elitch Theatre were always reserved for her and her friends. Thomas Long died in an automobile accident in 1920.

== Later years and death ==
She lived in the gardens until the last years of her life, when she moved across the street to live with family. She died on July 16, 1936, aged 80.

"Mary Elitch with her bear cubs
