= Elitch Theatre =

Historic theater in Denver, Colorado, USA

- U.S. National Register of Historic Places
- Colorado State Register of Historic Properties
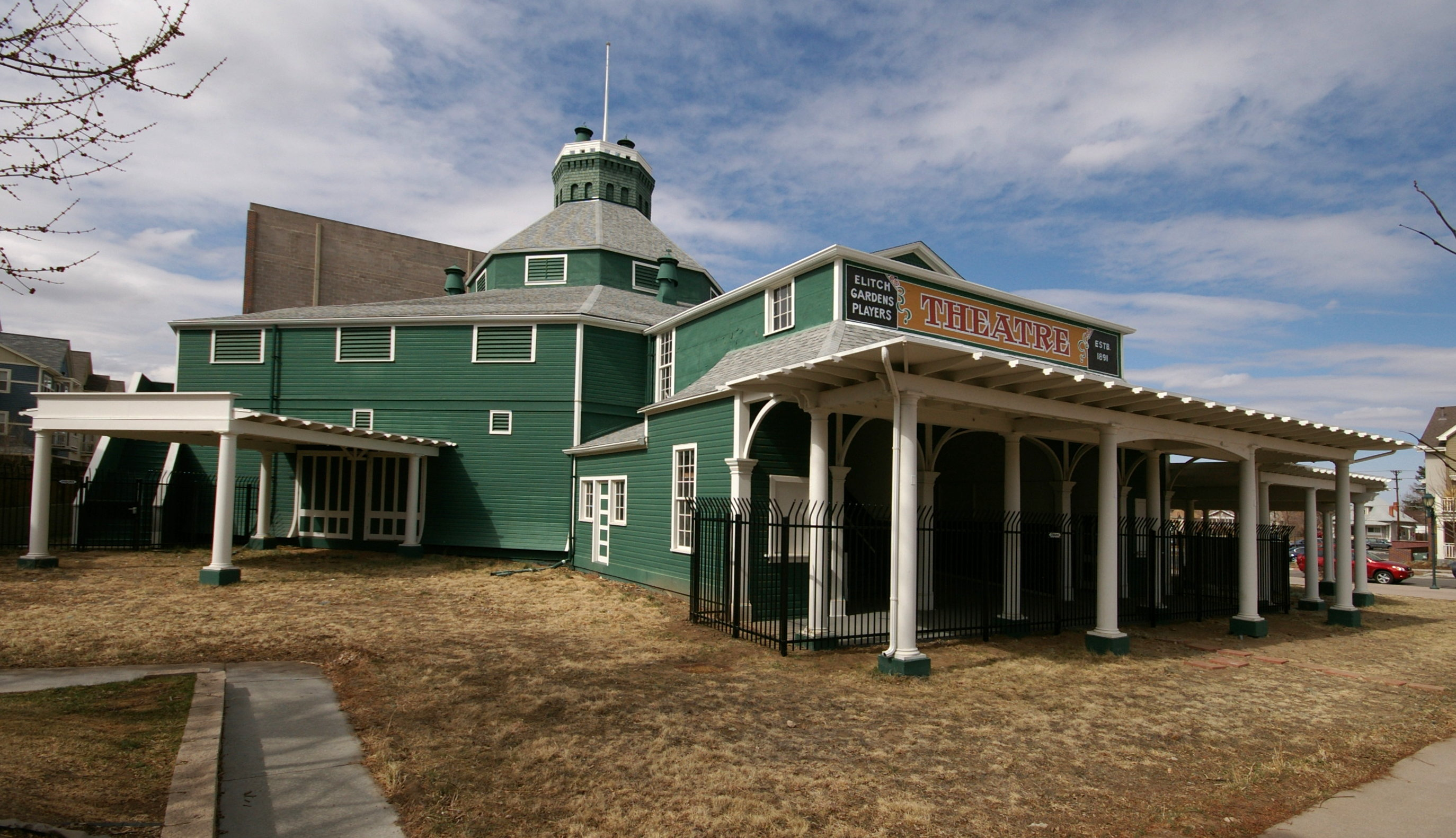

- Location within Colorado Location within the United States
- Location: W. 38th Ave. and Tennyson St., Denver, Colorado
- Coordinates: 39°46′6″N 105°2′46″W
- Area: Highlands
- Built: 1890
- Architects: Lee & Liden
- Architectural style: Stick/Eastlake, Shingle Style
- NRHP reference No.: 78000844
- CSRHP No.: 5DV.143
- Added to NRHP: March 21, 1978

Elitch Theatre, as it appeared in 1923

The Historic Elitch Theatre is a summer stock theatre located at the original Elitch Gardens site in northwest Denver, Colorado. Opened in 1890, it was Denver's first professional theatre, serving as the home to America's first and oldest summer-stock theatre company from 1893 until the 1960s. The first films in the western US were shown there in 1896. Cecil B. DeMille sent yearly telegrams wishing the theatre another successful season, calling it "one of the cradles of American drama."

== History ==
John Elitch and Mary Elitch Long first opened Elitch Gardens on May 1, 1890, with animals, bands, flowers, and an open-air theatre where Denver Mayor Wolfe Londoner spoke. Inspired by Shakespeare's Globe Theatre, the first shows were vaudeville acts by accomplished local and national performers. In 1891, the theatre was enclosed and rebuilt for $100,000. The Boston Opera Company performed musicals and light opera, starting with The Pirates of Penzance. In 1893, the first summer stock theatre company, the Norcross Company, was organized in the East and brought to the gardens. Vaudeville shows continued until 1900.

In 1896, Edison's Vitascope was exhibited at the theatre showing the first film in Colorado.

The Elitch Gardens Stock Theatre Company began performing in 1897 under the management of Mary Elitch Long. Its first season in 1897 opened with leading man James O'Neill, who had promised John that he would act in the new theatre when it was ready. The first show performed there was Helene. The company became known for putting on ten plays in a ten-week summer season and attracting internationally known stars of the theatre and screen.

Sarah Bernhardt came to Denver in 1906 after the San Francisco earthquake destroyed the California Theatre where she was scheduled to perform. At Elitch's, she played Camille at the matinée and LaSorcier at night. Douglas Fairbanks was hired into the same company. Prior to that, in 1905, he was hired to sweep the stage for theatre tickets.

Operating the park became too costly for Mary Elitch. With the purchase of Elitch Gardens by John Mulvihill in 1916, she relinquished control of the Gardens and theatre. Two theatre boxes remained reserved for her and her friends. Mulvihill oversaw the theatre until his death in 1930 and was succeeded by his son-in-law Arnold Gurtler.

In 1953, the Elitch Theatre was used to film scenes for The Glenn Miller Story.

The Elitch Garden Theatre Company became its own incorporated business, separate from the Elitch Gardens Park, renting the theatre in 1963. The company stopped operating as a traditional resident summer-stock, switching to single, star-packaged shows from New York. The company had many successful years, but as time and culture changed, the theatre building was neglected.

The park's Trocadero Ballroom was bulldozed in 1975. Fearing a similar fate, the community added the theatre to the National Register of Historic Places in 1976.

The Elitch Theatre Company's last season was in 1987. The park booked the "Incredible Acrobats of China" for a season.In 1988 thru 1991 the theatre held a concert series with 6 individual concerts per season. World rfamous musicians graced the stage. Ray Charles performed stating that the acoustics were amazing and couldnt believe that the theatre was almost 100 yrs old. Other groups who b played through the series were. Emmy Lou Harris, Air Supply, New Grass Revival, Dr. John, Riders in the Sky, Jessie Collin Young and many more. The Elitch Gardens Company officially closed in 1991.

The Robber Bridegroom was performed with Patrick Cassidy for the theatre's centennial anniversary. Directed by Gary Geim a stage and screen actor from Denver and who first performed at the theatre at the age of 16.

A celebration took place at the amusement park for the historic event. Many alumni attended the festivites including Raymond Burr, Mary Jo Catlett, Gavin MacLeod. The theatre received many congratulation letters and calls from the alumni who could not attend including Debnie Reynolds and Mitzi Gaynor.

Actor Raymond Burr who was one of the alumni in attendance for the 100 year celebration raised $2 million for an educational program at the theatre. The money was instead donated to the local Cole Middle School Performing Arts school.

The Elitch Gardens amusement park moved to the current central Platte Valley location in 1994. The new $94 million park was opened in 1995, with attendance reaching one million.

In 1994 an effort to preserve the theatre began. The Friends of the Elitch Theatre (FOHET) was formed by Debbie Roth the last manager of the theatre, Cynthia Soroka an artist who created the poster for the 100th anniversary, Gary Geim and Randy West the producers and directors of the Robber Bridegroom.

Through extensive fund raising and media campaigns with local and state politicians supporting the efforts of FOHET the theatre was designated a Colorado landmark building in 1996, which ensured that the legacy would be carried on. Fires in 1995 on the old Gardens property near the theatre caused public outcry for additional security. The original Elitch property was sold to Perry Rose LLC in 1996 with the conditions that the theatre and carousel shell never be demolished.

In 2011, Barbara Medill, a friend of Mary Elitch Long, donated some of Long's possessions to the Historic Elitch Gardens Theatre Foundation, including an engraved silver table setting. Around the same time, the hand-painted decorative historic "Ann Hathaway" (sp) curtain, (oil on canvas: 1894), was removed from its original wooden bats and stored for construction work. After years of neglect and severe water damage, the curtain was rolled and stored in a backstage room at the theatre. (The curtain had Anne Hathaway's name spelled as "Ann".)

After a massive volunteer cleanup, the interior was opened for Doors Open Denver in April 2012. Musicians and Shakespearean performers were the first acts on stage in the 22 years since the building closed.

In 2016, representatives from Curtains Without Borders, a non-profit organization promoting proper storage etiquette of antiquated theatre curtains and drapes, gave a lecture at the Elitch Theatre about theatre grand drapes and curtains. They were asked to review the Elitch Theatre's "Ann Hathaway" grand drape and consult on its restoration. The drape was removed from storage and unrolled by CWB representatives and theatre volunteers who discovered improper storage. The drape was illegible, and the paint dissolved into dust as the curtain was unrolled. The curtain was displayed on the backstage theatre floor for lecture attendees to view. Those who regarded it as a piece of Colorado history were devastated that it had been destroyed by time and neglect.

In 2018, the outdoor films and summer children's programming at the theater were cancelled due to $800,000 in damages caused by wind and a hail storm.

== Restoration ==
The theatre closed in 1991 and sat empty for the next 11 years.

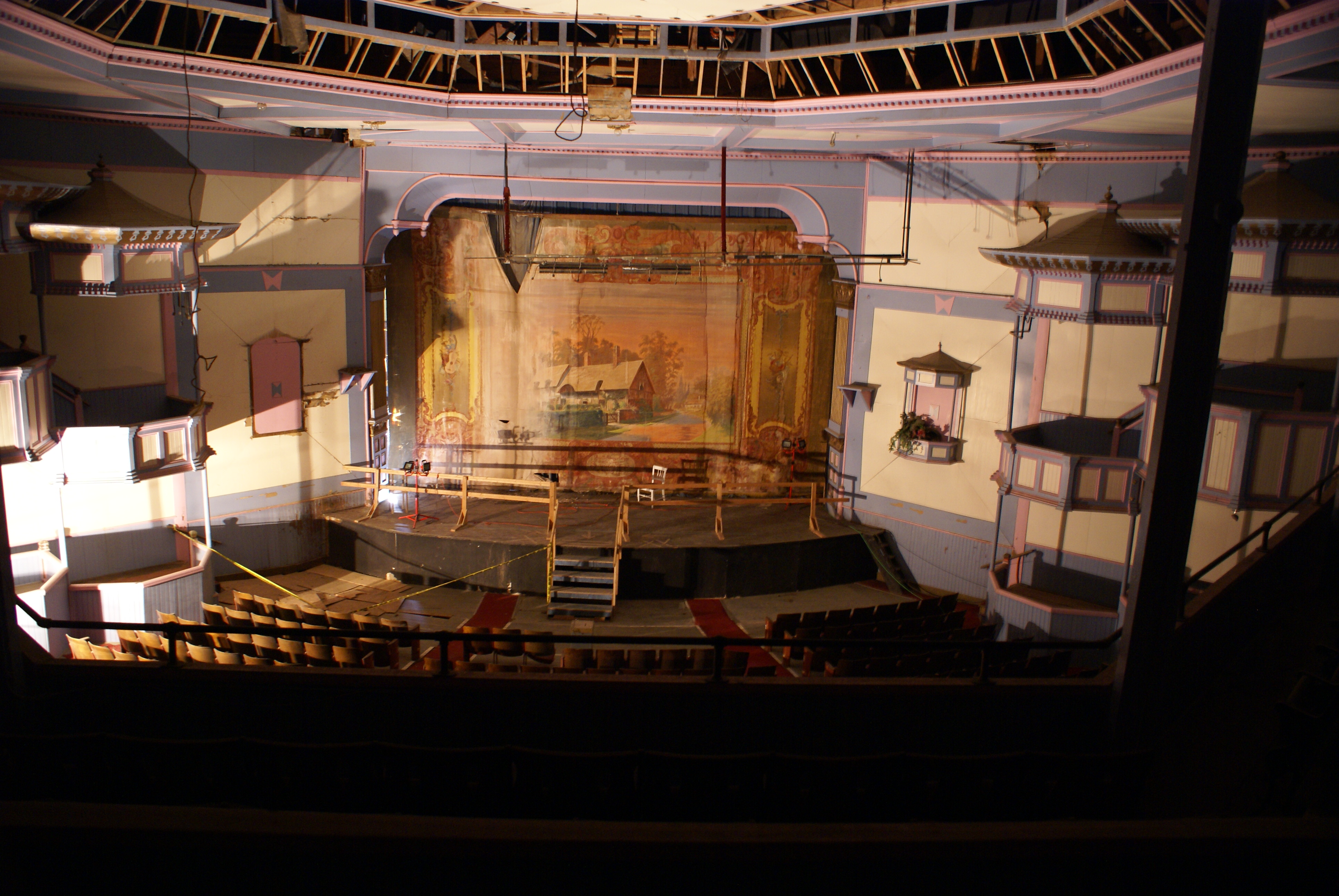
Interior of the Historic Elitch Gardens Theatre, June 2010

A nonprofit organization, the Historic Elitch Gardens Theatre Foundation, was formed in 2002 to raise funds, maintain, preserve, and restore the theatre and carousel pavilion. In 2006, the Foundation received $5 million in federal, state, and city funding, plus grants and private donations, and work began on Phase 1 to save and restore the historic exterior. The groundbreaking for the renovation of the theatre began with restoring the building's exterior, including a concrete foundation under the exterior walls. The roof, gable, main entrance/lobby, and exterior walls were replaced and painted. A section of dressing rooms and shops on the West side of the building was demolished. Exterior restoration on the historic auditorium was completed in 2007.

Phase 2 of the restoration (2013-2014) included various health and safety upgrades, including restoring electricity and lighting throughout the building and the addition of a fire suppression system. This upgrade allowed the theatre to implement temporary occupancy and begin tours and limited events.

With the completion of Phase 3 (2020-2021), restrooms were added, a new roof was installed, and various other upgrades were made, allowing for the theatre to implement permanent occupancy.

In summer 2022, the Foundation offered select free outdoor movie showings. In summer 2023, the interior had been sufficiently restored for a series of indoor movies and tours. By late 2023, the Foundation had high hopes for its Phase 4 progress, expecting to offer live shows in summer 2024, albeit without full lighting, rigging, and sound. Opening the 400 balcony seats is part of Phase 5.

Fundraising continues for interior renovations, including the need for theatre rigging, lighting, and sound. The plan is to reopen as a multimedia performing arts complex for the community, offering education, film, live music, and theatre.

== Stars who appeared at The Elitch Theatre ==
- Steve Allen, 1974
- Morey Amsterdam, 1968
- Eve Arden, 1965
- Cliff Arquette, 1966
- George Arliss, 1905–06, '13
- John Astin, 1973–74
- Sarah Bernhardt, 1906
- Beulah Bondi, 1925–26
- Shirley Booth, 1968
- Helen Bonfils, 1934–59
- Joe E. Brown, 1963
- Raymond Burr, 1944
- Sid Caesar, 1971, '74
- Kitty Carlisle, 1965, '70
- Jon Cypher, 1958
- Cecil B. DeMille, 1905
- Brandon deWilde, 1972 ***
- Patty Duke, 1973–74
- Douglas Fairbanks, 1905
- Douglas Fairbanks Jr., 1971–73
- Maude Fealy, 1896, 1903, 1904, 1907, 1909, 1917
- Jose Ferrer, 1973
- Minnie Maddern Fiske 1905, 1907–08
- Arlene Francis, 1964–65, '69
- Mitzi Gaynor, 1987
- Barbara Bel Geddes, 1964
- George Gobel, 1971
- Karen Grassle, 1972
- Julie Harris, 1978
- Mimi Hines, 1965, 1968, 1970
- Kim Hunter, 1975
- Gabe Kaplan, 1982–83
- Grace Kelly, 1951
- Cloris Leachman, 1982–83
- Harold Lloyd, 1914
- Myrna Loy, 1969
- Fredric March, 1926–28
- Enid Markey, 1942
- David McCallum, 1976, 1983
- Jayne Meadows, 1974
- Patricia Neal, 1947
- Maureen O'Sullivan, 1972, '82-83
- Walter Pidgeon, 1964
- Antoinette Perry, 1904–05
- Howard Platt, 1968, 1984
- Jane Powell, 1981
- Tyrone Power, 1905
- Vincent Price, 1979
- Rosemary Prinz, 1968, 1977
- John Raitt, 1977, 1979
- Robert Redford, 1955
- Lynn Redgrave, 1975, 1977
- Debbie Reynolds 1986
- Edward G. Robinson, 1922
- Ginger Rogers, 1975
- Cesar Romero, 1964
- Mickey Rooney, 1972–74
- William Shatner, 1975, 1980
- Stephen Stills, 1991
- Haila Stoddard, 1953, 1975, 1983
- Gloria Swanson, 1967
- Constance Towers, 1969
- Ernest Truex, 1903, 1904, 1906
- Lana Turner, 1977
- Joan Van Ark, 1960
- Dick Van Patten, 1968
- Abe Vigoda, 1983
- Helen Ware, 1912
- Nancy Walker, 1987
- Blanche Walsh, 1901
- David Warfield, 1908
- Paxton Whitehead, 1979
- Shelley Winters, 1973, 1983
- Donald Woods (actor), 1933–32, 1939, 1941, 1947–48
- Jane Wyatt, 1939

*** Brandon deWilde died in a motor vehicle accident in Lakewood, Colorado, days after his final performance at the theatre.

== Gallery ==
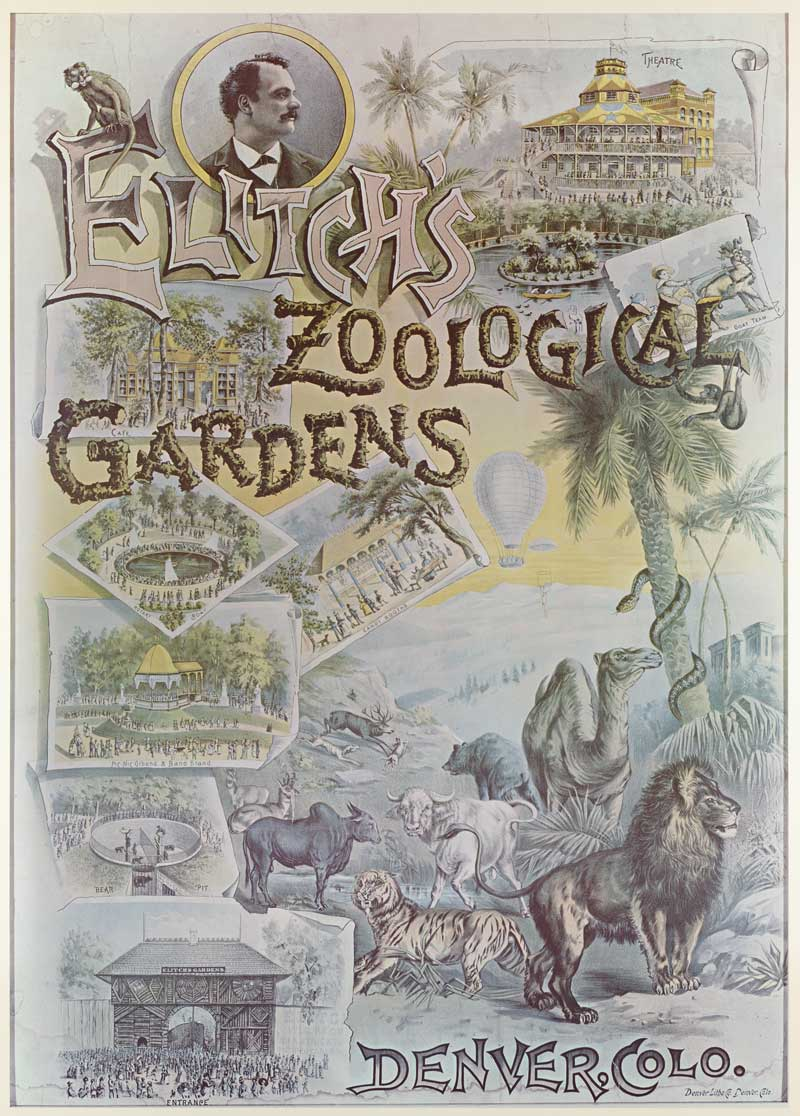
Elitch's Zoological Gardens poster (cir.1900)

John and Mary Elitch

The lobby/entrance to the theatre with photos of actors who appeared at the theatre. c. 1930–1940.

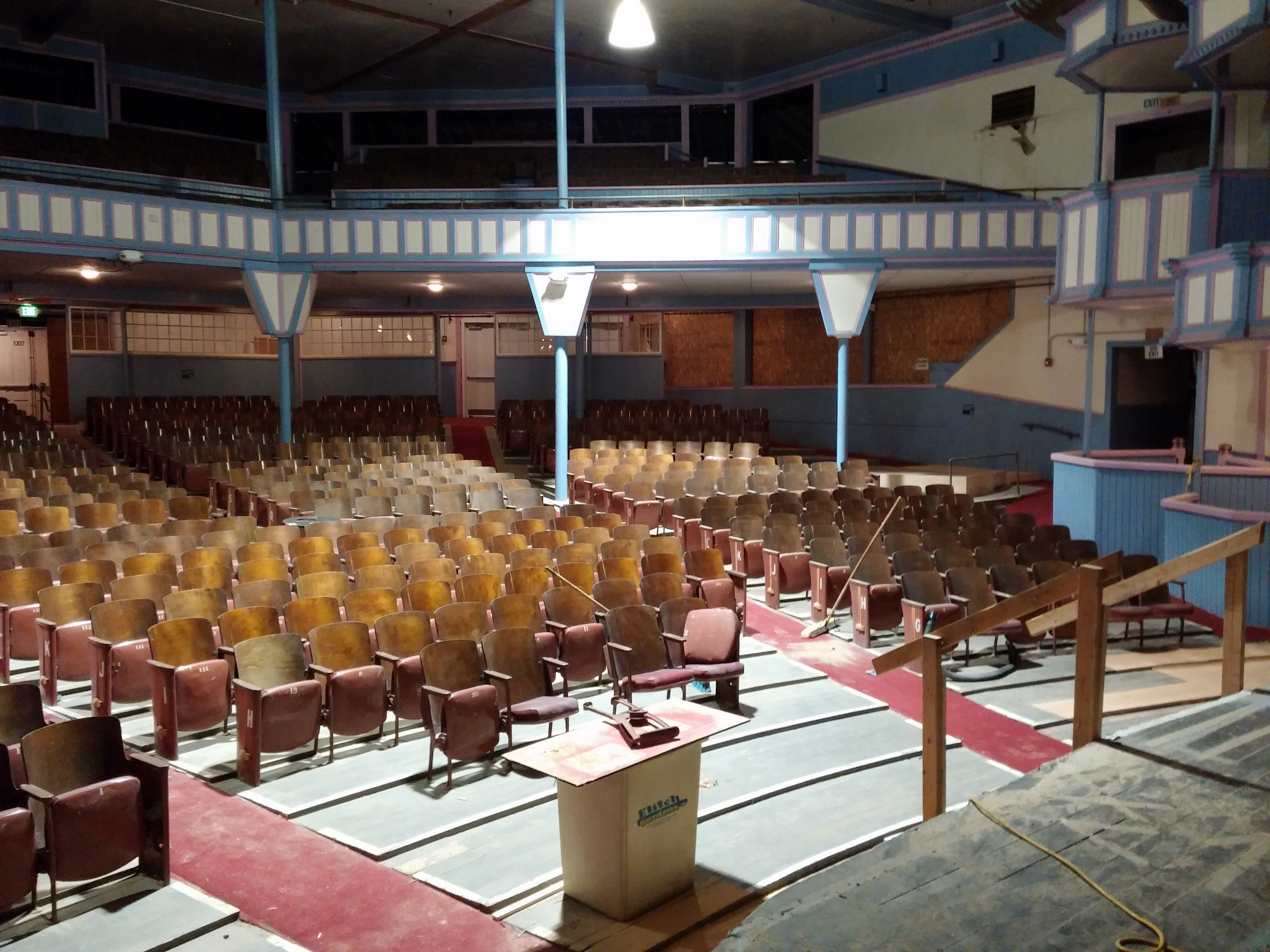
Interior of theatre during Phase 2 restoration, December 2013

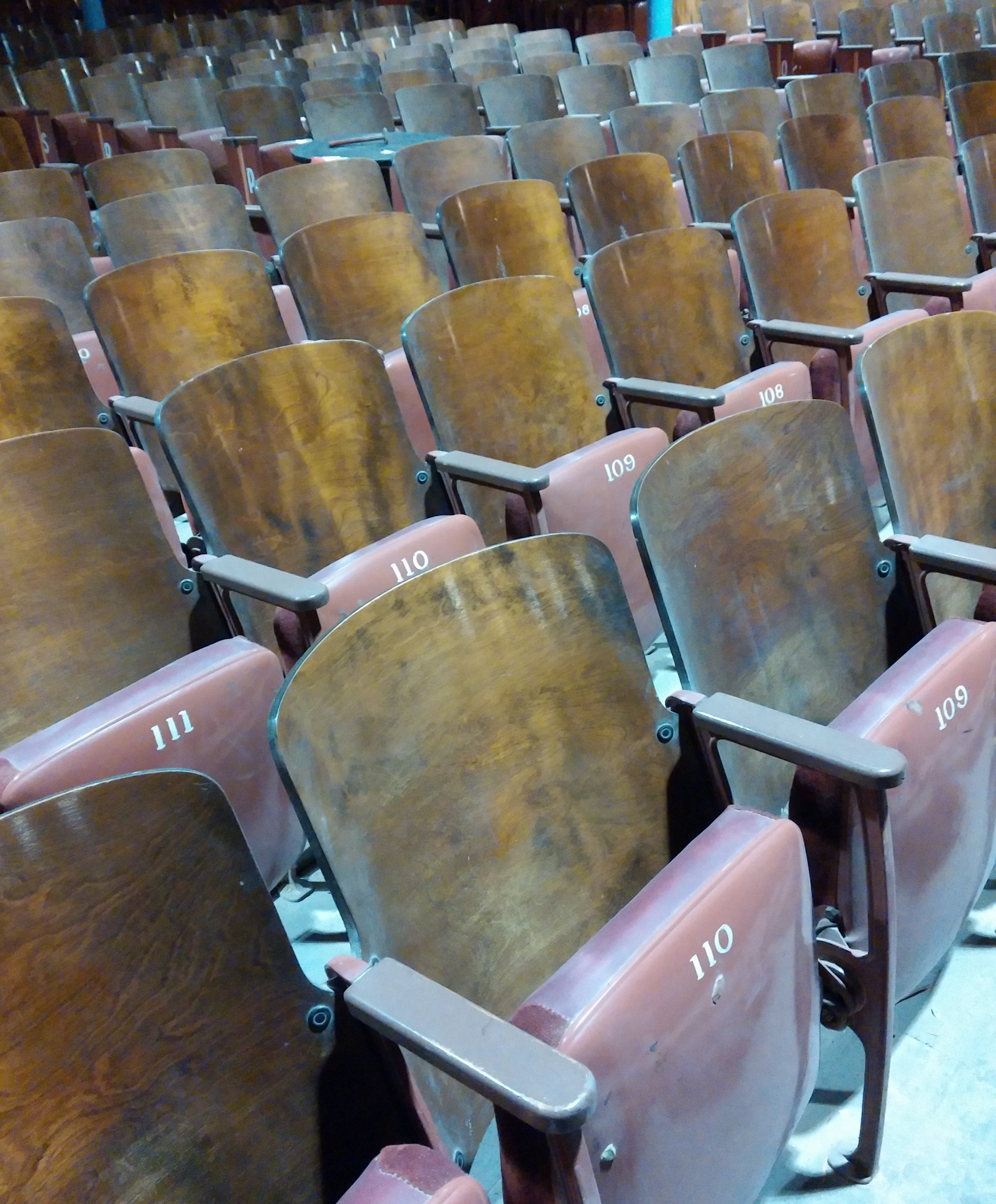
Orchestra level chairs (2013)

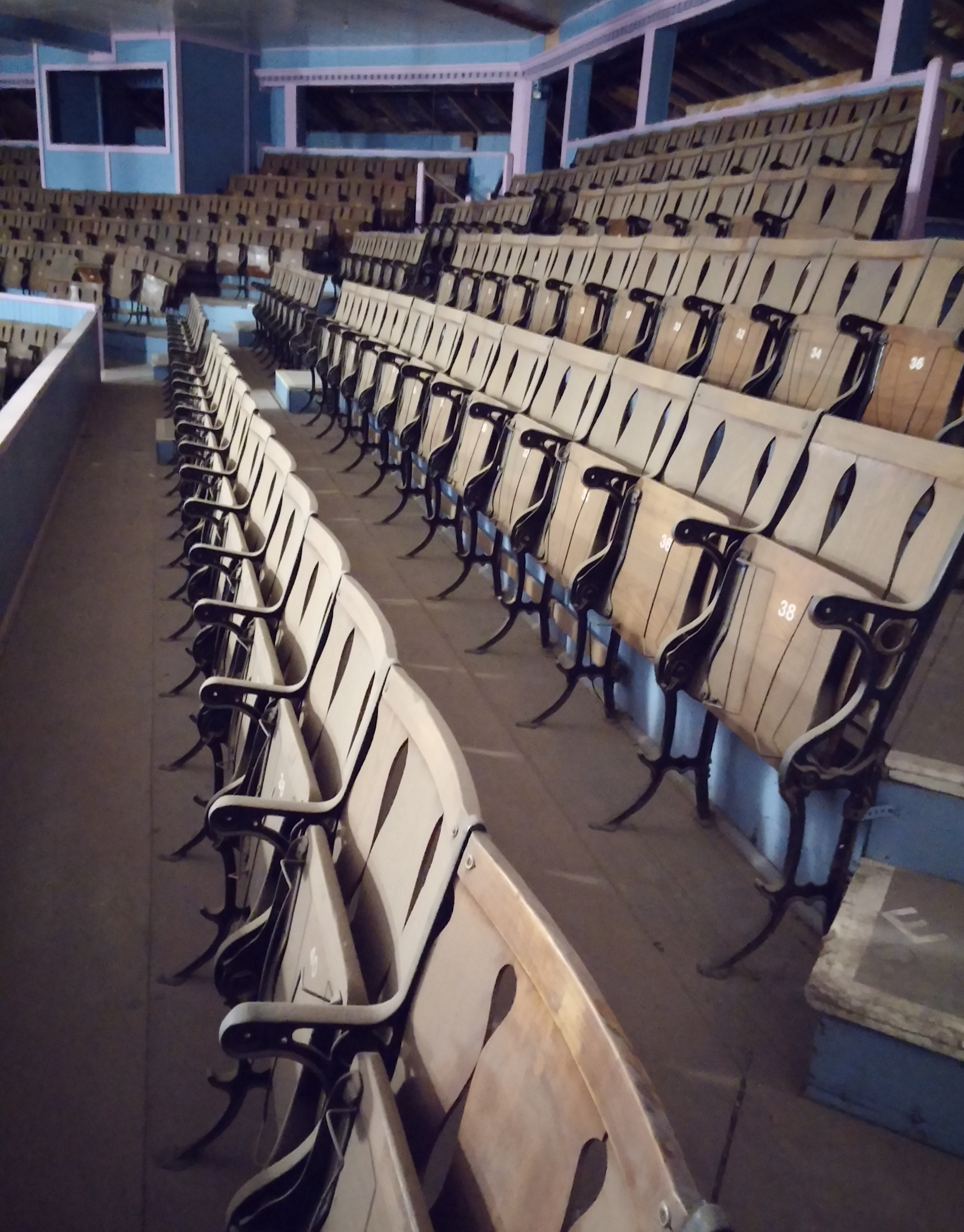
Original balcony chairs remain today. (2014)

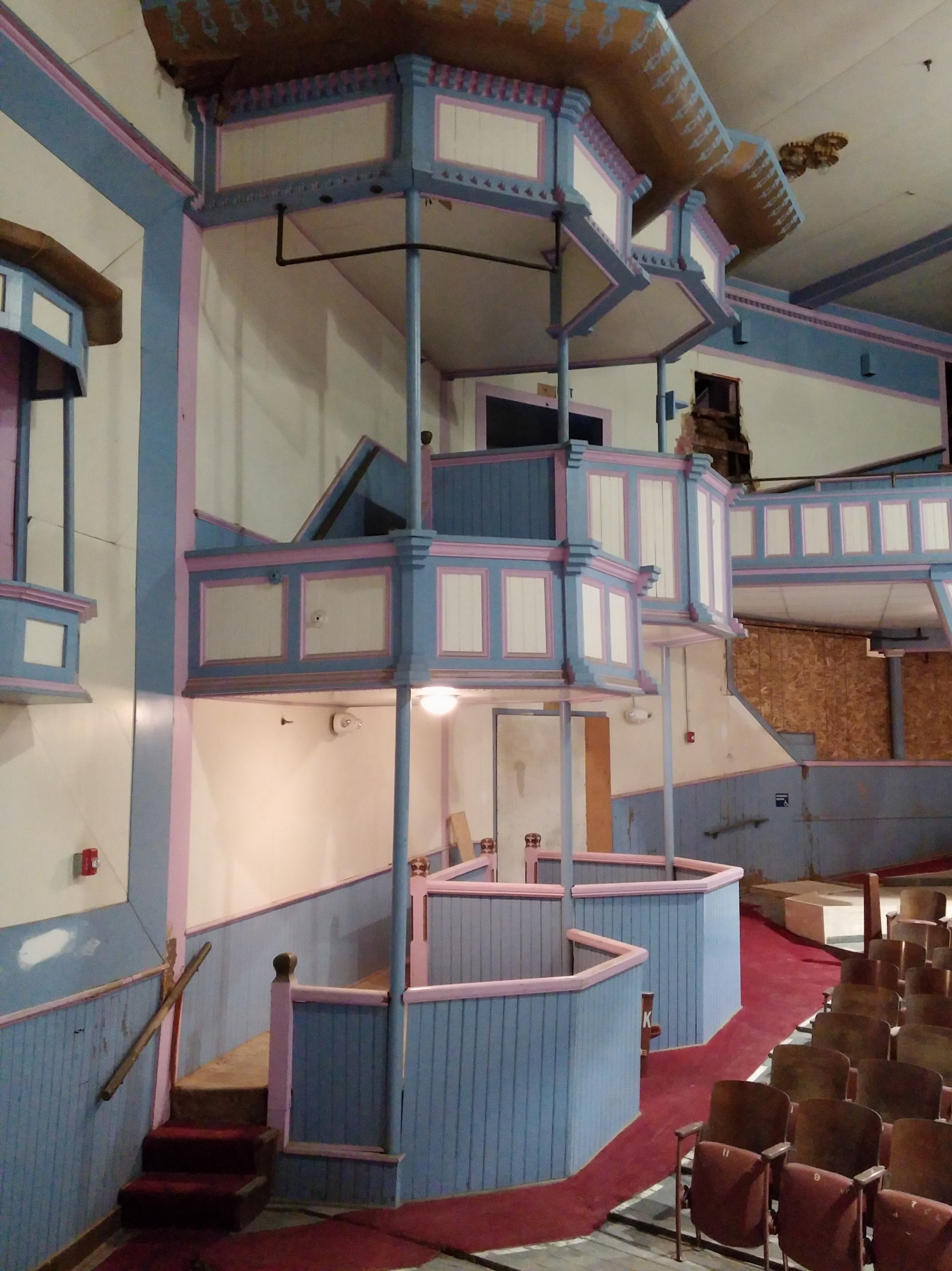
Box seats (2014)

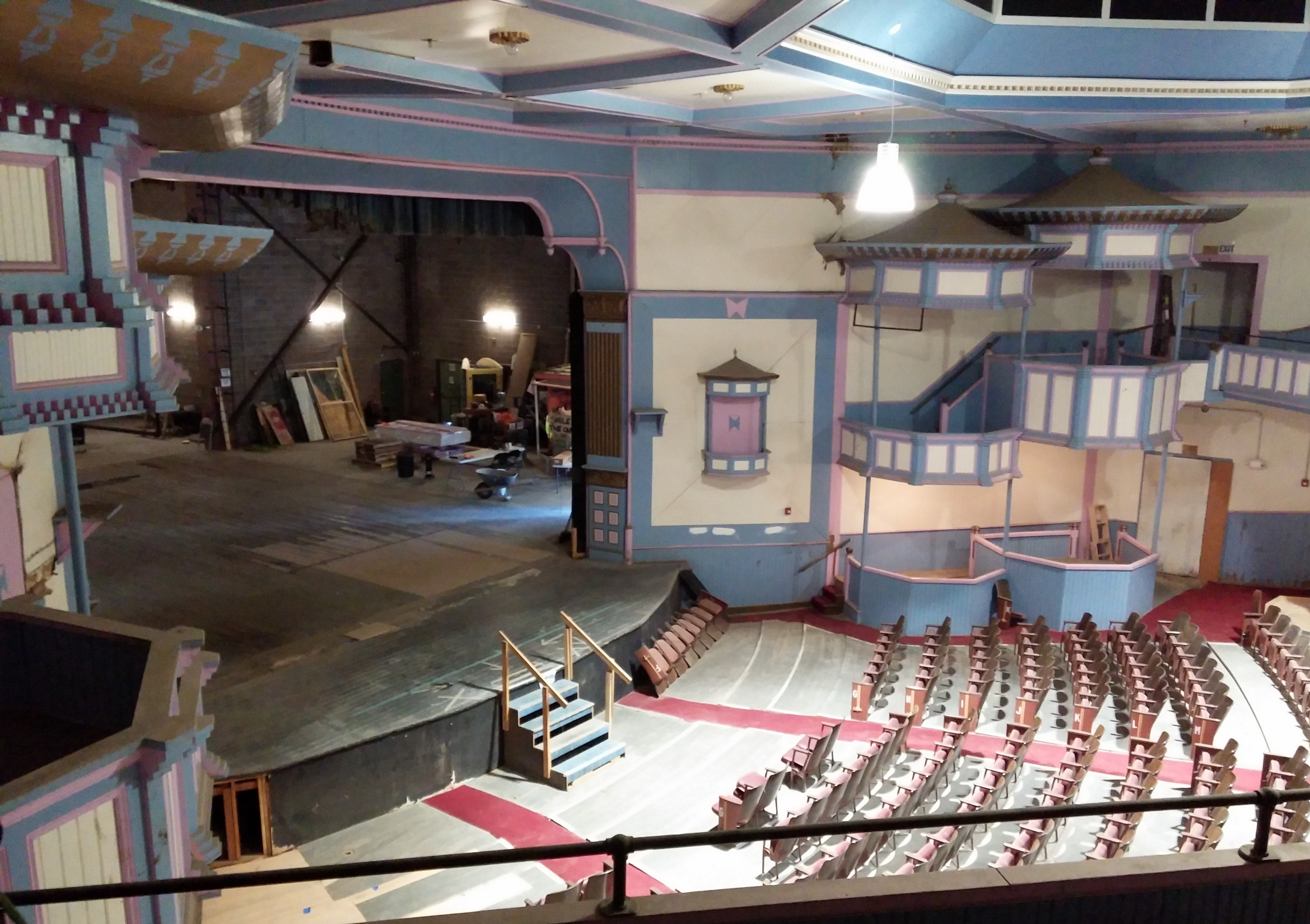
View of the stage from the balcony (2014)
