= Elic =

Elic or ELIC may refer to:

- Elic Ayomanor (born 2003), American football player
- Elic, Kentucky, an unincorporated community in Knott County
- Executive Life Insurance Company
