= Elitch Gardens =

Defunct amusement park, theater, and garden

- Previously known as Elitch's Zoological Gardens
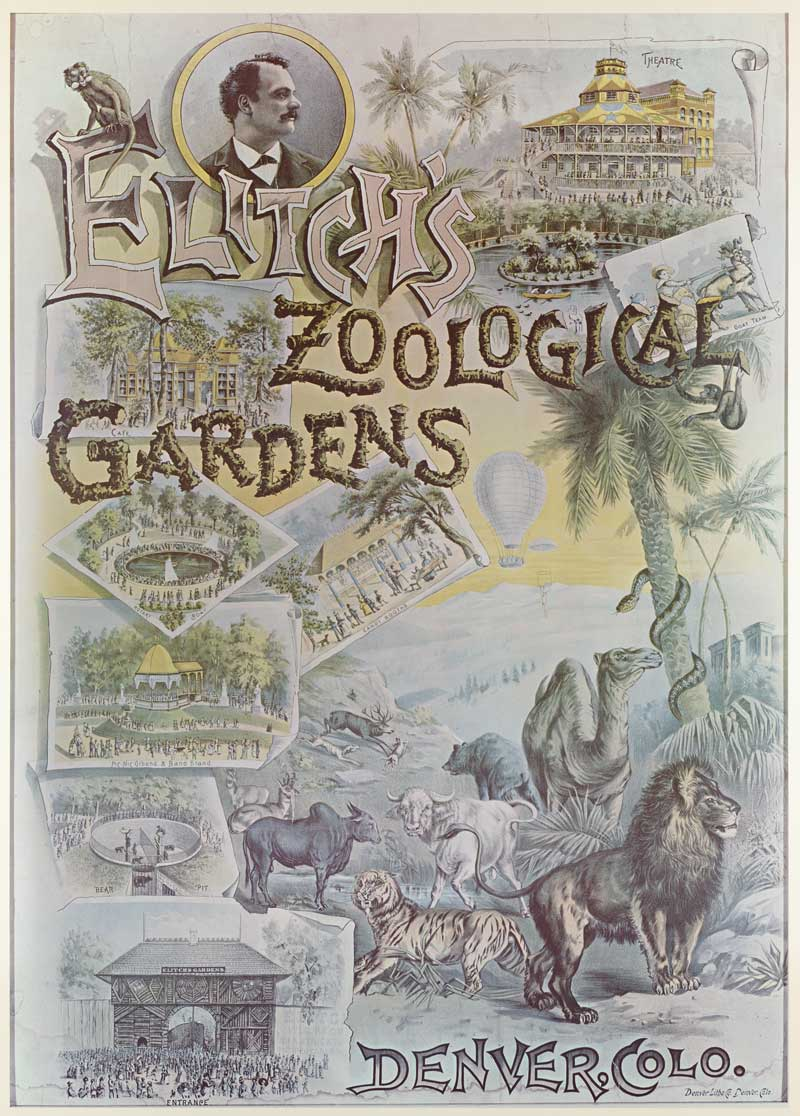
- Poster for Elitch's Zoological Gardens (c. 1900)
- Interactive map of Elitch Gardens
- Location: Denver, Colorado, U.S.
- Coordinates: 39°46′05″N 105°02′48″W
- Opened: May 1, 1890
- Closed: October 1, 1994
- Owner: John Elitch and Mary Elitch Long (1890–1916); John Mulvihill (1916–1930); Gurtler family (1930–1995); Elitch Gardens (1995–2014)
- Slogan: Not to See Elitch's is Not to See Denver
- Area: 28 acres (110,000 m^{2})

Attractions
- Total: 37
- Roller coasters: 5
- Water rides: 2

Elitch Gardens was a family-owned seasonal amusement park, theater, and botanic garden in the West Highland neighborhood in northwest Denver, Colorado, United States, at 38th Avenue and Tennyson Street. For more than a century Elitch's was one of the most popular entertainment destinations in Colorado. It was nationally known for its luscious gardens, the Elitch Theatre, the Trocadero Ballroom, and the premier wooden roller coaster, Mister Twister. The park moved to downtown Denver in 1994, and later in November 1998 became Six Flags Elitch Gardens (now simply Elitch Gardens once again). The former location has been redeveloped.

== Early history ==
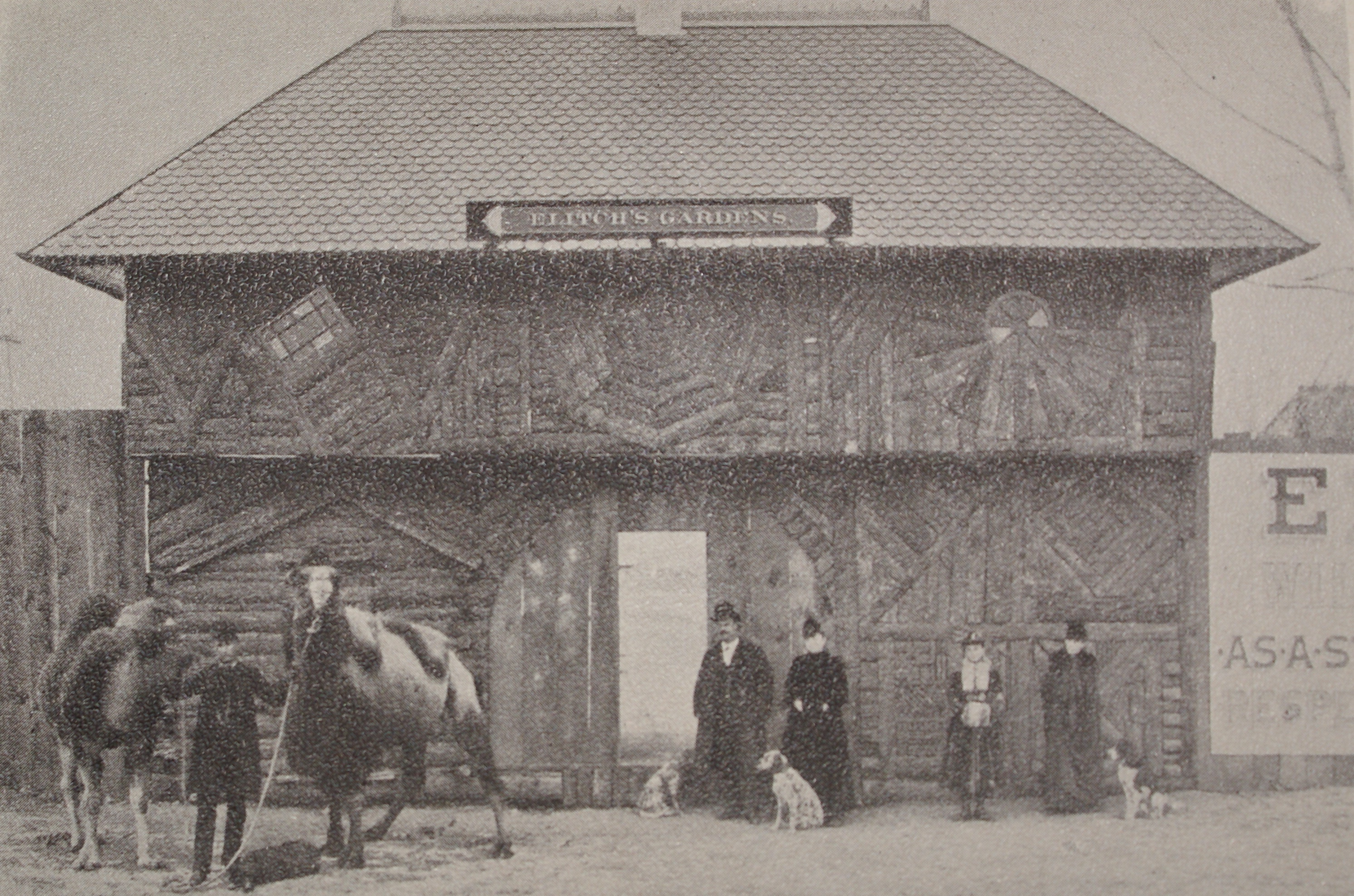
Elitch Zoological Gardens Gate, 1890

Elitch Gardens Theatre, 1923.

Elitch's Zoological Gardens opened May 1, 1890, on 16 acres (6.5 ha) of former farmland bought by John Elitch and Mary Elitch. It was the first zoo west of Chicago, and it offered the Denver community a unique cultural experience.

Mary Elitch Long managed the park for 26 years following John's death in 1891. Mary Elitch was the first woman to own and manage a zoo, and "until the opening of the Denver City Park Zoo, Elitch was the only zoological gardens between Chicago and the West Coast." One of the bears was famous for dancing a waltz when the band played.

The Elitch Theatre (1890) became home to the oldest summer stock theater in the country starting in 1893 and continuing to entertain until it closed in 1991. The building was the site of the first films exhibited in Colorado when Edison's Vitascope was shown at the theatre on August 14, 1896. Many famous actors and actresses from New York and Hollywood performed on the Elitch Theatre stage. Offering New York wages, the theatre booked big stars for generations. Today the theatre is still standing at the original park site.

The park's first roller coaster, a Toboggan Figure 8, opened in 1904. The park's original carousel, built by Philadelphia Toboggan Company, was added in 1906. The carousel remains in operation today as the Kit Carson County Carousel in Burlington, Colorado.

== Mulvihill/Gurtler ownership ==
Flowerbed displaying the "Not to See Elitch's is Not to See Denver" slogan, c. 1916-1920.

In 1916, the park was sold to John Mulvihill, with a provision stating the name could never be changed. New attractions appeared, including the fabulous Trocadero Ballroom in 1917, and two Philadelphia Toboggan Company creations: the Wildcat roller coaster — designed by Herbert Paul Schmeck — in 1922 and a new carousel in 1928. This carousel is still operational at Elitch Gardens. It was during this time the park's enduring slogan was first popularized: "Not to See Elitch's is Not to See Denver."

As floral gardens were expanded and greenhouses built, Elitch's became a commercial florist. Mulvihill died in 1930, and the park's ownership transferred to his son-in-law Arnold Gurtler.

In the mid-1930s, the zoo portion of the park was discontinued, with the space being used for more formal gardens (and rides). A giant floral clock was added and the Trocadero Ballroom became a regular stop for touring big bands and home to An Evening at the Troc, a weekly radio broadcast. During this period of Big Band Jazz and Swing, the Trocadero Ballroom became a summertime night spot as its succession of stars provided hours of live national radio broadcasts in an age before television.

In 1945, management was assumed by Gurtler's sons, Jack and Budd. In 1952, a section of the park called Kiddieland, oriented to small children, was opened. At a time when amusement parks catered almost exclusively to adults, Elitch's Kiddieland was an instant hit attraction. For toddlers, there were two-seat rocket planes, open-wheel race cars, real floating "motorboats", a real small-scale car track with a gas station, all in Kid Scale. The floral business side of the park was quite successful, becoming the largest supplier of carnations in the country in the early 1950s.

Despite substantial community outcry, the Trocadero Ballroom was torn down in 1976, claiming the declining popularity of ballroom dancing, replacing Denver's beloved landmark Old Troc with Skee-Ball and arcade games. The theater, which had switched formats from summer stock to star-centered performances in 1962, closed in 1991.

== Mister Twister ==
Mister Twister opened in 1965. It was a 96-foot-tall (29 m) wooden coaster, designed by John Allen of Philadelphia Toboggan Company, and advertisements promoted the fact that it didn't "have a foot of straight track". It was regularly rated as one of the top ten rides in the country until it stopped operating in 1994 when the park was relocated. Twister III: Storm Chaser at the Elitch Gardens Theme & Water Park is modeled after the original. It was named Twister II until being renamed following a 2023 renovation.

Knoebels, in Elysburg, Pennsylvania, considered relocating the original Mister Twister but, due to space constraints, built a new version very closely patterned after the original, which they simply called Twister.

One feature of Mister Twister was that, after ascending the first hill, the rider was within the line of sight of another coaster, Lakeside Amusement Park's crown jewel 'Cyclone'.

== Wildcat ==
The Wildcat was the oldest of the coasters in the park having been built in 1926 as "The Skyrocket" and revamped as "The Wildcat" in 1935. It was an out-and-back design by Herbert Schmeck of the Philadelphia Toboggan Company, and like Mister Twister, did not make the move to downtown Denver. It has since been demolished to make room for residential development.

== Sidewinder ==
The Sidewinder was Colorado's first looping coaster, and arrived from Magic Springs and Crystal Falls park (where it operated as "the Roaring Tornado") in 1990. It was built by Arrow Dynamics in 1980, and is a launched shuttle loop that speeds into a drop, into a vertical loop, up another hill, and then proceeds to run the course backwards. It made the move to the new park, It is one of three Arrow launched loops made by Arrow to still operate today.

== Ride list ==
- Mister Twister (1964 John C. Allen wooden twister coaster)
- Sidewinder (1981 Arrow Dynamics launched shuttle loop, debuted 1990)
- Wildcat (1927 Herbert Schmeck wooden out-and-back coaster)
- Spitfire (Hrubetz Spitfire, debut unknown but visible in a map dated 1950)
- Splinter (Arrow Development log flume, debuted 1978)
- Rainbow (Huss Rainbow, debuted 1985)
- Troika (Huss Troika (ride), debuted 1977)
- Paradise (Huss Breakdance, debuted 1987)
- Holland Express (Reverchon Himalaya, debuted 1967)
- Casino (Chance Wipeout/Trabant (Ride), debuted 1965)
- Mine Shaft (Chance Rotor, debuted 1991)
- Round Up (Hrubetz Round Up, debuted 1963)
- Thing-A-Ma-Jig (Heintz-Fahtze Twister, debuted 1985)
- Spider (Eyerly Spider, debuted 1969)
- Wild Mouse (Schiff wild mouse, debuted 1960)
- Bumper Cars (Reverchon Dodgems, debuted 1955)
- Illuminator (Chance Skydiver, debuted in 1992)
- Carousel (Philadelphia Toboggan Company 1905 model) first one, Elitch Gardens Carousel, Philadelphia Toboggan Company Carousel #6, was sold and removed in 1928
- Carousel (Philadelphia Toboggan Company 1920 model) second one, Philadelphia Toboggan Company Carousel #51, replaced the original in 1928
- Big Wheel (Chance Giant Wheel, debuted 1992)
- Sea Dragon (Chance Sea Dragon, debuted 1981)
- Sky Ride (Hopkins chairlift, debuted 1969)
- Battle Zone (boat tag, debuted 1987)
- Tilt-A-Whirl (Sellner Tilt-A-Whirl, debuted 1957)
- The Matchless Mine (debuted 1975)
- Cinema 180 (debuted 1981)
- Enterprise (debuted 1981)
- The Old Mill (tunnel boat ride)
- Tours of the World (simulated train ride, debuted 1906)
- Katzenjammer Castle
- Helter-Skelter
- Temple of Mirth
- Miniature Railroad

== Incidents at Elitch Gardens ==
- In 1911, a man was thrown from a car on the Toboggan railway and died from head injuries.
- In 1914, Harry E. Bunkstrom, had an accident while performing an aerial stunt and fell 2,000 feet to his death before a crowd of 1,200 spectators.
- In 1924, a carpenter was killed while working on a water wheel at the Old Mill attraction, after the wheel was accidentally activated by a coworker.
- In 1931, a rider named Jack Finnerty fell from the highest incline of a roller coaster onto the miniature railroad tracks below, suffering multiple injuries.
- In 1944, a fire in the Old Mill boat ride killed six people. The victims included two soldiers with their wives and two people who tried to rescue them.
- In 1946, a rider fell from the back seat of a roller coaster and was dragged more than 70 feet along the rails before falling to the ground. The victim later died from the injuries.
- In 1948, two cars of the miniature train derailed, causing injuries to seventeen riders.
- In 1952, a gun exploded while being fired at the shooting gallery, injuring the shooter.
- In 1959, five riders were injured on a roller coaster when their train collided with a stopped train at the unloading station.
- In 1965, a rider fell from the Wildcat coaster and suffered head injuries.
- In 1965, a 15-year-old girl was killed and eight other people were injured when a car in the miniature train tipped over
- In 1968, lightning struck the Mister Twister ride, causing burn injuries to a rider.
- In 1974, an employee working as a cashier at the front gate was shot three times and died.
- In 1974, five riders were injured when one of the steel arms on the Spider snapped at its base
- In 1976, a man fell to his death from the Mr. Twister ride.
- In 1978, an employee named Dale W. Ripley fell from the loop of a roller coaster and died.
- In 1980, five riders were injured on the Wildcat coaster when a train collided with a tree branch that had fallen on the track and a second train collided with the rear of the stopped train.
- In 1993, twenty-six riders were injured when the operator of Round Up applied the brakes and the ride became stuck in the air.

== Move to new location ==
In 1985, management and ownership of the park was assumed by Buddy Gurtler's son, Sandy Gurtler. At its historic location the park had no expansion space, and the family had long planned to relocate to a larger location. The city of Denver provided a location in the Central Platte River Valley, an area that was once a Superfund cleanup site.

On May 27, 1995, Elitch's opened at its new downtown location with fifteen of its twenty major rides from the old location. The new location sits adjacent to Interstate 25 between Empower Field at Mile High and Ball Arena. It is currently one of the few downtown amusement parks in the United States.

At the old location, separate arson events a day apart in November 1995 destroyed the arcade building and heavily damaged the Splinter water ride and Wildcat roller coaster.

Following two seasons at its new location with attendance of about one million (versus 750,000 for the last season at its old location) and a second season goal of 1.2 million, the park was sold to Premier Parks who subsequently purchased all Six Flags parks. The park operated as 'Six Flags Elitch Gardens' until 2006. CNL Lifestyle Properties purchased Elitch Gardens from Six Flags in 2007 and leased it back to PARC Management. The park was rebranded simply as 'Elitch Gardens'. In 2011, CNL terminated its lease with PARC Management. Then Herschend Family Entertainment was chosen to operate the park, Herschend Family Entertainment operated the park until 2015 when Premier Parks, LLC, the current operator of the park took over.

== Redevelopment ==
The 28-acre (11 ha) site of the former amusement park has undergone redevelopment as Highlands' Garden Village. The site won the Environmental Protection Agency's 2005 Overall Excellence in Smart Growth award for its new urbanism development of 308 housing units and a variety of office and retail spaces. The site maintained many of the old trees and other park elements, including the historic Elitch Theatre, the entertainment gazebo, and the structure that once housed the carousel, which is now a picnic structure. The new development exceeded Colorado's Built Green and Energy Star programs and also used recycled construction materials Walmart Stores Inc. wanted to build one of its Neighborhood Market grocery stores at the site, but neighborhood residents protested the store, saying they didn't want a Wal-Mart in the area. In the fall of 2004, Wal-Mart decided not to build it. Sunflower Farmers Market announced they would anchor the center with a grocery store in July 2005. In January 2009 the Sunflower Market retail building at HGV Green Commons was designated as the first LEED core and shell Gold Supermarket in the United States.
