= Elit =

Elit may refer to:

- Elit İşcan (born 1994), Turkish actress
- Elit (company), Turkish chocolate manufacturer
- Elit, Eritrea
- Elit, Iran
- Elit, Shimron (born 1978), Israeli musician
