= Wolfe Londoner =

American politician (1842–1912)

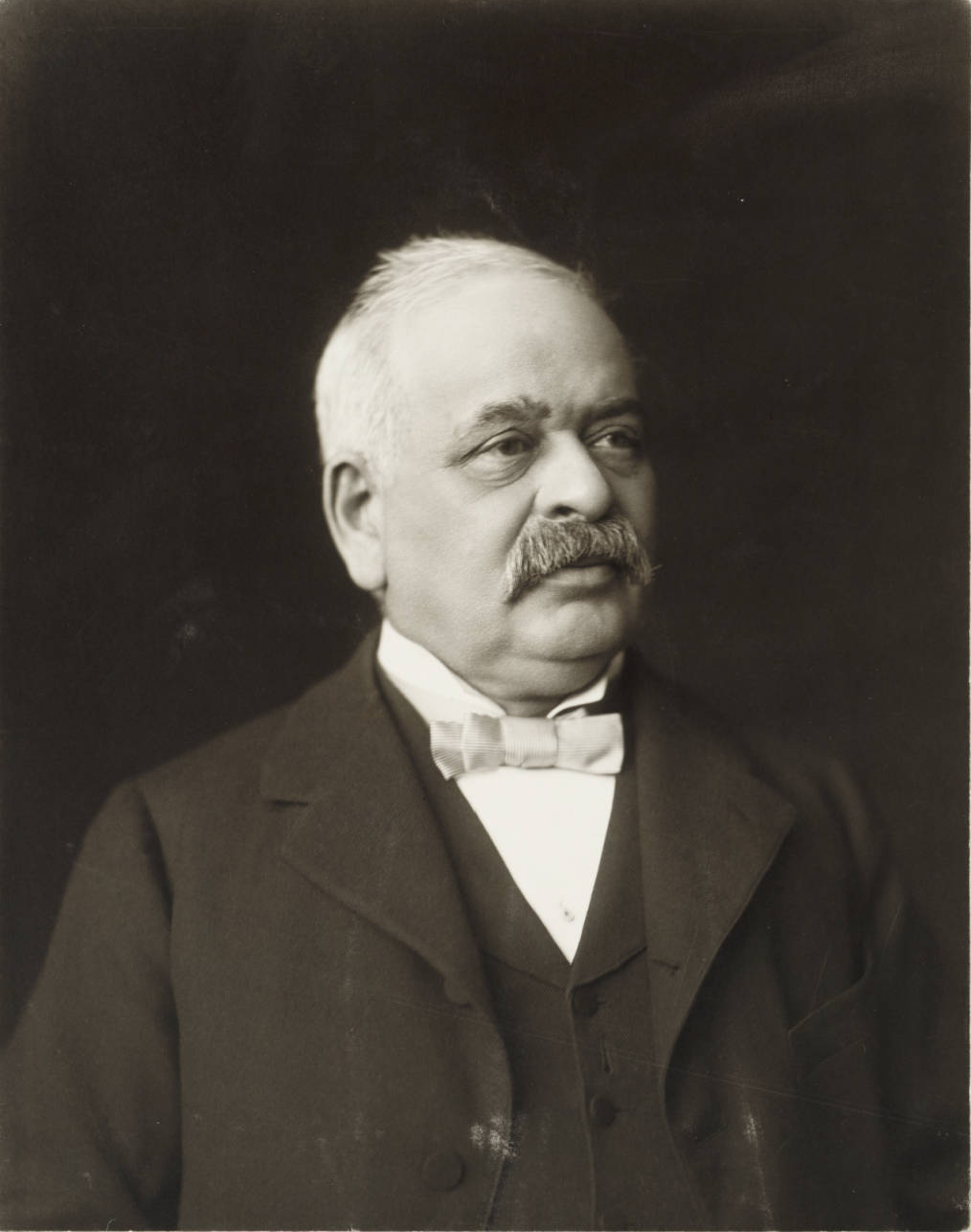
- Londener, circa 1890

20th Mayor of Denver
- In office 1889–1891
- Preceded by: William Scott Lee
- Succeeded by: Platt Rogers

Personal details
- Born: July 4, 1842 New York City, New York, U.S.
- Died: November 23, 1912 (aged 70) Denver, Colorado, U.S.

Wolfe Londoner (July 4, 1842 – November 23, 1912) was an American politician who served as the mayor of Denver, Colorado from 1889 to 1891.

== Biography ==
He was born on 4 July 1842 to parents Herman Londoner and Rachel Hearst in New York City, New York. His family was Jewish. Londoner later converted to the Episcopalian faith but continued donating to Jewish causes. While his father was a wealthy merchant, he found himself to become restless and at the age of 13 years, he left home and travelled by steamship to San Francisco. While here he found employment in a local hotel (where he received $125 a month, including board) and also took on work at an auctioneers helping sell goods every evening (where he received $200 a month). He continued with this work until he had saved enough to open his own grocery business, he remained here for 4 years, until he decided to return to New York, where he went into business with his father.

In 1856 his father moved the business to Dubuque, Iowa and opened a large store, putting Wolfe's older brother in charge. He took charge of another branch store a few miles away. During the Panic of 1857 the whole business folded, his father took the last remaining stock to St. Louis hoping to revive the business there and then send monetary funds back to DuBuque to assist his family in making the journey down the Mississippi River to St. Louis. After waiting a short time Wolfe received $20 from his father, while told to wait for further funds, he ignored this and bartered with a local steamboat captain who eventually acquiesced to allow him and the rest of the family passage for $15 total (promising to repay the rest once he had found work in St. Louis).

Upon arriving in St. Louis he worked sporadically until meeting Mr. A. Hanauer, an old family friend, who provided more secure and better paid employment with Hanauer, Dold & Co. (a general merchants and freighters). In spring 1860, while still in their employment he moved to Denver to take charge of their store, then during the summer he was sent on to Cañon City, Colorado to start another store, which became the 1st stone building in the city. During winter of this same year, he gave up the management of the Denver store, preferring to take on a store in California Gulch as his own, where he stayed until 1865. While located there he held the offices of County Clerk, Recorder of Lake County, County Treasurer and County Commissioner.

In 1865 he moved to Denver and opened a wholesale and grocery store with his brother Julius, aptly named Londoner & Brother, going on to open further stores in Colorado, Kansas, New Mexico and Wyoming, at one point turning over £1 million per annum. In 1887 the Denver business moved premises to the Londoner Block, a large four-story building (located at 1624-1630 Arapahoe Street).

In 1889 he won the nomination for Mayor for the Republican's, however it came with much scandal, as due to concerns he wouldn't win, a number of friends stuffed ballot boxes and traded drinks for votes at local drinking establishments. He became Denver's 20th Mayor by 77 votes, however shortly after getting into office, several disgruntled candidates filed charges against him for corruption, which was taken to court on 6 April 1890. The jury determined that he should step down from office, he appealed this decision with the Colorado Supreme Court but on 7 February 1891 lost his case, with the Court upholding the Lower Courts decision.

He was a founding member of the Denver Press Club, becoming infamous in the town for his 'cyclone cellar', the name given to the basement under his store where reporters would gather to discuss local gossip. He was later elected as President of the Colorado State Press Association in 1900.

Londoner died in 1912 of apoplexy.
