= 1996 Reform Party vice presidential candidate selection =

1996 Reform Party vice presidential nomination
- September 11, 1996
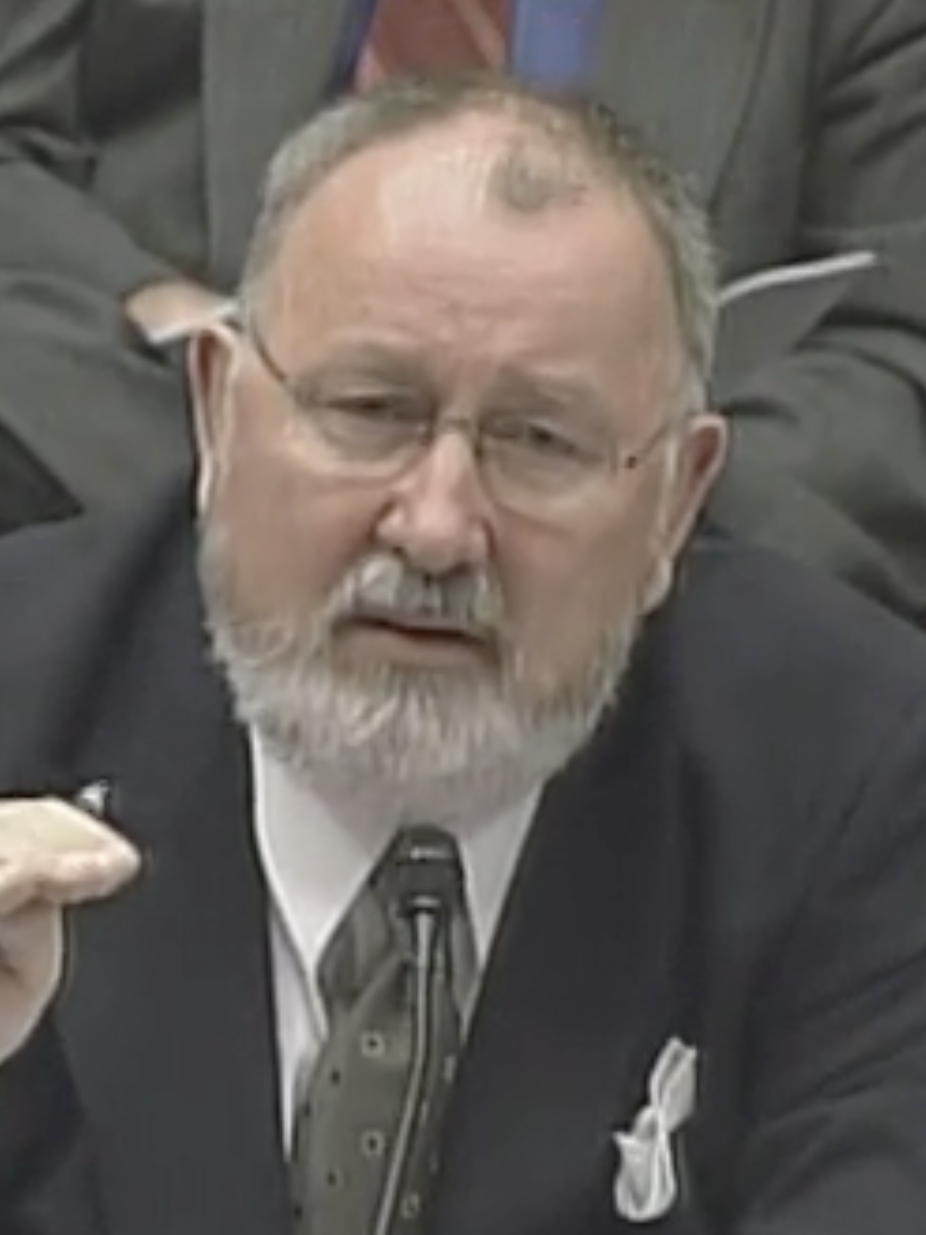
Nominee	Pat Choate
Home state	Oklahoma
Vice Presidential nominee
Pat Choate

This article lists running mates considered by Ross Perot during his 1996 candidacy for President of the United States. Following his 1992 independent candidacy, which attracted nearly 20% of the popular vote, Perot announced the formation of the Reform Party in 1995. Perot ran for president in 1996, and defeated former Colorado Governor Richard Lamm in the Reform Party primaries. On September 11, 1996, Perot announced his choice of economics professor Pat Choate as his running mate. Perot and Choate had previously co-authored the book Save Your Job, Save Our Country, which argued against the ratification of NAFTA. The Perot–Choate ticket took 8.4% of the popular vote in the 1996 election.

== Media speculation of vice presidential candidates ==
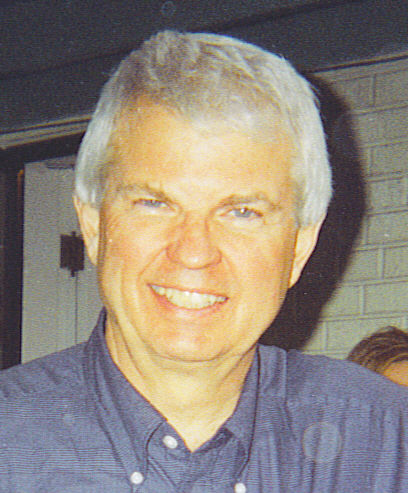
former Governor and 1996 presidential candidate
Richard Lamm
of Colorado
(1975–1987)

State Assemblyman
Dominic L. Cortese
from California
(1992–1996)

== Declined ==
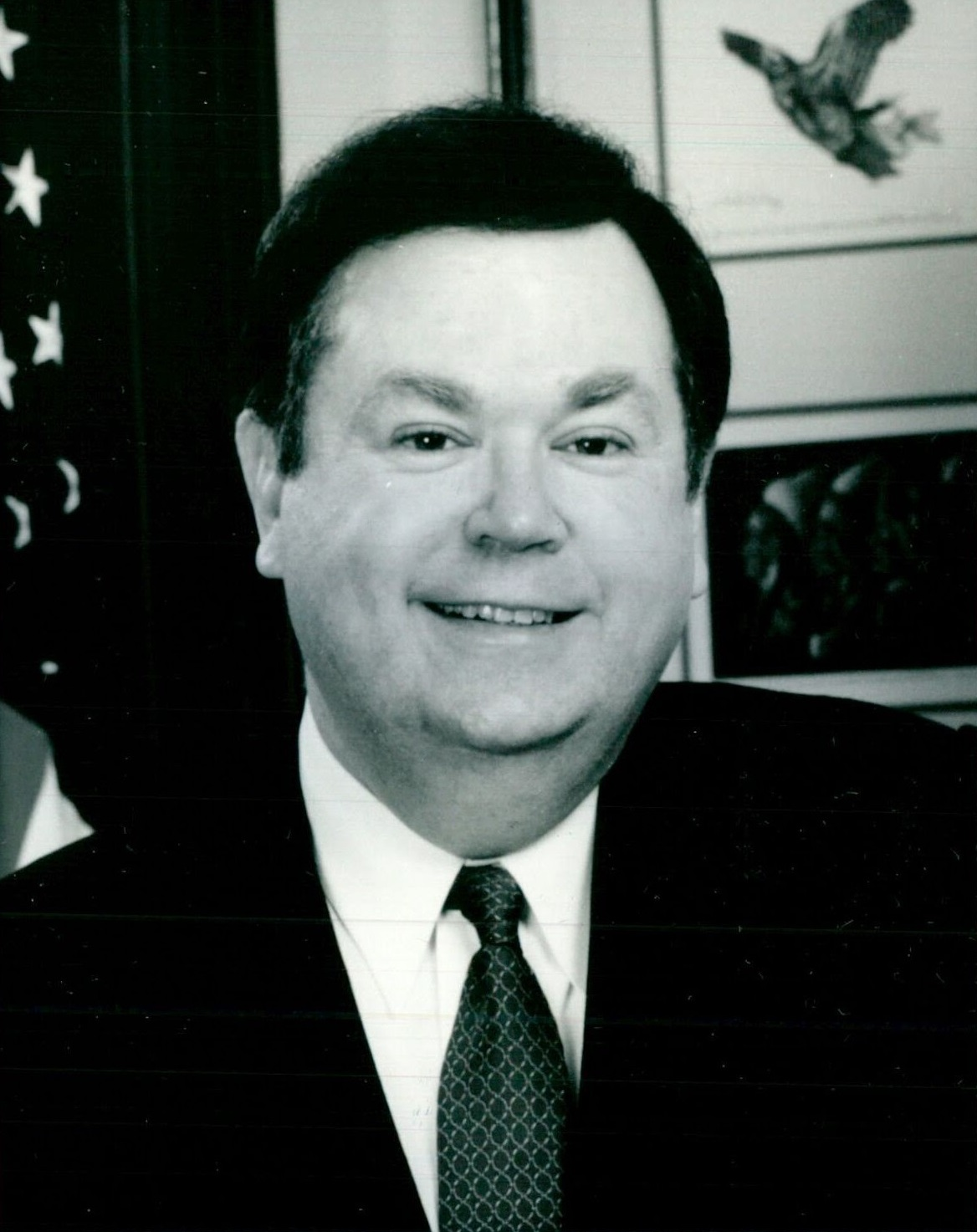
Former Senator
David Boren
from Oklahoma
(1979–1994)

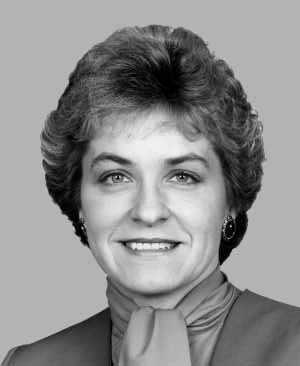
Representative
Marcy Kaptur
from Ohio
(1983–present)

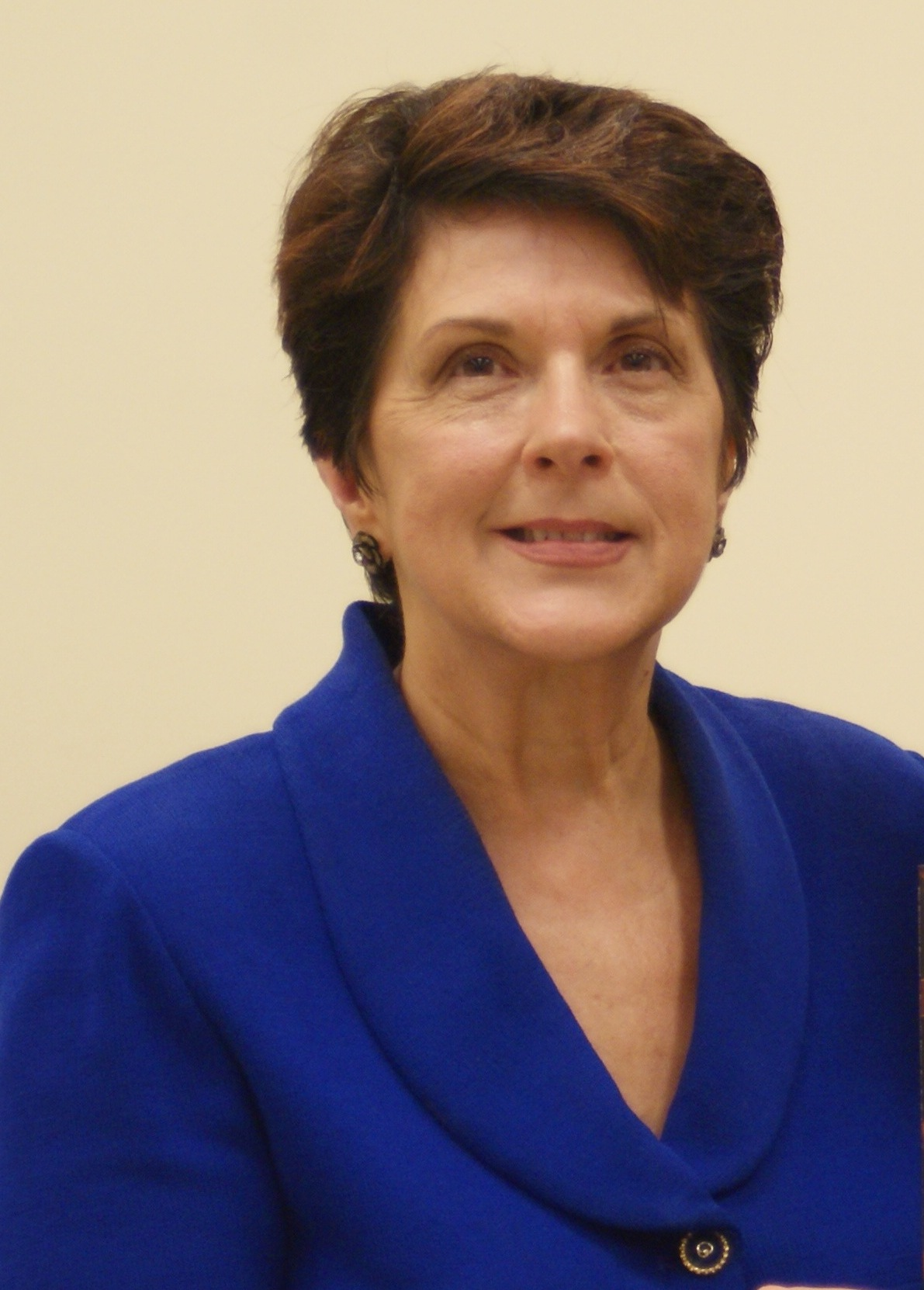
Representative
Linda Smith
from Washington
(1995–1999)

== See also ==
- 1996 United States presidential election
- Ross Perot 1996 presidential campaign
- 1996 Reform Party presidential primaries
- 1996 Reform National Convention
