= Richard Lamm 1996 presidential campaign =

Political campaign for United States President

Lamm For President Inc.
- Campaign: 1996 Reform primaries
- Candidate: Richard Lamm former Governor of Colorado (1975–1987); Ed Zschau former California 12th district Representative (1983–1987)
- Affiliation: Reform Party
- Status: Announced: July 9, 1996; Lost nomination: August 18, 1996
- Headquarters: Boulder, Colorado
- Receipts: US$258,329.00 (1996-12-31)
- Slogan(s): Reform and Renewal

The 1996 presidential campaign of Richard Lamm, former Democratic Governor of Colorado, was launched on July 9, 1996. Lamm announced his intention to seek the Reform Party nomination for the presidency of the United States in the 1996 presidential election in Denver, Colorado.

Despite the entrance of billionaire and founder of the Reform Party Ross Perot the next day Lamm continued his campaign and announced that millionaire and former Representative Ed Zschau would be his vice presidential candidate. In the Reform Party mail-in ballot primaries Lamm took three states and Washington, D.C., and had half the support of Perot. Afterwards he appeared and gave a speech at the convention in Valley Forge, Pennsylvania, and refused to endorse Perot or accept the vice presidential nomination.

== Background ==
In 1974 Lamm was elected to the governorship of Colorado and would become infamous for his dire predictions for social security and healthcare which earned him the nickname "Governor Gloom". In 1992 Lamm was defeated in the Democratic primary for the Senate election and started his drift from the Democratic Party. That same year in the 1992 Perot became the most successful third-party candidate since Theodore Roosevelt in 1912 with 18.91% of the popular vote as an independent and in six states was placed on the ballot on newly formed political parties. In the early nineties multiple independence parties under the leadership of United We Stand America formed with ballot access due to Perot's success in 1992 and in 1995 joined to form the Reform Party. Throughout the development of the new party Perot stated that he would not seek its presidential nomination and left it open to other candidates. Speculation arose that Lamm would run for the nomination after Newsweek ran a story claiming that Perot had contacted Lamm and asked him to seek the nomination. In June Lamm appeared at the California affiliate's convention with Perot where he gave a speech supporting cutting Social Security and Medicare and stated that he would be interested in running for the Reform Party nomination if Perot chose not to. Lamm later said that if he was nominated by the Reform Party he would accept and run as their candidate. A major problem for the Reform Party would be funding and if Perot was not the candidate he would not be allowed to give more than $1,000 to a campaign, however a workaround was speculated with Lamm being the presidential nominee and Perot being the vice presidential nominee which would allow him to play a lesser role in the campaign while still financially backing it up. Another speculated workaround was selecting billionaire Tom Golisano, founder of the Independence Party of New York and its gubernatorial candidate, who was interested in appearing on the Reform Party ticket and stated that "If Dick Lamm needs some help in an effort to be competitive, I probably would help him, sure,".

== Announcement ==
On July 9, 1996, Lamm held a press conference in Denver, Colorado, where he announced his intention to run for the Reform Party's presidential nomination and stated his five rules for the next millennium as stopping injustice for the next generation, ending taxation without representation, stopping reckless borrowing, establishing a self-responsibility ethic, and restoring trust in the government. Lamm's announcement was overshadowed when the next day Perot announced that he had changed his decision and announced that he would also be running for the Reform Party's presidential nomination on Larry King Live. However, despite the funding and name recognition advantage Perot had Lamm chose not to withdraw stating that "These people (party members) are bigger than Perot. Even if he runs, I stand a chance,".

== Campaign developments ==
Shortly after both of their campaign announcements Lamm and Perot met in Augusta, Maine to encourage Reform Party members to meet the deadline for mailing in candidate preference surveys. After Perot's speech half of the audience left before Lamm's speech. Later Lamm attacked the Reform Party leadership for not giving him the mailing list of the 1.3 million party members even though he had been promised it earlier and Perot had access to the same list. Despite the disadvantages Lamm had against Perot he did manage to secure the 10% needed of the preference vote to appear on the official ballot in August.

In early August Lamm announced that former Representative Ed Zschau would be his running mate stating that "This is a person of integrity, honesty and common sense,". However, despite the addition of millionaire Zschau to the ticket Lamm still suffered from campaign fundraising difficulties, lack of time for campaigning, and was unable to get Perot to agree to a debate.

When the official primary ballot results came in Lamm's earlier prediction of him having a one in three chance of winning came true as he took 34.75% of the vote and took the states of Minnesota, Colorado, Alaska and Washington, D.C., and came in a distant last in all but New Mexico, Idaho, and Maryland.
