= 1996 Reform Party presidential primaries =

- August 11–17, 1996
- Turnout: 5%
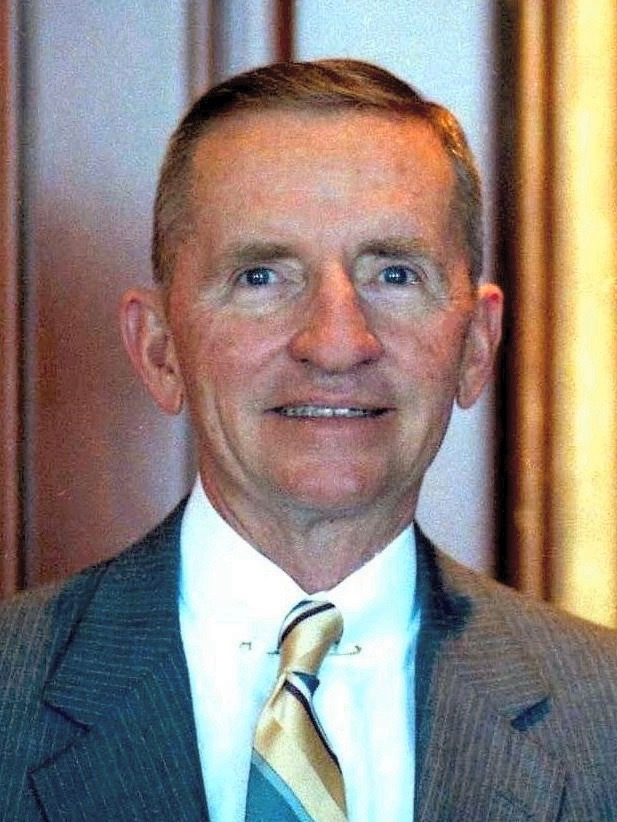

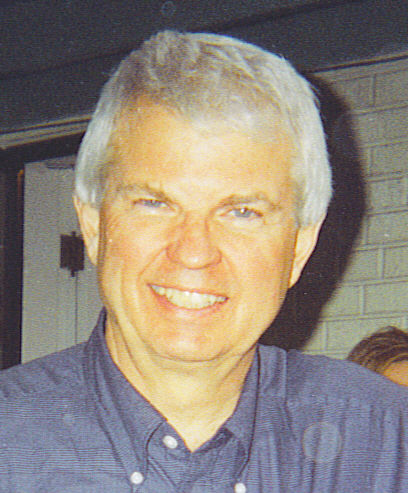
Nominee	Ross Perot	Richard Lamm
Home state	Texas	Colorado
Running mate	Pat Choate	Ed Zschau
States carried	47	3 + D.C.
Popular vote	32,145	17,121
Percentage	65.3%	34.8%
- Mail-In Presidential Primary results map. Perot: 50–60% 60–70% 70–80% 80–90% Lamm: 50–60% 80–90%

A presidential primary was organized by the Reform Party to determine the party's nominee for president of the United States in the 1996 election. Voting took place by mail, telephone, and electronically. Voting began on August 11, 1996, and continued until August 17, when the results were announced.

Businessman and party founder Ross Perot initially announced he would not seek the presidency again after losing the 1992 United States presidential election, but subsequently entered the race on July 11. The former governor of Colorado Dick Lamm was his opponent. Lamm carried Alaska, Colorado, the District of Columbia, and Minnesota, while Perot won the remaining states and defeated Lamm by a nearly two-to-one margin in the national membership vote.

== Candidates ==
Party Founder Ross Perot of Texas (campaign)

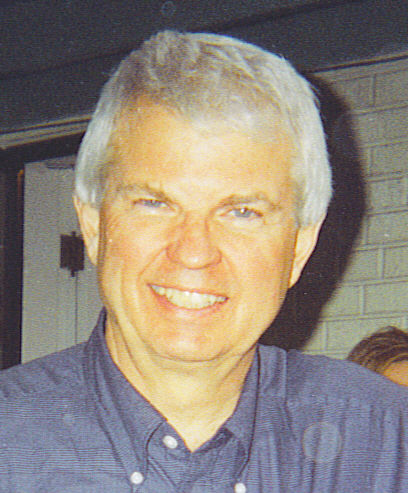
Former Governor Richard Lamm of Colorado
(campaign)

== The mail-in primary ==
In 1995, former presidential candidate Ross Perot's lobbying group United We Stand America decided to become a political party. Thus, the Reform Party of the United States of America was created.

The Reform Party held a two-half 1996 Reform National Convention, on weekends bookending the start and finish of the primary. The results of the vote were announced on August 18, at the second portion of the convention. Party members and those who had signed the party's ballot petitions were granted eligibility to participate in the primary, with approximately 1.4 million people being eligible to participate. The primary was a mail-in primary, with eligible participates able to vote by mail, or by electronic voting over telephone or internet. Additionally, votes could also be cast in-person by those at the location of the first half of the convention. Party coordinator Russ Verney noted that 1,113,000 ballots were mailed out to those who had signed ballot petitions for the party. The accounting firm Ernst & Young was contracted to supervise the tallying of votes.

During the 1996 presidential primaries, the Reform Party was seeking an alternative candidate to party founder Ross Perot, who stated he didn't plan on running for president again. Reform Party activist Mark Sturdevant urged Colorado Governor Richard Lamm to seek the party's nomination. Initially hesitant, Lamm decided that if Ross Perot didn't run then he would enter the presidential race.

Lamm was assured Perot had no intention of running, and he entered the Reform Party's primaries on June 9, with Ed Zschau as his running mate.

Lamm remained a registered member of the Democratic Party, stating: "you can't become a member of the Reform Party in Colorado. There is no Reform Party in Colorado.... I can participate by staying a Democrat. I couldn't become a member of the Reform Party if I wanted to, but I am encouraging people to sign petitions so that they can get on the ballot here in Colorado. We've got to be on the ballot in all 50 states."

On March 19, Perot hinted that he may enter the Reform Party presidential primaries. Later that summer, Perot announced his presidential candidacy. Most Reform Party members supported Perot, and he was the overwhelming victor during the primaries.

Lamm addressed the Reform Party's 1996 National Convention, held in Long Beach, California. In his speech, he criticized President Bill Clinton, saying: "no nation has ever borrowed its way to greatness!" He also blasted Political Action Committees for running dishonest commercials, and stated he hoped the Reform Party would become a "truth telling, straight talking political party... run by ordinary citizens."

His speech received a standing ovation, and he congratulated Ross Perot on his primary victory.

== Results by state ==
States won by H. Ross Perot
States won by Richard Lamm

1996 Reform Party presidential primaries by state
	H. Ross Perot		Richard Lamm		Margin		State Total	
State	#	%	#	%	#	%	#	
Alabama	188	65.96	97	34.04	91	31.92	285	AL
Alaska	40	45.98	47	54.02	−7	−7.96	87	AK
Arizona	541	65.98	279	34.02	262	31.96	820	AZ
Arkansas	124	70.06	53	29.94	71	40.12	177	AR
California	11,174	64.46	6,161	35.54	5,013	28.92	17,335	CA
Colorado	318	18.28	1,422	81.72	−1,104	−63.44	1,740	CO
Connecticut	296	72.37	113	27.63	183	44.74	409	CT
Delaware	108	69.23	48	30.77	60	38.46	156	DE
D.C.	22	40.74	32	59.26	−10	−18.52	54	DC
Florida	2,981	76.24	929	23.76	2,052	52.48	3,910	FL
Georgia	467	60.89	300	39.11	167	21.78	767	GA
Hawaii	75	66.96	37	33.04	38	33.92	112	HI
Idaho	190	53.82	163	46.18	27	7.64	353	ID
Illinois	601	66.41	304	33.59	297	32.82	905	IL
Indiana	773	73.62	277	26.38	496	47.24	1,050	IN
Iowa	96	62.34	58	37.66	38	24.68	154	IA
Kansas	678	64.45	374	35.55	304	28.90	1,052	KS
Kentucky	310	71.43	124	28.57	186	42.86	434	KY
Louisiana	65	82.28	14	17.72	51	64.56	79	LA
Maine	915	66.35	464	33.65	451	32.70	1,379	ME
Maryland	306	54.64	254	45.36	52	9.28	560	MD
Massachusetts	353	59.03	245	40.97	108	18.06	598	MA
Michigan	726	71.04	296	28.96	430	42.08	1,022	MI
Minnesota	281	41.51	396	58.49	−115	−16.98	677	MN
Mississippi	63	80.77	15	19.23	48	61.54	78	MS
Missouri	401	72.25	154	27.75	247	44.50	555	MO
Montana	137	60.62	89	39.38	48	21.24	226	MT
Nebraska	111	60.99	71	39.01	40	21.98	182	NE
Nevada	235	72.53	89	27.47	146	45.06	324	NV
New Hampshire	173	65.53	91	34.47	82	31.06	264	NH
New Jersey	455	75.71	146	24.29	309	51.42	601	NJ
New Mexico	123	53.02	109	46.98	14	6.04	232	NM
New York	794	69.10	355	30.90	439	38.20	1,149	NY
North Carolina	458	61.39	288	38.61	170	22.78	746	NC
North Dakota	136	63.85	77	36.15	59	27.70	213	ND
Ohio	1,059	74.32	366	25.68	693	48.64	1,425	OH
Oklahoma	1,237	70.36	521	29.64	521	40.72	1,758	OK
Oregon	269	65.61	141	34.39	128	31.22	410	OR
Pennsylvania	752	70.94	308	29.06	444	41.88	1,060	PA
Rhode Island	47	69.12	21	30.88	26	38.24	68	RI
South Carolina	552	67.15	270	32.85	282	34.30	822	SC
South Dakota	69	68.32	32	31.68	37	36.64	101	SD
Tennessee	187	76.02	59	23.98	128	52.04	246	TN
Texas	1,877	72.70	705	27.30	1,172	45.40	2,582	TX
Utah	88	59.86	59	40.14	29	19.72	147	UT
Vermont	31	65.96	16	34.04	15	31.92	47	VT
Virginia	239	66.76	119	33.24	120	33.52	358	VA
Washington	272	68.86	123	31.14	149	37.72	395	WA
West Virginia	78	72.22	30	27.78	48	44.44	108	WV
Wisconsin	417	71.16	169	28.84	248	42.32	586	WI
Wyoming	254	55.46	204	44.54	50	10.92	458	WY
TOTALS:	32,145	65.25	17,121	34.75	15,024	30.50	49,266	US
