= 1996 Reform National Convention =

- 1996 presidential election

- Presidential nominee (Perot)

Convention
- Dates: August 10–13, 1996 (first portion); August 18, 1996 (second portion)
- City: Long Beach, California (first portion); King of Prussia, Pennsylvania (second portion)
- Venue: Terrace Theater and Long Beach Convention Center (first portion); Valley Forge Convention Center (second portion)

Candidates
- Presidential nominee: Ross Perot of Texas

1996 Reform National Convention was held August 10–13 in Long Beach, California, and August 18 in King of Prussia, Pennsylvania (the latter being referred to as "Valley Forge" for the convention). Based upon the results of a primary (conducted by mail-in and electronic voting), Ross Perot was selected by the Reform Party of the United States of America as its nominee for president in the 1996 United States presidential election.

== Background ==
In the 1992 presidential election, Ross Perot had run a campaign for president as an independent candidate and received 18.9% of the vote in that election. Beginning in 1995, he took steps which evolved his political organization United We Stand into a political party, initially to be named the "Independence Party" but ultimately founded as the Reform Party of the United States of America. On November 10, 1995, Perot announced tentative plans for the party to select its presidential candidate at a presidential convention.

== Logistics ==
The party's 1996 convention consisted of two phases: a first portion held in Long Beach, California and a nomination meeting held at the Valley Forge Convention Center in King of Prussia, Pennsylvania. The party's nominee was announced at the latter meeting. The first meeting was held prior to the 1996 Republican National Convention, while the second portion was held after the Republican convention had concluded. The 1996 Democratic National Convention was held later than either portion of the Reform convention.

Katie Fairbank of The Associated Press described the decision to hold the convention in two phases in cities on opposite coasts of the United States as Perot "constructing a very unconventional convention".

Because there was not yet legally an established national committee for the Reform Party, both the primary and the convention were organized by Perot's campaign committee with expenses the self-funded by Perot.

=== Long Beach logistics ===
Official logo for the Long Beach portion of the convention

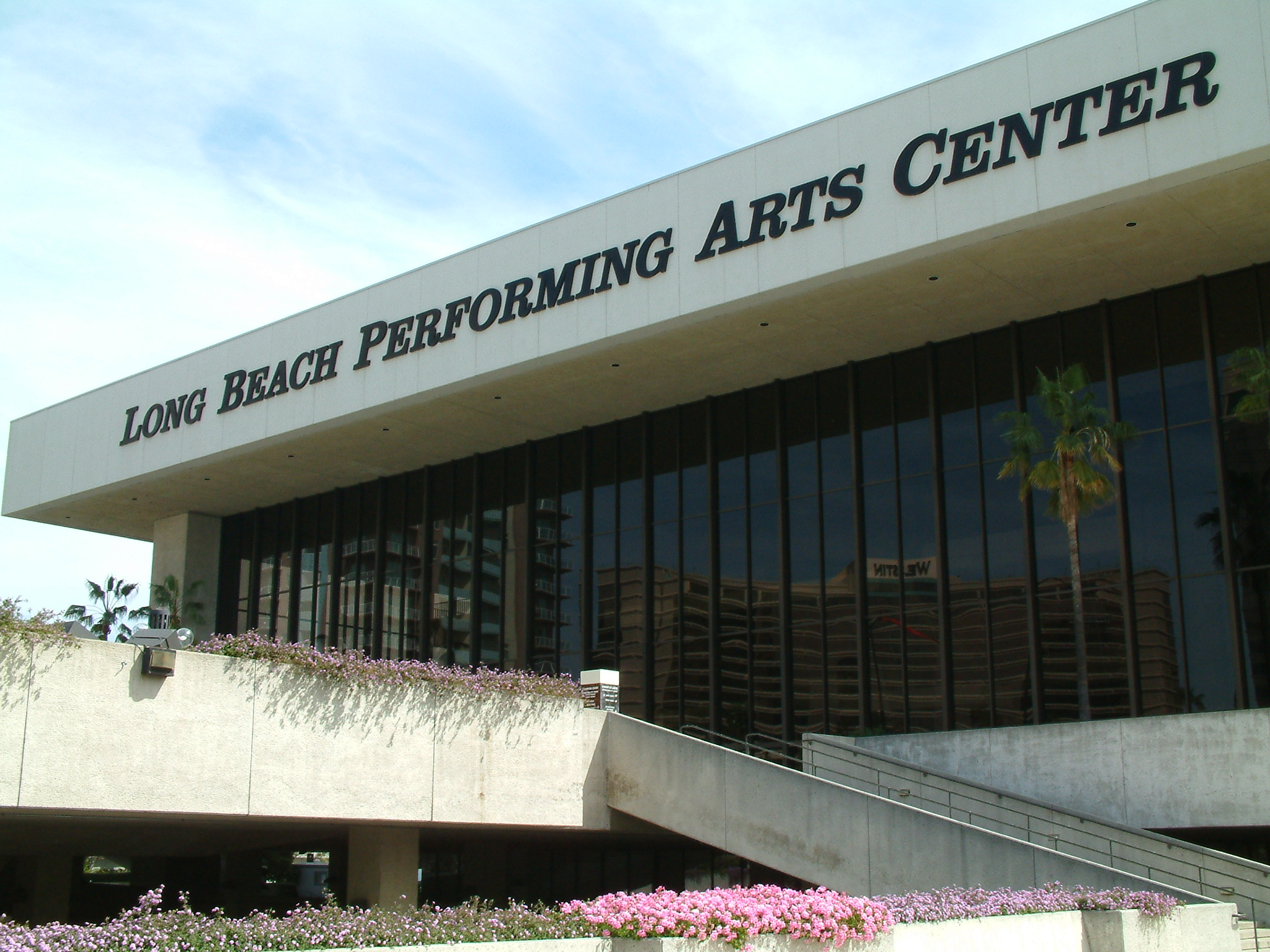
Exterior view of the Terrace Theater (convention venue), photographed in 2007

The first portion of the convention was held August 10–13 in the Terrace Theater and other portions of the Long Beach Convention Center in Long Beach, California. It was attended by approximately 1,500 to 2,000 supporters.

The convention featured speeches by both candidates seeking the presidential nomination. It lacked much pomp or circumstance that were standard fittings of the conventions of the conventions of the two major parties. The venue was not adorned with the heaps of bunting that major party conventions were known to adorn their halls with. Fred Bayles of The Associated Press described the Long Beach Convention Center venue as "a spare ballroom devoid of banners and sky boxes".

The proceedings were televised by both CNN and C-SPAN.

The location of Long Beach was selected due to its relatively close proximity to San Diego, California, the location of the 1996 Republican National Convention to be convened the day after the main day of activity for the Long Beach portion of the Reform National Convention. The Long Beach location was approximately 90 miles (140 km) from San Diego. It was hoped that by holding the event at a location near to where mass media were already scheduled to converge for the Republican convention, more media coverage might be granted to the Reform proceedings.

=== "Valley Forge" (King of Prussia) logistics ===
Official logo for the "Valley Forge" portion of the convention

The Valley Forge Convention Center was a 130,000 square feet (12,000 m^{2}) convention facility located in the Philadelphia metropolitan area. The nominating meeting held there was anticipated to include between 3,000 and 5,000 attendees as well as approximately 400 news media workers. To accommodate media needs, Bell Atlantic installed approximately 200 phone lines for use by reporters to use. The facility's management also added wiring needed for television cameras and fax machines. A stage was errected on the main floor of the facility, with 5,000 seats placed before it. Further seating was added to overflow rooms on the venue's lower floor, with video screens broadcasting the speeches.

The event at King of Prussia was described to be a largely made-for-television event, to generate media exposure for its ticket. The location of this half of the convention was frequently referred to as being "Valley Forge". The Reform Party used its location in the so-called "Valley Forge" region of the Philadelphia suburbs to draw positive comparisons between Perot and George Washington, who famously set-up the titular Valley Forge camp during the American Revolutionary War. The party compared Perot's mission to found a new political movement (outside of the two major party's) with George Washington's mission to found a new nation in the Thirteen Colonies.

Local hospitality industry officials anticipated that the portion held in that locale would inject $1.3 million of spending into the local economy. While much smaller than the economic impact of the two major parties' conventions, this expected spending (as well as national media attention) was lauded by local officials. Local officials also believed that hosting the event would improve the stature of the Valley Forge Convention Center as a venue for major events. To accommodate the event, hundreds of hotel rooms were set aside by local hospitality industry officials for use by convention visitors. Further, local hospitality officials set up information booths for convention visitors. This included a booth specializing in connecting convention guests with dining options in the Philadelphia region. They also organized excursions for convention visitors to tour local attractions.

== Presidential nomination ==
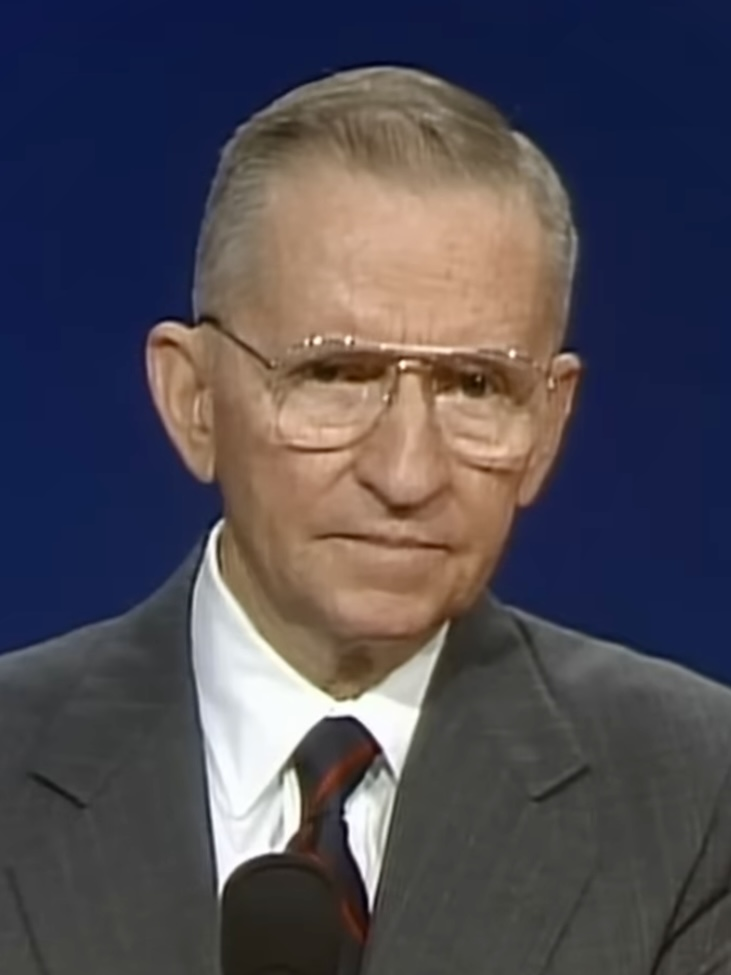
Ross Perot (photographed in 1992) won the presidential nomination

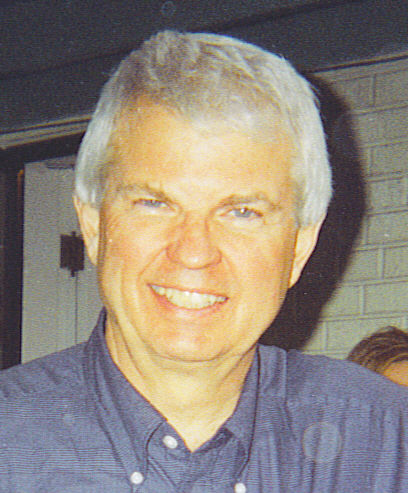
Richard Lamm (photographed in 2007) was Perot's opponent for the nomination

In early August, the party held a mail-in preference primary to select its nominee. Party members were able to vote by mail, telephone, or internet. The results of the vote were announced on August 18, at the nomination meeting in King of Prussia, Pennsylvania. Party members and those who had signed the party's ballot petitions were granted eligibility to participate in the primary, with approximately 1.4 million people being eligible to participate. Votes could also be cast in-person at the Long Beach convention proceedings. Party coordinator Russ Verney noted that 1,113,000 ballots were mailed out to those who had signed ballot petitions for the party.

Seeking the nomination were Perot and Richard Lamm (a former three-term governor of Colorado). Both candidates delivered speeches in Long Beach, making their cases to be the nominee. Lamm outright acknowledged he was the underdog for the nomination, and pledged that he would support Perot if Perot were nominated. While Lamm spoke at the convention after losing the primary, he soon after declared that he would not be endorsing any candidate for president.

== Vice presidential speculation ==
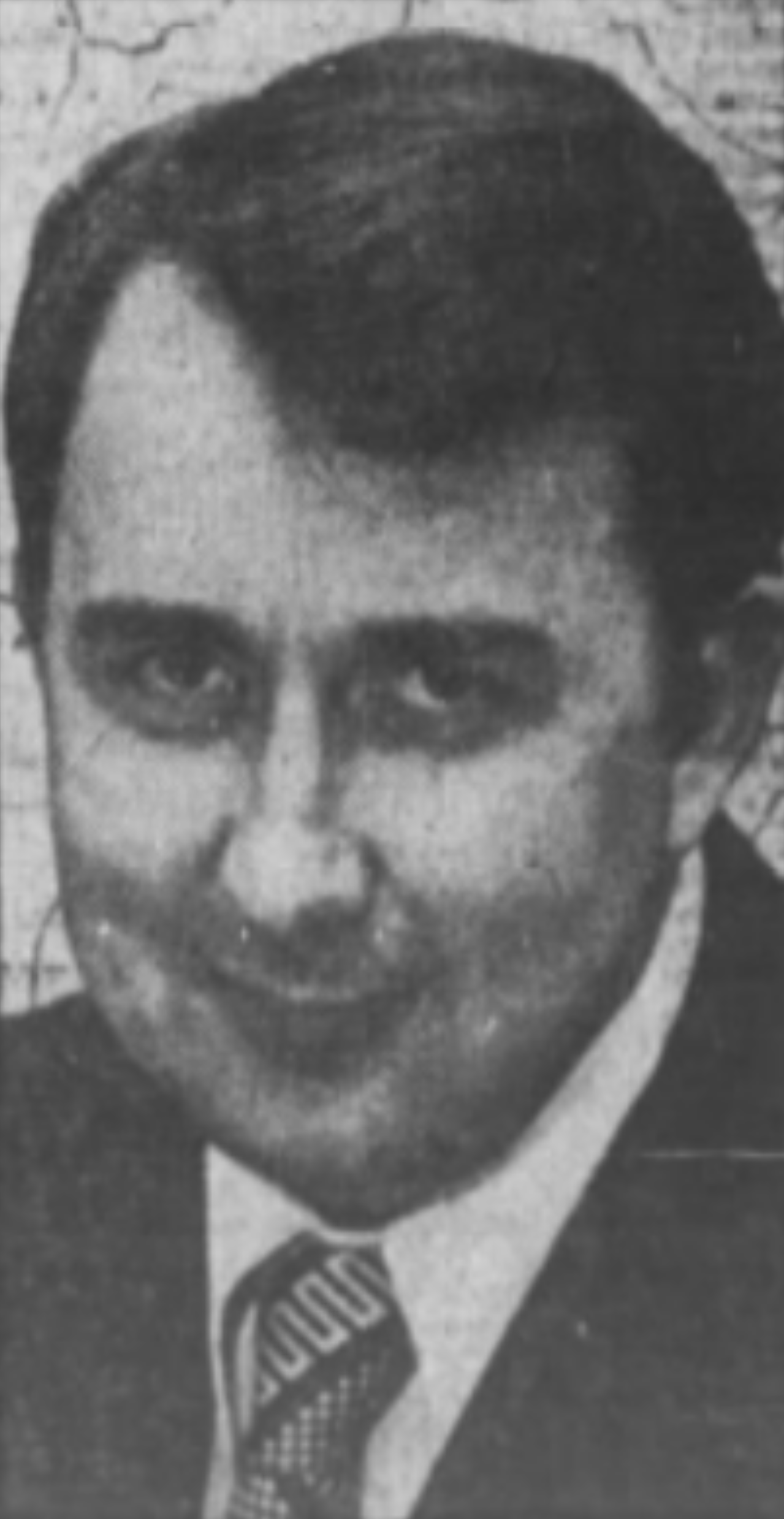
Pat Choate (photographed in 1980) was later nominated after being selected by Perot

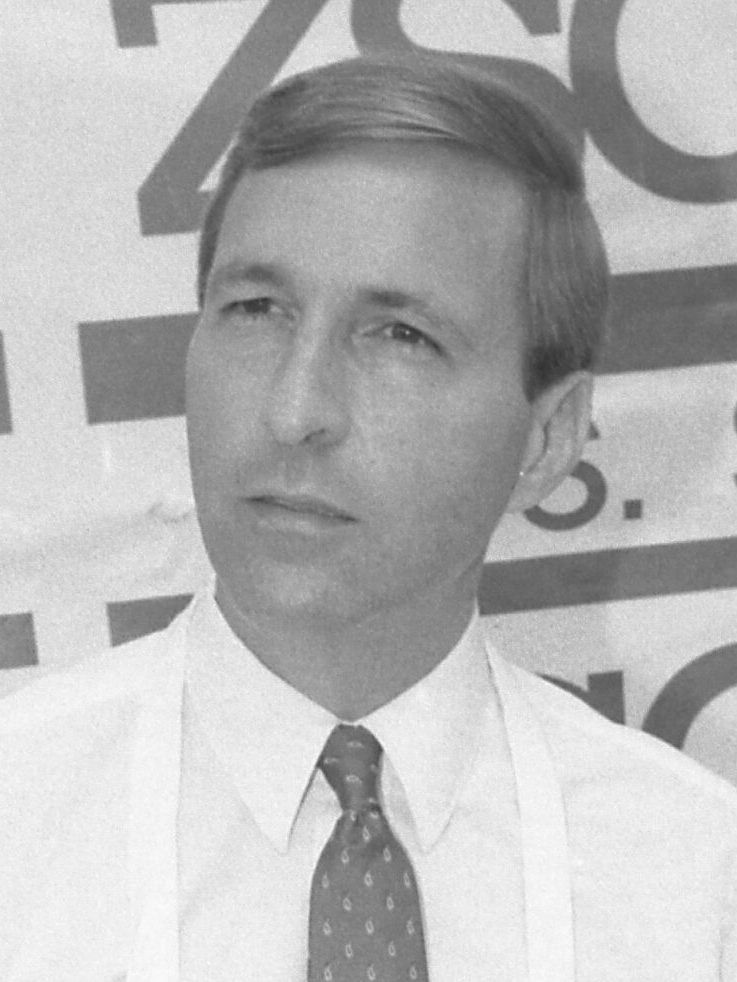
Ed Zschau (photographed in 1986), Lamm's preferred running-mate had he been nominated for president

A vice presidential nominee was not named at the convention.

Lamm had declared during the first portion of the convention that, if nominated, he would select Ed Zschau (a former Republican member of the U.S. House of Representatives) as his vice presidential running mate. Zschsau delivered the main nominating speech for Lamm at the first segment of the convention. In Long Beach, both Zschau and Lamm expressed that they were ruled-out being Perot's running-mate if Perot were nominated.

After winning the presidential nomination, Perot later selected Pat Choate to be his vice presidential running mate.

== Other proceedings ==
At the second half of the convention, delegates from several states together founded a national Reform Party caucus in aims of forming an independent, democratically-elected, and self-governing political party committee for the Reform Party. This began acting as the party's national executive committee.
