= Ross Perot 1996 presidential campaign =

American political campaign

Perot '96
- Campaign: 1996 United States presidential election (Reform primaries)
- Candidate: Ross Perot; President and CEO of Perot Systems (1988–2009); Pat Choate economist
- Affiliation: Reform Party
- Status: Announced: July 10, 1996; Official nominee: August 18, 1996; Lost election: November 5, 1996
- Headquarters: Dallas, Texas
- Key people: Russell Verney (Campaign manager); Sharon Holman (Press secretary); David Bryant (Political consultant); Clay Mulford (General counsel)
- Receipts: US$46,305,750.00 (1996-12-31)
- Slogan: Ross for Boss

Website
- www.perot.org/ (archived - Dec. 11, 1997)

The 1996 presidential campaign of Ross Perot, an independent presidential candidate in 1992 and the founder of the Reform Party, was announced on July 10, 1996. Perot said he would seek the Reform Party nomination for president of the United States in the 1996 election during an appearance on Larry King Live.

After initially stating that he would not seek the nomination of the Reform Party, Perot reversed his decision and announced his campaign the day after former Colorado governor Richard Lamm announced his campaign. Perot easily won the nomination against Lamm in the mail-in primary and selected economist Pat Choate as his vice presidential candidate.

Unlike his previous campaign, which was self-financed, Perot's ability to finance his own campaign was limited to $50,000 after accepting $30 million in presidential public funds; he also suffered from single digit polling numbers after announcing his campaign. Despite Perot's earlier success in the 1992 campaign, he was unable to replicate it in 1996 and did not appear in either of the presidential debates due to new rules established by the Commission on Presidential Debates requiring candidates to poll at least 15% in five national polls.

On Election Day (November 5), 1996, Perot took 8.40% of the popular vote and 0 electoral votes, a decrease of 10.51% from the previous election. However, it remains by far the most successful third party campaign run since Perot's first presidential campaign, with the Reform Party being the first and only third political party in United States history to secure federal matching funds by taking over 5% of the popular vote. The Reform Party received $12.5 million in matching funds in 2000.

== Background ==
In 1992 Perot became the most successful third-party candidate since Theodore Roosevelt in 1912 with 18.91% of the popular vote as an independent and in six states was placed on the ballot on newly formed political parties. In the early nineties multiple independence parties under the leadership of United We Stand America formed with ballot access due to Perot's success in 1992 and in 1995 joined to form the Reform Party.

Following the 1992 campaign Perot continued campaigning against NAFTA and accepted an offer by Vice President Al Gore to debate the issue on Larry King Live on November 9, 1993. "Perot's behavior during the debate was a source of mirth thereafter, including his repeated pleas to 'let me finish' in his southern drawl. The debate was seen by many as effectively ending Perot's political career." Support for NAFTA went from 34% to 57%.

== Announcement ==
Perot had initially stated that he would not seek the Reform nomination, but the Federal Election Commission ruled that only Perot would be eligible for $32 million in federal matching funds as his 1992 candidacy was as an independent so anybody else nominated by the Reform Party would not be eligible for any matching funds and the Reform Party would struggle to raise funds without matching funds as Perot would only be allowed to donate at most $1,000. Another problem for any other Reform candidate would be the loss of ballot access in Texas due to Perot's name being placed onto the ballot as an independent by the Texas affiliate.

On July 9, 1996, former Colorado governor Richard Lamm announced that he would seek the Reform Party's nomination. However, the next day on July 10, Perot announced on Larry King Live that he would seek the presidency again, like he had done in 1992, stating that, "If they feel I am the person they want to do this job, then certainly I will give them everything I have to get it done."

Republican presidential candidate Pat Buchanan stated that Perot "is a mortal threat to the Republican Party" and that the Reform Party, "threatens the viability of the Republican Party." Ironically, Buchanan himself would seek the presidency as the Reform Party nominee just four years later.

== Campaign ==
In July, Perot asked Representative Marcy Kaptur to be his vice presidential running mate, but she declined the following month and chose to stay in Congress.

In mid-August, Perot announced that he would be accepting $30 million in presidential public funds which would limit him to spend no more than $50,000 of his own money on his campaign.

Perot won the nomination on August 17, 1996, and accepted it at the Reform Party convention the following day. Lamm stated that he was "not angry", but that he was unsure if he would vote for Perot. On September 10, Perot selected Pat Choate, an economist with whom he had co-written a 1993 book opposing NAFTA, as his running mate.

Perot was rejected from participating in the presidential debates, unlike in 1992, as the Commission on Presidential Debates determined he did not have a realistic chance to win. He received 8.4% of the popular vote, and did not win any states.

== Finance ==
Candidate	Campaign committee							
Candidate	Raised	Total contrib.	Ind. contrib.	Pres. pub. funds	Spent	COH	Owed By	Owed To
Ross Perot	$46,305,750.00	$14,862,392.00	$1,097,938.00	$29,055,400.00	$46,622,549.00	$0.00	$80,239.00	$0.00

State/Territory	Campaign Fundraising and Spending By State/Territory			
State/Territory	Ind. contrib.	Ind. contrib. <$200	% <$200	Spent
Alabama	$1,800.00	$0.00	0.00%	$0.00
Alaska	$952.00	$200.00	21.01%	$300.00
Arizona	$1,100.00	$200.00	18.18%	$400.00
Arkansas	$0.00	$0.00	N/A	$80.00
California	$29,030.00	$2,000.00	6.89%	$8,104.00
Colorado	$1,970.00	$0.00	0.00%	$330.00
