= Charles Faddis =

Charles Faddis may refer to:

- Charles I. Faddis (1890–1972), member of the United States House of Representatives from Pennsylvania
- Charles Sam Faddis (1958–2026), American CIA operations officer, author, political operative and conspiracy theorist
