= United We Stand America =

American political organization

United We Stand America was the name selected by Texas businessman H. Ross Perot for his citizen action organization after his 1992 independent political campaign for President of the United States. Perot's 19% showing in the 1992 election was sufficient to entitle him to federal matching funds for the 1996 campaign. After the campaign, Perot announced, on January 11, 1993, the formation of a non-profit watchdog organization named United We Stand America (UWSA).

== History ==
In the early 1990s, many people were talking about forming a new political party. These discussions centered around populist themes. The eventual result of the movement that followed was United We Stand America, followed by the Reform Party, and in some states the Independence Party. The early history of UWSA revolved around establishment of chapters in all 50 states and citizen activism against the North American Free Trade Agreement (NAFTA). The organization also supported Ross Perot's fiscally conservative and socially liberal platform.

In November 1993, Perot and Vice-president Al Gore conducted a nationally televised debate about NAFTA on Larry King Live, which had been the highest rated CNN program until the Republican presidential debate in September 2015.

UWSA remained active under Perot's leadership until late 1995 when the paid staff was moved to a new organization dubbed "Citizens for the Reform Party" which actively campaigned to petition the Reform Party on to the ballot in all 50 states for the 1996 presidential election. The name of Perot's organization conflicted with that of a United Way-type LGBT advocacy group that had already copyrighted the name 'United We Stand'.

== The Independent Movement and Founding of the Reform Party ==
The movement to the political center ignited and began taking shape in one form or another all around the country in 1992. In Minnesota, the Independence Party was formed in 1992 by supporters of Ross Perot, and fielded Dean Barkley that year as a candidate for a seat in the US House of Representatives. Other supporters led by Don Dow, State Director, and Victoria Staten, Assistant State Director and Ross Perot's spokesperson on NAFTA, worked as part of United We Stand America, and some eventually found their way to the Independence Party after the elections. In later years, the party began to field candidates in races of other states. In 1995 the Independence Party of Minnesota became affiliated with the national Reform Party and renamed itself the Reform Party of Minnesota. This is the same group that led the effort to elect Jesse Ventura, one of three independent governors in recent years. In 1995 Angus King was elected Governor of Maine. King's election as an independent was not unprecedented in Maine politics; independent James B. Longley had been elected twenty years earlier. Though a member of the Republican Party during his time in Congress, Lowell Weicker left the Republican Party, and in 1991 he became one of the few independents to be elected as a state governor.

The Reform Party, founded in 1995 with ballot access in all 50 states, nominated Ross Perot for President after a convention battle between Perot and Richard Lamm, former governor of Colorado. Perot's running mate in 1996 was Pat Choate, a well-known author, economist and professor. The future of the Reform Party was somewhat clouded by the 1996 election results when the Perot/Choate ticket received only 9% of the overall vote. Since many states require a minimum of 10% to retain ballot access, the ability of the party to field candidates without the time and expense of petition drives was limited. However, based on the 1996 results, the party retained the ability to earn federal matching funds in the 2000 Presidential election - a fact that was not lost on Pat Buchanan. The battle for control of the Reform Party between many of the founding members and Buchanan's weakened the Reform Party to the extent that it has diminished as a factor in U.S. politics in the years since the 2000 election.

United We Stand America no longer exists today. Archives of material from the original organization can be found at http://www.uwsa.com/books/Uwsabook.html, but the original group founded by Ross Perot ceased to be active after the independents organized, and with the formation of the Reform Party in 1995.
