= Charles Sam Faddis =

American Central Intelligence Agency (CIA) officer (1958–2026)

Charles Faddis

Charles Samuel Faddis (May 23, 1958 – July 25, 2026), also known as Sam Faddis, was an American Central Intelligence Agency (CIA) operations officer, author, political operative and conspiracy theorist.

== Early life and education ==
Faddis was born in Bethesda, Maryland on May 23, 1958. His father was James Morris Faddis and his mother was Violet Knighton Tucker Faddis. His grandfather is former Rep. Charles Isaiah Faddis of Pennsylvania. He graduated with a bachelor's degree in political science from Johns Hopkins University and a law degree from the University of Maryland School of Law.

== Service in the Military ==
Faddis was a Captain (retired) and served US Army Armor Branch and as Judge Advocate General's Corps (JAG) officer.

== Service in the CIA ==
Faddis claimed to have led the first CIA team into Iraq nine months in advance of the 2003 invasion of Iraq. He then served as head of the CIA's Counter Terrorism Center (CTC)'s Weapons of Mass Destruction unit.

== Authorship and media analysis ==
Faddis authored numerous books on intelligence and the 2003 Iraq War. He was the author of Beyond Repair: The Decline And Fall Of The CIA (OCLC 320187450) and Willful Neglect: The Dangerous Illusion Of Homeland Security (OCLC 435418929). He co-wrote Operation Hotel California: The Clandestine War Inside Iraq. The latter work was criticized in Studies in Intelligence for relying too heavily on a single interview and for an "odd" bibliography.

A regular commentator on conservative media, Sam Faddis often shared support for conspiracy theories. Faddis first appeared on Fox News about the 2012 Benghazi Attack and China. Faddis was a regular on Steve Bannon's War Room.

== Conspiracy theorist ==
After Faddis retired from the CIA, he published And Magazine, a news and conspiracy newsletter. He was a political operative and US Senate candidate in Maryland. Faddis organized a coalition of self-described Patriot groups in Pennsylvania.

== Death ==
Faddis died in Philadelphia on July 25, 2026, at the age of 68.
