= Reform Party of the United States of America =

American political party

- Chairperson: Nicholas Hensley
- Founder: Ross Perot
- Founded: 1995; 31 years ago
- Registered: 62,304 (2015)
- Legalized: September 3, 1995
- Headquarters: Dallas, Texas
- Registered voters (2026): ▲18,328
- Ideology: Populism; Radical centrism; Fiscal conservatism; Liberalism; Anti-neoliberalism
- Political position: Centre
- Colors: Purple
- Elected offices: 98 / 519,682

Website
- reformparty.org

Former party logo (1995–2025)

The Reform Party of the United States of America (RPUSA), generally known as the Reform Party USA or the Reform Party, is a centrist political party in the United States. The party was founded in 1995 by Ross Perot and qualifies as a third party.

Perot believed Americans were disillusioned with the state of politics as being corrupt and unable to deal with vital issues. After he received 18.9 percent of the popular vote as an independent candidate in the 1992 presidential election, he founded the Reform Party and presented it as a viable alternative to Republicans and Democrats. As the Reform Party presidential nominee, Perot won 8.4 percent of the popular vote in the 1996 presidential election. While he did not receive a single electoral vote, no other third-party or independent candidate has since managed to receive as high a share of the popular vote.

The party has nominated other presidential candidates over the years, including Pat Buchanan and Ralph Nader. Its most significant victory came when Jesse Ventura was elected governor of Minnesota in 1998, although he left the party shortly into his term. Donald Trump was a member of the Reform Party during his brief 2000 presidential campaign. In around the year 2000, party infighting and scandals led to a major decline in the party's strength. Beginning with Buchanan's poor showing in the 2000 election, no Reform Party presidential nominee since 1996 has been able to gather 1 percent of the popular vote.

Nicholas Hensley is the current chair of the party.

== The Ross Perot movement ==
=== Ross Perot's 1992 presidential election campaign ===
The party grew out of Ross Perot's efforts in the 1992 presidential election, where—running as an independent—he became the first non-major party candidate since 1912 to have been considered viable enough to win the presidency. Perot received attention for focusing on fiscal issues such as the federal deficit and national debt; government reform issues such as term limits, campaign finance reform, and lobbying reform; and issues on trade. A large part of his following was grounded in the belief he was addressing vital problems largely ignored by the two major parties.

A Gallup poll showed Perot with a slim lead; however, on July 19, he suspended his campaign, accusing Republican operatives of threatening to sabotage his daughter's wedding. He was accused by Newsweek of being a "quitter" in a well-publicized cover-page article. After resuming his campaign on October 1, Perot was dogged by the "quitter" moniker and other allegations concerning his character. On Election Day, many voters were confused as to whether Perot was actually still a candidate. He ended up receiving about 18.9 percent of the popular vote, a record level of popularity not seen in an independent candidate since former President Theodore Roosevelt ran on the "Bull Moose" Progressive Party ticket in 1912. He continued being politically involved after the election, turning his campaign organization (United We Stand America) into a lobbying group. One of his primary goals was the defeat of the North American Free Trade Agreement during this period.

== Foundation and rise of the party ==
In 1995, Republicans took control of the House of Representatives, largely on the strength of the "Contract with America", which recognized and promised to deal with many of the issues Perot's voters had mobilized to support in 1992. However, two of the major provisions (Constitutional amendments for term limits and the balanced budgets) failed to secure the two-thirds congressional majorities required to be submitted to the states.

Dissatisfied, the grassroots organizations that had made Perot's 1992 candidacy possible began to band together to found a third party intended to rival the Republicans and Democrats. For legal reasons, the party ended up being called the "Reform Party" ("Independent Party" was preferred, but already taken, as were several variants on the name). A drive to get the party on the ballot in all fifty states succeeded, although it ended with lawsuits in some regions over state ballot access requirements. In a few areas, minor parties became incorporated as state party organizations.

== Apex: 1996 presidential election ==
=== Nomination campaign ===
At first, when the 1996 election season arrived, Perot held off from entering the contest for the Reform Party's presidential nomination, calling for others to try for the ticket. The only person who announced such an intention was Dick Lamm, former Governor of Colorado. After the Federal Election Commission indicated only Perot and not Lamm would be able to secure federal matching funds—because his 1992 campaign was as an independent—Perot entered the race. Some were upset that Perot changed his mind because, in their view, Perot overshadowed Lamm's run for the party nomination. This built up to the beginning of a splinter within the movement, when it was alleged certain problems in the primary process—such as many Lamm supporters not receiving ballots, and some primary voters receiving multiple ballots—were Perot's doing. The Reform Party claimed these problems stemmed from the petition process for getting the Reform Party on the ballot in all of the states since the party claimed they used the names and addresses of petition signers as the basis of who received ballots. Primary ballots were sent by mail to designated voters. Eventually, Perot was nominated for president and he chose economist Pat Choate as his vice presidential running mate. The results of the party's presidential primary were: Perot 32,145, Lamm 17,121.

=== Exclusion from the debates ===
Between 1992 and 1996, the Commission on Presidential Debates changed its rules regarding how candidates could qualify to participate in the presidential debates. As Perot had previously done very well in debates, it was a decisive blow to the campaign when the Commission ruled that he could not participate on the basis of somewhat vague criteria — such as that a candidate was required to have already been endorsed by "a substantial number of major news organizations," with "substantial" being a number to be decided by the commission on a case-by-case basis. Perot could not have qualified for the debates in 1992 under these rules, and was able to show that various famous U.S. presidents would likewise have been excluded from the modern debate by the Commission on Presidential Debates.

Despite legal action by the Perot team, and an 80 percent majority of Americans supporting his participation in the debates, the Commission refused to budge and Perot was reduced to making his points heard via a series of half-hour "commercials". In the end, Perot and Choate won 8 percent of the vote.

== Plateau and decline ==
=== 1997 ===
By October 1997, factional disputes began to emerge with the departure of a group that believed Perot had rigged the 1996 party primary to defeat Lamm. These individuals eventually established the "American Reform Party" (ARP). Then chairman, Roy Downing, said the split came about when it was "...discovered [that the Reform Party] was a top-down party instead of a bottom-up organization." Although members of the group attempted to persuade former Colorado Governor Dick Lamm – Perot's chief rival for the nomination – to run for president as an Independent, he declined, pointing out that he had promised before running that he would not challenge the party's decision. During this time, Perot himself chose to concentrate on lobbying efforts through United We Stand America.

==== American Reform Party ====
When the ARP was founded, Jackie Salit noted in the Christian Science Monitor: "At its founding meeting in Kansas City in 1997, the 40 black delegates in the room, led by the country's foremost African-American independent – Lenora Fulani – represented the first time in US history that African-Americans were present at the founding of a major national political party."

The ARP has yet to organize in more than a few states. In the 2000, 2004, and 2008 elections, the American Reform Party supported Ralph Nader for president. The ARP is not a political party in the conventional sense. It does not have ballot access in any state, and it does not run candidates. It supports third-party candidates and independents who support the primary principles of the Party's platform.

About 2010–2011, the party shifted from a relatively centrist platform to a Tea Party-style fiscal conservative one. In the 2012 presidential election, the ARP endorsed Republican Party nominee Mitt Romney against incumbent president Barack Obama. In the 2016 presidential election, the Party endorsed the Republican candidate Donald Trump.

===== Affiliates =====
- In New York State, the Integrity Party is an ARP affiliate. The group, led by Darren Johnson, used the state's fusion election system in cross-endorsing a Democratic sheriff candidate, Vincent Demarco, in Suffolk County, helping him narrowly win the election. The party had also run a host of other candidates and attempted to go statewide in 2006, fielding Phoebe Legere as a candidate in the 2006 New York gubernatorial election. Legere and the party did not qualify for the November ballot.
- The Reform Party of Northern Mariana Islands was an affiliate of the ARP. The group was founded by former governor Froilan Tenorio, who was dissatisfied with the Democratic Party. The territory-level party was notable for electing a member to the Northern Mariana Islands Senate in the 1999 general elections, their first and only elected official. The party would lose their only elected official in the 2003 general elections and would cease political activities afterwards.

=== Mid-term elections of 1998 ===
In 1998, the Reform Party received a boost when Jesse Ventura was elected Governor of Minnesota. According to the League of Women Voters, the Reform Party USA obtained more votes nationwide in 1998 than did any other third party in America (without those garnered by Ventura). Counting Ventura's performance, Reformers took in more votes than all other third parties in the United States combined, establishing the Reform Party as America's third-largest party.

=== 2000 presidential election ===
The Reform Party's presidential nominee for the 2000 election was due federal matching funds of $12.5 million (~$23.7 million in 2025), based on Perot's 8 percent showing in 1996. Early on, there was a failed effort to draft Ron Paul.

Donald Trump entered the race briefly, giving television interviews outlining his platform. Trump was relatively progressive on social issues, and supported allowing openly gay soldiers in the military, saying: "it would not disturb me". Trump considered himself a conservative, but criticized Pat Buchanan, saying: "I'm on the conservative side, but Buchanan is Attila the Hun." He withdrew from the race citing the party's infighting, as did Jesse Ventura and the Minnesota Reform Party. Donald Trump stated: "So the Reform Party now includes a Klansman, Mr. Duke, a neo-Nazi, Mr. Buchanan, and a communist, Ms. Fulani. This is not company I wish to keep."

Buchanan decided to leave the Republican Party because, "The Republican Party at the national level has ceased to be my party. This divorce began around the end of the Cold War when President [George] Bush declared it to be a New World-order party and began intervening all over the world. While he and I were allies and friends during the Cold War, I just felt that once the Cold War was over the United States should return to a more traditional non-intervention foreign policy."

After a bitter fight, Buchanan secured the Reform Party's presidential nomination over John Hagelin of the Natural Law Party. Hagelin and an anti-Buchanan faction walked out and held a separate convention across the street, where they nominated Hagelin as the party's presidential candidate. The dispute went to the courts and the FEC decided that Buchanan was the legitimate nominee and awarded him $12.6 million in campaign funds. Buchanan's vice presidential running mate was Ezola B. Foster. Buchanan received 449,225 votes, just 0.4 percent of the popular vote, and the party lost its matching funds for 2004.

In 2002, Buchanan returned to the Republican Party. Following this, a number of white nationalists and far-right extremists remained with the Reform Party.

=== 2004 presidential election ===
By the October 2003, National Convention, the Reform Party had only begun rebuilding, but several former state organizations had elected to rejoin now that the interference from the Freedom Parties was gone. They increased their ranks from 24 to 30 states and managed to retrieve ballot access for seven of them. (Buchanan's poor showing in 2000 had lost ballot access for almost the entire party.)

Because of organizational and financial problems in the party, it opted to support the independent campaign of Ralph Nader as the best option for an independent of any stripe that year. While the endorsement generated publicity for Nader and the Reform Party, the party was only able to provide Nader with seven ballot lines down from the 49 of 51 guaranteed ballot lines the party had going into the 2000 election.

== Collapse ==
=== Activities of the party in 2005 ===
In 2005, a dispute arose for the number of National Committee members required under the party's by-laws to call meetings of the National Committee. These members came from several states including Texas, Michigan, and Florida. At both meetings, it was determined that a national convention would be called and held in Tampa, Florida. The chairman at the time and National Committee members from Arizona, California, and Oklahoma boycotted the National and executive committee meetings, claiming the meetings were illegitimate. As a result, those states held a second convention in Yuma, Arizona.

In response to a suit filed by the group that met in Tampa, leaders of the Reform Party filed a Racketeer Influenced and Corrupt Organizations Act (RICO) complaint claiming the Tampa group were extremists and guilty of conspiracy.

=== 2006 candidates ===
In 2006, the Reform Party nominated candidates in Arizona, and petitioned to regain ballot access in several other states where state Reform Party organizations were active. The Reform Party of Kansas nominated a slate of candidates, led by Iraq War veteran Richard Ranzau. In Colorado's 4th congressional district, "fiscal conservative" Eric Eidsness (a former assistant U.S. Environmental Protection Agency administrator and Navy veteran) ran on the Reform Party ticket. He received 11.28 percent of the vote, five times the winning candidate's margin of victory; he later switched his affiliation to the Democratic Party. The Florida Reform Party granted use of its ballot line for governor to Max Linn of Florida Citizens for Term Limits (a Republican-leaning organization) in the 2006 Florida gubernatorial election. Linn retained professional campaign staff with connections to the Perot and Ventura campaigns, but received only 1.9 percent of the vote. By March 2007, the Reform Party had ballot access for the 2008 presidential election in four states (Florida, Kansas, Louisiana, Mississippi) and had already started petitioning in an additional four.

=== 2008 National Convention ===
The Reform Party held its 2008 National Convention in Dallas, July 18–20.

At the national convention, Ted Weill of Mississippi was nominated to be the party's 2008 presidential candidate. Frank McEnulty of California, the 2008 presidential candidate of the New American Independent Party, was nominated to be the party's 2008 vice-presidential candidate. David Collison of Texas was elected national chairman of the party. However, the party could not announce the results of the national convention on its web site until October because of a court order obtained by a dissident faction associated with the Independence Party of New York. Therefore, the Weill/McEnulty ticket appeared on the ballot only in Mississippi, in which it received 481 votes.

An erroneous news report was broadcast by ABC News that stated the party had endorsed John McCain. Frank MacKay of the dissident Independence Party of New York faction had made the endorsement, not the Reform Party USA. Reform Party USA Reference David Collison, the Reform Party's chairman, said during a 2009 interview, "Do you believe that any legitimate national party would endorse the Republican candidate for President rather than have a candidate of their own?"

The candidates for the nomination included:

- Alan Keyes, a former diplomat and Republican candidate
- Frank McEnulty, who eventually became the vice presidential nominee
- Ted Weill, an activist from Mississippi who eventually became the presidential nominee
- Daniel Imperato, who later joined the Libertarian Party
- Gene Chapman, a blogger from Denton, Texas

=== 2009 legal action ===
A long-standing feud in the party involved John Blare, of the Reform Party of California, and the Reform Party officers.

On December 4, 2009, a New York Federal judge heard MacKay v Crews on the question of who are the legal Reform Party officers. On December 16, 2009, the judge ruled in favor of David Collison's faction.

Collison said: "After over two years of litigation in Texas and New York, it is my profound pleasure to announce that US District Court Judge Joseph Bianco of the Eastern District of New York has ruled in our favor, and has further reinforced the 2008 ruling of Judge Carl Ginsberg of the 193rd District Court in Texas."

=== 2010 ===
In January 2010, Central Intelligence Agency (CIA) operations officer Charles S. Faddis announced his support of the party in The Baltimore Sun: "I have decided to throw in my lot with the Reform Party of the United States." Faddis later left the party, and ran in 2016 for Maryland's 5th congressional district as a Republican.

In February 2010, former Reform Party Chairman Pat Choate emerged to discuss the appeal of the Tea Party movement, contrasting it with Ross Perot's party, saying: "The difference with the Tea Party is it's been heavily pushed by a bunch of talk-show conservatives. You have the Republican Party attempting to use this as a means to pull independents or conservative independents to their policies, to their agenda."

In February, Congressional candidates filed to run as Reform Party candidates in all four of Mississippi's congressional districts, but none for any statewide offices. Among these were Barbara Dale Washer, Tracella Lou O'Hara Hill, and Anna Jewel Revies.

In April 2010, former Vice President Dan Quayle condemned the Reform Party on CBS, saying: "Many remember the Reform Party of the 1990s, which formed around the candidacy of Ross Perot. I sure do, because it eliminated any chance that President George H.W. Bush and I would prevail over Bill Clinton and Al Gore in 1992. Speaking on behalf of the Bush-Quayle campaign, to this day we firmly believe that Perot cost the Republican Party the White House."

In an April 28, 2010 interview with Monmouth University's student newspaper, Pat Choate remained suspicious of the Tea Party movement, saying: "At these [Tea Party] events, a professional Republican always speaks. What to me is questionable is that the Tea Parties endorse candidates, but never endorse Democrats—they seem to be a front for the Republican Party. We were seen as very serious. Perot gave millions, we fielded candidates, and we were a real threat to the status quo. The media treats the Tea Parties as a sign of dissatisfaction, and views them skeptically."

Kristin M. Davis, the Manhattan madam involved in the Eliot Spitzer scandal, announced on June 27, 2010, that she was running for governor on an independent line in New York State using the name, Reform Party without Reform Party authorization after failing to secure the Libertarian Party nomination. Davis condemned the Democrats and Republicans for catering to wealthy white males, saying: "Where are the women, the Hispanics, the African-Americans, and the gay people? We must reject their tired old thinking...."

On June 29, 2010, Reform Party National Committee chairman David Collison delivered Davis a cease-and-desist notice demanding that she immediately change the name under which she was seeking to run for governor. Davis made no attempt to obtain permission to run as an official Reform Party candidate, and therefore withdrew her use of the Reform Party name. Davis was not a member of the Reform Party. Davis changed her Independent Ballot Line name and filed as an independent candidate by obtaining the required signatures needed in New York State to run for governor on the "Anti-Prohibition" line.

=== 2012 presidential election ===
The Reform Party held its 2012 National Convention in Philadelphia, August 11–12, 2012.

At the national convention, the Reform Party nominated Andre Barnett from New York for president and Ken Cross from Arkansas for vice president. Among those who sought the presidential nomination before dropping out several months prior to the convention were former Savannah State University football coach Robby Wells, economist Laurence Kotlikoff, historian Darcy Richardson, and former Louisiana Governor Buddy Roemer.

=== 2016 presidential election ===
The Reform Party co-nominated the American Delta Party's presidential and vice-presidential candidates Rocky de la Fuente and Michael Steinberg as their 2016 presidential ticket. However, in 2016, De La Fuente ran as a Democrat in the presidential and U.S. Senate primaries too.

=== 2020 presidential election ===
On June 20, 2020, during a virtual convention, the Reform Party again nominated Rocky de la Fuente for president. De la Fuente defeated three other recognized candidates, Max Abramson, Souraya Faas, and Ben Zion (formerly the nominee for the Transhumanist Party). Darcy Richardson from Florida was nominated for vice president.

=== 2024 presidential election ===
In September 2023, the Reform Party lost its ballot access in Florida, leaving the party with no state ballot lines. At their party convention on May 23, 2024, the Reform Party nominated the Kennedy Jr./Shanahan ticket for president and vice president respectively. The Reform Party filed paperwork for re-qualification in May 2024, which would place Kennedy and Shanahan on the ballot in Florida. Kennedy withdrew from the race in August and endorsed Donald Trump and withdrew his name from the Florida ballot on August 23.

== Platform ==
The Reform Party platform includes the following:

- Maintaining a balanced budget, eventually passing a Balanced Budget Amendment and changing budgeting practices, and paying down the federal debt
- Campaign finance reform, including strict limits on campaign contributions and the outlawing of political action committees (PACs)
- Enforcement of existing immigration laws and opposition to illegal immigration
- Free or expanded access to healthcare and education
- Term limits on U.S. Representatives and Senators
- Election system reforms such as implementation of ranked choice voting, adjustments to the Electoral College system, among others
- Federal elections held on weekends or Election Day (on a Tuesday) made a national holiday

== Best results in major races ==
Office	Percent	District	Year	Place	Candidate
President	14.19%	Maine	1996	3rd	Ross Perot
President	13.56%	Montana	1996	3rd	Ross Perot
President	12.71%	Idaho	1996	3rd	Ross Perot
US Senate	15.42%	Mississippi	2002	2nd	Shawn O'Hara
US Senate	8.37%	Kansas	2002	3rd	George Cook
US Senate	6.98%	Minnesota	1996	3rd	Dean Barkley
US House	33.70%	Florida District 5	1998	2nd	Jack Gargan
US House	21.09%	California District 21	1998	2nd	John Evans
US House	20.99%	Mississippi District 1	2004	2nd	Barbara Dale Washer
Governor	36.99%	Minnesota	1998	1st	Jesse Ventura
Governor	15.33%	Kentucky	1999	3rd	Gatewood Galbraith
Governor	2.08%	New Hampshire	1996	3rd	Fred Bramante

== Presidential tickets ==
Year	Presidential nominee	Home state	Previous positions	Vice presidential nominee	Home state	Previous positions	Votes	Note(s)	Cite
1996	Ross Perot (campaign)	Texas	Businessman; Candidate for President of the United States (1992)	Pat Choate	District of Columbia	Economist	8,085,294 (#3) (8.4%); 0 EV		
2000	Pat Buchanan (campaign)	Virginia	White House Director of Communications (1985–1987); Candidate for President of the United States (1992; 1996)	Ezola Foster	California	Activist; Candidate for President of the United States (1992, 1996); Richard Nixon's White House Communications Director (1985-1987)	448,895 (#4) (0.4%); 0 EV		
2004	Ralph Nader (campaign)	Connecticut	Lawyer, activist Candidate for President of the United States (1996; 2000)	Peter Camejo	California	Candidate for Mayor of Berkeley (1967); Candidate for President of the United States (1976); Candidate for Governor of California (2002; 2003)	465,151 (0.4%); 0 EV	Nader and Camejo ran as independents, receiving the additional nomination of the Reform Party	
2008	Ted Weill	Mississippi	Nominee for United States Senator from Mississippi (1996)	Frank McEnulty	California	Businessman	481 (0.0004%); 0 EV		
2012	Andre Barnett	New York	Entrepreneur	Ken Cross	Arkansas	Engineer, businessman	962 (0.001%); 0 EV		
2016	Rocky De La Fuente (campaign)	California	Businessman	Michael Steinberg	Florida	Lawyer; Candidate for Florida's 47th State House of Representatives district (2002; 2010); Candidate for Florida's 11th congressional district (2006)	33,136 (#9) (0.02%); 0 EV	also the nominees of the American Delta Party	
2020	Rocky De La Fuente (campaign)	California	Businessman; Candidate for President of the United States (2016)	Darcy Richardson	Florida	Historian; Author; 2018 Reform Party Nominee for Governor of Florida	88,238 (#5) (0.06%); 0 EV		
2024	Robert F. Kennedy Jr. (campaign)	California	Attorney, activist	Nicole Shanahan	California	Attorney, technologist	681,450 (#4) (0.46%); 0 EV	ran as independents, received additional nomination of the Reform Party	

== Active state affiliates ==
The party's active state affiliates are:

- Reform Party of California
- Reform Party of Montana
- Reform Party of New Jersey (reorganized in 2010)
- Reform Party of North Carolina
- Reform Party of New York State
- Reform Party of Tennessee
- Reform Party of Texas
- Reform Party of Virginia
- Reform Party of Wisconsin
- Reform Party of Florida

== See also ==
- Forward Party
- No Labels
