= Ross Perot =

American businessman and politician (1930–2019)

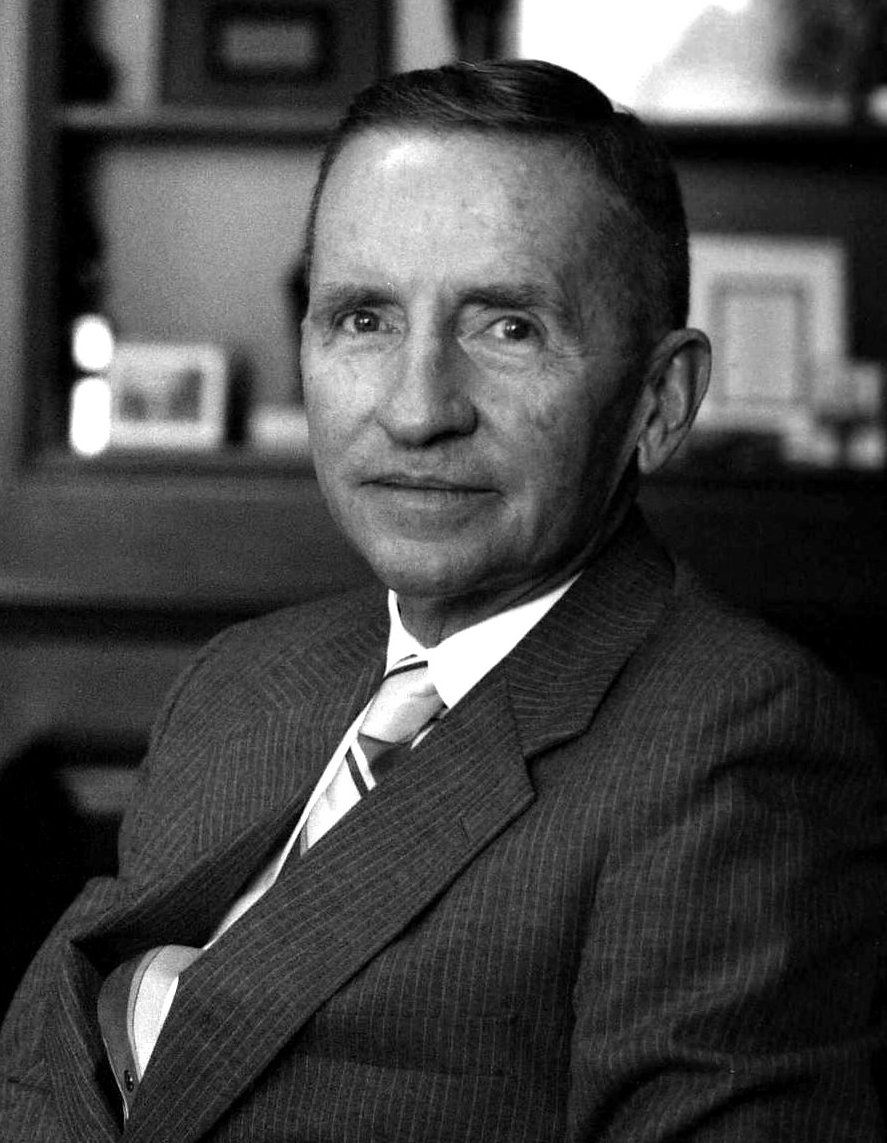
- Portrait by Allan Warren, 1986
- Born: Henry Ross Perot; June 27, 1930; Texarkana, Texas, U.S.
- Died: July 9, 2019 (aged 89); Dallas, Texas, U.S.
- Resting place: Sparkman-Hillcrest Memorial Park Cemetery, Dallas
- Other name: H. Ross Perot
- Education: Texarkana College; United States Naval Academy (BS)
- Occupations: Businessman; politician; philanthropist
- Political party: Independent (before 1995); Reform (1995–2000); Republican (2000–2019)
- Spouse: Margot Birmingham (m. 1956)
- Children: 5, including Ross Jr.
- Military career
- Branch: United States Navy
- Service years: 1953–1957
- Rank: Lieutenant
- Website: Official website

Signature
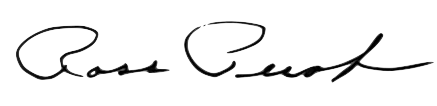

Henry Ross Perot (/pəˈroʊ/ pə-ROH; June 27, 1930 – July 9, 2019) was an American businessman, politician, and philanthropist. He was the founder and chief executive officer of Electronic Data Systems and Perot Systems. He ran an independent campaign in the 1992 U.S. presidential election and a third-party campaign in the 1996 U.S. presidential election as the nominee of the Reform Party, which was formed by grassroots supporters of Perot's 1992 campaign. Although he failed to carry a single state in either election, both campaigns were among the strongest presidential showings by a third party or independent candidate in U.S. history.

Born and raised in Texarkana, Texas, Perot became a salesman for IBM after serving in the United States Navy. In 1962, he founded Electronic Data Systems, a data processing service company. In 1984, General Motors bought a controlling interest in the company for $2.4 billion ($6.3 billion in 2025). Perot established Perot Systems in 1988 and was an angel investor for NeXT, a computer company founded by Steve Jobs after he left Apple. Perot also became heavily involved in the Vietnam War POW/MIA issue, arguing that hundreds of American servicemen were left behind in Southeast Asia after the Vietnam War. During the presidency of George H. W. Bush, Perot became increasingly active in politics and strongly opposed both the Gulf War and the ratification of the North American Free Trade Agreement.

In 1992, Perot announced his intention to run for president and advocated a balanced budget, an end to the outsourcing of jobs, and the enactment of electronic direct democracy. A June 1992 Gallup poll showed Perot leading a three-way race against President Bush and presumptive Democratic nominee Bill Clinton. Perot withdrew from the race in July, but re-entered the race in early October after he qualified for all 50 state ballots. He chose Admiral James Stockdale as his running mate and appeared in the 1992 debates with Bush and Clinton. In the election, Perot did not win any electoral votes, but won over 19.7 million votes for an 18.9% share of the popular vote. He won support from across the ideological and partisan spectrum, but performed best among self-described moderates. Perot ran for president again in 1996, establishing the Reform Party as a vehicle for his campaign. He won 8.4 percent of the popular vote against President Clinton and Republican nominee Bob Dole.

Perot did not seek public office again after 1996. He endorsed Republican George W. Bush over Reform nominee Pat Buchanan in the 2000 election and supported Republican Mitt Romney in 2008 and 2012. In 2009, Dell acquired Perot Systems for $3.9 billion ($5.7 billion in 2025). According to Forbes, Perot was the 167th richest person in the United States as of 2016. He died from leukemia at the age of 89 in Dallas, Texas, in July 2019.

== Early life, education, and military career ==
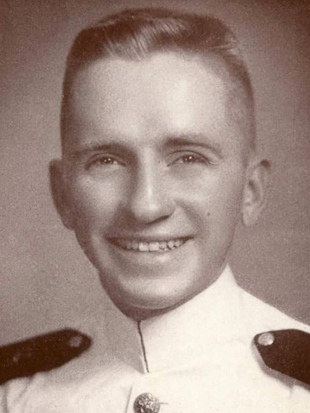
Perot in 1953

Henry Ross Perot was born in Texarkana, Texas, on June 27, 1930, the son of Lula May (née Ray) and Gabriel Ross Perot, a commodity broker specializing in cotton contracts. He had an older brother, Gabriel Perot Jr., who died as a toddler. His patrilineal line traces back to a French-Canadian immigrant to the colony of Louisiana in the 1740s.

Perot attended a local private school, Patty Hill, before graduating from Texas High School in Texarkana in 1947. His first job, at eight years old, was helping to distribute the Texarkana Gazette as a paperboy. He joined the Boy Scouts of America and made Eagle Scout in 1942, after 13 months in the program, and was a recipient of the Distinguished Eagle Scout Award. One of Perot's childhood friends was Hayes McClerkin, who later became the speaker of the Arkansas House of Representatives and a prominent lawyer in Texarkana, Arkansas.

From 1947 to 1949, he attended Texarkana Junior College, then entered the United States Naval Academy in 1949 and helped establish its honor system. Perot claimed his appointment notice to the academy—sent by telegram—was sent by W. Lee "Pappy" O'Daniel, Texas's 34th governor and former senator. Perot served as a junior officer on a destroyer, and later, an aircraft carrier from 1953 to 1957. Perot, who had only ever owned one pair of shoes at a time, was shocked to find that he was issued multiple pairs of shoes in the navy, which he would later point to as "possibly my first example of government waste". Perot then went to the Naval Reserve, which he left on June 30, 1961, with the rank of lieutenant. His father died when Perot was 25 years old.

In 1956, Perot married Margot Birmingham, whom he met on a blind date as a midshipman docked in Baltimore.

== Business ==
After he left the Navy in 1957, Perot became a salesman for IBM. He quickly became a top employee (one year, he fulfilled his annual sales quota in two weeks) and tried to pitch his ideas to supervisors, who largely ignored him. He left IBM in 1962 to found Electronic Data Systems (EDS) in Dallas, Texas, and courted large corporations for his data processing services. Perot was denied bids for contracts 77 times before receiving his first contract. EDS received lucrative contracts from the US government in the 1960s, computerizing Medicare records. EDS went public in 1968, and the stock price rose from $16 a share to $160 within days. Fortune called Perot the "fastest, richest Texan" in a 1968 cover story. In December 1969, his shares in EDS were briefly worth $1 billion. Perot gained some press attention for being "the biggest individual loser ever on the New York Stock Exchange" when his EDS shares dropped $445 million ($2.9 billion in today's money) in value in a single day in April 1970. While EDS boasted strong earnings in 1970, its exceptionally high price-to-earnings ratio, reaching 118 times earnings at its initial public offering in 1968, made it a prime target for a bear raid. The stock's vulnerability was compounded by the fact that a significant portion of the publicly traded shares were "weakly held" by fast-performance mutual funds prone to rapid selling at the first sign of trouble.

When the stock price began to decline on April 22, likely due to large-scale short selling, these institutional investors quickly unloaded their holdings, triggering a panic sell-off and a precipitous drop in the share price. This dramatic single-day decline in EDS stock was part of a broader collapse in the technology sector during the second quarter of 1970. The average computer stock plummeted 80% from its peak in late 1968. University Computing, for instance, suffered a devastating 93% loss in value. The overall market downturn, reflected in a 19% drop in the S&P 500 during that quarter, was further fueled by a recessionary environment, growing sociopolitical unrest related to the Vietnam War and events like the Kent State shootings, and a general loss of confidence in the market after a period of exuberant speculation. Coincidentally, the EDS crash occurred on the first Earth Day, adding to the symbolic significance of the event. In 1973, the Perot Affair with New York Governor Nelson Rockefeller questioned the awarding of contracts by the state to EDS. Perot had previously led the bailout of Dupont in 1970 through David Rockefeller and Chase Manhattan, with some accusing Perot's pact with the Rockefellers as questionable.

In 1984, General Motors bought a controlling interest in EDS for $2.4 billion ($6.3 billion). In 1985, Perot sold EDS to General Motors with the idea that he and EDS would have a leadership role within the company. However, Perot's plan was ignored by the management of General Motors, prompting Perot to leave and later found Perot Systems. Perot's experience with GM contributed to him becoming an outspoken critic of corporate America. In the same year, Perot became the second-richest man in the United States, only behind Sam Moore Walton, with a fortune estimated at $1.8 billion ($4.6 billion), according to the Forbes 400 list of the wealthiest people in the United States.

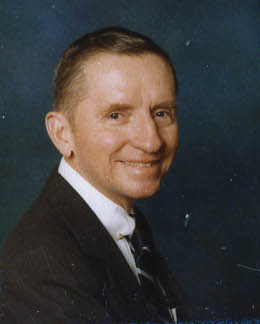
Perot in 1983

Just before the 1979 Iranian Revolution, the government of Iran imprisoned two EDS employees in a contract dispute. Perot organized and sponsored their rescue. The rescue team was led by retired United States Army Special Forces Colonel Arthur D. "Bull" Simons. When the team was unable to find a way to extract the two prisoners, they decided to wait for a group of revolutionaries to storm the jail and free all 10,000 inmates, many of whom were political prisoners. The two prisoners then connected with the rescue team, which led them out of Iran through a border crossing into Turkey. The exploit was recounted in the book On Wings of Eagles by Ken Follett. In 1986 this was turned into a two-part television mini-series (alternatively titled "Teheran") with the actor Burt Lancaster playing the role of Colonel Simons and Richard Crenna as Perot.

In 1984, Perot's Perot Foundation bought a very early copy of Magna Carta, one of only a few to leave the United Kingdom. The foundation lent it to the National Archives in Washington, D.C., where it was displayed alongside the Declaration of Independence and the Constitution of the United States. In 2007, the foundation sold it to David Rubenstein, managing director of The Carlyle Group for $21.3 million ($31.8 million) to be used "for medical research, for improving public education and for assisting wounded soldiers and their families". It remains on display at the National Archives.

After Steve Jobs lost the power struggle at Apple and left to found NeXT, his angel investor was Perot, who invested over $20 million. Perot believed in Jobs and did not want to miss out, as he had with his chance to invest in Bill Gates's fledgling Microsoft.

In 1988, he founded Perot Systems in Plano, Texas. His son, Ross Perot Jr., eventually succeeded him as CEO. In September 2009, Perot Systems was acquired by Dell for $3.9 billion ($5.7 billion).

== Political activities ==
=== Early political activities ===
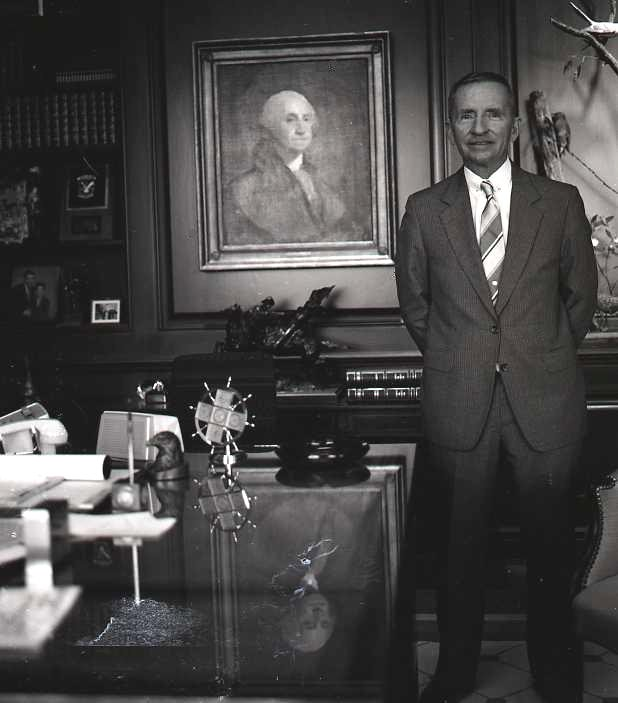
Perot with a portrait of George Washington in his office in 1986

After a visit to Laos in 1969, made at the request of the White House, in which he met with senior North Vietnamese officials, Perot became heavily involved in the Vietnam War POW/MIA issue. He believed that hundreds of American servicemen were left behind in Southeast Asia at the end of the U.S. involvement in the war, and that government officials were covering up POW/MIA investigations to avoid revealing a drug-smuggling operation used to finance a secret war in Laos. Perot engaged in unauthorized back-channel discussions with Vietnamese officials in the late 1980s, which led to fractured relations between Perot and the Reagan and George H. W. Bush administrations. In 1990, Perot reached an agreement with Vietnam's Foreign Ministry to become its business agent if diplomatic relations were normalized. Perot also launched private investigations of, and attacks upon, United States Department of Defense official Richard Armitage.

In Florida in 1990, retired financial planner Jack Gargan, employing a famous quotation from the 1976 movie Network, funded a series of "I'm mad as hell and I'm not going to take it anymore" newspaper advertisements denouncing Congress for voting to give legislators pay raises at a time when average wages nationwide were not increasing. Gargan later founded "Throw the Hypocritical Rascals Out" (THRO), which Perot supported.

Perot did not support President George H. W. Bush, and vigorously opposed the United States' involvement in the 1990–1991 Persian Gulf War. He unsuccessfully urged Senators to vote against the war resolution, and began to consider a presidential run.

=== 1992 presidential campaign ===
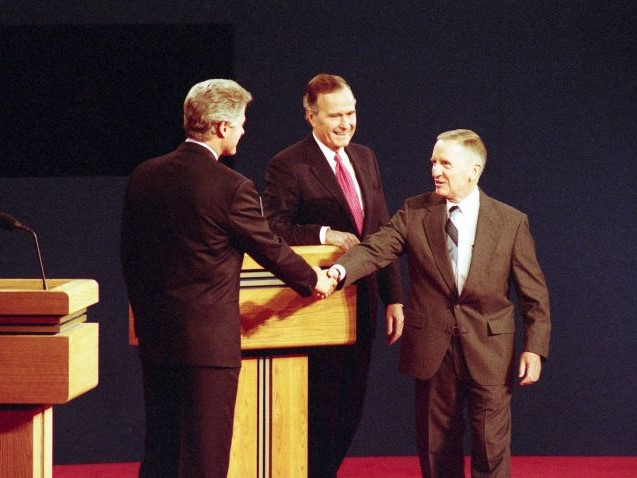
Perot meets Bill Clinton and George H. W. Bush at the third presidential debate at Michigan State University, October 19, 1992

On February 20, 1992, Perot appeared on CNN's Larry King Live and announced his intention to run as an independent if his supporters could get his name on the ballot in all 50 states. With such declared policies as balancing the federal budget, favoring certain types of gun control, ending the outsourcing of jobs and enacting electronic direct democracy via "electronic town halls", he became a potential candidate and soon polled roughly even with the two major-party candidates.

Perot denounced Congress for its inaction in a speech at the National Press Club in Washington, D.C., on March 18, 1992; he said:

This city has become a town filled with sound bites, shell games, handlers, media stuntmen who posture, create images, talk, shoot off Roman candles, but don't ever accomplish anything. We need deeds, not words, in this city.

Perot's candidacy received increasing media attention when the competitive phase of the primary season ended for the two major parties. With the insurgent candidacies of Republican Pat Buchanan and Democrat Jerry Brown winding down, Perot was the natural beneficiary of populist resentment toward establishment politicians. On May 25, 1992, he was featured on the cover of Time with the title "Waiting for Perot", an allusion to Samuel Beckett's play Waiting for Godot.

Several months before the Democratic and Republican conventions, Perot filled the vacuum of election news, as his supporters began petition drives to get him on the ballot in all 50 states. This sense of momentum was reinforced when Perot employed two savvy campaign managers in Democrat Hamilton Jordan and Republican Ed Rollins. While Perot was pondering whether to run for office, his supporters established a campaign organization United We Stand America. Perot was late in making formal policy proposals, but most of what he did call for was intended to reduce the deficit, such as a fuel tax increase and cutbacks to Social Security. In June, Perot led a Gallup poll with 39% of the vote.

In July, the Perot campaign fell into disarray and his polls fell sharply. The 1992 Democratic National Convention was held on Monday, July 13 through Thursday, July 16, during which time there was increased media coverage of the general election. The Milwaukee Sentinel reported that Perot's campaign managers were becoming increasingly disillusioned by Perot's unwillingness to follow their advice to be more specific on issues, and his need to be in full control of operations. The St. Petersburg Times reported such tactics as forcing volunteers to sign loyalty oaths. Perot's poll numbers had slipped to 25%, and his advisers warned that if he continued to ignore them, he would fall into single digits. Hamilton Jordan (a high-ranking manager in the Perot campaign) allegedly threatened to quit, but senior campaign officials denied this.

On July 15, Ed Rollins resigned after Perot fired advertisement specialist Hal Riney, who had worked with Rollins on the Reagan campaign. Rollins would later claim that a member of the campaign accused him of being a Bush plant with ties to the Central Intelligence Agency. Amid the chaos, Perot's support fell to 20%. The next day, Perot announced on Larry King Live that he would not seek the presidency. He explained that he did not want the House of Representatives to decide the election if the result caused the electoral college to be split. Perot eventually stated the reason was that he received threats that digitally altered photographs would be released by the Bush campaign to sabotage his daughter's wedding. Whatever his reasons for withdrawing, his reputation was badly damaged. Many of his supporters felt betrayed, and public opinion polls subsequently showed a largely negative view of Perot that was absent before his decision to end the campaign.

In September, he qualified for all 50 state ballots. On October 1, he announced his intention to re-enter the presidential race. He campaigned in 16 states and spent an estimated $12.3 million of his own money. Perot employed the innovative strategy of purchasing half-hour blocks of time on major networks for infomercial-type campaign advertisements; this advertising garnered more viewership than many sitcoms, with one Friday night program in October attracting 10.5 million viewers.

At one point in June, Perot led the polls with 39% (versus 31% for Bush and 25% for Clinton). Just prior to the debates, Perot received 7–9% support in nationwide polls. The debates likely played a significant role in his ultimate receipt of almost 19% of the popular vote. Although his answers during the debates were often general, Frank Newport of Gallup concluded that Perot "convincingly won the first debate, coming in significantly ahead of both the Democratic challenger Clinton and incumbent President George H.W. Bush". In the debate, he remarked:

Keep in mind our Constitution predates the Industrial Revolution. Our founders did not know about electricity, the train, telephones, radio, television, automobiles, airplanes, rockets, nuclear weapons, satellites, or space exploration. There's a lot they didn't know about. It would be interesting to see what kind of document they'd draft today. Just keeping it frozen in time won't hack it.

In the 1992 election, he received 18.9% of the popular vote, about 19,741,065 votes, but no electoral college votes, making him the most successful non-major-party presidential candidate in terms of share of the popular vote since Theodore Roosevelt in the 1912 election. Unlike Perot, however, multiple third-party candidates since Roosevelt had won electoral college votes: Robert La Follette in 1924, Strom Thurmond in 1948, and George Wallace in 1968. Compared with Thurmond and Wallace, who won a small number of Southern states, Perot's vote was more evenly spread across the country. He won 4.25% of votes in Washington, DC, his lowest result of any state or territory that year, a better result than Wallace's 1.47% in Hawaii; Wallace didn't have ballot access in Washington, DC. Perot managed to finish second in two states: in Maine, Perot received 30.44% of the vote—ahead of part-time resident Bush's 30.39% (Clinton won Maine with 38.77%); and in Utah, Perot received 27.34% of the vote—ahead of Clinton's 24.65% (Bush won Utah with 43.36%). Although Perot did not win a state, he received a plurality of votes in some counties. His popular vote total is still by far the most ever garnered for a non-major-party candidate, almost double the previous record set by Wallace in 1968.

A detailed analysis of voting demographics revealed that Perot's support drew heavily from across the political spectrum, with 20% of his votes coming from self-described liberals, 27% from self-described conservatives, and 53% coming from self-described moderates. Economically, however, the majority of Perot voters (57%) were middle class, earning between $15,000 and $49,000 annually, with the bulk of the remainder drawn from the upper-middle class (29% earning more than $50,000 annually). Exit polls also showed that 38% of Perot voters would have otherwise voted for Bush, and 38% would have voted for Clinton. Though there were widespread claims that Perot acted as a "spoiler", post-election analysis suggested that his presence in the race likely did not affect the outcome. According to Seymour Martin Lipset, the 1992 election had several unique characteristics. Voters felt that economic conditions were worse than they actually were, which harmed Bush. A strong third-party candidate was a rare event. Liberals launched a backlash against 12 years of a conservative White House. The chief factor was Clinton's uniting his party, and winning over a number of heterogeneous groups. In 2016, FiveThirtyEight described the theory that Perot was a spoiler as "unlikely".

Based on his performance in the popular vote in 1992, Perot was entitled to receive federal election funding for 1996. Perot remained in the public eye after the election and championed opposition to the North American Free Trade Agreement (NAFTA). During the campaign, he had urged voters to listen for the "giant sucking sound" of American jobs heading south to Mexico should NAFTA be ratified.

=== 1996 presidential campaign ===
Flyer from Perot's 1996 presidential campaign

Perot tried to keep his movement alive through the mid-1990s, continuing to speak about the increasing national debt. He was a prominent campaigner against NAFTA, and frequently claimed that American manufacturing jobs would go to Mexico. On November 10, 1993, Perot debated with then-Vice President Al Gore on the issue on Larry King Live with an audience of 16 million viewers. Perot's behavior during the debate was a source of mirth thereafter, including his repeated pleas to "let me finish" in his southern drawl. The debate was seen by many as effectively ending Perot's political career. Support for NAFTA went from 34% to 57%.

In 1995, he founded the Reform Party, which focused on fiscal conservatism and electoral reform, and won their presidential nomination for the 1996 United States presidential election. His vice presidential running mate was Pat Choate. Because of the ballot access laws, he had to run as an independent on many state ballots. Perot received 8% of the popular vote in 1996, lower than in the 1992 race, but still an unusually successful third-party showing by U.S. standards. He spent much less of his own money in this race than he had four years prior, and he also allowed other people to contribute to his campaign, unlike his prior race. One common explanation for the decline was Perot's exclusion from the presidential debates, based on the preferences of the Democratic and Republican party candidates. Law professor Jamie Raskin filed a lawsuit over Perot's exclusion years later.

=== Later activities ===
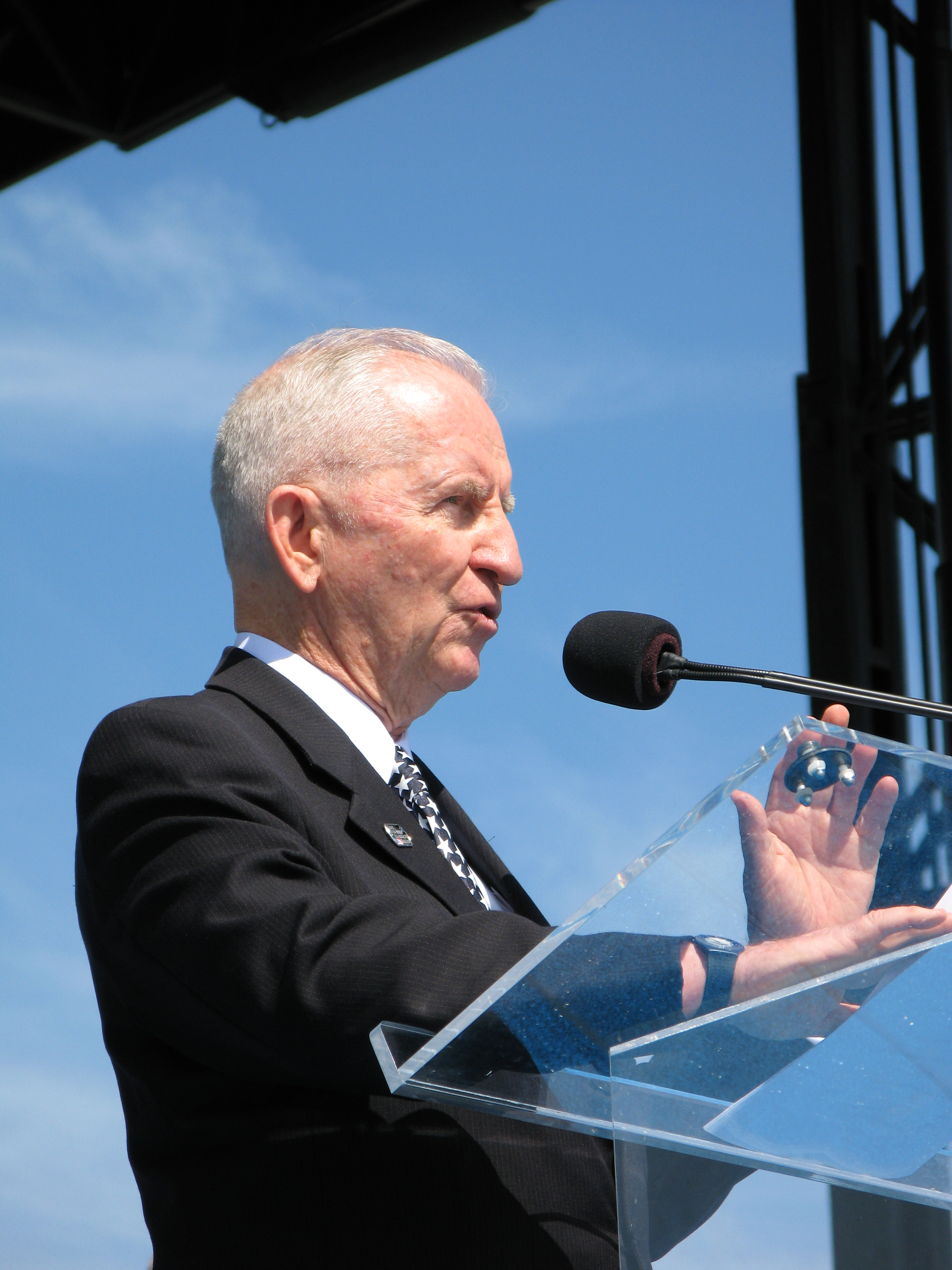
Perot addresses the audience at the "A Time of Remembrance" ceremony in Washington, D.C., September 20, 2008

In the 2000 presidential election, Perot refused to become openly involved with the internal Reform Party dispute between supporters of Pat Buchanan and John Hagelin. Perot was reportedly unhappy with what he saw as the disintegration of the party, as well as his own portrayal in the press; thus, he chose to remain quiet. He appeared on Larry King Live four days before the election and endorsed George W. Bush for president. Despite his earlier opposition to NAFTA, Perot remained largely silent about expanded use of guest-worker visas in the United States, with Buchanan supporters attributing this silence to his corporate reliance on foreign workers.

In 2005, Perot was asked to testify before the Texas Legislature in support of proposals to extend access to technology to students, including making laptops available to them. He supported changing the process of buying textbooks by making e-books available and by allowing schools to purchase books at the local level instead of going through the state. In an April 2005 interview, Perot expressed concern about the state of progress on issues that he had raised in his presidential runs.

In January 2008, Perot publicly came out against Republican candidate John McCain and endorsed Mitt Romney for president. He also announced that he would soon be launching a new website with updated economic graphs and charts. In June 2008, his blog launched, focusing on entitlements (Medicare, Medicaid, Social security), the U.S. national debt, and related issues. In 2012, Perot endorsed Romney for president again. Perot did not give any endorsements for the 2016 election.

== Political views ==
Perot did not fit the usual political stereotypes; his views were seen as either pragmatic or populist, depending on the observer, and usually focused on his economic policy, such as balancing the budget, to gain support from both Democratic and Republican voters. He is often considered a radical centrist due to his populism and lack of clear left or right-wing views. Perot supported stricter gun control such as an assault weapons ban and supported increased research on AIDS. Perot was hesitant on covering the issue of gay rights during his 1992 campaign, but openly supported gay rights in 1996.

Perot spoke in favor of a "comprehensive national health care plan — one that would be akin to Medicare but for all Americans, not just the needy". He also became known for his opposition to NAFTA; Perot believed that the power of corporations must be curbed, and saw the transfer of jobs to other countries as a symbol of corruption and inequality. He argued that such trade agreements only benefited the companies while robbing the U.S. of its tax base and blue-collar jobs. Perot famously stated during the October 15 debate that NAFTA would create a "giant sucking sound" on American jobs.

The populism of Ross Perot is hard to define and is a contested topic amongst political scientists. Perot was described as a "classical populist", liberal populist, "telepopulist" and also a "third way" populist. Neal Allen and Brian J. Brox argue that Perot was neither left nor right-wing ideologically, and focused first and foremost on promoting reforms of the political process and grassroots democracy; despite this, they also found some notable similarities between Perot and the left-wing populism of Ralph Nader, and the average Perot voter had liberal leanings.

Anton Pelinka described Perot's ideology as the "populism of the centre", presenting a distinct form of populism that significantly differed from left-wing and right-wing populist movements that appeared in the USA. Matthijs Rooduijn argues that Perot was an example of a liberal populist with centre-left leanings, noting his hostility to Reaganomics - in the 1992 election, Perot stated that U.S. was in crisis caused by "the decade of greed, the era of trickle-down economics". In his famous The Populist Explosion: How the Great Recession Transformed American and European Politics publication, John Judis wrote that "Perot represented a left and center-left populism", in the tradition of the Populist Party and Huey Long. According to Judis, Perot "represented the first clear repudiation of the neoliberal agenda."

Regarding foreign policy, Perot was an outspoken opponent of the Gulf War and condemned Bush for the military intervention against Iraq. He instead promoted a more isolationist foreign policy, arguing that USA should focus on rebuilding its economy. In his 1992 presidential campaign, Perot stated that his "highest foreign policy priority is to get our house in order and make America work again". He attacked Bush for his ties to Saddam Hussein prior to the invasion of Kuwait - according to Perot, the Bush administration covertly aided Hussein's chemical weapons programs and turned a blind eye to Iraqi plans against Kuwait, instructing April Glaspie to greenlight Hussein's invasion on assumption that he would only seize Kuwait's northern oil fields. Perot claimed that Bush invaded Iraq because its actions threatened Bush's "manhood", and stated: "off we go into the wild blue yonder with the lives of our servicemen at risk because of 10 years of stupid mistakes".

Perot also focused on anti-lobbying and political reform proposals - he favored a presidential line item veto against "pork barrel spending and waste", elimination of political action committees (PACs) to curb the influence of special interest groups, replacement of the Gramm–Rudman–Hollings Balanced Budget Act with a different balanced budget apparatus that would focus on limiting "tricks, loopholes, and improper accounting procedures" and a ban on exit polling during elections. He also postulated a ban on lobbying.

From 1992, Perot was a pro-choice activist, and a strong supporter of Planned Parenthood. He stated that poorer women in particular should have access to abortions via federal funding. From 2000, he was pro-choice reluctantly.

=== Economic policy ===
Perot believed taxes should be increased on the wealthy, while spending should be cut to help pay off the national debt. Perot also believed the capital gains tax should be increased, while giving tax breaks to those starting new businesses.

"We cut the capital gains tax rate from a maximum rate of 35% to a maximum rate that got as low as 20% during the 1980s. Who got the benefit? The rich did, of course, because that's who owns most of the capital assets."

— Not For Sale at Any Price

Together with increased taxes on the wealthy, Perot also supported curbing entitlement payments and tax rebates to the affluent, and spoke in favor of eliminating the government's air fleet and other Washington perks for legislators, mocking the privileges that the US legislators enjoyed. He also argued that the government should protect the job base through intervention in the market. He spoke in support of creating a national industrial ministry based on the Japanese Ministry of International Trade and Industry, which would increase state control over large businesses and direct their investment. Perot stressed that the government should ensure that both public and private investments would target the "industries of the future". When asked about objections to his plans from free-market advocates, Perot said: "Don't they realize that the biogenetics industry is the result of our federally funded research universities and the National Institutes of Health?"

Perot was strongly opposed to neoliberalism, and was credited with marking the "first clear repudiation" of the neoliberal economic policies pursued by Ronald Reagan:

"A disturbing trend has emerged from the decade of greed, the era of trickle-down economics and the period of capital gains tax manipulation. We are headed for a two-class society."

— Pox Populi: Ross Perot and the corruption of populism. The New Republic. Sean Wilentz. August 9, 1993. Retrieved August 14, 2024.

In his 1993 book Not For Sale at Any Price, Perot expressed support for giving tax cuts for small and medium-sized enterprises, as opposed to larger corporations. Additionally, Perot supported a balanced budget amendment, stating, "spending should not exceed revenue for 27 consecutive years." On trade, Perot stated that NAFTA caused the trade deficit between Mexico and the United States and a loss of manufacturing jobs. His position on free trade and NAFTA became his defining campaign principle of both the 1992 and 1996 presidential elections. Perot argued: "We have got to stop sending jobs overseas. It's pretty simple: If you're paying $12, $13, $14 an hour for factory workers and you can move your factory south of the border, pay a dollar an hour for labor, ... have no health care—that's the most expensive single element in making a car—have no environmental controls, no pollution controls and no retirement, and you don't care about anything but making money, there will be a giant sucking sound going south."

... when [Mexico's] jobs come up from a dollar an hour to six dollars an hour, and ours go down to six dollars an hour, and then it's leveled again. But in the meantime, you've wrecked the country with these kinds of deals.

— The 1992 Campaign: Transcript of 2nd TV Debate Between Bush, Clinton and Perot". The New York Times. October 16, 1992.

For the 1992 election, Perot unveiled an ambitious budget program that would balance the budget through redistributive policies. The most prominent element of the plan was Perot's proposal to raise the income tax bracket of 4% wealthiest households from 31 to 33 percent, and to raise it further to 35 percent in the future. Other points included increasing the taxable portion of Social Security benefits from 50 to 85 percent for recipients with income of $25,000 or more, as well as implementing a tax on hitherto tax-free employer-paid health insurance, with Perot arguing that a tax-free workplace insurance creates an unfair advantage for those who receive health insurance through their job. The plan also called for doubling cigarette tax and increasing gasoline tax by 50 cents a gallon. Perot explained that higher gasoline tax would help conserve energy and reduce pollution. He also advocated the creation of a special allowance for the workers disproportionately affected by the higher gasoline price. The plan also included massive cuts in military spending and scrapping the proposed space station project, which Perot derided as "a vacation home in space".

== Personal life and death ==
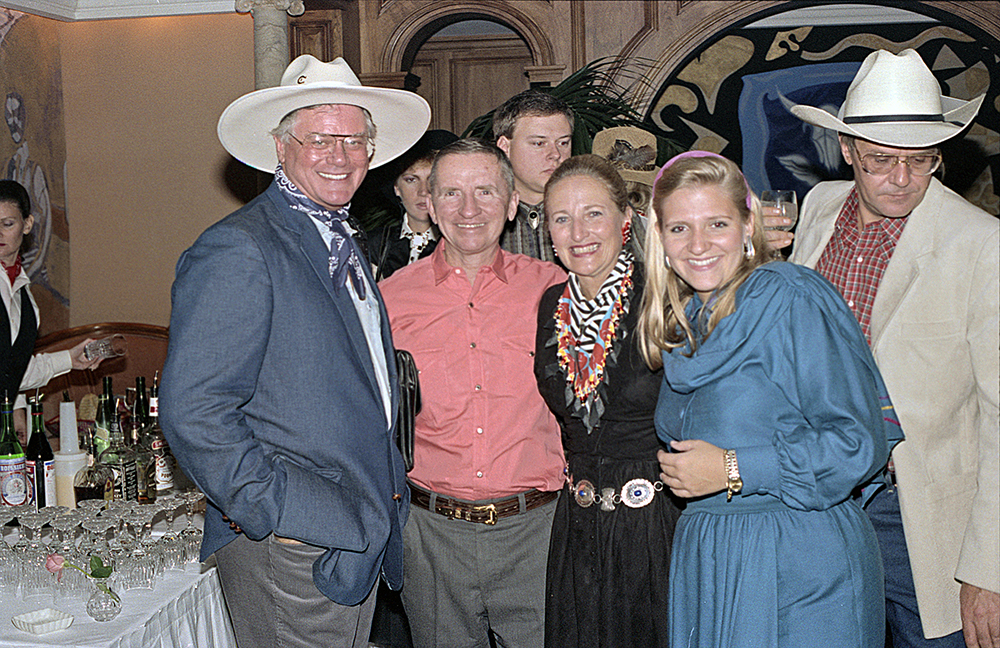
From left to right: Larry Hagman with Ross Perot and family in 1988

Perot and his wife Margot (née Birmingham; born November 15, 1933), a graduate of Goucher College, had five children including Ross Jr., and 19 grandchildren.

Perot was raised in the Methodist faith. However, he converted to Presbyterianism and became a member of the Highland Park Presbyterian Church in the late 1960s. Perot was described as very faithful in church attendance.

Perot died from leukemia in Dallas, Texas, on July 9, 2019, less than two weeks after his 89th birthday. At the time of his death, he had an estimated net worth of about $4.1 billion ($5.1 billion in 2025), and was ranked by Forbes as the 167th-richest person in the United States. He is buried at the Sparkman-Hillcrest Memorial Park Cemetery; a memorial service was held at Highland Park United Methodist Church, with 1,300 guests.

== Honors and achievements ==
- In 1970, he was the recipient of the Golden Plate Award of the American Academy of Achievement.
- In 1985, he was inducted into the Hall of Great Westerners of the National Cowboy & Western Heritage Museum.
- In 1986, Perot became the third American to receive the Winston Churchill Award for his efforts on behalf of American POWs in Vietnam in the 1960s and for organizing the rescue of two EDS employees from a prison in Iran.
- In 1980, he received the Oak Cliff Lions Clubs' "Humanitarian Award".
- In 1986, Perot received the S. Roger Horchow Award for Greatest Public Service by a Private Citizen, an award given out annually by Jefferson Awards.
- Perot was inducted into the Junior Achievement U.S. Business Hall of Fame in 1988.
- On April 22, 2009, Ross Perot was made an honorary Green Beret at the John F. Kennedy Special Warfare Center and School at Fort Bragg, North Carolina.
- In May 2009, he was appointed an honorary chairman of the OSS Society.
- On September 18, 2009, the Texarkana Independent School District named him (1947 graduate of Texas High School) as a 2009 Distinguished Alumnus.
- On October 15, 2009, the United States Military Academy at West Point awarded him with the distinguished Sylvanus Thayer Award.
- On April 20, 2010, Perot was presented with the Distinguished Leadership Award from the Command and General Staff College Foundation, Inc., Fort Leavenworth, Kansas.
- In honor of Perot's 80th birthday, the bridge connecting Walton and University drives in Texarkana, Texas, was named the H. Ross Perot Bridge.
- On October 2, 2010, Perot was given the William J. Donovan Award from the OSS Society at the Mandarin Oriental Hotel in Washington, D.C. He is the 26th recipient of the award.
- In September 2011, Perot accepted the Army Heritage Center Foundation's Boots on the Ground Award.
- On October 28, 2011, the Perot Museum of Nature and Science announced it was naming a new species of the dinosaur genus Pachyrhinosaurus after the Perot family. The new species is named Pachyrhinosaurus perotorum.

== Electoral history ==
1992 United States Presidential Election
Party	Candidate	Votes	%
	Bill Clinton/Al Gore	44,909,806	43.0%
	George H. W. Bush (incumbent)/ Dan Quayle (incumbent)	39,104,550	37.4%
	Ross Perot/James Stockdale	19,743,821	18.9%

1996 Reform Party presidential primaries
Party	Candidate	Votes	%
	Ross Perot	32,145	65.2%
	Richard Lamm	17,121	34.8%

1996 United States Presidential Election
Party	Candidate	Votes	%
	Bill Clinton (incumbent)/Al Gore (incumbent)	47,401,185	49.2%
	Bob Dole/Jack Kemp	39,197,469	40.7%
	Ross Perot/Pat Choate	8,085,294	8.4%

Party political offices
First	Reform nominee for President of the United States; 1996	Succeeded by Pat Buchanan
