= Pat Choate =

American economist (born 1941)

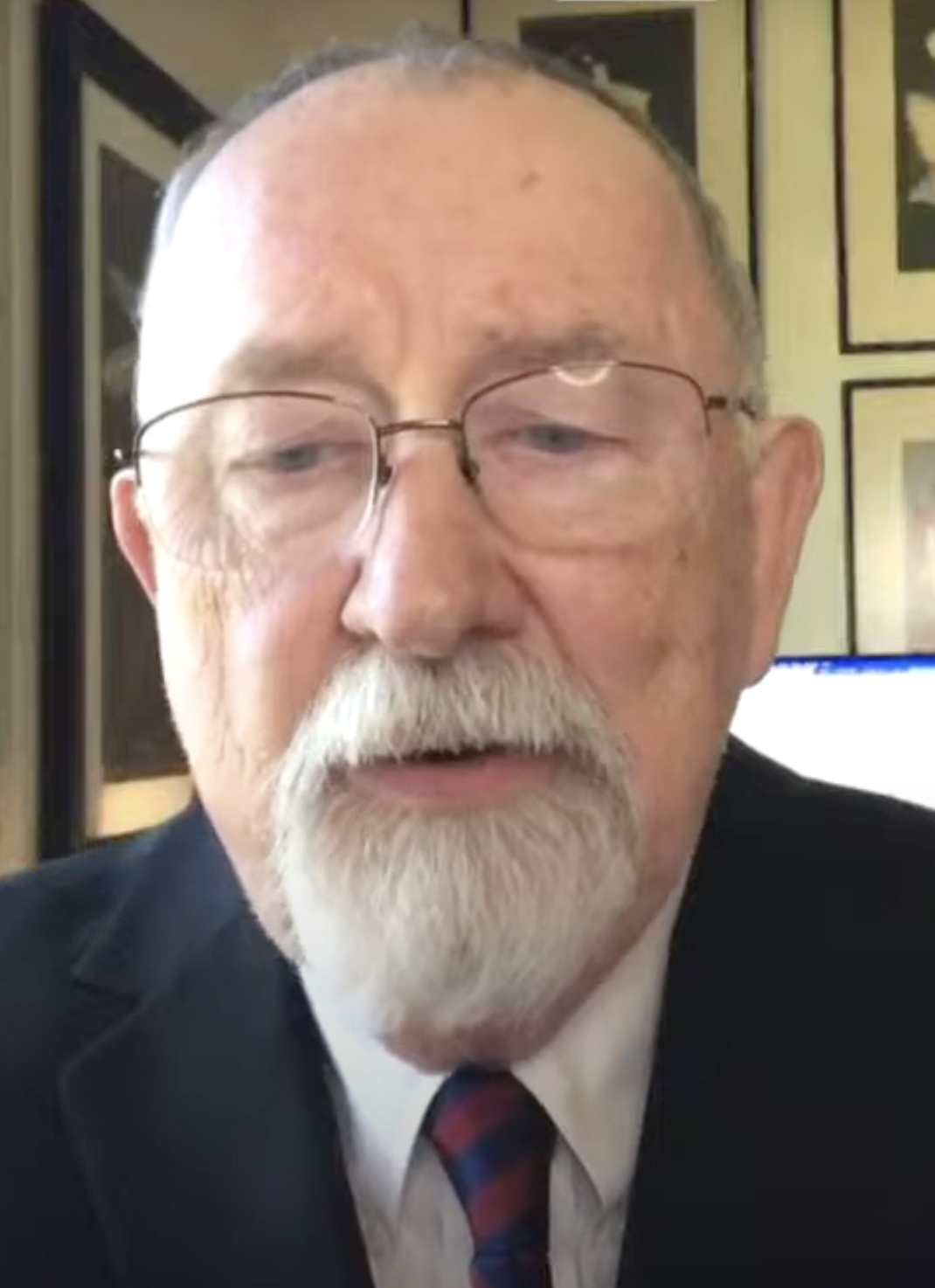
- Choate in 2021
- Born: Patrick Jeffrey Choate; April 27, 1941 (age 85); Maypearl, Texas, U.S.
- Education: University of Texas at Arlington (BA); University of Oklahoma (MA, PhD)
- Occupation: Economist
- Known for: Being the 1996 Reform Party candidate for Vice President of the United States
- Political party: Independent
- Spouse: Kay Casey

Patrick Jeffrey Choate (/ʃoʊt/; born April 27, 1941) is an American economist. He was the 1996 Reform Party candidate for Vice President of the United States, the running mate of Ross Perot. They had previously co-authored the book Save Your Job, Save Our Country (1993), which argued against the ratification of the North American Free Trade Agreement (NAFTA). In August 1996, the Federal Election Commission (FEC) certified a $22.055 million general-election public-funding grant to the Perot–Choate campaign, the first such grant to a third-party presidential campaign. In 1998, the FEC recognized Reform Party USA as a national committee under the Federal Election Campaign Act.

== Early life and education ==
Patrick Jeffrey Choate was born in Maypearl, Texas, the son of Betty Lee (Simpson) and Frank William Choate, farmers in Ellis County, Texas. Contemporary reporting described him as having been born on a cotton farm and his father as having risen from sharecropper to farm owner.

He attended public schools in Red Oak, Texas, graduating from Red Oak High School. Choate earned a Bachelor of Arts in Economics from the University of Texas at Arlington, followed by a Master of Arts and a PhD in Economics from the University of Oklahoma.

He was commissioned into the United States Army in 1963 after participating in ROTC and was discharged into the Army Reserve in 1965 after developing diabetes; contemporary reporting stated that he did not serve on active duty.

In 1994, the University of Oklahoma named him the Arthur Barto Adams Alumni Fellow in recognition of his continuing scholarship.

== Career ==
=== State Economic Development ===
Choate became Director of Research and Planning for the newly established Oklahoma Department of Industrial Development and Parks in 1965. He served as an economic advisor to Oklahoma Governors Henry Bellmon and Dewey Bartlett, representing them on the Ozarks Regional Commission. His doctoral dissertation, An Economic Development Program for Oklahoma, was adopted as the basis for the state's long-term economic development plan.

Choate later served as the first Commissioner of Tennessee's Department of Economic and Community Development, appointed during the administration of Governor Winfield Dunn. In this role, he developed Tennessee's state economic development plan and represented the state on the Appalachian Regional Commission; the commission's 1974 annual report listed Choate as Tennessee's state representative alongside Dunn.

=== Federal Service ===
Choate joined the U.S. Department of Commerce's Economic Development Administration (EDA), holding positions including Director of the Appalachian Regional Office in Huntington, West Virginia; Director of the Southern Regional Office in Atlanta, Georgia (1970–1972); and Director of the Office of Economic Research in Washington, D.C. (1975–1978). He served as a senior economist for the Carter administration's trade-agency reorganization project in the Office of Management and Budget. Between 1979 and 1980, he was a visiting Federal Fellow at the Academy for Contemporary Problems.

Choate has served on several Presidential and Congressional commissions on education, infrastructure and national security. He has also appeared as a witness before Congress across several decades, including hearings on infrastructure and public works, manufacturing and investment, and industrial policy. His testimony and published policy work have addressed infrastructure, U.S. economic competitiveness, the manufacturing base, intellectual property rights, and foreign influence in U.S. policymaking.

=== Corporate Policy ===
In March 1981, Choate joined TRW, Inc., a diversified industrial corporation, as a senior policy analyst. In 1985, he was promoted to Vice President of Policy, advising corporate leadership on economic trends and public-policy issues. Court records confirm that he advanced through two promotions to Vice President of the Office of Policy Analysis and remained with TRW until 1990.

During this period, Choate also served on multiple advisory panels, including the U.S. Senate Advisory Committee on Infrastructure, the Department of Labor's Commission on the American Workforce, as vice-chair of the Defense Science Board Task Force on Foreign Ownership and Control of U.S. Industry, and the National Science Council's Committee on Vocational Education and Economic Development in Depressed Areas. He was invited by the Reagan White House to participate in the Committee for the Next Agenda, preparing policy recommendations for the administration's second term.

=== Policy Advocacy and Research ===
He is known for work on economic development, infrastructure, worker training and intellectual property rights, as well as for criticism of unrestricted globalization and some U.S. free-trade policies. Choate has argued that heavy reliance on foreign supply chains can weaken U.S. national security, the domestic manufacturing base and labor-market stability.

In 1992, Choate established the Manufacturing Policy Project, a nonprofit policy institute focused on U.S. manufacturing and economic competitiveness. He co-founded the Congressional Economic Leadership Institute (CELI) and later described having served as its chair or co-chair for 18 years; contemporary reporting described CELI as a forum that brought members of Congress and business leaders together on competitiveness policy.

He has taught at George Washington University's Graduate School of Political Management, including a course called Advanced Issues Management. Contemporary accounts described him as a part-time faculty member or adjunct professor there. Choate advised Ross Perot on economic policy and, by 1993, was traveling with him and working on policy issues. In the 1996 U.S. presidential election, Perot selected Choate as his vice-presidential running mate.

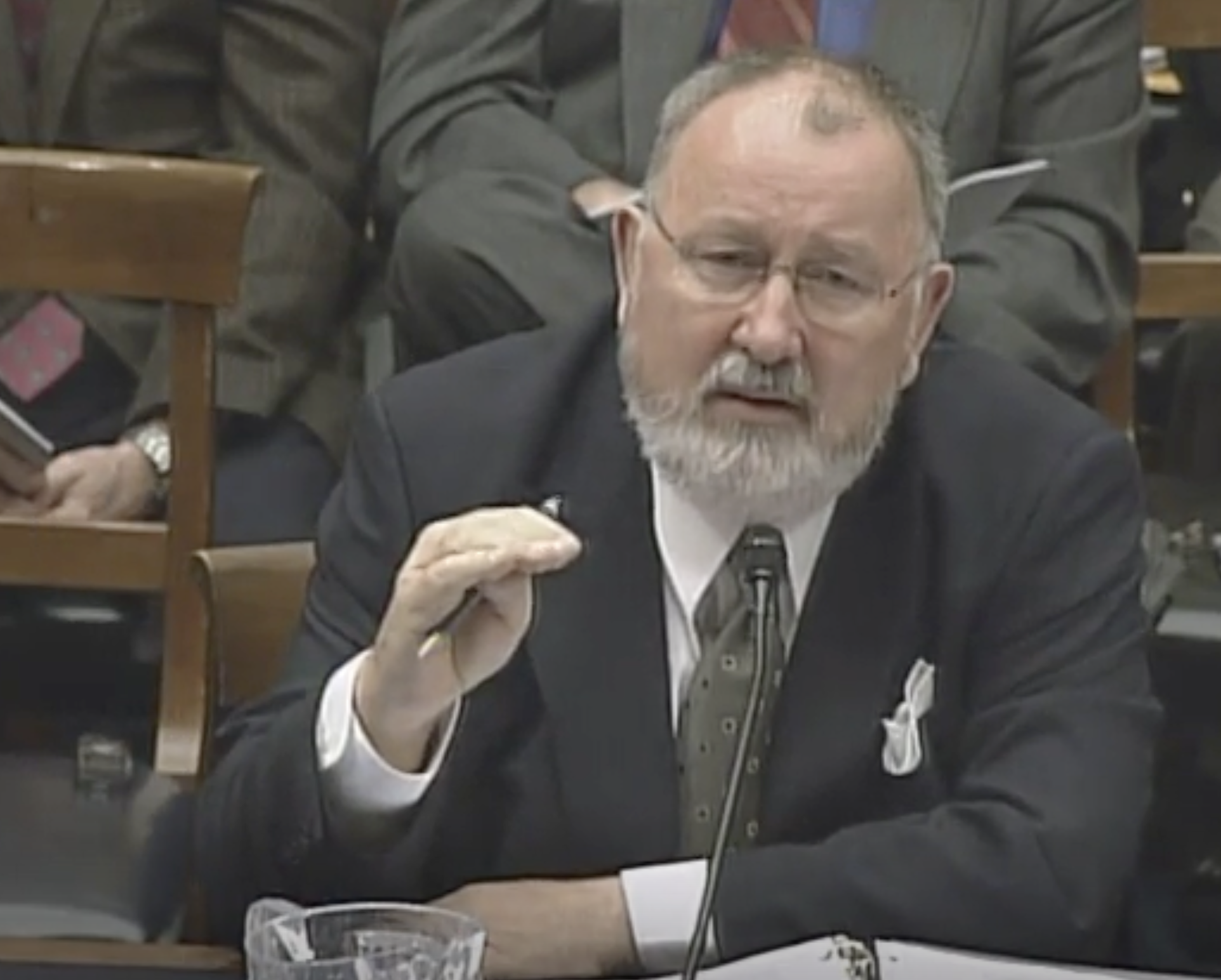
Choate in 2006

He hosted a weekly radio show, The Week Ahead, on the United Broadcasting Network in 1996, and The Pat Choate Show (also listed in industry directories as The Pat Choate Program) from 1997 to 2000.

== Electoral history ==
1996 United States presidential election

- Bill Clinton/Al Gore (Democratic) (Inc.) – 47,402,357 (49.2%) and 379 electoral votes (31 states and D.C. carried)
- Bob Dole/Jack Kemp (Republican) – 39,198,755 (40.7%) and 159 electoral votes (19 states carried)
- Ross Perot/Pat Choate (Reform) – 8,085,402 (8.4%) and 0 electoral votes

== Personal life ==
Choate is married to Glenda Kay Casey. He resides in Tucson, Arizona, with his wife.

== Bibliography ==
=== Books ===
External videos
- Booknotes interview with Choate on Agents of Influence, October 28, 1990, C-SPAN
- Presentation by Choate on Hot Property, May 16, 2005, C-SPAN
- Washington Journal interview with Choate on Dangerous Business, August 17, 2008, C-SPAN

- Agents of Influence: How Japan Manipulates America's Political and Economic System ISBN 978-0-394-57901-6 (Alfred A. Knopf, 1990).
- The High-Flex Society: Shaping America's Economic Future (co-authored with J. K. Linger, Alfred A. Knopf, 1986).
- America in Ruins: The Decaying Infrastructure (co-authored with Susan Walter, first published 1981; Duke Press Paperbacks edition, 1983).
- Thinking Strategically: A Primer for Public Leaders (co-authored with Susan Walter, 1984).
- Being Number One: Rebuilding the U.S. Economy (co-authored with Gail Garfield Schwartz, Lexington Books, 1980).
- Save Your Job, Save Our Country: Why NAFTA Must Be Stopped Now (co-authored with Ross Perot, Hyperion Press, 1993).
- Hot Property: The Stealing of Ideas in an Age of Globalization ISBN 978-0-375-40212-8 (Alfred A. Knopf, 2005).
- Dangerous Business: The Risks of Globalization for America (Alfred A. Knopf, 2008).
- Saving Capitalism: Keeping America Strong (Vintage Books, 2009).

=== Select Reports, Working Papers, and Congressional Testimony ===
- As Time Goes By: The Costs and Consequences of Delay (The Academy for Contemporary Problems, 1980).
- Revitalizing the U.S. Economy: A Brief for National Sectoral Policies (The Academy for Contemporary Problems, 1980).
- Retooling The American Work Force: Toward a National Training Strategy (Northeast-Midwest Institute, 1982).
- America's Competitive Challenge (The Business-Higher Education Forum, 1983).
- Rebuilding America, A Special Report from The Rebuild America Foundation (co-authored with Paul Krugman, Lester Thurow, and Robert Reich), 1988.
- "Tailored Trade: Dealing with the World as It Is," by Pat Choate and Juyne Linger, Harvard Business Review, January–February 1988.
- "Political Advantage: Japan's Campaign for America," by Pat Choate, Harvard Business Review, September–October 1990.
- Report by the Defense Science Board Task Force on Foreign Ownership and Control of U.S. Industry (United States Department of Defense, 1990).
- "Redressing the 'Democratic Deficit' in U.S. Trade Policy," in Future Visions for U.S. Trade Policy (Bruce Stokes, project director, Council on Foreign Relations, 1998).
- Democratizing U.S. Trade Policy (co-authored with Bruce Stokes, Council on Foreign Relations, 2001).
- Working Paper: Analysis of U.S.-China Advanced Technology Trade (co-authored with Edward Miller, U.S.-China Economic and Security Review Commission, 2005).
- Working Paper: A Great Wall of Patents: China and American Investors: Selected Consequences (U.S.-China Economic and Security Review Commission, 2005).
- Congressional Testimony: Domestic Manufacturing for a Clean Energy Future, House Appropriations Subcommittee on Energy and Water Development, March 17, 2021.
- Congressional Testimony: Renewing Prosperity in the Industrial Heartland: An Economic Agenda for Forgotten Communities, House Select Committee on Economic Disparity and Fairness in Growth, October 18, 2021.

Party political offices
First	Reform nominee for Vice President of the United States; 1996	Succeeded by Ezola Foster
