= Richard Lamm =

American politician (1935–2021)

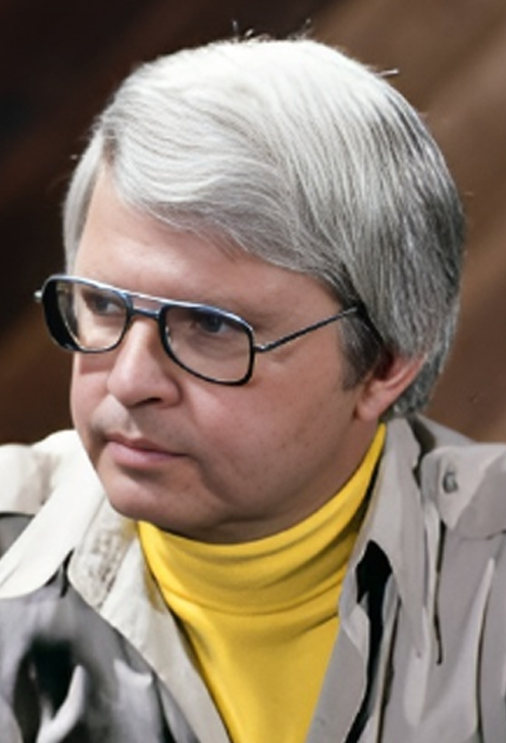
- Lamm in 1980

38th Governor of Colorado
- In office January 14, 1975 – January 13, 1987
- Lieutenant: George L. Brown; Nancy Dick
- Preceded by: John Vanderhoof
- Succeeded by: Roy Romer

Personal details
- Born: Richard Douglas Lamm; August 3, 1935 Madison, Wisconsin, U.S.
- Died: July 29, 2021 (aged 85) Denver, Colorado, U.S.
- Party: Democratic
- Other political affiliations: Reform (1996)
- Spouse: Dottie Vennard (m. 1963)
- Children: 2
- Education: University of Wisconsin, Madison (BA); University of California, Berkeley (JD)

Military service
- Allegiance: United States
- Branch/service: US Army
- Years of service: 1957–1959
- Rank: First Lieutenant

Richard Douglas Lamm (August 3, 1935 – July 29, 2021) was an American politician, writer, and attorney. He served three terms as the 38th governor of Colorado as a Democrat (1975–1987) and ran for the Reform Party's nomination for President of the United States in 1996. Lamm was a certified public accountant and was the co-director of the Institute for Public Policy Studies at the University of Denver.

== Early life and education ==
Richard Douglas Lamm was born on August 3, 1935, in Madison, Wisconsin, the son of Mary Louise (Townsend) and Edward Arnold Lamm, a coal company executive. He graduated from Mt Lebanon Sr. High School near Pittsburgh, Pennsylvania, and attended the University of Wisconsin–Madison, where he majored in accounting. Lamm spent his college summers working as a lumberjack in Oregon, a stockboy in New York, and helping out on an ore boat. Lamm graduated from college in 1957, then served one year of active duty as a first lieutenant in the United States Army at Fort Carson in Colorado and Fort Eustis in Virginia until switching to reserve duty in 1958.

From 1958 to 1960 Lamm lived in Salt Lake City, San Francisco, and Berkeley, holding jobs as an accountant, tax clerk, and a law clerk.

Lamm attended law school at the University of California, graduated in 1961, then moved to Denver in 1962, where he worked as an accountant and then set up a law practice. Lamm took to the Colorado lifestyle, becoming an avid skier, mountain climber, hiker, and member of the Colorado Mountain Club. He joined the faculty of the University of Denver in 1969 and was associated with the university for the rest of his life.

In 1963 he married Dottie Vennard, a former airline flight attendant; the couple had two children. In 1998, Dottie Lamm won the Democratic nomination for the United States Senate from Colorado, but lost in the general election to incumbent Republican Ben Nighthorse Campbell.

Lamm was selected as one of Time Magazine's "200 Young Leaders of America" in 1974, and won the Christian Science Monitor "Peace 2020" essay in 1985. In 1992, he was honored by the Denver Post and Historic Denver, Inc. as one of the "Colorado 100" - people who made significant contributions to Colorado and made lasting impressions on the state's history. Lamm was the recipient of the 1993 Humanist of the Year award from the American Humanist Association. He was Chairman of the Pew Health Professions Commission and a public member of the Accreditation Council for Graduate Medical Education.

== Political activities ==
=== Colorado House of Representatives ===
In 1964, he was elected to the Colorado House of Representatives as a member of the Democratic Party. In 1967, he drafted and succeeded in passing the nation's first liberalized abortion law. He was an early leader of the environmental movement, and was President of the First National Conference on Population and the Environment.

In 1972, as a member of the Colorado General Assembly, Lamm led the movement against Denver's hosting of the 1976 Winter Olympics, as part of a group known as Citizens for Colorado's Future (CCF). Denver had already been awarded the games, but the movement succeeded in cutting off public funding for the games, forcing the city to cancel its hosting. Innsbruck, Austria then replaced Denver as the host. Lamm's successful effort made him known statewide.

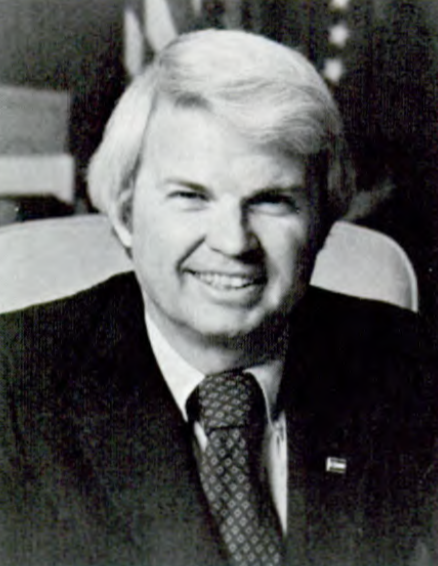
Lamm as governor

=== Colorado governor ===
Lamm ran for Governor of Colorado in 1974 on a platform to limit growth, and was elected. Reacting to the high cost of campaigning, he had walked the state in his campaign.

As candidate and then governor, Lamm promised for environmental reasons to "drive a silver stake" through plans to build Interstate 470, a proposed circumferential highway around the southwest part of the Denver Metropolitan Area. However, continued development in the area led to increased congestion on surface streets, and the highway was later built, largely with state funds, as State Highway 470.

In 1984, his outspoken statements in support of physician-assisted suicide generated controversy, specifically over his use of the phrase "we have a duty to die." Lamm later explained that he "was essentially raising a general statement about the human condition, not beating up on the elderly," and that the exact phrasing in the speech was "We've got a duty to die and get out of the way with all of our machines and artificial hearts and everything else like that and let the other society, our kids, build a reasonable life." His dire predictions for the future of social security and health care ("duty to die") earned him the nickname "Governor Gloom". His views were satirized by noted folk singer Tom Paxton in January 1985.

Lamm was elected Colorado governor three times. When he left office in 1987 after three terms and twelve years in the office, he was the longest-serving governor in state history (his successor, Roy Romer, matched this record).

=== Later political campaigns ===
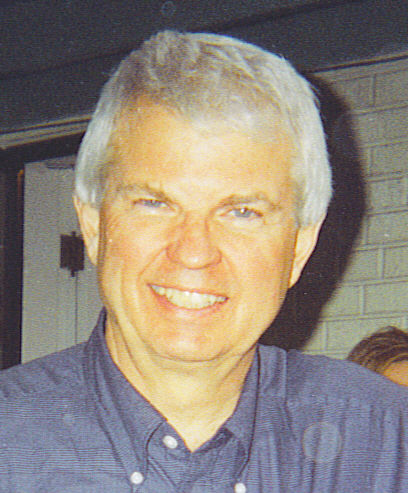
Lamm in 2007

In 1985, he announced he would not seek a fourth term as Governor or a Senate seat.

In 1990, Colorado Democratic state party leaders tried to get Lamm to run for the U.S. Senate seat being vacated by Sen. William L. Armstrong, a Republican, but Lamm declined. In 1992 he ran for the U.S. Senate but suffered his first political defeat. Ben Nighthorse Campbell beat him in the Democratic primary and went on to win the seat. Campbell later switched to the Republican Party.

In 1996 Lamm, while noting that he was still a registered Democrat, criticized both his own Democratic Party and the Republican Party, saying "I think both political parties are controlled by special interest money, and I've had enough of it." and "The Democrats are too close to the trial lawyers and the National Education Association. The Republicans are too close to the radical right." On July 9, 1996, he formally announced his intention to run for the nomination of the Reform Party for the U.S. presidency. Less than 48 hours after Lamm announced his candidacy, Ross Perot, who built the Reform Party from his United We Stand America organization, said he would run as the Reform Party nominee if drafted. In early August, Lamm picked former California Republican congressman Ed Zschau, a high-tech millionaire and proven fund-raiser, to be his running mate on his would-be presidential ticket. Ultimately, however, Perot won 65.2 percent of the 49,266 votes cast by party members nationwide, Lamm winning just 34.8 percent.

== Writer and novelist ==
In 1985, while still in the governor's office, Lamm tried his hand as a novelist. The resulting novel, 1988, is a story about a former Democratic governor of Texas running for U.S. president on a populist, third-party ticket, declaring himself a "progressive conservative." The main character bore a number of similarities to Lamm himself, in his stated political positions, his background as a Democratic governor, as well as presaging Lamm's own unsuccessful run for the Reform Party nomination in 1996. However, the main character in 1988 was also portrayed as a pawn of an international conspiracy to capture the White House.

A voluminous writer, Lamm's other works include Population and the Law (1972), Some Reflections on the Balkanization of America (1978), Megatraumas: America at the Year 2000 (1980), Energy Activities in the West (1980), The Angry West: A Vulnerable Land and Its Future (1982), Campaign for Quality: An Education Agenda for the 80's (1983), Pioneers and Politicians: Ten Colorado Governors in Profile (1984), Copernican Politics (1984), The American West: A poem (1985), Immigration Time Bomb: The Fragmenting of America (1985), The Lamm Administration: A Retrospective (1986), California Conspiracy (1988), Hard Choices (1989), Crisis: The Uncompetitive Society (1989), The fall and Rise of the American Economy (1989), Indicators of Decline: An article from The Futurist (1993), The Supply Factor in Health Care Cost Containment (1993), The Ethics of Excess: An article from The Hastings Center Report (1994), Health Care Workforce Reform.: An article from State Legislatures (1994), The West at Risk (1994), Futurizing America's Institutions.: An article from The Futurist (1996), The price of Modern Medicine (1997), Mountains of Colorado (1999), Government does, indeed, ration health care: An article from State Legislatures (1999), Redrawing the Ethics Map.: An article from The Hastings Center Report (1999), Vision for a Compassionate and Affordable Health System (2001), Brave New World of Health Care (2003), The Brave New World of Health Care (2004), The Challenge of an Aging Society: The Future of U.S. Health Care (2005), Two Wands, One Nation: An Essay on Race and Community in America (2006), Condition Critical: A New Moral Vision of Health Care (2007), and The Brave New World of Health Care Revisited (2013) with Andy Sharma, PhD.

== Activities after political office ==
After leaving office, Lamm continued to speak publicly on environmental issues, mainly population control, immigration reduction, and health care issues.

In 2004 Lamm unsuccessfully ran for a seat on the board of directors of the Sierra Club. He urged that the Sierra Club advocate immigration controls as a way to limit environmental degradation due to population growth.

Lamm served as the chairman of the advisory board of the Federation for American Immigration Reform (FAIR), and on the board of directors of the Diversity Alliance for a Sustainable America (DASA), both anti-immigration groups. He was the co-director of the Institute for Public Policy Studies at the University of Denver.

Lamm also served on the board of directors of American Water Development Inc, along with, Maurice Strong, Samuel Belzberg, Alexander Crutchfield, and William Ruckelshaus, among others. The company spent eight years unsuccessfully attempting to acquire the rights to sell water from an aquifer in the San Luis Valley in Colorado, which they planned to siphon off to suburban areas in Denver, Colorado Springs, and Pueblo.

A 2004 speech by Lamm titled "I Have a Plan to Destroy America," in which he criticizes multiculturalism, became famous the following year after a paraphrased version was widely circulated by email.

In 2006, Lamm drew controversy for a speech he gave discussing the themes of his book, Two Wands, One Nation, arguing that black and Hispanic Americans should embrace "Japanese or Jewish values". The essay was widely criticized by Colorado community groups and leaders of his own party. Lamm later said, "I believe Asian and Jewish culture sends signals that do lead to success, and Hispanic culture doesn't put the same emphasis on a whole list of things like frugality, risk, entrepreneurship, innovation".

== Death ==
On July 29, 2021, Lamm died at a Denver hospital from a pulmonary embolism, 5 days before his 86th birthday.

Party political offices
Preceded by Mark Hogan	Democratic nominee Governor of Colorado; 1974, 1978, 1982	Succeeded by Roy Romer
Political offices
Preceded by John Vanderhoof	Governor of Colorado; 1975–1987	Succeeded by Roy Romer
