= Meatball (disambiguation) =

A meatball is a meat-based food preparation.

Meatball(s) or Meat Ball(s) may also refer to:

== Food ==
- Pork meatball (disambiguation)
- Swedish meatball

== Arts, entertainment, and media ==
- Meatballs (film), 1979 film by Ivan Reitman, starring Bill Murray, and its sequels:
  - Meatballs 2
  - Meatballs III
  - Meatballs 4
- "One Meat Ball", a song by George Martin Lane
- Meatball, a main character in the preschool series 44 Cats
- Meatballs (advertisement), an ad for Pat Buchanan's 2000 United States presidential campaign
- Meatball (drag queen), the drag queen persona of Logan Jennings, in The Boulet Brothers' Dragula

== Insults ==
- Meatball, an idiot
- Meatball, an ethnic slur for an Italian-American

== Military ==
- An optical landing system, as installed on CATOBAR-oriented aircraft carriers
- A derogatory term for the Japanese military aircraft insignia in WWII; see Hinomaru
- Battlefield medicine, or "meatball surgery", treatment of wounded soldiers in or near an area of combat

== Other uses ==
- Meatball (bear), a black bear that repeatedly visited neighborhoods in northern Los Angeles
- Meatball (wrestler), ring name of American professional wrestler Richard Ellinger (born 1970)
- Glossary of baseball terms#meatball, an easy pitch to hit — down the middle of the plate
- EMD AEM-7, an American locomotive nicknamed "Meatball"
- NASA logo, in use prior to 1975 and since 1992
- Flag of Japan, which was described by American forces derogatively as "meatballs"

== See also ==
- MeatballWiki, a wiki dedicated to online culture
- Bait ball
- Metaballs
