= 2000 United States presidential primaries =

The 2000 United States presidential primaries may refer to:

- 2000 Democratic Party presidential primaries
- 2000 Republican Party presidential primaries
- 2000 Reform Party presidential primaries
