= A Republic, Not an Empire =

1999 book by Patrick J. Buchanan

A Republic, Not an Empire: Reclaiming America's Destiny
- Cover
- Author: Patrick J. Buchanan
- Language: English
- Subjects: Intervention (international law), United States--Foreign relations
- Publisher: Regnery Publishing
- Publication date: September 17, 1999
- Publication place: United States
- Media type: Print (Hardcover and Paperback)
- Pages: 437 pp
- ISBN: 0-89526-272-X
- OCLC: 237351752
- Dewey Decimal: 327.73/009 21
- LC Class: E183.7 B83 1999
- Followed by: The Death of the West

A Republic, Not An Empire is a 1999 book by American political figure and presidential candidate Patrick J. Buchanan. The work argues that the United States has become too involved in foreign affairs, and should refrain from interventionism, both military and diplomatic, in favor of focusing on domestic issues. The book, which was published shortly after Buchanan announced his candidacy for the Reform Party's 2000 presidential nomination, was regarded by some as promotion for his presidential run.

== Background ==
In 1999, Buchanan announced his candidacy for president of the United States, with plans to run for the Reform Party's nomination. Shortly thereafter, he published A Republic, Not An Empire, leading some to regard it as campaign literature.

== Summary ==
Central to the book's argument is that the United States should follow the foreign policy philosophy espoused by George Washington, that of noninterventionism and a focus instead on domestic issues. Buchanan continues that in recent years, the US's foreign policy "has become hopelessly overextended". In contrast, he contends that former presidents such as Woodrow Wilson, Franklin Roosevelt, Harry Truman, John F. Kennedy, and Bill Clinton sought "liberal internationalism" in which the United States would be part of worldwide governing bodies. The New York Times disputed this characterization of the presidents' ideology. Buchanan critiques the US's involvement in the North Atlantic Treaty Organization (NATO) and the Treaty of Rio, and questions for instance, in the event that Vietnam should be attacked, "Why should Americans be first to die in any second Korean war?" He also argues that America's trade deficit has enriched countries with interests contrary to those of the United States, citing the example of China's providing Russia with military equipment.

For remedies to the issue, Buchanan proposes that the US remove troops from Japan and South Korea, while continuing to offer them access to weapons and strategic support; that the US scale back its involvement in the United Nations, particularly its Law of the Sea agreement and International Criminal Court; and that US trade agreements be rewritten to favor American businesses. He also outlines several global conflicts which he fears might grow into world wars, such as "a second Balkan war, a second Korean war, a second Gulf war, a China-Taiwan war". Buchanan argues that US involvement in any of these conflicts would be unjustified. He also suggests that all American troops should be removed from Europe. Additionally, he claims that the United States should greatly restrict its immigration, positing that "America will cease to be a First World nation by 2040", a claim which The New York Times characterized as "clearly equating capability with race and national origin".

Buchanan offers commentary on historical events throughout American history. He defends the United States' "tearing away of the Southwest and California from Mexico", deeming criticism of the act "but another lie in the Blame America First series". He argues that many historical advocates of the America First movement were unfairly deemed bigots, and cites passages in which said figures and organizations condemned bigotry. He goes on to criticize American and British involvement in World War II using a series of what the American Prospect and Foreign Affairs both referred to as "what-if" propositions.

== Publication ==
The 437–page book was published by Regnery Publishing on September 17, 1999.

== Reception ==
=== Critical ===
Kirkus Reviews offered the book a mixed assessment, deeming the work to offer a "theoretically coherent analysis but an unnecessarily flawed prescription". The review went on to commend Buchanan's foreign policy philosophy as that of a "true conservative", but questioned his ongoing defense of the Vietnam War, especially in contrast with his belief that the US should have stayed out of World Wars I and II.

The American Prospect critiqued the book for its speculative sections on World War II, arguing that said passages feature "so much what-if thinking that some right-wing university should give him an honorary degree in Ifology". Writing for that publication, critic Ronnie Dugger continued that "His guesswork about what would have happened in military history if what did happen hadn't is truly appalling in its presumption, tendentiousness, and arrogance". Dugger Buchanan's characterized tone as "hypernationalistic".

Writing for The New York Times, John B. Judis called the book "the work of a right-wing crank" and argued that Buchanan's views on foreign policy were more appropriate for the nineteenth century than for the twenty-first. He also accused Buchanan of affording the benefit of the doubt to World War II Germany while assuming the worst about the Soviet Union. Judis ultimately cited the work as evidence that "we may not have learned as much as we should have from the last 100 years".

=== Public ===
Upon its release, the book led to accusations against Buchanan of antisemitism and isolationism. Donald Trump, Thomas Friedman, and George W. Bush all condemned the book.

On September 19, 1999, Buchanan appeared on CBS's Face the Nation to promote the book and his candidacy. Shortly before the broadcast, Trump issued a statement condemning the book and Buchanan's views as "repugnant", "extreme", and "outrageous". While on the television program, Gloria Borger asked Buchanan to respond to the statement; Buchanan argued that Trump was mischaracterizing his views. When questioned about whether he'd read the book, Trump responded that "I’ve seen the phrases we’re dealing with."
