= Pat Buchanan 2000 presidential campaign =

American political campaign

- Campaign: 2000 United States presidential election
- Candidate: Pat Buchanan; White House Director of Communications (1985–1987); Ezola Foster; Political activist
- Affiliation: Republican Party (March—October 1999); Reform Party of the United States (October 1999–November 2000)
- Key people: Bay Buchanan (campaign manager); Pat Choate (campaign co-chair); Lenora Fulani (campaign co-chair)
- Slogan: America First!

Website
- Buchanan for President (archived October 19, 2000)

The 2000 presidential campaign of Pat Buchanan, conservative pundit and advisor to both President Richard Nixon and Ronald Reagan, was formally launched on March 2, 1999, as Buchanan announced his intention to seek the Republican Party nomination for the presidency of the United States in the 2000 presidential election. It marked Buchanan's third primary campaign for the presidency, following his bids in 1992 and 1996. Although he had not attained the nomination either time, he had been regarded as a consequential party figure. Early primary surveys found Buchanan polling in the single digits and following the publication of his book A Republic, Not an Empire, which generally advocated for noninterventionist and "America first" foreign policy, some within the Republican Party condemned Buchanan's foreign policy views. There began to be speculation that Buchanan would leave the Republican Party in favor of the Reform Party, a third party qualified for matching federal campaign funds.

On October 25, 1999, Buchanan formally announced that he was departing the GOP and would instead seek the Reform nomination. In the primary campaign, he briefly faced as an opponent future president Donald Trump; however, in February 2000, Trump ended his campaign and left the party, objecting to its extremist elements and questioning whether the party could win. The other serious contender for the nomination was Natural Law Party politician and physicist John Hagelin, who campaigned on a continuation of Perot's approach and allegedly planned to combine the Reform and Natural Law parties. Buchanan won the national mail-in primary by a wide margin, but Hagelin supporters contended that some of the ballots were fraudulently cast and filed multiple complaints with the FEC. Hagelin supporters ultimately hosted an alternative convention concurrent with the official Reform Party. Buchanan secured the Reform Party nomination at the August 2000 convention, and selected educator and conservative activist Ezola B. Foster as his running-mate.

A number of lawsuits arose from the campaign and the transfer of power within the national party. In February, party officials voted to remove party chair Jack Gargan, a Buchanan critic, and to replace him with Buchanan's campaign chair, economist and Perot's 1996 running mate Pat Choate. Gargan filed a suit alleging that the meeting at which officials cast their votes was illegally convened, but a judge ruled that Choate was the rightful chair. Concurrently, the chair of the New Hampshire Reform Party threatened legal action against Buchanan's campaign for misleading mailers sent to Reform voters within the state, and Buchanan filed a suit against the Federal Election Commission (FEC) after the body declined to act on a petition to be included in the nationally televised presidential debates. A federal judge ruled in favor of the FEC. Another suit, filed by Hagelin, alleged that he was the rightful nominee, and thus entitled to the matching federal campaign funds; the funds were, following a legal battle, awarded to the Buchanan campaign.

Buchanan launched his general election campaign on September 18 with a rally at Bob Jones University. He ran on an anti-NAFTA, pro-life, anti-war, non-interventionist platform similar to that of his two previous presidential campaigns. In the general election, the campaign attracted attention with a series of television commercials which dealt with issues such as immigration, gay rights, and campaign finance, and drew some criticism for the support which it attracted from the far right. The Buchanan-Foster ticket went on to win 449,895 votes in the November election, the fourth-highest total. The ticket was also speculated to indirectly have influenced the result of the election, due to the design of a Palm Beach, Florida, ballot which led many Gore supporters to accidentally cast a vote for Buchanan. The Bush campaign contended that Palm Beach County was a Reform Party "stronghold", but Buchanan and his Florida campaign staff disputed that characterization. Following the election, Buchanan briefly maintained ties with the party, but formally left it shortly thereafter and became a political independent.

== Primary campaign ==
=== Republican candidacy ===
Initial Buchanan campaign logo

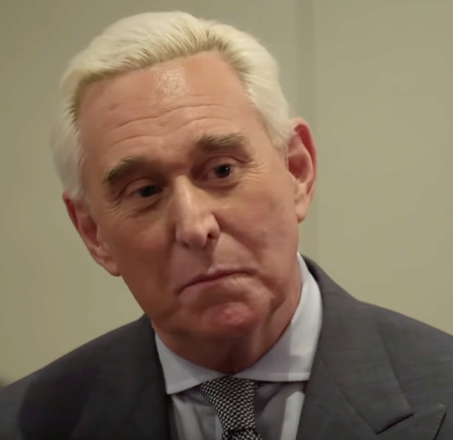
Republican consultant Roger Stone first suggested that Buchanan leave the Republican Party to seek the Reform nomination.

In 1992, Pat Buchanan mounted his first presidential campaign, challenging incumbent president George H. W. Bush for the Republican nomination. Buchanan campaigned as a more—conservative alternative to Bush, and although he did not win any primary contests, he received 37 percent of the vote in the New Hampshire primary and ultimately received a speaking slot at the 1992 Republican National Convention, where he delivered his famous "culture wars" speech. His surprisingly strong showing in the primary was regarded as foreshadowing Bush's electoral troubles which would culminate in his losing the general election to Bill Clinton. In 1996, Buchanan again sought the Republican presidential nomination, in total receiving 21 percent of the primary vote and winning four contests (in addition to placing a close second in the Iowa caucuses), but losing the nomination to Bob Dole.

In February 1999, Buchanan took leave from Crossfire, the CNN program which he had long co-hosted. The New York Times reported that an announcement of his third presidential campaign was imminent. The following week, on March 6, 1999, Buchanan announced his candidacy for the Republican presidential nomination. A former campaign advisor predicted that economic issues, such as dislocation, would be his top campaign issue, since economic issues had been central to his previous campaigns and he believed no other candidate was discussing them. He soon thereafter hosted a rally in Weirton, West Virginia.

Early polling showed Buchanan in the single digits in both Iowa and New Hampshire. His campaign did not receive the same level of attention as his previous bids, and in August 1999, he placed fifth in the Iowa Straw Poll behind George W. Bush, Steve Forbes, Elizabeth Dole, and Gary Bauer. This was regarded as a disappointing finish. As the year progressed, there began to be speculation that Buchanan, because tensions with the Republican Party, might defect from the party and instead seek the nomination of Ross Perot's Reform Party, which thanks to its 1996 showing qualified for $13,000,000 in matching federal campaign funds and guaranteed ballot access in a number of states. At a June 1999 luncheon in Washington, former presidential advisor Roger Stone first suggested to Bay Buchanan, Pat's sister and campaign manager, that her brother consider running for the Reform nomination. Roger was running a consultancy at the time and tasked one of his employees, William von Raab, with exploring the possibility of Reform supporting Buchanan.

=== Early Reform Party primary campaign ===
==== Departure from the Republican Party ====
External videos
- Buchanan candidacy announcement, October 25, 1999, C-SPAN

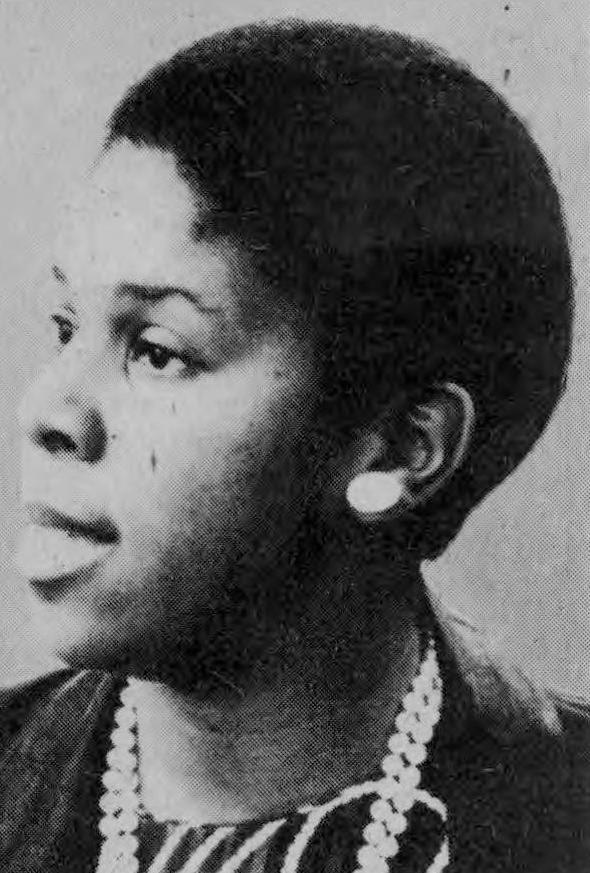
Left-wing activist and two-time presidential candidate Lenora Fulani became an advisor to Buchanan's campaign shortly after his departure from the Republican Party.

On October 25, 1999, Buchanan announced at a Falls Church, Virginia, news conference attended by approximately 350 supporters that he was formally departing the Republican Party in favor of the Reform Party, and would continue seeking the presidency under the latter party. He contended that the Democratic and Republican Parties "have become nothing but two wings of the same bird of prey," pointing to what he characterized as their similar positions on issues such as international trade and "soft money" in campaign finance. In the speech, he also called for America to pursue a less-interventionist foreign policy. He addressed accusations that he supported isolationism by saying that "if they mean I intend to isolate America from the bloody territorial and ethnic wars of the new century, I plead guilty." Buchanan also acknowledged the need to improve his relationship with minority voters, as the Reform Party's base was far more racially diverse than the supporters of his two previous presidential runs. His office began consulting with Lenora Fulani, an African-American socialist and Reform Party official. In November 1999, she became an advisor to his campaign, eventually serving as its co-chair.

Republican officials generally expressed satisfaction at Buchanan's break from the GOP. Senator John McCain, at the time competing for the Republican presidential nomination, announced that "I do not mourn his departure" and criticized Bush for not being more critical of Buchanan. Shortly following Buchanan's announcement of his Reform candidacy, a CNN/USA Today/Gallup poll asked voters whether they would vote for Buchanan as the Reform nominee. Two-thirds of respondents said that they would "definitely not" vote for him, while one-quarter said they "would consider voting for him", and four percent said they would definitely vote for him. Among Republican voters, only four percent named him their first choice, compared to sixty-six percent for eventual nominee George W. Bush. Another Gallup poll shortly after Buchanan's announcement showed him at five percent in a general-election matchup with Bush and Gore, with Bush leading by eight points among registered voters.

==== Book controversy ====
In September 1999, the month before Buchanan announced his Reform Party candidacy, he published a book titled A Republic, Not an Empire, via Regnery Publishing. The book was regarded by some as a work of campaign literature. The work contended that the United States should withdraw from or scale back involvement in international diplomatic and trade bodies, and also contended that the United States' involvement in many military conflicts — including both world wars — was ill-advised. This led to accusations of bigotry, including by Reform Party figures. During the primary election campaign, Donald Trump would refer to the book when accusing Buchanan of intolerance.

==== Advisors and supporters ====
Endorsements
- Virginia Abernethy, anthropologist, journalist, member of the Council of Conservative Citizens
- Pat Choate, economist and 1996 Reform Party vice presidential candidate
- Frederick B. Dent, 21st United States Secretary of Commerce (1973–1975), 5th United States Trade Representative (1975–1977)
- Lenora Fulani, psychologist and 1988 and 1992 New Alliance Party presidential candidate (revoked in June 2000)
- Brian Moore, 2008 Socialist Party presidential candidate
- The Spotlight, weekly Washington, DC newspaper
- William White Williams, member of the National Alliance (United States)

Buchanan's campaign structure was noted for its lack of a formal advisory committee. His sister and former Reagan Treasurer of the United States Bay Buchanan served as his campaign manager. Reform Party official and two-time presidential candidate Lenora Fulani, who identified as a Marxist–Leninist, endorsed Buchanan's primary candidacy and, in November, became co-chair of his campaign, a move which some interpreted as an effort by Buchanan to expand his base of support to include more traditionally left-leaning voters, such as African-Americans and gays, who had backed Fulani's campaigns. However, this pairing was regarded as unexpected by some, given their different views on many issues, and a report by the Center for Public Integrity accused Buchanan's choice of campaign officials as politically opportunistic and ideologically hypocritical, since he espoused conservative views which were often at odds with Fulani's. Another top advisor to the campaign was Scott McConnell, a controversial former New York Post columnist.

Buchanan's candidacy also attracted the support of far-right activists, some of whom began assuming positions of power within the Reform Party, such as chairs of state chapters; the Southern Poverty Law Center argued that the ideological makeup of the party under Buchanan was similar to that of the far-right French party National Front, then headed by Jean Marie Le Pen. This ideological shift alienated some longtime Reform Party members, who began departing the party, leaving behind what the Southern Poverty Law Center deemed a "leaner and much meaner Reform Party".

=== Late Reform Party primary campaign ===
==== Lawsuits ====
At a February 2000 Reform Party meeting in Nashville, Tennessee, party officials moved, in a vote of 109 to 31, to remove party chairman Jack Gargan. In another vote, the officials voted by a margin of 101 to 29 to replace Gargan with economist Pat Choate, the party's 1996 vice presidential nominee as well as the chair of Buchanan's campaign committee; Choate resigned from the campaign position upon his election to serve as the interim chair, with a vote on a new chairman slated to take place at the August convention. The conflict and infighting within the party were regarded by some as creating an opening for Republican presidential primary candidate John McCain, whose message on campaign finance reform was similar to that of the Reform Party.

In response to the removal vote, Gargan, a Buchanan critic whose chairmanship had been supported by Minnesota governor Jesse Ventura, argued the meeting had been called illegally and his removal was unofficial; he filed a lawsuit to retain the chairmanship, and to keep party treasurer Ronn Young, who had also been removed by a vote, in his respective position. On March 27, 2000, District Judge Norman K. Moon ruled that the meeting had been convened legally and that Choate was the legitimate chairman, also ordering Choate and Young to cease their involvement in party operations such as collecting donations, spending funds, and planning the upcoming presidential nominating convention.

Concurrently, several other lawsuits were being threatened or heard against the party and its candidates. The chair of the New Hampshire Reform Party threatened to file a $10 million suit against the Buchanan campaign, alleging that the candidate had illegally used the party's name on campaign mailers. A pamphlet mailed to party members around the state invited them to an April 1 state party convention where they would elect delegates to the national nominating convention; however, no such event had been planned by the party, leading to accusations that the campaign was attempting to secretly select delegates.

During the same period, Buchanan and Choate publicly considered a suit to qualify for inclusion in the general election debates. In March, Buchanan filed a petition with the FEC, arguing that the Commission on Presidential Debates' 15 percent polling threshold for debate qualification effectively disqualified third-party candidates from appearance in the debates. After the commission's 120-day window to take action on the petition had passed, Buchanan filed suit against the FEC. In September, a federal district judge ruled that the 15 percent threshold "was reasonable and objective".

==== Departure of Reform figures ====
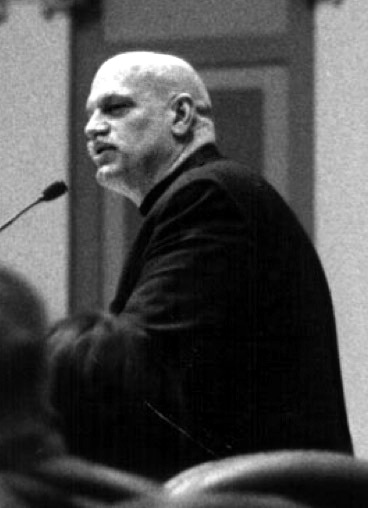
Minnesota governor Jesse Ventura, a member of the Reform Party, was critical of Buchanan and left the party in response to his candidacy.

In response to Buchanan's rise within the party, several prominent members departed the Reform Party. In a February 2000 letter, Minnesota governor Jesse Ventura, who had two years earlier become the first Reform candidate elected governor in America, announced that he was leaving the party and would seek to change the Reform Party of Minnesota to the Independence Party. Ventura elaborated in the letter that Buchanan's expected presidential nomination was one reason for his decision, calling Buchanan "an anti-abortion extremist and unrealistic isolationist" who did not align with the party's centrist values. Another figure who left the party in February 2000 was future Republican president Donald Trump, who had briefly run for the Reform nomination himself. Trump had frequently attacked Buchanan as a bigot, and on February 14, 2000, Trump dropped out of the race, objecting to its extremist elements, pointing to its ties to Buchanan, Fulani, and David Duke, and remarking that "this is not the company I wish to keep".

In June 2000, Fulani resigned as campaign co-chair, citing Buchanan's emphasis on social conservatism, his failure to reach out to independents and left-leaning voters, and his decision not to support her bid for party chair. Fulani emphasized she would remain a member of the Reform Party. Buchanan and his sister responded that they had welcomed supporters from across the political spectrum and speculated that Fulani's decision to leave was based on his decision not to support her bid for party chair. In an open letter, Buchanan said he had decided against supporting Fulani "not because you lack the talent or ability", but because he questioned whether she could unify the party. Fulani declined to say whether she would endorse Hagelin, and Hagelin did not immediately back Fulani for party chair. However, he said that "Lenora is really dedicated to grass-roots democracy and she more or less already assured me that she would never let Buchanan overthrow the public plebiscite. So in a sense -- the most important sense -- I feel I've already had Fulani's support" and indicated that he was open to the possibility of backing her bid for party chair.

==== Union support ====
Buchanan sought the support of labor unions, particularly the Teamsters. On April 12, 2000, Buchanan announced that, if elected, he would appoint Teamsters president James P. Hoffa to a cabinet post and oppose efforts to normalize trade with China. He spoke at a Teamsters rally alongside independent Vermont congressman Bernie Sanders and Democratic Michigan congressman David Bonior, arguing that his position was one which united Americans and involved family values.

==== Primary elections ====
Buchanan received a majority of the vote in 47 of the 50 states’ primaries. Blue states backed Buchanan; orange backed Hagelin.

Buchanan ultimately faced only one opponent on the Reform Party primary ballot: Michigan physicist John Hagelin, a member of the Natural Law Party. Hagelin was regarded as the party's "rank and file" candidate.

For a time, there was some question of whether Perot might make a third bid for the presidency, particularly in light of reporting that Perot was not in favor of Buchanan's candidacy; on June 30, he announced that he would not be running. Reportedly at the urging of Perot, the Party considered including a "No Endorsement" ballot line to allow party members to show their disapproval of both candidates. Perot indicated that he would be willing to be the party's nominee if "No Endorsement" prevailed in the primary. However, the party ultimately decided against offering a "No Endorsement" option. Trump dropped out of the race on February 14, the same day he left the party. Other figures who were rumored to consider a bid for the Reform nomination included actress Cybill Shepherd, actor Warren Beatty, Governor Ventura, and former Connecticut governor Lowell Weicker, although none ultimately ran.

The presidential primary was conducted via mail-in ballots, with few restrictions placed on who could request a ballot. As a result of the primary process, the outcome was regarded as unpredictable. Buchanan received a majority of the vote in every state except Colorado, Hawaii, and North Carolina, with a combined vote total of 49,529, compared to 28,539 for Hagelin. As a result, Buchanan received the entire slate of allotted delegates in most states.

== Party convention ==
=== Nomination ===
The Reform Party National Convention was held in Long Beach, California from August 10 to 13 to officially nominate the Reform Party's 2000 presidential candidate. Two blocks away from the official convention, anti-Buchanan Reform Party members held an alternative convention, contending that the mail-in ballots which showed Buchanan winning were fraudulent, and opting to instead nominate Hagelin by acclamation. Hagelin's speech was attended by approximately 1,000 supporters.

At the "Buchanan-dominated convention", Buchanan was easily declared the victor in the mail-in primary, with 49,529 ballots cast for him compared to 28,539 for Hagelin. However, party officials decided not to use the primary vote totals as the rationale for their nomination of Buchanan, for fear that Hagelin supporters would continue to contend that the primary had been fraudulently conducted and that they might mount a legal challenge which would delay the party's receipt of the $13 million in matching federal campaign funds they were guaranteed. Regardless, prior to the convention, Hagelin supporters filed a Federal Election Commission complaint alleging fraud in the primary process and protesting Buchanan's expected receipt of the matching funds.

In his acceptance speech, Buchanan proclaimed that "Neither Beltway party will drain this political swamp, because to them it is not a swamp; it is a protected wetland, their natural habitat"; the phrase "the swamp" was first used by Ronald Reagan in 1983, and it was later revived by Donald Trump during his 2016 presidential campaign.

=== Running mate ===
Early in Buchanan's candidacy, it was reported that he was considering James P. Hoffa, the head of the Teamsters, for his running-mate; however, the union declined to endorse Buchanan's campaign, and Hoffa indicated that he had no interest in entering politics. He was also speculated to have invited Republican activist Alan Keyes and Democratic Ohio congressman Jim Traficant to be his running-mate, but both turned down his offers as well. He was reported to have been rebuffed by up to eight possible running-mates.

Buchanan ultimately selected African-American conservative activist Ezola Foster as his running-mate. Foster had spent 33 years as a school teacher and administrator, and had identified as a Democrat in the 1960s before joining the Republican Party; she eventually left the latter because she felt it was insufficiently conservative. During her time as an educator and activist, Foster sought elected office, twice challenging then-California assembly member Maxine Waters but losing both times. She had also been a vocal proponent of Proposition 187, a 1984 ballot measure in California which aimed to deny aid to undocumented immigrants, and in 1996 co-chaired Buchanan's second presidential campaign. Additionally, Foster was a traveling speaker for the John Birch Society and founded a conservative advocacy organization called "Black-Americans for Family Values" which, among other causes, objected to references to homosexuality in public school curriculum and defended the display of Confederate flags in the South. In 1995, she had hosted a dinner in honor of one of the police officers involved in the beating of Rodney King.

Foster's views were considered, including by Foster herself, to be closely aligned with Buchanan's. During the campaign, she was noted for her positions on education-related issues, criticizing free school lunches for low-income students as being socialistic, and arguing that Ritalin and other hyperactivity drugs are overprescribed for children. She was also noted as a critic of the Reverend Jesse Jackson, having accused him of being a "Leninist race-baiter" and attacking his use of slogans such as "One Voice! One People! One Vote!", which Foster considered similar to the slogans of Adolf Hitler; Jackson called her "the worst thing that ever happened to the black community."

Reform Party officials were publicly complimentary towards the selection of Foster, commending the symbolism of a racially diverse ticket and noting that her background in education qualified her to discuss an issue important to many voters. However, some party officials also said they wished Buchanan would have picked a nationally recognized running-mate. The decision alienated many white supremacists who, much to the chagrin of Reform Party members, had originally supported Buchanan's bid for the presidency.

=== Disputed nominee ===
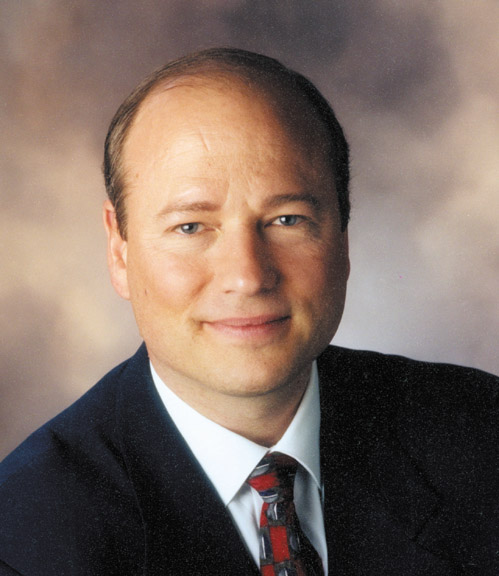
John Hagelin, a Michigan physicist and activist, contended that he was the rightful presidential nominee of the Reform Party.

Following the disputed convention, Hagelin argued that he was the legitimate Reform Party presidential nominee and that, as such, his campaign was entitled to the $12.6 million in matching federal campaign funds (for which the party had qualified with Perot's showing in the 1996 election). The Buchanan campaign contended in an August 2 e-mail to supporters that Hagelin was planning to put forward a proposal to merge the Reform and Natural Law parties. They also alleged that Hagelin's campaign had been given access to the Reform Party voter rolls so that they could send out anti-Buchanan mailers promoting Hagelin's Natural Law Party candidacy.

On September 12, the FEC held a public hearing, and later that day, they voted 5–1 to award the funds to Buchanan's campaign. Hagelin stated that he would not appeal the decision, thereby guaranteeing that Buchanan would receive the funds. Two days later, on September 14, the FEC made its decision official, and the Buchanan campaign later that day began airing radio ads in South Carolina and Michigan. On September 13, a judge ruled that Hagelin was not the legitimate Reform Party nominee, and that he and his supporters must stop using the party name in their campaign efforts; Hagelin stated that he would comply with the order.

== General election ==
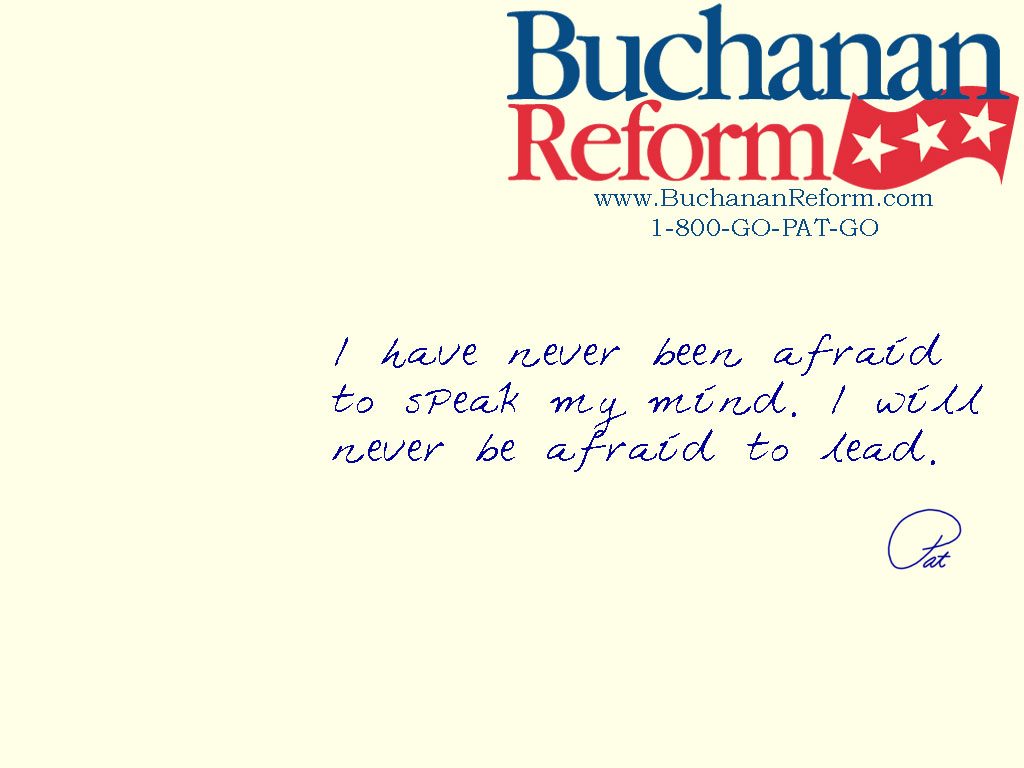
Computer wallpaper promoting Buchanan's presidential campaign

=== Kickoff ===
Buchanan's general election campaign began on September 18, with an appearance at Bob Jones University in Greenville, South Carolina; the campaign promoted the upcoming event with radio spots emphasizing Buchanan's positions on abortion and school prayer. The choice of venue for the kickoff was considered significant because earlier in the year, Republican nominee Bush had declined to condemn the school's controversial policies—including a ban on interracial dating which had lasted until that year—and was criticized by some. The university president argued that Buchanan's decision to launch his campaign at the school supported his belief that "the press had it all wrong when they vilified George Bush for coming here."

The launch event drew approximately 1,700 attendees. Buchanan was introduced by university president Bob Jones III, who praised Buchanan for "car(ing) more for truth than for his own image". Jones later clarified that he was not formally endorsing Buchanan's candidacy, and that rather, "I endorse him as a friend." During his speech, Buchanan highlighted a number of his campaign positions, including imposing judicial term limits, pursuing antitrust action against entertainment companies like Disney, and withdrawing from the United Nations and forcing them to relocate their headquarters out of New York.

=== Campaign ads ===
Buchanan ran a series of television spots which sometimes attracted controversy, with some accusing the commercials of xenophobia or racism. For ad creation and media buying, the Buchanan campaign employed Love Advertising, a Houston-based ad agency. One ad, titled Meatballs, depicted a man who chokes on a meatball after a news anchor announced that the new president had signed an order establishing that English not to be country's official language; the man attempted to call 911 for help, but collapsed from suffocation before the language menu reached English. Upon its release, the ad was condemned by the chair of the California Democratic Party, a Latino nonprofit advocacy official, and multiple advertising critics.

Other ads the campaign aired during the general election were tailored to local concerns. The "Meatballs" ad aired in markets with many immigrant workers, especially in California and Arizona, and parts of Iowa and Maryland. In Vermont, the campaign aired an ad titled "Culture War", in which Buchanan criticized the idea of having openly gay Boy Scout leaders; the spot was considered particularly relevant to the state since they had recently legalized same-sex civil unions. The final ad of the campaign, titled "Auction", depicted both Gore and Bush as items up for auction to the highest bidder, including a Buddhist monk, a Chinese Red Army general, a Hollywood couple, a Texas oilman, and a pharmaceutical lobbyist. At the end of the ad, Buchanan addresses viewers by saying that "The two parties are bought and paid for. We are not. This Election Day, help us build a third party that puts Americans first". It marked Buchanan's first in-person appearance of the election cycle in a campaign ad. David Harrison, the creative director for the advertising campaign, commented to UPI that "Nobody ever responds to it by saying, 'I disagree with that. Bush and Gore are not for sale.' And what that says about the American political system is a little spooky."

Between his receipt of the Reform nomination and October 18, over half of the campaign funds spent by the Buchanan campaign went to ads. According to FEC filings, his campaign spent $5.5 million on advertising between October 1 and October 18. Love Advertising booked the TV spots to air during comedy programs such as The Simpsons, The Drew Carey Show, and WWE SmackDown, as well as local news shows in 31 states.

=== Late campaign developments ===
On November 2, 2000, Perot appeared on Larry King Live to announce that he was endorsing George W. Bush over Buchanan for president.

== Political positions ==
=== Economic issues ===
==== Healthcare ====
Buchanan was critical of government involvement in healthcare. He opposed the creation of a national health care system, and backed proposals to replace Medicare with a self-financed savings system. He supported calls to abolish euthanasia, accusing it of fostering a "culture of death" and linking it to the issue of abortion.

==== Tax policy ====
In July 1999, Buchanan put forward a proposal for a "Small Business Bill of Rights" which would eliminate all federal taxation on small businesses' profits, and instead implement a four percent tax on small business profits over $1 million (~$1.81 million in 2025). He also proposed abolishing the inheritance tax and implementing a 50 percent cut to capital gains taxes. He voiced support for a one- or two-dollar increase in the federal minimum wage if the increase was linked to a decrease in taxes on small businesses, to help offset the additional expense.

==== Trade ====
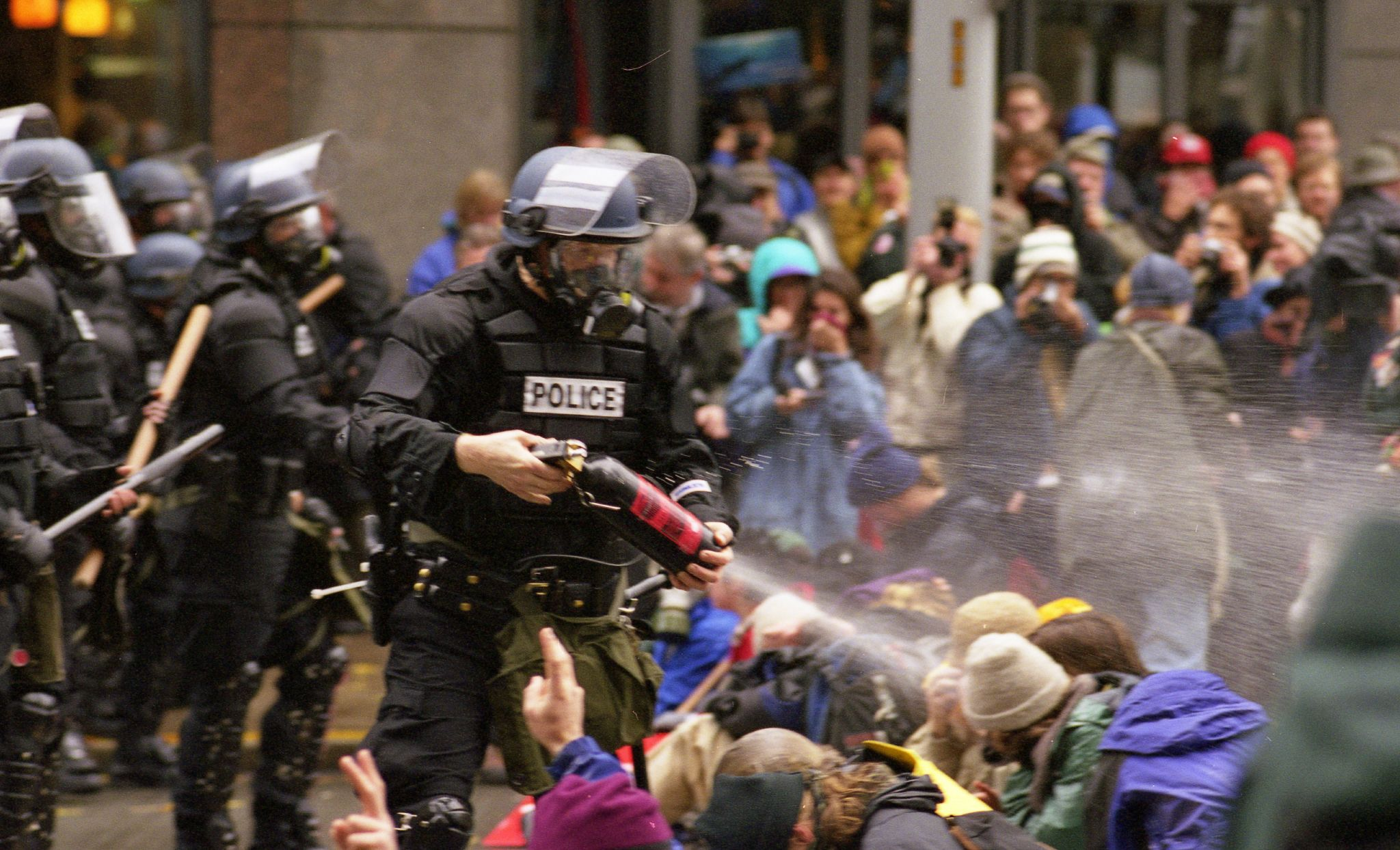
Buchanan called the World Trade Organization an "embryonic monster" and expressed his support for protestors at the 1999 Seattle WTO protests.

As in his two previous runs, Buchanan made his opposition to free trade agreements a central issue to his campaign. In A Republic, Not an Empire, Buchanan argues that the United States should lessen its dependence on trade. This stance aligned him with that of labor unions; Hoffa, while declining to formally endorse Buchanan, commended his position on trade agreements. In November 1999, Buchanan voiced support for the World Trade Organization protests in Seattle, and himself opposed the WTO by arguing that it was an "embryonic monster" that threatened national sovereignty, enabled human rights abuses, and lessened Americans' job security. His position aligned him with environmental organizations. He also suggested that his views on trade had won him support among some minority communities, stating in an NPR interview that "These manufacturing jobs in America that I'm trying to save aren't for Pat Buchanan. They're not for people in graduate schools. They're the road to the middle class for kids who quit school after high school maybe because they got into a little bit of trouble, or maybe because they want to, or they're tired of school." His opposition to free trade was in line with the views he expressed during his prior campaigns: in 1996, he had referred to corporations as "amoral behemoths" concerned only with their "bottom line", and added that "if they shut down factories here to open overseas, they will pay a price for the readmission of their goods into America's market."

Buchanan also voiced opposition to normalizing trade relations with China, arguing that their human rights abuses should disqualify them from privileged status, and suggesting that unions would be harmed by increased trade. His stance was likened to that of Bernie Sanders, then a congressman from Vermont; at a Teamsters rally in April 2000, Buchanan announced that he would tell Chinese trade negotiators that "You stop persecuting Christians, you stop threatening my country, or you guys have sold your last pair of chopsticks in any mall in the United States". His views differed from those of trade unions on some other issues, however: he opposed large increases to the minimum wage or the implementation of a universal health care program.

=== Foreign policy ===
==== Foreign aid ====
Buchanan proposed that the International Monetary Fund and World Bank should reimburse the United States for the latter's foreign aid loans which had not been repaid, referring to the two institutions as "globalist institutions who deceived us when they said the loans were good".

==== Military intervention ====
Another issue central to Buchanan's campaign was his opposition to military interventionism in almost all circumstances; this stance was the focus of A Republic, Not an Empire, and elicited criticism from Trump, McCain, and others within the Republican and Reform parties. In A Republic, Buchanan posits that, in the event that "a second Balkan war, a second Korean war, a second Gulf war, (or) a China-Taiwan war" should arise, United States intervention would be unjustified under any circumstances, asking "Why should Americans be first to die in any second Korean war?" Buchanan also argued that the United States should not have been involved in either World War, but defended the nation's involvement in the Vietnam War, during which time he had been serving in the Nixon administration.

=== Social issues ===
==== Abortion ====
Buchanan referred to abortion as "the greatest evil since slavery", and a radio ad for his campaign stated that "if you want to vote pro-life, your candidate is Pat Buchanan, not George W. Bush". He stated that he would select a pro-life running mate, would have an abortion litmus test for Supreme Court nominees, and would advocate for a Human Life Amendment to the US Constitution. Buchanan was also opposed to the marketing of RU-486, and criticized the Food and Drug Administration for approving it. After the FDA approval on September 28, Buchanan issued a press release saying that "Today, our government certified the culture of death in an easy to swallow tablet". In his October Meet the Press appearance, Buchanan referred to the drug as "a human pesticide" and stated that he would oppose its being placed on the market, including by way of appointments to the FDA.

==== Culture ====
Buchanan posited that increases in youth crime were attributable to cultural factors more than ones related to firearm access or economic circumstances. He voiced support for abolishing the National Endowment for the Arts.

==== Civil rights ====
===== Gay rights =====
The Advocate reflected that Buchanan "made opposition to gay rights central to his platform". In May 2000, he stated in an NPR interview with Talk of the Nation that "I oppose the gay rights agenda in its entirety". In that interview, he also stated that although all Americans are entitled to equal rights, "All lifestyles are not equal. All ideas are not equal. Some are wrong; some are right [...] I do not believe their (gay rights activists') ideas are equal to mine, or that lifestyle is equal to a traditional married lifestyle. And we've gotta stand up for truth even when it's unpopular and even when it's painful." He called civil unions for same-sex couples "absurd" during an October Meet the Press appearance. In September 2000, he referred to homosexuality as "the love that will not shut up", and contended that acceptance of gay people would lead to "social decadence and national decline". He also opposed permitting openly gay troops to serve in the military, stated that he would not select any openly gay officials to serve in his cabinet, and said that he "would not be comfortable" with the United States electing an openly gay president. However, Buchanan was also quoted by the Associated Press in May saying that he doesn't "believe in persecuting anybody" over their sexual orientation, and added that gays who lead "a good life" deserve acceptance.

===== Racial equity =====
In July 1999 on his campaign website, Buchanan voiced opposition to "reverse discrimination", including busing, quotas, and affirmative action. In his May 2000 NPR interview, Buchanan reflected on his comments from the 1960s in which he called Martin Luther King Jr. a "divisive" figure; Buchanan commented that "Like every great movement, the civil rights movement had things that were attractive and things that were not", and contended that he was the only presidential candidate who attended the March on Washington. Buchanan argued that affirmative action is "government-sponsored prejudice" and that it "belongs in the same graveyard as Jim Crow". He also announced that, if elected, he would pursue "color-blind" anti-discrimination laws which state that "no discrimination means no discrimination". During a January 24, 2000, appearance on CNN, Buchanan argued that racism exists "right there in the human heart" and that "that's a problem that can't be dealt with simply by political leaders. [...] We've got to change the human heart."

==== Drug policy ====
On the issue of marijuana legalization, Buchanan argued in favor of continuing the war on drugs and posited that marijuana use was responsible for some birth defects and lasting damage to children. During his January 24 appearance on CNN, he stated that "I'm against the legalization of marijuana". He also argued that the drug trade was one reason to restrict the border between the United States and Mexico, pointing to drug cartels and arguing that the North American Free Trade Agreement had made it easier for drugs to cross the southern border.

==== Education ====
Buchanan supported abolishing the Department of Education. He expressed support for homeschooling, charter schools, and magnet schools as alternatives to public schools, but added that "we can't give up on public schools either". He advocated for religious and values instruction in public schools, as well as the inclusion of Christmas-related programming. He also argued that the federal government should play less of a role in local school districts, opposing national testing or standards "as intrusions on the rights of parents and the primacy of local communities"; he also opposed government involvement in homeschooling. He proposed that federal education funds be delivered to the states in the form of block grants, with instruction to governors that individual communities have oversight of the funds' disbursal. Buchanan differed from Foster on the issue of subsidized school lunches for low-income students; while she argued that they were unnecessary and socialistic, he voiced support for maintaining the program.

==== Gun control ====
Buchanan stated on his campaign website that "The Second Amendment guarantees the individual right to own, possess, and use personal firearms, and as President I will ensure that this right is not compromised," although voicing support for barring felons from possessing guns. In June 1999, in response to the Columbine school shooting, Buchanan argued that additional gun control legislation was "not the answer", noting that the two students had violated 19 laws and that enforcement and stopping "urban barbarism" was the solution to preventing gun violence.

==== Immigration ====
Buchanan supported cutting the number of legal immigrants to America to between 250,000 and 300,000 annually, and stringently guarding the southern border; he expressed openness to sending troops to the border, doubling the number of border patrol agents, building a "Buchanan fence" to keep "our borders under control". Buchanan also supported making English the national language, and requiring all immigrants to learn it; this issue was the subject of his controversial "Meatballs" campaign ad. He also suggested that the government should implement "a national campaign of assimilation to teach newly adopted Americans our culture, history, traditions, and English language".

== Outcome ==
=== Results ===
Vote percentage received by Pat Buchanan in the 2000 US presidential election by state or territory

In the 2000 presidential election, Buchanan finished fourth with 449,895 votes, 0.4% of the popular vote. Hagelin garnered 0.1 percent as the Natural Law candidate. In exit polls conducted by the Roper Center for Public Opinion Research at Cornell University, Buchanan did not receive more than one percentage point of support from any demographic, but did receive one percent in some polls from women; Hispanic and Asian voters; voters between the ages of 25 and 29 and between 50 and 64; union households; each income bracket of voters below $75,000 a year; Democrats and Independents; and voters in the Midwest and South.

The Buchanan-Foster ticket received more than two percent of the vote in one state: North Dakota, where they received 2.53 percent of the vote. Of the ten United States counties where Buchanan received his highest percentage of the vote, nine were located in North Dakota, and one (Pottawatomie) was located in Kansas. The county from which Buchanan drew the greatest number of raw votes was Los Angeles County, in California, where he received 11,526 votes; in that county and one other (Arizona's Maricopa), the ticket drew over 5,000 votes.

Results
State	Vote percentage	Votes	Result	Reference
North Dakota	2.53 / 100	7,288	Lost	
Alaska	1.82 / 100	5,192	Lost	
Idaho	1.52 / 100	7,615	Lost	
Montana	1.39 / 100	5,697	Lost	
Wyoming	1.25 / 100	2,724	Lost	
Utah	1.21 / 100	9,319	Lost	
South Dakota	1.05 / 100	3,322	Lost	
Minnesota	0.91 / 100	22,166	Lost	
Arizona	0.81 / 100	12,373	Lost	
Louisiana	0.81 / 100	14,356	Lost	
Arkansas	0.80 / 100	7,358	Lost	
Nevada	0.78 / 100	4,747	Lost	
Indiana	0.77 / 100	16,959	Lost	
Vermont	0.74 / 100	2,192	Lost	
Oklahoma	0.73 / 100	9,014	Lost	
Kansas	0.69 / 100	7,370	Lost	
Maine	0.68 / 100	4,443	Lost	
Colorado	0.60 / 100	10,465	Lost	
Ohio	0.57 / 100	26,724	Lost	
Rhode Island	0.56 / 100	2,273	Lost	
Nebraska	0.52 / 100	3,646	Lost	
West Virginia	0.49 / 100	3,169	Lost	
New Hampshire	0.46 / 100	2,615	Lost	
New York	0.46 / 100	31,599	Lost	
Oregon	0.46 / 100	7,063	Lost	
Iowa	0.44 / 100	5,731	Lost	
Wisconsin	0.44 / 100	11,471	Lost	
Georgia	0.42 / 100	10,926	Lost	
Missouri	0.42 / 100	9,818	Lost	
California	0.41 / 100	44,987	Lost	
Massachusetts	0.41 / 100	11,149	Lost	
Alabama	0.38 / 100	6,351	Lost	
Illinois	0.34 / 100	16,106	Lost	
Pennsylvania	0.34 / 100	16,023	Lost	
Connecticut	0.32 / 100	4,731	Lost	
North Carolina	0.30 / 100	8,874	Lost	
Florida	0.29 / 100	17,484	Lost	
Hawaii	0.29 / 100	1,071	Lost	
Washington	0.29 / 100	7,171	Lost	
Kentucky	0.27 / 100	4,173	Lost	
South Carolina	0.25 / 100	3,519	Lost	
Delaware	0.24 / 100	777	Lost	
Mississippi	0.23 / 100	2,265	Lost	
New Mexico	0.23 / 100	1,392	Lost	
New Jersey	0.22 / 100	6,989	Lost	
Maryland	0.21 / 100	4,248	Lost	
Tennessee	0.20 / 100	4,250	Lost	
Virginia	0.20 / 100	5,455	Lost	
Texas	0.19 / 100	12,394	Lost	
Michigan	0.04 / 100	1,851	Lost	

=== Butterfly ballot controversy ===
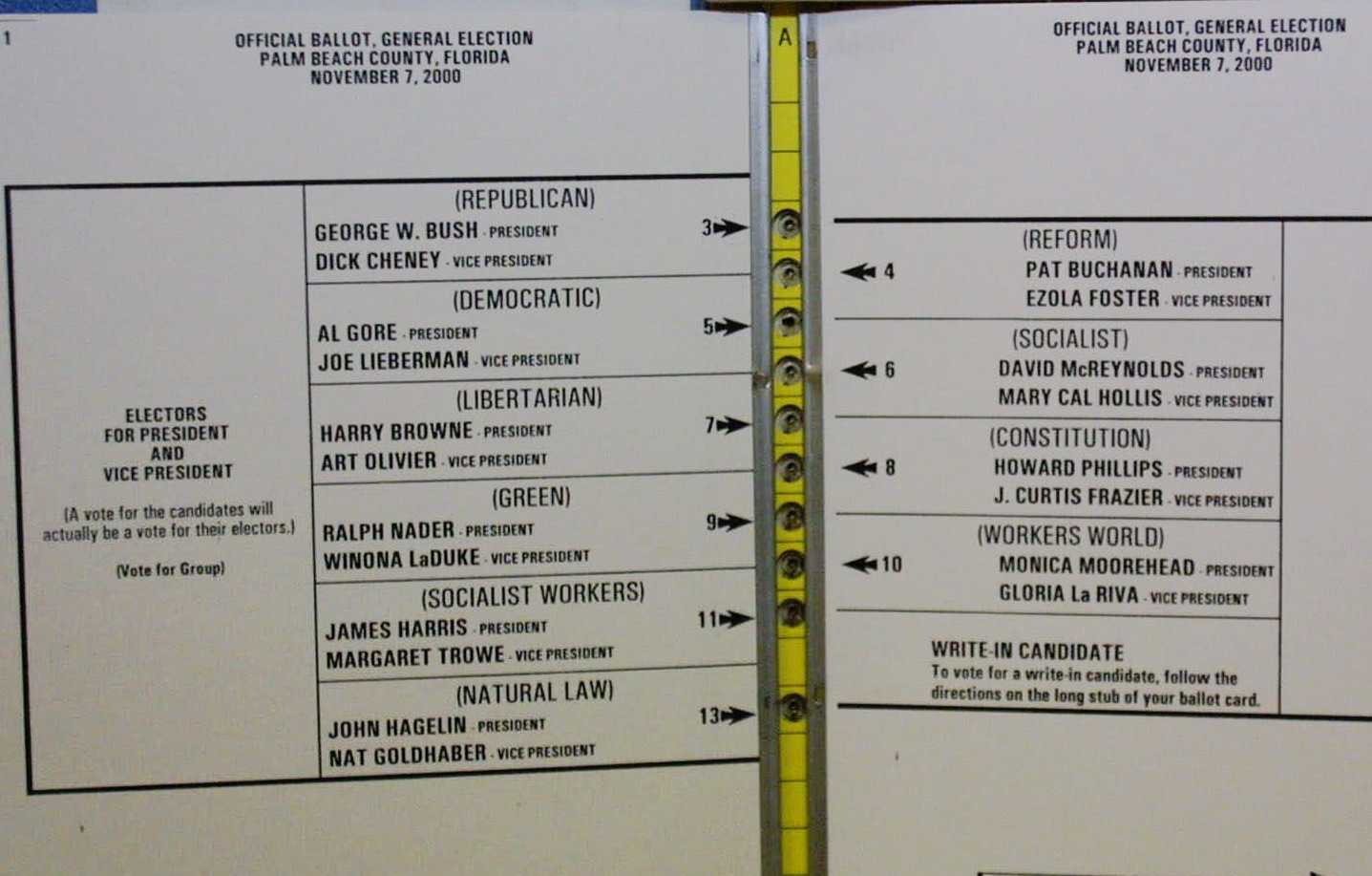
The 'butterfly ballot' was used in Palm Beach County, Florida, where Buchanan received a controversially large number of votes.

In Palm Beach County, Florida, Buchanan received 3,407 votes—which some saw as inconsistent with Palm Beach County's liberal leanings, its large Jewish population and his showing in the rest of the state. Another 19,120 ballots cast statewide were disqualified because they recorded votes for multiple presidential candidates, in some cases because of voters accidentally voting for both Gore and Buchanan. As a result of the county's notorious "butterfly ballot," he is suspected to have gained thousands of inadvertent votes. Bush spokesman Ari Fleischer stated, "Palm Beach County is a Pat Buchanan stronghold and that's why Pat Buchanan received 3,407 votes there." The Bush campaign also claimed that at least 17,000 voters in the county had ties to the Reform Party.

However, Reform Party officials strongly disagreed with Fleischer's assessment, estimating the number of supporters in the county at between 400 and 500; the campaign's Florida coordinator called Fleischer's claim "nonsense". The Palm Beach County election official who had designed the ballot agreed that it was "suspicious" that Buchanan had received so many votes from traditionally Democratic, Jewish precincts. Appearing on The Today Show, Buchanan said:

When I took one look at that ballot on Election Night... it's very easy for me to see how someone could have voted for me in the belief they voted for Al Gore.

An analysis by the Palm Beach Post, printed in March 2001, concurred with Buchanan's assessment, finding that 5,330 Palm Beach voters overvoted by punching both the holes corresponding to votes for Gore and Buchanan. A 2001 study published in the American Political Science Review found that Buchanan's vote share in Palm Beach County was four times greater on election-day ballots than on absentee ballots, which were not created with the butterfly design.

== Aftermath ==
Following the 2000 election, Reformers urged Buchanan to take an active role within the party. Buchanan declined, though he did attend their 2001 convention. Following Buchanan's departure from the party, a number of far-right extremists remained with the party. In the next few years, he identified himself as a political independent, choosing not to align himself with what he viewed as the neoconservative Republican party leadership. Prior to the 2004 election, Buchanan announced he once again identified himself as a Republican, declared that he had no interest in ever running for president again, and — after previously discussing the possibility that he would vote for Constitution Party candidate Michael Peroutka — reluctantly endorsed Bush's 2004 re-election, writing in the American Conservative that

Bush is right on taxes, judges, sovereignty, and values. Kerry is right on nothing.

Buchanan supported the nomination of Donald Trump, who ran on many of the same positions that Buchanan ran on twenty years prior, as Republican presidential candidate for the 2016 presidential election.

== See also ==
- Pat Buchanan 1992 presidential campaign
- Pat Buchanan 1996 presidential campaign
- Donald Trump 2000 presidential campaign
- Donald Trump 2016 presidential campaign
