= 2000 Reform Party presidential primaries =

- July 4–August 10, 2000
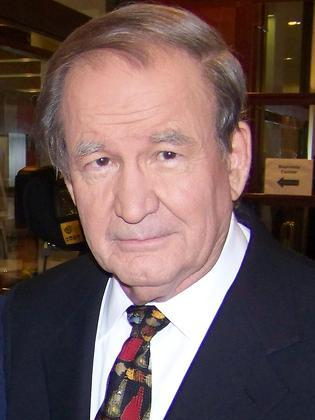

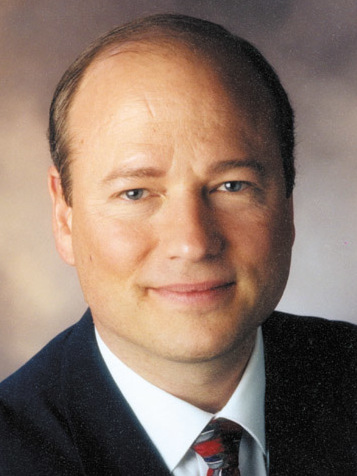
Nominee	Pat Buchanan	John Hagelin
Home state	Virginia	Iowa
States carried	47 + D.C.	3
Popular vote	49,529	28,539
Percentage	63.44%	36.56%
- Mail-In Presidential Primary results map. Buchanan: 50–60% 60–70% 70–80% 80–90% Hagelin: 50–60% 60–70%

Following Ross Perot's impressive showing during the 1996 presidential election, the Reform Party of the United States of America became the country's largest third party. The party's 2000 presidential candidate would be entitled to $12.5 million (~$21.6 million in 2024) in matching funds. Several high-profile candidates vied for the nomination, including future President Donald Trump, Pat Buchanan, and Transcendental Meditation leader John Hagelin. For a brief time, Congressman John B. Anderson and Congressman Ron Paul, who previously ran third party campaigns for President in 1980 and 1988 respectively, were considered potential candidates. Paul ultimately declined to seek the nomination. Anderson's name was placed on the ballot, but he failed to gain significant traction.

The party's 2000 candidates received a great deal of media attention, particularly after a dispute at the party's national convention in Long Beach, California led to a schism and the formation of a rebel faction. Supporters of Transcendental Meditation leader John Hagelin refused to accept Pat Buchanan as the party's chairman, and staged a walk-out, which was broadcast live on television.

Ultimately, a court decided Buchanan was the party's nominee. However, the drama surrounding the convention is often credited with leading to the downfall of the Reform Party. Ross Perot, Jesse Ventura, Pat Buchanan, Donald Trump, and other high-profile party members ultimately left the party after the 2000 election.

== The campaign ==
=== Buchanan enters race ===
During the 1992 Republican Presidential Primaries, commentator Pat Buchanan fared extremely well and received 22.96% of the total vote. During his 1996 bid, Buchanan spent a brief time as the Republican front-runner; his campaign carried four states, including New Hampshire, Alaska, Missouri, and Louisiana. Buchanan re-entered the presidential race in 2000, hoping to be the primary "Stop Bush" candidate. He was, however, viewed much less favorably by his fellow Republicans, and he struggled to place fifth during an Iowa Straw Poll.

Reform Party member William von Raab launched a "Draft Buchanan" movement, and in October 1999 Buchanan announced his departure from the Republican Party, disparaging them (along with the Democrats) as a "beltway party." He announced that he would seek the presidential nomination of the Reform Party, and immediately sought to align himself with the "Russ Verney faction" of the party. Some in the Reform Party voiced concerns that Buchanan, ardently pro-life and anti-gay rights, would inadvertently move the party too far to the right. During a meeting with Reform Party leadership at Pat Choate's Washington, D.C. home, Buchanan assured the party elite that his campaign would not address social issues, instead focusing on economic policy.

At the time Buchanan entered the race, the Reform Party was engulfed in a feud between the supporters of Ross Perot and newly elected Minnesota Governor Jesse Ventura, who, as the Reform Party's highest elected official, was rumored to be considering a presidential bid on the party ticket in 2004. Buchanan's campaign immediately aligned itself with diverse factions within the party, including Russ Verney and Marxist Lenora Fulani.

On November 12, 1999, Fulani formally endorsed Buchanan, saying: "We are going to integrate that peasant army of his. We are going to bring black folks, Latino folks, gay folks and liberal folks into that army...I'm going to take Pat Buchanan to 125th Street in Harlem. We are going to have lunch at Sylvia's. I am going to take him to speak at Reverend Sharpton's National Action Network." Fulani became Buchanan's campaign co-chair.

At the same time, the Buchanan campaign began to gain support among white nationalists. He gained the endorsement of former Ku Klux Klan leader David Duke, who quit the Republican Party and joined the Reform Party to assist Buchanan's campaign. Almost all white nationalists left the Reform Party following the campaign; in 2004 the party nominated Lebanese-American Ralph Nader as its presidential candidate.

=== Trump enters race ===
Supporters of the Jesse Ventura faction began encouraging Donald Trump to enter the race, likely as a placeholder for Ventura, who said he would not consider a presidential bid until after his term as governor ended. On October 19, 1999, Donald Trump announced he would file to appear on the California primary ballot. On October 25, 1999, Trump joined the Reform Party. His pre-campaign gained a great deal of media attention. Trump told Chris Matthews on Hardball: "It's not so much the Reform Party, it's really the fact that I'd want to make that if I ran and spent a lot of money I could actually win, I could beat that Democrat-Republican apparatus." He told Fortune magazine in early January 2000: "'If I feel I could win—win—then I'd run. I think I have a good chance. Hey, I've got my name on half the major buildings in New York,' he said. 'I went to the Wharton School of Finance, which is the No. 1 school. I'm intelligent. Some people would say I'm very, very, very intelligent." He further said: "It's very possible that I could be the first presidential candidate to run and make money on it."

During the California primary, he received 15,311 votes or 37% of the Reform votes cast, giving him the lead in a five-person field. His total was 0.3% of the entire California primary vote. Trump ultimately withdrew his candidacy. During an appearance on The Today Show, he stated: "The Reform Party is a total mess! You have Buchanan, a right winger, and you have Fulani, a Communist, and they have merged.... I don't know what you have!"

=== Schism ===
Leader of the Transcendental Meditation movement John Hagelin also entered the race for the Reform Party nomination. Hagelin had run for president in both 1992 and 1996 on the Natural Law Party ticket.

During his 2000 campaign, Hagelin appeared on ABC's Nightline (2000) and Politically Incorrect (2000), NBC's Meet the Press (2000), CNN's Larry King Live, PBS's News Hour with Jim Lehrer, Inside Politics, CNBC's Hardball with Chris Matthews, and C-SPAN's Washington Journal.

In July it was announced that Hagelin and Buchanan would be the only two candidates on the primary ballot. Supporters of Hagelin later charged the results of the party's open primary, which favored Buchanan by a wide margin, were "tainted." Buchanan countered that Russ Verney had allowed the Hagelin campaign to mail a "Stop Buchanan" pamphlet using official "Reform Party" envelopes.

Much to the dismay of many Reform Party members, it became clear that the Hagelin campaign intended to merge the Natural Law Party, which was based on the teachings of Hindu guru Maharishi Mahesh Yogi with the secular Reform Party. On August 2, Buchanan's website posted a copy of a proposed resolution to merge the two parties.

The animosity between the two campaigns reached a breaking point at the party's convention in Long Beach, California. Buchanan supporters blocked Hagelin and his delegates from entering the convention. Hagelin's supporters declared the convention illegitimate, and announced their own rival convention nearby, where they endorsed John Hagelin as their presidential candidate.

With two individuals both claiming to be the Reform Party candidate, a court would have to determine who would be permitted to appear on the ballot and receive the $12.5 million in matching funds.

== Results of the mail-in primary by state ==
States won by Pat Buchanan
States won by John Hagelin

2000 Reform Party presidential primaries by state
	Pat Buchanan		John Hagelin		Margin		State Total	
State	#	%	#	%	#	%	#	
Alabama	222	79.29	58	20.71	164	58.58	280	AL
Alaska	549	79.80	139	20.20	410	59.60	688	AK
Arizona	1,042	72.77	390	27.23	652	45.54	1,432	AZ
Arkansas	347	80.70	83	19.30	264	61.40	430	AR
California	8,166	51.95	7,554	48.05	612	3.90	15,720	CA
Colorado	571	43.69	736	56.31	−165	−12.62	1,307	CO
Connecticut	557	63.44	321	36.56	236	26.88	878	CT
Delaware	125	73.10	46	26.90	79	46.20	171	DE
D.C.	78	59.09	54	40.91	24	18.18	132	DC
Florida	2,806	63.93	1,583	36.07	1,223	27.86	4,389	FL
Georgia	807	73.03	298	26.97	509	46.06	1,105	GA
Hawaii	67	35.08	124	64.92	−57	−29.84	191	HI
Idaho	289	73.35	105	26.65	184	46.70	394	ID
Illinois	1,896	79.26	496	20.74	1,400	58.52	2,392	IL
Indiana	931	77.39	272	22.61	659	54.78	1,203	IN
Iowa	1,192	50.90	1,150	49.10	42	1.80	2,342	IA
Kansas	663	69.21	295	30.79	368	38.42	958	KS
Kentucky	571	66.24	291	33.76	280	32.48	862	KY
Louisiana	472	81.66	106	18.34	366	63.32	578	LA
Maine	284	58.32	203	41.68	81	16.64	487	ME
Maryland	710	54.64	369	45.36	52	9.28	560	MD
Massachusetts	1,010	69.94	434	30.06	576	39.88	1,444	MA
Michigan	1,812	69.48	796	30.52	1,016	38.96	2,608	MI
Minnesota	1,213	73.20	444	26.80	769	46.40	1,657	MN
Mississippi	256	82.05	56	17.95	200	64.10	312	MS
Missouri	1,128	72.73	423	27.27	705	45.46	1,551	MO
Montana	245	75.38	80	24.62	165	50.76	325	MT
Nebraska	267	75.85	85	24.15	182	51.70	352	NE
Nevada	341	65.33	181	34.67	160	30.66	522	NV
New Hampshire	801	76.87	241	23.13	560	53.74	1,041	NH
New Jersey	1,406	77.94	398	22.06	1,008	55.88	1,804	NJ
New Mexico	273	59.61	185	40.39	88	19.22	458	NM
New York	4,160	52.51	3,762	47.49	398	5.03	7,922	NY
North Carolina	896	49.28	922	50.72	26	1.44	1,818	NC
North Dakota	192	89.72	22	10.28	70	79.44	214	ND
Ohio	2,181	72.53	826	27.47	1,355	45.06	3,007	OH
Oklahoma	474	74.65	161	25.35	635	49.30	1,758	OK
Oregon	269	65.04	141	34.96	128	30.08	410	OR
Pennsylvania	2,809	70.94	756	29.06	2,053	41.88	3,565	PA
Rhode Island	164	68.33	76	31.67	88	36.66	240	RI
South Carolina	567	77.88	161	22.12	406	55.76	728	SC
South Dakota	158	77.07	47	22.93	111	54.14	205	SD
Tennessee	641	74.80	216	25.20	425	49.60	767	TN
Texas	1,690	63.32	979	36.68	711	26.64	2,669	TX
Utah	266	66.17	136	33.83	130	32.34	402	UT
Vermont	94	65.96	70	34.04	24	31.92	164	VT
Virginia	1,035	67.03	509	32.97	526	34.06	1,544	VA
Washington	1,054	51.69	985	48.31	69	3.38	2,039	WA
West Virginia	326	84.90	58	15.10	268	69.80	384	WV
Wisconsin	946	67.38	458	32.62	248	34.76	586	WI
Wyoming	98	55.46	33	44.54	65	10.92	131	WY
TOTALS:	49,529	63.44	28,539	36.56	20,990	26.89	78,068	US

== Maps ==
2000 Michigan Reform presidential primary
- February 22, 2000
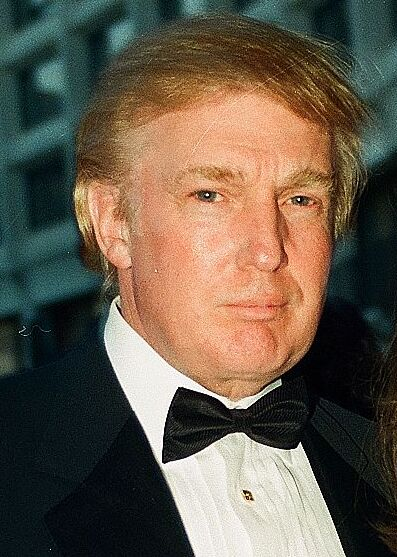

Nominee	Donald Trump	Uncommitted
Home state	New York	-
Popular vote	2,164	948
Percentage	69.54%	30.46%
- County Results; Donald Trump Uncommitted Tie; Congressional district results Trump: 50–60% 60–70% 70–80%

2000 California Reform presidential primary
- March 7, 2000
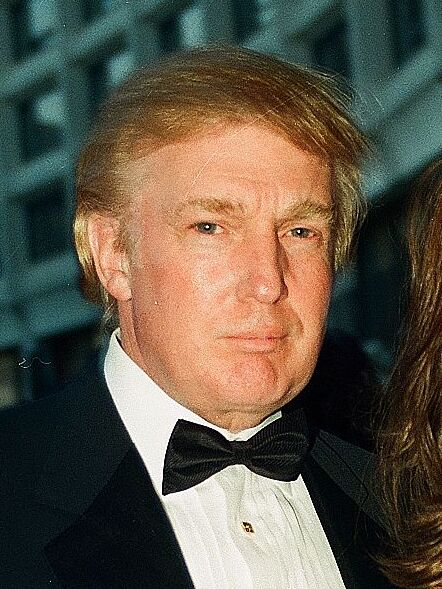

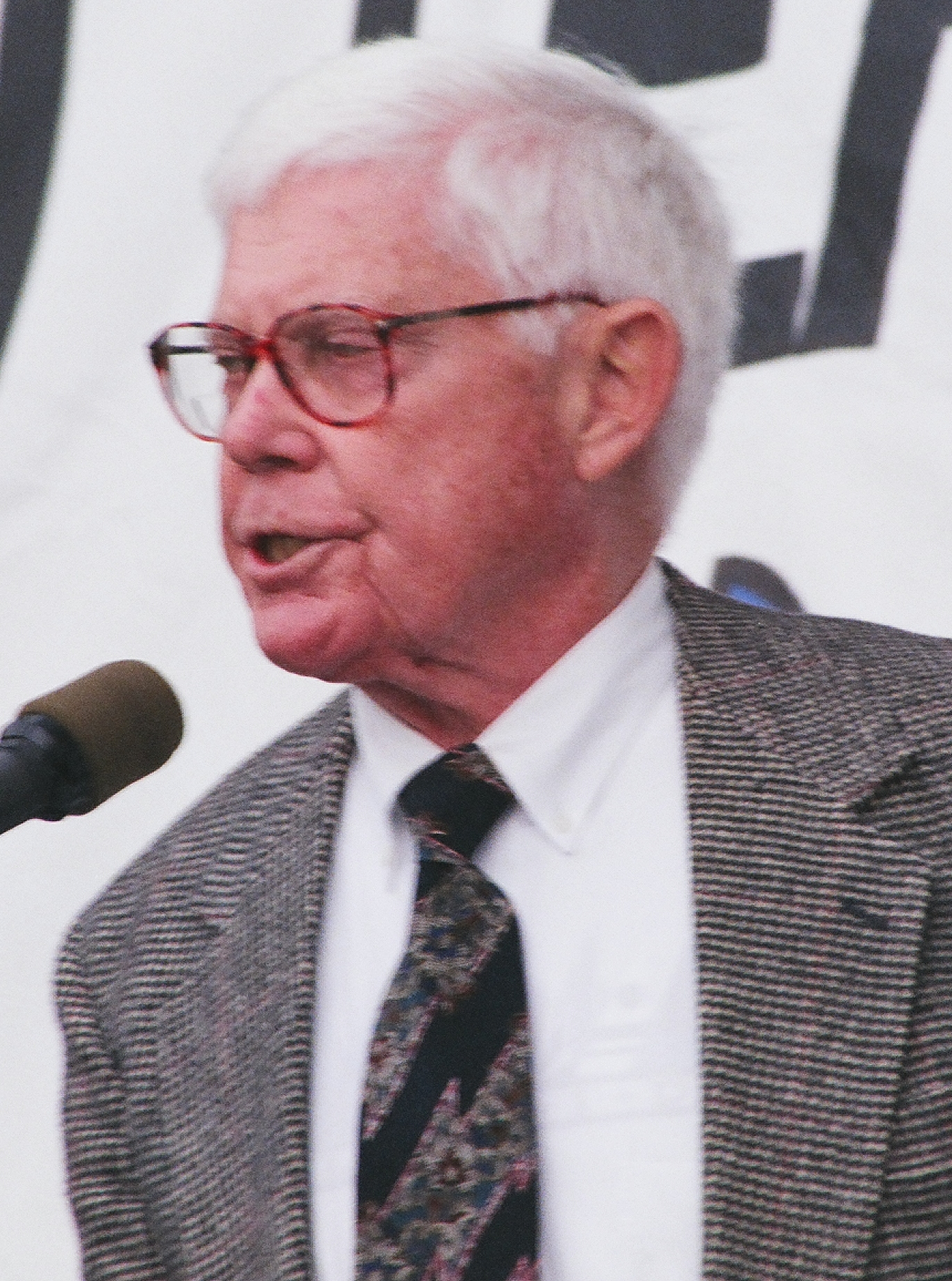

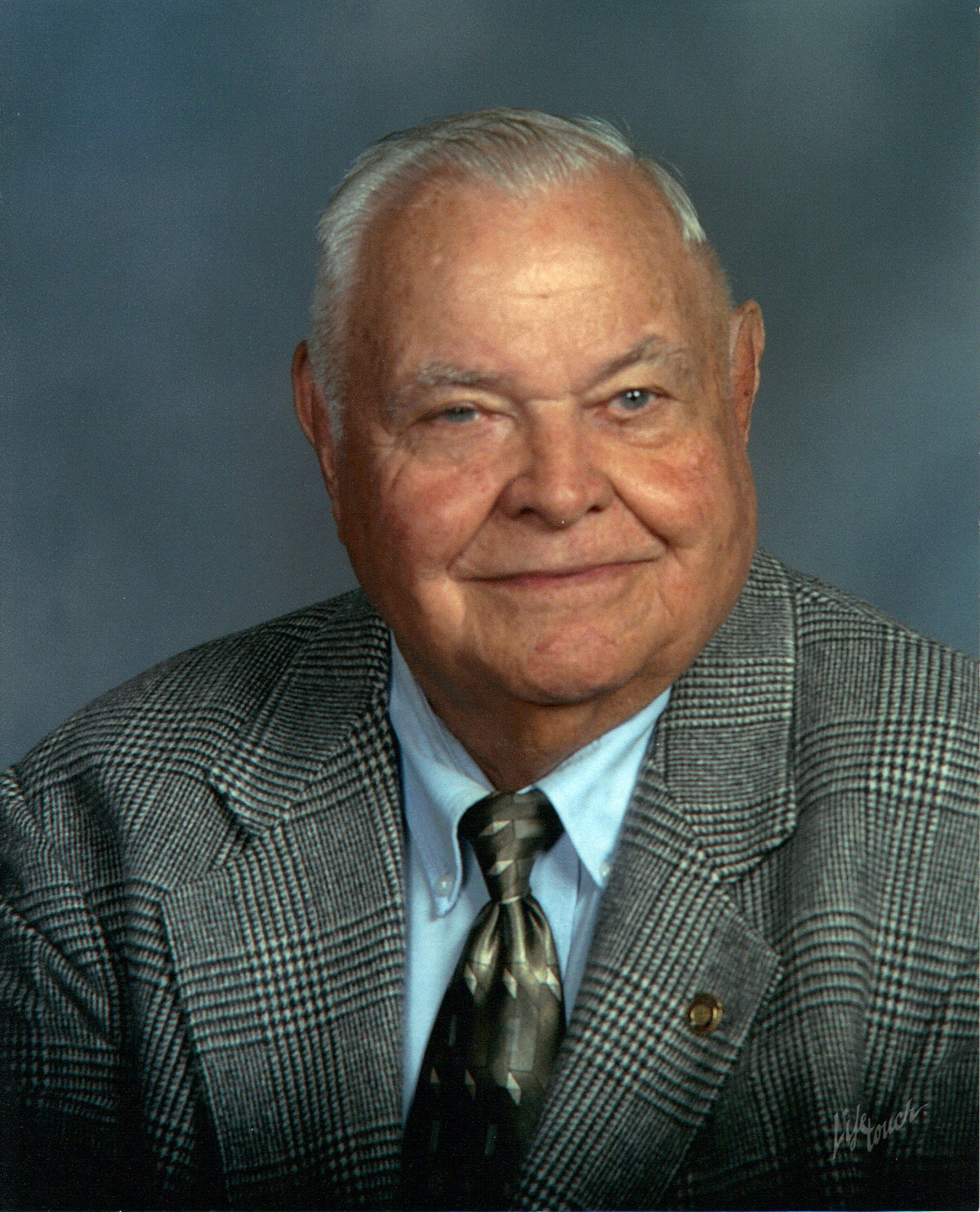
Nominee	Donald Trump	John B. Anderson	Robert M. Bowman
Home state	New York	Illinois	California
Popular vote	714	469	292
Percentage	36.67%	24.09%	15.00%
Nominee	Charles E. Collins	George D. Weber
Home state	Georgia	Missouri
Popular vote	240	217
Percentage	12.33%	11.15%
- County results Trump: 20–30% 30–40% 40–50% 50–60% 60–70% 100% Anderson 20–30% 30–40% 40–50% 60–70% Bowman 30–40% 40–50% 50–60% Collins 30–40% 40–50% 50–60% 100% Tie 20–30% 30–40% 40–50% 50%

== Post-convention ==
Ultimately, when the Federal Election Commission ruled Buchanan was to receive ballot status as the Reform candidate, as well as about $12.6 million in federal campaign funds secured by Perot's showing in the 1996 election, Buchanan won the nomination. In his acceptance speech, Buchanan proposed U.S. withdrawal from the United Nations and expelling the U.N. from New York, abolishing the Internal Revenue Service, Department of Education, Department of Energy, Department of Housing and Urban Development, taxes on inheritance and capital gains, and affirmative action programs.

As his running mate, Buchanan chose African-American activist and retired teacher from Los Angeles, Ezola B. Foster. Buchanan was supported in this election run by future Socialist Party USA presidential candidate Brian Moore, who said in 2008 he supported Buchanan in 2000 because "he was for fair trade over free trade. He had some progressive positions that I thought would be helpful to the common man." On August 19, the New York Right to Life Party, in convention, chose Buchanan as their nominee, with 90% of the districts voting for him.

On November 2, party founder Ross Perot endorsed Republican George W. Bush for president.

The Reform Party never recovered from the 2000 fiasco. Many longtime members departed, the party's funds were depleted, and its reputation severely tarnished. On Election Day, Pat Buchanan only received 448,895 votes, thus losing the Reform Party's ballot access in most states. Buchanan returned to the Republican Party in 2001. During the 2004 election cycle, the Reform Party nominated Ralph Nader in hopes of relinquishing themselves of the "pro-life" label Buchanan had bestowed upon them. In 2008, Ted Weill, who had been a critic of Buchanan, was the party's presidential candidate. Donald Trump joined the Democratic Party in 2001, left in 2009 and remained an independent until 2012 when he returned to the Republican Party, seeking the party's nomination for president in 2016 and became the 45th President of the United States after defeating Democratic nominee Hillary Clinton, he would lose to Joe Biden in 2020. Trump would be renominated by the Republican Party in 2024, and became the 47th President of the United States after defeating Biden's vice president and Democratic nominee Kamala Harris.

== Candidates ==
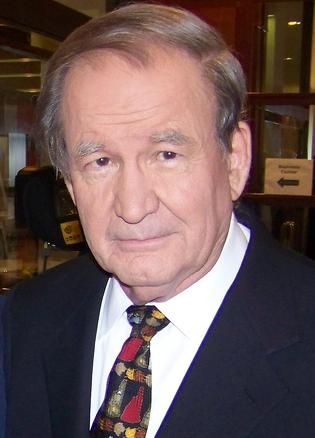
Former White House Communications Director Pat Buchanan of Virginia
(Campaign)

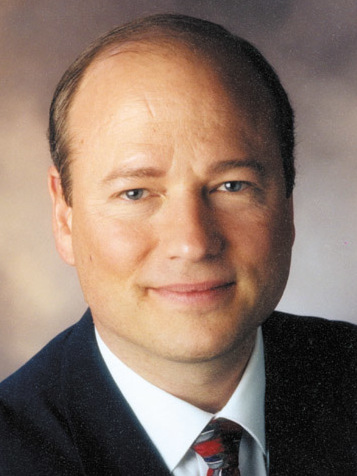
Leader of the Transcendental Meditation movement John Hagelin of Iowa

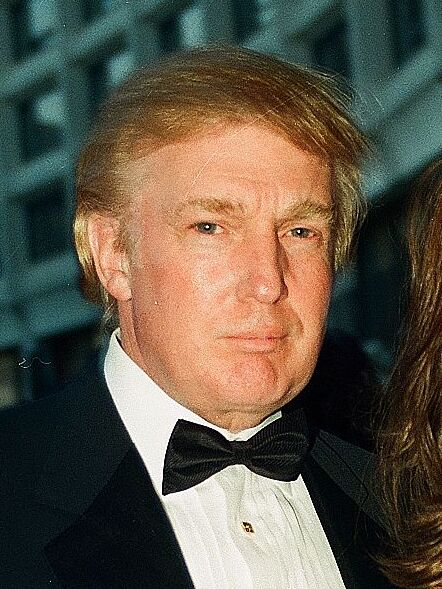
Businessman Donald Trump of New York
(Campaign)
Withdrew Feb. 14th, 2000

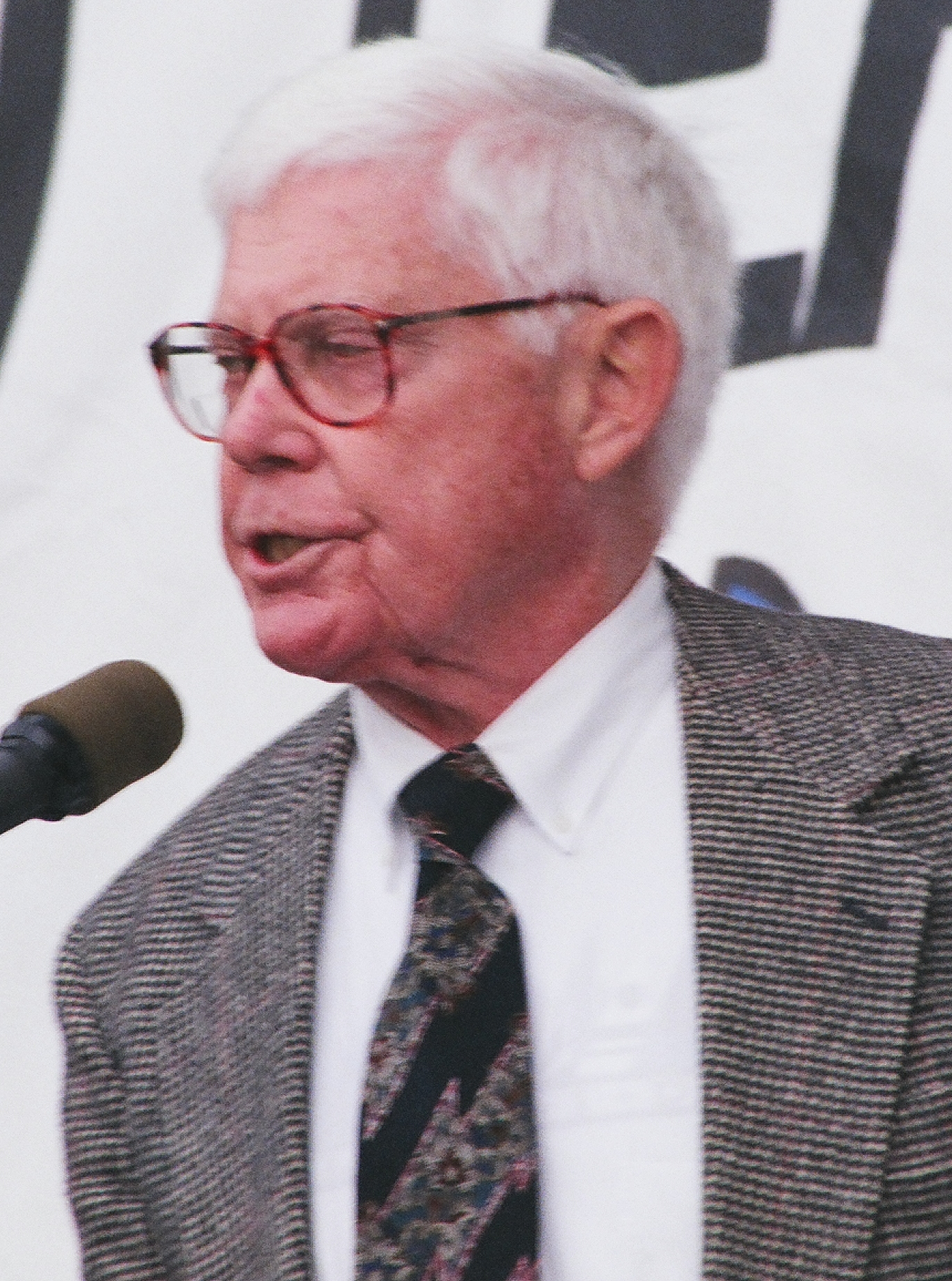
Former Representative John B. Anderson of Illinois

Activist and 1996 candidate Charles Collins from Georgia

Veterans for Peace activist Robert M. Bowman from California

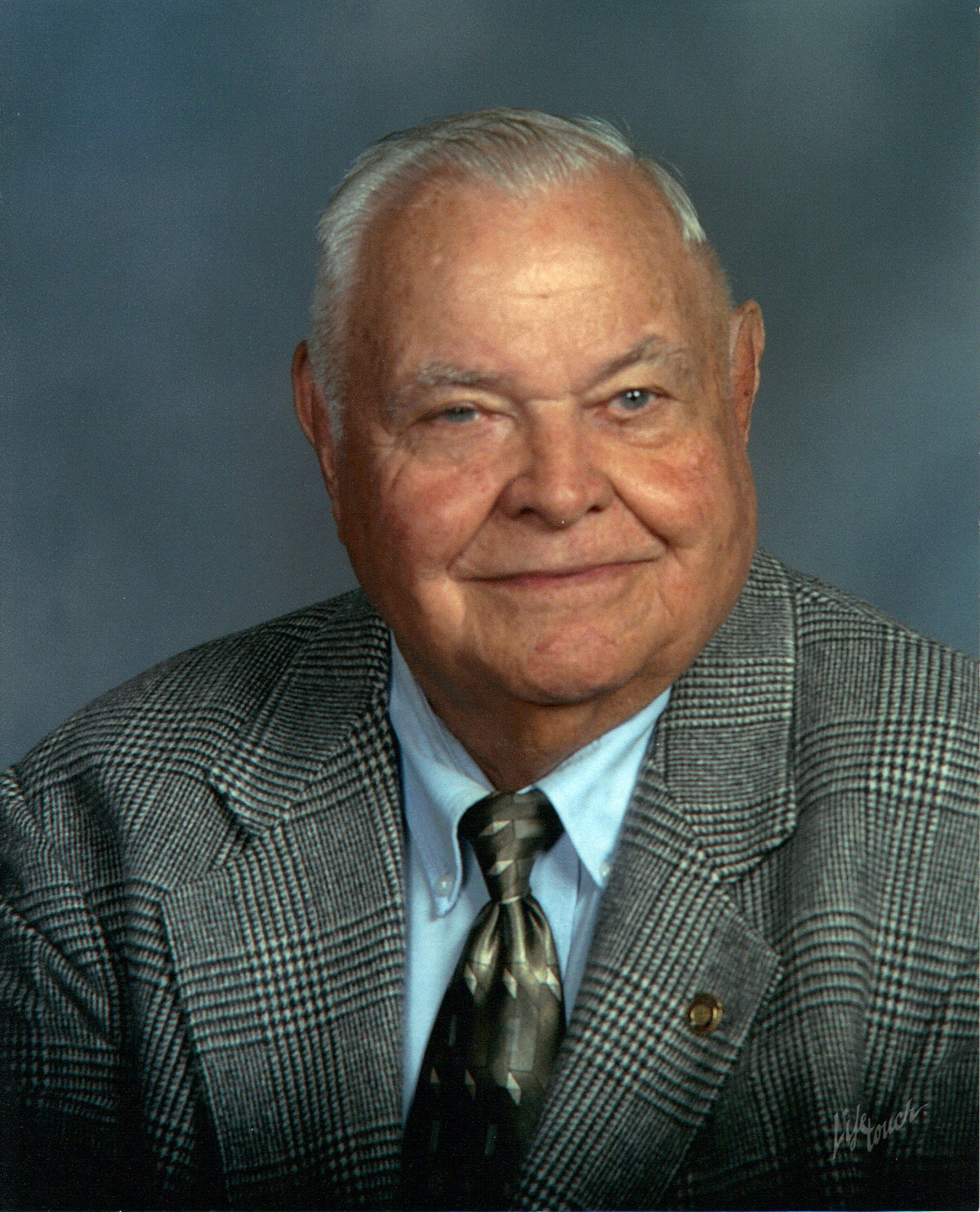
Former state Representative George D. Weber from Missouri

=== Declined to run ===
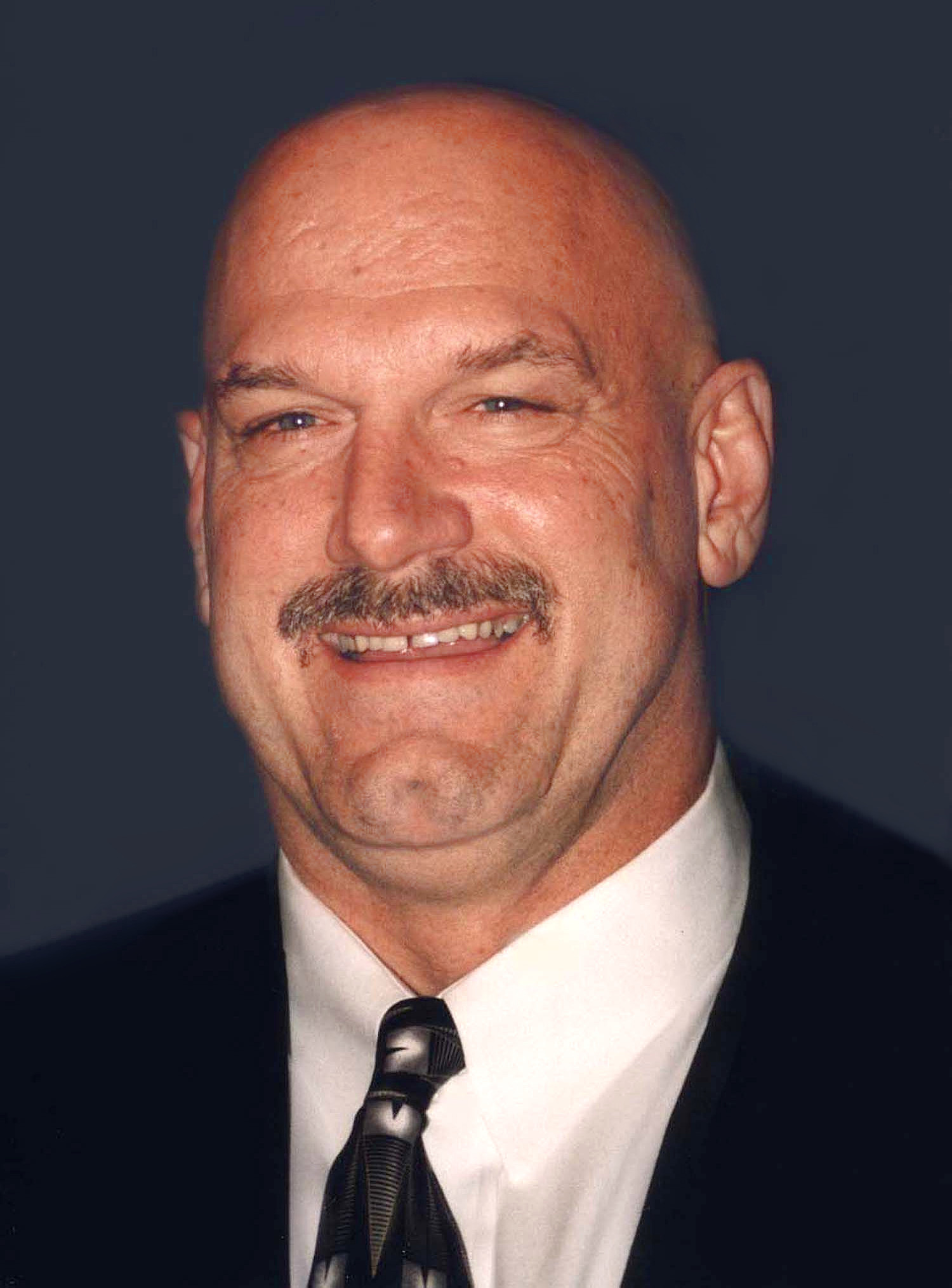
Governor Jesse Ventura of Minnesota

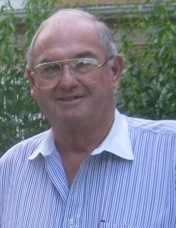
Former Governor Lowell Weicker of Connecticut

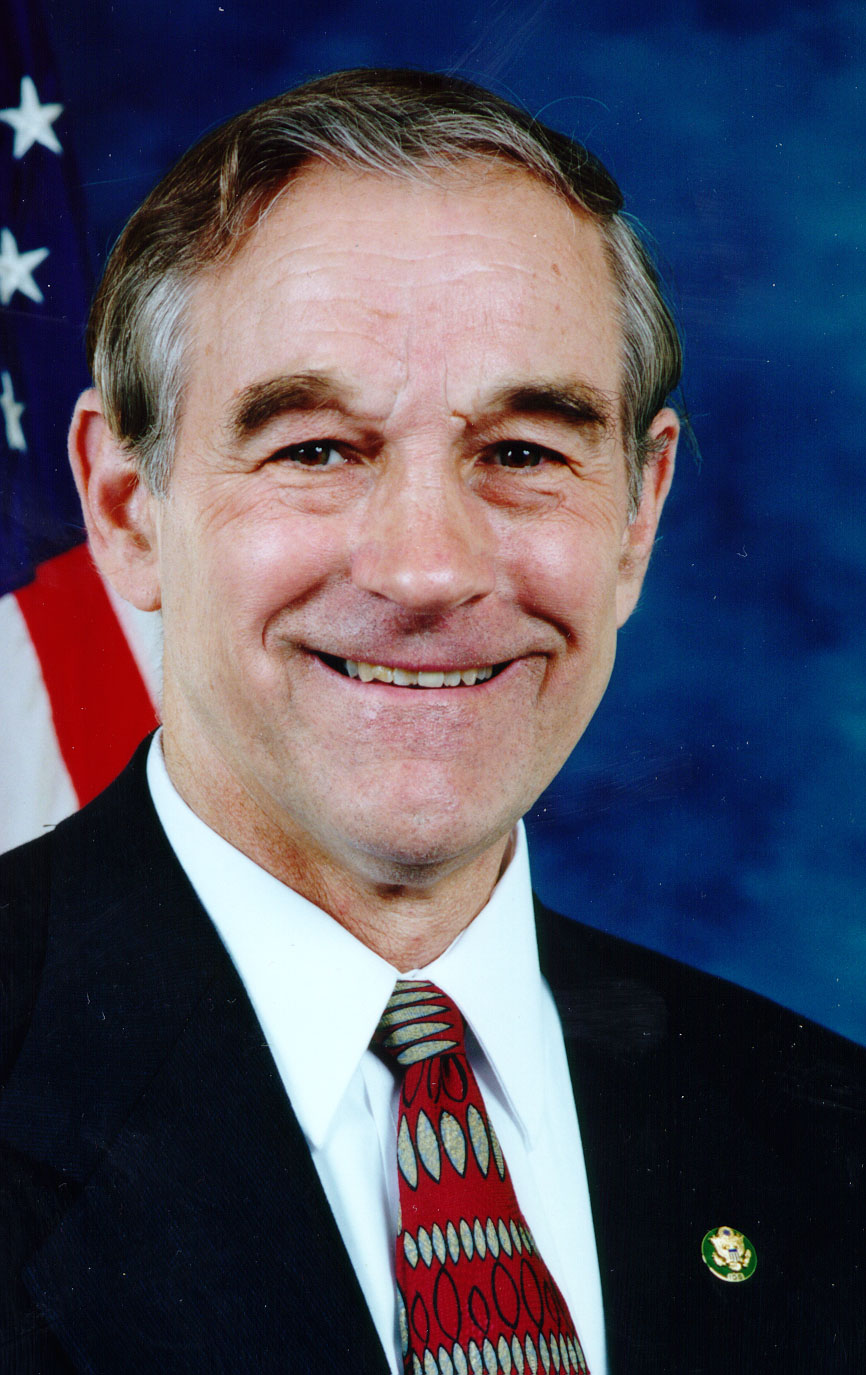
Representative Ron Paul of Texas

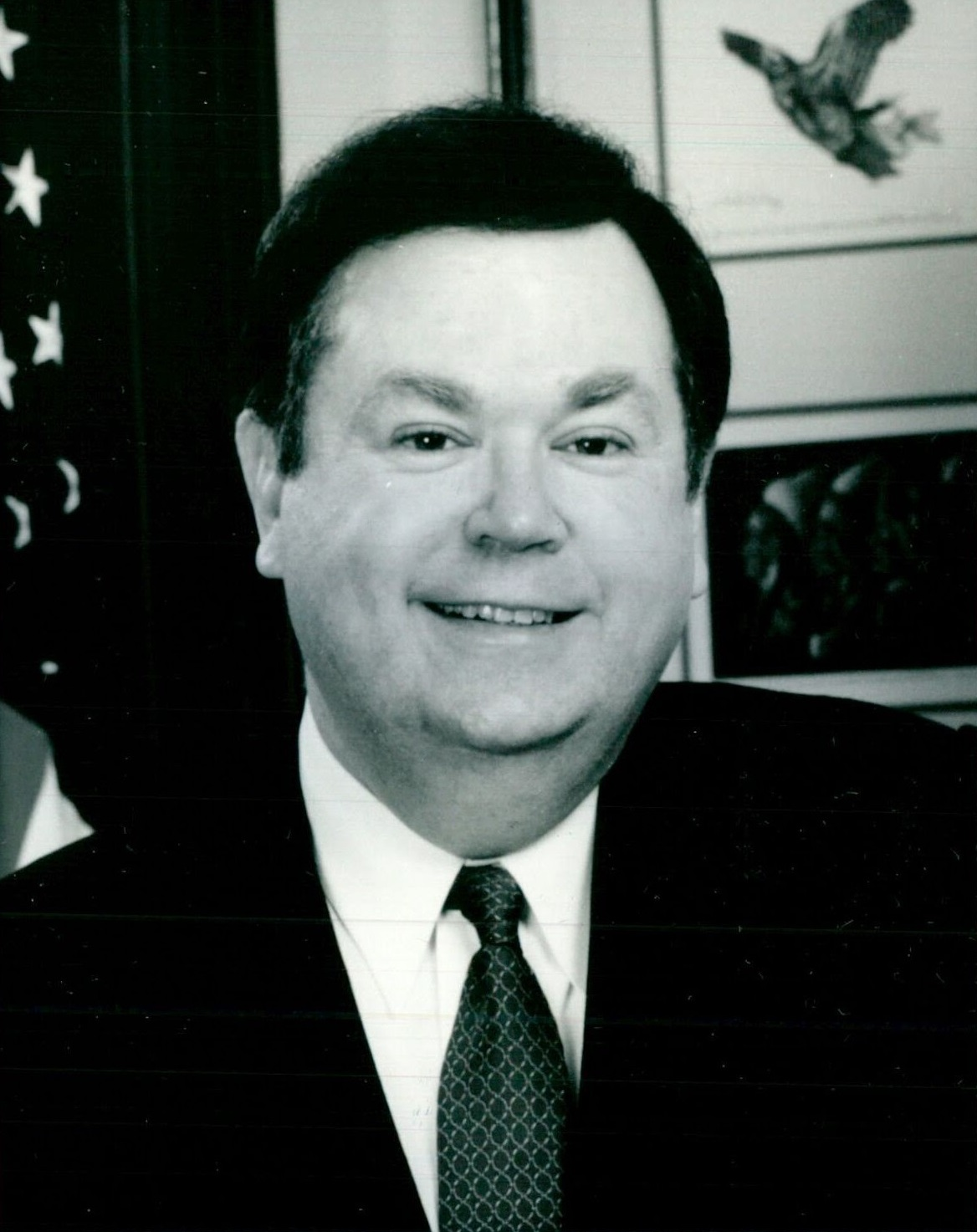
Former Senator David Boren of Oklahoma

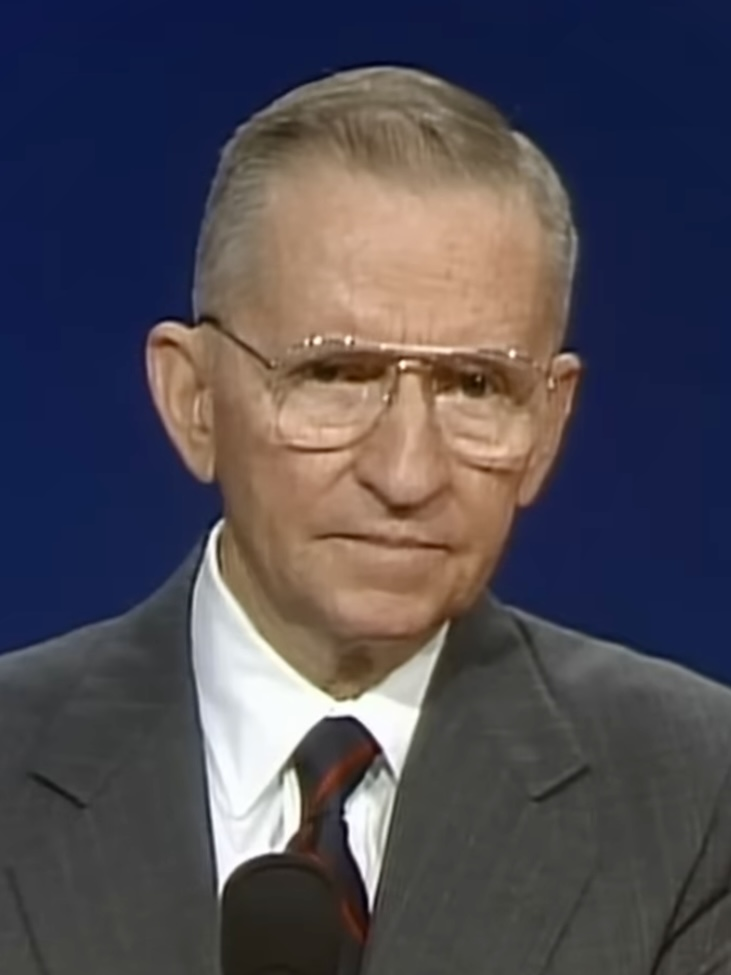
Billionaire, party founder and 1996 presidential nominee Ross Perot from Texas

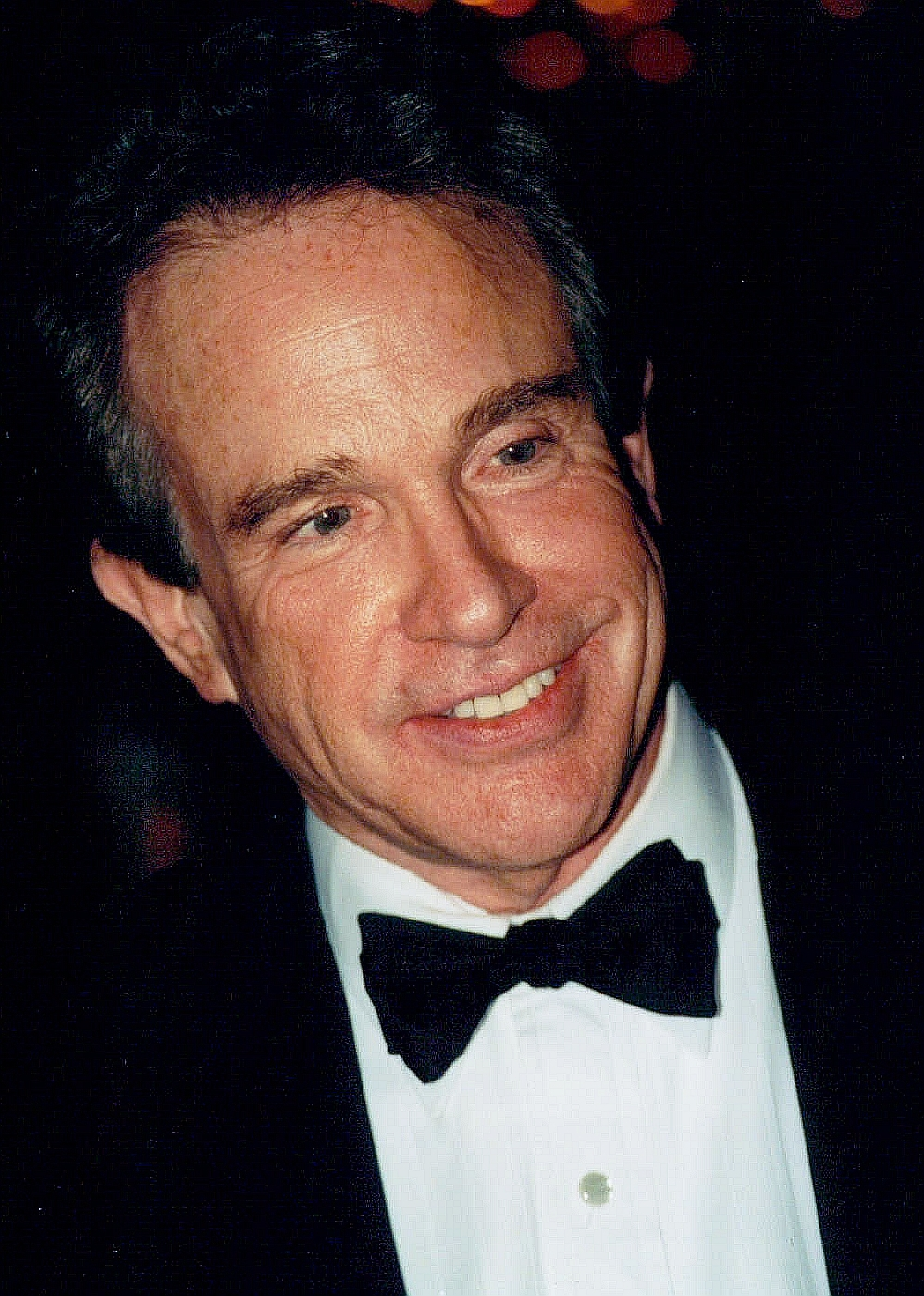
Actor and director Warren Beatty from Virginia

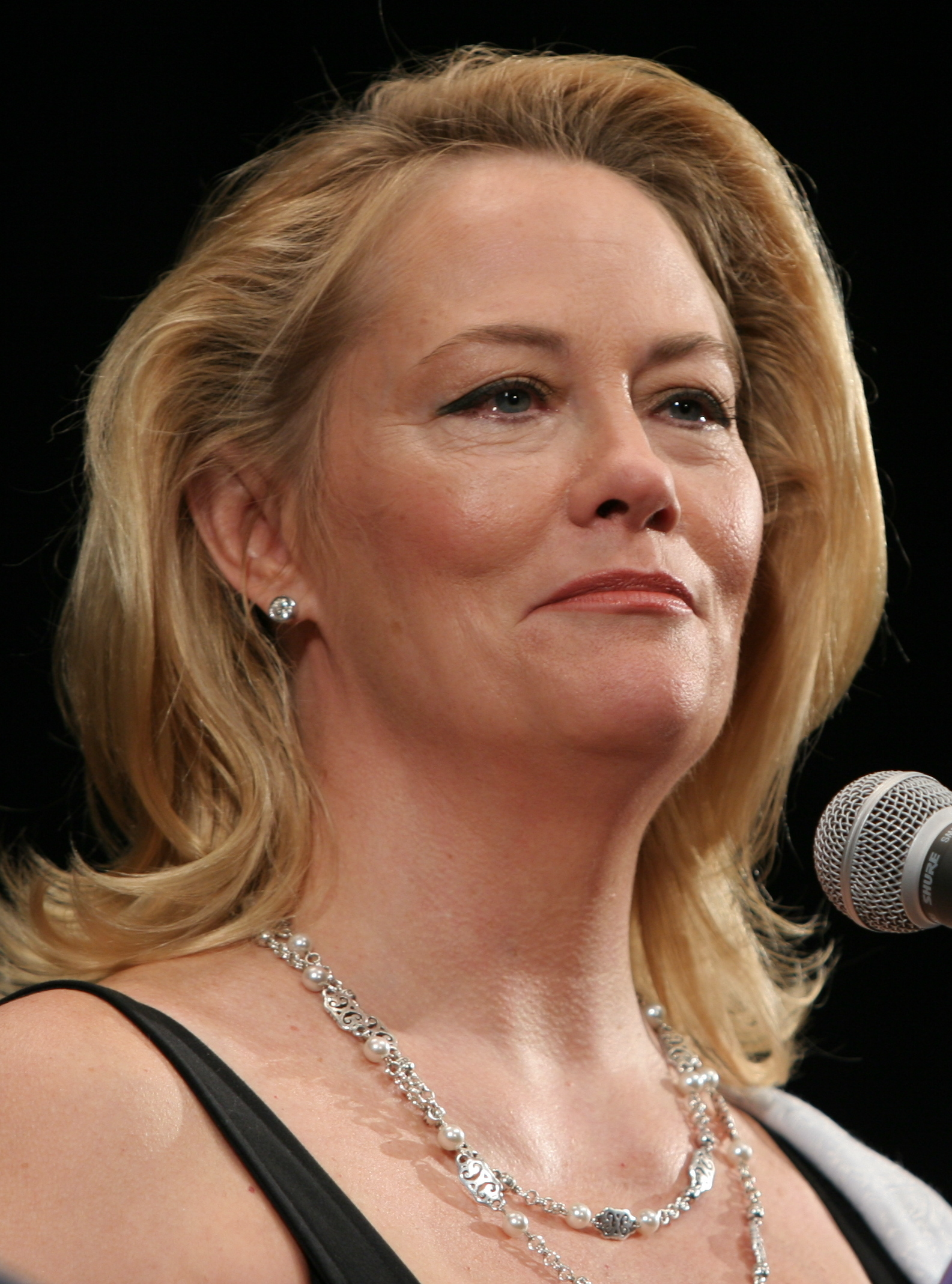
Actress Cybill Shepherd from Tennessee

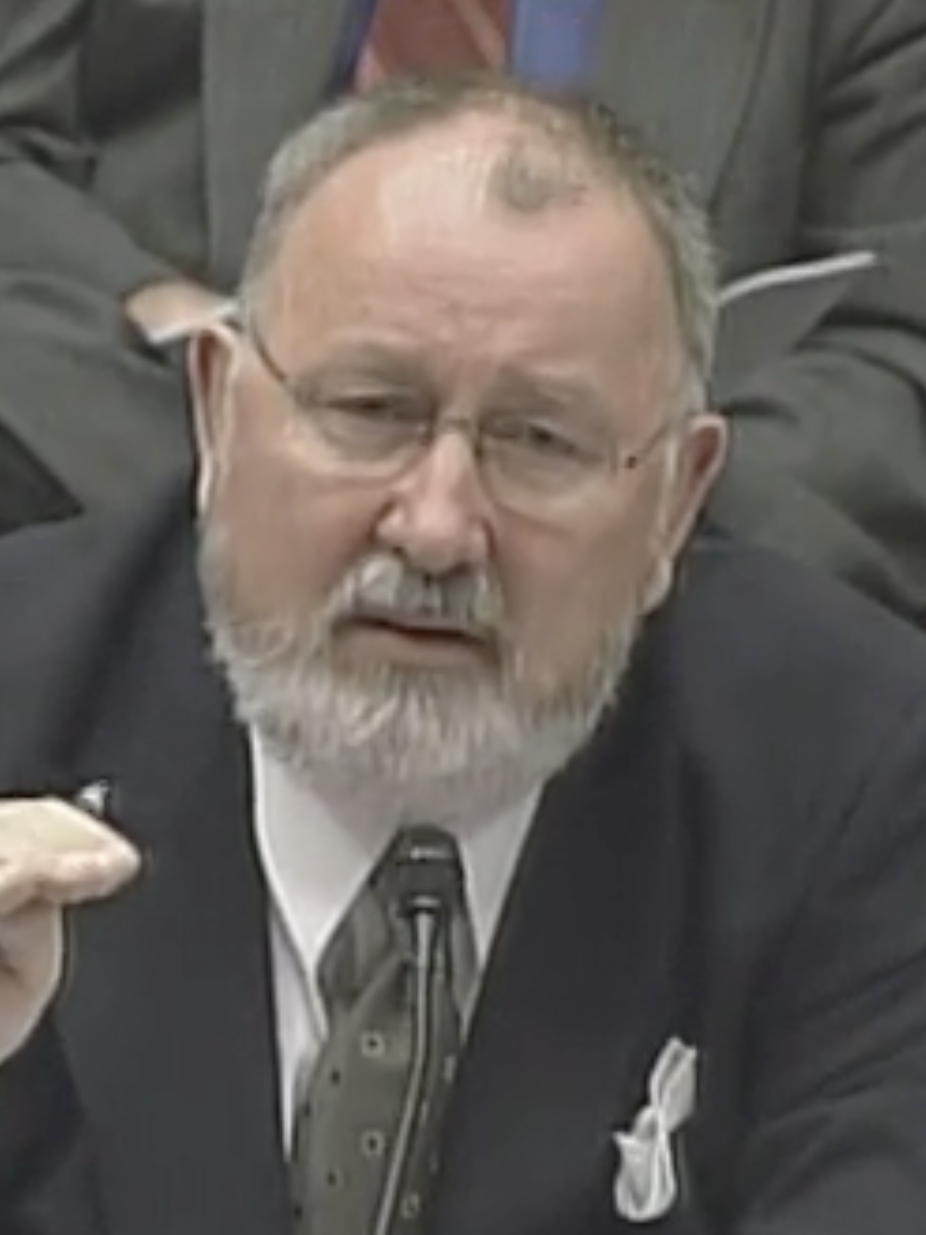
Economist and 1996 vice presidential nominee Pat Choate from Oklahoma

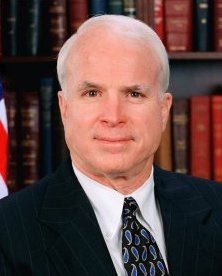
Senator and Republican candidate John McCain from Arizona

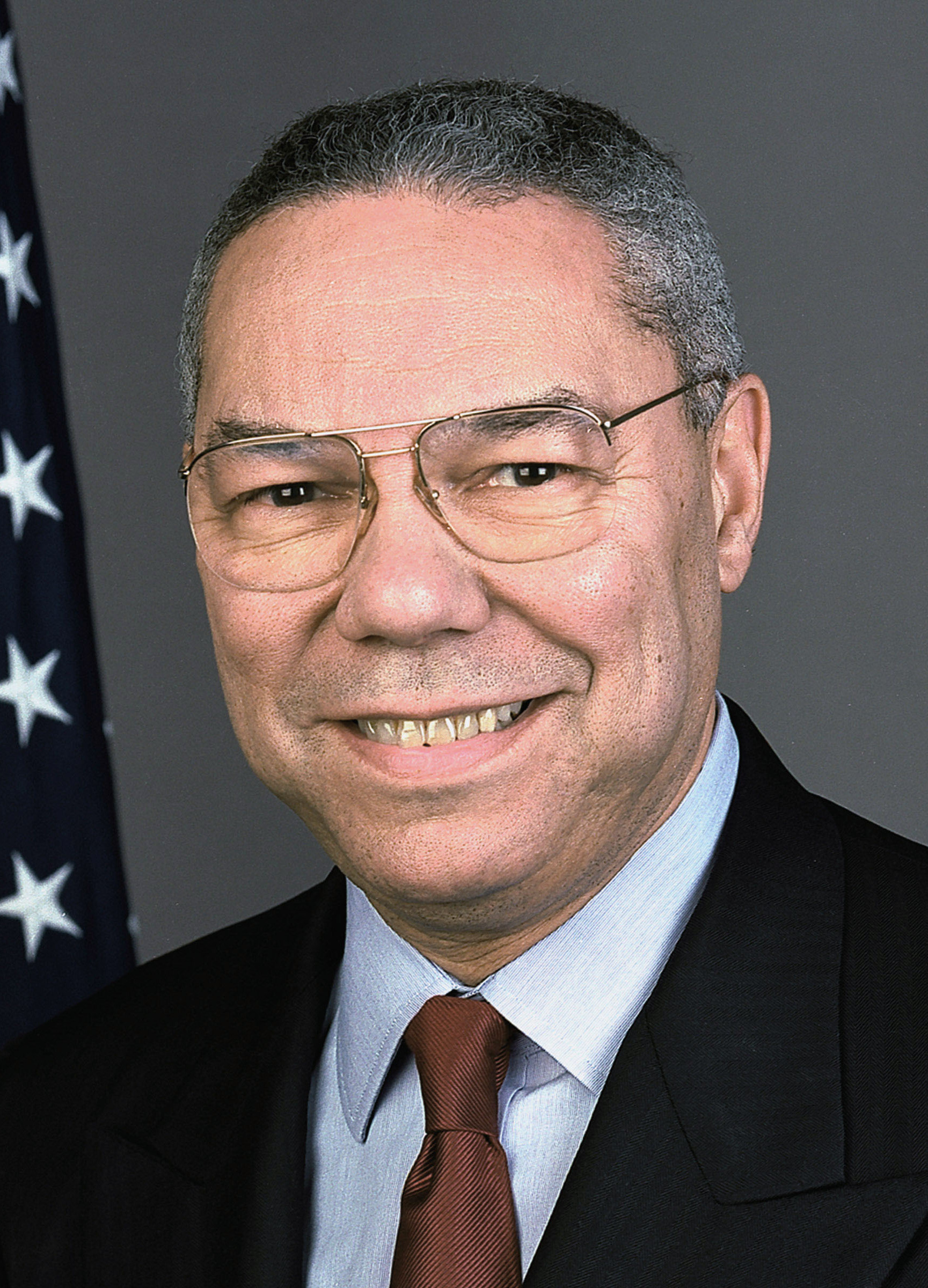
Former Chairman of the Joint Chiefs of Staff Colin Powell from Virginia

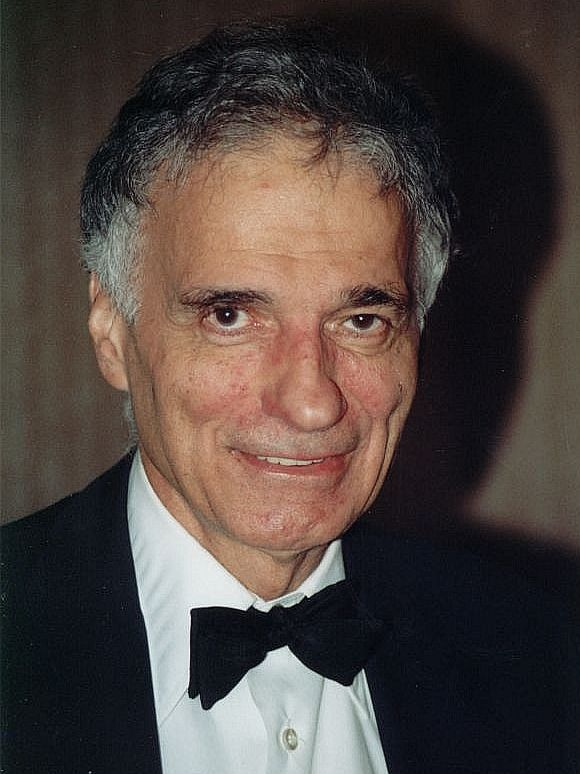
Consumer advocate and Green candidate Ralph Nader from Connecticut

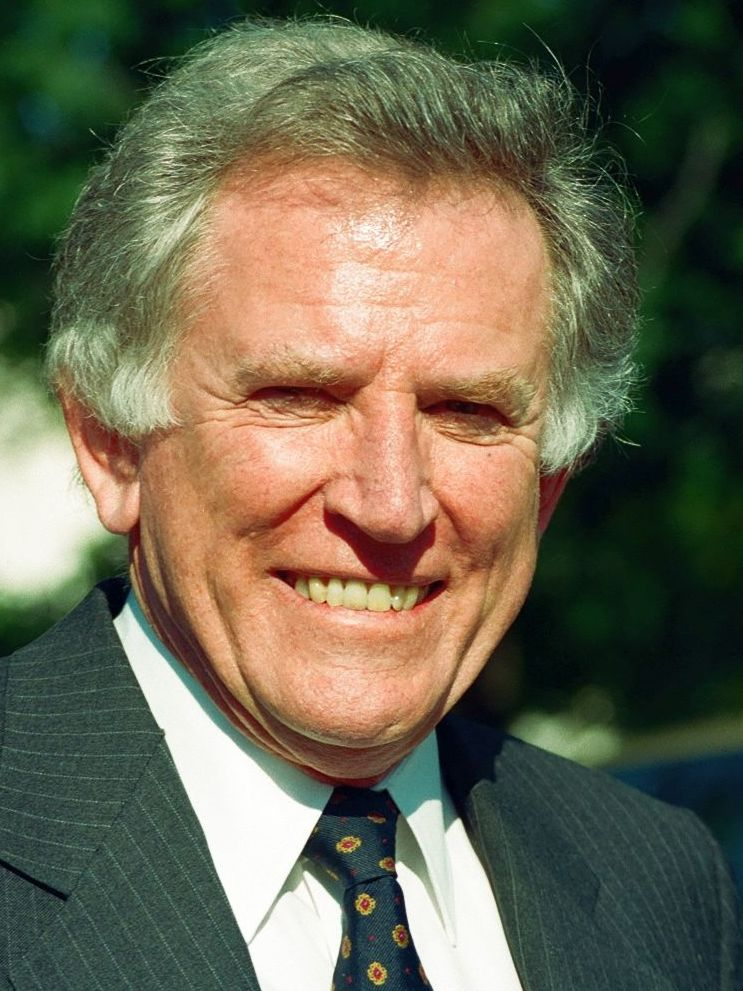
Former Senator Gary Hart from Colorado

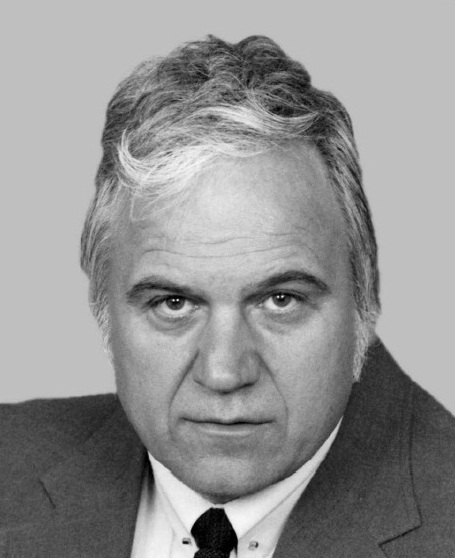
Representative James Traficant from Ohio
