= Robert M. Bowman =

American US Air Force officer (1934–2013)

Robert M. Bowman

Robert M. Bowman (September 19, 1934 – August 22, 2013) was a former director of advanced space programs development for the U.S. Air Force in the Ford and Carter administrations, and a former United States Air Force lieutenant colonel with 101 combat missions. He received a Ph.D. in aeronautics and nuclear engineering from the California Institute of Technology.

Bowman, the father of theologian Robert M. Bowman, Jr., was the founding archbishop of the United Catholic Church, an "independent Catholic fellowship" created in 1996 and held to be connected through apostolic succession to the Old Catholic Churches. Bowman retired as archbishop in June 2006. He was consecrated as bishop on 18 April 1996 by Bishop William Dennis Donovan (1943–1997), assisted by Bishops Orlando Hyppolitus Lima y Aguirre (1934–2009) and Grant W. Cover (born 1965). Additionally, he was executive director of Christian Support Ministries. Bowman was a prominent figure in the 9/11 Truth movement.

== Activism ==
Despite his involvement with space programs and defense, Bowman emerged as an early public critic of the Strategic Defense Initiative (SDI, aka "Star Wars") during the Ronald Reagan administration. On The MacNeil-Lehrer NewsHour, he called it "the ultimate military lunacy, easily overwhelmed and vulnerable". Bowman founded the Institute for Space and Security Studies and its publication Space & Security News (1983) (ISSN 1071-2569). He also authored two books on the subject of SDI and was a critic of an outgrowth of the SDI program, the George W. Bush administration's proposed National Missile Defense.

For several years Bowman was active with Veterans for Peace and Vietnam Veterans Against the War as a speaker. He had also been a member of the Peace Commission of the Episcopal Diocese of Washington.

In 1998, Project Censored cited Bowman's article "Our Continuing War Against Iraq" in the May 1998 issue of Space and Security News as one of the few (along with Bill Blum of the San Francisco Bay Guardian and Dennis Bernstein) covering what they deemed the fifth most censored story, "U.S. Weapons of Mass Destruction Linked to the Deaths of Half a Million Children". The WMDs referred to are the biological samples sent to Iraq from the United States up to 1989, and use of depleted uranium during the Gulf War.

In a radio interview on April 12, 2007, Bowman said:

Technological feasibility of a defensive shield is entirely irrelevant, because Star Wars has nothing to do with defense. It is an attempt to deploy offensive weapons disguised as defense.

In 1982, in his secret defense guidance document, Ronald Reagan ordered the Department of Defense to develop Star Wars weapons, and he assigned them two missions.

One: Destroy opposing satellites and seize control of space.

Two: Destroy targets on the surface of the earth from space without warning.

There wasn't a word in there about shooting down ballistic missiles. That was a smokescreen for the American people, because they knew that the American people would never approve weapons in space for offensive purposes.

Bowman was very vocal about 9/11 and disputed the commonly accepted version of events. He said, "The truth about 9/11 is that we don't KNOW the truth about 9/11, and we should", and "If they have nothing to hide, why are they hiding everything?" The latter was referring to what he believed to be the hiding of videotapes of the Pentagon crash, and the black boxes from the planes. On September 11, 2004, Bowman stated in New York Townhall, "I think the very kindest thing that we can say about George W. Bush and all the people in the U.S. government that have been involved in this massive cover-up, is that they were aware of the impending attacks and let them happen. Now some people will say that's much too kind. However, even that is high treason and conspiracy to commit murder."

== Political ambitions ==
In 2000, he campaigned nationwide for the nomination of the Reform Party of the United States of America for President of the United States. In some Reform Party straw polls, he polled better than the ultimate winner of the nomination Pat Buchanan, though still 40 points behind the frontrunner John Hagelin. In the California 2000 presidential primaries, he came in third among five Reform Party candidates, after Donald Trump and John B. Anderson, with 15% of the vote. Including "votes cast by Independents or voters of another party", he came in third among six Reform Party candidates with 14% of the vote, after Trump and George D. Weber.

Bowman was also considered as one of the running mates for Hagelin, who was running as the Natural Law Party candidate for president and also one of the frontrunners for the Reform Party nomination. Though many believed Bowman would win the slot on Hagelin's ticket as the candidate for Vice President of the United States, he ultimately lost it to Nat Goldhaber.

In 2004, Bowman attempted another run at the Presidency, but ultimately endorsed John Kerry. In 2005, he toured the United States at the invitation of friends honoring him for his efforts towards peace, viewing it as a sort of "farewell tour" due to his battle with a form of Non-Hodgkin lymphoma.

In 2006, Bowman collected signatures to get on the ballot as a Democrat for the U.S. Representative seat for the Florida's 15th congressional district, then held by Republican Dave Weldon. Democrat Timothy A. Shipe filed, but did not qualify. Shipe was not known to the Brevard County, Florida Democratic party whereas Bowman had been working with them. In September 2006, Dr. Bowman won the Democratic Primary election, and became the official Democratic candidate running against the Republican incumbent in November 2006.

An article by Florida Today noted Bowman had about $6,000 campaign money compared to Weldon's $559,858. By the end of September, the difference in campaign money had grown to Bowman's $21,944 versus Weldon's $673,321. As of October 31, there had been no debate scheduled between the two. Following the election, "With all 314 precincts reporting, the vote was: Weldon 125,596 Bowman 97,947"

In October, 2008 Dr. Bowman endorsed the Congressional campaign of Dr. Kevin Barrett. Barrett got 2 percent of the vote in his Congressional district.

== Awards ==
- The President's Medal of Veterans for Peace

== Bibliography ==
- "Arms Control in Space: Preserving Critical Strategic Space Systems without Weapons in Space" in America's Plans for Space (1984)
- "Proposal for a Deep Freeze" in Patricia M. Mische, Star Wars and the State of Our Souls (1984) ISBN 0-86683-450-8
- Star Wars: Defense or Death Star? (1985) LoC 85-82136 OCLC 13943536
- Star Wars: A Defense Insider's Case Against the Strategic Defense Initiative (1986) ISBN 0-87477-390-3 ISBN 0-87477-377-6 (paperback)
