= Meatballs (advertisement) =

2000 US presidential election campaign political commercial

- A frame from Meatballs
- Agency: Love Advertising
- Client: Pat Buchanan 2000 presidential campaign
- Language: English
- Running time: 30 seconds
- Release date: October 9, 2000
- Directed by: David Harrison
- Production company: VTTV, Houston
- Country: United States

Meatballs (also known as Meatball and For Spanish Press 1) was a political commercial aired during the 2000 United States presidential campaign in support of Reform Party candidate Pat Buchanan. The commercial, which was created by Houston-based agency Love Advertising, depicts a white man choking on a meatball while attempting to dial 9-1-1, but keeling over before the automated menu reaches the option for English. The ad highlighted Buchanan's support for making English the official language of the United States and his opposition to immigration policies of the time. Some analyses questioned the accuracy of the ad's claim that Buchanan's opponents were "writing off English for good".

The ad aired in 22 states, with an emphasis by the campaign on border states like California and Arizona. The commercial drew criticism from several political figures and media outlets for its message, which some considered racist and xenophobic. Some critics praised the ad's humor and execution. The ad has been criticized in retrospect.

== Background ==
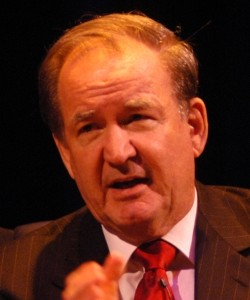
Pat Buchanan, the Reform Party nominee for president in 2000, made immigration a central issue of his campaign.

In the 2000 United States presidential election, former Republican Pat Buchanan sought, and ultimately received, the nomination of Ross Perot’s Reform Party. Buchanan’s campaign themes included opposition to the North American Free Trade Agreement, illegal immigration, and abortion rights. Because of the Reform Party’s showing in the 1996 presidential election, with Perot garnering eight percent of the national popular vote, the party qualified for matching federal campaign funds in 2000. Following a court ruling, Buchanan was awarded $12.6 million in such funds. A stated goal of the campaign was to again attain at least five percent of the national popular vote, so that the Reform Party would maintain its eligibility for matching funds in the 2004 election.

During his campaign, Buchanan and his running-mate, educator and activist Ezola Foster, both frequently called for a reduction in the number of immigrants allowed into America each year, as well as increased assimilation (in both language and culture) of those who enter the country. In a May 2000 interview with National Public Radio, Buchanan claimed that immigration at then current rates was "rapidly changing the nature of the entire country; we speak 300 languages", while in August of that year, his campaign website called for a reduction of legal immigrants to between 250,000 and 300,000 annually, as well as for an implementation of an assimilation program to teach them the English language as well as American customs and history. Foster, meanwhile, had supported California's Proposition 187 in 1994, which sought to deny public services to illegal immigrants, and in her acceptance speech as Buchanan's running-mate in August, urged American immigration policy to "stop being stupid", claiming that illegal immigration had lowered educational quality at the school where she had taught. That month, President Bill Clinton also signed Executive Order 13166, ordering federal agencies to work to accommodate non-English-speaking citizens; the move was regarded as an inspiration for what would become Buchanan's first general-election commercial.

For their first television commercial of the general election campaign, funded partly by the federal matching funds, Buchanan's campaign hired Love Advertising, an agency based in Houston, Texas. Its owner, Brenda Love, reported that her agency had been chosen because Buchanan "wanted a fresh approach" and an agency which would pursue an unconventional media and creative strategy. Buchanan's national campaign finance chairman connected the campaign to Love. The agency's creative director, David Harrison, oversaw the ad. The commercial itself was filmed by Houston-based production company VTTV. Both Love Advertising and VTTV received criticism from some of their clients and Houston commentators for their involvement in an ad perceived to have "anti-Hispanic overtones".

== Synopsis ==
The 30-second TV spot opens with a middle-aged white man sitting in his kitchen, eating a meal of spaghetti and meatballs while watching the news on TV. A newscaster announces that an executive order "say[s] that English is no longer America’s national language". Upon hearing this, the man begins choking on his meatball. However, upon dialing 9-1-1, he has to wait through a recorded menu stating which number to dial for each language, including Spanish, Bengali, Swedish, and Swahili. A voice-over asks "Do you ever miss English? Immigration is out of control". The narrator adds that George W. Bush, the Republican presidential nominee, and Al Gore, the Democratic presidential nominee, "are writing off English for good." Before the recorded menu reaches the option for English, the choking man has fallen, "lifeless", to his kitchen floor. At the end of the ad, the viewer sees the man's dog standing on his stomach, licking the food off his face.

== Analysis ==
The ad's "choking" plot has been interpreted as a metaphor for the idea that immigration will eventually "choke America to death". The Houston Press suggested that the subtext of the ad is that real Americans speak English. The ad's allusion to an executive order deeming English not to be America's official language was regarded as a reference to Executive Order 13166. Regarding the ad's message, Buchanan himself argued that one of the greatest threats to America was its potential to "dissolve" into demographic and cultural subgroups (such as race and language). He further alleged that the Democratic and Republican parties were unwilling to substantively discuss the issues of immigration and English, in spite of voters’ interest in the issue, out of interest in political correctness.

The accuracy of the ad's central claim — that Bush and Gore were not committed to protecting the English language — was questioned in some analyses. In his book Winning Elections: Political Campaign Management, Strategy & Tactics, author John Franzen noted that neither Bush nor Gore had expressed support for removing English's status as America's national language. Franzen concluded that the ad was "very funny", but unethical. Similarly, CBS News deemed the claim that both Gore and Bush "are writing off English for good" to be "a stretch", although noting that both candidates had voiced their opposition to establishing English as the United States' official language.

== Release ==
On October 9, 2000, the commercial began airing in 22 states, including California and Arizona, using a portion of the federal matching funds which the campaign received. It became the first general-election campaign TV ad released by any presidential candidate that year. The ad aired primarily on cable television and during, among other programs, WWF Smackdown. The ad was given particular emphasis in California, airing in every major media market in the state, with a focus on news programs.

CBS News suggested that Buchanan targeted California and Arizona in particular because those two states included many voters who lived near illegal immigrants and supported more government action to combat illegal immigration. Buchanan indicated that he believed the issue would carry relevance for California voters, telling SFGate that, although the issue was not top of mind for many voters, it "still resonates", also citing Proposition 187 as evidence of the issue's continuing resonance. The ad was also aired in Maryland and Iowa media markets, particularly in areas with many immigrant workers. Although it was produced by a Houston-based advertising agency, and the Buchanan campaign ran radio ads in the Houston area, the commercial was not initially aired in any Texas media markets; it was suggested that the ad's perceived anti-Hispanic message would alienate voters in the state.

== Reception ==
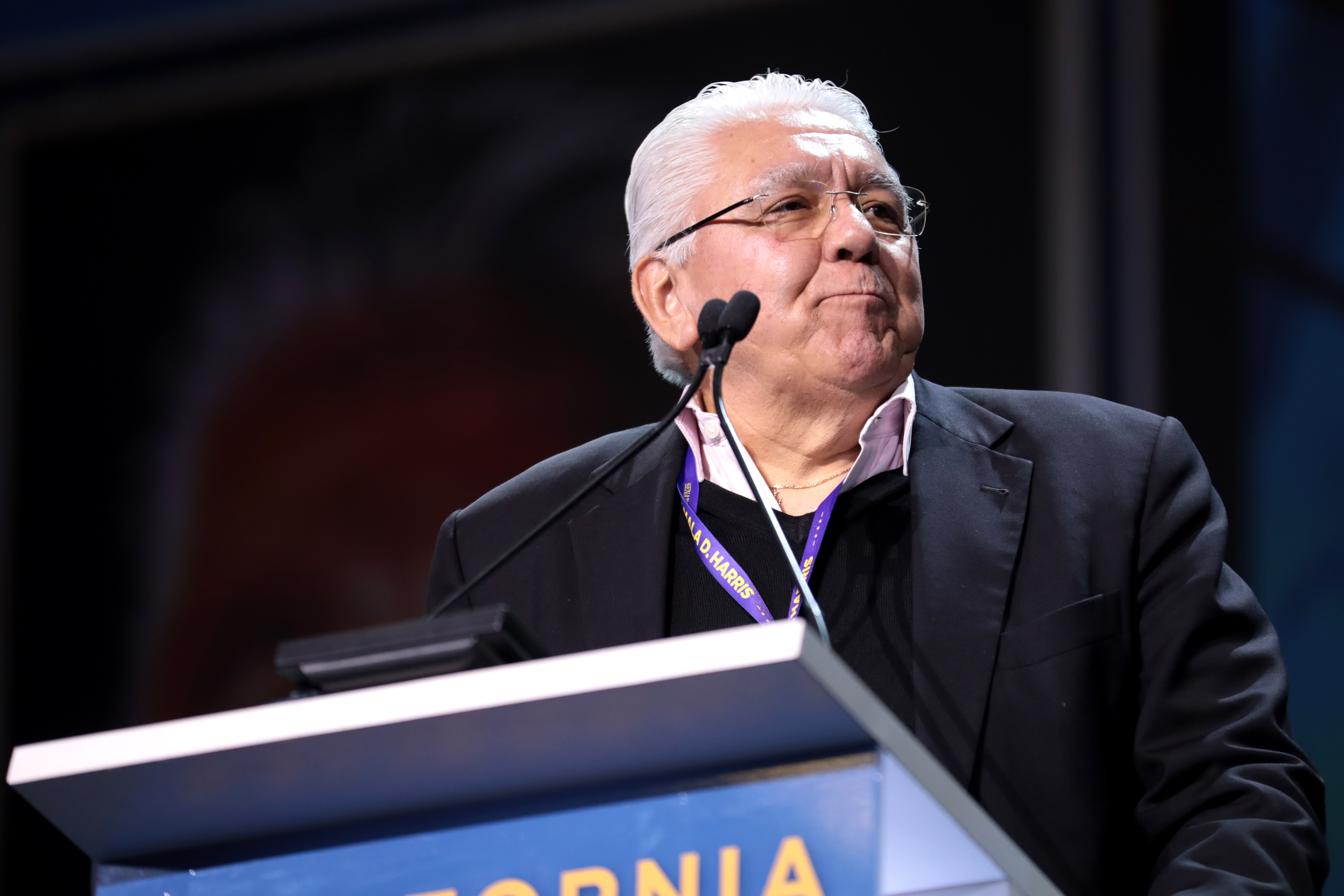
Art Torres, then the California Democratic Party chairman, was among the political figures who accused the ad of "fear mongering."

=== Political figures ===
The commercial drew criticism from some political figures. California Democratic Party Chairman Art Torres attacked the ad as "pathetic" and called for its condemnation. Torres continued that "English will always be our national language and no amount of fear mongering or clicking of the heels will change that". A spokesman for the California Republican Party concurred, opining that the ad demonstrated Buchanan's lack of understanding of California communities and voters. The deputy vice chair for Latino advocacy organization National Council of La Raza, Lisa Navarrette, remarked that "There is a reason Pat Buchanan is getting 1% of the vote", while the national policy director for the League of United Latin American Citizens voiced concern that the ad could stoke anger and violence towards immigrants. In an interview with The Washington Post, Peter Fenn, a Democratic strategist, singled out Meatballs as his choice for the worst commercial of the 2000 campaign. A profile of Buchanan in the Washington Examiner deemed the ad "hyperbolic" and questioned the political saliency of illegal immigration as a campaign issue, citing a Gallup Poll indicating that the issue ranked twelfth in importance to voters.

=== Critics ===
Upon its release, the ad was reviewed by professional advertising critics at several media outlets. A review for Slate, published upon the ad's release as part of the publication's ongoing "Ad Report Card" feature, gave the commercial a letter grade of "D", criticizing its premise as "ludicrous" and highlighting a number of perceived non-sequiturs in the ad, such as the ad's use of a food — spaghetti — associated with immigrants. The review went on to note that if the man were actually choking, then he might not have been able to speak to a 9-1-1 operator even if he had reached the English option in time. Slate also proposed that another moral of the ad might be that "a foreign-food-loving social deviant got what was coming to him". A review by Dan Snierson, writing for Entertainment Weekly, gave the ad a letter grade of "B" for execution and "no comment" for its message. In response to the ad's claim that "immigration is out of control", Snierson quipped that "Yeah, that’s not the only thing".

Writing for Ad Age, Bob Garfield deemed the ad "sort of funny, after a fashion" to its target audience, but also denounced the ad's message as being "inherently jingoistic, intolerant, divisive and [...] racist". Garfield also observed that, whereas "extremists" running for public office often attempt to hide behind a respectable facade and use code words to convey their ideas, Buchanan's ad does not.

== Aftermath ==
The Globe and Mail described the Meatballs ad as the sole point in the campaign that Buchanan's campaign received attention, owing to the widespread backlash and condemnation directed at the spot. Prior to the release of the spot, Buchanan was polling at around one percent in most polls; by the end of the campaign, following the release of Meatballs and a string of other campaign ads, Buchanan was continuing to poll at one percent, far behind Ralph Nader, a fellow third-party candidate who had spent far less money on political advertising. Buchanan's later ads would continue to focus on issues of concern to local audiences, such as "Culture War – Boy Scouts", an ad aired in Vermont (where same-sex civil unions had recently been legalized) in which he defended the Boy Scouts for prohibiting openly gay men from being scout leaders.

In 2001, The American Prospect columnist Dave Denison retrospectively deemed Meatballs one of the two "cheapest and sleaziest" political commercials of the 2000 campaign, while in 2015, Salon ranked the ad at number eight on its list of the "10 of the most fear-mongering political ads in American history", with writer Kali Holloway calling the ad "ridiculous." In a 2012 retrospective on "the greatest dystopian campaign ads of the last 50 years" for Slate, commentator David Weigel included "Meatballs" and gave it an "Apocalypse Rating" of 3 out of 10, commenting that "As stupid as the ad was, there’s still a constituency that fears this".

== See also ==
- Pat Buchanan 2000 presidential campaign
- 2000 United States presidential election
- English-only movement
- Fearmongering
