= Pork meatball =

Pork meatball may refer to:

- Lion's head (food)
- Pork ball
