= Iowa Straw Poll =

Iowa Straw Poll may refer to:

- Iowa State Fair Straw Poll, also sometimes referred to as Iowa Straw Poll; first conducted in 2015
- Iowa Straw Poll (1979–2011), sponsored by the Iowa Republican Party and conducted from 1979 to 2011
