= Catherine Brown =

Catherine Brown (or similar) may refer to:

== Arts and entertainment ==
- Catherine Brown, Miss Colorado 1978
- Catherine Brown, Miss Wyoming 2011
- Catherine Madox Brown (1850–1927), artist and model associated with the Pre-Raphaelites
- Katharine Brown (born 1987), Miss Scotland 2009 and Miss United Kingdom 2010
- Kathy Brown (born 1970), American R&B, dance, and house singer
- Kathryn Brown, British art historian
- Katie Brown (TV personality) (born 1963), American home and gardening TV show host, author, and art historian
- Kitty Brown (1899–after 1990), American blues singer
- Cath Brown (artist) (1933–2004), New Zealand master weaver

== Sportspeople ==
- Catherine Brown (footballer) (born 1994), Australian footballer
- Cathy Brown (boxer) (born 1970), British ex-professional boxer
- Katherine Brown (cricketer) (born 1953), English cricketer
- Katie Brown (climber) (born 1981), American rock climber
- Catherine Gibson (1931–2013), married surname Brown, Scottish swimmer

== Politicians ==
- Kate Brown (born 1960), governor of the State of Oregon, 2015–2023
- Kathleen Brown (born 1945), American attorney and politician from California
- Cathy Gordon Brown (born 1965), independent candidate for president of the United States, 2000
- Katherine Whelan Brown (1872–1942), member of the New Jersey General Assembly
- Cathrynn Brown, member of the New Mexico House of Representatives

== Academics ==
- Katheryn Russell-Brown (born 1961), professor of law at University of Florida's Fredric G. Levin College of Law
- Katrina Brown (born 1960), professor of development studies at the University of East Anglia
- Kate Brown (professor) (born 1965), professor at Massachusetts Institute of Technology
- Kate Robson Brown, British anthropologist
- Katherine Brown (psychologist), British psychologist
- Kathryn Brown (climate policy advisor), British scientist

== Others ==
- Catharine Brown (Cherokee teacher) (c. 1800–1823), Cherokee woman and missionary teacher
- Catherine Brown (food writer) (1941–2024), Scottish food writer and historian
- Kate Brown (plaintiff) (1840–1883), United States Senate employee and African American civil rights activist
- Katie Brown, fictional character in Calamity Jane
- Katherine 'Kath' Brown, character in Harry Brown (film)
- Kate Louise Brown (1857–1921), American children's educator and author
- Kate Moore Brown (1871–1945), American musician, clubwoman and traveler
- Catherine Swan Brown Spear (1813–1903), married name Brown, American reformer, educator, and abolitionist

== See also ==
- Kathleen Browne (1878–1943), Irish politician, farmer, writer, historian and archaeologist
- Kathie Browne (1930–2003), American film and television actress
- Kathleen Brown (disambiguation)
