= Cathy Brown =

Cathy Brown may refer to:

- Cathy Gordon Brown (born 1965), independent candidate for President of the United States in the United States presidential election, 2000
- Cathy Brown (boxer) (born 1970), British boxer

== See also ==
- Kathy Brown (born 1960), American singer
- Catherine Brown (disambiguation)
