= Kathleen Brown (disambiguation) =

Kathleen Brown or Browne could refer to:

- Kathleen Brown (born 1945), American politician, member of the Brown political family of California
- Kathleen M. Brown, American historian
- Kathleen Margaret Brown, Northern Irish Anglican priest
- Kathleen Browne (1876–1943), Irish politician
- Kathleen Browne (artist) (1905–2007), New Zealander-English artist
- Kathleen Campbell-Brown (1903–1996), Australian university lecturer

== See also ==
- Catherine Brown (disambiguation)
- Kathie Browne (1930–2003), American actress
