= Third-party and independent candidates for the 2000 United States presidential election =

- November 7, 2000
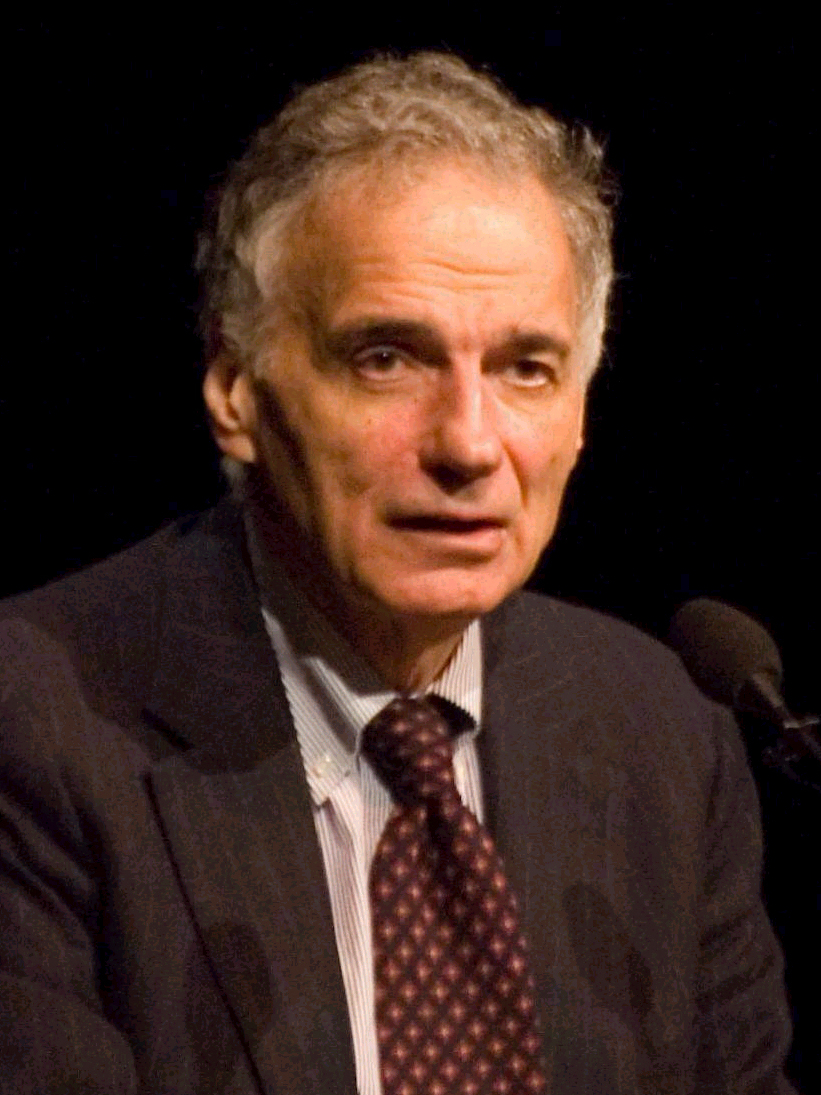

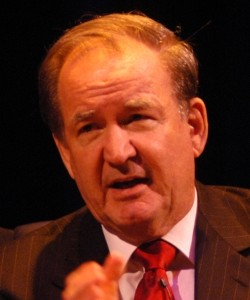

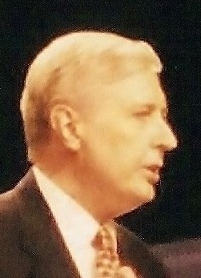

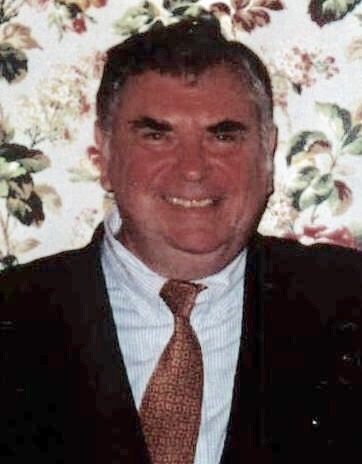

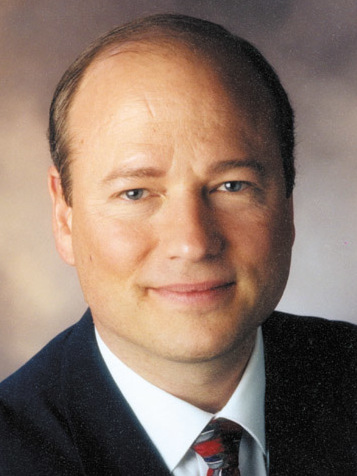

Nominee	Ralph Nader	Pat Buchanan	Harry Browne
Party	Green	Reform	Libertarian
Home state	Connecticut	Virginia	Tennessee
Running mate	Winona LaDuke	Ezola Foster	Art Olivier
Popular vote	2,882,955	448,895	384,431
Percentage	2.74%	0.43%	0.36%
Nominee	Howard Phillips	John Hagelin	James E. Harris
Party	Constitution	Natural Law	Socialist Workers
Home state	Virginia	Iowa	Georgia
Running mate	Curtis Frazier	Nat Goldhaber	Margaret Trowe
Popular vote	98,020	83,714	7,378
Percentage	0.09%	0.08%	0.01%

This article contains lists of official third party or independent candidates associated with the 2000 United States presidential election.

Third party is a term commonly used in the United States to refer to political parties other than the two major parties, the Democratic Party and Republican Party. The term is used as innumerate shorthand for all such parties, or sometimes only the largest of them.

An independent candidate is one who runs for office with no formal party affiliation.

Candidates who received, or ran for, the presidential nomination of a political party other than that of the two major parties in the 2000 presidential election, as well those who ran as independents, are listed below.

== Ballot access to 270 or more electoral votes ==
Vote totals on ballots representing 270 electoral votes. All other candidates were on the ballots of fewer than 10 states, 100 electors, and less than 20% of voters nationwide.

Presidential ticket	Party	Ballot access			Votes	Percentage
Presidential ticket	Party	States	Electors	% of voters	Votes	Percentage
Browne / Olivier	Libertarian	49 + DC	530	98.4%	384,431	0.36%
Buchanan / Foster	Reform	49	517	95.8%	448,895	0.43%
Nader / LaDuke	Green	43 + DC	481	90.5%	2,882,955	2.74%
Phillips / Frazier	Constitution	41	409	76.1%	98,020	0.09%
Hagelin / Goldhaber	Natural Law	38	391	73.2%	83,714	0.08%

=== Green Party ===
==== Nominee ====
Ralph Nader	Main article: Ralph Nader 2000 presidential campaign The 2000 presidential campaign of Ralph Nader, political activist, author, lecturer and attorney, began on February 21, 2000. He cited "a crisis of democracy" as motivation to run. He ran in the 2000 United States presidential election as the nominee of the Green Party. He was also nominated by the Vermont Progressive Party and the United Citizens Party of South Carolina. The campaign marked Nader's second presidential bid as the Green nominee, and his third overall, having run as a write-in campaign in 1992 and a passive campaign on the Green ballot line in 1996.

==== Withdrawn candidates ====
- Jello Biafra, Activist from California
- Stephen Gaskin, Activist from Tennessee
- Joel Kovel, Scholar from New York

=== Reform Party ===
==== Nominee ====
Pat Buchanan	Main article: Pat Buchanan 2000 presidential campaign The 2000 presidential campaign of Pat Buchanan, conservative pundit and advisor to both President Richard Nixon and Ronald Reagan, was formally launched on March 2, 1999, as Buchanan announced his intention to seek the Republican Party nomination for the presidency of the United States in the 2000 presidential election. It marked Buchanan's third primary campaign for the presidency, following his bids in 1992 and 1996. Although he had not attained the nomination either time, he had been regarded as a consequential party figure. Early primary surveys found Buchanan polling in the single digits and following the publication of his book A Republic, Not an Empire, which generally advocated for noninterventionist and "America first" foreign policy, some within the Republican Party condemned Buchanan's foreign policy views. There began to be speculation that Buchanan would leave the Republican Party in favor of the Reform Party, a third party qualified for matching federal campaign funds.

==== Withdrawn candidates ====
- Donald Trump, Businessman from New York
- John B. Anderson, Former United States Representative from Illinois
- John Hagelin, Leader of the Transcendental Meditation movement from Iowa
- George D. Weber, Former state Representative from Missouri

=== Libertarian Party ===
==== Nominee ====
Harry Browne	Main article: Harry Browne 2000 presidential campaign The 2000 presidential campaign of Harry Browne, investment banker and 1996 nominee of the Libertarian Party, was formally launched on February 14, 2000, as Browne announced his intention to seek the Libertarian Party nomination for the presidency of the United States in the 2000 presidential election. Browne gained the Libertarian nomination on the first convention ballot becoming the first person to win the party's nomination twice and Art Olivier, former mayor of Bellflower, California, was nominated as his vice president.

==== Withdrawn candidates ====
- Don Gorman, Former state Representative from New Hampshire

=== Constitution Party ===
==== Nominee ====
Howard Phillips	In the 2000 U.S. presidential election, Phillips received 98,020 votes for 0.1% of the total vote and a sixth-place finish.

==== Withdrawn candidates ====
- Herbert Titus, Attorney from Virginia

=== Natural Law Party ===
==== Nominee ====
John Hagelin	Main article: Natural Law Party (United States) § 2000 In 2000, Hagelin created an independent coalition between the Natural Law and the Reform Party. The coalition failed when Patrick Buchanan took control of the Reform Party. On March 31, 2000, the Federal Election Commission certified primary season matching funds for John Hagelin, who was seeking the nomination of the Natural Law and Reform Parties. Hagelin was the second minor party presidential candidate to qualify; the first was Pat Buchanan. Ralph Nader eventually qualified as well. According to the Federal Election Commission, the NLP spent $2.3 million on its presidential campaign in the 1999–2000 election cycle. Following Hagelin's and the Natural Law Party's failed attempt at a coalition with the Reform Party in 2000, the Natural Law Party ran its own ticket of Hagelin and Nat Goldhaber. The pair appeared on 38 ballots and received 83,702 votes or 0.1% of the total. This poor finish led Maharishi Mahesh Yogi to stop endorsing the Party and very few members renewed their membership in 2001.

== Ballot access to fewer than 270, but more than 50 electoral votes ==
=== Socialist Workers Party ===
==== Nominee ====
James E. Harris	Main article: James Harris (Socialist Workers Party politician) § Biography Harris once again ran for president in 2000 with Margaret Trowe as his running mate. In the state of Florida, Harris was initially rewarded 9,888 votes in Volusia County despite winning a total of just above 500 statewide. After requesting a recount he was found to have only received 8 votes, a "computer disk glitch" was described as the cause.

=== Socialist Party ===
==== Nominee ====
David McReynolds	Main article: David McReynolds § Socialist Party USA McReynolds was given the party's presidential nomination again during the 2000 election. After the 2000 election, the Palm Beach Post speculated that the vast majority of the 2,908 voters who had voided their votes by punching the names of both McReynolds and Democratic candidate Al Gore on a "confusing butterfly ballot" (and also of the over 3,000 more who punched both Gore and Buchanan) had meant to vote for Gore and that mistaken voting on the Palm Beach County butterfly ballot had consequently cost Gore the state's crucial electoral votes, and therefore the election as a whole.

=== Workers World Party ===
==== Nominee ====
Monica Moorehead	Main article: Monica Moorehead § Biography A political activist since high school, Moorehead distributed newspapers for the Black Panther Party and subsequently joined the WWP in 1972. She rose to the national leadership in 1979. In 1996, Moorehead was the presidential nominee of the party. She appeared on the ballot in 12 states and received around 29,000 votes, 0.3 percent of all cast, the best-ever showing for a WWP candidate in a presidential election. In 2000 she received 4,795 votes; that year she was only on the ballot in Florida, Rhode Island, Washington, and Wisconsin. On both occasions, her vice-presidential running-mate was Gloria La Riva.

== Ballot access to fewer than 50 electoral votes ==
=== Libertarian Party of Arizona ===
==== Nominee ====
L. Neil Smith	Main article: L. Neil Smith § Politics Although Browne was chosen by the party's 2000 national convention, Smith, because of a dispute between the Libertarian Party's national organization and its Arizona affiliate, appeared as the Libertarian Party candidate for president on the Arizona ballot. He and running mate Vin Suprynowicz received 5,775 votes in the national election, less than 0.01% of the vote. Shortly thereafter, Smith's supporters announced a new 1,000,000-signature petition drive; however, in late 2003, with the new drive once again failing to achieve even a small fraction of that total, Smith announced that he would not pursue another political office.

=== Prohibition Party ===
==== Nominee ====
Earl Dodge	Main article: Earl Dodge § Presidential From June 28 to 30, 1999, around thirty delegates attended the national convention in Bird-in-Hand, Pennsylvania, and nine voted to give Dodge the presidential nomination against eight voting for Gary R. Van Horn and the vice-presidential nomination to W. Dean Watkins. He attempted to win the Independent American Party presidential nomination to receive ballot access in Utah, but was defeated by U.S. Taxpayers' Party presidential nominee Howard Phillips and in the general election he only appeared on the ballot in Colorado and received 208 votes.

=== Independent candidates ===
==== Cathy Gordon Brown ====
Cathy Gordon Brown	Main article: Cathy Gordon Brown Cathy Gordon Brown was an Independent candidate for President of the United States in the 2000 United States presidential election, with ballot access only in her home state of Tennessee where she received 1,606 votes, which was more than either third party candidates Howard Phillips (Constitution Party) and John Hagelin (Natural Law Party), or fellow Tennessee independent Randall Venson received. Brown's running mate was Sabrina R. Allen. On 20/20 Downtown, she stated she "always wanted to be the first woman president."

== Gallery ==
2000 United States presidential election results by county, shaded according to percentage of the vote for Green candidate Ralph Nader

Vote percentage received by Pat Buchanan in the 2000 US presidential election by state or territory
