= Authors' Club =

British membership organisation

Coordinates: 51.5061°N 0.1238°W

- Formation: 1891; 135 years ago
- Founder: Walter Besant
- Headquarters: London, England
- Location: 1 Whitehall Place, London SW1
- President: John Walsh
- Website: www.authorsclub.co.uk

The Authors' Club is a British membership organisation established as a place where writers could meet and talk. It was founded by the novelist and critic Walter Besant in 1891. It is headquartered at the National Liberal Club.

The Authors' Club was based for many years next door to its present site, on Whitehall Court, first moving into the National Liberal Club in 1966. After ten years there, in 1976 the Authors' Club joined forces with The Arts Club in Dover Street, London W1. In 2011 it moved to Blacks, a Grade II* listed building by John Meard in Dean Street, Soho – a house that was once home to a club run by Samuel Johnson and Thomas Gainsborough – where it remained for three years. It has now returned to its old home in the National Liberal Club. The Club welcomes both men and women as members, and is open to all those "professionally engaged with literature".

It was at a dinner at the Authors' Club that Oscar Wilde denounced the censorship of his play Salome. "Casting aside all his gifts of humour and irony the angry Irish poet poured out his sense of assault and battery committed upon himself and laid his spirit bare and bruised before us. Having finished he did not sit down again but swept from the company still overwhelmed by the weight of his wrongs."

Three Poets Laureate – Alfred Austin, John Masefield and John Betjeman – have graced its ranks, while guest speakers included Émile Zola, Mark Twain, Rudyard Kipling, Frances Hodgson Burnett, Winston Churchill, Bram Stoker, TS Eliot and Clement Attlee. Arthur Conan Doyle was for many years chairman, and often used to read his manuscripts to members prior to publication.

The first president of the Authors' Club was the novelist George Meredith; he was followed by Thomas Hardy; who was in turn succeeded by J. M. Barrie. Subsequent presidents included the architectural historian Sir Banister Fletcher, the Anglo-Irish writer, dramatist and poet Lord Dunsany, Compton Mackenzie – author of Whisky Galore – and Laurence Meynell. The current president is the author and The Independent columnist John Walsh.

== Awards ==
The Club holds literary lunches and dinners. It hosts two literary awards each year: the Authors' Club First Novel Award, and the Banister Fletcher Award for the best book on art or architecture.

== Notable members ==
=== Past members ===
- Arnold Bennett
- Kate Louise Brown
- Ford Madox Ford
- C. S. Forester
- Graham Greene
- Archibald Grimke
- H. Rider Haggard
- E. W. Hornung
- Michael Jacobs
- Jerome K. Jerome
- Malcolm Muggeridge
- Barry Pain
- Kim Philby
- Anthony Powell
- Ameen Rihani
- Ernest Shackleton
- W. W. Skeat
- G. M. Trevelyan
- H. G. Wells
- Thornton Wilder
- Harold Wilson
- Francis Younghusband
- Israel Zangwill
- Frank R. Stockton

=== Present members ===
- Amanda Craig
- William Dalrymple
- Rachel Lichtenstein
- Deborah Moggach
- Nicola Monaghan
- Andrew O'Hagan
- Vikram Seth
- Miranda Seymour
- Sunny Singh
