= Independent politician =

Individual not affiliated with any political party

An independent or non-affiliated politician (typically associated with the label "IND") is a politician not formally affiliated with any political party. In accordance with the applicable electoral law which regulates electoral process in a representative democracy, such non-affiliated politicians are not nominated by political parties, but most commonly by a qualified number of citizens, thus becoming independent candidates, or civic candidates. As in the case of party-candidates, an independent electoral candidacy can be individual (a single independent candidate for a single-seat electoral unit), or collective (electoral list of independent candidates for a multi-seat electoral unit).

Politicians may also become independents after losing or repudiating affiliation with a political party. Independents sometimes choose to form a party, alliance, or technical group with other independents, and may formally register that organization. Even where the word "independent" is used, such alliances can have much in common with a political party, especially if there is an organization which needs to approve the "independent" candidates.

There are various reasons why someone may stand for office as an independent. Some independent politicians disagree with the idea or concept of political parties; viewing them as politically corrupt. Others may have political views that do not align with the platforms of any political party and therefore they choose not to affiliate with them. Some independent politicians may not be associated with a party, perhaps as former members of it or else have views that align with it, but choose not to stand in its name, or are unable to do so because the party in question has selected another candidate. Others may belong to or support a political party at the national level but believe they should not formally represent it (and thus be subject to its policies) at another level. In some cases, a politician may be a member of an unregistered party and therefore officially recognised as an independent.

== Africa ==
=== Algeria ===
The current president of Algeria, Abdelmadjid Tebboune, presented himself as an independent candidate during the 2019 presidential election campaign. However, he remained a member of the central committee of the National Liberation Front (Algeria) of which he has been a member since the 1970s. Nadir Larbaoui, who was the prime minister of Algeria until 2025, is also an independent.

=== Libya ===
During the rule of Muammar Gaddafi, most political parties were banned; Gaddafi himself did not belong to any party. After his fall, political parties began to form but still do not have a major role in Libyan society.

=== Namibia ===
In the 2020 Namibian local and regional elections, independent politicians won four seats.

=== Tunisia ===
The President of Tunisia Kais Saied was elected in 2019 and re-elected in 2024 by presenting himself as an independent. The heads of government Hichem Mechichi, Najla Bouden, Ahmed Hachani and Kamel Madouri also lack any official political affiliation.

== Americas ==
=== Brazil ===
Independent politicians are not allowed to run for office in Brazil. The Constitution of 1988, in Article 14, §3rd, item V, says that "Are conditions for eligibility: V - party affiliation". However, the Proposal Amendment to the Constitution (PEC) no. 6/2015, authored by independent senator José Reguffe, would allow the independent candidacy of individuals who have the support of at least 1% of the electors able to vote in the region (city, state or country, depending on the election) in which the candidate is running. Currently, members of the legislature can leave their respective parties after being elected, as in the case of senator Reguffe, who left the Democratic Labour Party (PDT) in 2016. Jair Bolsonaro was independent between 2019 and 2021.

=== Canada ===
==== Federal politics ====
In Canadian federal politics, members of both the House of Commons and the Senate are permitted to hold office without being members of a political party. Candidates in federal elections who are not affiliated with a party have two options: independent or no affiliation. In the former case, they appear on the ballot with "Independent" following their name; in the second case, they appear with their name only. The two options are otherwise equivalent.

===== House of Commons =====
During the earliest Canadian Parliaments, a lack of coherent political identity among both the Liberal and Conservative parties is known to have led to Members of Parliament (MPs) occasionally demonstrating independence from their party by voting in line with the opposition. Commonly, the issues which caused these MPs to act independently were religious in nature. These tensions began to disperse over the course of the first ten Canadian parliaments as the major political parties began to form consistent identities and MPs began affiliating themselves with the parties they knew more closely shared their core values. This in turn increased cohesion between parties and MPs, and minimized the causes and motivations for MPs to act independently.

Many observers of the Canadian House of Commons in the 21st century have noted its incredibly high party discipline. Few MPs choose to vote against their party's official stance on any given piece of legislation. Between 2011 and 2013—the first two years of the 41st Canadian Parliament, following the 2011 Canadian federal election—the elected members of the governing Conservative Party voted as a unified group on 76% of all votes, while members of the Liberal Party did so on 90% of all votes, and members of the New Democratic Party (NDP) did so on 100% of votes. This unity further increased in subsequent years, as in the 42nd Parliament, following the 2015 election, the governing Liberal MPs voted identically on 99.6% of all votes, Conservative MPs on 99.5% of votes, and NDP MPs on 99.8% of votes. (Conservatives, Liberals, and NDP were the only three parties with enough MPs to qualify for official party status in the 41st and 42nd parliaments.) Thanks to this strong party discipline, it is uncommon to see politicians who are otherwise affiliated with any of the main political parties act independently of their party.

Though it is acceptable and accepted for politicians to serve as independent MPs, those who attempt to run as such often struggle to be elected without access to the resources of the major parties. As a result, there are seldom more than one or two independent MPs within modern Canadian Parliaments, with many who do sit as such being initially elected as a part of a major party before either leaving voluntarily or being removed. In the first year of the 44th Canadian Parliament, the House of Commons featured one sitting independent member: Kevin Vuong, from the Ontario electoral district, or riding, of Spadina—Fort York. Vuong had originally campaigned as a member of the Liberal Party during the 2021 federal election but was ejected from the party two days prior to the end of the vote due to controversy surrounding past allegations of sexual assault. Despite his removal from the Liberal Party, Vuong won the election for his riding and chose to take his seat as an independent, though this decision was met with controversy because many voters had not known that the Liberals had expelled him before casting their votes. In 2022, Alain Rayes, MP for the Quebec riding of Richmond—Arthabaska, resigned from the Conservative caucus to sit as an independent, becoming the second independent MP of the 44th Parliament.

Independent politicians have on occasion held considerable sway in the House of Commons of Canada in recent years, as Canada has been governed by successive minority governments (five of the seven that have been formed since the 2004 federal election) with independent MPs sometimes sharing in the balance of power.

- In 2004, Chuck Cadman was elected to the House as an independent MP representing the British Columbia riding of Surrey North. Cadman was first elected to represent the riding as a Reform member in the 1997 federal election and re-elected as a member of the Canadian Alliance, Reform's successor party, in the 2000 federal election. He sought the nomination for the Conservative Party (re-created in 2003 when the Alliance and Progressive Conservatives merged) for the 2004 election but was unsuccessful. Having retained his seat with 43% of the vote in 2004, he died in office in 2005.
- Independent André Arthur was elected in the Quebec riding of Portneuf—Jacques-Cartier in the 2006 federal election with 39% of the vote. He was the only independent to win a seat in that election; he was re-elected in the 2008 federal election with 33% of the vote. Arthur lost his seat in 2011.
- Bill Casey, the MP for the Nova Scotia riding of Cumberland—Colchester—Musquoduboit Valley, was expelled from the Conservative Party for voting against the 2007 budget. He also served as an independent, then ran as such in 2008 and retained his seat with 69% of the vote. Casey resigned from the Commons in 2009 but made a comeback in the same riding, now named Cumberland—Colchester, when he was elected as a Liberal in 2015. He sat in the House for the 42nd Parliament and did not seek re-election in 2019.
- In 2019, MP Jody Wilson-Raybould ran as an independent candidate in the riding of Vancouver Granville after being expelled from cabinet and the Liberal Party over the SNC-Lavalin affair. She was returned to Parliament with 32% of the vote. After sitting as an independent for the 43rd Parliament, Wilson-Raybould did not seek re-election in 2021.

===== Senate =====
While traditionally framed as an "independent body of sober second thought", appointments to the Senate of Canada prior to 2016 were commonly seen as highly partisan, with the majority of Canadian senators identifying themselves as members of either the Liberal or Conservative parties and serving within their party's caucus. As these have been the only two parties to ever form government in Canada, only the Liberal and Conservative parties had been able to appoint new senators. Because Canadian senators are appointed by the Governor General of Canada on the advice of the Prime Minister rather than being elected, senators were often accused of being appointed as a "reward" for service to the party in power, and once appointed, of simply repeating the points and positions of their counterparts in the House of Commons rather than acting as a means of truly independent policy review.

In 2014, as a response to growing public disapproval of the Senate and the perceived problems brought about by senator partisanship, Liberal Party leader Justin Trudeau made the decision to expel all Liberal senators from the Liberal Party caucus. Trudeau would go on to call for an overall elimination of partisanship in the Senate and pledged to end the practice of partisan appointments for senators and transition to a new system of merit-based appointments if elected prime minister.

Following the election of a Liberal majority government in 2015, the Independent Advisory Board for Senate Appointments was established with the goal of filling Senate vacancies through a selection process based on political knowledge, merit, and perceived ability to act independently of partisan affiliation. This push to remove partisan ties from the Senate resulted in the creation of the Independent Senators Group, a coalition of both newly appointed independent senators and formally partisan senators who had relinquished their formal party ties, alongside the also independent Canadian Senators Group and Progressive Senate Group.

By 2018, the majority of Canadian Senators were officially independent, though some Liberal senators continued to remain affiliated with the political party despite no longer being permitted within the party caucus. Additionally, the Conservative Party elected not to remove its senators from the party caucus, and many Conservative Party senators kept their official partisan affiliations in public. During the 2019 federal election campaign, in response to reporters' questions, Conservative Party leader Andrew Scheer said that if his party were elected to form government and he became prime minister, he would reinstate the practice of partisan appointments to the Senate.

The efforts to increase senatorial independence have led some to argue the Senate has developed an increase of importance and power in the legislative process. As of 2021, it was found that Canadian senators were facing increasing pressure from lobbying groups on a variety of issues, suggesting the more independent Senate has a greater perceived influence over legislative issues. Additionally, following the appointment of senators through the Independent Advisory Board for Senate Appointments, there has been a noted increase in the number of amendments the Senate has proposed for legislation from the House of Commons. During the 42nd Parliament (2015–2019), the Senate attempted to amend 13 government bills, whereas during the 41st Parliament (2011–2015), it had attempted to amend only one government bill. The reformed Senate is noted as having proposed amendments on at least 20% of all legislation.

====== Criticism ======
Several observers and those involved with the Senate itself have criticized the Trudeau government for its attempted reforms, with most accusations centering around the belief that the new appointment process is biased towards those who are ideologically supportive of the Liberal Party's objectives. Remaining Conservative senators have accused the Independent Senators Group in particular as being "too quick to endorse bills from the Liberal government".

Supporting this claim, a 2021 study found that members of the Independent Senators Group voted in favor of legislation proposed by the incumbent Liberal government more consistently than any other group within the Senate, including those still formally aligned to the Liberal Party. This was, however, among an overall trend in which all senators demonstrated lower levels of party loyalty, and as such its full implications are still unknown. The report also concluded that partisanship in Senate appointments was undeniably down when compared to the Senate prior to the reforms. It is generally thought that it will only be possible to judge the success of the attempted reforms accurately when a non-Liberal government is elected to the House of Commons, at which point it can be observed if the noted trend in voting represents simple loyalty to the government, or loyalty to the Liberal Party.

==== Provincial and territorial politics ====
The territorial legislatures of the Northwest Territories and Nunavut are consensus governments with no political parties. All members sit as independents. There are a few independent members of the other provincial and territorial legislatures, which are similar in principle to the federal House of Commons; for example, in the 2009 British Columbia general election, independent candidate Vicki Huntington narrowly defeated incumbent Attorney General Wally Oppal in Delta South. In the 2019 Newfoundland and Labrador general election, two independent candidates were elected.

=== Costa Rica ===
Current laws in Costa Rica do not permit a citizen to run directly for any elected position as an independent without the representation of a political party. Any nomination must be made through a political party, due to the framework of the current legal system, in which the political parties have a monopoly on the nomination of candidates for elected positions according to the Electoral Code.

However, becoming an independent politician after being elected is protected by virtue of Article 25 of the Constitution of Costa Rica, which guarantees freedom of association; therefore, any citizen cannot be forced to remain in a specific political party and can join any other political group. It is common in each legislative period for some deputies (diputados, term used for legislators) of the Legislative Assembly of Costa Rica to become independents; this has also happened with the mayors (alcaldes) of the municipalities of cantons.

=== Mexico ===
Jaime Heliodoro Rodríguez Calderón (born in 1957), sometimes referred to by his nickname "Bronco", is a Mexican politician and former governor for the northern state of Nuevo León and holds no political party affiliation. As of June 7, 2015, he was elected Governor of Nuevo León, making history as the first independent candidate to win in the country.

=== United States ===
==== President ====
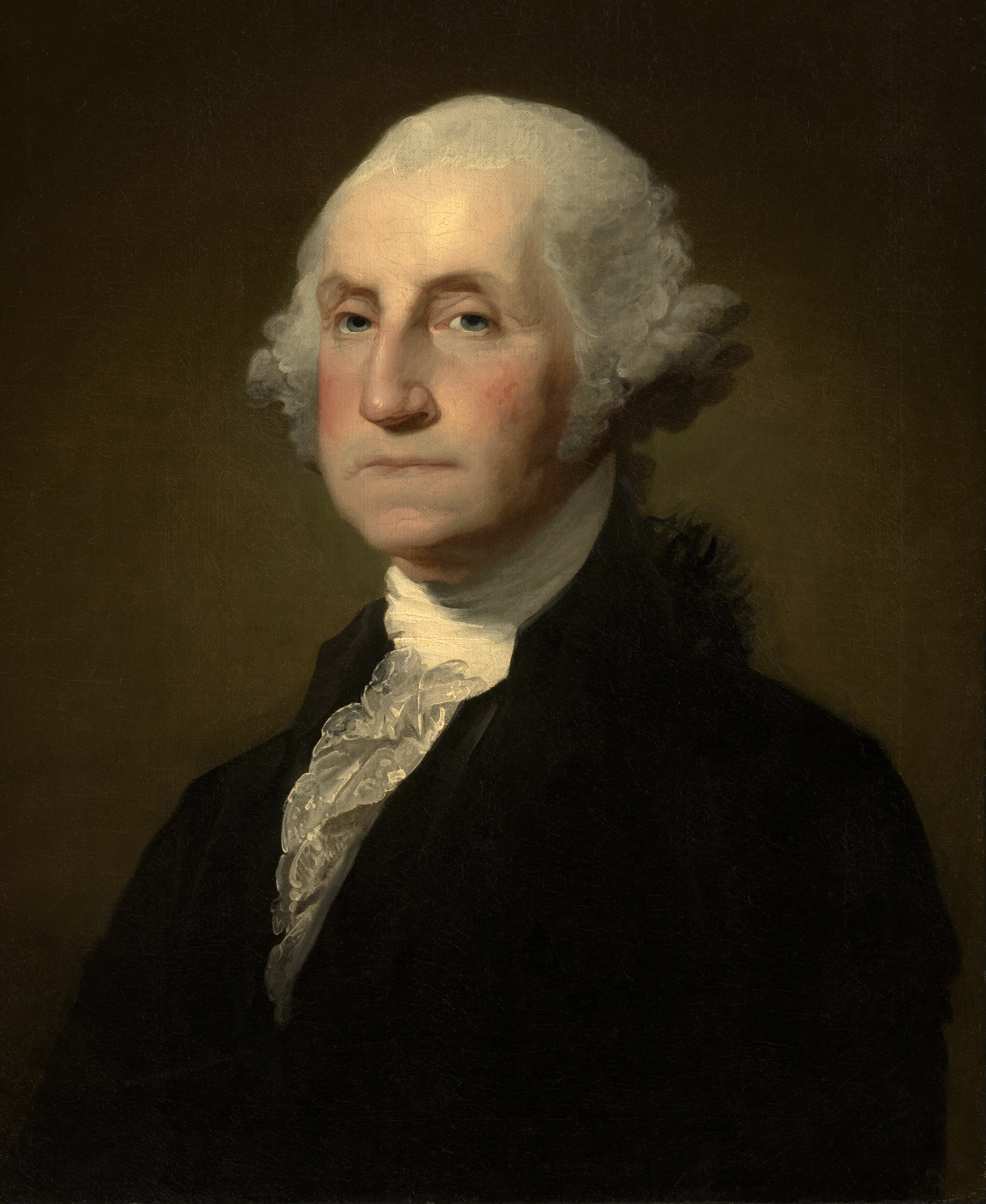
George Washington, the first president of the United States, was an independent politician.

George Washington was the only U.S. president elected as an independent to date. Washington opposed the development of political parties, which had begun to solidify as the Federalist faction, centered around John Adams and Alexander Hamilton, and the Democratic-Republican faction, centered around Thomas Jefferson and James Madison. Washington feared that partisanship would eventually destroy the country, and famously warned against "the baneful effects of the spirit of party" in his 1796 Farewell Address.

John Tyler was expelled from the Whig Party in September 1841, and mostly remained an independent for the remainder of his presidency. He later briefly sought election in 1844 under the Tyler Party, but withdrew over fear he would split the vote and give the election to Whig candidate Henry Clay.

Since 1900, candidates running as independents for U.S. president have included congressman John Anderson in 1980, billionaire entrepreneur Ross Perot in 1992 and 1996 (in 1996 under the newly founded Reform Party), former Green Party candidate Ralph Nader in the 1996 and 2000 elections, and "Never Trump" conservative candidate Evan McMullin in 2016. Out of all independent candidates since Washington, Perot performed the best, gaining no votes in the Electoral College but receiving 19 percent of the popular vote and, early in the election season, leading in polls against his opponents Bill Clinton and George H. W. Bush. Additionally, McMullin received 21 percent of the popular vote in his home state of Utah but received little support from the remainder of the country. Independent senator Bernie Sanders ran in the 2016 and 2020 Democratic Party presidential primaries, but ultimately did not appear on the ballot in either the 2016 nor 2020 presidential elections, though he did receive more than 5% of the popular vote as a write-in candidate in his home state of Vermont.

In 2008, Nader formed Independent Parties in New Mexico, Delaware, and elsewhere to gain ballot access in several states. In 2024, Robert F. Kennedy Jr. created "We the People" parties in several states for the same purpose, even though he is Independent.

Several other candidates for federal races, including Joe Lieberman (who created Connecticut for Lieberman), have pursued a similar strategy.

==== Governor ====
Illinois, Maine, Oregon, Rhode Island, Texas, Alaska, and North Dakota have elected formally independent candidates as governor: Illinois's first two governors, Shadrach Bond in 1818 and Edward Coles in 1822; James B. Longley in 1974 as well as Angus King in 1994 and 1998 from Maine; Lincoln Chafee in 2010 from Rhode Island; Julius Meier in 1930 from Oregon; Sam Houston in 1859 from Texas; and Bill Walker in 2014 from Alaska. Lowell P. Weicker Jr. of Connecticut is sometimes mentioned as an independent governor, though this is not technically correct; he ran for A Connecticut Party, which gave him better ballot placement than an unaffiliated candidate would receive, defeating the Democratic and Republican nominees. Another former governor who is sometimes mentioned as an independent is Jesse Ventura, who actually ran as a member of the Reform Party's Minnesota affiliate, which later disaffiliated from the party and reverted to its original name, the Independence Party of Minnesota. North Dakota elected William Langer as Governor in 1932 as a member of the Republican/Nonpartisan League. He was later elected Governor in 1936 for the NPL.

In 1971, State Senator Henry Howell of Virginia, a former Democrat, was elected lieutenant governor as an independent. Two years later, he campaigned for governor as an independent but lost by 15,000 votes.

There were several unsuccessful independent gubernatorial candidates in 2006 who affected their electoral races. In Maine, state legislator Barbara Merrill, formerly a Democrat, received 21% of the vote. In Texas, country music singer and mystery novelist Kinky Friedman received 12.43% of the vote, and State Comptroller Carole Keeton Strayhorn received 18.13%. Strayhorn's and Friedman's presence in the race resulted in a splitting of the ballot four ways between themselves and the two major parties.

In 2010, Florida governor Charlie Crist left the Republicans and became an independent. (He later became a Democrat.) He left the Republicans because he did not want to run against former state house Speaker Marco Rubio in the Republican primary for the U.S. Senate election, preferring to run in the general election instead. Rubio won the election, though Crist came in ahead of Democratic nominee Kendrick Meek.

In 2014, former Honolulu mayor Mufi Hannemann ran as an independent candidate for the governorship of the State of Hawaii after previously campaigning in the state's Democratic primary. As a result, Democratic candidate David Ige was elected as governor with a plurality of 49%. Also in 2014, former mayor of Valdez, Bill Walker won Alaska's gubernatorial election. Walker retired before the 2018 election but ran again in 2022. He did not win but received 20% of the vote.

==== Congress ====
===== House of Representatives =====
The United States House of Representatives has also seen a handful of independent members. Examples include Bernie Sanders of Vermont, Virgil Goode of Virginia, Frazier Reams of Ohio, Victor Berger of Wisconsin, Justin Amash, Paul Mitchell of Michigan, and Kevin Kiley of California.

===== Senate =====
There have been several independents elected to the United States Senate throughout history. Notable examples include David Davis of Illinois (a former Republican) in the 19th century, and Harry F. Byrd Jr. of Virginia (who had been elected to his first term as a Democrat) in the 20th century. Some officials have been elected as members of a party but became independent while in office (without being elected as such), such as Wayne Morse of Oregon, who left the Republican party to become an independent, then joined the Democratic Party two years later. Nebraska senator George W. Norris was elected for four terms as a Republican before changing to an independent after the Republicans lost their majority in Congress in 1930. Norris won re-election as an independent in 1936, but later lost his final re-election attempt to Republican Kenneth S. Wherry in 1942.

====== Since 2000 ======
Vermont senator Jim Jeffords left the Republican Party to become an independent in 2001. Jeffords's change of party status was especially significant because it shifted the Senate composition from 50 to 50 between the Republicans and Democrats (with a Republican Vice President, Dick Cheney, who would presumably break all ties in favor of the Republicans), to 49 Republicans, 50 Democrats, and one Independent. Jeffords agreed to vote for Democratic control of the Senate in exchange for being appointed chairman of the Senate Environment and Public Works Committee, and the Democrats held control of the Senate until the 2002 elections, when the Republicans regained their majority. Jeffords retired at the end of his term in 2007. Dean Barkley of the Independence Party of Minnesota was appointed a day before the 2002 elections to fill the senate seat of Paul Wellstone who, while running for re-election, died weeks prior. Barkley refused to caucus with either party.

In 2006, independent politician Bernie Sanders won the Senate seat vacated by the retiring Jim Jeffords as an independent and was reelected in 2012, 2018 and 2024. He was an independent member of the United States House of Representatives for Vermont-at-large from 1991 to 2007. Sanders is the longest-serving independent member of Congress in American history. Also in 2006, Joe Lieberman was a former Democrat and ran under a third party (Connecticut for Lieberman Party) after he lost the primary. After the election, Lieberman enrolled himself as an Independent Democrat until his retirement in 2013. In 2006, Sanders and Lieberman were the only two victorious independent candidates for Congress, both caucusing with the Democrats. In 2012, Angus King was elected to the U.S. Senate as an Independent from Maine. He was reelected in 2018 and won a third term in 2024.

During the presidency of Joe Biden, former members of Democratic Party Kyrsten Sinema and Joe Manchin joined Sanders and King and became Independent Democrats. They are viewed as moderate Democrats or Conservative Democrats, and cited increasing partisanship to explain their decisions. After they changed their affiliations, the Senate had the highest number of independents in a single Congress since the ratification of the 17th Amendment.

State and local independent politicians

Independent politicians have also played notable roles at the state and local levels, often finding success in contexts where party affiliation is less dominant or elections are nonpartisan.

Mayors and municipal leaders

There have been many cases where independent candidates have made a large impact on elections and have even won, particularly in large cities. For instance, former New York City mayor Michael Bloomberg served as 2002 to 2013 as a Republican but for his third term he won as an independent. Independent politicians have also led cities like Minneapolis, where Charles Stenvig served as an independent mayor throughout the 1970s. These leaders often emphasize pragmatic governance over party ideology, appealing to diverse voter bases.

State legislatures

While less common than in Congress, independents occasionally serve in state legislatures. Maine and Alaska, in particular, have seen a history of independent state legislators. For example, in the Alaska State House, independents have sometimes played pivotal roles in coalition governments, demonstrating their influence in closely divided chambers. These legislators often prioritize regional or policy-specific issues over strict adherence to party platforms.

Judicial and nonpartisan offices

Many state and local offices, particularly in the judiciary, are officially nonpartisan, providing opportunities for independents to succeed. For example, state superintendents of schools or city council members are normally politicians who identify as independent or with no party at all. This system allows voters to focus on the candidate's qualifications rather than party affiliation since this should not be stressed for these positions.

==== Losers of Primary elections ====
In the United States the loser of a primary election can run as an independent or represent another political party in the general election only in the states of Connecticut and New York (which are currently the only states where Electoral fusion is legal and common). While in all other states this practice is either effectively or explicitly banned under sore loser laws (though sometimes they may still run as a write-in candidate). Examples of elections where this has occurred include the 2025 New York City mayoral election, 2021 Buffalo mayoral election, and the 2006 United States Senate election in Connecticut.

== Asia ==
=== China ===
==== Hong Kong ====
Around half of Hong Kong's Legislative Council is made up of independents, or members whose political groups are represented by one sole member in the legislature. They are common in functional constituencies, and are not rare among geographical constituencies.

=== India ===
Independent candidates can contest elections on the basis of their personal appeal or to promote an ideology different from any party. In the 2024 general election, seven independent candidates were elected to Lok Sabha, the lower house of the Parliament of India.

=== Malaysia ===
Independents have rarely been elected to the Dewan Rakyat and state legislative assemblies. In Malaysian elections, many independent candidates lose their election deposit because they had failed to secure at least 12.5% or one-eighth of the total votes cast. Since senators in Malaysia are only appointed with the guidance of the prime minister by either the King of Malaysia or the respective state assemblies, independent senators are quite rare, with most of them being technocrats or niche experts whose function is to serve a ministry.

In 2010, a group of independent MPs who were sacked from the People's Justice Party formed a political block called Konsensus Bebas. The members were Zahrain Mohamed Hashim (Bayan Baru), Wee Choo Keong (Wangsa Maju), Zulkifli Noordin (Kulim-Bandar Bharu), Tan Tee Beng (Nibong Tebal) and Mohsin Fadzli Samsuri (Bagan Serai). It did not last beyond the 12th General Elections.

As of May 2018, three independent MPs were elected in GE14, but later joined Pakatan Harapan (PKR), thus causing no representation for independent MP for that time. However, as of June 2018 and December 2018, the number increased to 13 independent Members of Parliament that sat in the Dewan Rakyat as of December 2018. At the same time in December 2018, almost all members from Sabah UMNO quit the party and became independent politicians.

==== Dewan Negara (Senate) ====
===== Senators =====
1. Mohd Na'im Mokhtar – appointed by the Yang di-Pertuan Agong
2. Amir Hamzah Azizan – appointed by the Yang di-Pertuan Agong
3. Zulkifli Hasan – appointed by the Yang di-Pertuan Agong
4. Salehuddin Saidin – appointed by the Yang di-Pertuan Agong
5. Marhamah Rosli – appointed by the Yang di-Pertuan Agong
6. Low Kian Chuan – appointed by the Yang di-Pertuan Agong
7. Awang Sariyan – appointed by the Yang di-Pertuan Agong

==== Dewan Rakyat (House of Representatives) ====
===== Members of Parliament of the 15th Malaysian Parliament =====
State	No.	Parliament constituency	Member
Kelantan	P029	Machang	Wan Ahmad Fayhsal
Kelantan	P030	Jeli	Zahari Kechik
Kelantan	P032	Gua Musang	Mohd Azizi Abu Naim
Penang	P042	Tasek Gelugor	Wan Saiful Wan Jan
Perak	P054	Gerik	Fathul Huzir Ayob
Perak	P056	Larut	Hamzah Zainudin
Perak	P059	Bukit Gantang	Syed Abu Hussin Hafiz Syed Abdul Fasal
Perak	P061	Padang Rengas	Azahari Hasan
Perak	P067	Kuala Kangsar	Iskandar Dzulkarnain Abdul Khalid
Pahang	P082	Indera Mahkota	Saifuddin Abdullah
Selangor	P095	Tanjong Karang	Zulkafperi Hanapi
Labuan	P166	Labuan	Suhaili Abdul Rahman
Sabah	P167	Kudat	Verdon Bahanda
Sabah	P181	Tenom	Riduan Rubin
Total	Kelantan (3), Penang (1), Perak (5), Pahang (1), Selangor (1), Labuan (1), Sabah (2)		

==== Malaysian State Assembly Representatives ====
Kedah State Legislative Assembly

2 / 36

Kelantan State Legislative Assembly

1 / 45

Pahang State Legislative Assembly

1 / 47

Selangor State Legislative Assembly

1 / 56

Sabah State Legislative Assembly

6 / 73

Sarawak State Legislative Assembly

1 / 82

State	No.	Parliamentary constituency	No.	State constituency	Member
Kedah	P009	Alor Setar	N12	Suka Menanti	Dzowahir Ab Ghani
Kedah	P011	Pendang	N19	Sungai Tiang	Abdul Razak Khamis
Kelantan	P024	Ketereh	N25	Kok Lanas	Mohamed Farid Zawawi
Perak	P073	Pasir Salak	N49	Sungai Manik	Zainol Fadzi Paharudin
Pahang	—			Nominated member	Ahmad Irshadi Abdullah
Selangor	P109	Kapar	N44	Selat Klang	Abdul Rashid Asari
Melaka	P139	Jasin	N24	Bemban	Mohd Yadzil Yaakub
Sabah	P168	Kota Marudu	N06	Bandau	Maijol Mahap
Sabah	P169	Kota Belud	N08	Pintasan	Fairuz Renddan
Sabah	P173	Putatan	N23	Petagas	Awang Ahmad Sah Awang Sahari
Sabah	P182	Pensiangan	N44	Tulid	Jordan Jude Ellron
Sabah	P171	Kalabakan	N70	Kukusan	Rina Jainal
Sabah	—			Nominated member	Roger Chin Ken Fong
Sarawak	P195	Bandar Kuching	N11	Batu Lintang	See Chee How
Total	Kedah (2), Kelantan (1), Perak (1), Pahang (1), Selangor (1), Melaka (1), Sabah (6), Sarawak (1)				

=== North Korea ===
Parliamentary independent candidates: The system in place whether the DPRK allows for independent politicians to launch their own campaigns to gain a seat in parliament. The candidates however must be approved by the Fatherland Front, being the primary party of the DPRK. To cast votes to independent candidates the voting population must do so at independent voting stations.

Nearly all electoral systems currently in practice in the DPRK that exist on a local level are made up of mostly independent Candidates, as the Fatherland Front and other major party's primarily operate in the urban heartland of the DPRK. On the local level of North Korean elections, alliances between independent candidates is banned.

=== Nepal ===
In Nepal, there are some independent politicians, especially in local government. Independent politician and rapper Balen Shah was elected as Mayor of Kathmandu in 2022. Similarly, Harka Sampang and Gopal Hamal were also elected as Mayor of some of the major cities like Dharan and Dhangadhi, respectively.

=== Pakistan ===
Pakistan has independent politicians standing in elections. In the 2008 Pakistani general election, 30 independent members of parliament were elected to Pakistan's parliament. In 2011, four candidates won seats in the National Assembly. In the 2013 General Election, nine seats were won by independents. In 2024, Pakistan Tehreek-e-Insaf backed independent candidates won 94 seats as the party was officially banned by the Election Commission of Pakistan.

=== Philippines ===
Independents in elections since 1946
Year	President	Vice president	Senate	House
1946	None	None	None	5 / 98
1947	—N/a	—N/a	None	—N/a
1949	None	None	0 / 8	1 / 100
1951	—N/a	—N/a	0 / 8	—N/a
1953	Lost	None	0 / 8	1 / 102
1955	—N/a	—N/a	0 / 8	—N/a
1957	None	None	0 / 8	0 / 102
1959	—N/a	—N/a	0 / 8	—N/a
1961	Lost	Lost	0 / 8	1 / 104
1963	—N/a	—N/a	0 / 8	—N/a
1965	Lost	None	0 / 8	3 / 104
1967	—N/a	—N/a	1 / 8	—N/a
1969	Lost	None	None	2 / 110
1971	—N/a	—N/a	None	—N/a
1978	—N/a	—N/a	—N/a	1 / 190
1981	Lost	—N/a	—N/a	—N/a
1984	—N/a	—N/a	—N/a	6 / 200
1986	None	None	—N/a	—N/a
1987	—N/a	—N/a	0 / 24	23 / 214
1992	None	None	0 / 24	6 / 216
1995	—N/a	—N/a	1 / 12	7 / 220
1998	Lost	None	1 / 12	7 / 220
2001	—N/a	—N/a	5 / 13	8 / 256
2004	None	Won	0 / 12	4 / 261
2007	—N/a	—N/a	1 / 12	4 / 271
2010	Lost	None	1 / 12	7 / 286
2013	—N/a	—N/a	2 / 12	6 / 293
2016	None	Lost	3 / 12	4 / 297
2019	—N/a	—N/a	1 / 12	2 / 304
2022	Lost	None	4 / 12	6 / 316
2025	—N/a	—N/a	2 / 12	11 / 317

Ever since the first elections during the 1907 Philippine Assembly elections, independents have been allowed to participate and have won seats. On that first election, independents had the most members, behind the Nacionalista Party. When the Senate was first created, its first elections in 1916 also saw independents participating and winning one seat. In the Nacionalista landslide of 1941, the three independents were the only non-members of the Nacionalista Party to win in the House of Representatives; this was also the start of independents being shut out in the Senate.

After independence was granted by the United States in 1946, the two-party system between the Nacionalistas and Liberal Party was established, with certain candidates who failed to get the nomination of either parties appearing on the ballot as "Independent Nacionalista" or "Independent Liberal", as the case may be. Independents not associated with any party were still able to participate and sporadically win elections. In the 1961 Philippine vice-presidential election, independent Sergio Osmeña Jr. narrowly lost to Emmanuel Pelaez. The first breakthrough was in the 1967 Philippine Senate election where Magnolia Antonino, widow of Gaudencio Antonino who died on election eve, won.

Ferdinand Marcos declared martial law in 1972, dissolved Congress, and promulgated a new constitution that led to the 1978 Philippine parliamentary election, where one independent won, independents also won in 1984. Marcos was overthrown after the 1986 People Power Revolution after he allegedly cheated in the 1986 Philippine presidential election. Corazon Aquino succeeded Marcos, and promulgated a new constitution that ushered in a multi-party system. Here, parties are not able to present full 12-person slates in Senate elections, thus necessitating inter-party cooperation, that included independents. The 1995 Philippine Senate election saw two independents winning: Juan Ponce Enrile (who later ran and lost the 1998 Philippine presidential election as an independent) and Gregorio Honasan, who both teamed up to stage coups during the Aquino presidency. The 2001 EDSA Revolution increased the number of major candidates running as independents, with broadcaster Noli de Castro topping the Senate election. He was a guest candidate of the opposition Pwersa ng Masa coalition but he never joined their campaign rallies. In 2004, he ran as vice president as a guest candidate of the administration K-4 coalition and won with just under majority of the vote.

In the local level, former priest Eddie Panlilio was elected as governor of Pampanga in 2007, defeating two administration candidates. When Panlilio eventually transferred to the Liberal Party in time for the 2010 election, it was ruled that he was beaten in the 2007 election; in 2010, he was defeated.

In the 2010 House of Representatives elections, seven independents were elected, although all but two joined a political party after the elections. Independents can only run in district elections, and cannot participate in party-list elections as independents.

In contesting elections, independent candidates can spend as much as those with parties can under the law, but they are not able to tap in spending from a political party that nominated them.

Independent candidates are different from nonpartisan politicians; the former are elected in openly partisan elections, while the latter participate in nonpartisan elections such as barangay elections. Local legislatures may find itself with independent and nonpartisan members.

=== Qatar ===
In Qatar, political parties are banned by law. All elected officials are independent.

=== Singapore ===
Under the constitution of Singapore, an independent politician refers to a person who is currently not affiliated with any political party or bureaucratic association at the time of the election. In the case of Group Representation Constituency contests, a team must comprise members of the same political party or entirely independent candidates. This role also applies to the elected Nominated Members of Parliament and the President, both of which carries a nonpartisanship role.

=== Taiwan ===
After the 2018 Taiwanese local elections, there was only one independent local head: Ko Wen-je, mayor of Taipei.

On 6 August 2019, Ko Wen-je founded the Taiwan People's Party.

After the 2022 Taiwanese local elections, there was one independent local head: Chung Tung-chin, County magistrate of Miaoli County.

== Europe ==
=== Azerbaijan ===
In Azerbaijan, there are many independent members of the National Assembly, such as Aytən Mustafayeva.

=== Bulgaria ===
The President of Bulgaria Rumen Radev is an independent with support from the Bulgarian Socialist Party. Radev was elected in the 2016 presidential election. An independent politician can enter into parliament only if they gather enough votes to pass the 4% threshold, thus behaving like political parties. However, they can be part of a civic quota of a given party. Civic quotas are lists of independents candidates, who are represented on a given party's electoral list, without directly joining the party. Every party has the capability to invite independent candidates into their lists, without forcing them to join the party itself.

=== Croatia ===
After an inconclusive election in 2015, Tihomir Orešković was named the first non-partisan Prime Minister of Croatia.

=== Estonia ===
All Estonian presidents are forced to relinquish membership from any political party they may be in.

=== Finland ===
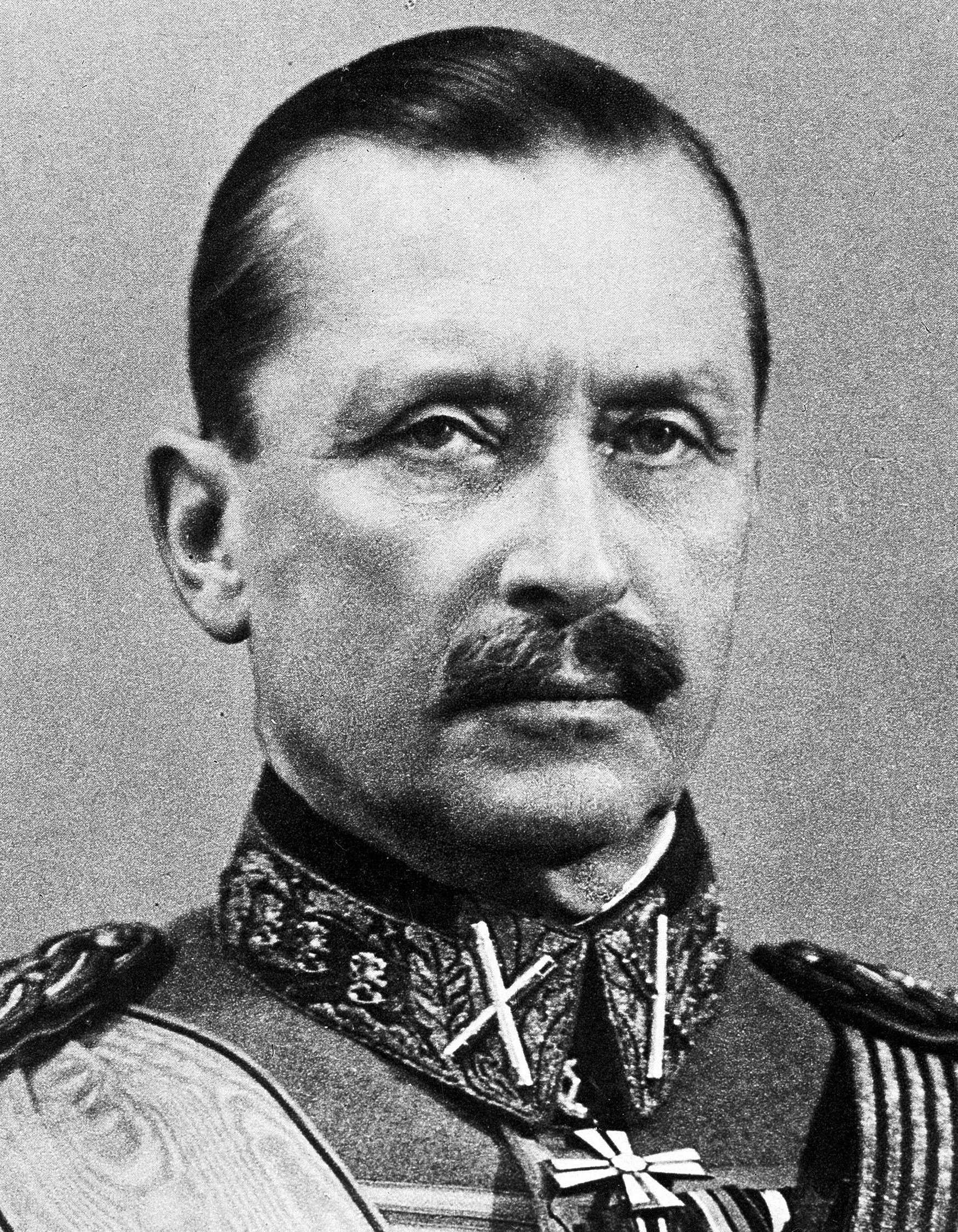
Marshal Mannerheim, the 6th president of Finland

Marshal C. G. E. Mannerheim, who served as the president of Finland from 1944 to 1946, did not want to be affiliated with any party. As the state regent/caretaker from December 1918 to July 1919, Mannerheim also stood as an independent in the July 1919 presidential election against the National Progressive's candidate Kaarlo Juho Ståhlberg, who won.

Also, after serving six years on his first term as the 12th president of Finland in the National Coalition Party from 2012 to 2018, Sauli Niinistö was elected for his second term in 2018 after running as an independent candidate. Sauli Niinistö's status as an independent/non-partisan president has been attributed to his historical approval ratings and popularity, which stood at 90% favorable in July 2021 of which 52% said that Niinistö had handled the presidency "Very favorably".

=== France ===
In France, independent politicians are frequently categorised as sans étiquette ("without label") in municipal or district elections.

In the nineteenth century and first half of the twentieth century, most French national politicians were independents. The first modern French political parties date from the early 1900s (foundation of Action Libérale and the Radical Party). The first legislation on political parties dates from 1911, though it was not until 1928 that parliamentarians were required to select a political party for the parliamentary register (either by formally joining a group, or by loosely working with one as an apparenté, or associate), and not until after 1945 that structured political parties came to dominate parliamentary work.

Once elected, independents tended to attach themselves to a parliamentary party. In some cases independent deputies banded together to form a technical group of their own. In 1932, for instance, there were four technical groups created: the left-of-centre Independent Left, with 12 deputies; the centre-right liberal Independents of the Left, with 26 deputies; the right-wing agrarian Independents for Economic, Social and Peasant Action, with six deputies; and the far-right monarchist Independent Group, with 12 deputies—these four technical groups thus accounted for one-tenth of deputies. In addition, the larger parliamentary parties, including the socialist SFIO, centre-left PRRRS, centre-right ARD and conservative FR all included a greater or lesser number of independents who sat with their group for parliamentary work (apparentés).

In 1920, Alexandre Millerand was elected president of the Republic under the banner "without label".

However, it is nowadays rare to have independent politicians at national level, if only because independents usually affiliate themselves to an existing political grouping. Noteworthy independents include José Bové in the 2007 presidential election. Emmanuel Macron was an independent politician as Minister, but formed his own party to stand in the 2017 presidential election.

From 2001 to 2008, "without label" was no longer used in the nomenclature of the Ministry of the Interior. Candidates and lists presenting themselves as "without label" are classified in DVG (various left), DVD (various right), DVC (various center) or AUT (other) according to their political sensitivity. Therefore, from 2008 onwards, the DIV (miscellaneous) or the LDIV code for the "miscellaneous" list has been created to group unclassifiable or categorical interests and, by default, mayors without a declared label claiming no political sensitivity, be it left, center or right. The AUT (other) grade replaces the DIV grade without changing its definition.

=== Georgia ===
Salome Zourabichvili won the 2018 Georgian presidential election as an independent candidate, becoming the first-ever female President of Georgia.

=== Germany ===
Joachim Gauck, President of Germany from March 2012 to March 2017 and the first Federal President without party affiliation, was to date the most prominent independent politician. In the German presidential election of 2010 he was the candidate of the Social Democrats and Greens, in 2012 the candidate of all major parties except The Left. His presidency—though his powers are limited—constitutes an exception, as Independent politicians have rarely held high office in German history, at least not since World War II. It has nevertheless happened that a presidential candidate without any chances of election by the Federal Convention was not a party member: for example, in 1984 the Greens came up with the writer Luise Rinser.

In the Bundestag parliament nearly all deputies belong to a political party. The voting system of personalized proportional representation (since 1949) allows any individual holding the passive right to vote to stand for a direct mandate in the electoral districts—299 of the seats in parliament are distributed by districts according to a plurality voting system. Such a candidate has to present 200 signatures in favor of their candidacy, the same as a candidate of a party that had no parliamentary presentation previously. The first Bundestag election in 1949 saw three independents elected; since then, no party-independent candidate has won a seat. At state level, the situation is more or less the same: only party members have a real chance to be elected to a Landtag legislature, and state ministers without party membership are just as rare as at the federal level.

In local elections however it is common for independent politicians to be elected into district, city and municipal councils; sometimes independent politicians are even elected as mayor or Landrat, especially in Northern Germany. In Germany it is common to form free voters' associations to contest in local elections, often to greater success. An alliance of multiple of these voters' associations formed the Free Voters which later became a political party. The Free Voters have succeeded at entering two state parliaments directly: the Landtag of Bavaria (Free Voters of Bavaria) in 2008 and the Landtag of Rhineland-Palatinate in 2021. Another party associated with the Free Voters that made it into a state parliament was the Brandenburg United Civic Movements/Free Voters, which first entered the Landtag of Brandenburg with three seats in 2014 but lost all of its seats in 2024.

An independent member of parliament, who also is not a member of a voters' association, holds the status of fraktionsloser Abgeordneter, i.e., not affiliated to any parliamentary group. A representative who either leaves their party (and their parliamentary group) or is expelled from it and does not join another becomes fraktionslos. In 1989 the Bundestag MP Thomas Wüppesahl, who had left the Green Party in 1987 and was excluded from the Green parliamentary group the next year, obtained more rights as a fraktionsloser Abgeordneter, for example more talking time and representation in a subcommittee, when the Federal Constitutional Court decided partially in their favor.

After the German unification of 1871, the first Reich Chancellors (heads of government) de jure served as executive officers of the German Imperial states as non-partisans, usually recruited from the traditional bureaucratic, aristocratic or military elites. In the fierce political conflicts during the Weimar period after World War I, several chancellors and Reich Ministers also had no party affiliation: these chancellors were Wilhelm Cuno (1922–1923), Hans Luther (1925–1926), the former Centre politician Franz von Papen (1932), and Kurt von Schleicher (1932–1933). The last two cabinets appointed by Reich President Paul von Hindenburg, a non-partisan (though strongly Conservative) himself, were regarded as apolitical cabinets of experts with regard to the rise of the Nazi Party; many of the ministers were not party members.

Since World War II, only two ministers of (West) German cabinets have not been party members, though "on the ticket" of the major party in the coalition, the Social Democrats: Education Minister Hans Leussink (1969–1972), and Minister of Economy Werner Müller (1998–2002). Minister of Justice Klaus Kinkel only shortly after his appointment joined the Free Democrats in 1991. A special case is the former Federal Minister and Chancellor Ludwig Erhard, whose affiliation with the Christian Democratic Union (CDU) has not been conclusively established: although he served as Minister of Economics from 1949 to 1963 and as Federal Chancellor from 1963 to 1966, and was even elected CDU party chairman in 1966, it seems that he never signed a membership form or paid contributions. Researches by Der Stern magazine have revealed a record at the CDU party archives created only in 1968, with the faked date of entry of early March 1949.

=== Iceland ===
The President of Iceland (currently Halla Tómasdóttir) is independent. By convention, presidents of Iceland usually relinquish any party membership prior to or upon taking office.

=== Ireland ===
In Ireland, constituency-based proportional representation, the comparative looseness of formal parties, and strong local sentiment have meant that independents have formed a significant part of the parliamentary landscape since the foundation of the state: in the early elections to Dáil Éireann (parliament), independents accounted for 7% of seats in 1922, 8.5% in 1923, 10.5% in 1927, and 9% in 1932, though with the development of relatively more structured parties their numbers declined thereafter. These were similar proportions to the number of independents elected to other interwar European democracies such as France (see above).

It was not until the 2010s that independents would see a similar electoral success, with record scores for independents surpassing the previous interwar highs.

After the Irish general election in 2020, there were 23 independent TDs (parliamentary deputies) in the Dáil (the lower house of the Irish parliament), representing 14% of the total.

There are ten independent senators in the 26th Seanad (the upper house of the Irish parliament), representing 16% of the total. Two of these are elected by the graduates of the National University of Ireland and three from Dublin University. There is also one independent senator who was nominated by the Taoiseach and four elected by the technical panels.

=== Isle of Man ===
The majority of the elected representatives in the Isle of Man are independents.

=== Italy ===
The Prime Ministers Carlo Azeglio Ciampi (1993–1994), Lamberto Dini (1995–1996), Giuliano Amato (2000–2001), Mario Monti (2011–2013), Giuseppe Conte (2018–2021) and Mario Draghi (2021–2022) were independent when they were in office. Ciampi was also the President of Italy between 1999 and 2006. President Sergio Mattarella, despite being a former member of the Christian Democracy and of the Democratic Party, was elected president in 2015 as an independent (he was member of the Constitutional Court at the moment of his election).

=== Jersey ===
The majority of the elected representatives in Jersey are independents.

=== Kazakhstan ===
After the dissolution of the Communist Party of Kazakhstan, Nursultan Nazarbayev formally continued to lead the country as an independent politician when being elected in 1991, before later founding the Otan (later Nur Otan) party in 1999. Following the 2022 constitutional referendum, a new clause was added to Article 43(3) of the Constitution stating that, "for the period of exercising his powers, the President of the Republic of Kazakhstan shall not be a member of a political party." This reform re-established the non-partisan status of the presidency, preventing future presidents from holding party membership while in office. President Kassym-Jomart Tokayev subsequently left the Amanat party in 2022 and was re-elected later that year as an independent candidate with the support of People's Coalition. Independent presidential candidates may still receive backing from public associations, including political parties. By law, presidential candidates must be nominated by a public association, which can include parties, even if they run as independents.

Parliamentary elections in Kazakhstan have historically allowed for both party-affiliated and independent deputies. In the first post-independence elections of March 1994, independents won roughly 64 of 177 seats in the Supreme Council of Kazakhstan. The 1995 elections for the newly established Majilis allowed independent, self-nominated candidates to compete alongside party candidates, with independents winning 7 of 67 contested seats. From 2007, Majilis elections were held entirely through nationwide party-list proportional representation, preventing independent candidates from winning office. The mixed electoral system was reinstated for the 2023 elections, allowing independents to run in single-member districts while party lists continue to dominate the proportional tier.

The Senate of Kazakhstan remains non-partisan, with senators appointed by the president or elected indirectly by local assemblies, rather than through direct party-affiliated elections.

At the local level, mäslihats (regional, city, and district assemblies) also allow independent candidates to run, though recent elections have combined single-member districts and party-list proportional representation. In addition, legal reforms prohibit akims and their deputies from holding positions in party branches or representative offices, restricting formal party roles in local government.

=== Kosovo ===
Atifete Jahjaga was elected the first female and Independent President of Kosovo since the 2008 Kosovo declaration of independence. She was also the first female and independent elected leader in the whole of the Balkans.

=== Liechtenstein ===
According to the 1862 Constitution of Liechtenstein, the appointed Governor of Liechtenstein was required to be politically non-aligned with any party in both Austria and Liechtenstein. Regardless, however, no political parties existed in Liechtenstein until 1918 and all members of the Landtag of Liechtenstein were elected as independents. Under the currently used 1921 Constitution of Liechtenstein, independent candidates are allowed to run for both the Landtag and prime minister, though an independent candidate has not been elected to either position since 1921.

=== The Netherlands ===
Dick Schoof was the independent Prime Minister of the Netherlands from 2024 to 2026 when Rob Jetten was elected prime minister.

=== Poland ===
The Polish Sejm is elected by party-list ordination, which does not allow lone candidates to run, although since 2001 there has been a possibility to create a non-partisan Voters' Electoral Committee (pol. KWW, komitet wyborczy wyborców); they are by almost any means party lists, but no officially registered party is behind them. They can be unregistered parties, e.g. Kukiz'15, or non-partisan movements, although the latter never reached the 5% threshold. National minorities candidates also form Voters' Electoral Committees (like German Minority Electoral Committee, represented in Sejm between 1991 and 2023), but they do not have to reach the nationwide threshold. However, during a Sejm term many members switch parties or become independents.

Tickets such as Civic Platform during the 2001 election were formally non-partisan, Civic Platform was widely viewed as a de facto political party, as it is now.

The situation in the Senate is different, as the voting system allows independents to run as single candidates and some are elected in their own right. In the last parliamentary election (2023) four independents won seats in the Senate.

All presidents of Poland have formally been independents. Lech Wałęsa was not an endorsed candidate of any party, but the chairman of the Solidarity and he was elected without full support of the union (with some in Solidarity preferring Prime Minister Tadeusz Mazowiecki). Aleksander Kwaśniewski was a leader of the Social Democracy of the Republic of Poland, but formally resigned from the party after he was elected, as did Lech Kaczyński, who was the first leader of Law and Justice (PiS), Bronisław Komorowski (PO) and Andrzej Duda (PiS). The resignation is required because the Constitution says that the president shall hold no other offices nor discharge any public functions. The aforementioned presidents often participated in their party's campaigns (e.g. Andrzej Duda in the Law and Justice campaign three months after his resignation from the party). Karol Nawrocki, despite being endorsed by the Law and Justice party, was never a member of the party and stood as an independent candidate.

=== Portugal ===
Marcelo Rebelo de Sousa, the former president of Portugal, was elected on 24 January 2016 while being a leading member of the Social Democratic Party, but suspended his political affiliation on the day of his swearing-in.

=== Russia ===
All of Russia's presidents have been independents. Former president Dmitry Medvedev declined an offer to join United Russia, saying that he believes the President should be an independent so that he serves the interests of the country rather than his political party.

Vladimir Putin, the current president of Russia, was the head of the United Russia party until 26 May 2012, but even then was not its member, thus formally was and still is independent.

=== Sweden ===
The Swedish election system is based on parties nominating candidate MPs for their party ballots, and each party has to receive 4% or more of the national vote (or 12% in one region, which has never happened independently of also reaching the different 4% threshold). This makes running as an independent MP impossible. Once elected, the seat is personal; MPs may resign their party membership, or be stripped of it, while retaining their Riksdag seats to become independent, commonly referred to as being a politisk vilde (lit. 'political savage'), with symbol: (-).

In the Government (executive cabinet), there is no requirement for ministers to be MPs, or even have a political affiliation (though this has overwhelmingly been the case in modern times). This means that even the Prime Minister could technically be an independent if chosen by the Riksdag.

=== The United Kingdom ===
The Registration of Political Parties Act 1998 laid down the first specific rules in the United Kingdom relating to the use of the term 'independent' by election candidates. That Act was repealed with most of its contents covered by Part II of the Political Parties, Elections and Referendums Act 2000. Candidates standing for United Kingdom local elections and United Kingdom parliamentary elections, including the devolved parliaments and assemblies, can use the name of a registered political party, or the term 'Independent' (or its Welsh language equivalent annibynol) or no ballot paper description at all.

Some groups in the United Kingdom who are not affiliated to any national or regional party have registered locality-based political parties. Some English examples are the Independent Kidderminster Hospital and Health Concern, the Epsom and Ewell Residents Association, the Devizes Guardians, the Derwentside Independents, and the East Yorkshire Independents.

==== House of Commons ====
Before the twentieth century, it was fairly common for independents to be elected to the House of Commons of the United Kingdom, but there have been very few since 1945. S. O. Davies, a veteran Labour MP, held his Merthyr Tydfil seat in the 1970 general election, standing as an independent, after the Labour Party had deselected him.

Journalist Martin Bell was elected at Tatton in the general election of 1997, having stood on an anti-corruption platform, defeating incumbent Neil Hamilton. He was the first independent to be newly elected to the Commons since 1951. He stood unsuccessfully in a different constituency in 2001.

At the 2001 general election, Richard Taylor of the Independent Kidderminster Hospital and Health Concern party was elected for the constituency of Wyre Forest. Taylor was re-elected for Wyre Forest at the 2005 general election, becoming the only independent in recent times to have been elected for a second term.

Two independent (or local party) members of parliament were elected in the 2005 election, although both were defeated five years later. In the same election, Peter Law was elected as an independent at Blaenau Gwent. Law died on 25 April 2006: the resulting by-election elected Dai Davies of the local party Blaenau Gwent People's Voice. The by-election was unusual as it was the first time in over eighty years that an independent had held a seat previously occupied by another independent.

Only one independent was elected to the Commons in the 2010, 2015 and 2017 elections: Sylvia Hermon, the member for North Down, a Unionist who left the Ulster Unionist Party because of its links with the Conservatives.

There have also been several instances of politicians being elected to the Commons as representatives of a political party, then resigning the party's whip, or having it withdrawn. Examples in this in the 2010–2015 parliament included Mike Hancock (formerly a Liberal Democrat), Eric Joyce (formerly Labour) and Nadine Dorries, a Conservative who had the whip withdrawn for part of the parliament and thus sat as an independent during that time.

Independent candidates often stand in British parliamentary elections, often with platforms about specific local issues, but usually without success. An example from the 2001 general election was Aston Villa supporter Ian Robinson, who stood as an independent in the Sutton Coldfield constituency in protest at the way chairman Doug Ellis ran the football club. Another example an independent candidate, in the Salisbury constituency, is Arthur Uther Pendragon, a local activist and self-declared reincarnation of King Arthur.

Other independent candidates are associated with a political party and may be former members of it, but cannot stand under its label. For instance, for several months after being expelled from the Labour Party but before the Respect Coalition was founded, George Galloway MP described himself as "Independent Labour".

On 23 March 2005, the Independent Network was set up to support independent candidates in the forthcoming general election. The Independent Network still supports Independent candidates in local, regional, national and European elections. It has an organic set of principles which are known as the Bell Principles and are very closely related to Lord Nolan's Standards of Public Life. The Independent Network does not impose any ideology or political influence on their candidates.

In March 2009, the multi-millionaire Paul Judge established the Jury Team, an umbrella organisation dedicated to increasing the number of independent candidates standing in Britain, in both national and European elections.

In 2024, a record of six independent candidates was elected to the 59th parliament.

==== Independent and undescribed candidates ====
Part II of the Political Parties, Elections and Referendums Act 2000 allows individuals who wish to stand as a candidate to all parliaments and assemblies in the UK, including the House of Commons, the right to use one of three ballot paper descriptions. Those descriptions are the name of a registered political party; the word "independent"; or no description at all.

Unless a candidate stands as "independent" or as a "No Description" candidate leaving the ballot paper description box blank, their candidature must be confirmed by a signed certificate from the relevant officer from a registered political party, as set out in Section 52 of the Electoral Administration Act 2006.

==== House of Lords ====
The House of Lords includes many peers independent from political parties. Some are simply not affiliated with any grouping, whilst another, larger, grouping is given the official designation of crossbenchers. Additionally the Lords Spiritual (bishops of the Church of England) do not have party affiliations.

==== Scottish Parliament, Senedd (Welsh Parliament) and Northern Irish Assembly ====
In the 2003 Scottish Parliamentary elections, three MSPs were elected as Independents: Dennis Canavan (Falkirk West), Jean Turner (Strathkelvin and Bearsden) and Margo MacDonald (Lothians). In 2004 Campbell Martin (West of Scotland region) left the Scottish National Party to become an independent and in 2005 Brian Monteith (Mid Scotland and Fife) left the Conservative Party to become an independent. At the 2007 Scottish Parliamentary elections Margo MacDonald was again returned as an independent MSP and was elected as an independent for the third time four years later. She died in 2014 while still serving as member of the Parliament. As she was elected as an independent regional MSP, there could be no by-election and her seat remained vacant until the 2016 election.

Peter Law was expelled from the Labour Party after standing against an official Labour candidate in Blaenau Gwent at the 2005 UK general election and became an independent in the National Assembly and UK Parliament. In 2006 Peter Law died from a brain tumour and his wife, Trish Law, campaigned and took the seat as an independent candidate at the subsequent by-election and held onto the seat again in the 2007 Welsh Assembly elections.

In 2016, Nathan Gill as the then leader of UKIP Wales defected from the group to sit as an independent after a falling out with Neil Hamilton, who was elected UKIP Assembly group leader. Dafydd Elis-Thomas left the Plaid Cymru group later in 2016 after multiple fallings out with Plaid Cymru leader Leanne Wood. Elis-Thomas said his reason for leaving Plaid Cymru was that it not serious about working with the Welsh Labour Government. Neil McEvoy was expelled from Plaid Cymru on 16 January 2018 and sat as an independent AM until 2021. Nathan Gill stood down on 27 December 2017 and was replaced by Mandy Jones. Mandy Jones left the UKIP group on 9 January 2018 over a fallout over her staff.

==== Local elections ====
The introduction of directly elected mayors in several parts of England has witnessed the election of independents to run councils in Stoke-on-Trent, Middlesbrough, Bedford, Hartlepool and Mansfield. The first Mayor of London, Ken Livingstone, was first elected as an independent, having run against the official Labour candidate Frank Dobson. He was subsequently re-admitted to the Labour Party in December 2003 before his first re-election campaign.

Independent candidates frequently stand and are elected to local councils. There is a special Independent group of the Local Government Association to cater for them. A number of local authorities have been entirely or almost entirely composed of independent members, such as the City of London Corporation, the Isles of Scilly Council, Orkney Islands Council, Shetland Islands Council and Comhairle nan Eilean Siar (Western Isles Council) in the Outer Hebrides.

In 2023, Central Bedfordshire became the first unitary authority in England to have an independent administration.

Roughly a quarter of the police and crime commissioners elected in England and Wales in the 2012 election were independents.

=== European Parliament ===
In the European Parliament such politicians are called Non-Inscrits.

== Oceania ==
=== Australia ===
Independents are a recurrent feature of the federal Parliament of Australia, and they are more commonly elected to state parliaments. There have been up to five independents in every federal parliament since 1990, and independents have won twenty-eight times during national elections in that time. A large proportion of independents are former members of one of Australia's four main parties, the Australian Labor Party, the Liberal Party of Australia, the Australian Greens, or the National Party of Australia. In 2013 a political party named the Australian Independents was registered with the Australian Electoral Commission.

At the dissolution of parliament before the 2019 federal election, four independents sat in the Australian House of Representatives: Andrew Wilkie (Member for Denison), Cathy McGowan (Member for Indi), Kerryn Phelps (Member for Wentworth), and Julia Banks (Member for Chisholm). Of these, Wilkie had previously been a Greens candidate, McGowan had been a Liberal staffer, and Banks was elected as a Liberal MP before resigning from the party in November 2018. At the 2019 election, Wilkie was re-elected as the Member for Clark, while McGowan retired, and both Phelps and Banks lost their seats. However, two new independents entered parliament: Zali Steggall (Member for Warringah) and Helen Haines (Member for Indi).

After the 2022 federal election, a record ten independents were elected to the House of Representatives, including re-elected members Andrew Wilkie (Clark), Zali Steggall (Warringah), and Helen Haines (Indi). Seven new independents were elected to the House of Representatives: Dai Le (Fowler), Zoe Daniel (Goldstein), Monique Ryan (Kooyong), Allegra Spender (Wentworth), Kate Chaney (Curtin), Kylea Tink (North Sydney), and Sophie Scamps (Mackellar). Several of the newly elected independents have been branded Teal independents, due to their use of the colour teal in campaigning material, similar policy platforms and support from Climate 200.

Independent senators are quite rare. In modern politics, Independent Brian Harradine served from 1975 to 2005 with considerable influence at times. Nick Xenophon was the only elected independent senator after his election to the Senate at the 2007 federal election and was re-elected for another six-year term at the 2013 federal election. He resigned from the Australian Senate in 2017 to contest a seat in the House of Assembly of South Australia. DLP Senator John Madigan became an independent senator in September 2014, but lost his seat in the 2016 election. PUP Senators Jacqui Lambie and Glenn Lazarus became Independent senators in November 2014 and March 2015 respectively. Lambie was re-elected in 2019 with the support of the Jacqui Lambie Network. At the 2022 Australian federal election, independent senator for the ACT David Pocock was elected, becoming the first independent senator from a territory.

=== New Zealand ===
Originally, there were no recognised parties in the New Zealand parliament, although loose groupings did exist informally (initially between supporters of central government versus provincial governments, and later between liberals and conservatives). The foundation of formal political parties, starting at the end of the 19th century, considerably diminished the number of unaffiliated politicians, although a smaller number of independent candidates continued to be elected up until the 1940s. Since then, however, there have been relatively few independent politicians in Parliament. No independent candidate has won or held a seat in a general election since 1943, although two independent candidates have been successful in by-elections (in all cases after having held the seats in question as partisan candidates up until that point). Other politicians have become independents in the course of a parliamentary term, but not been voted into office as such.

The last person to be directly elected to Parliament as an independent in New Zealand was Winston Peters, who won the 1993 by-election in Tauranga electorate as an independent after having previously held it as a member of the National Party. By the time of the next general election, he had formed his own party (New Zealand First), and thus was no longer standing as an independent. Since that time, the only independents in Parliament have been people who quit or were expelled from their original party but retained their seats without going through a by-election. Some have gone on to found or co-found their own parties, with varying levels of success—examples include Peter Dunne, Taito Phillip Field, Gordon Copeland, Tau Henare, and Alamein Kopu. Others have joined parties which were then outside Parliament, such as Frank Grover and Tuariki Delamere.

There were two independent MPs in the 49th New Zealand Parliament: Chris Carter and Hone Harawira. Carter became an independent after his criticisms of the Labour Party's leadership resulted in his being expelled from the Labour caucus, while Harawira resigned from the Māori Party and, after a short period as an independent, also resigned as an MP in order to force the 2011 by-election when he was re-elected as representative of his new political party, Mana and retained the seat in the 2011 General Election. There were also two other parties which had only a single MP: United Future with Peter Dunne and ACT with David Seymour. Neither Dunne nor Seymour was classed as an independent—Dunne's presence in Parliament was due to personal votes in his home electorate, and Seymour's presence was as the sole elected MP of ACT because of a collapse in their support in the 2011 election. In the 50th New Zealand Parliament there was one independent MP: Brendan Horan, a former New Zealand First MP who was expelled from his party because of allegations of misappropriation of family assets.

Peter Dunne effectively became an Independent MP for a short period after his United Future political party was deregistered on 25 June 2013 by the Electoral Commission, as the party no longer had the required minimum of 500 members. The party was subsequently re-registered two months later.

=== Niue ===
In Niue, there have been no political parties since 2003, when the Niue People's Party disbanded, and all politicians are de facto independents. The government depends on an informal coalition.

== See also ==
- Backbencher
- Centrism
- Electoral reform
- Benjamin Franklin
- Independent Conservative
- Independent Liberal
- Independent voter
- Non-partisan democracy
- Nonpartisanship
- Nonpartisanism
- Party switching
- Radical centrism
- Swing vote
- Syncretic politics
- Civic list (electoral)
