= Kathleen Campbell-Brown =

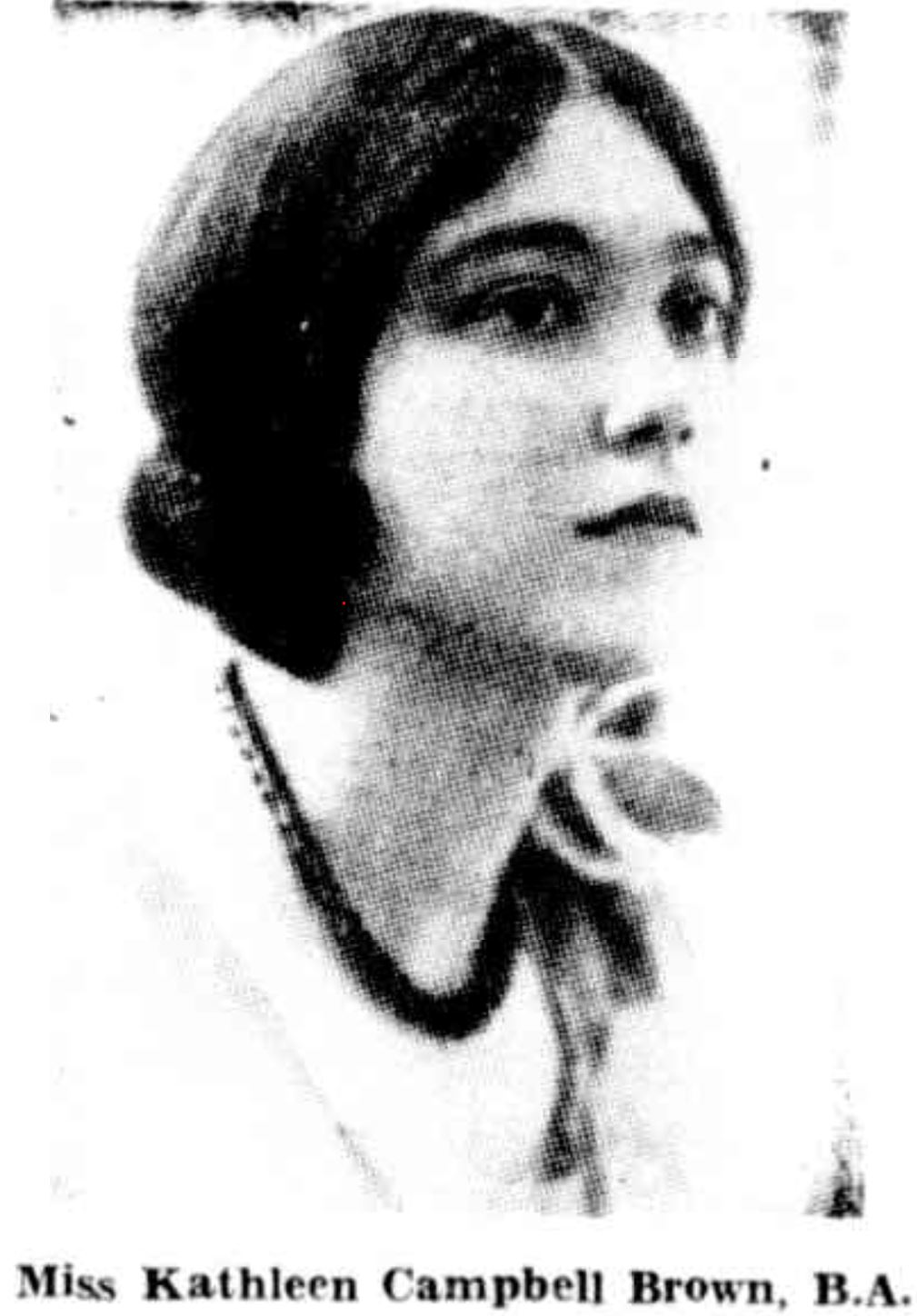
Kathleen Campbell-Brown, 1933

Kathleen Campbell-Brown (1903–1996) was a lecturer in French at the University of Queensland for almost 30 years.

== Early life ==
Kathleen Mildred Jean Campbell-Brown (1903–1996) was born in Kings Norton, Worcestershire, England, the eldest daughter of George Frederick and Jean Campbell-Brown. After the family migrated to Australia in 1911, Campbell-Brown attended Leichardt Street Girls School in Spring Hill, Brisbane and Brisbane Girls Grammar School. She earned one of the 20 scholarships to attend the University of Queensland in 1921. She earned her B.A. with Honours in classics and ancient history in 1924. From 1925–28 she taught classics at Brisbane Girls Grammar School. She would then win an Orient free scholarship through the university in 1929 to undertake three years overseas study.

== Career ==
After studying classics and Latin at the University of Grenoble, France and at the Sorbonne in Paris, Campbell-Brown was appointed an Anglaise assistant at the Ecole Normale at Saint Germain-en-Laye and later a teachers' training college. She also studied phonetics in England. She returned from Europe in 1933, after attending meetings of the Association of the Federation of University Women, an organisation (A.F.U.W.) she would remain attached to for most of her career.

Campbell-Brown joined the staff of St Margaret's College in Brisbane as senior mistress in French in 1935. She would later join the staff of the French department of the University of Queensland in 1945. She would take her M.A from UQ in 1949 with a thesis on "the influence of Greek classical drama on French contemporary theatre". In addition to her lecturing responsibilities, Campbell-Brown was active in establishing the UQ staff and graduates club. She opened her home each fortnight for advanced students to practise their French. She was active in the Alliance Francaise club, which also presented French plays. She taught French classes on ABC radio. She was also active in the Modern Language Teachers Association of Queensland, and organised in service courses for teachers.

Campbell-Brown did not marry. She died in April 1996.

== Awards and legacy ==
Campbell-Brown was honoured with a Chevalier de l’Ordre des Palmes académiques in 1958 by the French Government. In 1967, she was awarded a Chevalier de l’Ordre national du Mérite.

Campbell-Brown retired from the university in 1973 as a senior lecturer in French. In 1985 the university commissioned Rhyl Hinwood to sculpt a grotesque in Campbell-Brown's honour, to be placed within the Great Court.

A scholarship is made available in Campbell-Brown's name yearly for a student to study French overseas, a bequest from her sister Leslie Campbell-Brown's (1908–1991) estate. Kathleen Campbell-Brown also made a bequest from her own estate to support the social work research her sister, Leslie had pursued at the University of Sydney's Department of Social Work, Social Policy and Sociology.

A portrait bust of Kathleen Campbell-Brown, sculpted by Rhyl Hinwood, resides at Brisbane Girls Grammar School, where Campbell-Brown was both a student and teacher.
