= Katherine Brown (psychologist) =

British psychologist

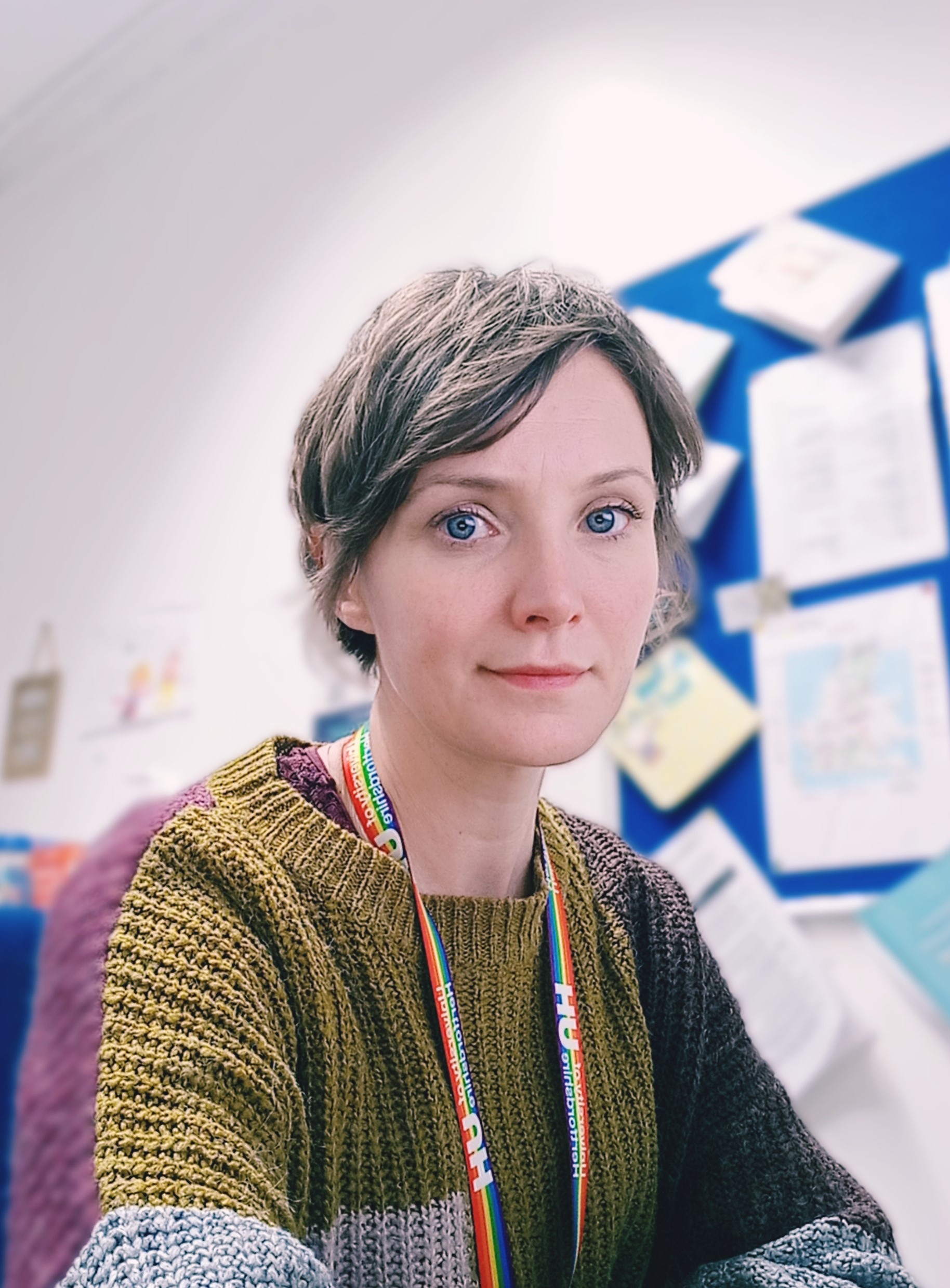
- Katherine Brown
- Occupation: University professor

Academic background
- Education: PhD, 2004
- Alma mater: Sheffield Hallam University

Academic work
- Discipline: Health psychologist
- Sub-discipline: Public health

Katherine Brown is the professor of behaviour change in health in the Department of Psychology, Sports and Geography at the University of Hertfordshire.

== Early life and education ==
She was awarded her PhD in 2004 at Sheffield Hallam University.

== Career ==
She held posts as lecturer, senior lecturer and professor of health psychology applied to public health at Coventry University where she was course director of the MSc health psychology programme for a period of three years. She was acting lead of the Centre for Technology Enabled Health Research (CTEHR) sub-theme behaviour and interventions research.

She is a chartered psychologist, registered as a health psychologist with the Health and Care Professions Council, and full member of the Division of Health Psychology. Her academic and professional expertise encompasses sexual and reproductive; health education; intervention design, development and evaluation; eHealth; public health communication; and health and wellbeing outcomes. From 2020 to present day she has led the Public Health Interventions Responsive Studies Team (PHIRST) Connect commissioned by the National Institute for Health Research.

The initial focus of Brown's research was sexual health, but this has been expanded to include research in the fields of obesity, smoking cessation, low rates of breastfeeding, public health interventions from design and implementation to evaluation, and the use of eHealth as a method of intervention delivery. She had also worked on the support of interventions that bolster sexual health and wellbeing outcomes, such as supporting the cessation of female genital mutilation within migrant African communities in Europe, as well as the study of the widespread impacts of sexual assault referral centres on the mental and sexual health and quality of life for survivors across a number of ages.

Brown has contributed to national strategies including the sexual health care pathway for school nursing, the female genital mutilation care pathway for the Department of Health, and she is currently working with Public Health England on the social and behavioural sciences strategy. Since 2011 she has spent more than eight years working at Public Health Warwickshire leading public health research and evaluation, and also holds an honorary contract with Public Health England.

Her research has been supported by sources including the British Academy, the National Institute for Health Research, the Medical Research Council, the European Commission and commercial funders.

== Publications ==
She has published in psychology, medicine, and public health, with more than 70 peer-reviewed publications and academic reports, and in excess of 30 presentations as a keynote and invited speaker.

Brown is also Editor of the member's publication for the Health Psychology in Public Health Network, and a member of their committee that aims to increase the use of the evidence discovered in Health Psychology within public health commissioning and practice.

== Public health intervention studies ==
Brown and Professor Julia Jones are the chief investigators of one of six national Public Health Interventions Responsive Studies Team (https://phirst.nihr.ac.uk/about-phirst/phirst-connect/). Funded by the National Institute for Health Research, the PHIRST programme aims to improve public health in partnership with local authorities and their collaborating organisations. The team provides a central advisory point, conducts research and evaluates public health initiatives, services and programmes by these authorities.

The Central PHIRST began working on 1 August 2020, and includes researchers with backgrounds in public health; social work and social care; criminology; psychology; sociology; nursing; biomedical and environmental sciences; health economics; pharmacology; epidemiology; and sports science. Brown and Wills also make use of their existing research connections and membership networks for further expertise. The team worked initially with Leeds City Council and partners to evaluate the implementation of remote services for drugs and alcohol delivery during the COVID-19 pandemic. Their second project is with the Welsh Government to assess the impact of changing a long-standing exercise referral scheme from face-to-face to delivery via the internet as a result of COVID-19. In both cases the aim is to understand the adaptation to remote delivery during the pandemic impacted services, staff and service users, in order to understand how to best structures services in the future based on the evidence of this research.
