= Kate Louise Brown =

American writer

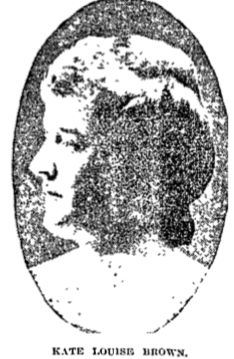
- Born: May 8, 1857; Adams, Massachusetts
- Died: December 31, 1921 (aged 64)
- Education: Reading High School, Bridgewater, Massachusetts
- Occupation(s): Children's writer, children's educator
- Notable work: The Plant Baby and Its Friends, Little People, Alice and Tom, "The Little Seed"
- Style: Children's literature
- Parents: Edgar M. Brown (father); Mary T. Brown (mother)

Kate Louise Brown (May 8, 1857 – December 31, 1921) was a children's educator and author who wrote 17 works in a total of 41 publications, in addition to poems, songs, and magazine articles. She is best known for the books, The Plant Baby and Its Friends, Little People, Alice and Tom, and Stories in Songs.

Brown was born in Adams, Massachusetts and had her first poem published in print at age 9. She wrote many children's scientific novels, poems, and periodical articles, many of which surround nature and botany themes. For example, her book The Plant Baby and Its Friends, published in 1898, explains botany like the plant is a child. Brown believed in presenting advanced topics to children in an interesting way as a story, not in textbook form.

While she was most famous for her books, Brown also wrote poems for children ("Goddesses", "The Return", "Clappers", "The Christ Clappers") and music for kindergarten marching plays. Her poems were featured in children's textbooks for school.

== Early life ==
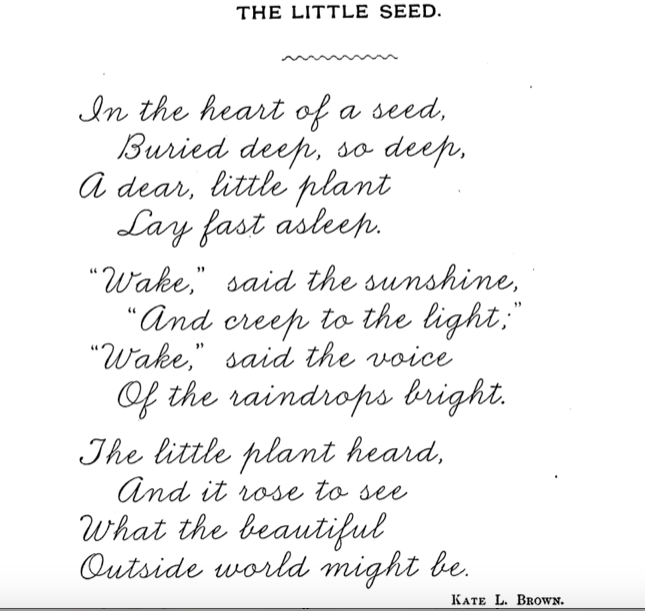
An excerpt of Brown's poem "The Little Seed" in a children's textbook, Stepping Stones to Literature: A Third Reader

Brown was born in the Berkshire countryside of Massachusetts and grew up spending her time outside, flourishing her love for nature as she studied birds, animals, and plants.

After her first poem was published at 9, she was given an encouraging letter by the publisher to keep writing. This initial success drove her to begin writing plays and stories. She even began a weekly magazine alongside two children whose parents were authors.

As a child, she drew inspiration from "Ode to Evening," by William Collins, "Daffodils," also known as "I Wandered Lonely as a Cloud", and "Cynthia" which shaped her future poetry.

== Adult life ==
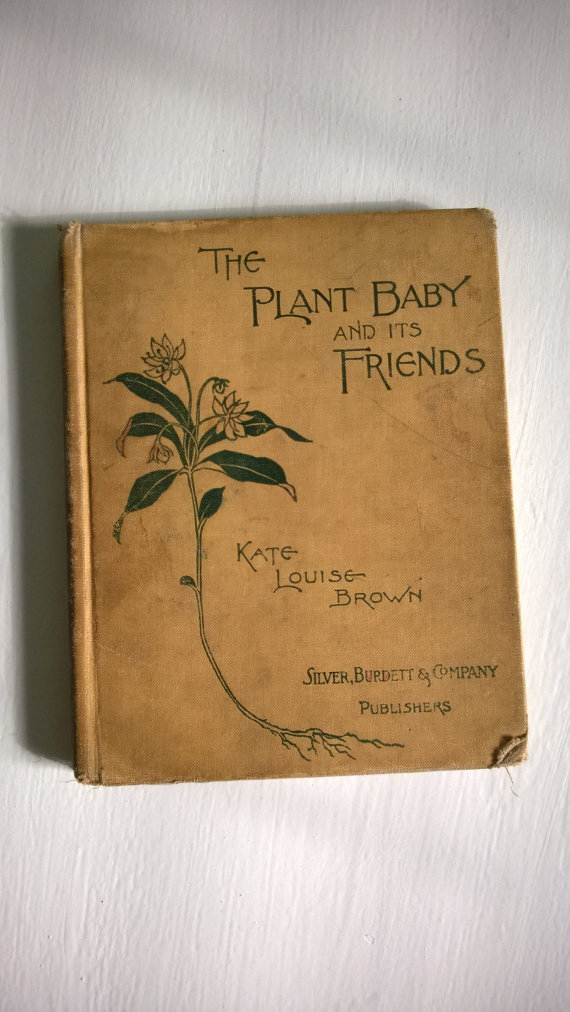

Her first novel was a story about southern life and slavery with the main protagonist dying at the end. Her later novels greatly contrast this story as she began writing about educational, religious, and science-based topics.

Brown's adult life consisted of teaching and writing. During the day, she taught in association with famous children's teachers of the 19th century: Elizabeth Peabody and Mary Tyler Peabody Mann. When she wasn't teaching, she wrote novels, poems, articles, and songs. Some of her most popular novels help children interact with science and nature. Alice and Tom is a book of lessons that follows the lives of the two children and the interaction between nature and humans. She also contributed to religious magazines and periodicals. She composed textbooks for children's writing and literature, like The Interstate Second Reader, and A Third Reader

In The Plant Baby and Its Friends, the book is "To Sarah Louise Arnold," a fellow children's writer and grammar teacher, who also was president of the Girl Scouts in 1925. Arnold has "The Little Seed" published in one of her textbooks for teaching grammar and literature. Brown was very active in the educational community, as she was in the Author's Club, and had many connections with famous writers.
