= Kate Robson Brown =

British Academic

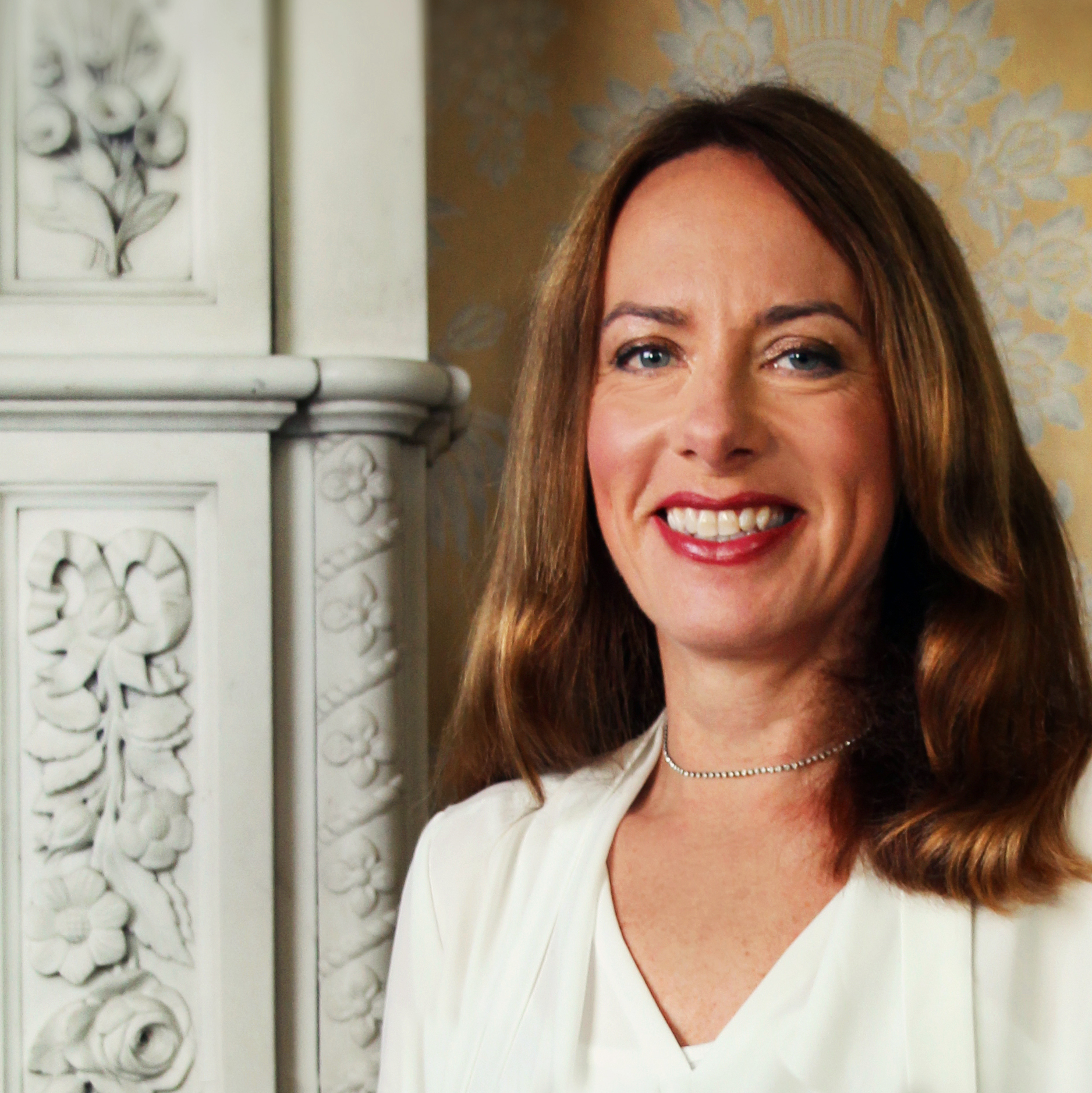
- Occupations: Vice President for Research, Innovation and Impact at UCD
- Years active: 1992 -
- Board member of: Space Academic Network, UK Life and Biomedical Sciences Association

Academic background
- Education: BA (hons), MA, PhD
- Alma mater: University of CambridgeUniversity of Bristol
- Academic advisor: Rob Foley
- Website: https://www.ucd.ie/president/about/universityleadership/universitymanagementteam/katerobsonbrown/

Katharine A. Robson Brown is an Academic, professor and researcher in Biological Archeology and Engineering. She is Vice-President for Research, Innovation and Impact at the University College Dublin. She is also a co-chair of the Space Academic Network, a Board member of the UK Life and Biomedical Sciences Association, and a member of the Space Partnership Board.

== Career ==
Robson Brown joined the faculty at the University of Bristol in 1997 after earning her PhD. She was elected into a Phyllis and Eileen Gibbs Travelling Research Fellowships. In her early years at Bristol, she developed the UK's first tomography laboratory within a forensic or physical anthropology department. From 2005 until 2010, Robson Brown was a founding member of the Human Tissue Authority. In 2005, she was a co-chair of HTA's Import and export working group and Public display working group, as well as a lay member in HTA's Authority.

During the 2011–12 academic term Robson Brown worked alongside geologist Nicholas Minter and biologist Nigel Franks to examine how nest architecture is influenced by factors both social and environmental. The next academic term, Robson Brown earned a University Research Fellowship. The 2015–16 academic year resulted in Robson Brown collaborating with the Radiocarbon Accelerator Unit at the University of Oxford to examine six mortuary chests within Winchester Cathedral. She was later the recipient of Bristol's 2016/17 Engagement Award for her research project Skeletons: Our Buried Bones, in collaboration with Bristol Museums.

She was appointed Director of the Jean Golding Institute in August 2017. With her appointment, Robson Brown earned one of four APEX awards from the Royal Society to research how bones respond to stress. The next year, she was named Turing University Lead after Bristol joined the Alan Turing Institute. In 2019, Robson Brown and Heidi Dawson-Hobbis found that remains left behind in Winchester Cathedral belonged to 23 Anglo-Saxon kings and queens, rather than 11 people that was originally thought. That year also brought about a collaboration between the Jean Golding Institute and Strathmore University Business School in Nairobi, Kenya. She was also co-director of the Human Spaceflight Capitalisation Office in Harwell.

In March 2024 she was appointed as the Vice President for Research, Innovation and Impact at UCD.

In March 2025 Professor Kate Robson Brown was appointed to the Board of Trustees of the Natural History Museum for a four-year term.
