= Catharine Brown (Cherokee teacher) =

Cherokee missionary teacher

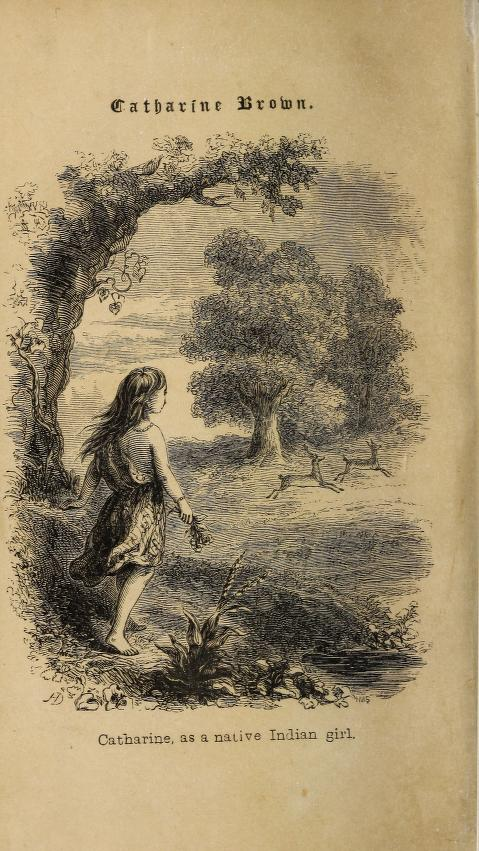
- Catharine as a child
- Born: c.1800 Tsu-sau-ya-sah, Cherokee Nation (present day Alabama)
- Died: July 18, 1823 (aged 22–23); Limestone County, Alabama, US
- Education: Brainerd Mission School
- Occupation: Missionary teacher
- Organization: Creek Path Mission
- Known for: First Cherokee to convert to Christianity

Catharine Brown (c.1800 – July 18, 1823) was a Cherokee woman and missionary teacher at Brainerd Mission School. She was the mission's first Cherokee convert to Christianity and the first Native American woman to see many of her writings extensively published in her lifetime.

== Early life ==
Catharine Brown was born around 1800 to John Brown (Cherokee: Yau-nu-gung-yah-ski), and Sarah Webber Brown (Cherokee: Tsa-luh), about 25 miles (40 km) south east of the Tennessee River at a place known to the Cherokee as Tsu-sau-ya-sah; at that time, it was part of Cherokee Indian territory, but now forms part of the Wills-valley in the State of Alabama between the Raccoon and Lookout mountains. Her parents were prosperous, her father being one of the "headmen" for the Creek-Path Cherokee community, but had no understanding of the English language despite being considered among the most intellectual class of Cherokee within their nation.

== Brainerd Mission School ==
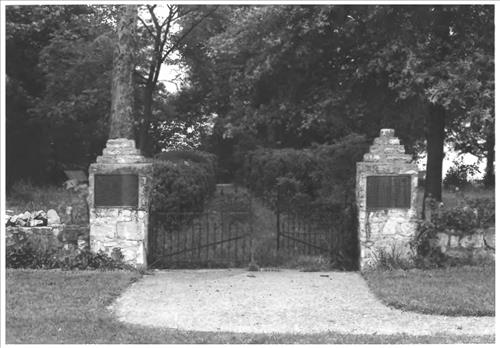
Brainerd Cemetery, Chattanooga, Tennessee

In the autumn of 1816, Rev. Cyrus Kingsbury, a missionary, appeared before the general Council of the Cherokees and requested permission to build schools for them. The request was well received and Kingsbury established the first Board among the Cherokees before moving on to the Choctaw Nation. The Board convened and selected the place for the first school known as Chick-a-mau-gah. The school was later named Brainerd, in memory of David Brainerd, a renowned missionary to the American Indians at that time. The following spring, Moody Hall and Loring S. Williams arrived at the school, with their wives, as assistant missionaries and soon after the school was opened. The news spread throughout the Cherokee Nation quickly and reached Catharine living about 100 miles away. Catharine was seventeen at the time and had learned to speak English while living at the home of a Cherokee friend. She asked her parents to send her to the missionary school and they granted her request. On July 9, 1817, Catharine became a student at Brainerd Mission School.

Considered both beautiful and docile, Catharine made rapid progress. In the first three months she learnt to read and write in English. This had exceeded the progress of anyone known at the time in this or any other country. Catharine became passionate about all that she learned and then around January 1818 she converted to Christianity and was baptized by the missionaries of the Board.

== Women of the mission ==
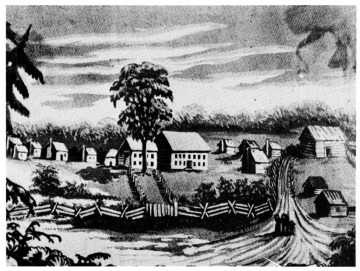
Brainerd Mission, from a sketch by Thomas E. Paine, 1821. The Brainerd Mission, located on Chickamauga Creek near present-day Chattanooga. It was created in 1816 by the Boston-based American Board of Commissioners for Foreign Missions

For Catharine, the community of women at the mission was most likely a comfort to her as shown in her letters while she was away from them in later years. In some ways, it resembled communities of Cherokee women in the society where she grew up. Cherokee women lived very separate lives from the men. They grew their crops together and performed their rituals apart from men. They had their children alone or with the help of other women. They even followed the Cherokee principle of secluding themselves from men during their menstrual period. They controlled everything surrounding the household while men spent very little time around. For the women at Brainerd, life was very much like that of the typical middle-class white women of the Northeast at that time. They were expected to be pious, chaste and submissive. They often sought each other's company to reassure and affirm those values. The women distanced themselves from Cherokee women who did not necessarily share their views and developed very close ties to one another. Along with the female students, they accomplished all the tasks of running the mission together. In addition to this they cared for each other, attended births and shared in responsibilities of child-care. Catharine lamented and mourned the loss of this sense of sisterhood while she was away from Brainerd.

== Teaching at Creek-Path ==
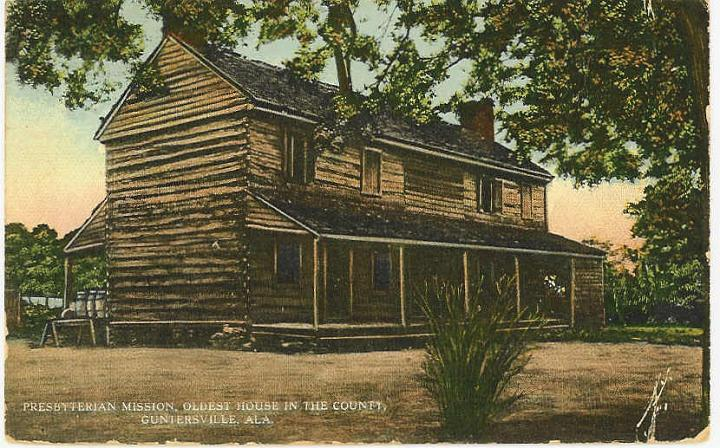
Creek Path Mission, Marshall County, Alabama

The few years Catharine spent at Brainerd were very tumultuous within Cherokee society. The ever encroaching American settlers and increased pressure on the Cherokee to become “civilized” took its toll on the nation. Some pushed back against this change and kept to the “old ways”. Still others embraced the change and took steps towards “civilization.” Catharine's family was one of those and for her the mission and school was a hope for the future of Cherokee society. During a time when the very fabric of Cherokee community was being shredded, the missions offered a sense of community. They incorporated women, although as subordinates, while the new Cherokee political position excluded women, a far contrast to the past when women held important roles within the town councils and communities. In February 1820, a request from Catharine's father to start a mission for boys at Creek Path was heard and provisions to open the school were made. The Creek Path Mission was established in March 1820 by Rev. Daniel S. Butrick and John Arch, a young Cherokee man known as A-tsi. Soon after, a request was made for a girls’ school as well. Catharine was chosen to teach there, in part because she had grown up in Creek Path. She reluctantly accepted the charge with mixed emotions about leaving the friends she had met at Brainerd but also felt a strong sense of importance for the work ahead of her.

== Brother's illness and her own subsequent death ==
In 1821, Catharine's brother, John, contracted tuberculosis and began showing symptoms of the deadly disease. Though she felt a strong tug at rejoining her friends and returning to her work, her Cherokee duty compelled upon her the need to help care for her brother. At the time, the Cherokee believed physical illness was the result of a spiritual ailment that could only be cured by performing sacred rituals. While this was rejected by many Christian missionaries, no alternative was introduced and many Christian Cherokees themselves practiced traditional medicine to treat illnesses. It was then no surprise when Catharine joined John's wife on a journey to a sulphur spring in Alabama. To the Cherokee, water had a certain healing property of its own and was manifested in many ways within the culture. One such practice was called “going to water” where they bathed daily in running water to purify themselves. It made perfect sense to seek healing for John's ailments by going to the spring. However, the journey was long and John's health continued to deteriorate so they decided to stop at another spring and made camp. He drank the water and bathed in it but to no avail. Six months later John passed.

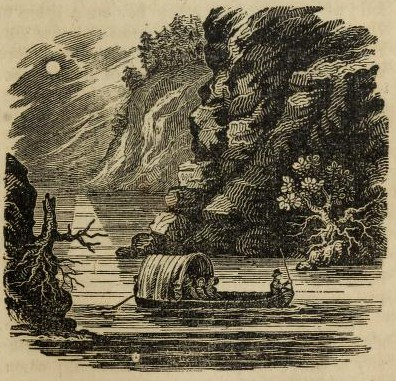
Catharine being taken by canoe

After her brother died, Catharine returned home to care for her parents who, by this time, were in their sixties and living in John's home. She visited the missions at Creek Path and Brainerd but had resigned herself to her duty of caring for her aging parents. In a letter to her other brother, David, she expressed a hope to possibly emigrate west and viewed the opportunity to spread her values with a sense of excitement and enthusiasm. However, Catharine had already began to show signs of the same illness that claimed her brother. She sought the help of Dr. Alexander Campbell, a white physician who lived near Limestone, Alabama, but as her condition grew worse her parents became desperate. Much to the dismay of the missionaries at Brainerd her parents entrusted her care to traditional healers. Their prescriptions reportedly helped little and after she had a severe hemorrhage in her lungs they sent for the missionaries. A week later, Dr. Campbell arrived but her condition was very grave. He had Catharine transported to his home so she would be under constant care. Her mother and sister joined her on the journey by litter, canoe and carriage. On the morning of July 18, 1823, Catharine Brown died at Dr. Campbell's home. He was said to remark upon her death, “Thus fell asleep this lovely saint, in the arms of her Savior".

== Impact and legacy ==
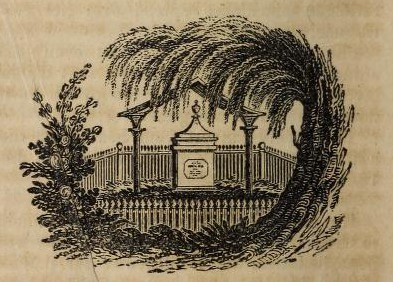
A sketch of the wooden monument erected by the bereaved family of Catharine Brown upon her death at 23 years old in 1823.

After her death, the missionaries at Brainerd commissioned Rufus Anderson to compile a biographical article for Catharine to be included in their magazine, the Missionary Herald. However, so much material was uncovered that the American Board had a book length work published called Memoir of Catharine Brown, A Christian Indian of the Cherokee Nation. While the work exalted the efforts of missionaries to spread the virtues of Christianity to the American Indian, it also suggested that the same work had erased almost all of Catharine's Cherokee identity. In the following years, Catharine's writings were used in political debates about removing the Cherokees and other tribes to Indian Territory in what is now Oklahoma. She was once viewed by literary critics as a victim of early Christian missionaries who, by conversion, became a tragedy because of the loss of her identity. However, as time passed she began to be viewed as a woman representing the lasting revitalization, survival, adaptability and leadership of the Cherokee culture as a whole. Later collections of her letters and diary cemented Catharine's place in early nineteenth-century culture and have had an enduring effect on American perceptions of Native Americans.

== Letters and works ==
- Brown, Catharine (2014). Cherokee Sister: The Collected Writings of Catharine Brown, 1818-1823. University of Nebraska Press. ISBN 978-0-8032-4075-9.
