= Cathy Gordon Brown =

American politician

- Born: March 18, 1965 (age 61)

Cathy Gordon Brown (born March 18, 1965) was an independent candidate for President of the United States in the 2000 United States presidential election, with ballot access only in her home state of Tennessee where she received 1,606 votes, which was more than either third party candidates Howard Phillips (Constitution Party) and John Hagelin (Natural Law Party), or fellow Tennessee independent Randall Venson received. Brown's running mate was Sabrina R. Allen. On 20/20 Downtown, she stated she "always wanted to be the first woman president."

Brown had never filed a statement of candidacy. The Federal Election Commission (FEC) had Brown listed as a resident of Old Hickory, Tennessee. According to the Tennessee Blue Book, the Brown-Allen ticket only had one Elector, even though presidential candidates in Tennessee are allowed eleven electors.

The University of Oregon Oregon Daily Emerald noted that people disturbed by the spoiler effect in elections, particularly with respect to the close 2000 presidential election were singling out Ralph Nader for blame, but not "criticizing Cathy Gordon Brown" or other third party and independent candidates. The April 10, 2004 issue of the "conservative journal of opinion" the Oregon Commentator responded by criticizing her, tongue-in-cheek.
