= Ayo Kimathi =

American anti-LGBT, anti-white, and antisemitic activist

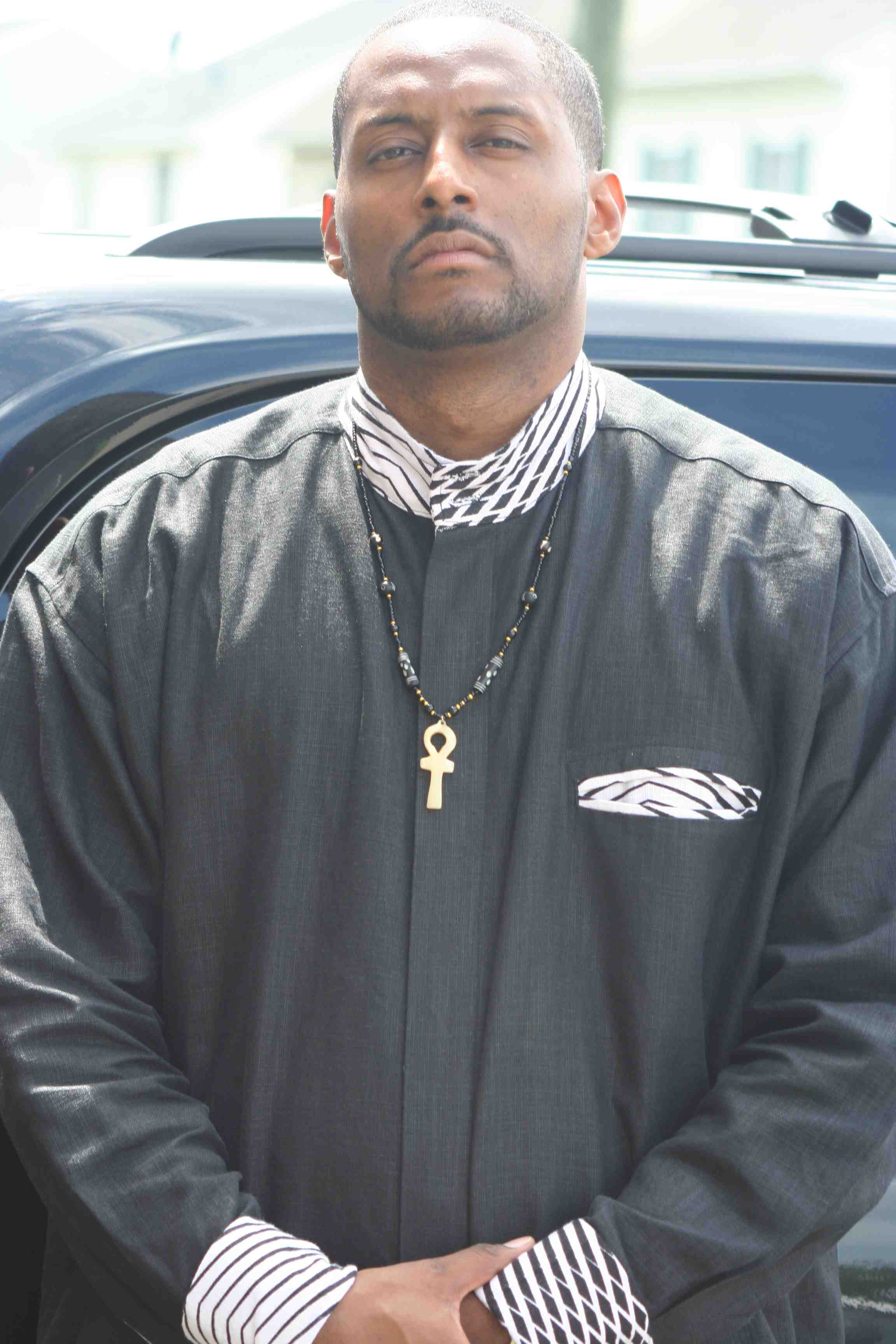
- Born: December 2, 1973 (age 52); Washington D.C., U.S.
- Other name: The Irritated Genie of Soufeese
- Occupations: Black nationalist; activist; lecturer

Ayo H. Kimathi (born December 2, 1973) is an American Black nationalist, anti-LGBT activist, antisemitic author and international lecturer. Born in Southeast Greater Community hospital, he spent his early life in Southeast Washington, D.C., where he became interested in Black history and racial politics. The title he goes by when lecturing is the "Irritated Genie of Soufeese." His website has endorsed the killing of Whites and "black traitors". At one point it held an "enemies list" which included Rev. Al Sharpton, Lil Wayne, Oprah Winfrey, Whoopi Goldberg, Condoleezza Rice, Colin Powell, and Barack Obama.

In July 2009, Kimathi began working in government contracting at Immigration Customs Enforcement (ICE) as a Small Business Specialist. On August 21, 2013, his identity as a Black nationalist leader who spoke out vocally against homosexuality in the Black community was exposed in an online article from The Wire. Once news of this article spread to mainstream news networks such as CNN, FOX News, Huffington Post. Kimathi was put on paid leave and eventually fired in December 2013.

== Work life ==
In 1995, Kimathi took a job as a Small Business Specialist for the Department of the Navy. He worked there until 2003 when he quit to write the book, 'War on the Horizon -Black Resistance to the white-sex Assault' which he self-published in 2005. In 2009, after 6 years doing lectures and acting as a part-time real estate agent, Kimathi returned to the U.S. Government Immigration Customs Enforcement (ICE) in the capacity of assisting small businesses in winning contracts. He was eventually fired in December 2013 for his lecture work done under the pseudonym "Irritated Genie of Soufeese." The 'Irritated Genie' is the title of a book authored by Jacob Carruthers and it refers to the spirit of the Black people who fought in the Haitian Revolution. 'Soufeese' is the phonetic spelling of the way many D.C. natives pronounce Southeast, the quadrant of Washington, D.C., where Kimathi grew up, Southeast, Washington, D.C..

In August 2015, he joined a newly formed movement called the Straight Black Pride Movement (SBPM). In September 2015, Kimathi traveled to Bermuda to perform his "Effeminization of the Black Male" lecture. In this lecture he spoke to the audience about the SBPM. As a result of this lecture, the Minister of Home Affairs for Bermuda, Michael Fahy, officially banned Kimathi from the country for 5 years.

Kimathi often airs his intense hatred of Jews. In 2023, Kamathi self-published a book entitled 'Jews Are the Problem'. On April 1, 2023, Kimathi appeared as a guest on the White nationalist and neo-Nazi podcast Fash the Nation, a podcast under the umbrella of the Right Stuff (blog) radio network, where he spoke with host JazzHands McFeels. The two spoke on a number of topics that Black and White nationalists find common ground on including hatred of Jews, the opioid epidemic and its effects on both races, and how both movements believe homosexuality needs to be made illegal. In a livestream on September 11, 2023 promoted by former US congresswoman Cynthia McKinney, which had been scheduled to also include David Duke, former Ku Klux Klan grand wizard, Kimathi explicitly advocated for ties with White nationalists to actively eradicate "the Jew." Ayo Kimathi is the subject of Chapter 3 (The African Nationalist) in Jesse Watters' book "Get It Together" published by Broadside Books in 2024. Kimathi filed papers in October 2025 to start his candidacy for the Maryland State Senate's 41st District seat, but in March 2026 he was disqualified from running for unspecified violations and will not be on the November ballot in any form (https://elections.maryland.gov/elections/2026/primary_candidates/2026_GP_statewide_candidatelist.html#statesenatorbydistrict41).

== Books ==
- War on the Horizon - Black Resistance to the white-sex Assault (2005)
- Jews are the Problem (2022)
- Jews are the Problem II - The Psychology of the Jew (2024)
