= Byron G. Rogers =

American politician

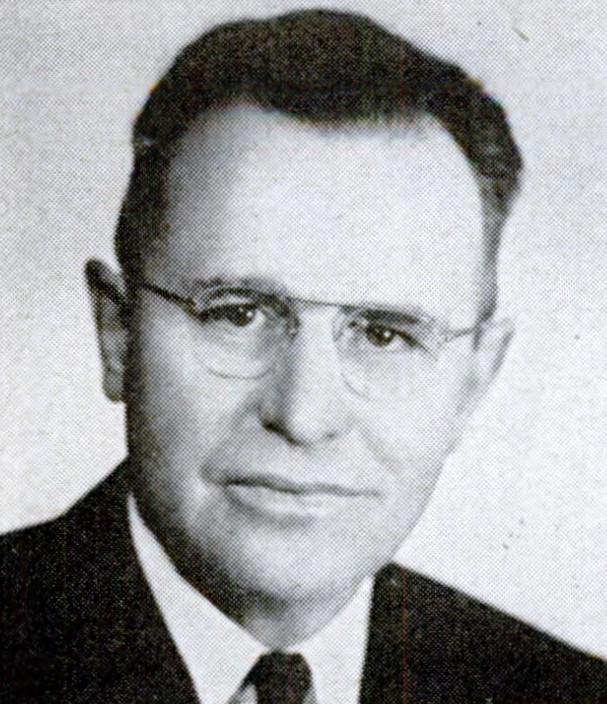
- Rogers, c. 1953

Member of the U.S. House of Representatives from Colorado's 1st district
- In office January 3, 1951 – January 3, 1971
- Preceded by: John A. Carroll
- Succeeded by: Mike McKevitt

Colorado Attorney General
- In office 1936–1940
- Governor: Edwin C. Johnson; Ray Herbert Talbot; Teller Ammons; Ralph L. Carr
- Preceded by: Paul P. Prosser
- Succeeded by: Gail L. Ireland

Speaker of the Colorado House of Representatives
- In office 1933–1933
- Preceded by: Delmar E. Hunter
- Succeeded by: Warren H. Twining

Member of the Colorado House of Representatives
- In office 1932–1935

Personal details
- Born: Byron Giles Roberts; August 1, 1900 Greenville, Texas, U.S.
- Died: December 31, 1983 (aged 83) Denver, Colorado, U.S.
- Resting place: Mount Lindo Cemetery near Tiny Town, Colorado
- Party: Democratic
- Spouse: Helen Kepler (m. 1933)
- Children: 2
- Education: Sturm College of Law, University of Denver
- Occupation: Lawyer; politician

Byron Giles Rogers (August 1, 1900 – December 31, 1983) was an American lawyer, politician, and World War I veteran from Colorado. From 1951 to 1971, he served 10 consecutive terms in the United States House of Representatives.

== Early life ==
Rogers was the son of Peter and Minnie May Rogers. Born in Greenville, Texas, he moved with his parents to Oklahoma in April 1902. He attended the public schools of Checotah, Oklahoma.

=== World War I ===
During the First World War, he served as a private in the Infantry, United States Army.

=== Education ===
He attended the University of Arkansas in 1918, the University of Oklahoma from 1919 to 1922, and the University of Colorado in 1923 and 1924. He earned his LL.B. at Sturm College of Law, University of Denver, 1925, and commenced the practice of law in Las Animas, Colorado.

=== Family ===
He married his secretary, Helen Kepler, in 1933, and they had two children, Shirley Ann and Byron Jr.

== Legal career ==
Rogers served as city attorney of Las Animas from 1929 to 1933. He was a member of the Colorado House of Representatives from 1932 to 1935, serving as speaker in 1933. He served as county attorney of Bent County, Colorado, in 1933, and was later on the legal staff of Agricultural Adjustment Administration and National Recovery Administration, Washington, D.C., in 1933 and 1934. He served as assistant United States Attorney for Colorado 1934 to 1936, and Attorney General of Colorado 1936 to 1941. In November 1942, Rogers was defeated in a bid for a seat on the state supreme court by Republican Frank B. Goudy.

He was a public member of the War Labor Board from 1942 to 1945.

== Congressional career ==
Rogers was elected as a Democrat to the Eighty-second and to 10 succeeding Congresses (January 3, 1951 – January 3, 1971).

=== Defeat and election challenge ===
In 1970, Rogers was accused of supporting the Vietnam War by his primary challenger, Craig Barnes and his supporters. Rogers lost by 30 votes (27,218 to 27,188) and he and his supporters alleged that University of Denver students who were non-residents from other states had illegally voted in the Primary. However, a recount overseen by the Federal Election Commission did not change the Primary Election results.

Nonetheless, according to multiple Denver media outlets, following this controversial Primary and prior to the General Election, 30,000 registered Denver County Democrats rescinded their Democratic Party affiliation, and along with other Rogers’ supporters who remained on the rolls of the Denver County Democratic Party, actively campaigned for the Republican candidate, Denver County District Attorney Mike McKevitt, and elected him to his only term in office by more than a 10,000 vote spread. McKevitt was defeated by Democratic candidate Patricia Schroeder in 1972. Schroeder held the First Congressional District seat in Colorado through her retirement in 1996.

Rogers voted in favor of the Civil Rights Act of 1957.

=== Death and legacy ===
Rogers was a resident of Denver, Colorado until his death there December 31, 1983. He was interred in Mount Lindo Cemetery near Tiny Town, Colorado.

The Byron G. Rogers Federal Building and United States Courthouse was named in his honor in 1984.

== Electoral history ==
Byron Rogers electoral history

1950 United States House of Representatives elections, Colorado's 1st district
Party	Candidate	Votes	%
Democratic	Byron G. Rogers	70,165	50.31%
Republican	Richard G. Luxford	67,436	48.35%
Independent	Tillman H. Eeb	1,287	0.92%
Socialist	Carle Whitehead	585	0.42%
Majority		2,729	1.96%
Total votes		139,473	100%
Democratic hold			

1952 United States House of Representatives elections, Colorado's 1st district
Party	Candidate	Votes	%
Democratic	Byron G. Rogers (incumbent)	101,864	50.78%
Republican	Mason K. Knuckles	97,442	48.57%
Socialist	Carle Whitehead	1,307	0.65%
Majority		4,422	2.21%
Total votes		200,613	100%
Democratic hold			

1954 United States House of Representatives elections, Colorado's 1st district
Party	Candidate	Votes	%
Democratic	Byron G. Rogers (incumbent)	84,745	55.62%
Republican	Ellen G. Harris	67,210	44.11%
Socialist	Carle Whitehead	415	0.27%
Majority		17,535	11.51%
Total votes		152,370	100%
Democratic hold			

1956 United States House of Representatives elections, Colorado's 1st district
Party	Candidate	Votes	%
Democratic	Byron G. Rogers (incumbent)	116,487	57.78%
Republican	Robert S. McCollum	85,127	42.22%
Majority		31,360	15.56%
Total votes		201,614	100%
Democratic hold			

1958 United States House of Representatives elections, Colorado's 1st district
Party	Candidate	Votes	%
Democratic	Byron G. Rogers (incumbent)	107,567	66.66%
Republican	John L. Harpel	53,801	33.34%
Majority		53,766	33.32%
Total votes		161,368	100%
Democratic hold			

1960 United States House of Representatives elections, Colorado's 1st district
Party	Candidate	Votes	%
Democratic	Byron G. Rogers (incumbent)	121,610	60.01%
Republican	Robert D. Rolander	81,042	39.99%
Majority		40,568	20.02%
Total votes		202,652	100%
Democratic hold			

1962 United States House of Representatives elections, Colorado's 1st district
Party	Candidate	Votes	%
Democratic	Byron G. Rogers (incumbent)	94,680	56.00%
Republican	William B. Chenoweth	74,392	44.00%
Majority		20,288	12.00%
Total votes		169,072	100%
Democratic hold			

1964 United States House of Representatives elections, Colorado's 1st district
Party	Candidate	Votes	%
Democratic	Byron G. Rogers (incumbent)	138,475	67.52%
Republican	Glenn R. Jones	65,423	31.90%
Socialist Workers	Allen D. Taplin	1,183	0.58%
Majority		73,052	35.62%
Total votes		205,081	100%
Democratic hold			

1966 United States House of Representatives elections, Colorado's 1st district
Party	Candidate	Votes	%
Democratic	Byron G. Rogers (incumbent)	92,688	56.03%
Republican	Greg Perason	72,732	43.97%
Majority		19,956	12.06%
Total votes		165,420	100%
Democratic hold			

1968 United States House of Representatives elections, Colorado's 1st district
Party	Candidate	Votes	%
Democratic	Byron G. Rogers (incumbent)	91,199	45.74%
Republican	Frank A. Kemp, Jr.	82,677	41.47%
American Independent	Gordon G. Barnwall	25,499	12.79%
Majority		8,522	4.27%
Total votes		199,375	100%
Democratic hold			

1970 United States House of Representatives elections, Colorado's 1st district
Party	Candidate	Votes	%
Republican	Mike McKevitt	84,643	51.50%
Democratic	Craig S. Barnes	74,444	45.30%
Raza Unida	Salvadore Carpio, Jr.	5,257	3.20%
Majority		10,199	6.20%
Total votes		164,344	100%
Republican gain from Democratic			

Legal offices
Preceded by Paul P. Prosser	Attorney General of Colorado; 1936–1940	Succeeded by Gail L. Ireland
U.S. House of Representatives
Preceded by John A. Carroll	Member of the U.S. House of Representatives from Colorado's 1st congressional district 1951 - 1971	Succeeded by Mike McKevitt
