= Cynthia McKinney–Capitol Hill police incident =

2006 dispute between a Member of Congress and Capitol police

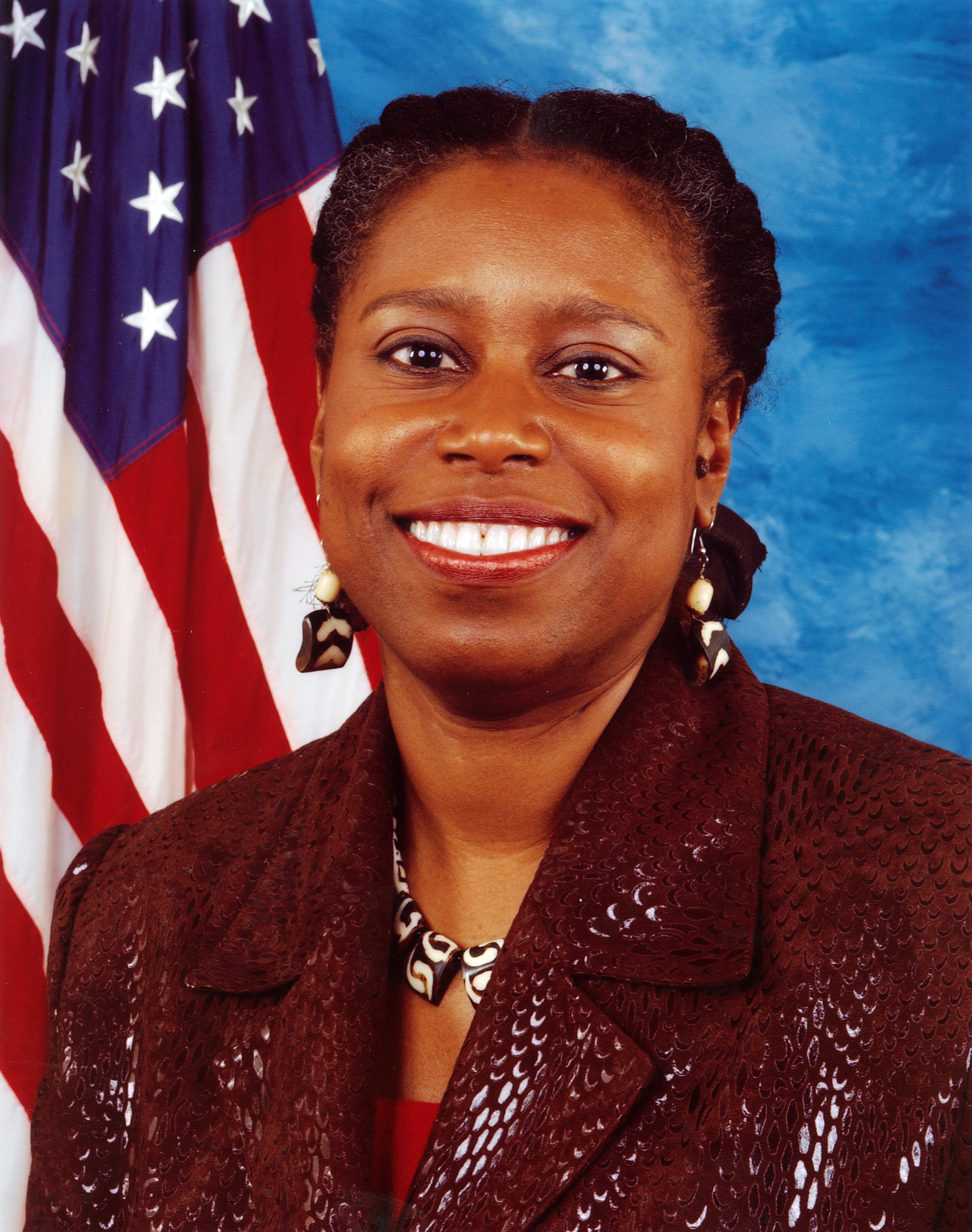
Cynthia McKinney's Congressional photo.

On March 29, 2006, Representative Cynthia McKinney of Georgia had a dispute with Capitol Police. McKinney entered the Longworth House Office Building's southeast entrance after walking around the metal detector at the security checkpoint. She proceeded westward down the ground floor hallway and about halfway down the hallway was grabbed by United States Capitol Police officer Paul McKenna who stated that he had been calling after her "Ma'am, Ma'am!" Two days later Officer McKenna filed a police report claiming that McKinney had "struck his chest with a closed fist." Members of Congress are not required to pass through metal detectors but they are asked to wear identifying lapel pins.

The incident made national headlines and sparked controversies over whether the officers present failed to recognize her as a Member of Congress because she was not wearing the appropriate lapel pin, whether McKinney had just cause to assert that racial profiling played a role in the incident, whether Members of Congress should be required to pass through metal detectors, and even whether McKinney's recent change of hair-style contributed to the incident.

== Police report, media attention and charges ==
Officer McKenna did not arrest McKinney at the time of the incident. He filed a police report later. The following is his exact statement, with C-1 referring to himself and S-1 to Rep. McKinney:

"On 3-29-06, at approximately 0855 hrs. C-1 while performing his official duties as United States Capitol Police Officer and in full uniform, stated that he was physically assaulted by S-1. S-1 struck C-1 in his chest with a closed fist."

== Congressional pin debate ==
McKinney was criticized in the media for failing to wear her pin on the morning of March 29, 2006, with critics charging that her failure to do so led to the confrontation. Many other members have not worn the pin since the McKinney–McKenna affair. A July 5, 2006 article in The Hill titled "Pinpoint: After McKinney, many lawmakers still dress without their congressional pins" noted "no discernible pattern" in the decision by Members of Congress regarding the wearing of the Congressional Pin. Several members indicated they followed the same practice as McKinney. House Majority Leader Rep. John Boehner (R-Ohio) said that he was "not a pin-wearing guy." Another Republican Member, Sherwood Boehlert (NY) explained his reason for not wearing a pin, stating "I know who I am." Democratic Member George Miller (CA) said "I've never worn one. I have enough trouble combing my hair in the morning."

McKinney admitted that she was not wearing her pin that morning but opined that the police responsible for protecting lawmakers should recognize the 435 members of Congress on sight and claimed to have shown her congressional identification badge.

== Initial reactions ==
McKinney made a brief statement on her own behalf at Howard University on March 31: "Let me be clear: this whole incident was instigated by the inappropriate touching and stopping of me, a female black congresswoman. I deeply regret this incident occurred, and I am certain that after a full review of the facts, I will be exonerated."

McKinney garnered little support. Not one Congressional Democrat chose to join her at a news conference to discuss the situation at Howard University, although Delegate Eleanor Holmes Norton sent a supportive statement to be read at the event. Minority Leader Rep. Nancy Pelosi (D-Cal.) later said on April 5 that she "found it hard to see any set of facts that would justify striking a police officer," and McKinney's fellow Georgia Democrat, Rep. John Lewis, told McKinney that "she needs to lower the temperature and stop holding press conferences." Outside of Capitol Hill, the Sarasota Democratic Party withdrew from a rally at which McKinney was due to speak.

== Race in the incident and aftermath ==
The story was picked up by many blogs and internet opinion sites with overwhelming rebuke for McKinney coming from conservatives and also left-leaning sources offering negative portrayals of her, as on the comedy show Saturday Night Live, which lampooned her repeatedly on their April 8, 2006 show for "playing the race card." On April 3, former Wonkette editor Ana Marie Cox, interviewed on Joe Scarborough's MSNBC show Scarborough Country, said that "I worry that she [McKinney] makes us [Democrats] all look a little crazy." Some columnists analyzed her hairstyle in a negative light and question the quick participation of musician/actor/social activist Harry Belafonte.

Reacting to the sudden rise in stakes reflected by the potential for criminal indictment, McKinney's attorney, James Myart, spoke in a March 31 news conference suggesting that the officer involved be criminally investigated for accosting ("inappropriately touching") the congresswoman. This charge was not taken seriously by most commentators and media outlets. Myart said the case typified a pattern of police harassment of black Americans. "...my belief is this is no different than that: 'they all look alike'". On April 25, 2006, CNN reported that Myart was no longer representing McKinney. Recently retired U.S. Capitol Police Chief Terrance Gainer rejected Myart's charge in an interview with CNN:

I've seen our officers stop white members and black members, Latinos, male and females ... It's not an issue about what your race or gender is. It's an issue about making sure people who come into our building are recognized if they're not going through the magnetometer, and this officer at that moment didn't recognize her ... It would have been real easy, as most members of Congress do, to say "here's who I am" or "do you know who I am?"

McKinney has repeatedly stated the incident arose from McKenna's failure to recognize her face, suggesting that a pattern of incidents in which Capitol Police failed to recognize her as a Member of Congress had to do with a general tendency by police in the United States to engage in racial profiling of blacks and therefore tend to handle blacks more roughly.

== Apology ==
On April 6, 2006, after the grand jury was convened to investigate, the Associated Press reported that McKinney had expressed "sincere regret" for the altercation and offered an apology to the House. "There should not have been any physical contact in this incident," McKinney said in a one-minute statement on the House floor. Various commentators, including The Wall Street Journal questioned the sincerity of the apology, noting, among other things, its careful wording, the lack of admission of culpability, and the absence of an apology specifically to the Capitol Police and Officer McKenna.

== Potential legal consequences ==
News reports variously suggested that the police officer as an individual, or the Capitol Police as a whole, were planning to file assault charges. On April 3, 2006, Assistant U.S. Attorney Channing Phillips announced that the Capitol Police had referred the incident to his office for further investigation. On April 5, the Associated Press reported that the case might be referred to a federal grand jury. A sitting Grand Jury was subsequently presented with McKenna's charge of assault of a police officer. Six witnesses were called by the U.S. Attorney's office.

== Charges dropped ==
On June 16, 2006, the grand jury declined to indict McKinney, finding insufficient grounds to proceed. Under 18 U.S.C. §111(a), McKinney faced a fine and/or up to eight years in prison if convicted of assaulting an "officer or employee of the United States."

It was suggested on Fox News that McKinney's allegations of racism and sexism were overplayed on her part and had a boomerang effect.

Though not indicted for criminal charges or subjected to disciplinary action by the House, the president of the Fraternal Order of Police said of Officer McKenna, "We're going to make sure the officer won't be harassed. We want the officer to be able talk to experts, who can look at his legal recourses, if he needed to."

== See also ==
- Henry Louis Gates arrest controversy
