= Association for the Study of Classical African Civilizations =

Founded in 1984, it promotes African history, culture, and education globally

The Association for the Study of Classical African Civilizations (ASCAC) is an independent study group devoted to the rescue, reconstruction, and restoration of African history and culture. It was founded in 1984 by Drs. John Henrik Clarke, Asa Grant Hilliard, Leonard Jeffries, Jacob H. Carruthers, Yosef Ben-Jochannan, and Maulana Karenga.

ASCAC provides the opportunity for "African peoples to educate other African peoples about their culture". ASCAC was founded by scholars with ties to African-American communities in New York City, Chicago, Atlanta, and Los Angeles and derives its membership from African Americans across class and occupational locations.

ASCAC has expanded into an international organization, with membership regions representing the continental United States, the Caribbean, Africa, and Europe. ASCAC has four commissions which advance this agenda: education, research, spiritual development, and creative production. Along with creating study groups throughout the world, ASCAC holds an annual conference, operates a youth enrichment program, and is editing a comprehensive history of Africa.

== Founding ==
The Association for the Study of Classical African Civilizations was initially conceptualized and developed during the First Annual Ancient Egyptian Studies Conference in Los Angeles, California, on February 26, 1984, by:

- Dr. John Henrik Clark
- Dr. Asa Grant Hilliard
- Dr. Leonard Jeffries
- Dr. Yosef Ben-Jochannan
- Dr. Maulana Karenga
- Dr. Jacob H. Carruthers
