= Protecting Students from Sexual and Violent Predators Act =

- Long title: To amend the Elementary and Secondary Education Act of 1965 to require criminal background checks for school employees.
- Announced in: the 113th United States Congress
- Sponsored by: Rep. George Miller (D, CA-11)
- Number of co-sponsors: 4

Codification
- Acts affected: Elementary and Secondary Education Act of 1965, Adam Walsh Child Protection and Safety Act of 2006
- U.S.C. sections affected: 20 U.S.C. § 7901 et seq.

Legislative history
- Introduced in the House as H.R. 2083 by Rep. George Miller (D, CA-11) on May 22, 2013; Committee consideration by United States House Committee on Education and the Workforce, United States House Education Subcommittee on Early Childhood, Elementary and Secondary Education

The Protecting Students from Sexual and Violent Predators Act (H.R. 2083) is a bill that would require schools receiving federal funds to run criminal background checks on their employees and potential hires. Anyone convicted of specific crimes, such as homicide, kidnapping, or rape, would be barred from employment. The bill was introduced into the United States House of Representatives during the 113th United States Congress. It passed in the House on October 22, 2013.

== Provisions of the bill ==
This summary is based largely on the summary provided by the Congressional Research Service, a public domain source.

The Protecting Students from Sexual and Violent Predators Act would amend the Elementary and Secondary Education Act of 1965 to require each state educational agency (SEA) that receives funds under that Act to:

(1) require criminal background checks for each school employee. The background check would include searches of the criminal registry or repository for each state in which the employee has resided, the child abuse and neglect registries and databases of such states, the Integrated Automated Fingerprint Identification System of the Federal Bureau of Investigation (FBI), and the National Sex Offender Registry;
(2) prohibit the employment of an individual who refuses to consent to, or who makes false statements in connection with, a background check. They would also be required to prohibit the employment of an individual who has been convicted of one of specified felonies or of a violent or sexual crime against a minor;
(3) require an SEA or a local educational agency to report to local law enforcement whenever background check information indicates that a sexual predator has applied for employment;
(4) require background checks to be repeated or updated in accordance with state law or local educational policy but not less than every five years; and
(5) provide each school employee who has had a background check with a copy of, and a timely process to appeal, the results.

The bill would allow a state educational agency to maintain an inventory of all the information from background checks conducted on school employees in the state.

== Procedural history ==
=== House ===
The Protecting Students from Sexual and Violent Predators Act introduced into the House on May 22, 2013 by Rep. George Miller (D, CA-11). It was referred to the United States House Committee on Education and the Workforce and the United States House Education Subcommittee on Early Childhood, Elementary and Secondary Education. On October 17, 2013, House Majority Leader Eric Cantor announced that H.R. 2083 was scheduled for a vote under a suspension of the rules on October 22, 2013. The bill passed the House on October 22, 2013 by unanimous consent.

== Debate and discussion ==
Speaking in favor of the bill, Rep. Miller said that "we should be doing everything we can to prevent these abuses," and that "the very fundamental place to start is to not employ predators in our schools in the first place."

The bill was considered to be nonpartisan. Newspaper The Hill said that this bill and three others from the week of October 21, 2013, would give the House "a chance to practice the long-forgotten art of working together." This was a reference to the contentious United States federal government shutdown of 2013, which ended the previous week.

== See also ==
- List of bills in the 113th United States Congress
- Elementary and Secondary Education Act
