= Mike McKevitt =

American politician (1928–2000)

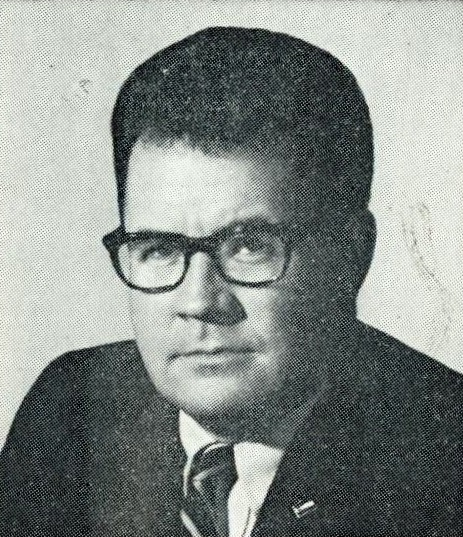

Member of the Korean War Memorial Commission
- In office 1987–1995
- President: Ronald Reagan

Counsel at White House Energy Policy Office
- In office 1973–1974
- President: Richard Nixon
- Preceded by: Position created
- Succeeded by: Robert E. Montgomery Jr.

United States Assistant Attorney General for the Office of Legislation
- In office 1973–1973
- President: Richard Nixon
- Preceded by: Position created
- Succeeded by: W. Vincent Rakestraw

Member of the U.S. House of Representatives from Colorado's 1st district
- In office January 3, 1971 – January 3, 1973
- Preceded by: Byron Rogers
- Succeeded by: Pat Schroeder

District Attorney for Denver, Colorado
- In office 1967–1971
- Preceded by: Bert M. Keating
- Succeeded by: Jarvis W. Secombe

Assistant Attorney General for Colorado
- In office 1958–1967

Personal details
- Born: James Douglas McKevitt; October 26, 1928 Spokane, Washington, U.S.
- Died: September 28, 2000 (aged 71) Washington, D. C., U.S.
- Resting place: Arlington National Cemetery
- Party: Republican
- Occupation: Attorney

James Douglas "Mike" McKevitt (October 26, 1928 – September 28, 2000) was an American lawyer and politician who served one term as a U.S. representative from Colorado from 1971 to 1973.

== Early life and education ==
Born in Spokane, Washington, McKevitt graduated from Grant High School in Sacramento, California. He received a B.A. from the University of Idaho (Moscow, Idaho) in 1951, and a law degree from the University of Denver School of Law in 1956.

=== Military ===
He was in the United States Air Force from 1951 to 1953, rising to the rank of captain.

== Career ==
He was a lawyer in private practice. He served as assistant attorney general, Colorado state attorney general's office from 1958 to 1967. He served as District Attorney, Denver, Colorado from 1967 to 1971, during which time McKevitt became known for prosecuting and harassing Denver's "hippies" and the restaurants where they would eat. On August 8, 1969, he seized a print of the 1967 Swedish film I Am Curious (Yellow) from the Vogue Art Theater in the city, therefore banning it on the basis of it being "obscene and pornographic". The ban lasted sixteen days, during which the film was returned to the theater. The ban was lifted on August 22, 1969, after a judge declared it to be a "prior restraint on the defendants' right to freedom of speech".

=== Congress ===
McKevitt was elected as a Republican to the Ninety-second Congress (January 3, 1971 – January 3, 1973). That year, 20-year incumbent Democrat Byron Rogers had been defeated in the primary by a considerably more liberal Democrat, attorney Craig Barnes. Several of Rogers' more conservative supporters threw their support to McKevitt in the general election. The split in the party combined with McKevitt's popularity to allow McKevitt to win by 10,000 votes. However, McKevitt was a conservative Republican in a strongly Democratic district, and he was defeated for reelection to the Ninety-third Congress in 1972 by liberal Democrat Pat Schroeder.

== Later career ==
McKevitt remained in Washington for some time after his brief congressional term, serving as Assistant United States Attorney General, Office of Legislation in 1973, a counsel on energy policy the White House from 1973 to 1974, and a member of the Korean War Memorial Commission from 1987 to 1995.

== Death and burial ==
He died on September 28, 2000, in Washington, D.C. He was interred at Arlington National Cemetery, Arlington, Virginia.

== Electoral history ==
1970 United States House of Representatives elections, Colorado's 1st district
Party	Candidate	Votes	%
Republican	Mike McKevitt	84,643	51.50%
Democratic	Craig S. Barnes	74,444	45.30%
Raza Unida	Salvadore Carpio, Jr.	5,257	3.20%
Majority		10,199	6.20%
Total votes		164,344	100%
Republican gain from Democratic			

1972 United States House of Representatives elections, Colorado's 1st district
Party	Candidate	Votes	%
Democratic	Pat Schroeder	101,832	51.56%
Republican	Mike McKevitt (incumbent)	93,733	47.46%
Raza Unida	Maria Pauline Serna	1,629	0.82%
Socialist Workers	Fern Gapin	301	0.15%
Majority		8,099	4.10%
Total votes		197,495	100%
Democratic gain from Republican			

U.S. House of Representatives
Preceded by Byron Rogers	Member of the U.S. House of Representatives from Colorado's 1st congressional district 1971–1973	Succeeded by Patricia Schroeder
