= Billy McKinney (politician) =

American politician (1927–2010)

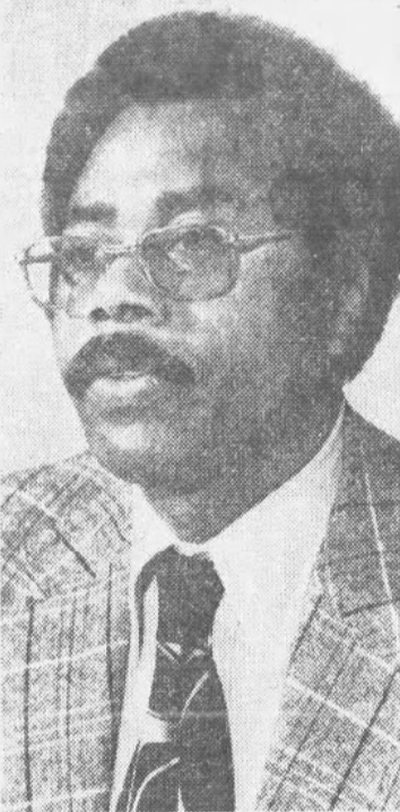
- McKinney in a 1976 article

Member of the Georgia House of Representatives
- In office January 8, 1973 – January 13, 2003
- Preceded by: District established
- Succeeded by: Nan Orrock
- Constituency: 35th district (1973–1993); 51st district (1993–2003)

Personal details
- Born: James Edward McKinney; February 23, 1927 Abbeville, Georgia, U.S.
- Died: July 15, 2010 (aged 83) Atlanta, Georgia, U.S.
- Party: Georgia Green Party
- Other political affiliations: Democratic (Until 2008)
- Spouse: Leola Christion
- Education: Clark College

Military service
- Allegiance: United States
- Branch/service: United States Army
- Years of service: 1945–1946

James Edward "Billy" McKinney (February 23, 1927 – July 15, 2010) was an American politician from the U.S. state of Georgia. McKinney served as a Democrat in the Georgia House of Representatives from 1973 until 2003. He was also the father of former Georgia congresswoman and Green Party presidential candidate Cynthia McKinney.

== Early life ==
McKinney was born in Abbeville in Wilcox County, Georgia. His mother, Ann Turner Lewis, was a jazz singer, and his father, who he reportedly only met once, was a saxophone player. He attended Booker T. Washington High School and Clark College, a historically black college. He became a decorated veteran of the United States Army. He was credited with integrating the Atlanta Police Department and spearheading the efforts of the Afro-American Police League.

McKinney was reportedly arrested in Florence, South Carolina, after returning from his military service and being on a railroad trip back to Georgia, due to him or one of his mates drinking from a segregated water fountain.

== Career ==
McKinney served as a Democrat in the Georgia House of Representatives from 1973 until 2003. In 2008 he joined the Green Party and cast delegate votes for their presidential nominee.

In 1970, McKinney unsuccessfully ran for the Fulton County Commission, receiving 33.1 percent of the vote.

In August 1972, prior to getting elected into office, McKinney filed a lawsuit challenging Georgia's property tax school funding, describing it as discriminatory and as violating the Equal Protection Clause.

In 1974, McKinney successfully pushed through a bill that made carrying a gun without a license a felony; he stated, "We have lost our youth to Super Fly", referring to young people who "don't have respect for laws, for other people or for their parents". In 1975, McKinney criticized gun control legislation, instead claiming that harsher sentences for crimes involving guns was needed and that police should focus more on those crimes. In 1976, McKinney had intended to re-introduce the Equal Rights Amendment, although he was asked not to by female lawmakers as the amendment had previously failed in the legislature. In 1981, he acted as co-chairman of the campaign of Sidney Marcus for Mayor of Atlanta. Marcus was a prominent Jewish leader; his opponent was the well-known African-American politician Andrew Young. McKinney's choice antagonized much of the African-American community in Atlanta. During a 1982 special general election, McKinney unsuccessfully ran as an independent candidate in Georgia's fifth congressional district; he criticized the Reagan administration, claiming "His policies and programs are anti-people and anti-poor." He received 13.7 percent of the vote.

During the 1987 legislative session, according to The Atlanta Constitution, McKinney introduced a bill that would "legalize sodomy between men and women" and pushed legislation that would "allow health officials to examine a suspected AIDS victim under a court order." He also introduced a bill that would allow individual counties to legalize bets on dog or horse racing. In 1988, his daughter Cynthia, in contrast to herself, described McKinney as a "gay basher"; he denied the label, while also stating, "I simply have no respect for the gay community and I am repulsed by their lifestyle."

=== Controversies ===
McKinney was known as a politician who did not shy away from controversy. In 1976, it was reported that McKinney "had to be physically restrained" after he "threw a punch" at fellow representative J. C. Daugherty; the incident took place while they were discussing a welfare question in the proposed state budget. The day after, McKinney said they had apologized to each other. In August 1993, gay rights advocate Annie Archbold accused McKinney of punching her in the mouth outside of the Atlanta City Council. McKinney denied the accusation. In December 1994, McKinney was fined $500 for insulting and threatening congressman Gary Franks, after Franks had testified on behalf of a group of white plaintiffs who had accused the 11th Congressional District in Georgia of being unfairly drawn in favor of black voters. In 1995, Dan Lakly, a white state representative, accused McKinney of threatening him with a pocketknife during an argument; McKinney denied the allegation, and two other eyewitnesses denied seeing a knife.

In October 1996, McKinney apologized and resigned from his daughter's congressional campaign after he had called her opponent a "racist Jew".

His daughter Cynthia had a contentious relationship with the American Israel Public Affairs Committee (AIPAC). In 2002, when asked about his daughter using an old endorsement in her primary campaign, he said that the endorsement would not matter because "Jews have bought everybody. Jews. J-E-W-S." In that 2002 election, McKinney lost his seat in the Georgia House of Representatives, and his daughter lost her congressional seat.

== Death ==
Billy McKinney died on July 15, 2010, at the age of 83 in his southwest Atlanta home after a long struggle with cancer. He was in hospice care. His wife Leola and friends were with him at the time of death.

A portion of Interstate 285 is known in his honor as the "James E. "Billy" McKinney Highway" between I-20 in northwest Atlanta and I-75 near Cumberland Mall.
