= Pat Schroeder =

American politician (1940–2023)

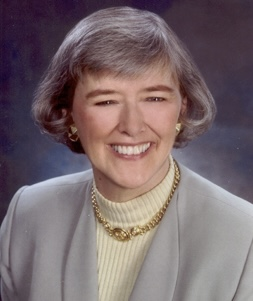
- Schroeder in 1993

Member of the U.S. House of Representatives from Colorado's 1st district
- In office January 3, 1973 – January 3, 1997
- Preceded by: Mike McKevitt
- Succeeded by: Diana DeGette

Personal details
- Born: Patricia Nell Scott; July 30, 1940 Portland, Oregon, U.S.
- Died: March 13, 2023 (aged 82) Celebration, Florida, U.S.
- Party: Democratic
- Spouse: James Schroeder (m. 1962)
- Children: 2
- Education: University of Minnesota (BA); Harvard University (JD)

Patricia Nell Scott "Pat" Schroeder (July 30, 1940 – March 13, 2023) was an American politician who represented Colorado's 1st congressional district in the United States House of Representatives from 1973 to 1997. A Democrat, Schroeder was the first female U.S. Representative elected from Colorado and ran for president in 1988.

== Early years ==
Patricia Nell Scott was born on July 30, 1940 in Portland, Oregon, the daughter of Bernice (Scott), a first-grade teacher, and Lee Combs Scott, a pilot who owned an aviation insurance company. She moved to Des Moines, Iowa, with her family as a child and earned her airman certificate when she was 15. After graduating from Theodore Roosevelt High School in 1958, she left Des Moines and attended the University of Minnesota, where she majored in history. Schroeder was a member of Chi Omega sorority. She graduated with a Bachelor of Arts degree in 1961 and earned a Juris Doctor degree from Harvard Law School in 1964.

On August 18, 1962, she married Jim Schroeder, a Harvard Law School classmate. They moved to Denver and Jim joined a law firm. They had two children, Scott William (born 1966) and Jamie Christine (born 1970). Schroeder worked for the National Labor Relations Board from 1964 to 1966. She worked for Planned Parenthood as a legal counsel and taught in Denver's public schools.

== U.S. Representative ==
=== Campaigns ===
In 1970, Schroeder's husband Jim ran for a seat in the Colorado General Assembly and lost by only 42 votes. In the same election, 20-year Democratic incumbent Byron Rogers of Colorado's 1st congressional district, based in Denver, lost a primary challenge to more liberal Craig Barnes, and Republican Mike McKevitt won the general election. Ahead of the 1972 election, Jim had asked a man who had declined to run for Congress if his wife would run, to which the man had asked him back: "What about yours?" While intended as an unserious comment, it convinced Schroeder to consider a political career, and she decided to run for the seat on a platform of opposition to the Vietnam War.

Considered a long-shot candidate, Schroeder received no support from the Democratic National Committee and women's groups. Nevertheless, with overconfident McKevitt staying in Washington until the last week of the campaign, Schroeder's message of war, environment, and childcare led to her winning by just over 8,000 votes amid Richard Nixon's massive landslide that year. At age 32, Schroeder was the second youngest woman ever elected to Congress. McKevitt, previously the Denver District Attorney, had been the first Republican to represent the district, regarded as the most Democratic in the Rockies, since Dean M. Gillespie in 1947. However, the district reverted to form, and she was elected 11 more times. She faced just one remotely close contest after her initial run, when she was held to 53 percent of the vote—the only time she would drop below 58 percent.

In 1984, Schroeder was mentioned as a possible running mate for former Vice President Walter Mondale, but the nomination went to Rep. Geraldine Ferraro of New York, who had half Schroeder's tenure in the House. Years later, Schroeder submitted a Freedom of Information Act request for her FBI file and discovered that she and her staff had been under surveillance during her first congressional campaign. She learned that the FBI had recruited her husband's barber as an informant, and paid a man named Timothy Redfern to break into her home and steal "such all-important secret documents as my dues statement from the League of Women Voters and one of my campaign buttons", demonstrating to her "how paranoid J. Edgar Hoover and his agency were."

=== Tenure ===
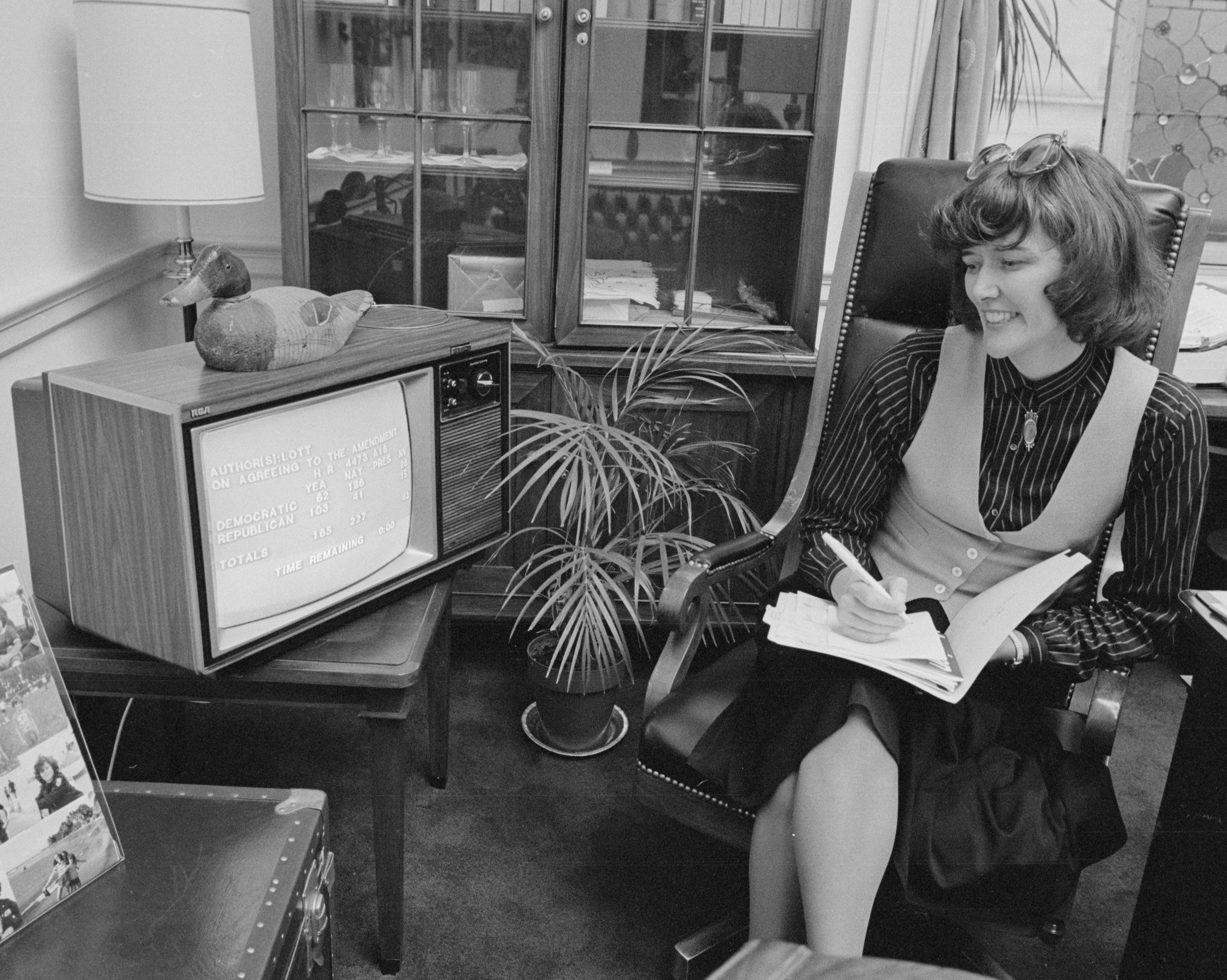
Schroeder watching the results of a house vote on a TV in her office, 1979

While in Congress, she became the first woman to serve on the House Armed Services Committee, where she advocated for arms control and reduced military spending. She was also a member of the original Select Committee on Children, Youth, and Families that was established in 1983. Schroeder was known during her early tenure in Congress for balancing her congressional work with motherhood, even bringing diapers to the floor of Congress. Her advocacy on work-family issues led Schroeder to become a prime mover behind the Family and Medical Leave Act of 1993 and the 1985 Military Family Act. Schroeder was also involved in reform of Congress itself, working to weaken the long-standing control of committees by their chairs, sparring with Speaker Carl Albert over congressional "hideaways", and questioning why Congress members who lived in their offices should not be taxed for the benefit.

Schroeder styled herself as a "fiscally conservative liberal". In 1981, she voted against Reagan's tax cuts, as she thought the country could not afford it; she was against the 1986 tax-reform bill, favoring more progressive rates. In 1986 she had a 95% rating from Americans For Democratic Action and was also ranked by the National Taxpayers Union as more fiscally conservative than Jack Kemp. In 1989, she voted against George H. W. Bush's administration more than any House member (79 percent), and often did not vote with fellow Democrats on "party unity" votes.

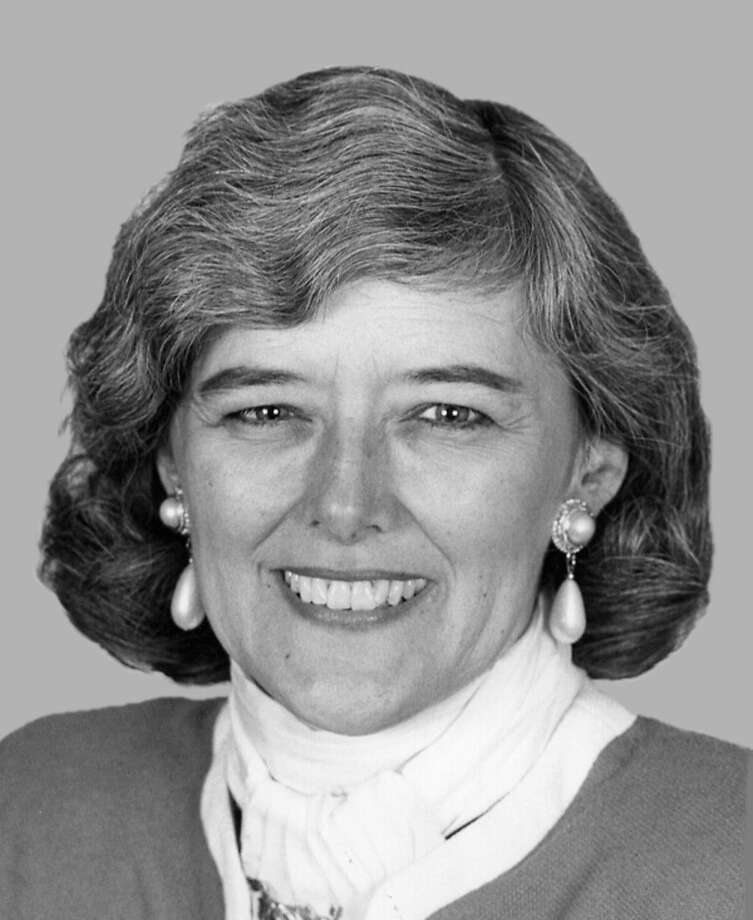
Schroeder in 1993

The Washington Post remarked that Schroeder was "known for her barbed wit", and many of her comments and quips were singled out for media attention during her career. She recalls that "John Wayne gave me a silver cigarette lighter during the Vietnam War that said 'Fuck Communism' on it. I didn't know how to do that. I still don't." She coined the phrase "Teflon President" to describe Ronald Reagan and his popularity even amid scandal; the idea came to her when she was frying eggs in a Teflon pan. Author Rebecca Traister recalled that Schroeder responded to concerns about balancing political life with motherhood by saying "I have a brain and a uterus, and they both work." In a 1995 exchange, after Representative Duke Cunningham told Rep. Bernie Sanders to "sit down, you socialist", during a debate in which Sanders and Schroeder both objected to homophobic comments Cunningham made, Schroeder asked, "Parliamentary inquiry, Mr. Chairman—do we have to call the Gentleman a gentleman if he's not one?"

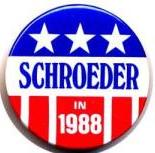
A button from Schroeder's 1988 presidential campaign

She chaired the 1988 presidential campaign of Gary Hart in 1987 until his withdrawal, at which point she strongly considered entering the race, before announcing she would not in a tearful press conference on September 29, 1987. Schroeder's emotional demeanor sparked backlash from across the political spectrum, with conservatives dismissing her behavior, and feminist commentators feeling it made women politicians look less serious. In 2007, 20 years later, she said that she still received hate mail about the press conference, mostly from women, and said that it exposed a double standard for men and women in politics. She remarked, "Guys have been tearing up all along and people think it's marvelous", she said, citing episodes dating back to Ronald Reagan; but for female candidates, it remains off-limits. In 1989, she wrote a book titled Champion of the Great American Family: A Personal and Political Book that discussed her own personal story and legislative efforts to enact policy on family issues such as parental leave, child care, family economics, and family planning.

Future Japanese prime minister Sanae Takaichi also served as a Congressional Fellow for Schroeder.

Schroeder did not seek re-election in 1996, citing dissatisfaction with the House's Republican majority. She was succeeded by Colorado state house minority whip Diana DeGette, a fellow Democrat. In her farewell press conference, she joked about "spending 24 years in a federal institution", and titled her 1998 memoir, 24 Years of House Work...and the Place Is Still a Mess.

== Publishing industry career ==
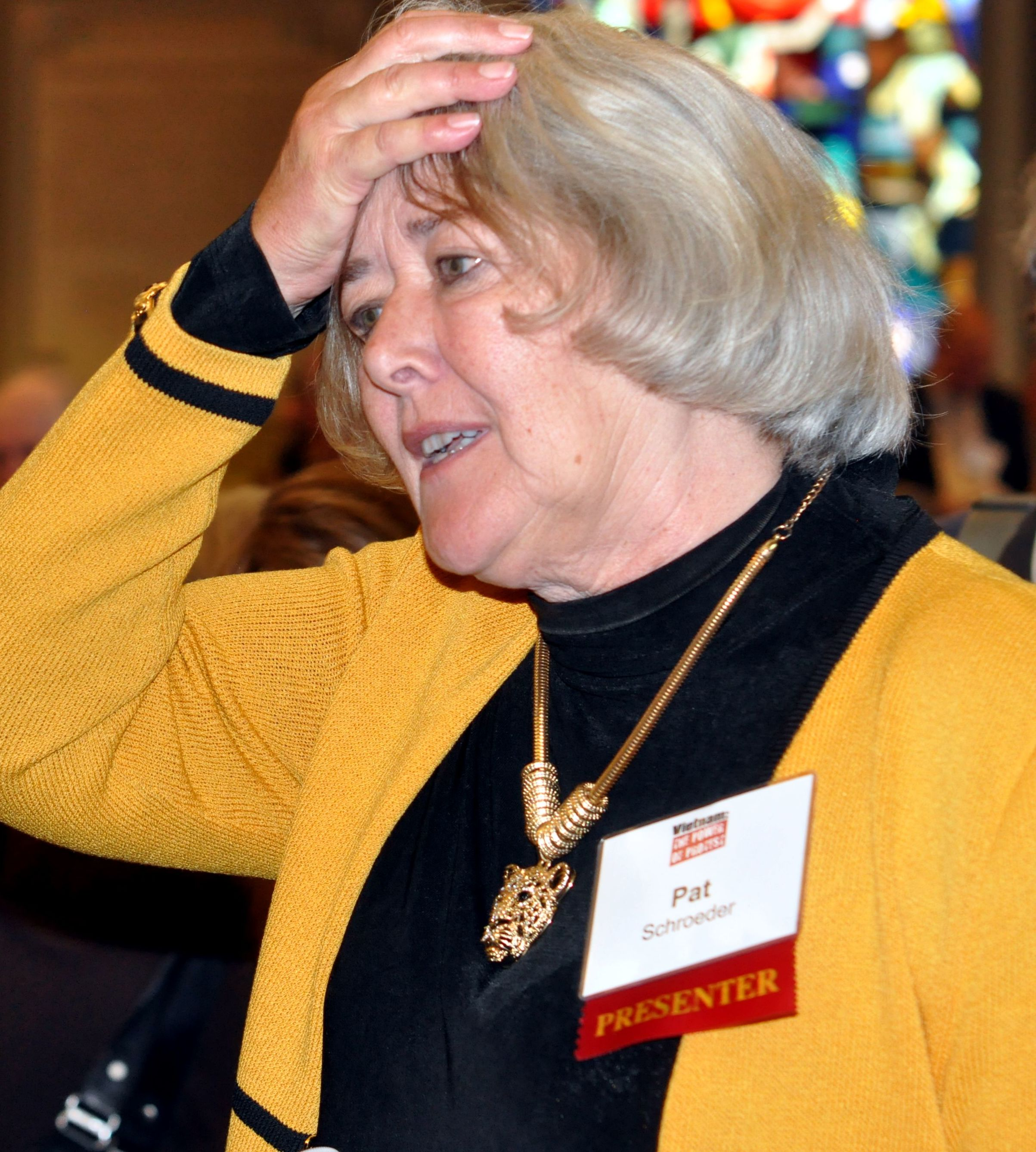
Schroeder at an event at New York Avenue Presbyterian Church in Washington, D.C., May 2015

Schroeder was named president and CEO of the Association of American Publishers in 1997 and served in the post for 11 years. She advocated for stronger copyright laws, supporting the government in Eldred v. Ashcroft, and opposing Google's plan to digitize books and post limited content online. She also criticized libraries for distributing electronic content without compensation to publishers, writers, and others in the publishing industry, telling The Washington Post, "They aren't rich... they have mortgages." She was a member of the National Leadership Advisory Group for Braille Literacy, encouraging publishers to make books more accessible to blind people and people with other reading difficulties. She also sat on the panel of judges for the PEN / Newman's Own Award.

Schroeder narrated a children's story, "The House that Went on Strike", which was released as a smartphone app in 2012. She wrote about her experience narrating the story and offered her perspective about kids book apps in a July 24, 2012, column in The Huffington Post. Additionally, Schroeder and the book were featured in a profile in Wired.

== Later life ==
After her tenure at AAP, Schroeder and her husband moved to Celebration, Florida, a master-planned community built by the Walt Disney Company. She was an acquaintance of former Disney CEO Michael Eisner, who helped facilitate the move. In 2010, the city was within the state's 8th congressional district, and Schroeder endorsed Democratic Rep. Alan Grayson for re-election to Congress, citing his stance on women's issues. Grayson lost his re-election campaign. She endorsed him again ahead of the 2012 congressional elections and Grayson won the re-election campaign.

Schroeder sat on the board of the League of Women Voters of Florida. She was also a supporter of the Campaign for the Establishment of a United Nations Parliamentary Assembly, an organization which advocates for democratic reformation of the United Nations.

== Death and burial ==
On March 13, 2023, Schroeder died from complications of a stroke at a hospital in Celebration, Florida, at age 82. She once quipped that she wanted a brick to be made from her cremated remains to hold doors open for other women. Her remains were interred at the historic Congressional Cemetery in Washington, D.C.

== Cultural references, influence, and awards ==
In 1979, the Supersisters trading card set was produced and distributed; one of the cards featured Schroeder's name and picture. Schroeder was inducted into the Colorado Women's Hall of Fame in 1985. She was inducted into the National Women's Hall of Fame in 1995. In 1988, she was parodied in a Saturday Night Live skit in which she was portrayed by Nora Dunn as the moderator of a Republican Primary debate. At the start of the skit the character makes a humorous reference to Schroeder's tearful withdrawal as a Democratic candidate for president in 1987. Along with Dunn in the skit were Dana Carvey (portraying George Bush), Dan Aykroyd (Bob Dole), Phil Hartman (Jack Kemp), Al Franken (Pat Robertson) and Kevin Nealon (Pete du Pont). During the 1995 budget debates, after Democrats claimed that Social Security payments would leave seniors with no choice but to eat dog food, Rush Limbaugh said in jest that he was going to get his mother a can opener. Schroeder denounced Limbaugh's remark on the floor of the House.

Schroeder contributed the piece "Running for Our Lives: Electoral Politics" to the 2003 anthology Sisterhood Is Forever: The Women's Anthology for a New Millennium, edited by Robin Morgan. She was honored by the National Research Center for Women & Families in 2006 for her lifetime of achievements with a Foremother Award. She was elected to the Common Cause National Governing Board in 2010. In April 2015, the visitor center at the Rocky Mountain Arsenal Wildlife Refuge was named in honor of Schroeder for her relentless work in Congress investigating the Rocky Mountain Arsenal's nerve gas stores and fighting for their clean-up.

Schroeder was portrayed by Jan Radcliff in the 2016 HBO film Confirmation. In 1988, a 26-year-old Sanae Takaichi, the future Prime Minister of Japan, worked as an intern for Schroeder for 8 months. For years, Takaichi kept a photo of Ms. Schroeder in her office, next to a portrait of Margaret Thatcher, the former British prime minister, her other hero.

== Electoral history ==
Patricia Schroeder electoral history

1972 United States House of Representatives elections, Colorado's 1st district
Party	Candidate	Votes	%
Democratic	Pat Schroeder	101,832	51.56%
Republican	Mike McKevitt (incumbent)	93,733	47.46%
Raza Unida	Maria Pauline Serna	1,629	0.82%
Socialist Workers	Fern Gapin	301	0.15%
Majority		8,099	4.10%
Total votes		197,495	100%
Democratic gain from Republican			

1974 United States House of Representatives elections, Colorado's 1st district
Party	Candidate	Votes	%
Democratic	Pat Schroeder (incumbent)	94,583	58.48%
Republican	Frank Southworth	66,046	40.84%
American	Elmer B. Sachs	1,105	0.68%
Majority		27,637	17.64%
Total votes		161,734	100%
Democratic hold			

1976 United States House of Representatives elections, Colorado's 1st district
Party	Candidate	Votes	%
Democratic	Pat Schroeder (incumbent)	103,037	53.22%
Republican	Don Friedman	89,384	46.17%
Socialist Workers	Priscilla Schenk	681	0.35%
U.S. Labor	Lann Meyers	508	0.26%
Majority		13,653	7.05%
Total votes		193,610	100%
Democratic hold			

1978 United States House of Representatives elections, Colorado's 1st district
Party	Candidate	Votes	%
Democratic	Pat Schroeder (incumbent)	82,742	61.46%
Republican	Gene Hutcheson	49,845	37.02%
Socialist Workers	Susan Lorraine Adley	2,043	1.52%
Majority		32,897	24.44%
Total votes		134,630	100%
Democratic hold			

1980 United States House of Representatives elections, Colorado's 1st district
Party	Candidate	Votes	%
Democratic	Pat Schroeder (incumbent)	107,364	59.77%
Republican	Naomi Bradford	67,804	37.75%
Libertarian	John Mason	3,888	2.16%
Socialist Workers	Harold Sudmeyer	566	0.32%
Majority		52,355	25.68%
Total votes		179,622	100%
Democratic hold			

1982 United States House of Representatives elections, Colorado's 1st district
Party	Candidate	Votes	%
Democratic	Pat Schroeder (incumbent)	94,969	60.26
Republican	Arch Decker	59,009	37.44
Libertarian	Robin White	3,619	2.30
Majority		35,960	22.82
Total votes		157,597	100
Democratic win (new boundaries)			

1984 United States House of Representatives elections, Colorado's 1st district
Party	Candidate	Votes	%
Democratic	Pat Schroeder (incumbent)	126,348	61.97
Republican	Mary Downs	73,993	36.29
Socialist Workers	Cathy Emminizer	1,846	0.91
Libertarian	Dwight Filley	1,686	0.83
Majority		52,355	25.68
Total votes		203,873	100
Democratic hold			

1986 United States House of Representatives elections, Colorado's 1st district
Party	Candidate	Votes	%
Democratic	Pat Schroeder (incumbent)	106,113	68.37
Republican	Joy Wood	49,095	31.63
Majority		57,018	36.74
Total votes		155,208	100
Democratic hold			

1988 United States House of Representatives elections, Colorado's 1st district
Party	Candidate	Votes	%
Democratic	Pat Schroeder (incumbent)	133,922	69.93
Republican	Joy Wood	57,587	30.07
Majority		76,335	39.86
Total votes		191,509	100
Democratic hold			

1990 United States House of Representatives elections, Colorado's 1st district
Party	Candidate	Votes	%
Democratic	Pat Schroeder (incumbent)	82,176	63.71
Republican	Gloria Gonzales Roemer	46,802	36.29
Majority		35,374	27.42
Total votes		128,978	100
Democratic hold			

1992 United States House of Representatives elections, Colorado's 1st district
Party	Candidate	Votes	%
Democratic	Pat Schroeder (incumbent)	156,629	68.84
Republican	Raymond Diaz Aragon	70,902	31.16
Majority		85,727	37.68
Total votes		227,531	100
Democratic win (new boundaries)			

1994 United States House of Representatives elections, Colorado's 1st district
Party	Candidate	Votes	%
Democratic	Pat Schroeder (incumbent)	93,123	59.98
Republican	William F. Eggert	61,978	39.92
Write-in		154	0.10
Majority		31,145	20.06
Total votes		155,255	100
Democratic hold			

== Books ==
- Schroeder, Pat. 24 Years of Housework...and the Place Is Still a Mess: My Life in Politics. Kansas City: Andrews McMeel Publishing, 1998.
- Schroeder, Pat. (with Andrea Camp and Robyn Lipner) Champion of the Great American Family: A Personal and Political Book. New York: Random House, 1989.

== See also ==
- Women in the United States House of Representatives

U.S. House of Representatives
Preceded by Mike McKevitt	Member of the U.S. House of Representatives from Colorado's 1st congressional district 1973–1997	Succeeded by Diana DeGette
Preceded by Elizabeth Holtzman	Chair of the Congressional Women's Caucus; 1979–1995	Succeeded by Connie Morella
Preceded by George Miller	Chair of the House Children Committee; 1991–1993	Position abolished
