= Cynthia McKinney =

American politician and activist (born 1955)

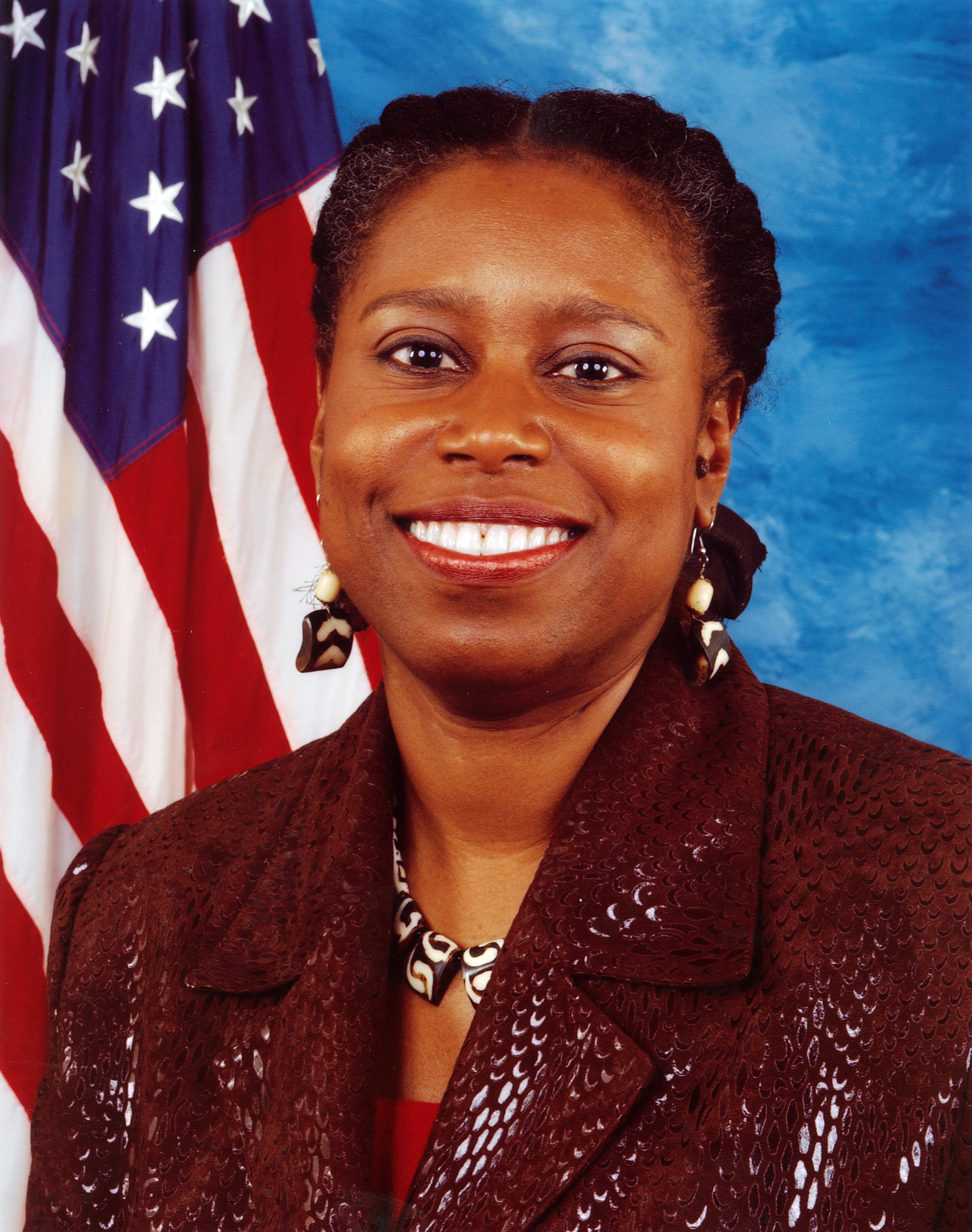

Member of the U.S. House of Representatives from Georgia
- In office January 3, 2005 – January 3, 2007
- Preceded by: Denise Majette
- Succeeded by: Hank Johnson
- Constituency: 4th district
- In office January 3, 1993 – January 3, 2003
- Preceded by: Constituency reestablished
- Succeeded by: Denise Majette
- Constituency: 11th district (1993–1997); 4th district (1997–2003)

Member of the Georgia House of Representatives from the 40th district
- In office January 9, 1989 – January 3, 1993
- Preceded by: Barbara Couch
- Succeeded by: Steven Clark

Personal details
- Born: Cynthia Ann McKinney; March 17, 1955 (age 71) Atlanta, Georgia, U.S.
- Party: Georgia Green Party (2007–present)
- Other political affiliations: Democratic (1973–2007); New Black Panther Party; Libertarian (2019); Workers World Party (2008)
- Spouse: Coy Grandison (divorced)
- Children: 1
- Relatives: Billy McKinney (father)
- Education: University of Southern California (BA); Tufts University (MA); Antioch University (PhD)
- McKinney's voice McKinney speaks on foreign policy and civil liberties following the September 11 attacks. Recorded September 21, 2001

Cynthia Ann McKinney (born March 17, 1955) is an American former politician. As a member of the Democratic Party, she served six terms in the United States House of Representatives. She was the first African American woman elected to represent Georgia in the House. She left the Democratic Party and ran in 2008 as the presidential nominee of the Green Party. She ran for vice president in 2020 after the Green Party of Alaska formally nominated her and draft-nominated Jesse Ventura for president.

McKinney served in the Georgia House of Representatives from 1988 to 1992. In the 1992 election, McKinney was elected in Georgia's newly re-created 11th district, and was re-elected in 1994. When her district was redrawn and renumbered due to the Supreme Court of the United States ruling in Miller v. Johnson, McKinney was elected from the new 4th district in the 1996 election. She was re-elected twice more without substantive opposition, but was defeated by Denise Majette in the 2002 Democratic primary. Majette's success has been attributed to crossover Republican voters who preferred Majette to McKinney.

McKinney was re-elected to the House in November 2004, following her successor's run for Senate. In Congress, she unsuccessfully tried to unseal FBI records on the assassination of Martin Luther King Jr. and the murder of Tupac Shakur. She continued to criticize the Bush administration over the 9/11 attacks. She supported anti-war legislation and introduced articles of impeachment against President Bush, Vice President Dick Cheney, and Secretary of State Condoleezza Rice.

McKinney sought re-election in 2006, but was defeated by Hank Johnson in the Democratic primary. In a March 29, 2006, Capitol Hill police incident, she struck a Capitol Hill Police officer for stopping her to ask for identification. McKinney left the Democratic Party in September 2007. She eventually sought and won the Green Party nomination in the 2008 presidential election, receiving 161,797 votes (0.12%) nationwide in the general election.

== Early life and education ==
Cynthia McKinney was born and raised in the affluent middle-class Historic Collier Heights area in Atlanta, Georgia, the daughter of Leola McKinney, a retired nurse, and Billy McKinney, a law enforcement officer and former Georgia State Representative.

McKinney was exposed to the Civil Rights movement through her father, an activist who regularly participated in demonstrations across the south. As a police officer, he challenged the discriminatory policies of the Atlanta Police Department, publicly protesting in front of the station, often carrying young McKinney on his shoulders. He was elected as a state representative. McKinney attributes her father's election victory, after several failed attempts, to the passage of the Voting Rights Act, which provided for federal oversight and enforcement of voting. Most blacks in the South had been disenfranchised by state legislative barriers since the turn of the 20th century.

McKinney earned a B.A. in international relations from the University of Southern California in 1978 and an M.A. in Law and Diplomacy from the Fletcher School of Law and Diplomacy at Tufts University in 1979. In 2015, McKinney completed her dissertation on Hugo Chavez and was awarded a Ph.D. in Leadership and Change by Antioch University.

Prior to entering politics, McKinney worked as a high school teacher and university professor. In 1984, she served as a diplomatic fellow at Spelman College in Atlanta, Georgia. She then taught political science at Agnes Scott College in Decatur and at Clark Atlanta University.

== Career and political activism ==
=== Georgia House of Representatives (1988–1992) ===
McKinney's political career began when her father, a representative in the Georgia House of Representatives, submitted her name as a write-in candidate for the Georgia state house in 1986. Despite the fact that she lived in Jamaica at the time, she received approximately 20% of the popular vote. In 1988, McKinney ran for the same seat and won, making the McKinneys the first father and daughter to simultaneously serve in the Georgia House of Representatives. In 1991, she decried the Gulf War in a speech on the House floor; many legislators left the chamber in protest of her remarks.

=== U.S. House of Representatives (1993-2003) ===
In 1992, McKinney was elected to the U.S. House of Representatives as the member of Congress from the newly created 11th District, a 64% African American majority district reaching from Atlanta to Savannah. She was the first African American woman to represent Georgia in the House. She was re-elected in 1994.

In 1995, the U.S. Supreme Court ruled in Miller v. Johnson that the 11th District was an unconstitutional gerrymander because the boundaries were drawn based on the racial composition of the constituents. McKinney's district was subsequently renumbered as the 4th and redrawn to take in almost all of DeKalb County, prompting outrage from McKinney. She asserted that it was a racially discriminatory ruling, given the fact that the Supreme Court had previously ruled that Texas's 6th District, which is 91% white, was unconstitutional. The new 4th, however, was no less Democratic than the 11th. McKinney was easily elected from this district in 1996. She was re-elected two more times with no substantive opposition.

In her first period in Congress, she served on several committees, including the House Committees on Foreign Affairs, Banking and Finance, and Armed Services. She eventually ascended to the top Democratic spot on the International Relations Subcommittee on International Operations and Human Rights, serving as ranking member. In that role, she became a frequent critic of American foreign policy. Examples include her vocal opposition to President Bill Clinton’s interventionist policies in Kosovo, U.S. sanctions against Iraq, and other policies related to the Middle East.

On October 17, 2001, McKinney introduced a bill calling for "the suspension of the use, sale, development, production, testing, and export of depleted uranium munitions pending the outcome of certain studies of the health effects of such munitions." The bill was cosponsored by Reps. Aníbal Acevedo Vilá, Puerto Rico; Tammy Baldwin, D-Wis.; Dennis Kucinich, D-Ohio; Barbara Lee, D-Ca.; and Jim McDermott, D-Wash.

==== Criticism of Al Gore ====
During the 2000 presidential campaign, McKinney wrote that "Al Gore's Negro tolerance level has never been too high. I've never known him to have more than one black person around him at any given time." Gore's campaign pointed out that its manager, Donna Brazile, was black.

McKinney chastised Gore for failing to support the U'wa people of Colombia trying to oppose petroleum drilling near them. In a press release issued on February 22, 2000, entitled "No More Blood For Oil," McKinney wrote that "Oil drilling on Uwa land will result in considerable environmental damage and social conflict which will lead to greater militarization of the region as well as an increase in violence." Addressing herself to Gore, she wrote, "I am contacting you because you have remained silent on this issue despite your strong financial interests and family ties with Occidental."

==== Objection to the 2000 presidential election ====
McKinney and other members of the House of Representatives objected to the 25 electoral votes from Florida which George W. Bush narrowly won after a contentious recount. Because no senator joined her objection, the objection was dismissed by Vice President Al Gore, who was Bush's opponent in the 2000 presidential election. Without Florida's electoral votes, the election would have been decided by the U.S. House of Representatives, with each state having one vote in accordance with the Twelfth Amendment to the United States Constitution.

==== September 11 attacks ====
McKinney gained national attention for her remarks following the September 11 attacks in 2001. She asserted that the United States had "numerous warnings of the events to come" and called for an investigation. She enquired in a radio interview: "What did this administration know and when did it know it?" She said that President George W. Bush may have been aware and allowed them to happen. She made allegations about the earlier president, George H. W. Bush: "It is known that President Bush's father, through The Carlyle Group, had—at the time of the attacks—joint business interests with the bin Laden construction company and many defense industry holdings, the stocks of which have soared since September 11." A spokesman for the Carlyle Group rejected her hypothesis. In a statement in April 2002, McKinney told The Washington Post: "I am not aware of any evidence showing that President Bush or members of his administration have personally profited from the attacks of 9–11. A complete investigation might reveal that to be the case."

In the month that followed the attacks, McKinney published an open letter to the Saudi Prince Alwaleed bin Talal. New York City mayor Rudy Giuliani had refused to cash a $10 million check written by Saudi Prince because of the Prince's suggestion that the attacks were an indication that the United States "should re-examine its policies in the Middle East and adopt a more balanced stand toward the Palestinian cause." In the open letter, she expressed her disappointment at Giuliani's action: "Let me say that there are a growing number of people in the United States who recognize, like you, that U.S. policy in the Middle East needs serious examination...Your Royal Highness, many of us here in the United States have long been concerned about reports by Amnesty International and Human Rights Watch that reveal a pattern of excessive, and often indiscriminate, use of lethal force by Israeli security forces in situations where Palestinian demonstrators were unarmed and posed no threat of death or serious injury to the security forces or to others."

==== 2002 primary defeat ====
In 2002, McKinney was defeated in the Democratic primary by DeKalb County judge Denise Majette. Majette defeated McKinney with 58% of the vote to McKinney's 42%.

McKinney protested the result in court, claiming that thousands of Republicans had voted in the Democratic primary, the real contest in the district, in revenge for her anti-Bush administration views and her allegations of voter fraud in Florida in the 2000 presidential election. Like 20 other states, Georgia operates an open primary: voters do not align with a political party when they register to vote and may participate in whichever party's primary election they choose. Thus, relying on the Supreme Court's decision in California Democratic Party v. Jones, which had held that California's blanket primary violated the First Amendment (despite the fact that the Court explicitly differentiated—albeit in dicta—the blanket primary from the open primary in Jones), on McKinney's behalf, five voters claimed that the open primary system was unconstitutional, operating in violation of the Equal Protection Clause of the Fourteenth Amendment, the associational right protected by the First Amendment, and various statutory rights protected by § 2 of the Voting Rights Act.

The district court dismissed the case, in the judgement stating the plaintiffs had presented no evidence in support of the 14th Amendment and Voting Rights Act claims, and lacked standing to bring the First Amendment claim. It interpreted the Supreme Court's Jones ruling to hold that the right to association involved in a dispute over a primary—and thus, standing to sue—belongs to a political party, not an individual voter. On appeal in May 2004, the Eleventh Circuit Court of Appeals upheld this result in Osburn v. Cox, assessing that not only were the plaintiffs' claims meritless, but the remedy they requested would likely be unconstitutional under the Supreme Court's decision in Tashjian v. Republican Party of Connecticut. On October 18, 2004, the Supreme Court brought an end to the litigation, denying certiorari without comment.

Other factors in McKinney's defeat included her allegations of Bush's involvement in 9/11, her opposition to aid to Israel, and a perceived support of Palestinian and Arab causes. On the night before the primary election, McKinney's father stated on Atlanta television that "Jews have bought everybody. Jews. J-E-W-S." Cynthia McKinney had been through a long contentious relationship with the American Israel Public Affairs Committee (AIPAC). Georgia political analyst Bill Shipp addressed McKinney's defeat saying: "voters sent a message: 'We're tired of these over-the-top congressmen dealing in great international and national interests. How about somebody looking out for our interests?'"

=== 2003–2005 ===
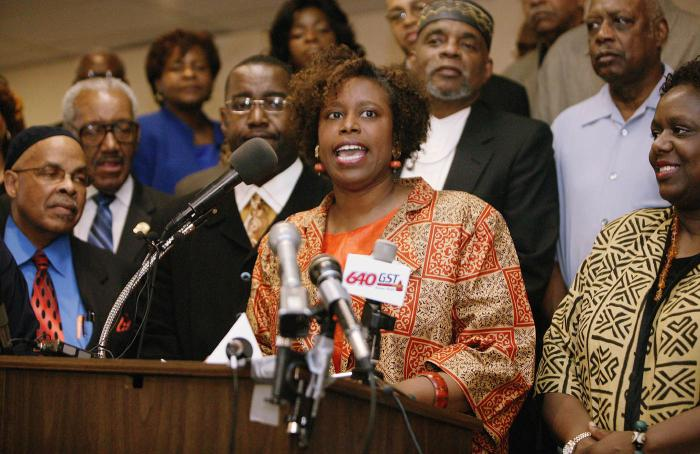
Cynthia McKinney speaking to the press in 2006

During 2003 and 2004, McKinney toured the US and much of Europe publicly speaking about her defeat, her opposition to the Iraq War, and the Bush administration.

In 2004, McKinney served on the advisory committee for the group 2004 Racism Watch.

Having made no secret that she wanted to return to Congress, McKinney turned down the Green Party's nomination for president in the 2004 presidential election.

=== Return to the U.S. House of Representatives (2005–2007) ===
Majette declined to run for re-election to the House, opting instead to become a candidate to replace retiring Senator Zell Miller, a conservative Democrat. According to a report in The New York Times, John Lewis believed it was "going to be a real battle" for McKinney to return to Congress. It was feared McKinney's previous comments would have a negative effect on her chances. Since it was taken for granted that victory in the Democratic primary was tantamount to election in November, McKinney's opponents focused on clearing the field for a single candidate who could force her into a runoff election.

McKinney hosted the first delegation of Afro-Latinos from Central and South America and worked with the World Bank and the U.S. State Department to recognize Afro-Latinos. She stood with Aboriginals against Australian mining companies. She was one of the 31 in the House who objected to the official allotment of the electoral votes from Ohio in the 2004 United States presidential election to incumbent George W. Bush.

==== Objection to the 2004 presidential election ====
McKinney was one of the 31 House Democrats who voted not to count the 20 electoral votes from Ohio in the 2004 presidential election, despite Republican President George W. Bush winning the state by 118,457 votes. Without Ohio's electoral votes, the election would have been decided by the U.S. House of Representatives, with each state having one vote in accordance with the Twelfth Amendment to the United States Constitution.

==== 9/11 Commission ====
On July 22, 2005, the first anniversary of the release of the 9/11 Commission Report, McKinney held a briefing on Capitol Hill about the attacks. The day-long briefing featured family members of victims, scholars, former intelligence officers and others who critiqued the 9/11 Commission account of 9/11 and its recommendations. The four morning panels addressed flaws, omissions, and a lack of historical and political analysis in the commission's report. Three afternoon panels critiqued the commission's recommendations in the areas of foreign and domestic policy and intelligence reform. An Atlanta Journal-Constitution editorial said that the purpose of the event was to discuss whether or not the Bush administration was involved in the 9/11 attacks, expressing surprise that McKinney was once again taking on the issue that was believed to have cost her House seat. The Journal-Constitution declined to publish McKinney's reply. The 9/11 Commission has sealed all the notes and transcripts of some 2,000 interviews, all the forensic evidence, and both classified and non-classified documents used in compiling its final report until January 2, 2009. McKinney's interest in 9/11 relates specifically to what she expresses as her opposition to excessive government secrecy, which she has challenged with numerous pieces of legislation.

McKinney has said that she "remain[s] hopeful that we will learn the truth" about 9/11 "because more and more people around the world are demanding it."

==== Hurricane Katrina activism ====
McKinney was an advocate for victims of 2005's Hurricane Katrina and a critic of the government's response to it. Over 100,000 evacuees from New Orleans and Mississippi relocated to the Atlanta area, and many have now settled there.

During the Katrina crisis, evacuees were turned away by Arthur Lawson's Gretna police when they attempted to cross the Crescent City Connection Bridge between New Orleans and Gretna, Louisiana. McKinney was the only member of Congress to participate in a march across the Crescent City Connection Bridge on November 7, 2005, to protest what had happened on that bridge in the aftermath of Hurricane Katrina.

In response, McKinney introduced a bill on November 2, 2005, that would temporarily deny federal assistance to the City of Gretna Police Department, Harry Lee's Jefferson Parish Sheriff's Office, and the Crescent City Connection Police Department, in the state of Louisiana. The bill was referred to the House Judiciary Subcommittee on Crime, Terrorism, and Homeland Security, but was not acted on. However, in August 2006, a grand jury began an investigation of the incident. On October 31, 2007, the Grand Jury ruled not to charge anyone. The Grand Jury accepted Gretna Police Chief Arthur Lawson's explanation, "Some of the people in the crowd acted aggressively and threatened to throw one of the officers off the bridge, the chief said. The shot was fired over the officer's shoulder and over the side of the bridge.

McKinney chose to be an active participant in the Select Bipartisan Committee to Investigate the Preparation for and Response to Hurricane Katrina, although the Democratic Party leadership called for Democratic members to boycott the committee. She submitted her own 72-page report. She sat as a guest along with only a few other Democrats. In questioning Department of Homeland Security Secretary Michael Chertoff, McKinney referred to a news story in which the owners of a nursing home had been charged with negligent homicide for abandoning 34 clients who died in the flood waters. McKinney asked Chertoff: "Mr. Secretary, if the nursing home owners are arrested for negligent homicide, why shouldn't you also be arrested for negligent homicide?"

The Congressional Black Caucus' Omnibus Bill (HR 4197) was introduced on November 2, 2005, to provide a comprehensive response to the Gulf Coast residents affected by Hurricane Katrina. The second title of the bill was submitted by McKinney, seeking a Comprehensive Environmental Sampling and Toxicity Assessment Plan, or CESTAP, to minimize harm to Gulf Coast residents from the toxic releases into the environment caused by the hurricane.

At the request of McKinney, the Select Bipartisan Committee to Investigate the Preparation for and Response to Hurricane Katrina, chaired by Thomas M. Davis, held a previously unscheduled hearing titled "Voices Inside the Storm" on December 6, 2005.

McKinney, in collaboration with Rep. Barbara Lee (CA), produced a "Katrina Legislative Summary," a chart summarizing House and Senate bills on Hurricane Katrina. On June 13, 2006, McKinney said on the House floor that only a dozen of the 176 Katrina bills identified on the chart had passed into law, leaving 163 bills stalled in committee.

On August 2, 2007, McKinney participated in a press conference in New Orleans to launch an International Tribunal on Hurricanes Katrina and Rita, which she described as an effort to seek justice for the victims of those hurricanes and their aftermath.

==== Anti-war and human rights legislation ====
Until 2000, McKinney served on the House International Relations Committee, where she was the highest-ranking Democrat on the Human Rights Subcommittee. McKinney worked on legislation to stop conventional weapons transfers to governments that are undemocratic or fail to respect human rights.

On November 18, 2005, McKinney was one of only three House members to vote for H.R. 571, introduced by Duncan Hunter, chairman of the House Armed Services Committee, on which McKinney sat. Hunter, a Republican, offered this resolution calling for an immediate withdrawal of U.S. forces in Iraq in place of John Murtha's H.J.Res. 73, which called for redeployment "at the earliest possible date." In her prepared statement, McKinney accused the Republicans of "trying to set a trap for the Democrats. A 'no' vote for this Resolution will obscure the fact that there is strong support for withdrawal of US forces from Iraq ... In voting for this bill, let me be perfectly clear that I am not saying the United States should exit Iraq without a plan. I agree with Mr. Murtha that security and stability in Iraq should be pursued through diplomacy. I simply want to vote 'yes' to an orderly withdrawal from Iraq."

==== Articles of impeachment introduced ====
At the end of the 2006 legislative session, McKinney introduced articles of impeachment against President George W. Bush as (H Res 1106), which made three charges against Bush:

- Failure to uphold the constitution, specifically that "George Walker Bush ... in preparing the invasion of Iraq, did withhold intelligence from the Congress, by refusing to provide Congress with the full intelligence picture that he was being given, by redacting information ... and actively manipulating the intelligence on Iraq’s alleged weapons programs by pressuring the Central Intelligence Agency and other intelligence agencies.
- Abuse of office and executive privilege, "obstructing and hindering the work of Congressional investigative bodies and by seeking to expand the scope of the powers of his office."
- Failure to ensure that laws are faithfully executed, specifically by a program of illegal domestic spying and circumvention of the FISA Act.

The second article also made charges against Vice President Dick Cheney alleging he manipulated intelligence in order to justify the Iraq War, and against Secretary of State Condoleezza Rice alleging that she knowingly made false statements concerning Iraq's weapons of mass destruction program.

McKinney's bill was abandoned when it failed to clear the House Committee on the Judiciary.

==== Capitol Police incident ====
On the morning of March 29, 2006, McKinney entered the Longworth House Office Building's southeast entrance and proceeded past the security checkpoint, walking around the metal detector. Members of Congress have identifying lapel pins and were not required to pass through metal detectors at the time. The officers present failed to recognize McKinney as a member of Congress because she was not wearing the appropriate lapel pin and had recently changed her hairstyle. She proceeded westward down the ground floor hallway and about halfway down the hallway was stopped by United States Capitol Police officer Paul McKenna, who states that he had been calling after her: "Ma'am, Ma'am!"; at that time it is reported that McKinney struck the officer. Two days later, Officer McKenna filed a police report claiming that McKinney had struck "his chest with a closed fist".

In the midst of a media frenzy, McKinney made an apology on the floor of the House of Representatives on April 6, 2006, neither admitting to nor denying the charge, stating only that: "There should not have been any physical contact in this incident."

Though McKinney was not indicted for criminal charges or subjected to disciplinary action by the House, the president of the Fraternal Order of Police said of Officer McKenna, "We're going to make sure the officer won't be harassed. We want the officer to be able talk to experts, who can look at his legal recourses, if he needed to."

==== Unintentional on-air criticism ====
In the wake of the March 2006 incident with the Capitol Police officer, McKinney was in the news, and her office invited the media to attend one of her monthly "District Days," where she spends one full day meeting with constituents to discuss issues of concern. At her April 23, 2006, "District Days" event, McKinney was being interviewed by WGCL's Renee Starzyk, who repeatedly questioned her about the March 29 scuffle with a Capitol police officer. Frustrated, McKinney stood up and apparently forgot she was still wearing the microphone. Her offscreen comments were captured on tape. She was heard saying, "Oh, crap, now you know what ... they lied to [McKinney's senior aide Coz Carson], and Coz is a fool." McKinney returned on screen with the microphone, this time with instructions on what parts of the interview the station was allowed to use: "anything that is captured by your audio ... that is captured while I'm not seated in this chair is off the record and is not permissible to be used ... is that understood?"

==== MLK Records Act ====
McKinney submitted to Congress two different versions of the same bill, the "MLK Records Act" (one in 2003, the other in 2005), which, if signed into law, would release all currently sealed files concerning the 1968 assassination of Martin Luther King Jr. These records were sealed in 1978 and are not due to be declassified until the year 2028. The 2005 version of the MLK Records Act, HR 2554 had 67 cosponsors by the time McKinney left office at the end of 2006. A Senate version of the bill (S2499) was introduced by Senator John Kerry and was co-signed by Sen. Hillary Clinton. The bill has also received numerous endorsements from former members of the House Select Committee on Assassinations.

==== Tupac Shakur Records Act ====
Documents relating to the death of rapper Tupac Shakur, in which McKinney took an active interest, would be released under another bill she would introduce. In a statement, McKinney explained her reason for the bill: "The public has the right to know because he was a well-known figure. There is intense public interest in the life and death of Tupac Shakur." Legislation demanding release of records is a more direct route than requesting their release through the Freedom of Information Act (FOIA).

==== 2006 primary and primary runoff ====
McKinney finished first in the July 18, 2006 Democratic primary, edging DeKalb County Commissioner Hank Johnson 47.1% to 44.4%, with a third candidate receiving 8.5%. However, as McKinney failed to get at least 50% of the vote, she and Johnson were forced into a runoff.

In the runoff of August 8, 2006, McKinney received about the same number of votes as in the July primary, even though there were about 8,000 more votes cast in the runoff than in the primary. Johnson won with 41,178 votes (59%) to McKinney's 28,832 (41%). McKinney's loss was attributed to a mid-decade redistricting, in which the 4th had absorbed portions of Gwinnett and Rockdale Counties, as well as her run-in with a police officer in the March 29, 2006, Capitol Hill police incident.

CNN reported that during her concession speech, McKinney hardly mentioned her opponent but praised the leftist political leaders elected in South America. She also questioned the efficacy of voting machines and criticized the media.

=== 2008 Green Party presidential candidacy ===
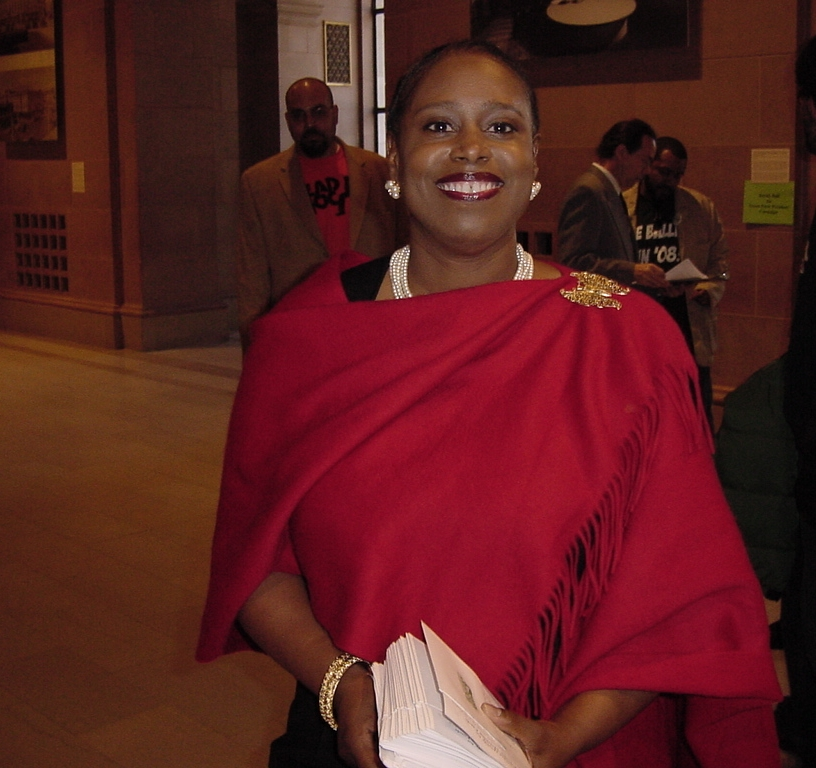
McKinney before speaking at the Green Party Presidential Debate in San Francisco, January 2008

McKinney was a Green Party candidate in the 2008 presidential election.

McKinney appeared at the July 15, 2007, Green Party National Meeting in Reading, Pennsylvania, where she suggested that the Green Party could become a progressive political force. "[T]he disgust of the American people with what they see before them—all they need is the blueprint and a road map. Why not have the Green Party provide the blueprint and the road map?"

At an August 27, 2007, peace rally in Kennebunkport, Maine, McKinney confirmed the depth of her disenchantment with the Democratic Party, urging San Francisco voters to replace Nancy Pelosi with antiwar activist Cindy Sheehan. On September 10, in a letter to the steering committee of the Green Party of the United States, McKinney stated she would not seek the Green Party nomination for president. However, in early October it appeared that McKinney was making moves toward declaring herself an official Green Party candidate.

On July 9, 2008, she named as her running mate journalist and community activist Rosa Clemente and clinched the party's nomination three days later at the 2008 Green Party National Convention.

On September 10, 2008, McKinney joined a press conference held by third-party and independent candidates, along with Ralph Nader, Chuck Baldwin, and initiator Ron Paul. The participants agreed on four basic principles:

- An early end to the Iraq War, and an end to threats of war against other countries including Iran and Russia.
- The safeguarding of privacy and civil liberties, including a call for the repeal of the Patriot Act, the Military Commissions Act, and FISA legislation
- No increase in the National Debt
- A "thorough investigation, evaluation and audit of the Federal Reserve System."

On November 4, 2008, McKinney received 161,797 votes, 0.12% of the total votes cast, placing her behind Obama, McCain, Nader, Barr, and Baldwin.

=== 2008–2011 ===
In March 2009, McKinney was present at a gathering of Holocaust deniers in London. In postings on the Green Party website, she said former Malaysian prime minister Mahathir Mohamad was "one of my heroes". She described David Pidcock as "my London friend". Pidcock is an individual whom the Southern Poverty Law Center and the Anti-Defamation League have described as an "anti-Semitic writer". In one post she related the conspiracy theory that individuals such as George Soros and Alan Greenspan (both Jewish) have plotted to create a "one-world government". In discussing this notion, she was drawing on a book entitled, The Shadow Money-Lenders by Matthias Chang, an advisor to Mahathir. McKinney praised the work.

==== Free Gaza Movement ====
On December 30, 2008, McKinney was aboard the ship Dignity when it attempted to enter the Gaza Strip, which had its coastal area declared a "closed military zone" by Israel, while on a humanitarian mission by the Free Gaza Movement from Cyprus. Aboard were physicians, medical supplies, and activists, including Caoimhe Butterly. The Israeli Navy confronted the ship at night in international waters. Members of the crew claimed that the ship was rammed, gunfire was directed at the water, and the ship was forced to dock in Lebanon after taking on water. Israeli officials claimed that the collision was accidental and occurred after the ship was informed they would not be allowed to enter Gaza and tried to outmaneuver the patrol boat; they decried McKinney's actions as being irresponsible and provocative for the sake of propaganda.

On June 30, 2009, McKinney was aboard the Greek-flagged Free Gaza Movement's ship Spirit of Humanity carrying 21 activists including Irish peace activist Mairead McGuire, medical supplies, a symbolic bag of cement, olive trees and toys, when it was seized by the Israeli Navy 18 mi (29 km) off the Gaza coast. It was unclear whether they were in international waters or in Gazan waters, which is subject to the Israeli blockade of Gaza. Although both the Cypriot and Israeli authorities were officially informed the destination was Gaza before the vessel's departure, according to the Cypriot government the ship "was given permission by the competent Authorities of the Republic of Cyprus to sail off the port of Larnaca in Cyprus on the basis of its declaration that its intended destination was the port of Port Said in Egypt."

McKinney was held at the Givon immigration detention center in Ramle, until her release on July 5. McKinney initially refused to sign the deportation papers because they were written in Hebrew and that the papers would require them to admit that they were in violation of Israel's blockade, which they denied. According to The Atlanta Journal-Constitution, Israeli officials stated that the "Palestinian Authority and the rest of the international community had agreed to the off-shore blockade to prevent arms smuggling into Gaza." The Palestinian Chronicle reports that such an agreement to the off-shore blockade never happened. "No Palestinians have agreed nor did the international community agree to a blockade of Gaza by land or Sea." On June 17, 2009, a group of United Nations agencies and non-governmental organizations (NGOs) called for an end to Israel's blockade of the Gaza Strip.

On July 7, 2009, McKinney was deported to the United States. The Israeli government indicated it would deliver the supplies via land.

==== Libya, Iran and Hugo Chávez ====
On May 21, 2011, McKinney appeared on state-run television in Libya and stated that United States participation in military intervention in the 2011 Libyan civil war was "not what the people of the United States stand for and it's not what African-Americans stand for". In the same interview, McKinney stated: "On a previous visit to Libya, I was able to learn about The Green Book, and the form of direct democracy that is advocated in The Green Book."

Around the same time, during her first visit to Iran, McKinney was interviewed by Iran's state-run channel, Press TV: "it is clear that the people of Iran have one thing in mind, and that is that they are a revolutionary state. And as a revolutionary state, they understand colonialism, neo-colonialism, and imperialism. They understand being under the foot of oppression and occupation—even if it is mental occupation—from an outside force or outside power, and that is what centers the resistance".

=== U.S. House of Representatives election, 2012 ===
McKinney announced in April 2012 that she would run for the 4th congressional district against Hank Johnson on the Green Party ticket. However, in August she failed to qualify for the ballot. Nevertheless, she received 58 write-in votes in the general election.

=== Later career and activities (2013–present) ===
In 2015, McKinney completed her dissertation on the transformational leadership of Hugo Chavez and was awarded a Ph.D. in Leadership and Change from Antioch University, and serves as an assistant professor at North South University.

In 2016, McKinney alleged Israeli involvement in the Nice truck attack and the Würzburg train attack, though she did not provide evidence for either claim. In 2020, she posted tweets questioning the number of Jews murdered in the Holocaust, leading to reports of Holocaust denial in The Algemeiner Journal and other outlets. In June 2021, she tweeted an image suggesting "Zionists" were responsible for the September 11 attacks. The post was condemned as antisemitic by Congressman Jamaal Bowman and the Anti-Defamation League (ADL).

McKinney has also drawn criticism for her political associations. In September 2023, she promoted a livestream featuring former Ku Klux Klan leader David Duke and Black nationalist Ayo Kimathi, an event the Green Party of Washington condemned while noting McKinney had not been affiliated with the party for several years. She participated in the 2023 Rage Against the War Machine rally via video, where she made claims of criminal elements within the U.S. government and that the Democratic Party had become a "war party".

Her other public statements have also generated controversy. In 2021, her claim that Hank Aaron's death was a result of the COVID-19 vaccine was identified by media outlets as misinformation. In 2024, she appeared in the film Occupied, produced by Stew Peters, in which she claimed that almost all political candidates in the US are expected to swear their allegiance to Israel. In the same film, she also made remarks supportive of Adolf Hitler’s prohibition of pornography.

== Awards and honors ==
On June 14, 2000, a part of Memorial Drive, a major thoroughfare running through her district, was renamed "Cynthia McKinney Parkway," but the naming has come under scrutiny since her primary defeat in 2006 as well as previous controversial statements that she had made.

== Personal life ==
In 2007, McKinney moved from her longtime residence in the Atlanta suburb of Stone Mountain to California. Her ex-husband is Jamaican politician Coy Grandison Sr. McKinney is a former Catholic and is now a practicing Muslim.

Since 2014, McKinney has taught as an assistant professor at North South University in Dhaka, Bangladesh.

== See also ==
- American Blackout documentary with focuses on Cynthia McKinney, and voter disenfranchisement
- List of African-American United States representatives
- List of federal political scandals in the United States
- Women in the United States House of Representatives

U.S. House of Representatives
New constituency	Member of the U.S. House of Representatives from Georgia's 11th congressional district 1993–1997	Succeeded by John Linder
Preceded by John Linder	Member of the U.S. House of Representatives from Georgia's 4th congressional district 1997–2003	Succeeded by Denise Majette
Preceded by Denise Majette	Member of the U.S. House of Representatives from Georgia's 4th congressional district 2005–2007	Succeeded by Hank Johnson
Party political offices
Preceded by David Cobb	Green nominee for President of the United States; 2008	Succeeded by Jill Stein
U.S. order of precedence (ceremonial)
Preceded by Scott Garrett as Former U.S. Representative	Order of precedence of the United States as Former U.S. Representative	Succeeded by Marty Meehan as Former U.S. Representative
