= Julius C. Daugherty Sr. =

American politician

Member of the Georgia House of Representatives
- In office 1966–1986

Personal details
- Born: January 4, 1924 Fulton County, Georgia, U.S.
- Died: January 31, 1987 (aged 63)
- Party: Democratic
- Spouse: Thomasina Cooper
- Education: Clark College; Howard University Law School

Julius C. Daugherty Sr. (January 4, 1924 – January 31, 1987) was an American politician. He served as a Democratic member of the Georgia House of Representatives or 20 years.

== Life and career ==
Daugherty was born in Fulton County, Georgia. He attended Clark College and Howard University Law School.

Daugherty served in the Georgia House of Representatives from 1966 to 1986.

Daugherty died on January 31, 1987, at the age of 63.

Thomasina Cooper Daugherty was his wife.

He was born in Atlanta. His father was a Baptist minister. He graduated from Clark College in 1948 and received a law degree from Howard University in Washington D.C. He was married to Thomasina Cooper Daugherty. They had five sons.

== Career ==
He advocated for Grady Hospital and fair hiring practices.

In 1965 he was elected to the Georgia House of Representatives and served until 1987. He served on Clark College's Board of Trustees.

A bridge was named in his honor.

== See also ==
- Georgia Legislative Black Caucus
- Atlanta Urban League
- Leroy Johnson (Georgia politician)
- Billy McKinney (politician)
