= United States House Select Committee on Children, Youth, and Families =

The United States House Select Committee on Children, Youth, and Families, was a committee of select members of the United States House of Representatives that was in existence from 1983 to 1993. The purpose of the committee was "to provide an ongoing assessment of the conditions of American children and families and to make policy recommendations to Congress and the public." The committee was created in 1983, and it was disbanded in 1993.

== Background and activities ==
Many United States Congress members recognized the need for the creation of a committee on children, youth, and families in order that the issues facing these individuals would be more adequately recognized and addressed.

=== Initial committee hearing of April 28, 1984 ===
Committee Chairman and Congress Member George Miller from California presided over the first hearing of the committee on April 28, 1984, in Washington, D.C.

During the introduction of the Committee hearing, given by Miller on April 28, 1984, he is quoted, stating, in part:

Never before has Congress taken upon itself the responsibility and initiative to confront comprehensively the issues affecting this constituency. Many people have joined together to help create what we believe to be a vitally important forum in Congress. I share that view, and I am sure each member of this committee, on both sides of the aisle, shares that view. For each of us has come to see the need for this committee and for the work we hope it will accomplish.

Many issues regarding this constituency were addressed during the initial hearing of the committee in 1984. The initial issues included remarks about the need for preventative interventions rather than therapeutic endeavors in relation to infant development; education's role in a society of learning; troubles that American families face; and suggestions to the committee from outside sources. During the hearing, the group, Save the Children, sponsored children to come to Washington, DC, and give testimony to the committee. Examined were economic consequences of compositional transformations within American families; as well as discussion regarding research that showed the significance "of parents' physical and emotional accessibility for the emotional health of children." Additional information provided included statements regarding "the importance of the traditional family in producing offspring with right character, on distortions of the ideal of equality, and on implications for public policy." Also included in the hearing was a short summary of issues that are related to government interventions. The hearing report, itself, includes 25 figures and tables associated with family and economic conditions; and an article assessing divorce and marriage data in the US. Further included in the hearing report are letters to President Ronald Reagan, written by children, relating to their views about improvements needed in family situations and treatment of children.

=== Committee hearing of April 22, 1987 ===
The hearing of the committee of April 22, 1987, focused on children who are included in states' foster care systems. During the hearing, Chairman George Miller identified several issues facing children who are in foster care, including neglect and abuse; poverty; teen pregnancy; and children being placed in foster care indefinitely and sometimes, in other states and/or hundreds of miles from their families of origin. Miller also discussed the need for improvements in the foster care system, including in relation to documenting and tracking the more than 500,000 children - as of 1975 - who were part of the foster care system.

Toward the close of his statement in the April 22, 1987 Committee hearing, Miller is quoted, saying:

We are going to make this system work. Today we are continuing the process of uncovering the shortcomings and putting the system back together so that it will serve the families and the children who depend upon it.

=== Committee activities of 1991 ===
In 1991, the committee held 11 hearings regarding the needs of children, youth, and families. There were many individuals who gave testimony to the committee in 1991, related to issues facing this constituency. In the committee's summary of activities for 1991, also included were "highlights of legislation affecting children and families," as well as factsheets. The legislative hearings of the committee focused on issues including "(1) reclaiming the tax code for American families; (2) generating innovative strategies for healthy infants and children; (3) community-based mental health services for children; (4) police stress and family well-being; (5) creation of a family-friendly workplace for fathers; (6) ways to help teenagers stay safe; (7) effects of noise on hearing loss in children and youth; (8) child abuse treatment and prevention in the 1990s; (9) National Children's Day; (10) comments of the Surgeon General on the prevention of underage drinking; and (11) automotive safety for American families."

== Original committee ==
The original committee of 1983 was chaired by Congress Member George Miller, and included many members of Congress. In addition to Miller, many members of Congress who comprised the committee were William Lehman from Florida; Patricia Schroeder from Colorado; Lindy Boggs from Louisiana; Matthew F. McHugh and Ted Weiss from New York; Jerry M. Patterson and Barbara Boxer from California; Barbara Mikulski from Maryland; Beryl Anthony, Jr. from Arkansas; Mickey Leland from Texas; Sander Levin from Michigan; Bruce Morrison from Connecticut; J. Roy Rowland from Georgia; Gerry Sikorski from Minnesota; and Alan Wheat from Missouri. Additional members who were part of the original Committee included Dan Marriott from Utah; Hamilton Fish, Jr., from New York; Dan Coats and Dan Burton from Indiana; Thomas J. Bliley, Jr. and Frank Wolf from Virginia; Nancy Johnson from Connecticut; John R. McKernan, Jr. from Maine; and Barbara Vucanovich from Nevada.

== Disbanding ==
Official documents provided by the committee and maintained in by the US Government Printing Office ceased to be created in 1993. By the close of 1993, the committee no longer existed.
