= 2006 Georgia's 4th congressional district election =

- November 7, 2006
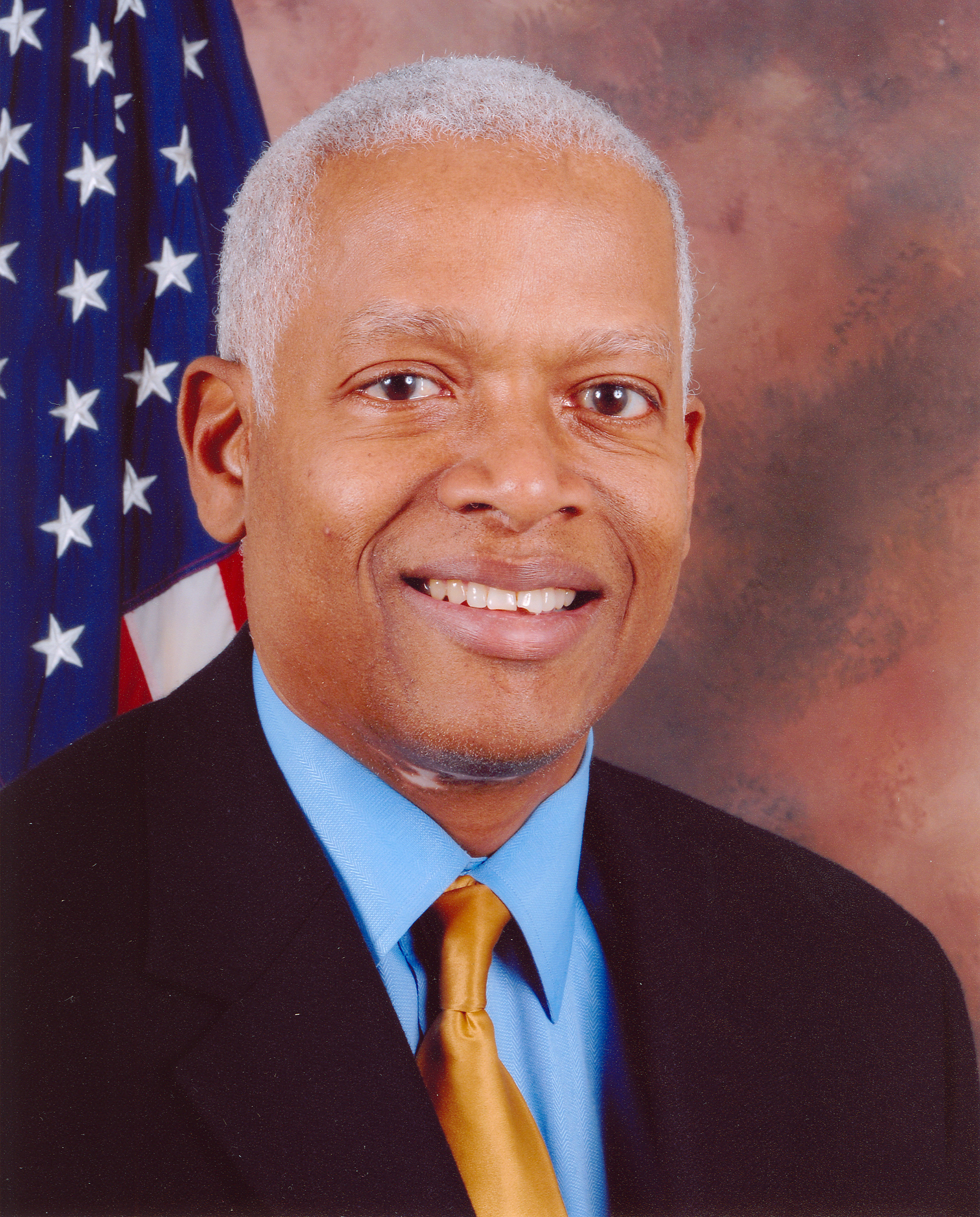

Nominee	Hank Johnson	Catherine Davis
Party	Democratic	Republican
Popular vote	106,352	34,778
Percentage	75.4%	24.6%
U.S. Representative before election
Cynthia McKinney
Democratic
Elected U.S. Representative
Hank Johnson
Democratic

The 2006 Georgia's 4th congressional district election was an election for the United States House of Representatives. The general election was held on November 7, 2006. However, the 4th was a heavily Democratic district, with the Democratic primary viewed as the more important contest. In that primary, DeKalb County Commissioner Hank Johnson upset the incumbent, Cynthia McKinney.

Johnson went on to defeat Republican Catherine Davis, a human resources manager and GOP activist, in November to become the district's Representative.

== Primary campaign ==
Johnson portrayed himself as the more reasonable Democratic Party candidate; an alternative to the highly controversial McKinney. On December 21, 2005, Johnson commented during the press conference announcing his decision to run, that "The Fourth District faces serious problems of traffic and transportation, public safety, healthcare and education. I'm a nuts-and-bolts public servant. My record speaks for itself. I am committed to getting results for those [who] made me their County Commissioner. I will bring that same approach to representing the District in the 110th Congress."

== Democratic primary election ==
McKinney finished first in the July 18, 2006, Democratic primary, edging Johnson, 47.1% to 44.4%, with a third candidate receiving 8.5%. However, because McKinney failed to get a majority of the votes, she and Johnson were forced into a runoff.

Georgia's 4th congressional district Democratic primary election, 2006
Party	Candidate	Votes	%
Democratic	Cynthia McKinney (incumbent)	29,216	47.1
Democratic	Hank Johnson	27,529	44.4
Democratic	John Coyne	5,253	8.5
Total votes		61,998	100

McKinney had been favored to win. Her narrow margin in the primary, and failure to get 50% of the vote surprised some observers. Those results focused attention on the challenger, Johnson, and changed the perception of the race. Voter interest increased with the realization of McKinney's vulnerability, and Johnson's level of support. Almost 62,000 people voted in the primary; slightly over 70,000 voted in the runoff.

== Democratic primary runoff campaign ==
Johnson continued to stress his ability to get along with people. He told a reporter for USA Today, "I'm going to be an effective legislator," and "I'm not going to be a divisive one."

Both campaigns went negative. McKinney criticized Johnson for receiving $16,000 in donations from Republicans. Johnson responded that he was a "lifelong Democrat" and that the money McKinney criticized was small compared to the $130,000 in donations he took in before the primary vote. Johnson pointed out that McKinney has received large donations from donors from New York and Los Angeles, while most of his support had come from within the Congressional district.

Johnson raised questions about McKinney's controversial confrontation with a U.S. Capitol police officer in Washington, DC. During the second debate on August 5, 2006, Johnson pointed to the Capitol Hill incident as an example of what he has called McKinney's embarrassing leadership in office. Johnson also raised questions about McKinney missing votes in Congress. He specifically asked about her missing a vote to extend the National Voting Rights Act of 1965: "If the Voting Rights Act is not important enough for you to show up, then what is important enough for you to show up?"

A reporter for the Atlanta Journal-Constitution, commenting on the appearance of Johnson and McKinney in the second debate, said that Johnson showed confidence and knowledge of the issues, while McKinney "seemed rattled and frustrated at times" and that she "refused to directly answer some questions from the panel."

In the period leading up to the primary election, McKinney had $282,000 in total campaign receipts compared to $170,000 for Johnson. Between the primary and the runoff, Johnson doubled his contributions; taking in nearly three times the amount that McKinney did during the same period.

=== Use of the internet and blogosphere ===
Johnson's aggressive use of the internet to court supporters and attract national attention to the race was noted by national political media. The National Journal wrote that of all Congressional candidates nationwide in 2006, "Johnson had the most unique blog strategy by far." In July, another National Journal article dubbed Johnson a "staple of the blogosphere."

Blogger Joe Gandelman wrote about Johnson's candidacy, driving traffic to his campaign web site. After he observed that Johnson was posting on multiple prominent political blogs, Gandelman wrote, "These are fascinating posts -- worth the attention of readers of all persuasions -- because they show a candidate taking full advantage of Internet technology to directly spread his word and also (not a small matter) a candidate who's offering voters a different style of representation."

The National Journal went on to tout Johnson's use of the internet to defeat McKinney as the number-three blog story of 2006.

=== Polls and predictions for the primary runoff ===
The first poll on the race was done right after the primary on July 26, 2006. The Atlanta Journal-Constitution reported that a poll by InsiderAdvantage "shows challenger Hank Johnson with a hefty lead over incumbent Cynthia McKinney in the Democratic runoff for the 4th District congressional race. The poll shows Johnson leading McKinney, 46 to 21 percent, with a third of voters undecided."

Insider Advantage took a second poll on July 31, 2006. Johnson still led McKinney, but by a smaller margin of 49 to 34 percent, with 17 percent undecided. InsiderAdvantage CEO Matt Towery commented that "There has been some shift in African American voters in McKinney’s direction. However, the black vote remains split with local black leaders endorsing Johnson, who is trouncing McKinney among eligible white voters.

A poll taken on August 3, 2006, indicated that Johnson was leading McKinney heading into the final weekend before the runoff election. The poll of 300 eligible voters found that Johnson's support was at 52 percent and McKinney's support was at 39 percent, the first time that a poll placed Johnson above the 50 percent level. The poll only had nine percent undecideds. Early voting in the Fourth Congressional District was high.

The last poll by InsiderAdvantage before the primary runoff election, taken on August 6, 2006, gave the impression that Johnson had strengthened his lead in the race against McKinney. The poll showed Johnson leading McKinney, 53 percent to 40 percent. Seven percent were undecided.

Based upon historical results in Georgia runoff elections, many experts in Georgia politics believed that Johnson was the favorite to win the runoff election. University of Georgia political science professor Charles Bullock said that McKinney would probably lose because historically most incumbents forced into a runoff in Georgia do. "There is blood in the water and the sharks are circling," Bullock concluded. Merle Black, a political science professor at Emory University in Atlanta, expressed a similar sentiment, "An incumbent who is forced into a runoff is a serious sign of weakness. Johnson’s vote will go up, he’ll raise a lot of money, and the momentum has gone over to Johnson.

== Democratic primary runoff election, August 2006 ==
On August 8, 2006, in the runoff, Johnson won a decisive victory:

Georgia's 4th congressional district Democratic primary election runoff, 2006
Party	Candidate	Votes	%
Democratic	Hank Johnson	41,178	58.8
Democratic	Cynthia McKinney (incumbent)	28,832	41.2
Total votes		70,010	100

In his victory speech, Johnson commented on the Democratic primary campaign and on future prospects: "“What we have done today is something that has been watched by the nation. It is clear, where most people have a low opinion of the work of our Congress, that they want to see things done differently."

During her concession speech, McKinney praised leaders in Cuba and Venezuela and blamed the media and electronic voting machines for her defeat.

== November general election ==
The 4th District is a 60% black-majority district, and is heavily Democratic, so Johnson was considered the overwhelming favorite going into the general election. Johnson defeated the GOP candidate, human resources manager Catherine Davis, in the November 7 general election, winning nearly 76% of the vote—one of the largest percentages for a Democrat in a contested election, and the largest in the history of the district.

Davis was the 2004 Republican nominee but lost to McKinney by nearly 30 percentage points. The district supported Democrat John Kerry for President that same year with 71 percent of the vote.

Georgia's 4th congressional district election results, 2006
Party	Candidate	Votes	%
Democratic	Hank Johnson	106,352	75.4
Republican	Catherine Davis	34,778	24.6
Total votes		141,130	100
Democratic hold			
Source: Georgia Secretary of State Archived 2007-06-14 at the Wayback Machine
