= Jacob Carruthers =

American historian and educator

Jacob Hudson Carruthers, Jr.
- Born: February 15, 1930; Dallas, Texas, US
- Died: January 4, 2004 (aged 73); Chicago, US
- Occupations: Educator, Egyptologist, Political Scientist, Historian, Researcher, Professor
- Organization(s): Kemetic Institute, ASCAC, Temple of African Community of Chicago
- Spouse: Ifé Carruthers

Jacob Hudson Carruthers, Jr. (February 15, 1930, in Dallas, Texas—January 4, 2004, in Chicago) was an African-centered historian and educator.

== Early Days and Education ==
Jacob Carruthers was born on February 15, 1930 in Dallas, Texas, and attended Phyllis Wheatley High School in Houston, TX before going to Samuel Huston College, where he earned a BA degree in 1950. In 1951, he joined the United States Air Force, and after serving, he achieved a master's degree in government from Texas Southern University in 1958. Carruthers became the first African-American student to complete a doctorate in political studies from the University of Colorado in 1966.

From 1961 to 1964 Carruthers taught political science at Prairie View College in Texas and later he taught at Kansas State College in Pittsburg, Kansas.

== Moving to Chicago and the Center for Inner City Studies ==
After two years of teaching political science at Kansas State College (1966–1968), Carruthers moved to Chicago, where he would live and work for the rest of his life. In 1968, Carruthers joined the Center for Inner City Studies of Northeastern Illinois University (NEIU). For the next thirty-two years, Carruthers taught history and education at the Center for Inner City Studies, playing a role in the development of graduate and undergraduate degrees in the Department of Inner City Studies Education (ICSE).

== Visiting Cheikh Anta Diop ==
In 1975, one year after Cheikh Anta Diop, an African academic and scientist, and his protégé and colleague Théophile Obenga successfully defended the African origin of ancient Kemet at the UNESCO symposium in Cairo, Carruthers visited Diop in Senegal. At this visit, Ifé Carruthers writes:

Diop impressed upon Dr. Carruthers the importance of the study of ancient Egypt and more importantly the need to center that study around the command of the Egyptian languages, commonly called hieroglyphics.

Returning from this meeting, Carruthers established the organizational base to centralize Kush and Kemet as the classical African civilizations upon which liberated African institutions would be built. Carruthers began to learn the ancient language of Kemet to have direct access to the ancient sources while urging others to do likewise.

== The Kemetic Institute and ASCAC ==
Carruthers created an African-centered context for the systematic studying of African history to raise African institutions from the rescued knowledge.

In 1978 Carruthers and the African-centered research team composed of A. Josef Ben Levi, Anderson Thompson, and Conrad Worrill founded the Kemetic Institute. This organization addressed the need for serious restoration-driven search by Africans on the Classical African civilizations of Kush and Kemet. Carruthers, as the founding director of the institute, clarified that the institution was to serve as the springboard for African-centered institution building by proving the knowledge-base from which other institutions could be nourished.

In February 1984, Carruthers, along with John Henrik Clark, Asa Grant Hilliard, Leonard Jeffries, Yosef Ben-Jochannan, and Maulana Karenga, founded the Association for the Study of Classical African Civilizations (ASCAC) at the First Annual Ancient Egyptian Studies Conference in Los Angeles, California, of which Carruthers was elected the first president.

== Personal life ==
Carruther was married to Mama Ifé Carruthers, with whom he had three sons, Jacob III, Darnell and Christopher, and a daughter, Tawakalitu Jogunosimi.

== Death ==
Jacob Carruthers died on January 4, 2004, of pancreatic cancer in his Chicago home at the age of 73.

== Bibliography ==
- Essays in Ancient Egyptian Studies. Los Angeles, CA: University of Sankore Press. 1984. ISBN 9780943412030.
- Intellectual warfare Third World Press. 1999. ISBN 9780883781609
- The Irritated Genie: An Essay on the Haitian Revolution. Kemetic Institute. 1985. ISBN 9780939539109.
- Maulana Karenga (ed., 1986. Kemet and the African Worldview: Research, Rescue and Restoration. University of Sankore Press.
- Mdw nt̲r. Karnak House. 1995. ISBN 9780907015772.
- Carruthers, Jacob H.; Harris, Leon C. (2002). African World History Project: The Preliminary Challenge. The Association for the Study of Classical African Civilizations.
