= Tiny Town (amusement park) =

Tiny Town & Railroad
- Interactive map of Tiny Town & Railroad
- Location: 6249 South Turkey Creek Road; Morrison, Colorado 80465, U.S.
- Coordinates: 39°36′13″N 105°13′25″W
- Opened: 1921
- Owner: Quaintance family
- Slogan: Have a big time in Tiny Town
- Operating season: daily Memorial Day - Labor Day, weekends in May and September

Attractions
- Total: 1
- Website: tinytownrailroad.com

Tiny Town & Railroad is a miniature village containing over 100 1/6 scale buildings and a 15 in (381 mm) gauge miniature railway close to Morrison, Colorado.

== History ==
George Turner, owner of Denver business Turner Moving & Storage and a friend of Buffalo Bill Cody, began building a miniature town for his daughter in 1915. Called Turnerville, he opened the site to the public in 1921.

Turnerville quickly became one of the state's most popular attractions, but it was plagued by damage from adjacent Turkey Creek flooding and a fire burned down the Indian pueblo in 1935. The train was added in 1939 and the name became Tiny Town.

On August 11, 2010 fifteen people were injured as a train entered a curve at the park going between 12 and 17 miles per hour (19 and 27 km/h), causing five of the six cars to tip over. An investigation determined the operator was not adequately trained in steam locomotive operation which resulted in confusion of the brake and throttle levers. The state fined Tiny Town $30,500 consisting of $1000 per incident the operator operated the train and $500 for not having documented training of emergency and safety procedures.

== See also ==
- Ridable miniature railway
