= George Miller (California politician) =

American politician (born 1945)

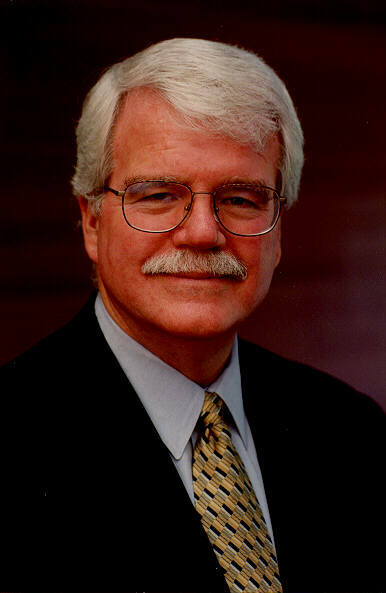

Chair of the House Education Committee
- In office January 3, 2007 – January 3, 2011
- Preceded by: Buck McKeon
- Succeeded by: John Kline

Chair of the House Natural Resources Committee
- In office May 4, 1991 – January 3, 1995
- Preceded by: Mo Udall
- Succeeded by: Don Young

Member of the U.S. House of Representatives from California
- In office January 3, 1975 – January 3, 2015
- Preceded by: Jerome Waldie
- Succeeded by: Mark DeSaulnier
- Constituency: 7th district (1975–2013); 11th district (2013–2015)

Personal details
- Born: May 17, 1945 (age 81) Richmond, California, U.S.
- Party: Democratic
- Spouse: Cynthia Caccavo
- Children: 2
- Relatives: George Miller Jr. (father)
- Education: Diablo Valley College; San Francisco State University (BA); University of California, Davis (JD)
- Miller's voice Miller opening a House Education Committee hearing on the proposed Employment Non-Discrimination Act of 2009. Recorded September 23, 2009

George Miller III (born May 17, 1945) is an American politician who served as a U.S. representative from California from 1975 to 2015. A member of the Democratic Party, he represented the state's 7th congressional district until redistricting in 2013 and 11th congressional district until his retirement. Miller served as Chairman of the House Natural Resources Committee from 1991 to 1995 and Chairman of the House Education and Labor Committee from 2007 until 2011.

== Education and early career ==
He was born in Richmond, California, the son of George Miller Jr., a leader of the liberal wing of the California Democratic Party at the time. He graduated from Diablo Valley Community College and San Francisco State University.

After his father died on New Year's Day 1969, Miller ran in a March 1969 special election to succeed him in California's 7th State Senate district, but Republican John A. Nejedly defeated him 57% to 42%.

He then attended the University of California, Davis School of Law (King Hall), where he received his Juris Doctor. Miller served as legislative assistant to California State Senate Majority Leader George Moscone before entering the United States House of Representatives.

== U.S. House of Representatives ==
=== Elections ===
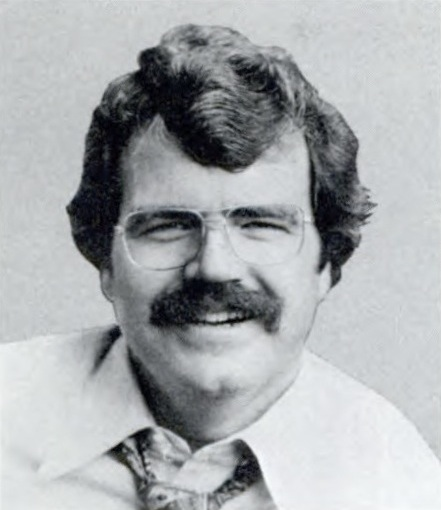
Miller's official portrait in the 95th Congress, 1977

In 1974, incumbent Democratic U.S. Representative Jerome Waldie gave up his seat to make an unsuccessful run for Governor of California. Miller decided to run for the open seat, which had been renumbered from the 14th congressional district to the 7th congressional district in a mid-decade redistricting. He won the primary with a plurality of 38%. In the general election, he defeated Republican Gary Fernandez 56% to 44%, the lowest winning percentage of his career. He went on to win reelection 18 times and never won with less than 60% of the vote.

On April 10, 1975, Miller walked out of the House chamber during President Ford's State of the Union Address when he requested military aid for South Vietnam.

2012

After redistricting, Miller's district was redrawn and renumbered the 11th. He ran against, and defeated, Republican Virginia Fuller in the general election.

In a 2012 campaign ad, Miller said that the main challenge the U.S. faces is the need “to correct the disparities that exist in our country.”

=== Tenure ===
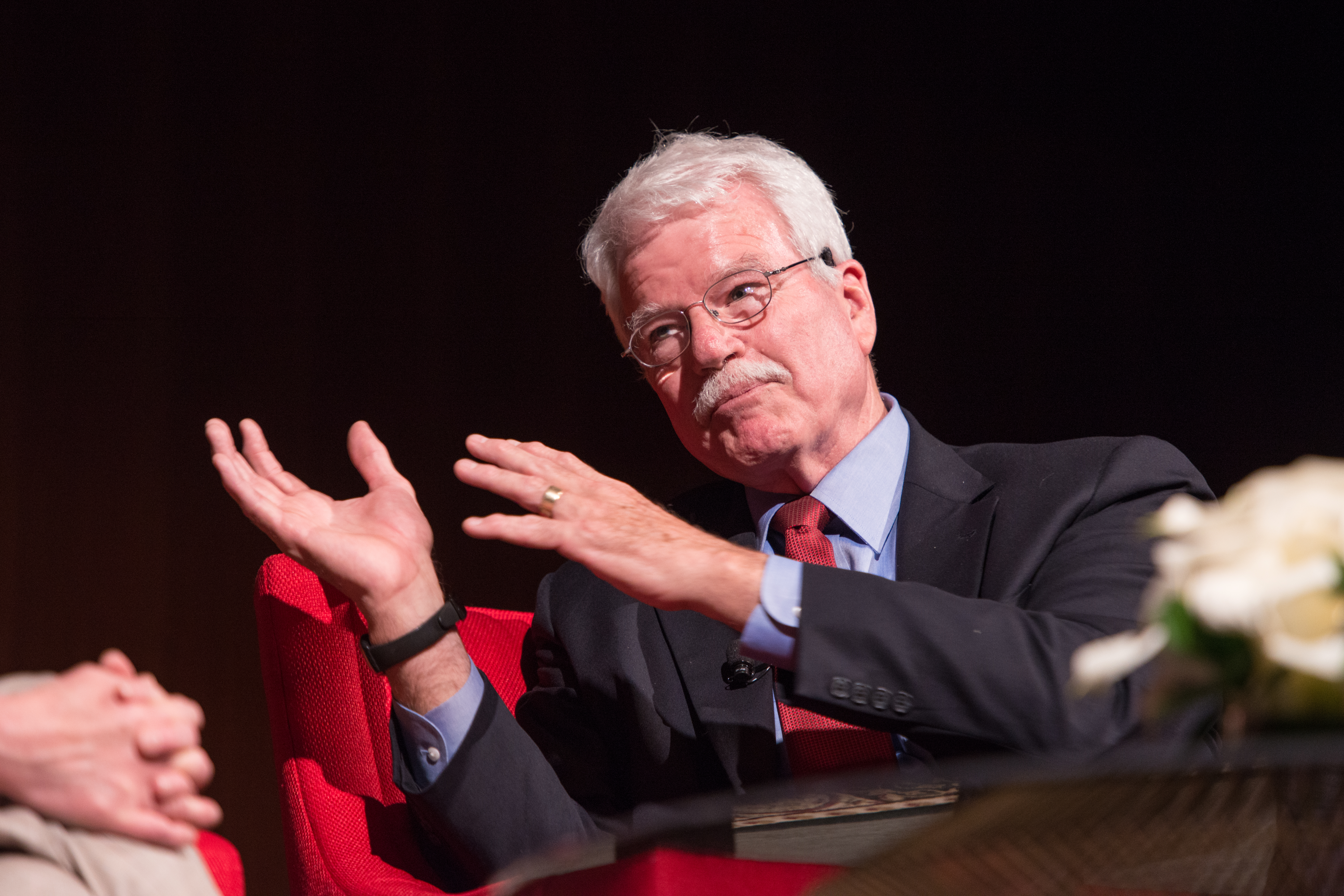
Miller at the LBJ Presidential Library in 2014

According to a 2013 article in the National Journal, Miller was one of seven members of the 113th Congress House of Representatives who tied for most liberal.

In 2011–12, Miller sponsored 10 bills (placing him at #40 out of 440 House members), none of which were made into law (ranks 18 of 440). He co-sponsored 199 bills (placing him at #138 out of 440), 4 of which were made into law (ranks 17 of 440).

During Miller's 1974 campaign, he routinely disclosed his donors and expenses, taking advantage of the Watergate scandal that was still in the minds of voters. This helped get him a seat in the House at the age of 29, becoming one of the Watergate Babies. At the time of his retirement, he was one of the last surviving members of the large Democratic freshman class of 1974, and had spent over half of his life in Congress. Miller has been described as someone who has "proven himself both a liberal lion ...and savvy about working both sides of the aisle.”

With his father being the former chairman of the state Senate Finance Committee and mentor Phillip Burton being an integral part of liberal politics in the 1970s, Miller has been described as the “heir to a tradition of Bay Area working-class politics.” Miller had one of the most liberal voting records in the House, and brings "a zest for political combat." A review of Miller's career states that, although he has been unsuccessful in his pursuit of top party positions, he has "learned a legislator’s virtues of patience, timing, and creativity."

Environmental issues

In the House, Miller was a member of the Natural Resources Committee; he was that Committee's chairman from 1991 to 1994. Miller supported efforts to preserve public lands such as the 1994 California Desert Protection Act, which among other things created Death Valley National Park and Joshua Tree National Park. In addition, Miller was the chief sponsor of the Central Valley Project Improvement Act of 1992, which mandated that the federal government's Bureau of Reclamation manage the Central Valley Project in order to better protect the fish and wildlife populations of California's Bay-Delta region. Miller lost his chairmanship when Republicans won control of Congress in 1994. He stayed as the committee's Ranking Member until 2000, and remained on the committee as a member until 2015. Miller was also a member of the Congressional Wildlife Refuge Caucus.

Labor issues

From 2001 to 2006, Miller was the ranking Democrat on the Education and the Workforce Committee. With that committee's chairman and their Senate counterparts, Miller helped draft the No Child Left Behind Act in 2001 and 2002. Miller has focused on pension issues, reinstating Davis-Bacon Act wage protections for Gulf Coast workers in the wake of Hurricane Katrina. In addition, Miller has worked on education issues such as protesting student aid cuts, increasing No Child Left Behind Act funding, and investigating the Bush administration's hiring of Armstrong Williams to promote that law. Miller has also been a vocal advocate of labor and immigration reform in the Commonwealth of the Northern Mariana Islands. In 2007, as chairman of the House Education and Labor Committee, Miller sponsored the Fair Minimum Wage Act of 2007, which was enacted into law as an amendment to another bill. In 2001, Miller said, "The secret ballot is absolutely necessary in order to ensure that workers are not intimidated into voting for a union they might not otherwise choose." He was an "outspoken critic of the apparel industry record on worker safety in foreign factories, most recently in Bangladesh."

Education

Miller's biggest defeat was when he lost 424-1 in congress for his amendment to House Resolution 6 of 1994. His refusal to make provision for homeschooling caused the national home school community to lobby the whole congress against Miller's amendment to the Improving America's Schools Act of 1994. Miller sponsored the Protecting Students from Sexual and Violent Predators Act, a bill that would require school districts receiving federal funds to give all employees criminal background checks. The bill passed the House of Representatives on October 22, 2013.

Port Chicago disaster

Miller has petitioned to clear the names of the sailors of the World War II Port Chicago disaster in which more than 200 black men were court-martialed and 50 convicted of mutiny for refusing to continue to load ammunition onto warships after a tremendous explosion killed hundreds. For the most part, Miller's efforts failed. By 1999, only three of the sailors convicted of mutiny were still alive. That year, at Miller's behest, President Bill Clinton pardoned Freddie Meeks, one of the 50 convicted mutineers. In addition, Miller wrote the legislation to designate the site of the event as a National Memorial.

Native American gaming

Miller was a supporter of Native American gaming. In 2000, as ranking member of the House Resource Committee, Miller inserted an amendment to the Omnibus Indian Advancement Act that took an existing cardroom into federal trust for the Lytton Band of Pomo Indians. The amendment made the land acquisition retroactive to 1987, stating that "[s]uch land shall be deemed to have been held in trust and part of the reservation of the Rancheria prior to October 17, 1988." This allowed the Lyttons to open a casino at the cardroom under the terms of the Indian Gaming Regulatory Act of 1988. Some members of Congress and the gambling industry called the amendment "underhanded," while other politicians have judged the process to be nothing out of the ordinary. When Donald Trump protested the issuance of gaming licenses to Native Americans, saying the recipients didn't look like Indians to him, Miller responded:

"Thank God that's not the test of whether or not people have rights in this country or not – whether or not they pass your 'look' test."

In 2024, Ana Cabrera of MSNBC remarked, "Congressman George Miller of California, who had confronted Trump in 1993...said that was the most irresponsible testimony he had heard in his 40 years in Congress."

2008 presidential election

Miller, a superdelegate in the Democratic Party's 2008 presidential primary, pledged his support to Barack Obama despite the fact that his district voted for Hillary Clinton. Miller cited Obama's grassroots fundraising campaign, first-place win in the Iowa caucus and strong showing in the New Hampshire primary, leadership style and opposition to the Iraq War as reasons for his endorsement. The endorsement was first reported in the Contra Costa Times on January 9, 2008.

Relationship with Nancy Pelosi

Miller has been considered Nancy Pelosi's most trusted confidant, with conservative columnist Robert Novak describing him as "her consigliere, always at her side." Pelosi receives advice from Miller as well as protection from potential adversaries in the Democratic Caucus. Miller describes her as the leader he has been waiting for 30 years and supported her when the Democrats lost the majority in 2010, saying that the Obama administration did not defend her or her accomplishments. Pelosi also named Miller chairman of the Democratic Policy Committee, where he had an influential role in preparing the "New Direction" for the 2006 election.

Their friendship has spanned "over 30 years and many plane trips to Washington from their neighboring California districts," with some colleagues saying that they have become so close that they finish each other's sentences. The New York Times reported that "In the concerns of some Democrats — and the I-told-you-so’s of some Republicans — Mr. Miller represents Mrs. Pelosi’s true liberal soul.”

SunPower controversy

It was reported that Miller and his son, George Miller IV, a lobbyist, were involved in the controversy surrounding the U.S. Department of Energy awarding a $1.2 billion loan to the struggling SunPower Corporation. The loan was awarded hours before the DOE program was set to expire. It was reported that by April 2012, the company's stock had fallen nearly 50% since the loan had been awarded. SunPower paid Miller's son and his lobbying firm US$138,000 to represent them. Miller asserted that he and his son never discuss legislation; his son, however, does boast openly of political connections in Washington.

Accepting free travel

In January 2012, Miller was cited as one of the members of Congress who had accepted the most free travel the previous year.

=== Committee assignments ===
- Committee on Education and Labor (ranking member)
  - As ranking member of the full committee, Miller may serve as an ex officio member of all subcommittees of which he is not already a voting member.
  - Subcommittee on Workforce Protections
  - Subcommittee on Health, Employment, Labor, and Pensions
- United States House Select Committee on Children, Youth, and Families (Chair)

=== Caucus memberships ===
- Congressional Progressive Caucus
- Congressional Wildlife Refuge Caucus
- International Conservation Caucus
- House Democratic Steering and Policy Committee (Co-Chair for Policy)

== Personal life ==
Miller owned a townhouse in Capitol Hill, Washington, D.C. for decades, renting rooms to fellow members of the U.S. House, even after some moved to the Senate. His longest-standing tenants were Senators Chuck Schumer and Dick Durbin. Miller purchased the residence in 1977 and sold it when he retired from the House at the end of 2014. Prior tenants included former Representatives Marty Russo, Leon Panetta and Sam Gejdenson.

== Popular culture ==
In the 2026 Judith Heumann biopic, Being Heumann, which covers the Section 504 sit-ins, he is portrayed by Rob Delaney.

== Electoral history ==
George Miller electoral history

United States House of Representatives elections, 1974
Party	Candidate	Votes	%
Democratic	George Miller	82,765	55.6
Republican	Mark C. Luce	66,115	44.4
Total votes		148,880	100
Turnout			
Democratic hold			

United States House of Representatives elections, 1976
Party	Candidate	Votes	%
Democratic	George Miller (incumbent)	147,064	74.7
Republican	Robert L. Vickers	45,863	23.3
American Independent	Melvin E. Stanley	3,889	2.0
Total votes		196,816	100
Turnout			
Democratic hold			

United States House of Representatives elections, 1978
Party	Candidate	Votes	%
Democratic	George Miller (incumbent)	109,676	63.5
Republican	Paula Gordon	58,332	33.7
American Independent	Melvin E. Stanley	4,857	2.8
Total votes		172,865	100
Turnout			
Democratic hold			

United States House of Representatives elections, 1980
Party	Candidate	Votes	%
Democratic	George Miller (incumbent)	142,044	63.3
Republican	Giles St. Clair	70,479	31.4
Libertarian	Steve Snow	6,923	3.1
American Independent	Thomas J. "Tommy" Thompson	5,023	2.2
Total votes		224,469	100
Turnout			
Democratic hold			

United States House of Representatives elections, 1982
Party	Candidate	Votes	%
Democratic	George Miller (incumbent)	126,952	67.2
Republican	Paul E. Vallely	56,960	30.2
Libertarian	Rich Newell	2,752	1.4
American Independent	Terry L. Wells	2,205	1.2
Total votes		188,509	100
Turnout			
Democratic hold			

United States House of Representatives elections, 1984
Party	Candidate	Votes	%
Democratic	George Miller (incumbent)	158,306	66.7
Republican	Rosemary Thakar	78,985	33.3
Total votes		237,291	100
Turnout			
Democratic hold			

United States House of Representatives elections, 1986
Party	Candidate	Votes	%
Democratic	George Miller (incumbent)	124,174	66.6
Republican	Rosemary Thakar	62,379	33.4
Total votes		186,553	100
Turnout			
Democratic hold			

United States House of Representatives elections, 1988
Party	Candidate	Votes	%
Democratic	George Miller (incumbent)	170,006	68.4
Republican	Jean Last	78,478	31.6
Total votes		248,484	100
Turnout			
Democratic hold			

United States House of Representatives elections, 1990
Party	Candidate	Votes	%
Democratic	George Miller (incumbent)	121,080	60.5
Republican	Roger A. Payton	79,031	39.5
Total votes		200,111	100
Turnout			
Democratic hold			

United States House of Representatives elections, 1992
Party	Candidate	Votes	%
Democratic	George Miller (incumbent)	153,320	70.3
Republican	Dave Scholl	54,822	25.1
Peace and Freedom	David L. Franklin	9,840	4.6
Total votes		217,982	100
Turnout			
Democratic hold			

United States House of Representatives elections, 1994
Party	Candidate	Votes	%
Democratic	George Miller (incumbent)	116,105	69.7
Republican	Charles V. Hughes	45,698	27.4
Peace and Freedom	William A. "Bill" Callison	4,798	2.9
Total votes		166,601	100
Turnout			
Democratic hold			

United States House of Representatives elections, 1996
Party	Candidate	Votes	%
Democratic	George Miller (incumbent)	137,089	71.9
Republican	Norman H. Reece	42,542	22.3
Reform	William C. Thompson	6,866	3.6
Natural Law	Bob Liatunick	4,420	2.3
Total votes		190,917	100
Turnout			
Democratic hold			

United States House of Representatives elections, 1998
Party	Candidate	Votes	%
Democratic	George Miller (incumbent)	125,842	76.7
Republican	Norman H. Reece	38,290	23.3
Total votes		164,132	100
Turnout			
Democratic hold			

United States House of Representatives elections, 2000
Party	Candidate	Votes	%
Democratic	George Miller (incumbent)	159,692	76.5
Republican	Christopher A. Hoffman	44,154	21.2
Natural Law	Martin Sproul	4,943	2.3
Total votes		208,789	100
Turnout			
Democratic hold			

United States House of Representatives elections, 2002
Party	Candidate	Votes	%
Democratic	George Miller (incumbent)	97,849	70.8
Republican	Charles R. Hargrave	36,584	21.2
Libertarian	Scott A. Wilson	3,943	2.8
Total votes		138,376	100
Turnout			
Democratic hold			

United States House of Representatives elections, 2004
Party	Candidate	Votes	%
Democratic	George Miller (incumbent)	166,831	76.1
Republican	Charles R. Hargrave	52,446	23.9
Total votes		219,277	100
Turnout			
Democratic hold			

United States House of Representatives elections, 2006
Party	Candidate	Votes	%
Democratic	George Miller (incumbent)	118,000	84.0
Libertarian	Camden McConnell	22,486	16.0
Total votes		140,486	100
Turnout			
Democratic hold			

United States House of Representatives elections, 2008
Party	Candidate	Votes	%
Democratic	George Miller (incumbent)	170,962	72.9
Republican	Roger Allen Petersen	51,166	21.8
Peace and Freedom	Bill Callison	6,695	2.8
Libertarian	Camden McConnell	5,950	2.5
Total votes		234,773	100
Turnout			
Democratic hold			

United States House of Representatives elections, 2010
Party	Candidate	Votes	%
Democratic	George Miller (incumbent)	90,504	67.4
Republican	Rick Tubbs	43,792	32.6
Total votes		134,296	100
Turnout			
Democratic hold			

United States House of Representatives elections, 2012
Party	Candidate	Votes	%
Democratic	George Miller (incumbent)	200,743	69.7
Republican	Virginia Fuller	87,136	30.3
Total votes		287,879	100
Turnout			
Democratic hold			

U.S. House of Representatives
Preceded by Ron Dellums	Member of the U.S. House of Representatives from California's 7th congressional district 1975–2013	Succeeded by Ami Bera
New office	Chair of the House Children Committee; 1983–1991	Succeeded by Pat Schroeder
Preceded by Mo Udall	Chair of the House Natural Resources Committee; 1991–1995	Succeeded by Don Young
Preceded by Don Young	Ranking Member of the House Natural Resources Committee; 1995–2001	Succeeded by Nick Rahall
Preceded by Bill Clay	Ranking Member of the House Education Committee; 2001–2007	Succeeded by Buck McKeon
Preceded by Buck McKeon	Chair of the House Education Committee; 2007–2011	Succeeded by John Kline
Preceded by John Kline	Ranking Member of the House Education Committee; 2011–2015	Succeeded by Bobby Scott
Preceded by Jerry McNerney	Member of the U.S. House of Representatives from California's 11th congressional district 2013–2015	Succeeded by Mark DeSaulnier
Party political offices
Preceded by Robert Byrd, Alan Cranston, Al Gore, Gary Hart, Bennett Johnston, Ted Kennedy, Tip O'Neill, Don Riegle, Paul Sarbanes, Jim Sasser	Response to the State of the Union address 1983; Served alongside: Les AuCoin, Joe Biden, Bill Bradley, Robert Byrd, Tom Daschle, Bill Hefner, Barbara B. Kennelly, Tip O'Neill, Paul Simon, Paul Tsongas, Tim Wirth	Succeeded by Max Baucus, Joe Biden, David L. Boren, Barbara Boxer, Robert Byrd, Dante Fascell, Bill Gray, Tom Harkin, Dee Huddleston, Carl Levin, Tip O'Neill, Claiborne Pell
New office	Chair of the House Democratic Policy Committee; 2003–2013	Succeeded by Rob Andrews
Preceded by Rob Andrews	Chair of the House Democratic Policy Committee; 2014–2015	Succeeded by Donna Edwards
U.S. order of precedence (ceremonial)
Preceded by Dave Obey as Former U.S. Representative	Order of precedence of the United States as Former U.S. Representative	Succeeded by Henry Waxman as Former U.S. Representative
