= Crown Heights Tenant Union =

Tenant union in Brooklyn, New York

- Predecessor: Crown Heights Assembly
- Formation: October 2013; 12 years ago
- Purpose: Tenant organizing
- Location: Crown Heights, Brooklyn, New York City
- Website: crownheightstenantunion.org

The Crown Heights Tenant Union (CHTU) is a tenants union created in October 2013 to unify old and new tenants against the gentrification of the neighborhood of Crown Heights, Brooklyn, New York City. The CHTU has pushed for local collective bargaining agreements between tenants and landlords to be written into the deeds of buildings that would regulate rent increases and codify repair and renovation standards. They also assist individual tenants, educating them on their rights and how to enforce them, lobby in Albany for better rent laws, and participate in direct action, targeting predatory equity real-estate companies they believe to be involved in illegal evictions and harassment tactics.

== Founding ==
The CHTU was founded in October 2013 by approximately 12 residents and community organizers, including activists who'd been part of Occupy Wall Street (OWS), longtime Black and working class Brooklyn tenants, and labour and tenant organizers. Joel Feingold, then a graduate student who had lived in the area for four years and been involved in OWS, started the CHTU with the goal of uniting newer and older tenants. By April 2016, the CHTU had 60–70 buildings with tenant associations connected to them, and formed at least 6 local chapters. Over 700 residents have attended meetings and demonstrations, with the core membership consisting of about 50 attendees. In the early planning stages of the CHTU, the Urban Homesteading Assistance Board played a large role in organizing new and existing tenant associations and amalgamating them with the CHTU.

=== Goals, strategy, and structure ===
CHTU organizers would like to see neighborhood-wide collective bargaining agreements between property owners and residents written into the deeds of rented buildings. Such agreements would include codified standards on repairs, fair prices on buyouts, and protections against unfair rent increases and evictions. Organizers with CHTU have said that the Crown Heights neighborhood has been disproportionately affected by "predatory equity", a term for when corporations acquire buildings with many rent-regulated units with a plan to convert them to market-rate rentals, as well as multinational and Wall Street-backed landlords.

The CHTU targets landlords through direct action, picketing their offices, homes, and banks. They also organize marches to rally tenants and march on store-fronts landlords rent out to high-end bars and boutiques. They provide tenants with assistance, accompanying them to housing court, and educating them about their rights and methods to enforce them. They consider landlords to use divide-and-conquer strategies which pit old against new tenants and Black and non-Black tenants against each other; The CHTU considers all tenants as having shared interests that can only be achieved together.

The CHTU is organized into three levels. The first is the autonomous tenant associations of each building, the second is the CHTU locals, which organize tenant associations with the same landlord, and the third is the General Membership Meeting, where new proposals for action and strategic questions are proposed. The Organizing Committee intersects all three, wherein locals and tenant associations democratically set the agenda for the General Membership Meeting. The CHTU holds monthly meetings to discuss and vote on proposals; the meetings also educate tenants on legal and practical issues such as finding units' rent history, how to organize tenants, and how to report landlords for overdue repairs.

== Activities ==
=== Tenant associations ===
In February 2014, the CHTU held a rally outside of 1059 Union Street, purchased in June 2013 by the private-equity real estate company BCB Property Management, which had purchased 13 other properties within the neighborhood within the last two years according to an analysis by the Urban Homesteading Assistance Board. After the purchase, BCB began to renovate vacant apartments and offer the tenants buy-outs. Tenants had contacted the Crown Heights Assembly, formed a tenant association, and filed numerous complaints to 311 that caused the New York City Department of Housing Preservation and Development (HPD) to include it under its Alternative Enforcement Program, a list of the city's 200 "most distressed" residential properties. Local tenants took notice and formed their own organizations, eventually merging into the CHTU.

In January 2016, residents of 80 New York Ave. formed a tenant association with the help of the CHTU and MFY legal services after being left without heat. The tenants rallied outside the Brooklyn Supreme Court and in front of their building and hung signs in the street-facing windows that spelled out "SLUMLORD: DON'T RENT HERE". Two years later, tenants at 174 Clinton Avenue organized a rent strike with the CHTU in response to being left without heat or hot water for a month, which also resulted in widespread damage due to burst pipes. The tenants filed almost 50 complaints, leading Department of Buildings inspectors to issue a violation to the landlord.

In 2019, residents of 1151-1155 Dean Street formed the Dean Street Tenant Union and filed two suits against their landlord, Renaissance Realty, alleging they had illegally inflated rent in renovated units and ignored dangerous conditions in unrenovated ones. They sued Renaissance for overdue repairs, rallied outside their buildings, and picketed the landlord's home. Feingold had served as an advisor for the tenants. In August 2020, the CHTU helped rally an eviction defense at 1214 Dean Street which gathered approximately 100 people after being notified of forced entry by a landlord by Equality for Flatbush. Tenants stated that they had been subjected to months of threats and harassment by the landlords.

In December 2021, members of the CHTU attended a rally outside 283 Albany Avenue organized by the tenants against their landlord, Shamco Management Corp. The tenants had filed a complaint against Shamco to the New York City Housing Authority for ignoring months of tenant requests to install a ramp. The tenants accused the landlord of delaying the repairs, with elderly residents having written explaining their conditions and referencing the Americans with Disabilities Act.

The CHTU supported the Robinson-Torrain family against what they claimed was an illegal forced eviction by Mandy Management from the home they had owned from 1951 to 2015 at 964 Park Place. The CHTU, Brooklyn Eviction Defense - Tenant Union, and local tenants kept a 24-hour eviction watch for 18 days outside the home until a court order on February 28, 2022, restored the Robinson-Torrain family's ownership as they continued the deed theft case. Attorney Adam M. Birnbaum signed a letter supporting the case, describing it as a "foreclosure rescue scam". The CHTU and Robinson-Torrains maintain that the signature on the deed, which was not notarized, was forged.

In March 2022, the CHTU represented tenants at 567 St. John's Place, asking supporters to call HPD and demand that ownership be removed from the landlord. The landlord had neglected to attend to pest infestations, collapsed ceilings, and lead paint. In June 2021, the tenants had filed a complaint to the Brooklyn Housing Court asking for the landlord to be removed, due to being a "slumlord" who had allowed 400 violations to accrue. In April 2022, an HPD representative told the Gothamist that they supported the complaint. In June, the housing court ruled in the tenants' favor and ordered the landlord be removed from ownership of the building by July 14.

In May, CHTU organized in tandem for members Janina Davis and Joyce Webster, who had been subjected to criminal court proceedings and arrests by their landlords and the NYPD's 77th Precinct in attempts to evict them. The CHTU said the situation matched a pattern of police and prosecutors aiding the abuse of tenants, particularly Black women, and held multiple rallies, phone banks, and speak-outs to draw public attention to the case. The CHTU stated they would escalate political action if the charges against the two members were not dismissed and if the landlords did not agree to restitution.

In November, the 900s Park Place Block Association, aided by the CHTU and Crown Heights CARE Collective, began organizing regular community meetings on their immediate block. Dozens of them organized to defend a neighbor against eviction from 972 Park Place, which had hundreds of active violations including multiple leaks, mold intrusion, faulty wiring, and structural flaws. The tenant threatened with eviction had suffered escalating harassment after refusing a buy-out, including repair refusals, breaking and entering, threats, destroying locks and doors, leaving garbage and sewage on his stoop, and verbal and physical harassment of teachers at the daycare across from the street.

=== Rent legislation and electoral politics ===
In 2015, the CHTU was involved in protesting NYC's rent laws at the state capitol (which controls the city's rent laws). CHTU members held a rally outside the governor's office demanding a repeal of pro-landlord rent laws that were passed sinced the 1990s. That same year, the CHTU convinced Diana Richardson to run for the New York State Assembly; she ran on a platform of expanding tenants' rights and rejecting real-estate money. Richarson won overwhelmingly on the Working Families Party line. Cea Weaver, a tenant advocate who helped found the CHTU, helped craft the pledge to reject real-estate money and convinced Richardson to sign. In 2020, Phara Souffrant Forrest was elected to New York's 57th State Assembly district; she had joined the CHTU in 2017 to organize the tenants in her building. Her campaign was supported by the Democratic Socialists of America and she ran on a platform of tenant rights, education, immigration rights, climate change, and health care.

From December 2021 to January 2022, the CHTU and other organizations—including Brooklyn Eviction Defense, Flatbush Tenant Coalition, the NYC Democratic Socialists of America, and Housing Justice for All—organized marches to push for the eviction moratorium to be extended from January 15 to May 31, 2022. They also called for a permanent end to winter evictions and the passage of the "Good Cause" Bill, which would prevent landlords from removing tenants without a court order, cap rent increases at 3%, and permit tenants to challenge unfair increases. One march began at the Manhattan Housing Court, stopped at the State Assembly office, and ended at Trinity Church, where the organizers asked the clergy to sign a letter supporting the reforms. Another march started at the Brooklyn Housing Court and went to the Manhattan Housing Court, stopping along the way to protest law firm Slochowsky and Slochowsky for representing landlords known for their high number of eviction cases. An organizer with the CHTU said the CHTU believed the Good Clause eviction protection is important but doesn't go far enough as approximately 200,000 people, including tenants in 5 buildings represented by the CHTU, would be unprotected due to missing rent payments.

=== Protests against building developments ===
In 2015, the city announced plans to sell the Bedford Union Armory to the Slate Property Group and BFC Partners to develop a recreation center and 13-story building comprising 300 rental apartments and 24 condominiums, of which 67 would be marked as "affordable". In 2016, the CHTU and housing activist group New York Communities for Change (NYCC) protested the planned development. They criticized the lack of "actually affordable" housing planned in addition to a scandal where Slate colluded to covertly convert Manhattan's Rivington House hospice for people with AIDS into luxury condos, despite a deed restriction from the city barring the site's redevelopment for housing. The incident caused the city to investigate Slate and Mayor De Blasio to reconsider Slate's involvement in the Bedford-Union Armory sale. Slate left the project two weeks after the protest.

In November 2017, a day before the City Council was set to finalize the project, Crown heights residents including NYCC, the CHTU, and the Legal Aid Society announced a lawsuit against the city to stall the development. They argued City Hall excluded rent-regulated tenants from their review and therefore failed to make an accurate assessment of projected displacement. Attorneys stated they hoped the lawsuit would force the council to change its evaluation procedures and that the standard Environmental Quality Review Manual violated city law by not being presented to the public for comment. The Legal Aid Society's restraining order to delay the hearing had been denied by the Brooklyn Supreme court the day before. The CHTU collaborated with the Democratic Socialists of America to protest the planned development.

In February 2018, Crown Heights residents voiced their displeasure about the redevelopment of the old spice factory, originally Consumer's Park Brewery, located at 960 Franklin Avenue. The developer, Continuum, sought a rezoning of the site to create six towers between 15 and 37 stories high. Local activist Alicia Boyd stated "we are now considering the idea that we can negotiate to have a 40-story building impede on the garden when the whole reason it was downzoned was to protect it". Esteban Giron, a member of the CHTU and part of Community Board 9's land use committee called the proposal "the equivalent of neighborhood rezoning", saying "this is major".

In September 2020, the Seventh-day Adventist Church on Park Place planned to partner with Hope Street Capital to develop a 180-unit building on the grounds surrounding the church; the Church said they needed the money for repairs and to fund a bilingual school program they ran. The development would require approval by the Landmarks Preservation Commission. Locals opposed due to concerns the structure would be out of place in the landmarked historic residential area, would remove green space, and would obstruct views. The neighborhood group Friends of 920 Park started a petition that reached over 5,000 signatures opposing the development. The CHTU and Crown Heights North Association also released statements against the project. In their statement, the CHTU said "Turning over any part of this property to become luxury studios and one-bedrooms – unsuitable for and far beyond the reach of the families that built this neighborhood – would undoubtedly further gentrify our community through secondary displacement."

In April 2021, local tenants and organizations including the CHTU and Save Associated repeatedly rallied outside the home of Midwood Investment and Development's CEO to protest a 30-day eviction notice he had sent the Associated Supermarket at 975 Ave. Michael Hollingsworth, a city council candidate and CHTU member since 2016, stated that the closure would create a food desert in the area. A representative from Midwood said the owner of the supermarket had known of the planned re-development for at least 5 years and refused offers to help relocate, so protestors should direct attention there.

=== Protests of bars and restaurants ===
In Summer 2015, the CHTU protested the development of the Union Street Pub when they applied for a liquor license, having replaced a former hair braiding shop. CHTU described the development as part of a pattern of landlords pushing out "successful, long-standing small businesses" in favor of higher-end operations.

In February 2016, they protested the development of the "Crow Bar" during a liquor license hearing, leading to a split vote by the board. A representative of the CHTU stated three bars with liquor licenses were already operating in a 500-foot radius, violating a rule by the State Liquor Authority, and criticized the bar's name. Crown Heights had previously been called "Crow Hill", in reference to the derogatory term for the Black residents living there. By 2017, they had successfully lobbied the bar to change its name to "Franklin 820".

In 2017, Crown Heights residents protested the Summerhill restaurant, accusing the owner of fetishizing the area's violent history by bragging about the bar's "bullet hole-ridden" decor, which an investigative report by the Gothamist concluded was most likely cosmetic damage from construction. Local residents called on the owner to patch up the wall, engage with the community by meeting with the CHTU, and submit a detailed plan to hire Crown Heights residents and people of color at living wages or higher.

=== Artistic protest ===
In 2016, the CHTU collaborated with the Illuminator Art Collective to identify four buildings where landlords had allegedly intimidated tenants and deregulated rent-stabilized apartments. The collective beamed messages onto the sides of the building such as "Equal repairs for all" and "Let's fight the power that be". The collective later displayed a video of tenants composing the messages for an exhibition titled "Agitprop!" at the Brooklyn Museum, which showed how artists have used their work for political change.

In December 2017, residents at 1030 Carroll Street, public advocate Letitia James, Assemblyman Walter Mosley and the CHTU protested the building's landlord due to inadequate heating and shoddy repairs. The landlord had purchased the building three years prior and begun offering buyouts, with tenants saying heating and repair issues had been common since then. James listed the landlord as one of the city's 100 worst in 2015. The CHTU cast a large projection onto the building that demanded "Heat For The Holidays". As of 2020, the CHTU listed the landlord on their "Worst Landlord Watch List".

=== Other ===
In March 2019, attorneys and support staff staged a 24-hour strike of CAMBA Legal Services, which represents low-income clients in Brooklyn and Staten Island, due to delayed contract negotiations. The workers had recently unionized under the Association of Legal Aid Attorneys as UAW Local 2325 and asked for better benefits and salaries. Approximately 40 employees as well as the CHTU and its supporters picketed outside several Brooklyn CAMBA offices. The striking workers said they chose 24 hours to both hold CAMBA accountable and minimize the impact on their clients.
