= Phara Souffrant Forrest =

American politician, activist, and nurse

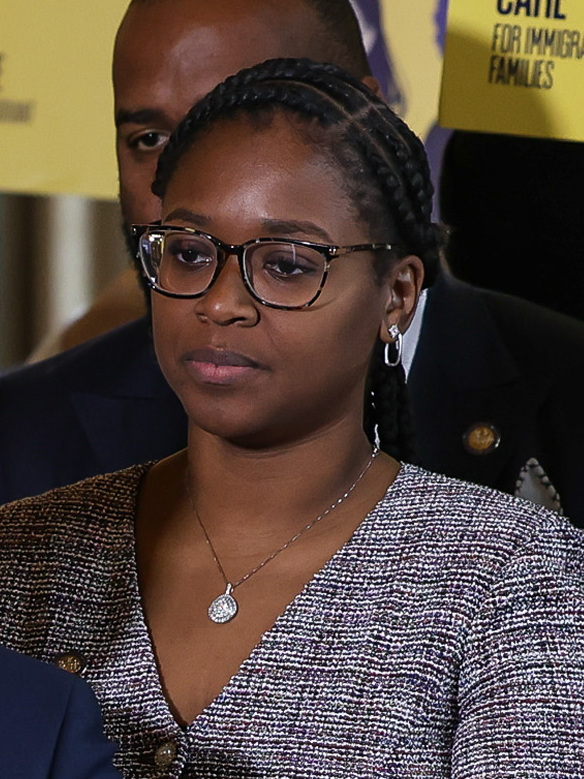
- Forrest in 2025

Member of the New York State Assembly from the 57th district
- Incumbent
- Assumed office January 1, 2021
- Preceded by: Walter T. Mosley

Personal details
- Born: February 5, 1989 (age 37) Brooklyn, New York, U.S.
- Party: Democratic
- Other political affiliations: Democratic Socialists of America
- Education: State University of New York, Geneseo (BA); New York City College of Technology (AS); CUNY Graduate Center (BS)
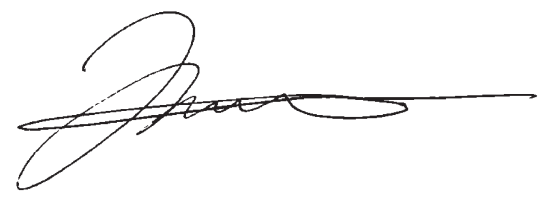
- Signature
- Website: State Assembly website

Phara Souffrant Forrest (born February 5, 1989) is an American politician, nurse, and tenant activist. A member of the New York City chapter of Democratic Socialists of America, she is the assembly member for the 57th district of the New York State Assembly. After defeating incumbent Assembly Member Walter T. Mosley in the Democratic primary in June 2020, Forrest won the general election in November of that year. She defeated former District Manager of Community Board 2 Olanike Alabi in the primary to defend her seat in 2022. She was unopposed in the general election.

== Early life and education ==
Forrest was born in Crown Heights, Brooklyn to immigrants from Haiti. She graduated from the Benjamin Banneker Academy and from State University of New York at Geneseo with a B.A. in International Relations. She then obtained an associate nursing degree from New York City College of Technology and a Bachelor of Science in Nursing from the CUNY School of Professional Studies. Forrest worked as an ICU nurse and was active in the New York State Nurses Association union.

== Political career ==
In 2017, Forrest joined the Crown Heights Tenant Union as part of her efforts to fight the gentrification and displacement of her rent-stabilized apartment building. In June 2019, she worked with the Housing Justice for All campaign to fortify tenant protective rights.

In August 2019, Forrest launched a campaign against incumbent Democrat Walter T. Mosley in the primary for the heavily Democratic 57th State Assembly district. Souffrant's campaign emphasized support for decarceration, investment in public housing, and state-wide single-payer healthcare. During her campaign, she was endorsed by the Democratic Socialists of America and Representative Alexandria Ocasio-Cortez. Her campaign was funded entirely by the community, with no outside funding from corporations or businesses.

Forrest trailed Mosley by 588 votes on election night June 23, 2020, but absentee ballots were more significant than usual due to the COVID-19 pandemic. Once absentee ballots were counted on July 22, 2020, Forrest led Mosley by over 2,500 votes and was declared the winner. While Mosley remained on the general election ballot under the Working Families Party line, Forrest won the November race with about 74% of the vote over Mosley's 26%. She is a member of the New York State Socialists in Office.

In 2022, Forrest was challenged by former District Leader and Community Board District Manager Olanike "Ola" Alabi in the Democratic primary. Alabi was supported by the Kings County Democratic Party and Congressman Hakeem Jeffries, among others. Forrest won with 67.24% of the vote while Alabi received 32.43% of the vote. Forrest was uncontested in the general election.

In November 2025, Forrest introduced the Fair Share Act, which would raise tax rates by 2% on households with incomes over $1 million.
