= Hasan Kwame Jeffries =

American writer and professor (born 1973)

Hasan Jeffries
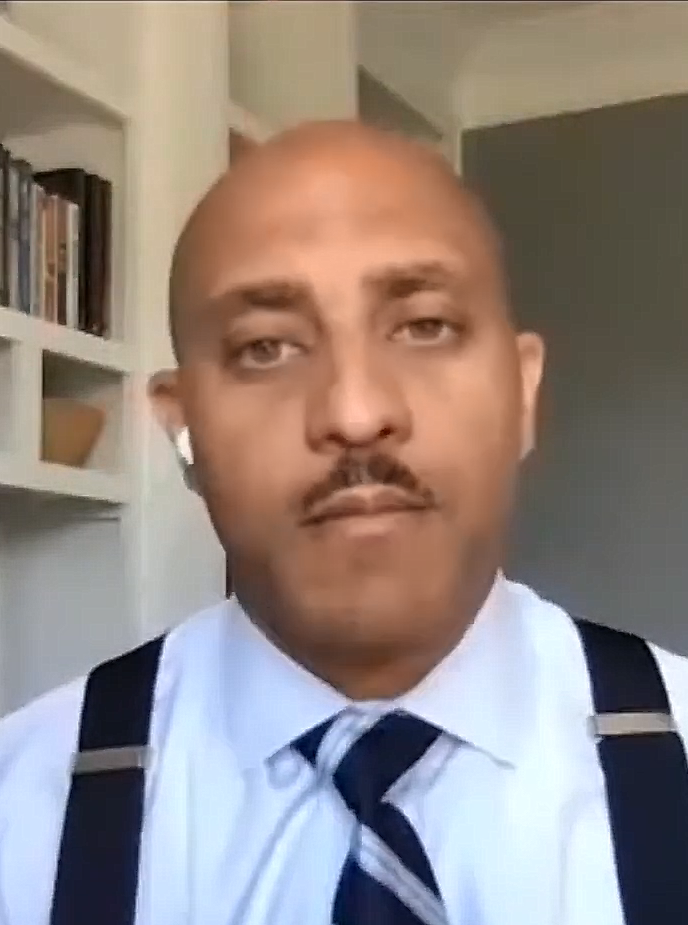
- Jeffries in 2021
- Born: January 13, 1973 (age 53); New York City, New York, U.S.
- Relatives: Hakeem Jeffries (brother); Leonard Jeffries (uncle)

Academic background
- Education: Morehouse College (BA); Duke University (MA, PhD)
- Thesis: Freedom Politics: Transcending Civil Rights in Lowndes County, Alabama, 1965–2000 (2002)

Academic work
- Discipline: American history
- Sub-discipline: African-American history
- Institutions: University of Alabama; Ohio State University

Hasan Kwame Jeffries (born January 13, 1973) is a history professor and author at Ohio State University. He is the younger brother of U.S. House minority leader Hakeem Jeffries. He is the nephew of Leonard Jeffries, a former political science professor at City College of New York.

== Early life and education ==
Jeffries was born in the borough of Brooklyn in New York City and graduated summa cum laude from Morehouse College with a B.A. degree in history in 1994. He became a member of the Pi chapter of Kappa Alpha Psi fraternity. He received a Ph.D. in American history with a specialization in African American history from Duke University in 2002.

== Career ==
He taught for a year at the University of Alabama in Tuscaloosa before joining Ohio State's faculty in 2003. His profile page also states he was the lead historian and primary scriptwriter for the $27 million renovation of the National Civil Rights Museum at the Lorraine Hotel in Memphis, Tennessee, from 2010 to 2014 and worked on the PBS documentary Black America Since MLK. He hosts a podcast called "Teaching Hard History" for the Southern Poverty Law Center's educational division, Teaching Tolerance.

He was interviewed by NPR about how history is taught in American schools. He has appeared on C-SPAN several times, including as an author and discussing current events and history. In 2010, he lectured at Swarthmore College on the Student Nonviolent Coordinating Committee (SNCC).

He wrote a book about the struggle for civil rights in Lowndes County, Alabama.

== Written work ==
- Bloody Lowndes : civil rights and Black power in Alabama's Black Belt. New York: New York University Press. 2009. ISBN 978-0-8147-4305-8. OCLC 276816664.
- (Editor) Understanding and teaching the civil rights movement. Madison, Wisconsin: The University of Wisconsin Press. 2019. ISBN 978-0-299-32190-1. OCLC 1089883602. A collection of essays by civil rights scholars and teachers.
