= Harvey L. Strelzin =

American politician

Member of the New York State Assembly from the 57th district
- In office January 1, 1969 – December 31, 1980
- Preceded by: Harold W. Cohn
- Succeeded by: Roger L. Green

Personal details
- Born: July 19, 1906 Brooklyn, New York City, New York
- Died: December 8, 1993 (aged 87)
- Party: Democratic

Harvey L. Strelzin (July 19, 1906 – December 8, 1993) was an American politician who served in the New York State Assembly from the 57th district from 1969 to 1980. He was Jewish.
