= Harold W. Cohn =

American politician (1913–1974)

Member of the New York State Assembly from the 57th district
- In office January 1, 1967 – December 31, 1968
- Preceded by: Louis Kalish
- Succeeded by: Harvey L. Strelzin

Member of the New York State Assembly from the 49th district
- In office January 1, 1966 – December 31, 1966
- Preceded by: District created
- Succeeded by: Dominick L. DiCarlo

Member of the New York State Assembly from Kings's 4th district
- In office 1959 – December 31, 1965
- Preceded by: Bernard Austin
- Succeeded by: District abolished

Personal details
- Born: September 25, 1913 Brooklyn, New York, U.S.
- Died: March 14, 1974 (aged 60) Brooklyn, New York, U.S.
- Party: Democratic

Harold W. Cohn (September 25, 1913 – March 14, 1974) was an American politician who served in the New York State Assembly from 1959 to 1968.

He died of cancer on March 14, 1974, in Brooklyn, New York City, New York at age 60. He was Jewish.
