= Leonard Jeffries =

American political scientist and academic (born 1937)

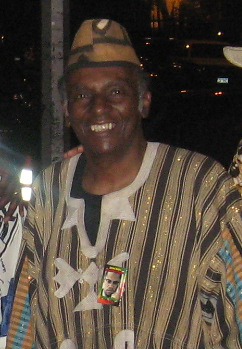
- Jeffries in 2010
- Born: January 19, 1937 (age 89); Newark, New Jersey, U.S.
- Occupations: Political scientist and academic
- Spouse: Rosalind Jeffries
- Relatives: Hakeem Jeffries (nephew); Hasan Kwame Jeffries (nephew)

Academic background
- Education: Lafayette College (BA); Columbia University (MA, PhD)
- Thesis: Sub-National Politics in the Ivory Coast Republic (1972)

Academic work
- Institutions: City College of New York; San Jose State University

Leonard Jeffries Jr. (born January 19, 1937) is an American political scientist and former academic. He was the departmental chair of Black studies at the City College of New York, part of the City University of New York (CUNY). He was born and raised in Newark, New Jersey. He is the uncle of U.S. House Minority Leader Hakeem Jeffries and Ohio State University historian Hasan Kwame Jeffries.

Known for his Pan-African Afrocentrist views that the role of African people in history and the accomplishments of African Americans are far more important than commonly held, Jeffries has urged that public school syllabi be made less "Eurocentric". He is a founding director and a former vice president and president of the Association for the Study of Classical African Civilizations (ASCAC).

Jeffries's claims that Jewish businessmen financed the Atlantic slave trade and used the movie industry to hurt black people, and that whites are "ice people" while blacks are "sun people", received national publicity in the early 1990s. Jeffries was discharged from his position as chair of CUNY's Black Studies Department, leading to a long legal battle that ended with the courts affirming the college's right to remove him from the position due to his incendiary remarks.

== Academic career ==
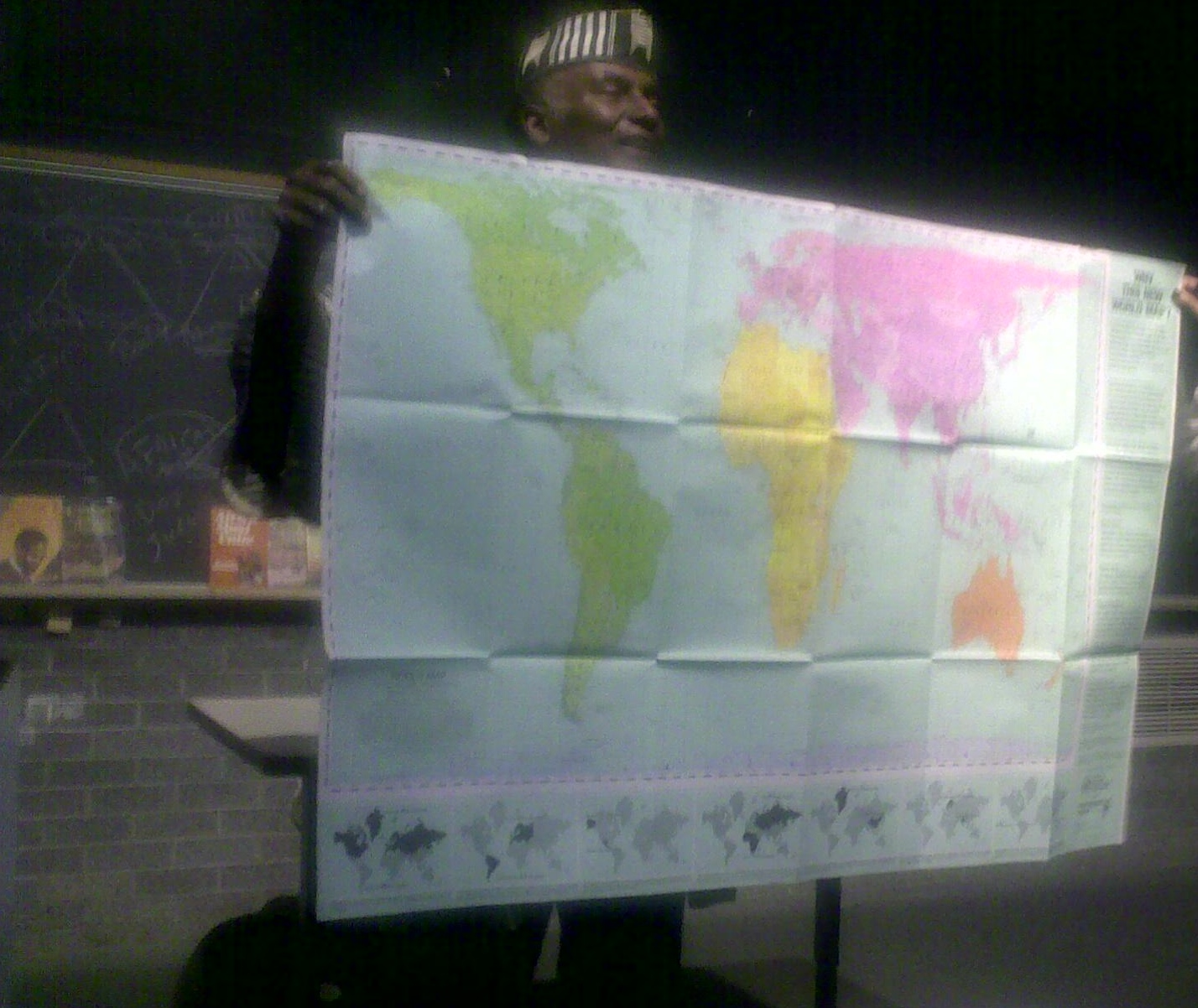
Jeffries holding up a Gall–Peters projection map

Jeffries attended Lafayette College for his undergraduate work; he was one of just four Black students on the campus when he arrived in 1955. At Lafayette, he pledged, and was accepted into, the only fraternity on campus at the time which accepted Black students – the predominantly-Jewish fraternity Pi Lambda Phi. He was an active participant in the fraternity's affairs and had a positive experience with the group; in his senior year, Jeffries was elected president of the fraternity. After graduating with honors in 1959, he won a Rotary International fellowship to the University of Lausanne in Switzerland. In 1961, he began study at Columbia University's School of International Affairs, from which he received a master's degree in 1965.

At the same time, Jeffries worked for Operation Crossroads Africa, allowing him to spend time in Guinea, Mali, Senegal, and the Ivory Coast. He became the program coordinator for West Africa in 1965. Jeffries became a political science instructor at City College of New York (CCNY) in 1969 and received his doctorate from Columbia University in 1971 with a dissertation on politics in the Ivory Coast. He became the founding chairman of Black Studies at San Jose State College in California. A year later, he became a tenured professor at CCNY and chair of its new Black Studies Department.

Jeffries became popular among students and as a speaker at college campuses and public organizations. He is known for his Pan-African Afrocentrist views—that the role of African people in history and the accomplishments of African Americans are far more important than commonly held by White historians.

Jeffries is also a proponent of the scientifically racist, pseudoscientific melanin theory, which posits that greater skin pigmentation makes Black people inherently superior to white people. He says melanin allows Black people to "negotiate the vibrations of the universe and to deal with the ultraviolet rays of the sun". One of his theories, based on the writings of Cheikh Anta Diop, is the idea that whites are "ice people" who are cold, territorial, and aggressive, while Blacks are "sun people" who are warm, compassionate, and peaceful.

== Removal as chairman and legal battles (1990s) ==
During a 1991 speech at the Empire State Black Arts and Cultural Festival in Albany, New York, Jeffries asserted that Russian Jews and the American Mafia were behind a conspiracy of Hollywood film producers to denigrate Black people, and that Jews had also controlled the Atlantic slave trade. His remarks were broadcast on cable television, drawing angry responses from Italian and Jewish Americans.

In 1992, Jeffries first got his term shortened from three years to one, and then was removed as chair of the department of African-American studies, but allowed to stay as a professor. He sued the school, and in August 1993 a federal jury found that his First Amendment rights had been violated. But Jeffries had been unanimously reappointed as chair. He was awarded $400,000 in damages (later reduced to $360,000).

The school appealed, but the federal appeals court upheld the verdict while removing the damages. The CUNY Institute for Research on the Diaspora in the Americas and Caribbean was created to do black research independent of Jeffries's department. It was headed by Edmund Gordon, who had led the Black Studies Department before Jeffries was reinstated.

In November 1994, the U.S. Supreme Court told the appeals court to reconsider after the related Supreme Court decision in Waters v. Churchill. The appeals court reversed its decision in April 1995.

=== Academic freedom debate ===
Jeffries's case led to debate about tenure, academic freedom and free speech. He was sometimes compared to Michael Levin, a CUNY professor who outside the classroom claimed that black people are inferior, and had recently won against the school in court.

One interpretation of Jeffries's case is that while a university cannot fire a professor for opinions and speech, it has more flexibility with a position like department chair. Another is that it allows public institutions to discipline employees in general for disruptive speech.

== Works ==
His State of New York consultancy allowed him to produce the document A Curriculum of Inclusion, calling for changing school curricula to include African, Asian and Latino families.
