= Cea Weaver =

American city official and tenant organizer

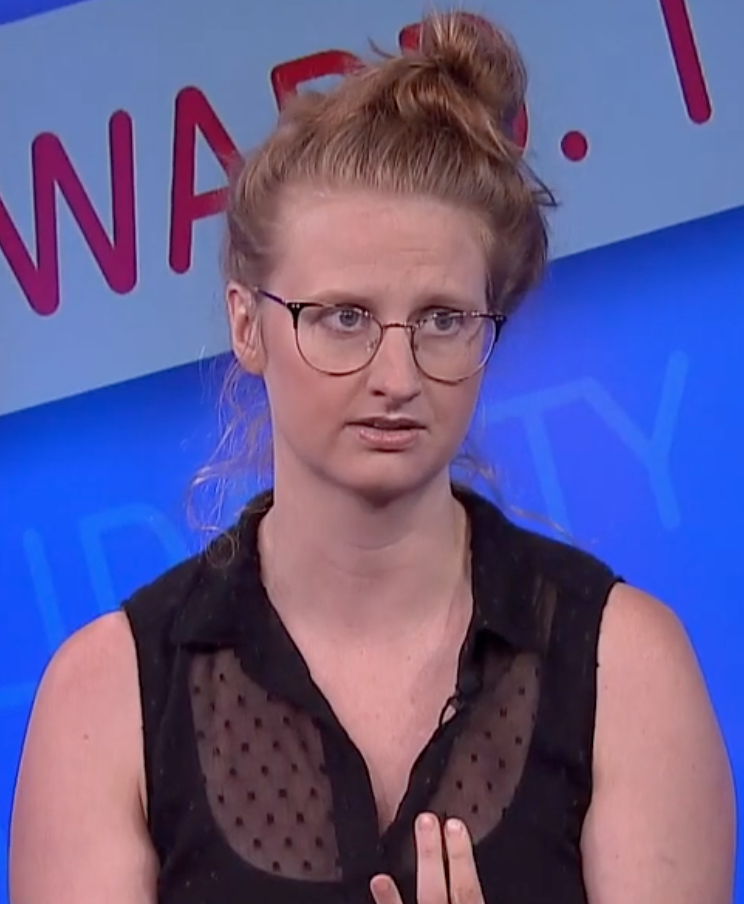
- Weaver in 2019

Director of the New York City Mayor's Office to Protect Tenants
- Incumbent
- Assumed office January 1, 2026
- Appointed by: Zohran Mamdani

Personal details
- Born: 1988 or 1989 (age 36–37)
- Party: Democratic
- Other political affiliations: Democratic Socialists of America
- Education: Bryn Mawr College (BA); New York University (MA)

Cea Weaver is an American tenant organizer who serves as the director of the New York City Mayor's Office to Protect Tenants since 2026. She previously coordinated the statewide organization Housing Justice for All and was a central figure in the campaign that led to the passage of the Housing Stability and Tenant Protection Act of 2019. A member of the Democratic Socialists of America, Weaver has advocated for rent strikes and regulations that prioritize housing for community use rather than profit. She was appointed to her current municipal role by Mayor Zohran Mamdani on January 1, 2026.

== Early life and education ==
Weaver was born in 1988 or 1989 and grew up in Rochester, New York. She completed a Bachelor of Arts in Growth and Structure of Cities at Bryn Mawr College in 2010. Weaver earned a Master of Arts in Urban Planning from New York University's Wagner Graduate School of Public Service in 2014. Her father, Stewart Weaver, is a professor of history at the University of Rochester. Her mother, Celia Applegate, is a professor at Vanderbilt University.

== Career and activism ==
=== Early activism ===
Following her graduation in 2010, Weaver worked as an AmeriCorps volunteer, organizing in multi-family buildings that were facing foreclosure during the aftermath of the financial crisis. She began her career in tenant organizing in New York City that same year. From 2010 to 2015, Weaver focused on organizing for tenant control over rent-stabilized housing in Crown Heights. During this period, she helped form the Crown Heights Tenant Union (CHTU) to advocate for rent stabilization on a broader level.

Weaver was a leader in the formation of the Upstate-Downstate Housing Alliance in 2017, which sought to unite renters across New York State. She helped form and served as the coordinator for the statewide tenant organization Housing Justice for All, as well as the director of the New York State Tenant Bloc. In this capacity, she was a central figure in the campaign that led to the passage of the Housing Stability and Tenant Protection Act of 2019. The legislation eliminated vacancy decontrol and tightened regulations on rent increases for stabilized apartments.

=== Political career ===
Weaver is a member of the Democratic Socialists of America (DSA) and served on the steering committee of its New York City chapter as of 2019. She has stated that her interest in socialism stemmed from her experiences witnessing the housing crisis and the "unmooring" of the concept of homeownership for her generation. In 2017, she posted that voters should "elect more communists".

During the COVID-19 pandemic in New York City in 2020, Weaver advocated for rent strikes as a form of collective political action to pressure the government for intervention. She argued for "turning a moment where people cannot pay into a moment of political activity." On her X account, she vocally supported the #CancelRent movement and supported residents participating in eviction blockades.

In 2021, New York City Public Advocate Jumaane Williams nominated Weaver to the City Planning Commission. However, following controversy surrounding her social media activity, Williams withdrew her nomination.

On January 1, 2026, newly inaugurated New York City mayor Zohran Mamdani appointed Weaver as the director of the Mayor's Office to Protect Tenants. Mamdani stated that the office would be "reinvigorated" under her leadership to defend tenants' rights and ensure swift agency action on unsafe conditions.

=== Controversial social media posts ===
Following her appointment by Mamdani, deleted posts from Weaver's Facebook and X accounts reemerged that critics characterized as racially charged and radical. Weaver's comments included a post celebrating the government's "sacred right to seize private property", a 2018 post calling to "impoverish the white middle class" and labeling homeownership as "racist", and a 2019 post arguing that "homeownership is a weapon of white supremacy masquerading as 'wealth building' public policy".

Her remarks led to backlash from political opponents and property owner advocacy groups, who argued the views were extreme for a city official overseeing housing policy. Former New York City mayor Eric Adams commented on X that, "Homeownership is how immigrants, Black, Brown, and working-class New Yorkers built stability and generational wealth despite every obstacle. You have to be completely out of your f****ing mind to call that 'white supremacy'." In response to the criticism, a spokesman for Mamdani said "she was vetted... we were aware of all of these tweets" and defended Weaver’s record as a tenant organizer, stating she would "work with us to hold landlords accountable and ensure New York City tenants are living in safe, clean homes". In an interview, Weaver called some of her comments "regretful" and "not something I would say today".

Government offices
Preceded by Office re-established	Director of the New York City Mayor's; Office to Protect Tenants; 2026–present	Incumbent
