= Roger L. Green =

Member of the New York State Assembly

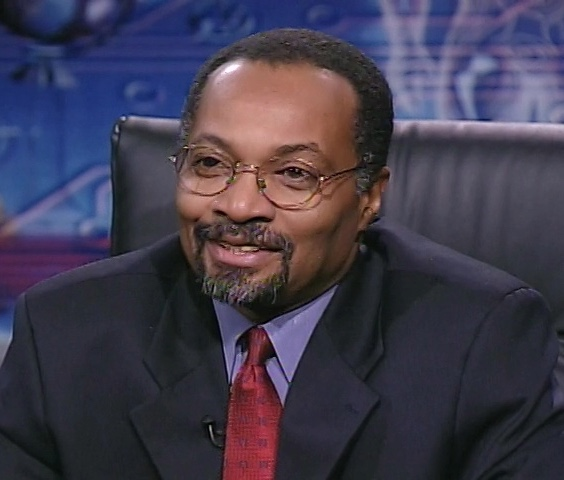
- Green discusses education vouchers on CUNY TV's Education Forum (2001)

Member of the New York State Assembly from the 57th district
- In office January 1, 2005 – December 31, 2006
- Preceded by: Vacant
- Succeeded by: Hakeem Jeffries
- In office January 1, 1981 – June 1, 2004
- Preceded by: Harvey L. Strelzin
- Succeeded by: Vacant

Personal details
- Born: June 23, 1949 (age 77) Brooklyn, New York, U.S.
- Party: Democratic
- Spouse: Coraminita Mahr
- Children: 3
- Education: Southern Illinois University

Roger L. Green (born June 23, 1949) is an American legislator who served in the New York State Assembly for 26 years, from 1981 to 2007 (with a brief interruption in 2004), representing District 57 which, allowing for redistricting adjustments, has primarily comprised the New York City borough of Brooklyn neighborhoods Fort Greene, Clinton Hill, Prospect Heights, Park Slope and Bedford-Stuyvesant. He was the first Muslim member of the Assembly.

== Early years ==
A native of Brooklyn, Roger L. Green was raised in a family with a long history of participation in the struggles to advance human rights and economic justice. He was educated in the New York City public school system and graduated from Southern Illinois University, where he attained a triple major in Cultural Anthropology, International Affairs and Government. After graduation and return to Brooklyn, he became involved in local politics, joining several civil rights groups and community organizations concerned with the elimination of racism and social injustice. He was raised Baptist but converted to Islam in the early 1970s.

== Member of New York State Assembly ==
After a historic election that required him to win an unprecedented three primary runoffs, Roger Green was elected to the New York State Assembly in November 1980. He was a member of the State Assembly (57th D.) from 1981 to 2006 (with an interruption in 2004), sitting in the 184th, 185th, 186th, 187th, 188th, 189th, 190th, 191st, 192nd, 193rd, 194th, 195th, and 196th New York State Legislatures. During his tenure in public office, he distinguished himself as an architect of laws, policies and institutions that defined his commitment to civil and human rights within New York State, the nation, and the world community. Beginning in 1981, he participated in numerous mass mobilizations and legislative mobilizations dedicated to the abolition of police brutality. In response to the deaths of Luis Baez, Randolph Evans and Eleanor Bumpurs, Green authored legislation creating the Center for Law and Social Justice at Medgar Evers College. This social justice advocacy organization has become a renowned transformative vehicle for the abolition of racial injustice. The center worked with the New York City Council to author the disparity study, which quantified discriminatory practices within the construction industry.

In 1983, Coretta Scott King and labor leader Cleveland Robinson asked Green to serve as the New York State political coordinator for the Memorial March on Washington. It was during this period that Green authored the bill that established the New York State Martin Luther King Holiday Commission and the bill establishing the New York State Martin Luther King Institute. In 1985 and 1986, in conjunction with the founding of the federal Martin Luther King Jr. Day, Governor Cuomo signed these bills into law.

From 1986 to 1988, Green served his first tenure as chair of the New York State Black and Puerto Rican Legislative Caucus. During his term, the caucus was viewed as the preeminent voice in support of laws designed to reduce and prosecute racial violence. Following the racial killing of Michael Griffith in the Bensonhurst section of Brooklyn, Green joined the Reverend Al Sharpton, Reverend Timothy Mitchell and Reverend Herbert Daughtry in citywide protests entitled the Day of Outrage. After his arrest for civil disobedience, Green returned to Albany and worked with Assemblyman Arthur O. Eve in the co-authorship of the New York State Anti-Bias Bill. This bill was the first comprehensive legislation to include prosecution for violence against members of the gay community. In 1994, Ralph J. Marino, the N.Y. senate majority leader of the Republican Caucus, presented Green and Eve with an opportunity to pass their bill if they would agree to drop "gay rights" language from their proposal. Green, Eve, and other members of the Caucus considered this an unprincipled compromise. During a debate within the Assembly, Green quoted Martin Luther King Jr.'s admonition that "an injustice anywhere is a threat to justice everywhere"… Six years later, following a major "March for Justice" and lobbying effort, the anti-bias bill, authored by Green and Eve, was signed into law. From 1986 to 1991, the New York State Martin Luther King Institute trained more than 1,000 high school and college students through its Ella Baker Academy. Students participating in this program learned the theory and practice of non-violent conflict resolution. Students were also provided with an opportunity to study civil rights and human rights social history.

== South Africa and Rwanda ==
From 1982 to 1992, Green was actively involved in the global struggle to dismantle apartheid and to establish a free democratic South Africa. Green served as co-sponsor of the State Divestiture Bill, which was authored by Albert Vann. Green also served as political coordinator for the June 14 March Against Apartheid. It was the largest anti-apartheid demonstration in the history of the U.S. After the march, the U.N. Special Commission on Human Rights appointed Green as one of eight U.S. delegates to the World Conference Against Apartheid in Paris, which was organized to develop strategies to eliminate this injustice. After Nelson Mandela was released, Green worked directly with the leadership of the African National Congress, Harry Belafonte, and labor leaders Cleveland Robinson and Jim Bell to formulate the Nelson Mandela Welcoming Committee involved in Mandela’s historic visit to the U.S.

From 1989 to 2005, Green served with distinction as the chair of the Standing Committee on Children and Families in the New York State Legislature. During his tenure, Green authored numerous groundbreaking laws dedicated to protecting the rights of children. During the height of the genocidal conflict within Rwanda, Dr. Vera Makonde, representing survivors of this tragedy who lived in the U.S., urged Green to serve as the chair of the Rwanda Children's Aid Committee. He accepted this responsibility. As chair of the Committee, he raised moral and material support for the children who were orphaned or made refugees as a result of this crisis.

== Resignation ==
Green resigned his seat on June 1, 2004, after pleading guilty to petty larceny in connection with $99.00 in false travel reimbursement claims. As part of a plea deal, he served three years' probation, and had to pay $99.00 in restitution.

Later that year, he ran for the Assembly and was re-elected to the same seat he had held.

== 2006 Congressional campaign ==
In 2006, Green campaigned to unseat 10th congressional district Representative Edolphus Towns On September 12, 2006, Green came in third, losing to both incumbent Ed Towns and City Councilman Charles Barron. On the same day, Hakeem Jeffries, Green's long-time political opponent, was elected to succeed him in the Assembly district which he had retired from to launch his unsuccessful bid for Congress.

== Medgar Evers College ==
In 2007, shortly after the end of Green's term in the State Legislature, the chancellor of the City University of New York and the president of Medgar Evers College, appointed him as a distinguished lecturer. Green taught a course exploring the historical significance of the freedom amendments — the U.S. Constitution’s 13th, 14th, 15th and 19th — and their influence on state and local government. Green is also the director of the Dubois-Bunche Center on Public Policy, a think tank dedicated to advancing best practices in law, policy, and community covenants for urban justice within the U.S. and throughout the African Diaspora.

== Family ==
Roger Green is married to labor rights and human rights advocate, Coraminita Mahr; is the father of three children, Corlita, Khalid and Imani; and has one grandchild, Belle. He spends time writing poetry and essays that explore, among other things, the commonalities between diverse people and cultures and the physical, mental, and spiritual well being of the world's children.

New York State Assembly
Preceded by Harvey L. Strelzin	Member of the New York State Assembly from the 57th district 1981–2004	Succeeded by Vacant
Preceded by Vacant	Member of the New York State Assembly from the 57th district 2005-2007	Succeeded by Hakeem Jeffries
