= Walter T. Mosley =

American politician

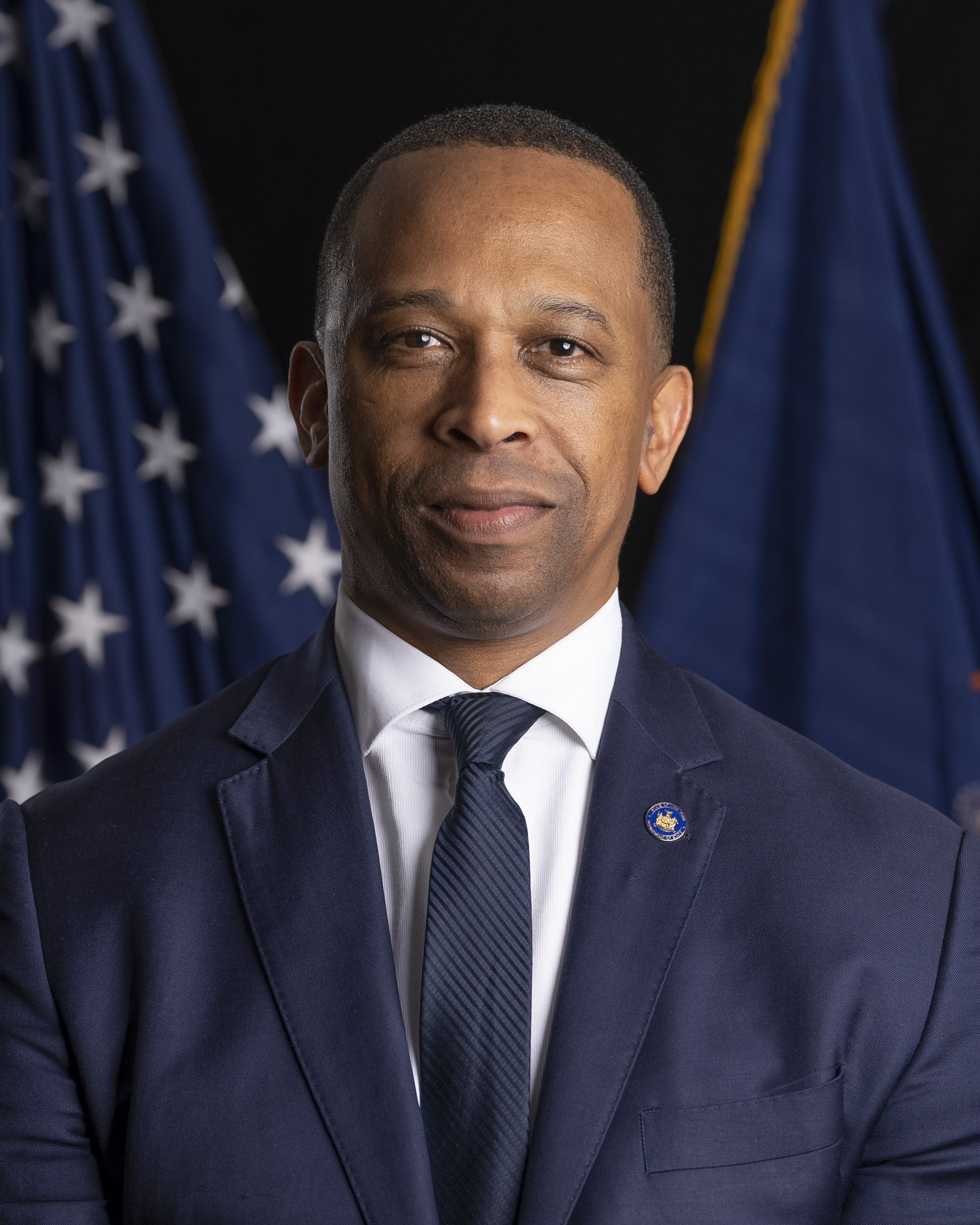
- Official portrait, 2024

68th Secretary of State of New York
- Incumbent
- Assumed office May 22, 2024
- Governor: Kathy Hochul
- Preceded by: Brendan Hughes (acting)

Member of the New York State Assembly from the 57th district
- In office January 3, 2013 – January 1, 2021
- Preceded by: Hakeem Jeffries
- Succeeded by: Phara Souffrant Forrest

Personal details
- Party: Democratic
- Education: Pennsylvania State University (BS); Howard University (JD)

Walter T. Mosley III is an American politician and civil servant from the state of New York. A Democrat, Mosley represented New York's 57th State Assembly district from 2013 to 2021; the district included the Brooklyn neighborhoods of Fort Greene, Clinton Hill, Prospect Heights, as well as portions of Crown Heights and Bedford-Stuyvesant. In 2020, Mosley lost a Democratic primary to Phara Souffrant Forrest. Mosley has served as the New York Secretary of State since 2024.

== Education ==
Mosley attended Pennsylvania State University, where he obtained his bachelor's degree in criminology. He received his J.D. degree from Howard University in 1998.

== New York State Assembly ==
Mosley ran to fill Hakeem Jeffries's Assembly seat in the 57th district in 2012 when Jeffries ran for Congress. Mosley won the Democratic primary with 62.8% of the vote, beating out Olanike T. Alabi and Martine Guerrier. He handily defeated Republican challenger Francis J. Voyticky, who Hakeem Jeffries had beaten in 2010, in the general election with 97.6% of the vote. Mosley ran unopposed in 2014, 2016, and 2018, running on both the Democratic and Working Families Party lines in 2016 and 2018.

=== East Ramapo School District bill ===
Mosley was originally a co-sponsor of a bill to place a monitor with veto power in the East Ramapo School District in Rockland County, an Orthodox Jewish-dominated school district that was diverting funds to yeshivas. Mosley took his name off of the bill after meeting with both sides, saying that the discussion about the bill has anti-Semitic overtones. He refused to meet with the sponsor of the bill, a 71-year-old former East Ramapo schoolteacher, and ultimately did not vote on the bill.

=== 2020 Democratic primary defeat ===
In the Democratic primary on June 23, 2020, Mosley faced Phara Souffrant Forrest; Forrest was his first primary challenger since 2012. While Mosley led Forrest by 588 votes on election night, absentee ballots were more significant than usual due to the COVID-19 pandemic. On July 22, 2020, once absentee ballots had been counted, Forrest was declared the winner of the primary by over 2,500 votes.

== Secretary of State ==
Mosley was nominated to the position of Secretary of State by Gov. Kathy Hochul, and was confirmed by the New York State Senate on May 22, 2024.

== Electoral history ==
New York's 57th State Assembly district Democratic Primary, 2012
Party	Candidate	Votes	%
Democratic	Walter T. Mosley, III	4,565	62.8
Democratic	Olanike T. Alabi	2,168	29.8
Democratic	Martine Guerrier	535	7.4
Total votes		7,268	100

New York's 57th State Assembly district General Election, 2012
Party	Candidate	Votes	%
Democratic	Walter T. Mosley, III	46,733	97.6
Republican	Francis J. Voyticky	1,111	2.3
n/a	Write-ins	44	0.1
Total votes		47,888	100.0
Democratic hold			

New York's 57th State Assembly district Democratic Primary, 2020
Party	Candidate	Votes	%
Democratic	Phara Souffrant Forrest	15,711	55.5%
Democratic	Walter T. Mosley III	12,609	44.5%
Total votes		29,622	100

Political offices
Preceded by Brendan Hughes; Acting	Secretary of State of New York; 2024–present	Incumbent
