= Celia Applegate =

Historian and ethnomusicologist

- Born: November 16, 1959 (age 66); Elmira, New York, U.S.

Academic background
- Education: Bryn Mawr College; Stanford University

Academic work
- Discipline: Modern History; Musicology
- Institutions: Vanderbilt University; University of Rochester

Celia Stewart Applegate is professor and William R. Kenan, Jr. Professor of History and Affiliate Faculty of Musicology and Ethnomusicology at the Blair School of Music, both at Vanderbilt University. A scholar of modern German history, Professor Applegate has previously taught history at Smith College and the University of Rochester, where she served as director of the Susan B. Anthony Center for Women's Studies and held an Affiliate Faculty position in the Department of Musicology at the Eastman School of Music.

Applegate received her bachelor of arts degree summa cum laude from Bryn Mawr College, majoring in history at Haverford College through the two schools' longstanding cooperative relationship. She earned her PhD in German history from Stanford University in 1987, where she focused on the development of German national and regional identity in the 19th and 20th centuries.

Applegate's daughter, Cea Weaver, is the Director of the New York City Mayor's Office to Protect Tenants under Zohran Mamdani.

== Works ==
- A Nation of Provincials: The German Idea of Heimat. University of California Press. 1990. ISBN 978-0-520-06394-5.
- "A Europe of Regions: Reflections on the Historiography of Sub-National Places in Modern Times", American Historical Review, October 1999.
- Celia Applegate and Pamela Potter, Music and German National Identity, August 2002, ISBN 978-0-226-02130-0.
- Bach in Berlin: Nation and Culture in Mendelssohn's Revival of the St. Matthew Passion. Cornell University Press, 2005, ISBN 978-0-8014-4389-3.
- The Necessity of Music: Variations on a German Theme. University of Toronto Press, 2017, ISBN 978-1-4875-0068-9.
