= Black America Since MLK: And Still I Rise =

Black America Since MLK: And Still I Rise is a 4-hour series that aired on PBS in 2016. The show features interviews and archival footage. Henry Louis Gates Jr. wrote, produced, and narrates the series.

Gates said the series was framed around the question: "If Malcolm X and Martin Luther King, Jr. woke up and they asked you, 'What's happened since I died?,' what would you tell them?" The show explores class division in the African American community and includes interviews with Oprah Winfrey, Cornel West, Nas, and Jesse Jackson as well as coverage of the Watts riots of 1965, the emergence of hip hop, The Cosby Show, the Rodney King beating, crack epidemic, Michael Jackson, Hurricane Katrina, and Black Lives Matter. It was produced at WETA-TV in Washington D.C.

The Brookings Institution held an event centered on the film. A book was published in conjunction with the film.

== Reviews ==
Rob Lowman of Los Angeles Daily News says, "A celebration...of black culture."

== See also ==
- The African Americans: Many Rivers to Cross
