= New York's 57th State Assembly district =

American legislative district

Assemblymember
Phara Souffrant Forrest; D–Fort Greene
- Registration: 80.4% Democratic; 2.7% Republican; 14.2% No party preference
- Demographics: 33% White; 42% Black; 13% Hispanic; 7% Asian; 1% Other; 4% Multiracial
- Population (2018): 140,470
- Registered voters: 112,742

New York's 57th State Assembly district is one of the 150 districts in the New York State Assembly. It has been represented by Democrat Phara Souffrant Forrest since 2020. Among the seat's former occupants include New York Secretary of State Walter Mosley and House Minority Leader Hakeem Jeffries.

== Geography ==
=== 2020s ===
District 57 is located in central and northern Brooklyn, comprising the neighborhoods of Fort Greene and Clinton Hill, and parts of Prospect Heights, Crown Heights, Bedford–Stuyvesant and Vinegar Hill.

The district overlaps (partially) with New York's 7th, 8th, 9th and 10th congressional districts, the 20th, 25th and 26th districts of the New York State Senate, and the 33rd, 35th and 36th districts of the New York City Council.

=== 2010s ===
District 57 is located in central and northern Brooklyn, comprising all (or most of) the neighborhoods of Fort Greene, Prospect Heights and Clinton Hill, and parts of Crown Heights and Bedford–Stuyvesant.

== Representation ==
District 57 was served by Roger L. Green from 1981 until June 1, 2004, when Green resigned his seat after pleading guilty to petty larceny in connection with $3,000 in false travel reimbursement claims. He was sentenced to three years' probation, fined $2,000, and had to pay $3,000 in restitution. However, he ran for the seat again a few months later and was reelected on November 2, 2004.

Green served one final term from 2005 to 2007, but then announced his retirement from the Assembly to run for Congress, a race that he lost. Hakeem Jeffries, who had challenged Green in the Democratic primary in 2000, won the Democratic primary and the general election in 2006. Jeffries served until 2013, when he retired from the Assembly to serve in Congress.

Walter T. Mosley won the open race for the seat in 2012, and has served since 2013. Mosley has served unopposed since he was first elected, but faced his first primary challenge on June 23, 2020, against Phara Souffrant Forrest.

== Recent election results ==
=== 2026 ===
2026 New York State Assembly election, District 57
Primary election
Party	Candidate	Votes	%
Democratic	Phara Souffrant Forrest (incumbent)	12,866	78.5
Democratic	Samantha Johnson	3,386	20.7
Write-in		135	0.8
Total votes		16,387	100.0
General election
Democratic	Phara Souffrant Forrest		
Working Families	Phara Souffrant Forrest		
Total	Phara Souffrant Forrest (incumbent)		
Republican	Yolanda Allison		
Write-in			
Total votes			100.0

=== 2024 ===
2024 New York State Assembly election, District 57
Party	Candidate	Votes	%
Democratic	Phara Souffrant Forrest (incumbent)	47,424	99.3
Write-in		317	0.7
Total votes		47,741	100.0
Democratic hold			

=== 2022 ===
2022 New York State Assembly election, District 57
Primary election
Party	Candidate	Votes	%
Democratic	Phara Souffrant Forrest (incumbent)	9,495	67.3
Democratic	Olanike Alabi	4,579	32.4
Write-in		46	0.3
Total votes		14,120	100.0
General election
Democratic	Phara Souffrant Forrest	27,116	
Working Families	Phara Souffrant Forrest	9,116	
Total	Phara Souffrant Forrest (incumbent)	36,232	99.4
Write-in		223	0.6
Total votes		36,455	100.0
Democratic hold			

=== 2020 ===
Assemblyman Mosley faced his first contested election since 2012 in the Democratic primary on June 23, 2020, against Phara Souffrant Forrest.

2020 New York State Assembly election, District 57
Primary election
Party	Candidate	Votes	%
Democratic	Phara Souffrant Forrest	15,711	55.4
Democratic	Walter T. Mosley (incumbent)	12,609	44.5
Write-in		46	0.1
Total votes		28,366	100.0
General election
Democratic	Phara Souffrant Forrest	47,347	76.1
Working Families	Walter T. Mosley (incumbent)	14,794	23.8
Write-in		110	0.1
Total votes		62,251	100.0
Democratic hold			

=== 2018 ===
2018 New York State Assembly election, District 57
Party	Candidate	Votes	%
Democratic	Walter T. Mosley	43,621	
Working Families	Walter T. Mosley	5,857	
Total	Walter T. Mosley (incumbent)	49,478	99.7
Write-in		137	0.3
Total votes		35,726	100.0
Democratic hold			

=== 2016 ===
2016 New York State Assembly election, District 57
Party	Candidate	Votes	%
Democratic	Walter T. Mosley	49,410	
Working Families	Walter T. Mosley	5,648	
Total	Walter T. Mosley (incumbent)	55,058	99.7
Write-in		148	0.3
Total votes		55,206	100.0
Democratic hold			

=== 2014 ===
2014 New York State Assembly election, District 57
Party	Candidate	Votes	%
Democratic	Walter T. Mosley (incumbent)	19,946	99.5
Write-in		95	0.5
Total votes		20,041	100.0
Democratic hold			

=== 2012 ===
2012 New York State Assembly election, District 57
Primary election
Party	Candidate	Votes	%
Democratic	Walter T. Mosley	4,565	62.6
Democratic	Olanike Alabi	2,168	29.7
Democratic	Martine Guerrier	535	7.3
Write-in		23	0.4
Total votes		7,291	100.0
General election
Democratic	Walter T. Mosley	46,733	97.6
Republican	Francis Voyticky	1,111	2.3
Write-in		44	0.1
Total votes		47,888	100.0
Democratic hold			

=== 2010 ===
2010 New York State Assembly election, District 57
Party	Candidate	Votes	%
Democratic	Hakeem Jeffries	21,577	
Working Families	Hakeem Jeffries	4,322	
Total	Hakeem Jeffries (incumbent)	25,899	97.5
Republican	Francis Voyticky	652	2.5
Write-in		9	0.0
Total votes		26,560	100.0
Democratic hold			

=== 2008 ===
2008 New York State Assembly election, District 57
Party	Candidate	Votes	%
Democratic	Hakeem Jeffries	37,078	
Working Families	Hakeem Jeffries	2,914	
Total	Hakeem Jeffries (incumbent)	39,992	98.0
Republican	Charles Brickous	801	2.0
Write-in		12	0.0
Total votes		40,805	100.0
Democratic hold			

=== 2006 ===
2006 New York State Assembly election, District 57
Primary election
Party	Candidate	Votes	%
Democratic	Hakeem Jeffries	6,370	63.9
Democratic	William Batson	2,513	25.2
Democratic	Freddie Hamilton	1,079	10.8
Write-in		2	0.0
Total votes		9,964	100.0
General election
Democratic	Hakeem Jeffries	16,125	
Working Families	Hakeem Jeffries	3,426	
Total	Hakeem Jeffries	19,551	96.9
Republican	Henry Weinstein	478	
Conservative	Henry Weinstein	135	
Total	Henry Weinstein	613	3.0
Write-in		9	0.0
Total votes		20,173	100.0
Democratic hold			

=== 2004 ===
2004 New York State Assembly election, District 57
Party	Candidate	Votes	%
Democratic	Roger Green	30,300	92.7
Republican	Ricardo Ocasio	1,633	5.0
Write-in		749	2.3
Total votes		32,682	100.0
Democratic hold			

=== 2002 ===
2002 New York State Assembly election, District 57
Primary election
Party	Candidate	Votes	%
Democratic	Roger Green (incumbent)	5,775	62.1
Democratic	Hakeem Jeffries	3,522	37.9
Write-in		0	0.0
Total votes		9,297	100.0
General election
Democratic	Roger Green	15,862	
Working Families	Roger Green	2,161	
Total	Roger Green (incumbent)	18,023	96.3
Republican	Rick Ocasio	700	3.7
Write-in		0	0.0
Total votes		18,723	100.0
Democratic hold			

=== 2000 ===
2000 New York State Assembly election, District 57
Party	Candidate	Votes	%
Democratic	Roger Green	26,006	
Working Families	Roger Green	2,200	
Total	Roger Green (incumbent)	28,206	90.1
Independence	Hakeem Jeffries	1,466	
Liberal	Hakeem Jeffries	788	
Total	Hakeem Jeffries	2,254	7.2
Republican	Arthur Goodridge	832	2.7
Write-in		1	0.0
Total votes		31,293	100.0
Democratic hold			

=== Federal results in Assembly District 57 ===
Year	Office	Results
2024	President	Harris 89.2 - 7.9%
2024	Senate	Gillibrand 92.2 - 6.5%
2022	Senate	Schumer 94.4 - 5.0%
2020	President	Biden 95.1 - 3.8%
2018	Senate	Gillibrand 98.0 - 2.0%
2016	President	Clinton 94.7 - 2.2%
2016	Senate	Schumer 93.0 - 3.9%
2012	President	Obama 96.6 - 1.9%
2012	Senate	Gillibrand 96.3 - 1.7%
