= Hakeem Jeffries =

American politician (born 1970)

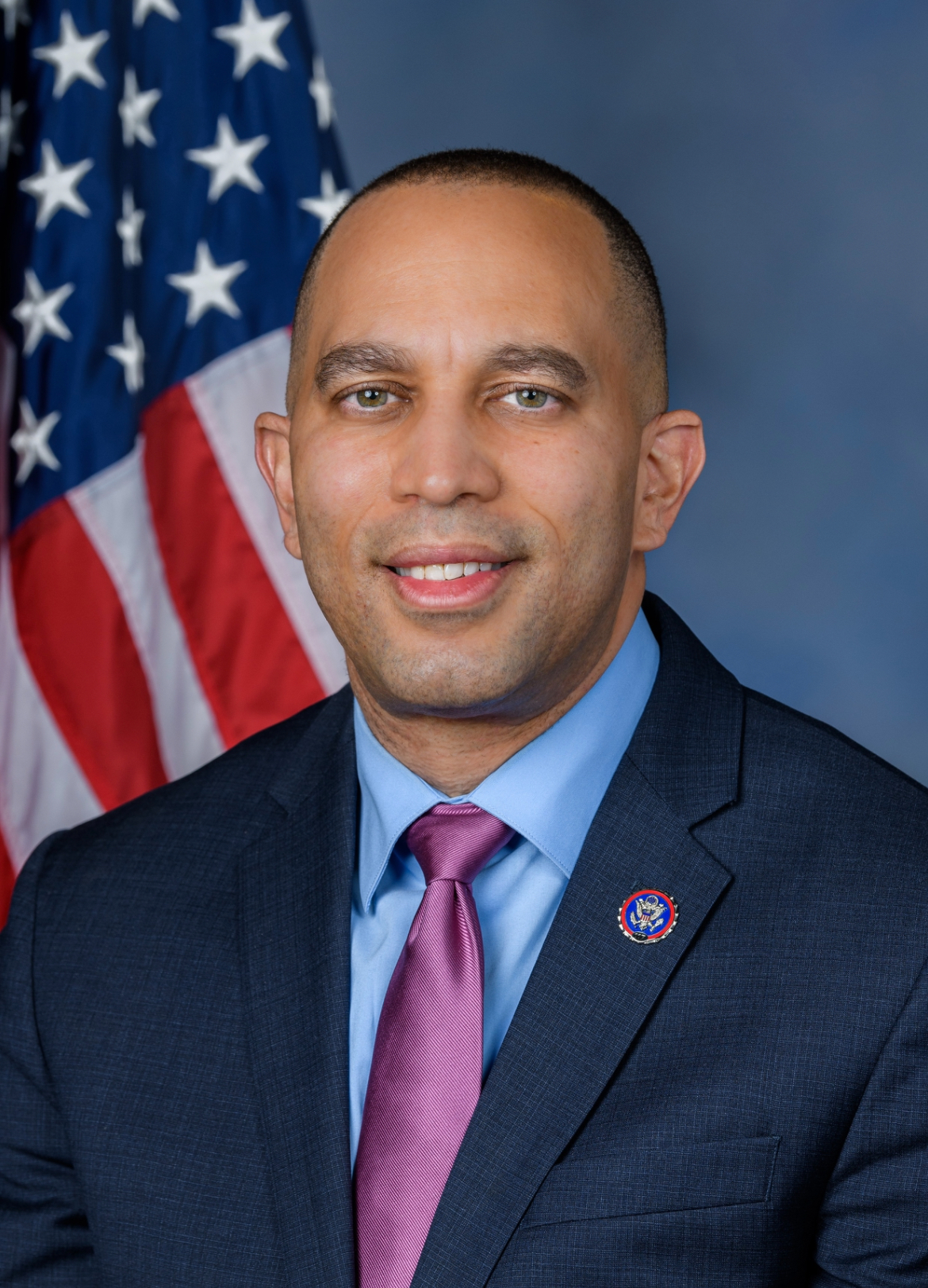
- Official portrait, 2021

House Minority Leader
- Incumbent
- Assumed office January 3, 2023
- Whip: Katherine Clark
- Preceded by: Kevin McCarthy

Leader of the House Democratic Caucus
- Incumbent
- Assumed office January 3, 2023
- Deputy: Katherine Clark
- Preceded by: Nancy Pelosi

Chair of the House Democratic Caucus
- In office January 3, 2019 – January 3, 2023
- Leader: Nancy Pelosi
- Preceded by: Joe Crowley
- Succeeded by: Pete Aguilar

Co-chair of the House Democratic Policy and Communications Committee
- In office January 3, 2017 – January 3, 2019 Serving with Cheri Bustos and David Cicilline
- Leader: Nancy Pelosi
- Preceded by: Steve Israel (chair)
- Succeeded by: Matt Cartwright; Debbie Dingell; Ted Lieu

Member of the U.S. House of Representatives from New York's 8th district
- Incumbent
- Assumed office January 3, 2013
- Preceded by: Edolphus Towns (redistricted)

Member of the New York State Assembly from the 57th district
- In office January 1, 2007 – December 31, 2012
- Preceded by: Roger Green
- Succeeded by: Walter Mosley

Personal details
- Born: Hakeem Sekou Jeffries; August 4, 1970 (age 56) New York City, New York, U.S.
- Party: Democratic
- Spouse: Kennisandra Arciniegas (m. 1997)
- Children: 2
- Relatives: Hasan Kwame Jeffries (brother); Leonard Jeffries (uncle)
- Education: Binghamton University (BA); Georgetown University (MPP); New York University (JD)
- Website: House website Party website Campaign website
- Jeffries's voice Jeffries supporting the Malala Yousafzai Scholarship Act; Recorded March 3, 2020

Hakeem Sekou Jeffries (/hɑːˈkiːm/ hah-KEEM; born August 4, 1970) is an American politician and attorney serving since 2013 as the U.S. representative for New York's 8th congressional district. From 2007 to 2012, he represented the 57th district in the New York State Assembly. A member of the Democratic Party, Jeffries has served since 2023 as leader of the House Democratic Caucus and House minority leader. Jeffries is the Democratic nominee for the 2027 election of the Speaker for the 120th US Congress.

Jeffries was born in the New York City borough of Brooklyn and raised in the Crown Heights neighborhood. He attended law school at New York University, graduating with honors and becoming a corporate lawyer before running for elected office. Both his state assembly district and congressional district are anchored in Brooklyn.

In Congress, Jeffries chaired the House Democratic Caucus from 2019 to 2023. The members of the caucus unanimously elected him to succeed Nancy Pelosi as leader in November 2022, making him the first African American to lead a party in either chamber of the United States Congress.

== Early life and career ==
Jeffries was born on August 4, 1970, at the Brooklyn Hospital Center in the Downtown Brooklyn neighborhood of New York City, to Marland Jeffries, a state substance-abuse counselor, and Laneda Jeffries, a social worker. He has one brother, Hasan. He grew up in Crown Heights, Brooklyn, and is a lifelong member of the Cornerstone Baptist Church.

Jeffries graduated from Midwood High School in 1988. He then studied political science at Binghamton University, graduating in 1992 with a Bachelor of Arts degree with honors. During his time at Binghamton he became a member of the Kappa Alpha Psi fraternity.

Jeffries continued his education at the Georgetown Public Policy Institute of Georgetown University in Washington, D.C., earning a Master of Public Policy (M.P.P.) degree in 1994. He then attended the New York University School of Law, where he was a member of the New York University Law Review. He graduated in 1997 with a Juris Doctor, magna cum laude, and delivered the student address at convocation.

After law school, Jeffries was a law clerk to Judge Harold Baer Jr. of the U.S. District Court for the Southern District of New York from 1997 to 1998.

From 1998 to 2004, Jeffries was in private practice at the law firm Paul, Weiss, Rifkind, Wharton & Garrison. In 2004, he became a corporate litigator for television companies Viacom and CBS, where among other matters he worked on the Super Bowl XXXVIII halftime show controversy. During Jeffries's time at Paul, Weiss, he also served as director of intergovernmental affairs for the New York State Chapter of the National Association of Minority Contractors (construction contractors) and as the president of Black Attorneys for Progress.

== New York State Assembly (2007–2012) ==
Jeffries was elected and reelected in the 57th district, serving in the New York State Assembly from 2007 to 2012. During this time, he introduced over 70 bills.

In 2007, while still in his first term in the State Assembly, Jeffries endorsed and supported Barack Obama, and was among Obama's earliest supporters in Hillary Clinton's home state. In one interview, he said, "When I first ran for office, some people suggested that someone with the name 'Hakeem Jeffries' could never get elected, and when I saw someone with the name 'Barack Obama' get elected to the U.S. Senate, it certainly inspired me."

While in the Assembly, Jeffries worked on policing issues. In 2010, Governor David Paterson signed a Stop-and-Frisk database bill sponsored by Jeffries and then-Senator Eric Adams that banned police from compiling names and addresses of those stopped but not arrested during street searches.

Jeffries wrote and sponsored that law. He also sponsored and passed House Bill A.9834-A (now law), which stopped counting prison populations of upstate districts as part of those districts' population, becoming the second state to end this practice.

== U.S. House of Representatives (2013–present) ==
=== Early years in Congress (2013–2018) ===
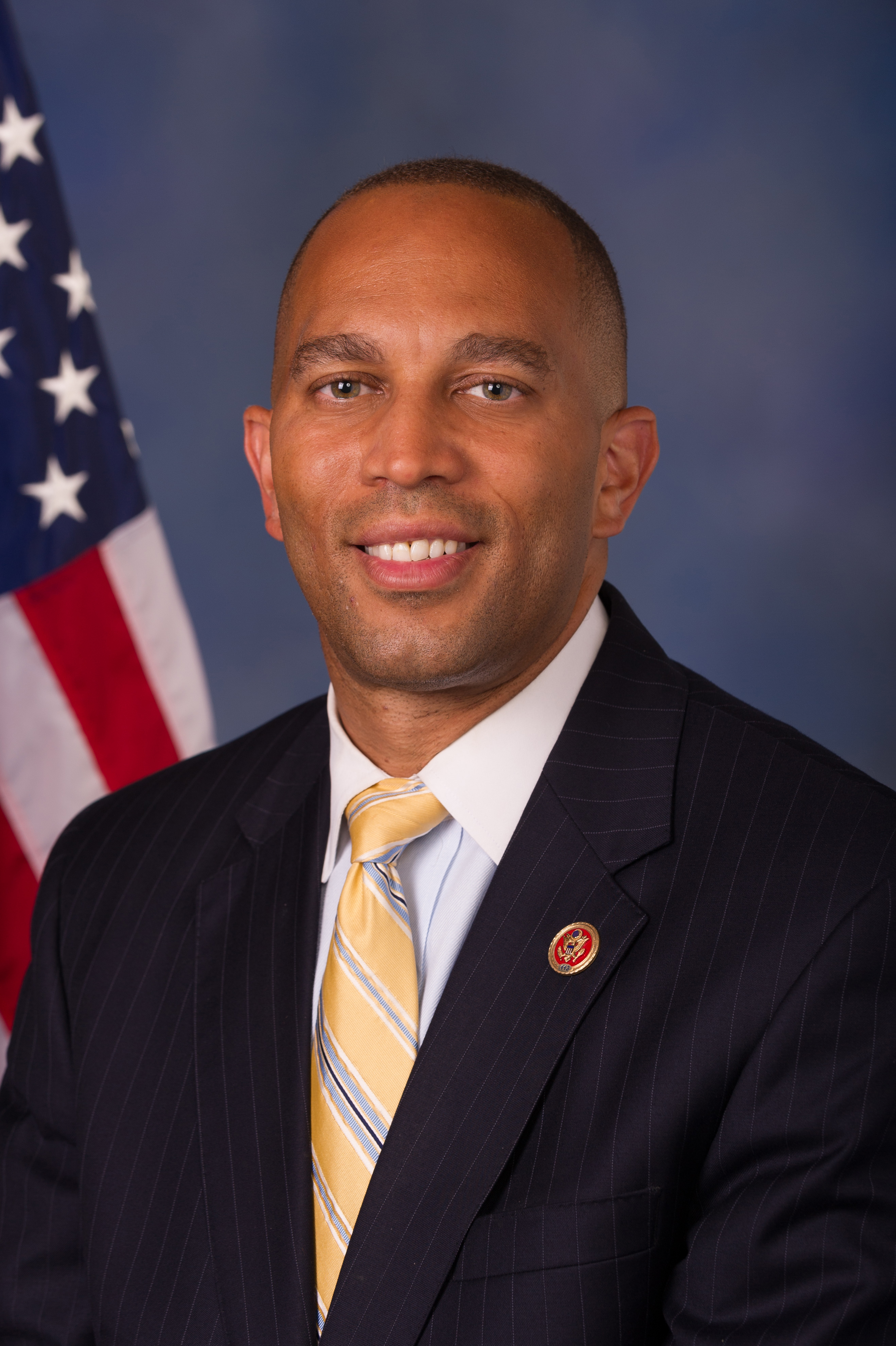
Jeffries during the 113th Congress

On July 15, 2014, Jeffries, who in private practice addressed intellectual property issues, introduced H.R. 5108, which would establish the Law School Clinic Certification Program of the United States Patent and Trademark Office (USPTO) to be available to accredited law schools for the ten-year period after enactment of the Act.

In 2015, Jeffries led the effort to pass the Slain Officer Family Support Act, which extended the tax deadline for people making donations to organizations supporting the families of deceased NYPD detectives Wenjian Liu and Rafael Ramos. The families of the officers, who had been killed in their patrol car on December 20, 2014, in the Bedford-Stuyvesant section of Jeffries's district, had been the recipients of charitable fundraising. Before the law's enactment, people would have had to make those contributions by December 31, 2014, to qualify for a tax deduction in connection with taxes filed in 2015. With the change, contributions made until April 15, 2015, were deductible. President Obama signed the bill into law on April 1, 2015.

In 2015, prominent African-American pastors called for Jeffries to step into the 2017 Democratic primary for mayor of New York City against Bill de Blasio. Jeffries said he had "no interest" and wished to remain a member of Congress.

On May 22, 2018, the U.S. House of Representatives passed the bipartisan First Step Act by a 358–36 vote with Jeffries as a key sponsor. The bill was the bipartisan product of Jeffries and Representative Doug Collins. President Trump signed it into law on December 21, 2018. It eased mandatory minimum federal sentences, expanded early releases, and ended the shackling of women inmates giving birth.

Jeffries also played a key role in the House passage of the bipartisan Music Modernization Act, which became law in 2018. Again, he teamed up with Collins in a bipartisan manner to introduce and pass this law.

Jeffries participates in Summer at the Subway, rebranded as "Congress on Your Corner", offering outdoor evening office hours from June through August near subway stations as outreach to constituents.

=== Democratic Caucus Chair (2018–2022) ===
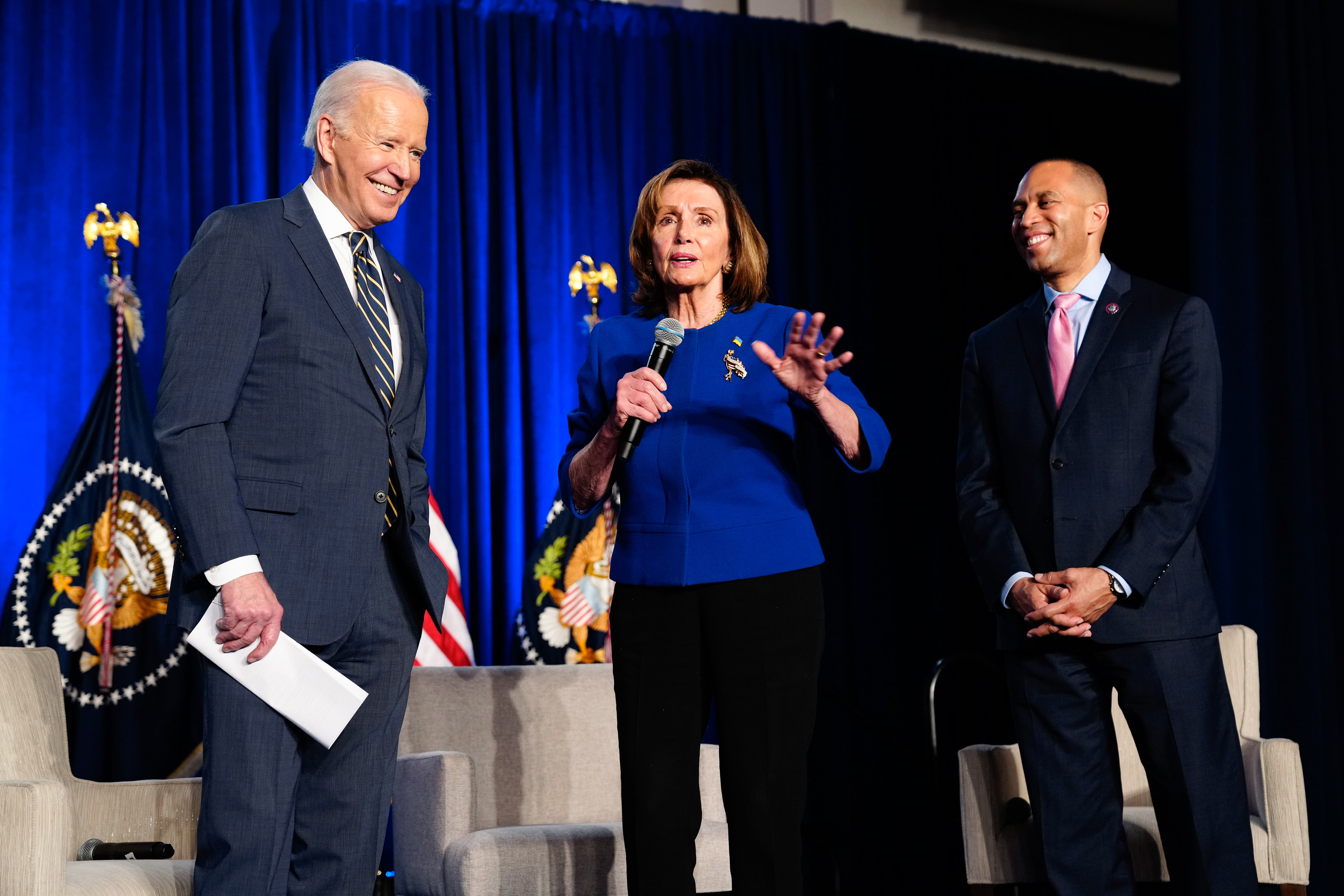
Jeffries with then-Speaker Nancy Pelosi and President Joe Biden in March 2022

On November 28, 2018, Jeffries defeated California congresswoman Barbara Lee to become chair of the House Democratic Caucus. His term began when the 116th Congress was sworn in on January 3, 2019. In this role, he was the fifth-ranking member of the Democratic leadership.

On January 15, 2020, Jeffries was selected as one of seven House managers presenting the impeachment case against Donald Trump during his trial before the United States Senate. On January 22, 2020, a protester in the Senate gallery interrupted Jeffries by yelling comments at the senators seated a floor below. Jeffries quickly responded with a scripture verse, Psalm 37:28, "For the Lord loves justice and will not abandon his faithful ones", before continuing with his testimony.

During the impeachment hearings, in response to Trump's counsel's rhetorical question "Why are we here?", Jeffries delivered a soliloquy that concluded by quoting The Notorious B.I.G.: "and if you don't know, now you know". Billboard magazine called it a "noteworthy mic-drop moment".

=== House Minority Leader (2022–present) ===
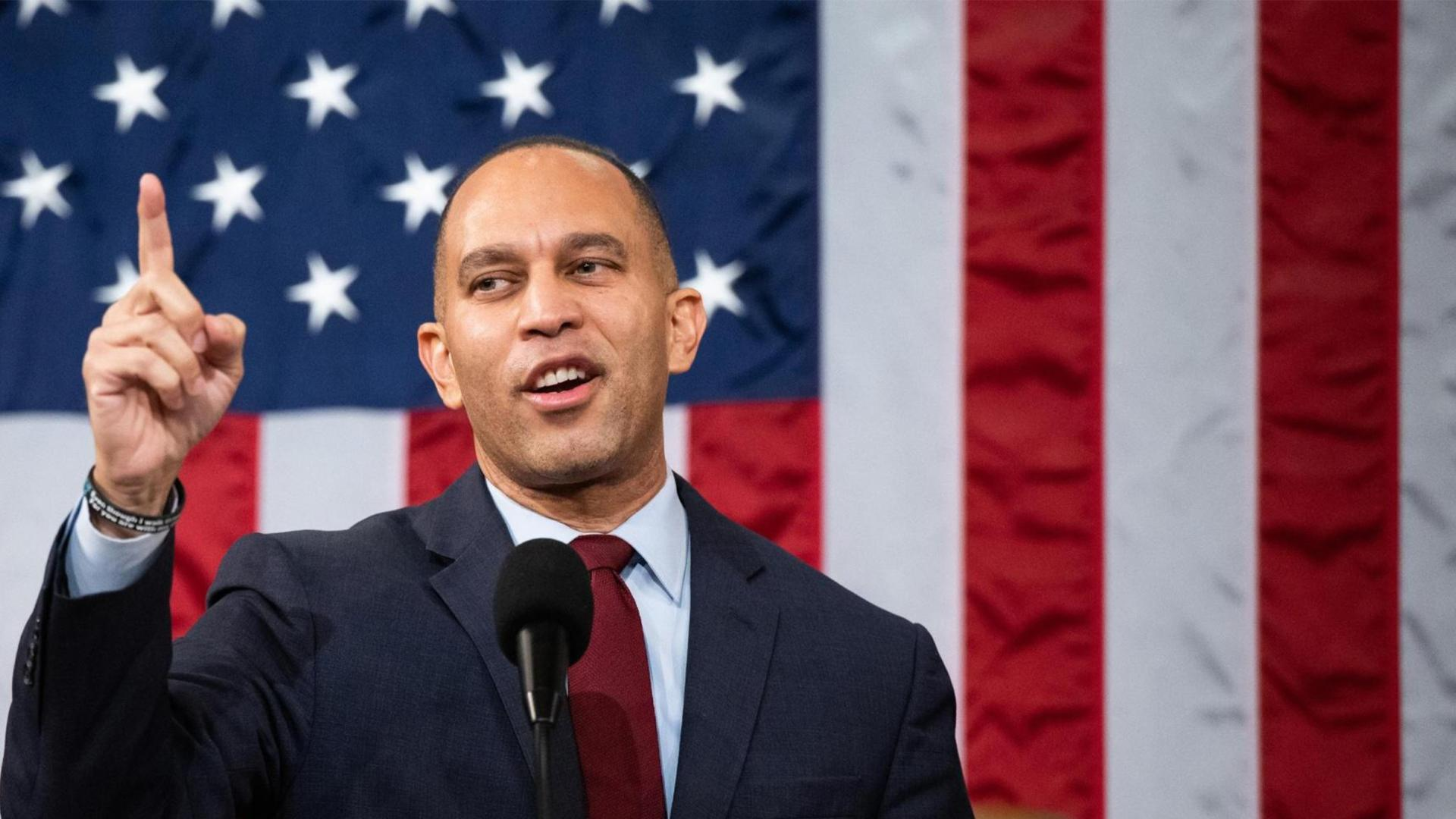
Jeffries delivers speech at the opening day of the 118th congress.

With outgoing Speaker Pelosi's endorsement, Jeffries was elected unopposed as House Democratic leader for the 118th Congress in November 2022, becoming the first African American to lead a party caucus in either chamber of Congress.

At the start of the 118th Congress on January 3, 2023, the House of Representatives began the nominating contest for Speaker of the House. The Democratic caucus unanimously nominated Jeffries for speaker. He received 212 votes, all from Democrats, on nearly every ballot. (David Trone missed the 12th round of voting for a surgery but returned for the 13th round.) Meanwhile, Kevin McCarthy, the Republican front-runner, failed to secure a majority of votes cast. On January 6, McCarthy finally received a majority and was elected on the 15th ballot after making concessions to the far right. In total, Jeffries received 3,179 votes for speaker.

When McCarthy was elected speaker, Jeffries handed him the gavel after a 15-minute speech. The speech, an alphabetical recitation of words describing what the government should and should not be, was dubbed the "ABCs of Democracy". The video of Jeffries's alphabet speech has been viewed over 2.4 million times on social media. On July 31, 2024, Jeffries announced he had penned an illustrated book, The ABCs of Democracy, to be published on November 12, 2024.

House Democrats unanimously nominated Jeffries again in the October 2023 election after the successful motion to vacate McCarthy's speakership.

===== Fiscal Responsibility Act of 2023 =====
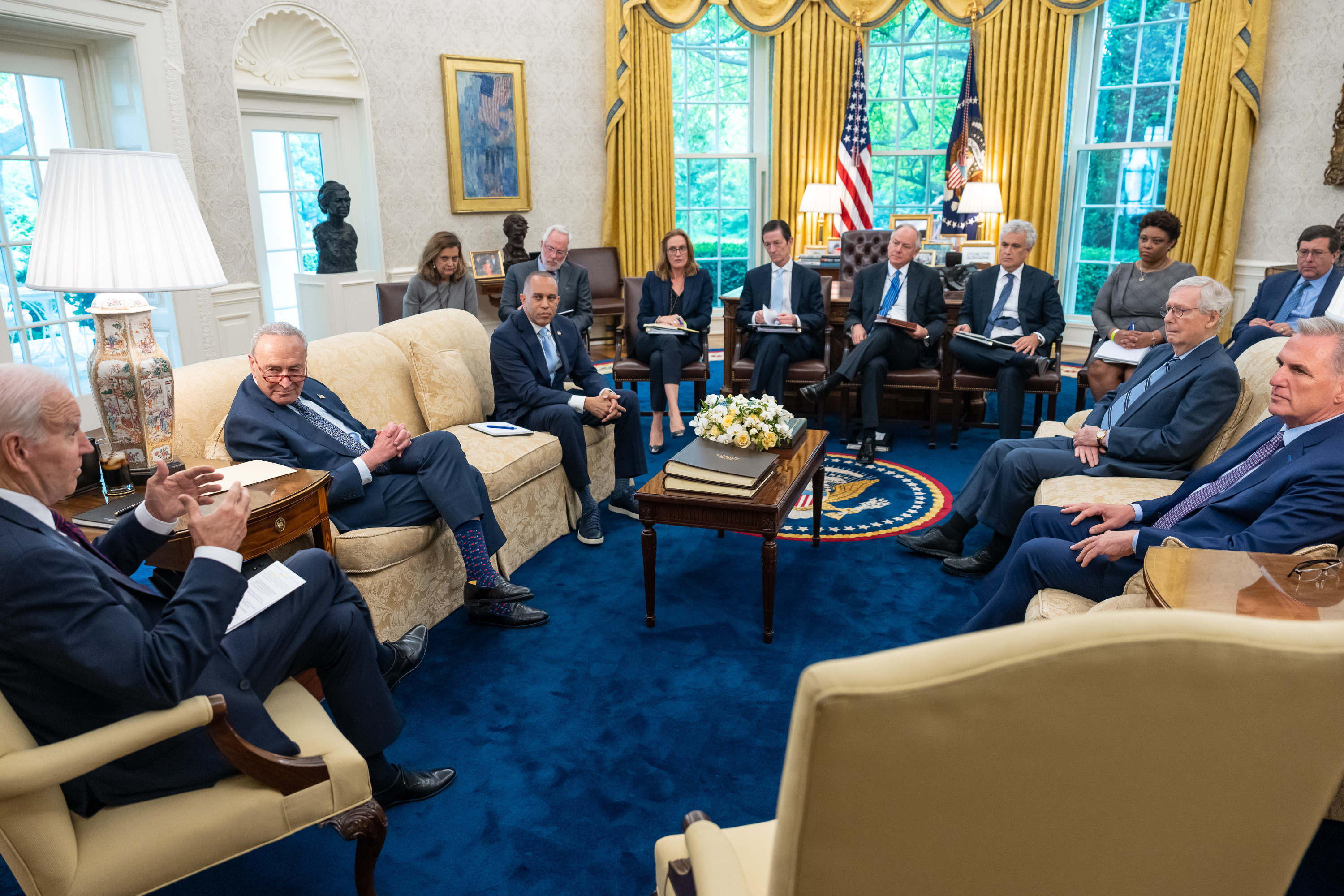
Jeffries discusses the debt ceiling in White House with President Joe Biden and congressional leaders in May 2023.

The first major test of the 118th Congress was the looming expiration of the nation's debt ceiling. Economists warned that a breach and subsequent default would be catastrophic. On May 29, 2023, Representative Patrick McHenry introduced the Fiscal Responsibility Act of 2023. Democrats initially resisted the measure. When the Fiscal Responsibility Act was brought for a vote on May 31, Jeffries held up a green card to alert Democrats that they could vote in favor of it; over 50 did. The Fiscal Responsibility Act was signed into law on June 3 and is estimated to have reduced the deficit by $1.5 trillion over 10 years.

===== Removal of Speaker McCarthy =====
On October 3, 2023, Representative Matt Gaetz filed a motion to vacate the speakership criticizing McCarthy for working with Democrats to pass a spending bill which did not include fiscally conservative reforms. Preceding the vote, Jeffries said in a letter to colleagues that House Democratic leaders would vote “yes” on the motion to vacate the chair. After listing off reasons not to keep McCarthy in power, Jeffries said Democrats “remain willing to find common ground on an enlightened path forward.”

Immediately after Gaetz filed his motion to vacate, an attempt to remove the motion through a motion to table was filed by Representative Tom Cole, a McCarthy ally, but it was voted down by House Democrats and eleven Republicans.

Following the removal of McCarthy, Jeffries published a column in the Washington Post calling for a “bipartisan governing coalition” in which he pitched a path for consensus legislation that could not be blocked by a “small handful of extreme members” when large swaths of the House supported a bill. The column ultimately signaled a governing coalition Jeffries led from the with reports beginning to describe him as de facto or shadow Speaker of the House.

===== Governing by coalition =====
In December 2023, Jeffries led the House Democratic Caucus in providing the majority of the votes, 163–147, to pass the National Defense Authorization Act, allowing it to pass under suspension of the rules. The bill included a 5.2% pay increase. On January 7, 2024, Jeffries and congressional leaders agreed to a $1.59 trillion topline spending deal. The topline spending levels agreed to for 2024 were not substantially different from the deal McCarthy and President Biden had negotiated.

On March 6, the House passed a $459 billion "minibus" spending package containing six of the 12 appropriations bills. The bill funded the departments of Agriculture, Commerce, Justice, Energy, Interior, Veterans Affairs, Transportation, and Housing and Urban Development, along with the EPA, the Army Corps of Engineers, and other military construction. Jeffries led negotiations and applauded Democrats for ensuring the WIC program remained untouched, as well as providing rental assistance, a pay raise for firefighters and investments in new air traffic controllers. After the vote, he said, "Once again, Democrats protected the American people and delivered the overwhelming majority of votes necessary to get things done."

On March 22, the House passed a second $741 billion minibus to fund the remaining departments with Democratic support; a majority of Republicans voted against the package. Jeffries touted the work of the bipartisan coalition, saying: "We've said from the very beginning of this Congress, as Democrats, that we will find bipartisan common ground with our Republican colleagues on any issue, whenever and wherever possible, as long as it will make life better for the American people. That's exactly what House Democrats continue to do". As part of negotiations to avert a government shutdown, Jeffries helped secure at least one project as an earmark for every Democratic member. Ranking Member of the House Appropriations Committee Rosa DeLauro said, "He negotiated. He got what we needed to have".

On April 12, the House passed a modified surveillance bill that reauthorized the Foreign Intelligence Surveillance Act. The final vote was 273–147, with Democrats delivering votes to protect national security under Section 702. Biden signed the legislation hours before the program expired. On April 20, over two months after the Senate had passed a funding bill for Israel, Taiwan, and Ukraine, Jeffries negotiated a legislative path for the bill and delivered a majority of Democratic votes to pass a package providing aid to the three countries in separate bills, each of which passed Congress with bipartisan support and large majorities and was signed into law by Biden. Three Freedom Caucus members voted against the bill in committee, but all Democrats voted for it. The legislative package also included a House-passed bill to force the app TikTok to divest from its Chinese Communist Party-owned parent company, ByteDance, as well as the REPO for Ukrainians Act, which allows the U.S. government to fund the Ukrainian war effort with assets seized from Russian oligarchs. During debate on the bill, Jeffries emphasized the role of the bipartisan legislative coalition, saying, "We have a responsibility, not as Democrats or Republicans, but as Americans, to defend democracy wherever it is at risk". In an interview with 60 Minutes after the vote, he said House Democrats "effectively have been governing as if we were in the majority."

On May 15, the House passed the FAA Reauthorization Act of 2024, which included programs to improve safety and protect consumers, with more Democrats (195) than Republicans (192) voting for it. After the votes to avert a federal government shutdown and send foreign assistance abroad, the Associated Press said that Jeffries, as the minority leader, "might very well be the most powerful person in Congress right now".

===== Killing second motion to vacate attempt =====
As far-right Republicans issued warnings about a Motion to Vacate the Chair after a series of bills passed with the support of a majority of Democrats, Jeffries hinted at providing a lifeline to Speaker Mike Johnson in an interview with the New York Times. On May 8, 2024, Representative Marjorie Taylor Greene, who had strongly opposed Johnson's resolve to provide Ukraine with further aid, introduced the motion to vacate his speakership on the floor, forcing a vote on it. Citing Johnson's decision to hold a vote on the legislative package to aid allies abroad, Jeffries and Democratic leaders said Democrats would vote to table Greene's motion. The House voted to table the motion, 359-43, allowing Johnson to remain speaker. 196 Republicans and 163 Democrats voted to table the motion; 11 Republicans and 32 Democrats voted against tabling it. The Democrats who supported Johnson said they did so because of the vital role he had played in passing funding for the federal government and supporting Ukraine. Greene did not rule out forcing another vote to oust Johnson, but the Wall Street Journal wrote that Jeffries "flexes power as Mike Johnson flounders".

===== Start of Trump's second term =====
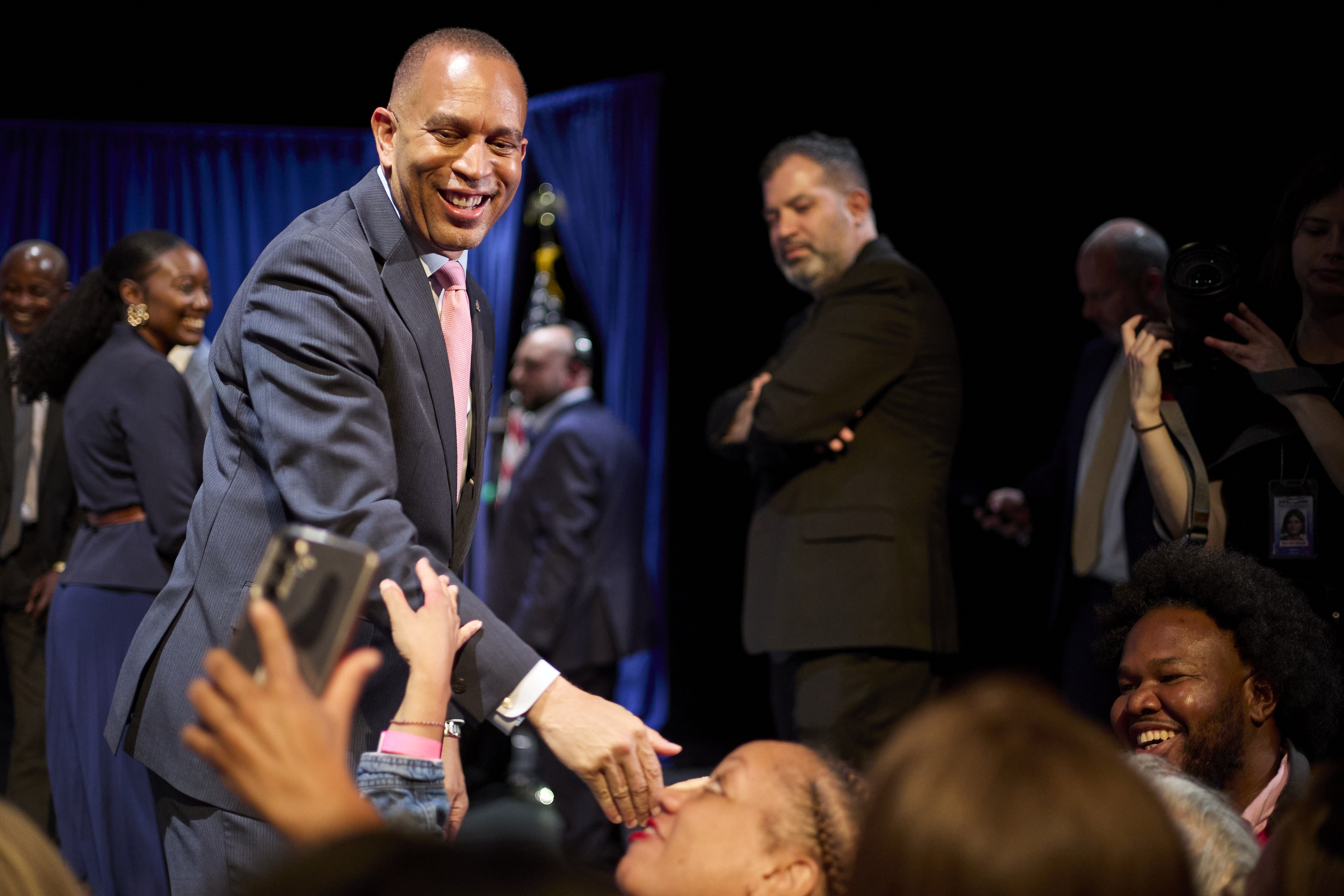
Jeffries working the rope line at the Atlas Performing Arts Center in Washington, D.C. in 2025

Jeffries attended Trump's second inauguration on January 20, 2025. On February 3, Jeffries laid out a 10-part plan to fight Trump and congressional Republicans legislatively while Democrats were in the minority in both chambers of Congress in a "dear colleague" letter to House Democrats. He vowed to use a March 14 federal funding deadline as leverage to prevent Trump from freezing or diverting congressionally appropriated funds. Jeffries also said Democrats would introduce a bill to prevent "unlawful access" to the Treasury Department's payment system after the Department of Government Efficiency reportedly obtained forced access to it over the objections of top officials.

On March 11, the House passed a continuing resolution. Jeffries was credited with keeping House Democrats unified in opposition to the continuing resolution. The 217–213 vote went almost entirely along party lines. On March 12, Jeffries, Clark, and Aguilar announced support for a four-week continuing resolution to allow Congress to reach a final agreement. On March 14, the U.S. Senate passed the House-version of the bill, almost entirely along partisan lines. The Senate voted 54–46 as the Democratic base clamored for a fight in the Senate. Ultimately, Senate Minority Leader Chuck Schumer decided it was not worth risking a shutdown that could empower Trump and Elon Musk. After the vote, Jeffries, Clark, and Aguilar held an emergency press conference ahead of the government funding deadline in which they laid out the House Democratic vision for government funding. Asked whether it was time for new Senate leadership, Jeffries replied, "Next question."

On February 24, Jeffries wrote a "dear colleagues" letter in response to House Republicans' budget framework to set in motion the cuts needed to reauthorize Trump's 2017 tax law. In the letter, Jeffries lambasted Republicans for the cuts to Medicaid in their tax package.

On April 27, after House Republicans passed their budget framework, Jeffries and Senator Cory Booker held an event on the Capitol steps to protest the proposed Medicaid cuts. The sit-in began around 6 a.m. and lasted over 12 hours. A few days later, Jeffries gave a speech marking Trump's first 100 days in office in which he called Republicans in Congress a "rubber stamp" for Trump's agenda of "chaos, cruelty, and corruption" and said that Democrats would lay out a "blueprint for a better America".

On July 3, during the 119th Congress, after months of negotiations, the House voted on the One Big Beautiful Bill Act. Jeffries used his magic minute to speak for eight hours and 44 minutes in opposition to the bill, from 4:53am to 1:38pm. He broke former Speaker Kevin McCarthy's record of eight hours and 32 minutes, set in 2021. In his remarks, Jeffries discussed his background as son of a veteran, called the bill an "all-out assault" on workers, shared stories of Americans who would be hurt by the bill, quoted Martin Luther King Jr., and read from Matthew 25:35–40. He said he would "take my sweet time" and asked the American people to imagine a nation where anyone who works hard can live a good life.

===== 2025 government shutdown =====
During the 2025 United States federal government shutdown, Jeffries played a central role in shaping the Democratic response to the budget impasse. Jeffries and House Democrats framed the dispute primarily around health care policy, particularly the expiration of enhanced Affordable Care Act (ACA)'s premium tax credits, a key point of contention between Democrats and Republicans during negotiations.

During the summer of 2025, Jeffries had urged the White House and congressional Republicans to negotiate in an attempt to reach a bipartisan budget agreement and avert a funding lapse. As the funding deadline approached, he and Senate Democratic Leader Chuck Schumer sought direct talks with President Trump; Trump ultimately met with them at the White House on September 29, 2025, shortly before the deadline, marking Jeffries’s first meeting with Trump during his second presidency.

Jeffries became involved in procedural disputes related to the shutdown, including the delayed swearing-in of Representative-elect Adelita Grijalva, whose certification and seating in the House became entangled in broader political tensions during the standoff. Democrats viewed the delay as politically motivated and tied to ongoing congressional maneuvering during the shutdown, as well as Republican hesitation to force a vote on releasing the Epstein files.

When the government reopened after 43 days, the longest full government shutdown in history, Jeffries continued to pursue legislation addressing the health care issue that had dominated the shutdown. In November 2025, he filed a discharge petition to force a House vote on extending ACA premium tax credits for three years, an effort intended to bypass Republican leadership and bring the issue directly to the House floor. In December 2025, his discharge petition to force a vote on extending the enhanced ACA tax credits reached the required 218 signatures after several Republicans joined Democrats.

The measure was brought to the House floor and passed on January 8, 2026, by a vote of 230-196, with all Democrats and several Republicans voting in favor of the three-year extension. The vote was seen as a political setback for House Republican leadership and the Trump administration, as a group of Republican lawmakers from competitive districts broke ranks to support the measure. This underscored internal Republican divisions over health care policy and made health care affordability a key issue in the 2026 United States elections.

==== Democratic fundraiser and leader ====
Jeffries speaking on the House Floor on the opening day of the 119th Congress

Since assuming the role of leader, Jeffries has become a prominent fundraiser and operative for the party. In 2023, he raised $113 million for Democratic candidates and campaign committees, including $99 million for the Democratic Congressional Campaign Committee (DCCC). The DCCC under Jeffries's control consistently set fundraising records in the 2024 election, raising $280.9 million for the cycle as of October 2024. The SuperPAC affiliated with Jeffries, House Majority PAC, also broke fundraising records.

Jeffries's first major political test as leader came in February 2024, after George Santos was expelled from Congress. For the special election to fill the vacancy, Jeffries tapped former representative Tom Suozzi. Jeffries deployed his political team and key allies across the district and helped raise $1 million for the special election, holding fundraisers for Suozzi in New York, Washington and elsewhere.

Jeffries had a prime-time speaking slot at the 2024 Democratic National Convention, and gave a speech inspired by Psalm 30:5. He endorsed Kamala Harris for president and likened Donald Trump to "an old boyfriend". Essence wrote that Jeffries delivered the speech with the "cadence of a seasoned preacher".

=== Caucus membership ===
- Black Maternal Health Caucus
- Congressional Black Caucus
- Congressional Ukrainian Caucus
- U.S.–Japan Caucus
- Congressional Caucus on Turkey and Turkish Americans
- Congressional Taiwan Caucus

=== Committee assignments ===
==== 119th Congress ====
No committee assignments as party leader; ex-officio member of United States House Permanent Select Committee on Intelligence.

==== 118th Congress ====
No committee assignments as party leader; ex-officio member of United States House Permanent Select Committee on Intelligence.

==== 117th Congress ====
- Committee on the Judiciary
  - Subcommittee on Courts, Intellectual Property and the Internet
  - Subcommittee on Antitrust, Commercial, and Administrative Law
- Committee on the Budget

==== 116th Congress ====
- Committee on the Judiciary
  - Subcommittee on Courts, Intellectual Property, and the Internet
  - Subcommittee on Crime, Terrorism, and Homeland Security
- Committee on the Budget

==== 115th Congress ====
- Committee on the Judiciary
  - Subcommittee on Courts, Intellectual Property, and the Internet
  - Subcommittee on Crime, Terrorism, Homeland Security, and Investigations
- Committee on the Budget

==== 114th Congress ====
- Committee on Education and Workforce
  - Subcommittee on Health, Employment, Labor, and Pensions
  - Subcommittee on Higher Education and Workforce Training
- Committee on the Judiciary
  - Subcommittee on Courts, Intellectual Property, and the Internet
  - Subcommittee on Crime, Terrorism, Homeland Security, and Investigations

==== 113th Congress ====
- Committee on the Judiciary
  - Subcommittee on Courts, Intellectual Property, and the Internet
  - Subcommittee on Regulatory Reform, Commercial and Antitrust Law
- Committee on the Budget

== 2027 Speaker of the House election ==
Following Democrats' victory in 2026 midterms, Jeffries was nominated by House Democrats for Speaker of the House. He was backed by Pelosi again.

== Political positions ==
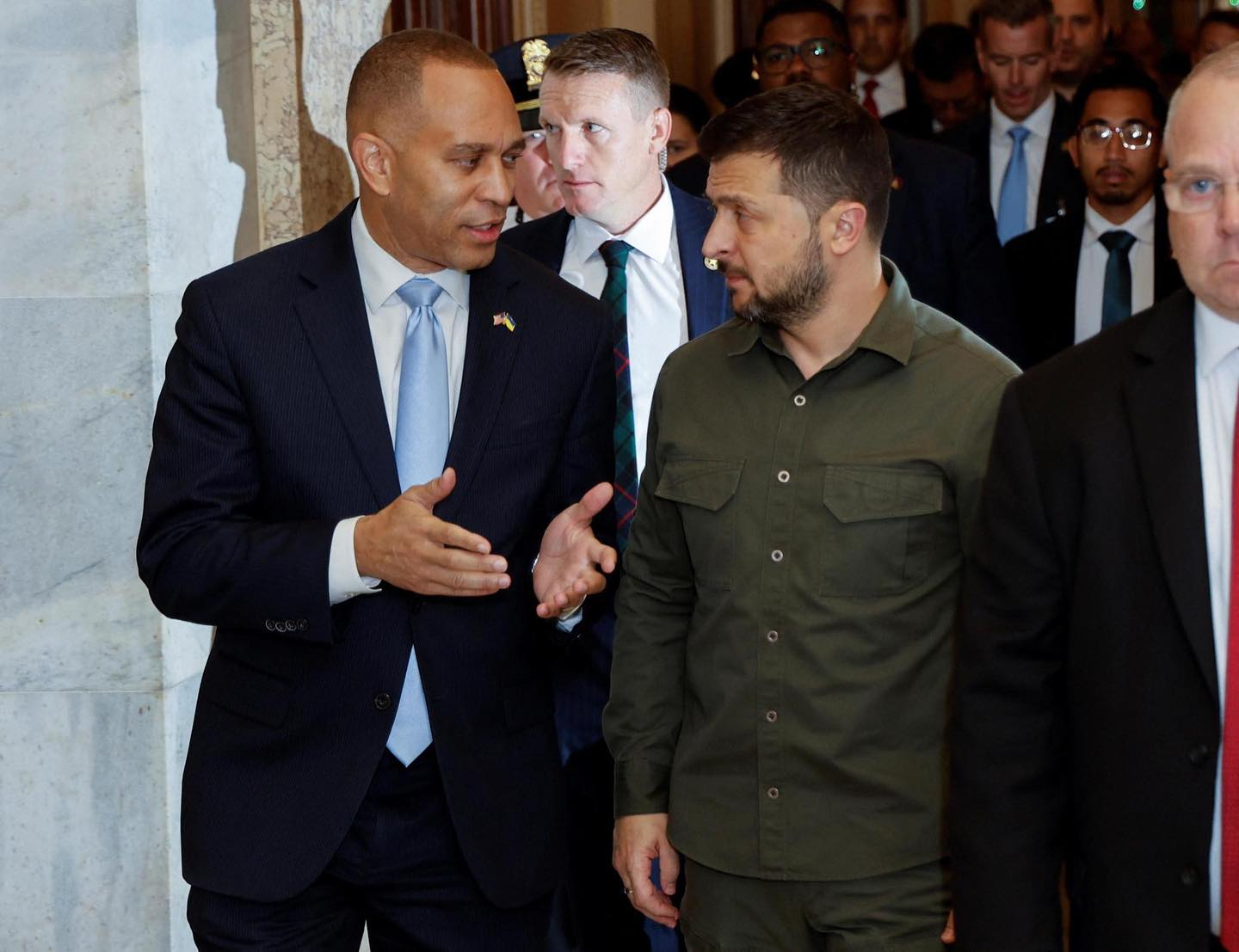
Jeffries with President Zelenskyy of Ukraine in September 2023

Since his first election, Jeffries has been labeled a "rising star" in the Democratic Party. He has said he is willing to work with Republicans "whenever possible, but we will also push back against extremism whenever necessary" while maintaining good working relationships with more progressive Democrats. He is a member of the Congressional Black Caucus and, before becoming caucus leader, was a member of the Congressional Progressive Caucus. Jeffries is noted for his ability to work with Democrats across the caucus and Republicans on shared goals. In an interview with NY1, Republican former U.S. representative Bob Goodlatte said of Jeffries: "One of the best skills a legislator can have is to be willing to communicate with anybody in a constructive way about how to get things done. And that's exactly the approach that he's taken", calling Jeffries "open to compromise".

In the 117th Congress, he voted with President Joe Biden's stated position 100% of the time according to a FiveThirtyEight analysis.

=== Relationship with democratic socialists ===
Jeffries distinguishes himself from democratic socialists, and considers himself "a Black progressive Democrat concerned with addressing racial and social and economic injustice with the fierce urgency of now" who will never "bend the knee to hard-left democratic socialism". In explaining this distinction, Jeffries said, "Black progressives do tend to tackle issues first and foremost with an understanding that systemic racism has been in the soil of America for over 400 years... Hard-left progressives tend to view the defining problem in America as one that is anchored in class. That is not my experience as a Black man in this country."

In 2022, Jeffries and Josh Gottheimer founded Team Blue PAC, with the stated goal of financing Democratic incumbents in their contests against left-wing primary challengers.

=== Campaign contributors ===
Members of the Democratic Party's left wing have been critical of Jeffries's donations from people in the investment and real estate industries. In the 2019-2020 election cycle, Jeffries received $1.1 million in contributions from the finance, real estate, and insurance sectors. Less than 2% of Jeffries's campaign funding comes from small donors, whose contributions are below $200. In 2025, Jeffries received backing from executives at Anduril and Palantir, as well as the cryptocurrency industry and Wall Street investors.

=== Congressional Black Caucus ===
Before becoming House Democratic Leader, Jeffries served as the Congressional Black Caucus whip, having been elected to the position in November 2014. In that role, he was actively involved in maintaining the CBC's historic role as "the conscience of the Congress", addressing special orders on the House floor, including regarding voting rights (after the Supreme Court decision on the 1965 Voting Rights Act), and in December 2014 leading CBC members in a "hands up, don't shoot" protest of killings of African-Americans by police.

After the shootings in Charleston in June 2015 by a white supremacist inspired by the Confederate flag, Jeffries led the effort to have the flag removed for sale or display on National Park Service land, an amendment the Republican House leadership eventually killed after its initial support and inclusion on voice vote. During debate on the House floor, Jeffries stood next to the Confederate battle flag, said he "got chills", and lamented that the "Ghosts of the Confederacy have invaded the GOP".

=== Criminal justice reform ===
Shortly after taking office, Jeffries was appointed to the House Judiciary Committee Task Force on Over Criminalization. He called for a Department of Justice investigation into the circumstances of Eric Garner's death. On a visit to the Staten Island site where Garner was killed, recorded by a CNN news crew in December 2014, Jeffries encountered Gwen Carr, Garner's mother. In April 2015, he stood with Carr to announce the introduction of the Excessive Use of Force Prevention Act of 2015, which would make chokeholds illegal under federal law.

=== Gun control ===
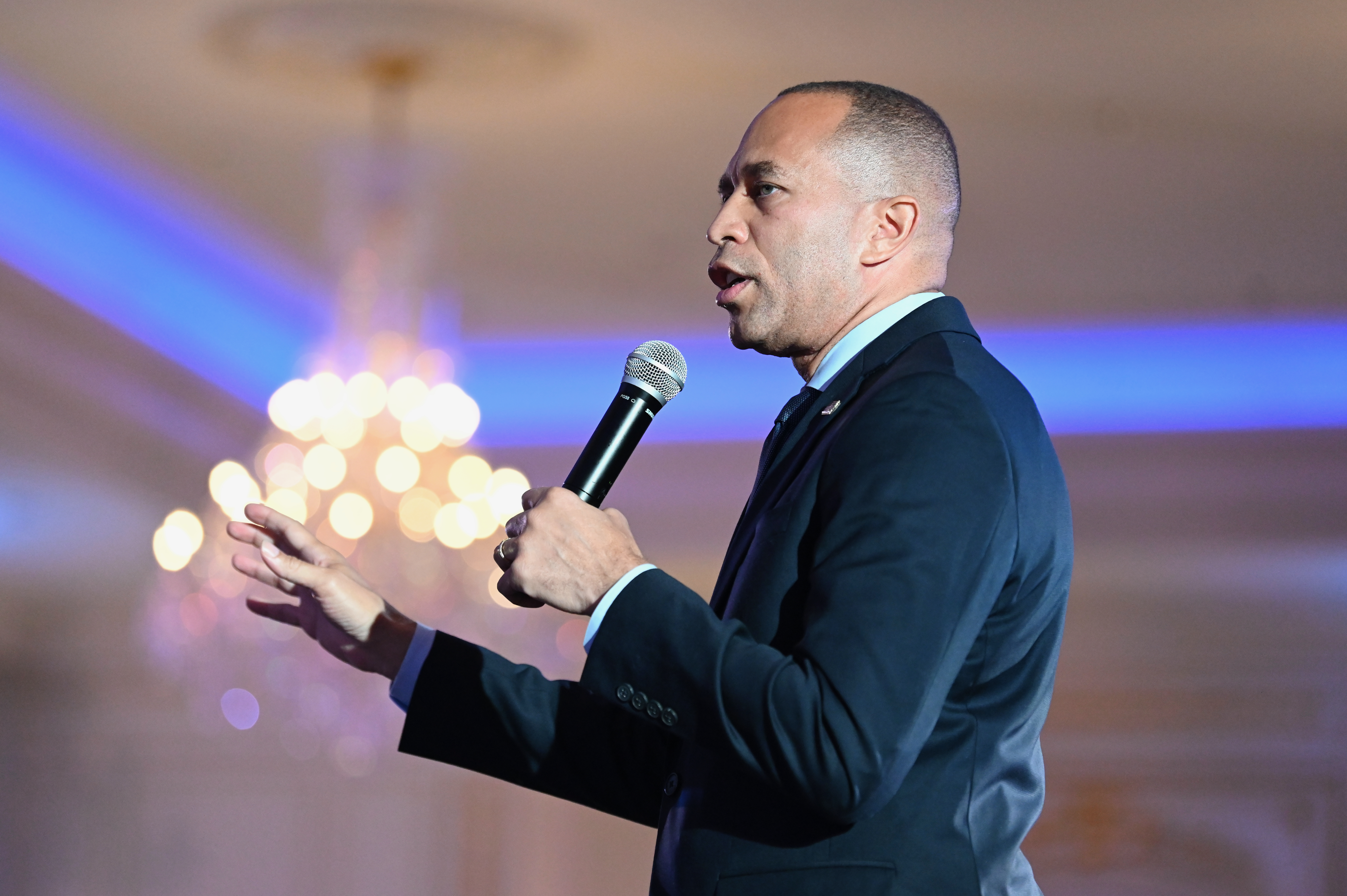
Jeffries speaking in 2023

Jeffries supports increased background checks for potential gun owners and a ban on assault weapons. After a mass shooting in Nashville, Tennessee left six people dead, he called on Congress to bring the Bipartisan Background Checks Act and assault weapons ban to the House floor. "Our schools have become killing fields and our children slaughtered by weapons of war. It is time for Congress to put kids over guns", Jeffries wrote to Speaker McCarthy.

=== Abortion rights ===
Jeffries criticized the 2022 Supreme Court ruling overturning Roe v. Wade, calling it "an assault on freedom, the Constitution and the values shared by a majority of Americans". The same year, he endorsed Texas Democrat Henry Cuellar, the only anti-abortion Democrat in the House. In 2025, he backed Donald Trump's pardon of Cuellar on corruption charges. In the 118th Congress, he joined House Democratic lawmakers to reintroduce the Women's Health Protection Act, a bill that would legally protect providing and accessing abortion care nationwide for patients and abortion providers.

=== LGBTQ rights ===
Jeffries supports banning discrimination based on sexual orientation and gender identity. In 2019, he voted in favor of the Equality Act and urged Congress members to do the same.

=== Environment ===
Jeffries has declined to endorse a Green New Deal. In June 2024, after New York governor Kathy Hochul indefinitely halted the implementation of congestion pricing in New York City, Politico reported that Hochul had acted in response to concerns raised by Jeffries. In August 2024, Jeffries reiterated that the ongoing pause was "a reasonable thing to do at this moment."

=== Cannabis ===
Jeffries reintroduced bipartisan legislation, the Preparing Regulators Effectively for a Post-Prohibition Adult Use Regulated Environment (PREPARE) Act, a bill that would create a transparent process for the federal government to establish effective regulations to be enacted upon the termination of cannabis prohibition. He also co-sponsored the Marijuana Opportunity Reinvestment and Expungement (MORE) Act, a bill that would end the federal prohibition and criminalization of cannabis by removing it from the Controlled Substances Act and facilitate the expungement of low-level federal cannabis convictions while incentivizing state and local governments to do the same.

In the past, Jeffries called on the New York City Police Commissioner to reform its cannabis arrest policy after reports showed that low-level cannabis arrests, which increased dramatically under Mayor Michael Bloomberg's administration's application of stop-and-frisk, were still rising in New York City under Bloomberg's successor, Bill de Blasio.

=== Healthcare ===
Jeffries co-sponsored Medicare for All legislation between 2013 and 2021, but in August 2026, he said he had shifted his stance and no longer supported or co-sponsored the proposal. Instead, he said, he supports reversing Republican-enacted Medicaid cuts and extending Affordable Care Act tax credits.

=== Trump impeachment ===
Jeffries voted to impeach President Donald Trump during both his first and second impeachments in the House. He repeatedly called Trump's presidency "illegitimate" due to the Russian interference in the 2016 United States presidential election.

=== Foreign affairs ===
==== Russian invasion of Ukraine ====
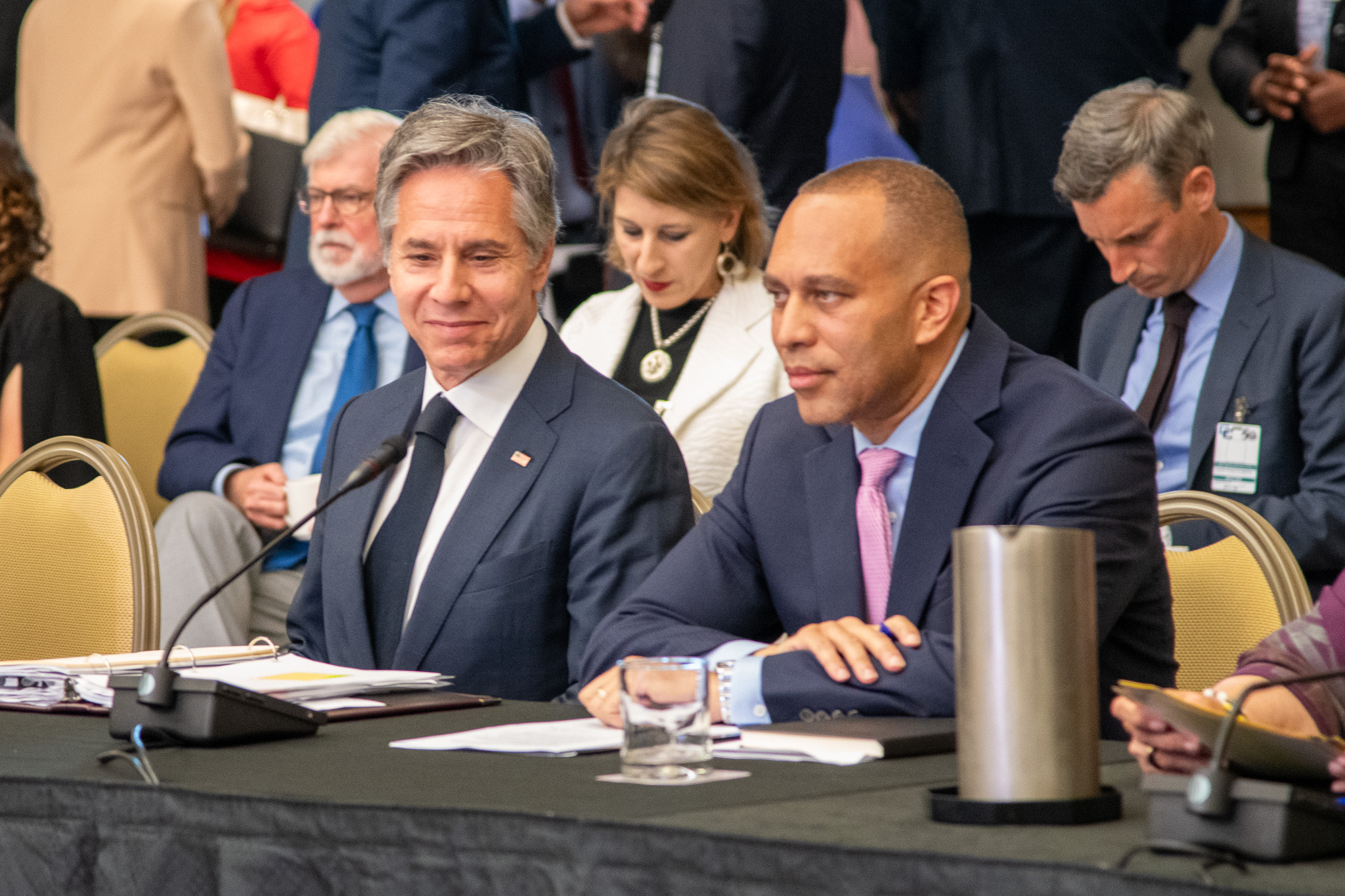
Jeffries with Secretary of State Antony Blinken in July 2023

A member of the bipartisan Congressional Ukraine Caucus, Jeffries has spoken out against Russia's 2022 invasion of Ukraine. He defended the Biden administration's assistance to Ukraine throughout the crisis and voted to send relief. In April 2024, he voted for military aid package supplementals for Ukraine, Israel, and Taiwan.

==== Syria ====
In 2023, Jeffries voted against H.Con.Res. 21, which directed President Joe Biden to remove U.S. troops from Syria within 180 days.

==== Israel ====
Jeffries has been called "one of the most pro-Israel Democrats in the House". Due to his staunch support for Israel, pro-Israel groups cheered Jeffries's ascent to House Democratic leader. At a rally outside the UN during the 2014 Gaza War, Jeffries spoke in support of Israel using an adapted segregationist slogan, saying "Israel today, Israel tomorrow, Israel forever!" Critics compared his remarks to those of George Wallace at his 1963 inaugural address in favor of segregation in the United States. At AIPAC's 2019 policy conference, Jeffries called the Boycott, Divestment and Sanctions movement "inherently antisemitic". In 2020, Jeffries told an AIPAC conference, "back home in New York City we consider Jerusalem to be the sixth borough".

He has visited Israel a total of eight times, most recently in August 2023. On his first trip abroad as House Democratic leader, Jeffries said that House Democrats would "lean in on our strong support" for Israel. In April 2023, he led a delegation of House Democrats on a trip to Israel and met with Prime Minister Benjamin Netanyahu.

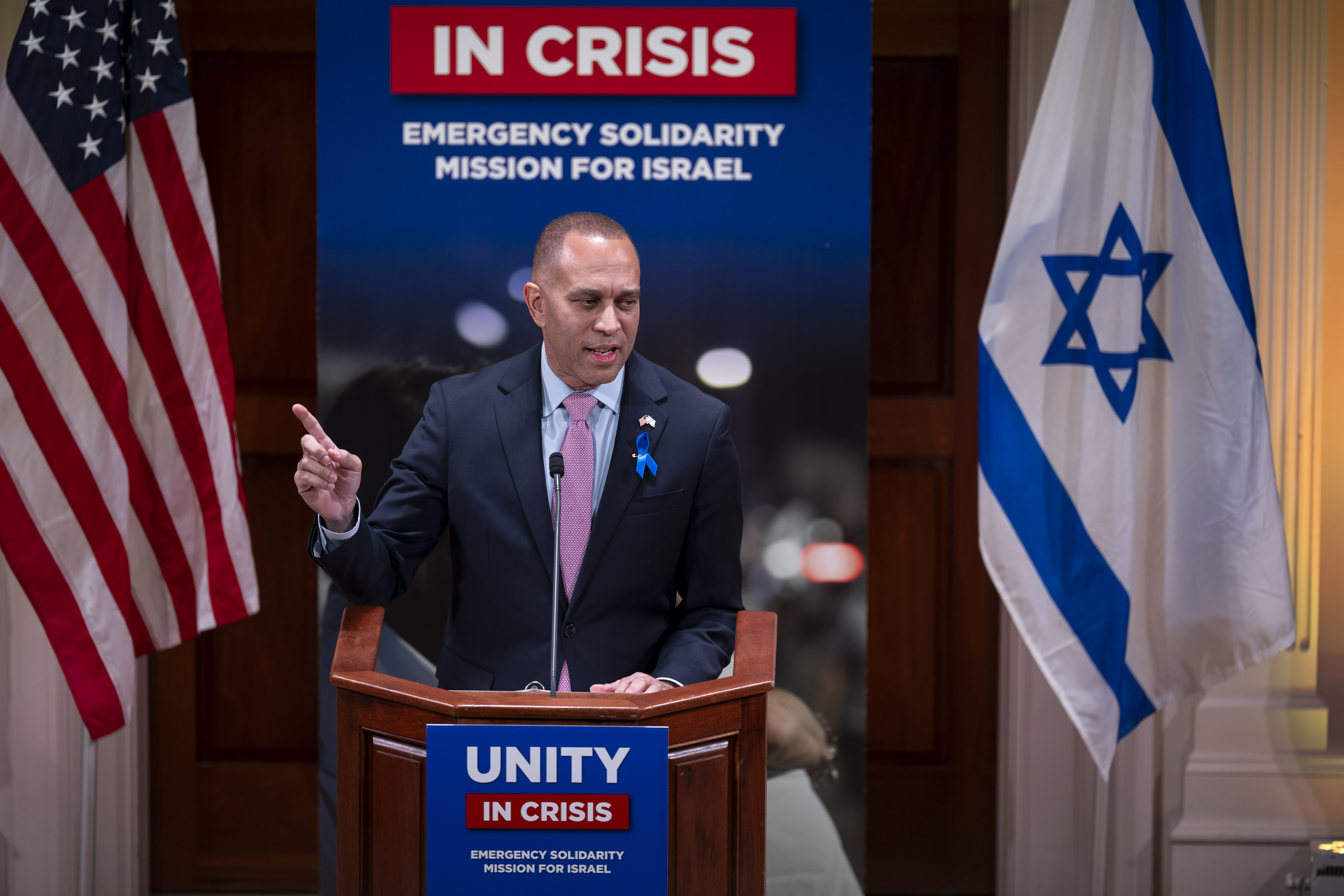
Jeffries at a pro-Israel conference in Washington, D.C., on October 17, 2023

He has been a longtime close ally and financial beneficiary of the American Israel Public Affairs Committee (AIPAC), a pro-Israel lobby group, receiving $1 million in campaign contributions as of 2025. Jeffries accepted the endorsement of liberal Zionist lobby group J Street for the first time in August 2025. Due to his closeness with the pro-Israel lobby, radio host Charlamagne tha God used the nickname "AIPAC Shakur" to describe him. Jeffries in response to this, referred to Charlamagne as "Charlatan the Fraud".

===== Gaza war =====
Upon the onset of the Gaza war, Jeffries reiterated his support for Israel, saying, "Our commitment to Israel's security is ironclad." On November 9, 2023, he rejected calls for a ceasefire. Jeffries spoke at the March for Israel on November 14, 2023, condemning antisemitism and calling for the safe return of all hostages taken captive by Hamas, and a "just and lasting peace". On April 24, 2025, Jeffries met with Israeli Prime Minister Benjamin Netanyahu of Israel amidst the Gaza war.

During consideration of the annual State Department appropriations bill in July 2026, Jeffries opposed Representative Thomas Massie's amendment to eliminate $3.3 billion in U.S. military assistance to Israel. Although he announced he would vote against the amendment, Jeffries said Democratic leadership would not whip the vote, allowing members to vote according to their conscience. The amendment failed by a vote of 104–314, with Jeffries voting against it.

==== Iran ====
Jeffries opposes the 2026 Iran war, which he has called "Donald Trump's reckless and costly war of choice in the Middle East". In an interview, he said: "Donald Trump has plunged us into this reckless conflict without any plan, strategic objectives, or a clear exit strategy. Despite Trump's earlier commitment to steer clear of such confrontations, enormous amounts of money are being spent daily on military operations in the Middle East. Trump has entangled us in a chaotic conflict without explaining his strategy or how this war will serve the interests of Americans. Instead, we have witnessed troubling rises in gas prices, particularly at a time when many people in the United States are facing financial difficulties". Of Trump's stated intention to send ground forces to Iran, Jeffries said: "U.S. ground forces should never be deployed in the Middle East".

In an interview with NPR on November 6, 2026, Jeffries, called for an end to what he termed the "war of choice" with Iran. Jeffries said the conflict had sharply driven up prices for gasoline, diesel, and chemical fertilizers, pushing the cost of food and everyday goods higher for Americans. He argued that the public had clearly demanded an end to the war and that Democrats should not wait for the new Congress to convene before acting. Jeffries also said that Democrats, with majorities in both the House and the Senate, could pass strong resolutions under Congress's war powers authority and force the president to explain to the American people why he vetoed them. Following the 2026 United States elections, Democrats seeking to end the Iran war had the option of leveraging the Congressional power of the purse to this end, prior to their assuming majorities in Congress in 2027. Jeffries did not rule out forcing a government shutdown to end the war, but indicated a preference for passing a war powers resolution instead.

== Elections ==
=== New York State Assembly ===
In 2000, while a lawyer at Paul Weiss, Jeffries challenged incumbent assemblyman Roger L. Green in the Democratic primary. He criticized Green for inattentiveness to his constituents' needs and preoccupation with pursuing higher office after the incumbent had run for New York City Public Advocate in 1997 and had spoken of his plans to run for Congress upon the retirement of Edolphus Towns. Jeffries lost the primary, 59% to 41%, but remained on the Independence Party line in the general election, receiving 7% of the vote to Green's 90%.

During post-census redistricting, Jeffries's home was drawn one block outside of Green's Assembly district as Prospect Heights was removed from the district. Jeffries was still legally permitted to run in the district for the 2002 cycle, as state law requires only that a candidate live in the same county as a district they seek in the first election after a redistricting, but this complicated his path and left Jeffries unable to challenge Green in the 2004 Democratic primary. Green claimed he did not know where Jeffries lived. Jeffries lost the 2002 primary, 52% to 38%. Interviewed later about the redistricting, Jeffries said, "Brooklyn politics can be pretty rough, but that move was gangsta."

The 2002 redistricting left Jeffries unable to challenge Green in the 2004 Democratic primary, which took place after Sheldon Silver and Democratic leadership forced Green to resign after he pleaded guilty to billing the state for false travel expenses. Green was renominated unopposed.

In 2006, Green retired from the Assembly to run for the U.S. House from New York's 10th congressional district against incumbent U.S. representative Ed Towns. Jeffries ran for the 57th district again and won the Democratic primary, defeating Bill Batson and Freddie Hamilton with 64% of the vote. In the general election, he handily defeated Republican nominee Henry Weinstein.

Jeffries was reelected in 2008, defeating Republican nominee Charles Brickhouse with 98% of the vote. In 2010 he was reelected to a third term, easily defeating Republican nominee Frank Voyticky.

=== U.S. House ===
==== 2012 election ====
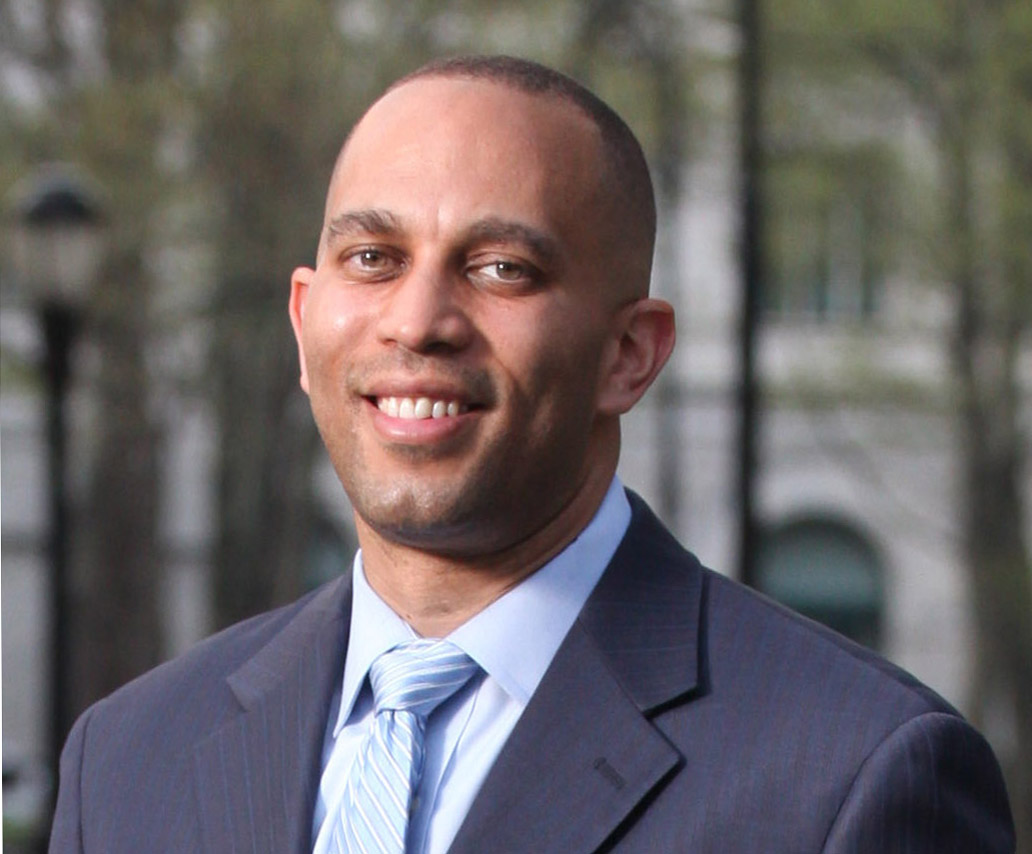
Jeffries during the 112th Congress

In January 2012, Jeffries announced that he would give up his Assembly seat to run for the U.S. House from New York's 8th congressional district.

Jeffries expected to give Towns a strong challenge in the Democratic primary—the real contest in this heavily Democratic, black-majority district. But with Jeffries assembling "a broad coalition of support", Towns announced his retirement on April 16, leaving Jeffries to face city councilman Charles Barron in the Democratic primary.

Jeffries was supported by a broad coalition of local leaders from across the district. On June 11, 2012, former mayor Ed Koch, Congressman Jerry Nadler, Councilman David G. Greenfield, Assemblyman Dov Hikind, and other elected officials and community leaders held a joint event to support Jeffries's campaign.

While President Barack Obama did not openly support candidates in Democratic primaries, he and President Bill Clinton together took a photograph with Jeffries weeks before his 2012 Congressional primary against Charles Barron, which was effectively used in campaign literature.

Jeffries defeated Barron in the June 26 primary election, 72% to 28%. A New York Daily News editorial noted that Barron had been "repudiated" in all parts of the district, including among neighbors on Barron's own block in East New York, which he lost.

New York's 8th congressional district, 2012 Democratic primary
Party	Candidate	Votes	%
Democratic	Hakeem Jeffries	28,271	71.75
Democratic	Charles Barron	11,130	28.25
Total votes		39,401	100.0

In the general election, Jeffries defeated Republican nominee Alan Bellone and Green Party nominee Colin Beavan with 71% of the vote. On January 3, 2013, he was sworn in to the 113th Congress. He has since been reelected six successive times.

New York's 8th congressional district, 2012
Party	Candidate	Votes	%
Democratic	Hakeem Jeffries	178,688	87.50
Working Families	Hakeem Jeffries	5,351	2.62
Total	Hakeem Jeffries	184,039	90.12
Republican	Alan Bellone	15,841	7.76
Conservative	Alan Bellone	1,809	0.89
Total	Alan Bellone	17,650	8.64
Green	Colin Beavan	2,441	1.20
Write-in		77	0.04
Total votes		204,207	100.0
Democratic hold			

==== 2014 election ====
Jeffries was reelected to the House in 2014 without opposition.

New York's 8th congressional district, 2014
Party	Candidate	Votes	%
Democratic	Hakeem Jeffries	70,469	83.89
Working Families	Hakeem Jeffries	6,786	8.09
Total	Hakeem Jeffries (incumbent)	77,255	91.97
Conservative	Alan Bellone	6,673	7.94
Write-in		71	0.08
Total votes		83,999	100.0
Democratic hold			

==== 2016 election ====
In 2016, Jeffries faced no primary challenger. He defeated a Conservative Party challenger with 93% of the vote.

New York's 8th congressional district, 2016
Party	Candidate	Votes	%
Democratic	Hakeem Jeffries	203,235	88.29
Working Families	Hakeem Jeffries	11,360	4.93
Total	Hakeem Jeffries (incumbent)	214,595	93.22
Conservative	Daniel J. Cavanagh	15,401	6.69
Write-in		207	0.09
Total votes		230,203	100.0
Democratic hold			

==== 2018 election ====
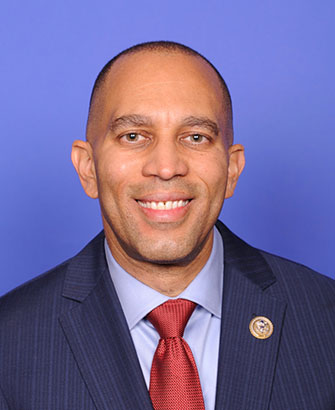
Jeffries during the 115th Congress

In 2018, Jeffries faced no primary challenger. He was reelected with 94% of the vote.

New York's 8th congressional district, 2018
Party	Candidate	Votes	%
Democratic	Hakeem Jeffries	170,850	89.19
Working Families	Hakeem Jeffries	9,526	4.97
Total	Hakeem Jeffries (incumbent)	180,376	94.16
Conservative	Ernest Johnson	9,997	5.22
Reform	Jessica White	1,031	0.54
Write-in		163	0.09
Total votes		191,567	100.0
Democratic hold			

==== 2020 election ====
In 2020, Jeffries faced no primary challenger. He was reelected with 84% of the vote.

New York's 8th congressional district, 2020
Party	Candidate	Votes	%
Democratic	Hakeem Jeffries	207,111	74.72
Working Families	Hakeem Jeffries	27,822	10.04
Total	Hakeem Jeffries (incumbent)	234,933	84.76
Republican	Garfield Wallace	39,124	14.12
Conservative	Garfield Wallace	2,883	1.04
Total	Garfield Wallace	42,007	15.16
Write-in		229	0.08
Total votes		277,169	100.0
Democratic hold			

==== 2022 election ====
In 2022, Jeffries faced no notable primary challenger and was reelected with 71.63% of the vote in the general election.

New York's 8th congressional district, 2022
Party	Candidate	Votes	%
Democratic	Hakeem Jeffries (incumbent)	99,079	71.63
Republican	Yuri Dashevsky	36,776	26.59
Conservative	Yuri Dashevsky	2,284	1.65
Total	Yuri Dashevsky	39,060	28.24
Write-in		191	0.14
Total votes		138,330	100.0

==== 2024 election ====
In 2024, Jeffries faced no primary challenger. He was reelected with 75% of the vote.

New York's 8th congressional district, 2024
Party	Candidate	Votes	%
Democratic	Hakeem Jeffries (incumbent)	168,036	75.08
Republican	John J. Delaney	48,369	21.61
Conservative	John J. Delaney	6,494	2.90
Total	John J. Delaney	54,863	24.51
Write-in		905	0.40
Total votes		223,804	100.0

== Personal life ==
Jeffries is married to Kennisandra Arciniegas-Jeffries, a social worker with 1199 SEIU's Benefit Fund. They have two sons and live in Prospect Heights, Brooklyn.

Jeffries is a Baptist Christian. He is also of Cape Verdean descent; his great-grandfather, Manuel Gomes, emigrated from Cape Verde to New Bedford, Massachusetts, in 1915. In 2013, Jeffries played in the infield on the Democratic team in the Congressional Baseball Game.

Jeffries's younger brother, Hasan Kwame Jeffries, is an associate professor of history at Ohio State University and the author of the 2009 book Bloody Lowndes: Civil Rights and Black Power in Alabama's Black Belt.

Hakeem and Hasan are the nephews of Leonard Jeffries, a former professor at City College of New York.

In the early 1990s, Leonard Jeffries was the subject of controversy surrounding antisemitic statements he had made. As early as 2013, Hakeem Jeffries said he had only "a vague recollection" of the events concerning his uncle and that his father "made a deliberate decision to try to shield" him and his brother from the controversy while they were at college. But in 2023, it emerged that in 1992, Birmingham University's Black Student Union, of which Hakeem Jeffries was then a board member, invited Leonard Jeffries to speak on campus. After pushback from other student groups and calls to cancel the event, Hakeem led a news conference defending his uncle and his speaking engagement. He also wrote an editorial for The Vanguard, the BSU newspaper, criticising Black conservatives, in which he defended both his uncle and Louis Farrakhan. In response to this reporting, a spokesperson for Hakeem Jeffries said, "Leader Jeffries has consistently been clear that he does not share the controversial views espoused by his uncle over thirty years ago."

== See also ==
- List of African-American United States representatives

U.S. House of Representatives
Preceded by Jerrold Nadler	Member of the U.S. House of Representatives from New York's 8th congressional district 2013–present	Incumbent
Preceded by Kevin McCarthy	House Minority Leader; 2023–present	Incumbent
Party political offices
Preceded by Steve Israel	Chair of the Democratic Policy and Communications Committee; 2017–2019; Served alongside: Cheri Bustos, David Cicilline	Succeeded by David Cicilline
Preceded by Joe Crowley	Chair of the House Democratic Caucus; 2019–2023	Succeeded by Pete Aguilar
Preceded by Nancy Pelosi	House Democratic Leader; 2023-present	Incumbent
U.S. order of precedence (ceremonial)
Preceded by Jared Huffman	United States representatives by seniority 106th	Succeeded by David Joyce
Preceded by Steve Scalise as House Majority Leader	Order of precedence of the United States	Succeeded by Tom Emmer as House Majority Whip
