= 2004 United States House of Representatives elections in Colorado =

- November 2, 2004

All 7 Colorado seats to the United States House of Representatives
| | Majority party | Minority party |
|---|---|---|
| Party | Republican | Democratic |
| Last election | 5 seats, 53.90% | 2 seats, 42.19% |
| Seats before | 5 | 2 |
| Seats won | 4 | 3 |
| Seat change | ▼1 | ▲1 |
| Popular vote | 991,835 | 995,283 |
| Percentage | 48.64% | 48.81% |
| Swing | ▼5.26% | ▲6.62% |

Democratic
40–50%
50–60%
60–70%
70–80%
Republican
40–50%
50–60%
60–70%
70–80%

The 2004 congressional elections in Colorado were elections for Colorado's delegation to the United States House of Representatives, which occurred along with congressional elections nationwide on November 2, 2004.

Colorado was one of four states in which the party that won the state's popular vote did not win a majority of seats in 2004, the other states being Connecticut, New Mexico, and Tennessee.

== Overview ==
=== Statewide ===
| Party | Candidates | Votes | | Seats | | |
| Party | Candidates | No. | % | No. | +/– | % |
|---|---|---|---|---|---|---|
| Democratic | 7 | 995,283 | 48.81 | 3 | ▲1 | 42.86 |
| Republican | 7 | 991,835 | 48.64 | 4 | ▼1 | 57.14 |
| Libertarian | 3 | 17,788 | 0.87 | 0 | Steady | 0.0 |
| Green | 1 | 12,739 | 0.62 | 0 | Steady | 0.0 |
| Constitution | 3 | 12,596 | 0.62 | 0 | Steady | 0.0 |
| Others | 1 | 8,770 | 0.43 | 0 | Steady | 0.0 |
| Total | 18 | 2,039,011 | 100.0 | 7 | Steady | 100.0 |

Popular vote
| Democratic | 48.81% |
| Republican | 48.64% |
| Libertarian | 0.87% |
| Other | 1.68% |

House seats
| Republican | 57.14% |
| Democratic | 42.86% |

=== By district ===
Results of the 2004 United States House of Representatives elections in Colorado by district:

| District | Democratic | | Republican | | Others | | Total | | Result |
| District | Votes | % | Votes | % | Votes | % | Votes | % | Result |
|---|---|---|---|---|---|---|---|---|---|
| District 1 | 177,077 | 73.50% | 58,659 | 24.35% | 5,193 | 2.16% | 240,929 | 100.0% | Democratic hold |
| District 2 | 207,900 | 67.20% | 94,160 | 30.44% | 7,304 | 2.36% | 309,364 | 100.0% | Democratic hold |
| District 3 | 153,500 | 50.55% | 141,376 | 46.56% | 8,770 | 2.89% | 303,646 | 100.0% | Democratic gain |
| District 4 | 136,812 | 44.78% | 155,958 | 51.05% | 12,739 | 4.17% | 305,509 | 100.0% | Republican hold |
| District 5 | 74,098 | 27.04% | 193,333 | 70.54% | 6,627 | 2.42% | 274,058 | 100.0% | Republican hold |
| District 6 | 139,870 | 39.10% | 212,778 | 59.48% | 5,093 | 1.42% | 357,741 | 100.0% | Republican hold |
| District 7 | 106,026 | 42.79% | 135,571 | 54.72% | 6,167 | 2.49% | 247,764 | 100.0% | Republican hold |
| Total | 995,283 | 48.81% | 991,835 | 48.64% | 51,893 | 2.55% | 2,039,011 | 100.0% | |

== District 1 ==
2004 Colorado's 1st congressional district election
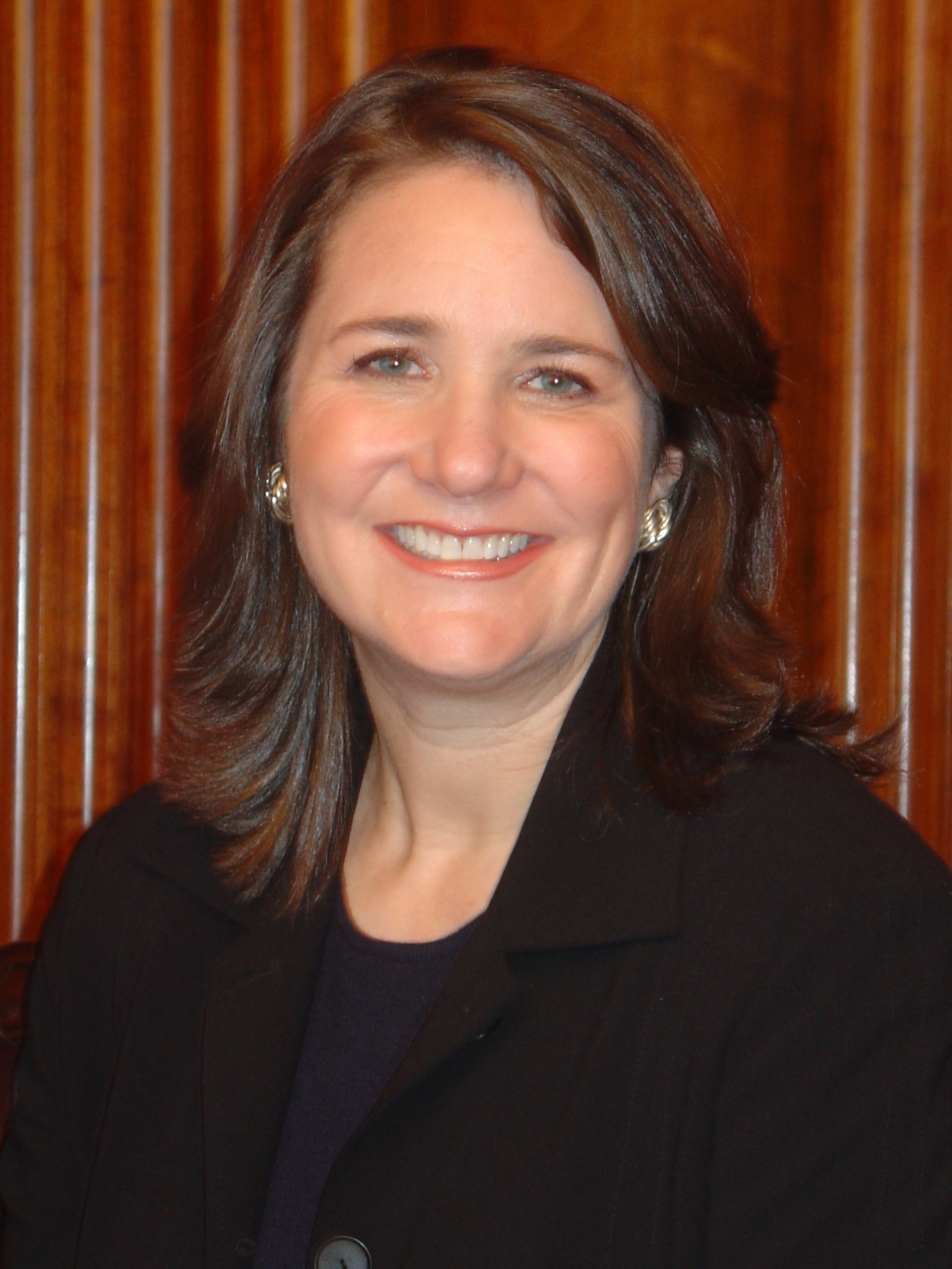

| Nominee | Diana DeGette | Roland Chicas |
| Party | Democratic | Republican |
| Popular vote | 177,077 | 58,659 |
| Percentage | 73.5% | 24.3% |
- County results Degette: 60–70% 70–80% Chicas: 100–110%
U.S. Representative before election
Diana DeGette
Democratic
Elected U.S. Representative
Diana DeGette
Democratic

Incumbent Democrat Diana DeGette, who had represented the district since 1997, ran for re-election. She was re-elected with 66.3% of the vote in 2002.

=== Democratic primary ===
==== Candidates ====
===== Nominee =====
- Diana DeGette, incumbent U.S. Representative

==== Results ====
Democratic primary results
| Party | Candidate | Votes | % |
|---|---|---|---|
| Democratic | Diana DeGette (incumbent) | 47,579 | 100.0 |
| Total votes | | 47,579 | 100.0 |

=== Republican primary ===
==== Candidates ====
===== Nominee =====
- Roland Chicas, consultant

==== Results ====
Republican primary results
| Party | Candidate | Votes | % |
|---|---|---|---|
| Republican | Roland Chicas | 16,417 | 100.0 |
| Total votes | | 16,417 | 100.0 |

=== Constitution primary ===
==== Candidates ====
===== Nominee =====
- George Lilly, sales and marketing representative, nominee for state representative in 2000 and for this seat in 2002

=== General election ===
==== Endorsements ====
Diana DeGette (D)

Newspapers

- The Denver Post

==== Predictions ====
| Source | Ranking | As of |
|---|---|---|
| The Cook Political Report | Safe D | October 29, 2004 |
| Sabato's Crystal Ball | Safe D | November 1, 2004 |

==== Results ====
Colorado's 1st congressional district election, 2004
| Party | Candidate | Votes | % |
|---|---|---|---|
| Democratic | Diana DeGette (incumbent) | 177,077 | 73.5 |
| Republican | Roland Chicas | 58,659 | 24.3 |
| American Constitution | George Lilly | 5,193 | 2.2 |
| Majority | | 118,418 | 49.2 |
| Total votes | | 240,929 | 100.0 |
| Democratic hold | | | |

==== Finances ====
===== Campaigns =====
| Candidate (party) | Raised | Spent | Cash on hand |
|---|---|---|---|
| Diana DeGette (D) | $632,594 | $620,599 | $230,584 |
| Roland Chicas (R) | $17,034 | $16,968 | $0 |
| George Lilly (C) | Unreported | | |

===== Outside Spending =====
| Candidate (party) | Supported | Opposed |
|---|---|---|
| Diana DeGette (D) | $178 | $0 |
| Roland Chicas (R) | $0 | $0 |
| George Lilly (C) | $0 | $0 |

== District 2 ==
2004 Colorado's 2nd congressional district election
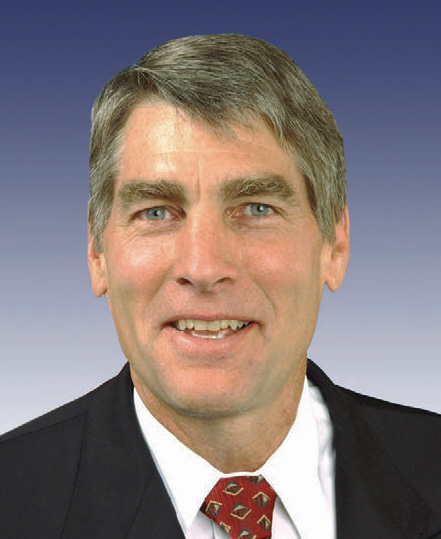

| Nominee | Mark Udall | Stephen Hackman |
| Party | Democratic | Republican |
| Popular vote | 207,900 | 94,160 |
| Percentage | 67.2% | 30.4% |
- County results Udall: 50–60% 60–70% 70–80%
U.S. Representative before election
Mark Udall
Democratic
Elected U.S. Representative
Mark Udall
Democratic

Incumbent Democrat Mark Udall, who had represented the district since 1999, ran for re-election. He was re-elected with 60.1% of the vote in 2002.

=== Democratic primary ===
==== Candidates ====
===== Nominee =====
- Mark Udall, incumbent U.S. Representative

==== Results ====
Democratic primary results
| Party | Candidate | Votes | % |
|---|---|---|---|
| Democratic | Mark Udall (incumbent) | 32,679 | 100.0 |
| Total votes | | 32,679 | 100.0 |

=== Republican primary ===
==== Candidates ====
===== Nominee =====
- Stephen Hackman, lay minister

===== Eliminated in primary =====
- Michael Kennedy, retired economist

==== Results ====
Republican primary results
| Party | Candidate | Votes | % |
|---|---|---|---|
| Republican | Stephen Hackman | 12,538 | 52.1 |
| Republican | Michael Kennedy | 11,518 | 47.9 |
| Total votes | | 24,056 | 100.0 |

=== Libertarian primary ===
==== Candidates ====
===== Nominee =====
- Norm Olsen, software developer, nominee for state representative in 2000 and for this seat in 2002

=== General election ===
==== Endorsements ====
Mark Udall (D)

Newspapers

- The Denver Post

==== Predictions ====
| Source | Ranking | As of |
|---|---|---|
| The Cook Political Report | Safe D | October 29, 2004 |
| Sabato's Crystal Ball | Safe D | November 1, 2004 |

==== Results ====
Colorado's 2nd congressional district election, 2004
| Party | Candidate | Votes | % |
|---|---|---|---|
| Democratic | Mark Udall (incumbent) | 207,900 | 67.2 |
| Republican | Stephen Hackman | 94,160 | 30.4 |
| Libertarian | Norm Olsen | 7,304 | 2.4 |
| Majority | | 113,740 | 36.8 |
| Total votes | | 309,364 | 100.0 |
| Democratic hold | | | |

==== Finances ====
===== Campaigns =====
| Candidate (party) | Raised | Spent | Cash on hand |
|---|---|---|---|
| Mark Udall (D) | $1,122,459 | $885,440 | $703,974 |
| Stephen Hackman (R) | $8,374 | $10,262 | $0 |
| Norm Olsen (L) | $2,000 | $181 | $1,818 |

===== Outside Spending =====
| Candidate (party) | Supported | Opposed |
|---|---|---|
| Mark Udall (D) | $48 | $0 |
| Stephen Hackman (R) | $0 | $0 |
| Norm Olsen (L) | $0 | $0 |

== District 3 ==
2004 Colorado's 3rd congressional district election
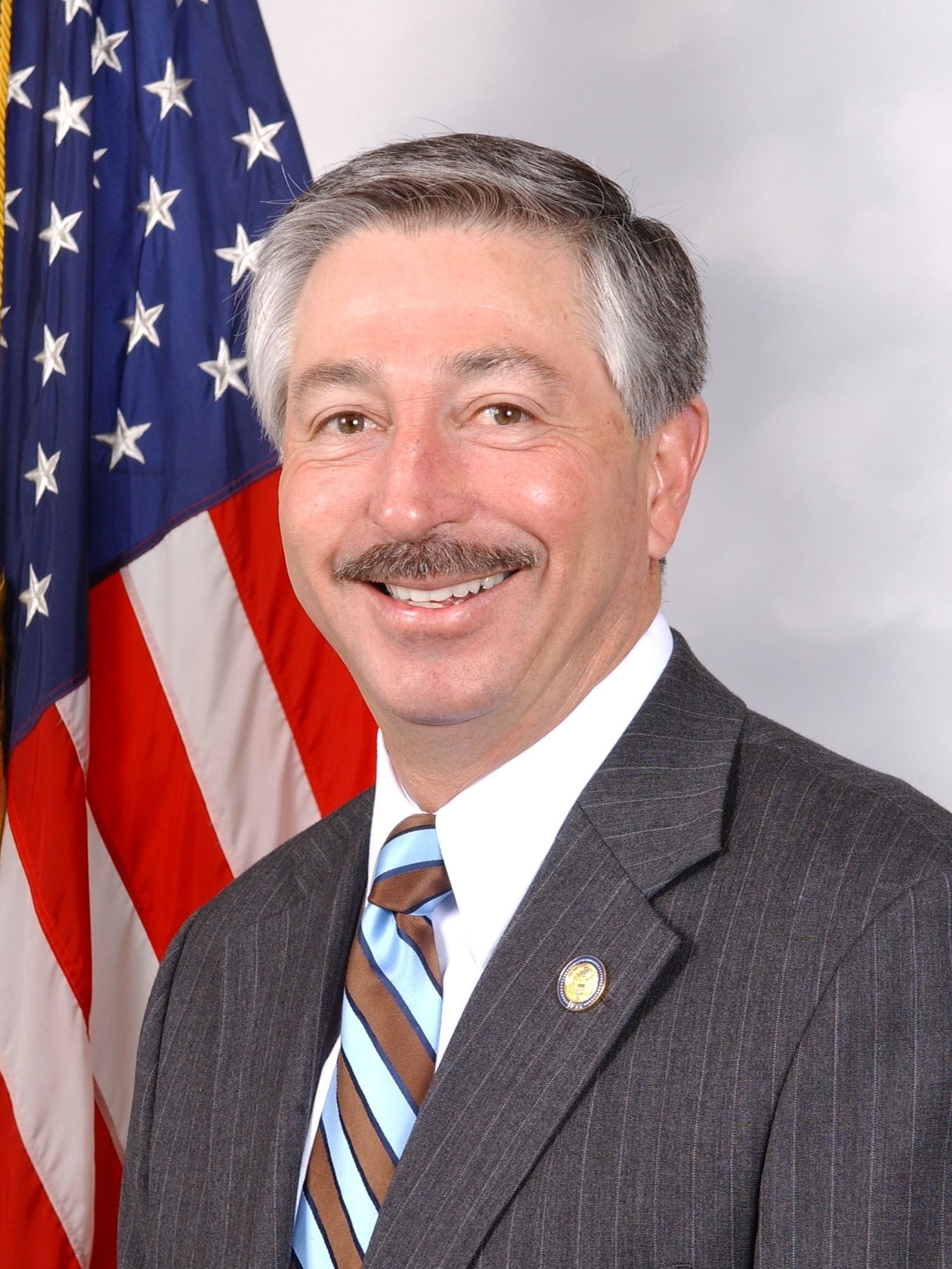

| Nominee | John Salazar | Greg Walcher |
| Party | Democratic | Republican |
| Popular vote | 153,500 | 141,376 |
| Percentage | 50.6% | 46.6% |
- County results Salazar: 50–60% 60–70% 70–80% Walcher: 40–50% 50–60% 60–70% 70–80%
U.S. Representative before election
Scott McInnis
Republican
Elected U.S. Representative
John Salazar
Democratic

Incumbent Republican Scott McInnis, who had represented the district since 1993, retired rather than run for re-election. He was re-elected with 65.8% of the vote in 2002. The 3rd and 7th were targeted by the Republican controlled state legislature for a controversial mid decade redistricting. The Colorado Supreme Court overturned the gerrymandered map and the U.S. Supreme Court declined to hear an appeal, ensuring that the existing map would continue to be used until 2012.

=== Republican primary ===
==== Candidates ====
===== Nominee =====
- Greg Walcher, former Executive Director of the Department of Natural Resources

===== Eliminated in primary =====
- Matt Aljanich, pilot
- Dan Corsentino, Pueblo County Sheriff
- Gregg Rippy, state representative
- Matt Smith, state representative and brother-in-law of Representative McInnis

===== Withdrawn =====
- Ken Chlouber, state senator and nominee for the 1st District in 2002
- Delena DiSanto, realtor and activist
- Doug Sitter, attorney

===== Declined =====
- Russ George, director of the Division of Wildlife
- Scott McInnis, incumbent U.S. Representative
- Lola Spradley, Speaker of the State House
- Jack Taylor, state senator
- Ron Teck, state senator
- Scott Tipton, businessman

==== Results ====
Republican primary results
| Party | Candidate | Votes | % |
|---|---|---|---|
| Republican | Greg Walcher | 15,572 | 31.9 |
| Republican | Matt Smith | 15,298 | 31.3 |
| Republican | Gregg Rippy | 7,968 | 16.3 |
| Republican | Dan Corsentino | 5,612 | 11.5 |
| Republican | Matt Aljanich | 4,408 | 9.0 |
| Total votes | | 48,858 | 100.0 |

=== Democratic primary ===
==== Candidates ====
===== Nominee =====
- John Salazar, state representative

===== Withdrawn =====
- Randy Fricke, auto salesman
- Jim Fritz, homeless man
- Anthony Martinez, Air Force Reserve Major and nominee for Secretary of State in 2000 and 2002
- Jim Spehar, Mayor of Grand Junction

===== Declined =====
- Bernie Buescher, former Executive Director of the Department of Health Care Policy and Financing and nominee for Lieutenant Governor in 1998
- Jim Isgar, state senator
- Bill Thiebaut, former state senator and nominee for Lieutenant Governor in 2002

==== Results ====
Democratic primary results
| Party | Candidate | Votes | % |
|---|---|---|---|
| Democratic | John Salazar | 34,464 | 100.0 |
| Total votes | | 34,464 | 100.0 |

=== General election ===
==== Endorsements ====
John Salazar (D)

Organizations

- Democratic Congressional Campaign Committee "Red to Blue" Program

Newspapers

- The Denver Post

==== Predictions ====
| Source | Ranking | As of |
|---|---|---|
| The Cook Political Report | Tossup | October 29, 2004 |
| Sabato's Crystal Ball | Lean D (flip) | November 1, 2004 |

==== Results ====
Colorado's 3rd congressional district election, 2004
| Party | Candidate | Votes | % |
|---|---|---|---|
| Democratic | John Salazar | 153,500 | 50.6 |
| Republican | Greg Walcher | 141,376 | 46.6 |
| Independent | Jim Krug | 8,770 | 2.9 |
| Majority | | 12,124 | 4.0 |
| Total votes | | 303,646 | 100.0 |
| Democratic gain from Republican | | | |

==== Finances ====
===== Campaigns =====
| Candidate (party) | Raised | Spent | Cash on hand |
|---|---|---|---|
| Greg Walcher (R) | $1,638,304 | $1,562,081 | $76,222 |
| John Salazar (D) | $1,661,486 | $1,625,022 | $36,463 |
| Jim Krug (I) | Unreported | | |

===== Outside Spending =====
| Candidate (party) | Supported | Opposed |
|---|---|---|
| Greg Walcher (R) | $1,570,326 | $136,227 |
| John Salazar (D) | $1,793,044 | $2,138,778 |
| Jim Krug (I) | $0 | $0 |

== District 4 ==
2004 Colorado's 4th congressional district election
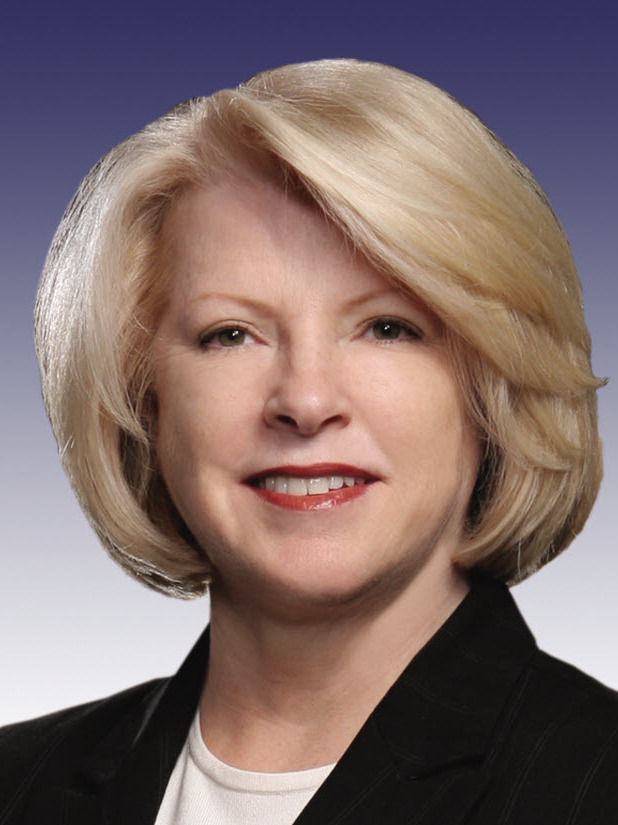

| Nominee | Marilyn Musgrave | Stan Matsunaka |
| Party | Republican | Democratic |
| Popular vote | 155,958 | 136,812 |
| Percentage | 51.0% | 44.8% |
- County results Musgrave: 50–60% 60–70% 70–80% Matsunaka: 40–50%
U.S. Representative before election
Marilyn Musgrave
Republican
Elected U.S. Representative
Marilyn Musgrave
Republican

Incumbent Republican Marilyn Musgrave, who had represented the district since 2003, ran for re-election. She was elected with 54.9% of the vote in 2002.

=== Republican primary ===
==== Candidates ====
===== Nominee =====
- Marilyn Musgrave, incumbent U.S. Representative

===== Eliminated in primary =====
- Bob Faust, mechanical engineering consultant

==== Results ====
Republican primary results
| Party | Candidate | Votes | % |
|---|---|---|---|
| Republican | Marilyn Musgrave (incumbent) | 44,649 | 78.1 |
| Republican | Bob Faust | 12,553 | 21.9 |
| Total votes | | 57,202 | 100.0 |

=== Democratic primary ===
==== Candidates ====
===== Nominee =====
- Stan Matsunaka, former President of the Colorado Senate and nominee for this seat in 2002

==== Results ====
Democratic primary results
| Party | Candidate | Votes | % |
|---|---|---|---|
| Democratic | Stan Matsunaka | 24,894 | 100.0 |
| Total votes | | 24,894 | 100.0 |

=== Green primary ===
==== Candidates ====
===== Nominee =====
- Bob Kinsey, retired history and social studies teacher

=== General election ===
==== Endorsements ====
Stan Matsunaka (D)

Newspapers

- The Denver Post

==== Predictions ====
| Source | Ranking | As of |
|---|---|---|
| The Cook Political Report | Likely R | October 29, 2004 |
| Sabato's Crystal Ball | Safe R | November 1, 2004 |

==== Results ====
Colorado's 4th congressional district election, 2004
| Party | Candidate | Votes | % |
|---|---|---|---|
| Republican | Marilyn Musgrave (incumbent) | 155,958 | 51.0 |
| Democratic | Stan Matsunaka | 136,812 | 44.8 |
| Green | Bob Kinsey | 12,739 | 4.2 |
| Majority | | 19,146 | 6.3 |
| Total votes | | 305,509 | 100.0 |
| Republican hold | | | |

==== Finances ====
===== Campaigns =====
| Candidate (party) | Raised | Spent | Cash on hand |
|---|---|---|---|
| Marilyn Musgrave (R) | $3,422,482 | $3,314,507 | $120,513 |
| Stan Matsunaka (D) | $869,007 | $868,439 | $551 |
| Bob Kinsey (G) | $6,947 | $6,946 | $0 |

===== Outside Spending =====
| Candidate (party) | Supported | Opposed |
|---|---|---|
| Marilyn Musgrave (R) | $78,771 | $0 |
| Stan Matsunaka (D) | $5,000 | $908,299 |
| Bob Kinsey (G) | $0 | $0 |

== District 5 ==
2004 Colorado's 5th congressional district election
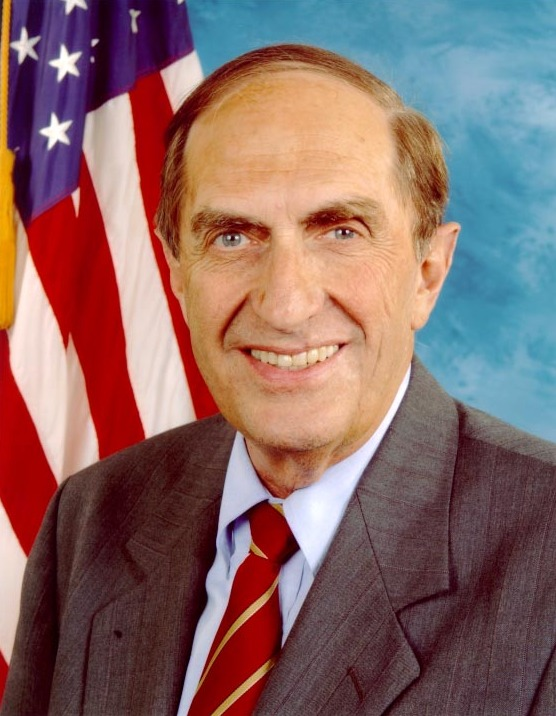

| Nominee | Joel Hefley | Fred Hardee |
| Party | Republican | Democratic |
| Popular vote | 193,333 | 74,098 |
| Percentage | 70.5% | 27.0% |
- County results Hefley: 60–70% 70–80% Hardee: 40–50%
U.S. Representative before election
Joel Hefley
Republican
Elected U.S. Representative
Joel Hefley
Republican

Incumbent Republican Joel Hefley, who had represented the district since 1987, ran for re-election. He was re-elected with 69.4% of the vote in 2002.

=== Republican primary ===
==== Candidates ====
===== Nominee =====
- Joel Hefley, incumbent U.S. Representative

===== Eliminated in primary =====
- Mike Payton, contractor

==== Results ====
Republican primary results
| Party | Candidate | Votes | % |
|---|---|---|---|
| Republican | Joel Hefley (incumbent) | 52,282 | 84.2 |
| Republican | Mike Payton | 9,785 | 15.8 |
| Total votes | | 62,067 | 100.0 |

=== Democratic primary ===
==== Candidates ====
===== Nominee =====
- Fred Hardee, businessman and former chair of the El Paso County Democratic Party

==== Results ====
Democratic primary results
| Party | Candidate | Votes | % |
|---|---|---|---|
| Democratic | Fred Hardee | 15,763 | 100.0 |
| Total votes | | 15,763 | 100.0 |

=== Libertarian primary ===
==== Candidates ====
===== Nominee =====
- Arthur "Rob" Roberts, former U.S. Air Force computer programmer

=== General election ===
==== Endorsements ====
Joel Hefley (R)

Newspapers

- The Denver Post

==== Predictions ====
| Source | Ranking | As of |
|---|---|---|
| The Cook Political Report | Safe R | October 29, 2004 |
| Sabato's Crystal Ball | Safe R | November 1, 2004 |

==== Results ====
Colorado's 5th congressional district election, 2004
| Party | Candidate | Votes | % |
|---|---|---|---|
| Republican | Joel Hefley (incumbent) | 193,333 | 70.5 |
| Democratic | Fred Hardee | 74,098 | 27.0 |
| Libertarian | Arthur "Rob" Roberts | 6,627 | 2.4 |
| Majority | | 119,235 | 43.5 |
| Total votes | | 274,058 | 100.0 |
| Republican hold | | | |

==== Finances ====
===== Campaigns =====
| Candidate (party) | Raised | Spent | Cash on hand |
|---|---|---|---|
| Joel Hefley (R) | $100,276 | $93,332 | $95,122 |
| Fred Hardee (D) | $11,130 | $8,949 | $1,635 |
| Arthur Roberts (L) | Unreported | | |

===== Outside Spending =====
| Candidate (party) | Supported | Opposed |
|---|---|---|
| Joel Hefley (R) | $582 | $0 |
| Fred Hardee (D) | $0 | $0 |
| Arthur Roberts (L) | $0 | $0 |

== District 6 ==
2004 Colorado's 6th congressional district election
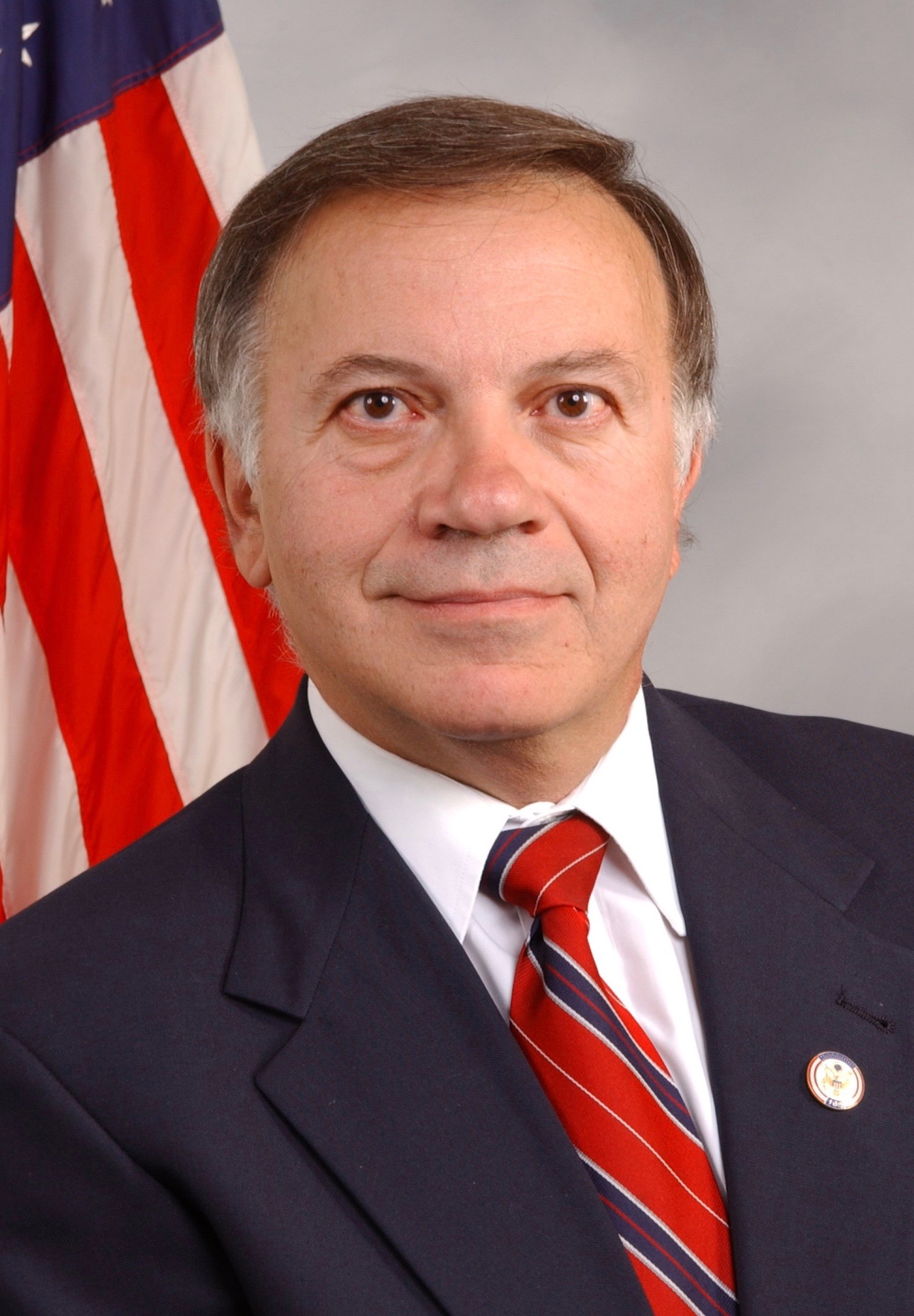

| Nominee | Tom Tancredo | Joanna Conti |
| Party | Republican | Democratic |
| Popular vote | 212,778 | 139,870 |
| Percentage | 59.5% | 39.1% |
- County results Tancredo: 50–60% 60–70% 70–80%
U.S. Representative before election
Tom Tancredo
Republican
Elected U.S. Representative
Tom Tancredo
Republican

Incumbent Republican Tom Tancredo, who had represented the district since 1999, ran for re-election. He was re-elected with 66.9% of the vote in 2002.

=== Republican primary ===
Tancredo had previously pledged to only serve three terms in office, leading to speculation that party leaders might attempt to recruit a top-tier challenger to him.

==== Candidates ====
===== Nominee =====
- Tom Tancredo, incumbent U.S. Representative

===== Declined =====
- John Andrews, President of the Colorado Senate and nominee for Governor in 1990
- Mike Coffman, State Treasurer
- Rick O'Donnell, director of Governor Bill Owens' policy and initiatives office and candidate for the 7th district in 2002

==== Results ====
Republican primary results
| Party | Candidate | Votes | % |
|---|---|---|---|
| Republican | Tom Tancredo (incumbent) | 58,446 | 100.0 |
| Total votes | | 58,446 | 100.0 |

=== Democratic primary ===
==== Candidates ====
===== Nominee =====
- Joanna Conti, businesswoman

==== Results ====
Democratic primary results
| Party | Candidate | Votes | % |
|---|---|---|---|
| Democratic | Joanna Conti | 23,111 | 100.0 |
| Total votes | | 23,111 | 100.0 |

=== Libertarian primary ===
==== Candidates ====
===== Nominee =====
- Jack Woehr, computer programmer and Democratic candidate for this seat in 1994

=== Constitution primary ===
==== Candidates ====
===== Nominee =====
- Peter Shevchuck

=== General election ===
==== Endorsements ====
Joanna Conti (D)

Newspapers

- The Denver Post

==== Predictions ====
| Source | Ranking | As of |
|---|---|---|
| The Cook Political Report | Safe R | October 29, 2004 |
| Sabato's Crystal Ball | Safe R | November 1, 2004 |

==== Results ====
Colorado's 6th congressional district election, 2004
| Party | Candidate | Votes | % |
|---|---|---|---|
| Republican | Tom Tancredo (incumbent) | 212,778 | 59.5 |
| Democratic | Joanna Conti | 139,870 | 39.1 |
| Libertarian | Jack J. Woehr | 3,857 | 1.1 |
| American Constitution | Peter Shevchuck | 1,235 | 0.3 |
| Majority | | 72,908 | 20.4 |
| Total votes | | 357,741 | 100.0 |
| Republican hold | | | |

==== Finances ====
===== Campaigns =====
| Candidate (party) | Raised | Spent | Cash on hand |
|---|---|---|---|
| Tom Tancredo (R) | $982,522 | $1,178,724 | $161,352 |
| Joanna Conti (D) | $827,697 | $827,526 | $171 |
| Jack Woehr (L) | Unreported | | |
| Peter Shevchuck (C) | Unreported | | |

===== Outside Spending =====
| Candidate (party) | Supported | Opposed |
|---|---|---|
| Tom Tancredo (R) | $473 | $0 |
| Joanna Conti (D) | $0 | $0 |
| Jack Woehr (L) | $0 | $0 |
| Peter Shevchuck (C) | $0 | $0 |

== District 7 ==
2004 Colorado's 7th congressional district election
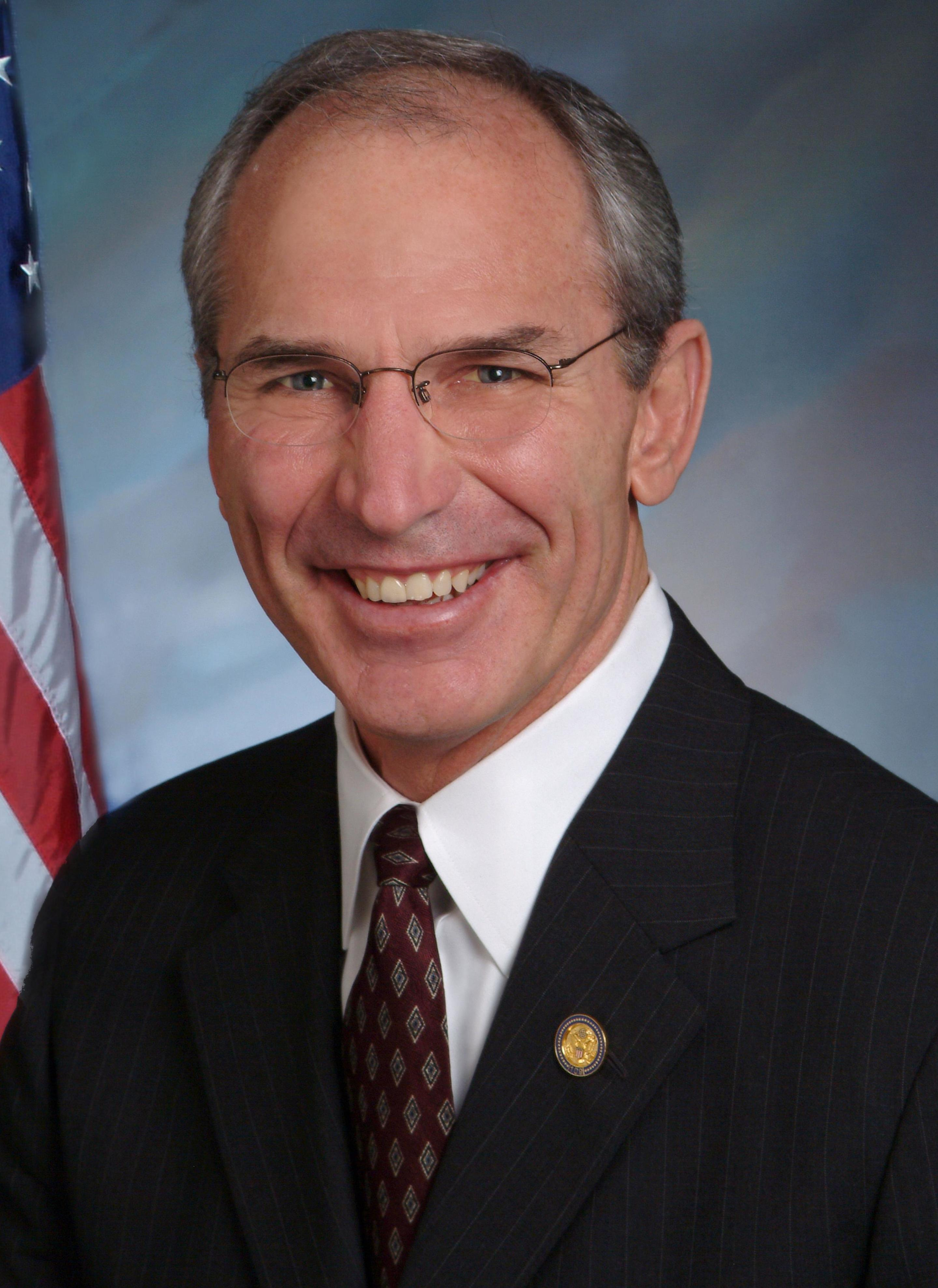

| Nominee | Bob Beauprez | Dave Thomas |
| Party | Republican | Democratic |
| Popular vote | 135,571 | 106,026 |
| Percentage | 55.7% | 42.8% |
- County results Beauprez: 50–60%
U.S. Representative before election
Bob Beauprez
Republican
Elected U.S. Representative
Bob Beauprez
Republican

Incumbent Republican Bob Beauprez, who had represented the district since 2003, ran for re-election. He was elected with 47.3% of the vote in 2002.

=== Republican primary ===
==== Candidates ====
===== Nominee =====
- Bob Beauprez, incumbent U.S. Representative

==== Results ====
Republican primary results
| Party | Candidate | Votes | % |
|---|---|---|---|
| Republican | Bob Beauprez (incumbent) | 34,729 | 100.0 |
| Total votes | | 34,729 | 100.0 |

=== Democratic primary ===
==== Candidates ====
===== Nominee =====
- Dave Thomas, Jefferson County District Attorney, candidate for the District 2 in 1998 and for this seat in 2002

===== Withdrawn =====
- John Works, businessman

===== Declined =====
- Mike Feeley, former State Senate Minority Leader, candidate for Governor in 1998 and nominee for this seat in 2002
- Joan Fitz-Gerald, State Senate Minority Leader
- Michael Garcia, state representative
- Ed Perlmutter, former state senator
- Jared Polis, Colorado Board of Education President

==== Results ====
Democratic primary results
| Party | Candidate | Votes | % |
|---|---|---|---|
| Democratic | Dave Thomas | 27,706 | 100.0 |
| Total votes | | 27,706 | 100.0 |

=== Constitution primary ===
==== Candidates ====
===== Nominee =====
- Clyde Harkins, former program specialist for Department of Health and Human Services

=== General election ===
==== Endorsements ====
Bob Beauprez (R)

Newspapers

- The Denver Post
Dave Thomas (D)

Organizations

- Democratic Congressional Campaign Committee "Red to Blue" Program

==== Predictions ====
| Source | Ranking | As of |
|---|---|---|
| The Cook Political Report | Lean R | October 29, 2004 |
| Sabato's Crystal Ball | Lean R | November 1, 2004 |

==== Results ====
Colorado's 7th congressional district election, 2004
| Party | Candidate | Votes | % |
|---|---|---|---|
| Republican | Bob Beauprez (incumbent) | 135,571 | 55.7 |
| Democratic | Dave Thomas | 106,026 | 42.8 |
| American Constitution | Clyde Harkins | 6,167 | 2.5 |
| Majority | | 29,545 | 11.9 |
| Total votes | | 247,764 | 100.0 |
| Republican hold | | | |

==== Finances ====
===== Campaigns =====
| Candidate (party) | Raised | Spent | Cash on hand |
|---|---|---|---|
| Bob Beauprez (R) | $2,967,373 | $2,896,799 | $19,497 |
| Dave Thomas (D) | $1,156,413 | $1,106,087 | $51,507 |
| Clyde Harkins (C) | Unreported | | |

===== Outside Spending =====
| Candidate (party) | Supported | Opposed |
|---|---|---|
| Bob Beauprez (R) | $134,592 | $1,362 |
| Dave Thomas (D) | $90,218 | $487,860 |
| Clyde Harkins (C) | $0 | $0 |
