= 2006 United States House of Representatives elections in Colorado =

- November 7, 2006

All 7 Colorado seats to the United States House of Representatives
| | Majority party | Minority party |
|---|---|---|
| Party | Democratic | Republican |
| Last election | 3 seats, 48.81% | 4 seats, 48.64% |
| Seats before | 3 | 4 |
| Seats won | 4 | 3 |
| Seat change | ▲1 | ▼1 |
| Popular vote | 832,888 | 623,784 |
| Percentage | 54.12% | 40.53% |
| Swing | ▲5.31% | ▼8.11% |

Democratic
40–50%
50–60%
60–70%
70–80%
80–90%
Republican
40–50%
50–60%
60–70%
70–80%

The 2006 congressional elections in Colorado were elections for Colorado's delegation to the United States House of Representatives, which occurred along with congressional elections nationwide on November 7, 2006.

== Overview ==
=== Statewide ===
| Party | Candidates | Votes | | Seats | | |
| Party | Candidates | No. | % | No. | +/– | % |
|---|---|---|---|---|---|---|
| Democratic | 7 | 832,888 | 54.12 | 4 | ▲1 | 57.14 |
| Republican | 6 | 623,784 | 40.53 | 3 | ▼1 | 42.86 |
| Green | 4 | 38,872 | 2.53 | 0 | Steady | 0.0 |
| Reform | 1 | 27,133 | 1.76 | 0 | Steady | 0.0 |
| Libertarian | 3 | 13,535 | 0.88 | 0 | Steady | 0.0 |
| Constitution | 1 | 2,605 | 0.17 | 0 | Steady | 0.0 |
| Write-in | 3 | 91 | 0.0 | 0 | Steady | 0.0 |
| Total | 25 | 1,538,908 | 100.0 | 7 | Steady | 100.0 |

Popular vote
| Democratic | 54.12% |
| Republican | 40.53% |
| Green | 2.52% |
| Other | 2.82% |

House seats
| Democratic | 57.14% |
| Republican | 42.86% |

=== By district ===
Results of the 2006 United States House of Representatives elections in Colorado by district:

| District | Democratic | | Republican | | Others | | Total | | Result |
| District | Votes | % | Votes | % | Votes | % | Votes | % | Result |
|---|---|---|---|---|---|---|---|---|---|
| District 1 | 129,446 | 79.77% | 0 | 0.00% | 32,825 | 20.23% | 162,271 | 100.0% | Democratic hold |
| District 2 | 157,850 | 68.24% | 65,481 | 28.31% | 7,976 | 3.45% | 231,307 | 100.0% | Democratic hold |
| District 3 | 146,488 | 61.59% | 86,930 | 36.55% | 4,440 | 1.87% | 237,858 | 100.0% | Democratic hold |
| District 4 | 103,748 | 43.12% | 109,732 | 45.61% | 27,133 | 11.28% | 240,613 | 100.0% | Republican hold |
| District 5 | 83,431 | 40.35% | 123,264 | 59.62% | 61 | 0.03% | 206,756 | 100.0% | Republican hold |
| District 6 | 108,007 | 39.87% | 158,806 | 58.61% | 4,118 | 1.52% | 270,931 | 100.0% | Republican hold |
| District 7 | 103,918 | 54.93% | 79,571 | 42.06% | 5,683 | 3.00% | 189,172 | 100.0% | Democratic Gain |
| Total | 832,888 | 54.12% | 623,784 | 40.53% | 82,236 | 5.34% | 1,538,908 | 100.0% | |

== District 1 ==
2006 Colorado's 1st congressional district election
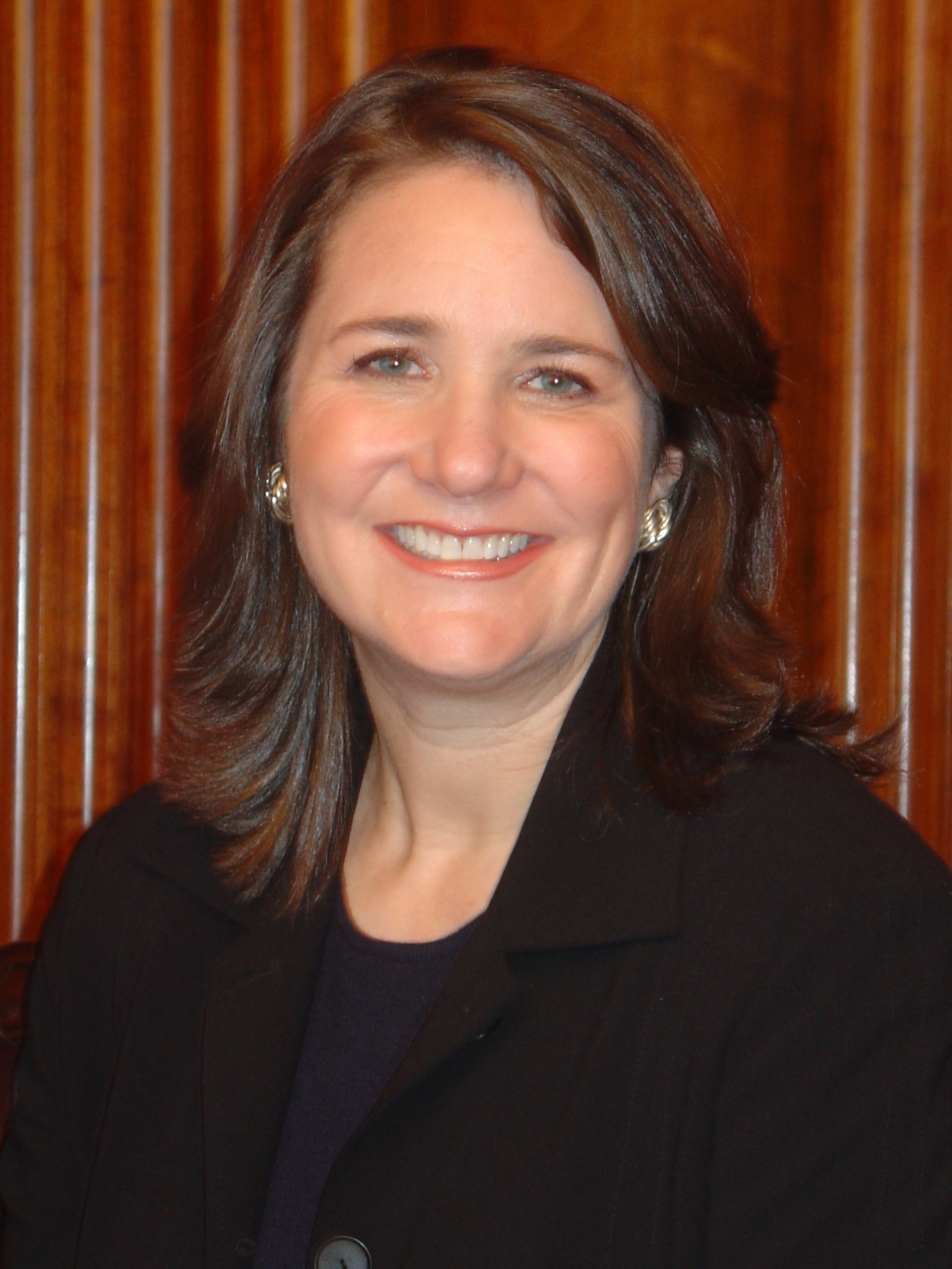

| Nominee | Diana DeGette | Thomas Kelly |
| Party | Democratic | Green |
| Popular vote | 129,446 | 32,825 |
| Percentage | 79.8% | 20.2% |
- County results DeGette: 70–80% 80–90% Kelly: 90–100%
U.S. Representative before election
Diana DeGette
Democratic
Elected U.S. Representative
Diana DeGette
Democratic

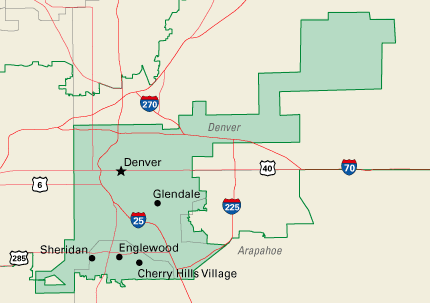

Incumbent Democrat Diana DeGette, who had represented the district since 1997, ran for re-election. She was re-elected with 73.5% of the vote in 2004 and the district had a PVI of D+18.

=== Democratic primary ===
==== Candidates ====
===== Nominee =====
- Diana DeGette, incumbent U.S. Representative

==== Results ====
Democratic primary results
| Party | Candidate | Votes | % |
|---|---|---|---|
| Democratic | Diana DeGette (incumbent) | 26,000 | 100.0 |
| Total votes | | 26,000 | 100.0 |

=== Republican primary ===
No Republicans filed.

=== Green primary ===
==== Candidates ====
===== Nominee =====
- Thomas Kelly, professional engineer

=== General election ===
==== Endorsements ====
Diana DeGette (D)

Newspapers

- The Denver Post

==== Predictions ====
| Source | Ranking | As of |
|---|---|---|
| The Cook Political Report | Safe D | November 6, 2006 |
| Rothenberg | Safe D | November 6, 2006 |
| Sabato's Crystal Ball | Safe D | November 6, 2006 |
| Real Clear Politics | Safe D | November 7, 2006 |
| CQ Politics | Safe D | November 7, 2006 |

==== Results ====
Colorado's 1st congressional district election, 2006
| Party | Candidate | Votes | % |
|---|---|---|---|
| Democratic | Diana DeGette (incumbent) | 129,446 | 79.8 |
| Green | Thomas Kelly | 32,825 | 20.2 |
| Majority | | 96,621 | 59.5 |
| Total votes | | 162,271 | 100.00 |
| Democratic hold | | | |

==== Finances ====
===== Campaigns =====
| Candidate (party) | Raised | Spent | Cash on hand |
|---|---|---|---|
| Diana DeGette (D) | $632,594 | $642,405 | $223,387 |
| Thomas Kelly (C) | Unreported | | |

===== Outside Spending =====
| Candidate (party) | Supported | Opposed |
|---|---|---|
| Diana DeGette (D) | $7,596 | $0 |
| Thomas Kelly (G) | $0 | $0 |

== District 2 ==
2006 Colorado's 2nd congressional district election
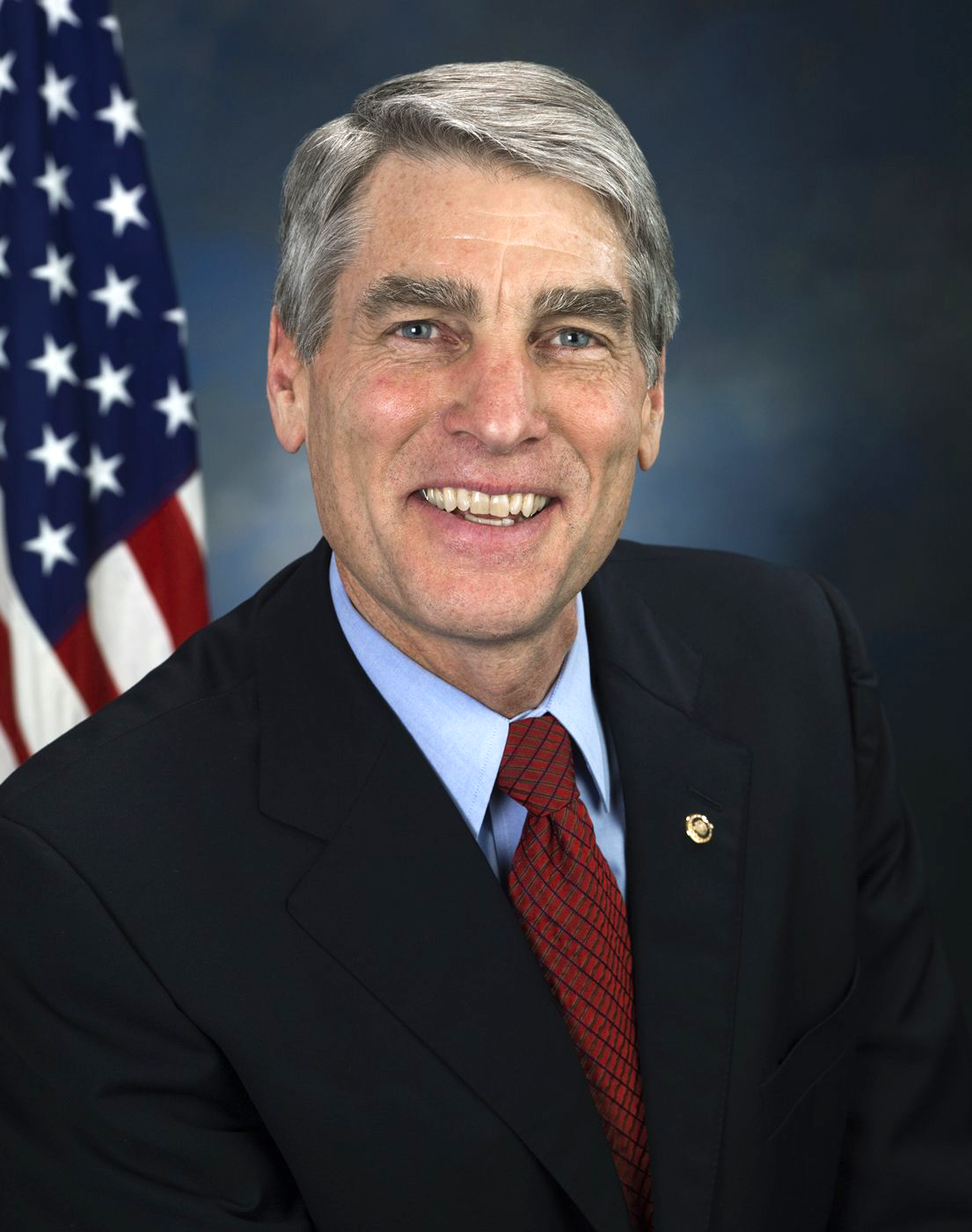

| Nominee | Mark Udall | Rich Mancuso |
| Party | Democratic | Republican |
| Popular vote | 157,850 | 65,481 |
| Percentage | 68.2% | 28.3% |
- County results Udall: 50–60% 60–70% 70–80%
U.S. Representative before election
Mark Udall
Democratic
Elected U.S. Representative
Mark Udall
Democratic

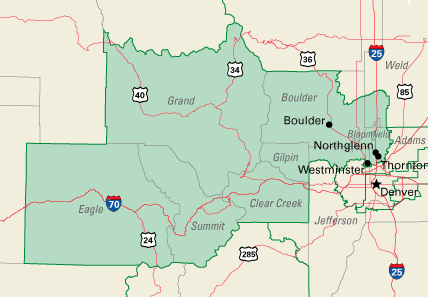

Incumbent Democrat Mark Udall, who had represented the district since 1999, ran for re-election. He was re-elected with 60.1% of the vote in 2004 and the district had a PVI of D+8.

=== Democratic primary ===
==== Candidates ====
===== Nominee =====
- Mark Udall, incumbent U.S. Representative

==== Results ====
Democratic primary results
| Party | Candidate | Votes | % |
|---|---|---|---|
| Democratic | Mark Udall (incumbent) | 23,725 | 100.0 |
| Total votes | | 23,725 | 100.0 |

=== Republican primary ===
==== Candidates ====
===== Nominee =====
- Rich Mancuso, history teacher

==== Results ====
Republican primary results
| Party | Candidate | Votes | % |
|---|---|---|---|
| Republican | Rich Mancuso | 15,396 | 100.0 |
| Total votes | | 15,396 | 100.0 |

=== Libertarian primary ===
==== Candidates ====
===== Nominee =====
- Norm Olsen, software developer, nominee for state representative in 2000 and for this seat in 2002 and 2004

=== Green primary ===
==== Candidates ====
===== Nominee =====
- J. A. Calhoun

=== General election ===
==== Endorsements ====
Mark Udall (D)

Newspapers

- The Denver Post

==== Predictions ====
| Source | Ranking | As of |
|---|---|---|
| The Cook Political Report | Safe D | November 6, 2006 |
| Rothenberg | Safe D | November 6, 2006 |
| Sabato's Crystal Ball | Safe D | November 6, 2006 |
| Real Clear Politics | Safe D | November 7, 2006 |
| CQ Politics | Safe D | November 7, 2006 |

==== Results ====
Colorado's 2nd congressional district election, 2006
| Party | Candidate | Votes | % |
|---|---|---|---|
| Democratic | Mark Udall (incumbent) | 157,850 | 68.2 |
| Republican | Rich Mancuso | 65,481 | 28.3 |
| Libertarian | Norm Olsen | 5,025 | 2.2 |
| Green | J. A. Calhoun | 2,951 | 1.3 |
| Majority | | 92,369 | 39.9 |
| Total votes | | 231,307 | 100.00 |
| Democratic hold | | | |

==== Finances ====
===== Campaigns =====
| Candidate (party) | Raised | Spent | Cash on hand |
|---|---|---|---|
| Mark Udall (D) | $1,512,865 | $932,188 | $1,262,370 |
| Rich Mancuso (R) | $14,900 | $14,498 | $99 |
| Norm Olsen (L) | Unreported | | |

===== Outside Spending =====
| Candidate (party) | Supported | Opposed |
|---|---|---|
| Mark Udall (D) | $711 | $0 |
| Rich Mancuso (R) | $0 | $0 |
| Norm Olsen (L) | $0 | $0 |

== District 3 ==
2006 Colorado's 3rd congressional district election
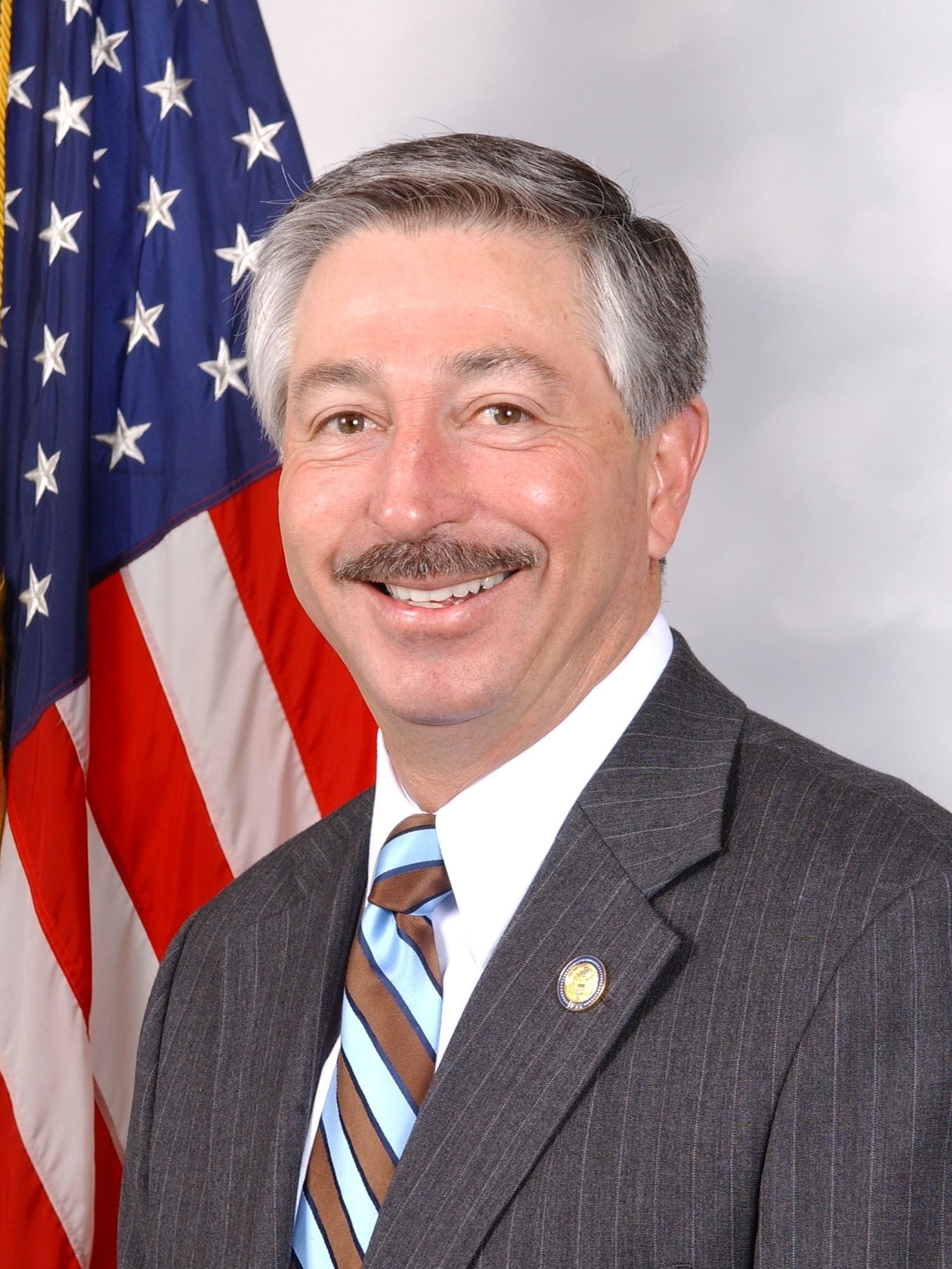

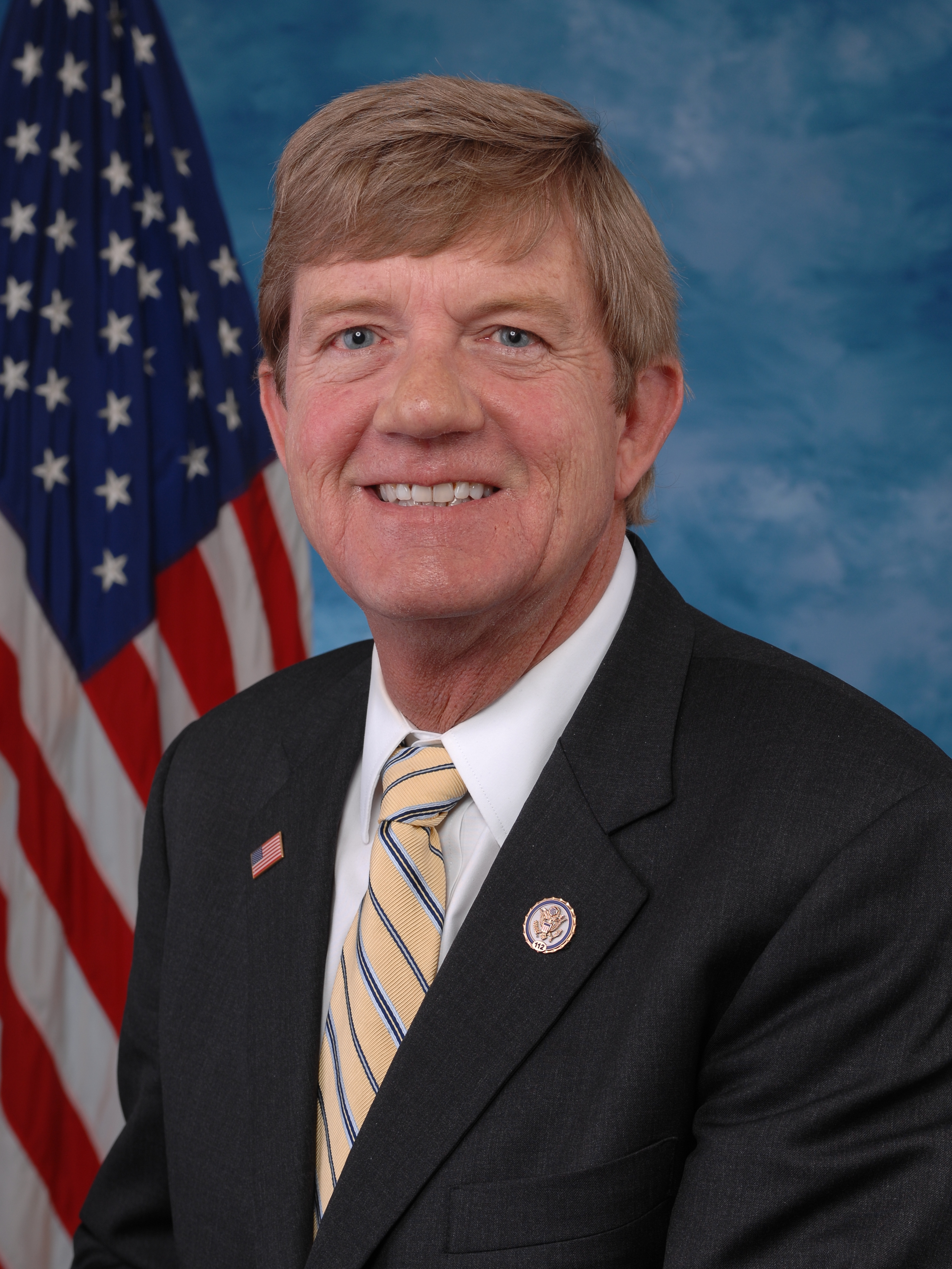
| Nominee | John Salazar | Scott Tipton |
| Party | Democratic | Republican |
| Popular vote | 146,488 | 86,930 |
| Percentage | 61.59% | 36.55% |
- County results Salazar: 40–50% 50–60% 60–70% 70–80% 80–90% Tipton: 40–50% 50–60%
U.S. Representative before election
John Salazar
Democratic
Elected U.S. Representative
John Salazar
Democratic

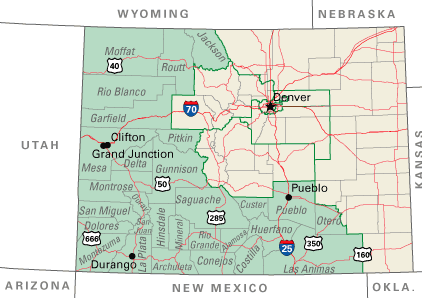

Incumbent Democrat John Salazar (brother of Senator Ken Salazar), who had represented the conservative, west Colorado district since 2005, ran for re-election. He was elected with 50.6% of the vote in 2004 and the district had a PVI of R+6.

=== Democratic primary ===
==== Candidates ====
===== Nominee =====
- John Salazar, incumbent U.S. Representative

==== Results ====
Democratic primary results
| Party | Candidate | Votes | % |
|---|---|---|---|
| Democratic | John Salazar (incumbent) | 21,871 | 100.0 |
| Total votes | | 21,871 | 100.0 |

=== Republican primary ===
==== Candidates ====
===== Nominee =====
- Scott Tipton, businessman

===== Declined =====
- Matt Smith, state representative and candidate for this seat in 2004
- Greg Walcher, former Executive Director of the Department of Natural Resources and nominee for this seat in 2004

==== Results ====
Republican primary results
| Party | Candidate | Votes | % |
|---|---|---|---|
| Republican | Scott Tipton | 28,482 | 100.0 |
| Total votes | | 28,482 | 100.0 |

=== Libertarian primary ===
==== Candidates ====
===== Nominee =====
- Bert Sargent, engineer

=== General election ===
==== Endorsements ====
John Salazar (D)

Organizations

- Democratic Congressional Campaign Committee "Frontline" Program

Individuals

- Wesley Clark, retired Army General and 2004 democratic presidential candidate

Newspapers

- The Denver Post

==== Polling ====
| Poll source | Date(s) administered | Sample size | Margin of error | John Salazar (D) | Scott Tipton (R) | Bert Sargent (L) | Undecided |
|---|---|---|---|---|---|---|---|
| SurveyUSA (KUSA-TV) | October 26–29, 2006 | 611 (LV) | ±4.0% | 57% | 38% | 2% | 4% |
| SurveyUSA (KUSA-TV) | September 15–17, 2006 | 474 (LV) | ±4.6% | 52% | 41% | 3% | 4% |
| SurveyUSA (KUSA-TV) | August 12–14, 2006 | 456 (LV) | ±4.7% | 53% | 42% | 4% | 3% |

==== Predictions ====
| Source | Ranking | As of |
|---|---|---|
| The Cook Political Report | Likely D | November 6, 2006 |
| Rothenberg | Safe D | November 6, 2006 |
| Sabato's Crystal Ball | Safe D | November 6, 2006 |
| Real Clear Politics | Safe D | November 7, 2006 |
| CQ Politics | Likely D | November 7, 2006 |

==== Results ====
Colorado's 3rd congressional district election, 2006
| Party | Candidate | Votes | % |
|---|---|---|---|
| Democratic | John Salazar (incumbent) | 146,488 | 61.6 |
| Republican | Scott Tipton | 86,930 | 36.5 |
| Libertarian | Bert Sargent | 4,417 | 1.9 |
| Green | Bruce Lohmiller (Write-in) | 23 | 0.0 |
| Majority | | 59,558 | 25.0 |
| Total votes | | 237,858 | 100.00 |
| Democratic hold | | | |

==== Finances ====
===== Campaigns =====
| Candidate (party) | Raised | Spent | Cash on hand |
|---|---|---|---|
| John Salazar (D) | $2,028,066 | $2,033,671 | $30,859 |
| Scott Tipton (R) | $821,303 | $819,314 | $1,985 |
| Bert Sargent (L) | $1,829 | $1,753 | $0 |

===== Outside Spending =====
| Candidate (party) | Supported | Opposed |
|---|---|---|
| John Salazar (D) | $96,518 | $0 |
| Scott Tipton (R) | $9,490 | $0 |
| Bert Sargent (L) | $0 | $0 |

== District 4 ==
2006 Colorado's 4th congressional district election
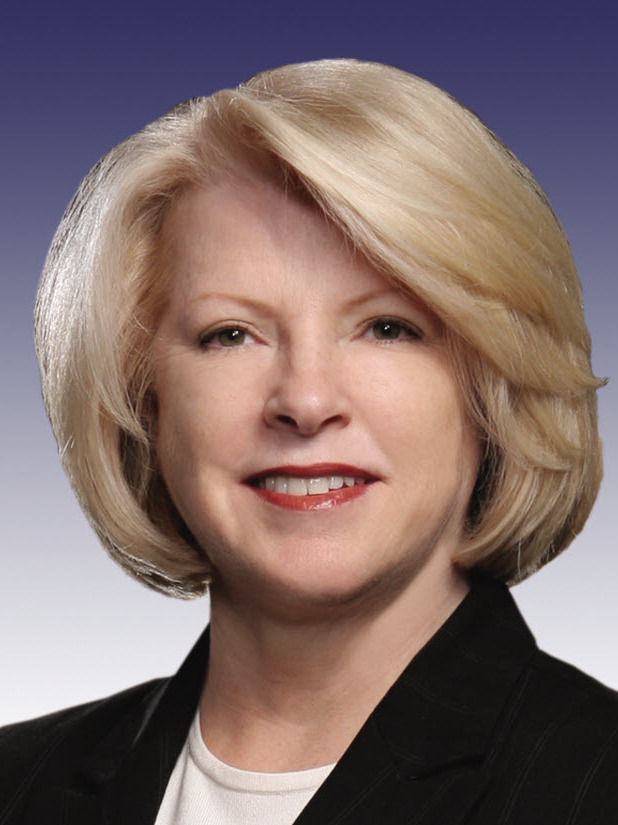

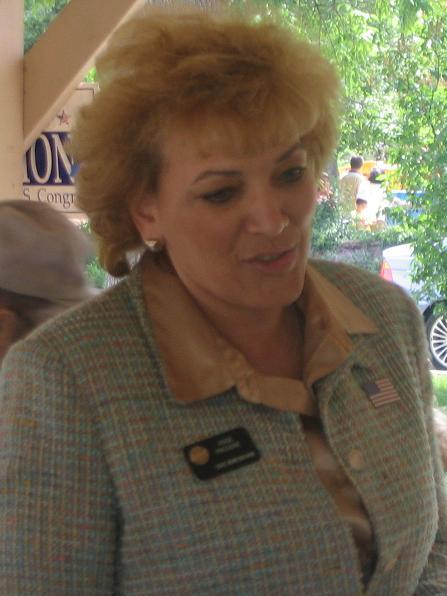

| Nominee | Marilyn Musgrave | Angie Paccione | Eric Eidsness |
| Party | Republican | Democratic | Reform |
| Popular vote | 109,732 | 103,748 | 27,133 |
| Percentage | 45.6% | 43.1% | 11.3% |
- County results Musgrave: 40–50% 50–60% 60–70% 70–80% Paccione: 40–50%
U.S. Representative before election
Marilyn Musgrave
Republican
Elected U.S. Representative
Marilyn Musgrave
Republican

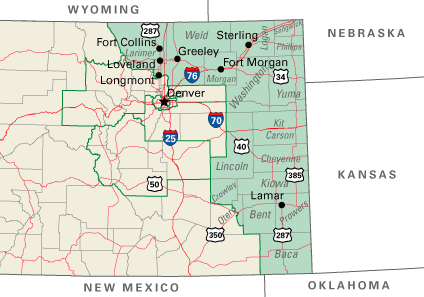

Incumbent Republican Marilyn Musgrave, who had represented this conservative east Colorado-based district since 2003, ran for re-election. She was re-elected with 51.0% of the vote in 2004 and the district had a PVI of R+9.

=== Republican primary ===
==== Candidates ====
===== Nominee =====
- Marilyn Musgrave, incumbent U.S. Representative

==== Results ====
Republican primary results
| Party | Candidate | Votes | % |
|---|---|---|---|
| Republican | Marilyn Musgrave (incumbent) | 32,205 | 100.0 |
| Total votes | | 32,205 | 100.0 |

=== Democratic primary ===
==== Candidates ====
===== Nominee =====
- Angie Paccione, state representative

===== Declined =====
- Stan Matsunaka, former President of the Colorado Senate and nominee for this seat in 2002 and 2004
- Wes McKinley, state representative
- Peggy Reeves, former state senator

==== Results ====
Democratic primary results
| Party | Candidate | Votes | % |
|---|---|---|---|
| Democratic | Angie Paccione | 16,398 | 100.0 |
| Total votes | | 16,398 | 100.0 |

=== Reform primary ===
==== Candidates ====
===== Nominee =====
- Eric Eidsness, former EPA Assistant Administrator for Water

=== General election ===
==== Endorsements ====
Angie Paccione (D)

Organizations

- Democratic Congressional Campaign Committee "Red to Blue" Program

Individuals

- Wesley Clark, retired Army General and 2004 democratic presidential candidate

Newspapers

- The Denver Post

==== Predictions ====
| Source | Ranking | As of |
|---|---|---|
| The Cook Political Report | Tossup | November 6, 2006 |
| Rothenberg | Tilt R | November 6, 2006 |
| Sabato's Crystal Ball | Tilt D (flip) | November 6, 2006 |
| Real Clear Politics | Lean R | November 7, 2006 |
| CQ Politics | Lean R | November 7, 2006 |

==== Results ====
Colorado's 4th congressional district election, 2006
| Party | Candidate | Votes | % |
|---|---|---|---|
| Republican | Marilyn Musgrave (incumbent) | 109,732 | 45.6 |
| Democratic | Angie Paccione | 103,748 | 43.1 |
| Reform | Eric Eidsness | 27,133 | 11.3 |
| Majority | | 5,984 | 2.5 |
| Total votes | | 240,613 | 100.0 |
| Republican hold | | | |

==== Finances ====
===== Campaigns =====
| Candidate (party) | Raised | Spent | Cash on hand |
|---|---|---|---|
| Marilyn Musgrave (R) | $3,160,640 | $3,212,143 | $71,009 |
| Angie Paccione (D) | $1,977,177 | $1,951,180 | $25,997 |
| Eric Eidsness (R) | $26,983 | $31,808 | $1,474 |

===== Outside Spending =====
| Candidate (party) | Supported | Opposed |
|---|---|---|
| Marilyn Musgrave (R) | $219,852 | $371,438 |
| Angie Paccione (D) | $322,674 | $1,749,868 |
| Eric Eidsness (R) | $0 | $0 |

== District 5 ==
2006 Colorado's 5th congressional district election
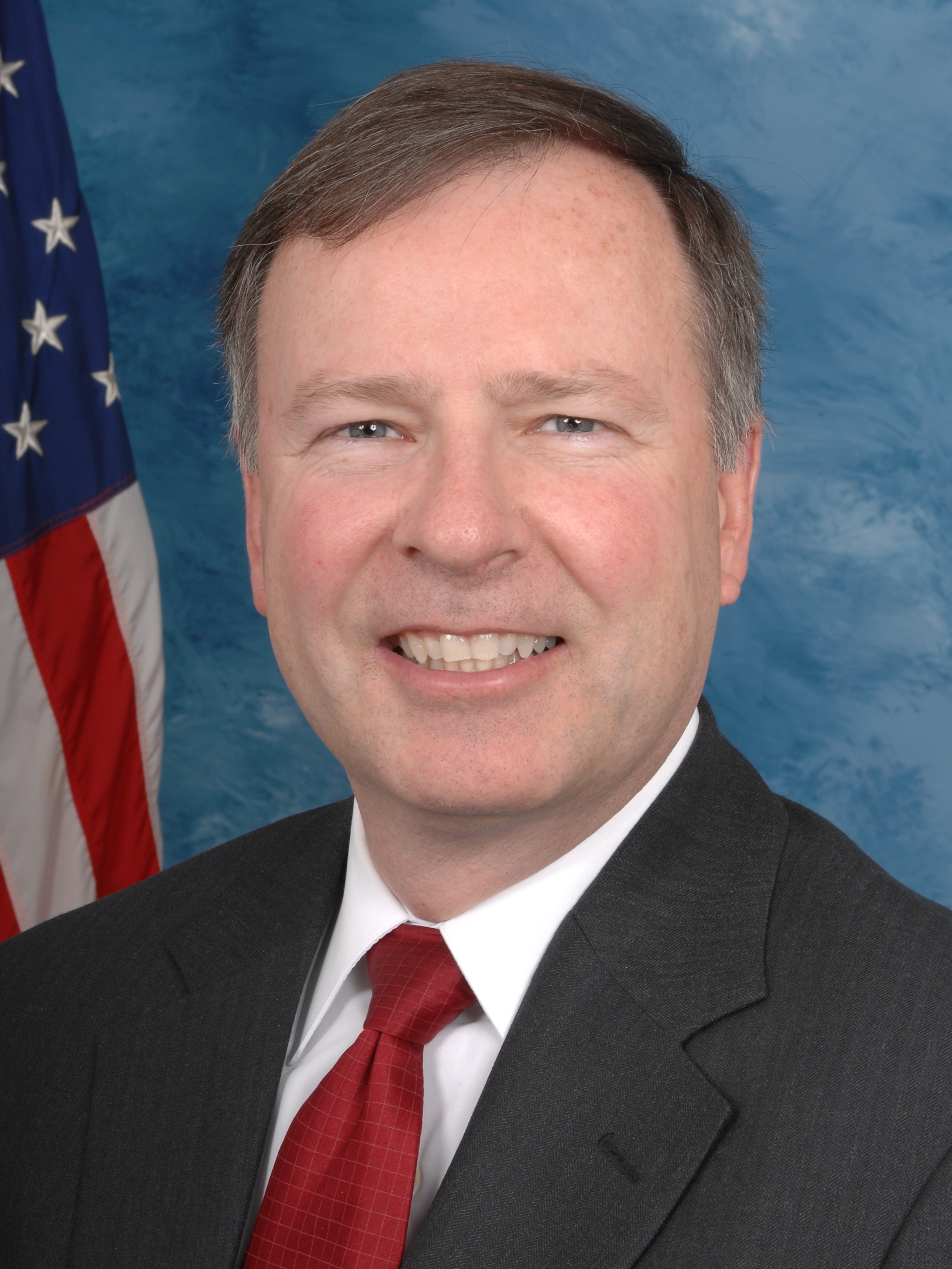

| Nominee | Doug Lamborn | Jay Fawcett |
| Party | Republican | Democratic |
| Popular vote | 123,264 | 83,431 |
| Percentage | 59.6% | 40.4% |
- County results Fawcett: 50–60% 60–70% Lamborn: 50–60% 60–70%
U.S. Representative before election
Joel Hefley
Republican
Elected U.S. Representative
Doug Lamborn
Republican

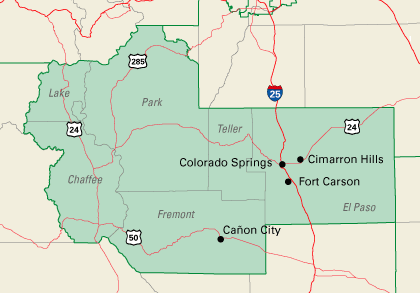

Incumbent Republican Joel Hefley, who had represented this conservative district based in Colorado Springs and its suburbs district since 1987, retired rather than run for re-election. He was re-elected with 70.5% of the vote in 2004 and the district had a PVI of R+16.

=== Republican primary ===
==== Candidates ====
===== Nominee =====
- Doug Lamborn, state senator

===== Eliminated in primary =====
- John Anderson, former El Paso County Sheriff
- Duncan Bremer, former El Paso County Commissioner
- Jeff Crank, Greater Colorado Springs Chamber of Commerce vice president and former Hefley aide
- Bentley Rayburn, United States Air Force Major General
- Lionel Rivera, Mayor of Colorado Springs

===== Declined =====
- Jack Gloriod, realtor and activist
- Ted Haggard, Presidents of the National Association of Evangelicals
- Joel Hefley, incumbent U.S. Representative
- Keith King, state house Majority Leader
- Jeff Wells, former state senate Majority Leader
- Wayne W. Williams, El Paso County Commissioner

==== Endorsements ====
John Anderson

Individuals

- Dan Corsentino, Pueblo County Sheriff and candidate for the 6th district in 2004
Jeff Crank

U.S. representatives

- Joel Hefley, U.S. representative from Colorado's 5th congressional district (1987–present)

Organizations

- Greater Colorado Springs Chamber of Commerce
- Housing and Building Association of Colorado Springs
- Pikes Peak Association of Realtors
Doug Lamborn

U.S. Senator

- William L. Armstrong, former U.S. Senator (1979–1991)

Organizations

- Club for Growth

==== Results ====
Republican primary results
| Party | Candidate | Votes | % |
|---|---|---|---|
| Republican | Douglas Lamborn | 15,126 | 27.0 |
| Republican | Jeff Crank | 14,234 | 25.4 |
| Republican | Bentley Rayburn | 9,735 | 17.6 |
| Republican | Lionel Rivera | 7,213 | 12.9 |
| Republican | John Anderson | 6,474 | 11.5 |
| Republican | Duncan Bremer | 3,310 | 5.9 |
| Total votes | | 56,092 | 100.0 |

=== Democratic primary ===
==== Candidates ====
===== Nominee =====
- Jay Fawcett, retired Air Force Lieutenant Colonel

==== Results ====
Democratic primary results
| Party | Candidate | Votes | % |
|---|---|---|---|
| Democratic | Jay Fawcett | 10,238 | 100.0 |
| Total votes | | 10,238 | 100.0 |

=== General election ===
On August 29, 2006, Hefley expressed anger that his successor was not his top aide, Jeff Crank. Commenting on the primary campaign, Hefley said, "I spent eight years trying to get rid of the sleaze factor in Congress. [...] It's not something I can do to help put more sleaze factor in Congress." Hefley was incensed at tactics such as a mailed brochure from the Christian Coalition of Colorado associating Crank with "public support for members and efforts of the homosexual agenda." Hefley said that he "suspected, but couldn't prove, collusion between Lamborn's campaign, which is managed by Jon Hotaling, and the Christian Coalition of Colorado, which is run by Hotaling's brother, Mark." Hefley called it "one of the sleaziest, most dishonest campaigns I've seen in a long time," and refused to endorse Lamborn.

==== Endorsements ====
Doug Lamborn (R)

U.S. Senator

- William L. Armstrong, former U.S. Senator (1979–1991)

Organizations

- Club for Growth
Jay Fawcett (D)

Organizations

- Democratic Congressional Campaign Committee "Red to Blue" Program

Individuals

- Wesley Clark, retired Army General and 2004 democratic presidential candidate

Newspapers

- The Denver Post

==== Polling ====
| Poll source | Date(s) administered | Sample size | Margin of error | Doug Lamborn (R) | Jay Fawcett (D) | Undecided |
|---|---|---|---|---|---|---|
| SurveyUSA (KUSA-TV) | November 1–3, 2006 | 596 (LV) | ±4.1% | 51% | 42% | 7% |

==== Predictions ====
| Source | Ranking | As of |
|---|---|---|
| The Cook Political Report | Lean R | November 6, 2006 |
| Rothenberg | Likely R | November 6, 2006 |
| Sabato's Crystal Ball | Lean R | November 6, 2006 |
| Real Clear Politics | Safe R | November 7, 2006 |
| CQ Politics | Likely R | November 7, 2006 |

==== Results ====
Colorado's 5th congressional district election, 2006
| Party | Candidate | Votes | % |
|---|---|---|---|
| Republican | Doug Lamborn | 123,264 | 59.6 |
| Democratic | Jay Fawcett | 83,431 | 40.4 |
| Write-in | | 61 | 0.0 |
| Majority | | 39,833 | 19.3 |
| Total votes | | 206,756 | 100.0 |
| Republican hold | | | |

==== Finances ====
===== Campaigns =====
| Candidate (party) | Raised | Spent | Cash on hand |
|---|---|---|---|
| Doug Lamborn (R) | $973,682 | $945,473 | $28,207 |
| Jay Fawcett (D) | $676,370 | $664,121 | $12,249 |

===== Outside Spending =====
| Candidate (party) | Supported | Opposed |
|---|---|---|
| Doug Lamborn (R) | $121,353 | $0 |
| Jay Fawcett (D) | $85,084 | $148,233 |

== District 6 ==
2006 Colorado's 6th congressional district election
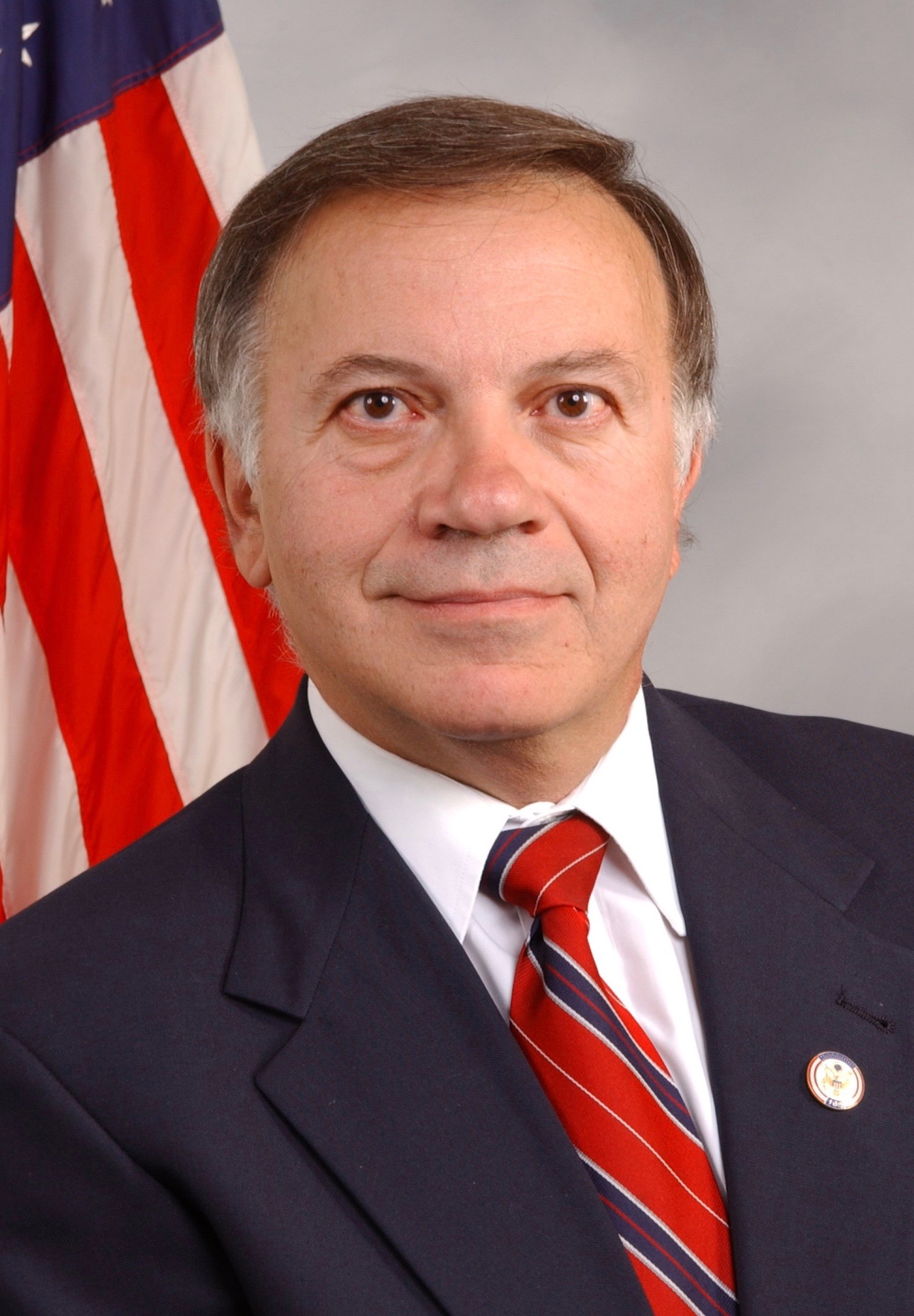

| Nominee | Tom Tancredo | Bill Winter |
| Party | Republican | Democratic |
| Popular vote | 158,806 | 108,007 |
| Percentage | 58.6% | 39.9% |
- County results Tancredo: 50–60% 60–70% 70–80%
U.S. Representative before election
Tom Tancredo
Republican
Elected U.S. Representative
Tom Tancredo
Republican

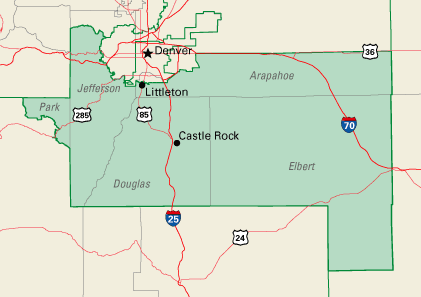

Incumbent Republican Tom Tancredo, who had represented this solidly conservative district based in the Denver suburbs since 1999, ran for re-election. He was re-elected with 59.5% of the vote in 2004 and the district had a PVI of R+10.

=== Republican primary ===
==== Candidates ====
===== Nominee =====
- Tom Tancredo, incumbent U.S. Representative

==== Results ====
Republican primary results
| Party | Candidate | Votes | % |
|---|---|---|---|
| Republican | Tom Tancredo (incumbent) | 44,039 | 100.0 |
| Total votes | | 44,039 | 100.0 |

=== Democratic primary ===
==== Candidates ====
===== Nominee =====
- Bill Winter, lawyer and former legislative aide to Senator John McCain

==== Results ====
Democratic primary results
| Party | Candidate | Votes | % |
|---|---|---|---|
| Democratic | Bill Winter | 18,673 | 100.0 |
| Total votes | | 18,673 | 100.0 |

=== Libertarian primary ===
==== Candidates ====
===== Nominee =====
- Jack Woehr, computer programmer, Democratic candidate for this seat in 1994 and nominee in 2004

=== General election ===
==== Endorsements ====
Tom Tancredo (R)

Newspapers

- The Denver Post

==== Predictions ====
| Source | Ranking | As of |
|---|---|---|
| The Cook Political Report | Safe R | November 6, 2006 |
| Rothenberg | Safe R | November 6, 2006 |
| Sabato's Crystal Ball | Likely R | November 6, 2006 |
| Real Clear Politics | Safe R | November 7, 2006 |
| CQ Politics | Safe R | November 7, 2006 |

==== Results ====
Colorado's 6th congressional district election, 2006
| Party | Candidate | Votes | % |
|---|---|---|---|
| Republican | Tom Tancredo (incumbent) | 158,806 | 58.6 |
| Democratic | Bill Winter | 108,007 | 39.9 |
| Libertarian | Jack Woehr | 4,093 | 1.5 |
| Write-in | | 25 | 0.0 |
| Majority | | 50,799 | 18.8 |
| Total votes | | 270,931 | 100.0 |
| Republican hold | | | |

==== Finances ====
===== Campaigns =====
| Candidate (party) | Raised | Spent | Cash on hand |
|---|---|---|---|
| Tom Tancredo (R) | $1,781,975 | $1,724,235 | $219,092 |
| Bill Winter (D) | $801,629 | $801,136 | $390 |
| Jack Woehr (L) | Unreported | | |

===== Outside Spending =====
| Candidate (party) | Supported | Opposed |
|---|---|---|
| Tom Tancredo (R) | $109 | $0 |
| Bill Winter (D) | $2,232 | $0 |
| Jack Woehr (L) | $0 | $0 |

== District 7 ==
2006 Colorado's 7th congressional district election
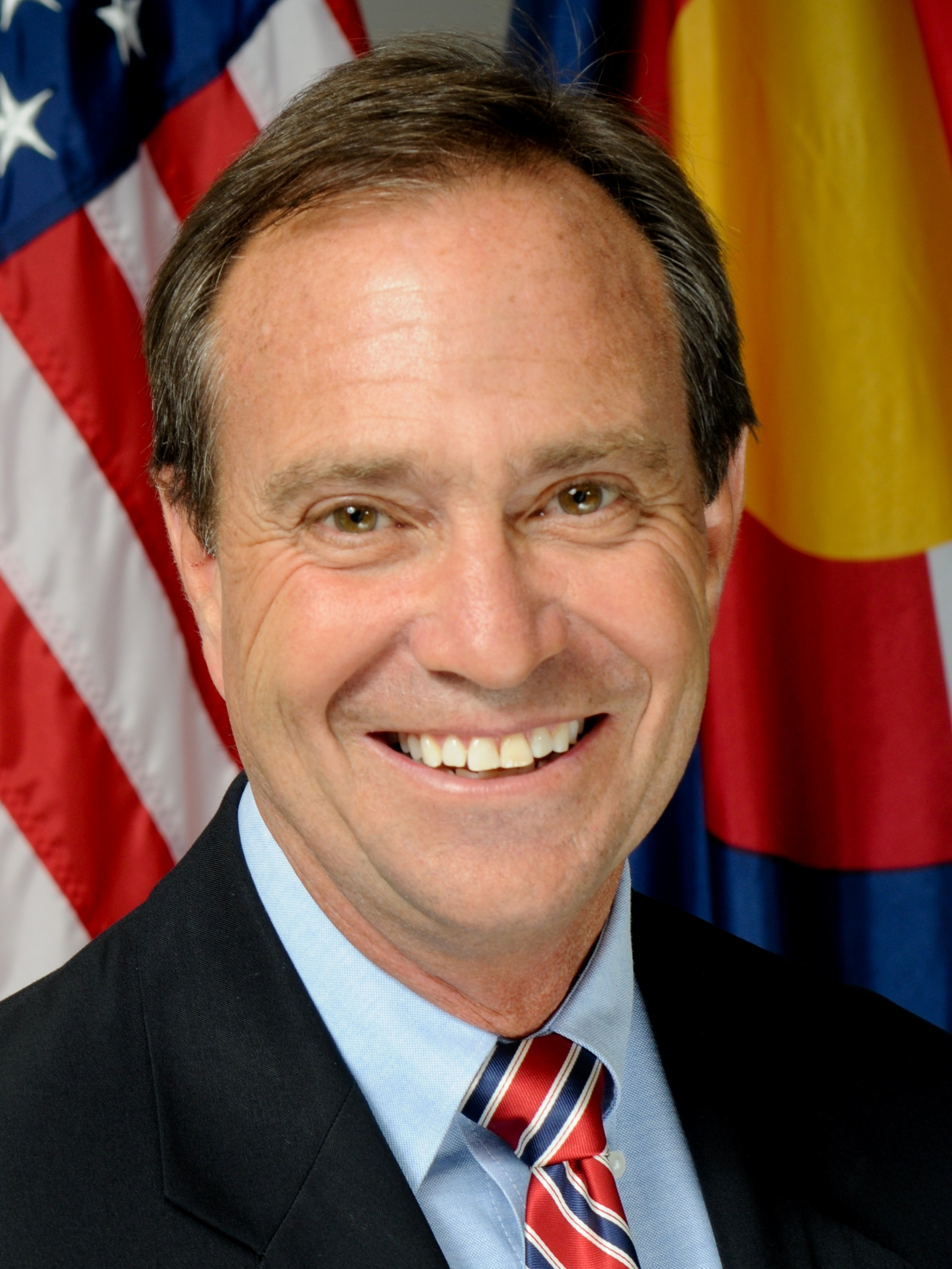

| Nominee | Ed Perlmutter | Rick O'Donnell |
| Party | Democratic | Republican |
| Popular vote | 103,918 | 79,571 |
| Percentage | 54.9% | 42.1% |
- County results Perlmutter: 50–60%
U.S. Representative before election
Bob Beauprez
Republican
Elected U.S. Representative
Ed Perlmutter
Democratic

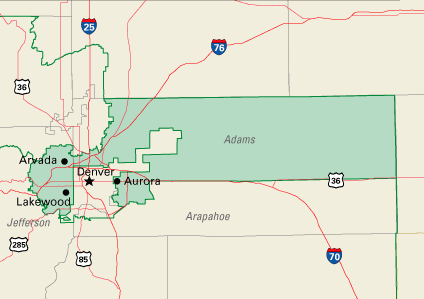

Incumbent Republican Bob Beauprez, who had represented the district since 2003, decided to run for Governor rather than for re-election. He was re–elected with 55.7% of the vote in 2004 and the district had a PVI of D+2.

=== Republican primary ===
==== Candidates ====
===== Nominee =====
- Rick O'Donnell, executive director of the Colorado Commission on Higher Education and candidate for this seat in 2002

===== Declined =====
- Bob Beauprez, incumbent U.S. Representative (running for Governor)
- Mike Coffman, State Treasurer
- Mark Paschall, Jefferson County Treasurer

==== Results ====
Republican primary results
| Party | Candidate | Votes | % |
|---|---|---|---|
| Republican | Rick O'Donnell | 20,535 | 100.0 |
| Total votes | | 20,535 | 100.0 |

=== Democratic primary ===
With Beauprez declining to seek a third term this district emerged as a top pick-up opportunity for House Democrats.

==== Candidates ====
===== Nominee =====
- Ed Perlmutter, former state senator

===== Eliminated in primary =====
- Peggy Lamm, former state representative
- Herb Rubenstein, attorney and business leadership consultant

===== Withdrawn =====
- Joanna Conti, businesswoman and nominee for the 6th district in 2004

==== Polling ====
| Poll source | Date(s) administered | Sample size | Margin of error | Peggy Lamm | Ed Perlmutter | Herb Rubenstein | Undecided |
|---|---|---|---|---|---|---|---|
| SurveyUSA (KUSA-TV) | August 4–6, 2006 | 592 (LV) | ±4.1% | 37% | 49% | 8% | 7% |
| SurveyUSA (KUSA-TV) | July 29–31, 2006 | 414 (LV) | ±4.9% | 31% | 51% | 10% | 8% |

==== Results ====
Democratic primary results
| Party | Candidate | Votes | % |
|---|---|---|---|
| Democratic | Ed Perlmutter | 15,598 | 53.3 |
| Democratic | Peggy Lamm | 11,047 | 37.7 |
| Democratic | Herb Rubenstein | 2,625 | 9.0 |
| Total votes | | 29,270 | 100.0 |

=== Green primary ===
==== Candidates ====
===== Nominee =====
- Dave Chandler

=== Constitution primary ===
==== Candidates ====
===== Nominee =====
- Roger McCarville

=== General election ===
==== Endorsements ====
Ed Perlmutter (D)

Organizations

- Democratic Congressional Campaign Committee "Red to Blue" Program

Individuals

- Wesley Clark, retired Army General and 2004 democratic presidential candidate

Newspapers

- The Denver Post

==== Polling ====
| Poll source | Date(s) administered | Sample size | Margin of error | Rick O'Donnell (R) | Ed Perlmutter (D) | Dave Chandler (G) | Roger McCarville (C) | Undecided |
|---|---|---|---|---|---|---|---|---|
| SurveyUSA (KUSA-TV) | October 29–31, 2006 | 589 (LV) | ±4.1% | 38% | 54% | 4% | 2% | 2% |
| SurveyUSA (KUSA-TV) | September 21–25, 2006 | 482 (LV) | ±4.5% | 37% | 54% | 2% | 1% | 6% |
| SurveyUSA (KUSA-TV) | August 18–20, 2006 | 535 (LV) | ±4.3% | 45% | 45% | 2% | 2% | 6% |

==== Predictions ====
| Source | Ranking | As of |
|---|---|---|
| The Cook Political Report | Lean D (flip) | November 6, 2006 |
| Rothenberg | Likely D (flip) | November 6, 2006 |
| Sabato's Crystal Ball | Likely D (flip) | November 6, 2006 |
| Real Clear Politics | Lean D (flip) | November 7, 2006 |
| CQ Politics | Lean D (flip) | November 7, 2006 |

==== Results ====
Colorado's 7th congressional district election, 2006
| Party | Candidate | Votes | % |
|---|---|---|---|
| Democratic | Ed Perlmutter | 103,918 | 54.9 |
| Republican | Rick O'Donnell | 79,571 | 42.1 |
| Green | Dave Chandler | 3,073 | 1.6 |
| American Constitution | Roger McCarville | 2,605 | 1.4 |
| Write-in | | 5 | 0.0 |
| Majority | | 24,347 | 12.9 |
| Total votes | | 189,172 | 100.0 |
| Democratic gain from Republican | | | |

==== Finances ====
===== Campaigns =====
| Candidate (party) | Raised | Spent | Cash on hand |
|---|---|---|---|
| Rick O'Donnell (R) | $2,818,132 | $2,767,663 | $46,934 |
| Ed Perlmutter (D) | $2,984,171 | $2,933,170 | $51,001 |
| Dave Chandler (G) | Unreported | | |
| Roger McCarville (C) | Unreported | | |

===== Outside Spending =====
| Candidate (party) | Supported | Opposed |
|---|---|---|
| Rick O'Donnell (R) | $212,018 | $1,435,949 |
| Ed Perlmutter (D) | $666,516 | $519,975 |
| Dave Chandler (G) | $0 | $0 |
| Roger McCarville (C) | $0 | $0 |
