= 2002 United States House of Representatives elections in Colorado =

- November 5, 2002

All 7 Colorado seats to the United States House of Representatives
	Majority party	Minority party
Party	Republican	Democratic
Last election	4 seats, 59.65%	2 seats, 30.55%
Seats before	4	2
Seats won	5	2
Seat change	▲1	Steady
Popular vote	752,998	589,463
Percentage	53.90%	42.19%
Swing	▼5.75%	▲11.64%

Republican
40–50%
50–60%
60–70%
70–80%
80–90%
Democratic
40–50%
50–60%
60–70%

The 2002 congressional elections in Colorado were elections for Colorado's delegation to the United States House of Representatives, which occurred along with congressional elections nationwide on November 5, 2002. Colorado has seven seats, as apportioned during the 2000 United States census and thus gaining one since the previous election. Republicans gained a seat as result, with Republicans having five seats and Democrats having two seats.

== Overview ==
=== Statewide ===
Party	Candidates	Votes		Seats		
Party	Candidates	No.	%	No.	+/–	%
Republican	7	752,998	53.90	5	▲1	71.43
Democratic	7	589,463	42.19	2	Steady	28.57
Libertarian	7	38,831	2.78	0	Steady	0.0
Green	2	6,483	0.46	0	Steady	0.0
Natural Law	2	3,520	0.25	0	Steady	0.0
Reform	1	3,133	0.22	0	Steady	0.0
Constitution	2	2,427	0.17	0	Steady	0.0
Write-in	2	233	0.02	0	Steady	0.0
Total	30	1,397,088	100.0	7	▲1	100.0

Popular vote
Republican	53.90%
Democratic	42.19%
Libertarian	2.78%
Other	1.13%

House seats
Republican	71.43%
Democratic	28.57%

=== By district ===
Results of the 2002 United States House of Representatives elections in Colorado by district:

District	Republican		Democratic		Others		Total		Result
District	Votes	%	Votes	%	Votes	%	Votes	%	Result
District 1	49,884	29.59%	111,718	66.28%	6,962	4.13%	168,564	100.0%	Democratic hold
District 2	75,564	36.77%	123,504	60.09%	6,454	3.14%	205,522	100.0%	Democratic hold
District 3	143,433	65.80%	68,160	31.27%	6,379	2.93%	217,972	100.0%	Republican hold
District 4	115,359	54.94%	87,499	41.68%	7,097	3.38%	209,955	100.0%	Republican hold
District 5	128,118	69.37%	45,587	24.68%	10,972	5.94%	184,677	100.0%	Republican hold
District 6	158,851	66.88%	71,327	30.03%	7,323	3.08%	237,501	100.0%	Republican hold
District 7	81,789	47.31%	81,668	47.24%	9,422	5.45%	172,879	100.0%	Republican Win
Total	752,998	53.90%	589,463	42.19%	54,627	3.91%	1,397,088	100.0%	

== District 1 ==
2002 Colorado's 1st congressional district election
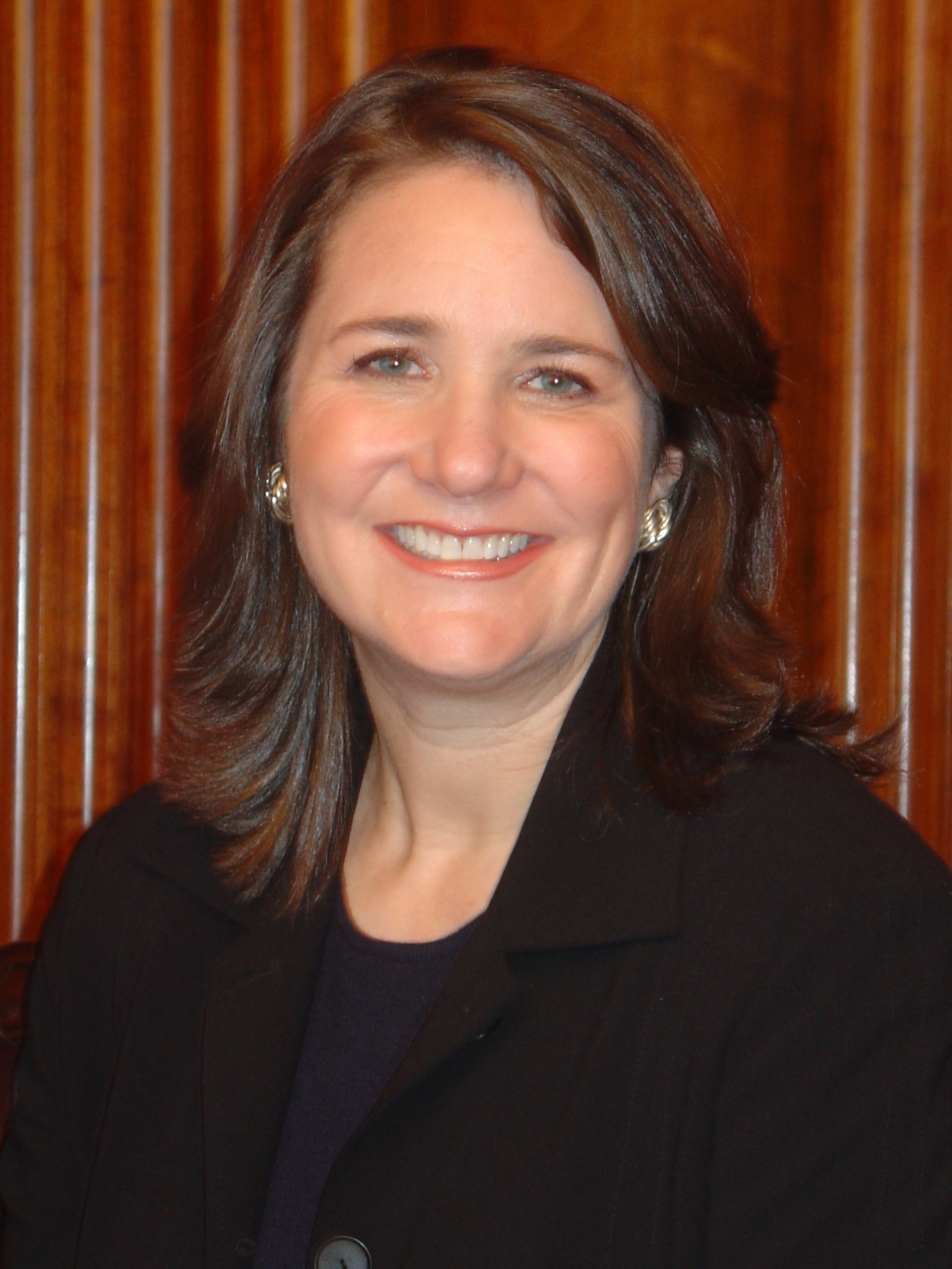

Nominee	Diana DeGette	Ken Chlouber
Party	Democratic	Republican
Popular vote	111,718	49,884
Percentage	66.3%	29.6%
- County results Degette: 50–60% 60–70% Chlouber: 100–100%
U.S. Representative before election
Diana DeGette
Democratic
Elected U.S. Representative
Diana DeGette
Democratic

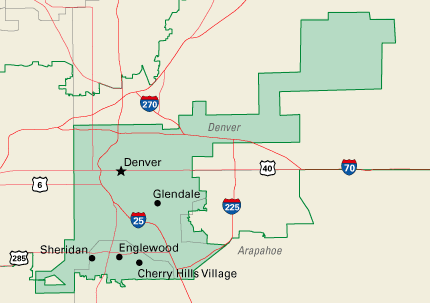

Following redistricting of Colorado's congressional districts, the 1st district consisted of all of the City and County of Denver and parts of Arapahoe County, including parts or all of the cities of Englewood, Cherry Hills Village, Sheridan, Aurora, and Glendale. Incumbent Democrat Diana DeGette, who had represented the district since 1997, ran for re-election. She was re-elected with 68.7% of the vote in 2000.

=== Democratic primary ===
==== Candidates ====
===== Nominee =====
- Diana DeGette, incumbent U.S. Representative

===== Eliminated in primary =====
- Ramona Martinez, Denver City Council member

==== Results ====
Democratic primary results
Party	Candidate	Votes	%
Democratic	Diana DeGette (incumbent)	24,526	73.5
Democratic	Ramona Martinez	8,853	26.5
Total votes		33,379	100.0

=== Republican primary ===
==== Candidates ====
===== Nominee =====
- Ken Chlouber, state senator

==== Results ====
Republican primary results
Party	Candidate	Votes	%
Republican	Ken Chlouber	14,516	100.0
Total votes		14,516	100.0

=== Libertarian primary ===
==== Candidates ====
===== Nominee =====
- Kent Leonard, analyst

=== Green primary ===
==== Candidates ====
===== Nominee =====
- Ken Seaman, publisher and former teacher

=== Constitution primary ===
==== Candidates ====
===== Nominee =====
- George Lilly, sales and marketing representative and nominee for state representative in 2000

=== General election ===
==== Endorsements ====
Diana DeGette (D)

Newspapers

- The Denver Post

==== Predictions ====
Source	Ranking	As of
Sabato's Crystal Ball	Safe D	November 4, 2002
New York Times	Safe D	October 14, 2002

==== Results ====
Colorado's 1st congressional district election, 2002
Party	Candidate	Votes	%
Democratic	Diana DeGette (incumbent)	111,718	66.3
Republican	Ken Chlouber	49,884	29.6
Green	Ken Seaman	3,209	1.9
Libertarian	Kent Leonard	2,584	1.5
American Constitution	George Lilly	1,169	0.7
Majority		61,834	36.7
Total votes		168,564	100.0
Democratic hold			

== District 2 ==
2002 Colorado's 2nd congressional district election
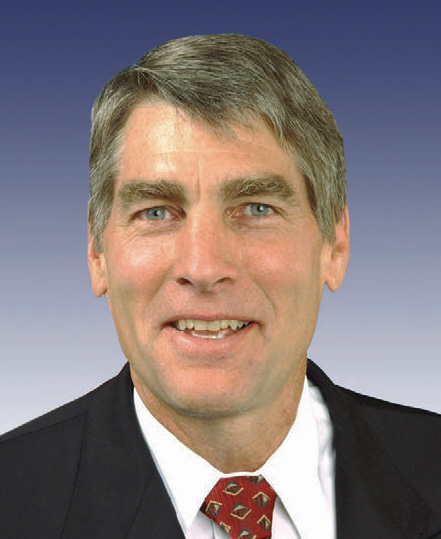

Nominee	Mark Udall	Sandy Hume
Party	Democratic	Republican
Popular vote	123,504	75,564
Percentage	60.1%	36.8%
- County results Udall: 40–50% 50–60% 60–70% Hume: 40–50% 50–60%
U.S. Representative before election
Mark Udall
Democratic
Elected U.S. Representative
Mark Udall
Democratic

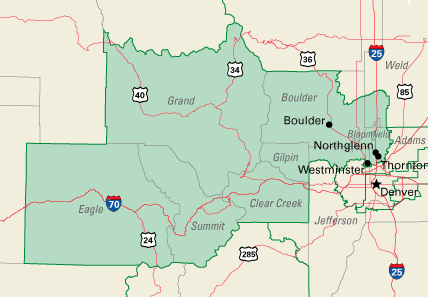

Following redistricting of Colorado's congressional districts, the 2nd district consisted of Broomfield, Clear Creek, Eagle, Gilpin, Grand, and Summit counties, as well as portions of Adams, Boulder, Jefferson, and Weld counties. Incumbent Democrat Mark Udall, who had represented the district since 1999, ran for re-election. He was re-elected with 55.0% of the vote in 2000.

=== Democratic primary ===
==== Candidates ====
===== Nominee =====
- Mark Udall, incumbent U.S. Representative

==== Results ====
Democratic primary results
Party	Candidate	Votes	%
Democratic	Mark Udall (incumbent)	13,205	100.0
Total votes		13,205	100.0

=== Republican primary ===
==== Candidates ====
===== Nominee =====
- Sandy Hume, Boulder Treasurer and former state senator

===== Eliminated in primary =====
- Bob Vehar, businessman

==== Results ====
Republican primary results
Party	Candidate	Votes	%
Republican	Sandy Hume	9,842	61.0
Republican	Bob Vehar	6,300	39.0
Total votes		16,142	100.0

=== Libertarian primary ===
==== Candidates ====
===== Nominee =====
- Norm Olsen, software developer and nominee for state representative in 2000

=== Constitution primary ===
==== Candidates ====
===== Nominee =====
- Erik Brauer, electronics technician

=== Natural Law primary ===
==== Candidates ====
===== Nominee =====
- Patrick West, software engineer, state chair of the Natural Law Party of Colorado, nominee for this seat in 1998 and for state senate in 2000

=== General election ===
==== Endorsements ====
Mark Udall (D)

Newspapers

- The Denver Post

==== Predictions ====
Source	Ranking	As of
Sabato's Crystal Ball	Safe D	November 4, 2002
New York Times	Safe D	October 14, 2002

==== Results ====
Colorado's 2nd congressional district election, 2002
Party	Candidate	Votes	%
Democratic	Mark Udall (incumbent)	123,504	60.1
Republican	Sandy Hume	75,564	36.8
Libertarian	Norm Olsen	3,579	1.7
Natural Law	Patrick West	1,617	0.8
American Constitution	Erik Brauer	1,258	0.6
Majority		47,940	23.3
Total votes		205,522	100.0
Democratic hold			

== District 3 ==
2002 Colorado's 3rd congressional district election
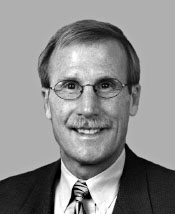

Nominee	Scott McInnis	Denis Berckefeldt
Party	Republican	Democratic
Popular vote	143,433	68,160
Percentage	65.8%	31.3%
- County results Mcinnis: 50–60% 60–70% 70–80% 80–90% Berckefeldt: 40–50% 50–60%
U.S. Representative before election
Scott McInnis
Republican
Elected U.S. Representative
Scott McInnis
Republican

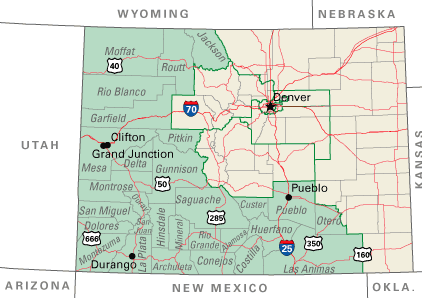

Incumbent Republican Scott McInnis, who had represented the district since 1993, ran for re-election. He was re-elected with 65.8% of the vote in 2000.

=== Republican primary ===
==== Candidates ====
===== Nominee =====
- Scott McInnis, incumbent U.S. Representative

==== Results ====
Republican primary results
Party	Candidate	Votes	%
Republican	Scott McInnis (incumbent)	31,149	100.0
Total votes		31,149	100.0

=== Democratic primary ===
==== Candidates ====
===== Nominee =====
- Denis Berckefeldt, former actor and chief of staff to state senator Bill Thiebaut

==== Results ====
Democratic primary results
Party	Candidate	Votes	%
Democratic	Denis Berckefeldt	15,732	100.0
Total votes		15,732	100.0

=== Libertarian primary ===
==== Candidates ====
===== Nominee =====
- Brent Shroyer, businessman, screenwriter, and retired teacher

=== Natural Law primary ===
==== Candidates ====
===== Nominee =====
- Gary Swing, performing arts promoter, Green nominee for state representative in 1996 and Pacifist Party nominee for U.S. Senate in 1998

=== General election ===
==== Endorsements ====
Scott McInnis (R)

Newspapers

- The Denver Post

==== Predictions ====
Source	Ranking	As of
Sabato's Crystal Ball	Safe R	November 4, 2002
New York Times	Safe R	October 14, 2002

==== Results ====
Colorado's 3rd congressional district election, 2002
Party	Candidate	Votes	%
Republican	Scott McInnis (incumbent)	143,433	65.8
Democratic	Denis Berckefeldt	68,160	31.3
Libertarian	Brent Shroyer	4,370	2.0
Natural Law	Gary Swing	1,903	0.9
Write-In	Jason Alessio	106	0.0
Majority		75,273	34.5
Total votes		217,972	100.0
Republican hold			

== District 4 ==
2002 Colorado's 4th congressional district election
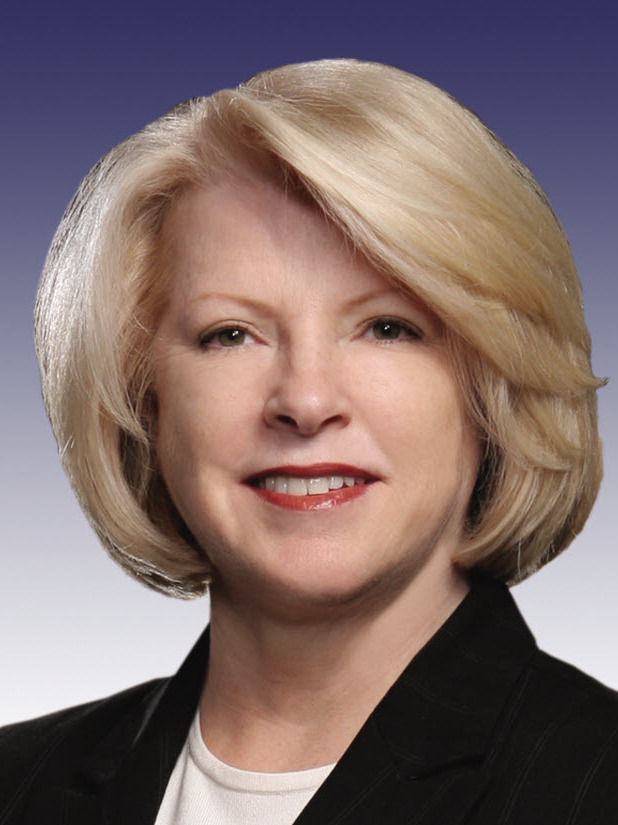

Nominee	Marilyn Musgrave	Stan Matsunaka
Party	Republican	Democratic
Popular vote	115,359	87,499
Percentage	54.9%	41.7%
- County results Musgrave: 40–50% 50–60% 60–70% 70–80%
U.S. Representative before election
Bob Schaffer
Republican
Elected U.S. Representative
Marilyn Musgrave
Republican

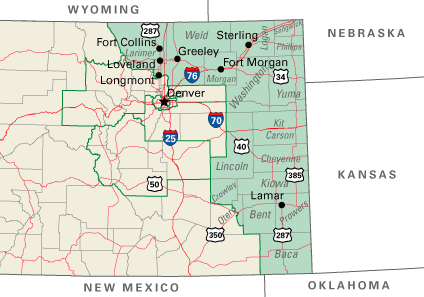

Incumbent Republican Bob Schaffer, who had represented the district since 1997, retired rather than run for re-election. He was re-elected with 79.5% of the vote in 2000.

=== Republican primary ===
==== Candidates ====
===== Nominee =====
- Marilyn Musgrave, state senator

===== Eliminated in primary =====
- Jeff Bedingfield, attorney and businessman

===== Declined =====
- Bob Schaffer, incumbent U.S. Representative

==== Results ====
After a somewhat bitter primary campaign the hardline conservative Musgrave defeated first time candidate Bedingfield 2 to 1.

Republican primary results
Party	Candidate	Votes	%
Republican	Marilyn Musgrave	28,683	64.6
Republican	Jeff Bedingfield	15,743	35.4
Total votes		44,426	100.0

=== Democratic primary ===
After being courted by Democratic house leader Dick Gephardt, Matsunaka opted to switch from the governor's race to run in the open 4th district.

==== Candidates ====
===== Nominee =====
- Stan Matsunaka, President of the Colorado Senate

==== Results ====
Democratic primary results
Party	Candidate	Votes	%
Democratic	Stan Matsunaka	12,235	100.0
Total votes		12,235	100.0

=== Libertarian primary ===
==== Candidates ====
===== Nominee =====
- John Volz, finance adjuster

=== General election ===
==== Predictions ====
Source	Ranking	As of
Sabato's Crystal Ball	Lean R	November 4, 2002
New York Times	Tossup	October 14, 2002

==== Results ====
Colorado's 4th congressional district election, 2002
Party	Candidate	Votes	%
Republican	Marilyn Musgrave	115,359	54.9
Democratic	Stan Matsunaka	87,499	41.7
Libertarian	John Volz	7,097	3.4
Majority		27,860	13.3
Total votes		209,955	100.0
Republican hold			

== District 5 ==
2002 Colorado's 5th congressional district election
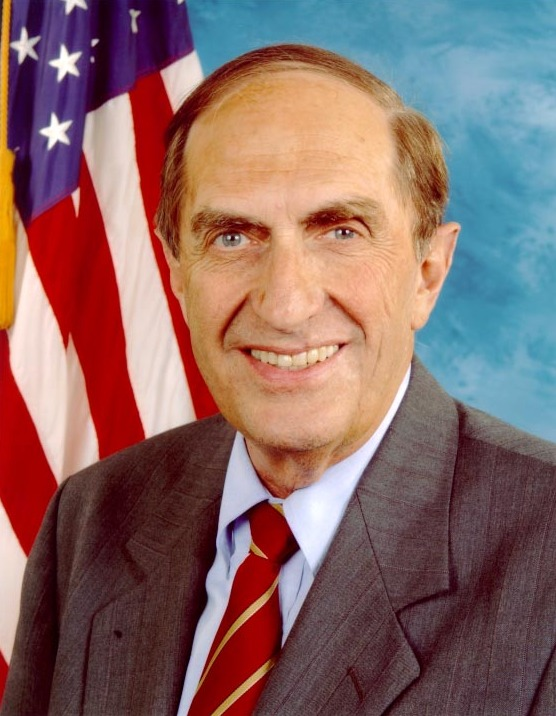

Nominee	Joel Hefley	Curtis Imrie	Biff Baker
Party	Republican	Democratic	Libertarian
Popular vote	128,118	45,587	10,972
Percentage	69.4%	24.8%	5.9%
- County results Hefley: 50–60% 60–70% 70–80% Imrie: 40–50%
U.S. Representative before election
Joel Hefley
Republican
Elected U.S. Representative
Joel Hefley
Republican

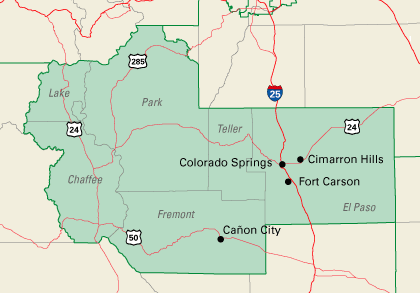

Incumbent Republican Joel Hefley, who had represented the district since 1987, ran for re-election. He was re-elected with 82.7% of the vote in 2000.

=== Republican primary ===
==== Candidates ====
===== Nominee =====
- Joel Hefley, incumbent U.S. Representative

==== Results ====
Republican primary results
Party	Candidate	Votes	%
Republican	Joel Hefley (incumbent)	26,133	100.0
Total votes		26,133	100.0

=== Democratic primary ===
==== Candidates ====
===== Nominee =====
- Curtis Imrie, radio personality, film-maker, sportsman and animal breeder

==== Results ====
Democratic primary results
Party	Candidate	Votes	%
Democratic	Curtis Imrie	4,108	100.0
Total votes		4,108	100.0

=== Libertarian primary ===
==== Candidates ====
===== Nominee =====
- Biff Baker, retired US Army Lieutenant Colonel, civilian consultant and contractor

=== General election ===
==== Endorsements ====
Joel Hefley (R)

Newspapers

- The Denver Post

==== Predictions ====
Source	Ranking	As of
Sabato's Crystal Ball	Safe R	November 4, 2002
New York Times	Safe R	October 14, 2002

==== Results ====
Colorado's 5th congressional district election, 2002
Party	Candidate	Votes	%
Republican	Joel Hefley (incumbent)	128,118	69.4
Democratic	Curtis Imrie	45,587	24.8
Libertarian	Biff Baker	10,972	5.9
Majority		82,531	44.7
Total votes		184,677	100.0
Republican hold			

== District 6 ==
2002 Colorado's 6th congressional district election
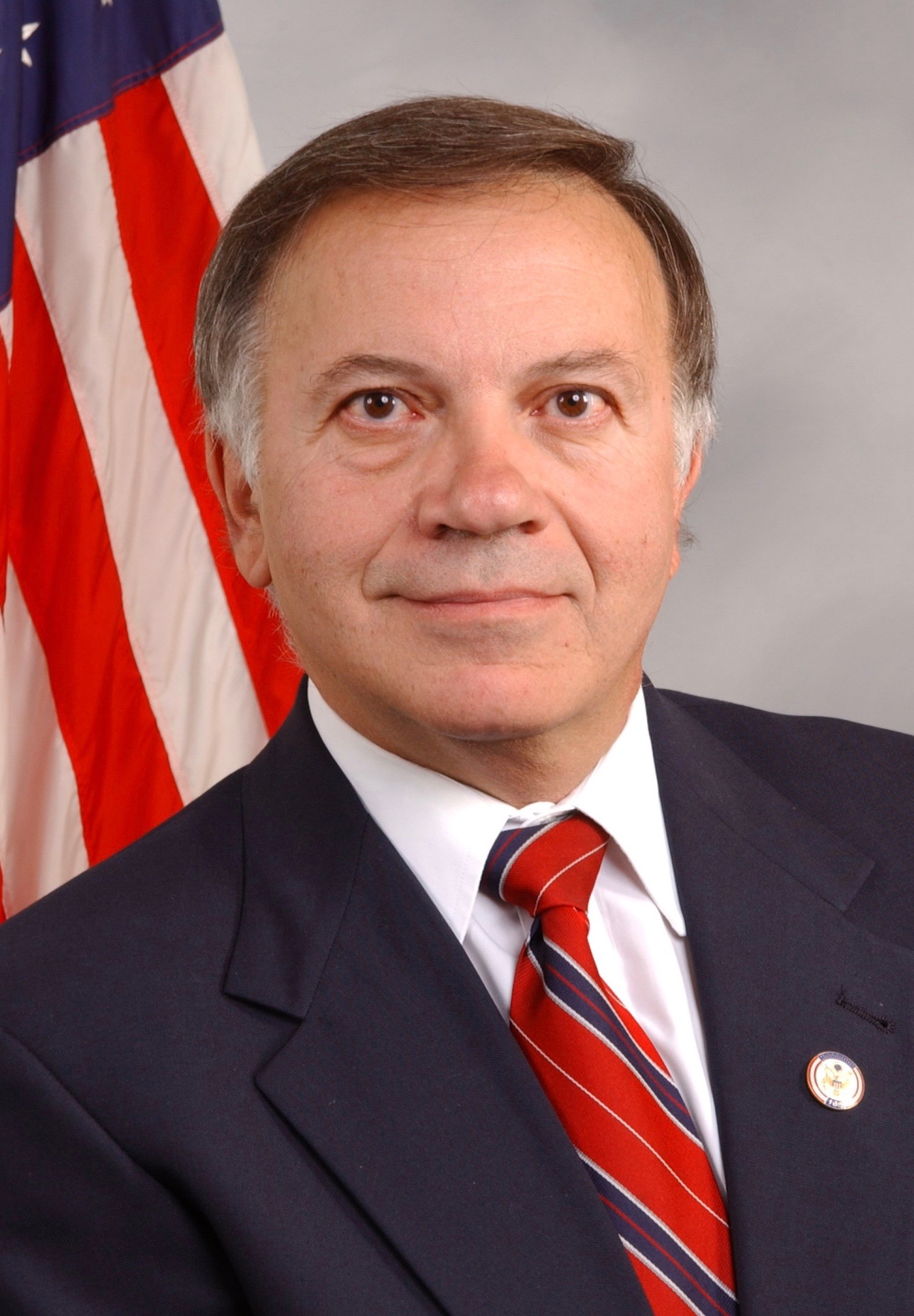

Nominee	Tom Tancredo	Lance Wright
Party	Republican	Democratic
Popular vote	158,851	71,327
Percentage	66.9%	30.0%
- County results Tancredo: 60–70% 70–80%
U.S. Representative before election
Tom Tancredo
Republican
Elected U.S. Representative
Tom Tancredo
Republican

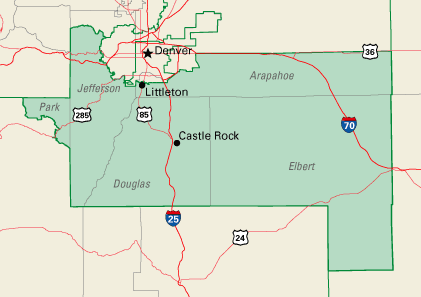

Incumbent Republican Tom Tancredo, who had represented the district since 1999, ran for re-election. He was re-elected with 53.9% of the vote in 2000.

=== Republican primary ===
==== Candidates ====
===== Nominee =====
- Tom Tancredo, incumbent U.S. Representative

==== Results ====
Republican primary results
Party	Candidate	Votes	%
Republican	Tom Tancredo (incumbent)	33,900	100.0
Total votes		33,900	100.0

=== Democratic primary ===
==== Candidates ====
===== Nominee =====
- Lance Wright, former Parker Town Council member

==== Results ====
Democratic primary results
Party	Candidate	Votes	%
Democratic	Lance Wright	11,475	100.0
Total votes		11,475	100.0

=== Libertarian primary ===
==== Candidates ====
===== Nominee =====
- Adam Katz, former Navy analyst

=== General election ===
==== Predictions ====
Source	Ranking	As of
Sabato's Crystal Ball	Safe R	November 4, 2002
New York Times	Safe R	October 14, 2002

==== Results ====
Colorado's 6th congressional district election, 2002
Party	Candidate	Votes	%
Republican	Tom Tancredo (incumbent)	158,851	66.9
Democratic	Lance Wright	71,327	30.0
Libertarian	Adam Katz	7,323	3.1
Majority		87,524	36.9
Total votes		237,501	100.0
Republican hold			

== District 7 ==
2002 Colorado's 7th congressional district election
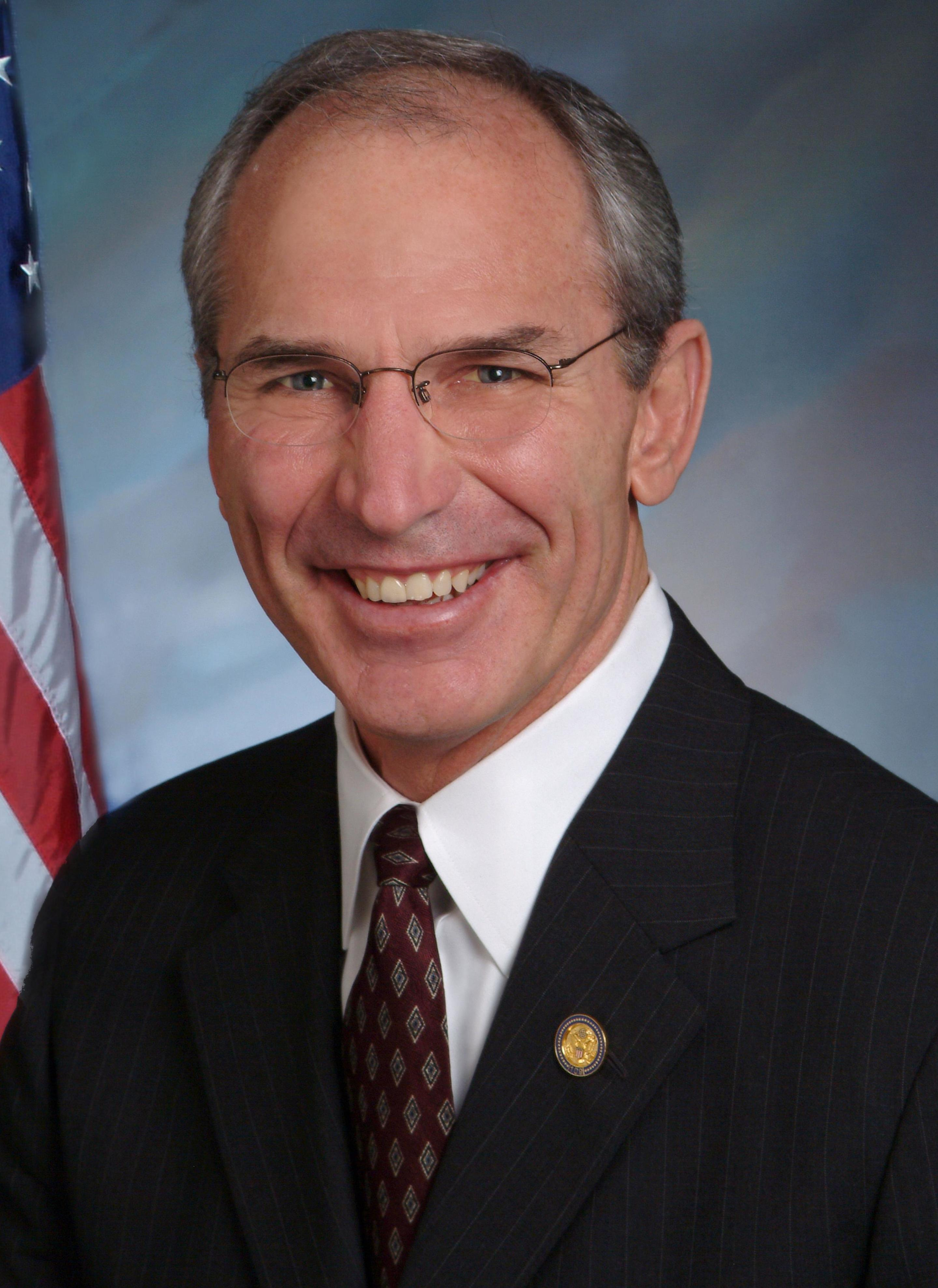

Nominee	Bob Beauprez	Mike Feeley
Party	Republican	Democratic
Popular vote	81,789	81,668
Percentage	47.3%	47.2%
- County results Beauprez: 40–50% Feeley: 40–50%
U.S. Representative before election
(None)
New district
Elected U.S. Representative
Bob Beauprez
Republican

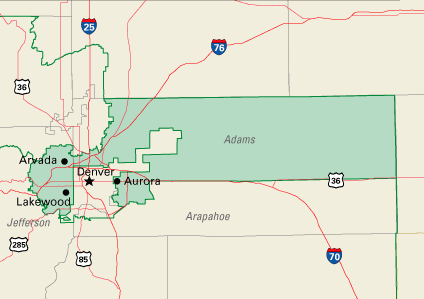

The new 7th district consisted of portions of Adams, Arapahoe, and Jefferson counties. The boundaries were drawn by a court after the state legislature failed to agree on a redistricting plan. It was drawn, as a "fair fight" district that was split roughly 50-50 between Democrats and Republicans.

=== Democratic primary ===
==== Candidates ====
===== Nominee =====
- Mike Feeley, former State Senate Minority Leader and candidate for Governor in 1998

===== Eliminated in primary =====
- Dave Thomas, Jefferson District Attorney and candidate for the District 2 in 1998

===== Withdrawn =====
- Bob Hagedorn, state senator

===== Declined =====
- Ed Perlmutter, state senator

==== Results ====
Democratic primary results
Party	Candidate	Votes	%
Democratic	Mike Feeley	11,265	56.5
Democratic	Dave Thomas	8,690	43.5
Total votes		19,955	100.0

=== Republican primary ===
==== Candidates ====
===== Nominee =====
- Bob Beauprez, chair of the Colorado Republican Party

===== Eliminated in primary =====
- Rick O'Donnell, director of Governor Bill Owens' policy and initiatives office
- Joe Rogers, incumbent Lieutenant Governor and nominee for the 1st District in 1996
- Sam H. Zakhem, former United States Ambassador to Bahrain, state senator and candidate for the 6th District in 1998

==== Results ====
Republican primary results
Party	Candidate	Votes	%
Republican	Bob Beauprez	10,172	38.2
Republican	Rick O'Donnell	8,213	30.8
Republican	Samir Zakhem	4,848	18.2
Republican	Joe Rogers	3,430	12.9
Total votes		26,663	100.0

=== Libertarian primary ===
==== Candidates ====
===== Nominee =====
- Bud Martin, retired USAF officer

=== Green primary ===
==== Candidates ====
===== Nominee =====
- Dave Chandler, desktop publishing business owner

=== Reform primary ===
==== Candidates ====
===== Nominee =====
- Victor Good, businessman, chair of the Colorado Reform Party and nominee for the 3rd district in 2000

=== General election ===
==== Debate ====
- Complete video of debate, October 17, 2002

==== Predictions ====
Source	Ranking	As of
Sabato's Crystal Ball	Lean D (flip)	November 4, 2002
New York Times	Tossup	October 14, 2002

==== Results ====
This was the closest House race in 2002.

Colorado's 7th congressional district election, 2002
Party	Candidate	Votes	%
Republican	Bob Beauprez	81,789	47.3
Democratic	Mike Feeley	81,668	47.2
Green	Dave Chandler	3,274	1.9
Reform	Victor Good	3,133	1.8
Libertarian	Bud Martin	2,906	1.7
Write-In	Stanford Andress	109	0.1
Majority		121	0.1
Total votes		237,501	100.0
Republican win (new seat)			
