= Stan Matsunaka =

American politician

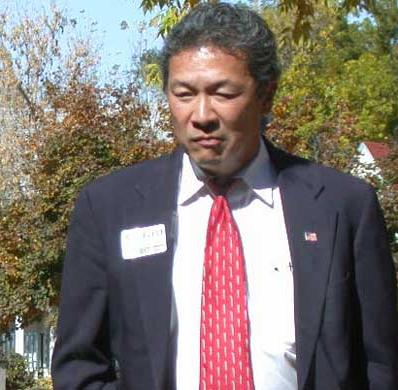

President of the Colorado Senate
- In office 2001–2002
- Preceded by: Ray Powers
- Succeeded by: John Andrews

Member of the Colorado Senate from the 15 district
- In office 1995–2003

Personal details
- Born: November 12, 1953 (age 73) Akron, Colorado
- Party: Democratic
- Education: Colorado State University (BS); University of San Diego (JD)

Stanley Toshi Matsunaka (born November 12, 1953) is a former Democratic member of the Colorado State Senate, serving from 1995 to 2003. He served as President of the Senate for two years. In both the 2002 and 2004 congressional elections, Matsunaka lost to Republican Marilyn Musgrave for Colorado's 4th congressional district.

== Early life and education ==
Matsunaka was born in Akron, Colorado, on November 12, 1953, to Mary and Harry Matsunaka. He graduated from Fort Morgan High School in 1971 then received a Bachelors of Science in biological sciences from Colorado State University in 1975 and a Juris Doctor from the University of San Diego in 1979.

== Political career ==
In 2002, Matsunaka ran against fellow state senator Musgrave for the open seat in the 4th District, which includes the cities of Greeley, Loveland, Longmont, and Fort Collins, as well much of the Colorado Eastern Plains; he lost to Musgrave 42%-55%.

In 2004, he again challenged Musgrave, now the incumbent, who had attracted controversy in the district for her sponsorship of the Federal Marriage Amendment. In addition to his accusation that Musgrave is a "one trick pony," Matsunaka also claimed that Musgrave had poor constituent services and did not give enough attention to the district's needs. This time, the election was far closer and was not decided until the last returns came in. Musgrave won by six points (51-45%) — the closest margin in the district since 1974. Matsunaka won two of the three biggest counties in the district — Larimer County (including Loveland and Fort Collins) and the district's share of Boulder County (including Longmont). However, Musgrave soundly defeated him in Weld County (including Greeley); he would have unseated Musgrave had he won there.

Despite the surprisingly close 2004 results, Matsunaka ruled out another run.

Now an attorney in private practice in Loveland, Matsunaka was an advisor to Ed Perlmutter's successful 2006 campaign for Colorado's 7th congressional district. He is married with three grown children, Melissa, Brian, and Kristi.
