= 2002 Colorado Secretary of State election =

- November 5, 2002
- Turnout: 49.45%
Nominee	Donetta Davidson	Anothony Martinez
Party	Republican	Democratic
Popular vote	789,004	513,085
Percentage	58.16%	37.82%
- County results Davidson: 40-50% 50–60% 60–70% 70–80% Martinez: 40–50% 50–60% 70–80%
Secretary of State before election
Donetta Davidson
Republican
Elected Secretary of State
Donetta Davidson
Republican

The 2002 Colorado Secretary of State election was held as a part of the 2002 general election on November 5, 2002. Republican nominee Donetta Davidson, the incumbent Secretary of State, defeated Democratic nominee Anothony Martinez by a 20 point margin.

== Republican primary ==
=== Candidates ===
- Donetta Davidson, incumbent Secretary of State of Colorado (1999–2005)

=== Results ===
Republican primary results
Party	Candidate	Votes	%
Republican	Donetta Davidson	179,723	100.00%
Total votes		179,723	100.00%

== Democratic primary ==
=== Canidates ===
- Anothony Martinez

=== Results ===
Democratic primary results
Party	Candidate	Votes	%
Democratic	Anothony Martinez	99,715	100.00%
Total votes		99,715	100.00%

== General election ==
=== Candidates ===
- Donetta Davidson, incumbent Secretary of State of Colorado (1999–2005)
- Anothony Martinez
- David Aitken
- Clyde J. Harkins

=== Results ===
2002 Colorado Secretary of State election results
Party	Candidate	Votes	%	±%
Republican	Donetta Davidson (incumbent)	789,004	58.16%	+2.69%
Democratic	Anothony Martinez	513,085	37.82%	±0%
Libertarian	David Aitken	43,169	3.18%	+0.48%
Constitution	Clyde J. Harkins	11,303	0.83%	+0.05%
Total votes		1,356,561	100.00%	
Republican hold				
