= Libertarian Party of Colorado =

State affiliate of the Libertarian Party

- Abbreviation: LPCO
- Chairperson: Keith Laube
- Founded: December 11, 1971
- Ideology: Libertarianism
- Colorado Senate: 0 / 35
- Colorado House of Representatives: 0 / 65
- U.S. Senate (Colorado): 0 / 2
- U.S. House of Representatives (Colorado): 0 / 8
- Other elected officials: 2 (June 2024)

Website
- lpcolorado.org

The Libertarian Party of Colorado (LPCO) is the Colorado affiliate of the national Libertarian Party (LP). As of September 2026, elected Libertarians in Colorado include Craig city councilman Paul James.

== History ==
The Libertarian Party was founded on December 11, 1971, in Colorado Springs. On June 17, 1972 the party had its first convention in Denver. There it adopted a platform that included gay rights and marriage legalization, as well as marijuana legalization, long before these ideas were widely adopted.

In 1994, the party's name was changed from the Colorado Libertarian Party to the Libertarian Party of Colorado. This was done so that candidates could appear on the ballot as Libertarian rather than Colorado Libertarian.

The party became a recognized minor party in 1998 after legislation was passed changing the requirements to being at least 1,000 registered voters or 5% of the vote in a statewide election.

The party had statewide primaries during the 2010 election, the first third-party to do so in Colorado since the Progressive Party in 1916. It was the only third party in the United States to run candidates in a majority of state legislative districts during the 2012 election.

In 2016, the party became the second Libertarian affiliate, after the Alaska Libertarian Party, to have at least 1% of the voters registered in it. This qualified their candidate, Lily Tang Williams for the U.S. Senate election to appear in debates.

In 2017, the party lobbied for HB 1313 to require law enforcement to publicly report civil asset forfeitures and restraining them from using a federal loophole with looser legal requirements for seizures. They were able to celebrate its passage in a bipartisan 81-19 vote; it was signed into law that June.

The party initially declined to give its ballot access for the 2024 presidential election to the national presidential ticket of Chase Oliver and Mike ter Maat and attempted to give their ballot line to independent candidates, Robert F. Kennedy Jr. and Nicole Shanahan, the following month. The press secretary of the national party submitted required paperwork recognizing the Oliver/ter Maat slate, which the Colorado Secretary of State accepted. Despite this, attached to the naming of Chase Oliver as the party's official candidacy, was a "partnership agreement" with RFK Jr's campaign.

On August 2, 2024, the LPC announced that they would begin publishing a new bi-monthly newsletter, The Clipboard, to report on news within both the state party and the broader libertarian party.

== Elected officials ==
Doug Carlsten served on the Brighton, Colorado city council in the 1990s. Doug Anderson, a member of the party, was elected to the Denver election commission in 1987, and Lakewood city council in 2005, in nonpartisan elections. Bob Dempsey was elected the San Miguel County Coroner as a Libertarian. In 2022 Aron Lam was elected mayor of the town of Keenesburg with over 60% of the vote.

== Liberty Pledge strategy ==
=== Inciting incident ===
In the election of 2022, the new 8th Congressional District went to Democratic Rep. Yadira Caraveo with 48.4% over Republican State Sen. Barbara Kirkmeyer with 47.7% of the vote. With this victory, the majority of Congressional Districts would now be led by Democratic Party representatives. That election was a sweep for the Democratic Party, with all five districts up for a vote that year going to their candidates. The Libertarian candidate, Richard "Dan" Ward, received nearly six times the difference between the major party candidates with 3.9% of the vote, with some to arguing that Kirkmeyer would have otherwise won.

=== Formulation ===
The leverage displayed by this and other votes was used the following year to acquire the unprecedented agreement by the Republican Party to run candidates that met the Libertarian Party of Colorado's standards as sufficiently "strong liberty minded" in exchange for withdrawing Libertarian Party candidates from those races. This was largely determined by a detailed policy questionnaire from the LPCO called the Liberty Pledge. This questionnaire included over a dozen items, and differed depending on whether seeking state or national office.

=== Implimentation ===
A number of Republicans were announced at the 2024 LPCO convention to have signed the Liberty Pledge in exchange for removing competition from LPCO candidates. On the local/state level this included the Weld County Commissioner (District 3) candidate Lynette Peppler, and candidates for Colorado state House of Representatives were Rebecca Keltie (HD16), Gwen Henderson (HD24); Nathan Butler (HD26), Carlos Barron (HD48), and former District 63 Representative Dan Woog (HD19). On the national level the signatories announced were the candidates for United States House of Representatives Valdamar Archuleta (CD1), and Robin Heid (CD3). In the race for the 3rd Congressional District, Lauren Boebert agreed to withdraw from the primary and pursue nomination to the 4th District instead. Also on the national level, Steve Yurash, the Center Party candidate for the 2nd Congressional District, demonstrated the offer was not exclusive to Republicans by signing the pledge.

They were joined later that cycle by the Republican Party primary candidate for U.S. House of Representatives in the 3rd District Ron Hanks. His primary loss to Jeff Hurd, however, kept the Liberty Pledge from becoming operative.

A modified version was also signed by state Representative Gabe Evans (HD48), who would be challenging Yadira Caraveo for the second term of the 8th Congressional District. Candidate for state representative Ryan Gonzalez (HD50), while unwilling to sign the Liberty Pledge, recorded a video for the LPCO's state convention in which he "agreed with everything in their pledge and promised to vote their way on each item listed." The Liberty Pledge was also signed by state representative Ken DeGraaf (HD22) even though he expected little electoral resistance simply because he believed in its principles.

=== Results ===
While many races were not close enough for the LPCO withdrawal of a candidate to make a difference, in some cases it seems to have made a clear difference. In HD50 Ryan Gonzalez won a seat that had been held by Democrats since 2005 by 557 votes, reversing the prior election's 330-vote defeat to Mary Young (49.2% to 47.3%, with a Libertarian pulling 3.5%). Dan Woog took HD19 by 110 votes, a seat he had lost the prior election as an incumbent by 1,467 votes (3%). Rebecca Keltie claimed victory in HD16 over Steph Vigil by only three votes.

Carlos Barron took the seat vacated by Gabe Evans in House District 48 unopposed. Weld County Commissioner for District 3 went to Lynette Peppler. It appears to have been unopposed, but there is some inconsistency in the record.

The 8th Congressional District race, as a "toss-up," became a focal point of national scrutiny, breaking prior records of spending on Colorado's U.S. Congress elections and exceeding the prior race by over 150% ($30 million versus the prior $19 million). Gabe Evans was ultimately able to beat Yadira Carveo by 2,448 votes (less than a third of the Libertarian votes the prior year).

== Voter registration ==
Year	RV.	%	Change
1984	207	(0.02%)	Steady
1988	1,026	(0.05%)	Steady

== See also ==
- List of state Libertarian Parties in the United States
