= 2008 United States House of Representatives elections in Colorado =

- November 4, 2008

All 7 Colorado seats to the United States House of Representatives
	Majority party	Minority party
Party	Democratic	Republican
Last election	4 seats, 54.12%	3 seats, 40.53%
Seats before	4	3
Seats won	5	2
Seat change	▲1	▼1
Popular vote	1,259,768	990,870
Percentage	55.16%	43.38%
Swing	▲1.04%	▲2.85%

Democratic
50–60%
60–70%
70–80%
80–90%
Republican
40–50%
50–60%
60–70%
70–80%

The 2008 congressional elections in Colorado were held on November 4, 2008, to determine who will represent the state of Colorado in the United States House of Representatives, coinciding with the presidential and senatorial elections. Representatives are elected for two-year terms; those elected served in the 111th Congress from January 3, 2009, until January 3, 2011.

Colorado had seven seats in the House, apportioned according to the 2000 United States census. Its 2007-2008 congressional delegation consisted of four Democrats and three Republicans. After the elections, it consisted of five Democrats and two Republicans. District 4 changed party (from Republican to Democratic), which was the only district CQ Politics had forecasted to be at some risk for the incumbent party.

The Primary election was held August 12, 2008.

== Overview ==
=== Statewide ===
Party	Candidates	Votes		Seats		
Party	Candidates	No.	%	No.	+/–	%
Democratic	7	1,259,768	55.16	5	▲1	71.43
Republican	7	990,870	43.38	2	▼1	28.57
Libertarian	1	12,136	0.61	0	Steady	0.0
Green	1	10,031	0.50	0	Steady	0.0
Constitution	1	8,894	0.44	0	Steady	0.0
Unity	1	2,176	0.11	0	Steady	0.0
Write-in	2	56	0.00	0	Steady	0.0
Total	20	2,283,931	100.0	7	Steady	100.0

Popular vote
Democratic	55.16%
Republican	43.38%
Libertarian	0.61%
Other	0.85%

House seats
Democratic	71.43%
Republican	28.57%

=== By district ===
Results of the 2008 United States House of Representatives elections in Colorado by district:

District	Democratic		Republican		Others		Total		Result
District	Votes	%	Votes	%	Votes	%	Votes	%	Result
District 1	203,755	71.94%	67,345	23.78%	12,146	4.29%	283,246	100.0%	Democratic hold
District 2	215,571	62.60%	116,591	33.86%	12,202	3.54%	344,364	100.0%	Democratic hold
District 3	203,455	61.61%	126,762	38.39%	0	0.00%	330,217	100.0%	Democratic hold
District 4	187,347	56.20%	146,028	43.80%	0	0.00%	333,375	100.0%	Democratic Gain
District 5	113,025	37.04%	183,178	60.03%	8,939	2.93%	305,142	100.0%	Republican hold
District 6	162,639	39.33%	250,877	60.67%	0	0.00%	413,516	100.0%	Republican hold
District 7	173,931	63.48%	100,055	36.52%	0	0.00%	273,986	100.0%	Democratic hold
Total	1,259,768	55.16%	990,870	43.38%	33,287	1.46%	2,283,846	100.0%	

== District 1 ==
2008 Colorado's 1st congressional district election
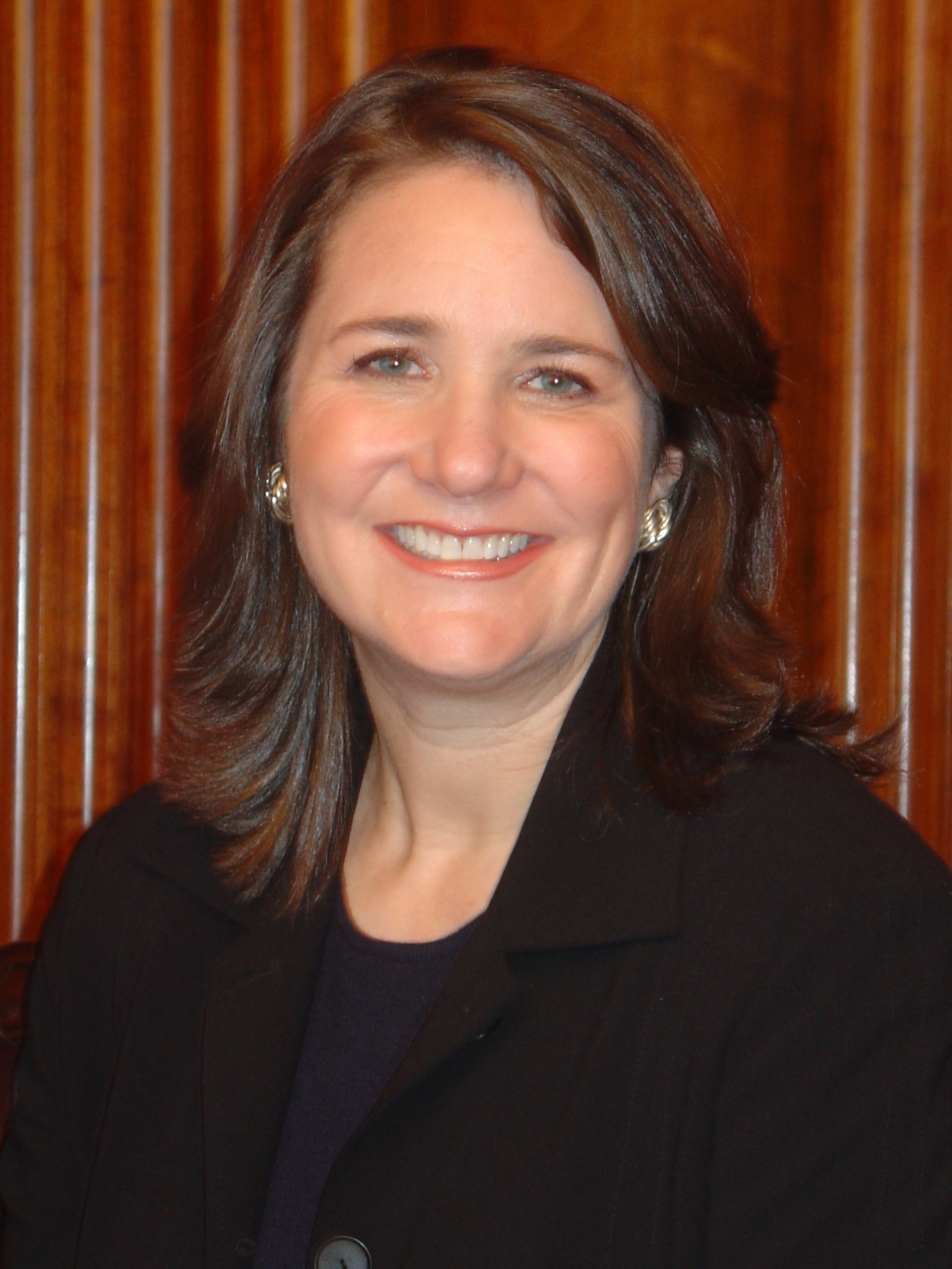

Nominee	Diana DeGette	George Lilly
Party	Democratic	Republican
Popular vote	203,756	67,346
Percentage	71.9%	23.7%
- County results DeGette: 50–60% 70–80% Lilly: 60–70%
U.S. Representative before election
Diana DeGette
Democratic
Elected U.S. Representative
Diana DeGette
Democratic

Incumbent Democrat Diana DeGette, who had represented this Denver based district since 1997, ran for re-election. She was re-elected with 79.8% of the vote in 2006 and the district had a PVI of D+18.

=== Democratic primary ===
==== Candidates ====
===== Nominee =====
- Diana DeGette, incumbent U.S. Representative

==== Results ====
Democratic primary results
Party	Candidate	Votes	%
Democratic	Diana DeGette (incumbent)	35,804	100.0
Total votes		35,804	100.0

=== Republican primary ===
==== Candidates ====
===== Nominee =====
- George Lilly, sales and marketing representative, Constitution nominee for state representative in 2000 and for this seat in 2002 & 2004

===== Eliminated in primary =====
- Charles Crain

==== Results ====
Republican primary results
Party	Candidate	Votes	%
Republican	George Lilly	6,300	58.2
Republican	Charles Crain	4,533	41.8
Total votes		10,833	100.0

=== General election ===
==== Endorsements ====
Diana DeGette (D)

Labor unions

- AFL-CIO

Organizations

- Citizens for Global Solutions
- Planned Parenthood Action Fund

Newspapers

- The Denver Post
George Lilly (R)

Organizations

- Republican Liberty Caucus

==== Predictions ====
Source	Ranking	As of
The Cook Political Report	Safe D	November 6, 2008
Rothenberg	Safe D	November 2, 2008
Sabato's Crystal Ball	Safe D	November 6, 2008
Real Clear Politics	Safe D	November 7, 2008
CQ Politics	Safe D	November 6, 2008

==== Results ====
Colorado's 1st congressional district election, 2008
Party	Candidate	Votes	%
Democratic	Diana DeGette (incumbent)	203,756	71.9
Republican	George Lilly	67,346	23.8
Libertarian	Martin Buchanan	12,136	4.3
Write-In	Gary Swing	11	0.0
Majority		136,410	48.2
Valid ballots		283,249	92.8
Invalid or blank votes		21,844	7.2
Turnout		305,093	88.7
Registered electors		343,812	
Democratic hold			

==== Finances ====
===== Campaigns =====
Candidate (party)	Raised	Spent	Cash on hand
Diana DeGette (D)	$808,491	$925,776	$106,102
George Lilly (R)	$13,746	$14,060	$9
Martin Buchanan (L)	Unreported		

===== Outside Spending =====
Candidate (party)	Supported	Opposed
Diana DeGette (D)	$2,455	$0
George Lilly (R)	$0	$0
Martin Buchanan (L)	$0	$0

== District 2 ==
2008 Colorado's 2nd congressional district election
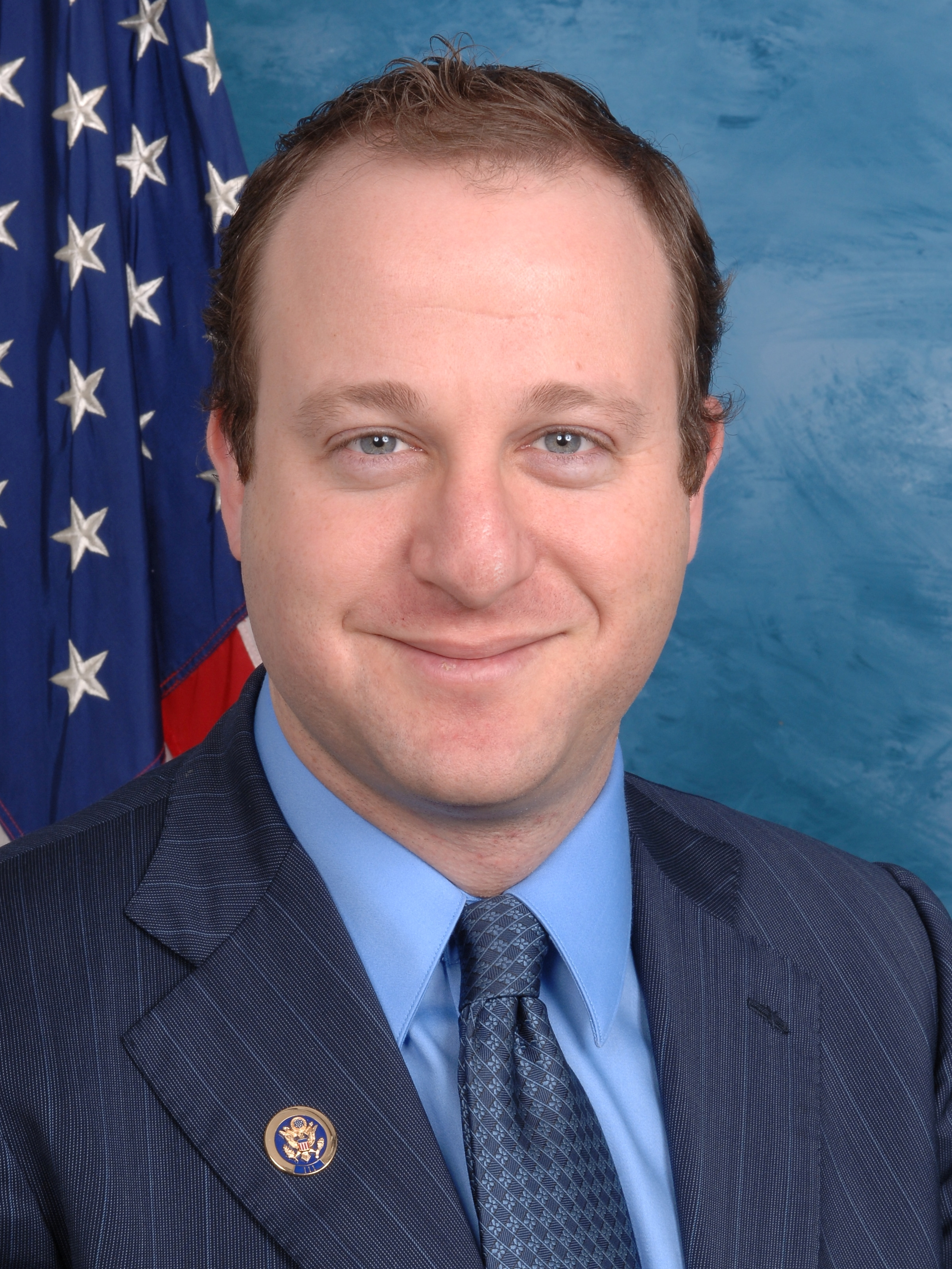

Nominee	Jared Polis	Scott Starin
Party	Democratic	Republican
Popular vote	215,602	116,619
Percentage	62.6%	33.9%
- County results Polis: 50–60% 60–70% 70–80% Starin: 40–50%
U.S. Representative before election
Mark Udall
Democratic
Elected U.S. Representative
Jared Polis
Democratic

Incumbent Democrat Mark Udall, who had represented the district, centred around heavily Democratic Boulder, since 1999, ran for the Senate following the retirement of Senator Wayne Allard, leaving this an open seat. He was re-elected with 68.2% of the vote in 2006 and the district had a PVI of D+8.

=== Democratic primary ===
==== Candidates ====
===== Nominee =====
- Jared Polis, Colorado Board of Education President

===== Eliminated in primary =====
- Joan Fitz-Gerald, former President of the Colorado Senate
- Will Shafroth, Colorado Conservation Trust Director

===== Declined =====
- Alice Madden, Majority Leader of the state house
- Ron Tupa, state senator
- Mark Udall, incumbent U.S. Representative

==== Endorsements ====
Joan Fitz-Gerald

Organizations

- EMILYs List
Will Shafroth

Newspapers

- Rocky Mountain News

==== Results ====
Democratic primary results
Party	Candidate	Votes	%
Democratic	Jared Polis	20,493	41.7
Democratic	Joan Fitz-Gerald	18,599	37.8
Democratic	Will Shafroth	10,075	20.5
Total votes		49,167	100.0

=== Republican primary ===
==== Candidates ====
===== Nominee =====
- Scott Starin, aerospace engineer

===== Declined =====
- Tom Stone, former Eagle County Commissioner

==== Results ====
Republican primary results
Party	Candidate	Votes	%
Republican	Scott Starin	19,293	100.0
Total votes		19,293	100.0

=== Green primary ===
==== Candidates ====
===== Nominee =====
- J. A. Calhoun, nominee for this seat in 2006

===== Declined =====
- Mark Ruzzin, Mayor of Boulder

=== Unity primary ===
==== Candidates ====
===== Nominee =====
- Bill Hammons, founder and National Chairman of the Unity Party of America

=== General election ===
==== Endorsements ====
Jared Polis (D)

Labor unions

- AFL-CIO

Newspapers

- The Denver Post

==== Predictions ====
Source	Ranking	As of
The Cook Political Report	Safe D	November 6, 2008
Rothenberg	Safe D	November 2, 2008
Sabato's Crystal Ball	Safe D	November 6, 2008
Real Clear Politics	Safe D	November 7, 2008
CQ Politics	Safe D	November 6, 2008

==== Results ====
Colorado's 2nd congressional district election, 2008
Party	Candidate	Votes	%
Democratic	Jared Polis	215,602	62.6
Republican	Scott Starin	116,619	33.9
Green	J. A. Calhoun	10,031	2.9
Unity	Bill Hammons	2,176	0.6
Majority		98,983	28.7
Valid ballots		344,428	93.5
Invalid or blank votes		23,805	6.5
Turnout		368,233	92.5
Registered electors		398,114	
Democratic hold			

==== Finances ====
===== Campaigns =====
Candidate (party)	Raised	Spent	Cash on hand
Jared Polis (D)	$7,353,034	$7,323,502	$29,533
Scott Starin (R)	$88,757	$90,426	$24
J. A. Calhoun (G)	Unreported		
William Hammons (U)	$22,467	$22,247	$164

===== Outside Spending =====
Candidate (party)	Supported	Opposed
Jared Polis (D)	$0	$42,573
Scott Starin (R)	$4,768	$0
J. A. Calhoun (G)	$0	$0
William Hammons (U)	$0	$0

== District 3 ==
2008 Colorado's 3rd congressional district election
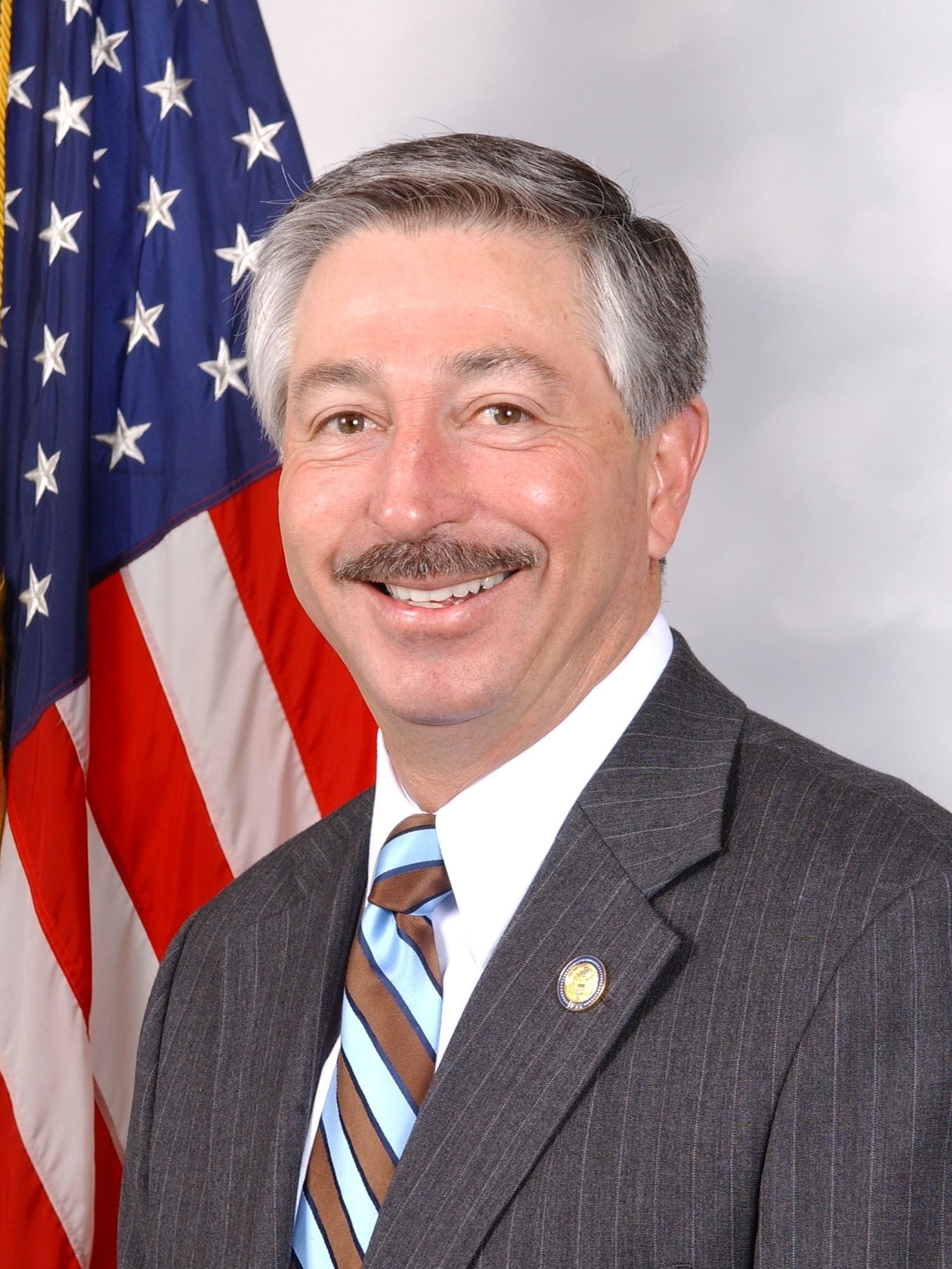

Nominee	John Salazar	Wayne Wolf
Party	Democratic	Republican
Popular vote	203,457	126,762
Percentage	61.6%	38.4%
- Salazar: 50–60% 60–70% 70–80% 80–90% >90% Wolf: 50–60% 60–70% 70–80% Tie: 50–60% No Votes
U.S. Representative before election
John Salazar
Democratic
Elected U.S. Representative
John Salazar
Democratic

Incumbent Democrat John Salazar, who had represented the conservative, west Colorado district since 2005, ran for re-election. He was re–elected with 61.6% of the vote in 2006 and the district had a PVI of R+6.

=== Democratic primary ===
==== Candidates ====
===== Nominee =====
- John Salazar, incumbent U.S. Representative

==== Results ====
Democratic primary results
Party	Candidate	Votes	%
Democratic	John Salazar (incumbent)	22,192	100.0
Total votes		22,192	100.0

=== Republican primary ===
==== Candidates ====
===== Nominee =====
- Wayne Wolf, rancher and Delta County commissioner

===== Declined =====
- Josh Penry, state senator
- Ellen Roberts, state representative
- Scott Tipton, businessman and nominee for this seat in 2006 (running for state representative)
- Al White, state representative

==== Results ====
Republican primary results
Party	Candidate	Votes	%
Republican	Wayne Wolf	24,263	100.0
Total votes		24,263	100.0

=== General election ===
==== Endorsements ====
John Salazar (D)

Labor unions

- AFL-CIO

Organizations

- Blue Dog Coalition

Newspapers

- The Denver Post

==== Predictions ====
Source	Ranking	As of
The Cook Political Report	Safe D	November 6, 2008
Rothenberg	Safe D	November 2, 2008
Sabato's Crystal Ball	Safe D	November 6, 2008
Real Clear Politics	Safe D	November 7, 2008
CQ Politics	Safe D	November 6, 2008

==== Results ====
Colorado's 3rd congressional district election, 2008
Party	Candidate	Votes	%
Democratic	John Salazar (incumbent)	203,457	61.6
Republican	Wayne Wolf	126,762	38.4
Majority		76,695	23.2
Valid ballots		330,219	96.4
Invalid or blank votes		12,248	3.6
Turnout		342,467	89.5
Registered electors		382,649	
Democratic hold			

==== Finances ====
===== Campaigns =====
Candidate (party)	Raised	Spent	Cash on hand
John Salazar (D)	$1,335,166	$901,272	$464,754
Wayne Wolf (R)	$21,704	$21,669	$33

===== Outside Spending =====
Candidate (party)	Supported	Opposed
John Salazar (D)	$1,051	$0
Wayne Wolf (R)	$0	$0

== District 4 ==
2008 Colorado's 4th congressional district election
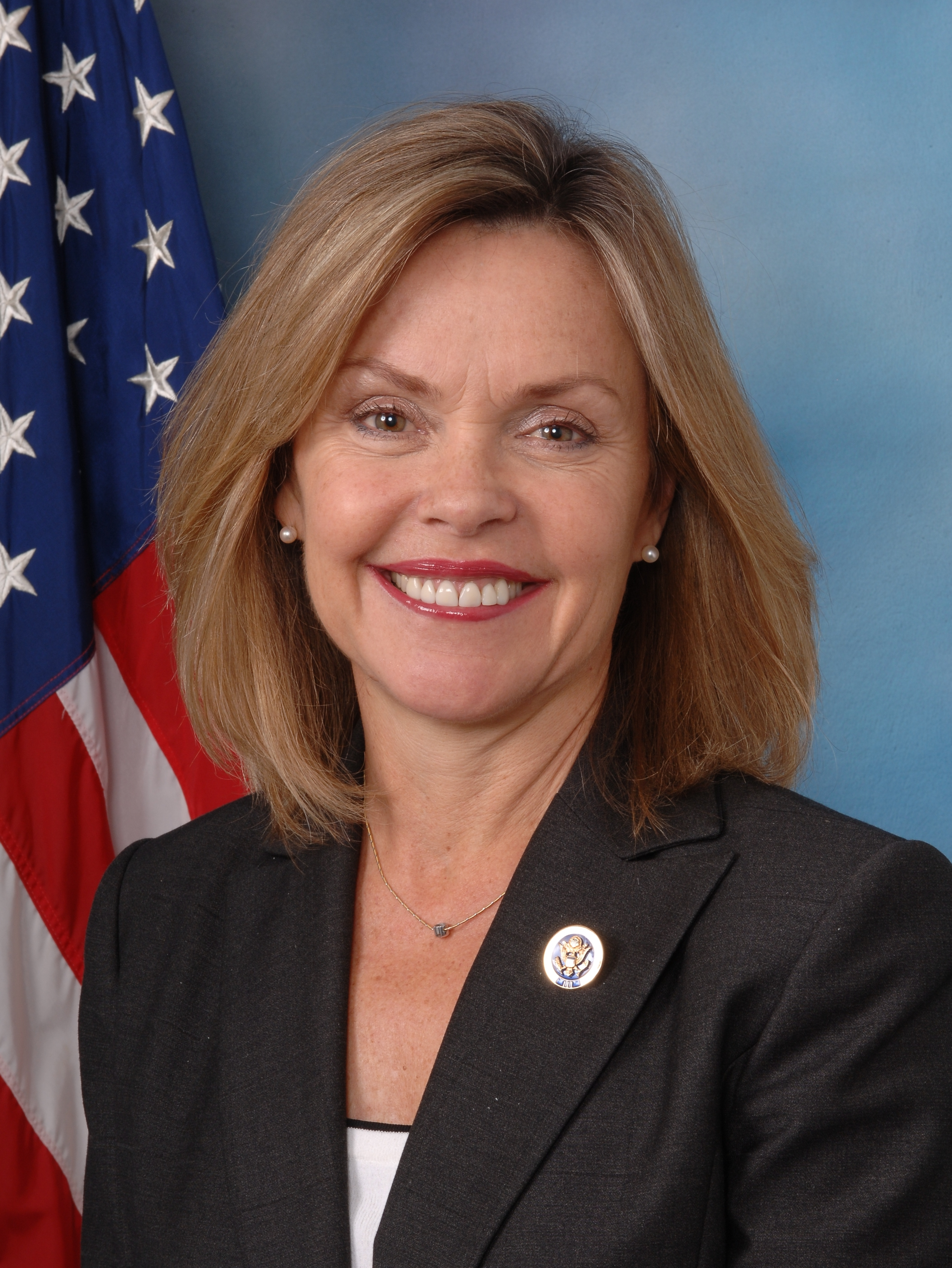

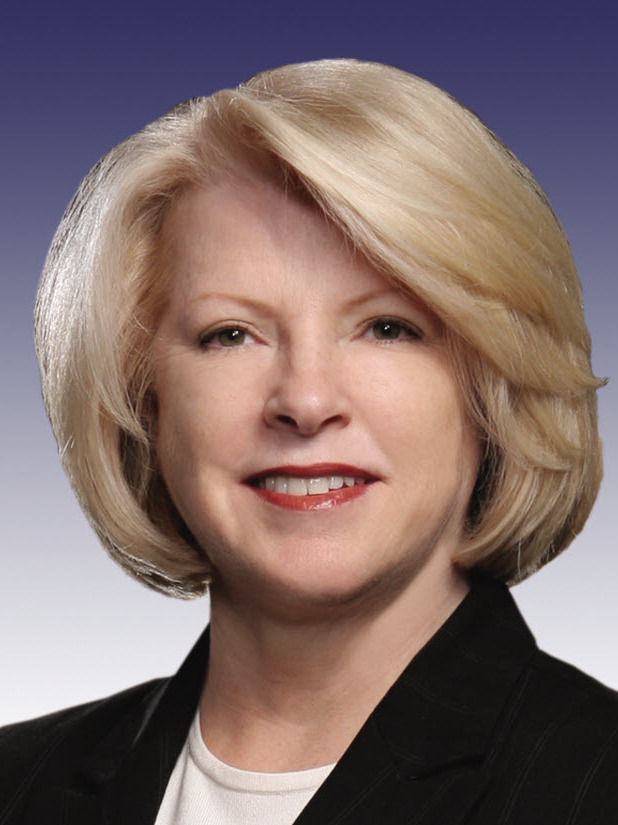
Nominee	Betsy Markey	Marilyn Musgrave
Party	Democratic	Republican
Popular vote	187,348	146,030
Percentage	56.2%	43.8%
- Markey: 50–60% 60–70% 70–80% 80–90% Musgrave: 50–60% 60–70% 70–80% 80–90% >90% Tie: 50–60% No Votes
U.S. Representative before election
Marilyn Musgrave
Republican
Elected U.S. Representative
Betsy Markey
Democratic

Incumbent Republican Marilyn Musgrave, who had represented this conservative east Colorado-based district since 2003, ran for re-election. She was re-elected with 45.6% of the vote in 2006 and the district had a PVI of R+9. Musgrave, a conservative known for her staunch opposition to gay marriage, won in 2006 by winning a plurality (46%) of the vote against Angie Paccione and a strong Reform Party challenge from Eric Eidsness, who managed to garner 11% of the vote. That, along with her 51% showing in 2004 despite George W. Bush winning 58% of the vote in this eastern Colorado district that includes the Fort Collins area, made her seem vulnerable in 2008.

=== Republican primary ===
==== Candidates ====
===== Nominee =====
- Marilyn Musgrave, incumbent U.S. Representative

==== Results ====
Republican primary results
Party	Candidate	Votes	%
Republican	Marilyn Musgrave (incumbent)	31,822	100.0
Total votes		31,822	100.0

=== Democratic primary ===
Democrats suffered a setback earlier when State Senator Brandon Shaffer suddenly dropped out, citing his party's failure to clear the field. Eidsness switched parties again, having switched from Republican to Reform Party the year prior, and became a Democrat, which could have fuelled a potential rematch with Musgrave in 2008. 2006 nominee Angie Paccione briefly launched a campaign as well, but left the race in September 2007.

==== Candidates ====
===== Nominee =====
- Betsy Markey, businesswoman and regional director for Senator Ken Salazar

===== Withdrawn =====
- Eric Eidsness, former EPA Assistant Administrator for Water and Reform nominee for this seat in 2006
- Angie Paccione, former state representative and nominee for this seat in 2006
- Brandon Shaffer, state senator

===== Declined =====
- Bill Long, Bent County Commissioner
- Jim Riesberg, state representative

==== Results ====
Democratic primary results
Party	Candidate	Votes	%
Democratic	Betsy Markey	19,010	100.0
Total votes		19,010	100.0

=== General election ===
==== Campaign ====
Musgrave launched a negative advertisement, attacking Markey over the business of Syscom Systems, the data-processing equipment company run by Markey and her husband. The Musgrave ad was called "highly misleading" by a Denver television station that investigated the facts. On October 24, the National Republican Congressional Committee abandoned Marilyn Musgrave's 2008 re-election campaign, believing the race was lost. This decision was based solely on Musgrave's poor poll numbers.

==== Endorsements ====
Marilyn Musgrave (R)

Organizations

- Eagle Forum
Betsy Markey (D)

Labor unions

- AFL-CIO

Organizations

- Democratic Congressional Campaign Committee "Red to Blue" Program
- EMILYs List
- Planned Parenthood Action Fund

Newspapers

- The Denver Post

==== Polling ====
Poll source	Date(s) administered	Sample size (Note: Key: A – all adults RV – registered voters LV – likely voters V – unclear)	Margin of error	Marilyn Musgrave (R)	Betsy Markey (D)	Undecided
SurveyUSA (Roll Call)	August 22–24, 2008	618 (LV)	±4.0%	43%	50%	7%

==== Predictions ====
Source	Ranking	As of
The Cook Political Report	Tossup	November 6, 2008
Rothenberg	Lean D (flip)	November 2, 2008
Sabato's Crystal Ball	Lean D (flip)	November 6, 2008
Real Clear Politics	Tossup	November 7, 2008
CQ Politics	Lean D (flip)	November 6, 2008

==== Results ====
After her defeat, Musgrave would not comment on the election results with the media, nor would she concede the race or contact Markey to congratulate her. She also did not thank her campaign staff for their efforts. She later recorded a robocall for Republican Georgia senator Saxby Chambliss, saying that she was defeated by "leftist special interests" who "suppressed the truth with vicious attacks and lies."

Colorado's 4th congressional district election, 2008
Party	Candidate	Votes	%
Democratic	Betsy Markey	187,348	56.2
Republican	Marilyn Musgrave (incumbent)	146,030	43.8
Majority		41,318	12.4
Valid ballots		333,378	95.3
Invalid or blank votes		16,565	4.7
Turnout		349,943	91.3
Registered electors		383,292	
Democratic gain from Republican			

==== Finances ====
===== Campaigns =====
Candidate (party)	Raised	Spent	Cash on hand
Marilyn Musgrave (R)	$2,862,907	$2,869,703	$62,132
Betsy Markey (D)	$2,893,744	$2,872,153	$21,591

===== Outside Spending =====
Candidate (party)	Supported	Opposed
Marilyn Musgrave (R)	$170,281	$1,505,831
Betsy Markey (D)	$580,289	$897,027

== District 5 ==
2008 Colorado's 5th congressional district election
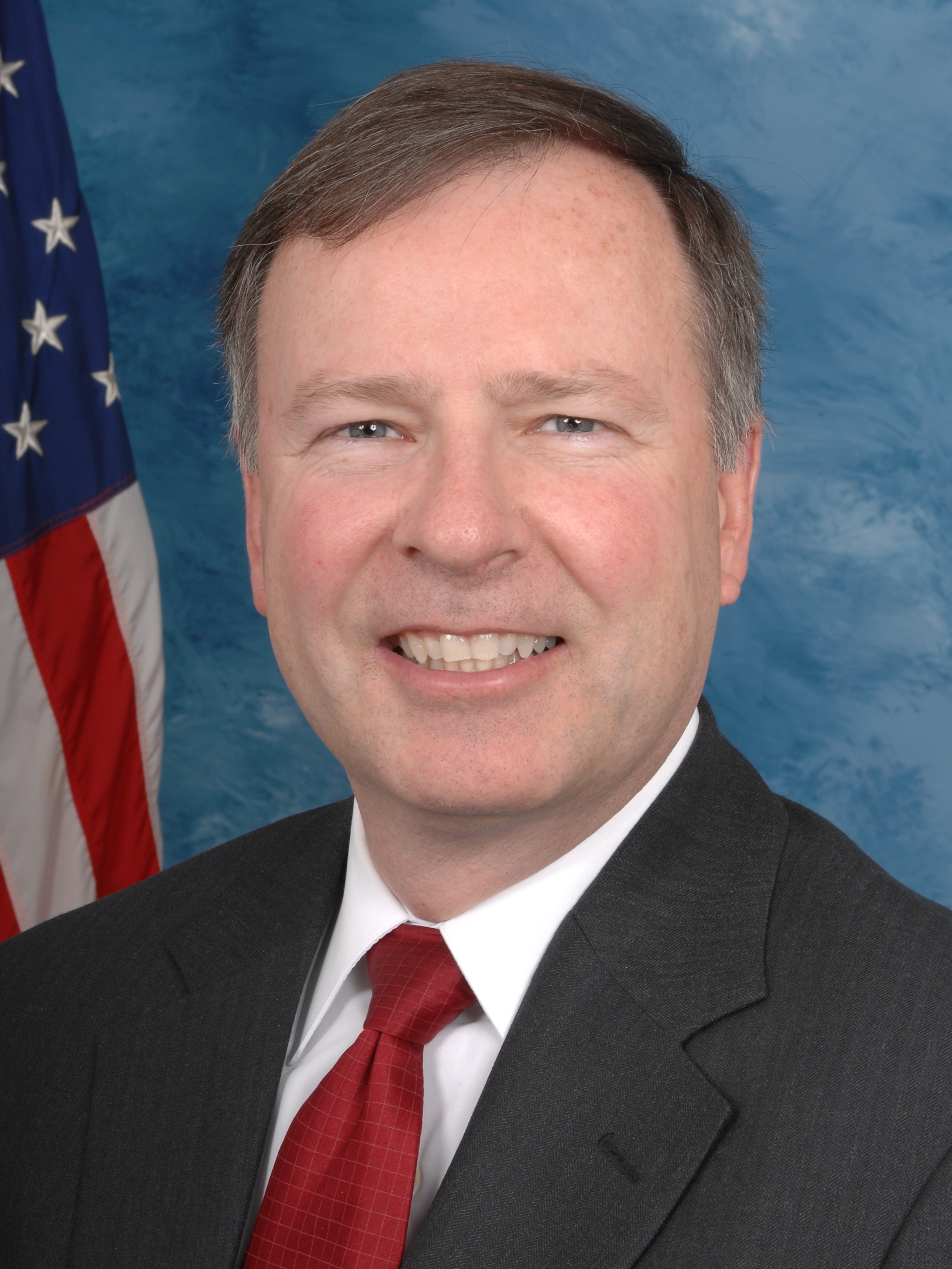

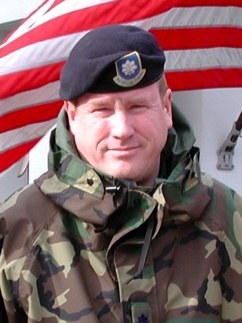
Nominee	Doug Lamborn	Hal Bidlack
Party	Republican	Democratic
Popular vote	183,179	113,027
Percentage	60.0%	37.0%
- County results Lamborn: 50–60% 60–70% Bidlack: 50–60%
U.S. Representative before election
Doug Lamborn
Republican
Elected U.S. Representative
Doug Lamborn
Republican

Incumbent Republican Doug Lamborn, who had represented this conservative district based in Colorado Springs and its suburbs district since 2007, ran for re-election. He was elected with 59.6% of the vote in 2006 and the district had a PVI of R+16.

=== Republican primary ===
==== Campaign ====
Lamborn had received bad press when two constituents accused him of making a threatening phone call in response to a critical letter they wrote. He won against Jeff Crank and Bentley Rayburn, more moderate Republicans who had also run in 2006, in the Republican primary. In 2006, Lamborn had narrowly won a nasty multi-candidate primary with 27% of the vote, despite previous representative Joel Hefley's endorsement of Crank, citing Lamborn's "sleazy" campaign. Crank and Rayburn thus came to a gentleman's agreement - they would jointly conduct a poll of the primary, and whoever of the two of them was in third place would drop out and endorse the other, so as to have a better chance of defeating Lamborn. Rayburn came third in the poll, but he refused to drop out.

==== Candidates ====
===== Nominee =====
- Doug Lamborn, incumbent U.S. Representative

===== Eliminated in primary =====
- Jeff Crank, Greater Colorado Springs Chamber of Commerce vice president and candidate for this seat in 2006
- Bentley Rayburn, United States Air Force Major General and candidate for this seat in 2006

==== Endorsements ====
Jeff Crank

U.S. representatives

- Joel Hefley, U.S. representative from Colorado's 5th congressional district (1987–2007)

==== Results ====
Republican primary results
Party	Candidate	Votes	%
Republican	Doug Lamborn (incumbent)	24,995	44.0
Republican	Jeff Crank	16,794	29.6
Republican	Bentley Rayburn	14,986	26.4
Total votes		56,775	100.0

=== Democratic primary ===
==== Candidates ====
===== Nominee =====
- Hal Bidlack, retired United States Air Force Lieutenant colonel and National Security Council aide

===== Declined =====
- John Morse, state senator

==== Results ====
Democratic primary results
Party	Candidate	Votes	%
Democratic	Hal Bidlack	13,146	100.0
Total votes		13,146	100.0

=== General election ===
==== Endorsements ====
Doug Lamborn (R)

Organizations

- Eagle Forum
Hal Bidlack (D)

Newspapers

- The Denver Post

==== Predictions ====
Source	Ranking	As of
The Cook Political Report	Safe R	November 6, 2008
Rothenberg	Safe R	November 2, 2008
Sabato's Crystal Ball	Safe R	November 6, 2008
Real Clear Politics	Safe R	November 7, 2008
CQ Politics	Safe R	November 6, 2008

==== Results ====
Amid worries of vulnerability, Lamborn won the general election by a 59%-41% margin, becoming the highest vote getter for a GOP Congressional candidate in the state in the 2008 cycle.

Colorado's 5th congressional district election, 2008
Party	Candidate	Votes	%
Republican	Doug Lamborn (incumbent)	183,179	60.0
Democratic	Hal Bidlack	113,027	37.0
American Constitution	Brian Scott	8,894	2.9
Write-In	Richard Hand	45	0.0
Majority		70,152	23.0
Valid ballots		305,145	93.7
Invalid or blank votes		20,371	6.3
Turnout		325,516	90.5
Registered electors		359,874	
Republican hold			

==== Finances ====
===== Campaigns =====
Candidate (party)	Raised	Spent	Cash on hand
Doug Lamborn (R)	$611,755	$593,491	$46,469
Hal Bidlack (D)	$241,725	$240,738	$986
Brian Scott (C)	Unreported		

===== Outside Spending =====
Candidate (party)	Supported	Opposed
Doug Lamborn (R)	$13,573	$0
Hal Bidlack (D)	$0	$0
Brian Scott (C)	$0	$0

== District 6 ==
2008 Colorado's 6th congressional district election
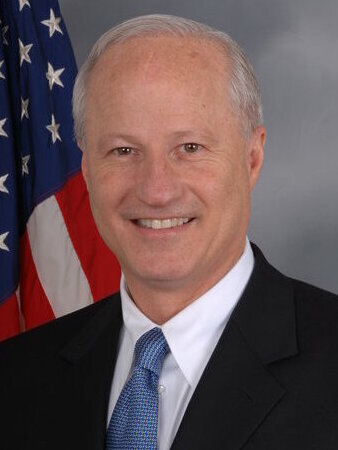

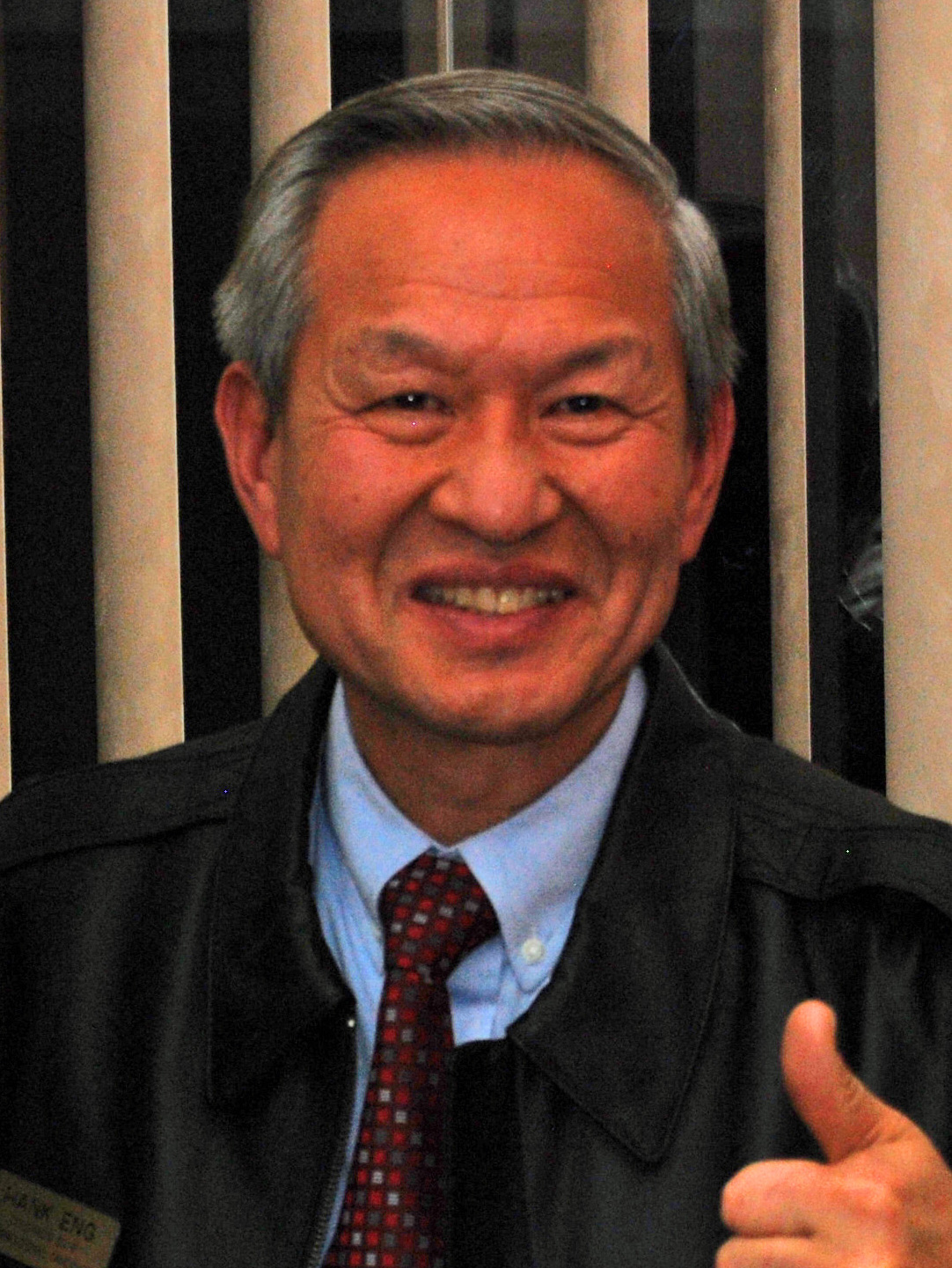
Nominee	Mike Coffman	Hank Eng
Party	Republican	Democratic
Popular vote	250,877	162,641
Percentage	60.7%	39.3%
- Coffman: 50–60% 60–70% 70–80% 80–90% Eng: 50–60% 60–70% Tie: 50–60% No Votes
U.S. Representative before election
Tom Tancredo
Republican
Elected U.S. Representative
Mike Coffman
Republican

Incumbent Republican Tom Tancredo, who had represented this solidly conservative district based in the Denver suburbs since 1999, retired in order to run for President. He was re-elected with 58.6% of the vote in 2006 and the district had a PVI of R+10.

His seat was considered to be the most Republican-dominated district of the Denver-area seats and was also one of the wealthiest in the nation. Tancredo was the second highest vote getter for a Republican congressional candidate statewide in 2006, just behind Doug Lamborn in the 5th district. The district includes Columbine High School, which was devastated in a tragic 1999 school massacre.

=== Republican primary ===
==== Candidates ====
===== Nominee =====
- Mike Coffman, Secretary of State of Colorado

===== Eliminated in primary =====
- Wil Armstrong, businessman and son of former senator William L. Armstrong (endorsed by the State GOP)
- Ted Harvey, state senator
- Steve Ward, state senator

===== Declined =====
- Frank McNulty, state representative
- Tom Tancredo, incumbent U.S. Representative
- Tom Wiens, state senator, nominee for Colorado State Treasurer in 1978 and candidate for the 3rd District in 1982

==== Results ====
Republican primary results
Party	Candidate	Votes	%
Republican	Mike Coffman	28,509	40.1
Republican	Wil Armstrong	23,213	32.7
Republican	Ted Harvey	10,886	15.3
Republican	Steve Ward	8,452	11.9
Total votes		71,060	100.0

=== Democratic primary ===
==== Candidates ====
===== Nominee =====
- Hank Eng, aerospace engineer

===== Withdrawn =====
- Mike Collins, Vietnam veteran

===== Declined =====
- Dave Hnida, physician
- Joe Rice, state representative
- David Wasserman, physician

==== Results ====
Democratic primary results
Party	Candidate	Votes	%
Democratic	Hank Eng	27,661	100.0
Total votes		27,661	100.0

=== General election ===
==== Campaign ====
Despite some minor controversies surrounding Mike Coffman and Colorado Ethics Watch, CQ Politics, The Cook Political Report and The Rothenberg Political Report all forecasted the race as 'Safe Republican'.

==== Endorsements ====
Mike Coffman (R)

Newspapers

- The Denver Post

==== Predictions ====
Source	Ranking	As of
The Cook Political Report	Safe R	November 6, 2008
Rothenberg	Safe R	November 2, 2008
Sabato's Crystal Ball	Safe R	November 6, 2008
Real Clear Politics	Safe R	November 7, 2008
CQ Politics	Safe R	November 6, 2008

==== Results ====
Colorado's 6th congressional district election, 2008
Party	Candidate	Votes	%
Republican	Mike Coffman	250,877	60.7
Democratic	Hank Eng	162,641	39.3
Majority		88,236	21.3
Valid ballots		413,518	94.0
Invalid or blank votes		26,527	6.0
Turnout		440,045	95.7
Registered electors		459,807	
Republican hold			

==== Finances ====
===== Campaigns =====
Candidate (party)	Raised	Spent	Cash on hand
Mike Coffman (R)	$1,467,713	$1,304,685	$163,029
Hank Eng (D)	$273,696	$270,609	$3,084

===== Outside Spending =====
Candidate (party)	Supported	Opposed
Mike Coffman (R)	$11,651	$0
Hank Eng (D)	$0	$0

== District 7 ==
2008 Colorado's 7th congressional district election
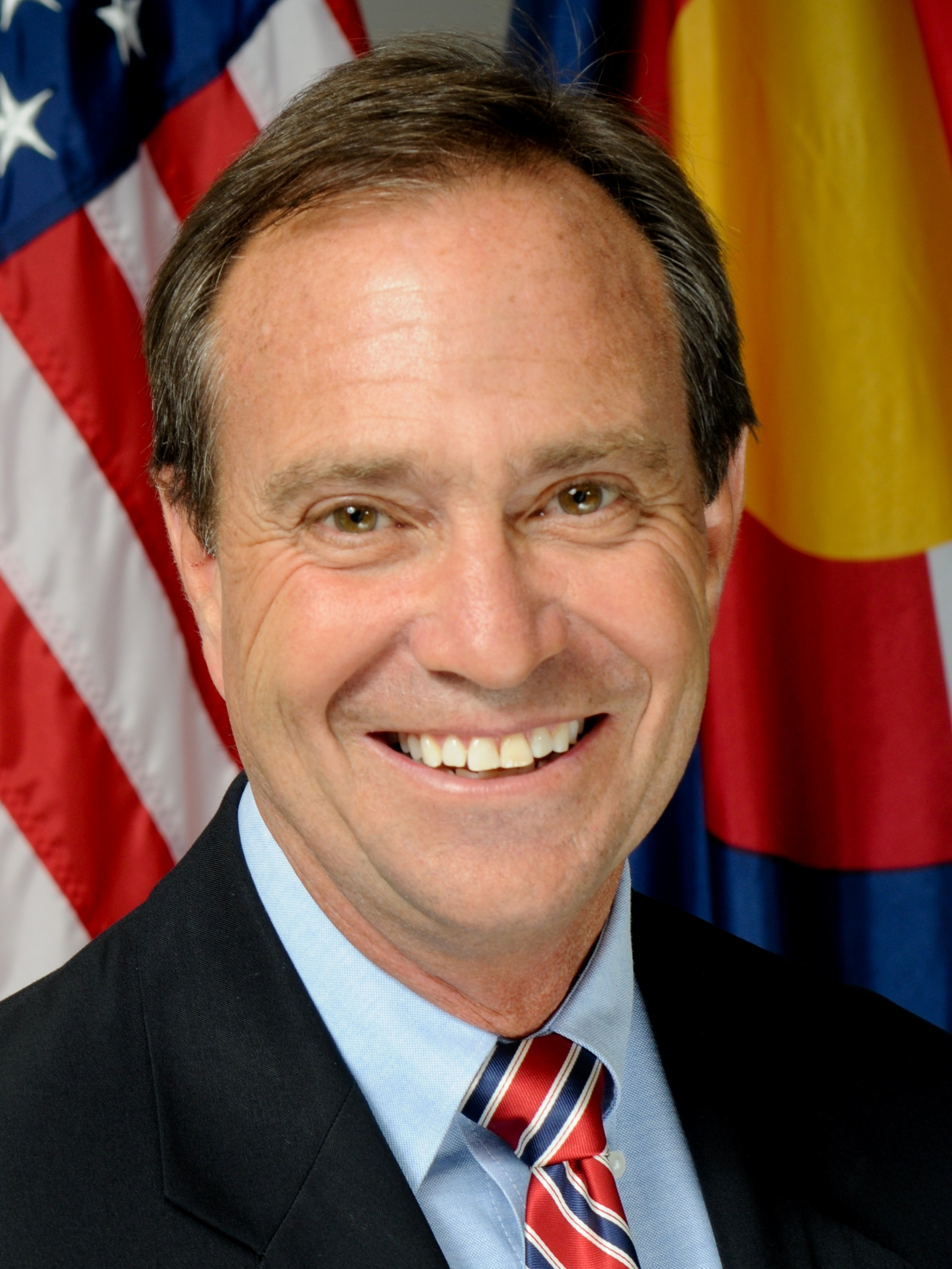

Nominee	Ed Perlmutter	John Lerew
Party	Democratic	Republican
Popular vote	173,937	100,057
Percentage	63.5%	36.5%
- Perlmutter: 50–60% 60–70% 70–80% 80–90% Lerew: 50–60% 60–70% 70–80% 80–90% Tie: 50–60% No Votes
U.S. Representative before election
Ed Perlmutter
Democratic
Elected U.S. Representative
Ed Perlmutter
Democratic

Incumbent Democratic Ed Perlmutter, who had represented this suburban Denver district since 2007, ran for re-election. He was elected with 54.9% of the vote in 2006 and the district had a PVI of D+2. The district's voter registration was split, with independents constituting a slim plurality of 35% compared to Democrats (34%) and Republicans (31%).

=== Democratic primary ===
==== Candidates ====
===== Nominee =====
- Ed Perlmutter, incumbent U.S. Representative

==== Results ====
Democratic primary results
Party	Candidate	Votes	%
Democratic	Ed Perlmutter (incumbent)	29,704	100.0
Total votes		29,704	100.0

=== Republican primary ===
==== Candidates ====
===== Nominee =====
- John Lerew, founder of a financial planning center

==== Results ====
Republican primary results
Party	Candidate	Votes	%
Republican	John Lerew	25,155	100.0
Total votes		25,155	100.0

=== General election ===
==== Endorsements ====
Ed Perlmutter (D)

Labor unions

- AFL-CIO

Organizations

- Citizens for Global Solutions
- Planned Parenthood Action Fund

Newspapers

- The Denver Post

==== Predictions ====
Source	Ranking	As of
The Cook Political Report	Safe D	November 6, 2008
Rothenberg	Safe D	November 2, 2008
Sabato's Crystal Ball	Safe D	November 6, 2008
Real Clear Politics	Safe D	November 7, 2008
CQ Politics	Safe D	November 6, 2008

==== Results ====
Colorado's 7th congressional district election, 2008
Party	Candidate	Votes	%
Democratic	Ed Perlmutter (incumbent)	173,937	63.5
Republican	John Lerew	100,057	36.5
Majority		73,880	27.0
Valid ballots		273,994	94.2
Invalid or blank votes		16,945	5.8
Turnout		290,939	92.5
Registered electors		314,642	
Democratic hold			

==== Finances ====
===== Campaigns =====
Candidate (party)	Raised	Spent	Cash on hand
Ed Perlmutter (D)	$1,770,087	$1,228,238	$544,853
John Lerew (R)	$34,048	$34,048	$0

===== Outside Spending =====
Candidate (party)	Supported	Opposed
Ed Perlmutter (D)	$7,736	$0
John Lerew (R)	$10,861	$0
