= Joann Ginal =

American politician

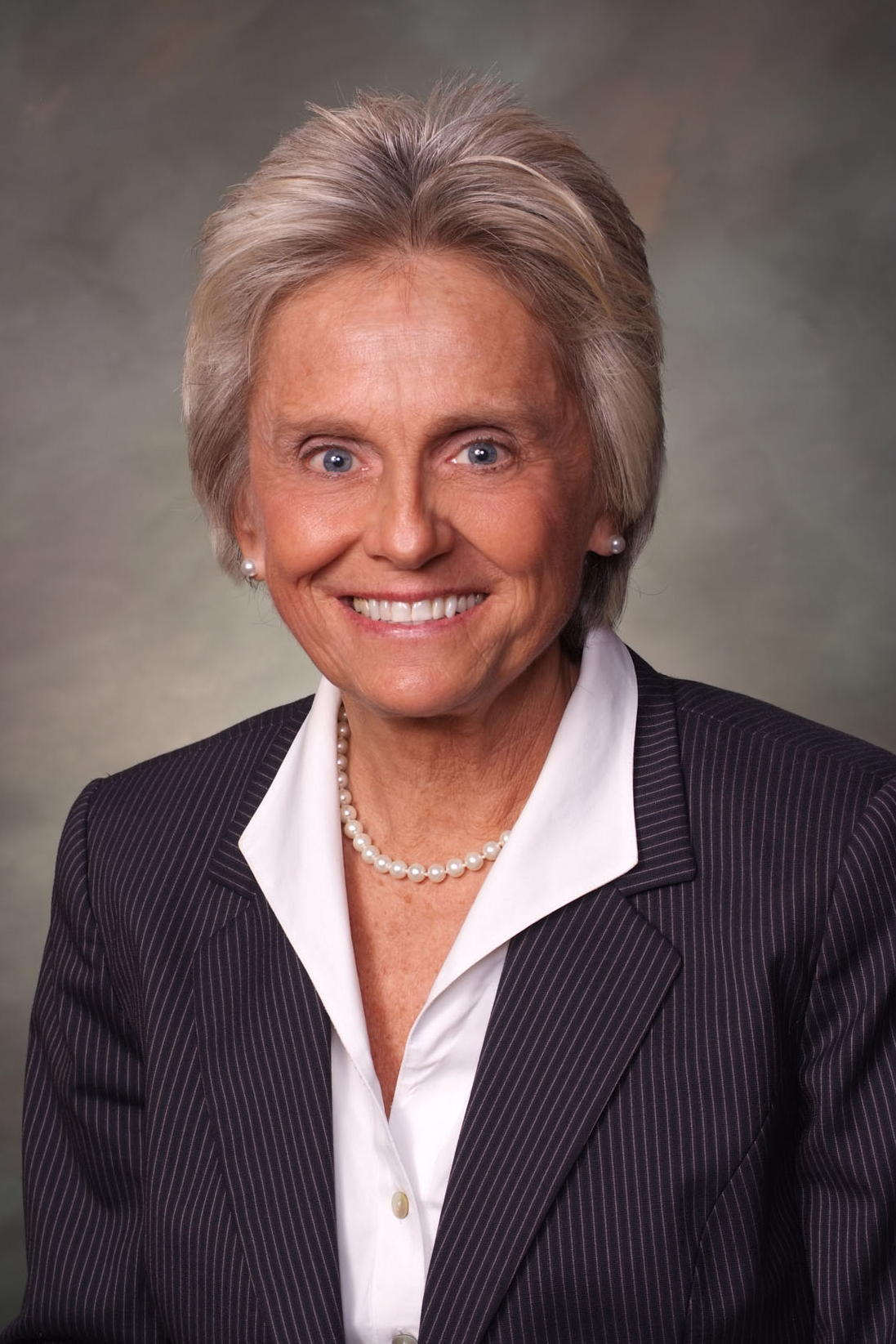

Member of the Colorado Senate from the 14th district
- In office January 4, 2019 – January 8, 2025
- Preceded by: John Kefalas
- Succeeded by: Cathy Kipp

Member of the Colorado House of Representatives from the 52nd district
- In office January 9, 2013 – January 4, 2019
- Preceded by: John Kefalas
- Succeeded by: Cathy Kipp

Personal details
- Born: Manchester, New Hampshire, U.S.
- Party: Democratic
- Education: University of New Hampshire (BS); Iowa State University (MS); Colorado State University (PhD)

Joann Ginal is an American politician who serves in the Colorado Senate from the 14th district since 2019, as a member of the Democratic Party. Before her tenure in the state senate she served in the Colorado House of Representatives from the 52nd district from 2013 to 2019.

Ginal was born in Manchester, New Hampshire, and also lived in Florida and Massachusetts. She graduated from the University of New Hampshire, Iowa State University, and Colorado State University during which she moved to Fort Collins, Colorado. In 2012, she was elected to the state house to succeed John Kefalas, who had run for a seat in the state senate, and served until she was selected to replace Kefalas in the state senate in 2018.

== Early life and education ==
Joann Ginal was born in Manchester, New Hampshire. She lived in Florida and Massachusetts before moving to Fort Collins, Colorado, to continue her college education in 1990. She graduated from the University of New Hampshire with a Bachelor of Science in biology, Iowa State University with a Master of Science in zoology and parasitology, and Colorado State University with a PhD in reproductive endocrinology. Ginal received a honored certification from the Harvard Kennedy School. She planned to marry her partner after the legalization of same-sex civil unions in Colorado.

== State legislature ==
=== Elections ===
In 2012, John Kefalas, a Democratic member of the Colorado House of Representatives from the 52nd district, chose to run for a seat in the Colorado Senate from the 14th district. Ginal won the Democratic nomination without opposition and defeated Republican nominee Bob Morain in the general election. She defeated Republican nominee Donna Walter in the 2014, 2016, and 2018 elections.

Senator Kefalas was elected to a seat on the county commission in Larimer County during the 2018 election and resigned from the state senate to take the office. Ginal defeated Representative Jennifer Arndt, William Wright, and Michael Thomas in the vote conducted by the vacancy committee on December 16, 2018. Cathy Kipp, a member of the board of directors for the Poudre School district, was selected to replace Ginal in the state house. During the 2020 election she won the Democratic nomination and defeated Republican nominee Hans D. Hochheimer in the general election.

=== Tenure ===
During Ginal's tenure in the state house she served on the Health, Insurance and Environment, Transportation and Energy, and Public Health Care and Human Services committees. She served as chair of the Health, Insurance and Environment committee. She was a member of the LGBTQ Caucus in the state house. Ginal served on the Local Government, Agriculture and Natural Resources, and Health and Human Services committees in the state senate. She served as the chair of the Local Government and vice-chair of the Health and Human Services committee.

== Political positions ==
In 2015, Ginal and Representative Lois Court introduced legislation to allow for terminally ill people with less than six months left to live to undergo euthanasia. She stated that she created the legislation because of Brittany Maynard, a brain cancer patient, who moved from California to Oregon to end her life. Their legislation failed in the state house, but Proposition 106, which allowed for assisted suicide, was passed with 64.9% of the popular vote in 2016.

Ginal introduced legislation in 2016, to make rolling coal a Class 2 misdemeanor traffic offense and the legislation was signed into law by Governor John Hickenlooper on June 5, 2017. Ginal was among thirty-seven legislators who endorsed a letter in 2018, calling for Planned Parenthood to allow for their workers to form a union. She sponsored legislation to allow people in Colorado to import prescription drugs from Canada. In 2019, she and Representative Alex Valdez were recognized as the best legislators by the Colorado Voters for Animals, an animal rights organization.

In 2023, she was the only member of her caucus to vote against a major land use reform bill in the Colorado Senate that would have upzoned neighborhoods and enabled more housing construction in Colorado.

== Electoral history ==
2012 Colorado House of Representatives 52nd district election
Primary election
Party	Candidate	Votes	%
Democratic	Joann Ginal	2,953	100.00%
Total votes		2,953	100.00%
General election
Democratic	Joann Ginal	24,841	56.10%
Republican	Bob Morain	19,442	43.90%
Total votes		44,283	100.00%

2014 Colorado House of Representatives 52nd district election
Primary election
Party	Candidate	Votes	%
Democratic	Joann Ginal (incumbent)	3,498	100.00%
Total votes		3,498	100.00%
General election
Democratic	Joann Ginal (incumbent)	19,403	55.16%
Republican	Donna Walter	15,774	44.84%
Total votes		35,177	100.00%

2016 Colorado House of Representatives 52nd district election
Primary election
Party	Candidate	Votes	%
Democratic	Joann Ginal (incumbent)	4,341	100.00%
Total votes		4,341	100.00%
General election
Democratic	Joann Ginal (incumbent)	25,876	54.70%
Republican	Donna Walter	21,428	45.30%
Total votes		47,304	100.00%

2018 Colorado House of Representatives 52nd district election
Primary election
Party	Candidate	Votes	%
Democratic	Joann Ginal (incumbent)	11,684	100.00%
Total votes		11,684	100.00%
General election
Democratic	Joann Ginal (incumbent)	29,708	64.13%
Republican	Donna Walter	16,614	35.87%
Total votes		46,322	100.00%

2018 Colorado Senate 14th district Democratic selection
Party	Candidate	Votes	%
Democratic	Joann Ginal	45	50.56%
Democratic	Jennifer Arndt	42	48.31%
Democratic	William Wright	2	2.25%
Democratic	Michael Thomas	0	0.00%
Total votes		89	100.00%

2020 Colorado Senate 14th district election
Primary election
Party	Candidate	Votes	%
Democratic	Joann Ginal (incumbent)	29,452	100.00%
Total votes		29,452	100.00%
General election
Democratic	Joann Ginal (incumbent)	63,409	66.65%
Republican	Hans D. Hochheimer	31,724	33.35%
Total votes		95,133	100.00%
