= Bob Bacon =

American politician (born 1935)

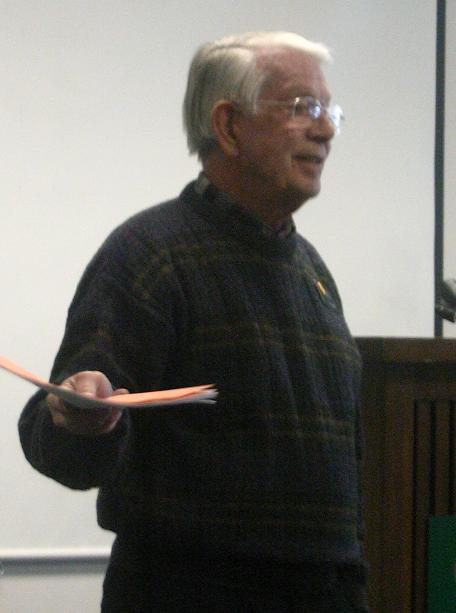

Member of the Colorado Senate from the 14th district
- In office January 2005 – January 2013
- Preceded by: Peggy Reeves
- Succeeded by: John Kefalas

Member of the Colorado House of Representatives from the 53rd district
- In office January 1997 – January 2003
- Preceded by: Peggy Reeves
- Succeeded by: Angie Paccione

Personal details
- Born: July 14, 1935 (age 91) Galesburg, Illinois, U.S.
- Party: Democratic
- Spouse: Beverly Bacon
- Children: 3
- Education: Illinois State University (BS); University of Northern Colorado (MA)
- Profession: Educator, retired

Robert Bacon is a retired educator and Democratic politician from Fort Collins, Colorado. Bacon served as a Democratic member of the Colorado Senate, representing the 14th district from 2005 to 2013. Bacon also served in the Colorado State House from 1997 to 2003. Prior to that, he was elected twice to the Poudre School District Board of Education, serving from 1991 to 1999. Bacon Elementary School is named in his honor.

== Biography ==
Born in Galesburg, Illinois, Bacon earned a B.S. in social sciences at Illinois State University in 1957, and taught high school in Illinois before moving to Fort Collins, Colorado, in 1959. He received a master's degree in history from University of Northern Colorado in 1961 while teaching in Poudre School District, where he remained until 1991, when he took a post at Front Range Community College for four years and then retiring. With his wife Beverly, Bacon has three grown children. In southeast Fort Collins, he was honored with the naming of Bacon Elementary School.

Bob Bacon was a teacher from 1957 to 1996.

== Political history ==
Bacon was a director and board member for Poudre School District Board of Education from 1991 to 1999.

After retiring from the Poudre School District, Bacon was twice elected as a director to the Poudre School District Board of Education, serving from 1991 to 1999. He was then elected to the State House 53rd District in 1996, where he represented western Fort Collins, and rose to the post of Assistant Minority Leader.

Bacon was elected to his first term in the State Senate in 2004, defeating Republican Ray Martinez, a former Fort Collins mayor, and Libertarian Mark Brophy. In 2008, Bacon defeated Republican Matt Fries to win reelection.

Bob Bacon has had the following political experience:

- Senator, Colorado State Senate, 2004–2012
- Assistant Minority Leader, Colorado State House of Representatives, 1999-2000
- Representative, Colorado State House of Representatives, 1997-2004
- Director/Board Member, Poudre School District Board of Education, 1991-1999

== Senate committee assignments ==
=== 2011-2012 ===
In the 2011-2012 legislative session, Bacon served on these committees:

- Appropriations Committee, Colorado State Senate
- Capital Development Committee, Colorado General Assembly, Vice Chair
- Education Committee, Colorado State Senate, Chair
- State, Veterans, and Military Affairs Committee, Colorado State Senate, Vice Chair

=== 2009-2010 ===
- In the 2009-2010 legislative session, Bacon served on these committees:
- Appropriations Committee, Colorado Senate
- Education Committee, Colorado Senate
- State, Veterans & Military Affairs Committee, Colorado Senate
