= Cathy Kipp =

American politician

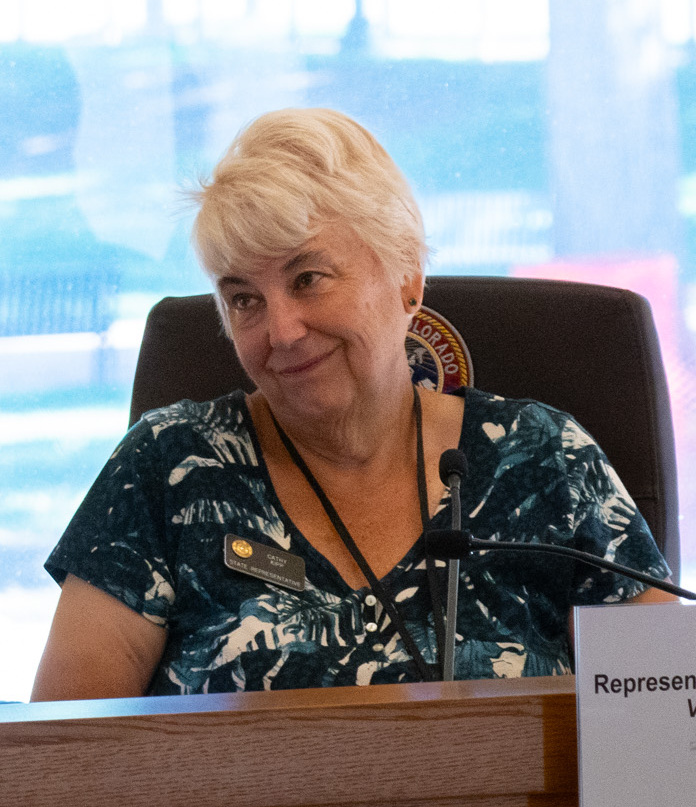
- Kipp in 2023

President pro tempore of the Colorado Senate
- Incumbent
- Assumed office February 23, 2026
- Preceded by: Dafna Michaelson Jenet

Member of the Colorado Senate from the 14th district
- Incumbent
- Assumed office January 8, 2025
- Preceded by: Joann Ginal

Member of the Colorado House of Representatives from the 52nd district
- In office January 7, 2019 – January 8, 2025
- Preceded by: Joann Ginal
- Succeeded by: Yara Zokaie

Personal details
- Born: 1962 or 1963 (age 62–63) Berkeley, California, U.S.
- Party: Democratic
- Children: Two
- Education: University of California, Santa Cruz (BS)

Cathy Flint Kipp (born 1962/1963) is an American politician, currently serving as a member of the Colorado Senate from the 14th district, which includes Fort Collins, Colorado.

== Early life and education ==
Kipp was born and raised in Berkeley, California. She earned a Bachelor of Science degree in Computer and Information Science from the University of California, Santa Cruz. After graduating from college, she moved to Fort Collins, Colorado.

== Career ==
Prior to entering politics, Kipp worked as a database engineer. She served as a member of the Poudre School District Board of Education from 2011 to 2017. She was appointed to serve in the Colorado House of Representatives in 2019, replacing Democratic incumbent Joann Ginal, who was appointed to fill a vacant seat in the Colorado Senate.

Kipp was elected to Colorado Senate in the 2024 Colorado Senate election. She was selected as president pro tempore by the Democratic caucus in February 2026.

== Personal life ==
Kipp and her husband, Don, have twin boys.

Colorado Senate
Preceded by Dafna Michaelson Jenet	President pro tempore of the Colorado Senate; 2026–present	Incumbent
