= Colorado's 14th Senate district =

American legislative district

Colorado's 14th State Senate district
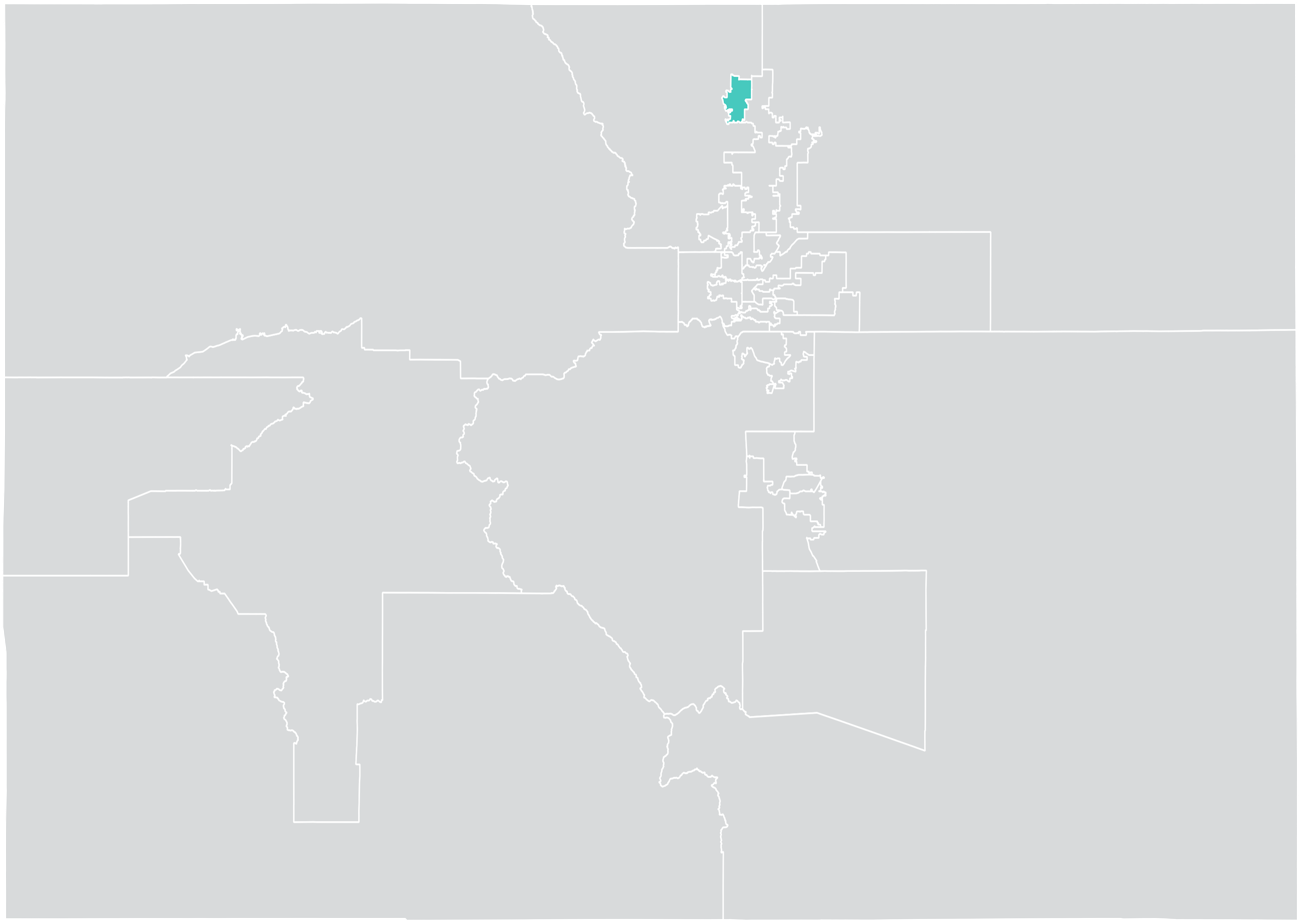
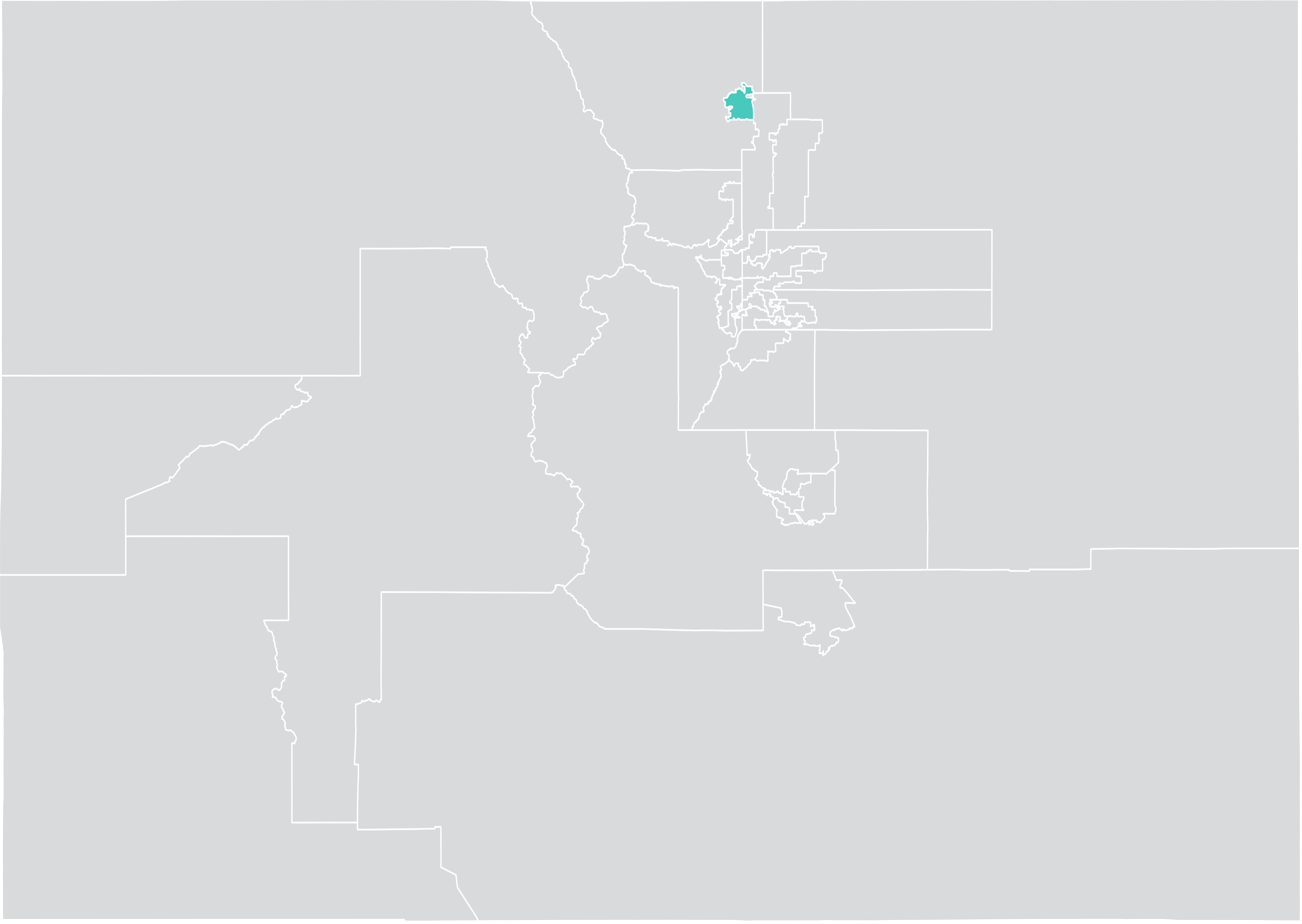
Senator
Cathy Kipp; D–Fort Collins
- Registration: 31.3% Democratic; 15.4% Republican; 50.8% No party preference
- Demographics: 80% White; 1% Black; 12% Hispanic; 3% Asian; 1% Native American; 2% Other
- Population (2018): 164,588
- Registered voters: 125,319

Colorado's 14th Senate district is one of 35 districts in the Colorado Senate. It has been represented by Democrat Cathy Kipp since January 2025.

== Geography ==
District 14 is exactly coterminous with the city of Fort Collins in Larimer County.

The district is located entirely within Colorado's 2nd congressional district, and overlaps with the 52nd and 53rd districts of the Colorado House of Representatives.

== Recent election results ==
Colorado state senators are elected to staggered four-year terms; under normal circumstances, the 14th district holds elections in presidential years.

=== 2024 ===
In 2024, incumbent Senator Joann Ginal did not run for reelection. State Representative Cathy Kipp ran unopposed in the 2024 Democratic primary.

2024 Colorado Senate election, District 14
Party	Candidate	Votes	%
Democratic	Cathy Kipp	58,742	68.24
Republican	Phoebe McWilliams	24,085	27.98
Libertarian	Jeffrey Brosius	3,259	3.79%
Total votes		86,086	100
Democratic hold			

=== 2020 ===
In 2018, incumbent Senator John Kefalas won a seat on the Larimer County Board of Commissioners, cutting his legislative term short. Then-State Rep. Joann Ginal was chosen to replace him in the Senate, narrowly defeating fellow State Rep. Jeni Arndt 45-42 at a Democratic vacancy committee meeting.

2020 Colorado State Senate election, District 14
Party	Candidate	Votes	%
Democratic	Joann Ginal (incumbent)	63,409	66.7
Republican	Hans Hochheimer	31,724	33.3
Total votes		95,133	100
Democratic hold			

=== 2016 ===
2016 Colorado State Senate election, District 14
Party	Candidate	Votes	%
Democratic	John Kefalas (incumbent)	52,902	61.7
Republican	Hans Hochheimer	32,886	38.3
Total votes		85,788	100
Democratic hold			

=== 2012 ===
2012 Colorado State Senate election, District 14
Party	Candidate	Votes	%
Democratic	John Kefalas	46,673	57.9
Republican	Syndi Anderson	28,874	35.9
Libertarian	Jeff Johnston	3,166	3.9
Independent	Barrett Rothe	1,828	2.3
Total votes		80,541	100
Democratic hold			

=== Federal and statewide results ===
Year	Office	Results
2020	President	Biden 67.8 – 28.9%
2018	Governor	Polis 66.4 – 30.5%
2016	President	Clinton 57.5 – 31.6%
2014	Senate	Udall 57.1 – 38.0%
2014	Governor	Hickenlooper 59.0 – 35.6%
2012	President	Obama 59.5 – 37.5%
