= Angie Paccione =

American politician

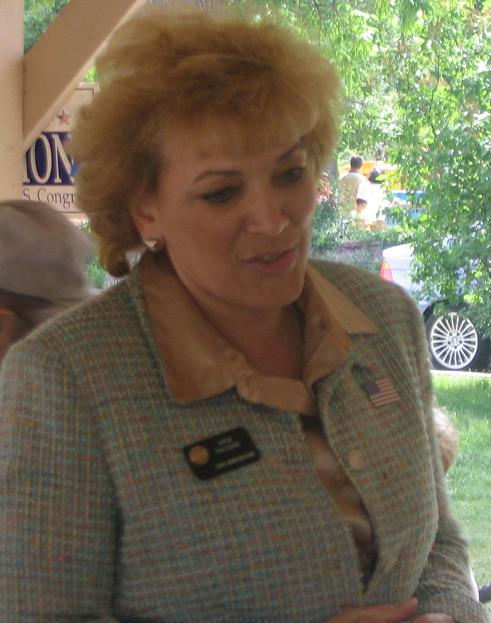
- Paccione in 2006

Member of the Colorado House of Representatives from the 53rd district
- In office January 8, 2003 – January 10, 2007
- Preceded by: Bob Bacon
- Succeeded by: Randy Fischer

Executive Director of Colorado Department of Higher Education
- In office January 10, 2019 – January 9, 2026
- Succeeded by: JB Holston

Personal details
- Born: Angie Veronica Paccione; February 21, 1960 (age 66) New York City, New York, U.S.
- Party: Democratic
- Education: Stanford University

Angela Veronica "Angie" Paccione (born February 21, 1960) is an American politician and former Colorado legislator who was a 2006 Congressional candidate.

A college basketball player at Stanford and professional basketball player in the 1980s, Paccione became a high school coach, teacher and administrator before earning a Ph.D. in education and joining the faculty of Colorado State University.

Entering politics in 2002, Paccione, a Democrat, spent two terms representing west Fort Collins in the Colorado House of Representatives, rising to become House Majority Caucus Chair. In the legislature, she focused on issues relating to youth and higher education.

In 2006, she was the Democratic nominee for U.S. Congress in Colorado's 4th Congressional district, narrowly losing to two-term incumbent Republican Marilyn Musgrave. After briefly launching a second Congressional campaign in 2007, Paccione stepped out of the race to join a business consulting firm.

In 2019 Colorado Governor Jared Polis appointed Paccione to be the executive director of the Colorado Department of Higher Education. On January 17, 2019, she was unanimously voted into the position by the Senate Education Committee. She resigned as director of the higher education department on January 9, 2026 and returned to work in the private sector.

== Biography ==
Paccione was born in the South Bronx in New York City to a single mother; she is biracial, with an English-Irish birth father and African-American mother. When she was ten years old, Paccione took the name of her step father, Paccione. After her family moved outside of the city, Paccione attended Cornwall Central High School in Orange County, where she played high school basketball, volleyball, and soccer. Excelling particularly in basketball, Paccione was a member of the 1977 USA Women's Select National Team, Parade Magazine's First All-American Team and numerous other high school All-American Teams. During her sophomore year in high school, she also participated in tryouts for the United States' first Olympic women's basketball team in 1976, making it to the penultimate cut in the eastern division, but was not selected for the team.

After graduating from high school in 1978, Paccione received a full athletic scholarship to attend Stanford University. While at Stanford, she was a member of the Fellowship of Christian Athletes, and, during summers, toured Europe with the Christian missionary basketball team "News Release". Paccione attended Stanford for five years; during that time, she played four years of college basketball, red-shirting during her junior year. She graduated in 1983 with a bachelor's degree and honors in political science and completed requirements for a degree in psychology as well. After college, Paccione also traveled with Athletes-in-Action, a sports ministry of Campus Crusade for Christ. After graduating, Paccione played professional basketball with the Columbus Minks, part of the Women's American Basketball Association before the league folded.

In 1985, Paccione moved to Colorado, where she worked at Excelsior Youth Center, a residential treatment center for troubled girls, for two years before earning her teaching license from the University of Denver. During her teacher training, Angie was awarded the Future Teacher Award by the Colorado Commission on Higher Education.

Paccione then taught social studies at Smoky Hill High School in Aurora, Colorado—then Colorado's second-largest high school—for four years, from 1987 to 1991. From 1991 to 1995, she was a dean of students responsible for student attendance, behavior and school culture. While at Smoky Hill, Paccione became the only woman in the history of Colorado to coach a high school boys' varsity sport (basketball) in the large school classification.

Between 1988 and 1992, eight monetary relief claims were filed against Paccione for uncollected debt, and she was sued by the state of Colorado for unpaid student loans. In 1992, Paccione declared Chapter 7 bankruptcy, and all debts were ultimately resolved. Paccione was required to repay all of the student loan and settled that debt in 1993. The bankruptcy and debts were later raised by political opponents in attack ads.

In 1994, Paccione began graduate work in education at Colorado State University in Fort Collins, Colorado; she worked with Project Promise, a teacher-preparation program of excellence, rising to become the program's associate director in 1998, co-director in 2001, and director in 2002. She earned an M.Ed. in Education and Human Resource Studies in 1995, and a Ph.D. in Education and Human Resource Studies in 1998; her doctoral dissertation, Multicultural perspective transformation: Developing a commitment to diversity, examined the experiences of individuals who developed personal commitments to diversity-related issues. An instructor and then an assistant professor of teacher education at Colorado State, Paccione supervised student teachers and taught coursework in diversity, educational technology, curriculum development, communication, and philosophy of education. Stepping down from the faculty in 2003 to focus on her work as a state representative, Paccione remained a research associate with Colorado State's Interwest Equity Assistance Center, focusing on diversity issues in education throughout the federal Region VIII.

== USA Basketball ==
Paccione was named to the team representing the US at the inaugural William Jones Cup competition in Taipei, Taiwan. In subsequent years, the teams would be primarily college age players, but in the inaugural event, eight of the twelve players, including Paccione, were in high school. The USA team had a record of 3–4, finishing in fifth place, although one of the wins was over South Korea, who would go on to win the gold medal.

== Legislative career ==
Before 2000, Paccione was uninvolved in politics; however, that year, after seeing no Democrat on the Congressional ballot in Colorado's 4th district, she chose to pursue political office.

Briefly seeking the Democratic Congressional nomination in 2002, Paccione stepped aside in favor of Stan Matsunaka, and then sought the state legislative seat being vacated by Rep. Bob Bacon. Fort Collins businessman Larry Chisesi also sought the Democratic nomination, and, at first, the two agreed to avoid a primary by means of a coin toss. Paccione, however, lost the coin toss but ran for election anyway, ultimately defeating Chisesi in the Democratic primary with 56 percent of the vote.

After winning the 2002 Democratic primary, Paccione was elected as a Democrat to the Republican-controlled Colorado House of Representatives from House District 53, representing western Fort Collins. She defeated Republican Kirk Brush by roughly 700 votes, or about 4 percentage points, and was sworn in during January 2003 as a member of the minority party in a Republican-controlled legislature. Following her first election, Paccione was cited and fined twice by the state of Colorado for filing late campaign finance reports; roughly one-quarter of legislators elected in that cycle were similarly cited, but the fines were used against her in her later Congressional campaign.

During her first term in the legislature, Paccione successfully sponsored a measure that allowed minors to sit on the boards of Colorado non-profit organizations, and successfully sponsored another measure to grant 24 college credits to graduating high school students who successfully complete the International Baccalaureate Diploma Program.

Paccione was re-elected to a second term in 2004 by a wide margin, defeating Republican Ed Hayes. She rose to become Majority Caucus Chair in 2005 after the Colorado Democratic Party gained control of the assembly. During both her terms in the legislature, Paccione sat on the Joint Committee on Computer Management — chairing the committee in 2006 — the House Committee on Business Affairs and Labor, and the House Committee on Education; she served as vice-chair of the Education Committee during her second term and chaired the subcommittee on Higher Education.

In 2005, after a series of alcohol-related deaths among college students in Colorado, Paccione sponsored legislation to both increase the penalties for distributing alcohol to those under 21 years of age, to ban alcohol inhalation machines, and to provide immunity to those who seek medical assistance in cases of alcohol poisoning. That same year, she also sponsored a measure to allow Colorado consumers to restrict access to their credit reports in order to deter identity theft and credit solicitation.

A 2006 special session of the Colorado General Assembly, called to address immigration issues, became a focal point Paccione's Congressional campaign against Marilyn Musgrave (see below). During the special session, Paccione sponsored legislation to strengthen penalties for employers who hire illegal immigrants, and to create a division of the Colorado State Patrol to address trafficking in illegal immigrants. Paccione had also voted on several occasions to allow illegal immigrants who graduate from Colorado schools to receive in-state college tuition benefits, votes she was criticized for by Musgrave.

== Congressional campaigns ==
=== 2006 congressional election ===
After forming an exploratory committee in June 2005, Paccione announced, in September 2005, her intention to challenge two-term incumbent Republican Marilyn Musgrave for Colorado's Fourth Congressional District, in what evolved into a highly competitive battle the Cook Report rated a "toss-up" race for the historically Republican seat. In September, the race was designated as a third-tier pickup opportunity for Democrats by the Democratic Congressional Campaign Committee, which provided $70,000 to the Paccione campaign for direct mail advertising. Paccione was endorsed by the Denver Post.

In addition to the closeness of the race, the contest made national headlines in June 2006, when a Democratic activist, unconnected with the Paccione campaign, left a flyer filled with dog feces at Musgrave's office in Greeley. The Paccione campaign denied any knowledge of the action and the activist who left the flier was charged but acquitted of criminal use of a noxious substance.

In July, Paccione was endorsed by Michael Schiavo, husband of Terri Schiavo, who criticized Rep. Musgrave for what he considered to be her support of government interference in end-of-life decisions. Paccione joined him during a highly publicized photo opportunity in which Schiavo hand-delivered a letter critical of Musgrave to her Congressional office in Loveland.

During the race, Paccione's campaign criticized Musgrave for her emphasis on divisive social issues such as gay marriage, her close relationship with President George W. Bush, and her reputation as ethically corrupt, regularly referring to Musgrave as "Special Interest Marilyn" in press releases.

The heated multimillion-dollar race was targeted nationally by both major parties and 527 committees, and became a priority for the National Republican Congressional Committee, which sent hundreds of thousands of dollars into the district. An October poll showing Musgrave with a 10-percentage point advantage led the DCCC to withdraw plans to spend $630,000 on television and radio advertising. In response, Fort Collins philanthropist Pat Stryker donated $720,000 to local 527 groups to advertise in favor of Paccione. All told, Paccione's campaign raised and spent nearly $2 million. Paccione received support from a number of prominent Democrats who came to Colorado to support her campaign — including Rep. Xavier Becerra, Rep. Hilda Solis, Rep. Diane Watson, Rep. Barbara Lee, Rep. Rahm Emanuel, and General Wesley Clark.

Although polls in the final weeks of the race showed the contest tightening, spurring a visit by President George W. Bush to support Musgrave, Paccione ultimately lost to Musgrave by just under 2.5% of votes cast—or under 6,000 votes out of roughly 240,000 — finishing closer than the previous Democratic challenger Stan Matsunaka who received 44.8% of the votes cast in a three-way race with Green Party Candidate Kinsey and Musgrave. In a three-way race that included Reform Party candidate Eric Eidsness, Musgrave garnered 45.61% to Paccione's 43.12%, and Eidsness 11.28% of the vote.

=== 2008 congressional election ===
In May 2007, Paccione filed a statement of candidacy with the Federal Election Commission and began raising money for a second congressional run. In an email to supporters, she admitted some of the weaknesses of her first campaign, including an inexperienced campaign staff, and she hired a Denver campaign consulting firm to manage her 2008 campaign.

Paccione faced Eric Eidsness, who had joined the Democratic Party, and Betsy Markey, a former aide to U.S. Senator Ken Salazar. Both Paccione and Markey, with prominent connections in the Colorado Democratic Party, vied for endorsements and in fundraising during 2007. In the second quarter of 2007, Paccione raised approximately $100,000 to Markey's $60,000. Although Markey was endorsed by a number of Colorado Democrats, including Senator Ken Salazar, former Congressional candidate Stan Matsunaka, and State Senator Bob Bacon, Paccione also garnered the support of prominent Democrats, including former Denver Mayor Wellington Webb and State Senate President Pro Tem Peter Groff.

In September 2007, however, despite her fundraising lead, Paccione announced her withdrawal from the Congressional race in order to accept a position with Pathways to Leadership (renamed Verus Global), a business consulting firm, and announced that she would return money raised for her Congressional campaign back to contributors. Paccione had worked with Pathways to Leadership since January 2007, and cited the expanded international travel and the opportunity to impact lives associated with her leadership consulting work as a factor in decision to withdraw from the Congressional race. Together with the withdrawal of Reform Party-turned-Democrat Eric Eidsness shortly after Paccione, her withdrawal cleared the Democratic nomination field for Betsy Markey, who went on to win both the Democratic nomination and the general election in 2008. In 2012, Paccione worked as a Director with Verus Global, Inc.
