= Marilyn Musgrave =

American politician (born 1949)

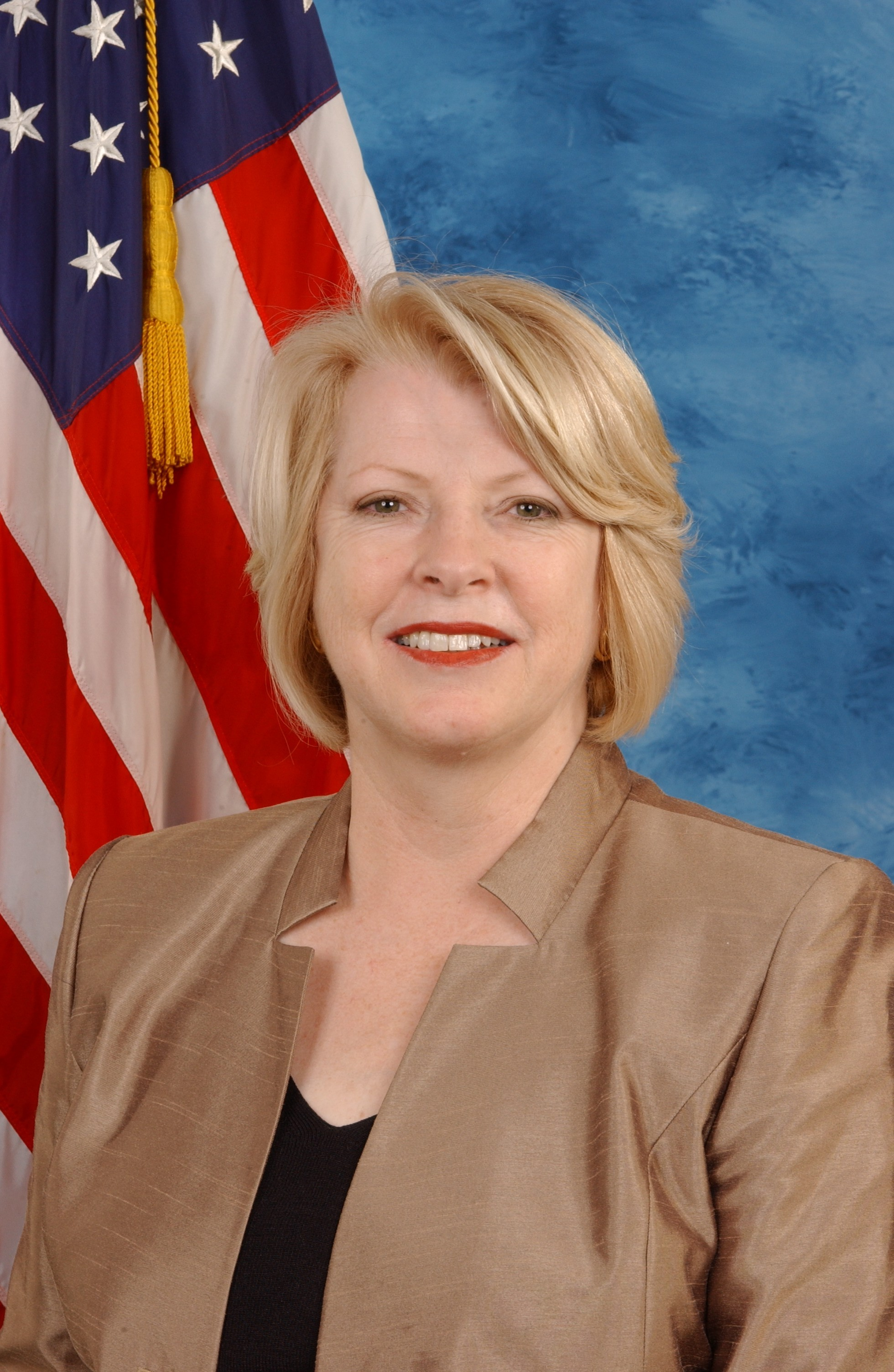
- Official portrait, 2003

Member of the U.S. House of Representatives from Colorado's 4th district
- In office January 3, 2003 – January 3, 2009
- Preceded by: Bob Schaffer
- Succeeded by: Betsy Markey

Member of the Colorado Senate from the 1st district
- In office January 6, 1999 – January 8, 2003
- Preceded by: Don Ament
- Succeeded by: Mark Hillman

Member of the Colorado House of Representatives from the 65th district
- In office January 4, 1995 – January 6, 1999
- Preceded by: Robert Eisenach
- Succeeded by: Don Ament

Personal details
- Born: Marilyn Neoma Shuler; January 27, 1949 (age 77) Greeley, Colorado, U.S.
- Party: Republican
- Spouse: Steven Musgrave
- Education: Colorado State University (BA)

Marilyn Neoma Musgrave (née Shuler; born January 27, 1949), is an American politician and a former Republican member of the United States House of Representatives who served from 2003 to 2009, representing the 4th District of Colorado.

Musgrave served on the Agriculture and Small Business Committees. In the 110th Congress, she served as Ranking Minority member of the Specialty Crops, Rural Development, and Foreign Agriculture subcommittee. She also served as the Region Two representative for the Republican Steering Committee. She was the first Republican woman elected to Congress from Colorado.

Musgrave lost her seat in 2008 to Democratic challenger Betsy Markey by a 56 to 44 percent margin.

After leaving office in 2009, Musgrave worked for the Susan B. Anthony List, a non-profit that supports anti-abortion women in politics.

== Background and early political career ==
Musgrave was born Marilyn Neoma Shuler in Greeley, Colorado. She graduated from Eaton High School in 1968, and attended Colorado State University (CSU) in Fort Collins, graduating with a B.A. in social studies in 1972. Musgrave married while attending CSU. She and her husband Steve Musgrave settled in Fort Morgan, south of Greeley, where they owned and operated a bale stacking business. Musgrave also taught school. The Musgraves have four children and eight grandchildren.

Musgrave's career in elective office began in 1991, when she served one term on the Fort Morgan School Board, where she focused on changing the local sex education curriculum to abstinence-only. She was also involved in the Fort Morgan Right To Life chapter, at one time serving as its president. Musgrave was then elected to the Colorado State House of Representatives in 1992, and served there until after her successful 1998 campaign for a Colorado State Senate seat. While serving in the state senate, Musgrave was selected the Senate Republican Caucus Chairman. In 2002, Musgrave ran for the Fourth Congressional District seat being vacated by Bob Schaffer.

Musgrave is a devout Pentecostal (she is a member of the Assemblies of God), and was one of three Pentecostals serving in the 110th Congress. The others—Republicans—were Tim Johnson of Illinois and Todd Tiahrt of Kansas.

Musgrave was one of the most conservative members of the state legislature, often sparring with more socially moderate and liberal legislators. She focused her time on social issues. She staunchly opposed granting civil unions and marriage for same-sex couples. In another area she was active on small business and agricultural issues, particularly authoring bills to exempt farm equipment dealers from sales tax and lowering taxes on small business.

== Election history ==
=== 2002 election ===
In 2002, after Congressman Bob Schaffer retired, Musgrave ran for and won the Republican nomination to succeed him. Her opponent was businessman Jeff Bedingfield. She received a big boost in the primary when she gained the endorsements of Schaffer and former Senator William Armstrong.

In November 2002 Musgrave defeated Democratic State Senate President Stan Matsunaka 55% to 42%. She had been favored most of the way due to her large campaign war chest and the district's traditional Republican lean (it had been in Republican hands since 1973).

=== 2004 re-election ===
In 2004, Musgrave faced Matsunaka again. Matsunaka attacked Musgrave as a "one-trick pony," referring to her focus on outlawing same-sex marriage (see below). He also claimed that Musgrave neglected the 4th's needs and provided poor constituent services.

In the end, Musgrave held her seat by taking 51% of the vote to Matsunaka's 45%. Musgrave won most of the counties in this large and mostly rural district by margins of 2-to-1 or more. However, 85% of the district's vote is cast in two counties which account for only a third of its land—Larimer (home to Fort Collins) and Weld (home to Greeley). Musgrave lost Larimer County by 4,100 votes. She also lost the district's share of Boulder County, including Longmont. She was only able to hold onto her seat by winning Weld County by 15 points (almost 10,000 votes)—far larger than the overall margin of victory.

While Matsunaka only entered the race in May and raised around $800,000, Musgrave was heavily targeted by a 527 group funded by Colorado activists such as Tim Gill. The ads featured an actress dressed up like Musgrave picking a corpse's pocket and stealing from a soldier in combat.

=== 2006 re-election ===
In 2006, Musgrave was chalelnged for re-election by State Representative Angie Paccione, the Democratic nominee, and Eric Eidsness, a Reform Party candidate, who had previously considered a Republican Party primary challenge to Musgrave but later decided to become a Democrat.

The election was even tighter than the last. Musgrave won a third term by only 5,984 votes, taking 45.61% of the vote to Paccione's 43.12% and Eidsness' 11.28%. She lost Larimer County by an even larger margin than in 2004. However, Musgrave won Weld County by just under 6,700 votes/

=== 2008 campaign ===
Musgrave ran for a fourth term in the 2008 election, held on November 4, 2008. Her opponent was Betsy Markey, the regional director for Senator Ken Salazar in the 4th.

Musgrave was soundly defeated, taking only 44 percent of the vote to Markey's 56 percent—the second-largest margin of defeat for a Republican incumbent in the 2008 cycle, after Florida's Tom Feeney. In a repeat of 2004 and 2006, she easily won most of the rural counties in her district while losing badly in Larimer County—this time by 32,300 votes. She lost Weld County by 5,700 votes after having carried it in her previous bids, sealing her defeat.

After her defeat, Musgrave would not comment on the election results with the media, nor would she concede the race or contact Markey to congratulate her. She later recorded a robocall for Republican Georgia senator Saxby Chambliss, saying that she was defeated by "leftist special interests" who "smothered the truth with vicious attacks and lies."

== Political ideology ==
The American Conservative Union ranked Musgrave as the most conservative member of the House, with a 99 lifetime rating. The National Journal ranked her as the 28th most conservative member based on her 2007 votes. Her original House Website contained the phrase, "Defending our way of life through conservative leadership." She was a member of the conservative Republican Study Committee House caucus and its "Values Action Team." In 2005, Musgrave received the "Distinguished Christian Statesman" award from D. James Kennedy's Center for Christian Statesmanship.

Other political groups that Musgrave is allied with include the National Right to Life Committee, Focus on the Family, Alliance for Marriage, the Family Research Council, the National Taxpayers Union, the Christian Coalition, and the Traditional Values Coalition. Musgrave has taken trips sponsored by The Heritage Foundation and Club for Growth.

Following her defeat in 2008, Musgrave began working for the Susan B. Anthony List, an anti-abortion organization.

=== Same-sex marriage ===
Musgrave sponsored of the unsuccessful Federal Marriage Amendment in the 108th and 109th Congresses, originally drafted by the Alliance for Marriage. This proposed constitutional amendment would define marriage as "the union of a man and a woman" and bar any recognition of same-sex marriage or "legal incidents thereof" in the United States.

In a September 2006 speech to the Family Research Council's "Values Voters Summit", Musgrave said, "as we face the issues that we are facing today, I don't think there's anything more important out there than the marriage issue." Musgrave later distanced herself from these claims during the 2006 election.

=== Abortion ===
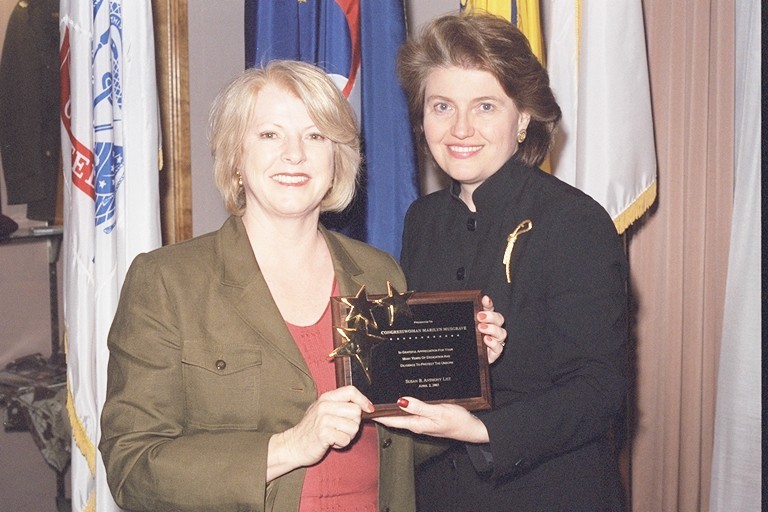
Musgrave (left) receives an anti-abortion Susan B. Anthony Award from Jane Abraham.

Musgrave is anti-abortion, staunchly opposing elective abortion. At the national level, she has supported the Partial Birth Abortion Ban and the Child Custody Protection Act. Musgrave is an original cosponsor of the Child Interstate Abortion Notification Act. She received the support of the Susan B. Anthony List as a candidate and now works for the organization.

Musgrave opposes public funding for embryonic stem cell research on abortion-related grounds, and was a vocal proponent of the 2005 congressional intervention into the Terri Schiavo case:

When we talk about a permanent vegetative state, I am offended by that. Terri smiles and acknowledges the people that love her when they come to see her. She cries when they leave. How heartless are we to call somebody like Terri Schiavo a vegetable? What are we thinking?
When we think about this case, we need to think about the message that we are sending to our children and our grandchildren. What we do in this Chamber tonight is as important as anything we have done in defending our Nation, in doing the things that we do as Members of Congress.

Musgrave weighed in on the Emergency Contraception controversy. On July 25, 2005, Musgrave criticized a witness at a congressional subcommittee hearing who had claimed she was "humiliated and discriminated against" at a pharmacist's refusal to fill a prescription for emergency contraception, claiming that it was only an issue of "inconvenience" to be denied emergency contraception. In 2003, a Musgrave submitted an amendment to the Runaway, Homeless, and Missing Children Protection Act, which would have prevented distribution of contraception to runaway teen. The amendment was not part of the final legislation

=== Second Amendment rights ===
Musgrave strongly opposes gun control and successfully passed an amendment prohibiting the enforcement of a federal requirement to sell trigger locks with all handguns. She is the founder of the 2nd Amendment Caucus and is working to protect gun manufacturers and dealers from certain types of lawsuits.

Musgrave is a close ally of the Gun Owners of America (GOA). Another close ally of Musgrave's from her state legislative days is Dudley Brown, who directs the Colorado wing of the GOA, the Rocky Mountain Gun Owners. On September 25, 2004, Musgrave was a special guest speaker at the 19th annual Gun Rights Policy Conference awards luncheon, where she was named "Gun Rights Legislator of the Year."

=== Home schooling ===
Musgrave advocates changing the laws to lend more support to families who home-school their children. According to her website, she believes that government intrudes too much on family affairs. Musgrave home schooled one of her children, as well.

Musgrave is closely linked to the Home School Legal Defense Association (HSLDA). Also, members of Generation Joshua, an HSLDA branch that tries to involve youth in politics, were sent to Musgrave's district in the final hours of the 2006 campaign.

=== Workforce and economy ===
Musgrave is one of the staunchest proponents of national Right to Work legislation, and was a cosponsor of The National Right to Work Act. Musgrave was heavily targeted by labor unions in the 2006 election. National Right to Work Legal Defense Foundation president Mark Mix held a fundraiser for Musgrave at New York's Harvard Club in 2006. After Hurricane Katrina in 2005, Musgrave helped lead the effort to urge President Bush to suspend "Davis-Bacon" prevailing wage protection in the Gulf Coast region. (Bush was quickly forced to rescind this suspension.)

=== Taxes ===
Musgrave is a strong supporter of income tax cuts, and supports making the 2001 federal tax cuts permanent. She also supports the elimination of the Estate tax and has voted to reduce tariffs on imported goods.

=== Religion and public law ===
In June 2006, Musgrave sponsored a resolution in Congress to declare 2007 as "National Year of the Bible". The resolution text requested that President Bush issue a proclamation calling on all citizens to "rediscover and apply the priceless and timeless message of the Bible" and encourage them to join the U.S. Federal government in celebrating the year with Bible "programs, ceremonies, and activities." The resolution died in committee.

In June 2005, Musgrave cited Coral Ridge Ministries founder D. James Kennedy, a minister, evangelist and Christian social conservative leader, as one of her inspirations to enter politics:

When I first started listening to D. James Kennedy on Truths That Transform," she said, "I was so encouraged that there was a minister of the Gospel that said what was right and what was wrong, and what our responsibility was as Christians in this great nation. Those kind of things just grew in me through the years, and then, here I am [today] voting on moral issues. I just want to say to the Christian Statesman staff, Dr. Kennedy is a hero for me.

In the 2002 Republican primary debate with opponent Jeff Beddingfield in Greeley, Colorado, Musgrave stated that the First Amendment does not offer "freedom from religion." In a 2003 interview with Today's Pentecostal Evangel, Musgrave explained how her religious beliefs play a key function in her public position:

The problems in our culture are just symptoms of spiritual problems in our nation. We must return to God and biblical principles for answers. There are limitations to what we can do, but I'm so thankful I have a voice and a vote.

In March 2007, Musgrave joined the Congressional Prayer Caucus, which was chaired by J. Randy Forbes. Forbes states the organization's purpose is to "build a spiritual wall around America."

In May 2007, Musgrave participated in a "Bible Reading Marathon" event on the West Front of the US Capitol.

=== Other issues ===
Musgrave is a staunch advocate of a federal prohibition of online poker. In 2006, she cosponsored H.R. 4777, the Internet Gambling Prohibition Act. In June 2008, Musgrave voted with the House Democrats and a minority of Republicans to save energy though the use of public transportation.

== Interest group ratings ==
The NRA Political Victory Fund gave Musgrave an 'A' for her support of pro-gun issues facing Congress. The NRA-PVF states than an 'A' for Musgrave indicates that she is solidly 'pro-gun' and that she has "supported NRA positions on key votes."

The Center for Christian Statesmanship, founded by D. James Kennedy of Coral Ridge Ministries, awarded Musgrave the "Distinguished Christian Statesman Award" in 2005.

The Christian Coalition has ranked Musgrave's voting record at '100%' in support of the pro-Christian Coalition legislation listed on their scorecard. The Christian Coalition was founded in 1989 by Pat Robertson and is dedicated to helping give conservative Christians a voice in their government.

== Electoral history ==
2002 United States House of Representatives elections
Party	Candidate	Votes	%
Republican	Marilyn Musgrave	115,359	54.95
Democratic	Stan Matsunaka	87,499	41.68
Libertarian	John Volz	7,097	3.37
Total votes		209,955	100.0
Republican hold			

2004 United States House of Representatives elections
Party	Candidate	Votes	%
Republican	Marilyn Musgrave (incumbent)	155,958	51.05
Democratic	Stan Matsunaka	136,812	44.78
Green	Bob Kinsey	12,739	4.17
Total votes		305,509	100.0
Republican hold			

2006 United States House of Representatives elections
Party	Candidate	Votes	%
Republican	Marilyn Musgrave (incumbent)	109,732	45.61
Democratic	Angie Paccione	103,748	43.11
Reform	Eric Eidsness	27,133	11.28
Total votes		240,613	100.0
Republican hold			

2008 United States House of Representatives elections
Party	Candidate	Votes	%
Democratic	Betsy Markey	187,348	56%
Republican	Marilyn Musgrave (incumbent)	146,030	44%
Total votes		333,378	100%
Democratic gain from Republican			

U.S. House of Representatives
Preceded by Bob Schaffer	Member of the U.S. House of Representatives from Colorado's 4th congressional district 2003–2009	Succeeded by Betsy Markey
U.S. order of precedence (ceremonial)
Preceded by Bob Schaffer as Former U.S. Representative	Order of precedence of the United States as Former U.S. Representative	Succeeded by John Salazar as Former U.S. Representative
