= Randy Fischer =

American politician (born c.1951)

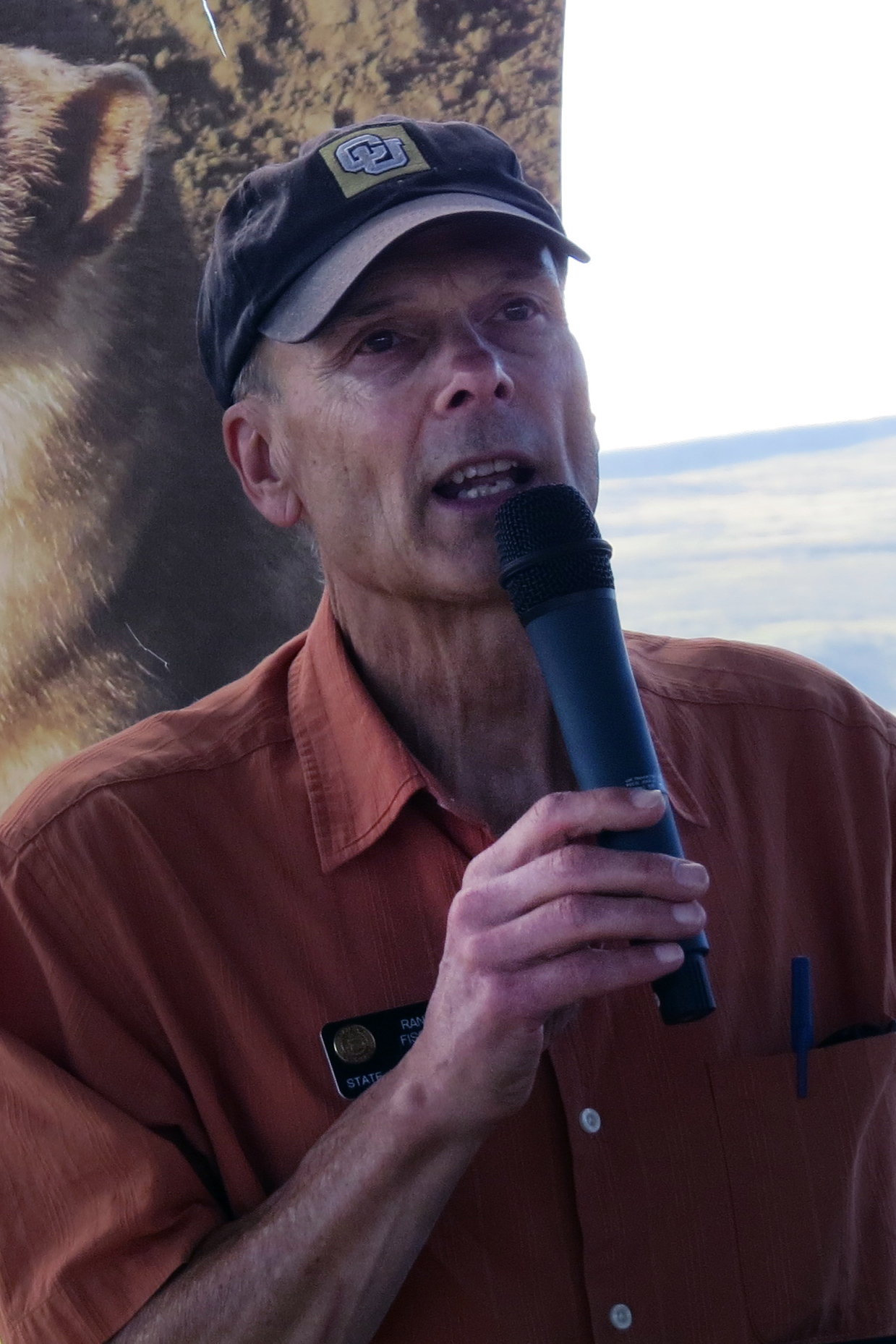

Member of the Colorado House of Representatives from the 53rd district
- In office January 10, 2007 – January 7, 2015
- Preceded by: Angie Paccione
- Succeeded by: Jennifer Arndt

Personal details
- Born: c. 1951 Fort Collins, Colorado
- Party: Democratic
- Spouse: Kathy
- Profession: Engineer

Randy Fischer (born c. 1951) is a former legislator in the U.S. state of Colorado. An engineering consultant with a background in natural resources, Fischer was first elected as a Democrat in 2006 to the Colorado House of Representatives, Fischer represented House District 53, which encompasses the western half of Fort Collins, Colorado. In the legislature, Fischer sponsored legislation relating to uranium mining and also focused on water and environmental issues. In the house, he served for a time as Deputy Majority Whip and chair of the Agriculture and Natural Resources committees. Term limited, he did not seek re-election in 2014, and his term ended in early January, 2015.

== Biography ==
=== Early life and education ===
A third-generation Coloradan born and raised in Fort Collins, Fischer attended Colorado State University, earning a bachelor's degree in natural resource management in 1976. Upon graduation, he was named Outstanding Graduating Senior for the College of Natural Resources; he later served on the CSU College of Natural Resources Alumni Board. He went on to earn a master's degree in civil engineering from Colorado State in 1989.

=== Career and public service ===
During his time at CSU, he worked for the Poudre School District's Outdoor Education Program, and has since worked in the fields of construction, and agriculture, including a stint as a professional beekeeper. He currently runs an engineering consulting firm, specializing in abandoned mine cleanup and acid mine drainage.

Fischer served on a number of local boards and commissions, primarily dealing with natural resources and land use issues, including the Larimer County Rural Land Use Advisory Board, the City of Fort Collins' Water Board, Storm Drainage Board, Natural Resources Advisory Board, and City Plan Update Committee, and on the board of the Legacy Land Trust. His wife, Kathy, is a former high school teacher; they have lived in Fort Collins for over 30 years.

== Legislative career ==
=== 2006 election ===
After having worked on campaigns for Fort Collins city council and the Larimer County Board of Commissioners, Fischer first ran for public office in 2006, seeking the legislative seat being vacated by Congressional candidate Angie Paccione. He took 59 percent of the vote in a four-way race against Republican Anne Yeldell, Libertarian Mark Brophy, and Constitution Party candidate Darren Morrison.

=== 2007 legislative session ===
In the 2007 session of the Colorado General Assembly, Fischer sits on the House Agriculture, Livestock, and Natural Resources Committee and the House Education Committee. .

Shortly after his election, Fischer identified "education, health care and renewable energy" as his top legislative priorities. During the 2007 session, Fischer sponsored legislation which would allow counties to enforce stormwater regulations.

Following the regular session, Fischer served on the legislature's interim committee on allocation of severance tax and federal mineral lease revenues.

=== 2008 legislative session ===
In the 2008 session of the Colorado General Assembly, Fischer sits on the House Agriculture, Livestock, and Natural Resources Committee and the House Education Committee. In the 2008 legislative session, Fischer plans to sponsor legislation to direct severance tax revenue to the Colorado departments of Wildlife and Parks and Recreation. Fischer has also sponsored a bill to expand funding for the Colorado Water Resources Research Institute and to create a statewide collaboratory for water-related research. He has also introduced legislation designed to protect instream water rights for users who choose to let water flow downstream rather than be diverted, which was passed and signed into law by Gov. Ritter.

Another bill, requiring vehicle registration and emissions testing for mobile diesel equipment, including farm and construction vehicles, was opposed by farmers, contractors, and local governments, and was stripped of penalties for noncompliance in committee. In response, Fischer proposed a revised version of the legislation which would use registration fees to create a fund for replacement of polluting vehicles with cleaner vehicles.

Together with Rep. John Kefalas and other northern Colorado legislators, Fischer has sponsored two bills to regulate uranium mining, in response to proposed mining activity in northern Colorado; the legislation has been opposed by mining companies. After some amendment, one of these bills, strengthening water quality requirements, passed the state legislature and was signed into law; another measure, which would have created stronger public disclosure requirements for mining operations, was killed in committee, but later revived in the state senate.

Prompted by a suggestion from a Fort Collins high school student, Fischer has floated legislation which would require teen drivers holding a learner's permit to display a decal in the rear windows of their vehicles; the suggestion was not supported by an interim legislative committee on transportation.

=== 2008 election ===
Fischer announced his bid for re-election to the state legislature in January 2008. He faces a challenge from Republican Donna Gallup in the November 2008 general election. Gallup notably criticized Fischer's support of restrictions on uranium mining, accusing him of having "played on constituents’ fears." During the campaign, Fischer cited water, transportation, and higher education as top priorities for a second term in office and emphasized fiscal restraint in the state budget process. Fischer significantly outraised Gallup, including several large donations from political action committees; in mid-October, his campaign had roughly $38,000 cash on hand, and his re-election bid was endorsed by the Denver Post, the Windsor Beacon, and the Fort Collins Coloradoan. Fischer won re-election, defeating Gallup with 63 percent of the popular vote.

=== 2009 legislative session ===
For the 2009 legislative session, Fischer was named to seats on the House Transportation and Energy Committee and the House Agriculture and Natural Resources Committee, where he served as vice-chair. After winning a second term, Fischer was also elected Deputy Majority Whip by state house Democrats in an unopposed race for the leadership position.

In response to disputes between the municipalities of Fort Collins and Timnath, Fischer sponsored legislation regarding regional land-use planning, legislation to prevent vacant or agricultural land from being included within urban renewal authorities, and legislation to create a statewide electronics recycling program. Fischer was also a strong supporter of legislation to prohibit texting while driving; after unsuccessfully pushing for dialing of phone numbers to be included in the texting ban, he pledged to introduced legislation to create stronger restrictions in the next legislative session.

=== 2010 legislative session ===
After Rep. Kathleen Curry left the Democratic Party in December 2009, Fischer was tapped to chair of the House Agriculture and Natural Resources Committee the week before the beginning of the 2010 legislative session.

=== 2012 election ===
In the 2012 General Election, Representative Fischer faced Republican challenger Jon Fye. Fischer was elected by a wide margin of 64% to 36%.
