= John Kefalas =

American politician (born 1954)

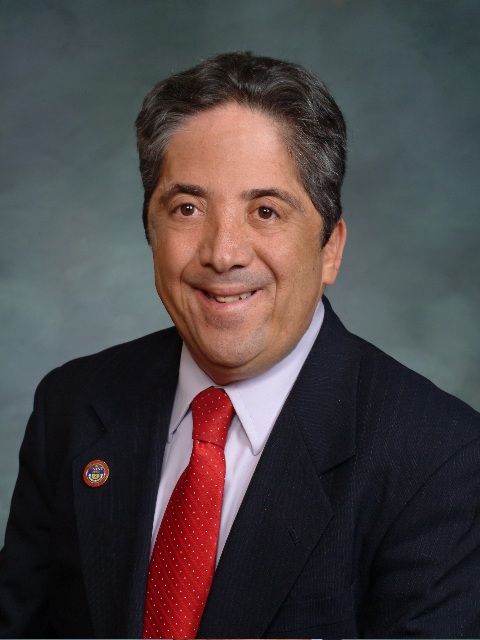

Member of the Colorado Senate from the 14th district
- In office 2013 – January 4, 2019
- Preceded by: Bob Bacon
- Succeeded by: Joann Ginal

Member of the Colorado House of Representatives from the 52nd district
- In office January 10, 2007 – November 6, 2012
- Preceded by: Bob McCluskey
- Succeeded by: Joann Ginal

Personal details
- Born: December 26, 1954 (age 71) Piraeus, Greece
- Party: Democratic
- Spouse: Beth
- Profession: Activist, Legislator

John Michael Kefalas (born December 26, 1954) is a politician in the U.S. state of Colorado. An educator and lobbyist before first running for the legislature in 2004, Kefalas defeated a Republican incumbent to win election to the Colorado House of Representatives as a Democrat in 2006. Kefalas won election to the State Senate in 2012 and represented Senate District 14 until early 2019. In 2018, Kefalas ran for and won a seat on the Larimer County Board of County Commissioners. He resigned his Senate seat, and a vacancy committee nominated Joann Ginal to replace him.

== Biography ==
=== Early life, education, and career ===
Born in Piraeus, Greece, Kefalas earned a bachelor's degree in botany from Colorado State University in 1978 and then joined the Peace Corps in 1979, serving as an agricultural extension worker in El Salvador. After returning to the United States, he earned a master's degree in teaching, with a secondary science specialization from Fairleigh Dickinson University in 1982 and taught in the Poudre School District. He has also worked as an employment counselor for Larimer County, Colorado, and as a health outreach worker.

=== Public service and volunteerism ===
From 1997 to 2004, Kefalas worked as a public policy advocate and community development coordinator for Catholic Charities until his departure amidst a controversy regarding his public support for Roe v. Wade and abortion rights during his 2004 legislative campaign. Before entering the legislature, he directed the Colorado Progressive Coalition's Tax Fairness Project. He has served as a member of the Fort Collins Housing Authority and the Colorado Social Legislation Committee, and, in 2001, won the City of Fort Collins Human Relations Award.

From 1980 to 1994, Kefalas redirected a portion of his federal income taxes to charitable organizations as a protest against United States military actions in Central America. He has paid his income taxes in full since 1994, but continued to boycott the federal telephone excise tax as recently as 2004. As a result, Kefalas has had a lien filed him and has had wages garnished. Kefalas has paid his back taxes and considers his actions to be a conscientious protest. He has also written about his experience of "war tax resistance" for the newsletter of the National War Tax Resistance Coordinating Committee. In both his 2004 and 2006 legislative campaigns, Kefalas was accused of avoiding his federal tax obligation, both by his Republican opponent and by independent political committees. Kefalas has also been an outspoken opponent of the Iraq War, and has engaged in non-violent civil disobedience in protest of the war.

Kefalas is married; he and his wife Beth have two sons — Harlan, an active-duty U.S. Army soldier who has served in Iraq, Kosovo, and Afghanistan, and Timothy, the coach of the Colorado State University ultimate frisbee team.

== Legislative career ==
=== 2004 and 2006 campaigns ===
Kefalas first ran for the state legislature in 2004, winning the Democratic Party primary by only seven votes over Fort Collins councilman Bill Bertschy after a recount process that lasted for several weeks. Kefalas lost the general election by fewer than 500 votes to incumbent Republican Bob McCluskey in a race that also included Libertarian Party candidate Jassen Bowman. Kefalas ran unchallenged for the Democratic nomination in 2006, and narrowly prevailed over McCluskey in the general election.

=== 2007 legislative session ===
In the 2007-2008 session of the Colorado General Assembly, Kefalas sat on the House Finance Committee and the House Health and Human Services Committee.

While in the legislature, he sponsored successful bills to encourage state purchasing of "environmentally preferable" products, to allow Colorado State University to require graduate student health insurance, and to create licensing standards for hemodialysis technicians.

Kefalas proposed a bill to explore alternative voting systems, which was defeated in committee, but which led to the creation of an 11-member multi-partisan task force to study related issues. Another of Kefalas' proposed bills, which would have required the Colorado Department of Revenue to regularly report on tax burdens across individual income groups, was also defeated in committee.

During his first year in the legislature, Kefalas also founded the bipartisan Common Good Caucus to address poverty issues, and was a member of the Hispanic Caucus and the Diabetes/Obesity Caucus.

=== 2008 legislative session ===
In the 2008 session of the Colorado General Assembly, Kefalas sat on the House Finance Committee and the House Health and Human Services Committee. Representative Kefalas was joined by chief of staff Anne Bellows, a legal and civil rights expert. For the 2008 legislative session, Kefalas worked with other Fort Collins legislators, particularly Rep. Randy Fischer, on bills to increase scrutiny of proposed uranium mining operations. While one bill, which would require that groundwater quality be restored following mining operations, passed the state legislature and was signed into law, another measure, which would have created stronger public disclosure requirements for mining operations, was killed in committee, but later revived in the state senate.

With Sen. Ron Tupa, Kefalas was the house sponsor of legislation designed to reduce the cost of college textbooks by requiring textbook publishers to disclose costs and offer textbooks unbundled from additional materials, and he sponsored legislation to allow outpatient surgery centers to establish peer review committees; both bills were signed into law by Gov. Ritter. For his support of ambulatory surgical centers, Kefalas was awarded the Legislator of the Year Award by the Colorado Ambulatory Surgery Center Association later that year.

Kefalas also sponsored a bill to authorize local pilot tests of ranked choice voting methods. Kefalas sponsored a bill to establish a Colorado Housing Investment Fund, but withdrew the bill when proponents moved forward with a similar ballot initiative. He later expressed frustration when plans for the ballot measure were withdrawn. Building on his 2007 bill to allow purchasing of "green" products, Kefalas also sponsored a measure to require Colorado governments to consider products' expected life and cost of ownership in making purchasing decisions, which was signed into law.

Among Kefalas' top priorities is restoring and expanding Colorado's earned income tax credit, a move which met with resistance from legislative leaders in 2007 due to budget constraints. Kefalas introduced a bill in the 2008 session to restore Colorado's EITC at ten percent of the federal credit, but the bill was defeated in a House committee.

=== 2008 election ===
Holding office in a closely contested district, Kefalas was expected to be targeted by Colorado Republicans during his 2008 re-election bid, which he formally announced in January 2008. Since taking office, Kefalas sought to maintain a dialogue with constituents by leading a series of monthly "community conversations" on topics ranging from health care to mobile home parks, and named sustainable economic development his top priority in office.

Former Rep. Bob McCluskey announced his intention to run against Kefalas in February 2008, pitting the two against each other for the third time in as many election cycles and creating a competitive race in what was seen as one of Colorado's "swing" districts.

During the campaign, Kefalas held a fundraising advantage over McCluskey, with $60,000 cash on hand — three times as much as McCluskey — in mid-September. By late October, Kefalas had raised over $100,000, about $15,000 short of McCluskey's fundraising total; which included $65,000 that McCluskey donated to his own campaign.

McCluskey targeted Kefalas with a direct mail advertisement blaming Kefalas and the Democratic state legislature for high gasoline prices, a tactic Kefalas dismissed as "negative campaigning." Kefalas also condemned independent ads attacking McCluskey's legislative record as having "crossed the line of civility." The 527 group Accountability for Colorado also spent over $50,000 in support of Kefalas' re-election, including mailers attacking McCluskey's legislative record; Kefalas also expressed disapproval of these advertisements.

McCluskey's bid to unseat Kefalas was endorsed by the Denver Post, while Kefalas was endorsed by the Windsor Beacon and the Fort Collins Coloradoan. Kefalas ultimately won a second term with about 59 percent of the popular vote, becoming the first Democrat to win re-election in the east Fort Collins district since 1936.

=== 2009 legislative session ===
For the 2009 legislative session, Kefalas was named to seats on the House Appropriations Committee, the House Finance Committee, and the House Health and Human Services Committee. Kefalas has named health care reform as his top priority and planned on introducing legislation to create a single-payer universal health care system in Colorado during the 2009 session. The bill was introduced as a proposal to create a 23-member commission to make recommendations as to how to implement a single-payer system, and was reported favorably out of a House committee. However, Kefalas was one vote short of the 33 necessary to pass the legislation out of the house, and in April, asked that the legislation be killed.

Kefalas also sponsored the Colorado Innovation Investment Tax Credit, legislation to create $750,000 in tax credits for angel investors in startup companies, to increase support for job training programs, and to create a Colorado Railroad Authority to begin planning for statewide passenger rail service.

Kefalas also sponsored legislation to create an Economic Opportunity/Poverty Reduction Task Force, which he chaired following the regular session. The committee's objective is to develop plans to reduce Colorado's poverty rate by half in ten years, examining a broad range of issues from economic development to education to transportation to tax policy, and it considered potential legislation on topics ranging from the earned income tax credit to rent control.

Following the legislation session, Kefalas was the only male legislator honored with the Colorado Lawmakers Award by the Denver Women's Commission and the Colorado Women's Chamber of Commerce.

=== 2010 election ===
In August 2009, Kefalas announced his intention to seek a third term in the legislature in the November 2010 legislative elections. Kefalas was reelected with 57% of the vote.

=== 2012 election ===
Representative Kefalas announced that he would seek election to the state senate seat vacated by Bob Bacon. Kefalas' bid was endorsed by The Fort Collins Coloradoan and several former elected officials. In the 2012 General Election, Representative Kefalas faced Republican challenger Syndi Anderson for the open Senate seat. Kefalas was elected by a wide margin of 58% to 36% with the remainder of the vote going to third-party candidates. Senator Kefalas now represents the people of State Senate District 14.

=== 2016 election ===
Senator Kefalas successfully ran for re-election in 2016 against Republican challenger Hans Hochheimer. Kefalas was elected with 61.67% of the votes.

=== 2018 election ===
In 2018, Senator Kefalas ran for Larimer County Commissioner, District 1. The seat was originally held by Commissioner Lew Gaiter, who died in September 2018. After Lew Gaiter's death, the District 1 seat was filled by vacancy committee by Sean Dougherty. Kefalas was elected with 54.57% of the vote.

=== 2022 election ===
In January 2022, Commissioner Kefalas announced his intention to run for re-election for Larimer County Commissioner District 1.
