= Betsy Markey =

American politician (born 1956)

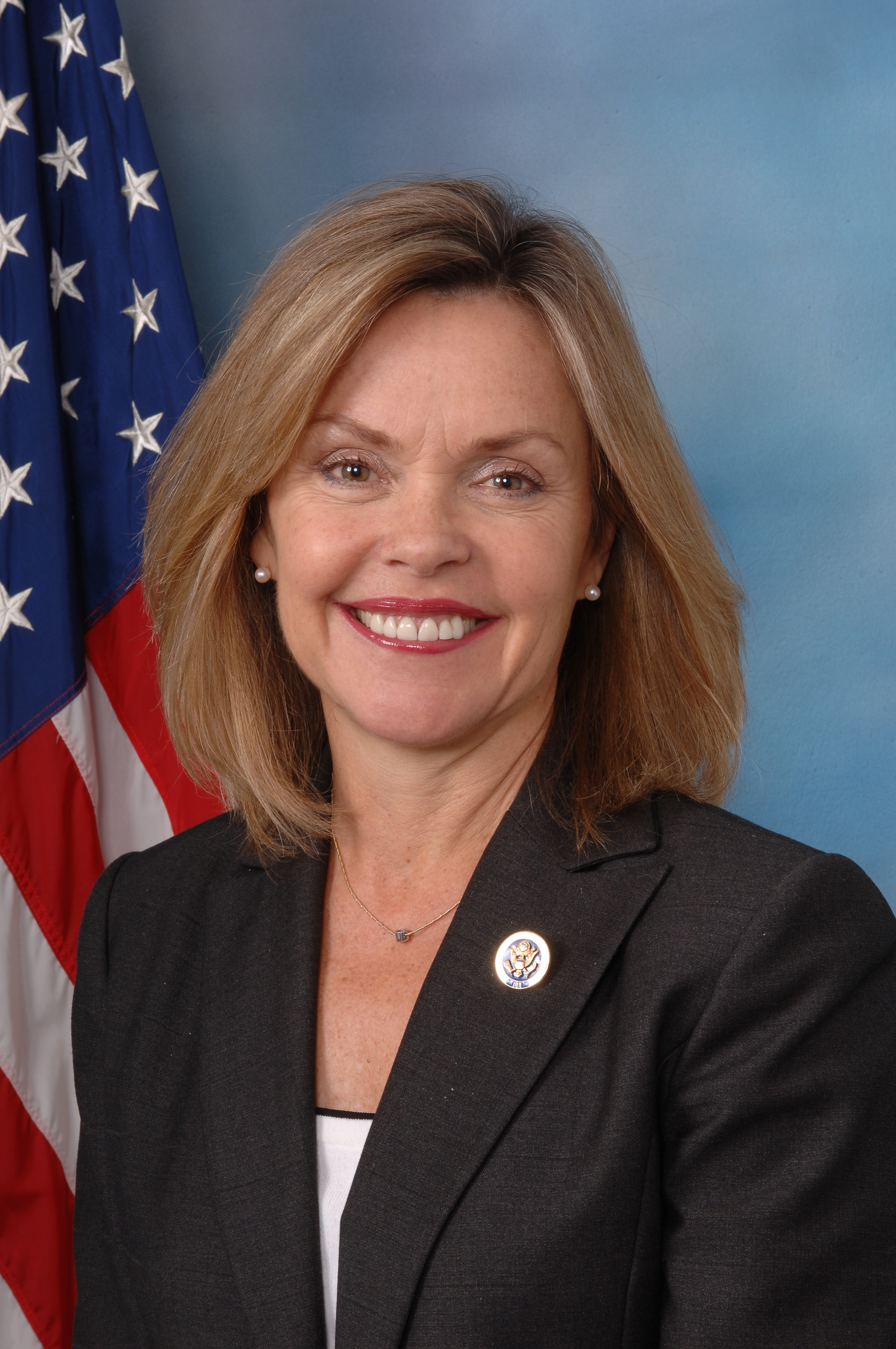
- Official portrait, 2009

U.S. Assistant Secretary of Homeland Security for Intergovernmental Affairs
- In office 2011–2013
- President: Barack Obama
- Preceded by: Juliette Kayyem
- Succeeded by: Philip McNamara

Member of the U.S. House of Representatives from Colorado's 4th district
- In office January 3, 2009 – January 3, 2011
- Preceded by: Marilyn Musgrave
- Succeeded by: Cory Gardner

Personal details
- Born: Elizabeth Helen Markey; April 27, 1956 (age 70) Cresskill, New Jersey, U.S.
- Party: Democratic
- Spouse: Jim Kelly
- Education: University of Florida (BA); American University (MPA)
- Website: House website (archived)

Elizabeth Helen Markey (born April 27, 1956) is a former American politician who served as a member of the United States House of Representatives for Colorado's 4th congressional district from 2009 to 2011. She also served as assistant secretary for intergovernmental affairs in the United States Department of Homeland Security. She is a member of the Democratic Party.

== Early life and education ==
Betsy Markey was born in Cresskill, New Jersey, as the sixth of seven children. Markey attended college at the University of Florida from 1974 through 1978. Her last semester was completed abroad at a university in Poznań, Poland. Markey completed a Masters of Public Administration in 1983 from American University.

== Career ==
After completing a degree in political science, Markey worked for a short period of time on the staff of U.S. Senator John A. Durkin (D-NH). She later went on to work for U.S. Congressman Herbert Harris (D-VA) as a caseworker/legislative assistant on one of the Congressman’s subcommittees. Markey was hired as a staff assistant to the vice president for development and planning at American University in 1981.

=== Public service ===
In 1983 Markey was selected to participate in the Presidential Management Fellows Program, a competitive two-year management program track in the federal government. Markey went on to hold positions in the United States Treasury Department as budget and program analyst, as human resources specialist, and as staff assistant to the deputy commissioner of the United States Customs Service.

In 1984, during the Reagan Administration, she was recruited by the United States Department of State to develop computer security policies for the newly formed Office of Information Systems Security. Markey served as director of computer security policy and training and worked with all bureaus to craft computer security policy. She created the department’s first comprehensive computer security training program for management, security personnel and support staff globally. For her work, Markey received the State Department’s Meritorious Honor Award. Markey left the Department in 1988 at the GS-14 level.

After leaving the State Department in 1988, Markey co-founded a software firm, Syscom Services. By 1995, Syscom ranked #99 in the Inc. 500 listing of America’s fastest-growing private companies.

In the mid-1990s, Markey was also the owner of Huckleberry’s, a successful and popular coffee and ice cream shop in Old Town Fort Collins, Colorado. She sold her small business in 2000.

Markey was hired as regional director of Colorado’s North Central and Eastern Plains for U.S. Senator Ken Salazar in January 2005. She resigned the position in May 2007. Markey announced her decision to run for United States House of Representatives for Colorado's 4th congressional district in June 2007.

== U.S. House of Representatives ==
=== Notable votes ===
In the 111th Congress, Markey voted for the Children's Health Insurance Program Reauthorization Act of 2009, the American Recovery and Reinvestment Act, an economic stimulus package, the American Clean Energy and Security Act, a cap-and-trade bill which ultimately did not pass. Markey also voted for the Patient Protection and Affordable Care Act, landmark health care reform legislation.

In his memoir, A Promise Land, Barack Obama described Markey as a promising and principled young House member who faced electoral defeat despite taking tough votes on critical issues such as healthcare and the Recovery Act, emphasizing Markey's commitment to her principles in the face of political challenges.

=== Committee assignments ===
- Committee on Agriculture
  - Subcommittee on Conservation, Credit, Energy, and Research
  - Subcommittee on General Farm Commodities and Risk Management
  - Subcommittee on Livestock, Dairy, and Poultry
- Committee on Transportation and Infrastructure
  - Subcommittee on Economic Development, Public Buildings and Emergency Management
  - Subcommittee on Highways and Transit
  - Subcommittee on Railroads, Pipelines, and Hazardous Materials

== Political campaigns ==
=== 2008 ===
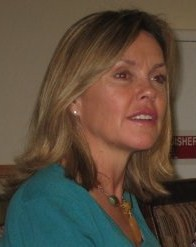
Markey meeting with constituents in Eastern Colorado

In June 2007, Markey filed a statement of candidacy with the Federal Election Commission, and formally announced her intention to run in Colorado’s Fourth Congressional District against Marilyn Musgrave. She quickly garnered numerous key supporters including many past and present elected officials.

The 4th District had been in Republican hands since 1973. It was generally considered a safe Republican district, but Musgrave was considered potentially vulnerable. The three-term incumbent had never been able to establish a secure footing in the district, in part because her Democratic opponents attacked her for her focus on social issues (such as the Federal Marriage Amendment) and her allegedly poor constituent services. After winning the open 4th District seat fairly easily in 2002, Musgrave had only narrowly held on in 2004 and 2006.

Another factor that made Democrats hopeful of defeating Musgrave was the district's demographics. The 4th is a large and mostly rural district. While the rural counties are some of the most Republican counties in Colorado, the district's politics were dominated by two counties--Larimer and Weld—home to Fort Collins and Greeley, respectively. These two counties have only a third of the district's land, but cast 85 percent of its vote. In 2004 and 2006, Musgrave had been able to win by running up the votes in Weld County.

In the 2008 election, Markey won by an unexpectedly wide margin, taking 56% of the vote to Musgrave's 44% the third largest margin of victory for a congressional challenger in the 2008 cycle. While Markey lost most of the rural counties in the district by margins of 2-to-1 or more, she crushed Musgrave in Larimer County, winning it by 36,500 votes. She also won Weld County by seven points.

=== 2010 ===
Markey was challenged by Republican nominee, state Representative Cory Gardner, American Constitutional Party nominee Doug Aden, and Independent Ken "Wasko" Waszkiewicz.

The race was rated as a toss-up per polling aggregation and was cited as one of the most competitive races in the nation. Markey was defeated in her reelection bid in 2010, taking only 41% of the vote to Gardner's 52%.

== Post-congressional career ==
After her defeat, Markey became Assistant Secretary for Intergovernmental Affairs in the United States Department of Homeland Security. She resigned that position in January 2013. In June 2013, she announced that she was running for Colorado State Treasurer in the 2014 elections. She won the Democratic nomination, but lost the general election to incumbent Walker Stapleton.

In January 2016, she was appointed as regional administrator for the Small Business Administration.

In December 2018, she was appointed as director of the Colorado Office of Economic Development and Trade. She announced her resignation in March 2021.

== Electoral history ==
2008 United States House of Representatives elections
| Party | Candidate | Votes | % |
|---|---|---|---|
| Democratic | Betsy Markey | 187,348 | 56% |
| Republican | Marilyn Musgrave (incumbent) | 146,030 | 44% |
| Total votes | | 333,378 | 100% |
| Democratic gain from Republican | | | |

2010 United States House of Representatives elections
| Party | Candidate | Votes | % |
|---|---|---|---|
| Republican | Cory Gardner | 138,634 | 52% |
| Democratic | Betsy Markey (incumbent) | 109,249 | 41% |
| Constitution | Doug Aden | 12,312 | 5% |
| No party | Ken "Wasko" Waszkiewicz | 3,986 | 2% |
| Total votes | | 264,181 | 100% |
| Republican gain from Democratic | | | |

== See also ==
- Women in the United States House of Representatives

U.S. House of Representatives
| Preceded by Marilyn Musgrave | Member of the U.S. House of Representatives from Colorado's 4th congressional district 2009–2011 | Succeeded by Cory Gardner |
U.S. order of precedence (ceremonial)
| Preceded by Ruben Kihuen as Former U.S. Representative | Order of precedence of the United States as Former U.S. Representative | Succeeded by Yadira Caraveo as Former U.S. Representative |
