= Jennifer Arndt =

American politician

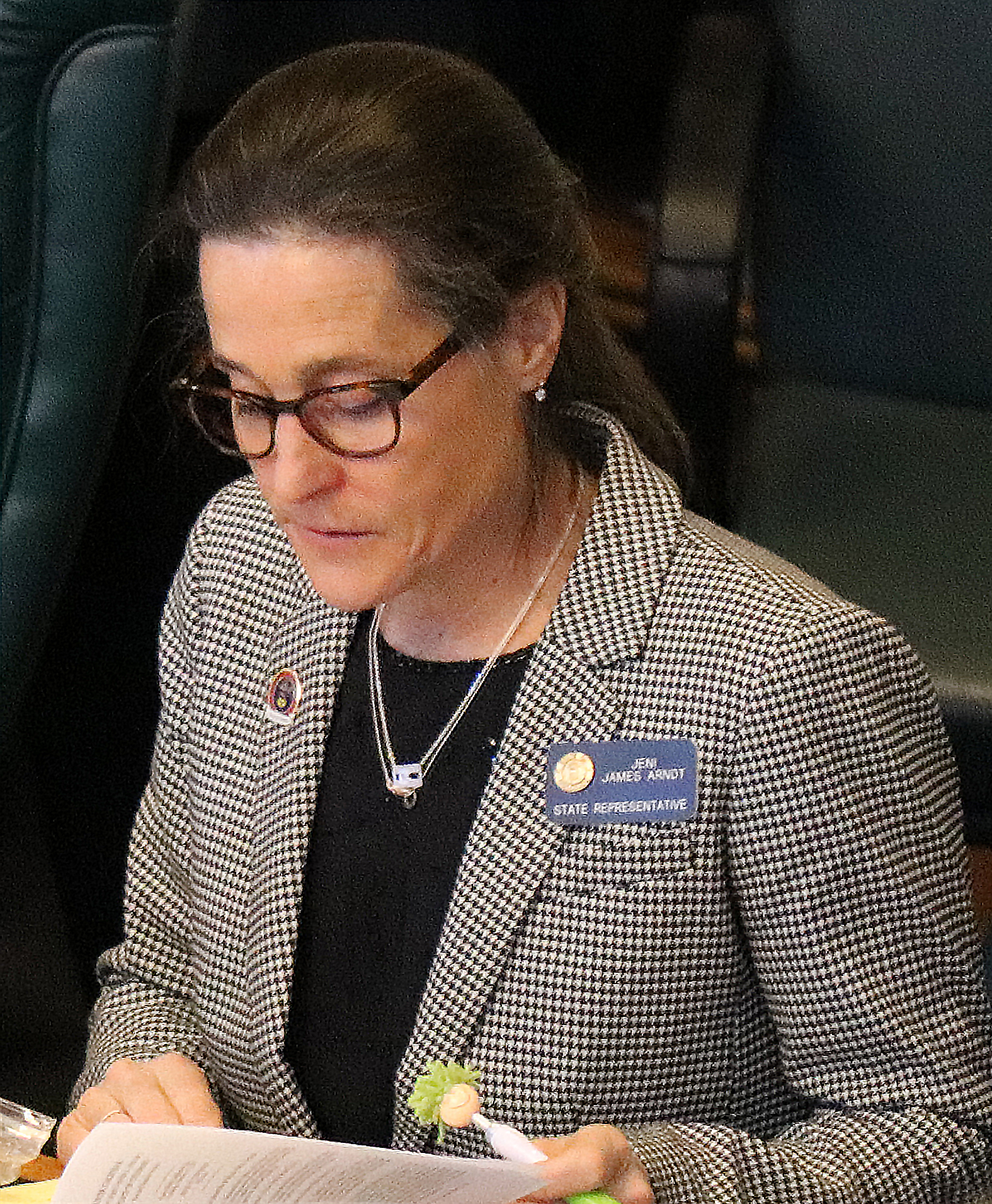

Mayor of Fort Collins, Colorado
- In office April 27, 2021 – January 13, 2026
- Preceded by: Wade Troxell
- Succeeded by: Emily Francis

Member of the Colorado House of Representatives from the 53rd district
- In office January 7, 2015 – April 16, 2021
- Preceded by: Randy Fischer
- Succeeded by: Andrew Boesenecker

Personal details
- Party: Democratic
- Other political affiliations: Forward (since 2023)
- Education: Colorado College (BA); University of Colorado Boulder (MA, MBA); Purdue University (MS, PhD)

Jennifer James "Jeni" Arndt is an American politician who served as the mayor of Fort Collins, Colorado from 2021 to 2026. She previously served in the Colorado House of Representatives, representing the 53rd district from 2015 to 2021.

== Early life and education ==
A native of Fort Collins, Colorado, Arndt graduated from Poudre High School. She earned a Bachelor of Arts degree in sociology from Colorado College, a Master of Arts in geography from the University of Colorado Boulder, a Master of Science in special education from Purdue University, a Master of Business Administration from the University of Colorado Boulder, and a PhD in curriculum and instruction from Purdue University.

== Career ==
Arndt is a former member of the Colorado House of Representatives from the 53rd District, serving from January 7, 2015, until her resignation on April 16, 2021. Arndt resigned a month after winning the Fort Collins mayoralty. She was replaced by Andrew Boesenecker after the Colorado Democrats opted to co-opt him in a vacancy committee. She was a member of the Democratic Party.

On December 30, 2020, Arndt announced that she was running for mayor of Fort Collins, Colorado in the April 6, 2021, election. Arndt won the race, defeating two opponents and winning about 63% of the total votes cast. She assumed office on April 27, 2021. On June 29, 2023, Mayor Arndt affiliated with the Forward Party. On November 7, 2023, she won reelection in Fort Collins. In March 2025, Arndt said she would not seek a third term as mayor. She was succeeded as mayor by Emily Francis.

== See also ==
- List of mayors of Fort Collins, Colorado
