= Hefley =

Hefley is an English surname. Notable people with the surname include:

- Joel Hefley (born 1935), American politician in Colorado
- Lynn Hefley, a former state legislator in Colorado, wife of Joel
- Nancy Bea Hefley (1936–2025), American stadium organist
