= 2000 United States House of Representatives elections in Colorado =

- November 7, 2000

All 6 Colorado seats to the United States House of Representatives
	Majority party	Minority party	Third party
Party	Republican	Democratic	Libertarian
Last election	4	2	0
Seats won	4	2	0
Seat change	Steady	Steady	Steady
Popular vote	968,651	496,045	85,806
Percentage	59.65%	30.55%	5.28%

Republican
40–50%
50–60%
60–70%
70–80%
80–90%
90–100%
Democratic
40–50%
50–60%
60–70%

The 2000 United States House of Representatives elections in Colorado were held on November 7, 2000, with all six House seats up for election. The winners served from January 3, 2001, to January 3, 2003.

== Overview ==
United States House of Representatives elections in Colorado, 2000
Party	Votes	Percentage	Seats	+/–
Republican	968,651	59.65%	4	-
Democratic	496,045	30.55%	2	-
Libertarian	85,806	5.28%	0	-
Natural Law	34,981	2.15%	0	-
Green	12,398	0.76%	0	-
Constitution	9,955	0.61%	0	-
Others	16,046	0.99%	0	-
Totals	1,623,882	100.00%	6	-

== Results ==
=== District 1 ===
2000 Colorado's 1st congressional district election
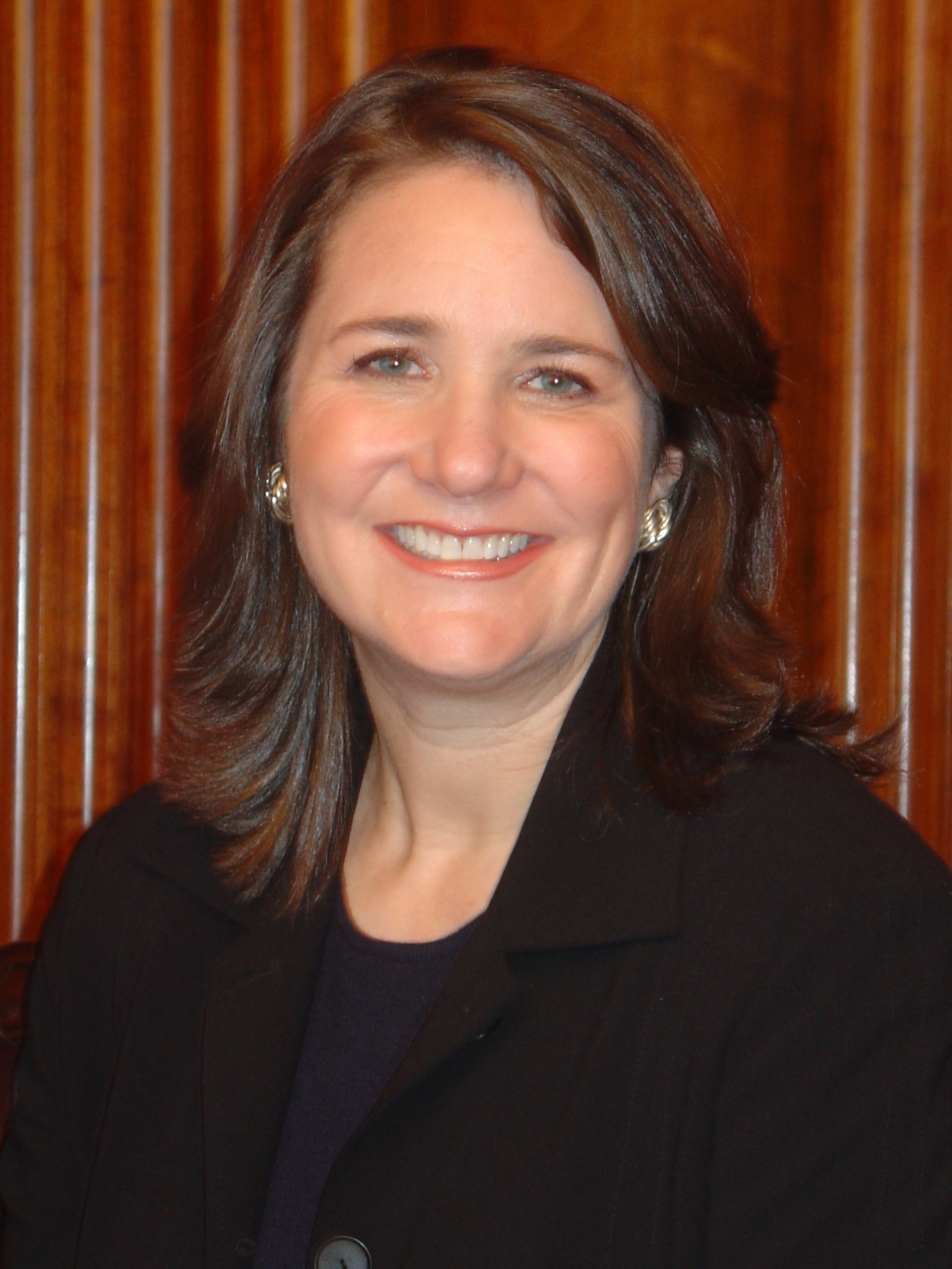

Nominee	Diana DeGette	Jesse L. Thomas
Party	Democratic	Republican
Popular vote	141,831	56,291
Percentage	68.7%	27.3%
U.S. Representative before election
Diana DeGette
Democratic
Elected U.S. Representative
Diana DeGette
Democratic

2000 Colorado's 1st congressional district election
Party	Candidate	Votes	%
Democratic	Diana DeGette (incumbent)	141,831	68.70%
Republican	Jesse L. Thomas	56,291	27.27%
Libertarian	Richard Combs	5,852	2.83%
Reform	Lyle Nasser	2,452	1.19%
Write-in		8	0.00%
Total votes		206,434	100.00%
Democratic hold			

=== District 2 ===
2000 Colorado's 2nd congressional district election
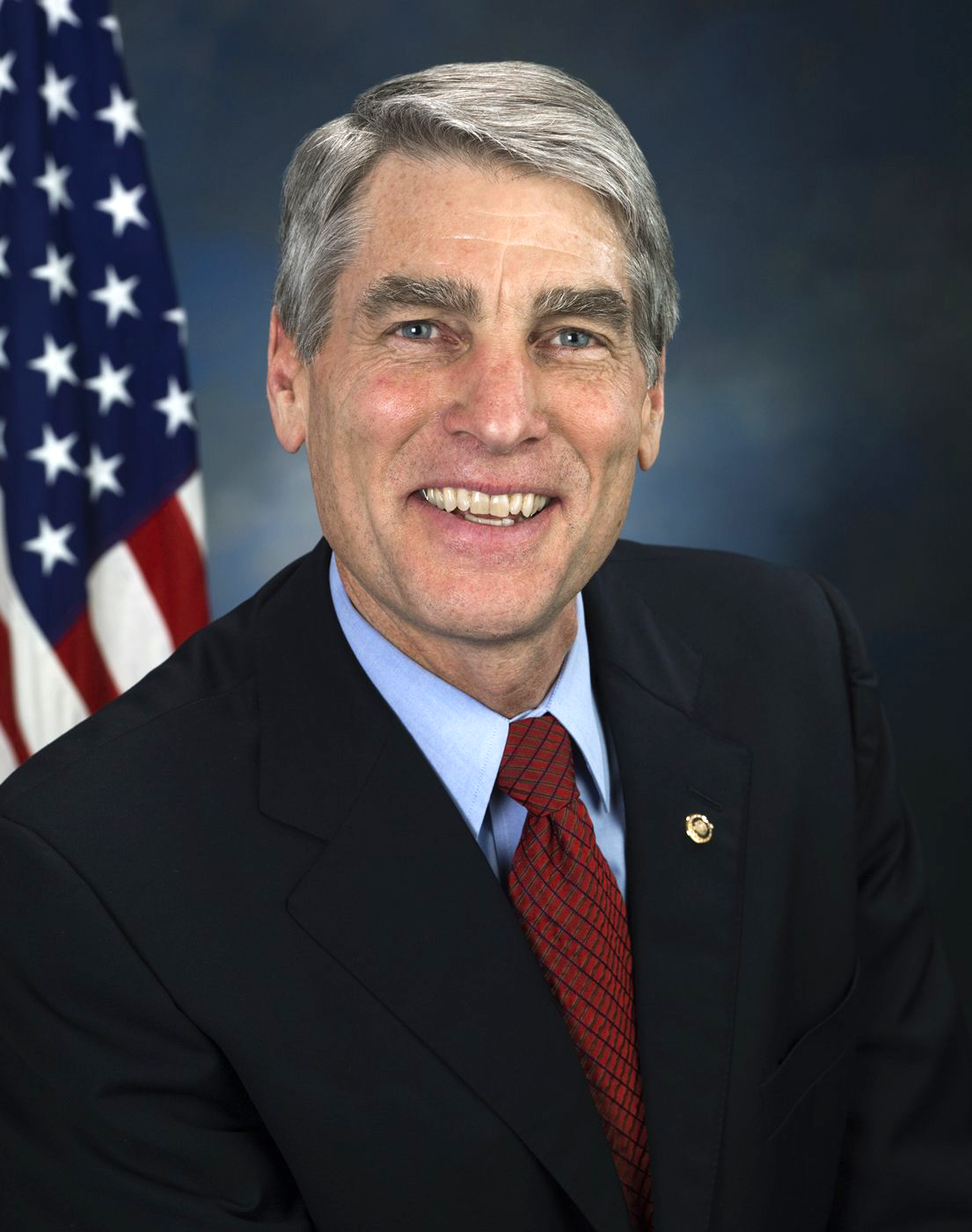

Nominee	Mark Udall	Carolyn Cox
Party	Democratic	Republican
Popular vote	155,725	109,338
Percentage	55.0%	38.6%
U.S. Representative before election
Mark Udall
Democratic
Elected U.S. Representative
Mark Udall
Democratic

2000 Colorado's 2nd congressional district election
Party	Candidate	Votes	%
Democratic	Mark Udall (incumbent)	155,725	55.00%
Republican	Carolyn Cox	109,338	38.62%
Green	Ronald N. Forthofer	12,398	4.38%
Libertarian	David Michael Baker	5,655	2.00%
Total votes		283,116	100.00%
Democratic hold			

=== District 3 ===
2000 Colorado's 3rd congressional district election
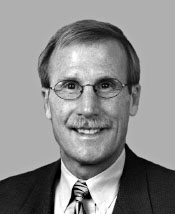

Nominee	Scott McInnis	Curtis Imrie
Party	Republican	Democratic
Popular vote	199,204	87,921
Percentage	65.8%	29.1%
- County results McInnis: 40–50% 50–60% 60–70% 70–80% 80–90% Imrie: 40–50%
U.S. Representative before election
Scott McInnis
Republican
Elected U.S. Representative
Scott McInnis
Republican

Incumbent Republican representative Scott McInnis was re-elected, soundly defeating Democrat Curtis Imrie.

2000 Colorado's 3rd congressional district election
Party	Candidate	Votes	%
Republican	Scott McInnis (incumbent)	199,204	65.84%
Democratic	Curtis Imrie	87,921	29.06%
Libertarian	Drew Sakson	9,982	3.30%
Reform	Victor A. Good	5,433	1.80%
Total votes		302,540	100.00%
Republican hold			

=== District 4 ===
2000 Colorado's 4th congressional district election
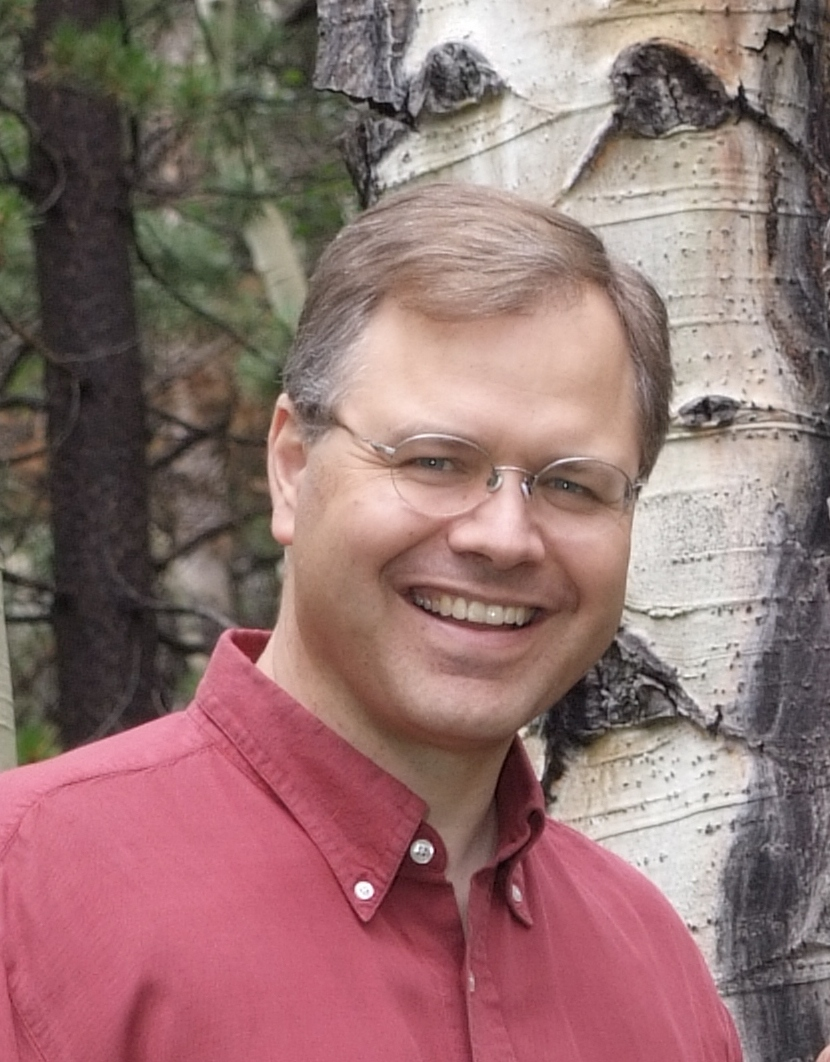

Nominee	Bob Schaffer	Dan Sewell Ward	Kordon Baker
Party	Republican	Natural Law	Libertarian
Popular vote	209,078	19,721	19,713
Percentage	79.5%	7.5%	7.5%
U.S. Representative before election
Bob Schaffer
Republican
Elected U.S. Representative
Bob Schaffer
Republican

2000 Colorado's 4th congressional district election
Party	Candidate	Votes	%
Republican	Bob Schaffer (incumbent)	209,078	79.50%
Natural Law	Dan Sewell Ward	19,721	7.50%
Libertarian	Kordon Baker	19,713	7.50%
Constitution	Leslie Hanks	9,955	3.78%
Independent	David Swartz (write-in)	4,539	1.72%
Total votes		263,006	100.00%
Republican hold			

=== District 5 ===
2000 Colorado's 5th congressional district election
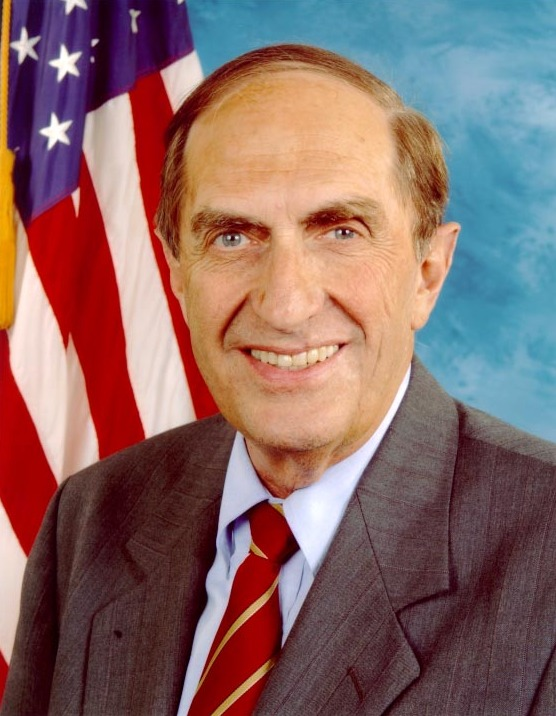

Nominee	Joel Hefley	Kerry Kantor
Party	Republican	Libertarian
Popular vote	253,330	37,719
Percentage	82.7%	12.3%
U.S. Representative before election
Joel Hefley
Republican
Elected U.S. Representative
Joel Hefley
Republican

2000 Colorado's 5th congressional district election
Party	Candidate	Votes	%
Republican	Joel Hefley (incumbent)	253,330	82.70%
Libertarian	Kerry Kantor	37,719	12.31%
Natural Law	Randy MacKenzie	15,260	4.98%
Total votes		306,309	100.00%
Republican hold			

=== District 6 ===
2000 Colorado's 6th congressional district election
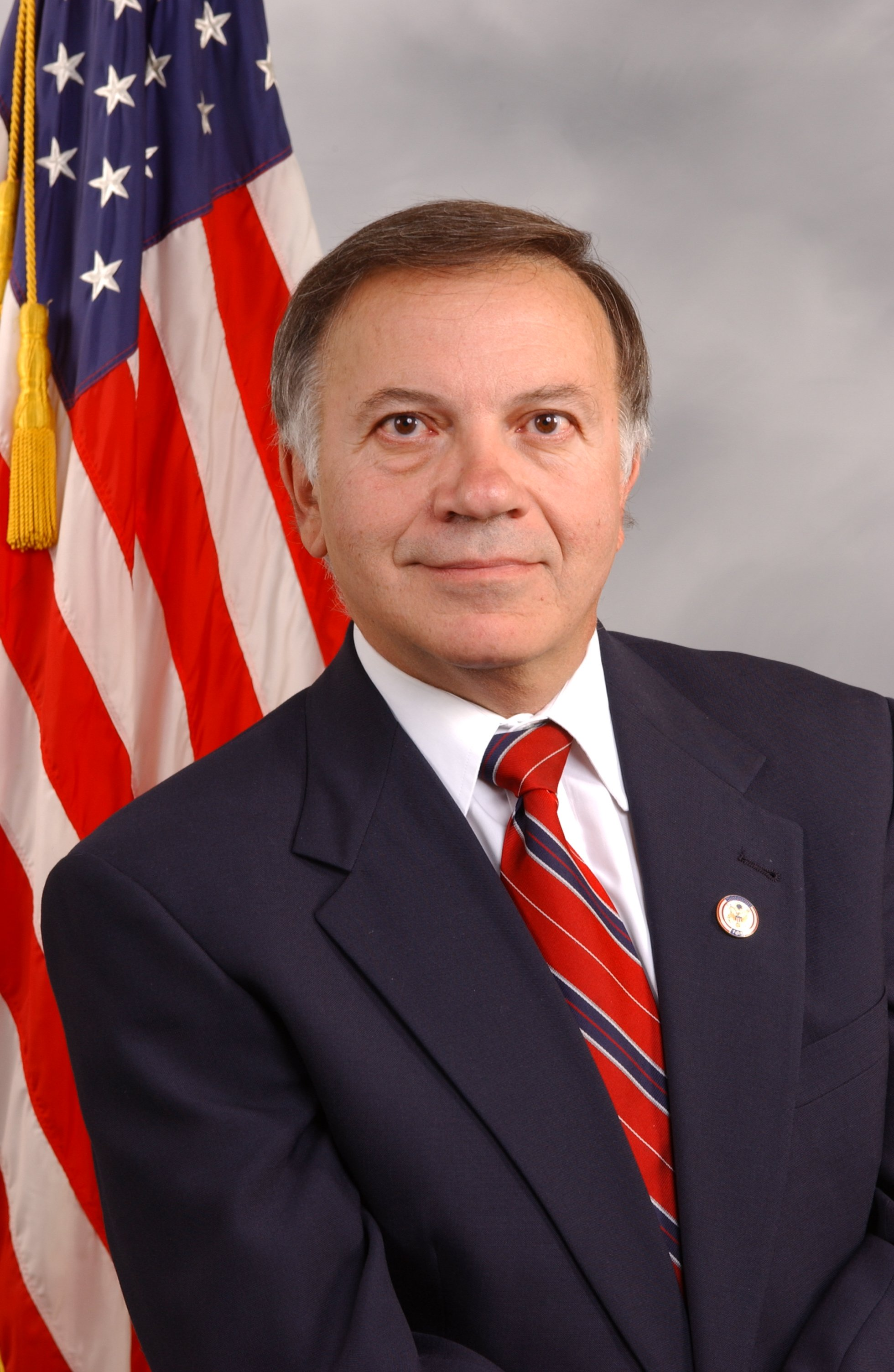

Nominee	Tom Tancredo	Kenneth Toltz
Party	Republican	Democratic
Popular vote	141,410	110,568
Percentage	53.9%	42.1%
U.S. Representative before election
Tom Tancredo
Republican
Elected U.S. Representative
Tom Tancredo
Republican

2000 Colorado's 6th congressional district election
Party	Candidate	Votes	%
Republican	Tom Tancredo (incumbent)	141,410	53.88%
Democratic	Kenneth Toltz	110,568	42.12%
Libertarian	Adam Katz	6,885	2.62%
Concerns of People	John Heckman	3,614	1.38%
Total votes		262,477	100.00%
Republican hold			
