= American Constitution Party (Colorado) =

Colorado affiliate of the Constitution Party

- Founded: July 23, 2000
- Headquarters: Fort Lupton, Colorado
- Membership (2020): 10,806
- Ideology: American nationalism National conservatism Social conservatism Christian right Christian reconstructionism Paleoconservatism
- Political position: Far-right
- National affiliation: Constitution Party
- State Senate: 0 / 35
- State House: 0 / 65

Website
- http://www.americanconstitutionparty.com

The American Constitution Party (ACP) is one of the state of Colorado's political parties. It is affiliated with the national-level Constitution Party, a conservative political party in the United States that says it bases most of its policy positions on the Constitution. The party asserts that the US is a Christian nation founded on the Bible and that American jurisprudence should be restored to what the party claims is its "Biblical foundations". The ACP qualified for major party status in Colorado after receiving more than 36% of the vote in the 2010 gubernatorial election. As the party did not field a candidate in the 2014 election, it reverted to minor party status.

== Background ==
The American Constitution Party registered as a political party with the state of Colorado on July 23, 2000. In July 2013, the ACP had just over 7,000 registered Colorado voters affiliated with it. Some of the party's positions include:

ACP members ... call for the abolition of the Food and Drug Administration, the Internal Revenue Service, the departments of Education and Energy and the Federal Election Commission. They seek the repeal of a number of laws, including one aimed at preventing threats and force against abortion clinics and women seeking abortions and a 1960s-era law meant to end discriminatory election practices.

For most of its existence, the ACP has existed as one of Colorado's "minor parties", and has never elected one of its candidates to office.

== Party platform ==
The American Constitution Party of Colorado seeks to:

- Allow state legislatures, not voters, to pick U.S. senators (i.e., repeal the 17th Amendment)
- Repeal legislation making it illegal to use force or the threat of force to interfere with a woman seeking an abortion
- Abolish congressional pensions
- End the Endangered Species Act
- Terminate the U.S. Departments of Energy and Education, the Food and Drug Administration, the Federal Election Commission and the Internal Revenue Service
- Ban electronic voting to prevent voter fraud
- Repeal all federal campaign-finance laws
- Repeal the Voting Rights Act of 1965
- End compulsory public school attendance and promote homeschooling, private schools or religious schools
- End any domestic federal aid not provided for in the U.S. Constitution, as it is "not only illegal, it is immoral"
- End foreign aid and participation in multinational groups, such as the United Nations, as well as multinational treaties
- Retake the Panama Canal for the United States
- Prevent women from serving in combat as "these 'advances' undermine the integrity, morale and performance of our military organizations"
- "Cease financing or arming of belligerents in the world's troubled areas"
- Return to the people all federal lands held by the government without constitutional authorization
- Revoke the legalization of the union of gay couples in either marriages or civil unions
- Immediately collect all foreign debts owed to the U.S.

The ACP is affiliated with the national-level Constitution Party, which has developed a party platform as well.

== 2010 Colorado gubernatorial election ==
Former Republican Congressman Tom Tancredo ran as the party's candidate for Colorado governor in 2010 after the campaign of Republican Party nominee Dan Maes collapsed politically. He won around 36% of the vote, receiving more than 2.5 times the vote of Republican Party nominee Maes. Democratic candidate John Hickenlooper won the election with just over 51% of the vote.

County results for the 2010 gubernatorial election Hickenlooper: 30–40% 40–50% 50–60% 60–70% 70–80% Tancredo: 30–40% 40–50% 50–60% 60–70% Maes: 30–40%

Colorado gubernatorial election (2010)
Party	Candidate	Votes	%	±%
Democratic	John Hickenlooper	912,005	51.01%	−5.97%
Constitution	Tom Tancredo	651,232	36.43%	+35.80%
Republican	Dan Maes	199,034	11.13%	−29.03%
Libertarian	Jaimes Brown	13,314	0.74%	−0.75%
Independent	Jason R. Clark	8,576	0.48%	
Independent	Paul Fiorino	3,483	0.19%	
Write-ins		86	0.00%	
Majority		260,773	14.59%	−2.24%
Turnout		1,787,730		
Democratic hold		Swing		

=== Context and aftermath ===
Under state law, the American Constitution Party's vote share in the 2010 gubernatorial election elevated the party from "minor" to "major" party status. Any party that earns 10% or more of the votes cast for governor is a defined under statute as a "major party". Major party status gives the party a place at or near the top of the ballot in the 2014 gubernatorial election.

However, because of the additional organizational, financial, and compliance requirements triggered by major party status, ACP leaders were ambivalent about the change.

After the election, Tancredo quickly rejoined the Republican Party, disappointing an ACP leadership struggling to contend with major party status and how to successfully leverage the increased attention the party had received because of his candidacy.

The party effectively relinquished its 'major party' status by the 2014 gubernatorial election, by virtue of not running or fielding a candidate.

== Best results in major races ==
Office	Percent (%)	District	Year	Candidate	Ref
Governor	36.38%	Statewide	2010	Tom Tancredo	
Governor	3.62%	Statewide	1994	Kevin Swanson	
Governor	0.86%	Statewide	2022	Danielle Neuschwanger	
US Senate	2.56%	Statewide	2008	Douglass Campbell	
US Senate	1.52%	Statewide	2002	Douglass Campbell	
US Senate	0.89%	Statewide	2004	Douglass Campbell	
US House	4.66%	CO 4	2010	Doug Aden	
US House	4.30%	CO 5	2012	Kenneth R. Harvell	
US House	3.78%	CO 4	2000	Leslie Hanks	
State senate	15.19%	SD 12	2012	James Michael Bristol	
State senate	9.51%	SD 10	2012	Christopher Mull	
State senate	5.08%	SD 31	2010	Clifton Powell	
State house	15.91%	HD 21	2012	Sean Halstead	
State house	13.86%	HD 16	2012	David Rawe	
State house	11.50%	HD 15	2012	Michael Edstrom	

== Recent electoral history ==
Although the American Constitution Party's political and organizational sophistication did not grow despite the attention brought to it by Tancredo's 2010 gubernatorial candidacy, the party fielded more candidates in the 2010 and 2012 cycles than it had in the entirety of the previous decade.

In the 2022 elections, the party fielded candidates in races for US House, in Districts 2, 4 and 5, as well as in statewide elections for Governor, Lieutenant Governor, Secretary of State, and in District 8 for the Board of Education. All were unsuccessful, recording less than 1% of the vote in most of these races.

In the 2026 elections, the party fielded Sean Pond, a previous Republican candidate, as a candidate for Colorado's U.S. Senate seat.

Candidates fielded 2002–2014
Election Year	Office	Name
2014	Adams County Sheriff	James Fariello
2014	Mesa County Assessor	Steve Henderson
2013	Steamboat Springs School Board	Joseph Andrew
2012	Adams County Commissioner	James Fariello
2012	Colorado House, District 14	Ryan Dyer
2012	Colorado House, District 14	Thomas O'dell
2012	Colorado House, District 15	Michael Edstrom
2012	Colorado House, District 16	David Rawe
2012	Colorado House, District 17	Barry Pace
2012	Colorado House, District 18	Amy Fedde
2012	Colorado House, District 19	Timothy Biolchini
2012	Colorado House, District 20	Donna Burdick
2012	Colorado House, District 21	Sean Halstead
2012	Colorado House, District 61	Robert Petrowsky
2012	Colorado Senate, District 10	Christopher Mull
2012	Colorado Senate, District 12	James Bristol
2012	CU Regent, At-Large	Tyler Belmont
2012	CU Regent, At-Large	Brian Scott
2012	CU Regent, District 5	Gina Biolchini
2012	El Paso County Commissioner	Kathy Payne
2010	Adams County Sheriff	James Fariello
2010	Colorado Senate, District 31	Clifton Powell
2010	Governor	Benjamin Goss
2010	Governor	Tom Tancredo
2010	Lt. Governor	Patricia Miller
2010	Motezuma County Sheriff	Gerald Wallace
2010	Secretary of State	Amanda Campbell
2008	Colorado House, District 27	Amanda Campbell
2008	Colorado House, District 37	Brian Olds
2008	Park County Commissioner	Zdenko Novkovic
2006	Colorado House, District 53	Darren Morrison
2006	Colorado Senate, District 16	Tim Leonard
2006	CU Regent, At-Large	Douglas "Dayhorse" Campbell
2006	Governor	Clyde Harkins
2006	La Plata County Commissioner	Padraig Lynch
2006	Lt. Governor	Tracy Davison
2002	Attorney General	Gaar Potter
2002	Colorado House	Paul Berthelot
2002	Colorado House, District 57	Dr. Zane Newitt
2002	Lt. Governor	Desiree Hickson

== See also ==
- Politics of Colorado
- Electoral history of the Constitution Party
- List of state Constitution Parties
