= Pack burro racing =

Burro races that commemorate miners

Board giving names of past winners

Pack burro racing is a sport in Colorado, Arizona, California, and New Mexico that is rooted in the various western states' mining histories. In the early days of the mining industry in Colorado, miners would take donkeys (burros in Spanish) through the mountains of Colorado while prospecting. Because the burros were carrying supplies, the miners could not ride the animals and so they would walk, leading the donkey. Burro races are held throughout small towns in Colorado, Arizona, California, and New Mexico to commemorate the miners and their burros. In 2012, pack burro racing was recognized as the official "summer heritage sport" in Colorado.

== History ==
Legend holds that the races trace back to an incident in which two miners, finding gold at the same location simultaneously, raced each other to the claims office. Because the burros were too small or loaded to carry their owners, the miners were forced to run, leading the burros.

The earliest official race took place in 1949, organized by the towns of Leadville and Fairplay. In 2012, burro racing was designated as an official "summer heritage sport" by the Colorado government.

== Format ==
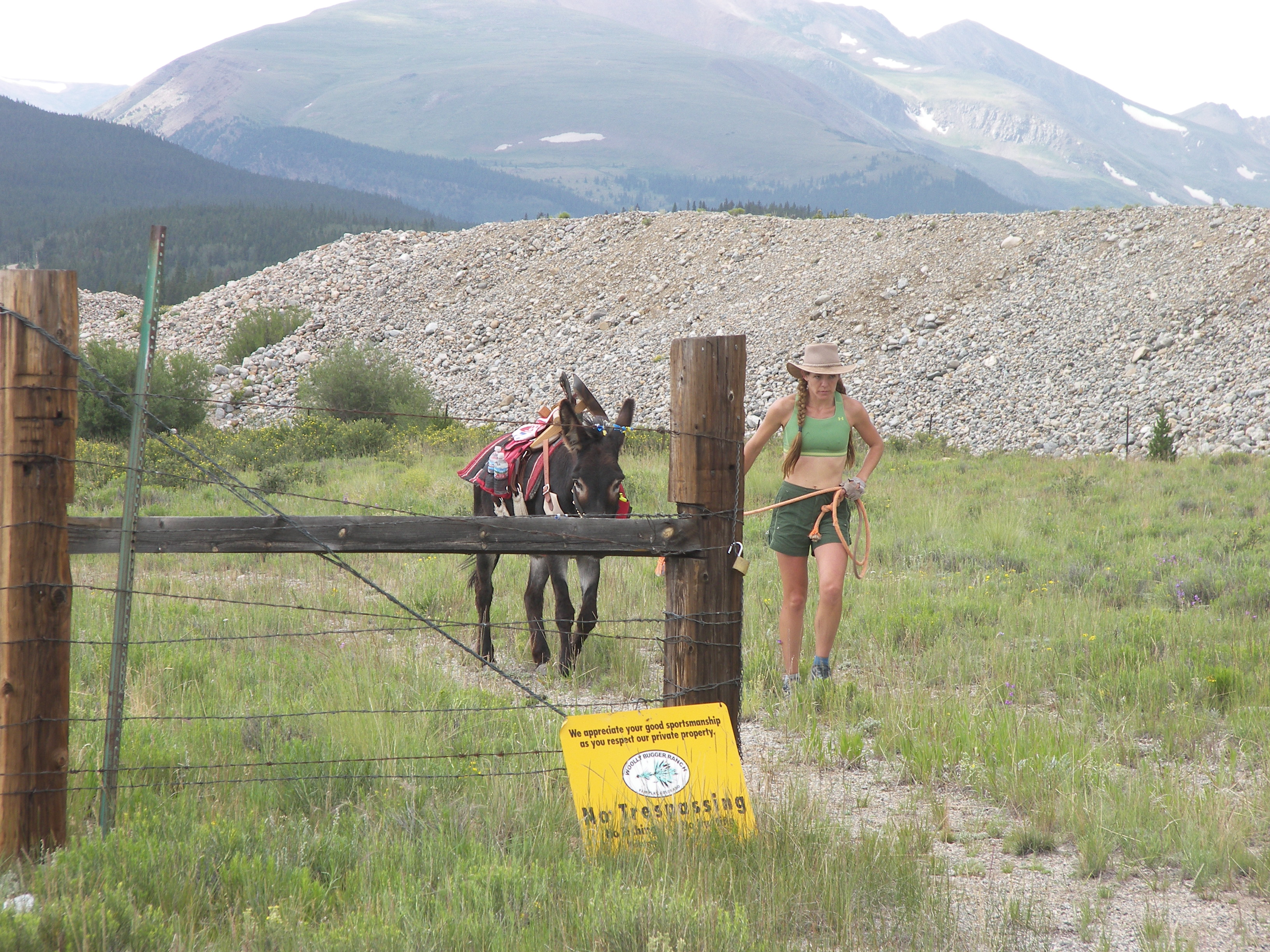
A burro racer and her burro on the trail

In a typical burro race, a runner and a burro travel a prescribed course together, with the runner leading the burro on a rope. Riding the burro is not allowed, though the human may carry the burro. The burro must be on a lead rope, which is limited to 15 feet (4.6 m). Runners must maintain control of their animals at all times. Burros were formerly required to carry a pack saddle with 33 pounds (15 kilograms) of traditional mining gear, which must include a pick, gold pan, and shovel. The weight requirement has since been lifted, however, the mining paraphernalia of a pick, gold pan, and shovel are still required to be carried on the pack saddle or in panniers. Runners may also include other gear in their pack saddles, such as windbreakers, water, food, etc. Cruelty to the burro is prohibited and racing officials may have burros examined by a veterinarian after the race.

== Competition ==
Like horse racing, burro racing has its own "Triple Crown," consisting of three races.

=== Fairplay ===
The Fairplay race is 29 miles (47 km) and counts as an ultra-marathon. It takes place in late July as part of Fairplay's Burro Days town festival. The race begins on the main street and goes to the top of Mosquito Pass.

=== Leadville ===
The Leadville race is 22 miles. It takes place the first full weekend of August, typically a week after the Fairplay race, as part of the Leadville's Boom Days city festival. The race goes to the top of Mosquito Pass, then comes back into town through the California Gulch Mining District, past the site of Oro City.

=== Buena Vista ===
The Buena Vista race is 12 miles. It typically takes place a week after the Leadville race as part of Buena Vista's Gold Rush Days festival.

== Other races ==
In addition to the Colorado Triple Crown Races, other mining towns throughout Colorado are adding burro races to their event schedule, usually as part of an existing town festival. Towns include:

- Georgetown, Colorado
- Cripple Creek, Colorado
- Idaho Springs, Colorado
- Creede, Colorado
- Victor, Colorado
- Frederick, Colorado

Outside Colorado, versions of this sport have historically been enjoyed in other states going back to the 1950s in Big Bear, CA with the Old Miners Days Burro Race; and in the 1960s in Beatty, NV which hosted their annual Burro Race using a ready supply of wild burros from the historic Bullfrog Mining District. In Arizona the Lion's Club in Apache Junction conducted their own burro races starting in 1958. These races lasted a few years before going on a hiatus and coming back in 2021.

Nowadays, the excitement generated by Colorado's enthusiastic embrace of the sport is now beginning to fuel an interest in other western states. In 2019, Superior, AZ celebrated its own mining and burro history with the Arizona inaugural Superior Burro Run (now titled the BRAY Superior Jackass Dash). Since returning burro racing to Arizona the sport has taken off within the state. The towns and ranches of the Arizona races include:

- Superior, Arizona
- Apache Junction, Arizona
- Sonoita, Arizona
- Black Canyon City, Arizona
- Tombstone, Arizona
- Sandam Ranch, Arizona

In 2020, organizers in both California and New Mexico hosted their own versions of the event with inaugural races in both states that have since flourished and continued annually. The towns that host these races are:

- Inyokern, California
- Burney, California
- Cerrillos, New Mexico

== Notable competitors ==
- Curtis Imrie, three time world champion
