= 2010 United States House of Representatives elections in Colorado =

- November 2, 2010

All 7 Colorado seats to the United States House of Representatives
- Registered: 2,477,958
- Turnout: 73.49%
	Majority party	Minority party
Party	Republican	Democratic
Last election	2 seats, 43.38%	5 seats, 55.16%
Seats before	2	5
Seats won	4	3
Seat change	▲2	▼2
Popular vote	884,032	800,900
Percentage	50.14%	45.42%
Swing	▲6.75%	▼9.73%

Republican
40–50%
50–60%
60–70%
70–80%
80–90%
Democratic
40–50%
50–60%
60–70%
70–80%

The 2010 congressional elections in Colorado were held on November 2, 2010, to determine who will represent the state of Colorado in the United States House of Representatives. Representatives are elected for two-year terms; those elected will serve in the 112th Congress.

Colorado has seven seats in the House, apportioned according to the 2000 United States census. Its 2008-2009 congressional delegation consisted of five Democrats and two Republicans.

== Overview ==
=== Statewide ===
Party	Candidates	Votes		Seats		
Party	Candidates	No.	%	No.	+/–	%
Republican	7	884,032	50.14	4	▲2	57.14
Democratic	7	800,900	45.42	3	▼2	42.86
Libertarian	6	38,864	2.20	0	Steady	0.0
Constitution	4	27,419	1.56	0	Steady	0.0
Others	2	8,968	0.51	0	Steady	0.0
Green	1	2,923	0.17	0	Steady	0.0
Write-in	3	46	0.00	0	Steady	0.0
Total	30	1,763,152	100.0	7	Steady	100.0

Popular vote
Republican	50.14%
Democratic	45.42%
Libertarian	2.20%
Other	2.24%

House seats
Republican	57.14%
Democratic	42.86%

=== By district ===
Results of the 2010 United States House of Representatives elections in Colorado by district:

District	Republican		Democratic		Others		Total		Result
District	Votes	%	Votes	%	Votes	%	Votes	%	Result
District 1	59,747	28.97%	140,073	65.81%	7,931	5.22%	207,751	100.0%	Democratic hold
District 2	98,171	37.90%	148,720	57.41%	12,143	4.69%	259,034	100.0%	Democratic hold
District 3	129,257	50.10%	118,048	45.76%	10,694	4.14%	257,999	100.0%	Republican gain
District 4	138,634	52.48%	109,249	41.35%	16,298	6.17%	264,181	100.0%	Republican gain
District 5	152,829	65.75%	68,039	29.27%	11,566	4.98%	232,434	100.0%	Republican hold
District 6	217,368	65.68%	104,104	31.46%	9,471	2.86%	330,943	100.0%	Republican hold
District 7	88,026	41.76%	112,667	53.44%	10,117	4.80%	210,810	100.0%	Democratic hold
Total	884,032	50.14%	800,900	45.42%	78,220	4.44%	1,763,152	100.0%	

== District 1 ==
2010 Colorado's 1st congressional district election
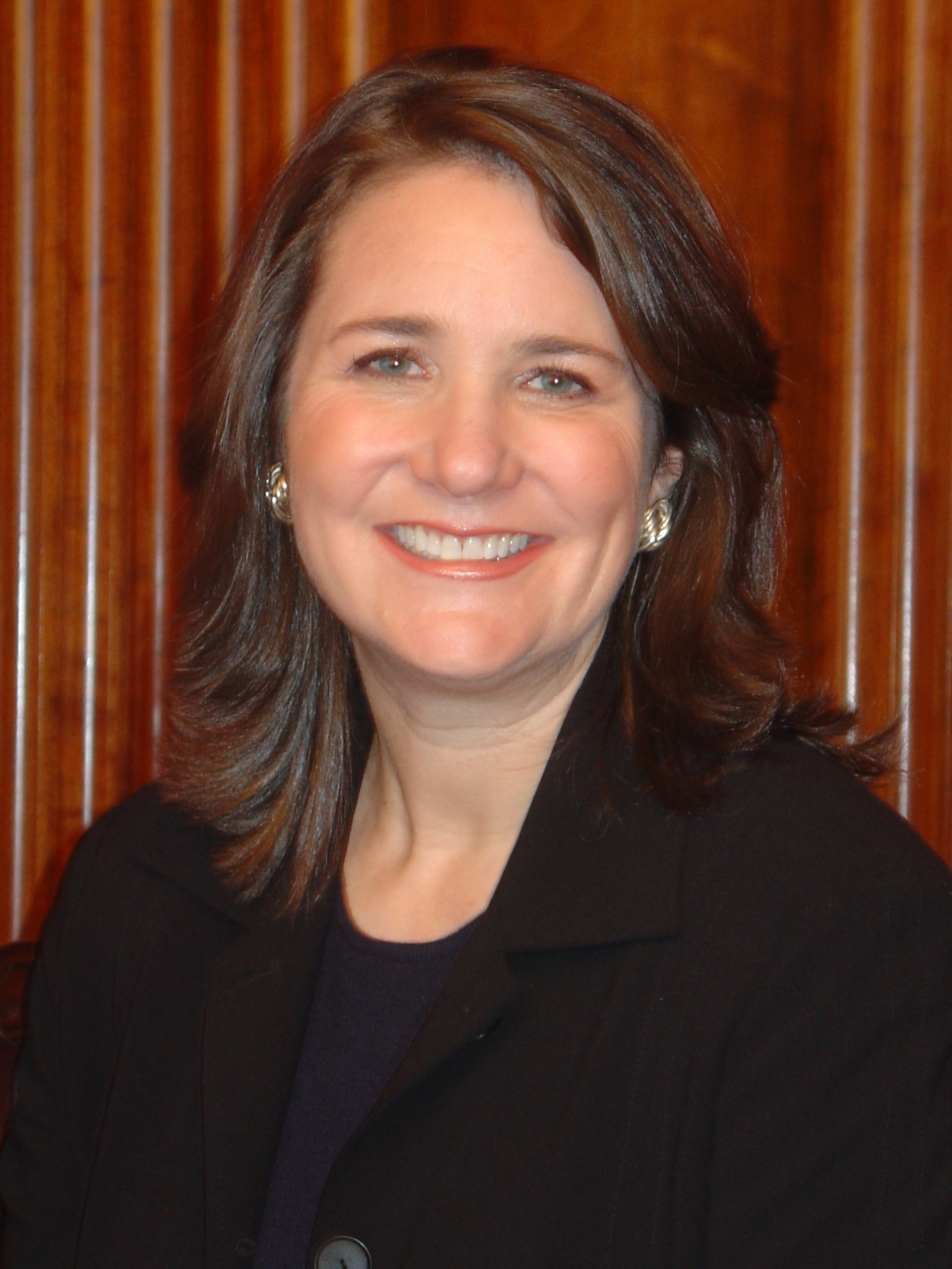

Nominee	Diana DeGette	Mike Fallon
Party	Democratic	Republican
Popular vote	140,073	59,747
Percentage	67.4%	28.8%
- County results DeGette: 50–60% 60–70% Fallon: 60–70%
U.S. Representative before election
Diana DeGette
Democratic
Elected U.S. Representative
Diana DeGette
Democratic

Incumbent Democrat Diana DeGette, who had represented this liberal Denver based district since 1997, ran for re-election. She was re-elected with 71.9% of the vote in 2008 and the district had a PVI of D+21.

=== Democratic primary ===
==== Candidates ====
===== Nominee =====
- Diana DeGette, incumbent U.S. Representative

==== Results ====
Democratic primary results
Party	Candidate	Votes	%
Democratic	Diana DeGette (incumbent)	57,527	100.0
Total votes		57,527	100.0

=== Republican primary ===
==== Candidates ====
===== Nominee =====
- Mike Fallon, emergency room physician

===== Withdrawn =====
- Steven Barton

==== Results ====
Republican primary results
Party	Candidate	Votes	%
Republican	Mike Fallon	13,970	100.0
Total votes		13,970	100.0

=== Libertarian primary ===
==== Candidates ====
===== Nominee =====
- Clint Jones, human resources manager

===== Eliminated in primary =====
- Jeffrey Schitter, business owner

==== Results ====
Libertarian primary results
Party	Candidate	Votes	%
Libertarian	Clint Jones	216	59.5
Libertarian	Jeffrey Schitter	147	40.5
Total votes		363	100.0

=== Green primary ===
==== Candidates ====
===== Nominee =====
- Gary Swing, perennial candidate

=== Constitution primary ===
==== Candidates ====
===== Nominee =====
- Chris Styskal, former corporate manager

=== General election ===
==== Campaign ====
Fallon's campaign was characterized by informal "town hall meetings," often held at local pubs, and by "door-to-door" interaction with voters. On September 20,, Fallon made national news when the NRCC upgraded him to "On the Radar" status - the first of three levels in their Young Guns Program. This prompted DeGette to send an email to supporters, informing them of Fallon's "On the Radar" status, and requesting donations, stating that, "We can't take anything for granted this year." The fundraising request received significant local media attention.

The Denver Post strongly endorsed DeGette for re-election, praising her for having "served [her] district well" and for being "a steady voice who has served the interests of her district and the nation."

==== Endorsements ====
Diana DeGette (D)

Newspapers

- The Denver Post
Mike Fallon (R)

Organizations

- Eagle Forum
- National Republican Congressional Committee "On the Radar" Program
- Tea Party Express

==== Polling ====
Poll source	Date(s) administered	Sample size (Note: Key: A – all adults RV – registered voters LV – likely voters V – unclear)	Margin of error	Diana DeGette (D)	Mike Fallon (R)	Undecided
ccAdvertising (R)	October 17–19, 2010	698 (LV)	±?%	44%	36%	20%

==== Predictions ====
Source	Ranking	As of
The Cook Political Report	Safe D	November 1, 2010
Rothenberg	Safe D	November 1, 2010
Sabato's Crystal Ball	Safe D	November 1, 2010
RCP	Safe D	November 1, 2010
CQ Politics	Safe D	October 28, 2010
New York Times	Safe D	November 1, 2010
FiveThirtyEight	Safe D	November 1, 2010

==== Results ====
Congresswoman DeGette was heavily favored to win re-election, and on election day, she overwhelmingly won an eighth term in Congress.

Colorado's 1st congressional district election, 2010
Party	Candidate	Votes	%
Democratic	Diana DeGette (incumbent)	140,073	67.4
Republican	Mike Fallon	59,747	28.8
Green	Gary Swing	2,923	1.4
Libertarian	Clint Jones	2,867	1.4
American Constitution	Chris Styskal	2,141	1.0
Majority		80,326	38.7
Turnout		214,472	71.1
Registered electors		301,491	
Democratic hold			

==== Finances ====
===== Campaigns =====
Candidate (party)	Raised	Spent	Cash on hand
Diana DeGette (D)	$825,016	$822,289	$108,829
Mike Fallon (R)	$196,993	$196,993	$0
Clint Jones (L)	Unreported		
Gary Swing (G)	Unreported		
Chris Styskal (C)	Unreported		

===== Outside Spending =====
Candidate (party)	Supported	Opposed
Diana DeGette (D)	$20,509	$0
Mike Fallon (R)	$0	$0
Clint Jones (L)	$0	$0
Gary Swing (G)	$0	$0
Chris Styskal (C)	$0	$0

== District 2 ==
2010 Colorado's 2nd congressional district election
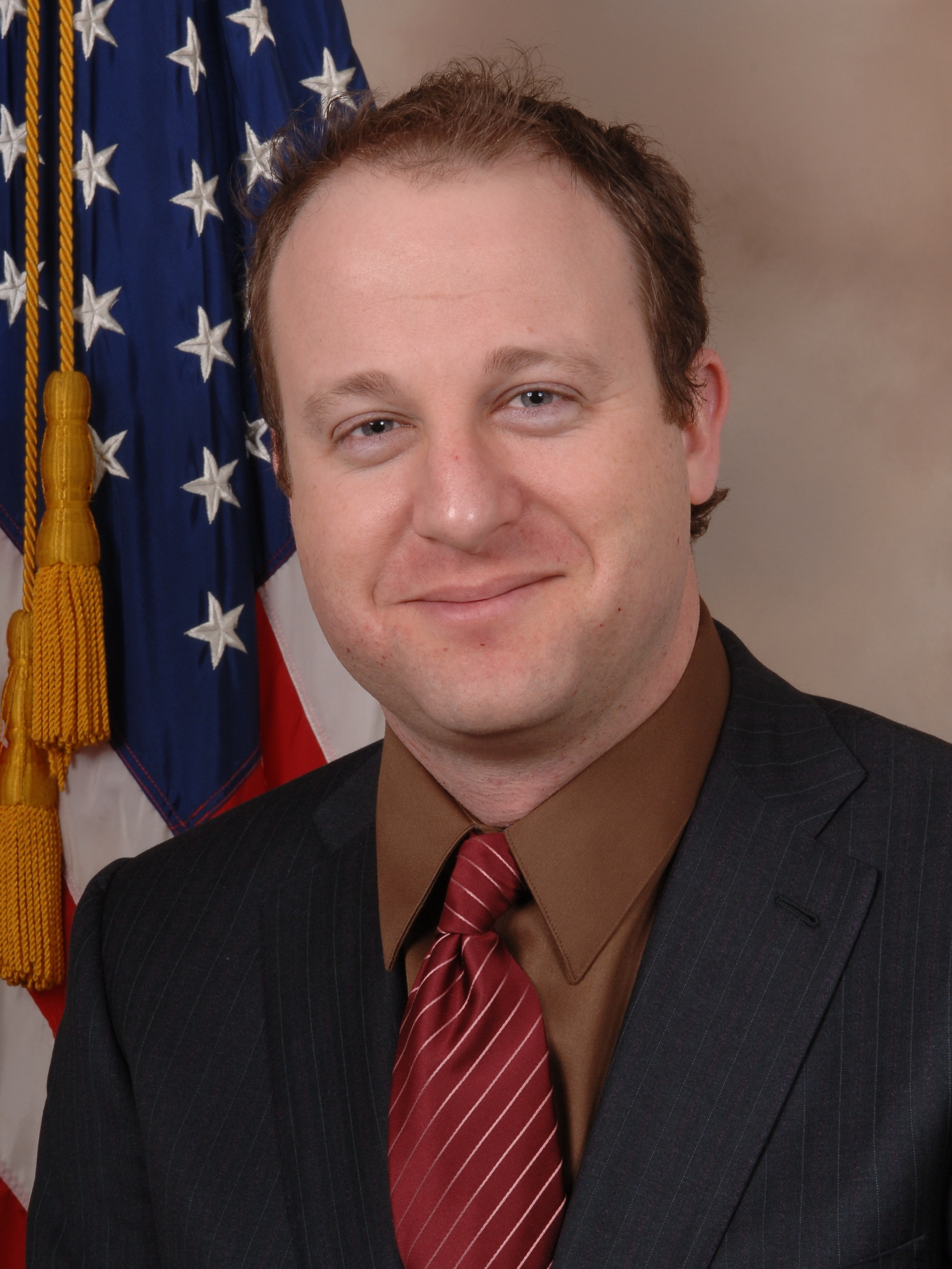

Nominee	Jared Polis	Stephen Bailey
Party	Democratic	Republican
Popular vote	148,720	116,619
Percentage	57.4%	37.9%
- County results Polis: 50–60% 70–80% Bailey: 40–50% 50–60%
U.S. Representative before election
Jared Polis
Democratic
Elected U.S. Representative
Jared Polis
Democratic

Incumbent Democrat Jared Polis, who had represented the district, centred around heavily Democratic Boulder and the northwestern suburbs of Denver, since 2009, ran for re-election. He was elected with 62.6% of the vote in 2008 and the district had a PVI of D+11.

=== Democratic primary ===
==== Candidates ====
===== Nominee =====
- Jared Polis, incumbent U.S. Representative

==== Results ====
Democratic primary results
Party	Candidate	Votes	%
Democratic	Jared Polis (incumbent)	47,347	100.0
Total votes		47,347	100.0

=== Republican primary ===
==== Candidates ====
===== Nominee =====
- Stephen Bailey, software marketing director

===== Eliminated in primary =====
- Bob Brancato, private investigator

==== Campaign ====
Brancato briefly suspended his campaign in July following a local newspaper reporting on 2009 domestic incident that the police attended. Brancato's wife vehemently denied there had been domestic abuse and stated that she called police because her husband was suffering from an episode of post-traumatic stress disorder.

==== Results ====
Republican primary results
Party	Candidate	Votes	%
Republican	Stephen Bailey	23,439	69.4
Republican	Bob Brancato	10,353	30.6
Total votes		33,792	100.0

=== Libertarian primary ===
==== Candidates ====
===== Nominee =====
- Curtis Harris, retired businessman and investor

=== Constitution primary ===
==== Candidates ====
===== Nominee =====
- Jenna Goss, event promotions contractor

=== Unity primary ===
==== Candidates ====
===== Withdrawn =====
- Bill Hammons, founder and National Chairman of the Unity Party of America

=== General election ===
==== Endorsements ====
Jared Polis (D)

Newspapers

- Boulder Weekly
- The Denver Post
Stephen Bailey (R)

Organizations

- Tea Party Express

==== Polling ====
Poll source	Date(s) administered	Sample size	Margin of error	Jared Polis (D)	Stephen Bailey (R)	Other	Undecided
Magellan Data and Mapping Strategies (R)	September 20, 2010	688 (LV)	±3.7%	48%	36%	8%	8%

==== Predictions ====
Source	Ranking	As of
The Cook Political Report	Safe D	November 1, 2010
Rothenberg	Safe D	November 1, 2010
Sabato's Crystal Ball	Safe D	November 1, 2010
RCP	Safe D	November 1, 2010
CQ Politics	Safe D	October 28, 2010
New York Times	Safe D	November 1, 2010
FiveThirtyEight	Safe D	November 1, 2010

==== Results ====
As expected, Polis won by a wide margin, albeit a smaller one than this district is used to giving its Democratic representatives.

Colorado's 2nd congressional district election, 2010
Party	Candidate	Votes	%
Democratic	Jared Polis (incumbent)	148,720	57.4
Republican	Stephen Bailey	98,171	37.9
American Constitution	Jenna Goss	7,080	2.7
Libertarian	Curtis Harris	5,056	2.0
Write-in		7	0.0
Majority		50,549	19.5
Turnout		267,021	72.5
Registered electors		368,143	
Democratic hold			

==== Finances ====
===== Campaigns =====
Candidate (party)	Raised	Spent	Cash on hand
Jared Polis (D)	$1,248,539	$895,953	$382,126
Stephen Bailey (R)	$130,886	$130,747	$139
Curtis Harris (L)	$8,474	$8,476	$0
Jenna Goss (C)	Unreported		

===== Outside Spending =====
Candidate (party)	Supported	Opposed
Jared Polis (D)	$96,882	$0
Stephen Bailey (R)	$0	$0
Curtis Harris (L)	$0	$0
Jenna Goss (C)	$0	$0

== District 3 ==
2010 Colorado's 3rd congressional district election
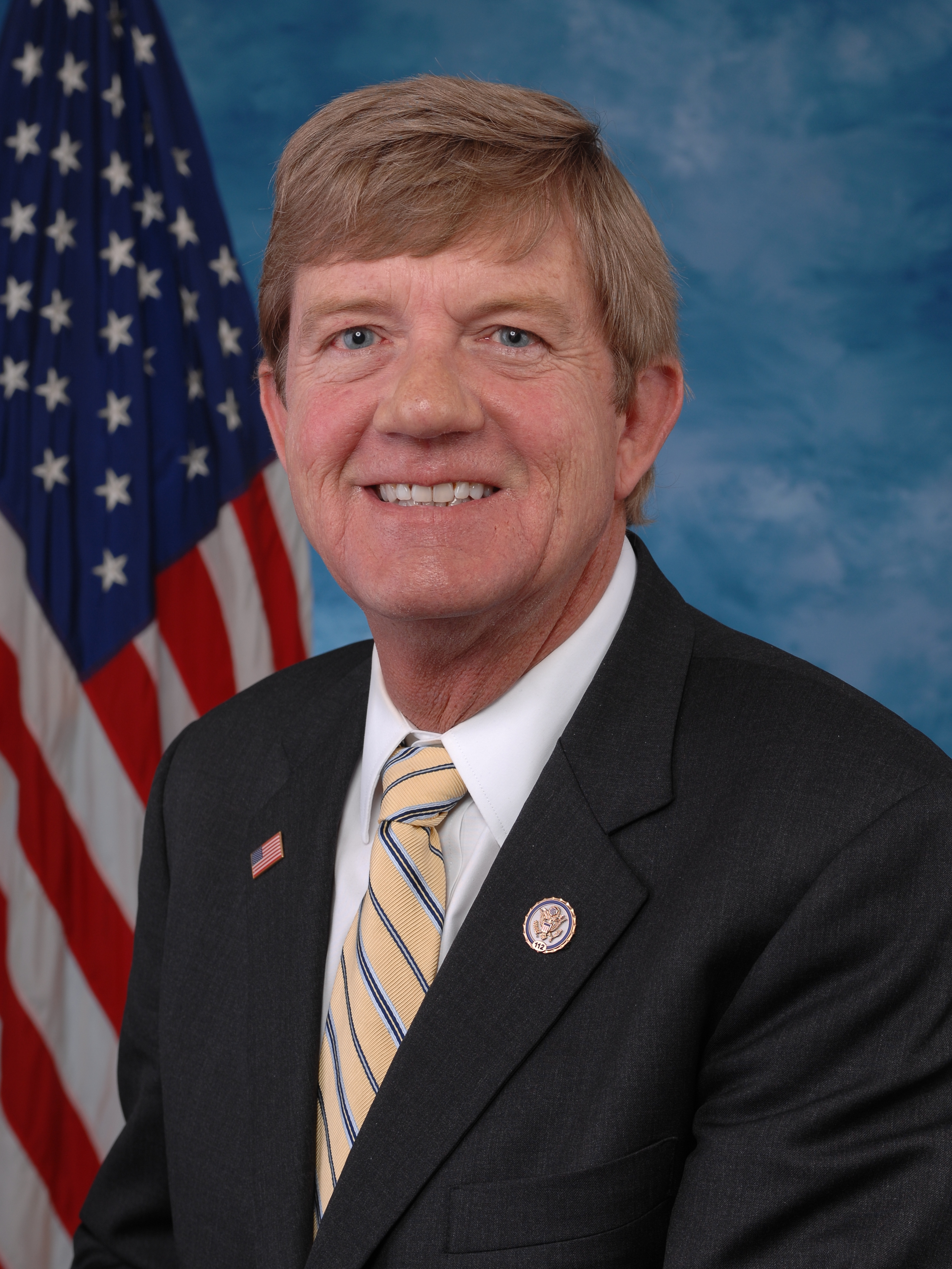

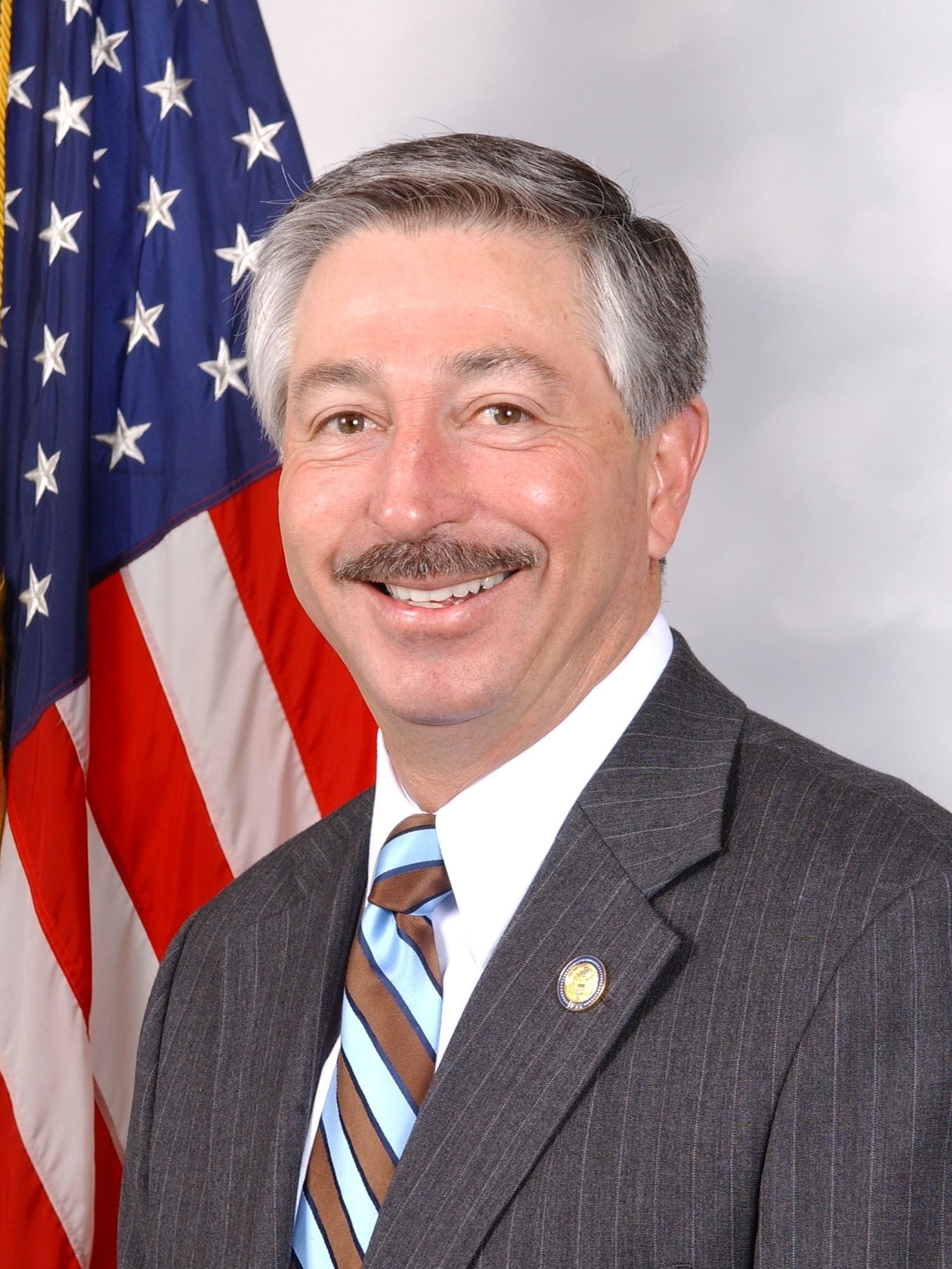
Nominee	Scott Tipton	John Salazar
Party	Republican	Democratic
Popular vote	129,257	118,048
Percentage	50.1%	45.8%
- County results Tipton: 40–50% 50–60% 60–70% 70–80% Salazar: 40–50% 50–60% 60–70% 70–80%
U.S. Representative before election
John Salazar
Democratic
Elected U.S. Representative
Scott Tipton
Republican

Incumbent Democrat John Salazar, who had represented the conservative, west Colorado district since 2005, ran for re-election. He was re–elected with % of the vote in 2008 and the district had a PVI of R+5.

=== Democratic primary ===
==== Candidates ====
===== Nominee =====
- John Salazar, incumbent U.S. Representative

==== Results ====
Democratic primary results
Party	Candidate	Votes	%
Democratic	John Salazar (incumbent)	46,148	100.0
Total votes		46,148	100.0

=== Republican primary ===
==== Candidates ====
===== Nominee =====
- Scott Tipton, state representative and nominee for this seat in 2006

===== Eliminated in primary =====
- Bob McConnell, retired lawyer and Army officer

===== Withdrawn =====
- Martin Beeson, district attorney for the 9th Judicial District (endorsed Tipton)

==== Endorsements ====
Bob McConnell

Statewide officials

- Sarah Palin, former Governor of Alaska and nominee for Vice President of the United States in 2008

==== Results ====
Republican primary results
Party	Candidate	Votes	%
Republican	Scott Tipton	39,346	55.8
Republican	Bob McConnell	31,214	44.2
Total votes		70,560	100.0

=== Libertarian primary ===
==== Candidates ====
===== Nominee =====
- Gregory Gilman, electrical engineer

=== Other Candidates ===
- Jake Segrest, small business owner (Independent)

=== General election ===
==== Campaign ====
A contentious race ensued. Tipton attacked Salazar for voting for the 2009 Stimulus while Salazar retaliated that Tipton wanted to "[cut] Social Security and Medicare spending in half."

While the Denver Post praised Scott Tipton as a state lawmaker who "is knowledgeable about the issues, and touts his private sector experience," the Post endorsed Salazar for re-election, citing his "ability to work with people from differing political views to seek solutions that work for the district."

==== Endorsements ====
John Salazar (D)

Organizations

- Blue Dog Coalition

Newspapers

- The Denver Post
Scott Tipton (R)

Organizations

- Eagle Forum
- National Republican Congressional Committee "Young Guns" Program
- Tea Party Express

==== Polling ====
Poll source	Date(s) administered	Sample size	Margin of error	John Salazar (D)	Scott Tipton (R)	Other	Undecided
Penn Schoen Berland (The Hill/ANGA)	October 19–21, 2010	400 (LV)	±4.9	43%	47%	2%	8%
Ayres, McHenry & Associates (R–American Action Forum)	August 23–28, 2010	400 (LV)	±4.9	43%	51%	–	7%
Magellan Data and Mapping Strategies (R)	August 17–19, 2010	?	±3.1	43%	49%	–	8%
Tarrance Group (R)	December 8–9, 2009	?	±5.7	46%	44%	–	10%

==== Predictions ====
Source	Ranking	As of
The Cook Political Report	Tossup	November 1, 2010
Rothenberg	Tilt R (flip)	November 1, 2010
Sabato's Crystal Ball	Lean R (flip)	November 1, 2010
RCP	Lean R (flip)	November 1, 2010
CQ Politics	Tossup	October 28, 2010
New York Times	Tossup	November 1, 2010
FiveThirtyEight	Lean R (flip)	November 1, 2010

==== Results ====
Colorado's 3rd congressional district election, 2010
Party	Candidate	Votes	%
Republican	Scott Tipton	129,257	50.1
Democratic	John Salazar (incumbent)	118,048	45.8
Libertarian	Gregory Gilman	5,678	2.2
Independent	Jake Segrest	4,982	1.9
Write-in		34	0.0
Majority		11,209	4.3
Turnout		267,822	72.5
Registered electors		355,428	
Republican gain from Democratic			

==== Finances ====
===== Campaigns =====
Candidate (party)	Raised	Spent	Cash on hand
John Salazar (D)	$2,067,198	$2,474,562	$57,389
Scott Tipton (R)	$1,232,113	$1,207,832	$24,117
Gregory Gilman (L)	Unreported		
Jake Segrest (I)	$18,767	$18,465	$300

===== Outside Spending =====
Candidate (party)	Supported	Opposed
John Salazar (D)	$213,381	$1,452,647
Scott Tipton (R)	$106,637	$2,067,485
Gregory Gilman (L)	$0	$0
Jake Segrest (I)	$0	$0

== District 4 ==
2010 Colorado's 4th congressional district election
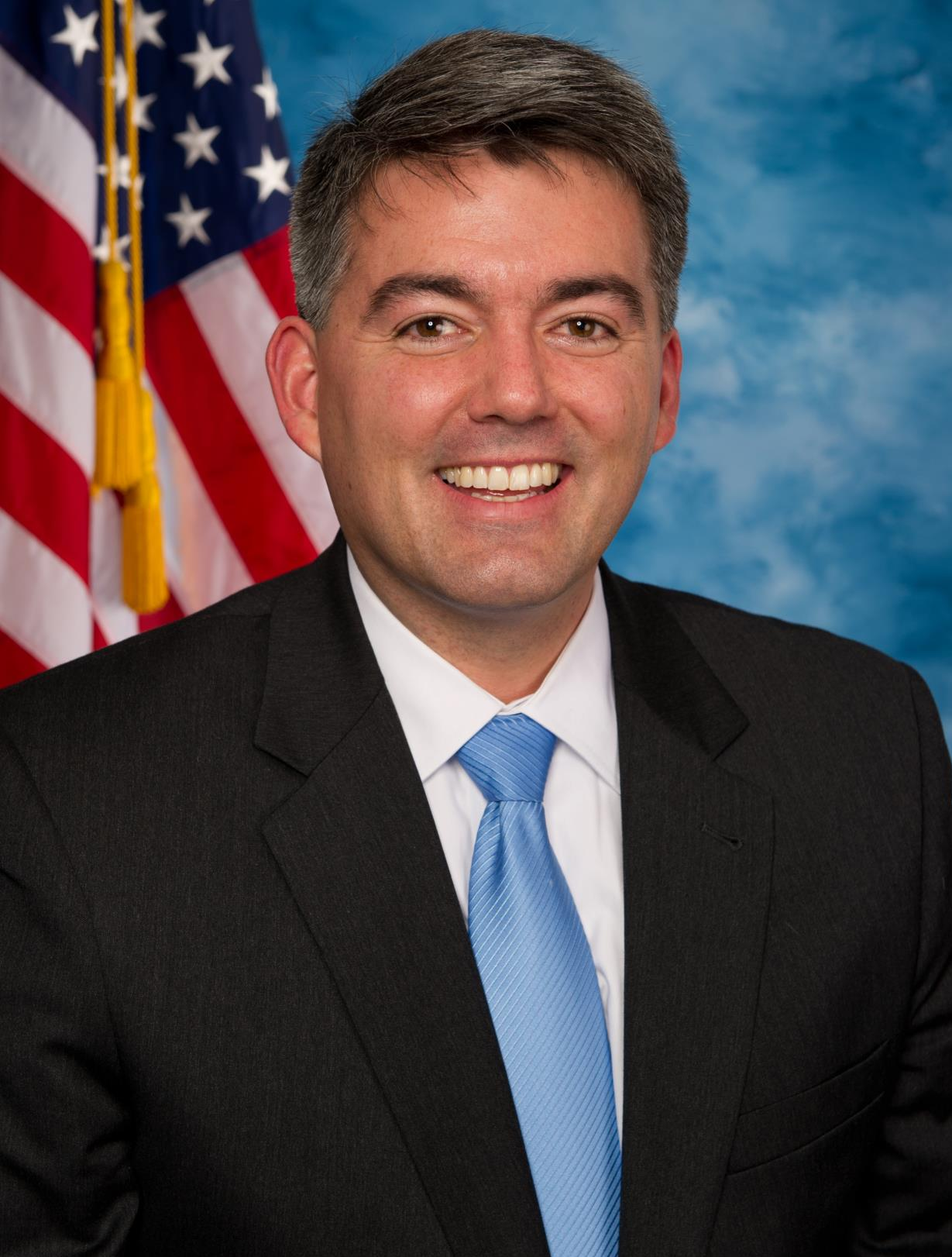

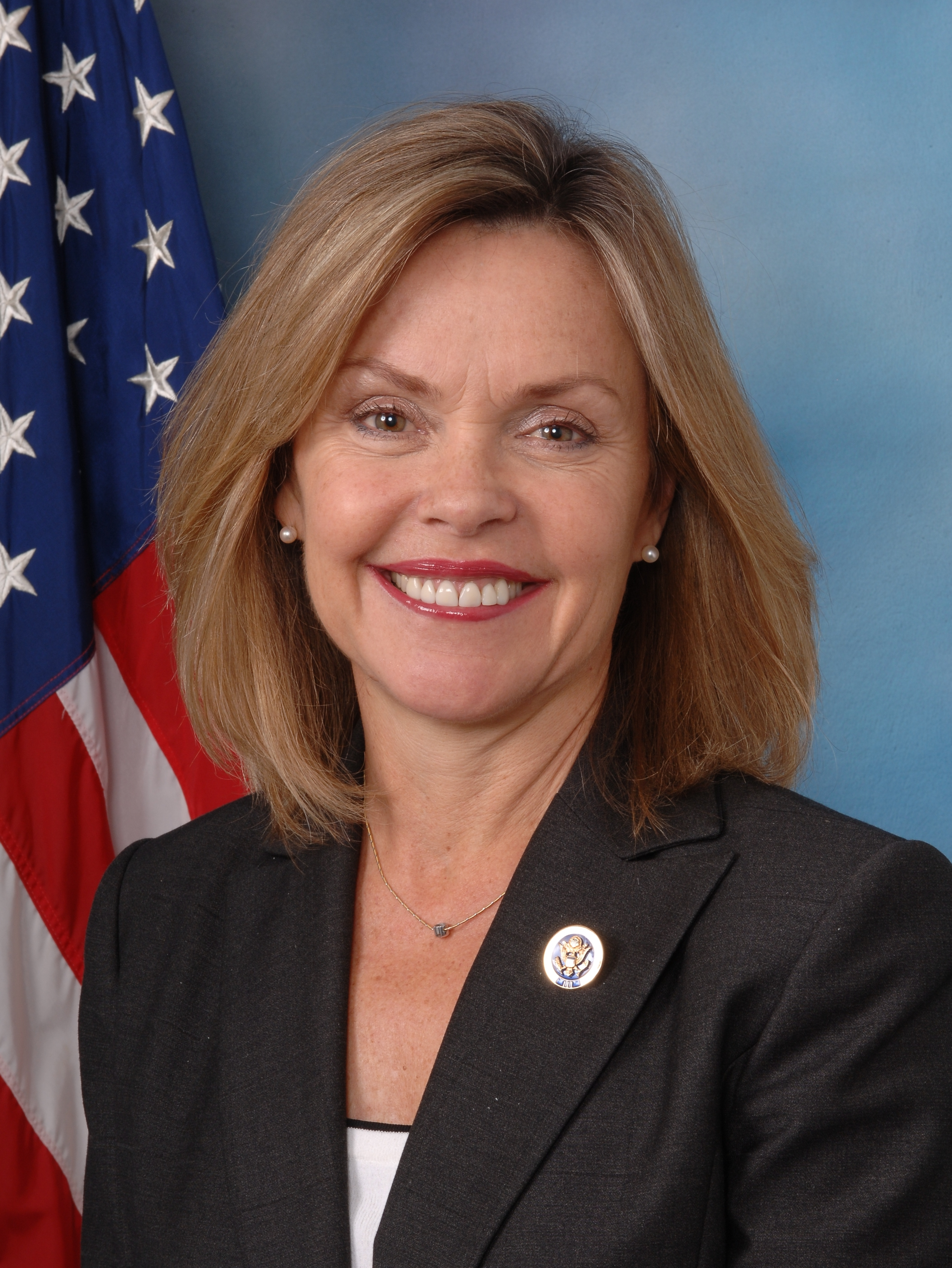
Nominee	Cory Gardner	Betsy Markey
Party	Republican	Democratic
Popular vote	138,634	109,249
Percentage	52.5%	41.4%
- County results Gardner: 50–60% 60–70% 70–80% 80–90% Markey: 40–50% 50–60%
U.S. Representative before election
Betsy Markey
Democratic
Elected U.S. Representative
Cory Gardner
Republican

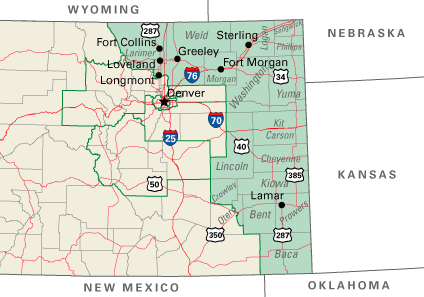

Incumbent Democrat Betsy Markey, who had represented this conservative east Colorado-based district since 2009, ran for re-election. She was elected with % of the vote in 2008 and the district had a PVI of R+6.

=== Democratic primary ===
==== Candidates ====
===== Nominee =====
- Betsy Markey, incumbent U.S. Representative

==== Results ====
Democratic primary results
Party	Candidate	Votes	%
Democratic	Betsy Markey (incumbent)	33,982	100.0
Total votes		33,982	100.0

=== Republican primary ===
==== Candidates ====
===== Nominee =====
- Cory Gardner, state representative

===== Withdrawn =====
- Diggs Brown, financial adviser, military veteran and Fort Collins City Council member
- Tom Lucero, businessman and former member of University of Colorado Board of Regents
- Dean Madere, conservative activist

===== Declined =====
- Greg Brophy, state senator
- Ken Buck, Weld County District Attorney
- Mark Hillman, former acting State Treasurer and Majority Leader of the state senate
- Bill Jerke, former Weld County Commissioner
- Marilyn Musgrave, former U.S. Representative

==== Results ====
Republican primary results
Party	Candidate	Votes	%
Republican	Cory Gardner	57,358	100.0
Total votes		57,358	100.0

=== Libertarian primary ===
==== Candidates ====
===== Withdrawn =====
- Jassen Bowman

=== Constitution primary ===
==== Candidates ====
===== Nominee =====
- Doug Aden, small business owner

=== Unity primary ===
==== Candidates ====
===== Withdrawn =====
- Mike Nelson, oilfield worker

=== General election ===
==== Campaign ====
Markey, seen as a vulnerable member of Congress faced a tough challenge from Gardner. Challenger Gardner attacked Markey for supporting the 2009 Stimulus, asking rhetorically, "You want a shovel ready project we don't need? It's digging more debt," to which Markey responded, "I don't need to be lectured by someone who actually wants to tax the wind," a reference to a bill supported by Gardner in the state legislature that some claimed would allow for taxation of wind energy. Gardner further attacked Markey for a variety of votes that she supposedly cast in a television advertisement, but controversy ensued and a local Fox News affiliate yanked the ad off the air when it came to surface that the votes that Congresswoman Markey "cast" were actually cast by Massachusetts Congressman Ed Markey.

The Denver Post, citing Gardner's reputation as a "go-to guy in the legislature" and praising his motivation to bring "fiscal discipline to government," endorsed the Republican, expressing their discontent with Markey for "[straying] to the left" during her time in Congress.

==== Endorsements ====
Betsy Markey (D)

Organizations

- Blue Dog Coalition
- Democratic Congressional Campaign Committee "Frontline" Program

Newspapers

- Boulder Weekly
Cory Gardner (R)

Organizations

- Tea Party Express

Newspapers

- The Denver Post

==== Polling ====
Poll source	Date(s) administered	Sample size	Margin of error	Betsy Markey (D)	Cory Gardner (R)	Undecided
ccAdvertising (R)	October 1, 2010	2,743 (LV)	±?%	35%	47%	18%
Penn Schoen Berland (The Hill/ANGA)	September 25–27, 2010	391 (LV)	±5.0	41%	44%	14%
Bennett, Petts & Normington	September 6–7, 2010	400 (LV)	±?	38%	38%	24%
Ayres, McHenry & Associates (R–American Action Forum)	August 23–28, 2010	400 (LV)	±4.9	39%	50%	11%

==== Predictions ====
Source	Ranking	As of
The Cook Political Report	Lean R (flip)	November 1, 2010
Rothenberg	Likely R (flip)	November 1, 2010
Sabato's Crystal Ball	Lean R (flip)	November 1, 2010
RCP	Lean R (flip)	November 1, 2010
CQ Politics	Likely R (flip)	October 28, 2010
New York Times	Lean R (flip)	November 1, 2010
FiveThirtyEight	Likely R (flip)	November 1, 2010

==== Results ====
Though polls indicated that Gardner held a narrow lead at best, Markey ultimately was defeated in her bid for a second term by a fairly comfortable eleven point margin of victory.

Colorado's 4th congressional district election, 2010
Party	Candidate	Votes	%
Republican	Cory Gardner	138,634	52.5
Democratic	Betsy Markey (incumbent)	109,249	41.4
American Constitution	Doug Aden	12,312	4.7
Independent	Ken Waskiewicz	3,986	1.5
Majority		29,385	11.1
Turnout		271,316	75.5
Registered electors		359,391	
Republican gain from Democratic			

==== Finances ====
===== Campaigns =====
Candidate (party)	Raised	Spent	Cash on hand
Betsy Markey (D)	$3,505,293	$3,516,268	$10,617
Cory Gardner (R)	$2,426,591	$2,407,602	$18,989
Doug Aden (C)	Unreported		
Ken Waskiewicz (I)	Unreported		

===== Outside Spending =====
Candidate (party)	Supported	Opposed
Betsy Markey (D)	$297,186	$876,129
Cory Gardner (R)	$251,250	$742,904
Doug Aden (C)	$0	$341,842
Ken Waskiewicz (I)	$0	$0

== District 5 ==
2010 Colorado's 5th congressional district election
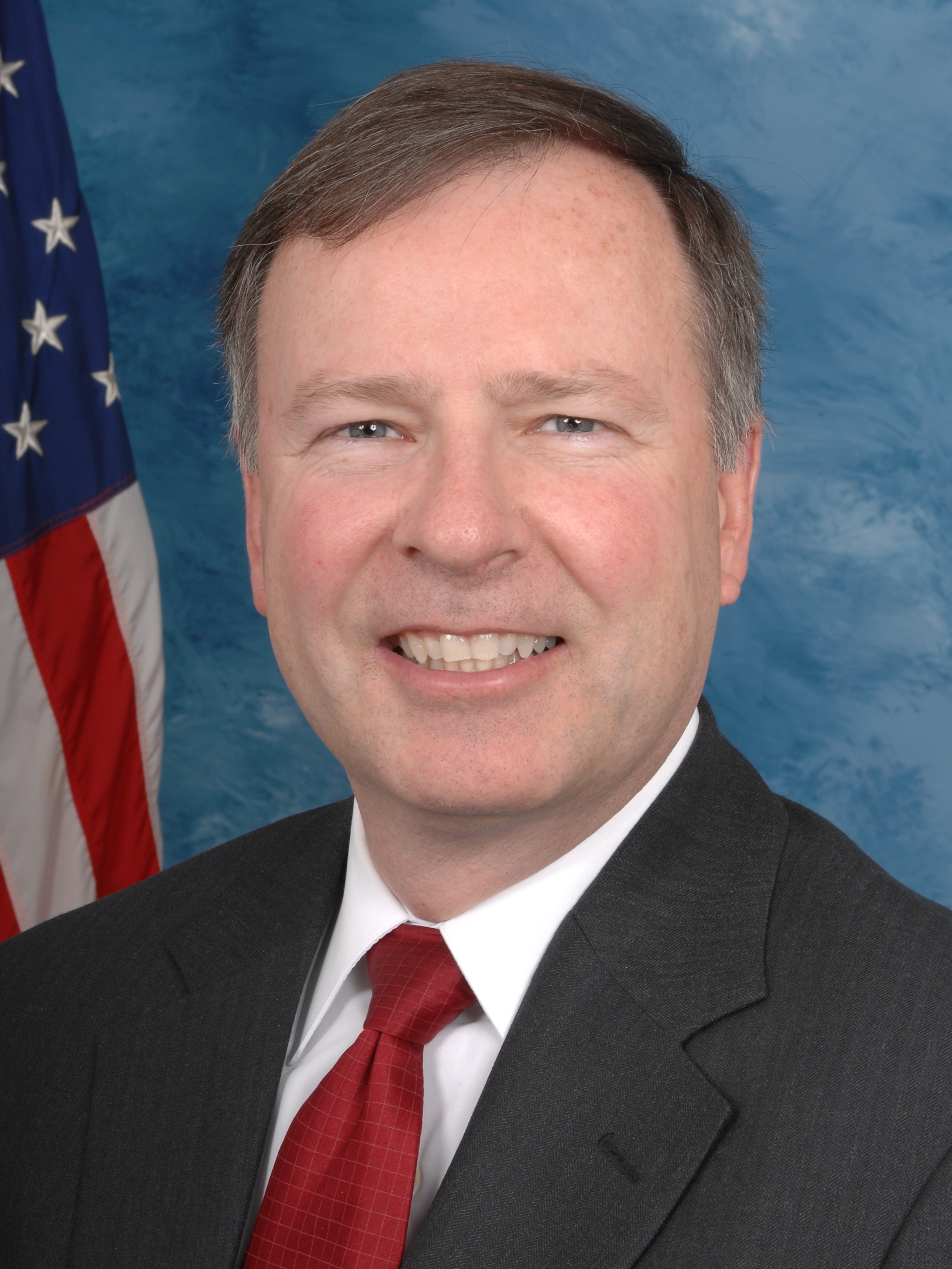

Nominee	Doug Lamborn	Kevin Bradley
Party	Republican	Democratic
Popular vote	152,829	113,027
Percentage	65.8%	29.3%
- County results Lamborn: 50–60% 60–70% Bradley: 50–60%
U.S. Representative before election
Doug Lamborn
Republican
Elected U.S. Representative
Doug Lamborn
Republican

Incumbent Republican Doug Lamborn, who had represented this conservative district based in Colorado Springs and its suburbs district since 2005, ran for re-election. He was re-elected with 60.0% of the vote in 2006 and the district had a PVI of R+14.

=== Republican primary ===
==== Candidates ====
===== Nominee =====
- Doug Lamborn, incumbent U.S. Representative

===== Declined =====
- Jeff Crank, Greater Colorado Springs Chamber of Commerce vice president and candidate for this seat in 2006 & 2006
- Bentley Rayburn, United States Air Force Major General and candidate for this seat in 2006 & 2008

==== Results ====
Republican primary results
Party	Candidate	Votes	%
Republican	Doug Lamborn (incumbent)	60,906	100.0
Total votes		60,906	100.0

=== Democratic primary ===
==== Candidates ====
===== Nominee =====
- Kevin Bradley, businessman

==== Results ====
Democratic primary results
Party	Candidate	Votes	%
Democratic	Kevin Bradley	20,814	100.0
Total votes		20,814	100.0

=== Libertarian primary ===
==== Candidates ====
===== Nominee =====
- Jerell Klaver, businessman

=== General election ===
==== Endorsements ====
Doug Lamborn (R)

Organizations

- Tea Party Express

Newspapers

- The Denver Post

==== Predictions ====
Source	Ranking	As of
The Cook Political Report	Safe R	November 1, 2010
Rothenberg	Safe R	November 1, 2010
Sabato's Crystal Ball	Safe R	November 1, 2010
RCP	Safe R	November 1, 2010
CQ Politics	Safe R	October 28, 2010
New York Times	Safe R	November 1, 2010
FiveThirtyEight	Safe R	November 1, 2010

==== Results ====
Colorado's 5th congressional district election, 2010
Party	Candidate	Votes	%
Republican	Doug Lamborn (incumbent)	152,829	65.8
Democratic	Kevin Bradley	68,039	29.3
American Constitution	Brian Scott	5,886	2.5
Libertarian	Jerell Klaver	5,680	2.4
Majority		84,790	36.5
Turnout		238,902	69.6
Registered electors		343,288	
Republican hold			

==== Finances ====
===== Campaigns =====
Candidate (party)	Raised	Spent	Cash on hand
Doug Lamborn (R)	$338,476	$182,883	$154,563
Kevin Bradley (D)	Unreported		
Jerell Klaver (L)	Unreported		
Brian Scott (C)	Unreported		

===== Outside Spending =====
Candidate (party)	Supported	Opposed
Doug Lamborn (R)	$0	$0
Kevin Bradley (D)	$5,068	$0
Jerell Klaver (L)	$0	$0
Brian Scott (C)	$0	$0

== District 6 ==
2010 Colorado's 6th congressional district election
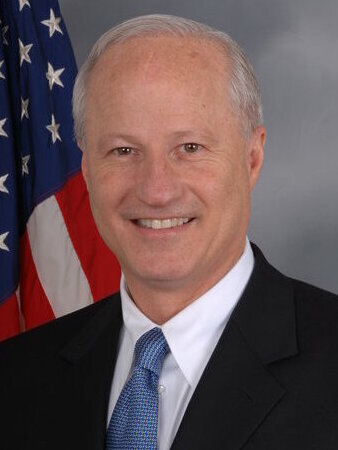

Nominee	Mike Coffman	John Flerlage
Party	Republican	Democratic
Popular vote	217,368	104,104
Percentage	65.7%	31.5%
- County results Coffman: 60–70% 70–80%
U.S. Representative before election
Mike Coffman
Republican
Elected U.S. Representative
Mike Coffman
Republican

Incumbent Republican Mike Coffman, who had represented this solidly conservative district based in the southern Denver suburbs and some parts of Aurora, since 2009, ran for re-election. He was re-elected with 60.7% of the vote in 2008 and the district had a PVI of R+8.

=== Republican primary ===
==== Candidates ====
===== Nominee =====
- Mike Coffman, incumbent U.S. Representative

==== Results ====
Republican primary results
Party	Candidate	Votes	%
Republican	Mike Coffman (incumbent)	81,067	100.0
Total votes		81,067	100.0

=== Democratic primary ===
==== Candidates ====
===== Nominee =====
- John Flerlage, retired U.S. Marine Corps Lieutenant Colonel and airline pilot

==== Results ====
Democratic primary results
Party	Candidate	Votes	%
Democratic	John Flerlage	37,950	100.0
Total votes		37,950	100.0

=== Libertarian primary ===
==== Candidates ====
===== Nominee =====
- Rob McNealy, small business owner and community activist

=== General election ===
==== Endorsements ====
Mike Coffman (R)

Organizations

- Tea Party Express

Newspapers

- The Denver Post

==== Predictions ====
Source	Ranking	As of
The Cook Political Report	Safe R	November 1, 2010
Rothenberg	Safe R	November 1, 2010
Sabato's Crystal Ball	Safe R	November 1, 2010
RCP	Safe R	November 1, 2010
CQ Politics	Safe R	October 28, 2010
New York Times	Safe R	November 1, 2010
FiveThirtyEight	Safe R	November 1, 2010

==== Results ====
Colorado's 6th congressional district election, 2010
Party	Candidate	Votes	%
Republican	Mike Coffman (incumbent)	217,368	65.7
Democratic	John Flerlage	104,104	31.5
Libertarian	Rob McNealy	9,466	2.9
Write-in		5	0.0
Majority		113,264	34.2
Turnout		345,534	75.8
Registered electors		455,805	
Republican hold			

==== Finances ====
===== Campaigns =====
Candidate (party)	Raised	Spent	Cash on hand
Mike Coffman (R)	$904,466	$576,556	$411,537
John Flerlage (D)	$152,157	$151,280	$876
Rob McNealy (L)	$24,052	$24,138	$0

===== Outside Spending =====
Candidate (party)	Supported	Opposed
Mike Coffman (R)	$0	$0
John Flerlage (D)	$6,952	$0
Rob McNealy (L)	$0	$0

== District 7 ==
2010 Colorado's 7th congressional district election
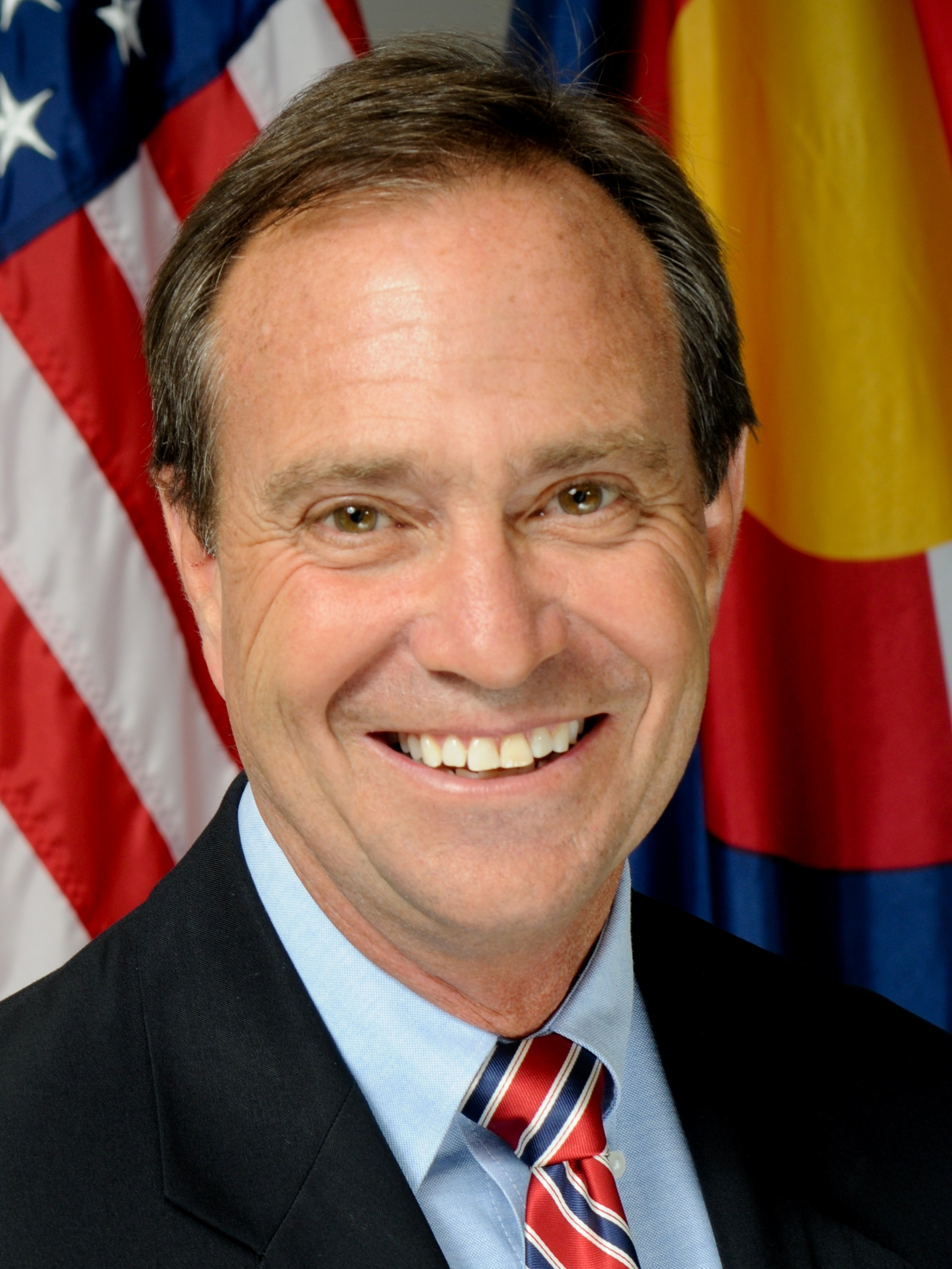

Nominee	Ed Perlmutter	Ryan Frazier
Party	Democratic	Republican
Popular vote	112,667	88,026
Percentage	53.4%	41.8%
- County results Perlmutter: 50–60%
U.S. Representative before election
Ed Perlmutter
Democratic
Elected U.S. Representative
Ed Perlmutter
Democratic

Incumbent Democratic Ed Perlmutter, who had represented this suburban Denver district since 2007, ran for re-election. He was elected with % of the vote in 2008 and the district had a PVI of D+4.

=== Democratic primary ===
==== Candidates ====
===== Nominee =====
- Ed Perlmutter, incumbent U.S. Representative

==== Results ====
Democratic primary results
Party	Candidate	Votes	%
Democratic	Ed Perlmutter (incumbent)	40,534	100.0
Total votes		40,534	100.0

=== Republican primary ===
==== Candidates ====
===== Nominee =====
- Ryan Frazier, Aurora City Council member

===== Eliminated in primary =====
- Lang Sias, military pilot and lawyer

==== Endorsements ====
Lang Sias

U.S. Senators

- John McCain, U.S. Senator from Arizona (1987–present) and nominee for President in 2008

Organizations

- Eagle Forum

==== Results ====
Republican primary results
Party	Candidate	Votes	%
Republican	Ryan Frazier	26,765	64.3
Republican	Lang Sias	14,835	35.7
Total votes		41,600	100.0

=== Libertarian primary ===
==== Candidates ====
===== Nominee =====
- Buck Bailey, small business owner

=== General election ===
==== Campaign ====
Both candidates levied heavy attacks against each other as election day drew nearer. Frazier attacked Perlmutter for supporting the 2009 Stimulus, decrying it as a waste of taxpayer money; Perlmutter provided evidence that a charter school that Frazier represented, as well as the city of Aurora, received stimulus money. In a bizarre moment during the campaign, the two candidates were discussing health care reform at a debate when Frazier pointed his hand at Perlmutter, who slapped it away, apologizing immediately thereafter.

The Denver Post, calling for "new blood in Congress," endorsed Frazier over Perlmutter, declaring that despite Frazier's young age of 33, "his grasp on the key issues facing the country has grown considerably since he first surfaced on the political scene." The Post, meanwhile, criticized Congressman Perlmutter for being "a solid vote for the Democratic majority" and for supporting "the Obama Administration’s over-reaching agenda."

==== Endorsements ====
Ryan Frazier (R)

Organizations

- National Republican Congressional Committee "Young Guns" Program
- Tea Party Express

Newspapers

- The Denver Post

==== Polling ====
Poll source	Date(s) administered	Sample size	Margin of error	Ed Perlmutter (D)	Ryan Frazier (R)	Other	Undecided
Magellan Data and Mapping Strategies (R)	August 8, 2010	830 (LV)	±3.4%	39%	40%	10%	11%

==== Predictions ====
Source	Ranking	As of
The Cook Political Report	Lean D	November 1, 2010
Rothenberg	Likely D	November 1, 2010
Sabato's Crystal Ball	Likely D	November 1, 2010
RCP	Safe D	November 1, 2010
CQ Politics	Likely D	October 28, 2010
New York Times	Lean D	November 1, 2010
FiveThirtyEight	Likely D	November 1, 2010

==== Results ====
Despite the nationwide swing against the Democrats, Perlmutter comfortably won re election to a third term by 11 points, with Frazier only improving 2.3% on John McCain vote share from 2008.

Colorado's 7th congressional district election, 2010
Party	Candidate	Votes	%
Democratic	Ed Perlmutter (incumbent)	112,667	53.4
Republican	Ryan Frazier	88,026	41.8
Libertarian	Buck Bailey	10,117	4.8
Majority		24,641	11.7
Turnout		215,961	73.4
Registered electors		294,412	
Democratic hold			

==== Finances ====
===== Campaigns =====
Candidate (party)	Raised	Spent	Cash on hand
Ed Perlmutter (D)	$2,443,962	$2,943,593	$45,222
Ryan Frazier (R)	$1,775,458	$1,771,943	$3,515
Buck Bailey (L)	Unreported		

===== Outside Spending =====
Candidate (party)	Supported	Opposed
Ed Perlmutter (D)	$952,596	$638,278
Ryan Frazier (R)	$129,821	$560,941
Buck Bailey (L)	$0	$0

=== Aftermath ===
In their post election round up, the website Colorado Pols described the Frazier campaign as "amateurish at best" and that he had proved to be "immature, vacuous and just plain silly in unscripted moments".
