= Colorado's 5th congressional district =

U.S. House district for Colorado

Coordinates: 38°48′56″N 105°20′39″W

- Interactive map of district boundaries since January 3, 2023
- Representative: Jeff Crank; R–Colorado Springs
- Distribution: 86.44% urban; 13.56% rural
- Population (2025): 747,964
- Median household income: $98,686
- Ethnicity: 65.6% White; 17.9% Hispanic; 6.3% Two or more races; 5.6% Black; 3.0% Asian; 1.5% other
- Cook PVI: R+5

Colorado's 5th congressional district is a congressional district in the U.S. state of Colorado. The district lies in the center of the state and comprises Colorado Springs and its suburbs including Cimarron Hills and Fort Carson.

The district is currently represented by Republican Jeff Crank. Historically one of the most Republican districts in Colorado, redistricting and growing Democratic strength in Colorado Springs and suburbs such as Cimarron Hills, Fountain, and Security-Widefield have shifted the district strongly to the left. However it is still a moderately Republican-leaning district with a Cook Partisan Voting Index rating of R+5.

== Characteristics ==
=== Politics ===
The Democratic Party recently won control of the seat, overturning Republican Party control since the district's creation. Colorado Springs, the main population center within the district, is home to many conservative Protestant organizations. Among these groups are Focus on the Family, its founder Dr. James Dobson (who was at one point considered by some to be the most influential evangelical leader in the country), New Life Church, Compassion International, HCJB, and many others. There is some Democratic strength in this district in urban Colorado Springs and some of its suburbs near Pikes Peak, but it is no match for the Republican-leaning rest of the district.

Colorado Springs also boasts a large population of both active-duty and retired military personnel and is home to many companies in the defense industry, all of which are demographics that tend to vote for Republicans. Throughout the district's history, Republicans have won by comfortable margins. From 1996 through 2004, Republican Joel Hefley usually won reelections with about 70% of the vote. George W. Bush received 66% of the vote in this district in 2004.

However, unlike the nearby 4th that is trending more Republican by the year, the 5th is becoming slightly less Republican due to demographic changes. Notably, after redistricting carved away all of the district's territory outside El Paso County, the Democrats crossed the 40 percent mark for only the second time since the district's creation.

=== Economy ===
Because of the strong military presence, Colorado Springs's economy is usually very stable and frequently sees growth. The western portions of the district are mostly small mountain towns whose economy depends on ranching, farming, mining, and tourism.

=== Tourism ===
Millions of tourists visit the Colorado Springs region every year, primarily to visit Garden of the Gods, United States Olympic Training Center, U.S. Olympic & Paralympic Museum, Pikes Peak, and the United States Air Force Academy.

=== Military ===
Colorado Springs, located within the district, is home to multiple military installations. Fort Carson, the United States Air Force Academy, Peterson Space Force Base, Schriever Space Force Base, and NORAD are also all located within the district. There are more veterans living in the Colorado Fifth than any other district in America.

== History ==
=== 1990s ===
Following the 1990 U.S. census and associated realignment of Colorado congressional districts, the 5th congressional district consisted of El Paso and Teller counties, as well as portions of Arapahoe, Douglas, and Fremont counties.

=== 2000s ===
Following the 2000 U.S. census and associated realignment of Colorado congressional districts, the 5th congressional district consisted of Chaffee, El Paso, Fremont, Lake and Teller counties, as well as most of Park County.

=== 2010s ===
Following the 2010 U.S. census and associated realignment of Colorado congressional districts, the 5th congressional district consisted of Chaffee, El Paso, Fremont, and Teller counties, as well as most of Park County.

=== 2020s ===
Following the 2020 U.S. census and associated realignment of Colorado congressional districts, the 5th congressional district consisted of most of El Paso County, except for slivers that were drawn into the 4th and 7th districts.

== Composition ==
For the 118th and successive Congresses (based on redistricting following the 2020 census), the district contains all or portions of the following counties and communities:

El Paso County (18)

Air Force Academy, Black Forest, Cascade-Chipita Park, Cimarron Hills, Colorado Springs, Ellicott, Fort Carson, Fountain, Gleneagle, Manitou Springs, Monument, Palmer Lake, Peyton, Rock Creek Park, Security-Widefield, Stratmoor, Palmer Lake, Woodmoor

== Recent election results from statewide races ==
Year	Office	Results
2008	President	McCain 58% - 40%
2008	Senate	Schaffer 56% - 39%
2010	Senate	Buck 60% - 34%
2010	Secretary of State	Gessler 64% - 30%
2010	Treasurer	Stapleton 64% - 36%
2010	Attorney General	Suthers 70% - 30%
2012	President	Romney 60% - 40%
2014	Senate	Gardner 62% - 33%
2016	President	Trump 56% - 34%
2016	Senate	Glenn 58% - 36%
2018	Governor	Stapleton 56% - 40%
2018	Attorney General	Brauchler 58% - 38%
2020	President	Trump 53% - 43%
2020	Senate	Gardner 56% - 41%
2022	Senate	O'Dea 52% - 44%
2022	Governor	Ganahl 50% - 47%
2022	Secretary of State	Anderson 53% - 44%
2022	Treasurer	Sias 55% - 41%
2022	Attorney General	Kellner 55% - 42%
2024	President	Trump 53% - 44%

== List of members representing the district ==
Member	Party	Term duration	Cong ress	Electoral history	District location
District created January 3, 1973
William L. Armstrong (Aurora)	Republican	January 3, 1973 – January 3, 1979	93rd 94th 95th	Elected in 1972. Re-elected in 1974. Re-elected in 1976. Retired to run for U.S. senator.	
Ken Kramer (Colorado Springs)	Republican	January 3, 1979 – January 3, 1987	96th 97th 98th 99th	Elected in 1978. Re-elected in 1980. Re-elected in 1982. Re-elected in 1984. Retired to run for U.S. senator.	
Joel Hefley (Colorado Springs)	Republican	January 3, 1987 – January 3, 2007	100th 101st 102nd 103rd 104th 105th 106th 107th 108th 109th	Elected in 1986. Re-elected in 1988. Re-elected in 1990. Re-elected in 1992. Re-elected in 1994. Re-elected in 1996. Re-elected in 1998. Re-elected in 2000. Re-elected in 2002. Re-elected in 2004. Retired.	
Joel Hefley (Colorado Springs)	Republican	January 3, 1987 – January 3, 2007	100th 101st 102nd 103rd 104th 105th 106th 107th 108th 109th	Elected in 1986. Re-elected in 1988. Re-elected in 1990. Re-elected in 1992. Re-elected in 1994. Re-elected in 1996. Re-elected in 1998. Re-elected in 2000. Re-elected in 2002. Re-elected in 2004. Retired.	2003–2013
Doug Lamborn (Colorado Springs)	Republican	January 3, 2007 – January 3, 2025	110th 111th 112th 113th 114th 115th 116th 117th 118th	Elected in 2006. Re-elected in 2008. Re-elected in 2010. Re-elected in 2012. Re-elected in 2014. Re-elected in 2016. Re-elected in 2018. Re-elected in 2020. Re-elected in 2022. Retired.	2003–2013
Doug Lamborn (Colorado Springs)	Republican	January 3, 2007 – January 3, 2025	110th 111th 112th 113th 114th 115th 116th 117th 118th	Elected in 2006. Re-elected in 2008. Re-elected in 2010. Re-elected in 2012. Re-elected in 2014. Re-elected in 2016. Re-elected in 2018. Re-elected in 2020. Re-elected in 2022. Retired.	2013–2023
Doug Lamborn (Colorado Springs)	Republican	January 3, 2007 – January 3, 2025	110th 111th 112th 113th 114th 115th 116th 117th 118th	Elected in 2006. Re-elected in 2008. Re-elected in 2010. Re-elected in 2012. Re-elected in 2014. Re-elected in 2016. Re-elected in 2018. Re-elected in 2020. Re-elected in 2022. Retired.	2023–present
Jeff Crank (Colorado Springs)	Republican	January 3, 2025 – present	119th	Elected in 2024. Lost re-election.	2023–present
Jessica Killin (Colorado Springs)	Democratic	Assuming office on January 3, 2027		Elected in 2026.	2023–present

== Election results ==
=== 1972 ===
United States House of Representatives elections, 1972
Party	Candidate	Votes	%
Republican	Bill Armstrong	104,214	62.33
Democratic	Byron L. Johnson	60,948	36.45
Libertarian	Pipp M. Boyls	2,028	1.22
Total votes		167,190	100.0
Republican win (new seat)			

=== 1974 ===
United States House of Representatives elections, 1974
Party	Candidate	Votes	%
Republican	Bill Armstrong (incumbent)	85,326	57.73
Democratic	Ben Galloway	56,888	38.49
Independent	Stan Johnson	5,580	3.78
Total votes		147,794	100.0
Republican hold			

=== 1976 ===
United States House of Representatives elections, 1976
Party	Candidate	Votes	%
Republican	Bill Armstrong (incumbent)	126,784	66.43
Democratic	Dorothy Hores	64,067	33.57
Total votes		190,851	100.0
Republican hold			

=== 1978 ===
United States House of Representatives elections, 1978
Party	Candidate	Votes	%
Republican	Ken Kramer	91,933	59.78
Democratic	Gerry Frank	52,914	34.41
Independent	L.W. Dan Bridges	8,933	5.81
Total votes		153,780	100.0
Republican hold			

=== 1980 ===
United States House of Representatives elections, 1980
Party	Candidate	Votes	%
Republican	Ken Kramer (incumbent)	177,319	72.41
Democratic	Ed Schreiber	62,003	25.32
Libertarian	John A. Lanning	5,578	2.27
Total votes		244,900	100.0
Republican hold			

=== 1982 ===
United States House of Representatives elections, 1982
Party	Candidate	Votes	%
Republican	Ken Kramer (incumbent)	84,479	59.55
Democratic	Thomas Cronin	57,392	40.45
Total votes		141,871	100.0
Republican hold			

=== 1984 ===
United States House of Representatives elections, 1984
Party	Candidate	Votes	%
Republican	Ken Kramer (incumbent)	163,654	78.59
Democratic	William Geffen	44,588	21.41
Total votes		206,242	100.0
Republican hold			

=== 1986 ===
United States House of Representatives elections, 1986
Party	Candidate	Votes	%
Republican	Joel Hefley	121,153	69.77
Democratic	Bill Story	52,488	30.23
Total votes		173,641	100.0
Republican hold			

=== 1988 ===
United States House of Representatives elections, 1988
Party	Candidate	Votes	%
Republican	Joel Hefley (incumbent)	181,612	75.13
Democratic	John J. Mitchell	60,116	24.87
Total votes		241,728	100.0
Republican hold			

=== 1990 ===
United States House of Representatives elections, 1990
Party	Candidate	Votes	%
Republican	Joel Hefley (incumbent)	127,740	66.44
Democratic	Cal Johnston	57,776	30.05
Libertarian	------ L. Hamburger	6,761	3.51
Total votes		192,277	100.0
Republican hold			

=== 1992 ===
United States House of Representatives elections, 1992
Party	Candidate	Votes	%
Republican	Joel Hefley (incumbent)	173,096	71.11
Democratic	Charles A. Oriez	62,550	25.70
Libertarian	------ L. Hamburger	7,769	3.19
Total votes		243,415	100.0
Republican hold			

=== 1994 ===
United States House of Representatives elections, 1994
Party	Candidate	Votes	%
Republican	Joel Hefley (incumbent)	138,674	100.00
Total votes		138,674	100.0
Republican hold			

=== 1996 ===
==== Republican primary ====
1996 Republican Primary Congressional Election
Party	Candidate	Votes	%
Republican	Joel Hefley	36,994	76.70
Republican	Bill Hughes	11,236	23.30

==== General ====
United States House of Representatives elections, 1996
Party	Candidate	Votes	%
Republican	Joel Hefley (incumbent)	188,805	71.94
Democratic	Mike Robinson	73,660	28.06
Total votes		262,465	100.0
Republican hold			

=== 1998 ===
United States House of Representatives elections, 1998
Party	Candidate	Votes	%
Republican	Joel Hefley (incumbent)	155,790	72.71
Democratic	Ken Alford	55,609	25.95
Natural Law	Mark A. Mellot	2,871	1.34
Total votes		214,270	100.0
Republican hold			

=== 2000 ===
2000 United States House of Representatives elections in Colorado
Party	Candidate	Votes	%
Republican	Joel Hefley (incumbent)	253,330	82.70
Libertarian	Kerry Kantor	37,719	12.31
Natural Law	Randy Mackenzie	15,260	4.99
Total votes		306,309	100.0
Republican hold			

=== 2002 ===
2002 United States House of Representatives elections in Colorado
Party	Candidate	Votes	%
Republican	Joel Hefley (incumbent)	128,118	69.37
Democratic	Curtis Imrie	45,587	24.69
Libertarian	Biff Baker	10,972	5.94
Total votes		184,677	100.0
Republican hold			

=== 2004 ===
2004 United States House of Representatives elections in Colorado
Party	Candidate	Votes	%
Republican	Joel Hefley (incumbent)	193,333	70.55
Democratic	Fred Hardee	74,098	27.04
Libertarian	Arthur "Rob" Roberts	6,627	2.41
Total votes		274,058	100.0
Republican hold			

=== 2006 ===
==== Republican primary ====
2006 Republican Primary Congressional Election
Party	Candidate	Votes	%
Republican	Doug Lamborn	15,126	26.97
Republican	Jeff Crank	14,234	25.38
Republican	Bentley Rayburn	9,735	17.36
Republican	Lionel Rivera	7,213	12.86
Republican	John Wesley Anderson	6,474	11.54
Republican	Duncan Bremer	3,310	5.90

==== General ====
2006 United States House of Representatives elections in Colorado
Party	Candidate	Votes	%
Republican	Doug Lamborn	123,264	59.62
Democratic	Jay Fawcett	83,431	40.35
Republican	Richard D. Hand (as a write-in)	41	0.02
Democratic	Brian X. Scott (as a write-in)	12	0.01
Republican	Gregory S. Hollister	8	0.00
Total votes		206,756	100.0
Republican hold			

=== 2008 ===
==== Republican primary ====
2008 Republican Primary Congressional Election
Party	Candidate	Votes	%
Republican	Doug Lamborn	24,995	44%
Republican	Jeff Crank	16,794	30%
Republican	Bentley Rayburn	14,986	26%

==== General ====
2008 United States House of Representatives elections in Colorado
Party	Candidate	Votes	%
Republican	Doug Lamborn (incumbent)	183,179	60%
Democratic	Hal Bidlack	113,027	37%
Constitution	Brian X. Scott	8,894	3%
No party	Richard D. Hand	45	0.03
Total votes		305,142	100%
Republican hold			

=== 2010 ===
2010 United States House of Representatives elections in Colorado
Party	Candidate	Votes	%
Republican	Doug Lamborn (incumbent)	152,829	66%
Democratic	Kevin Bradley	68,039	29%
Constitution	Brian X. Scott	5,886	3%
Libertarian	Jerrell Klaver	5,680	2%
Total votes		232,434	100%
Republican hold			

=== 2012 ===
2012 United States House of Representatives elections in Colorado
Party	Candidate	Votes	%
Republican	Doug Lamborn (incumbent)	199,639	65%
Independent	Dave Anderson	53,318	17%
Libertarian	Jim Pirtle	22,778	7%
Green	Misha Luzov	18,284	6%
Constitution	Kenneth R. Harvell	13,312	5%
Total votes		307,231	100%
Republican hold			

=== 2014 ===
2014 United States House of Representatives elections in Colorado
Party	Candidate	Votes	%
Republican	Doug Lamborn (incumbent)	157,182	60%
Democratic	Irv Halter	105,673	40%
Total votes		262,855	100%
Republican hold			

=== 2016 ===
2016 United States House of Representatives elections in Colorado
Party	Candidate	Votes	%
Republican	Doug Lamborn (Incumbent)	225,445	62.28%
Democratic	Misty Plowright	111,676	30.85%
Libertarian	Mike McRedmond	24,872	6.87%
Total votes		361,993	100%
Republican hold			

=== 2018 ===
2018 United States House of Representatives elections in Colorado
Party	Candidate	Votes	%
Republican	Doug Lamborn (Incumbent)	184,002	57.02%
Democratic	Stephany Rose Spaulding	126,848	39.31%
Libertarian	Douglas Randall	11,795	3.65%
Write-in		71	0.02%
Total votes		322,716	100%
Republican hold			

=== 2020 ===
2020 United States House of Representatives elections in Colorado
Party	Candidate	Votes	%
Republican	Doug Lamborn (Incumbent)	249,013	57.6%
Democratic	Jillian Freeland	161,600	37.4%
Libertarian	Ed Duffett	14,777	3.4%
Independent	Marcus Allen Murphy	3,708	0.9%
Unity	Rebecca Keltie	3,309	0.8%
Total votes		432,407	100%
Republican hold			

=== 2022 ===
2022 United States House of Representatives elections in Colorado
Party	Candidate	Votes	%
Republican	Doug Lamborn (incumbent)	155,528	56.0%
Democratic	David Torres	111,978	40.3%
Libertarian	Brian Flanagan	7,079	2.5%
American Constitution	Christopher Mitchell	3,370	1.2%
Independent	Matthew Feigenbaum	9	0.0%
Total votes		277,964	100%
Republican hold			

=== 2024 ===
2024 United States House of Representatives elections in Colorado
Party	Candidate	Votes	%
Republican	Jeff Crank	197,924	54.7%
Democratic	River Gassen	147,972	40.9%
Libertarian	Michael Vance	6,458	1.8%
Independent	Joseph Gaye	4,094	1.1%
American Constitution	Christopher Mitchell	4,006	1.1%
Forward	Christopher Sweat	1,627	0.4%
Write-in		4	0.0%
Total votes		362,085	100%
Republican hold			

== Historical district boundaries ==
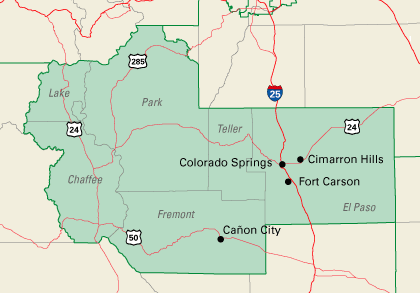
2003–2013

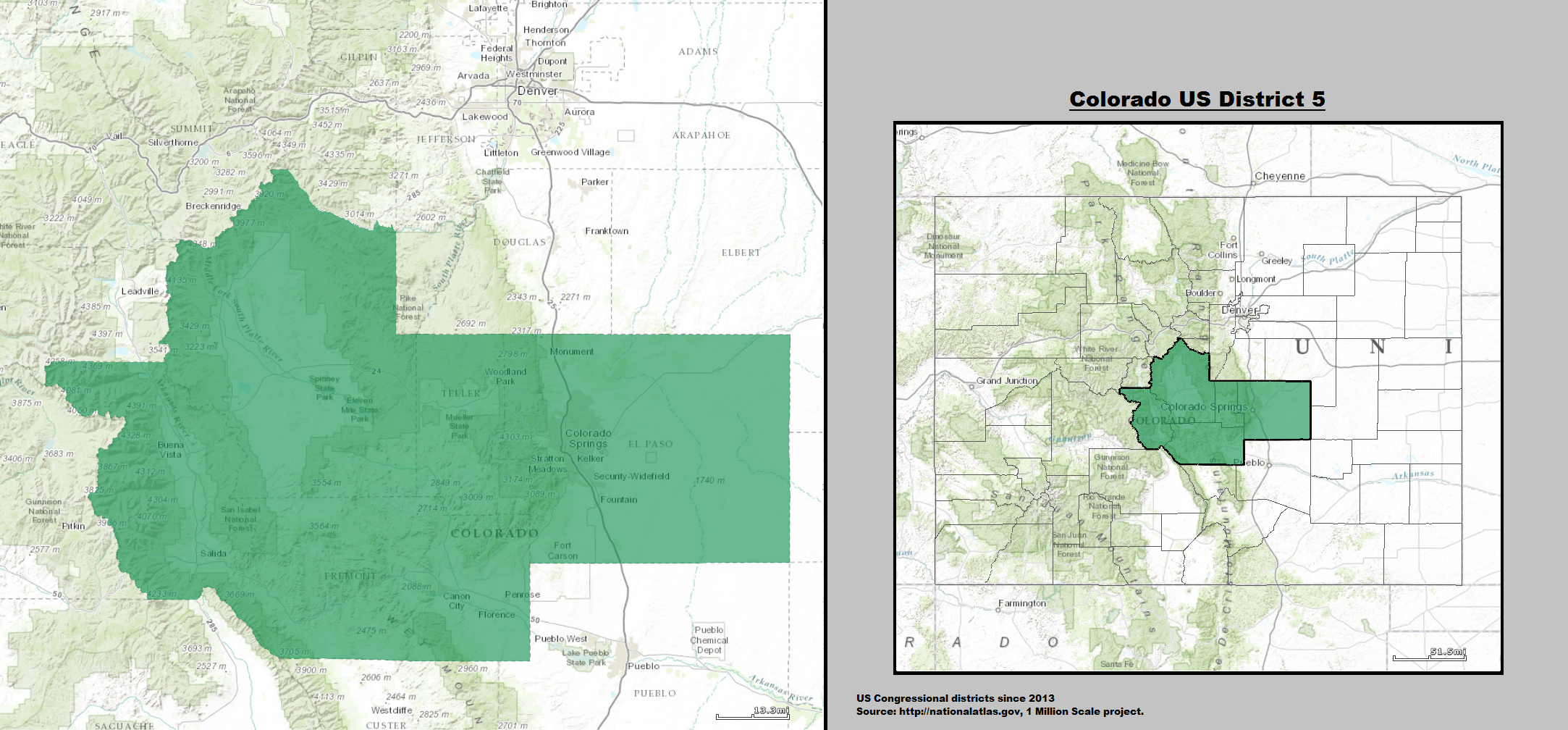
2013–2023

== See also ==
- Colorado's congressional districts
- List of United States congressional districts
