= Scott McInnis =

American politician (born 1953)

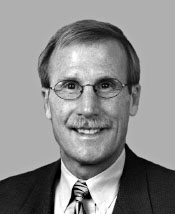

Member of the U.S. House of Representatives from Colorado's 3rd district
- In office January 3, 1993 – January 3, 2005
- Preceded by: Ben Nighthorse Campbell
- Succeeded by: John Salazar

Member of the Colorado House of Representatives from the 57th district
- In office January 5, 1983 – January 3, 1993
- Preceded by: Kathleen Sullivan
- Succeeded by: Russell George

Personal details
- Born: Stephen Scott Emory McInnis; May 9, 1953 (age 73) Glenwood Springs, Colorado, U.S.
- Party: Republican
- Spouse: Lori Smith
- Education: Fort Lewis College (BA); St. Mary's University (JD)

Stephen Scott Emory McInnis (born May 9, 1953) is an American politician and lawyer who was a Republican member of the U.S. House of Representatives for Colorado's 3rd congressional district from 1993 to 2005. In August 2010, McInnis lost his bid to become the Republican nominee for governor of Colorado after a plagiarism accusation. In November 2014, McInnis was elected a member of the Mesa County Board of County Commissioners, serving until January 2023.

The McInnis Canyons National Conservation Area, west of Grand Junction, is named for him.

== Education and professional history ==
Born in Glenwood Springs, Colorado, McInnis graduated from Glenwood Springs High School and attended Mesa State College in Grand Junction, Colorado. He earned a B.A. from Fort Lewis College in 1975 and a J.D. from St. Mary's University in San Antonio, Texas, in 1980.

== Career ==
McInnis served as a police officer in Glenwood Springs, worked as a hospital director, and started a law practice in Colorado.

McInnis is a member of the American Legislative Exchange Council (ALEC) and is an honorary adviser for the National Student Leadership Conference.

=== Colorado House of Representatives ===
From 1983 to 1993, McInnis served in the state house of representatives, where he was elected House majority leader and served as chairman of the Agriculture and Natural Resources Committee.

=== U.S. Congress ===
In 1992, McInnis was elected to the U.S. House of Representatives representing Colorado's 3rd district and served six terms, from January 1993 to January 2005. Following an investigation into the killing of Chandra Levy, McInnis "proposed that the House of Representatives adopt strict rules prohibiting members from having romantic or sexual relationships with interns they supervise." While in Congress, McInnis held a position on the Committee on Ways and Means.

Along with former Senator Ben Nighthorse Campbell, McInnis sponsored legislation to redesignate Black Canyon of the Gunnison National Monument as a national park in 1999. In 2000, McInnis, Nighthorse Campbell, and Senator Wayne Allard authored the Great Sand Dunes National Park Act. Four years later, the Great Sand Dunes became the country's 58th national park.

While in office, McInnis received numerous awards. He was named "Person of the Decade" by The Glenwood Post in 1999 and "Best Local Government Official" by The Daily Sentinel from 1999 to 2003. Other awards Scott has received include the Colorado Association of Homebuilders' Award for Government Service, the Legislator of the Year Award from the Colorado Wildlife Federation, the Golden Bulldog Award from Watchdogs of the Treasury, the National Security Leadership Award from the American Security Council, the Sound Dollar Award from the Free Congress Foundation, the Spirit of Free Enterprise Award from the U.S. Chamber of Commerce, the Hero of the Taxpayer Award from The Americans for Tax Reform, the Tax Fighter Award from the National Tax Limitation Committee and the Friend of Farm Bureau award from the American Farm Bureau Federation.

McInnis once employed Josh Penry, who is now a former Colorado state senator, and McInnis has been described as Penry's political mentor.

==== Campaign scrutiny ====
McInnis's congressional campaign committee came under scrutiny in 2005 by the Federal Election Commission after Democrats filed a complaint alleging that the campaign improperly issued payments to McInnis's wife for her work as campaign manager in 2004, when Scott McInnis was not actively seeking office. McInnis's campaign explained that Lori McInnis was employed by the campaign committee to maintain campaign archives, direct money to other campaigns, and act as liaison with the accounting firm retained by the campaign. McInnis's chief of staff stated that it was "naive to assume that simply because Congressman McInnis is not seeking re-election that we aren't participating in the election." The FEC ultimately dismissed the complaint and found no evidence of wrongdoing by the McInnis campaign.

After being regarded as the early Republican frontrunner in Colorado's 2008 U.S. Senate election, McInnis decided not to enter the race, citing family reasons.

=== 2010 gubernatorial election ===
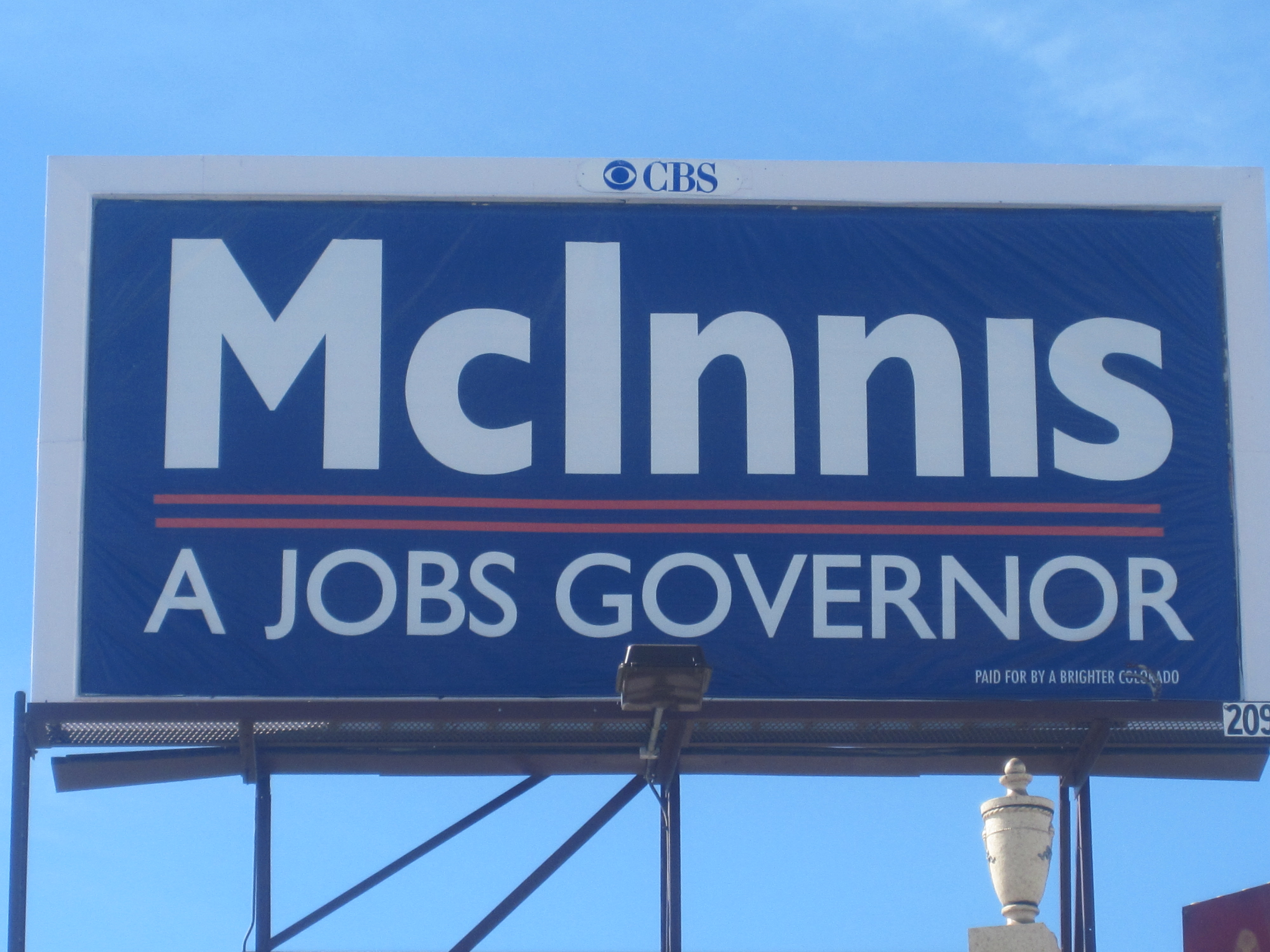
McInnis gubernatorial sign in Denver, Colorado

McInnis had been mentioned as a possible candidate for either the United States Senate or the Colorado governorship in 2010. Although he stated that he was not planning to seek the Senate seat, he did indicate some interest in challenging incumbent Bill Ritter for Colorado's top executive office. Ritter later announced his retirement. On May 21, 2009, McInnis officially announced his candidacy for Governor. Though he did not gain the nomination at the party convention, he was widely considered the front runner for the Republican nomination until accusations of plagiarism gained attention. In the August 10 primary he lost the nomination by slightly more than 1 percent of the ballots cast to entrepreneur Dan Maes.

==== Plagiarism story ====
In 2005, after leaving Congress, McInnis received a two-year fellowship at the Hasan Family Foundation. He was paid $300,000 for speaking engagements and to "research and write a monthly article on water issues that can be distributed to media and organizations as well as be available on the Internet." Soon after he started his fellowship, McInnis took a full-time job at the firm Hogan & Hartson (now Hogan Lovells).

In 2010, McInnis's writing for the Hasan Foundation, a total of 150 pages in 23 parts, was posted to the foundation's website. Teresa Fishman, director of the Center for Academic Integrity at Clemson University, reviewed McInnis's work and called several of the parts a clear case of plagiarism. "Both ... ideas and words [were] lifted" from a 20-year-old essay by now-Colorado Supreme Court Justice Gregory J. Hobbs Jr.. A McInnis spokesperson said that McInnis "relied on the research and expertise" of Rolly Fischer, a Glenwood Springs engineer who worked at the Colorado River Water Conservation District, and Fischer was the one who handled the parts that were accused of being plagiarism. "His GOP primary challenger, Dan Maes, says McInnis should 'man up' about the plagiarism" and "faulted McInnis for blaming a research assistant." Fischer himself rebutted any effort to blame him: 'Scott's responsible for it,' he told the Post Independent and would not comment further. In a televised interview on KMGH-TV, McInnis was asked several times who actually wrote the articles and did not give a definitive answer. McInnis continued to evade the question until finally, in a written apology statement, McInnis said, "I should have been more vigilant in my review of research material Rolly submitted." The 82-year-old Fischer subsequently told KMGH-TV investigative reporter John Ferrugia that he had not known the articles were to be published; had not known McInnis had a foundation grant; had been paid a few hundred dollars for each article; had considered them private communications; and had been asked by the McInnis campaign as the story broke in July 2010 to sign a letter apologizing for failing to provide attribution. Fischer said he would never sign the letter, and felt that McInnis had lied to him.

An aide said McInnis had offered an apology to the judge and said McInnis hoped to meet with the judge, and in his statement McInnis apologized to voters for his "mistake.... It's unacceptable, it's inexcusable, but it was also unintentional."

The Hasan foundation chairwoman Seeme Hasan issued an initial statement saying in part, "We will conduct an independent, internal investigation and if the allegations are proven to be true, we will demand Mr. McInnis return all monies paid to him by the Foundation." Hasan's husband Dr. Malik Hasan, a foundation board member, said he had hired McInnis as a fellow. Speaking only for himself, he said he was "deeply disappointed by the quantity and quality of McInnis's work, [having among other things] ... expected it would be a full- or substantial-time job. ... I am doubly disappointed since learning of the plagiarism. ... I'm going to suggest [he] return a substantial amount of the money to the foundation." McInnis's spokesperson said McInnis "was also calling to offer apologies" to the Hasan foundation. This report characterized the foundation as "right-leaning."

Also in the 2010 election cycle, Dr. and Mrs. Hasan's son Ali failed to receive the nomination for the position of state treasurer, and did not receive endorsement from McInnis in his bid. Dr. Hasan said that "while he and his wife were upset that McInnis refused to endorse their son ..., it had nothing to do with asking McInnis for the foundation's money back."

On Jan. 6, 2011, Hogan Lovells confirmed that McInnis would not return to its Denver office.

As of May 20, 2011, McInnis has been cleared of any official ethics violations as an attorney by the Office of Attorney Regulation Counsel (OARC). Upon review of the evidence and interviews with key witnesses, the attorney regulation counsel determined there was insufficient evidence to support a claim of a violation of the disciplinary rules. Additionally, "Regulation Counsel John S. Gleason says the Denver Post reported erroneous facts. 'While both Fisher [sic] and [Hasan Family Foundation Chairwoman Seeme] Hasan provided contradictory accounts to the press at the time this issue was raised by the Denver Post, a more thorough review of their archived materials demonstrates that both had forgotten several specific communications with McInnis that had occurred several years before,' states Gleason."

Various correspondences between Rollie Fischer and McInnis demonstrate that in 2005, McInnis instructed Fischer not to plagiarize any work in the articles he drafted because they would likely be published by the Hasan Family Foundation. Moreover, Fischer continues to claim that his use of Justice Hobbs’ article did not constitute plagiarism, because the article was part of the "public domain". Fischer also admits that he did not disclose to McInnis that he had imported the work of Justice Hobbs. "'Mr. Fischer alone chose to import large sections of text previously written by the Honorable Justice Gregory Hobbs into one of the articles drafted for Mr. McInnis, without credit citation,' states the results of the investigation."

Additionally, as it turns out, in 2005, McInnis did disclose his retention of a research assistant to Ms. Hasan in writing, contrary to the Foundation's representation in its press release in 2010. Ms. Hasan was responsible for the daily care of her ill mother at the time of the correspondence, and claims she had simply forgotten by 2010.

"McInnis and the Hasan Foundation last summer reached a settlement agreement to repay the organization, though McInnis maintained that his only error was trusting Fischer."

"Jennifer Raiffie, who served as Tom Tancredo's communications director when he entered last year's gubernatorial race as a third-party conservative candidate, ... believes McInnis has now been publicly exonerated. ... Tancredo entered the race [after the plagiarism allegations were made against McInnis] because he felt conservatives had lost a viable candidate." Raiffie suggested that the Post should now subject to an ethics investigation. "I’m happy for Scott and his family that his name can now be cleared," Raiffie said. "The Denver Post did a job on him with this story during the campaign. Their unfair and incomplete/biased reporting cost him personally and professionally. The Denver Post did a disservice to us all in Colorado and should be investigated by Ethics Watch … like that will ever happen."

Reporting on the OARC ruling, the Post detailed how comments from the various parties in 2005, summer 2010 and in depositions with OARC as summarized by OARC varied. Fischer acknowledged his OARC deposition but declined further comment. Hasan and foundation officials questioned some of the OARC assertions and stood by their 2010 comments but also was "ready for the issue to be put to rest. Ethics Watch released a statement saying it considers the matter closed." OARC said it could not release the evidence on which it based its ruling under Colorado Supreme Court rules. McInnis did not return a phone message from the paper seeking comment.

== Electoral history ==
Colorado's 3rd congressional district: Results 1992–2002
Year	Democrat	Votes	Pct	Republican	Votes	Pct	3rd Party	Party	Votes	Pct		3rd Party	Party	Votes	Pct	
1992	Mike Callihan	114,480	44%	Scott McInnis	143,293	55%	Ki R. Nelson	Populist	4,189	2%	*					
1994	Linda Powers	63,427	30%	Scott McInnis	145,365	70%										
1996	Albert L. Gurule	82,953	31%	Scott McInnis	183,523	69%										
1998	Robert Reed Kelley	74,479	31%	Scott McInnis	156,501	66%	Barry Maggert	Libertarian	5,673	2%						
2000	Curtis Imrie	87,921	29%	Scott McInnis	199,204	66%	Drew Sakson	Libertarian	9,982	3%		Victor A. Good	Reform	5,433	2%	
2002	Denis Berckefeldt	68,160	31%	Scott McInnis	143,433	66%	J. Brent Shroyer	Libertarian	4,370	2%		Gary Swing	Natural Law	1,903	1%	*

Write-in and minor candidate notes: In 1992, write-ins received 2 votes. In 2002, Jason Alessio received 106 votes.

U.S. House of Representatives
Preceded by Ben Nighthorse Campbell	Member of the U.S. House of Representatives from Colorado's 3rd congressional district 1993–2005	Succeeded by John Salazar
U.S. order of precedence (ceremonial)
Preceded by David Skaggs as Former U.S. Representative	Order of precedence of the United States as Former U.S. Representative	Succeeded by Denny Rehberg as Former U.S. Representative
