= Lynn Hefley =

Colorado politician

Lynn Hefley is a former state legislator in Colorado. A Republican, she served in the Colorado House of Representatives for El Paso County, Colorado.

She is married to Joel Hefley. They have thee daughters.

She introduced the National Heritage Areas Policy Act. She was involved in drafting legislation to protect restaurants from claims about obesity and health related damages. She supported reforms to Colorado's juvenile justice system.
