= Curtis Imrie =

American pack burro racer (1946–2017)

- Born: Walter Curtis Imrie, Jr. September 18, 1946; Washington, D.C., U.S.
- Died: January 21, 2017 (aged 70); Denver, Colorado, U.S.
- Occupations: Radio personality, film-maker, sportsman, animal breeder, politician
- Known for: Leader of pack burro racing events
- Political party: Democratic (formerly); Independent
- Partner: Lindsey Lighthizer

Walter Curtis Imrie Jr. (September 18, 1946 – January 21, 2017) was an American radio personality, film-maker, sportsman, animal breeder, and candidate for elected political office. He was particularly noted for his role as an organizer of the pack burro races in small mining towns in the state of Colorado. He also was a competitor in the pack burro races for more than 40 years and won three world championships in the sport.

== Early life and education ==
Imrie was born in Washington, D.C., on September 18, 1946. He graduated from Northwestern University and was a member of the wrestling team there. After college, Imrie wrestled at the Greco-Roman wrestling clubs in San Francisco, California.

Imrie moved to Colorado with his family in 1967, where his family purchased Little Menokin Ranch near Buena Vista, Colorado. The ranch remained Imrie's home for the rest of his life. His life partner was Lindsey Lighthizer.

== Career ==
For much of his career and through the end of his life, Imrie maintained a website that described his three interests, which others have characterized as his "3Ds", "Donkey, Drama, and Democracy". His website can be viewed through the Wayback Machine.

Winner board in Fairplay, Colorado, recounting past burro race winners

=== Pack burro racing ===
Imrie participated in approximately 200 pack burro races, including three world championships that he won. The races were in various mining towns in Colorado, including Dillon, Colorado City, Leadville, and others.

The New York Times referred to Imrie as the "Dean of Burro Racing".

External media
- Media links for Curtis Imrie

Images
- Photographs of Imrie, including with a burro

Audio
- Audio tribute to Imrie, as broadcast by KHEN radio, following Imrie's death

Video
- Excerpt from The Lost Frontier, a film by Imrie
- Memorial film about Curtis Imrie, on Vimeo

As part of his conditioning for the pack burro races, Imrie also ran in the Boston Marathon, in the New York City Marathon, and in other marathon running events. He also completed ultramarathons such as the Leadville Trail 100.

From his ranch, Imrie bred donkeys (burros) for racing, for endurance, and for competing in animal shows, such as the Colorado State Fair and Bishop Mule Days. His approach to breeding was to cross wild donkeys that he obtained from the U.S. Bureau of Land Management with domestic donkeys from successful breeders in the United States. Imrie's donkeys often won ribbons in such competitions. His donkeys were sought by the United States Armed Forces for military operations in Afghanistan, when pack animals were needed. Some of Imrie's donkeys were purchased by the Federal government of Mexico as part of their program to re-establish burro herds.

=== Entertainment and broadcasting ===
Imrie was a movie-maker, actor, and radio-personality. After college, he moved to California, where he appeared in television commercials as his initial film roles. Imrie subsequently participated in feature films. These emphasized stories related to the western life of central Colorado.

Imrie's cinematic credits included the movies American Orpheus (1992), Chasing Tail (2008), The Rider and The Wolf (2015), and others.

Imrie starred in the film The Rider and the Wolf, with Imrie portraying mountain biker Mike Rust who disappeared under mysterious circumstances.

The documentary film Haulin' Ass included discussion of Imrie's involvement in pack burro racing.

At the time of his death, Imrie was working on a film “The Last Private Man”.

Imrie hosted a radio program "Poetry and Stories", broadcast by KHEN-FM radio. He considered his program to be a "one hour happening" that interested people should listen to live, and so the program was never recorded, by Imrie's stipulation. Imrie is an example of a cowboy poet.

Imrie often quoted the phrase, "When in doubt, print the legend." One of his movies, The Lost Frontier, started with Imrie stating "The following may or may not be true. And if it ain't then it ought to be."

=== Political campaigns ===
Imrie unsuccessfully ran for elected political office in Colorado several times during his career. Early in his campaigns for elected political office, Imrie called himself a "dimmicrat" and characterized himself as a progressive politician and an outsider. He was initially a member of the Democratic Party and later became an independent politician. In 2002, he was the runner-up candidate in the election for the United States House of Representatives in Colorado's 5th congressional district.

In 2012 and in 2014, Imrie ran as an independent candidate for the District 60 seat of the Colorado General Assembly. In 2016, he ran as a write-in candidate for Colorado's 5th congressional district.

Imrie's political campaigns typically made use of stock trailers as an advertising medium in the contested districts.

== Death ==
Imrie died of a heart attack on January 21, 2017, in Denver, Colorado, while preparing a donkey to compete in the National Western Stock Show.
