= Joel Hefley =

American politician (born 1935)

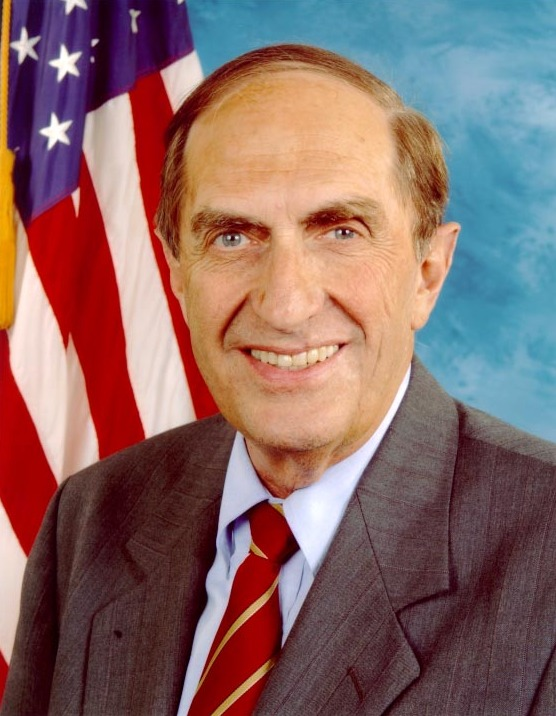

Member of the U.S. House of Representatives from Colorado's 5th district
- In office January 3, 1987 – January 3, 2007
- Preceded by: Ken Kramer
- Succeeded by: Doug Lamborn

Member of the Colorado Senate from the 9th district
- In office January 1979 – January 1987
- Preceded by: William Comer
- Succeeded by: Michael Bird

Member of the Colorado House of Representatives from the 20th district
- In office January 1977 – January 1979
- Preceded by: Bill Flanery
- Succeeded by: Bob Stephenson

Personal details
- Born: Joel Maurice Hefley; April 18, 1935 (age 91) Ardmore, Oklahoma, U.S.
- Party: Republican
- Spouse: Lynn Hefley
- Children: 3 daughters
- Education: Oklahoma Baptist University (BA); Oklahoma State University (MA)
- Hefley's voice Hefley on a House resolution to improve the military postal system. Recorded May 11, 2004

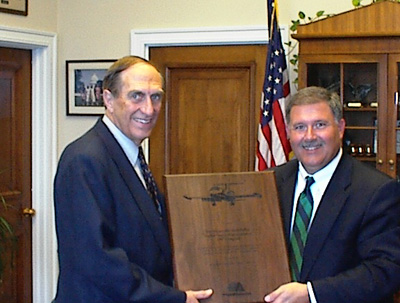
Hefley, left, receives an award from the Director of Centennial Airport.

Joel Maurice Hefley (born April 18, 1935) is an American Republican politician who served as a member of the United States House of Representatives representing the 5th Congressional District of Colorado from 1987 to 2007. His wife, Lynn Hefley, is, like him, a former member of the Colorado State House of Representatives. They have three daughters. He was Colorado’s sole congressional dean from 2005 until 2007, previously sharing it with Ben Nighthorse Campbell from 1997 until 2005.

He was born in Ardmore, the seat of Carter County in southeastern Oklahoma, earned his B.A. at Oklahoma Baptist University in Shawnee, and his M.A. at Oklahoma State University in Stillwater. He worked as a management consultant and then as executive director of the Colorado Community Planning and Research Council, a nonprofit organization. He was a member of the Colorado House of Representatives for one term in 1977–78. Hefley was subsequently elected to the Colorado Senate before entering the U.S. House of Representatives.

He served as chairman of the House Ethics Committee until 2005. His tenure propelled him from being "among the most obscure members" in the House to gaining national attention, when the Committee formally admonished House Majority Leader Tom DeLay three times; Hefley also handled the expulsion case of James Traficant, and oversaw the investigation of Alan Mollohan. Because Hefley had served 3 terms as chairman, he was term limited from serving as chairman in the 109th Congress.

When the new Congress opened in January 2005, House Republicans pushed through new rules curtailing the ways ethics investigations can be launched. While Hefley voted for the rules, he criticized the procedure, "saying he thought the changes were a mistake since they were done without bipartisan discussion." Within a month, Rep. Doc Hastings was chosen as Hefley's replacement due to Hefley's chairmanship expiring.

On February 16, 2006, Hefley ended speculation as to whether he would seek re-election in 2006, instead retiring after 10 terms in Congress, despite pledging in 1986 that he would not serve longer than three terms (6 years.)

== Gay rights ==
In 1998, Hefley introduced an amendment blocking federal funding for Executive Order 13087, an executive order issued by President Bill Clinton to prohibit discrimination against gay and lesbian employees in the federal government.

== 2006 congressional race ==
In the August GOP primary to succeed him, Hefley backed his long-time aide, former administrative director Jeff Crank, who lost in a contentious six-way race to State Senator Doug Lamborn. Hefley was incensed at the tactics used in the election, particularly a mailed brochure from the Christian Coalition of Colorado associating Crank with "public support for members and efforts of the homosexual agenda." Hefley said that he "suspected, but couldn't prove, collusion between Lamborn's campaign, which is managed by Jon Hotaling, and the Christian Coalition of Colorado, which is run by Hotaling's brother, Mark." Hefley called it "one of the sleaziest, most dishonest campaigns I've seen in a long time," and, as a result, refused to endorse Lamborn.

U.S. House of Representatives
Preceded by Ken Kramer	Member of the U.S. House of Representatives from Colorado's 5th congressional district 1987–2007	Succeeded by Doug Lamborn
Preceded by Lamar Smith	Chair of the House Ethics Committee; 2001–2005	Succeeded by Doc Hastings
U.S. order of precedence (ceremonial)
Preceded by Susan Davis as Former U.S. Representative	Order of precedence of the United States as Former U.S. Representative	Succeeded by Doc Hastings as Former U.S. Representative
