= J. D. Hammer =

American baseball player (born 1994)

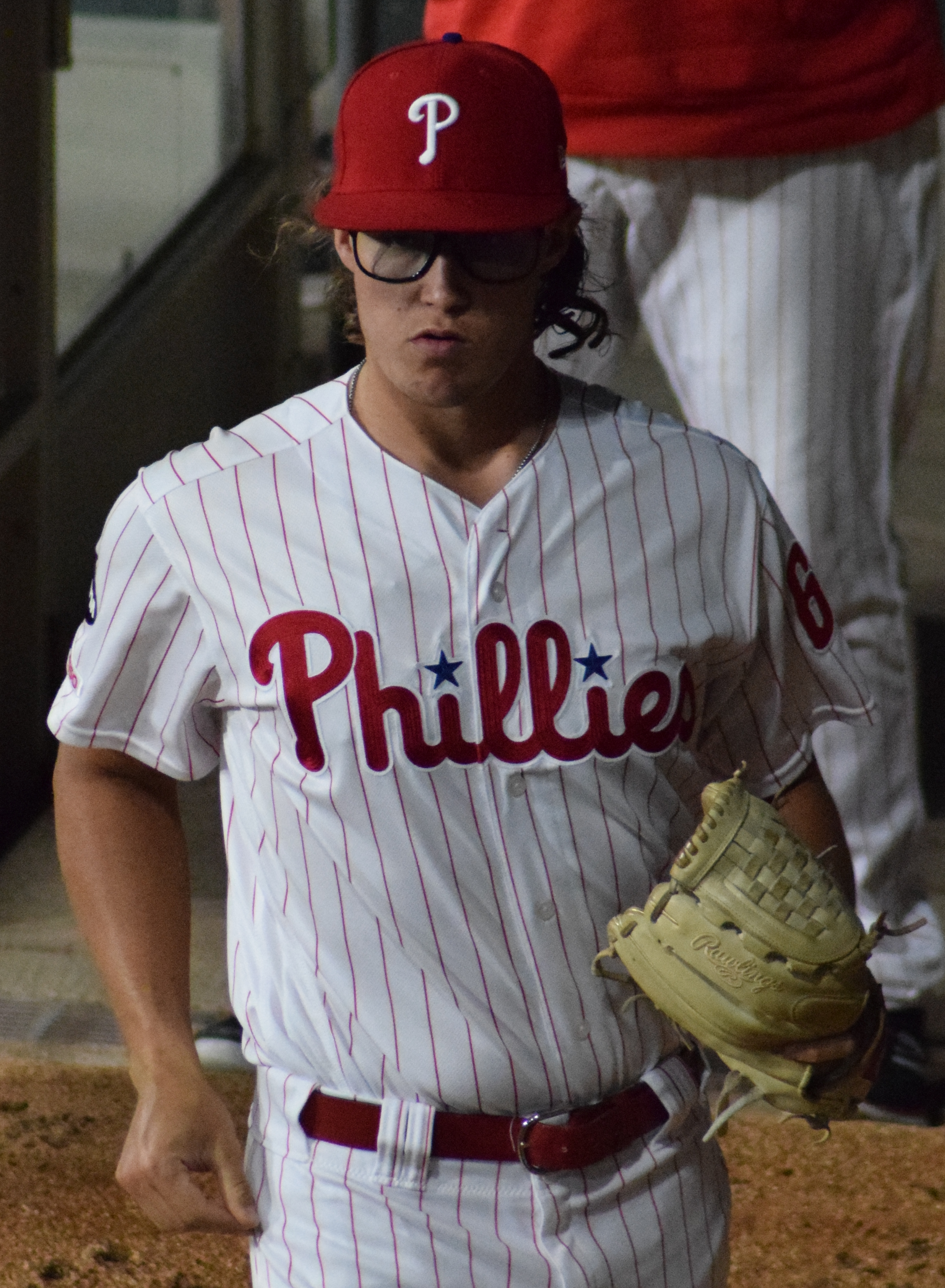
- Hammer with the Phillies in 2019
- Pitcher
- Born: July 12, 1994 (age 32); Fort Collins, Colorado, U.S.
- Batted: Right Threw: Right

MLB debut
- May 26, 2019, for the Philadelphia Phillies

Last MLB appearance
- September 16, 2021, for the Philadelphia Phillies

MLB statistics
- Win–loss record: 2–1
- Earned run average: 4.38
- Strikeouts: 35
- Stats at Baseball Reference

Teams
- Philadelphia Phillies (2019, 2021)

John Dale Hammer (born July 12, 1994) is an American former professional baseball pitcher. He played in Major League Baseball (MLB) for the Philadelphia Phillies.

Hammer was born in Fort Collins, Colorado. He was the oldest of four children, all of whom helped with their parents' pizza business and played baseball. After graduating from Fort Collins High School, he joined the Navarro College baseball team as a shortstop. His coaches transitioned him into pitching, and he became the team's ace in 2014. Hammer spent two seasons with Navarro before continuing his college baseball career with the Marshall Thundering Herd. After graduating from Marshall, the Rockies selected Hammer in the 24th round of the 2016 MLB draft.

While Hammer was playing in the Rockies' farm system, he was traded to the Phillies in exchange for Pat Neshek. He missed most of the 2018 season with an elbow injury but rose through the Phillies' minor leagues at the start of the 2019 season, making his MLB debut that May. Hammer was sent back down to Triple-A in July and remained there for the rest of the season. He did not play in 2020 due to the COVID-19 pandemic but returned to the Phillies bullpen in 2021. After being outrighted from Philadelphia's roster, Hammer re-signed with the team that drafted him before the 2022 season.

== Early life ==
Hammer was born on July 12, 1994, in Fort Collins, Colorado, the oldest of four children born to Jason and Sindi Hammer, who owned a pizza franchise in the Denver area. In addition to helping with the family business, all of the Hammer children played baseball at the encouragement of their father, who had been a shortstop for Lewis–Clark State College in Idaho. Hammer played two seasons of baseball at Fossil Ridge High School before transferring to Fort Collins High School in 2010. During his junior year, Hammer was a Second Team All-State selection after hitting .390 with eight home runs.

== College career ==
Hammer enrolled at Navarro College as a shortstop, but he did not do well as a hitter. His coaches offered him an option between becoming a pitcher or being redshirted, and he elected to pitch. He made 18 pitching appearances as a freshman in 2012, all of which came in relief, and went 2–0 with a 3.00 earned run average (ERA) and 35 strikeouts in 39 innings pitched. After gaining attention from coaches during the 2013 JUCO World Series, in which Navarro was eliminated by Palm Beach State College, Hammer became Navarro's ace in 2014. He became a starting pitcher that season, pitching his first complete game on March 13. Hammer came close to pitching a shutout, but Bossier Parish scored on an error from Navarro's center fielder, and the final score was 5–1. He went 5–1 with a 1.37 ERA during his sophomore season, striking out 58 batters in 85 1/3 innings, and was named an All-Region XIV first team selection.

Hammer left Navarro to join the Marshall Thundering Herd for the 2015 NCAA baseball season. He made his first start for the new team on February 27, striking out six batters and allowing six hits in seven innings, while Michael Taylor picked up the win in Marshall's 2–1 victory over the Towson Tigers. He picked up his first win on April 18, striking out two and allowing one run on five hits in 7 1/3 innings of the Herd's 5–1 win over Old Dominion. Hammer's next win came on May 9, when he set personal highs with 11 strikeouts in eight innings, allowing six hits and three walks as the Herd defeated the Western Kentucky Hilltoppers 5–3. Hammer finished the 2015 season with a 2–6 record, 3.83 ERA, and one save in 15 appearances, 12 of which were starts, and he struck out 56 batters in a team-leading 80 innings.

Hammer picked up his first win of the 2016 college baseball season on March 6, when he struck out nine batters and allowed three earned runs in six innings of a 12–6 victory over Lehigh. The next week, he pitched a 7–2 complete game victory over Brown, carrying a no-hitter through four innings before surrendering a double in the fifth. Hammer missed nine games with an upper body injury but finished the season 4–2 with a 4.88 ERA in 14 appearances, 11 of which were starts, and with 56 strikeouts in 66 1/3 innings. Hammer appeared as a relief pitcher for Marshall in the semifinal round of the Conference USA baseball tournament, and despite holding the Southern Miss Golden Eagles scoreless in his outing, Marshall fell 3–2 and was eliminated from the postseason.

== Professional career ==
=== Colorado Rockies (2016–2017) ===
The Colorado Rockies of Major League Baseball (MLB), Hammer's hometown team, selected him in the 24th round, 710th overall, of the 2016 MLB draft. He signed with the team for a bonus of only $1,000 and was assigned to the Rookie-level Grand Junction Rockies of the Pioneer League. The Grand Junction Rockies were managed at the time by Frank Gonzales, who had coached Hammer when he was in high school. Hammer made 27 Pioneer League appearances, all in relief, in his first season of professional baseball. He posted a 0–2 record and a 3.92 ERA while striking out 52 batters in 43 2/3 innings.

Hammer opened the 2017 baseball season as the designated closer for the Single–A Asheville Tourists. After going 3–1 with a 1.08 ERA, 40 strikeouts, and six saves in his first 25 innings, he became one of six Tourists named to the South Atlantic League Mid-Season All-Star Team that June. He pitched five more innings, earning another win and striking out two more batters, before being called up to the High–A Lancaster JetHawks. In 12 games there, Hammer went 0–1 with a 5.25 ERA, striking out 18 batters in 12 innings and converting six saves. Between the two teams, Hammer successfully converted 13 saves in 14 opportunities and averaged 13.9 strikeouts per nine innings (K/9).

=== Philadelphia Phillies (2017–2021) ===
On July 26, 2017, the Philadelphia Phillies traded sidearm reliever Pat Neshek and cash to the Rockies in exchange for three prospects: Hammer, Alejandro Requena, and Jose Gomez. Hammer was assigned to the High–A Clearwater Threshers of the Florida State League (FSL), becoming a bullpen staple with a 2–0 record and a 0.57 ERA in 12 appearances. Hammer struck out 20 batters in 15 2/3 FSL innings, issued only two walks, and held his opponents to a .154 batting average. Impressed with his regular season performance, the Phillies sent Hammer to the Arizona Fall League to continue working on his pitch mechanics as a member of the Glendale Desert Dogs. In 10 appearances for Arizona, Hammer posted an ERA of 0.66, with 11 strikeouts in 13 2/3 innings and only 0.805 walks plus hits per innings pitched (WHIP).

After starting the 2018 baseball season in extended spring training with the Phillies, Hammer reported back to Clearwater in June. He appeared in only three games, allowing three earned runs in 3 2/3 innings before going on the disabled list (DL). He spent most of the season on the DL with a strained elbow, appearing in only 12 games. Nine of those appearances were in relief for the Threshers, with whom he went 1–2 with a 2.79 ERA and struck out 12 batters in 9 2/3 innings. The other three were quick outings with the Gulf Coast League Phillies. Although he was not invited to spring training in 2019, Hammer did receive a promotion, starting the season with the Double-A Reading Fightin' Phils. In 13 games and 21 innings there, Hammer went 1–0 with a 1.77 ERA. He made one appearance for the Triple-A Lehigh Valley IronPigs as well, recording outs against all six batters he faced.

When Pat Neshek was placed on the injured list on May 25, 2019, Hammer was called up to fill his place in the bullpen and on the 25-man roster. He made his MLB debut the following day, pitching a scoreless inning against the Milwaukee Brewers by getting out Christian Yelich, Ryan Braun, and Mike Moustakas. Hammer played 20 games with the Phillies, during which he went 1–0 with a 3.79 ERA and 1.421 WHIP while striking out 13 batters in 19 innings. He was sent back down to the IronPigs on July 23, however, to prevent him from being overworked following his injury-shortened 2018 season. Upon his return, Hammer's fastball velocity sharply declined with the rigors of a full season of professional baseball, and in his last 16 outings, he recorded a 14.49 ERA, .345 batting average against, and opposing batters had a 1.128 on-base plus slugging against him. Coupled with his earlier appearance, Hammer went 2–2 with a 12.64 ERA in 17 games for Lehigh Valley, striking out 16 batters in 15 2/3 innings.

Recognizing that his declining pitch velocity and the lack of breaking balls in his pitch repertoire had affected his performance, Hammer spent the 2019–20 offseason weightlifting and developing his slider and curveball. He was sent to Triple-A that February, but on June 30, Minor League Baseball responded to the COVID-19 pandemic by cancelling the season. Every team was afforded a 60-player pool, of which 30 were on the major league roster and the other 30 practiced an at alternate training site instead of playing in minor league games. Hammer was included in the alternate training site player pool, and he spent the entirety of the abbreviated season training in Lehigh Valley. Hammer opened the 2021 season with the IronPigs, posting a 1.74 ERA and striking out 33 batters in 20 2/3 innings before he was called up to Philadelphia on July 10. He made his season debut that day against the Boston Red Sox, loading the bases on a hit by pitch, a single and a walk before retiring the next three batters to escape the inning without allowing a run. Hammer appeared in 20 major league games during the 2021 season, recording a 4.95 ERA and striking out 22 batters in 20 innings. On November 5, 2021, the Phillies attempted to outright Hammer off of the 40-man roster, but he opted for free agency instead.

=== Second stint with Rockies (2022) ===
On December 1, 2021, Hammer signed a minor league contract with the Rockies to rejoin the team that drafted him. Following the 2021–22 MLB lockout, Hammer was one of ten non-roster players that the Rockies invited to a condensed spring training. He was assigned to the Albuquerque Isotopes, the Triple-A affiliate of the Rockies, to begin the season. The assignment reunited Hammer with his high school baseball coach Frank Gonzales, who had since taken a job as pitching coach for the Isotopes. He spent the entire season in Albuquerque. In 53 appearances for the Isotopes, all of which came in relief, Hammer was 1–1 with a 5.94 ERA. He struck out 47 batters in 47 innings. He elected free agency on November 10, 2022.

=== Lake Erie Crushers (2023) ===
Hammer joined the Lake Erie Crushers of the Frontier League, an independent baseball league, for the 2023 season. He made his Frontier League debut in the Crushers' season opener, pitching a scoreless inning in relief against the Québec Capitales on May 12. The Crushers also deployed Hammer as a starting pitcher, and he picked up his first win on June 21, pitching five innings in a shutout of the Schaumburg Boomers. In 19 appearances for Lake Erie, including nine starts, Hammer was 3–3 with a 3.46 ERA, striking out 46 batters in 52 innings.

=== Los Angeles Angels (2023) ===
On July 29, 2023, Hammer signed with the Los Angeles Angels organization, becoming the first Crushers pitcher this season to sign with an MLB franchise. He made his debut with the Triple-A Salt Lake Bees on August 3 as a starter, allowing one run in five innings against the El Paso Chihuahuas. He made nine appearances with the Bees, all but one as a starter. During that Time, Hammer went 1–2 with a 6.63 ERA, striking out 19 batters in 38 innings. He elected free agency at the end of the season.

=== Generales de Durango (2024) ===
On December 25, 2023, Hammer signed with the Generales de Durango of the Mexican League, where he was expected to join their bullpen. Two months later, the Mexican League would suspend the Generales for the 2024 season. Hammer was officially released by the Caliente de Durango without appearing in a game on September 21.

== Pitching style ==
During the 2021 season, Hammer threw three pitches: a fastball with an average velocity of 94 mph (151 km/h), which he threw 61 percent of the time, and an 83 mph (134 km/h) slider and 76 mph (122 km/h) curveball as his breaking balls. He added the slider early in the 2019 season, before his first MLB recall, and has also used a changeup. Hammer credits his minor-league elbow injury with teaching him "that I need to take better care of my body and how to prepare and not just go out there and throw".

== Personal life ==
Hammer is known for the thick black plastic glasses that he wears when pitching, which have been compared to the glasses that Charlie Sheen's character Ricky "Wild Thing" Vaughn wears in the 1989 baseball film Major League. He began wearing them during the 2017 season after his poor vision prevented him from reading the signs indicating which pitches his catcher was calling for him to throw.

As his parents' firstborn, Hammer was named John Dale after both of his grandfathers, but primarily goes by his initials because his parents thought that "J. D. Hammer" was a "[b]aseball name". He has two younger brothers, Garrett and Kalen, and a sister named Brenli. Garrett Hammer played baseball for Rocky Mountain High School, Kellogg Community College, and New Mexico Highlands University.
