= Poudre High School =

Location
- 201 South Impala Drive; Fort Collins, Colorado; United States; 40°35′10.9″N 105°7′16.9″W

Information
- Type: Public high school
- Motto: I am who I am because of who we are (Ubuntu philosophy)
- Established: 1963 (63 years ago)
- School district: Poudre School District
- Principal: Kathy Mackay
- Teaching staff: 91.98 (FTE)
- Grades: 9–12
- Enrollment: 1,572 (2023–2024)
- Student to teacher ratio: 17.09
- Colors: Royal blue and silver
- Athletics: Baseball, basketball, cross country, football, golf, soccer, softball, swimming, tennis, track, volleyball, wrestling, cheer-leading, dance team, FFA, rodeo team
- Mascot: Impala
- Website: Official site

Poudre High School is a public senior high school in Fort Collins, Colorado, United States. It is part of the Poudre School District. The school serves approximately 1,900 students with the most northwestern part of Fort Collins and outlying communities as its boundary.

== History ==
=== Building ===
Construction of Poudre High School was planned to reduce serious overcrowding at Fort Collins High School. The cornerstone of PHS was laid June 1, 1963 by the Grand Lodge Colorado, A.F. and A.M. The original building was 142,000 square feet, had 43 teaching stations, and housed 1,150 students from Fort Collins, Waverly, Wellington and LaPorte. Over the years the building increased in size to 170,000 square feet after several additions.

In 1993, provisions were made for a major remodeling of Poudre High School and Rocky Mountain High School, as well as the rebuilding of Fort Collins High School. Construction on PHS was completed in 1995 at a total cost of $14.1 million. The building is now 275,000 square feet, with 157,000 square feet remodeled. The new construction strives to provide daylight to as many interior spaces as possible; a centrally located outdoor environmental learning center brings natural light to the heart of the building. Additional new features include 10 science labs, a media center, 14,000 square foot gymnasium, and an additional 100-seat auditorium.

Nine modular buildings are used as classroom space in addition to the main building. Growth in communities surrounding Fort Collins has pushed the school to capacity, reaching more than 90% capacity as of April 2015. A $375 bond has been proposed to build three new schools by 2020, which would help crowding at PHS and expand school choice for prospective students.

=== Mascot ===
The first principal, Reid Pope, allowed the student body to pick the mascot. The students got the idea of the impala from a National Geographic article, becoming the only high school in the United States to have an impala mascot. Dr. Robert Parke donated an impala taxidermy to the school after a safari in Africa. The impala is currently encased in the school's entrance.

=== Artworks ===
Mural

In the 1970s, four students created a mural along the 100 hallway, in the lower level of the building, that symbolizes a student's journey through high school, focusing on the Beatles' musical transition as its theme, highlighting the progression toward increased individuality in both cases. One former principal censored a part of the mural, depicting a seven-foot tall woman smoking a two-foot long cigarette.

River Wall sculpture

To celebrate the school's 30th anniversary and near-completion of the new building, the class of 1994 gave a class gift of the "River Wall" sculpture. The artwork consists of 22 bronze plaques by four alumni artists: Bruce Gueswel, class of 1980; Barbara (Lillyblade) Breen, class of 1969; Christine (Lillyblade) Martell, class of 1967; and Jerry Hubka, class of 1966. Above the plaques reads the quote "Eventually, all things merge into one, and a river runs through it." by Norman Maclean, from his semi-autobiographical novel A River Runs Through It and Other Stories. The sculpture is visible through the entrance along the curved wall of the new Media Center.

Racing the Wind Bronze Sculpture

In September 2002 the 1.5 X life size Bronze Sculpture of a running and leaping male and female Impala were installed near the main entrance to Poudre High School. The Sculpture was commissioned by Jerry Hubka (PHS Class of 1966) and PHS Art Department Teacher and Chairman for 29 years. The sculpture was purchased by a group of Poudre High School Alumni. The sculptor, Gary Hale from Tulsa, Oklahoma created the work and it was transported to Loveland Colorado and Cast in Bronze at Art Castings of Colorado.

== Academics ==
PHS offers continuation of the International Baccalaureate (IB) Middle Years Program for grades 9–10 and Diploma Program for college-bound students in grades 11–12, offering the Middle Years Program since 2002 and the Diploma Program since 1995. It is one of around 20 high schools in the state that offer the program. The school also offers several Advanced Placement (AP) courses and exams.

Poudre was ranked yearly as one of the top high schools in the nation by Newsweek from 2003 to 2013. The scoring during this period was based on the Challenge Index, which is the number total number of AP and IB tests taken in the previous year divided by the number of graduating seniors. The scoring system was changed in 2014 to reflect several other factors and relied on public, rather than self-reported, data.

In 2016, three Poudre High School students earned a perfect ACT score, and 10 were named National Merit Semifinalists, the most of any other high school in the district for both categories.

== Academic competitions ==
=== Alpine Robotics ===
In the 2002 FIRST Robotics Competition season, Poudre High School competed under the moniker "Alpine Robotics" as Team 159 at the Seattle regional competition. They won the coveted Chairman's Award, which is given to the team that shows outstanding local participation and team spirit. Alpine Robotics has since successfully gone to the FIRST Championship almost every year. In the 2010 FIRST Robotics competition, Breakaway, Team 159 earned the Outstanding Robot Design award. In recent events team 159 was a 2018 finalist in the Utah regional, also semifinalists in Colorado. As well as receiving the Woodie Flowers award for their mentor Mr. Baldo.

Awards

- 2001 – Best Design Award at San Jose Regional
- 2002 – Chairmans award at Seattle Regional, Fourth in division at Nationals
- 2004 – Regional Engineering Inspiration Award (Colorado Regional), Picked for Regional Finals (Colorado Regional)
- 2005 – Regional Finalist (Colorado Regional), Delphi Driving Tomorrow's Technology (Colorado Regional), Daimler-Chrysler Team Spirit (Colorado Regional)
- 2006 – Regional Chairman's Award (Colorado Regional), Radioshack Innovation In Control (Colorado Regional)
- 2007 – Regional Chairman's Award (Colorado Regional), Best Website Award (Colorado Regional)
- 2008 – Regional Chairman's Award (Colorado Regional)
- 2010 – Outstanding Robot Design Award (Colorado Regional)
- 2018 – Regional Finalist (Utah Regional), Woodie Flowers Award (Colorado Regional)

=== National Science Bowl ===
Poudre High School regularly competes in the National Science Bowl regionally in the Rocky Mountain Science Bowl Region. In 2003, Poudre was the first high school nationally to compete in the National Ocean Sciences Bowl, National Science Bowl, and National Science Olympiad. In 2004 Poudre became the first school in the nation to place in the top ten in all three nationals, finishing third in National Ocean Sciences Bowl, seventh in National Science Olympiad, and ninth in National Science Bowl. In 2007, Poudre High School's Science Bowl took first place in the nation, winning a trip to Sydney, Australia to attend the Professor Harry Messel International Science School.

Awards

- Nationals
  - 1st place – 2007
  - 5th place – 2010
  - 9th place (tie) – 2004
  - 10th place (tie) – 2006
- Regionals
  - 1st place – 2008 (but unable to attend nationals due to a conflict with IB testing)
  - 1st and 5th places – 2006
  - 2nd place – 2009
  - 2nd and 5th places – 2005
  - 3rd place – 2014

=== National Ocean Sciences Bowl ===
In the National Ocean Sciences Bowl competition of 2006, the school took second place in competition with many schools from coastal states, besting its previous third-place finish in 2004. Poudre High School also competes in the Trout Bowl Regional Competition.

Awards

- Nationals
  - 2nd place – 2006
  - 3rd place – 2004
  - 9th place – 2013
  - 7th place – 2010
- Regionals
  - 1st place – 2008
  - 1st and 4th places – 2006
  - 1st and 3rd places – 2007
  - 2nd place – 2009
  - 2nd place – 2012

=== Science Olympiad ===
The Science Olympiad team has placed at the national level. They conduct research and participate in self-study programs in order to prepare themselves for the competition.

Awards

- 4th place in nationals – 2008
- 5th place in nationals – 2002
- 6th place in nationals – 2003
- 7th place in nationals – 2004
- 9th place in nationals – 2007
- 12th place in nationals – 2006
- 12th place in nationals – 2005
- 12th place in nationals – 2009
- 12th place in nationals – 2010

== Athletics ==
=== Colorado state championships ===
- Football: 1969
- Softball: 1991
- Boys' cross country: 1968 and 1990
- Girls' cross country: 1993, 1994, and 1995
- Boys' soccer: 2004
- Girls' soccer: 1995 and 1996
- Girls' swimming: 1993

=== Other honors and achievements ===
Jacob Greenwood won four individual state titles in Boys Wrestling from 2015 to 2018.

In 1994 the girls' cross county team won the National AAU Championship. They placed 1–2–5–7 and 11th. for a score of 26 points. The Race was held in Hammond, Indiana.

In 2005, the cheerleading team finished third in the 5A co-ed division at CHSAA's annual cheerleading state competition held in Denver, Colorado. The team later finished third at a national competition in Las Vegas, Nevada. The team also placed in the top ten in later years at the CHSAA State competition, winning seventh place in 2006 and ninth place in 2007.

In 2012, Poudre went to the state championship basketball game and lost a close game after beating reigning champion team #1 Regis Jesuit in the semi-finals.

Poudre High School also hosts a robust unified sports program, with teams made up of athletes with and without disabilities. Along with flag football, the school has a unified basketball team, which regularly draws as many or more fans than typical basketball games.

== Food truck ==
Students enrolled in catering classes at Poudre High School, along with catering teacher Cathy Toplyn and approval from the principal, successfully raised $35,000 through crowd funding to launch a food truck operation in 2015. The project ties in with an option for concurrent enrollment in culinary classes at Front Range Community College, and Toplyn views the food truck project as a pathway for students interested in a career in the culinary arts to learn business and entrepreneurship skills. After securing health department approval along with the necessary city and state retail licenses, Toplyn planned to have the truck serve at school athletic events, but, beginning in the summer of 2016, it will also function as a Kids Cafe (a program of the Food Bank for Larimer County), serving meals to low-income children ages 5–18.

== Literary arts magazine ==
Kaleidoscope is Poudre High School's award-winning literary arts magazine, publishing student work. It is available as a class during second semester during 8th period.

Awards

- American Scholastic Press Association (ASPA)
  - First Place with Special Merit – 1999, 2001–2005, 2006, 2009, 2010, 2011, 2012, 2014
  - First Place – 1998, 2000, 2013, 2015
  - Second Place – 1997
  - Most Outstanding High School Literary Art Magazine – 2003, 2007, 2012, 2014
  - Outstanding Art – 1998, 1999, 2004, 2014
- National Council of Teachers of English (NCTE)
  - Highest Award – 1998, 1999, 2000
  - Superior Award – 1996, 2001, 2002, 2003, 2004, 2005
  - Excellent Award – 1997

== Music department ==
- The choir, band, and orchestra have played at Carnegie Hall.
- Poudre's Jazz I ensemble attended the 2013 New York City Jazz festival. The group played in the Allen Room at Jazz at Lincoln Center. Jazz I has also attended Crescent City Jazz Festival in New Orleans and played at Preservation Hall.
- Poudre's Impalaphonics choir ensemble performed in New York at Carnegie Hall with Manhattan Concert Productions in March 2014.

== Theatre ==
Poudre's theatre program is recognized on the world level. Poudre was invited to attend the "Fringe" festival in Edinburgh, Scotland in the summer of 2006. However, due to lack of funding, the theatre students were unable to participate in the event.

The Thespians also run an improvisation troupe, Playwrighting Club and the "Theatre in the Classroom Program". The program continues to produce some of the highest quality plays and musicals in Colorado. Musical productions have included Fiddler on the Roof (1994), Anything Goes (1998), Annie Get Your Gun (1999), Carousel and Pippin (2000), Guys and Dolls (2002 and 1996), Crazy for You (2003), Damn Yankees (2004), 42nd Street (2005), Oklahoma! (2006 and 1995), Once Upon a Mattress (2007), Seussical (2008), and Matilda (2022). Recent plays have spanned several genres: the French story of Cyrano de Bergerac (2004), Aristophanes' Ancient Greek comedy The Birds (2005), the American classic Our Town (2006), Bertolt Brecht's The Caucasian Chalk Circle (2007), the melodrama Under the Gaslight (2008).

In the summer of 2006, PHS housed an innovative new program called "Shakespeare in the Summer". This was a summer intensive open to all Poudre School District students from grades 7–12 in which students studied and produced a Shakespearean piece under the guidance of a guest director.

== Notable alumni ==
- Serena M. Auñón, astronaut
- Erin Macdonald, astrophysicist and science consultant for the Star Trek franchise
- Christopher Mykles, known professionally as MonteCristo, League of Legends commentator and team owner
- Deric Yaussi, professional football kicker
- Sarah Adina Smith, film director
- Jennifer Arndt, mayor of Fort Collins
