= Pat Neshek =

American baseball player (born 1980)

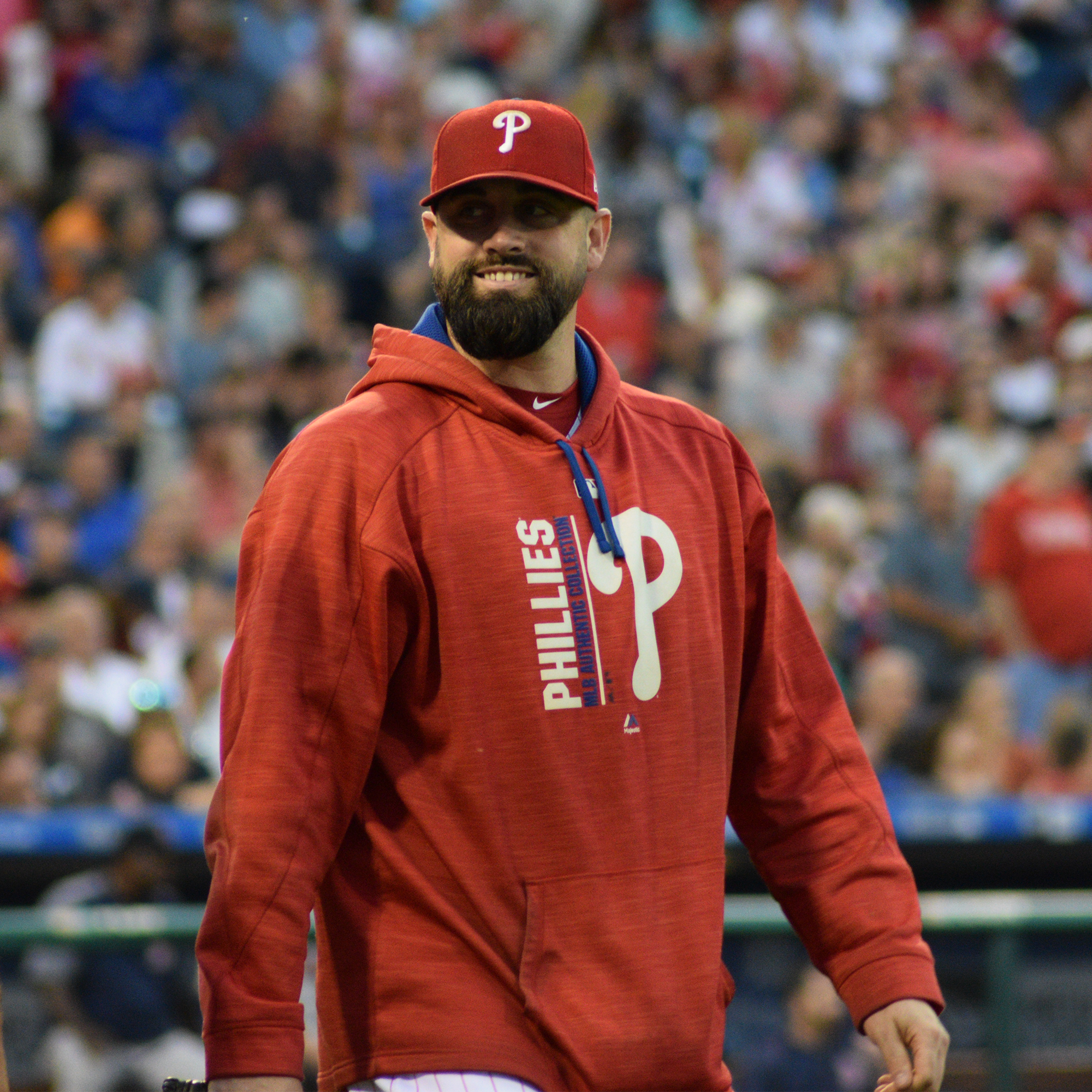
- Neshek with the Philadelphia Phillies in 2017
- Pitcher
- Born: September 4, 1980 (age 45); Madison, Wisconsin, U.S.
- Batted: Switch Threw: Right

MLB debut
- July 7, 2006, for the Minnesota Twins

Last MLB appearance
- June 19, 2019, for the Philadelphia Phillies

MLB statistics
- Win–loss record: 36–25
- Earned run average: 2.82
- Strikeouts: 471
- Stats at Baseball Reference

Teams
- Minnesota Twins (2006–2008, 2010); San Diego Padres (2011); Oakland Athletics (2012–2013); St. Louis Cardinals (2014); Houston Astros (2015–2016); Philadelphia Phillies (2017); Colorado Rockies (2017); Philadelphia Phillies (2018–2019)

Career highlights and awards
- 2× All-Star (2014, 2017)
Medals
Men's baseball
Representing United States
World Baseball Classic
Gold medal – first place	2017 Los Angeles	Team

Patrick John Neshek (pronounced NEE-shehk; born September 4, 1980) is an American former professional baseball pitcher. He played in Major League Baseball (MLB) for the Minnesota Twins, San Diego Padres, Oakland Athletics, St. Louis Cardinals, Houston Astros, Colorado Rockies and Philadelphia Phillies. The Twins selected him in the sixth round of the 2002 MLB draft, out of Butler University. Neshek made his MLB debut for the Twins in 2006, and played for them until 2010 (except for 2009, which he missed due to Tommy John surgery). He was selected to his first All-Star Game in 2014, and his second in 2017.

Probably best known for an unorthodox pitching delivery, Neshek's arm motion slots about sidearm, with an explosive release point, which developed after a baseball struck his forearm in high school. Right-handed batters have difficulty tracking the path of his pitches, resulting in a .193 batting average, .243 on-base percentage, and a .311 slugging percentage against Neshek, in 1,143 career plate appearances, through 2019.

== Early career ==
Neshek was born in Madison, Wisconsin. At Park Center Senior High School in Brooklyn Park, Minnesota, a suburb of Minneapolis, he was named to the All-State team.

At Butler University, located in Indianapolis, he was a finance major and a three-year letter winner. In 2000, he played summer league baseball for the Wisconsin Woodchucks of the Northwoods League. In 2001, he played with the Wareham Gatemen of the Cape Cod Baseball League (CCBL), and was inducted into the CCBL Hall of Fame in 2024. In his junior year, his win–loss record was 4–6 but he posted a 3.08 earned run average (ERA) and 94 strikeouts (SO) in 87 2/3 innings pitched (IP). He holds school strikeout records for a single game (18 vs. Detroit, April 15, 2001), single season (118, 2001), and career (280). He ultimately became the third Butler pitcher to make the major leagues, after Oral Hildebrand and Doug Jones. In 2018, Neshek was inducted into the Butler Athletics Hall of Fame.

The Minnesota Twins originally selected Neshek in the 45th round (1,337th overall) of the 1999 MLB draft, but he did not sign and went on to Butler. The Twins again later drafted him in the sixth round (182nd overall) of the 2002 MLB draft. He signed with the Twins that year for a $132,500 signing bonus, and was assigned to the Twins' rookie farm team. He then spent four years in the minor leagues. During the 2005 season, he led all minor league Twins players in saves. In 2006, Neshek was 6–2 with 14 saves and a 1.95 ERA in 33 relief appearances for the Triple-A Rochester Red Wings. He was International League Pitcher of the Week on July 2, mid-season All Star, post-season All Star, Baseball America Triple-A All Star, and MiLB.com Triple-A Relief Pitcher of the Year. He has pitched 411 1/3 innings in 302 career minor league games with 464 strikeouts, a 31–19 record and a 2.58 ERA.

== Major League career ==
=== Minnesota Twins ===
Neshek made his MLB debut on July 7, 2006, pitched two innings and allowed just one hit. On July 30, he earned his first major league career win against the Detroit Tigers after pitching one-third of an inning. Neshek appeared in 32 games in his rookie year, accumulating 37 innings pitched, a 4–2 record, six home runs allowed, but just 23 hits and 53 strikeouts with a 2.19 ERA. Those rates were 5.6 hits per nine innings allowed (H/9) and 12.5 strikeouts per 9 innings pitched (K/9).

Neshek began the 2007 season 2–0 with a 2.25 ERA in 12 relief appearances. In May, he gave up only six hits in 13 2/3 innings pitched, had 18 strikeouts and posted a very impressive 0.66 ERA. He was chosen as one of five candidates for the final online fan vote for the All-Star game along with Jeremy Bonderman, Kelvim Escobar, Roy Halladay, and Hideki Okajima. The spot went to Okajima despite a campaign by Twin fans and national sports blogs to "Pitch in for Pat." Neshek finished third in the voting.

Neshek suffered his first loss of the season against the New York Yankees on July 5, but then won three games in 14 days improving his record to 6–1. He posted a 3.97 ERA during the month of July, and regressed to a 5.06 ERA in August. On September 20, the Twins shut him down for the season because of shoulder/elbow fatigue. Neshek ended the season at 7–2, appearing in 74 games (fifth in the American League) with 74 strikeouts and pitching a total of 70 1/3 innings with a 2.94 ERA. He received the 2007 Dick Siebert Award, given by the Twins to the best MLB player from the upper midwest.

In his first three appearances of 2008, Neshek allowed only one hit in 3 1/3 innings pitched with no earned runs, but then allowed seven earned runs in his next 10 innings. In May, after pitching in only 13 1/3 innings, he was placed on the 60-day disabled list with a tear of the ulnar collateral ligament (UCL) and missed the rest of the season. On November 11, it was announced that he would undergo ligament replacement surgery (more commonly known as Tommy John surgery) and miss the entire 2009 season. He underwent surgery one week later on November 18.

Neshek recovered to make the Twins' 2010 roster out of spring training. In 4 1/3 innings pitched in April, he had a 4.15 ERA with two runs and two hits allowed. On April 15, he was put on the disabled list due to middle finger inflammation. But when he was re-examined, an MRI revealed that the injury was not in fact in the middle finger but rather in the palm of his right hand. He angrily wrote about this not only on his website but also on Facebook, where he said he was "not happy with anything that has gone on, especially when it could have been taken care of three weeks ago and I was told the wrong info." This raised Twins manager Ron Gardenhire's ire, in that his young pitcher had publicly criticized the Twins' organization and their medical staff, but the matter was eventually settled, Neshek saying "Gardy and I are on the same page" and vowing that once healthy he would be willing to pitch wherever the Twins assign him, calling the whole thing "a miscommunication." After his time on the DL ran out, he was optioned to Triple-A Rochester, but he was later recalled to the majors on September 6. Neshek finished the season 0–1 with a 5.00 ERA in 11 games, recording nine strikeouts and eight walks in nine innings pitched.

=== San Diego Padres ===
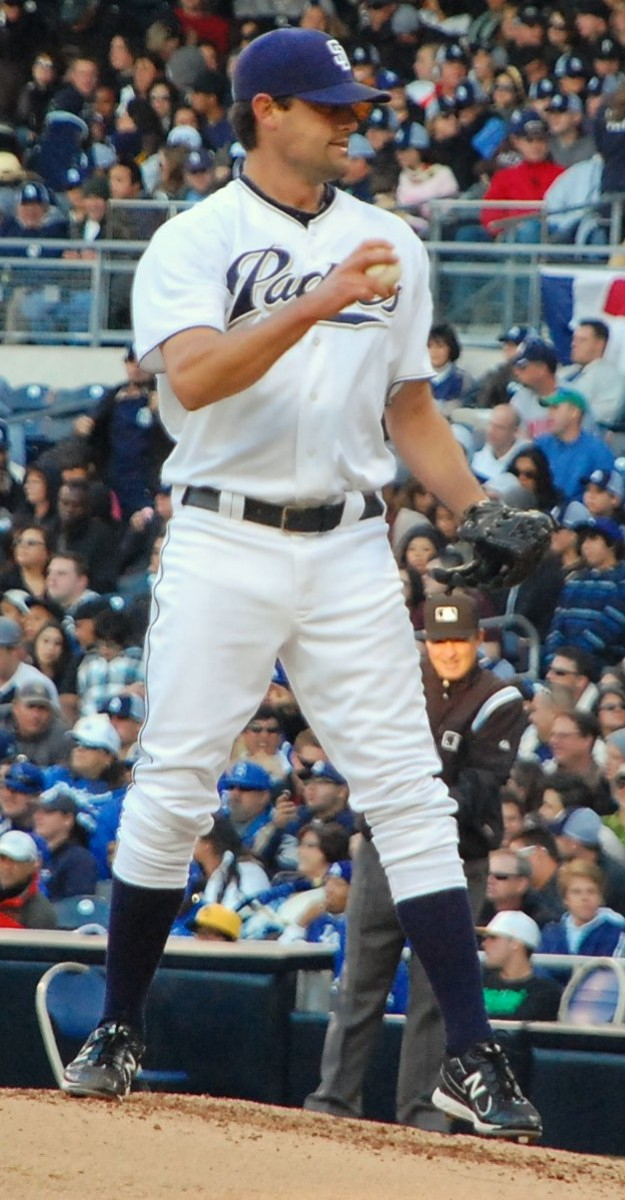
Neshek pitching for San Diego Padres in 2011

On March 20, 2011, Neshek was claimed off waivers by the San Diego Padres. He was designated for assignment on August 20 after going 1–1 and recording a 4.01 ERA with 20 strikeouts in 24 2/3 innings over in 25 appearances for the Padres. He was designated for assignment again on September 1. He cleared waivers and was sent outright to Triple-A on September 6. At season's end, he became a free agent.

=== Baltimore Orioles ===
On January 30, 2012, Neshek signed a minor league contract with the Baltimore Orioles and was invited to spring training. He ultimately did not make the opening day roster and spent the next several months at Triple-A Norfolk Tides. For the week of June 25 – July 1, he was named the International League's Pitcher of the Week. He notched three saves and eight strikeouts in 4 1/3 innings pitched, and had not surrendered a hit since May 29. In his time at Norfolk, Neshek was 3–2 with 11 saves and a 2.66 ERA in 35 relief appearances. He recorded 49 strikeouts while walking just seven and giving up only one home run in 44 innings pitched.

=== Oakland Athletics ===
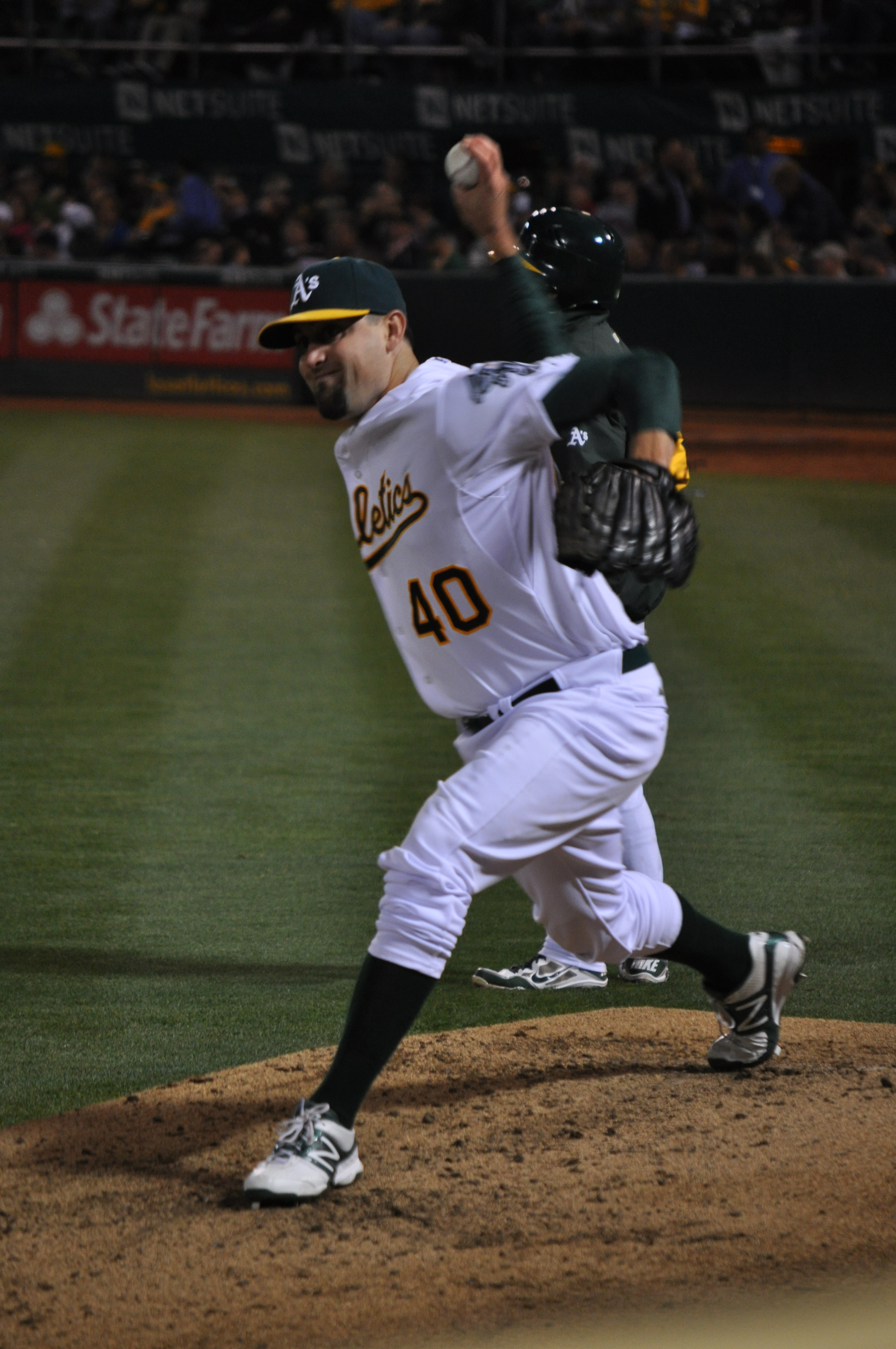
Neshek warming up for the A's.

On August 3, 2012, Neshek was traded to the Oakland Athletics in exchange for cash considerations.

On September 22, Neshek gave up the game-tying home run in the bottom of the 13th inning to New York Yankees slugger Raúl Ibañez. The A's had scored four runs in the top of the inning, leading to a galling 10–9 loss the next inning. However, the A's defeated the Yankees the next day and went 9–2 to end the season, edging the Texas Rangers out of the American League West championship by one game, including sweeping the final three-game series in Oakland. In 24 games with the A's, Neshek went 2–1 in 19 2/3 innings, yielding 10 hits and six walks, along with 16 strikeouts and a 1.37 ERA. He relied heavily on the slider, throwing it 83.5 percent of all pitches.

On November 30, 2012, Neshek avoided arbitration by agreeing to a one-year, $975,000 deal with the A's. He started the season well, posted a 2.34 ERA in his first 38 appearances into August, with 30 of them being scoreless. However, he gave up three runs apiece in two different appearances in August, raising his ERA to 3.58. Neshek attributed his early success to throwing almost exclusively sliders to right-handed hitters. Of all his pitches, he threw the slider 73 percent of the time in 2013.

The A's designated Neshek for assignment on August 26. He cleared waivers and was sent outright to Triple-A on August 28. He had his contract selected to the major league roster again on September 3. For the season, he finished 2–1 with a 3.35 ERA and 29 strikeouts in 45 relief appearances. He elected free agency November 5. Through the end of 2013, Neshek had faced 555 right-handed batters in his MLB career, holding them to a .181 batting average, .257 on-base percentage (OBP), and .315 slugging percentage (SLG). In 326 plate appearances, opposite-handed hitters had more success with a .237 average, .328 OBP, and .432 SLG.

=== St. Louis Cardinals ===
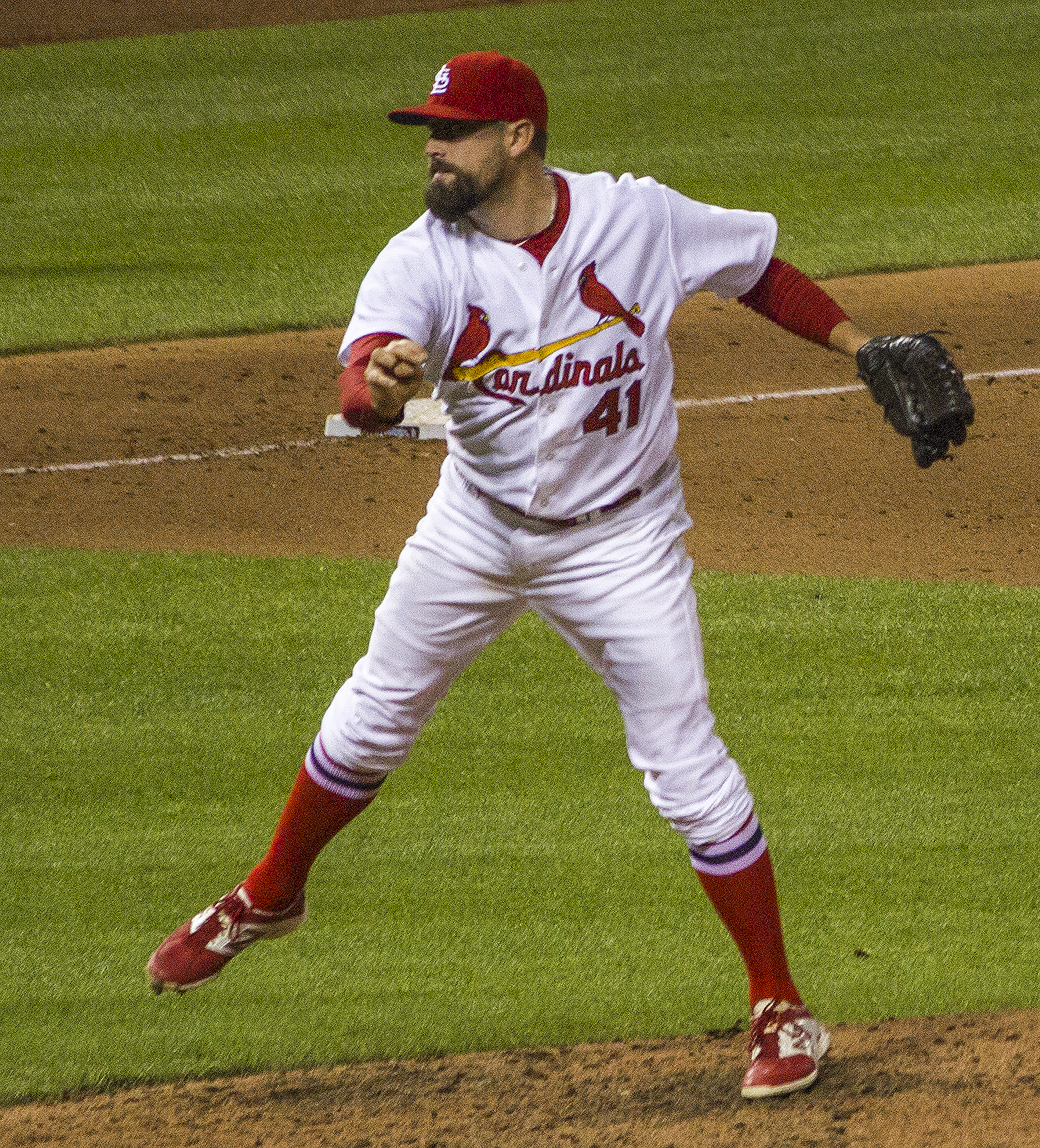
Neshek pitching for St.Louis.

Neshek signed a minor league deal with the St. Louis Cardinals on February 6, 2014, with an invitation to spring training and an opportunity as a right-handed specialist against right-handed batters from the bullpen. After the mixed performances of the previous two seasons and less-than-satisfying offers from other teams, he had worked during the offseason specifically to target an increase in fastball velocity. This followed after the New York Mets commented to him they wanted to see increased velocity. It gradually surged, showing up to 92 miles per hour (148 km/h), up from a consistent 87–88 miles per hour (140–142 km/h) from the year before. Pleased with the increased velocity, the Cardinals purchased his contract on March 30, thereby awarding him a spot on the 25-man MLB roster.

The developments with Neshek's spring training led to further success in the regular season that occurred as he began to mix more pitches with his slider. Against 48 total batters faced in April, he struck out 16 and yielded just six hits along with a 1.42 ERA. Neshek was credited with his first win as a Cardinal when he pitched two scoreless innings against the Arizona Diamondbacks on May 22. Neshek improved in his second month as a Cardinal, allowing just five hits and yielding no runs in 12 innings pitched in May. He picked up his first career MLB save on June 4 against the Kansas City Royals. In another eight innings pitched in June, Neshek allowed just one run with a .143 batting average against. During a 22-game span, he yielded no runs, covering 20 1/3 innings. His fastball average for the season through June 30 was 90.1 miles per hour (145.0 km/h), the highest of his career. Through that point, sliders comprised 38 percent of his total pitches.

After emerging from the role of a right-handed specialist to primary setup pitcher for closer Trevor Rosenthal, Neshek made his first All-Star Game. In 43 games and 38 1/3 IP before the midseason break, he was 4–0 with two saves, a 0.70 ERA, and 0.57 walks plus hits per inning pitched (WHIP). By making the team, he became just the 15th non-starter or closer of 280 total pitchers of the prior ten seasons to be named to an All-Star team. Further, the All-Star selection was a personal landmark event in two ways. First, the game was played at Target Field in Minneapolis, the home field of the Twins, the team with whom Neshek began his MLB career. Second, it was close to Brooklyn Park, the city in which he grew up. However, Neshek took the loss for the National League, as the American League won, 5–3.

The Cardinals traded for John Lackey at the non-waiver deadline on July 31, and Neshek volunteered to change his number from 41 to 37. Lackey had worn 41 with past teams. To facilitate the exchange, Lackey mailed Neshek a Babe Ruth-autographed baseball the next month. In an August 10 appearance against the Orioles, Neshek's sinker was clocked at 93 miles per hour (150 km/h) as he completed two innings and struck out four, tying a career high. On August 19 against the Cincinnati Reds, he worked the last inning and picked up the decision in a Cardinals' walk-off win. It was his sixth win of the year against zero losses. For the month, he registered two saves and two wins. In 2014, Neshek was 7–2 with six saves and a 1.87 ERA in 71 appearances, recording 68 strikeouts in 67 1/3 innings. Despite having only given up four home runs the entire season, Neshek surrendered a postseason game-losing home run in Game 2 of the 2014 National League Division Series to Matt Kemp of the Los Angeles Dodgers and the game-tying home run in Game 5 of the 2014 National League Championship Series to Michael Morse of the San Francisco Giants, which ultimately led to the elimination of the Cardinals in the 2014 postseason. He became a free agent following the season.

=== Houston Astros ===
On December 10, 2014, Neshek agreed to a two-year, $12.5 million contract with the Houston Astros with a team option of at least $6 million for 2017. The deal was made official on December 12. On June 7, Neshek walked Justin Smoak of the Toronto Blue Jays, ending 24 consecutive appearances without a walk, the second-longest streak to open a season in major league history. (Note: The longest was 30, accomplished by Mark Eichhorn while with the 1991 California Angels.) In 2015, Neshek was 3–6 with one save, 28 holds (tied for third in the AL), 3.62 ERA, and 51 strikeouts in 66 relief appearances. In 2016, he had similar results, with a 2–2 record with a 3.06 ERA, and 43 strikeouts in 60 relief appearances.

=== Philadelphia Phillies ===
Neshek was traded to the Philadelphia Phillies for a player to be named later on November 4, 2016. He was an NL All Star, his second and final All-Star Game appearance. In the first four months of the 2017 season with the Phillies, he was 3–2 with one save, a 1.12 ERA, and 45 strikeouts in 43 relief appearances.

=== Colorado Rockies ===
Neshek was traded to the Colorado Rockies for minor league players Jose Gomez, JD Hammer, and Alejandro Requena on July 26, 2017. With the Rockies, he was 2–1 with a 2.45 ERA, and 24 strikeouts in 28 appearances. In the Rockies' Wild Card game loss, he allowed 2 runs in 1 2/3 innings. His 23 holds between the two teams was tied for fifth in the NL. He became a free agent following the season.

=== Philadelphia Phillies (second stint) ===
On December 15, 2017, Neshek signed a two-year contract with the Phillies. Neshek announced that he would wear uniform number 93, which had never been worn by an MLB player during regular season play. On March 30, 2018, Neshek was placed on the 10-day disabled list with a right shoulder strain. On July 1, he was activated off the disabled list.

In 2018 with the Phillies, Neshek was 3–2 with five saves and a 2.59 ERA, and 15 strikeouts in 30 relief appearances. He was the eighth-oldest player in the National League.

In 2019 with the Phillies, Neshek pitched only 18 innings and was 0–1 with three saves and a 5.00 ERA in 20 games. His season ended due to a hamstring injury he suffered in June that ultimately required surgery in September. He was the eighth-oldest MLB player in his final season.

== International career ==
Neshek represented Team USA at the 2017 World Baseball Classic, posting a 0.00 ERA in 5 innings of work. Neshek pitched in both the semi-finals against Japan and the championship game win against Puerto Rico, helping lead Team USA to its first-ever WBC title.

== Pitching style ==
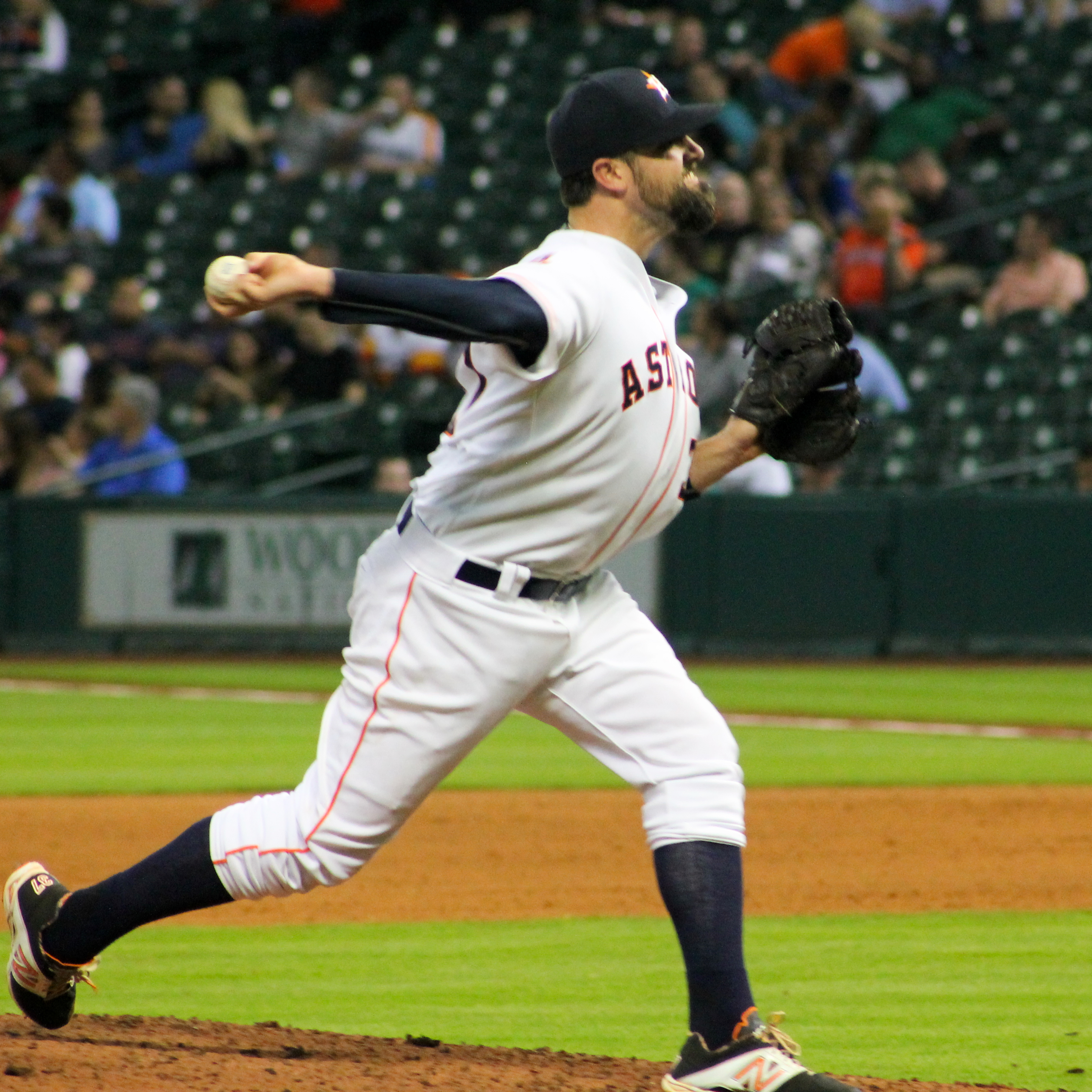
Neshek in 2015

Neshek had an unorthodox style of delivery that transitions from starting at a submarine angle to finishing sidearm with an explosive thrusting motion. Near the release of the pitch, his torso and arm angle in a moderate "V" shape. He developed the delivery after being struck in the forearm with a ball in high school by C. J. Woodrow, a former Philadelphia Phillies farmhand. He then began to throw sidearm and play shortstop due to his injury. When it healed, he could not change back to over the shoulder and his unique delivery stayed the way it is. He still has a lump in his forearm where he was struck.

Neshek's delivery earned mention on SportsCenter and Baseball Tonight. Professional baseball scouts had divided opinions on his style. Some worried that this violent-looking delivery would lead to arm problems. Others considered the delivery to be an asset, as right-handed batters have a very difficult time seeing the ball. For example, José Marzán, Neshek's former manager with the Single-A Fort Myers Miracle, believes that one of Neshek's greatest strengths was his ability to throw hard from such an angle, as his fastball used to top out around 96 mph (154 km/h) prior to his Tommy John surgery. Neshek had great success in the minor and major leagues as a reliever, striking out 24 percent of batters faced.

After joining the Cardinals in 2014, Neshek's sinking fastball exceeded expectations through May 21. It averaged more horizontal movement than any other pitch from any other reliever on the Cardinals staff (10.9 inches, which was 1.3 inches more than Carlos Martínez' two-seam fastball). Neshek's sinking fastball averaged over 91 miles per hour (146 km/h) during that time, its highest velocity since 2007.

== Personal life ==
Neshek is married to Stephanee Neshek. Their first son, Gehrig John, was born on October 2, 2012, the day the A's won the AL West division title. However, he lived only 23 hours. The cause of the infant's death has not been made public. The autopsy of the baby did not provide sufficient clarity about the cause of death, and there are lawsuits pending. Their second son, Hoyt Robert Neshek, was born on March 13, 2014. The Nesheks received a scare because Hoyt was born 11 days early with pneumonia and an air pocket outside his lungs. After remaining in intensive care for 10 days, he was released and his condition improved to, and remained at, full health. Their third child, Shae, was born in December 2015; and their fourth, Skye, in April 2017. The family lives in Melbourne Beach, Florida.

An avid autograph and baseball card collector, Neshek has posted on message boards to interact and talk about collecting autographs. He has auctioned off some of his game-used items in exchange for memorabilia. He also encouraged other players to collect baseball cards, including Josh Donaldson. In 2017, Neshek criticized pitcher Zack Greinke for not signing several baseball cards after Greinke allegedly promised to do so at the 2017 All-Star Game, when both pitched for the National League team. He has the highest graded sets for 1970 Topps baseball, 1970–71 Topps Hockey, and 1910 Philadelphia Carmel cards, according to PSA. He also worked on collecting a complete set of autographed 1985 Topps baseball cards.

Neshek is also a fan of the baseball sim Out of the Park Baseball, commenting in a tweet on August 12, 2012: "Spent the day off yesterday playing OOTP13 Baseball for most of the day. Talk about addicting."

After the 2007 season, Neshek became a vegan.

== Awards ==
- MLB All-Star (2014, 2017)
- Minnesota Twins Dick Siebert Award (Upper Midwest League Player of the Year) (2007, 2014)

== Photos ==
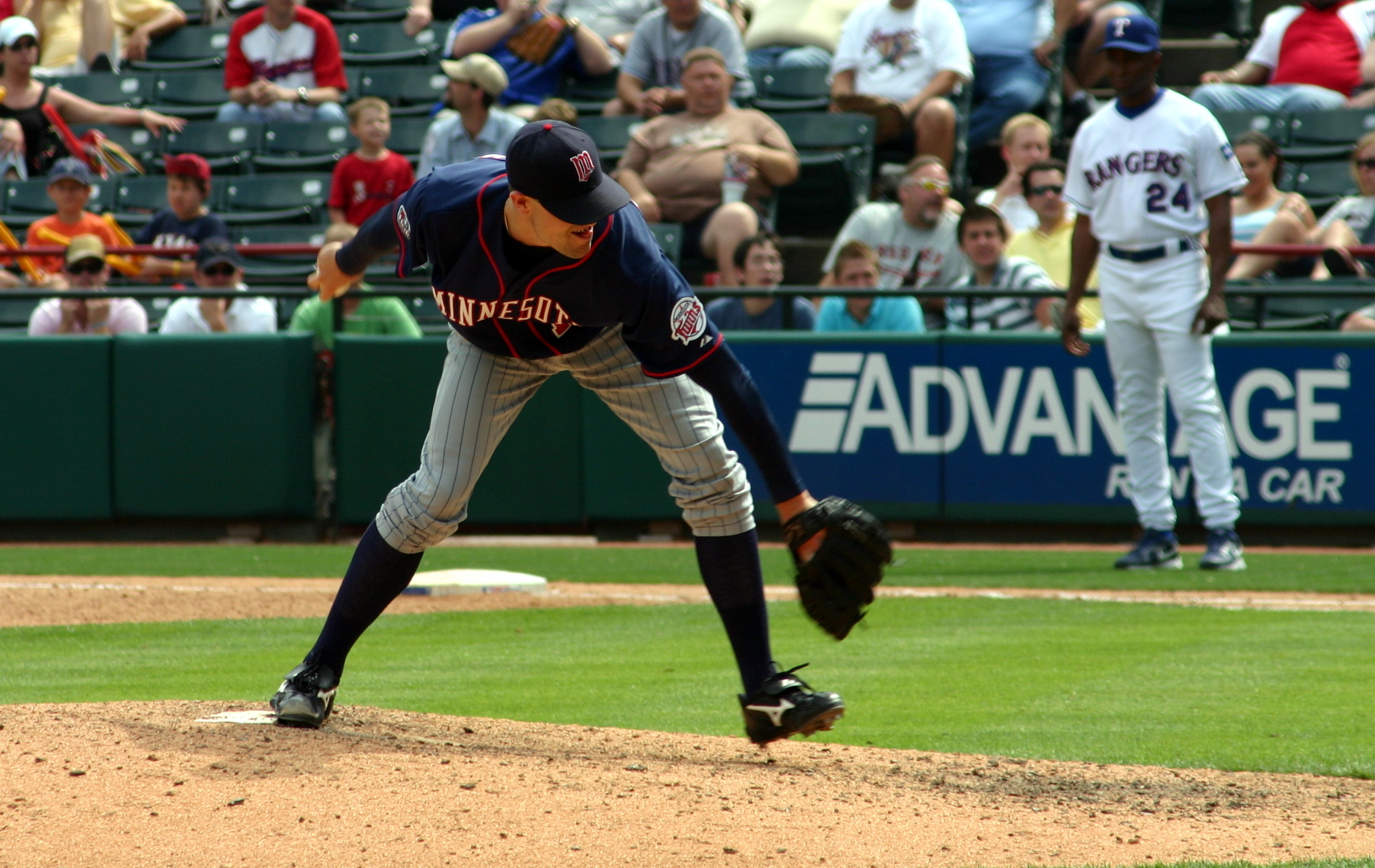
Pat Neshek pitching for the Minnesota Twins in 2007

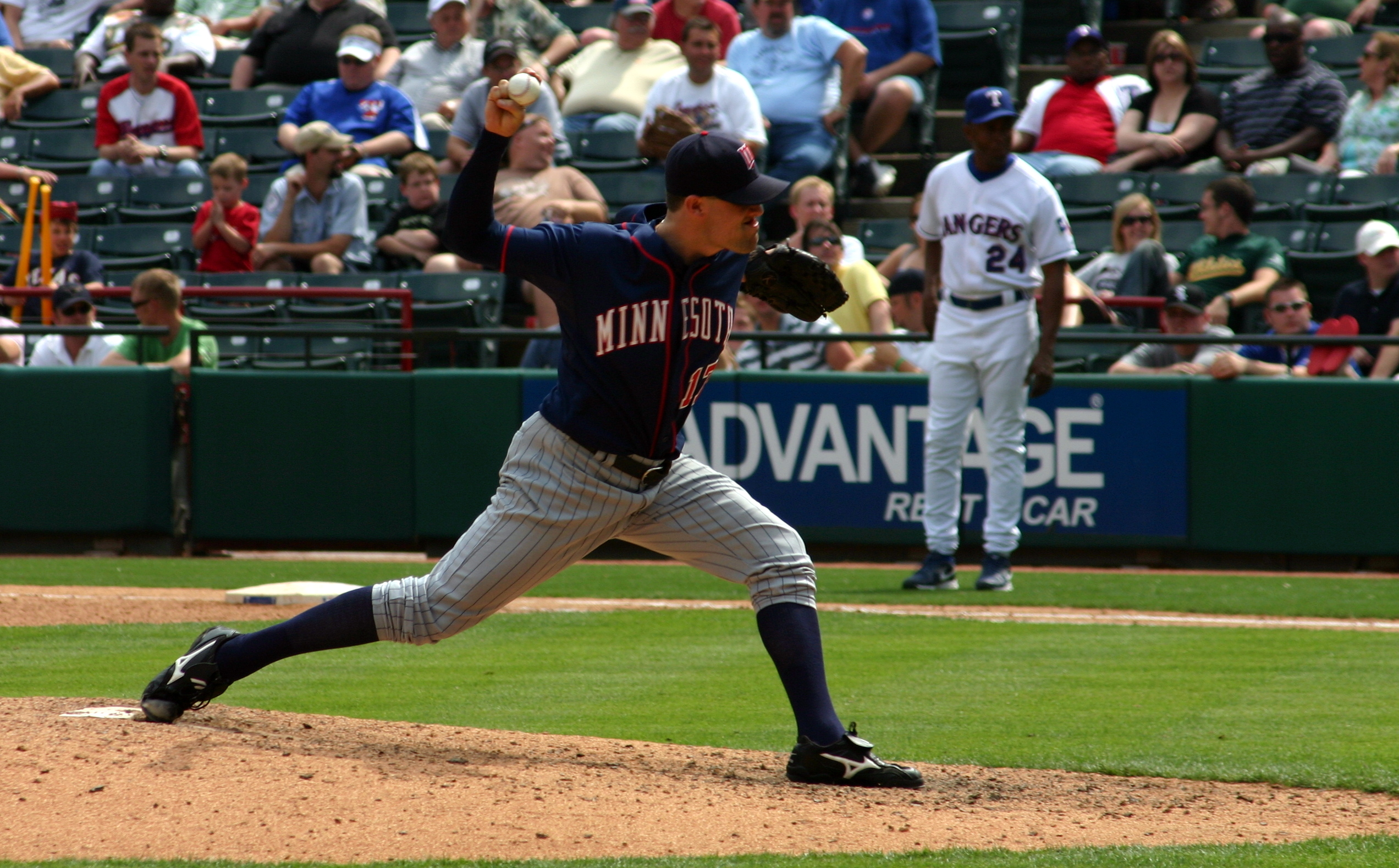
Pat Neshek pitching for the Minnesota Twins in 2007

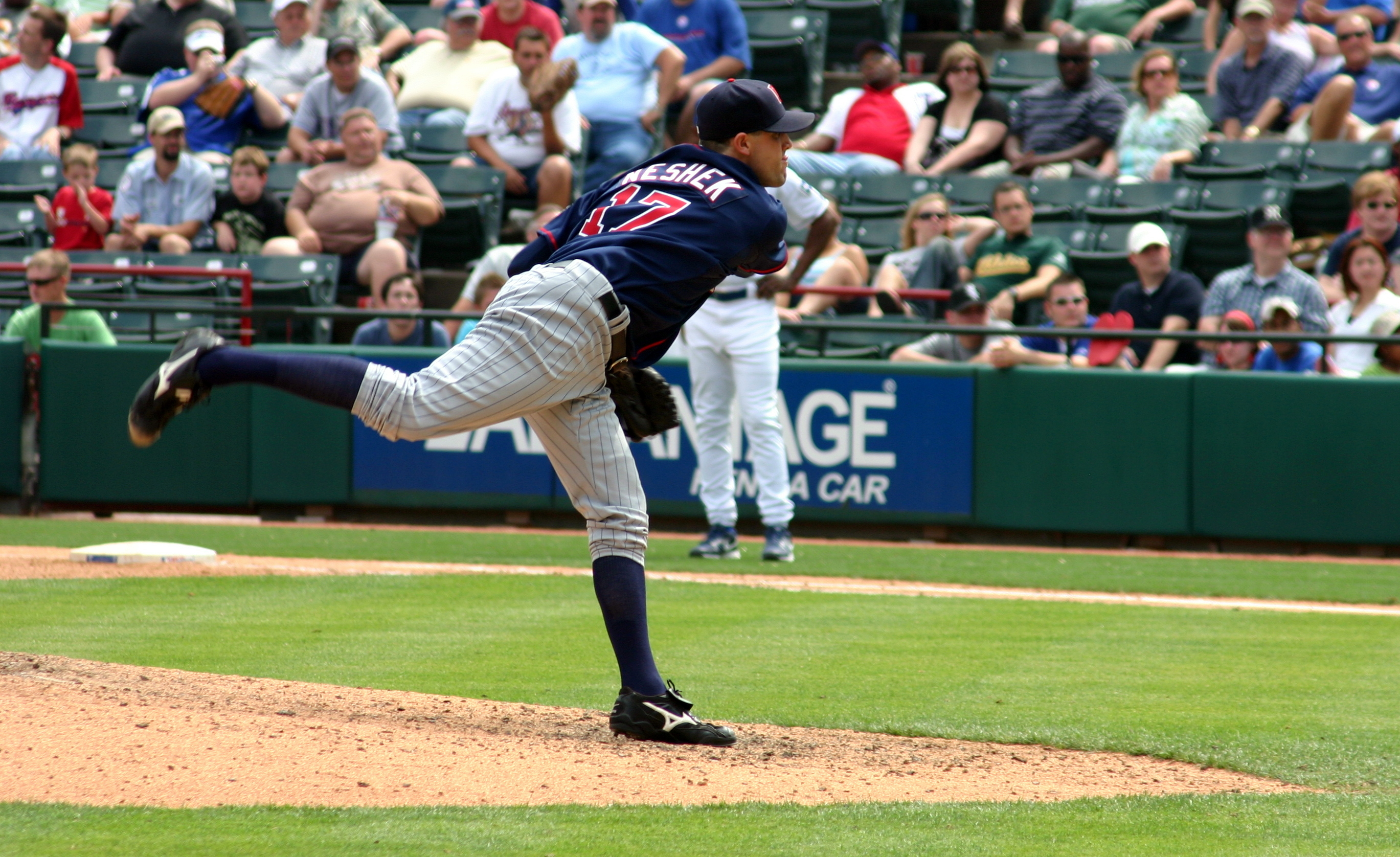
Pat Neshek pitching for the Minnesota Twins in 2007
