= Korey Jones =

American gridiron football player (born 1989)

Personal information
- Born: April 4, 1989 (age 37); Miami, Florida, U.S.
- Listed height: 6 ft 1 in (1.85 m)
- Listed weight: 230 lb (104 kg)

Career information
- Position: Linebacker (No. 44, 45)
- High school: Fort Collins (CO) Rocky Mountain
- College: Garden City CC (2009–2010); Wyoming (2011–2012)
- NFL draft: 2013: undrafted

Career history

Playing
- Arizona Cardinals (2013)*; BC Lions (2013–2014); Green Bay Packers (2014)*; Florida Blacktips (2014); Edmonton Eskimos (2015); Saskatchewan Roughriders (2016); Edmonton Eskimos (2017–2019); Winnipeg Blue Bombers (2019); Edmonton Eskimos (2020)*
- * Offseason or practice squad member only

Coaching
- Denver Broncos (2020–2025) Assistant strength and conditioning coach

Awards and highlights
- 2× Grey Cup champion (2015, 2019)
- Stats at CFL.ca

Korey Jones (born April 4, 1989) is an American professional football coach and former linebacker who was most recently an assistant strength and conditioning coach for the Denver Broncos of the National Football League (NFL). He first enrolled at Garden City Community College before transferring to the University of Wyoming. He attended Rocky Mountain High School in Fort Collins, Colorado. Jones was a member of the Arizona Cardinals, BC Lions, Green Bay Packers, Florida Blacktips, Edmonton Eskimos, Saskatchewan Roughriders, Winnipeg Blue Bombers.

== College career ==
Jones first played college football from 2009 to 2010 for the Garden City Broncbusters of Garden City Community College. He accumulated 108 tackles, four sacks and a fumble recovery. He earned Honorable Mention All-Conference honors his sophomore year in 2010.

Jones was a two-year starter for the Wyoming Cowboys of the University of Wyoming from 2011 to 2012. He recorded career totals of 162 tackles and four sacks in 25 games. He started the first five games of the 2011 season at defensive end before moving to linebacker for the final eight games. Jones was a team captain his senior year in 2012.

== Professional career ==
Jones signed with the Arizona Cardinals on April 29, 2013, after going unselected in the 2013 NFL draft. He was released by the team on August 25, 2013.

Jones joined the BC Lions of the Canadian Football League (CFL) in September 2013. He was released by the Lions on June 21, 2014.

He was signed by the Green Bay Packers on July 24, 2014. He was released on August 24, 2014.

Jones played for the Florida Blacktips of the Fall Experimental Football League in 2014.

Jones signed with the Edmonton Eskimos of the CFL on April 30, 2015. Jones played in all 18 regular season games, amassing 25 defensive tackles and 13 special teams tackles and won the Grey Cup to close the season. He was released by the team on May 29, 2016.

Jones was signed by the CFL's Saskatchewan Roughriders on June 16, 2016. Jones played 13 games for the Roughriders in the 2016 season, contributing 18 defensive tackles, 11 special teams tackles, and 1 forced fumble.

On April 15, 2017, Jones signed with the Eskimos, with whom he spent the 2015 CFL season. He was released on June 24, 2019.

Jones signed a practice roster contract with the Winnipeg Blue Bombers of the CFL on July 16, 2019. He was promoted to the active roster on August 7, 2019.

Jones re-signed with the Eskimos on February 11, 2020. He retired on March 9, 2020.

== Coaching career ==
In March 2020, Jones joined the Denver Broncos as an assistant strength and conditioning coach.
