= Ridgeview Classical Schools =

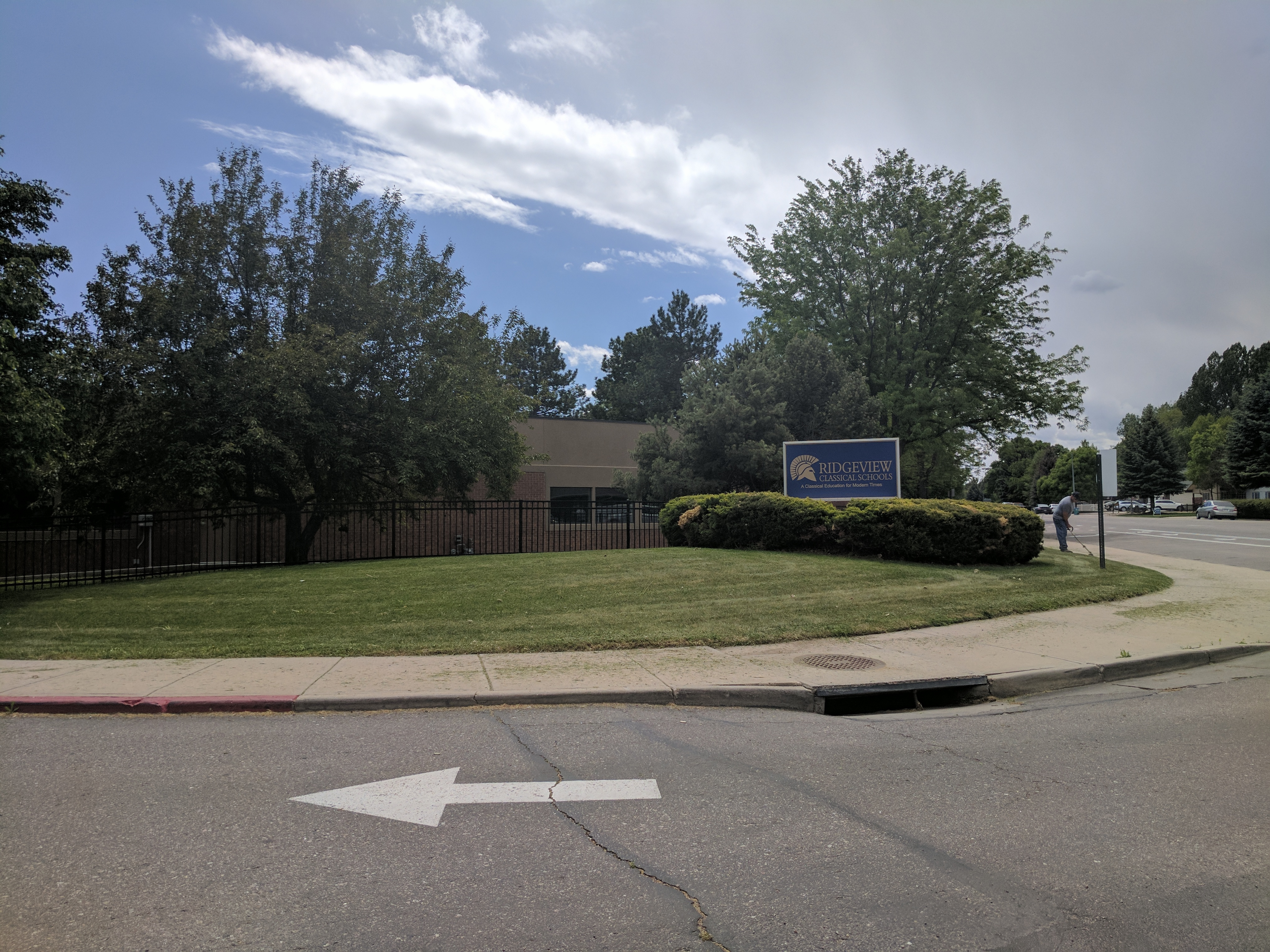
- Ridgeview Classical Schools

Location
- 1800 South Lemay; Fort Collins, Colorado 80525; United States; 40°33′46″N 105°03′26″W

Information
- Type: Charter school
- Motto: Veritati Virtutique Dedicatum – Dedicated to Truth and Virtue
- Established: 2001 (25 years ago)
- School district: Poudre School District
- CEEB code: 060598
- Headmaster: Derek Anderson
- Staff: 47.84 (FTE)
- Grades: K–12
- Student to teacher ratio: 15.07
- Colors: Blue and gold
- Mascot: Hoplite
- Website: ridgeviewclassical.org

Ridgeview Classical Schools, or Ridgeview, is a free public K–12 charter school located in Fort Collins, Colorado. Ridgeview is chartered through the Poudre School District and serves approximately 750 students, as of 2019. The school is accountable to its charter, the local school district, and the state of Colorado.

== Elementary and middle school ==
Grades K-8 follow a curriculum that was originally inspired by the Core Knowledge Sequence. Elementary students begin studying Latin in kindergarten and continue it through eighth grade. Additionally, they begin studying Greek in third grade. Ridgeview also begins teaching students cursive penmanship in third grade in a program that was developed by Michael Sull and Marie Hornback. All elementary students also study art, music, and martial arts. Students in the elementary use the Riggs phonics system to learn to read and become proficient in diagramming sentences to improve their understanding of English grammar. Ridgeview's math program is heavily influenced by the Singapore Math program, though elements of Saxon Math have also been incorporated. Character education is integrated throughout the curriculum.

== High school ==
Grades 9–12 continue with a classical, liberal arts curriculum. Ridgeview's high school courses make strong use of primary sources, and where possible, Socratic discussion in classes. Students working towards a diploma take an equal number of courses in the humanities and natural sciences. This means four years of history, science, literature, and mathematics. Additionally, students are required to take courses in government, economics, and moral philosophy. Students are required to have a proficiency in Latin in order to graduate, and they also complete a 7,000-word senior thesis and complete a three-hour, written leaving exam. Students present the senior thesis to their peers and the faculty and are required to defend it. Additionally, a variety of electives are offered, including not only AP courses, but concurrent enrollment courses through the University of Colorado's "CU Succeed Program."
