= Fossil Ridge High School (Colorado) =

Location
- 5400 Ziegler Road; Fort Collins, Colorado 80528; United States; 40°30′50″N 105°0′56″W

Information
- Type: Public high school
- Motto: Sko Ridge! / Once a sabercat, always a sabercat
- Established: 2004 (22 years ago)
- School district: Poudre School District
- CEEB code: 060606
- NCES School ID: 080399001848
- Principal: Mark Barry
- Teaching staff: 95.85 (FTE)
- Grades: 9-12
- Student to teacher ratio: 19.26
- Colors: Green, silver, black
- Athletics: Division 5A
- Mascot: SaberCat
- Website: frh.psdschools.org

Fossil Ridge High School is the newest of four public high schools in Fort Collins, Colorado, and part of the Poudre School District.

== History ==
Voters approved the opening of Fossil Ridge High School in 2000, and the school first opened to students in August 2004 with 475 students in grades 10 and 11. It was intended to help better distribute students in Fort Collins and alleviate pressure on Rocky Mountain High School.

== Athletics ==
Fossil Ridge High School participates in the 5A Front Range League.

=== Swimming ===
The boys' swim team won state championships in 2015, 2016 and 2017 while head coach Mark Morehouse was awarded National High School Coach of the Year honors by the National High School Coaches Association following the 2016 championship win. The girls' swim team won state championships in 2011-12, 2014–15, and again in 2016-17.

=== Cheerleading ===
The Fossil Ridge Cheer team won the 2019 Varsity National Championship. The varsity team also won the 2001 and 2002 Front Range League competition for the fifth consecutive year holding the title from 2014 to 2018.

=== Unified sports ===
Fossil Ridge High School has a unified sports program, which pairs students with and without disabilities together on teams. Fossil Ridge High School was named the 2015 Project Unify School of the year by the Colorado Special Olympics.

Fossil Ridge was the first high school in Fort Collins to begin a unified basketball team. It was the first school to host the Special Olympics track and field event for students from Poudre and Thompson School Districts, and the first to host the local Special Olympics flag football tournament.

== Activities ==
=== Band ===
Fossil Ridge High School Bands is directed by Aaron Herman and Hannah Peterson. Ensembles include the Wind Symphony, Symphonic Band, Concert Band, Marching Band, Winter Percussion ensemble and Winter Guard, and Jazz Band. Financial and manpower assistance is provided by the Fossil Ridge Band Boosters. FRHS Bands is affiliated with the Colorado Bandmasters Association.

Fossil Ridge High Schools Bands' concert ensembles have received numerous accolades and awards, including “Superior with Distinction” honors at CBA State Concert Band Festivals. In 2014 and 2020, all three concert ensembles earned Superior ratings at the CBA Regional Concert Band Festival. The Wind Symphony was selected to perform at the Colorado Music Educators Association's Clinic/Conference in 2012, 2015, 2020, and 2024, and attended the prestigious Music for All National Concert Band Festival in 2012 and 2016. The Fossil Ridge Band program has been nominated for the prestigious Sudler Flag of Honor from the John Philip Sousa Foundation and is a recipient of the National Programs of Excellence Blue Ribbon Award from the National Band Association.

The Fossil Ridge Marching Band is the only ensemble of its kind in the Poudre School District and accepts students from other district high schools and middle schools. The 2025 FRHS Marching Band includes approximately 135 musicians and color guard.

The FRHS Marching Band is a CBA Division 5A competitive ensemble and won the division's state championship title in 2012, 2013, 2018, 2019, 2022, 2023, 2024, and 2025. (The 2020 CBA State Championship was canceled, and no championship title was awarded.) The marching band also competes in Bands of America's AAA Division, winning its division's championship title at Flagstaff in 2023 and Las Cruces in 2024 and placing second overall at Flagstaff in 2022. The band was selected as a finalist at its first BOA competition at St. George in 2019. In October 2025, the FRHS Marching Band competed in its first BOA super regional competition at The Dome at America’s Center in St. Louis, placing 19th out of 65 bands in semi-finals.

FRHS Bands and the Fossil Ridge Band Boosters host the CBA-sanctioned Fossil Ridge Marching Festival at the Poudre School District Stadium at Timnath Middle-High School. The festival is a "one-and-done" competition in which all bands are judged on a single performance and receive scores and rankings. On September 20, 2025 fourteen Colorado-based marching bands (9 from Division 5A, 3 from Division 4A, and one each from Division 3A and 2A) participated in the 2nd Annual Fossil Ridge Marching Festival.

Founded in 2021 and under the direction of Destiny Smith, the Fossil Ridge Winter Guard participates in both the Rocky Mountain Color Guard Association's and Winter Guard International's competition circuits. The group claimed its RMCGA division's championship titles in 2022, 2024, and 2025. The winter guard's associated Fossil Ridge Middle School Winter Guard claimed its first state RMCGA championship title in 2025.

Also founded in 2021 and under the direction Matt Hauser, the Fossil Ridge Winter Percussion ensemble participates in the Rocky Mountain Percussion Association's and Winter Guard International's competition circuits. The group claimed its RMPA division's championship titles in 2022, 2023, and 2025.

=== Knowledge Bowl ===
Fossil Ridge's Knowledge Bowl team won the Colorado state title in 2012 and 2013. The team took second place in the state in the interscholastic academic competition in 2014, and claimed the state title again in 2015 and 2016.

=== Newspaper ===
The school's monthly newspaper, Etched In Stone, won the Colorado High School Press Association's 2012 Best In Show: Website Award, as well as the National Scholastic Press Association's Pacemaker Finalist Award.

=== Theater ===
The school's Improv team ranked first in the state in the International Thespian Society's state conferences in 2015 and 2016.

== School design ==
Fossil Ridge High School was the first Leadership in Energy and Environmental Design (LEED) high school in Colorado. The building was constructed out of environmentally friendly materials and has double-pane windows and solar panels. The school also has energy-efficient lighting, heating and cooling systems, and sustainable landscape design.

As a result of its design, Fossil Ridge's energy savings are about 60 percent. The school saves approximately $100,000 a year in utilities. The Discovery Channel hosted a special, highlighting energy saving at the school and its importance in modern society.

== Notable alumni ==
- Kelley Johnson (class of 2010), Miss Colorado 2015
- Sophia Smith (class of 2018), soccer player for the Portland Thorns and first pick in the 2020 NWSL College Draft.
- Jaelin Howell (class of 2018), soccer player for the USWNT and Florida State University.
- Codi Heuer (class of 2015), MLB pitcher for the Chicago Cubs
- Brady Russell (class of 2017), Super Bowl LX champion NFL tight end for the Seattle Seahawks
- Tanner Arkin (class of 2021), college football tight end for the Illinois Fighting Illini
- Trey Zuhn III (class of 2021), college football offensive tackle for the Texas A&M Aggies
- Makenna Kelly (class of 2023), YouTuber
