= Polaris Expeditionary Learning School =

School in Fort Collins, Colorado

Location
- 1905 Orchard Place; Fort Collins, Colorado 80521; United States; 40°34′41″N 105°06′48″W

Information
- Other name: Lab School for Creative Learning (K-5) (until 2015)
- Former name: Pioneer Charter School (until 2008)
- CEEB code: 060601
- NCES School ID: 080399006334
- Principal: Starr Hill
- Faculty: 25.14
- Grades: K-12
- Enrollment: 403 (2018-19)
- Student to teacher ratio: 16.03
- Colors: Blue and silver
- Mascot: Penguin
- Website: pol.psdschools.org

Polaris Expeditionary Learning School is an alternative (school of choice) K-12 school in Fort Collins, Colorado and part of the Poudre School District.

Polaris Expeditionary Learning School used to be known as Pioneer, but had to change its name due to district policy and lack of funding to continue as a charter.

Polaris Expeditionary Learning School has an "Adventure Program" that allows students to go on week-long field trips or "Intensives" in order to gain school credit. These Intensives typically happen three times a year. Some students go backpacking for PE credit, while others get elective credit doing beekeeping, cooking, skateboard making, and many other choices, along with active service projects in the community throughout the year.

After the 2022-2023 School Year, Joe Gawronski, the founding principal of Polaris retired, and the position moved to the previous Vice Principal, Starr Hill.
