= Brady Russell =

American football player (born 1998)

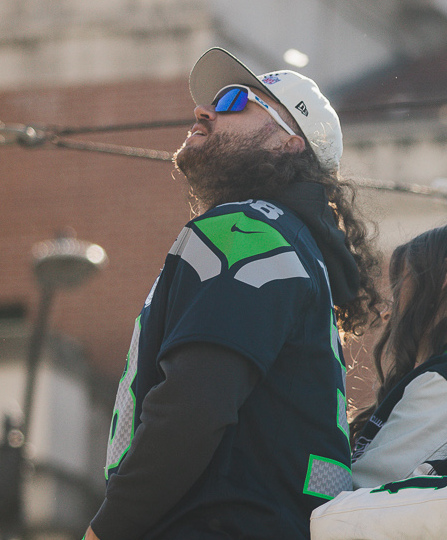
- Russell at the Super Bowl LX parade

No. 38 – Seattle Seahawks
- Position: Fullback
- Roster status: Active

Personal information
- Born: August 31, 1998 (age 28); Camp Pendleton, California, U.S.
- Listed height: 6 ft 3 in (1.91 m)
- Listed weight: 250 lb (113 kg)

Career information
- High school: Fossil Ridge (Fort Collins, Colorado)
- College: Colorado (2017–2022)
- NFL draft: 2023: undrafted

Career history
- Philadelphia Eagles (2023)*; Seattle Seahawks (2023–present)
- * Offseason or practice squad member only

Awards and highlights
- Super Bowl champion (LX)

Career NFL statistics as of 2025
- Total tackles: 31
- Fumble recoveries: 1
- Stats at Pro Football Reference

Brady Russell (born August 31, 1998) is an American professional football fullback for the Seattle Seahawks of the National Football League (NFL). He played college football for the Colorado Buffaloes and was signed by the Philadelphia Eagles as an undrafted free agent in 2023.

== Early life ==
Russell was born on August 31, 1998, at Camp Pendleton in California. Several of his family members were also involved in athletics: his father, Randy, and uncle, Marc Booth, both played football for the Arkansas Razorbacks; his uncle, Matt, played for the Colorado Buffaloes and is an executive with the Philadelphia Eagles; his brother, Cody, played for the Northern Colorado Bears and another brother, Tyler, ran track at Navy.

Russell attended Fossil Ridge High School in Fort Collins, Colorado, initially being a track athlete before switching to football and playing defensive end as well as some tight end. He was the team's most valuable player as both a junior and senior, twice earning first-team All-Front Range League honors on defense, as well as one second-team selection on offense. He was a two-star recruit and opted to walk-on at Football Bowl Subdivision Colorado rather than accept a scholarship offer from Football Championship Subdivision Northern Colorado.

== College career ==
As a true freshman at Colorado in 2017, Russell spent time learning how to play outside linebacker and tight end, quickly being made the latter while spending the season on the scout team. He was named Colorado's 2017 Offensive Scout Player of the Year. He impressed in training camp in 2018 and was given a scholarship prior to the regular season, despite it taking most walk-ons at minimum three years to earn it, if ever. Russell was placed second on the depth chart to begin the 2018 season. He totaled five receptions for 41 yards on the year.

In 2019, Russell made 23 catches for 221 yards with two touchdowns, exceeding the amount of catches made by Colorado tight ends in the prior three years (18). The following year, he was named team captain, but suffered an injury in the second game that sidelined him for the season. He had his best season in 2021, recording a team-leading 25 receptions for 307 yards while being a nominee for the Burlsworth Trophy, given to the best player who started his career as a walk-on. Russell returned for a final year in 2022 and posted 20 catches for 153 yards with no scores. He finished his stint at the school with 78 receptions for 799 yards with three touchdowns.

== Professional career ==
Pre-draft measurables
Height	Weight	Arm length	Hand span	Wingspan	40-yard dash	10-yard split	20-yard split	20-yard shuttle	Three-cone drill	Vertical jump	Broad jump	Bench press
6 ft 2 7/8 in (1.90 m)	247 lb (112 kg)	34 1/2 in (0.88 m)	9 1/8 in (0.23 m)	6 ft 7 in (2.01 m)	4.75 s	1.66 s	2.79 s	4.37 s	7.25 s	34.5 in (0.88 m)	9 ft 9 in (2.97 m)	21 reps
All values from Pro Day

=== Philadelphia Eagles ===
After going unselected in the 2023 NFL draft, Russell was signed by the Philadelphia Eagles as an undrafted free agent. He was waived on August 29, 2023 and re-signed to the practice squad.

=== Seattle Seahawks ===
Russell was signed off the Eagles' practice squad to the 53-man roster of the Seattle Seahawks on September 20, 2023. He played in 15 games for Seattle and recorded 7 tackles. Russell made 11 appearances for the Seahawks in 2024 and recorded 11 tackles. On January 2, 2025, Russell was placed on injured reserve with a foot injury, ending his season.

On April 9, 2025, Russell signed his exclusive rights free agent contract with the Seahawks. During the 2025 off-season, Russell changed positions from tight end to fullback under new offensive coordinator Klint Kubiak, who planned to use the position in a greater capacity than previous offensive coordinator Ryan Grubb, who did not employ an official fullback during his time with the Seahawks. Russell made the Seahawks' 53-man roster as a special teamer and reserve fullback and tight end. Russell played in Super Bowl LX, a 29–13 victory over the New England Patriots.He finished the 2025 season with 8 tackles and a fumble recovery.

On March 12, 2026, Russell re-signed with the team on a two-year, $4.8 million contract. Russell had 2 receptions for 20 yards and 1 tackle in a rematch of Super Bowl LX against the Patriots in Week 1 of the 2026 season that the Seahawks won 13-10..

== NFL career statistics ==
Legend
	Won the Super Bowl
**Bold**	Career High

=== Regular season ===
Year	Team	Games		Tackles				Fumbles			
Year	Team	GP	GS	Cmb	Solo	Ast	Sck	FF	FR	Yds	TD
2023	SEA	15	0	7	5	2	0	0	0	0	0
2024	SEA	11	0	10	6	**4**	0	0	0	0	0
2025	SEA	**17**	**1**	**14**	**10**	**4**	0	0	**1**	**3**	0
Career		43	1	31	21	10	0	0	1	3	0

=== Postseason ===
Year	Team	Games		Tackles				Fumbles			
Year	Team	GP	GS	Cmb	Solo	Ast	Sck	FF	FR	Yds	TD
2025	SEA	**3**	0	**4**	**1**	**3**	0	0	0	0	0
Career		3	0	4	1	3	0	0	0	0	0
