= Trey Zuhn =

American football player (born 2002)

Trey Zuhn III
No. 66 – Las Vegas Raiders
- Position: Guard
- Roster status: Active

Personal information
- Born: October 12, 2002 (age 24)
- Listed height: 6 ft 7 in (2.01 m)
- Listed weight: 319 lb (145 kg)

Career information
- High school: Fossil Ridge (Fort Collins, Colorado)
- College: Texas A&M (2021–2025)
- NFL draft: 2026: 3rd round, 91st overall pick

Career history
- Las Vegas Raiders (2026–present)

Awards and highlights
- First-team All-SEC (2025); SEC Jacobs Blocking Trophy (2025)

Career NFL statistics as of Week 4, 2026
- Games played: 4
- Stats at Pro Football Reference

Trey Zuhn III (born October 12, 2002) is an American professional football guard for the Las Vegas Raiders of the National Football League (NFL). He played college football for the Texas A&M Aggies and was selected by the Raiders in the third round of the 2026 NFL draft.

== Early life ==
Zuhn III attended Fossil Ridge High School in Fort Collins, Colorado. Coming out of high school, he was rated as a four-star recruit and committed to play college football for the Texas A&M Aggies. Zuhn is the first player from Fossil Ridge High School to be drafted to the NFL, as well as the first from Fort Collins since 1998.

== College career ==
As a freshman in 2021, Zuhn III was redshirted. In 2022, he made 11 starts. In the 2023 season, Zuhn III started all 13 games. For his performance during week 2 of the 2024 season, he was named the SEC offensive lineman of the week in a victory over Florida. During the 2024 season, Zuhn III started all 13 games, where he took every snap at left tackle, allowing just 15 pressures. He earned third-team all-SEC honors. Heading into the 2025 season, Zuhn III was named a team captain, while also earning preseason first-team all-SEC honors, and being named to the Lombardi award watchlist.

== Professional career ==
Pre-draft measurables
Height	Weight	Arm length	Hand span	Wingspan	40-yard dash	10-yard split	20-yard split	Vertical jump	Broad jump	Bench press
6 ft 6 1/2 in (1.99 m)	312 lb (142 kg)	32 1/2 in (0.83 m)	10 in (0.25 m)	6 ft 8 7/8 in (2.05 m)	5.03 s	1.70 s	2.83 s	32.0 in (0.81 m)	9 ft 3 in (2.82 m)	33 reps
All values from NFL Combine/Pro Day

Zuhn III was selected by the Las Vegas Raiders with the 91st overall pick in the third round of the 2026 NFL draft.

== Personal life ==
Zuhn III is the son of Jimmy and Karen Zuhn, where Jimmy played college football at Tulsa, while Karen played volleyball at Texas A&M.
