= Poudre School District =

Public school district in Larimer County, Colorado

Address
- 2407 LaPorte Avenue Fort Collins, Colorado, 80521; United States
- Coordinates: 40°35′20″N 105°7′13″W

District information
- Type: Unified school district
- Grades: P–12
- Established: July 1960; 66 years ago
- Superintendent: Brian Kingsley
- School board: 7 members
- Chair of the board: Kristen Draper
- Schools: 52
- Budget: $452,648,000
- NCES District ID: 0803990

Students and staff
- Students: 29,772
- Teachers: 1,886.60 (on an FTE basis)
- Staff: 4,316.14 (on an FTE basis)
- Student–teacher ratio: 15.78

Other information
- Website: psdschools.org

The Poudre School District (R-1) is a preK–12 public school district in Larimer County in northern Colorado. The district operates and manages the public schools in the city of Fort Collins, as well as in the towns of Wellington, Timnath, parts of Loveland and Windsor, and unincorporated communities of Larimer County including Laporte, Red Feather Lakes, Stove Prairie, and Livermore. The district is the eighth largest in the state and enrollment has been falling or relatively flat since 2020.

The district was formed in 1960 by the consolidation of several dozen existing districts in Larimer County, and is the ninth largest in the state. The district manages 31 elementary schools, eight middle schools, four comprehensive high schools, two middle-high schools, two K-12 schools, two alternative high schools, and a Career Tech Center. Additionally, the district offers early childhood education at 20 sites. Five Fort Collins charter schools are chartered through PSD: Fort Collins Montessori School, Mountain Sage Community School, Ridgeview Classical School and Liberty Common, and Compass Community Collaborative School. The district is led by a seven-member Board of Education.

The school district is one of the largest employers in Fort Collins. PSD has some of the highest state assessment scores in the state, consistently leading the state average by double-digits in all grades and subjects on PSAT, SAT, and CMAS (Colorado Measures of Academic Success) testing. The district's four-year graduation rate was 86.9% for the Class of 2023. In the 2023-24 school year, the district had a total PK-12 enrollment of 29,914.

== History ==
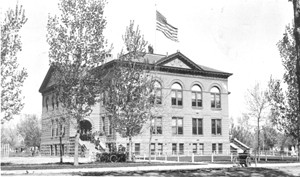
The original school building, c. 1910

The first school in Fort Collins was a one-room school house located in Auntie Stone's cabin from 1866 to 1887. In 1887, the Franklin building was completed at the corner of Mountain and Howes and the students all moved to the new facility. The Fort Collins High School occupied the top floor of the Franklin building, and the lower grades, 1st-8th, met together in the bottom of the building. In 1903, the high school and several of the grade level classes were moved to a new location on Meldrum street where the current Lincoln Center now stands. Through this period of time, the middle grades were grouped together with the lower grades and simply called the grade school. By 1920, Wellington and Waverly both had junior high schools. But it wasn't until 1922 that Fort Collins rearranged the grades in order to have a junior high. In the beginning, the junior high only consisted of eighth grade, with most of the students located within the Fort Collins High School building. In 1925, the high school moved to a new location, 1400 Remington Street (now used for the arts at CSU), and the junior high took over the building. A memorial to the old school building, written at the time of its demolition in the mid-1970s, states that the Fort Collins Junior High was departmentalized in 1928.

In October 2026, the PSD board voted to approve a plan to close or consolidate several schools citing falling birthrate and families moving to more affordable areas. The approved plan includes closure of Beattie Elementary, Johnson Elementary, Putnam Elementary, and Blevins Middle prior to the start of the 2027-28 school year, with Irish Escuela Bilingüe and Timnath Elementary (unless Timnath secures its own funding) following at the start of 2028-29. Centennial High School and Poudre Community Academy will be consolidated into a new school prior to the 2027-28 school year. The closure of three mountain schools, Livermore Elementary, Red Feather elementary, and Stove Prairie was originally proposed, but was cancelled after community pushback.

== Elementary schools ==
- Bacon
- Bamford
- Bauder
- Beattie
- Bennett, and IB World School
- Bethke Core Knowledge
- Cache La Poudre, an IB World School
- Dunn, an IB World School
- Eyestone
- Fort Collins Montessori (charter)
- Harris Bilingual
- Irish Escuela Bilingüe
- Johnson
- Kruse
- Laurel (arts and technology)
- Liberty Common (charter)
- Linton
- Livermore
- Lopez, a Leader in Me Legacy School
- McGraw, an IB World School
- Mountain Sage (charter)
- O'Dea Core Knowledge
- Olander (project-based learning)
- Polaris Expeditionary Learning
- PSD Global Academy (PGA)
- Putnam
- Red Feather
- Rice, a Leader in Me School
- Ridgeview Classical (charter)
- Riffenburgh, an IB World School
- Shepardson (STEM)
- Stove Prairie
- Tavelli (STEAM)
- Timnath
- Traut Core Knowledge
- Werner
- Zach Core Knowledge

== Middle schools ==
- Blevins
- Boltz
- Cache La Poudre, an IB World School
- Compass (charter)
- Kinard Core Knowledge
- Lesher, an IB World School
- Liberty Common School (charter)
- Lincoln, an IB World School
- Mountain Sage (charter)
- Polaris Expeditionary Learning
- Preston (STEM)
- PSD Global Academy
- Ridgeview Classical (charter)
- Webber

== Middle-high schools ==
- Timnath
- Wellington

== High schools ==
Poudre School District operates four comprehensive public senior high schools in Fort Collins. Each serves students in different neighborhood sections of the city. The district also operates two alternative high schools for students who thrive in smaller environments or require flexible educational options, as well as two K-12 schools with high school programming: PSD Global Academy and Polaris. Three public charter high schools are chartered through PSD: Ridgeview Classical Schools, Compass Community Collaborative (grades 6-12), and Liberty Common High School.

- Centennial High School
- Compass (charter)
- Fort Collins High School
- Fossil Ridge High School
- Liberty Common High School (charter)
- Polaris Expeditionary Learning School
- Poudre Community Academy (PCA)
- Poudre High School
- PSD Global Academy (PGA)
- Ridgeview Classical Schools (charter)
- Rocky Mountain High School

== Growth and long-range facilities plan ==
Poudre School District is one of the fastest growing districts in northern Colorado, adding about 500 students (equivalent to the size of an elementary school) every year. To accommodate the rapid growth, the district plans to build three new schools. These will include one combined middle/high school in Wellington, another middle/high school east of I-25, and one elementary school in southeast Fort Collins. The school board approved the long-range facilities plan on April 26, 2016, opening the possibility of seeking an associated $375 million bond to fund the construction. Board members were scheduled to decide by August 9, 2016 whether to include the bond vote on the November 2016 ballot. Increasing property values within district boundaries, coupled with the retirement of a former bond debt, means the current property tax rate would not increase for residents, the Fort Collins Coloradoan reports.

If the bond is not approved by the board or passed by voters, the school district will implement an alternative growth plan to accommodate the booming student population, including managing school choice, adding modular classrooms outside crowded schools, changing school boundaries and creating larger class sizes.

== Sustainability ==
PSD has received several national awards for its efforts to reduce environmental impact and utility costs and educate students on sustainability. PSD was one of the first school districts in the country to create a Sustainability Management System in 2006, which integrates all schools and departments into a plan to reduce environmental impact. Since then, the district has achieved over 300 Energy Star awards from the US Environmental Protection Agency for energy efficiency, and saved over $2 million in electrical and natural gas costs.

In 2016, the US Department of Education recognized Poudre School District as a Green Ribbon Schools District Sustainability Awardee, one of just 15 districts across the country to earn the award. The award recognizes the district's success in reducing greenhouse gas emissions by 5,000 tons since 2006, diverting nearly 1,000 tons of waste (the environmental equivalent of planting more than 16,000 trees and letting them grow for a decade), and creating curriculum that teaches the principles of sustainability.

Additionally, the US Department of Energy recognized PSD as one of the top five Education Sector partners to reach and exceed both its water and energy savings goals in the 2016 Better Buildings Challenge. The district achieved 25 percent energy savings over the last five years, and a 29 percent reduction in water use.

== 21st-century learning ==
Funds from the 2010 bond/mill levy override were used to improve access to educational technology in all schools. The money provided for a team of ed tech trainers, who teach teachers how to integrate technology like laptops and SmartBoards into their classroom through hands-on collaboration and professional development classes. As a result, teachers have produced curriculum, such as Skyping national experts into the classroom to chat with students about hot topics, or integrating NPR podcasts into English classes to connect classic novels to modern day injustices. PSD's goal is to provide a learning environment for all students that closely resembles 21st-century workplaces.

Partnerships with local engineering companies like HP, Intel, Otterbox, Avago, and AMD have proved beneficial for students, exposing them to concepts like design thinking during the annual elementary Engineering Week and providing resources to create dynamic Maker Spaces in school media centers, areas open to any student that are outfitted with everything from 3D printers to sewing machines.

In 2016, a female undergrad student attending Colorado State University started an engineering club just for girls at Zach Elementary School, to provide the kind of hands-on engineering experiences she wished she'd had growing up.

== French Field ==
French Field is a sporting arena in Fort Collins Colorado that is used primarily by the city's four public senior high schools for their sporting events such as football, soccer, lacrosse, and track and field events. It was initially constructed in 1974, located on the Rocky Mountain High School campus. The stadium is capable of seating 6,000 spectators and is used for day and nighttime events, and is equipped with full field lighting.

Because French Field is immediately adjacent to Rocky Mountain High School, a common misconception is to assume that is used only by Rocky Mountain High School. However, it is also used by the other public senior high schools, including Poudre High School, Fort Collins High School and Fossil Ridge High School.

The stadium is equipped with a standard football field and goalposts but is also marked for use in soccer and lacrosse games. The stadium also has an all-weather track that circles the playing field, which is used by the Poudre School District for its track and field events, involving not only the city's high schools, but also many junior high schools and elementary schools. Other non-Poudre School District sports leagues do, occasionally, make use of the stadium for championship events, but in general the stadium is used only for school-related athletic events. Approximately thirty-five to forty athletic events take place at the stadium each fall and spring.

French Field is capable of seating 6,000 spectators, with the stadium divided into home and away bleachers. The home team stands are larger in width and height. Several press boxes also sit atop the home bleachers and are used by school coaches, stadium announcers, and radio sportscasters. French Field's away stands are smaller, since games are typically played against out-of-city teams; however, on occasion, in-town teams are pitted against each other, and the away school can easily fill French Field's away bleachers. Six floodlight towers are capable of fully illuminating the field for nighttime games. Both sets of spectator stands offer concessions stands and bathrooms, but away stands have only two ticket windows, while the home stands operate four. There are basic locker rooms for both home and away sports teams and officials, and Poudre Valley Hospital provides ambulance services to all varsity football games and many other sporting events.

New sound and lighting systems as well as a new scoreboard were installed in 2007, and the stadium's press boxes and ticket booths were updated with newer electrical and heating systems since its initial construction in 1974.
