= Rocky Mountain High School (Colorado) =

- One of Rocky Mountain High School's academic logos

Location
- 1300 West Swallow Road; Fort Collins, Colorado 80526; United States; 40°32′48″N 105°6′0″W

Information
- Type: Public high school
- Motto: The Lobo Way
- Established: 1973 (53 years ago)
- School district: Poudre School District
- CEEB code: 060588
- Principal: Conrad Crist
- Staff: 103.13 (FTE)
- Grades: 9–12
- Enrollment: 2,056 (2023-2024)
- Student to teacher ratio: 19.94
- Colors: Cardinal red and yellow gold
- Athletics: 5A
- Mascot: Lobo
- Website: rmh.psdschools.org

Rocky Mountain High School (RMHS, Rocky) is a public high school located in Fort Collins, Colorado, and part of the Poudre School District. Its colors are cardinal red and gold and its mascot is the lobo, or wolf. The school serves roughly 2,000 students, mostly from South, West, and central Fort Collins. Rocky Mountain High School opened at its current location in 1973 and was expanded in 1994.

== History ==
Rocky Mountain High School was founded in 1973. Its student body was made up of sophomores and juniors originally from Fort Collins High School and Poudre High School. The campus was made of three separate buildings. In 1994 to 1995, the school's campus was redesigned to make one large building from the original three separate ones. A new media center, theatre, vocal music room, larger commons area, and a fitness center were added during this remodel. In 2005, an auxiliary gym and multipurpose room were added. Rocky started as a three-year high school, but as part of a grade reconfiguration in Poudre School District, it became a four-year high school. The class of 2009 had 692 seniors, the largest senior class the school has ever had.

== Extracurricular activities ==
=== Student-run publications ===
Rocky Mountain High School students have been running an online magazine called "The Highlighter" since 2016. The publication is an online news source that values reliability and involvement with the student body. Students also create and publish an annual yearbook.

=== Athletics ===
Rocky Mountain High School has over 20 sport teams for both Boys and Girls.

- Boys:
  - Baseball- Varsity, JV, Freshman, Basketball: Varsity, JV, Freshman, Cross Country: Varsity, JV, Football: Varsity, JV, Freshman, Golf: Varsity, Ice Hockey: Varsity, JV, Lacrosse: Varsity, JV, Freshman, Skiing (Nordic): Varsity, Soccer: Varsity, JV, Freshman, Swimming: Varsity, Tennis: Varsity, JV, Track and Field: Varsity, Unified Flag Football: Varsity, JV, Wrestling: Varsity, JV
- Girls:
  - Basketball: Varsity, JV, Freshman, Cross Country: Varsity, JV, Dance (Spirit): Varsity, JV, Cheer (Spirit): Varsity, JV, Field Hockey: JV, Golf: Varsity, JV, Gymnastics: Varsity, Lacrosse: Varsity, JV, Freshman, Skiing (Nordic): Varsity, Soccer: Varsity, JV, Freshman, Softball: Varsity, JV, Freshman, Swimming: Varsity, Tennis: Varsity, JV, Freshman, Track and Field: Varsity, Unified Flag Football: Varsity, JV,Unified Cheer Varsity, Volleyball: Varsity, JV

=== Athletic awards ===
Athletes who are in good standing in school and athletics at Rocky Mountain High School have the chance to earn various academic- athletic awards, acknowledging their work and success during the school year. These programs are designed to reward students who have combined success in not just their academic field but also athletic field as well. The following awards are accredited to the most fitting student-athletes, The Academic All-State Award, The Honor Athletes, The Troxell Award, The Lobo Award, and lastly The Wayne Moddelmog Award

== Notable alumni ==
- Andy Burns - 2008 graduate; Baseball player.
- Rick Dennison - former linebacker, Denver Broncos NFL Assistant Coach.
- Marco Gonzales - 2010 graduate; Major League Baseball pitcher for the Seattle Mariners; Colorado Gatorade Baseball Player of the Year Recipient
- Katie Herzig - Grammy award-nominated singer/songwriter
- Estelle Johnson - WPSL player
- Korey Jones - CFL player
- Derek Vincent Smith - American electronic music producer; Pretty Lights

== Test scores and rankings ==
Rocky Mountain High School is overall ranked at #75 in Colorado high schools, and #5 in the Fort Collins and Loveland area. Student polls say that students think of their high school as somewhat better than others in the Poudre district, and that students come to learn, with not much regard referring to future plans. The overall graduation rate at Rocky Mountain High is an 88%, where the average SAT score is 1220, and ACT score average being 26. 77% of students pass AP exams from the 9 AP courses offered at the school. 68% of students show proficiency in reading, and 47% of students show proficiency in math.
