= Ada-Rhodes Short =

Roboticist

Ada-Rhodes Wish
- Born: Ada-Rhodes Short; Calgary, Alberta
- Citizenship: Canadian
- Education: Oregon State University
- Scientific career
- Fields: robotics, computational cognition, design
- Workplaces: University of Nebraska Omaha, Sphero, Lora DiCarlo
- Thesis: Autonomous Decision Making Facing Uncertainty, Risk, and Complexity (2018)
- Doctoral advisor: Bryony DuPont

Ada-Rhodes Wish (née Short) is a Canadian mechanical engineer, roboticist, and transgender rights activist. She is the co-host of the podcast Totally Trans: Searching for the Trans Canon alongside writer Henry Giardina. She is a co-founder of Baylor University's first LGBTQ student group. She is a co-creator of Osé, a hands-free device for blended orgasms, which won a 2019 CES Innovation Award in the robotics and drones category.

== Education and activism ==
In 2010, Wish attended Baylor University and attempted to gain recognition for a club to discuss sexuality and combat homophobia. This group became Gamma Alpha Upsilon, Baylor's unofficial LGBTQ student organisation. She gained her Bachelor of Science degree in Mechanical Engineering in 2014. She has a Master of Science in Mechanical Engineering from Colorado School of Mines (2016), where she modeled risk for autonomous decision making. Wish completed her PhD at Oregon State University under Dr. Bryony DuPont, publishing a dissertation on building a computationally cognitive agent that can handle black swan events. In 2018, Wish delivered a speech at the Corvallis Women's March on food instability and housing insecurity in the transgender community. She was the recipient of the 2019 Soroptimists Ruby Award for Women Helping Women in recognition of her mutual aid and activism work. In 2021, Wish was involved in the fight against anti-trans legislation in Texas and helped start the protest group Trans Resistance of Texas (TRoT).

== Career ==
Wish worked at Sphero as a mechanical engineer between 2014 and 2017, and co-developed a patented multi-body self-propelled device that was used in the Star Wars BB-8 Robot toy. Then, she was hired as Senior Mechatronic Design Engineer in 2018 by Lora DiCarlo, a sexual technology company, where she worked until 2020. While at Lora DiCarlo, Wish co-developed the Osé, a hands-free device for blended orgasms. The Osé won a 2019 CES Innovation Award in the robotics and drones category. The award was rescinded due to a CES policy forbidding indecent companies from exhibiting on the show floor, but later reinstated after CES organisers were accused of sexism.

== "Dionu" art movement ==
Wish is one of the contributors to the performance art project and book "Dionu: The Unnamed Faith of the Named", an esoteric subculture which her Totally Trans podcast describes as a "trans magic art-cult".

== Selected works ==
- Short, Ada-Rhodes. "Autonomous Decision Making Facing Uncertainty, Risk, and Complexity". Oregon State University. Retrieved 14 May 2021.
- Hemphill, Ryan, Kevyn Young, Maxwell Harris, A. Short, and Douglas L. Van Bossuyt. "Hybrid Additive Manufacturing Method."
- Short, A.R., and Douglas Lee Van Bossuyt. "Rerouting failure flows using logic blocks in functional models for improved system robustness: failure flow decision functions." In DS 80-6 Proceedings of the 20th International Conference on Engineering Design (ICED 15) Vol 6: Design Methods and Tools-Part 2 Milan, Italy, 27–30.07. 15, pp. 031–040. 2015.
- Short, Ada-Rhodes, Ann D. Lai, and Douglas L. Van Bossuyt. "Conceptual design of sacrificial sub-systems: failure flow decision functions." Research in Engineering Design 29, no. 1 (2018): 23–38.
- Short, A.R., and Douglas L. Van Bossuyt. "Risk attitude informed route planning in a simulated planetary rover." In International Design Engineering Technical Conferences and Computers and Information in Engineering Conference, vol. 57052, p. V01BT02A048. American Society of Mechanical Engineers, 2015.
