= Fort Collins High School =

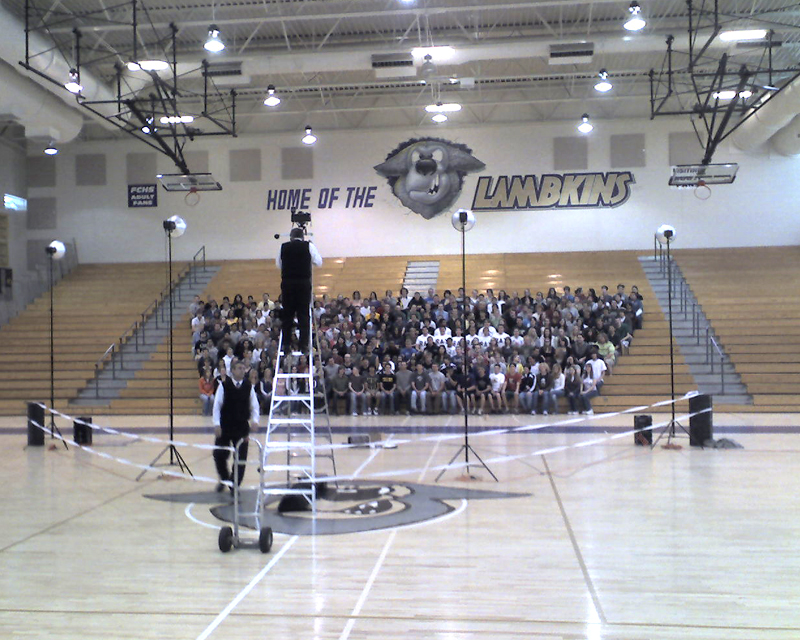
- The gymnasium at Fort Collins High School in 2009.

Location
- 3400 Lambkin Way; Fort Collins, Colorado 80525; United States; 40°32′24″N 105°02′14″W

Information
- Type: Public high school
- Motto: Home of the Champions/Where excellence is expected
- Established: c. 1890
- School district: Poudre School District
- CEEB code: 060590
- Principal: Dr. Jennifer Roth
- Staff: 112.33 (FTE)
- Grades: 9-12
- Enrollment: 1,902 (2023-2024)
- Student to teacher ratio: 16.93
- Campus size: 0.18 by 0.14 square miles (0.47 km^{2} × 0.36 km^{2}); 285,000 square feet (26,500 m^{2})
- Colors: Purple, gold, silver
- Athletics: 5A
- Athletics conference: Front Range League
- Mascot: Lambkin
- Newspaper: Spilled Ink
- Website: fch.psdschools.org

Fort Collins High School is a public senior high school located in Fort Collins, Colorado. It is one of six comprehensive public senior high schools in the Poudre School District. The school colors are purple and gold, and its mascot is the Lambkin. The school serves approximately 1,859 students and has a staff of about 130.

== History ==
Fort Collins High School was established in 1890. Classes were originally held on the second floor of the old Franklin Grade School at the corner of West Mountain and Howes Street. Almost 40 students were in the first classes at the school. By 1903, the need for a new building was apparent. At this time, the high school was moved to a new building on Meldrum Street, where the present Lincoln Center stands. Additions were made to this building in 1915 and 1921. In 1924, a new building which currently stands at 1400 Remington Street was constructed. Classes were held in this building from 1925 to 1995. In 1953, a large gymnasium was built on the north side of the building. A science addition was added to the south end in the mid-1980s. This building now serves as the Colorado State University Center for Performing Arts.

Due to increasing student numbers, a new Fort Collins High School was built at the corner of Horsetooth and Timberline Roads at 3400 Lambkin Way, and opened in the fall of 1995. Approximately 35,000 students have graduated since the first class of 1893.

== School culture ==
Each year, Fort Collins High School students host Spread the Love Week, which is designed to make each student feel included. During the 2015-16 school year, students dedicated the week to raising enough money to grant the wish of a local child with a terminal illness through the Make-a-Wish Foundation. To foster a community spirit, the school also offers service learning classes, including a special Give Next class, in which students practice philanthropy to local nonprofit organizations.

The school offers one of the top track and field programs in the state of Colorado, winning 24 state championships and three national championships since its inception in 1912.

== Notable alumni ==
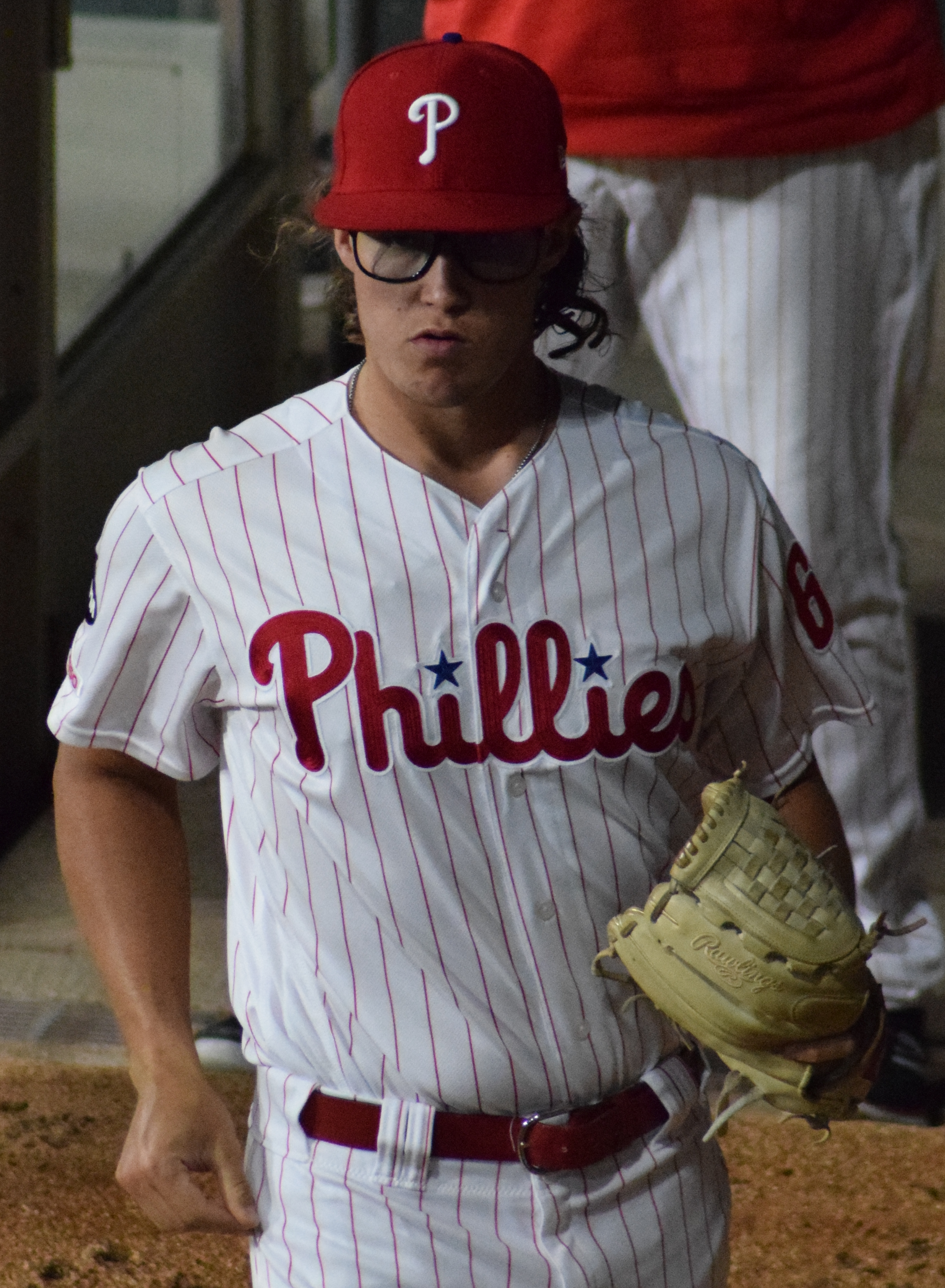
MLB player JD Hammer graduated from Fort Collins High School in 2012

- Wayne Allard (class of 1963) – U.S. Representative from 1991 to 1997 and United States Senator from 1997 to 2009
- Michele Carey – actress (El Dorado, Dirty Dingus Magee, Live a Little, Love a Little)
- Lauren Gregory (class of 2017) – ultra trail runner
- JD Hammer (class of 2012) – former Major League Baseball pitcher for the Philadelphia Phillies
- Dorothy Metcalf-Lindenburger (class of 1993) – former astronaut (STS-131)
- John Paragon (class of 1973) – actor (Pee-wee's Playhouse, Seinfeld, Saturday Night Live) and comedian (The Groundlings).
- Rachael Rudel (class of 2013) – distance runner
- Wilbur White (class of 1931) – professional football player
- Ada-Rhodes Wish – trans activist, roboticist, and assistant professor at University of Nebraska Omaha
