= List of new members of the 93rd United States Congress =

The 93rd United States Congress began on January 3, 1973. There were 11 new senators (six Democrats, five Republicans) and 68 new representatives (26 Democrats, 42 Republicans), as well as three new delegates (all Democrats), at the start of the first session. Additionally, seven senators (four Democrats, three Republicans) and 10 representatives (seven Democrats, three Republicans) took office on various dates in order to fill vacancies during the 93rd Congress before it ended on January 3, 1975.

Due to redistricting after the 1970 census, 17 representatives were elected from newly established congressional districts.

== Senate ==
=== Took office January 3, 1973 ===
State	Image	Senator	Seniority	Switched party	Prior background	Birth year	Ref
Colorado		Floyd Haskell (D)	9th (98th overall)	Yes; Defeated Gordon Allott (R)	Colorado House of Representatives; U.S. Army Major	1916	
Delaware		Joe Biden (D)	11th (100th overall)	Yes; Defeated J. Caleb Boggs (R)	New Castle County Council	1942	
Idaho		James A. McClure (R)	3rd (92nd overall)	No; Open seat; replaced Len Jordan (R)	U.S. House of Representatives (Note: Elected to the 90th Congress, serving from 1967 to 1973 in Idaho's 1st district.); Idaho Senate; U.S. Navy	1924	
Iowa		Dick Clark (D)	8th (97th overall)	Yes; Defeated Jack Miller (R)	Assistant to Congressman John Culver; Professor; U.S. Army	1928	
Kentucky (Class 2)		Walter Dee Huddleston (D)	7th (96th overall)	Yes; Open seat; replaced John Sherman Cooper (R)	Kentucky Senate; U.S. Army	1926	
Maine		William Hathaway (D)	1st (90th overall)	Yes; Defeated Margaret Chase Smith (R)	U.S. House of Representatives (Note: Elected to the 89th Congress, serving from 1965 to 1973 in Maine's 2nd district.); U.S. Army Air Corps	1924	
New Mexico		Pete Domenici (R)	10th (99th overall)	Yes; Open seat; replaced Clinton Anderson (D)	Mayor of Albuquerque	1932	
North Carolina		Jesse Helms (R)	6th (95th overall)	Yes; Replaced B. Everett Jordan (D), who was defeated in a primary	Capitol Broadcasting Company; Raleigh City Council; U.S. Navy	1921	
Oklahoma		Dewey F. Bartlett (R)	5th (94th overall)	Yes; Open seat; replaced Fred R. Harris (D)	Governor of Oklahoma; Oklahoma Senate; U.S. Marine Corps Captain	1919	
South Dakota		James Abourezk (D)	4th (93rd overall)	Yes; Open seat; replaced Karl Mundt (R)	U.S. House of Representatives (Note: Elected to the 92nd Congress, serving from 1971 to 1973 in South Dakota's 2nd district.); U.S. Navy	1931	
Virginia		William L. Scott (R)	2nd (91st overall)	Yes; Defeated William Spong Jr. (D)	U.S. House of Representatives (Note: Elected to the 90th Congress, serving from 1967 to 1973 in Virginia's 8th district.)	1915	

=== Took office during the 93rd Congress ===
State	Image	Senator	Took office	Switched party	Prior background	Birth year	Ref
Ohio		Howard Metzenbaum (D)	January 4, 1974	Yes; Appointed; replaced William B. Saxbe (R)	Ohio Senate; Ohio House of Representatives	1917	
Nevada		Paul Laxalt (R)	December 18, 1974	Yes; Open seat; replaced Alan Bible (D)	Governor of Nevada; Lieutenant Governor of Nevada; Ormsby County District Attorney; U.S. Army	1922	
Utah		Jake Garn (R)	December 21, 1974	No; Open seat; replaced Wallace F. Bennett (R)	Mayor of Salt Lake City; Utah Air National Guard	1932	
Ohio		John Glenn (D)	December 24, 1974	No; Defeated Howard Metzenbaum (D) in a primary	NASA astronaut U.S. Marine Corps Colonel	1921	
Kentucky (Class 3)		Wendell Ford (D)	December 28, 1974	Yes; Defeated Marlow Cook (R)	Governor of Kentucky; Lieutenant Governor of Kentucky; Kentucky Senate; Kentucky Army National Guard	1924	
New Hampshire		Louis C. Wyman (R)	December 31, 1974	No; Appointed; replaced Norris Cotton (R)	U.S. House of Representatives (Note: Elected to the 88th Congress, serving from 1963 to 1965 in New Hampshire's 1st district; elected again to the 90th Congress, serving from 1967 to 1974.); Attorney General of New Hampshire; U.S. Navy Lieutenant	1917	
Florida		Richard Stone (D)	January 1, 1975	Yes; Open seat; replaced Edward Gurney (R)	Secretary of State of Florida; Florida Senate; Miami City Attorney	1928	

== House of Representatives ==
=== Took office January 3, 1973 ===
District	Representative	Switched party	Prior background	Birth year	Ref
Arizona 4	John Conlan (R)	New seat	State Senator	1930	
Arkansas 4	Ray Thornton (D)	No	Arkansas Attorney General	1928	
California 8	Pete Stark (D)	No	Bank executive	1931	
California 11	Leo Ryan (D)	New seat	State Assemblyman	1925	
California 20	Carlos Moorhead (R)	No	State Assemblyman	1922	
California 36	William M. Ketchum (R)	New seat	State Assemblyman	1921	
California 37	Yvonne Brathwaite Burke (D)	New seat	State Assemblywoman	1932	
California 38	George Brown Jr. (D)	New seat	U.S. Representative (Note: Previously elected to the 88th Congress, serving from 1963 to 1971 in California's 29th district.)	1920	
California 39	Andrew J. Hinshaw (R)	No	County Assessor	1923	
California 42	Clair Burgener (R)	New seat	State Senator	1921	
Colorado 1	Pat Schroeder (D)	Yes	Lawyer	1940	
Colorado 4	James Paul Johnson (R)	Yes	School Board Member	1930	
Colorado 5	William L. Armstrong (R)	New seat	State Senate President	1937	
Connecticut 5	Ronald A. Sarasin (R)	Yes	State Representative	1934	
Florida 5	Bill Gunter (D)	New seat	State Senator	1934	
Florida 10	Skip Bafalis (R)	New seat	State Senator	1929	
Florida 13	William Lehman (D)	New seat	School Board Member	1913	
Georgia 1	Bo Ginn (D)	No	Congressional aide	1934	
Georgia 5	Andrew Young (D)	Yes	Director of the SCLC	1932	
Idaho 1	Steve Symms (R)	No	Farmer	1938	
Illinois 3	Robert P. Hanrahan (R)	New seat	County School Superintendent	1934	
Illinois 10	Samuel H. Young (R)	Yes	Lawyer	1922	
Illinois 17	George M. O'Brien (R)	New seat	State Representative	1917	
Illinois 21	Ed Madigan (R)	No	State Representative	1936	
Indiana 11	William H. Hudnut III (R)	Yes	Ordained minister	1932	
Iowa 1	Edward Mezvinsky (D)	Yes	State Representative	1937	
Kentucky 6	John B. Breckinridge (D)	No	Attorney General of Kentucky	1913	
Louisiana 3	Dave Treen (R)	Yes	State Party Committeeman	1928	
Louisiana 8	Gillis William Long (D)	No	U.S. Representative (Note: Previously elected to the 88th Congress, serving from 1963 to 1965.)	1923	
Maine 2	William Cohen (R)	Yes	Mayor of Bangor	1940	
Maryland 4	Marjorie Holt (R)	Yes	Circuit Court Judge	1920	
Massachusetts 5	Paul W. Cronin (R)	No	State Representative	1938	
Massachusetts 9	Joe Moakley (D)	No (Note: Moakley was elected as an independent but joined the Democratic Party before the first session.)	City Councillor	1927	
Massachusetts 12	Gerry Studds (D)	Yes	U.S. Foreign Service officer	1937	
Michigan 18	Robert J. Huber (R)	New seat	State Senator	1922	
Mississippi 2	David R. Bowen (D)	No	USCC official	1932	
Mississippi 4	Thad Cochran (R)	Yes	Lawyer	1937	
Mississippi 5	Trent Lott (R)	Yes	Congressional aide	1941	
Missouri 6	Jerry Litton (D)	No	Rancher	1937	
Missouri 7	Gene Taylor (R)	No	Mayor of Sarcoxie	1928	
Nevada at-large	David Towell (R)	Yes	Real estate broker	1937	
New Jersey 12	Matthew J. Rinaldo (R)	No	State Senator	1931	
New Jersey 13	Joseph J. Maraziti (R)	New seat	State Senator	1912	
New York 3	Angelo D. Roncallo (R)	New seat	County Comptroller	1927	
New York 16	Elizabeth Holtzman (D)	No	Assistant to Mayor John Lindsay	1941	
New York 26	Benjamin Gilman (R)	Yes	State Assemblyman	1922	
New York 31	Donald J. Mitchell (R)	No	State Assemblyman	1923	
New York 33	William F. Walsh (R)	No	Mayor of Syracuse	1912	
North Carolina 4	Ike Franklin Andrews (D)	No	State Representative	1925	
North Carolina 7	Charlie Rose (D)	No	Prosecutor	1939	
North Carolina 9	James G. Martin (R)	No	County Commissioner	1935	
Ohio 4	Tennyson Guyer (R)	No	State Senator	1912	
Ohio 16	Ralph Regula (R)	No	State Senator	1924	
Oklahoma 1	James R. Jones (D)	Yes	White House Chief of Staff	1939	
Oklahoma 2	Clem McSpadden (D)	No	State Senator	1925	
Pennsylvania 9	Bud Shuster (R)	New seat	Business owner	1932	
South Carolina 6	Edward Lunn Young (R)	Yes	State Representative	1920	
South Dakota 2	James Abdnor (R)	Yes	Lieutenant Governor of South Dakota	1923	
Tennessee 6	Robin Beard (R)	Yes	U.S. Marine Corps Reserve	1939	
Texas 2	Charlie Wilson (D)	No	State Senator	1933	
Texas 5	Alan Steelman (R)	Yes	Business executive	1942	
Texas 18	Barbara Jordan (D)	New seat	State Senator	1936	
Texas 24	Dale Milford (D)	New seat	Meteorologist	1926	
Utah 2	Wayne Owens (D)	Yes	Congressional staffer	1937	
Virginia 4	Robert Daniel (R)	Yes	CIA officer	1936	
Virginia 8	Stanford Parris (R)	No	State Delegate	1929	
Washington 1	Joel Pritchard (R)	No	State Senator	1925	
Wisconsin 8	Harold Vernon Froehlich (R)	No	State Assembly Speaker	1932	

==== Non-voting members ====
District	Delegate	Switched party	Prior background	Birth year	Ref
Guam at-large	Antonio Borja Won Pat (D)	New seat	Territorial Legislative Speaker	1908	
Puerto Rico at-large	Jaime Benítez Rexach (PD/D)	Yes/No (Note: The previous delegate, Jorge Luis Córdova, was registered as New Progressive/Democratic.)	University President	1908	
U.S. Virgin Islands at-large	Ron de Lugo (D)	New seat	Territorial Legislator	1930	

=== Took office during the 95th Congress ===
District	Representative	Took office	Switched party	Prior background	Birth year	Ref
Alaska at-large	Don Young (R)	March 6, 1973	Yes	State Senator	1933	
Louisiana 2	Lindy Boggs (D)	March 20, 1973	No	Teacher	1916	
Illinois 7	Cardiss Collins (D)	June 5, 1973	No	Accountant	1931	
Maryland 1	Robert Bauman (R)	August 21, 1973	No	State Senator	1937	
Pennsylvania 12	John Murtha (D)	February 5, 1974	Yes	State Representative	1932	
Michigan 5	Richard Vander Veen (D)	February 18, 1974	Yes	School Board Member	1922	
California 13	Robert J. Lagomarsino (R)	March 5, 1974	No	State Senator	1926	
Ohio 1	Tom Luken (D)	March 5, 1974	Yes	Mayor of Cincinnati	1925	
Michigan 8	J. Bob Traxler (D)	April 23, 1974	Yes	State Representative	1931	
California 6	John Burton (D)	June 4, 1974	Yes	State Assemblyman	1932	

== See also ==
- List of United States representatives in the 93rd Congress
- List of United States senators in the 93rd Congress

== Notes ==
Preceded by New members of the 92nd Congress	New members of the 93rd Congress; 1973–1975	Succeeded by New members of the 94th Congress
