= William L. Armstrong Award =

The William L. Armstrong Award is an award presented annually since 2016 by the Centennial Institute at Colorado Christian University. It has been presented during the Western Conservative Summit, except in 2024, when the Summit was cancelled and the award was given at a separate dinner event. The award is named for former U.S. Senator William L. Armstrong (R-CO), who also served as president of the University from 2006 to 2016. It has been given to national conservative leaders who the University considers role models for its students and who have "made a difference in America's culture through business, politics, or education." The recipient has been a keynote speaker at the event every year except 2026, when the award was given posthumously to Edwin J. Feulner, who died July 18, 2025. That award was accepted on behalf of his family by his son, E.J. Feulner, at a dinner keynoted by former Vice President Mike Pence.

== Recipients ==
- 2016: Dennis Prager, conservative talk show host and founder of Prager University
- 2017: James Dobson, Focus on the Family and “Family Talk” founder
- 2018: Edwin Meese, former U.S. Attorney General and Counselor to President Ronald Reagan
- 2019: Robert P. George, Princeton University Professor
- 2020: Steve Green, President of Hobby Lobby and Chairman of the Museum of the Bible
- 2021: Kay Coles James, Gloucester Institute founder, and former Heritage Foundation president
- 2022: Cal Thomas, syndicated columnist, author, and radio commentator
- 2023: Kristen Waggoner, president and CEO of Alliance Defending Freedom
- 2024: Robert Woodson, civil rights activist and founder of the Woodson Center
- 2026: Edwin Feulner, co-founder and longtime president of the Heritage Foundation
