= List of United States representatives in the 93rd Congress =

This is a complete list of United States representatives during the 93rd United States Congress listed by seniority.

As an historical article, the districts and party affiliations listed reflect those during the 93rd Congress (January 3, 1973 – January 3, 1975). Seats and party affiliations on similar lists for other congresses will be different for certain members.

Seniority depends on the date on which members were sworn into office. Since many members are sworn in on the same day, subsequent ranking is based on previous congressional service of the individual and then by alphabetical order by the last name of the representative.

Committee chairmanship in the House is often associated with seniority. However, party leadership is typically not associated with seniority.

Note: The "*" indicates that the representative/delegate may have served one or more non-consecutive terms while in the House of Representatives of the United States Congress.

== U.S. House seniority list ==
U.S. House seniority
Rank	Representative	Party	District	Seniority date (Previous service, if any)	No.# of term(s)	Notes
1	Wright Patman	D	TX-01	March 4, 1929	23rd term	Dean of the House
2	Leslie C. Arends	R	IL-15	January 3, 1935	20th term	Resigned on December 31, 1974.
3	George H. Mahon	D	TX-19	January 3, 1935	20th term	
4	William R. Poage	D	TX-11	January 3, 1937	19th term	
5	Wilbur Mills	D	AR-02	January 3, 1939	18th term	
6	Felix Edward Hébert	D	LA-01	January 3, 1941	17th term	
7	Jamie Whitten	D	MS-01	November 4, 1941	17th term	
8	O. C. Fisher	D	TX-21	January 3, 1943	16th term	Resigned on December 31, 1974.
9	Chester E. Holifield	D	CA-19	January 3, 1943	16th term	Resigned on December 31, 1974.
10	Ray Madden	D	IN-01	January 3, 1943	16th term	
11	John J. Rooney	D	NY-14	June 6, 1944	16th term	Resigned on December 31, 1974.
12	Thomas E. Morgan	D	PA-22	January 3, 1945	15th term	
13	Charles Melvin Price	D	IL-23	January 3, 1945	15th term	
14	Robert L. F. Sikes	D	FL-01	January 3, 1945; Previous service, 1941–1944.	17th term*	
15	Olin E. Teague	D	TX-06	August 24, 1946	15th term	
16	Carl Albert	D	OK-03	January 3, 1947	14th term	
17	John Blatnik	D	MN-08	January 3, 1947	14th term	Resigned on December 31, 1974.
18	Omar Burleson	D	TX-17	January 3, 1947	14th term	
19	Harold Donohue	D	MA-03	January 3, 1947	14th term	Resigned on December 31, 1974.
20	Joe L. Evins	D	TN-04	January 3, 1947	14th term	
21	Otto Passman	D	LA-05	January 3, 1947	14th term	
22	Robert E. Jones, Jr.	D	AL-05	January 28, 1947	14th term	
23	William A. Barrett	D	PA-01	January 3, 1949; Previous service, 1945–1947.	14th term*	
24	Charles Edward Bennett	D	FL-03	January 3, 1949	13th term	
25	Richard Walker Bolling	D	MO-05	January 3, 1949	13th term	
26	James J. Delaney	D	NY-09	January 3, 1949; Previous service, 1945–1947.	14th term*	
27	Gerald Ford	R	MI-05	January 3, 1949	13th term	Resigned on December 6, 1973.
28	H. R. Gross	R	IA-03	January 3, 1949	13th term	Left the House in 1975.
29	Wayne Hays	D	OH-18	January 3, 1949	13th term	
30	Carl D. Perkins	D	KY-07	January 3, 1949	13th term	
31	Peter W. Rodino	D	NJ-10	January 3, 1949	13th term	
32	Harley Orrin Staggers	D	WV-02	January 3, 1949	13th term	
33	Tom Steed	D	OK-04	January 3, 1949	13th term	
34	Clement J. Zablocki	D	WI-04	January 3, 1949	13th term	
35	John P. Saylor	R	PA-12	September 13, 1949	13th term	Died on October 28, 1973.
36	William B. Widnall	R	NJ-07	February 6, 1950	13th term	Resigned on December 31, 1974.
37	William G. Bray	R	IN-06	January 3, 1951	12th term	Left the House in 1975.
38	William Jennings Bryan Dorn	D	SC-03	January 3, 1951; Previous service, 1947–1949.	13th term*	Resigned on December 31, 1974.
39	John Jarman	D	OK-05	January 3, 1951	12th term	
40	John C. Kluczynski	D	IL-05	January 3, 1951	12th term	
41	Edward Boland	D	MA-02	January 3, 1953	11th term	
42	Jack Brooks	D	TX-09	January 3, 1953	11th term	
43	Joel Broyhill	R	VA-10	January 3, 1953	11th term	Resigned on December 31, 1974.
44	Elford Albin Cederberg	R	MI-10	January 3, 1953	11th term	
45	Lawrence H. Fountain	D	NC-02	January 3, 1953	11th term	
46	Peter Frelinghuysen, Jr.	R	NJ-05	January 3, 1953	11th term	Left the House in 1975.
47	Charles S. Gubser	R	CA-10	January 3, 1953	11th term	Resigned on December 31, 1974.
48	James A. Haley	D	FL-08	January 3, 1953	11th term	
49	Craig Hosmer	R	CA-32	January 3, 1953	11th term	Resigned on December 31, 1974.
50	Phillip M. Landrum	D	GA-09	January 3, 1953	11th term	
51	William S. Mailliard	R	CA-06	January 3, 1953	11th term	Resigned on March 5, 1974.
52	John E. Moss	D	CA-03	January 3, 1953	11th term	
53	Tip O'Neill	D	MA-08	January 3, 1953	11th term	
54	John J. Rhodes	R	AZ-01	January 3, 1953	11th term	
55	Leonor Sullivan	D	MO-03	January 3, 1953	11th term	
56	Bob Wilson	R	CA-40	January 3, 1953	11th term	
57	William Natcher	D	KY-02	August 1, 1953	11th term	
58	John James Flynt, Jr.	D	GA-06	November 2, 1954	11th term	
59	Thomas W. L. Ashley	D	OH-09	January 3, 1955	10th term	
60	Frank M. Clark	D	PA-25	January 3, 1955	10th term	Resigned on December 31, 1974.
61	Charles Diggs	D	MI-13	January 3, 1955	10th term	
62	Dante Fascell	D	FL-15	January 3, 1955	10th term	
63	Daniel J. Flood	D	PA-11	January 3, 1955; Previous service, 1945–1947 and 1949–1953.	13th term**	
64	Kenneth J. Gray	D	IL-24	January 3, 1955	10th term	Resigned on December 31, 1974.
65	Edith Green	D	OR-03	January 3, 1955	10th term	Resigned on December 31, 1974.
66	Martha Griffiths	D	MI-17	January 3, 1955	10th term	Resigned on December 31, 1974.
67	Torbert Macdonald	D	MA-07	January 3, 1955	10th term	
68	William Edwin Minshall, Jr.	R	OH-23	January 3, 1955	10th term	Resigned on December 31, 1974.
69	Henry S. Reuss	D	WI-05	January 3, 1955	10th term	
70	Bernice F. Sisk	D	CA-16	January 3, 1955	10th term	
71	Charles M. Teague	R	CA-13	January 3, 1955	10th term	Died on January 1, 1974.
72	Frank Thompson	D	NJ-04	January 3, 1955	10th term	
73	Charles Vanik	D	OH-22	January 3, 1955	10th term	
74	Jim Wright	D	TX-12	January 3, 1955	10th term	
75	Paul Rogers	D	FL-11	January 11, 1955	10th term	
76	John Dingell	D	MI-16	December 13, 1955	10th term	
77	William Broomfield	R	MI-19	January 3, 1957	9th term	
78	Charles E. Chamberlain	R	MI-06	January 3, 1957	9th term	Resigned on December 31, 1974.
79	Harold R. Collier	R	IL-06	January 3, 1957	9th term	Left the House in 1975.
80	John J. McFall	D	CA-15	January 3, 1957	9th term	
81	Robert Michel	R	IL-18	January 3, 1957	9th term	
82	Al Ullman	D	OR-02	January 3, 1957	9th term	
83	John Andrew Young	D	TX-14	January 3, 1957	9th term	
84	Howard W. Robison	R	NY-27	January 14, 1958	9th term	Left the House in 1975.
85	John Herman Dent	D	PA-21	January 21, 1958	9th term	
86	Al Quie	R	MN-01	February 18, 1958	9th term	
87	Robert N.C. Nix, Sr.	D	PA-02	May 20, 1958	9th term	
88	John Brademas	D	IN-03	January 3, 1959	8th term	
89	James A. Burke	D	MA-11	January 3, 1959	8th term	
90	Robert R. Casey	D	TX-22	January 3, 1959	8th term	
91	Silvio O. Conte	R	MA-01	January 3, 1959	8th term	
92	Dominick V. Daniels	D	NJ-14	January 3, 1959	8th term	
93	Ed Derwinski	R	IL-04	January 3, 1959	8th term	
94	Samuel L. Devine	R	OH-12	January 3, 1959	8th term	
95	Thomas N. Downing	D	VA-01	January 3, 1959	8th term	
96	Thaddeus J. Dulski	D	NY-37	January 3, 1959	8th term	Resigned on December 31, 1974.
97	Robert Giaimo	D	CT-03	January 3, 1959	8th term	
98	Ken Hechler	D	WV-04	January 3, 1959	8th term	
99	Harold T. Johnson	D	CA-02	January 3, 1959	8th term	
100	Robert Kastenmeier	D	WI-02	January 3, 1959	8th term	
101	Joseph Karth	D	MN-04	January 3, 1959	8th term	
102	Del Latta	R	OH-05	January 3, 1959	8th term	
103	William S. Moorhead	D	PA-14	January 3, 1959	8th term	
104	Ancher Nelsen	R	MN-02	January 3, 1959	8th term	Resigned on December 31, 1974.
105	James G. O'Hara	D	MI-12	January 3, 1959	8th term	
106	Dan Rostenkowski	D	IL-08	January 3, 1959	8th term	
107	George E. Shipley	D	IL-22	January 3, 1959	8th term	
108	John M. Slack, Jr.	D	WV-03	January 3, 1959	8th term	
109	Neal Smith	D	IA-04	January 3, 1959	8th term	
110	Samuel S. Stratton	D	NY-28	January 3, 1959	8th term	
111	Frank Stubblefield	D	KY-01	January 3, 1959	8th term	Resigned on December 31, 1974.
112	William J. Randall	D	MO-04	March 3, 1959	8th term	
113	Herman T. Schneebeli	R	PA-17	April 26, 1960	8th term	
114	Roy A. Taylor	D	NC-11	June 25, 1960	8th term	
115	Julia Butler Hansen	D	WA-03	November 8, 1960	8th term	Resigned on December 31, 1974.
116	Joseph Patrick Addabbo	D	NY-07	January 3, 1961	7th term	
117	John B. Anderson	R	IL-16	January 3, 1961	7th term	
118	John M. Ashbrook	R	OH-17	January 3, 1961	7th term	
119	Alphonzo E. Bell, Jr.	R	CA-28	January 3, 1961	7th term	
120	Hugh Carey	D	NY-15	January 3, 1961	7th term	Resigned on December 31, 1974.
121	Donald D. Clancy	R	OH-02	January 3, 1961	7th term	
122	James C. Corman	D	CA-22	January 3, 1961	7th term	
123	John W. Davis	D	GA-07	January 3, 1961	7th term	Left the House in 1975.
124	Paul Findley	R	IL-20	January 3, 1961	7th term	
125	Fernand St. Germain	D	RI-01	January 3, 1961	7th term	
126	Bill Harsha	R	OH-06	January 3, 1961	7th term	
127	R. James Harvey	R	MI-08	January 3, 1961	7th term	Resigned on January 31, 1974.
128	David N. Henderson	D	NC-03	January 3, 1961	7th term	
129	Richard Howard Ichord, Jr.	D	MO-08	January 3, 1961	7th term	
130	Carleton J. King	R	NY-29	January 3, 1961	7th term	Resigned on December 31, 1974.
131	David Martin	D	NE-03	January 3, 1961	7th term	Resigned on December 31, 1974.
132	Charles Adams Mosher	R	OH-13	January 3, 1961	7th term	
133	Otis G. Pike	D	NY-01	January 3, 1961	7th term	
134	Garner E. Shriver	R	KS-04	January 3, 1961	7th term	
135	Robert Grier Stephens, Jr.	D	GA-10	January 3, 1961	7th term	
136	Vernon Wallace Thomson	R	WI-03	January 3, 1961	7th term	Resigned on December 31, 1974.
137	Mo Udall	D	AZ-02	May 2, 1961	7th term	
138	Henry B. González	D	TX-20	November 4, 1961	7th term	
139	Lucien N. Nedzi	D	MI-14	November 7, 1961	7th term	
140	Joe Waggonner	D	LA-04	December 19, 1961	7th term	
141	Ray Roberts	D	TX-04	January 30, 1962	7th term	
142	Benjamin S. Rosenthal	D	NY-08	February 20, 1962	7th term	
143	Jim Broyhill	R	NC-10	January 3, 1963	6th term	
144	James Colgate Cleveland	R	NH-02	January 3, 1963	6th term	
145	Lionel Van Deerlin	D	CA-41	January 3, 1963	6th term	
146	Don Edwards	D	CA-09	January 3, 1963	6th term	
147	Donald M. Fraser	D	MN-05	January 3, 1963	6th term	
148	Richard Fulton	D	TN-05	January 3, 1963	6th term	
149	Don Fuqua	D	FL-02	January 3, 1963	6th term	
150	Sam Gibbons	D	FL-07	January 3, 1963	6th term	
151	James R. Grover	R	NY-02	January 3, 1963	6th term	Left the House in 1975.
152	Richard T. Hanna	D	CA-34	January 3, 1963	6th term	Resigned on December 31, 1974.
153	Augustus F. Hawkins	D	CA-21	January 3, 1963	6th term	
154	Frank Horton	R	NY-34	January 3, 1963	6th term	
155	J. Edward Hutchinson	R	MI-04	January 3, 1963	6th term	
156	Robert L. Leggett	D	CA-04	January 3, 1963	6th term	
157	Clarence Long	D	MD-02	January 3, 1963	6th term	
158	Spark Matsunaga	D	HI-01	January 3, 1963	6th term	
159	Robert McClory	R	IL-13	January 3, 1963	6th term	
160	Joseph McDade	R	PA-10	January 3, 1963	6th term	
161	Joseph Minish	D	NJ-11	January 3, 1963	6th term	
162	John M. Murphy	D	NY-17	January 3, 1963	6th term	
163	Edward J. Patten	D	NJ-15	January 3, 1963	6th term	
164	Claude Pepper	D	FL-14	January 3, 1963	6th term	
165	Jimmy Quillen	R	TN-01	January 3, 1963	6th term	
166	Ogden Reid	D	NY-24	January 3, 1963	6th term	Left the House in 1975.
167	Edward R. Roybal	D	CA-30	January 3, 1963	6th term	
168	Joe Skubitz	R	KS-05	January 3, 1963	6th term	
169	Burt L. Talcott	R	CA-12	January 3, 1963	6th term	
170	Charles H. Wilson	D	CA-31	January 3, 1963	6th term	
171	John W. Wydler	R	NY-05	January 3, 1963	6th term	
172	Don H. Clausen	R	CA-01	January 22, 1963	6th term	
173	Del M. Clawson	R	CA-23	June 11, 1963	6th term	
174	Fred B. Rooney	D	PA-15	July 30, 1963	6th term	
175	Mark Andrews	R	ND	October 22, 1963	6th term	
176	Albert W. Johnson	R	PA-23	November 5, 1963	6th term	
177	J. J. Pickle	D	TX-10	December 21, 1963	6th term	
178	Phillip Burton	D	CA-05	February 18, 1964	6th term	
179	William J. Green, III	D	PA-03	April 28, 1964	6th term	
180	William L. Hungate	D	MO-09	November 3, 1964	6th term	
181	Thomas S. Gettys	D	SC-05	November 3, 1964	6th term	Resigned on December 31, 1974.
182	Wendell Wyatt	R	OR-01	November 3, 1964	6th term	Left the House in 1975.
183	Brock Adams	D	WA-07	January 3, 1965	5th term	
184	Frank Annunzio	D	IL-11	January 3, 1965	5th term	
185	Jonathan Brewster Bingham	D	NY-22	January 3, 1965	5th term	
186	John Hall Buchanan, Jr.	R	AL-06	January 3, 1965	5th term	
187	Tim Lee Carter	R	KY-05	January 3, 1965	5th term	
188	Barber Conable	R	NY-35	January 3, 1965	5th term	
189	John Conyers	D	MI-01	January 3, 1965	5th term	
190	John Culver	D	IA-02	January 3, 1965	5th term	Left the House in 1975.
191	Glenn Robert Davis	R	WI-09	January 3, 1965; Previous service, 1947–1957.	10th term*	Resigned on December 31, 1974.
192	Bill Dickinson	R	AL-02	January 3, 1965	5th term	
193	John Duncan, Sr.	R	TN-02	January 3, 1965	5th term	
194	Jack Edwards	R	AL-01	January 3, 1965	5th term	
195	John N. Erlenborn	R	IL-14	January 3, 1965	5th term	
196	Frank Evans	D	CO-03	January 3, 1965	5th term	
197	Tom Foley	D	WA-05	January 3, 1965	5th term	
198	William Ford	D	MI-15	January 3, 1965	5th term	
199	Kika De la Garza	D	TX-15	January 3, 1965	5th term	
200	Lee Hamilton	D	IN-09	January 3, 1965	5th term	
201	James M. Hanley	D	NY-32	January 3, 1965	5th term	
202	Henry Helstoski	D	NJ-09	January 3, 1965	5th term	
203	Floyd Hicks	D	WA-06	January 3, 1965	5th term	
204	James J. Howard	D	NJ-03	January 3, 1965	5th term	
205	Robert C. McEwen	R	NY-30	January 3, 1965	5th term	
206	Lloyd Meeds	D	WA-02	January 3, 1965	5th term	
207	Patsy Mink	D	HI-02	January 3, 1965	5th term	
208	David E. Satterfield III	D	VA-03	January 3, 1965	5th term	
209	Henry P. Smith III	R	NY-36	January 3, 1965	5th term	Left the House in 1975.
210	J. William Stanton	R	OH-11	January 3, 1965	5th term	
211	Joseph P. Vigorito	D	PA-24	January 3, 1965	5th term	
212	Richard Crawford White	D	TX-16	January 3, 1965	5th term	
213	Lester L. Wolff	D	NY-06	January 3, 1965	5th term	
214	Sidney Yates	D	IL-09	January 3, 1965; Previous service, 1949–1963.	12th term*	
215	Clarence J. Brown, Jr.	R	OH-07	November 2, 1965	5th term	
216	Thomas M. Rees	D	CA-26	December 15, 1965	5th term	
217	Walter B. Jones, Sr.	D	NC-01	February 5, 1966	5th term	
218	Jerome R. Waldie	D	CA-14	June 7, 1966	5th term	Left the House in 1975.
219	Guy Vander Jagt	R	MI-09	November 8, 1966	5th term	
220	Tom Bevill	D	AL-04	January 3, 1967	4th term	
221	Edward G. Biester, Jr.	R	PA-08	January 3, 1967	4th term	
222	Benjamin B. Blackburn	R	GA-04	January 3, 1967	4th term	Left the House in 1975.
223	Jack Thomas Brinkley	D	GA-03	January 3, 1967	4th term	
224	Frank J. Brasco	D	NY-11	January 3, 1967	4th term	Left the House in 1975.
225	Donald G. Brotzman	R	CO-02	January 3, 1967; Previous service, 1963–1965.	5th term*	Left the House in 1975.
226	Garry E. Brown	R	MI-03	January 3, 1967	4th term	
227	J. Herbert Burke	R	FL-12	January 3, 1967	4th term	
228	John R. Dellenback	R	OR-04	January 3, 1967	4th term	Left the House in 1975.
229	Robert C. Eckhardt	D	TX-08	January 3, 1967	4th term	
230	Joshua Eilberg	D	PA-04	January 3, 1967	4th term	
231	Marvin L. Esch	R	MI-02	January 3, 1967	4th term	
232	Edwin Duing Eshleman	R	PA-16	January 3, 1967	4th term	
233	George Atlee Goodling	R	PA-19	January 3, 1967; Previous service, 1961–1965.	6th term*	Left the House in 1975.
234	Gilbert Gude	R	MD-08	January 3, 1967	4th term	
235	John Paul Hammerschmidt	R	AR-03	January 3, 1967	4th term	
236	Margaret Heckler	R	MA-10	January 3, 1967	4th term	
237	John E. Hunt	R	NJ-01	January 3, 1967	4th term	Left the House in 1975.
238	Abraham Kazen	D	TX-23	January 3, 1967	4th term	
239	Peter Kyros	D	ME-01	January 3, 1967	4th term	Left the House in 1975.
240	Dan Kuykendall	R	TN-08	January 3, 1967	4th term	Left the House in 1975.
241	Bob Mathias	R	CA-18	January 3, 1967	4th term	Left the House in 1975.
242	Wiley Mayne	R	IA-06	January 3, 1967	4th term	Left the House in 1975.
243	Clarence E. Miller	R	OH-10	January 3, 1967	4th term	
244	Sonny Montgomery	D	MS-03	January 3, 1967	4th term	
245	John Myers	R	IN-07	January 3, 1967	4th term	
246	Bill Nichols	D	AL-03	January 3, 1967	4th term	
247	Jerry Pettis	R	CA-33	January 3, 1967	4th term	
248	Bob Price	R	TX-13	January 3, 1967	4th term	Left the House in 1975.
249	Tom Railsback	R	IL-19	January 3, 1967	4th term	
250	John Rarick	D	LA-06	January 3, 1967	4th term	Left the House in 1975.
251	Donald W. Riegle, Jr.	R	MI-07	January 3, 1967	4th term	
252	Philip Ruppe	R	MI-11	January 3, 1967	4th term	
253	Charles W. Sandman, Jr.	R	NJ-02	January 3, 1967	4th term	
254	William J. Scherle	R	IA-05	January 3, 1967	4th term	Left the House in 1975.
255	Gene Snyder	R	KY-04	January 3, 1967; Previous service, 1963–1965.	5th term*	
256	Sam Steiger	R	AZ-03	January 3, 1967	4th term	
257	William A. Steiger	R	WI-06	January 3, 1967	4th term	
258	W. S. Stuckey, Jr.	D	GA-08	January 3, 1967	4th term	
259	William C. Wampler	R	VA-09	January 3, 1967; Previous service, 1953–1955.	5th term*	
260	Charles E. Wiggins	R	CA-25	January 3, 1967	4th term	
261	Lawrence G. Williams	R	PA-07	January 3, 1967	4th term	Left the House in 1975.
262	Larry Winn	R	KS-03	January 3, 1967	4th term	
263	Charles W. Whalen, Jr.	R	OH-03	January 3, 1967	4th term	
264	Chalmers Wylie	R	OH-15	January 3, 1967	4th term	
265	Louis C. Wyman	R	NH-01	January 3, 1967; Previous service, 1963–1965.	5th term*	Resigned on December 31, 1974.
266	Roger H. Zion	R	IN-08	January 3, 1967	4th term	Left the House in 1975.
267	John M. Zwach	R	MN-06	January 3, 1967	4th term	Left the House in 1975.
268	Robert Tiernan	D	RI-02	March 28, 1967	4th term	Left the House in 1975.
269	Pete McCloskey	R	CA-17	December 12, 1967	4th term	
270	Bertram L. Podell	D	NY-13	February 20, 1968	4th term	Left the House in 1975.
271	James M. Collins	R	TX-03	August 24, 1968	4th term	
272	Joseph M. Gaydos	D	PA-20	November 5, 1968	4th term	
273	Bill Alexander	D	AR-01	January 3, 1969	3rd term	
274	Glenn M. Anderson	D	CA-35	January 3, 1969	3rd term	
275	Mario Biaggi	D	NY-10	January 3, 1969	3rd term	
276	Bill Burlison	D	MO-10	January 3, 1969	3rd term	
277	John Newbold Camp	R	OK-06	January 3, 1969	3rd term	Left the House in 1975.
278	William V. Chappell, Jr.	D	FL-04	January 3, 1969	3rd term	
279	Shirley Chisholm	D	NY-12	January 3, 1969	3rd term	
280	Bill Clay	D	MO-01	January 3, 1969	3rd term	
281	Lawrence Coughlin	R	PA-13	January 3, 1969	3rd term	
282	Dan Daniel	D	VA-05	January 3, 1969	3rd term	
283	David W. Dennis	R	IN-10	January 3, 1969	3rd term	Left the House in 1975.
284	Hamilton Fish	R	NY-25	January 3, 1969	3rd term	
285	Walter Flowers	D	AL-07	January 3, 1969	3rd term	
286	Louis Frey, Jr.	R	FL-09	January 3, 1969	3rd term	
287	Orval H. Hansen	R	ID-02	January 3, 1969	3rd term	Left the House in 1975.
288	James F. Hastings	R	NY-39	January 3, 1969	3rd term	
289	Lawrence Hogan	R	MD-05	January 3, 1969	3rd term	Left the House in 1975.
290	Ed Koch	D	NY-18	January 3, 1969	3rd term	
291	Earl Landgrebe	R	IN-02	January 3, 1969	3rd term	Left the House in 1975.
292	Manuel Lujan, Jr.	R	NM-01	January 3, 1969	3rd term	
293	James Robert Mann	D	SC-04	January 3, 1969	3rd term	
294	Wilmer Mizell	R	NC-05	January 3, 1969	3rd term	Left the House in 1975.
295	Bob Mollohan	D	WV-01	January 3, 1969; Previous service, 1953–1957.	5th term*	
296	L. Richardson Preyer	D	NC-06	January 3, 1969	3rd term	
297	Earl B. Ruth	R	NC-08	January 3, 1969	3rd term	Left the House in 1975.
298	Keith Sebelius	R	KS-01	January 3, 1969	3rd term	
299	Louis Stokes	D	OH-21	January 3, 1969	3rd term	
300	James W. Symington	D	MO-02	January 3, 1969	3rd term	
301	G. William Whitehurst	R	VA-02	January 3, 1969	3rd term	
302	Gus Yatron	D	PA-06	January 3, 1969	3rd term	
303	Ed Jones	D	TN-07	March 25, 1969	3rd term	
304	Dave Obey	D	WI-07	April 1, 1969	3rd term	
305	Barry Goldwater, Jr.	R	CA-27	April 29, 1969	3rd term	
306	John Melcher	D	MT-02	June 24, 1969	3rd term	
307	Michael J. Harrington	D	MA-06	September 30, 1969	3rd term	
308	Robert A. Roe	D	NJ-08	November 4, 1969	3rd term	
309	Phil Crane	R	IL-12	November 25, 1969	3rd term	
310	John H. Rousselot	R	CA-24	June 30, 1970; Previous service, 1961–1963.	4th term*	
311	Charles J. Carney	D	OH-19	November 3, 1970	3rd term	
312	Edwin B. Forsythe	R	NJ-06	November 3, 1970	3rd term	
313	Robert H. Steele	R	CT-02	November 3, 1970	3rd term	Left the House in 1975.
314	John H. Ware III	R	PA-05	November 3, 1970	3rd term	Left the House in 1975.
315	Bella Abzug	D	NY-20	January 3, 1971	2nd term	
316	Bill Archer	R	TX-07	January 3, 1971	2nd term	
317	Les Aspin	D	WI-01	January 3, 1971	2nd term	
318	Herman Badillo	D	NY-21	January 3, 1971	2nd term	
319	LaMar Baker	R	TN-03	January 3, 1971	2nd term	Left the House in 1975.
320	Robert Bergland	D	MN-07	January 3, 1971	2nd term	
321	Goodloe Byron	D	MD-06	January 3, 1971	2nd term	
322	William R. Cotter	D	CT-01	January 3, 1971	2nd term	
323	George E. Danielson	D	CA-29	January 3, 1971	2nd term	
324	Ron Dellums	D	CA-07	January 3, 1971	2nd term	
325	Frank E. Denholm	D	SD-01	January 3, 1971	2nd term	Left the House in 1975.
326	Robert Drinan	D	MA-04	January 3, 1971	2nd term	
327	Bill Frenzel	R	MN-03	January 3, 1971	2nd term	
328	Ella T. Grasso	D	CT-06	January 3, 1971	2nd term	Left the House in 1975.
329	Elwood Hillis	R	IN-05	January 3, 1971	2nd term	
330	William J. Keating	R	OH-01	January 3, 1971	2nd term	Resigned on January 3, 1974.
331	Jack Kemp	R	NY-38	January 3, 1971	2nd term	
332	Norman F. Lent	R	NY-04	January 3, 1971	2nd term	
333	Dawson Mathis	D	GA-02	January 3, 1971	2nd term	
334	Romano Mazzoli	D	KY-03	January 3, 1971	2nd term	
335	John Y. McCollister	R	NE-02	January 3, 1971	2nd term	
336	Mike McCormack	D	WA-04	January 3, 1971	2nd term	
337	K. Gunn McKay	D	UT-01	January 3, 1971	2nd term	
338	Stewart McKinney	R	CT-04	January 3, 1971	2nd term	
339	Ralph Metcalfe	D	IL-01	January 3, 1971	2nd term	
340	Parren Mitchell	D	MD-07	January 3, 1971	2nd term	
341	Morgan F. Murphy	D	IL-02	January 3, 1971	2nd term	
342	Walter E. Powell	R	OH-08	January 3, 1971	2nd term	Left the House in 1975.
343	Peter A. Peyser	R	NY-23	January 3, 1971	2nd term	
344	Pierre S. du Pont IV	R	DE	January 3, 1971	2nd term	
345	Charles B. Rangel	D	NY-19	January 3, 1971	2nd term	
346	J. Kenneth Robinson	R	VA-07	January 3, 1971	2nd term	
347	Teno Roncalio	D	WY	January 3, 1971; Previous service, 1965–1967.	3rd term*	
348	J. Edward Roush	D	IN-04	January 3, 1971; Previous service, 1959–1969.	7th term*	
349	William R. Roy	D	KS-02	January 3, 1971	2nd term	Left the House in 1975.
350	Harold L. Runnels	D	NM-02	January 3, 1971	2nd term	
351	Paul Sarbanes	D	MD-03	January 3, 1971	2nd term	
352	John F. Seiberling	D	OH-14	January 3, 1971	2nd term	
353	Dick Shoup	R	MT-01	January 3, 1971	2nd term	Left the House in 1975.
354	Floyd Spence	R	SC-02	January 3, 1971	2nd term	
355	James V. Stanton	D	OH-20	January 3, 1971	2nd term	
356	Charles Thone	R	NE-01	January 3, 1971	2nd term	
357	Victor Veysey	R	CA-43	January 3, 1971	2nd term	Left the House in 1975.
358	Bill Young	R	FL-06	January 3, 1971	2nd term	
359	Mendel Jackson Davis	D	SC-01	April 27, 1971	2nd term	
360	William Oswald Mills	R	MD-01	May 25, 1971	2nd term	Died on May 24, 1973.
361	H. John Heinz III	R	PA-18	November 2, 1971	2nd term	
362	Richard W. Mallary	R	VT	January 7, 1972	2nd term	Left the House in 1975.
363	John Breaux	D	LA-07	September 30, 1972	2nd term	
364	M. Caldwell Butler	R	VA-06	November 7, 1972	2nd term	
365	James Abdnor	R	SD-02	January 3, 1973	1st term	
366	Ike F. Andrews	D	NC-04	January 3, 1973	1st term	
367	William L. Armstrong	R	CO-05	January 3, 1973	1st term	
368	Louis A. Bafalis	R	FL-10	January 3, 1973	1st term	
369	Robin Beard	R	TN-06	January 3, 1973	1st term	
370	David R. Bowen	D	MS-02	January 3, 1973	1st term	
371	John B. Breckinridge	D	KY-06	January 3, 1973	1st term	
372	George Brown, Jr.	D	CA-38	January 3, 1973; Previous service, 1963–1971.	5th term*	
373	Clair Burgener	R	CA-42	January 3, 1973	1st term	
374	Yvonne B. Burke	D	CA-37	January 3, 1973	1st term	
375	Thad Cochran	R	MS-04	January 3, 1973	1st term	
376	William Cohen	R	ME-02	January 3, 1973	1st term	
377	John Bertrand Conlan	R	AZ-04	January 3, 1973	1st term	
378	Paul W. Cronin	R	MA-05	January 3, 1973	1st term	Left the House in 1975.
379	Robert Daniel	R	VA-04	January 3, 1973	1st term	
380	Harold Vernon Froehlich	R	WI-08	January 3, 1973	1st term	Left the House in 1975.
381	Benjamin A. Gilman	R	NY-26	January 3, 1973	1st term	
382	Ronald Ginn	D	GA-01	January 3, 1973	1st term	
383	Bill Gunter	D	FL-05	January 3, 1973	1st term	Left the House in 1975.
384	Tennyson Guyer	R	OH-04	January 3, 1973	1st term	
385	Robert P. Hanrahan	R	IL-03	January 3, 1973	1st term	Left the House in 1975.
386	Andrew J. Hinshaw	R	CA-39	January 3, 1973	1st term	
387	Marjorie Holt	R	MD-04	January 3, 1973	1st term	
388	Elizabeth Holtzman	D	NY-16	January 3, 1973	1st term	
389	Robert J. Huber	R	MI-18	January 3, 1973	1st term	Left the House in 1975.
390	William H. Hudnut III	R	IN-11	January 3, 1973	1st term	Left the House in 1975.
391	James P. Johnson	R	CO-04	January 3, 1973	1st term	
392	James Robert Jones	D	OK-01	January 3, 1973	1st term	
393	Barbara Jordan	D	TX-18	January 3, 1973	1st term	
394	William M. Ketchum	R	CA-36	January 3, 1973	1st term	
395	William Lehman	D	FL-13	January 3, 1973	1st term	
396	Jerry Litton	D	MO-06	January 3, 1973	1st term	
397	Gillis W. Long	D	LA-08	January 3, 1973; Previous service, 1963–1965.	2nd term*	
398	Trent Lott	R	MS-05	January 3, 1973	1st term	
399	Edward Rell Madigan	R	IL-21	January 3, 1973	1st term	
400	Joseph J. Maraziti	R	NJ-13	January 3, 1973	1st term	Left the House in 1975.
401	James G. Martin	R	NC-09	January 3, 1973	1st term	
402	Clem McSpadden	D	OK-02	January 3, 1973	1st term	Left the House in 1975.
403	Edward Mezvinsky	D	IA-01	January 3, 1973	1st term	
404	Dale Milford	D	TX-24	January 3, 1973	1st term	
405	Donald J. Mitchell	R	NY-31	January 3, 1973	1st term	
406	Joe Moakley	D	MA-09	January 3, 1973	1st term	
407	Carlos Moorhead	R	CA-20	January 3, 1973	1st term	
408	George M. O'Brien	R	IL-17	January 3, 1973	1st term	
409	Wayne Owens	D	UT-02	January 3, 1973	1st term	Left the House in 1975.
410	Stanford Parris	R	VA-08	January 3, 1973	1st term	Left the House in 1975.
411	Joel Pritchard	R	WA-01	January 3, 1973	1st term	
412	Ralph Regula	R	OH-16	January 3, 1973	1st term	
413	Matthew John Rinaldo	R	NJ-12	January 3, 1973	1st term	
414	Angelo Roncallo	R	NY-03	January 3, 1973	1st term	Left the House in 1975.
415	Charlie Rose	D	NC-07	January 3, 1973	1st term	
416	Leo Ryan	D	CA-11	January 3, 1973	1st term	
417	Ronald A. Sarasin	R	CT-05	January 3, 1973	1st term	
418	Patricia Schroeder	D	CO-01	January 3, 1973	1st term	
419	Bud Shuster	R	PA-09	January 3, 1973	1st term	
420	Pete Stark	D	CA-08	January 3, 1973	1st term	
421	Alan Steelman	R	TX-05	January 3, 1973	1st term	
422	Gerry Studds	D	MA-12	January 3, 1973	1st term	
423	Steve Symms	R	ID-01	January 3, 1973	1st term	
424	Gene Taylor	R	MO-07	January 3, 1973	1st term	
425	Ray Thornton	D	AR-04	January 3, 1973	1st term	
426	David Towell	R	NV	January 3, 1973	1st term	Left the House in 1975.
427	David C. Treen	R	LA-03	January 3, 1973	1st term	
428	William F. Walsh	R	NY-33	January 3, 1973	1st term	
429	Charles Wilson	D	TX-02	January 3, 1973	1st term	
430	Andrew Young	D	GA-05	January 3, 1973	1st term	
431	Edward Lunn Young	R	SC-06	January 3, 1973	1st term	Left the House in 1975.
432	Samuel H. Young	R	IL-10	January 3, 1973	1st term	Left the House in 1975.
433	Don Young	R	AK	March 6, 1973	1st term	
434	Lindy Boggs	D	LA-02	March 20, 1973	1st term	
435	Cardiss Collins	D	IL-07	June 5, 1973	1st term	
	Robert Bauman	R	MD-01	August 21, 1973	1st term	
	John Murtha	D	PA-12	February 5, 1974	1st term	
	Richard Vander Veen	D	MI-05	February 18, 1974	1st term	
	Robert J. Lagomarsino	R	CA-13	March 5, 1974	1st term	
	Tom Luken	D	OH-01	March 5, 1974	1st term	Left the House in 1975.
	J. Bob Traxler	D	MI-08	April 23, 1974	1st term	
	John L. Burton	D	CA-06	June 4, 1974	1st term	

== Delegates ==
Rank	Delegate	Party	District	Seniority date (Previous service, if any)	No.# of term(s)	Notes
1	Walter E. Fauntroy	D	DC	March 23, 1971	2nd term	
2	Jaime Benítez Rexach	D	PR	January 3, 1973	1st term	
3	Ron de Lugo	D	VI	January 3, 1973	1st term	
4	Antonio Borja Won Pat	D	GU	January 3, 1973	1st term	

== See also ==
- 93rd United States Congress
- List of United States congressional districts
- List of United States senators in the 93rd Congress
