= Hank Brown =

American politician (born 1940)

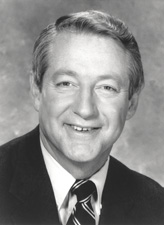

21st President of the University of Colorado System
- In office August 1, 2005 – March 10, 2008; Acting: August 1, 2005 – May 2006
- Preceded by: Elizabeth Hoffman
- Succeeded by: Bruce D. Benson

President of the University of Northern Colorado
- In office July 1998 – June 2002
- Preceded by: Howard Skinner (acting)
- Succeeded by: Kay Norton

United States Senator from Colorado
- In office January 3, 1991 – January 3, 1997
- Preceded by: William L. Armstrong
- Succeeded by: Wayne Allard

Member of the U.S. House of Representatives from Colorado's 4th district
- In office January 3, 1981 – January 3, 1991
- Preceded by: James Paul Johnson
- Succeeded by: Wayne Allard

Member of the Colorado Senate from the 29th district
- In office January 3, 1973 – January 5, 1977
- Preceded by: Ken Kinnie
- Succeeded by: Duane Woodard

Personal details
- Born: George Hanks Brown; February 12, 1940 (age 86) Denver, Colorado, U.S.
- Party: Republican
- Education: University of Colorado, Boulder (BS, JD); George Washington University (LLM)

Military service
- Branch/service: United States Navy
- Years of service: 1962–1966
- Rank: Lieutenant
- Battles/wars: Vietnam War

George Hanks "Hank" Brown (born February 12, 1940) is an American politician and lawyer from Colorado. A member of the Republican Party, he served as a U.S. representative and U.S. senator. He served as the president of the University of Northern Colorado from July 1998 to June 2002, and later as the 21st president of the University of Colorado system from April 2005 to January 2008.

== Education ==
Brown was born in Denver in 1940, and graduated from college in 1961 and from law school in 1969, both from the University of Colorado. Brown also has a Master of Laws degree from George Washington University. At the former, he became a member of Delta Tau Delta International Fraternity.

== Career ==
=== Military ===
Brown served in the United States Navy from 1962 to 1966. He was an aviator and volunteered for service in Vietnam. He was decorated for his combat service as a forward air controller.

=== Politics ===
He served in the Colorado Senate from 1972 to 1976 and was elected to the United States House of Representatives in 1980, serving until 1991. In 1990, he was elected to the United States Senate in which he served one term and did not run again in the 1996 election. From 1998 to 2002, he was president of the University of Northern Colorado. Brown and his wife, Nan, live in Denver.

In 1995, Brown was involved with the Airstan incident in which he mediated efforts for a prisoner exchange between Russia and the Taliban, which ultimately broke down, but his efforts set up an escape by the Russian prisoners.

=== CU President ===
In April 2005, Brown was named to succeed Elizabeth Hoffman as the president of the University of Colorado on an interim basis. Brown took office on August 1, 2005. Upon taking this role, he inherited a system weakened by sharply decreasing state appropriations, and scandals that included allegations of misuse of foundation funds, instances of sexual assault by members of the football team, waning public confidence, and sharp criticism in the state newspapers. He was later praised for the effective remedies he implemented for aggressively attacking these issues.

During his interim tenure, Brown also led the university through the controversy surrounding Ethnic Studies professor Ward Churchill. An investigation of Churchill for academic misconduct which had been supported by American Council of Trustees and Alumni, an organization that Brown had co-founded in 1995, identified seven separate instances of misconduct and referred the matter to the university administration. Brown urged the Board of Regents to dismiss Churchill, which it did in March 2006, overriding a tenure committee recommendation for one-year suspension. The decision was met with mixed opinion. Those in favor applauded the decision based on the findings of academic fraud, while those opposed believe the firing was simply a smokescreen to silence his views. In a July 2007 Wall Street Journal op-ed on the Churchill affair, Brown wrote: "Controversy -- especially self-sought controversy -- doesn't immunize a faculty member from adhering to professional standards."

In May 2006, the regents appointed Brown permanently. Later that year, he announced an initiative to add class rankings to student transcripts as a counterweight to grade inflation.

In 2007, CU set a fundraising record of $133 million, with some donors "credit[ing] Brown with restoring their confidence in the university." Brown tendered his resignation January 18, 2007 and left his post effective March 10, 2008.

=== Other positions ===
Brown is a member of the board of the International Foundation for Electoral Systems, a non-profit organization which supports international elections.

== Bibliography ==
- Hank Brown, John B. Cooney, and Michael B. Poliakoff, 'Openness, Transparency, and Accountability: Fostering Public Trust in Higher Education', in The Politically Correct University: Problems, Scope, and Reforms, Robert Maranto (ed.), Richard E. Redding (ed.), Frederick M. Hess (ed.), Washington, D.C.: The AEI Press, 2009

== Electoral history ==
1980 United States House of Representatives elections
Party	Candidate	Votes	%
Republican	Hank Brown	178,221	68.42
Democratic	Polly Baca	76,849	29.50
Libertarian	Cynthia Molson-Smith	5,421	2.08
Total votes		260,491	100.0
Republican hold			

1982 United States House of Representatives elections
Party	Candidate	Votes	%
Republican	Hank Brown (incumbent)	105,550	69.76
Democratic	Charles "Bud" Bishopp	45,750	30.24
Total votes		151,300	100.0
Republican hold			

1984 United States House of Representatives elections
Party	Candidate	Votes	%
Republican	Hank Brown (incumbent)	146,469	71.13
Democratic	Mary Fagan Bates	56,462	27.42
Libertarian	Randy Fitzgerald	2,999	1.45
Total votes		205,930	100.0
Republican hold			

1986 United States House of Representatives elections
Party	Candidate	Votes	%
Republican	Hank Brown (incumbent)	117,089	69.80
Democratic	David Sprague	50,672	30.20
Total votes		167,761	100.0
Republican hold			

1988 United States House of Representatives elections
Party	Candidate	Votes	%
Republican	Hank Brown (incumbent)	156,202	73.08
Democratic	Charles S. Vigil	57,552	26.92
Total votes		213,754	100.0
Republican hold			

General election results
Party	Candidate	Votes	%
Republican	Hank Brown	569,048	55.68%
Democratic	Josie Heath	425,746	41.66%
Concerns of People	John Heckman	15,432	1.51%
Colorado Prohibition	Earl F. Dodge	11,801	1.15%
Write-In	Others	32	0.00%
Majority		143,302	14.02%
Turnout		1,022,059	
Republican hold			

U.S. House of Representatives
Preceded by James Paul Johnson	Member of the U.S. House of Representatives from Colorado's 4th congressional district 1981–1991	Succeeded by Wayne Allard
U.S. Senate
Preceded by William L. Armstrong	U.S. Senator (Class 1) from Colorado; 1991–1997; Served alongside: Tim Wirth, Ben Nighthorse Campbell	Succeeded by Wayne Allard
Party political offices
Preceded by William L. Armstrong	Republican nominee for U.S. Senator from Colorado (Class 2); 1990	Succeeded by Wayne Allard
Academic offices
Preceded by Elizabeth Hoffman	President of the University of Colorado System; 2005–2008	Succeeded by Bruce D. Benson
U.S. order of precedence (ceremonial)
Preceded by Tim Wirth as Former U.S. Senator	Order of precedence of the United States	Succeeded by Mark Udall as Former U.S. Senator
