= Donald W. Sweeting =

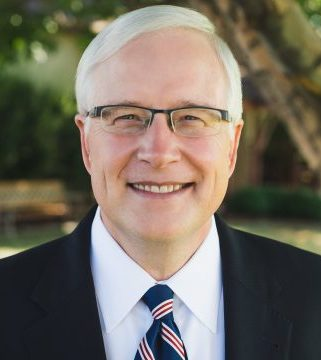

Chancellor of Colorado Christian University
- Incumbent
- Assumed office August 1, 2016
- Preceded by: William L. Armstrong

Personal details
- Spouse: Christina
- Education: Moody Bible Institute; Lawrence University; Oxford University Regent College; Trinity Evangelical Divinity School

Donald William Sweeting (born 1955) is an American university chancellor, educator, professor, and ordained pastor. He is currently the chancellor of Colorado Christian University, having previously served as the school's president from 2016-2022, and before that as president of Reformed Theological Seminary, in Orlando, Florida.

== Education ==
Donald Sweeting attended Moody Bible Institute then transferred to study at Lawrence University where he earned a Bachelor's of Arts in History and served as president of the university's student council (LUCC). Sweeting earned his Bachelors and Masters from Oxford University, where he read theology and also led the Theological Students Fellowship. He also spent a year at Regent College in Vancouver. B.C. studying under theologian J.I. Packer. Sweeting earned his doctorate in Church History and Historical Theology from Trinity Evangelical Divinity School. Under the supervision of John Woodbridge and Harold O.J. Brown, Sweeting's dissertation focused on the changing relationship between Catholics and Evangelicals in the United States between 1960 and 2000.

== Experience ==
Sweeting served as an intern for U.S. Congressman John B. Anderson in 1976. After college (1979), Sweeting served with Chuck Colson and Prison Fellowship in Washington, D.C. where he coordinated early efforts in prison reform, worked on public policy, and served as a traveling assistant to Colson.

Sweeting was originally ordained at Christ Church of Lake Forest, Illinois. In 1986, he helped plant a non-denominational church in the Chain of Lakes area and served as its first full-time pastor, and senior pastor until 1997. In 1998 Sweeting was ordained in the Evangelical Presbyterian Church. He then served as senior pastor of Cherry Creek Presbyterian Church in southeast metro Denver and in addition, taught church history at Denver Seminary. During this time Sweeting also served on the board of John Stott (the Langham Foundation, later John Stott Ministries, and now called the Langham Partnership) and the National Association of Evangelicals.

Donald Sweeting's writings have appeared in The Washington Examiner, The Washington Times, Fox News, The Jerusalem Post, Townhall, the Christian Post, Real Clear Politics, Real Clear Religion, and World Opinions. Besides his dissertation, he has co-authored two books, How to Finish the Christian Life and Lessons from the Life of Moody, both co-written with his father, George Sweeting. He has also published numerous articles for well-known magazines and scholarly journals.

Sweeting was the president of Reformed Theological Seminary in Orlando, Florida, and also served as the James Woodrow Hassell Professor of Church History there from 2010 until 2016. In February 2016, Sweeting was named Alumnus of the Year at Moody Bible Institute. In August 2016 he was appointed as president of Colorado Christian University. In 2022, he was named chancellor of the university.
