= 1990 United States Senate election in Colorado =

- November 6, 1990
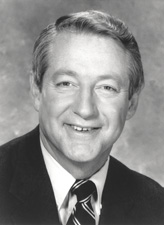

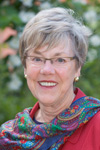
Nominee	Hank Brown	Josie Heath
Party	Republican	Democratic
Popular vote	569,048	425,746
Percentage	55.68%	41.66%
- County results Brown: 50–60% 60–70% 70–80% 80–90% Heath: 40–50% 50–60% 60–70%
U.S. senator before election
William L. Armstrong
Republican
Elected U.S. Senator
Hank Brown
Republican

The 1990 United States Senate election in Colorado took place on November 6, 1990. Incumbent Republican senator William L. Armstrong did not seek re-election to another term. Republican nominee Hank Brown won the open seat, defeating Democratic nominee Josie Heath.

== Democratic primary ==
=== Candidates ===
- Josie Heath, former Boulder County Commissioner
- Carlos F. Lucero, Pueblo attorney and candidate for U.S. Senate in 1984

== General election ==
=== Candidates ===
- Hank Brown, U.S. Representative from Greeley (Republican)
- Earl Dodge (Prohibition)
- Josie Heath, former Boulder County Commissioner (Democratic)
- John Heckman (Concerns of People)

General election results
Party	Candidate	Votes	%
Republican	Hank Brown	569,048	55.68%
Democratic	Josie Heath	425,746	41.66%
Concerns of People	John Heckman	15,432	1.51%
Colorado Prohibition	Earl F. Dodge	11,801	1.15%
Write-In	Others	32	0.00%
Majority		143,302	14.02%
Turnout		1,022,059	
Republican hold			

== See also ==
- 1990 United States Senate elections
