= Josie Heath =

American politician

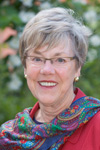

Personal details
- Born: Josephine Ellen Ward; September 5, 1937 (age 88) San Jose, California, U.S.
- Party: Democratic
- Spouse: Rollie Heath (m. 1961)
- Education: Eastern Oregon University (BA); University of Wisconsin, Madison (MEd)

Josie Ward Heath (born September 5, 1937) is an American politician, community activist and educator who currently serves as a member of the Colorado State Land Board. She studied at East Oregon State College and graduated in 1959 with a degree in education, followed by a Master of Science in 1960 from the University of Wisconsin. She married Rollie Heath, and they lived in West Germany for 4 years while her husband worked for the military. Upon return to the U.S. the family moved to Boulder, where Josie began her involvement in community organizations and politics.

Along the way, Heath has held numerous positions, including: President of the Boulder County Women’s Resource Center (1974), Vice-President of Boulder County United Way (1975), and Director of Women’s Resource Center at Red Rocks Campus of Community College of Denver (1975-1979). From 1976-1979 she was a presidential appointee for the U.S Circuit Court judicial selection committee, and in 1979 President Jimmy Carter appointed her as Denver regional director for ACTION (a federal agency for volunteer service), 2004 - delegate to the Democratic National Convention. Heath was the Democratic nominee for Colorado's Class 2 U.S. Senate seat in 1990, but lost to Republican Hank Brown. She had previously served as Chair of the Board of County Commissioners for Boulder County. Heath served as a U.S. Circuit Judge Nominating Commission member for the 10th District. She is a founder of the Boulder County Clean Air Consortium. She was most recently President of the Community Foundation of Boulder County; she retired in January 2017 after 21 years at the Foundation.

Heath was inducted into the Colorado Women's Hall of Fame in 2000. Heath is a member of the Unitarian Universalist Church of Boulder.

Party political offices
Preceded by Nancy Dick	Democratic nominee for U.S. Senator from Colorado (Class 2); 1990	Succeeded by Tom Strickland
