= Wayne N. Aspinall =

American politician (1896–1983)

Wayne Norviel Aspinall
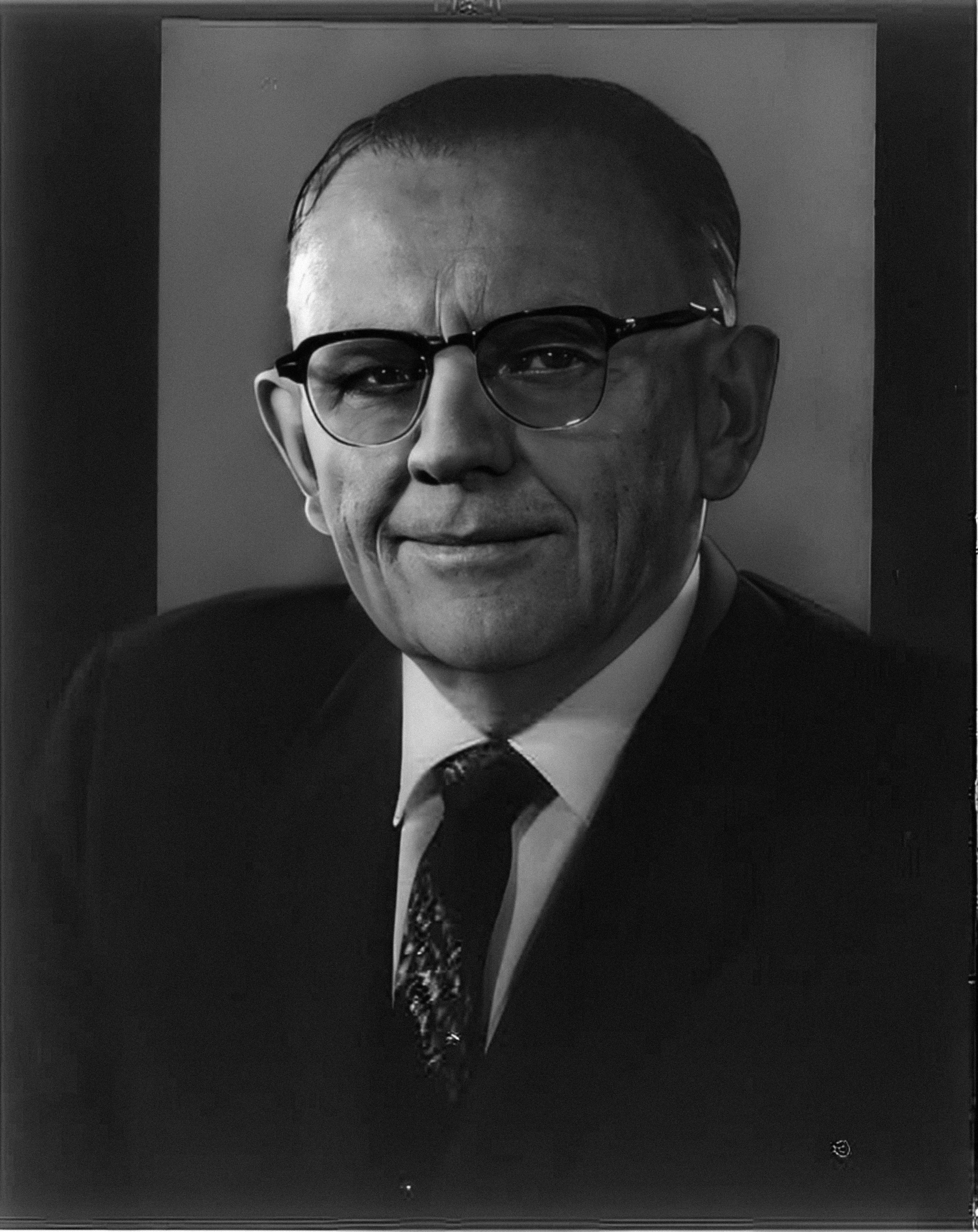

Member of the U.S. House of Representatives from Colorado's 4th district
- In office January 3, 1949 – January 3, 1973
- Preceded by: Robert F. Rockwell
- Succeeded by: James Paul Johnson

Personal details
- Born: Wayne Norviel Aspinall; April 3, 1896 Middleburg, Logan County, Ohio, U.S.
- Died: October 9, 1983 (aged 87) Palisade, Colorado, U.S.
- Party: Democratic
- Education: University of Denver

Wayne Norviel Aspinall (April 3, 1896 – October 9, 1983) was an American lawyer and politician from Colorado. He is largely known for his tenure in the United States House of Representatives, serving 12 terms as a Democrat from 1949 to 1973 from Colorado's 4th congressional district. Aspinall became known for his direction of the House Interior and Insular Affairs Committee, of which he was the chairman from 1959 to 1973. Aspinall focused the majority of his efforts on Western land and water issues.

His actions supporting resource development often drew the ire of the increasingly powerful environmental lobby in the 1960s. David Brower, a prominent executive director of the Sierra Club, said that the environmental movement had seen "dream after dream dashed on the stony continents of Wayne Aspinall." The congressman returned the animosity, calling environmentalists "over-indulged zealots" and "aristocrats" to whom "balance means nothing." This battle shaped Aspinall's congressional career.

== Biography ==
Aspinall was born in Middleburg, Logan County, Ohio in 1896 and moved to Palisade, Colorado in 1904. He studied at the University of Denver until World War I, when he enlisted in the armed services (the Air Service of the Signal Corps). He returned to DU after his discharge and graduated in 1919. After several years of teaching around the state, he enrolled in law school in Denver and graduated in 1925. In 1930, he won a seat in the Colorado State House of Representatives, serving as Speaker in 1937 and 1938 before moving to the State Senate from 1939 to 1948. He served in World War II as a captain in Military Government during 1943 and 1944 as well.

=== Congress ===
In 1948, he chose to run for national office, hoping for it to be a stepping stone to Colorado's governorship. However, he would stay in the U.S. House for 24 years.

Living on Colorado's Western Slope defined Aspinall's political ideology. His family had traditionally voted Republican, but the party's in-fighting in 1912 between Theodore Roosevelt and William H. Taft disillusioned Aspinall. However, despite becoming a Democrat, his rural roots shaped a relatively conservative philosophy. He believed in limited federal involvement in western land and water issues; to him, localities could better decide the uses of their resources. "When I was young…I lived outside the little town of Palisade, and the townspeople always seemed to call the shots. Then I moved to Palisade, and the bigger town of Grand Junction always seemed to call the shots. Then I went to the state Legislature, and the Eastern Slope…seemed to call the shots. And in Congress, the big metropolitan areas seemed to hold all the marbles."

=== Later years ===
His service in the U.S. House ended in 1972 with his loss in the Fourth District Democratic primary. However, Aspinall remained active in politics. He voiced his opinions on the need for the United States to become self-reliant for its energy needs, pushing oil shale development until his death in 1983.

Colorado history remembers Aspinall as one of the state's most influential politicians. Known as "The Chairman," he led the Interior and Insular Affairs Committee during a period that defined future water and land policy in the United States. Colorado governor Richard Lamm, a Democrat who had several ideological differences with Aspinall, remarked that "[N]o one in our history has done more to win Colorado a place at the table in Washington."

He had a son, Owen Aspinall, who went on to become Governor of American Samoa.

== Colorado River Storage Act of 1956 ==
Aspinall favored dams and water reclamation projects for several reasons: (1) the power they generated; (2) general recreational use; and (3) he felt the key to Western economic prosperity lay in obtaining permanent stored supply of water for economic purposes. In Aspinall's mind, Americans had many opportunities to enjoy scenic areas, so damming a few of them would not hurt the country. After his career, he boasted that he had brought over $1 billion worth of water projects to his district. According to his observers, he "never met a dam he didn't like."

The Colorado River Storage Project (CRSP) came before Congress in the early to mid-1950s. The bill, sponsored by Wayne Aspinall and several western allies, called for damming several areas in the Upper Basin of the Colorado River. It included the Echo Park Dam proposal, located within Dinosaur National Monument. This became a volatile issue between environmentalists and water project advocates. Located just below the Green and Yampa Rivers, the proposed 525-foot (160 m) high dam would have created a 43,000 acre (170 km^{2}) lake, flooding the Green River Canyon for 63 miles (101 km) and the Yampa River Canyon for 44 miles (71 km). However, because of increased environmental awareness around the country, the majority of the public opposed the project. In 1954 alone, the Department of the Interior received 20,000 pieces of mail about the plan, and one insider estimated the letters ran 80 to 1 in opposition of the project.

In 1954 and 1955, environmentalists defeated the controversial aspects of the CRSP. In '55, Aspinall conceded that for the bill to pass, he needed to sacrifice the Echo Park plan. Several more compromises between the two sides gave way to the Colorado River Storage Act of 1956 (Public Law 485, in chapter 203), which called for the creation of other irrigation projects and several large dams, including the Glen Canyon Dam in Utah, which created Lake Powell. Other projects created from the CRSP included the Flaming Gorge, Navajo, and Curecanti reservoirs. For his compromise, Aspinall gained five other reclamation projects and three hydroelectric dams for the Fourth District. The bill passed the House 256–136 in March 1956 and then-President Dwight Eisenhower signed it into law soon thereafter.

== Frying Pan Arkansas Project of 1962 ==
This plan, originally proposed in 1951, called for water diversion out of the Frying Pan and Roaring Fork Rivers on the Western Slope of Colorado to the Arkansas River, which flowed to a drier climate in the southeast part of the state. Because the Front Range (Boulder, Denver, Colorado Springs, and Pueblo) had a tremendous population advantage over the Western Slope, most of the state favored the project. Precedent for this maneuver had been set in 1937 with the Colorado-Big Thompson Project, which transferred Western Slope water to farmers in northeast Colorado.

Because he wanted to focus the House's efforts on the CRSP in the mid-'50s, Aspinall tabled Fry-Ark until 1960. However, when the issue resurfaced, Aspinall's opinion created controversy in his own district. Many of his constituents disapproved of sending their water to the Front Range. Aspinall, however, pushed the plan through because he realized that as a strong proponent of public water development, it seemed contradictory for him to block reclamation projects that benefited others. The bill passed in August 1962 when Aspinall attained a plan calling for the construction of a 28,000 acre-foot (35,000,000 m^{3}) reservoir on the Roaring Fork River near Aspen, which would compensate the Western Slope for its loss of water.

Fry-Ark demonstrated Aspinall's resolve to proliferate the amount of publicly funded water projects throughout the West, pitting him against the wishes of the majority of his constituents in the early 1960s. He quickly regained favor with them, however, when its precedent eventually brought more dams and reclamation projects back to the Fourth District.

== Wilderness Act of 1964 ==
One of the first comprehensive pieces of environmental legislation during the era faced a lengthy battle in Congress between Presidents Kennedy and Johnson and western politicians like Aspinall. When the Wilderness bill first came to the House in 1961, Aspinall employed various stall tactics to never allow the popular bill out of the Interior Committee. He continued this through 1962 and into '63, earning him the wrath of the country's environmentalists, preservationist politicians, and a large amount of the public.

However, in November 1963 Aspinall made a deal with John F. Kennedy. Aspinall greatly desired a public land review commission (see below), while one of Kennedy's primary goals was the passage of the Wilderness Act. Aspinall agreed to release the bill in exchange for the administration's cooperation with the land commission. (Also, Kennedy's assassination on November 22, 1963 created an ethos in Washington that essentially made Kennedy a martyr. Lyndon Johnson took up and pushed through many of his legislative goals because of public empathy.)

Before Aspinall let the Wilderness Act of 1964 pass, he dropped the original request of 55 million acres (220,000 km^{2}) of protected wilderness to only 9.1 million acres (37,000 km^{2}). He also inserted a clause, called the "1984 clause," that allowed mining interests to still have access to many of these areas until December 31, 1983. Despite these concessions, the House passed it 373-1 and Lyndon Johnson signed it in September. The act also refused to turn over exclusive power to the executive branch, keeping some power in Congress for public land oversight. Ironically, the National Wildlife Federation named Aspinall their "Conservationist of the Year" in 1964 for his role in the eventual passage of the bill.

== Colorado River Basin Act of 1968 and the Central Arizona Project ==
From 1966 to 1968, Aspinall took on the final significant water project battle of his congressional career. The purpose of the Colorado River Basin Project, according to supporters, was to build dams to generate revenue and energy for communities in the Lower Basin of the Colorado River without using much of the Upper Basin's river water. The primary focus of the project was the Central Arizona Project (CAP). CAP supporters, among other demands, wanted to build two dams, one that would flood Grand Canyon National Monument and part of Grand Canyon National Park (Bridge Canyon Dam), with the other on the edge of the Grand Canyon (Marble Canyon Dam). Aspinall originally supported this, claiming it would generate revenue for all Colorado River Basin states. In turn, however, he demanded that his district receive five reclamation projects for his support. Several congressmen, including Arizona senator Carl Hayden, saw this as action as a move that held the state hostage, and many would come to resent Aspinall for it.

Environmentalists vehemently opposed the CAP because of its detriment to the scenery of the Grand Canyon. Aspinall would later say "We viewed the development of the river as the only reasonable, practicable, safe, and logical way for millions of Americans and visitors to enjoy the canyon bottom which to date so few have had an opportunity to visit or view." However, during the debate, the Sierra Club mocked that philosophy, purchasing an ad in national newspapers in July 1966. "Should we also flood the Sistine Chapel so tourists can get nearer the ceiling?" it asked.

Sensing that he couldn't break the stalemate, Aspinall dropped the Grand Canyon dams from the CRPB in late August 1967. The bill eventually passed in the middle of 1968, creating the Colorado River Basin Act. However, in exchange for this compromise, Aspinall did receive five projects for Colorado (the Dallas Creek, Animas-La Plata, West Divide, San Miguel, and Dolores projects).

Of those five, only two were eventually built (Dolores and Dallas Creek). The Animas-La Plata project is currently under construction, and is one of the last major water projects in the West. Jimmy Carter declared a "Hit List" in 1977 on what he felt was wasteful spending on "pork barrel" water projects, eliminating the other three (among others). Furthermore, no new major reclamation projects were approved during the rest of the era, partly because Aspinall's heavy-handed demands that constrained the legislation broke apart the western coalition of politicians that supported the construction of water projects.

== Public Land Law Review Commission ==
Kennedy's concession in 1963 to enact the Wilderness Act gave Aspinall the go-ahead to organize his pet project, the Public Land Law Review Commission (PLLRC) in 1965. The PLLRC reviewed all federal regulations affecting the control and uses of the nation's public lands and recommended changes that would help the federal government manage these areas more efficiently. Aspinall served as the commission's chair for the entirety of its existence, from 1965 until 1970.

The final report came out on June 23, 1970. Titled "One Third of the Nation's Lands," it gave 137 recommendations to Richard Nixon and Congress. Among its suggestions:

- States should have a greater say in how public lands are managed
- Congress should have greater say in the uses of public land because the executive branch exerted too much singular influence
- All public-land issues should be concentrated under a new Department of Natural Resources, with committees in the House and Senate
- The Secretary of the Interior's power to withdraw public lands from development without Congressional approval should be limited
- Regional mining, timber, and grazing needs should be supported to increase economic growth in local communities
- The federal government should help stimulate the oil shale industry

Environmentalists blasted its findings. The Sierra Club accused the study of being "oriented toward maximum immediate commercial exploitation..." predicated upon a world with an "ever-expanding economy and unlimited resources." Others stated that the report only considered studies and opinions favorable to Aspinall's political ideology. Many citizens were also still unhappy with Aspinall for blocking the creation of the Redwood National Park in California for half of the decade until its passage in 1968, and they saw this as more evidence that he served as a mouthpiece for the extractive industries' interests in Congress.

Aspinall proposed HR 9211 in his final session in Congress to implement many of the PLLRC's recommendations, but it failed to pass. During the height of the environmental movement, many of these suggestions were unacceptable to the public. However, later bills spawned from the ideas in the PLLRC, such as the Federal Land Policy and Management Act of 1976.

== 1970 and 1972 Democratic primaries ==
After over two decades in office, the turbulent forces of the 1960s and early '70s caught up with Aspinall. With liberalism gaining strength throughout the country by protesting the Vietnam War and advocating civil rights for African Americans and equal rights for women, reformers gained control of the Democratic Party. They jumped on the opportunity to remove one of the party's most conservative members.

In 1970 a young Democrat named Richard Perchlik challenged Aspinall in the Fourth District Democratic primary. Although Aspinall won by over 11,000 votes in his first primary challenge since 1948, Perchlik's campaign portrayed Aspinall as old (74 at the time) and out of touch with the ideals of liberals on the war and the environment. The challenger also accused "The Chairman" of being too connected to the extractive special interests and railed against him for his role in what reformers viewed as a flawed seniority system in Congress.

Aspinall's friend and colleague, Democratic congressman Byron Rogers of Colorado's First District, did not survive 1970's primary season, however. A young liberal lawyer from Denver, Craig Barnes, defeated Rogers (although Barnes himself lost the general election). Rogers had a similar philosophy and legislative record to Aspinall, seemingly foreshadowing Aspinall's fate in 1972.

The degree to which Aspinall appreciated the challenge of liberal Democrats is debated. He did say that "this drive toward liberalism, organization of committees, etc., is causing me to wonder if I haven't reached the place where I should let some younger and more militant person take over." However, he never altered his campaign message in 1972, even after the Republican-controlled Colorado General Assembly redrew the state's district lines to include largely liberal precincts in the Fourth District. "Wayne Aspinall represents all the interests because all the people have interest in our resources," his campaign said, continuing to target the miners, ranchers, and loggers that lived on the Western Slope. He never attempted to alter his message to assuage the concerns of his new liberal constituents.

His opponent in the 1972 Democratic primary, Alan Merson, employed the same strategy that Perchlik and Barnes used two years previously. Merson attacked Aspinall for being slow to recognize developing energy problems, promoting policies that fed constant growth, building needless water projects, and being a tool of special interests. Merson received extensive external aid, accepting endorsements from The New York Times, Field and Stream, and even Reader's Digest. The environmental lobby provided most of the support to Merson's campaign, with $20,000 coming from the League of Conservation Voters. Environmental Action, having named Aspinall to their 1972 "Dirty Dozen" list of biggest congressional enemies to the environment, also endorsed Merson.

Using the young, liberal vote on the Front Range, Merson defeated Aspinall in the primary 53% to 47%. History credits Aspinall's loss to his age, the strength of the environmental issue in 1972, and the redistricting that cost "The Chairman" much of his conservative support on the Western Slope.

However, redistricting still favored Republicans, despite the liberal Merson's victory. Moving urban voters into the Fourth split the Democratic vote and consolidated Republican strength. Merson lost to James Paul Johnson, who had been Aspinall's unsuccessful Republican opponent in 1966, in the general election in November 1972.

== Post-Congressional life ==
Aspinall stayed relatively active after leaving office in January 1973. He crossed party lines and endorsed Gerald Ford for president in 1976. He also pressed for further exploration of oil shale in the late 1970s, serving on the board of directors for the Paraho Oil Shale Demonstration, Inc., hoping to lead the country to an alternative energy source to end American reliance on oil during the energy crisis caused by the Arab Oil Embargo.

He proudly took part in the Sagebrush Rebellion, a movement popular from 1979–1982 that attempted to reclaim some federally protected land for determination by states and local governments.

Aspinall resumed the practice of law, was a resident of Palisade, Colo., until his death there October 9, 1983; he was cremated, and his ashes were interred at Orchard Mesa Municipal Cemetery, Grand Junction, Colorado. The United States Post Office and Courthouse in Grand Junction was renamed the Wayne N. Aspinall Federal Building in 1972.

== Electoral history ==
Wayne Aspinall electoral history

1948 United States House of Representatives elections
Party	Candidate	Votes	%
Democratic	Wayne Aspinall	34,695	51.86
Republican	Robert F. Rockwell (incumbent)	32,206	48.14
Total votes		66,901	100.0
Democratic gain from Republican			

1950 United States House of Representatives elections
Party	Candidate	Votes	%
Democratic	Wayne Aspinall (incumbent)	35,797	57.30
Republican	Jack Evans	26,674	42.70
Total votes		62,471	100.0
Democratic hold			

1952 United States House of Representatives elections
Party	Candidate	Votes	%
Democratic	Wayne Aspinall (incumbent)	39,676	50.02
Republican	Howard M. Shults	39,647	49.98
Total votes		79,323	100.0
Democratic hold			

1954 United States House of Representatives elections
Party	Candidate	Votes	%
Democratic	Wayne Aspinall (incumbent)	34,294	53.49
Republican	Charles E. Wilson	29,818	46.51
Total votes		64,112	100.0
Democratic hold			

1956 United States House of Representatives elections
Party	Candidate	Votes	%
Democratic	Wayne Aspinall (incumbent)	48,489	61.76
Republican	Hugh Caldwell	30,026	38.24
Total votes		78,515	100.0
Democratic hold			

1958 United States House of Representatives elections
Party	Candidate	Votes	%
Democratic	Wayne Aspinall (incumbent)	43,785	63.61
Republican	J. R. "Dick" Wells	25,048	36.39
Total votes		68,833	100.0
Democratic hold			

1960 United States House of Representatives elections
Party	Candidate	Votes	%
Democratic	Wayne Aspinall (incumbent)	58,731	68.54
Republican	Charles P. Casteel	26,960	31.46
Total votes		85,691	100.0
Democratic hold			

1962 United States House of Representatives elections
Party	Candidate	Votes	%
Democratic	Wayne Aspinall (incumbent)	42,462	58.65
Republican	Leo L. Sommerville	29,943	41.35
Total votes		72,405	100.0
Democratic hold			

1964 United States House of Representatives elections
Party	Candidate	Votes	%
Democratic	Wayne Aspinall (incumbent)	106,685	63.02
Republican	Edwin S. Lamm	62,617	36.98
Total votes		169,302	100.0
Democratic hold			

1966 United States House of Representatives elections
Party	Candidate	Votes	%
Democratic	Wayne Aspinall (incumbent)	84,107	58.61
Republican	James Paul Johnson	59,404	41.39
Total votes		143,511	100.0
Democratic hold			

1968 United States House of Representatives elections
Party	Candidate	Votes	%
Democratic	Wayne Aspinall (incumbent)	92,680	54.69
Republican	Fred E. Anderson	76,776	45.31
Total votes		169,456	100.0
Democratic hold			

1970 United States House of Representatives elections
Party	Candidate	Votes	%
Democratic	Wayne Aspinall (incumbent)	76,244	55.08
Republican	Bill Gossard	62,169	44.92
Total votes		138,413	100.0
Democratic hold			

U.S. House of Representatives
Preceded by Robert F. Rockwell	Member of the U.S. House of Representatives from Colorado's 4th congressional district 1949–1973	Succeeded by James Paul Johnson
Political offices
Preceded by Clair Engle; California	Chairman of House Interior and Insular Affairs Committee; 1959–1973	Succeeded by James A. Haley; Florida
