= Nancy Dick =

American politician

41st Lieutenant Governor of Colorado
- In office January 10, 1979 – January 13, 1987
- Governor: Richard Lamm
- Preceded by: George Brown
- Succeeded by: Mike Callihan

Member of the Colorado House of Representatives from the 57th district
- In office January 1975 – January 10, 1979
- Preceded by: Michael L. Strang
- Succeeded by: Nick Theos

Personal details
- Born: July 22, 1930 (age 95) Detroit, Michigan, U.S.
- Party: Democratic
- Education: Michigan State University (BA); University of Denver (attended)

Nancy E. Dick (born July 22, 1930) was the 41st lieutenant governor of Colorado. She was a Democrat, and served from 1979 to 1987 under Governor Richard Lamm. She was Colorado's first female lieutenant governor.

She was born in Detroit, Michigan and attended the University of Denver College of Law. She served two terms in the Colorado House of Representatives before being elected Lieutenant Governor. She was the Democratic nominee for the U.S. Senate in 1984, losing to incumbent Republican William L. Armstrong.

Dick won the Democratic nomination for lieutenant governor in 1978, against Ruben A. Valdez, the only other candidate to receive enough support at the convention to appear on the ballot.

Dick's grandsons are Tomicah S. Tillemann and Levi Tillemann.

== See also ==
- List of female lieutenant governors in the United States

== Works cited ==
- "1970 State Representative Democratic Primary". Secretary of State of Colorado. Archived from the original on March 23, 2025.
- "Valdez wins top-line designation". Fort Collins Coloradoan. June 25, 1978. p. A3 – via Newspapers.com.

Political offices
Preceded by George Brown	Lieutenant Governor of Colorado; 1979–1987	Succeeded by Mike Callihan
Party political offices
Preceded by Floyd Haskell	Democratic nominee for U.S. Senator from Colorado (Class 2); 1984	Succeeded by Josie Heath
