= List of United States senators in the 93rd Congress =

This is a complete list of United States senators during the 93rd United States Congress listed by seniority from January 3, 1973, to January 3, 1975.

Order of service is based on the commencement of the senator's first term. Behind this is former service as a senator (only giving the senator seniority within their new incoming class), service as vice president, a House member, a cabinet secretary, or a governor of a state. The final factor is the population of the senator's state.

The most senior junior senator in this Congress was J. William Fulbright. The most junior senior senator in this congress was William Roth, until William Saxbe resigned on January 3, 1974. Robert Taft then held the distinction until Marlow Cook resigned on December 27, 1974, after which it was held by Walter Huddleston.

Senators who were sworn in during the middle of the two-year congressional term (up until the last senator who was not sworn in early after winning the November 1974 election) are listed at the end of the list with no number.

== Terms of service ==
Class	Terms of service of senators that expired in years
Class 3	Terms of service of senators that expired in 1975 (AK, AL, AR, AZ, CA, CO, CT, FL, GA, HI, IA, ID, IL, IN, KS, KY, LA, MD, MO, NC, ND, NH, NV, NY, OH, OK, OR, PA, SC, SD, UT, VT, WA, and WI.)
Class 1	Terms of service of senators that expired in 1977 (AZ, CA, CT, DE, FL, HI, IN, MA, MD, ME, MI, MN, MO, MS, MT, ND, NE, NJ, NM, NV, NY, OH, PA, RI, TN, TX, UT, VA, VT, WA, WI, WV, and WY.)
Class 2	Terms of service of senators that expired in 1979 (AK, AL, AR, CO, DE, GA, IA, ID, IL, KS, KY, LA, MA, ME, MI, MN, MS, MT, NC, NE, NH, NJ, NM, OK, OR, RI, SC, SD, TN, TX, VA, WV, and WY.)

== U.S. Senate seniority list ==
U.S. Senate seniority
Rank	Senator (party-state)	Seniority date	Other factors
1	George Aiken (R-VT)	January 10, 1941	
2	James Eastland (D-MS)	January 3, 1943	Previously a senator
3	John Little McClellan (D-AR)	January 3, 1943	
4	Warren G. Magnuson (D-WA)	December 14, 1944	
5	J. William Fulbright (D-AR)	January 3, 1945	
6	Milton Young (R-ND)	March 12, 1945	
7	John Sparkman (D-AL)	November 6, 1946	
8	John C. Stennis (D-MS)	November 17, 1947	
9	Russell B. Long (D-LA)	December 31, 1948	
10	John O. Pastore (D-RI)	December 19, 1950	
11	Wallace F. Bennett (R-UT)	January 3, 1951	
12	Henry M. Jackson (D-WA)	January 3, 1953	Former representative (12 years)
13	Mike Mansfield (D-MT)	January 3, 1953	Former representative (10 years)
14	Stuart Symington (D-MO)	January 3, 1953	
15	Sam Ervin (D-NC)	June 5, 1954	
16	Norris Cotton (R-NH)	November 8, 1954	Former representative (7 years, 10 months)
17	Roman Hruska (R-NE)	November 8, 1954	Former representative (1 year, 10 months)
18	Alan Bible (D-NV)	December 2, 1954	
19	Carl Curtis (R-NE)	January 1, 1955	
20	Clifford P. Case (R-NJ)	January 3, 1955	
21	Strom Thurmond (R-SC)	November 7, 1956	
22	Herman Talmadge (D-GA)	January 3, 1957	Former governor
23	Frank Church (D-ID)	January 3, 1957	
24	Jacob K. Javits (R-NY)	January 9, 1957	
25	William Proxmire (D-WI)	August 28, 1957	
26	Jennings Randolph (D-WV)	November 5, 1958	
27	Hugh Scott (R-PA)	January 3, 1959	Former representative (18 years)
28	Robert Byrd (D-WV)	January 3, 1959	Former representative (6 years)
29	Harrison A. Williams (D-NJ)	January 3, 1959	Former representative (4 years)
30	Edmund Muskie (D-ME)	January 3, 1959	Former governor
31	Philip Hart (D-MI)	January 3, 1959	Michigan 7th in population (1950)
32	Vance Hartke (D-IN)	January 3, 1959	Indiana 11th in population (1950)
33	Frank Moss (D-UT)	January 3, 1959	Utah 38th in population (1950)
34	Gale W. McGee (D-WY)	January 3, 1959	Wyoming 48th in population (1950)
35	Howard Cannon (D-NV)	January 3, 1959	Nevada 49th in population (1950)
36	Hiram Fong (R-HI)	August 21, 1959	
37	Quentin Northrup Burdick (D-ND)	August 8, 1960	
38	Lee Metcalf (D-MT)	January 3, 1961	Former representative
39	Claiborne Pell (D-RI)	January 3, 1961	
40	John Tower (R-TX)	June 15, 1961	
41	James B. Pearson (R-KS)	January 31, 1962	
42	Ted Kennedy (D-MA)	November 7, 1962	Massachusetts 9th in population (1960)
43	Thomas J. McIntyre (D-NH)	November 7, 1962	New Hampshire 45th in population (1960)
44	Abraham A. Ribicoff (D-CT)	January 3, 1963	Former representative (4 years), former cabinet secretary
45	George McGovern (D-SD)	January 3, 1963	Former representative (4 years) - South Dakota 40th in population (1960)
46	Daniel Inouye (D-HI)	January 3, 1963	Former representative (4 years) - Hawaii 43rd in population (1960)
47	Peter H. Dominick (R-CO)	January 3, 1963	Former representative (2 years)
48	Birch Bayh (D-IN)	January 3, 1963	
49	Gaylord Nelson (D-WI)	January 7, 1963	
50	Joseph Montoya (D-NM)	November 4, 1964	
51	Walter Mondale (D-MN)	December 30, 1964	
52	Paul Fannin (R-AZ)	January 3, 1965	
53	Harry F. Byrd, Jr. (I-VA)	November 12, 1965	
54	Robert P. Griffin (R-MI)	May 11, 1966	
55	Ernest Hollings (D-SC)	November 9, 1966	
56	Clifford Hansen (R-WY)	January 3, 1967	Former governor
57	Charles H. Percy (R-IL)	January 3, 1967	Illinois 4th in population (1960)
58	Edward Brooke (R-MA)	January 3, 1967	Massachusetts 9th in population (1960)
59	Howard Baker (R-TN)	January 3, 1967	Tennessee 17th in population (1960)
60	Mark Hatfield (R-OR)	January 10, 1967	
61	Marlow Cook (R-KY)	December 17, 1968	
62	Ted Stevens (R-AK)	December 24, 1968	
63	Thomas Eagleton (D-MO)	December 28, 1968	
64	Barry Goldwater (R-AZ)	January 3, 1969	Previously a senator
65	Richard Schweiker (R-PA)	January 3, 1969	Former representative (8 years) - Pennsylvania 3rd in population (1960)
66	Charles Mathias (R-MD)	January 3, 1969	Former representative (8 years) - Maryland 21st in population (1960)
67	Bob Dole (R-KS)	January 3, 1969	Former representative (8 years) - Kansas 29th in population (1960)
68	Edward J. Gurney (R-FL)	January 3, 1969	Former representative (6 years)
69	Harold Hughes (D-IA)	January 3, 1969	Former governor, Iowa 24th in population (1960)
70	Henry Bellmon (R-OK)	January 3, 1969	Former governor, Oklahoma 27th in population (1960)
71	Alan Cranston (D-CA)	January 3, 1969	California 2nd in population (1960)
72	William B. Saxbe (R-OH)	January 3, 1969	Ohio 5th in population (1960)
73	James Allen (D-AL)	January 3, 1969	Alabama 19th in population (1960)
74	Bob Packwood (R-OR)	January 3, 1969	Oregon 32nd in population (1960)
75	Mike Gravel (D-AK)	January 3, 1969	Alaska 50th in population (1969)
76	Adlai Stevenson III (D-IL)	November 17, 1970	
77	Bill Roth (R-DE)	January 1, 1971	
78	John V. Tunney (D-CA)	January 2, 1971	
79	Hubert Humphrey (D-MN)	January 3, 1971	Previously a senator
80	Robert Taft, Jr. (R-OH)	January 3, 1971	Former representative (8 years) - Ohio 5th in population (1960)
81	Bill Brock (R-TN)	January 3, 1971	Former representative (8 years) - Tennessee 17th in population (1960)
82	Lloyd Bentsen (D-TX)	January 3, 1971	Former representative (6 years)
83	John Glenn Beall, Jr. (R-MD)	January 3, 1971	Former representative (2 years) - Maryland 21st in population (1970)
84	Lowell Weicker (R-CT)	January 3, 1971	Former representative (2 years) - Connecticut 25th in population (1960)
85	James L. Buckley (C/R-NY)	January 3, 1971	New York 1st in population (1960)
86	Lawton Chiles (D-FL)	January 3, 1971	Florida 10th in population (1960)
87	Robert Stafford (R-VT)	September 16, 1971	
88	Sam Nunn (D-GA)	November 8, 1972	
89	Bennett Johnston Jr. (D-LA)	November 14, 1972	
90	William Hathaway (D-ME)	January 3, 1973	Former representative (8 years)
91	William L. Scott (R-VA)	January 3, 1973	Former representative (6 years)
92	James A. McClure (R-ID)	January 3, 1973	Former representative (4 years)
93	James Abourezk (D-SD)	January 3, 1973	Former representative (2 years)
94	Dewey F. Bartlett (R-OK)	January 3, 1973	Former governor
95	Jesse Helms (R-NC)	January 3, 1973	North Carolina 12th in population (1970)
96	Walter Huddleston (D-KY)	January 3, 1973	Kentucky 23rd in population (1970)
97	Richard C. Clark (D-IA)	January 3, 1973	Iowa 25th in population (1970)
98	Floyd K. Haskell (D-CO)	January 3, 1973	Colorado 30th in population (1970)
99	Pete Domenici (R-NM)	January 3, 1973	New Mexico 37th in population (1970)
100	Joe Biden (D-DE)	January 3, 1973	Delaware 46th in population (1970)
	Howard Metzenbaum (D-OH)	January 3, 1974	
	Paul Laxalt (R-NV)	December 18, 1974	
	Jake Garn (R-UT)	December 21, 1974	
	John Glenn (D-OH)	December 24, 1974	
	Wendell H. Ford (D-KY)	December 28, 1974	
	Louis C. Wyman (R-NH)	December 31, 1974	
	Richard Stone (D-FL)	January 1, 1975	

The most senior senators by class were John C. Stennis (D-Mississippi) from Class 1, James Eastland (D-Mississippi) from Class 2, and George Aiken (R-Vermont) from Class 3. Stennis was the most senior senator from his class while being the junior senator from his state.

== See also ==
- 93rd United States Congress
- List of United States representatives in the 93rd Congress
