= 1984 United States Senate election in Colorado =

- November 6, 1984
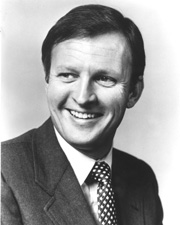

Nominee	William L. Armstrong	Nancy Dick
Party	Republican	Democratic
Popular vote	833,821	449,327
Percentage	64.25%	34.62%
- County results Armstrong: 40–50% 50–60% 60–70% 70–80% Dick: 50–60% 60–70%
U.S. senator before election
William L. Armstrong
Republican
Elected U.S. Senator
William L. Armstrong
Republican

The 1984 United States Senate election in Colorado was held on November 6, 1984. Incumbent Republican William L. Armstrong defeated Democratic nominee Nancy Dick with 64.25% of the vote. Armstrong carried all but three counties in the state, and to date is the last Republican Senate candidate to carry normally heavily Democratic Denver. This is the best ever performance by a Republican in a popular vote election in Colorado for the United States Senate.

== Primary elections ==
Primary elections were held on September 11, 1984.

=== Democratic primary ===
==== Candidates ====
- Nancy Dick, incumbent Lieutenant Governor
- Carlos F. Lucero, attorney

==== Results ====
Dick: 50–60%; 60–70%; 70–80%; 80–90%; Lucero: 50–60%; 60–70%; 70–80%; 80–90%

Democratic primary results
Party	Candidate	Votes	%
Democratic	Nancy Dick	78,248	50.97
Democratic	Carlos F. Lucero	75,277	49.03
Total votes		153,525	100.00

=== Republican primary ===
==== Candidates ====
- William L. Armstrong, incumbent United States Senator

==== Results ====
Republican primary results
Party	Candidate	Votes	%
Republican	William L. Armstrong (incumbent)	105,870	100.00
Total votes		105,870	100.00

== General election ==
=== Candidates ===
Major party candidates

- William L. Armstrong, Republican
- Nancy Dick, Democratic

Other candidates

- Craig Green, Libertarian
- David Martin, Socialist Workers
- Earl Higgerson, Prohibition

=== Results ===
1984 United States Senate election in Colorado
Party	Candidate	Votes	%	±%
Republican	William L. Armstrong (incumbent)	833,821	64.25%	
Democratic	Nancy Dick	449,327	34.62%	
Libertarian	Craig Green	11,077	0.85%	
Socialist Workers	David Martin	2,208	0.17%	
Prohibition	Earl Higgerson	1,376	0.11%	
Majority		384,494	29.63%	
Turnout		1,297,809	100.00%	
Republican hold		Swing		

== See also ==
- 1984 United States Senate elections
