= 1978 United States Senate election in Colorado =

- November 7, 1978
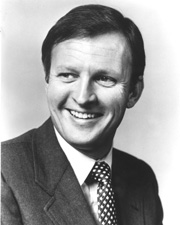

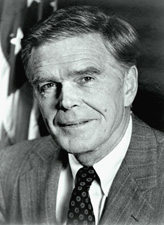
Nominee	William L. Armstrong	Floyd Haskell
Party	Republican	Democratic
Popular vote	480,801	330,148
Percentage	58.69%	40.30%
- County results Armstrong: 50–60% 60–70% 70–80% Haskell: 50–60% 60–70%
U.S. senator before election
Floyd Haskell
Democratic
Elected U.S. Senator
William L. Armstrong
Republican

The 1978 United States Senate election in Colorado took place on November 7, 1978. Incumbent Democratic Senator Floyd Haskell ran for re-election to a second term, but was soundly defeated by Republican U.S. Representative William L. Armstrong.

== Republican primary ==
=== Candidates ===
- William L. Armstrong, U.S. Representative from Littleton
- Jack Swigert, astronaut

==== Withdrew ====
- John Cogswell, lawyer and Bob Dole aide (endorsed Armstrong)

=== Results ===
Republican primary results
Party	Candidate	Votes	%
Republican	William L. Armstrong	109,021	73.45%
Republican	Jack Swigert	39,415	26.55%
Total votes		148,436	100.00%

== General election ==
=== Results ===
General election results
Party	Candidate	Votes	%	±%
Republican	William L. Armstrong	480,801	58.69%	▲10.52
Democratic	Floyd Haskell (incumbent)	330,148	40.30%	▼9.11
Independent	Veeder V. Dorn	5,789	0.71%	N/A
Prohibition	John Shue	2,518	0.31%	N/A
Total votes		819,256	100.00%	

== See also ==
- 1978 United States Senate elections
