= Elizabeth Hoffman (professor) =

American academic (born 1946)

Celia Elizabeth (Betsy) Hoffman
- Born: November 12, 1946 (age 79); Bryn Mawr, Pennsylvania
- Citizenship: United States
- Education: Smith College; University of Pennsylvania; California Institute of Technology
- Awards: Carolyn Shaw Bell Award, 2010 honorary doctorate from National University of Life and Environmental Sciences of Ukraine, 2011; Ronald H. Coase Prize in law and economics (joint with Matthew Spitzer), 1986
- Scientific career
- Fields: Economics
- Workplaces: Iowa State University; University of Colorado; University of Illinois at Chicago; University of Arizona; University of Wyoming; Purdue University; Northwestern University; University of Florida
- Website: https://www.econ.iastate.edu/people/elizabeth-hoffman

Celia Elizabeth (Betsy) Hoffman (born November 12, 1946) was executive vice president and provost of Iowa State University from 2007 to 2012, where she remains as professor of economics. From 2000 to 2005, she was president of the University of Colorado System, where she is president emerita. She is also a senior distinguished fellow at the Searle Center on Law, Regulations, and Economic Growth at Northwestern University School of Law, and serves on numerous for-profit and non-profit Boards. She served on the National Science Board from 2002 to 2008. Her published research is in the areas of Experimental economics, Cliometrics, and Behavioral Economics.

== Personal life ==
Hoffman was born in Bryn Mawr, Pennsylvania. Her maternal grandfather, Andre Kalpaschnikoff, had escaped the Russian Revolution. Her mother and aunt married brothers, and she spent her early years living in a large house in Wayne, Pennsylvania, a suburb of Philadelphia, with her grandmother, mother, father, aunt, uncle, sister, and their three double-cousins, before moving to suburban Berwyn, Pennsylvania. She is married to economist Brian R. Binger.

== Academic career ==
Hoffman graduated from Conestoga High School in 1964. She received a B.A. in history from Smith College in 1968 and is a member of its board of trustees. She received an M.A. in history from the University of Pennsylvania in 1969, a Ph.D. in history from the University of Pennsylvania in 1972, and a Ph.D. in social science (economics) from the California Institute of Technology in 1979.

While finishing her Ph.D. at Penn, she taught history and economics at St. Olaf College, Carleton College, and Macalester College. Her first academic position after completing her Ph.D. in history was as assistant professor of history at the University of Florida. She was recruited for the first class of economics PhD students at the California Institute of Technology, and then became assistant professor of economics at Northwestern University, assistant and associate professor of economics at Purdue University, and professor of economics at the University of Wyoming and professor of economics and law at the University of Arizona.

She was a founding trustee of the Cliometric Society, which focuses on quantitative studies in history; the Economic Science Association, which focuses on using experimental techniques to study economic phenomena; and the International Foundation for Research in Experimental Economics.

Her academic papers have more than 7000 total citations.

=== Selected works ===
- E Hoffman; K McCabe; K Shachat; V Smith (1994). "Preferences, property rights, and anonymity in bargaining games" (PDF). Games and Economic Behavior. 7 (3): 346–380. doi:10.1006/game.1994.1056. hdl:10535/5743. Archived from the original (PDF) on 2018-02-05.
- E Hoffman; K McCabe; VL Smith (1996). "Social distance and other-regarding behavior in dictator games". The American Economic Review. 86 (3): 653–660. JSTOR 2118218.
- E Hoffman, ML Spitzer (1985). "Entitlements, rights, and fairness: An experimental examination of subjects' concepts of distributive justice". The Journal of Legal Studies. 14 (2): 259–297. doi:10.1086/467773. JSTOR 724430. S2CID 54642825.

== Administrative career ==
In 1993, Hoffman became dean of the College of liberal arts and sciences at Iowa State University, where she was also professor of economics and psychology. In 1997, she became provost and vice chancellor for academic affairs at the University of Illinois at Chicago.

On September 1, 2000, Hoffman became the 20th president of the then four-campus University of Colorado system. She served in that role until 2005, when she resigned citing the distraction of multiple ongoing controversies. These included the university's alleged use of sex and alcohol to recruit football players, an alcohol-related student death at the Boulder campus, and the Ward Churchill essay controversy. When she received a demand from Governor Bill Owens to fire Ward Churchill, she refused on grounds of academic freedom. Her refusal drew her personally into the Churchill controversy, and she resigned soon afterward. She has since identified the dispute over Churchill as her reason for resigning.
