= 1972 United States Senate election in Colorado =

- November 7, 1972
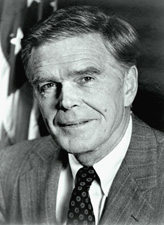

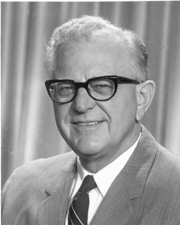
Nominee	Floyd Haskell	Gordon Allott
Party	Democratic	Republican
Popular vote	457,545	447,957
Percentage	49.41%	48.37%
- County results Haskell: 40–50% 50–60% 60–70% Allott: 40–50% 50–60% 60–70%
U.S. senator before election
Gordon Allott
Republican
Elected U.S. Senator
Floyd Haskell
Democratic

The 1972 United States Senate election in Colorado took place on November 7, 1972. Republican candidate and incumbent United States Senator Gordon Allott ran for re-election to a fourth term, but was narrowly defeated by Democratic candidate and former State Representative Floyd Haskell. This would be the last time until 2008 that a Democrat was elected to the Class 2 Senate seat from Colorado. Colorado was one of fifteen states, alongside Alabama, Arkansas, Delaware, Georgia, Iowa, Louisiana, Maine, Minnesota, Mississippi, Montana, New Hampshire, Rhode Island, South Dakota and West Virginia, that were won by Republican president Richard Nixon in 1972 that elected Democrats to the United States Senate.

== Democratic primary ==
=== Candidates ===
- Floyd Haskell, former Democratic state representative from Littleton
- Anthony Vollack, state senator from Arvada

=== Results ===
Floyd Haskell, a former state representative who had served as a Republican from 1965 to 1967, but had left the party in 1970 over opposition to the Vietnam War, won the primary.

1972 Democratic U.S. Senate primary
Party	Candidate	Votes	%
Democratic	Floyd Haskell	77,574	58.83%
Democratic	Anthony Vollack	54,298	41.18%
Total votes		131,872	100.00%

== General election ==
=== Results ===
General election results
Party	Candidate	Votes	%	±%
Democratic	Floyd Haskell	457,545	49.41%	▲7.48
Republican	Gordon Allott (incumbent)	447,957	48.37%	▼9.65
Raza Unida	Secundino Salazar	13,228	1.43%	N/A
American	Henry John Olshaw	7,353	0.79%	N/A
Total votes		926,083	100.00%	N/A
Democratic gain from Republican				

== See also ==
- 1972 United States Senate elections
