= Colorado Christian University =

Christian university in Lakewood, Colorado, US

- Former name: List: Denver Bible Institute (1914–1945); Denver Bible College (1945–1949); Rockmont College (1949–1985); Colorado Christian College (1985–1989); Colorado Baptist Junior College (1968–1985); Colorado Baptist University (1985–1989)
- Motto: χαρις και αληθεια (Grace and Truth)
- Type: Private university
- Established: 1914; 112 years ago
- Religious affiliation: Christian
- Academic affiliations: Council for Christian Colleges and Universities
- Endowment: $9.05 million (2023)
- President: Eric Hogue
- Students: 10,563 (Fall 2024)
- Undergraduates: 8,234 (Fall 2024)
- Postgraduates: 2,280 (Fall 2024)
- Other students: 49 (Fall 2024)
- Location: Lakewood, Colorado; 39°42′45.9″N 105°05′40.2″W
- Campus: Suburban
- Newspaper: CougMedia
- Colors: Navy blue, gold, capri
- Sporting affiliations: NCAA Division II – Rocky Mountain
- Mascot: Cougars
- Website: ccu.edu

Colorado Christian University (CCU) is a private Christian university in Lakewood, Colorado, United States. CCU was founded by Clifton Fowler in 1914 as the Denver Bible Institute.

== History ==
CCU's heritage dates back to the formation of Denver Bible Institute in 1914. By 1919 the institute had grown immensely, and the first permanent home location was purchased by Denver businessmen. In 1945, Denver Bible Institute was granted a state charter to become a four-year Bible college known as Denver Bible College. Expansion continued with the formulation of three main academic schools, including the college of liberal arts, the theological school, and the Bible institute. Denver Bible College became Rockmont College in 1949.

In 1981, Rockmont College was awarded accreditation by the North Central Association. It became Colorado Christian College after merging four years later with Western Bible College, known as Western Bible Institute before becoming a college in the 1970s. Colorado Christian College merged with Colorado Baptist University, in 1989, to become what is now Colorado Christian University.

CCU hosts the Western Conservative Summit in conjunction with their think tank The Centennial Institute.

== Campuses ==
The main campus of Colorado Christian University is located near the foothills of the Rocky Mountains in Lakewood, Colorado, a suburb 10 miles (16 km) west of Denver. The Lakewood campus houses CCU's college of undergraduate studies for traditional students as well as options for married student housing and graduate students. The university's college of adult and graduate studies has regional learning centers throughout Colorado: Denver Tech Center and Global Online Center (Englewood), Lakewood Center (Lakewood) Northern Colorado Regional Center (Loveland), Southern Colorado Regional Center (Colorado Springs), Sterling Center at Northeastern Junior College (Sterling), Western Colorado Regional Center (Grand Junction).

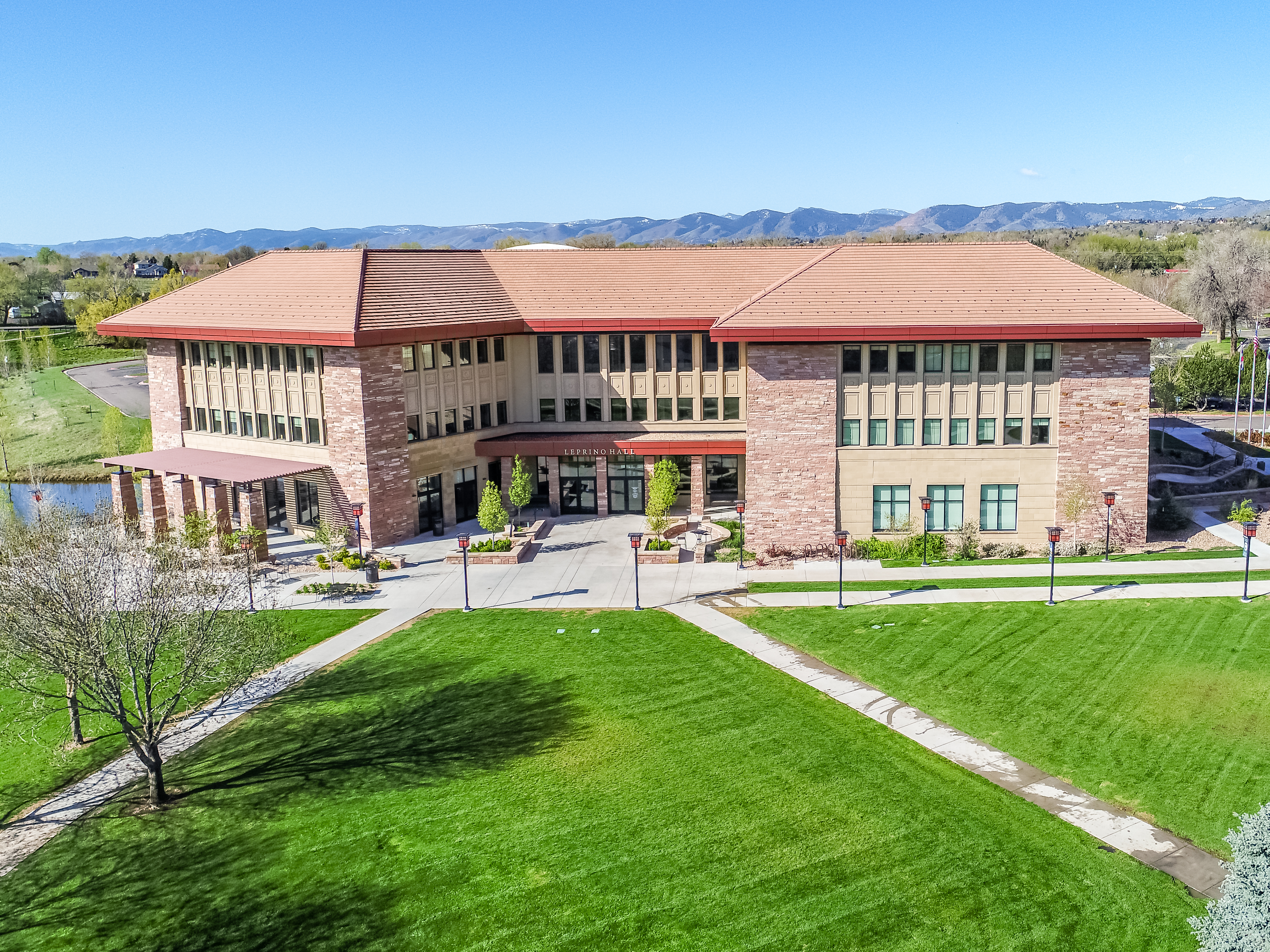
Leprino Hall

In 2002, CCU began searching for a new campus near Ken Caryl, Colorado, after attempting to develop their Foothills Campus near Morrison, Colorado. For over 40 years, CCU held classes on the 53-acre site, which the university shared with Christian radio station KWBI (later purchased by K-Love). Plans failed to rezone additional property at the site for future use, and it has since been abandoned and demolished.

=== Campus renovation ===
Colorado Christian University is currently undergoing a major campus renovation of their Lakewood, Colorado location. The renovation is scheduled to take 7–9 years to complete at a cost of over $120 million. In 2012, former CCU President William Armstrong spearheaded the campus renovation project. The university created the Armstrong Legacy initiative as an effort to secure $30.2 million for the Armstrong Center, and $19.2 million for our second new academic building. An additional $50 million will also be pursued to provide a new endowment fund for need-based student scholarships.

The new academic building, Leprino Hall, was opened in Fall 2014. This building is the first of the CCU renovation. The 43,000 square foot building cost $30 million to build and was completed in the summer of 2014.

CCU opened a new residence hall to students in August 2015. The new housing has been named "Yetter Hall" after the president of Rockmont College from 1954 to 1963, Archie Yetter. The residence hall houses around 300 students in 53 apartment units. Each unit includes three bedrooms, three bathrooms, a living room, full sized kitchen, and washer and dryers.

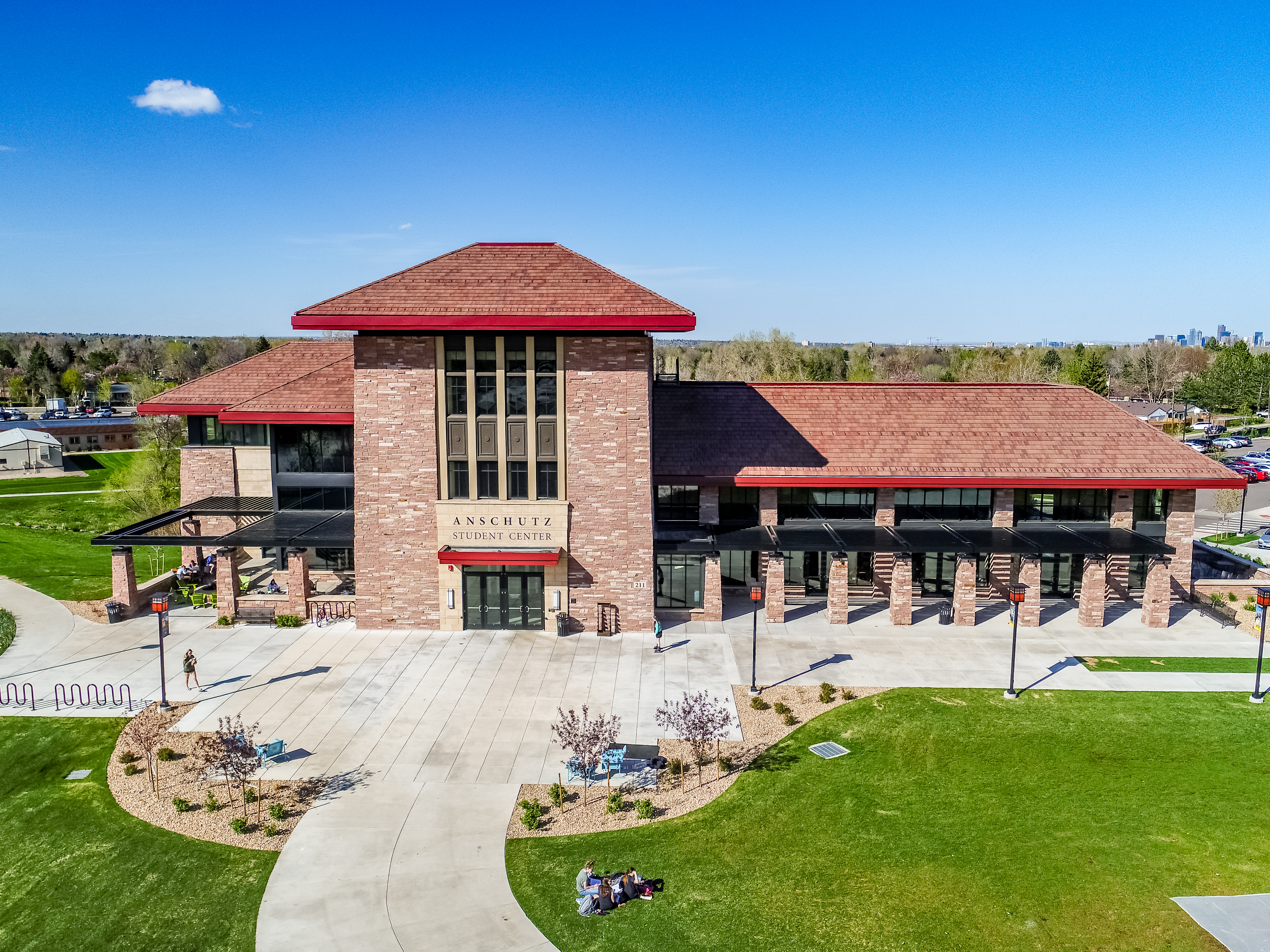
Anschutz Student Center

On August 24, 2017, the Anschutz Student Center opened. It is located at the center of CCU's campus and has 55,000 square feet of space, including food services, offices, and a gym. The Anschutz Student Center's upper floor is a hangout space for students and includes a game room, along with Student Life and Student Activities offices. The main floor of the student center has a canteen. The Great Room is available for different gatherings of students and visitors on campus.

Dedicated August 21, 2019, Rockmont Hall is the second new residence hall constructed as part of the university's campus redevelopment campaign. The 115,000-square-foot facility is named in honor of one of CCU's heritage institutions.

Fundraising is currently underway for the Armstrong Center. The facility will serve as the backbone of the academic quad; it will house the Lee Strobel Center for Evangelism and Applied Apologetics, the Clifton Fowler Library, and the university's first dedicated chapel space; and allow the School of Music to return to the heart of campus. Future plans also include the construction of a second dedicated academic building.

== Academics ==
The university comprises two colleges: the college of undergraduate studies and the college of adult and graduate studies. CCU offers over 100 degree programs as well as licensure and certification programs. The university is accredited by the Higher Learning Commission. It is also a member of the Council for Christian Colleges and Universities, the National Association of Independent Colleges and Universities, and the Council for Independent Colleges.

The college of undergraduate studies offers 30 academic majors as well as 37 minors. The college of undergraduate studies provides academic programs for traditional undergraduate students and also offers off-campus study opportunities through the Council for Christian Colleges and Universities' Best Semester Program, and Jerusalem University College in Israel.

The college of adult and graduate studies offers undergraduate degree completion, educator licensing, and certificate programs for working professionals. The college offers master's degrees and graduate certificate programs. Students may take courses through the College of Adult and Graduate Studies Centers throughout Colorado or through the college's Global Online Center.

According to the National Center for Education Statistics, the school has an open enrollment admissions policy; however, applicants are required to present a "strong spiritual recommendation" from a pastor, youth pastor, or "spiritual mentor", which can speak to their "Christian testimony and growth".

=== Rankings ===
In the 2020 U.S. News & World Report Best Colleges Ranking, Colorado Christian University ranked 68th in Regional Universities West, with an overall score of 38/100.

== Student life ==
=== Lifestyle covenant ===
All traditional undergraduate students are required to sign a "Lifestyle Covenant" to attend Colorado Christian University. The Lifestyle Covenant states a commitment "to educate men and women in the process of integrating their faith and education. This agreement also expresses our commitment to providing an atmosphere for study, personal exploration, involvement in interpersonal relationships, spiritual life, and growth that is conducive to students achieving goals, while enjoying living and learning in community". Those who sign the lifestyle covenant are required to attend church services and chapel. Additionally, students under the lifestyle covenant are expected to remain in compliance with federal, state, and local laws. Students who fail to sign the covenant are subject to immediate dismissal or suspension.

=== Chapel ===
Chapel attendance is required of all traditional undergraduate students who are taking 12 credit hours or more. Over a four-year period, 180 chapel credits are required to obtain clearance to graduate. For transfer students, or students who will graduate in less than four years, 45 credits per year of attendance at CCU is required.

=== Community service ===
CCU requires traditional undergraduate students to be involved in giving back to the community. In order to graduate from the traditional undergraduate college, every student must complete an average of 45 ministry hours per year for a total of 180 hours of service through a local or international ministry, non-profit organization or business during his or her college career."

=== Global outreach ===
Colorado Christian University sponsors several service-based, short-term mission trips through its CCU2theWorld organization. The affluence of the countries visited is wide-ranging, though emphasis is typically placed on helping the underprivileged. Over the past twenty years, CCU has sent over 270 short-term missionary teams to more than 60 countries around the world and throughout the United States.

=== Athletics ===
The CCU Cougars participate in both NCAA Division II and NCCAA (National Christian College Athletic Association). The Cougars compete in 15 intercollegiate sports, with over 200 athletes between the teams, and currently compete in the Rocky Mountain Athletic Conference. In 2016, the women's soccer team took part in the RMAC tournament. They went on to participate in the NCCAA (Division I) tournament in Kissimmee, Florida, where they won 1–0 against Oklahoma Baptist University.

== Notable alumni ==
- Jon Becker, Colorado State Representative
- Brian Brock, theologian
- Chris McClellan, American soccer player
- Dave Daniels, college basketball coach.
- Betty Sparrow Doris, former Secretary of Work Force Development, State of New Mexico
- John Eldredge, Christian author and founder of Ransomed Heart
- Brent Hobba, Australian basketball player
- Arturo Kinch, Costa Rican Olympic skier
- Kevin Lundberg, Colorado State Senator
- Leanor Ortega, saxophonist for Five Iron Frenzy and currently on staff with Scum of the Earth Church
- Chang Sho-wen, Taiwanese politician
- William Armstrong, U.S. Senator, CCU President 2006-2016
