= Floyd Haskell =

American politician (1916–1998)

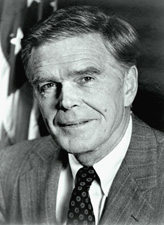

United States Senator from Colorado
- In office January 3, 1973 – January 3, 1979
- Preceded by: Gordon Allott
- Succeeded by: William L. Armstrong

Member of the Colorado House of Representatives
- In office 1965-1969

Personal details
- Born: Floyd Kirk Haskell; February 7, 1916 Morristown, New Jersey, U.S.
- Died: August 25, 1998 (aged 82) Washington, D.C., U.S.
- Party: Republican (before 1970); Democratic (1970–1998)
- Spouse(s): Eileen Nicoll (1941–1976; divorced; 3 children); Nina Totenberg (1979–1998; his death)
- Education: Harvard University

Military service
- Allegiance: United States
- Branch/service: United States Army
- Years of service: 1941–1945
- Rank: Major
- Battles/wars: World War II

Floyd Kirk Haskell (February 7, 1916 – August 25, 1998) was an American lawyer and politician. A member of the Democratic Party, he served as a U.S. senator from Colorado from 1973 to 1979.

== Early life and career ==
Floyd Haskell was born in Morristown, New Jersey, to Edward Kirk and Gladys (née Clarkson) Haskell. His father was an investment banker. He attended Harvard College, where he received a Bachelor of Arts degree in 1937. During college, he played on the football, rugby, and soccer teams, later developing as a tennis player, and was president of the Rocky Mountain Club. He received a law degree from Harvard Law School in 1941. That same year he married Eileen Nicoll, to whom he remained married until their divorce in 1976; they had three daughters, Ione, Evelyn, and Pamela.

During World War II, Haskell served in the U.S. Army from 1941 to 1945, seeing action in Asia, viewing the immediate aftermath of Hiroshima, and reaching the rank of major. He was awarded a Bronze Star Medal for his intelligence work. Following his military service, he was admitted to the bar in 1946 and moved to Denver, Colorado, where he worked as a tax lawyer.

In 1964, Haskell was elected as a Republican to the Colorado House of Representatives from Arapahoe County, serving until 1969. As a state legislator, he became assistant majority leader in 1967 and also served as chairman of the House Judiciary Committee and a member of the House Education and Finance Committees. In 1970, he left the Republican Party and became a Democrat in protest of President Richard Nixon's invasion of Cambodia.

== U.S. Senate ==
In 1972, Haskell decided to challenge three-term Republican incumbent Gordon L. Allott for a seat in the U.S. Senate. He defeated state Senator Anthony Vollack in the Democratic primary. In the general election, he narrowly won a four-way race between Allott and candidates from the Raza Unida Party and the American Independent Party, receiving only 49% of the vote. He defeated his closest competitor, Senator Allott, by less than 10,000 votes while President Nixon carried Colorado by over 267,000 votes.

Haskell was sworn into the Senate on January 3, 1973. He served as a member of the Senate Finance and Energy and Natural Resources Committees, where he earned a reputation as a tax reformer and an environmentalist. He supported the historic Alaska Lands legislation and regulation of auto emissions, the Panama Canal treaties, and alternative sources of energy. In 1978, lacking campaign funds and media acumen, he was defeated for re-election by Congressman William L. Armstrong, the first in Colorado to raise over a million dollars, losing by a landslide margin of 59%-40%.

== Later life and death ==
After his Senate career, Haskell established his residence in Washington, D.C., where he practiced law before joining Common Cause and a bipartisan group of retired lawmakers calling for campaign finance reform and an end to congressional gridlock. In 1979, he married Nina Totenberg, the legal affairs correspondent for National Public Radio; they remained married until his death in 1998.

Haskell suffered a cerebral hemorrhage in 1994 after falling on ice near his home in Washington. He died of pneumonia four years later, at age 82, while returning from a vacation in Maine with his wife.

U.S. Senate
Preceded by Gordon L. Allott	U.S. senator (Class 2) from Colorado; 1973–1979; Served alongside: Peter H. Dominick, Gary Hart	Succeeded by William L. Armstrong
Party political offices
Preceded by Roy Romer	Democratic Party nominee for United States Senator from Colorado (Class 2); 1972, 1978	Succeeded by Nancy Dick
