= James Paul Johnson =

American politician (1930–2023)

James P. Johnson
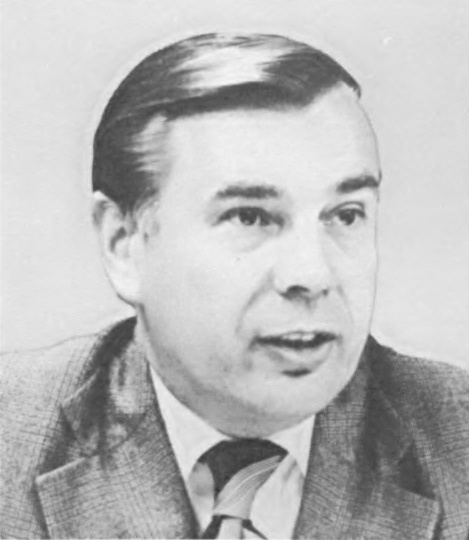

Member of the Colorado Water Conservation Board
- In office 1985–1987
- Governor: Richard Lamm; Roy Romer

Member of the Colorado Supreme Judicial Court Nominating Commission
- In office 1984–1986
- Governor: Richard Lamm

Member of the U.S. House of Representatives from Colorado's 4th district
- In office January 3, 1973 – January 3, 1981
- Preceded by: Wayne Aspinall
- Succeeded by: Hank Brown

Judge of the Ault Municipal Court
- In office 1962–1965

Personal details
- Born: James Paul Johnson; June 2, 1930 Yankton, South Dakota, U.S.
- Died: November 16, 2023 (aged 93) Fort Collins, Colorado, U.S.
- Party: Republican
- Education: Northwestern University (BA); University of Colorado (LLB)
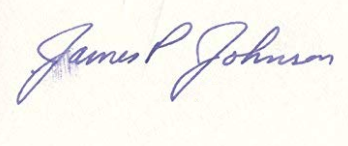
- Signature

Military service
- Allegiance: United States
- Branch/service: United States Marine Corps
- Years of service: 1952–1956
- Battles/wars: Korean War

James Paul Johnson (June 2, 1930 – November 16, 2023) was an American politician, lawyer and jurist from Colorado. He served four terms in the United States House of Representatives as a Republican from 1973 to 1981.

== Early life and career ==
Johnson was born in Yankton, South Dakota, on June 2, 1930, to Fred and Evelyn Johnson. He earned his B.A. from Northwestern University in 1952 and later earned an LL.B. from the University of Colorado where he served on the board of editors for Volume 31 of the Rocky Mountain Law Review (now the University of Colorado Law Review). He graduated from law school in 1959.

In 1952, Johnson enlisted into the United States Marine Corps, where he was a first lieutenant, and served as a jet pilot during the Korean War from 1952 to 1956. Johnson met Nancy Brown, with whom he had two children, at Northwestern University and married on the same day of their graduation. They moved to Fort Collins, Colorado in 1959.

Johnson was admitted to the Colorado Bar in 1959 and briefly served in private practice prior to being named a deputy district attorney for the Eighth Judicial District of Colorado from 1959 to 1966. He was the Municipal Judge for Ault, Colorado from 1962 to 1965, and assistant district attorney from 1964 to 1966.

== Political career ==
Johnson served as member of the Poudre R-1 School Board, Fort Collins from 1969 to 1971 and served as delegate to Colorado State Republican conventions from 1960 to 1972.

Johnson unsuccessfully ran for a seat in the United States House of Representatives in the 1966 election. He campaigned in opposition to the Vietnam War.

=== Congress ===
During the 1972 elections he was elected to the House of Representatives and served until 1981. In February 1978, he apologized for stating that President "Carter didn't declare war on the West(ern United States) he bombed us without a declaration of war." in response to Carter's water project policies.

== Later life and death ==
After leaving office he resumed practicing law in Fort Collins, Colorado. He served as member of the supreme court judicial nominating commission for state of Colorado from 1984 to 1986 and also served as a member of the Colorado Water Conservation Board from 1985 to 1987.

Johnson died on November 16, 2023, at the age of 93.

== Electoral history ==
James Paul Johnson electoral history

1966 Colorado 4th Congressional District election
Party	Candidate	Votes	%	±%
Democratic	Wayne N. Aspinall (incumbent)	84,107	58.61%	−4.41%
Republican	James Paul Johnson	59,404	41.39%	+4.41%
Total votes		'143,511'	'100.00%'	

1972 Colorado 4th Congressional District election
Party	Candidate	Votes	%	±%
Republican	James Paul Johnson	94,994	51.03%	+6.11%
Democratic	Alan Merson	91,151	48.97%	−6.11%
Total votes		'186,145'	'100.00%'	

1974 Colorado 4th Congressional District election
Party	Candidate	Votes	%	±%
Republican	James Paul Johnson (incumbent)	82,982	52.05%	+1.02%
Democratic	John Carroll	76,452	47.95%	−1.02%
Total votes		'159,434'	'100.00%'	

1976 Colorado 4th Congressional District election
Party	Candidate	Votes	%	±%
Republican	James Paul Johnson (incumbent)	119,458	54.05%	+2.00%
Democratic	Daniel Ogden	76,995	34.84%	−13.11%
Independent	Dick Davis	20,398	9.23%	+9.23%
Independent	Henry Thiel	4,167	1.89%	+1.89%
Total votes		'221,018'	'100.00%'	

1978 Colorado 4th Congressional District election
Party	Candidate	Votes	%	±%
Republican	James Paul Johnson (incumbent)	103,121	61.18%	+7.13%
Democratic	Morgan Smith	65,421	38.82%	+3.98%
Total votes		'168,542'	'100.00%'	

U.S. House of Representatives
Preceded by Wayne Aspinall	Member of the U.S. House of Representatives from Colorado's 4th congressional district 1973–1981	Succeeded by Hank Brown
