= William L. Armstrong =

American politician (1937–2016)

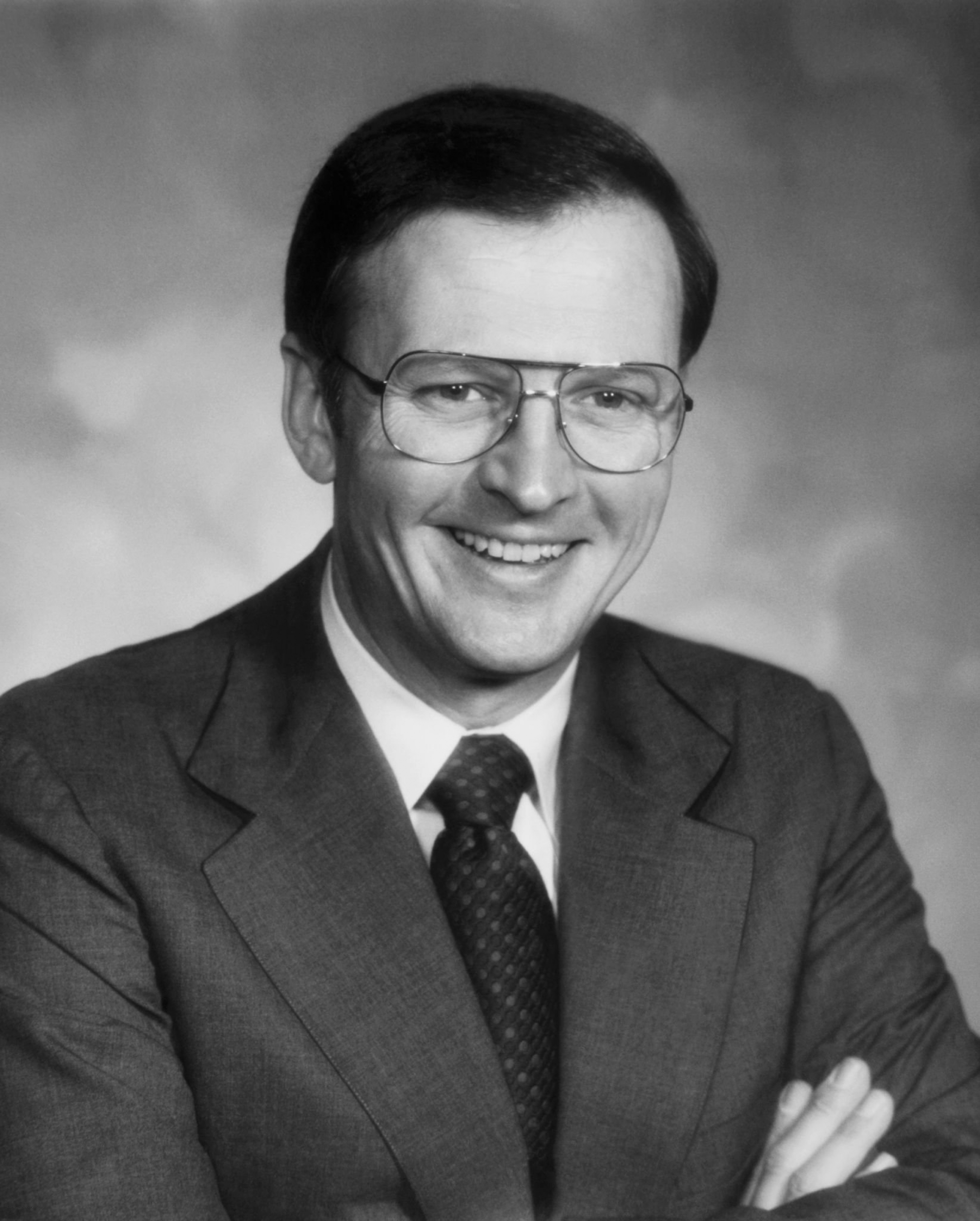
- Official portrait, 1983

President of Colorado Christian University
- In office August 2006 – July 5, 2016
- Preceded by: Larry Donnithorne
- Succeeded by: Donald W. Sweeting

United States Senator from Colorado
- In office January 3, 1979 – January 3, 1991
- Preceded by: Floyd Haskell
- Succeeded by: Hank Brown
Senate positions
Chair of the Senate Republican Policy Committee
In office January 3, 1985 – January 3, 1991
Leader	Bob Dole
Preceded by	John Tower
Succeeded by	Don Nickles

Member of the U.S. House of Representatives from Colorado's 5th district
- In office January 3, 1973 – January 3, 1979
- Preceded by: District established
- Succeeded by: Ken Kramer

Member of the Colorado Senate
- In office January 6, 1965 – January 3, 1973
- Constituency: 20th (1965–1969); 22nd (1969–1973)

Member of the Colorado House of Representatives from the Arapahoe County district
- In office January 6, 1963 – January 6, 1965

Personal details
- Born: William Lester Armstrong Jr. March 16, 1937 Fremont, Nebraska, U.S.
- Died: July 5, 2016 (aged 79) Denver, Colorado, U.S.
- Resting place: Fairmount Cemetery
- Party: Republican
- Spouse: Ellie M. Eaton
- Children: 2
- Education: Tulane University; University of Minnesota, Twin Cities

Military service
- Allegiance: United States
- Branch/service: United States Army
- Years of service: 1957–1963
- Rank: First Lieutenant
- Unit: Army National Guard

William Lester Armstrong Jr. (March 16, 1937 – July 5, 2016) was an American businessman, administrator, and politician. He was a member of the Republican Party and served as a United States representative and senator from Colorado.

== Early life and career ==
Armstrong was born March 16, 1937, in Fremont, Nebraska, and graduated from Lincoln Northeast High School. He was the son of William Lester Armstrong and Dorothy Steen Armstrong. His maternal grandfather was a Presbyterian minister and his great-great-uncle, Alexander Majors, was the co-founder of the Pony Express, the Central Overland California, and Pike's Peak Express Company.

== Professional career ==
Armstrong became fascinated as a child with radio, and at the age of eleven, he interviewed with a local radio station in Fremont and was given his own show on weekends to practice his DJ skills.

After high school, he met Todd Storz, known as the father of the Top 40 radio format. He hired Armstrong at KOWH in Omaha, Nebraska, then transferred him to WTIX in New Orleans, where he became America's first teenage Top 40 disc jockey. While there, he briefly attended Tulane University, but two years later, in 1956, he moved to Minneapolis to work at WDGY. There he took classes at the University of Minnesota but did not earn a degree. Within a few months, he was appointed Program Director at the radio station, at the age of 20. He then chose to enlist in the Colorado Army National Guard from 1957 to 1963, where he became a First Lieutenant.

After returning from duty at age 22 in 1959, Armstrong bought radio station KOSI-AM in Aurora, Colorado, which became KEZW in 1981. Armstrong founded KOSI-FM in 1968 before selling both the KOSI-AM and KOSI-FM stations 25 years later. He also was president of Ambassador Media, which owned television station KPVI in Pocatello, Idaho and satellite stations KKVI in Twin Falls, Idaho and KJVI in Jackson, Wyoming.

== Political career ==
In 1962, Armstrong married Ellen M. Eaton. The same year, he became the (at the time) youngest person ever elected to the Colorado House of Representatives, where he served one term. He then served in the Colorado State Senate from 1964 to 1972, including two terms as President of the Senate. In 1972, Armstrong was elected to the U.S. Congress from the new fifth district. He was reelected to the 94th and 95th Congresses.

In 1978, Armstrong was elected to the U.S. Senate, defeating former astronaut Jack Swigert in the GOP primary in September, and Democratic incumbent Floyd Haskell in November. He and Swigert became good friends and Armstrong was with the former astronaut when he died from cancer in December 1982. Reelected in 1984, he served in the Senate for twelve years. Armstrong served on the Banking, Finance, and Budget Committees, and was noted for his successful effort to index personal income tax rates to the rate of inflation. Majority Leader Robert 'Bob' Dole later referred to Armstrong as "the father of tax indexing". In 1980, Armstrong actively worked to make GI Bill benefits permanent for U.S. military personnel. In February 1982, Senator Armstrong, alongside Congressman Carlos Moorhead sponsored the resolution S.J. Res 165 authorizing and requesting the President to proclaim 1983 as the "Year of the Bible". President Ronald Reagan implemented the resolution as Public Law 97-280. Following the formal designation of 1983 being the Year of the Bible, Armstrong served on the newly created National Committee to help focus attention on the year-long observance.

In 1983, Armstrong chaired the Senate Finance Subcommittee on Social Security, and served on the National Commission on Social Security Reform, which was created to find solutions to the long-term financing of the program. He was the only Commission member to vote against its final 1983 report because it failed to include any change in the eligible retirement age, though his view prevailed in the final legislation enacted by Congress. Also in 1983, Armstrong wrote the foreword to Daniel O. Graham's book on Project High Frontier, "We Must Defend America and Put an End to MADness." In the foreword, Armstrong criticizes the U.S. policy of Mutual Assured Destruction and advocates for a new policy, specifically that advocated by Project High Frontier, for defense against the Soviet Union's Intercontinental Ballistic Missiles.

During his time in office, Senator Armstrong worked on welfare reform. He supported the passage of the Family Support Act 1988, the first change in welfare rules in 50 years. Working with Senator Daniel Patrick Moynihan, and Governors Bill Clinton (D-AR), and Mike Castle (R-DE), the final bill passed the Senate by a vote of 93–3. The new law imposed work requirements (16 hours/week) on able-bodied welfare recipients for the first time. The bill also extended welfare benefits for unemployed 2-parent families and included the child support enforcement provision backed by Armstrong, a requirement for minor parents to be in school, and a screening process intended to reduce fraudulent claims.

In 1985, one of Armstrong's strong symbolic achievements was the Korean War Veterans Memorial Act, which he introduced. He sponsored the Senate bill to authorize the privately funded memorial, which passed in 1986. After its passage, he participated in numerous fund-raising efforts over the next decade, working closely with long-time friend and Korean War veteran, Congressman Mike McKevitt. The last bill Armstrong introduced before retiring from the Senate authorized the U.S. Mint to issue a silver dollar commemorating the war's 38th anniversary, with proceeds from sales (which eventually totaled over $22 million) helping finance the memorial. The bill passed and was sent to the President just three days before Armstrong's farewell speech to the Senate. Senator Armstrong opposed congressional pay raises and was critical of Senators who voted to raise pay, or on one occasion allowed a 50% pay raise to take effect without a vote. He was also noted in the early 1980s for sponsorship of a landmark soil conservation measure known as the "Sodbuster bill," which denied federal subsidies for plowing fragile grasslands. It was adopted as part of the 1985 Farm Bill.

He was the chairman of the Republican Policy Committee (99th through 101st Congresses); he opted to retire and did not seek reelection in 1990.

Throughout 1986, there was considerable speculation about Armstrong running for President in 1988.

=== Election results ===
==== 1972 ====
United States House of Representatives elections, 1972
Party	Candidate	Votes	%
Republican	Bill Armstrong	104,214	62.3
Democratic	Byron L. Johnson	60,948	36.5
Libertarian	Pipp M. Boyls	2,028	1.2
Total votes		167,190	100.0
Republican win (new seat)			

==== 1974 ====
United States House of Representatives elections, 1974
Party	Candidate	Votes	%
Republican	Bill Armstrong (incumbent)	85,326	57.73
Democratic	Ben Galloway	56,888	38.49
Independent	Stan Johnson	5,580	3.78
Total votes		147,794	100.0
Republican hold			

==== 1976 ====
United States House of Representatives elections, 1976
Party	Candidate	Votes	%
Republican	Bill Armstrong (incumbent)	126,784	66.43
Democratic	Dorothy Hores	64,067	33.57
Total votes		190,851	100.0
Republican hold			

==== 1978 ====
1978 United States Senate election in Colorado
Party	Candidate	Votes	%
Republican	William L. Armstrong	480,801	58.7%
Democratic	Floyd Haskell (Incumbent)	330,148	40.3%
United States Party	Vedder V. Dorn	5,789	0.7%
National Statesman	John Shue	2,518	0.3%
Turnout		819,256	
Republican gain from Democratic			

==== 1984 ====
1984 United States Senate election in Colorado
Party	Candidate	Votes	%	±%
Republican	William L. Armstrong	833,821	64.25%	
Democratic	Nancy Dick	449,327	34.62%	
Libertarian	Craig Green	11,077	0.85%	
Socialist Workers	David Martin	2,208	0.17%	
Prohibition	Earl Higgerson	1,376	0.11%	
Turnout		1,297,809		

== Personal life ==
=== Religion ===
In the 1970s, Armstrong experienced a religious conversion. After that experience, he said, he became "more tolerant of other people's opinions" and "didn't believe being a politician and a Christian were mutually exclusive". He then began 40 years of active involvement in evangelicalism in the United States.

In 1982, he served as the general chairman of the National Prayer Breakfast, and alongside President Ronald Reagan, delivered the keynote address at the 1988 National Prayer Breakfast. Speaking at religious gatherings, he often related the story of how a stranger came to see him in the Capitol and led him to the four spiritual laws. The four spiritual laws are based on the famous booklet by Bill Bright, founder of Campus Crusade for Christ. He held daily Bible studies with his family, began leading meetings with prayers, and shared his experience very publicly. Within congress, colleagues called Armstrong for legislative support as well as spiritual guidance. He believed his political and cultural undertakings were "vulcanized" inseparably to his Christian faith. He was a part of the Family Channel, Christian Businessmen's Committee, Trinity Forum, Christian Embassy, The Calling, and Charles Colson's Prison Fellowship. He was on the Board of Directors of Campus Crusade for Christ for 15 years.

=== Family ===
With his wife, he had two children, Wil Armstrong and Anne Sellman. Armstrong died from cancer at the age of 79 in 2016.

== Academic career ==
Armstrong was President of Colorado Christian University at the time of his death, having served in that position since 2006. During his tenure as president, Armstrong became well known for his catchphrase "Jesus, Jesus, Jesus." His involvement in Christian organizations and the national evangelical movement became a notable aspect of his legacy and his impact on others. Although he eventually held eight honorary degrees, he never finished college. The William L. Armstrong Award, given annually by the Centennial Institute at Colorado Christian University, is named in his honor.

U.S. House of Representatives
New constituency	Member of the U.S. House of Representatives from Colorado's 5th congressional district 1973–1979	Succeeded by Ken Kramer
Party political offices
Preceded by Gordon L. Allott	Republican nominee for U.S. Senator from Colorado (Class 2); 1978, 1984	Succeeded by Hank Brown
Preceded by John Tower	Chair of the Senate Republican Policy Committee; 1985–1991	Succeeded by Don Nickles
U.S. Senate
Preceded by Floyd K. Haskell	U.S. Senator (Class 2) from Colorado; 1979–1991; Served alongside: Gary Hart, Tim Wirth	Succeeded by Hank Brown
Honorary titles
Preceded by Larry Donnithorne	President of Colorado Christian University; 2006–2016	Succeeded by Donald W. Sweeting
