= Greg Lopez =

American politician (born 1964)

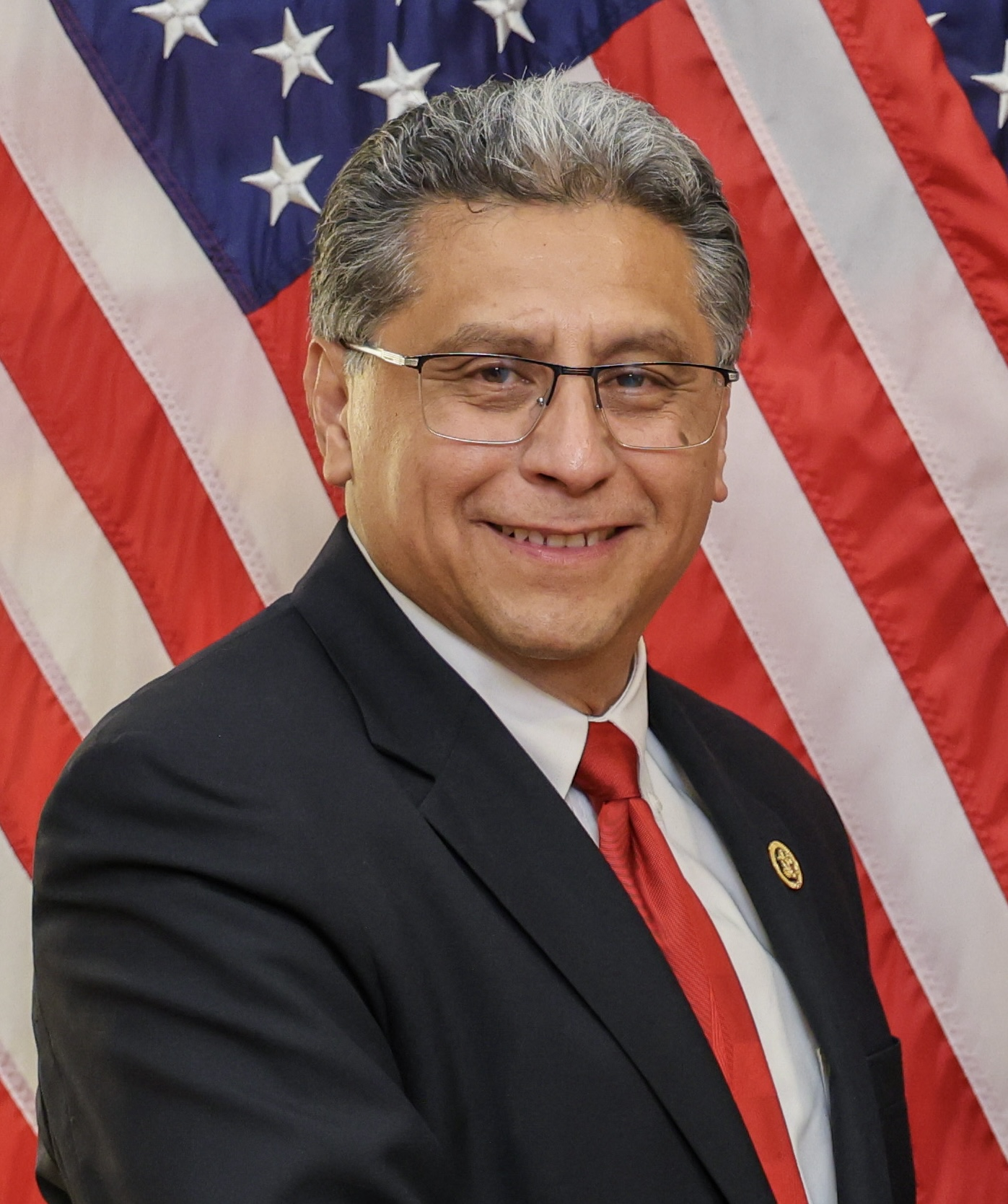
- Lopez in 2024

Member of the U.S. House of Representatives from Colorado's 4th district
- In office June 25, 2024 – January 3, 2025 (Note: Lopez's official service begins on the date of the special election, while he was not sworn in until July 8, 2024.)
- Preceded by: Ken Buck
- Succeeded by: Lauren Boebert

Mayor of Parker
- In office December 1992 – December 1996
- Preceded by: Ann Waterman
- Succeeded by: Gary Lasater

Personal details
- Born: Gregorio Beltran Lopez; June 7, 1964 (age 62) Dallas, Texas, U.S.
- Party: Democratic (before 1994); Republican (1994–2026); Independent (2026–present)
- Spouse: Lisa Garcia (m. 1988)
- Children: 2
- Education: New Mexico State University, Alamogordo (AAS)

Military service
- Branch/service: United States Air Force
- Years of service: 1983–1987

Gregorio Beltran Lopez (born June 7, 1964) is an American politician who served as the U.S. representative for Colorado's 4th congressional district from 2024 to 2025. From 2008 to 2014, he served as the Small Business Administration's Colorado director. He previously served as mayor of Parker, Colorado, and ran for Governor in 2018 and 2022. He was the Republican nominee for the 2024 special election in Colorado's 4th congressional district to replace Ken Buck, who resigned in March 2024. He did not run in the general election for a full term. He was elected to the United States House of Representatives in June 2024. He was an independent candidate for governor of Colorado in the 2026 election.

== Early life and education ==
A third-generation Mexican American, Lopez grew up in Irving, Texas, with parents and grandparents who were farm workers. Lopez joined the United States Air Force upon graduating from high school and used the military benefits to pay for an associate's degree in business administration from New Mexico State University Alamogordo. Lopez and his wife, Lisa, moved from Texas to Colorado in 1988.

== Career ==
Lopez served in the United States Air Force 1983 to 1987 as a weapon specialist at Holloman Air Force Base. In that role, he prepared airplanes for flight and left active service after sustaining significant hearing loss from airfield work.

=== Mayor of Parker ===
Lopez was elected Mayor of Parker at 27 years old in 1992 as a Democrat, but switched parties in 1994. As Mayor, Lopez was for managed development and growth.

=== Small Business Administration ===
Lopez was the Colorado director for the Small Business Administration in 2008. He served until 2014.

==== Department of Justice investigation ====
In 2020, the United States Department of Justice pursued a civil case alleging Lopez had improperly tried to influence former SBA colleagues years earlier, after his departure from the agency. The case centered on an email and two phone calls, where he had asked a former colleague would look into the status of an open case. Lopez agreed to pay $15,000 to settle the case.

=== Political campaigns ===
==== 1998 ====
Lopez ran for the open 30th district of the Colorado State Senate in 1998, but placed fourth in the Republican primary behind John Evans, Ted Harvey, and Gayle Elton Wintors II respectively.

==== 2016 ====
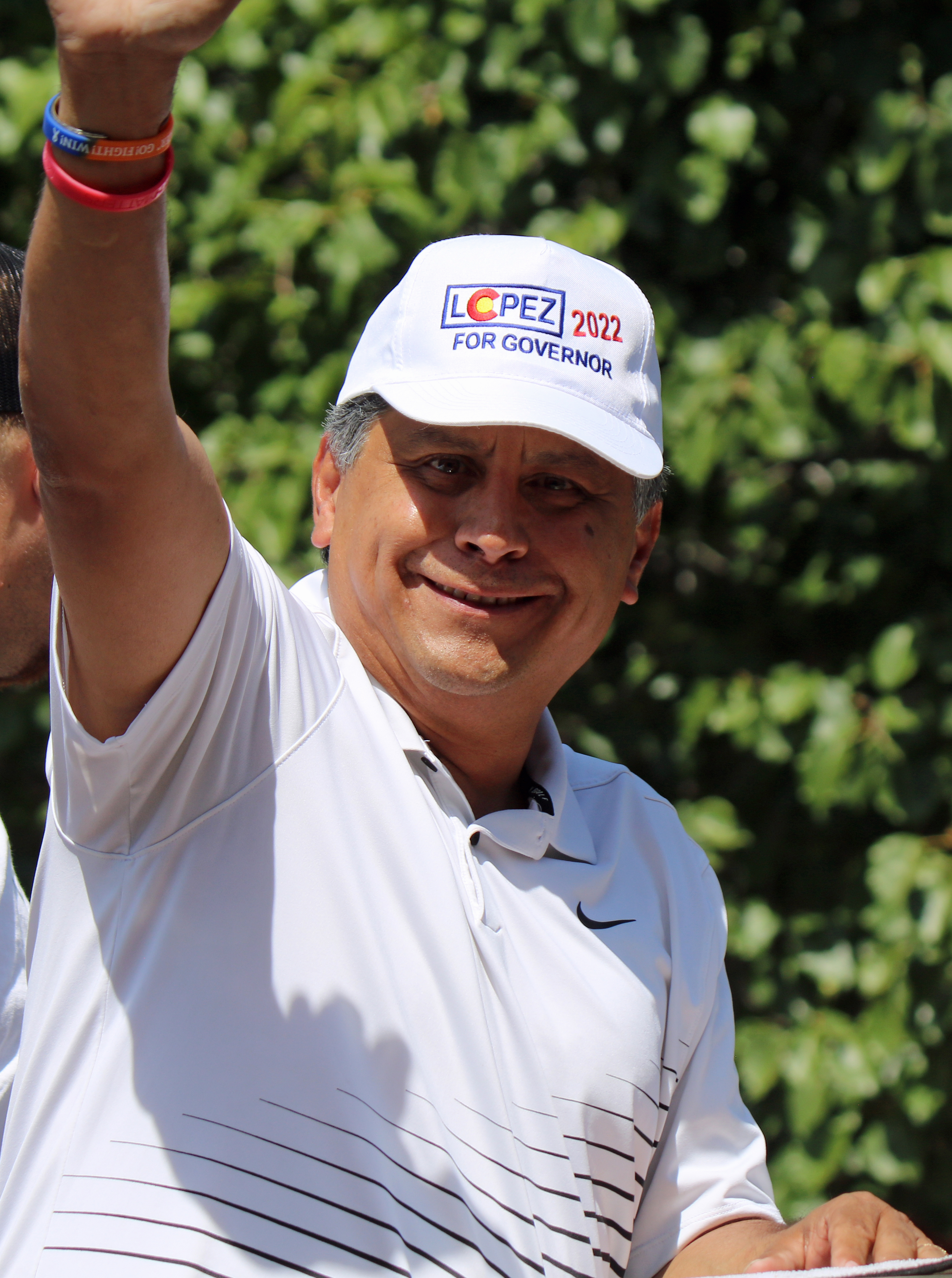
Lopez campaigning for governor in August 2021

Lopez announced a campaign for the Republican nomination for U.S. Senate in 2016, but ultimately withdrew before the election.

==== 2018 ====
Lopez first ran for Governor in 2018. He placed third in the Republican primary with 13.20% of the vote.

==== 2022 ====
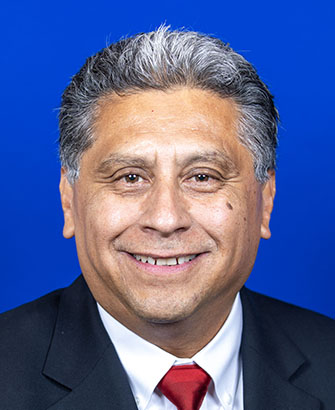
Lopez's official Congressional portrait

Lopez campaigned again for the Republican nomination in 2022. In the campaign, he stated he wanted to outlaw abortions without exceptions, denied man-made climate change, and alleged that the 2020 election was won by Trump and stolen. He lost the primary to Heidi Ganahl by seven points.

==== 2026 ====
In April 2025, Lopez announced his candidacy for Governor of the state of Colorado. Initially running as a Republican, Lopez announced he had left the GOP and was mounting an independent campaign for governor in January 2026.

=== U.S. House of Representatives ===
==== 2024 special election ====
Lopez was selected as the Republican nominee for the 2024 special election in Colorado's 4th congressional district caused by incumbent Ken Buck's resignation. He won the nomination in the sixth round of voting by a nomination committee, beating Logan County Commissioner Jerry Sonnenberg by a vote of 51 to 46. Much of Lopez's pitch to the committee voters was as a placeholder candidate. His selection as the nominee over Sonnenberg, a candidate running in the regular primary in the 4th district, was considered a boon to Lauren Boebert, who won that regular primary (after moving from the 3rd district); she was running for the full term but not in the special election, as she already enjoyed incumbent status. Lopez faced Democratic nominee Trisha Calvarese, Libertarian nominee Hannah Goodman, and Approval Voting nominee Frank Atwood, in the June 25 special general election, and expectedly won by a comfortable margin due to the district's strong Republican lean.

==== Tenure ====
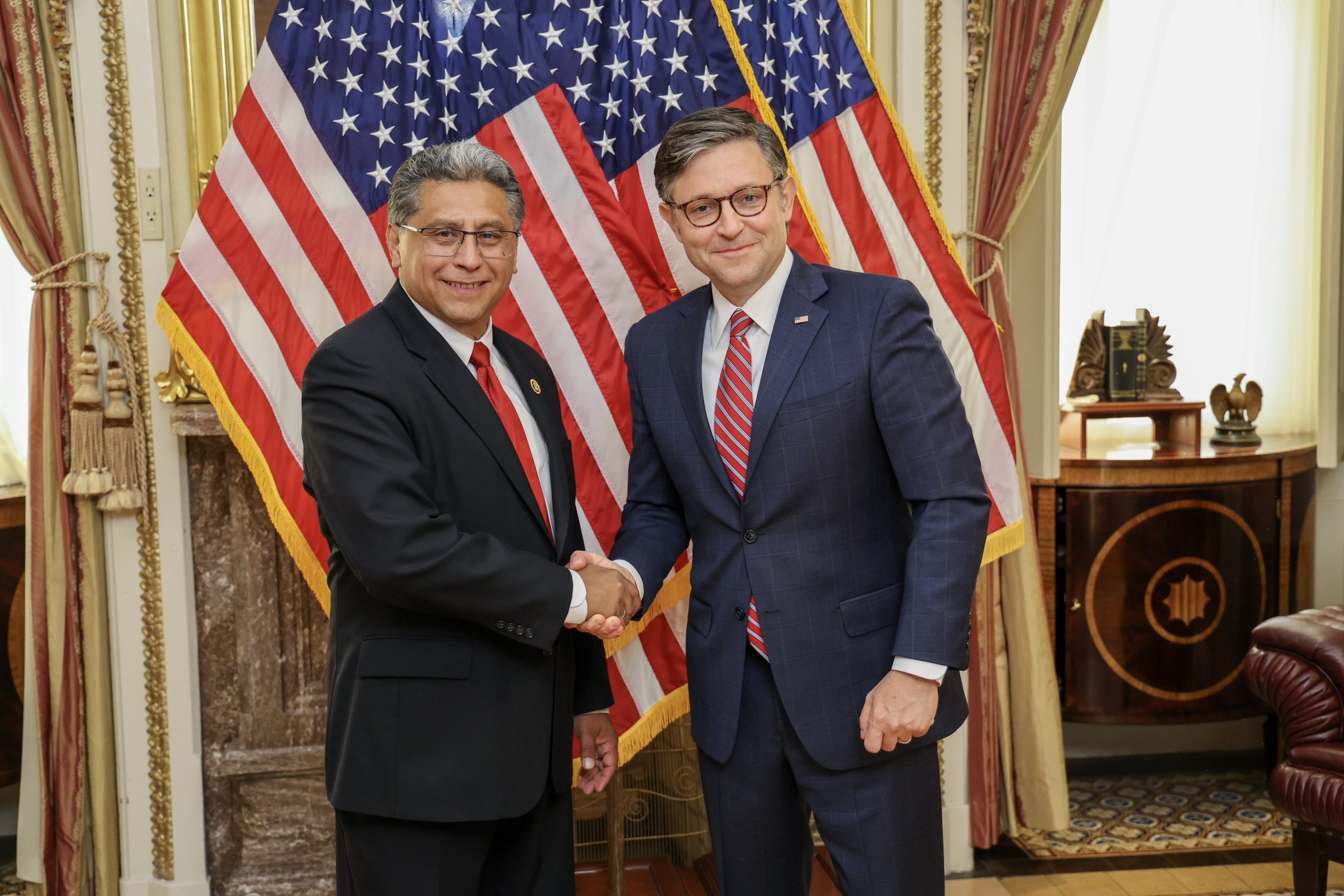
Lopez shaking hands with Speaker Mike Johnson after being sworn in

Following his victory, Lopez penned an op-ed in The Denver Post, pledging to not "buy, sell, or trade individual stocks" while in Congress, and to not miss any votes. He was sworn in on July 8, 2024.

== Electoral history ==
=== 1998 ===
1998 Colorado State Senate District 30 election, Republican primary
Party	Candidate	Votes	%
Republican	John Evans	3,783	31.74
Republican	Ted Harvey	3,234	27.13
Republican	Gayle Elton Wintors II	2,587	21.70
Republican	Greg Lopez	2,306	19.35
Total votes		11,919	100.0

=== 2018 ===
2018 Colorado gubernatorial election, Republican primary
Party	Candidate	Votes	%
Republican	Walker Stapleton	239,415	47.66
Republican	Victor Mitchell	151,365	30.13
Republican	Greg Lopez	66,330	13.20
Republican	Doug Robinson	45,245	9.01
Total votes		502,355	100.0

=== 2022 ===
2022 Colorado gubernatorial election, Republican primary results
Party	Candidate	Votes	%
Republican	Heidi Ganahl	341,157	53.87%
Republican	Greg Lopez	292,187	46.13%
Total votes		633,344	100.0%

=== 2024 ===
Republican convention results
Candidate	First ballot		Second ballot		Third ballot		Fourth ballot		Fifth ballot		Sixth ballot	
Candidate	Votes	%	Votes	%	Votes	%	Votes	%	Votes	%	Votes	%
Greg Lopez	12	12.2%	17	17.3%	27	27.6%	34	34.7%	45	45.9%	51	52.6%
Jerry Sonnenberg	23	23.5%	24	24.5%	24	32.6%	24	24.5%	30	30.6%	46	47.4%
Ted Harvey	24	24.5%	27	27.6%	24	24.5%	26	26.5%	23	23.5%	Eliminated	
Richard Holtorf	12	12.2%	13	13.3%	16	16.3%	14	14.3%	Eliminated			
Mike Lynch	11	11.2%	10	10.2%	7	7.1%	Eliminated					
Scott Melbye	10	10.2%	7	7.1%	Eliminated							
Chris Phelen	6	6.1%	Eliminated									
Floyd Trujillo	0	0.0%	Eliminated									
Peter Yu	0	0.0%	Withdrawn									

2024 Colorado's 4th congressional district special election
Party	Candidate	Votes	%
Republican	Greg Lopez	100,068	58.40%
Democratic	Trisha Calvarese	59,003	34.43%
Libertarian	Hannah Goodman	9,065	5.29%
Approval Voting	Frank Atwood	3,224	1.88%
Total votes		171,360	100.00%
Republican hold			

== Personal life ==
Lopez lives in Elizabeth, Colorado, with his wife, Lisa Garcia. The couple have two adult children, Michael and Christina. He is partially deaf, having no hearing in his right ear.

=== Legal troubles ===
In 1993, Lopez's wife called the police alleging domestic violence. She reportedly told police that she first struck Lopez, who then pushed her to the ground, kicked her, and attempted to drag her by the hair. The pair both pled guilty to a single charge of harassment. Despite the incident, they remain married and she stated she regrets the ensuing media coverage.

In 2003, Lopez was charged with a DUI and stated the incident had cost him nearly $10,000. In 2020, Lopez settled for $15,000 in a civil case brought by the Department of Justice for improperly trying to influence his colleagues at the SBA.

When asked by an interviewer in 2022 about his numerous run-ins with the law, Lopez said "There's only been one perfect man that's ever walked this earth, and we nailed him to the cross, I'm not a perfect man. I've made my mistakes. But I've learned from them."

== See also ==
- List of Hispanic and Latino Americans in the United States Congress

U.S. House of Representatives
Preceded by Ken Buck	Member of the U.S. House of Representatives from Colorado's 4th congressional district 2024–2025	Succeeded by Lauren Boebert
U.S. order of precedence (ceremonial)
Preceded by Connie Conway as Former U.S. Representative	Order of precedence of the United States as Former U.S. Representative	Succeeded by John E. Cunningham as Former U.S. Representative
