= 2024 Colorado's 4th congressional district special election =

- June 25, 2024

Colorado's 4th congressional district
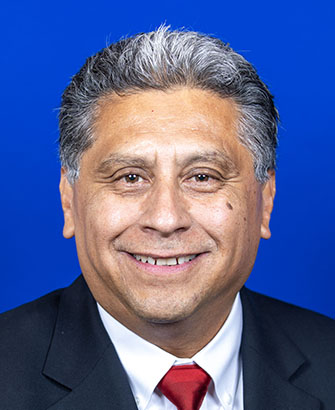

Nominee	Greg Lopez	Trisha Calvarese	Hannah Goodman
Party	Republican	Democratic	Libertarian
Popular vote	100,095	59,013	9,068
Percentage	58.40%	34.43%	5.29%
- County results Lopez: 40–50% 50–60% 60–70% 70–80% 80–90%
U.S. Representative before election
Ken Buck
Republican
Elected U.S. Representative
Greg Lopez
Republican

The 2024 Colorado's 4th congressional district special election was held on June 25, 2024, to fill the vacant seat in Colorado's 4th congressional district. The winner served in the United States House of Representatives for the remainder of the 118th United States Congress. The seat became vacant on March 22, 2024, when Ken Buck resigned from Congress.

The 4th district is based in eastern Colorado and the exurbs of Denver, taking in Highlands Ranch, Loveland, and Castle Rock. It is considered a safe Republican district and the most strongly Republican district in Colorado.

Nominees were not chosen via primary election. Instead, each party's nominee was selected by a committee of party leaders and elected officials in the 4th congressional district.

Republican nominee Greg Lopez easily defeated Democratic nominee Trisha Calvarese with 58.4% of the vote.

== Republican nomination ==
The Republican nominee was chosen on March 28, 2024, by a 111-member committee. Two candidates in the election, Holtorf and Lynch, served on the committee.

=== Candidates ===
==== Nominee ====
- Greg Lopez, former mayor of Parker and candidate for governor in 2018 and 2022

==== Eliminated at convention ====
- Ted Harvey, former state senator and candidate for the 6th district in 2008
- Richard Holtorf, state representative
- Mike Lynch, state representative and former Minority Leader of the Colorado House of Representatives
- Scott Melbye, nuclear energy executive
- Chris Phelen, Castle Rock Republican, Co-Founder of Venture Development Firm, Executive Director of Rugby Colorado, former U.S. Congressional Policy Advisor and Chief of Staff to Congressman Doug Lamborn (R-CO)
- Jerry Sonnenberg, Logan County commissioner and former president pro tempore of the Colorado Senate
- Floyd Trujillo, energy consultant and candidate for U.S. Senate in 2014
- Peter Yu, mortgage banker, nominee for the 2nd district in 2018, and candidate for U.S. Senate in 2022

==== Withdrawn ====
- Deborah Flora, radio host and candidate for U.S. Senate in 2022 (unsuccessfully ran in the regular primary)

==== Declined ====
- Lauren Boebert, U.S. Representative from the 3rd district (running in regular primary)

=== Endorsements ===
Greg Lopez

State legislators

- Richard Holtorf, state representative
Jerry Sonnenberg (eliminated)

State legislators

- Ted Harvey, former state senator and candidate for the 6th district in 2008
Declined to endorse

U.S. representatives

- Ken Buck, incumbent U.S. representative for this district

=== Convention results ===
Republican convention results
Candidate	First ballot		Second ballot		Third ballot		Fourth ballot		Fifth ballot		Sixth ballot	
Candidate	Votes	%	Votes	%	Votes	%	Votes	%	Votes	%	Votes	%
Greg Lopez	12	12.2%	17	17.3%	27	27.6%	34	34.7%	45	45.9%	51	52.6%
Jerry Sonnenberg	23	23.5%	24	24.5%	24	24.5%	24	24.5%	30	30.6%	46	47.4%
Ted Harvey	24	24.5%	27	27.6%	24	24.5%	26	26.5%	23	23.5%	Eliminated	
Richard Holtorf	12	12.2%	13	13.3%	16	16.3%	14	14.3%	Eliminated			
Mike Lynch	11	11.2%	10	10.2%	7	7.1%	Eliminated					
Scott Melbye	10	10.2%	4	4.1%	Eliminated							
Chris Phelen	6	6.1%	4	4.1%	Eliminated							
Floyd Trujillo	0	0.0%	0	0.0%	Eliminated							
Peter Yu	0	0.0%	0	0.0%	Eliminated							

== Democratic nomination ==
The Democratic nominee was chosen at a meeting on April 1, 2024.

=== Nominee ===
- Trisha Calvarese, communications professional

==== Eliminated at convention ====
- Karen Breslin, attorney, college professor, and candidate for U.S. Senate in 2022
- Ike McCorkle, U.S. Marine Corps veteran and nominee for this district in 2020 and 2022
- John Padora, engineer

=== Convention results ===
Democratic convention results
Candidate	First ballot	Second ballot		Third ballot
Candidate	%	%	%	%
Trisha Calvarese	31.8%	47.2%		64.5%
John Padora	29.0%	26.4%	56.6%	35.5%
Ike McCorkle	26.5%	26.4%	43.4%	Eliminated
Karen Breslin	12.8%	Eliminated		

== Minor party nominations ==
=== Candidates ===
- Frank Atwood (Approval Voting), chair of the Approval Voting Party and perennial candidate
- Hannah Goodman (Libertarian), chair of the Colorado Libertarian Party

== General election ==
=== Results ===
2024 Colorado's 4th congressional district vacancy election
Party	Candidate	Votes	%
Republican	Greg Lopez	100,095	58.40%
Democratic	Trisha Calvarese	59,013	34.43%
Libertarian	Hannah Goodman	9,069	5.29%
Approval Voting	Frank Atwood	3,225	1.88%
Total votes		171,402	100.00%
Republican hold			

By county

County	Greg Lopez Republican		Trisha Calvarese Democratic		Hannah Goodman Libertarian		Frank Atwood AVP		Margin		Total votes
County	#	%	#	%	#	%	#	%	#	%	Total votes
Adams	1,656	68.5	494	20.4	160	6.6	107	4.4	1,162	48.1	2,417
Arapahoe	2,881	50.7	2,413	42.5	292	5.1	96	1.7	468	8.2	5,682
Baca	754	81.1	116	12.5	45	4.8	15	1.6	638	68.6	930
Bent	777	70.4	231	20.9	63	5.7	33	3.0	546	49.5	1,104
Cheyenne	541	87.3	38	6.1	28	4.5	13	2.1	503	81.2	620
Crowley	662	74.6	161	18.2	43	4.8	21	2.4	501	56.4	887
Douglas	45,311	52.3	35,088	40.5	4,618	5.3	1,623	1.9	10,223	11.8	86,640
El Paso	1,731	79.7	297	13.7	115	5.3	29	1.3	1,434	66.0	2,172
Elbert	6,536	74.4	1,669	19.0	459	5.2	121	1.4	4,867	55.4	8,785
Kiowa	311	83.6	33	8.9	19	5.1	9	2.4	278	74.7	372
Kit Carson	1,537	82.6	222	11.9	76	4.1	26	1.4	1,315	70.7	1,861
Larimer	12,536	49.1	11,303	44.3	1,256	4.9	430	1.7	1,233	4.8	25,525
Lincoln	981	79.4	165	13.4	65	5.3	24	1.9	816	66.0	1,235
Logan	3,649	75.6	825	17.1	240	5.0	115	2.4	2,824	58.5	4,829
Morgan	3,903	73.3	1,027	19.3	287	5.4	107	2.0	2,876	54.0	5,324
Phillips	1,031	77.5	156	11.7	114	8.6	30	2.3	875	65.8	1,331
Prowers	1,924	76.4	421	16.7	125	5.0	47	1.9	1,503	59.7	2,517
Sedgwick	546	74.4	125	17.0	38	5.2	25	3.4	421	57.4	734
Washington	1,398	85.5	121	7.4	79	4.8	37	2.3	1,277	78.1	1,635
Weld	9,656	66.1	3,862	26.4	820	5.6	278	1.9	5,794	39.7	14,616
Yuma	1,774	81.2	246	11.3	127	5.8	39	1.8	1,528	69.9	2,186
Total	100,095	58.4	59,013	34.4	9,069	5.3	3,225	1.9	41,082	24.0	171,402
