= 2024 Colorado Proposition 129 =

Proposition 129
- November 5, 2024
- Establishing Veterinary Professional Associates

Results
| Choice | Votes | % |
|---|---|---|
| Yes | 1,572,545 | 52.76% |
| No | 1,407,814 | 47.24% |
| Total votes | 2,980,359 | 100.00% |
County results
For
60–70%
50–60%
Against
60–70%
50–60%

2024 Colorado Proposition 129 was a successful ballot measure that appeared before voters in Colorado during the 2024 general election. The proposition will create a new state license for the position of veterinary professional associate. This will be a new veterinary position in between veterinarians and veterinary technician specialist.

== Background ==
Prior to the passage of Proposition 129, Colorado had three main veterinary positions: veterinarians, veterinary technicians, and veterinary technician specialists. All of these positions are regulated by the Colorado Board of Veterinary Medicine. Veterinary technicians must have an associate's degree and can assist veterinarians and provide treatment for minor conditions. Veterinary technician specialists must have an associate's degree in addition to at least three years of clinical training and can perform all of the responsibilities of a veterinary technician in addition to performing emergency medical and surgical assistance. Finally, veterinarians must have a doctoral degree and can perform all levels of veterinary care. The new position of veterinary professional associate created by Proposition 129 requires a master's degree and is able to perform many tasks technicians specialists are not allowed to, such as routine surgeries.

Proposition 129 was referred to the ballot via citizen petition. The group All Pets Deserve Care circulated petitions, funded mostly by the Dumb Friends League. The petition began in response to a veterinarian shortage within Colorado. The new position of veterinary professional associate requires a master's degree in veterinary clinical care. This degree was not offered by any universities in Colorado at the time of the measure's passage, though Colorado State University does have plans for its implementation.

== Contents ==
The proposition appeared on the ballot as follows:

Shall there be a change to the Colorado Revised Statutes creating a new veterinary professional associate profession, and, in connection therewith, establishing qualifications including a master's degree in veterinary clinical care or the equivalent as determined by the state board of veterinary medicine to be a veterinary professional associate; requiring registration with the state board; allowing a registered veterinary professional associate to practice veterinary medicine under the supervision of a licensed veterinarian; and making it a misdemeanor to practice as a veterinary professional associate without an active registration?

== Campaigns ==
=== Support ===
Support of Proposition 129 was led by the organization All Pets Deserve Vet Care. Colorado's official voter guide offered the arguments in favor of the ballot measure that creating the new veterinary professional associate position would create new career opportunities for those in the veterinary field and provide greater access to veterinary care, particularly in rural and agricultural communities.

'Yes'

State officials

- Jared Polis, Governor of Colorado (2019-present)
- Heidi Ganahl, Former Regent of the University of Colorado (2017-2023)
- Marlon Reis, First Gentleman of Colorado (2019-present)

State senators

- Steve Fenberg, President of the Colorado State Senate (2022-present) from the 18th district (2017-2025)
- Sonya Jaquez Lewis, state senator from the 17th district (2021-2025)

State representatives

- Ryan Armagost, state representative from the 64th district (2023-2025)

Newspapers

- The Denver Post
- The Durango Herald

Organizations

- American Society for the Prevention of Cruelty to Animals
- Colorado Republican Party
- Dumb Friends League
- The Humane Society Of The United States
- Interfaith Alliance of Colorado

=== Opposition ===
Opposition to Proposition 129 was led by the organization Keep Our Pets Safe. The state's official voter guide offered the arguments against the measure that the requirements laid out by Proposition 129 are vauge and unclear, there are currently no academic programs offered for veterinary professional associates in Colorado universities, and it would increase risk for animals.

'No'

State representatives

- Karen McCormick, state representative from the 11th district (2021-present)
- Brianna Titone, state representative from the 27th district (2019-present)

Newspapers

- The Colorado Springs Gazette

Organizations

- American Association of Bovine Practitioners
- American Humane
- American Veterinary Medical Association

== Results ==
Proposition 129 required a simple majority to pass. It did so with roughly 53% voting in favor of the measure.

Proposition 129
| Choice | Votes | % |
|---|---|---|
| For | 1,572,545 | 52.76 |
| Against | 1,407,814 | 47.24 |
| Total | 2,980,359 | 100.00 |

=== Results by county ===
| County | For | | Against | | Margin | | Total votes cast |
| County | # | % | # | % | # | % | Total votes cast |
|---|---|---|---|---|---|---|---|
| Adams | 111,840 | 52.12% | 102,733 | 47.88% | 9,107 | 4.24% | 214,573 |
| Alamosa | 3,667 | 51.73% | 3,422 | 48.27% | 245 | 3.46% | 7,089 |
| Arapahoe | 163,997 | 54.29% | 138,069 | 45.71% | 25,928 | 8.58% | 302,066 |
| Archuleta | 4,416 | 51.09% | 4,227 | 48.91% | 189 | 2.19% | 8,643 |
| Baca | 573 | 30.25% | 1,321 | 69.75% | -748 | -39.49% | 1,894 |
| Bent | 1,026 | 49.11% | 1,063 | 50.89% | -37 | -1.77% | 2,089 |
| Boulder | 86,532 | 47.99% | 93,795 | 52.01% | -7,263 | -4.03% | 180,327 |
| Broomfield | 23,250 | 53.45% | 20,251 | 46.55% | 2,999 | 6.89% | 43,501 |
| Chaffee | 7,162 | 52.91% | 6,375 | 47.09% | 787 | 5.81% | 13,537 |
| Cheyenne | 369 | 36.53% | 641 | 63.47% | -272 | -26.93% | 1,010 |
| Clear Creek | 2,909 | 51.31% | 2,760 | 48.69% | 149 | 2.63% | 5,669 |
| Conejos | 1,764 | 45.44% | 2,118 | 54.56% | -354 | -9.12% | 3,882 |
| Costilla | 1,114 | 58.69% | 784 | 41.31% | 330 | 17.39% | 1,898 |
| Crowley | 844 | 51.15% | 806 | 48.85% | 38 | 2.30% | 1,650 |
| Custer | 1,993 | 54.13% | 1,689 | 45.87% | 304 | 8.26% | 3,682 |
| Delta | 9,747 | 52.42% | 8,848 | 47.58% | 899 | 4.83% | 18,595 |
| Denver | 190,936 | 57.02% | 143,909 | 42.98% | 47,027 | 14.04% | 334,845 |
| Dolores | 678 | 51.72% | 633 | 48.28% | 45 | 3.43% | 1,311 |
| Douglas | 125,972 | 55.05% | 102,880 | 44.95% | 23,092 | 10.09% | 228,852 |
| Eagle | 14,105 | 55.29% | 11,408 | 44.71% | 2,697 | 10.57% | 25,513 |
| El Paso | 196,508 | 54.55% | 163,728 | 45.45% | 32,780 | 9.10% | 360,236 |
| Elbert | 8,635 | 43.95% | 11,013 | 56.05% | -2,378 | -12.10% | 19,648 |
| Fremont | 12,972 | 53.60% | 11,229 | 46.40% | 1,743 | 7.20% | 24,201 |
| Garfield | 14,600 | 51.30% | 13,858 | 48.70% | 742 | 2.61% | 28,458 |
| Gilpin | 1,887 | 48.38% | 2,013 | 51.62% | -126 | -3.23% | 3,900 |
| Grand | 4,386 | 47.03% | 4,939 | 52.97% | -553 | -5.93% | 9,325 |
| Gunnison | 4,899 | 48.51% | 5,200 | 51.49% | -301 | -2.98% | 10,099 |
| Hinsdale | 309 | 54.88% | 254 | 45.12% | 55 | 9.77% | 563 |
| Huerfano | 2,505 | 59.69% | 1,692 | 40.31% | 813 | 19.37% | 4,197 |
| Jackson | 305 | 38.90% | 479 | 61.10% | -174 | -22.19% | 784 |
| Jefferson | 178,209 | 52.44% | 161,598 | 47.56% | 16,611 | 4.89% | 339,807 |
| Kiowa | 296 | 36.77% | 509 | 63.23% | -213 | -26.46% | 805 |
| Kit Carson | 1,219 | 34.67% | 2,297 | 65.33% | -1,078 | -30.66% | 3,516 |
| La Plata | 15,993 | 48.74% | 16,817 | 51.26% | -824 | -2.51% | 32,810 |
| Lake | 1,920 | 53.10% | 1,696 | 46.90% | 224 | 6.19% | 3,616 |
| Larimer | 108,021 | 51.29% | 102,593 | 48.71% | 5,428 | 2.58% | 210,614 |
| Las Animas | 3,869 | 52.64% | 3,481 | 47.36% | 388 | 5.28% | 7,350 |
| Lincoln | 989 | 39.90% | 1,490 | 60.10% | -501 | -20.21% | 2,479 |
| Logan | 4,493 | 46.55% | 5,159 | 53.45% | -666 | -6.90% | 9,652 |
| Mesa | 40,973 | 47.49% | 45,306 | 52.51% | -4,333 | -5.02% | 86,279 |
| Mineral | 305 | 43.26% | 400 | 56.74% | -95 | -13.48% | 705 |
| Moffat | 2,586 | 41.47% | 3,650 | 58.53% | -1,064 | -17.06% | 6,236 |
| Montezuma | 7,677 | 53.96% | 6,549 | 46.04% | 1,128 | 7.93% | 14,226 |
| Montrose | 11,455 | 47.62% | 12,601 | 52.38% | -1,146 | -4.76% | 24,056 |
| Morgan | 5,720 | 44.54% | 7,123 | 55.46% | -1,403 | -10.92% | 12,843 |
| Otero | 4,467 | 52.11% | 4,106 | 47.89% | 361 | 4.21% | 8,573 |
| Ouray | 2,153 | 56.17% | 1,680 | 43.83% | 473 | 12.34% | 3,833 |
| Park | 5,510 | 47.80% | 6,017 | 52.20% | -507 | -4.40% | 11,527 |
| Phillips | 797 | 36.95% | 1,360 | 63.05% | -563 | -26.10% | 2,157 |
| Pitkin | 6,846 | 68.56% | 3,139 | 31.44% | 3,707 | 37.13% | 9,985 |
| Prowers | 2,159 | 44.32% | 2,712 | 55.68% | -553 | -11.35% | 4,871 |
| Pueblo | 49,163 | 60.63% | 31,927 | 39.37% | 17,236 | 21.26% | 81,090 |
| Rio Blanco | 1,348 | 38.51% | 2,152 | 61.49% | -804 | -22.97% | 3,500 |
| Rio Grande | 2,603 | 43.81% | 3,338 | 56.19% | -735 | -12.37% | 5,941 |
| Routt | 7,645 | 49.56% | 7,780 | 50.44% | -135 | -0.88% | 15,425 |
| Saguache | 1,619 | 52.06% | 1,491 | 47.94% | 128 | 4.12% | 3,110 |
| San Juan | 282 | 53.31% | 247 | 46.69% | 35 | 6.62% | 529 |
| San Miguel | 2,649 | 62.02% | 1,622 | 37.98% | 1,027 | 24.05% | 4,271 |
| Sedgwick | 619 | 49.68% | 627 | 50.32% | -8 | -0.64% | 1,246 |
| Summit | 8,657 | 53.85% | 7,419 | 46.15% | 1,238 | 7.70% | 16,076 |
| Teller | 7,885 | 50.64% | 7,685 | 49.36% | 200 | 1.28% | 15,570 |
| Washington | 1,057 | 39.19% | 1,640 | 60.81% | -583 | -21.62% | 2,697 |
| Weld | 81,929 | 48.63% | 86,531 | 51.37% | -4,602 | -2.73% | 168,460 |
| Yuma | 1,532 | 34.30% | 2,935 | 65.70% | -1,403 | -31.41% | 4,467 |
| Total | 1,572,545 | 52.76% | 1,407,814 | 47.24% | 164,731 | 5.53% | 2,980,359 |

== See also ==
- 2024 United States ballot measures
