= John Block (New Mexico politician) =

American politician (born 1997)

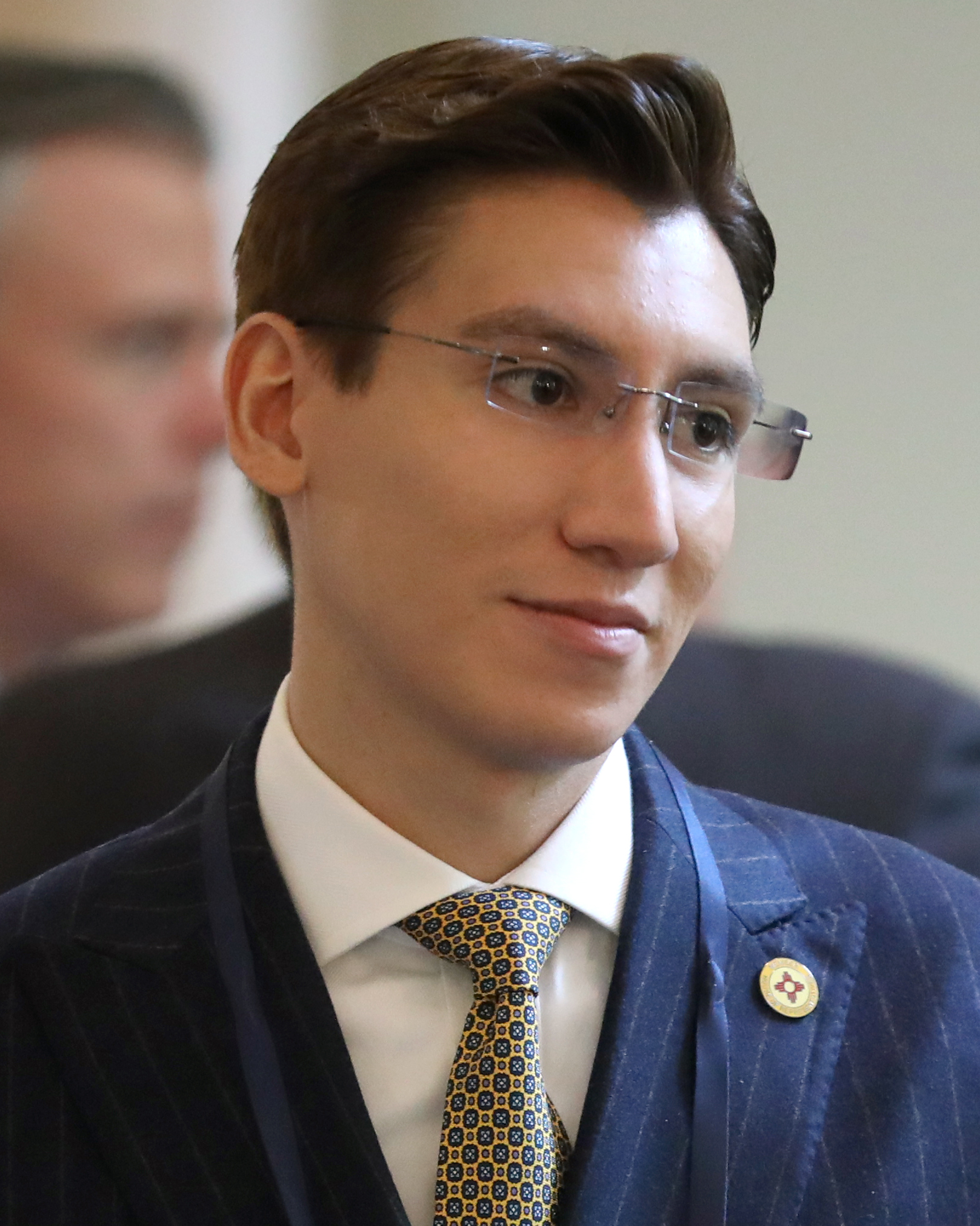

Member of the New Mexico House of Representatives from the 51st district
- Incumbent
- Assumed office January 1, 2023
- Preceded by: Rachel Black

Personal details
- Born: January 17, 1997 (age 29) New Mexico, U.S.
- Party: Republican
- Education: Santa Fe Community College (AAS); Rutgers University, Camden (BA); Eastern New Mexico University (MBA)

John Block (born January 17, 1997) is an American politician serving as a member of the New Mexico House of Representatives for the 51st district. Elected in November 2022, he assumed office on January 1, 2023. Block is the founder and editor of The Piñon Post, a conservative news and political commentary online newspaper and media outlet based in New Mexico.

== Early life and education ==
Block was born and raised in New Mexico. He earned an associate of applied science in film production and documentary media from Santa Fe Community College in 2016, a Bachelor of Arts degree in business administration from Rutgers University Camden in 2019, and a Master of Business Administration from Eastern New Mexico University in 2020.

== Career ==
In 2016, Block served as a staffer for members of the New Mexico House of Representatives. From 2017 to 2018, he worked as an international government affairs assistant at Chevron.

From 2018 to 2019, he worked as the manager of digital communications at Americans United for Life, a law firm and anti-abortion advocacy organization. From 2019 to 2020, Block worked as a client manager and PAC manager for the Committee to Defend the President, a super PAC established to support the Donald Trump 2020 presidential campaign. From 2020 to 2022, he worked as a brand manager for Pop Acta, a targeted media company. He was elected to the New Mexico House of Representatives in November 2022.

He is currently the youngest legislator in New Mexico, and the first member of Generation Z elected to the New Mexico House of Representatives.

In November 2024, New Mexico Secretary of State Maggie Toulouse Oliver accused Block of encouraging online harassment she had received. Block said he too had been harassed, and said, "If it gets to violent threats like you described that you got, I apologize that that is happening to you." Later, Alex Curtas, the spokesperson for Toulouse Oliver wrote in an email to the Source New Mexico news outlet that they had not filed a report on this matter and were unlikely to do so, as they could not compile evidence of the allegations.

== Electoral history ==
=== 2022 Republican primary ===
Republican primary for New Mexico House of Representatives District 51, 2022
Party	Candidate	Votes	%
Republican	John Block	1,540	50.8
Republican	Rachel Black	1,494	49.2

=== 2022 General election ===
General election for New Mexico House of Representatives District 51, 2022
Party	Candidate	Votes	%
Republican	John Block	5,824	63.2
Democratic	Sharonlee Cummins	3,395	36.8

=== 2024 Republican primary ===
Republican primary for New Mexico House of Representatives District 51, 2024
Party	Candidate	Votes	%
Republican	John Block	1,999	100

=== 2024 General election ===
General election for New Mexico House of Representatives District 51, 2024
Party	Candidate	Votes	%
Republican	John Block	7,424	61.5
Democratic	Ashlie Myers	4,653	38.5

== Political positions ==
=== Energy ===
Block is in favor of expanding oil, gas, and coal production by striking legislation such as 2019’s Energy Transition Act. In 2025, he introduced House Bill 45, a 3.75% excise tax on renewable energy, which the Southwest Public Policy Institute (SPPI) opposed, calling it "anti-free market and harmful to consumers."

=== Abortion and assisted suicide ===
Block has said, "I believe in the right to life from conception to natural death." His position has been reported as opposing abortion.

=== Second Amendment ===
Block supports Constitutional Carry (Permitless Carry) legislation and opposes legislation that “would restrict New Mexicans’ rights to own and carry a firearm.”

=== Education ===
Block believes in dismantling the New Mexico Public Education Department and instead empowering decision-making in the individual school districts.

=== Taxation ===
In 2025, Representative John Block introduced House Bill 45, proposing a 3.75% excise tax on renewable energy production to fund the Severance Tax Permanent Fund.

== Personal life ==
Block is openly gay, Christian, and is of Hispanic and Native American descent.

Block attended the January 6 United States Capitol attack in 2021. However, he maintains that he did not enter any restricted areas. When reached for comment, the FBI informed media outlets that they could neither confirm nor deny that Block was being investigated.
