= Demery (surname) =

Demery as a surname originates from the Duchy of Normandy, in France, where the Demery family was established.

Spelling variations of this family name include: Demers, Demere, Demerre, Demery, Dimery, Dimry, Demerey, Demerais, Demeret, Demerez, Lemers, Lemere, Lemerre, Lemery, Lemerey, Lemerais, Lemeret, Lemerez, Desmery, Démery, Lesmery, Lémery, Lamer, Lamers, Lamere, Lamerre, Lamery, Lamerais, Lameret, Merre, Mérais, Méret, Mérey, Méry, Merrée, Mériaux, Mériau, Mériel, Mériet, Méric, Mérigon, Mérigot, Mériguet, Mérigeau and many more.

== List of persons with the surname ==
- Ben Demery (b. 1986), Australian Paralympic tandem cyclist
- Larry Demery (b. 1953), American baseball player
- Jericho Brown born Nelson Demery III (b. 1976), American poet and writer
- Rodney Demery, American author, TV host, and former police detective
- Thomas Demery (b. 1949), American, former Assistant Secretary of the U.S. Department of Housing and Urban Development
- Nichola Lashawn Demery (Dimry) (b. 1973), Senior Legal Analyst, California Department of Justice
