= New Mexico State University Alamogordo =

Public community college in Alamogordo, New Mexico, US

Coordinates: 32.9191°N 105.9257°W

- Motto: Be Bold. Shape the Future.
- Type: Public community college
- Established: 1958
- President: Mark Cal
- Location: Alamogordo, New Mexico, U.S.
- Colors: Crimson and White
- Nickname: Aggies
- Mascot: Pistol Pete
- Website: alamogordo.nmsu.edu

New Mexico State University Alamogordo (NMSU-A) is a public community college in Alamogordo, New Mexico. It is a branch campus of New Mexico State University at Las Cruces and is accredited by Higher Learning Commission.

The Tays Center, a 1,400-seat indoor arena, is home to the New Mexico State University - Alamogordo basketball team. It is also used for concerts, conventions, trade shows, graduation ceremonies, and other special events.

== History ==
New Mexico State University at Alamogordo (NMSU-A) is situated in the foothills, at the base of the Sacramento Mountains. This vantage point overlooks the city of Alamogordo and the Tularosa Basin. The service area of the school includes Holloman Air Force Base (HAFB), White Sands Missile Range, and stretches beyond the view to include the Mescalero Apache Reservation and approximately twenty villages and towns.

== Academics ==
The community college offers certificate and associate degrees. The college has a transfer articulation agreement with New Mexico State University in Las Cruces for NMSU-A students who plan to pursue bachelor's degrees.

== Notable alumni ==
- Rachel A. Black, member of the New Mexico House of Representatives
- Rodney Demery, law enforcement officer, television host, and author
- Greg Lopez, U.S. Representative from Colorado

== Gallery ==
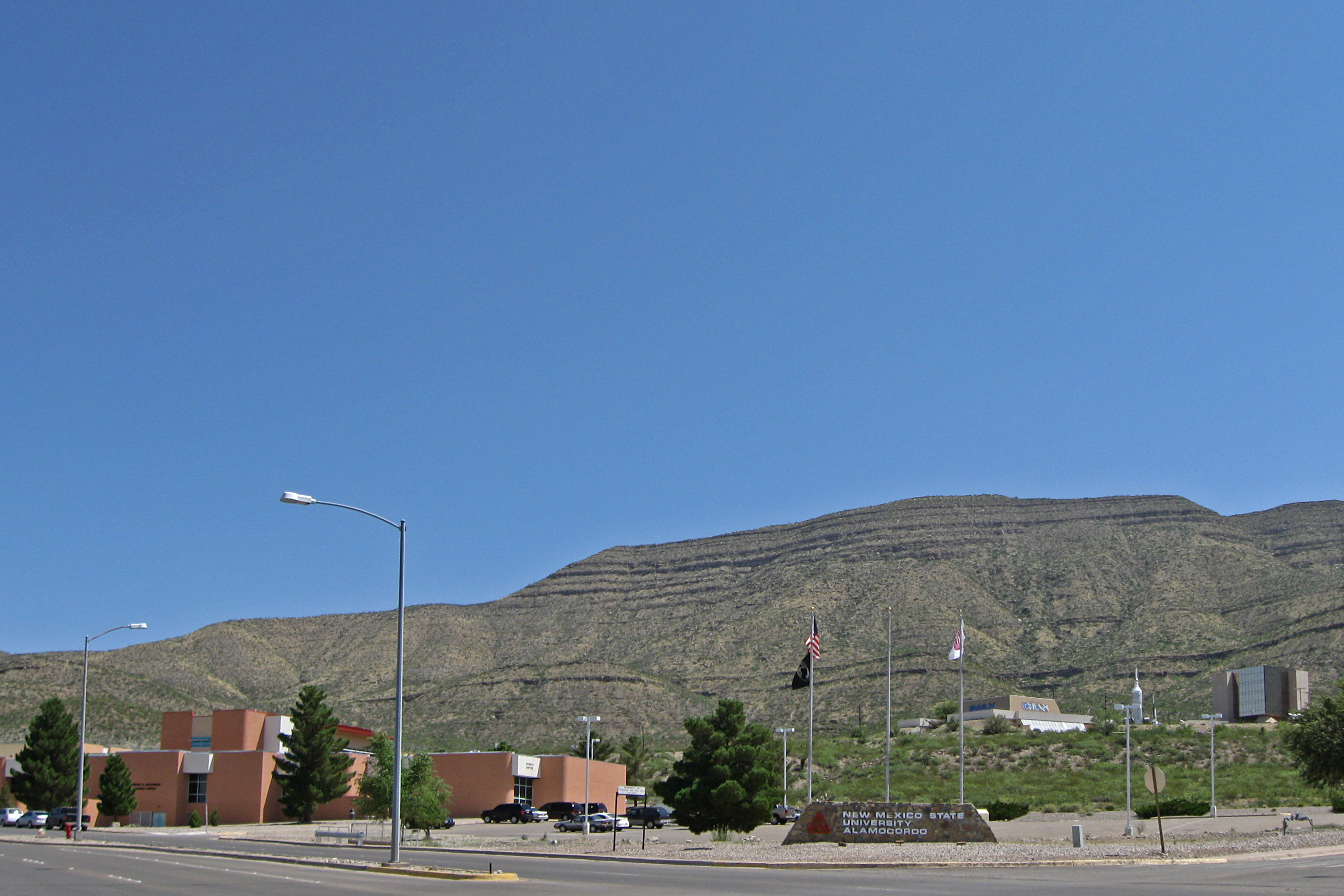
NMSU-A Entrance

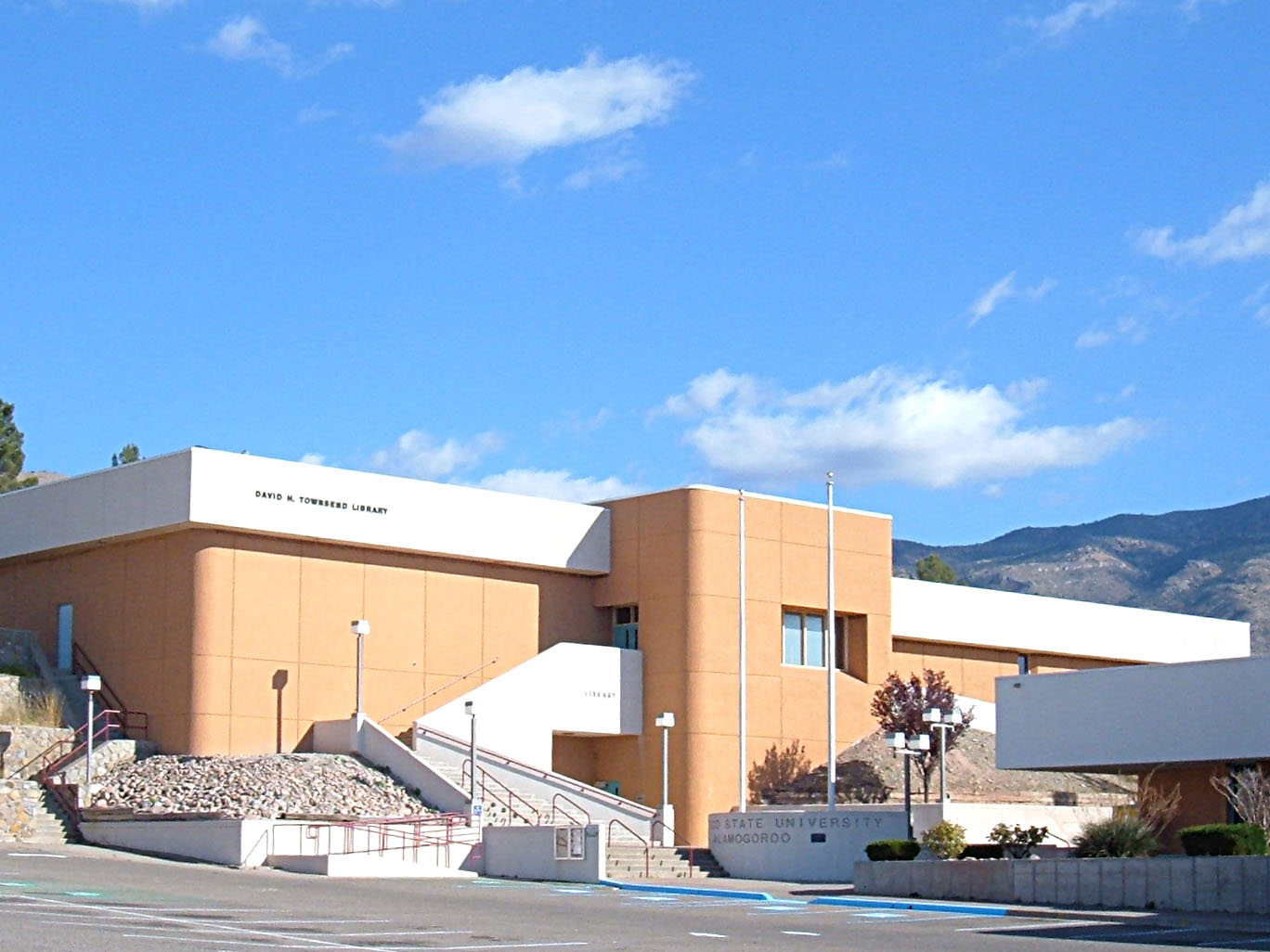
New Mexico State University Alamogordo Townsend Library
