= Tim Dore =

American politician

Member of the Colorado House of Representatives from the 64th district
- In office January 2013 – January 11, 2017
- Preceded by: Wesley McKinley
- Succeeded by: Kimmi Lewis

Personal details
- Born: Timothy Robert Dore; April 28, 1973 (age 53) Denver, Colorado, U.S.
- Party: Republican
- Spouse: Kelly
- Education: Menlo College; Sturm College of Law (JD)

Timothy Robert Dore (born April 28, 1973) is an American lawyer, politician, and a member of the Republican Party who served two terms in the Colorado House of Representatives from Colorado's 64th house District.

== Early life and education ==
He was born in Denver, attended Denver Public Schools until High School when he attended Bishop Machebeuf Catholic High School graduating in 1991. He later graduated from Menlo College in California in 1995 with degrees in Social Political Philosophy and History. He graduated from the University of Denver Sturm College of Law with a Juris Doctor in 2000.

== Legal career & politics ==
Immediately following law school, he worked for several years as a legal and political consultant for numerous political campaigns and related groups around the United States. During this time, he also served a year as a law clerk in Colorado at a Federal District Court.

In 2003, he became the executive director for the Colorado Catholic Conference leading the Church’s public policy in Colorado and regionally. He also served on the Communications and Advisory Committee for the United States Conference of Catholic Bishops.

In 2008, he became the Senior Vice President of Government Relations for the Mountain West Credit Union Association, heading local, state and federal legislative and political efforts for Arizona, Colorado and Wyoming.

Since 2010 he has practiced law in the Denver Area of Colorado.

In the 2012 election, he defeated the only other candidate, the Libertarian Party candidate Nick Schneider, by 24,405 votes to 7,770. He also won the general election in 2014. However, in the 2016 election, he was defeated in the primary by fellow Republican candidate Kimmi Lewis, who went on to win the general election.

He served in the Colorado House of Representatives representing the 64th District from 2013 to 2017.

== Later career ==
Since 2011 he has served as General Counsel of the Mountain West Credit Union Association.

Since February 2019 he has served as General Counsel of Amari.ai Inc.

== Personal life ==
Tim and his wife Kelly have four children and they reside in Elizabeth, Colorado.
