= Rachel Black =

American politician

Member of the New Mexico House of Representatives from the 51st district
- In office January 15, 2019 – January 1, 2023
- Preceded by: Yvette Herrell
- Succeeded by: John Block

Personal details
- Born: Rachel Black
- Party: Republican
- Education: New Mexico State University Alamogordo

Rachel A. Black is an American politician who served as a member of the New Mexico House of Representatives for the 51st district from 2019 to 2023.

== Early life and education ==
Black moved to Alamogordo, New Mexico at the age of five. She graduated from Alamogordo High School and attended New Mexico State University Alamogordo.

== Career ==
Black began her career working for the First National Bank. She became interested in politics while working for the Otero County treasurer, and ran for New Mexico House of Representatives on a platform of fiscal responsibility. A member of the Republican Party, Black was elected to the New Mexico House of Representatives in the 2018 election, succeeding incumbent Yvette Herrell, who retired from office to run for New Mexico's 2nd congressional district in the 2018 election.

After Joe Biden defeated Donald Trump in the 2020 presidential election, Black made baseless claims of voting irregularities. Black also falsely stated that Biden lost the election.
