= Kimmi Lewis =

American politician (1957–2019)

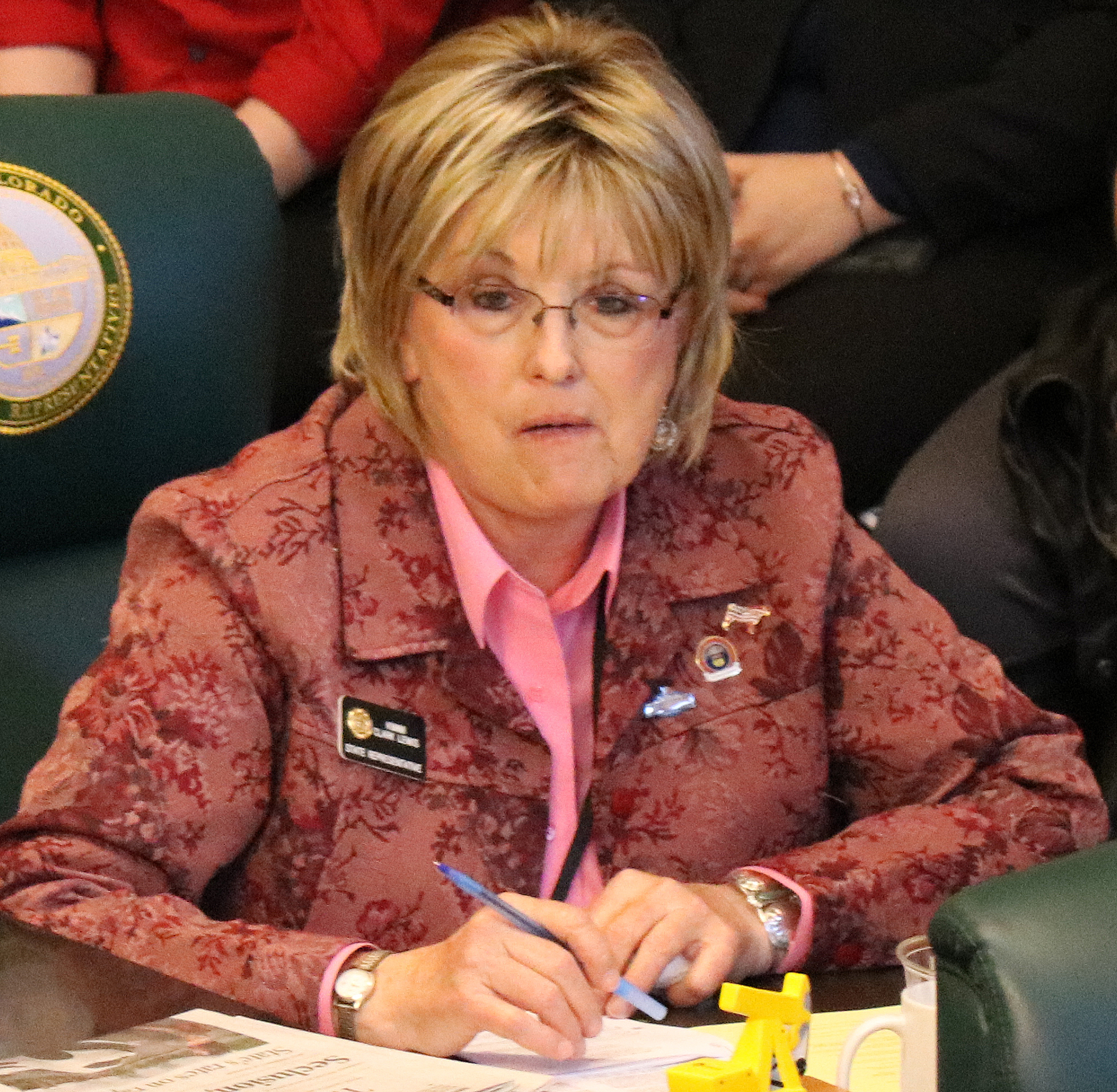
- Lewis in 2018

Member of the Colorado House of Representatives from the 64th district
- In office January 11, 2017 – December 6, 2019
- Preceded by: Tim Dore
- Succeeded by: Richard Holtorf

Personal details
- Born: Kimmi Joan Clark; February 19, 1957 La Junta, Colorado, U.S.
- Died: December 6, 2019 (aged 62) Kim, Colorado, U.S.
- Party: Republican
- Profession: Cattle producer
- Website: www.kimmilewis.us

Kimmi Clark Lewis (March 19, 1957 – December 6, 2019) was an American politician who served as a state representative from Kim, Colorado. A Republican, Lewis represented Colorado House of Representatives District 64, a massive district which encompasses nine counties on Colorado's Eastern Plains, including Baca, Bent, Crowley, Elbert, Kiowa, Las Animas, Lincoln, Prowers, and Washington. She was first elected in 2016. She defeated Republican incumbent Timothy Dore in the primary and went on to win the general election.

== Cattle producer ==
Lewis was a rancher. She owned and ran the Muddy Valley Ranch near Kim, Colorado, in eastern Las Animas County. Her husband died in 2000, leaving her to operate the ranch and finish raising their six children, all of whom have since earned college degrees.

She attended Trinidad State Junior College.

== Death ==
Lewis died of cancer on December 6, 2019, at the age of 62.
