= 2022 Colorado gubernatorial election =

- November 8, 2022
- Turnout: 66.28% ▼
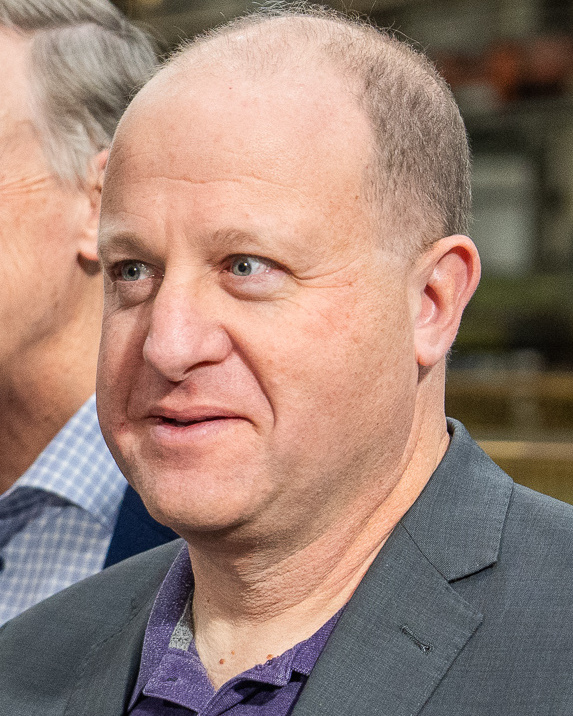

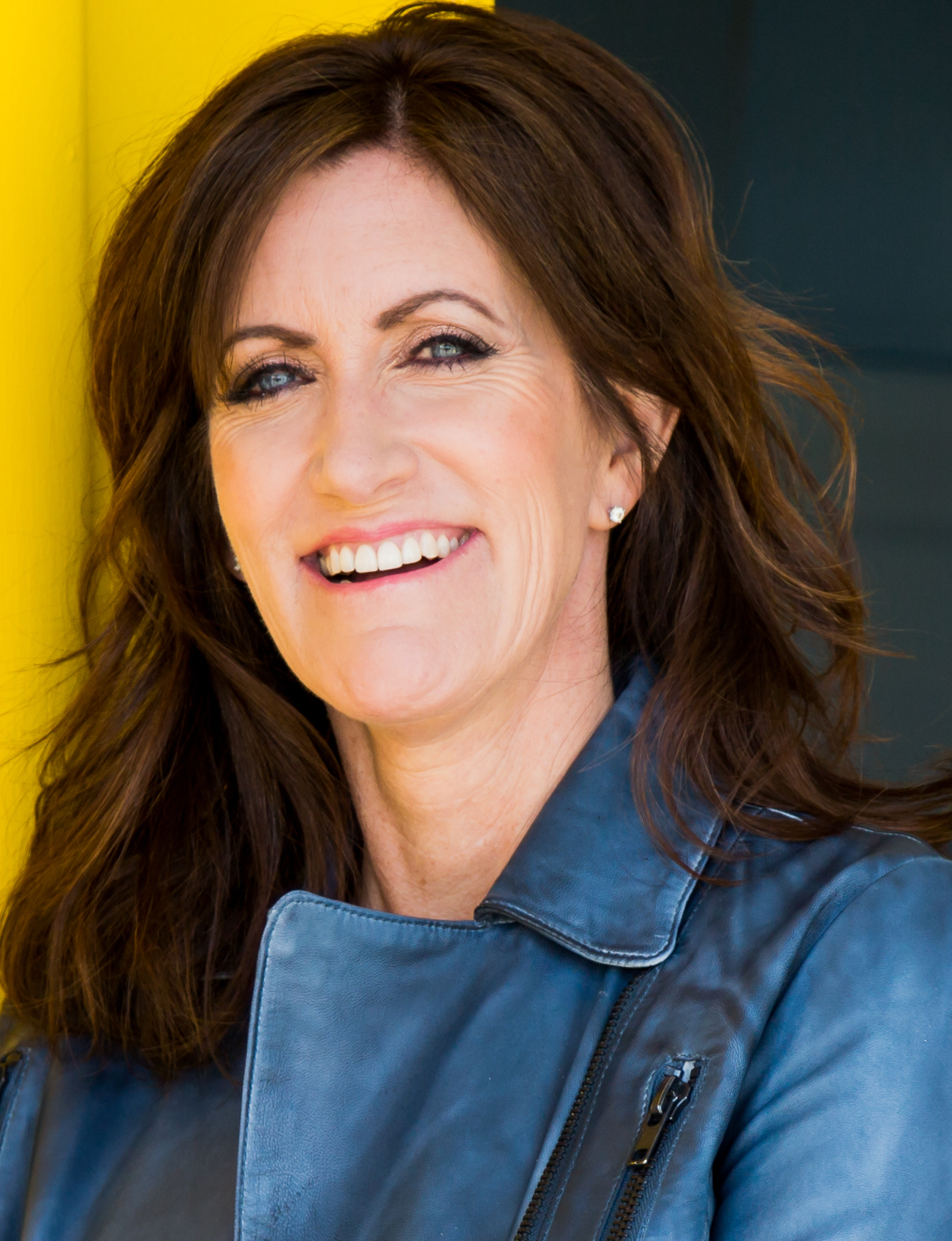
Nominee	Jared Polis	Heidi Ganahl
Party	Democratic	Republican
Running mate	Dianne Primavera	Danny Moore
Popular vote	1,468,481	983,040
Percentage	58.53%	39.18%
- Polis: 40–50% 50–60% 60–70% 70–80% 80–90% >90% Ganahl: 40–50% 50–60% 60–70% 70–80% 80–90% >90% Tie: 40–50% 50% No votes
Governor before election
Jared Polis
Democratic
Elected Governor
Jared Polis
Democratic

The 2022 Colorado gubernatorial election was held on November 8, 2022. Incumbent Democratic Governor Jared Polis won election to a second term, defeating Republican University of Colorado regent Heidi Ganahl by a decisive margin. Ganahl conceded on election night. The primary election was held on June 28. Polis won two counties he lost in 2018: Grand and Las Animas.

Polis's 2022 victory marked the first time in American history that an openly gay politician was re-elected governor of a state. Having won more than 58% of the vote, Polis had the best performance for a re-elected Colorado governor since Bill Owens in 2002, the best for a Democrat since Roy Romer in 1990, and the second-highest raw vote total ever in a Colorado gubernatorial race, behind his successor, Phil Weiser.

== Democratic assembly ==
=== Candidates ===
==== Nominated at assembly ====
- Jared Polis, incumbent governor
  - Running mate: Dianne Primavera, incumbent lieutenant governor

==== Eliminated at assembly ====
- None

=== Results ===
Democratic primary results
Party	Candidate	Votes	%
Democratic	Jared Polis (incumbent)	523,489	100.00%
Total votes		523,489	100.00%

== Republican primary ==
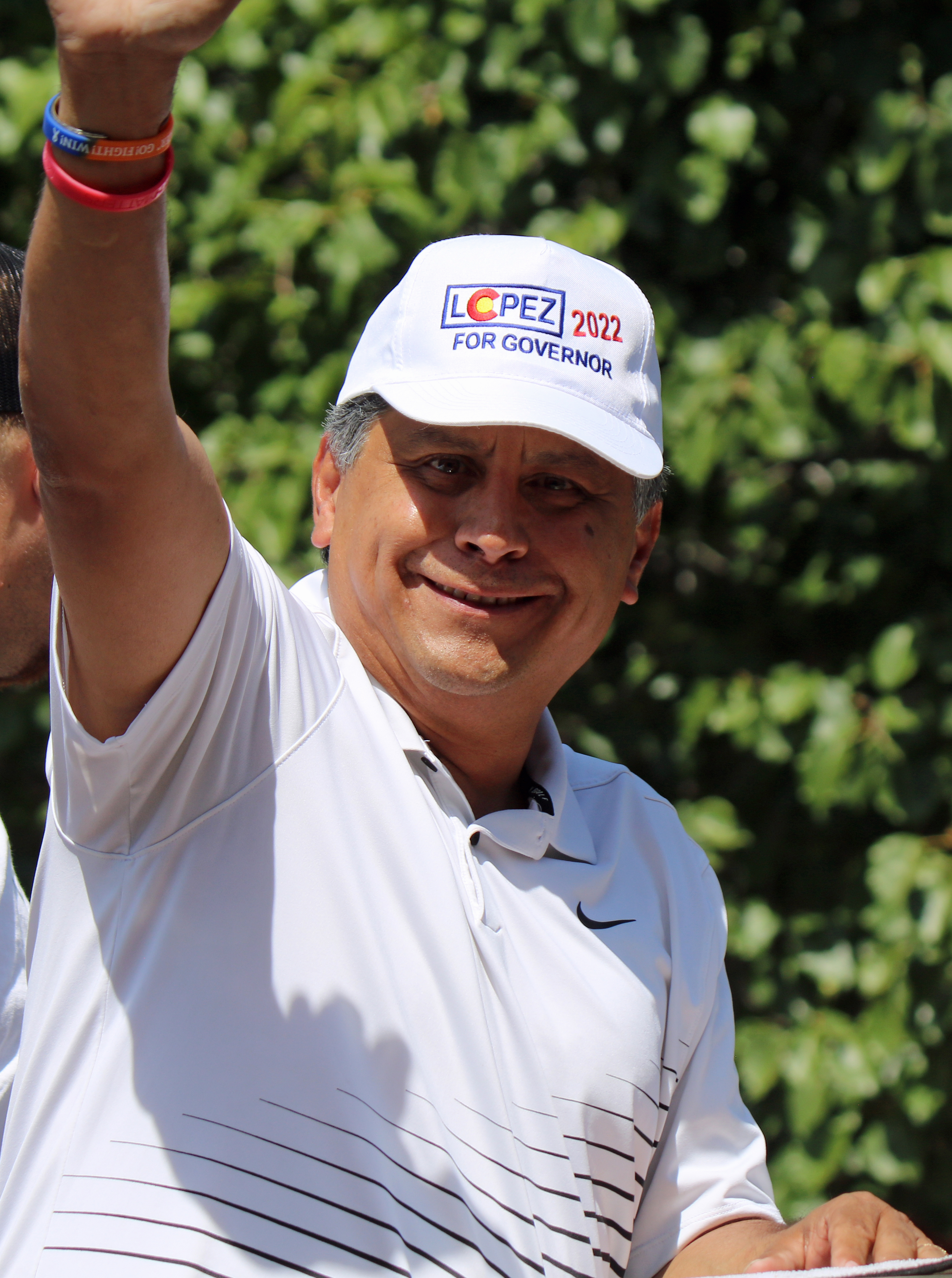
Former Colorado SBA director Greg Lopez finished second in the primary.

=== Candidates ===
==== Nominee ====
- Heidi Ganahl, member of the Regents of the University of Colorado
  - Running mate: Danny Moore, businessman

==== Eliminated in primary ====
- Greg Lopez, former mayor of Parker and former director of the Small Business Administration for Colorado; candidate for governor in 2018 and for U.S. Senate in 2016

==== Eliminated at convention ====
- Laurie Clark
- Darryl Gibbs, truck driver and U.S. Air Force veteran
- Jon Gray-Ginsberg
- Danielle Neuschwanger, realtor
- Jim Rundberg, U.S. Army veteran, independent candidate for governor in 2014, and Republican candidate for President of the United States in 2016

==== Declined ====
- Guy Benson, political pundit, Fox News contributor, and political editor for Townhall
- Ken Buck, U.S. representative from Colorado's 4th congressional district, former chair of the Colorado Republican Party, and nominee for U.S. Senate in 2010
- Bill Owens, former governor of Colorado (endorsed Ganahl)

=== Endorsements ===
Heidi Ganahl

Statewide officials

- Bill Owens, former governor of Colorado (1999–2007)

Newspapers

- Colorado Springs Gazette (Republican primary only)

=== Results ===
Results by county: Ganahl: Ganahl—50–60%; Ganahl—60–70%; Lopez: Lopez—50–60%; Lopez—60–70%

Republican primary results
Party	Candidate	Votes	%
Republican	Heidi Ganahl	341,157	53.87%
Republican	Greg Lopez	292,187	46.13%
Total votes		633,344	100.0%

== American Constitution convention ==
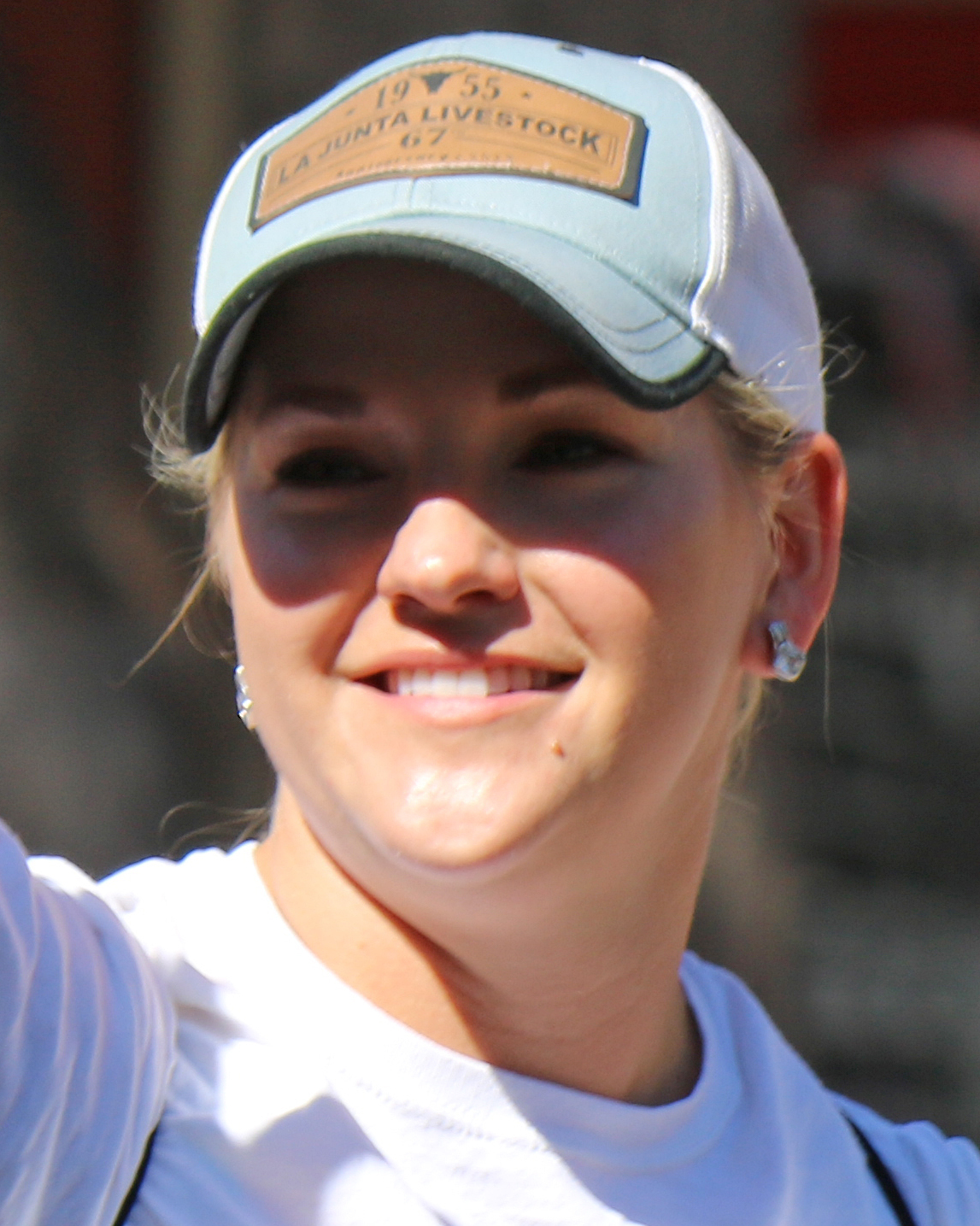
Danielle Neuschwanger, the Constitution nominee

=== Candidates ===
==== Nominee ====
- Danielle Neuschwanger, realtor (previously ran for Republican nomination)
  - Running mate: Darryl Gibbs, truck driver and U.S. Air Force veteran (previously ran for Republican nomination)

== General election ==
=== Predictions ===
Source	Ranking	As of
The Cook Political Report	Solid D	July 29, 2022
Inside Elections	Solid D	July 22, 2022
Sabato's Crystal Ball	Safe D	October 12, 2022
Politico	Likely D	April 1, 2022
RCP	Likely D	October 20, 2022
Fox News	Likely D	May 12, 2022
538	Solid D	July 31, 2022
Elections Daily	Safe D	November 7, 2022

=== Endorsements ===
Jared Polis (D)

Labor unions

- National Education Association
- United Mine Workers

Organizations

- Cobalt Advocates
- Colorado AFL–CIO
- Colorado Black Women for Political Action
- Colorado Organization for Latina Opportunity and Reproductive Rights
- Democratic Governors Association
- Everytown for Gun Safety
- Human Rights Campaign
- Humane Society of the United States Legislative Fund
- One Colorado
- Planned Parenthood Action Fund
- Save the Children USA
- Stand for Children

Newspapers

- The Denver Post
- Sentinel Colorado
Heidi Ganahl (R)

Federal officials

- Elise Stefanik, U.S. representative from New York's 21st congressional district (2015–present) and Chair of the House Republican Conference (2021–present)

Statewide officials

- Bill Owens, former governor of Colorado (1999–2007)
- Glenn Youngkin, Governor of Virginia (2022–2026)

Organizations

- Colorado Fraternal Order of Police
- Republican Governors Association
- Stand for Health Freedom

Newspapers

- Fort Morgan Times
- The Gazette
Danielle Neuschwanger (ACP)

U.S. Executive Branch officials

- Michael Flynn, former U.S. National Security Advisor (2017) and former Director of the DIA (2012–2014) (Democratic)

=== Polling ===
Aggregate polls

Source of poll aggregation	Dates administered	Dates updated	Jared Polis (D)	Heidi Ganahl (R)	Other (Note: Calculated by taking the difference of 100% and all other candidates combined.)	Margin
Real Clear Politics	October 26 – November 5, 2022	November 8, 2022	53.0%	42.3%	4.7%	Polis +10.7
FiveThirtyEight	June 8 – November 8, 2022	November 8, 2022	54.1%	41.8%	4.1%	Polis +12.3
270ToWin	November 1–7, 2022	November 8, 2022	54.0%	42.0%	4.0%	Polis +12.0
Average			53.7%	42.0%	4.3%	Polis +11.7

Graphical summary

Poll source	Date(s) administered	Sample size (Note: Key: A – all adults RV – registered voters LV – likely voters V – unclear)	Margin of error	Jared Polis (D)	Heidi Ganahl (R)	Other	Undecided
co/efficient (R)	November 3–7, 2022	856 (LV)	± 3.3%	54%	43%	2% (Note: "Someone else" with 2%)	2%
Data for Progress (D)	November 2–5, 2022	1,983 (LV)	± 2.0%	55%	43%	2% (Note: Ruskusky (L) with 1%; "Another candidate" with 1%)	–
The Trafalgar Group (R)	October 30 – November 1, 2022	1,084 (LV)	± 2.9%	50%	43%	5% (Note: Ruskusky (L) with 2%; "Other" with 3%)	3%
Emerson College	October 26–29, 2022	1,000 (LV)	± 3.0%	54%	40%	4% (Note: Neuschwanger (ACP) with 2%; Fiorino (U) with 1%; Ruskusky (L) with <1%; "Someone else" with 1%)	3%
Emerson College	October 26–29, 2022	1,000 (LV)	± 3.0%	54%	41%	4% (Note: "Someone else" with 2%; Neuschwanger (ACP) with 2%; Fiorino (U) with 1%; Ruskusky (L) with <1%)	–
The Trafalgar Group (R) (Note: This poll was sponsored by Ganahl's campaign)	October 25–27, 2022	1,174 (LV)	± 2.9%	50%	42%	6% (Note: Neuschwanger (ACP) with 3%; Ruskusky (L) with 2%; Fiorino (U) with 1%)	3%
CU Boulder/YouGov	October 11–19, 2022	709 (LV)	± 4.4%	57%	41%	2% (Note: "Other" with 2%)	–
Civiqs	October 15–18, 2022	600 (LV)	± 5.0%	55%	40%	2% (Note: "Someone else" with 2%)	3%
Global Strategy Group (D) (Note: This poll was sponsored by ProgressNow Colorado, a liberal nonprofit organization.)	October 6–11, 2022	800 (LV)	± 3.5%	52%	34%	6% (Note: Ruskusky (L) with 4%; Neuschwanger (ACP) with 2%)	8%
Global Strategy Group (D)	October 6–11, 2022	800 (LV)	± 3.5%	54%	39%	–	7%
Marist College	October 3–6, 2022	1,127 (RV)	± 4.7%	54%	36%	2% (Note: "Another party's candidate" with 2%)	7%
Marist College	October 3–6, 2022	983 (LV)	± 5.0%	54%	39%	3% (Note: "Another party's candidate" with 3%)	5%
Data for Progress (D)	October 3–6, 2022	1,005 (LV)	± 3.0%	56%	39%	3% (Note: Ruskusky (L) with 1%; "Another candidate" with 2%)	2%
Keating Research/Magellan Strategies	September 18–26, 2022	1,060 (LV)	± 3.0%	51%	34%	2% (Note: Ruskusky (L) with 1%; Neuschwanger (ACP) with 1%)	12%
The Trafalgar Group (R)	September 20–24, 2022	1,078 (LV)	± 2.9%	49%	41%	4% (Note: Ruskusky (L) with 2%; "Other" with 2%)	6%
Emerson College	September 18–19, 2022	1,000 (LV)	± 3.0%	53%	36%	2% (Note: "Someone else" with 2%)	9%
Remington Research Group (R)	August 21–22, 2022	1,503 (LV)	± 2.5%	49%	42%	–	9%
The Trafalgar Group (R)	August 15–19, 2022	1,087 (LV)	± 2.9%	47%	42%	6% (Note: Ruskusky (L) with 4%; "Other" with 2%)	5%
Global Strategy Group (D)	June 2–8, 2022	400 (RV)	± 4.9%	50%	32%	5% (Note: Neuschwanger (ACP) with 5%)	13%
Global Strategy Group (D)	June 2–8, 2022	400 (RV)	± 4.9%	54%	37%	–	9%
Global Strategy Group (D)	February 11–15, 2022	400 (RV)	± 4.9%	53%	37%	–	10%
Global Strategy Group (D)	October 19–24, 2021	800 (RV)	± 3.5%	52%	35%	–	13%
Global Strategy Group (D)	June 17–23, 2021	800 (RV)	± 3.5%	54%	34%	–	12%

Hypothetical polling

Jared Polis vs. Greg Lopez

Poll source	Date(s) administered	Sample size	Margin of error	Jared Polis (D)	Greg Lopez (R)	Danielle Neuschwanger (ACP)	Undecided
Global Strategy Group (D)	June 2–8, 2022	400 (RV)	± 4.9%	52%	32%	6%	10%
Global Strategy Group (D)	June 2–8, 2022	400 (RV)	± 4.9%	53%	39%	–	8%

Jared Polis vs. Danielle Neuschwanger

Poll source	Date(s) administered	Sample size	Margin of error	Jared Polis (D)	Danielle Neuschwanger (R)	Undecided
Global Strategy Group (D)	February 11–15, 2022	400 (RV)	± 4.9%	51%	40%	9%

Jared Polis vs. generic Republican

Poll source	Date(s) administered	Sample size	Margin of error	Jared Polis (D)	Generic Republican	Undecided
Global Strategy Group (D)	June 2–8, 2022	800 (RV)	± 3.4%	54%	38%	8%
Global Strategy Group (D)	February 11–15, 2022	400 (RV)	± 4.9%	54%	38%	8%
Cygnal (R) (Note: This poll was sponsored by Ready Colorado)	January 12–13, 2022	630 (LV)	± 3.9%	49%	44%	8%
Global Strategy Group (D)	June 17–23, 2021	800 (RV)	± 3.5%	49%	39%	12%

=== Debates ===
2022 Colorado gubernatorial general election debates
No.	Date	Host	Moderator	Link	Democratic	Republican
Key: P Participant A Absent N Non-invitee I Invitee W Withdrawn						
Key: P Participant A Absent N Non-invitee I Invitee W Withdrawn					Jared Polis	Heidi Ganahl
2	Oct. 14, 2022	CBS Colorado			P	P

=== Results ===
State Senate district results

2022 Colorado gubernatorial election
Party	Candidate	Votes	%	±%
Democratic	Jared Polis (incumbent); Dianne Primavera (incumbent)	1,468,481	58.53%	+5.11%
Republican	Heidi Ganahl; Danny Moore	983,040	39.18%	−3.62%
Libertarian	Kevin Ruskusky; Michele Poague	28,939	1.15%	−1.60%
American Constitution	Danielle Neuschwanger; Darryl Gibbs	21,623	0.86%	N/A
Unity	Paul Noël Fiorino; Cynthia Munhos de Aquino Sirianni	6,687	0.27%	−0.75%
Write-in		60	0.0%	N/A
Total votes		2,540,680	100.0%	N/A
Turnout		2,540,680	66.28%	
Registered electors		3,833,360		
Democratic hold				

==== By county ====
Despite losing the state, Ganahl won 36 of 64 counties.

County	Jared Polis Democratic		Heidi Ganahl Republican		Various candidates Other parties		Margin		Total
County	#	%	#	%	#	%	#	%	Total
Adams	99,625	59.43%	63,960	38.15%	4,039	2.42%	35,665	21.28%	167,624
Alamosa	3,022	51.04%	2,674	45.16%	225	3.80%	348	5.88%	5,921
Arapahoe	162,304	63.12%	89,656	34.87%	5,166	2.01%	72,648	28.25%	257,126
Archuleta	3,641	46.62%	3,961	50.71%	208	2.67%	-320	-4.09%	7,810
Baca	298	17.05%	1,103	63.13%	346	18.82%	-757	-44.31%	1,747
Bent	627	34.26%	1,091	59.61%	112	6.13%	-464	-25.35%	1,830
Boulder	132,173	80.06%	30,454	18.45%	2,450	1.49%	101,719	61.61%	165,077
Broomfield	25,006	66.72%	11,796	31.47%	678	1.81%	13,210	35.25%	37,480
Chaffee	6,807	57.93%	4,646	39.54%	296	2.53%	2,161	18.39%	11,749
Cheyenne	115	12.57%	758	82.84%	42	4.59%	-643	-70.27%	915
Clear Creek	3,118	60.19%	1,919	37.04%	143	2.77%	1,199	23.15%	5,180
Conejos	1,659	48.08%	1,702	49.33%	89	2.59%	-43	-1.25%	3,450
Costilla	1,120	66.82%	507	30.25%	49	2.93%	613	36.57%	1,676
Crowley	405	29.39%	861	62.48%	112	8.13%	-456	-33.09%	1,378
Custer	1,140	34.12%	2,103	62.95%	98	2.93%	-963	-28.82%	3,341
Delta	5,651	35.50%	9,753	61.27%	513	3.23%	-4,102	-25.77%	15,917
Denver	234,250	82.36%	46,046	16.19%	4,128	1.45%	188,204	66.17%	284,424
Dolores	348	26.79%	806	62.04%	145	11.17%	-458	-35.25%	1,299
Douglas	93,022	48.78%	94,312	49.46%	3,356	1.76%	-1,290	-0.68%	190,690
Eagle	15,230	68.53%	6,661	29.97%	331	1.50%	8,569	38.56%	22,222
El Paso	133,447	46.82%	144,384	50.65%	7,196	2.53%	-10,937	-3.83%	285,027
Elbert	4,118	25.30%	11,618	71.37%	541	3.33%	-7,500	-46.07%	16,277
Fremont	7,165	35.88%	12,087	60.54%	713	3.58%	-4,922	-24.66%	19,965
Garfield	13,443	54.78%	10,444	42.56%	651	2.66%	2,999	12.22%	24,538
Gilpin	2,023	59.20%	1,302	38.10%	92	2.70%	721	21.10%	3,417
Grand	4,162	51.98%	3,649	45.58%	195	2.44%	513	6.40%	8,006
Gunnison	6,184	67.69%	2,733	29.91%	218	2.40%	3,451	37.78%	9,135
Hinsdale	246	48.14%	251	49.12%	14	2.74%	-5	-0.98%	511
Huerfano	2,102	54.47%	1,656	42.91%	101	2.62%	446	11.56%	3,859
Jackson	140	20.53%	526	77.12%	16	2.35%	-386	-56.59%	682
Jefferson	185,398	61.76%	108,638	36.19%	6,129	2.05%	76,760	25.57%	300,165
Kiowa	99	13.04%	562	74.04%	98	12.92%	-463	-61.00%	759
Kit Carson	475	15.69%	2,465	81.46%	86	2.85%	-1,990	-65.77%	3,026
La Plata	18,350	61.77%	10,689	35.98%	665	2.25%	7,661	25.79%	29,704
Lake	1,899	63.83%	991	33.31%	85	2.86%	908	30.52%	2,975
Larimer	105,588	59.88%	66,749	37.85%	3,991	2.27%	38,839	22.03%	176,328
Las Animas	3,411	50.98%	3,071	45.89%	209	3.13%	340	5.09%	6,691
Lincoln	390	18.57%	1,608	76.57%	102	4.86%	-1,218	-58.00%	2,100
Logan	1,860	22.53%	5,925	71.76%	471	5.71%	-4,065	-49.23%	8,256
Mesa	30,571	41.56%	40,376	54.89%	2,604	3.55%	-9,805	-13.33%	73,551
Mineral	320	45.20%	362	51.13%	26	3.67%	-42	-5.93%	708
Moffat	1,058	19.53%	4,174	77.04%	186	3.43%	-3,116	-57.51%	5,418
Montezuma	5,187	41.43%	6,772	54.09%	561	4.48%	-1,585	-12.66%	12,520
Montrose	7,529	36.02%	12,835	61.41%	536	2.57%	-5,306	-25.39%	20,900
Morgan	2,679	26.38%	7,090	69.82%	385	3.80%	-4,411	-43.44%	10,154
Otero	2,951	40.72%	4,053	55.93%	242	3.35%	-1,102	-15.21%	7,246
Ouray	2,242	62.87%	1,255	35.19%	69	1.94%	987	27.68%	3,566
Park	4,463	44.41%	5,271	52.45%	316	3.14%	-808	-8.04%	10,050
Phillips	384	19.50%	1,519	77.14%	66	3.36%	-1,135	-57.64%	1,969
Pitkin	7,565	79.00%	1,907	19.91%	104	1.09%	5,658	59.09%	9,576
Prowers	1,139	26.57%	2,847	66.42%	300	7.01%	-1,708	-39.85%	4,286
Pueblo	36,602	54.21%	28,645	42.43%	2,265	3.36%	7,957	11.78%	67,512
Rio Blanco	507	16.60%	2,408	78.87%	138	4.53%	-1,901	-62.27%	3,053
Rio Grande	2,140	43.19%	2,485	50.15%	330	6.66%	-345	-6.96%	4,955
Routt	9,238	66.59%	4,415	31.82%	220	1.59%	4,823	34.77%	13,873
Saguache	1,580	57.12%	1,061	38.36%	125	4.52%	519	18.76%	2,766
San Juan	372	68.89%	154	28.52%	14	2.59%	218	40.37%	540
San Miguel	3,199	78.29%	815	19.94%	72	1.77%	2,384	58.35%	4,086
Sedgwick	312	26.85%	807	69.45%	43	3.70%	-495	-42.60%	1,162
Summit	10,383	72.73%	3,650	25.57%	243	1.70%	6,733	47.16%	14,276
Teller	4,843	35.74%	8,430	62.21%	277	2.05%	-3,587	-26.47%	13,550
Washington	314	13.14%	1,971	82.50%	104	4.36%	-1,657	-69.36%	2,389
Weld	52,186	40.62%	72,542	56.46%	3,755	2.92%	-20,356	-15.84%	128,483
Yuma	656	16.55%	3,079	77.67%	229	5.78%	-2,423	-61.12%	3,964
Totals	1,468,481	58.53%	983,040	39.18%	57,309	2.29%	485,441	19.35%	2,508,830

==== Counties that flipped from Republican to Democratic ====
- Grand (largest city: Granby)
- Las Animas (largest city: Trinidad)

==== By congressional district ====
Polis won six of eight congressional districts, including one that elected a Republican.

District	Polis	Ganahl	Representative
1st	82%	16%	Diana DeGette
2nd	72%	26%	Joe Neguse
3rd	50%	47%	Lauren Boebert
4th	42%	55%	Ken Buck
5th	47%	50%	Doug Lamborn
6th	63%	35%	Jason Crow
7th	60%	38%	Ed Perlmutter (117th Congress)
7th	60%	38%	Brittany Pettersen (118th Congress)
8th	53%	44%	Yadira Caraveo

== Analysis ==
Incumbent governor Jared Polis easily won re-election by 19.3%, a margin much larger than aggregate polling predicted. Polis piled up massive margins in the heavily populous North Central Colorado Urban Area, which contains the state capital Denver plus its surrounding suburbs Aurora, Thornton, Lakewood, and Broomfield; in addition to other major cities Boulder and Fort Collins, home to the University of Colorado and Colorado State University respectively. Outside the Denver-Boulder-Fort Collins region, Polis also won a long row of counties along the Rocky Mountains from Routt in the north to La Plata in the south, which contains a number of liberal leaning ski resort towns like Telluride, Aspen, and Steamboat Springs. In Southern Colorado, a region historically known for coal mining, and home to a sizable Hispanic population, Polis managed to halt the decline in support for Democrats that had been taking place here since the mid-2010s in both state and federal races. Polis also won the relatively conservative city of Colorado Springs, the first Democrat to do so in recent history, along with greatly increasing his vote share in conservative-leaning urban counties compared to 2018. Polis's definitive victory likely helped other Democrats down the ballot to win their races or win them by comfortable margins, allowing Democrats to keep control of the state government.

Heidi Ganahl did best in the traditionally rural areas of Colorado bordering Kansas in the east, Utah in the west, and several larger counties including Weld (Greeley), Douglas (Castle Rock and Highlands Ranch), and El Paso (Colorado Springs). In the latter two counties, Ganahl significantly underperformed previous Republican nominees in these traditionally conservative urban counties, winning Douglas by 0.38% and El Paso by 3.97%, the closest either county had come to voting Democratic since 1994 and 1982 respectively. Ganahl failed to appeal to the large unaffiliated bloc of state voters along with political moderates. During her campaign, she highlighted her opposition to abortion (at odds with most Colorado voters), utilized incendiary right-wing rhetoric in regards to several social and cultural issues, and courted figures involved with pushing conspiracy theories about elections.

Prior to the election, an article by Daniel Strain from the University of Colorado reported that 71% of Colorado voters said their state's elections will be conducted "fairly and accurately", while 54% said the same for other elections across the United States. 53% of voters also disapproved of the Supreme Court's decision in Dobbs v. Jackson Women's Health Organization to overturn Roe v. Wade. 63% of voters said Joe Biden won the 2020 election, although Biden had a 52% disapproval among Centennial State voters compared to 39% who approved of him.

Despite Biden's low approval, a Marist poll conducted in October found that amongst 1,221 Colorado adults, Governor Polis had a 50% approval, while Ganahl suffered from low name recognition, with 42% having either never heard of her or were unsure how to rate her. The same poll also found that 34% of voters were most concerned about inflation, followed by preserving democracy at 29%, abortion at 16%, crime at 7%, followed by healthcare and immigration at 6% each.

== See also ==
- 2022 Colorado elections
- 2022 United States Senate election in Colorado

== Notes ==
Partisan clients
