= American Association of Bovine Practitioners =

Nonprofit veterinarian association

The American Association of Bovine Practitioners (AABP) is a nonprofit association of veterinarians who specialize in the care and treatment of bovines such as cattle. AABP has 13 districts covering the United States and Canada, but welcomes membership by veterinarians and veterinary students worldwide. It is the only association for bovine veterinarians, and the largest such association in the world.

The organization was founded in 1965. It was founded by Dr. Lyle Baker, a veterinarian and faculty member at the Cornell University College of Veterinary Medicine. The organization includes in its mission the provision of continuing education to promote the welfare of cattle, the economic success of livestock owners, awareness of issues critical to food animal industries, and career opportunities for veterinarians practicing bovine medicine. In 2011, the organization claimed more than 6,000 members.

The organization is considered a critical player in the development of U.S. government livestock health policies through its publication of research, its testimony before Congress and executive branch regulatory agencies, and its members' lobbying. It also establishes guidelines for appropriate methods of humane euthanasia for cattle and other bovines.

In May 2011, the organization made national headlines when its Ad Hoc Committee on Rural Veterinary Practice issued a report that concluded there was no shortage in the U.S. of veterinarians engaged in large-animal rural practice. The report's conclusions were in stark contrast to those of most American veterinary schools (many of which increased class size, in part, to meet this shortage) and of the American Veterinary Medical Association (which sponsored in 2011 the Veterinarian Services Investment Act [H.R.3519], federal legislation which would establish a federal grant program to support veterinarians in rural practice). Dr. M. Gatz Riddell Jr., executive vice president of the AABP, said that veterinary schools fill these seats with high-tuition out-of-state students, which helps "prop up tight veterinary school finances [but] also ensures higher debt load for many of these veterinary students."

== Bibliography ==
- "American Association of Bovine Practitioners." Encyclopedia of Associations. Detroit: Gale Research Co., 1972.
- Curtis, Stanley E. "Dairy Cattle: Behavior Management and State of Being." In Encyclopedia of Animal Science. Wilson G. Pond, ed. Boca Raton, Fla.: CRC Press, 2004
- Kahrs, Robert F. Global Livestock Health Policy: Challenges, Opportunities, and Strategies for Effective Action. Ames, Iowa: Iowa State University Press, 2004.
- Pomeroy, Leon R., ed. New Dynamics of Preventive Medicine. Miami: Intercontinental Medical Book Corp., 1974.
