= Committee to Defeat the President =

American conservative political action committee

Committee to Defend the President
- Predecessor: Committee to Defeat the President (2021-2025)
- Formation: 2013
- Type: Independent Expenditure (PAC)
- Registration no.: C00544767

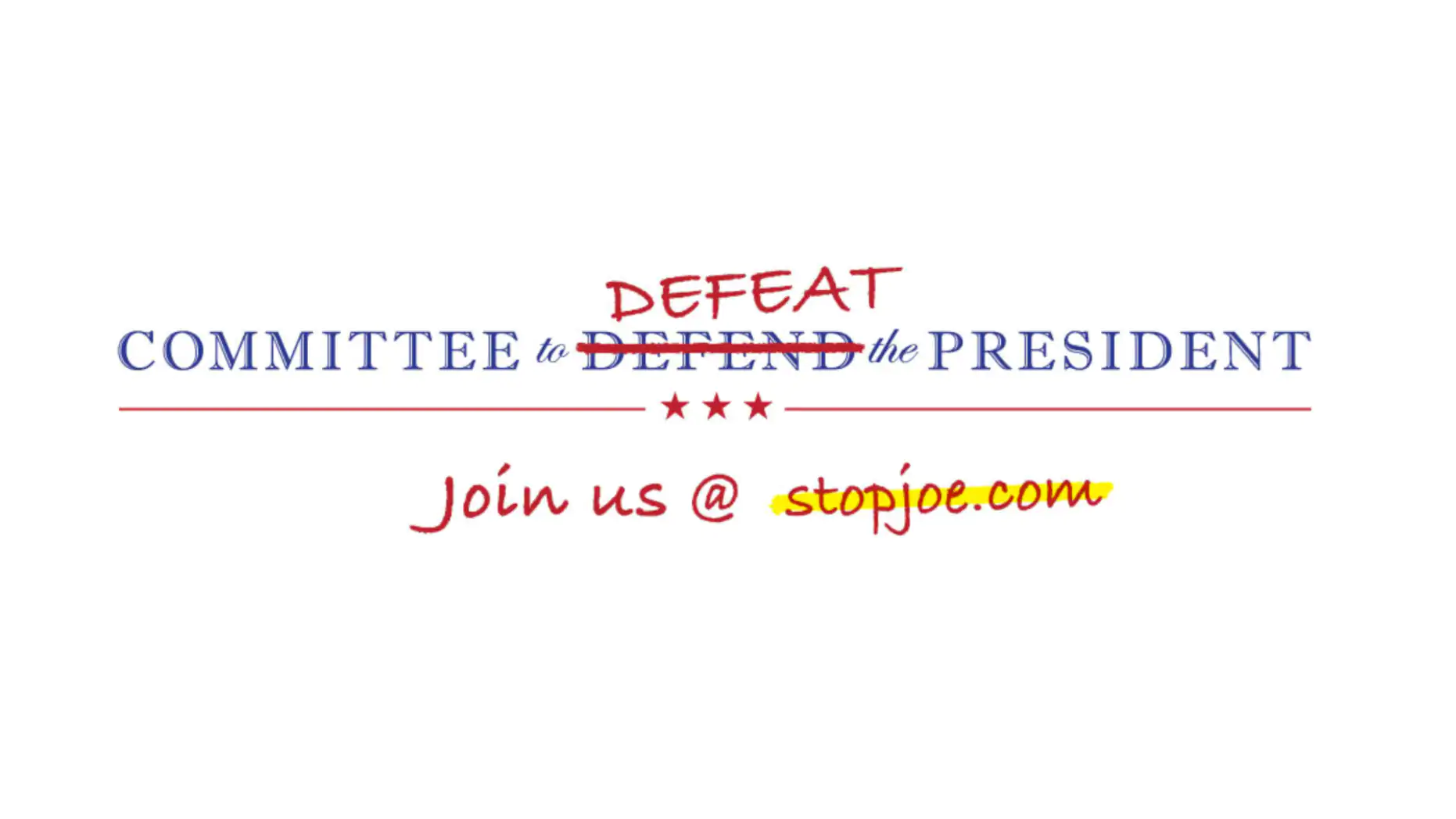
Committee to Defeat the President

The Committee to Defend the President was first established as the hybrid Stop Hillary PAC in 2013. The PAC changed its name to the Committee to Defend the President in 2017. Ted Harvey, a former Colorado state senator, chairs the committee.

The committee was dedicated to President Trump and his agenda, advocating for his re-election in 2020. The PAC was one of the two largest non-party outside spenders during the 2020 election cycle, investing millions of dollars into paid advertising and grassroots activities in battleground states. It functions as both a traditional political action committee and as a super PAC.

After the 2020 election, the PAC changed its name to the Committee to Defeat the President, with Harvey claiming its "new mission is to save Americans from the radical, dangerous policies of the Biden-Harris administration."

== Organization ==
According to paperwork filed with the FEC, the hybrid PAC's founder is political consultant Guy Short. Campaign finance lawyer Dan Backer was listed as the PAC's first treasurer. According to federal records, the Committee to Defend the President's top vendor is political consulting firm Campaign Solutions, whose vice president of fundraising is also Guy Short.

Ted Harvey, a former member of the Colorado Senate, is the chairman of the Committee to Defend the President.

The PAC spent more than $6 million throughout 2015 and 2016, according to FEC records. However, federal records indicate that only around one-fourth of this amount went toward advertisements, robocalls, or other communication that supported or opposed a specific candidate. Most of the rest of the money went to vendors in Northern Virginia and Ohio, who were mostly political consultants.

== Political activity ==
=== 2014 election cycle ===
Stop Hillary PAC was founded in 2013. During the 2014 election cycle, the PAC raised more than $1 million to oppose Hillary Clinton.

=== 2016 presidential campaign ===
In 2016, Stop Hillary PAC raised nearly $7 million to oppose Clinton in her bid for the presidency, spending roughly $3.5 million in independent expenditures. Harvey stated that the PAC would spend up to $1 million to re-air ads that criticized Clinton's handling of the 2012 Benghazi attacks. The PAC ran a TV advertisement featuring former Ambassador Christopher Stevens’ grave.

=== Support of Donald Trump ===
Harvey has stated that his mission is to "defend the president from day one." His PAC runs ads, conducts polls, publishes op-eds, and mobilizes activists.

In January 2017, the committee ran a TV ad urging viewers to call a toll-free number and pledge “to defend Donald Trump.” It has also run ads touting Trump's actions in his first 100 days, such as nominating Judge Neil Gorsuch to the Supreme Court.

=== FEC complaints ===
In December 2017, the committee filed an administrative complaint with the Federal Election Commission (FEC), accusing Clinton's 2016 campaign and the Democratic Party of "an unprecedented, massive, nationwide multi-million dollar conspiracy." The complaint alleged an $84 million money laundering scheme between the Clinton campaign, Democratic National Committee, Democratic state parties, and donors, claimed to be in violation of campaign finance laws. In response to the allegation, the DNC called the claim a "political stunt" and pointed out that the Trump campaign had raised over $100 million from 20 Republican state parties. The FEC did not act on the committee's administrative complaint, and the committee sued the FEC in April 2018 in U.S. district court in DC. In May 2019, the committee's lawsuit was dismissed the suit pursuant to a joint stipulation of the parties.

In January 2023, the Committee filed an FEC complaint accusing Rep. Katie Porter (D-CA) of illegally reaping the benefits of the University of California, Irvine's "subsidized affordable housing." According to the Committee's complaint, the subsidy amounts to an illegal campaign contribution. The FEC subsequently agreed to investigate the matter.

In March 2023, the Committee targeted Rep. Cori Bush (D-MO) with an FEC complaint, claiming Bush violated federal campaign finance laws by paying her husband, Cortney Merritts, for security in 2022, even though Merritts did not have a license to perform security functions in the congresswoman's district. Harvey called Bush "corrupt." In August, the group also sent new complaints and supplements for previous complaints to the Office of Congressional Ethics, Department of Justice, D.C. Department of Licensing and Consumer Protection, and St. Louis Metropolitan Police Department over the alleged campaign finance violations.

=== 2018 Tennessee Senate campaign ===
The committee was heavily involved in Tennessee's Senate race, supporting Rep. Marsha Blackburn's (R-TN) successful campaign. In September 2018, the Committee announced more than $900,000 in spending to boost Blackburn's candidacy.

=== 2019 North Carolina congressional campaign ===
In August 2019, the committee announced its support for Dan Bishop's congressional campaign in North Carolina's 9th district, pledging $200,000 to boost Bishop's candidacy. In September 2019, Bishop won the special election, defeating Democrat Dan McCready with 50.7 percent of the vote.

=== 2020 presidential campaign ===
During the 2020 election cycle, the committee raised more than $16 million and spent over $14 million in support of Trump's reelection campaign. In June 2019, the committee partnered with the pro-Trump Great America PAC, pledging to spend $1 million with the goal of registering one million new Trump voters. Harvey has also pledged $1 million expenditures in key battleground states, such as Florida, Michigan, North Carolina, and Pennsylvania.

The committee ran ads criticizing Democrats for impeaching Trump. In December 2019, the PAC praised Representative Jeff Van Drew for leaving the Democratic Party after voting against the impeachment of Trump, running a $250,000 advertising campaign in Van Drew's New Jersey district.

During the Democratic primaries, the committee spent $250,000 on advertising campaigns in each of Nevada, North Carolina, and South Carolina to attack Joe Biden. The ads targeted Biden's stance on immigration and questioned why President Barack Obama has not endorsed him. In New Hampshire, the PAC used billboards and signs to tie Democratic president candidates to "The Squad" (with the messaging "The Squad. Open borders. Socialism. Green New Deal") and used a Joe Biden "Corn Pops" prop.

Several of the committee's anti-Biden ads have been deceptive:

- An ad run by the committee in the lead-up to the South Carolina Democratic primary, featured a narrator reading a passage from Barack Obama's 1995 book Dreams from My Father over text criticizing of Biden, giving the misleading impression that Obama was criticizing Biden. In fact, the passage from Obama's book quotes a barber in an entirely different context. The ad prompted Obama's representatives to send a cease-and-desist letter to the super PAC, demanding that the misleading ad be taken down; the committee refused and doubled down on its anti-Biden advertising.
- One six- or seven-second Facebook ad run by the committee misleadingly accused Biden of using racial slurs in 1985; in fact, Biden had been quoting a white lawmaker to expose the comments as racist.
- In June 2020, the committee released an ad titled Lost His Mind, suggesting that Biden has dementia and "lost" his mind; the committee spent $400,000 to run the ad on cable news, Arizona broadcast networks, and social media.
- In a Spanish-language ad run in July 2020, the committee attacked Biden, falsely claiming, "He promised his party an African American Vice President. Not a Latino ... Why aren't Latinos good enough for Joe?" In fact, Biden made no such "promise" to pick an African American running mate, and he considered several contenders from a variety of ethnic backgrounds for the role. U.S. Senator Bob Menendez of New Jersey criticized the PAC for seeking to divide blacks and Latinos.

In August 2020, Facebook, Inc. temporarily barred the committee from running Facebook ads due to its repeated false posts, stating: "As a result of the Committee to Defend the President's repeated sharing of content determined by third-party fact-checkers to be false, they will not be permitted to advertise for a period of time on our platform." The company did not specify the duration of the suspension. From 2018 to August 2020, the committee had spent about $300,000 in Facebook ads.

In September and October 2020, the Committee spent $2 million in separate ad buys attacking Biden in Arizona, seeking to tie him to antifa; "rioters" and "looters"; and "the devastation and ruin of our beautiful cities" (which the group's ads called "just another day in Joe Biden's America").

In December 2020, the Committee backed a lawsuit over election monitor access in Georgia's Cobb County, the first legal victory for Republicans in the state leading up to the Senate run-off elections. Harvey applauded the Cobb County Superior Court for "helping us bring accuracy, fairness, and transparency to Georgia."

=== 2022 election cycle ===
In January 2021, the PAC changed its name to the Committee to Defeat the President, pledging a seven-figure investment "to expose the Biden-Harris administration and other Democrats for their left-wing politics."

The Committee mobilized heavily in North Carolina, supporting Rep. Ted Budd's successful campaign for U.S. Senate and opposing Cheri Beasley's alleged "left-wing radicalism." It spent more than $1 million on the Senate race, including social media advertising, get-out-the-vote initiatives, and voter contact efforts.

The Committee also came out in support of Republican candidate Herschel Walker in Georgia's run-off election, launching a roughly $300,000 ad campaign featuring Walker himself.

=== 2024 election cycle ===
In September 2023, the Committee officially endorsed Trump's 2024 campaign. In a Washington Times op-ed column, Harvey claimed Trump was "the most effective champion of conservative values of any president" in his lifetime.
