= John Evans (Colorado state senator) =

American politician in Colorado

John Evans is an American lawyer and politician.

In 1994, Evans was elected to the Colorado Board of Education. He was seated in the 30th district of the Colorado Senate in 1998, defeating Barbara O'Grady in the general election. He won reelection in 2002, against Jerri Hill. Evans did not run in the 2006 election cycle due to term limits, and was succeeded in office by Ted Harvey.
