= Rodney Demery =

American police chief, author, TV host and former homicide detective

Rodney Lamar Demery
- Born: Shreveport, Louisiana, United States
- Education: Louisiana State University; New Mexico State University Alamogordo
- Police career
- Department: Beaver Falls Police Department; Shreveport Police Department; Caddo Parish District Attorney's Office; Grambling State University Police Department
- Service years: 1994-1999; 1999-2016; 2016-2018; 2022-present
- Other work: TV host, narrator, writer
- Military career
- Allegiance: United States
- Branch: United States Navy
- Conflicts: Gulf War

Rodney Demery is an American author, TV host and former homicide detective, currently serving as the chief of the Grambling State University Police Department. He is best known for his role as the TV host and narrator on the Murder Chose Me TV series which airs on Investigation Discovery since 2017.

== Career ==
Rodney Demery is a veteran of the United States Navy. He served in both Operation Desert Storm and Operation Desert Shield.

Upon leaving the Navy, he served as an officer with, and then the chief of, the Beaver Falls Police Department in Beaver Falls, Pennsylvania. In 1999, he resigned from the Beaver Falls Police Department to join the Shreveport Police Department. In 2001, he was assigned to the Department's violent crimes unit as a homicide detective. During his career with the Shreveport Police, he worked on over 250 homicide cases. In a 2016 interview with KTBS 3, Demery said his achievement in solving homicide cases resulted from personal encounters with violent homicides, referring to his mother's murder and his brother Patrick's conviction for homicide. He understood both the bereaved families and the suspects.

Demery is S.W.A.T. certified and a hostage negotiator as well as having experience in undercover work. As a homicide detective, Rodney Demery looked into his mother's homicide case. He tracked down her killer, his stepfather, and found him in bad health.

Demery worked as a homicide investigator for the Caddo Parish District Attorney's Office until July 2018, when he resigned to focus on television and film projects. However, on May 27, 2022, Demery was hired by Grambling State University as its new chief of university police.

=== Politics ===
In 2018, the Shreveport Times reported he considered running for Shreveport Mayor. In July 2018, Demery denied interest in local politics. He confirmed a desire to become the chief of Shreveport Police, with multiple 2018 mayoral candidates approaching him for the position if elected. In 2018, Rodney Demery endorsed Lee O. Savage for Mayor, who lost the election to Adrian Perkins.

=== Film ===
Rodney is the narrator of Investigation Discovery's 2017 crime drama Murder Chose Me, in which he narrates the show in the first person.

The crime TV show is based on detective Demery's work at the Shreveport Police homicide unit. It highlights the homicide cases he worked on during the 14 years he was active. The show was renewed for a second season on May 19, 2017. Murder Chose Me was renewed for the third season on November 8, 2018 and premiered in June 2019.

=== Books ===
Rodney Demery has written two books on Amazon Kindle. His 2011 title, Things My Daughters Need to Know: A Cop and Father's View of Sex, Relationships and Happiness was an Amazon Bestseller when it was released. Demery released his second book, No Place for Race: Why We Need to Address Economic and Social Factors That Are Crushing Us Every Day, in October 2013. The book appeared on the 10 Best Black Books of 2013 list published annually by literary critic Kam Williams. It has also been featured and reviewed on multiple news outlets throughout the United States.

== See also ==
- Greg Kading
