= Humane Colorado =

American animal shelter in Denver

Humane Colorado, formerly Dumb Friends League (DFL), is an animal shelter based in Denver, Colorado. Established in 1910, DFL/HC is the largest independent, nonprofit community-based animal shelter/humane society in the Rocky Mountain region.

== History ==
Dumb Friends League was organized by Jean M. Gower. The name of the organization was inspired by the 1897 London animal charity Our Dumb Friends League (since renamed Blue Cross). At that time, "dumb" in the sense of "lacking speech" was often used to refer to animals.

The early organization educated the public on humane animal treatment using lantern slide lectures. It provided veterinary services and shelters, and purchased an ambulance to transport large animals. When the league took over management of the local dog pound, Gower replaced the gas chamber with potassium cyanide, considered to be a less-cruel method of euthanasia.

In March 2025, after 115 years as Dumb Friends League, the group rebranded itself Humane Colorado.

== Services ==
Considered one of America's leading animal shelters, DFL offers adoption services for dogs, cats, and horses, spay and neuter services, public education, and youth camps. DFL has one of the highest placement rates in the United States. In 2018, it processed over 18,000 pets and over 300 horses. DFL typically has more cats than dogs available for adoption, and cats tend to remain at the shelter longer.

DFL's help line receives thousands of calls a year, answered by staff and volunteers who provide advice for dealing with pets' behavioral problems. Staff at DFL provide a two-week course to train workers at other shelters, a program called Pets For Life which is administered by the Humane Society of the United States. The seminars cover pet behavior problems, canine and feline body language, no-punishment dog training techniques, shelter management, and skills for dealing with the humans adopting their animals.

DFL partnered with the Behavior Reduction in Kids (BARK) program at the Mental Health Center of Denver which engaged the participants in training and rehabilitating dogs as part of individual treatment. In 2018, DFL partnered with Peaceful Animal Adoption Shelter (PAAS) in Oklahoma to match homeless animals in Oklahoma with adoptive homes in Colorado.

In 2005, DFL launched a class for training new cat owners called Kitty Kindergarten. The Kitty Comfort program at DFL, which includes interaction with volunteers, helps address the stress that cats often feel when in shelters. In 2010, DFL began offering a monthlong cat-training class called Clicks & Tricks, based on clicker training, a positive reinforcement training method.

Horses are surrendered to the Dumb Friends League Harmony Equine Center, and DFL sends horses to the Right Horse Program at Colorado State University for training and rehabilitation.

== Fundraising ==
In 1989, DFL received a bequest of $2.1 million from the estate of Margaret Collbran, granddaughter of Adolph Coors. DFL added a telethon to their fundraising efforts in 1982. Its telethon in 2007 raised $212,000. DFL also hosts the annual Furry Scurry, a walk to support homeless pets, its largest fundraiser.
