= Ted Harvey =

American politician

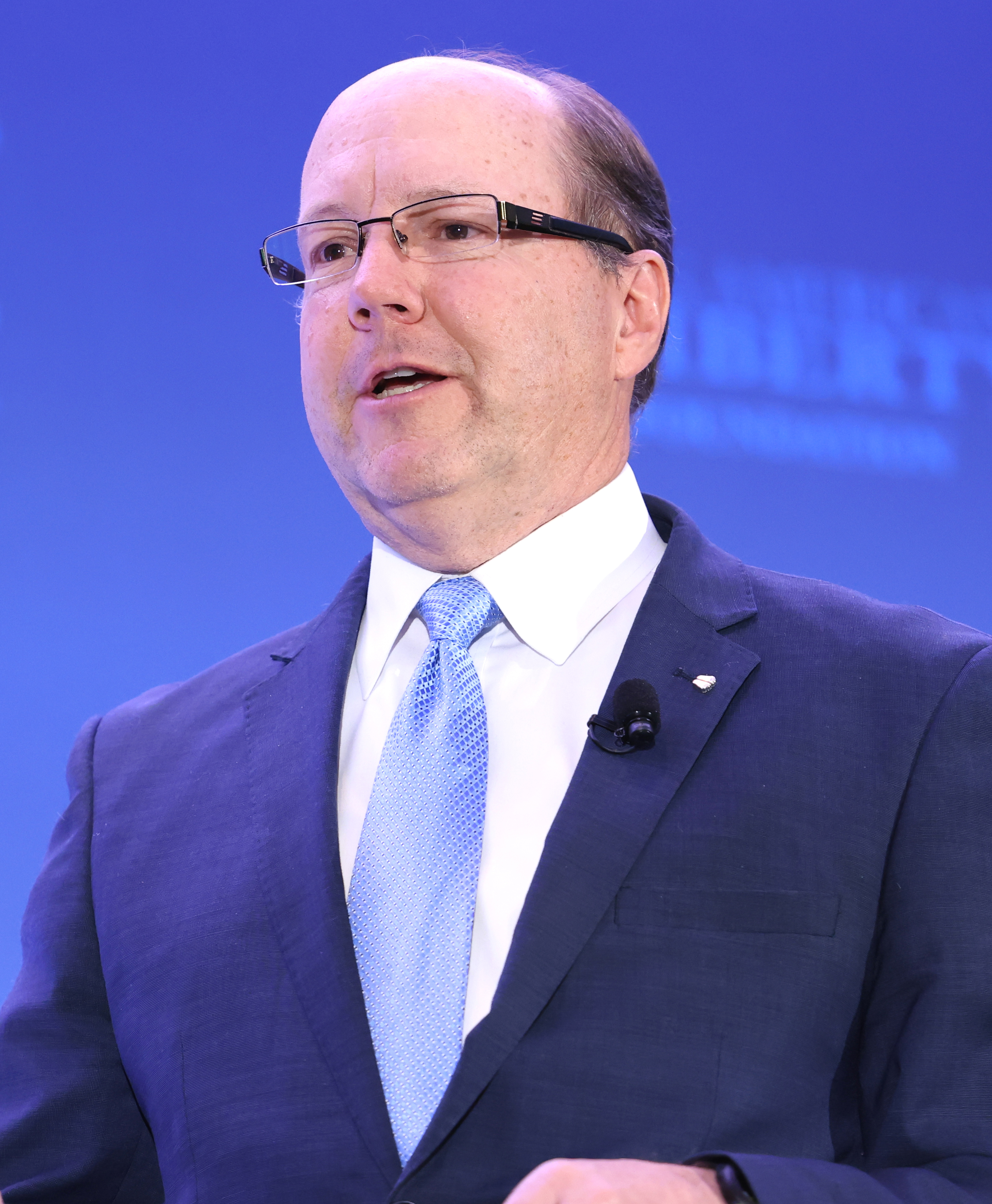
- Harvey at the 2024 Hazlitt Summit hosted by Young Americans for Liberty Foundation

Member of the Colorado Senate from the 30th district
- In office January 2007 – January 7, 2015
- Preceded by: John Evans
- Succeeded by: Chris Holbert

Member of the Colorado House of Representatives from the 43rd district
- In office January 2001 – January 2007
- Succeeded by: Frank McNulty

Personal details
- Born: Colorado Springs, Colorado, U.S.
- Party: Republican
- Spouse: Janie
- Education: Colorado State University (BA); University of Colorado, Denver (MPA)

Ted Harvey is an American politician. In 2001, Harvey was elected to the Colorado House of Representatives as a Republican, representing the 43rd House District. Elected in 2006 to the Colorado Senate, he represented Senate District 30, which encompasses Northern Douglas County—Highlands Ranch, Lone Tree, Parker, and Roxborough Park. He was also one of Colorado's delegates to the 2020 Republican National Convention in Charlotte, North Carolina, in addition to Republican National Conventions in 2012, 2016, and prior election cycles.

Harvey was chair of the Committee to Defeat the President, an anti-Biden super PAC. The PAC was previously known as the Committee to Defend the President, one of the largest pro-Trump super PACs in the country, but changed its name after the 2020 election.

== Early life and education ==
Harvey is a native of Colorado Springs, where he attended Air Academy Junior High and High School. He completed his Bachelor of Arts degree in psychology, history, and political science from Colorado State University and received a Masters of Public Administration from the University of Colorado Denver School of Public Affairs.

== Career ==
At the age of 22, Harvey received a political appointment to serve as a staffer in the White House Office during the Reagan administration. After this assignment, he secured a staff position in the Colorado House of Representatives as the house reading clerk. He later became the program director at the Independence Institute, a libertarian Colorado think tank, and served as the district office manager for Congressman Joel Hefley.

=== Colorado Legislature ===
In late-December 2001, Harvey was selected to fill a vacancy in the Colorado House of Representatives. He was sworn into office in January 2002.

Harvey was re-elected to the Colorado House in 2002.

During the 2003–2004 General Assembly session, Harvey was appointed to serve as vice chair of the Agriculture Livestock & Natural Resources and chair of the Capital Development Committee.

In 2006, Harvey was elected to Senate District 30, defeating his Democratic opponent Shelly Tokerud with 62.7% of the vote.

In 2010 Harvey sought re-election to the Senate. He faced no opposition in the primaries, and defeated his Democratic opponent Katherine Facchinello with 67% of the vote.

In 2011, Senator Harvey's major focus regarding legislation was working to maintain the integrity of the Colorado electoral process. He sponsored several bills that sought to do this, such as SB11-018, SB11-057, and HB11-1003.

These measures would have required proof of citizenship to vote in Colorado elections, and defined what type of identification qualified for election-related purposes.

=== 2008 congressional election ===
In early 2008, Harvey announced his candidacy for the Colorado's 6th congressional district. In the run-off between Harvey and State Senator Steve Ward. Harvey won the Republican nomination with 55 percent of the Assembly votes.

Harvey's campaign struggled to gain momentum after the District Assembly, and he ultimately finished third in the Republican primary vote in August 2008, with 14 percent of the total vote, finishing behind Wil Armstrong and Mike Coffman, the ultimate successor.

=== 2024 congressional campaign ===
Harvey was a candidate for the Republican nomination to represent Colorado's 4th congressional district in the 2024 congressional elections. He was eliminated at the Republican convention to Lauren Boebert and did not run in the primary election.

=== Stop Hillary PAC/Committee to Defend the President ===
The Stop Hillary PAC is a Carey Committee, also known as a hybrid PAC, established in 2013. Harvey served as the PAC's chairman. The committee's aim was to oppose Hillary Clinton during the 2016 United States presidential election. The group was active in airing ads highlighting Clinton's role in the 2012 Benghazi attack.

After the election of President Donald Trump, the PAC changed its name to the "Committee to Defend the President," becoming one of the largest pro-Trump super PACs in the country. Following the 2020 election, the PAC renamed itself the Committee to Defeat the President to oppose President Joe Biden's agenda, with Harvey remaining chairman.
