= Heidi Ganahl =

American businessperson and entrepreneur

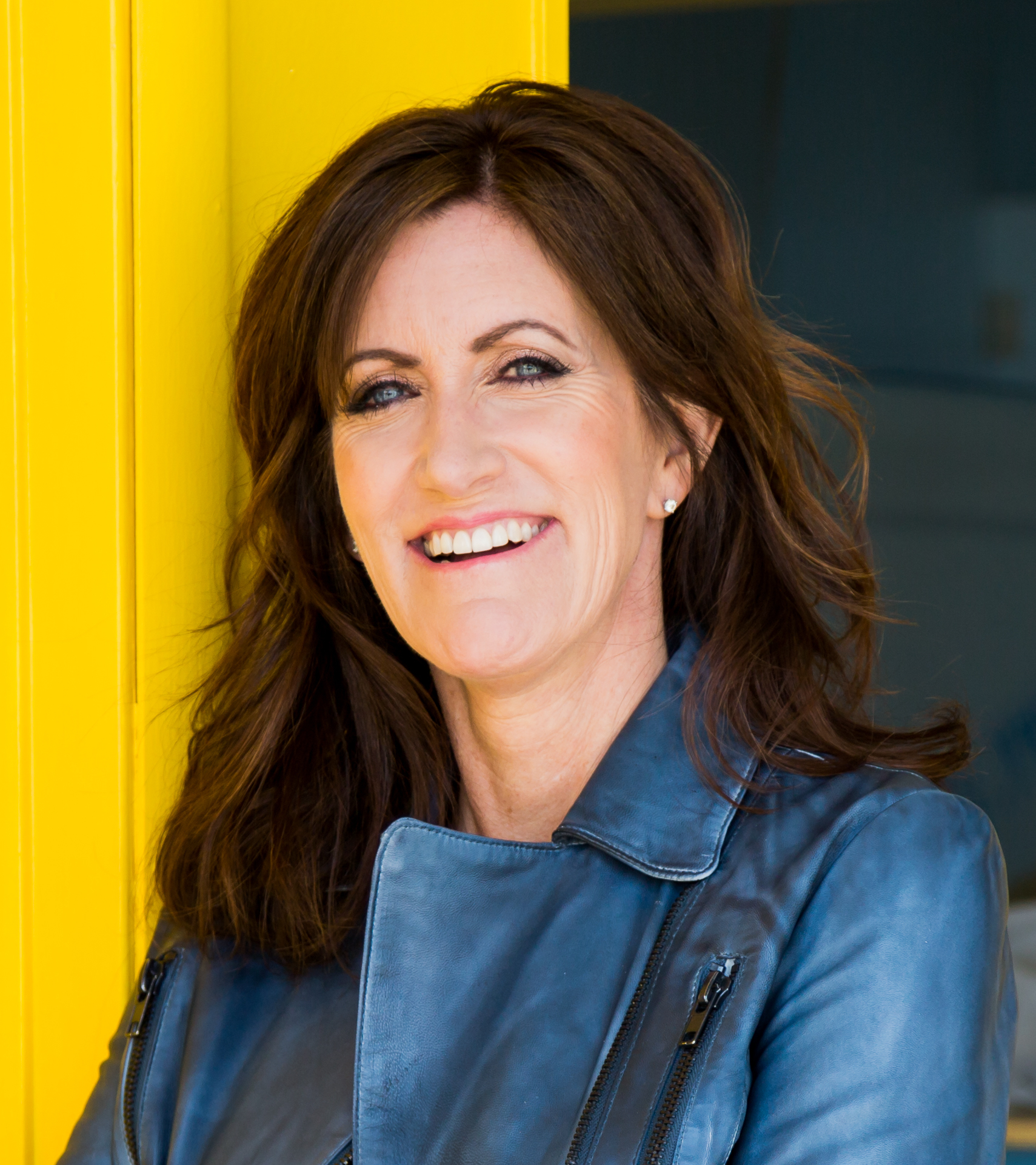
- Ganahl in 2019

Member of the University of Colorado Board of Regents from the at-large district
- In office January 11, 2017 – January 5, 2023
- Preceded by: Steve Bosley
- Succeeded by: Lesley Smith

Personal details
- Born: Heidi Ann Haight; September 9, 1966 (age 60) Orange County, California, U.S.
- Party: Republican
- Education: University of Colorado, Boulder (BBA); University of Denver (MHA)
- Website: Official website

Heidi Ann Ganahl (née Haight; born September 9, 1966) is an American businesswoman, entrepreneur, author, and formerly an elected member of the University of Colorado Board of Regents. She is the founder and former CEO of Camp Bow Wow, an international pet care franchise. In November 2016, she was elected Regent of the University of Colorado. As of 2026, she is the most recent Republican to hold statewide office in Colorado.

Ganahl was the Republican nominee for governor of Colorado in the 2022 election, losing to Democrat Jared Polis.

== Background and education ==
Ganahl was born in Orange County, California, where she lived until she was 12. Her family then moved to Monument, Colorado, where she attended Lewis-Palmer High School. She earned a bachelor's degree in business from the University of Colorado Boulder, followed by a master's degree in healthcare administration from the University of Denver. In the spring of 1994, her husband, Bion Flammang, died in a plane crash.

== Career ==
In her early years, Ganahl worked for the advertising firms Chapman Warwick and Salvati Montgomery Sakoda. She then held positions in account management at DUSA Pharmaceuticals, Bristol-Myers Squibb and Rhone Poulenc (now Sanofi-Aventis), and founded the Maginot Group. She also launched a baby room catalog company, Nursery Works. In 2000, she launched Camp Bow Wow, which is now North America's largest and fastest-growing pet care franchise. Camp Bow Wow was acquired in August 2014 by VCA, Inc. Ganahl is also the founder and president of the Colorado-based Fight Back Foundation, which funds and mentors social entrepreneurs seeking to help kids in Colorado.

In 2015, Ganahl was appointed by Colorado Governor John Hickenlooper to the School Safety and Youth in Crisis Committee established by Colorado Senate Bill 15-214, to study school safety and threat prevention in public and private schools, programs and methods for identifying and monitoring students in crisis, standardized protocols for school personnel for assessing potential threats, and the implementation of the Claire Davis School Safety Act.

In 2019, Ganahl launched the lifestyle brand SheFactor.

== CU Board of Regents ==
Ganahl was elected to the CU Board of Regents as an at-large member in 2016. She wants to see more conservatives (student, staff and faculty levels) at the university. Ganahl also recently sponsored an anti-critical race theory proposition at the University of Colorado, which was defeated in a 3-6 vote of the Board. Regents Ganahl, Chance Hill, and Susan Sharkey voted for the proposition.

== 2022 Colorado gubernatorial election ==
On September 10, 2021, Ganahl filed paperwork with the Secretary of State's office indicating that she was seeking the Republican nomination for Governor of Colorado in the 2022 election.

On June 28, 2022, Ganahl secured the GOP nomination for Governor of Colorado. On November 8, 2022, Ganahl lost to Democratic incumbent Jared Polis by a margin of 58.5% to 39.2%.

== Political positions ==
=== Trump and the 2020 election ===
Ganahl considers herself to be a supporter of president Donald Trump. Ganahl has declined to state if the results of the 2020 presidential election are legitimate. After the 2020 presidential election, Ganahl praised John Eastman, a controversial lawyer who incorrectly claimed that Kamala Harris is not an American citizen and would not be eligible to be Vice President. Eastman also helped Trump in his attempts to overturn the election results.

In a November 2021 event, Ganahl suggested that winning by large margins will override election fraud, implying that substantial voter fraud exists. In the same event, Ganahl also endorsed a political group that pushes claims of election fraud in the 2020 election. While praising the election system in Colorado, Ganahl also expressed uncertainty over the election process of other states during the 2020 election. Similarly, Ganahl has raised doubt about the election, voicing concern over what she perceived as "rules being weakened before the [2020] election in some states".

=== Healthcare ===
In the 2021 legislative session, Ganahl opposed the Colorado Affordable Health Care Option, a measure that aimed at lowering healthcare costs by creating a public health insurance option. Writing an op-ed and referring to a brain tumor she got removed, Ganahl stated "The proposed Colorado Affordable Health Care Option is not the broad solution politicians claim. With unintended consequences to quality and access, it may force hospitals to eliminate some critical functions. It may even endanger miracles like mine."

=== Education ===
Ganahl is opposed to proposals offering tuition-free enrollment in community colleges. Regarding sexual assault on campus, Ganahl has acknowledged it as a serious issue but has downplayed its prevalence, saying "Twenty-eight percent of students at CU said that they had been sexually assaulted, but it included all kinds of things like inappropriate touching, and catcalling, etc. I think the actual rape number was nine percent […] it's still nine percent too many. But you know, that's self-reported, so."

Ganahl has claimed that conservatives at colleges are being "silenced" and has attempted to form organizations that promote conservative viewpoints on-campus.

Party political offices
Preceded by Walker Stapleton	Republican nominee for Governor of Colorado; 2022	Succeeded by Victor Marx
