= Richard Holtorf =

American politician

Member of the Colorado House of Representatives from the 63rd district
- In office January 9, 2023 – January 8, 2025
- Preceded by: Redistricted
- Succeeded by: Dusty Johnson

Member of the Colorado House of Representatives from the 64th district
- In office December 28, 2019 – January 9, 2023
- Preceded by: Kimmi Lewis
- Succeeded by: Redistricted

Personal details
- Party: Republican
- Education: Colorado State University (BS); Boston University (MBA); United States Army War College (MS)
- Website: State House website

Richard Alonso Holtorf is an American politician and rancher serving as a member of the Colorado House of Representatives from 63rd district, which includes all or part of Logan, Morgan, Phillips, Sedgwick, Washington, Weld, and Yuma counties, including the communities of Sterling, Fort Morgan, Brush, Yuma, and Wray. Prior to 2023 and reapportionment, Holtorf represented the 64th house district. He assumed office on December 28, 2019.

== Background ==
A lifelong resident of Washington County, Holtorf graduated from Akron High School and attended Colorado State University. He was in Army ROTC and was commissioned as an Army aviation officer in 1987. He served in aviation-related jobs in the Army on active duty and in the Army reserve for 29 years. His service included two tours in Afghanistan. He earned a degree from the U.S. Army War College. In 2016, he retired at the rank of colonel. In 2022, he described himself as "a third-generation cattle rancher, feedlot manager, dryland farmer, and state representative".

== Political career ==
Holtorf was appointed to the Colorado House of Representatives after 64th district incumbent Kimmi Lewis died of cancer in late 2019. The Republican vacancy committee chose Holtorf from a field of five candidates, with Holtorf receiving 76 votes out of 115 delegates. Holtorf ran for the seat in 2020 and was elected to a full term.

In the 2020 reapportionment process, Holtorf's residence in Washington County moved from house district 64 to house district 63. District 63 is geographically smaller than the former district 64 and includes Logan, Morgan, Phillips, Sedgwick, Washington, Weld, and Yuma counties, including the communities of Sterling, Fort Morgan, Brush, Yuma, and Wray.

In the 2022 Colorado House of Representatives election, Holtorf ran unopposed, winning 100.00% of the total votes cast.

When the Colorado General Assembly convened on January 9, 2023, Holtorf finished his term in the former district 64 and begin his term in the new district 63.

On November 9, 2023, Holtorf announced his candidacy for the Republican nomination to represent Colorado's 4th congressional district in the 2024 United States House of Representatives elections in Colorado. In response to Senate Bill 23-82, a bill which would create a housing voucher and case management program for foster youth, Holtorf in his vote against the measure stated: "Colorado needs to grow up. It's time to grow up and be an adult. And that includes the foster kids... Young people need to know, in this life and this country, you need to get after it. You need to go along and figure it out."

This is despite ample evidence presented for the bill that one in three foster kids become homeless within three years.

In 2020, Holtorf sponsored a bill to ban abortion in Colorado after 22 weeks, but the bill did not pass. In 2023, Holtorf labelled some abortion rights supporters as "godless heathens". In the Colorado House in January 2024, Holtorf discussed his past, stating that he had previously gotten a girlfriend pregnant and helped to pay for her abortion, as he "respected her rights and actually gave her money to help her through her important, critical time so she could live her best life". When Holtorf was questioned about this in June 2024, he said that it was not his "choice", describing himself as "a pro-life Catholic" and urging that "everyone should choose life."

In July 2025, Holtorf was elected to serve as vice chair of the Colorado Republican Party.
