= Colorado's 4th congressional district =

U.S. House district for Colorado

Coordinates: 39°04′15″N 103°24′50″W

- Interactive map of district boundaries since January 3, 2023
- Representative: Lauren Boebert; R–Windsor
- Distribution: 72.9% urban; 27.1% rural
- Population (2025): 795,017
- Median household income: $118,904
- Ethnicity: 75.8% White; 13.6% Hispanic; 4.5% Two or more races; 3.5% Asian; 1.7% Black; 0.9% other
- Cook PVI: R+9

Colorado's 4th congressional district is a congressional district in the U.S. state of Colorado. Located in the eastern part of the state, the district encompasses most of the rural Eastern Plains, as well as portions of the Colorado Front Range, including Loveland, Highlands Ranch, Castle Rock, and Parker.

The district is currently represented by Republican Lauren Boebert. With a Cook Partisan Voting Index rating of R+9, it is the most Republican district in Colorado. It is also the wealthiest congressional district in the state of Colorado.

== History ==
=== 1990s ===
Following the 1990 U.S. census and associated realignment of Colorado congressional districts, the 4th congressional district consisted of Baca, Bent, Cheyenne, Crowley, Elbert, Kiowa, Kit Carson, Larimer, Las Animas, Lincoln, Logan, Morgan, Otero, Phillips, Prowers, Sedgwick, Washington, Weld and Yuma counties, as well as portions of Adams and Arapahoe counties.

=== 2000s ===
Following the 2000 U.S. census and associated realignment of Colorado congressional districts, the 4th congressional district consisted of Baca, Bent, Cheyenne, Crowley, Kiowa, Kit Carson, Larimer, Lincoln, Logan, Morgan, Phillips, Prowers, Sedgwick, Washington, Weld and Yuma counties, as well as portions of Boulder, and Otero counties.

=== 2010s ===
Following the 2010 U.S. census and associated realignment of Colorado congressional districts, the 4th congressional district consisted of Baca, Bent, Cheyenne, Crowley, Elbert, Kiowa, Kit Carson, Las Animas, Lincoln, Logan, Morgan, Otero, Phillips, Prowers, Sedgwick, Washington, Weld and Yuma counties. The district also includes portions of Adams, Arapahoe, Boulder and Douglas counties and very little portions of Larimer County.

== Characteristics ==
This district consists mainly of the area of Colorado that is part of the Great Plains region of the United States. It is largely rural. The only large populated places in the district are Loveland, Highlands Ranch, Castle Rock, and Parker. Until the 2010s redistricting, Fort Collins was the largest city in the district and provided a large Democratic base, making the district somewhat competitive: before the 2020 redistricting, Greeley was the largest city in the district but has since been moved to the 8th district.

While the 4th takes in some suburbs of the Democratic-leaning Denver metropolitan area, the 4th takes in Douglas County, the most Republican region in the area. However, it is still far more friendly to the Democrats than the other counties in the district (especially in blue-leaning Highlands Ranch and Lone Tree) and is the only area in the district with any Democratic support of real significance. On the other hand, the district takes in some of the most Republican counties in Colorado, such as Washington, Kit Carson, and Logan, where Democrats rarely exceed even 20 percent of the vote.

Historically, the district has been Republican-leaning, though Marilyn Musgrave won relatively narrow victories in 2004 and 2006 due to her Democratic opponents' strength in Fort Collins. Musgrave had to rely on strong performances in more conservative Greeley to hold onto her seat. In 2008, Musgrave lost reelection to Betsy Markey, who became the first Democrat to represent the district since the early 1970s. Markey was defeated in 2010 by Republican Cory Gardner, and the district was made more Republican in redistricting due to the removal of Fort Collins.

George W. Bush received 58% of the vote in this district in 2004. John McCain narrowly carried the district in 2008 with 50% of the vote.

The current incumbent, Republican Lauren Boebert, was elected to the seat on November 5, 2024, having previously represented Colorado's 3rd Congressional District. Boebert defeated Democratic nominee and former AFL-CIO speechwriter Trisha Calvarese.

== Composition ==
For the 118th and successive Congresses (based on redistricting following the 2020 census), the district contains all or portions of the following counties and communities:

Adams County (3)

Bennett, Strasburg (shared with Arapahoe County), Watkins (shared with Arapahoe County)

Arapahoe County (7)

Brick Center, Byers, Comanche Creek, Deer Trail, Peoria, Strasburg (shared with Adams County), Watkins (shared with Adams County)

Baca County (6)

All 6 communities

Bent County (3)

All 3 communities

Cheyenne County (3)

All 3 communities

Crowley County (4)

All 4 communities

Douglas County (22)

Acres Green, Castle Pines, Castle Pines Village, Castle Rock, Franktown, Grand View Estates, Highlands Ranch, Larkspur, Lone Tree, Louviers, Meridian, Meridian Village, Parker, Perry Park, Roxborough Park, Sedalia, Sierra Ridge, Stepping Stone, Sterling Ranch, Stonegate, The Pinery, Westcreek

Elbert County (6)

All 6 communities

El Paso County (2)

Calhan, Ramah

Kiowa County (5)

All 5 communities

Kit Carson County (6)

All 6 communities

Larimer County (3)

Loveland, Wellington, Windsor (shared with Weld County)

Lincoln County (4)

All 4 communities

Lincoln County (4)

All 4 communities

Logan County (8)

All 8 communities

Morgan County (13)

All 13 communities

Phillips County (4)

All 4 communities

Prowers County (5)

All 5 communities

Sedgwick County (3)

All 3 communities

Washington County (3)

All 3 communities

Weld County (11)

Ault, Briggsdale, Eaton, Grover, Hudson, Keenesburg, Nunn, Pierce, Raymer, Severance, Windsor (shared Larimer County)

== Recent election results from statewide races ==
Year	Office	Results
2008	President	McCain 59% - 39%
2008	Senate	Schaffer 57% - 38%
2010	Senate	Buck 60% - 34%
2010	Secretary of State	Gessler 64% - 28%
2010	Treasurer	Stapleton 65% - 35%
2010	Attorney General	Suthers 71% - 29%
2012	President	Romney 64% - 36%
2014	Senate	Gardner 59% - 36%
2016	President	Trump 60% - 32%
2016	Senate	Glenn 60% - 35%
2018	Governor	Stapleton 60% - 36%
2018	Attorney General	Brauchler 63% - 34%
2020	President	Trump 58% - 39%
2020	Senate	Gardner 61% - 37%
2022	Senate	O'Dea 57% - 40%
2022	Governor	Ganahl 55% - 42%
2022	Secretary of State	Anderson 58% - 39%
2022	Treasurer	Sias 59% - 38%
2022	Attorney General	Kellner 60% - 38%
2024	President	Trump 58% - 40%

== List of members representing the district ==
Member	Party	Term duration	Cong ress(es)	Electoral history	District location
District created March 4, 1915
Edward T. Taylor (Glenwood Springs)	Democratic	March 4, 1915 – September 3, 1941	64th 65th 66th 67th 68th 69th 70th 71st 72nd 73rd 74th 75th 76th 77th	Redistricted from the at-large district and re-elected in 1914. Re-elected in 1916. Re-elected in 1918. Re-elected in 1920. Re-elected in 1922. Re-elected in 1924. Re-elected in 1926. Re-elected in 1928. Re-elected in 1930. Re-elected in 1932. Re-elected in 1934. Re-elected in 1936. Re-elected in 1938. Re-elected in 1940. Died.	
Vacant		September 3, 1941 – December 9, 1941	77th		
Robert F. Rockwell (Paonia)	Republican	December 9, 1941 – January 3, 1949	77th 78th 79th 80th	Elected to finish Taylor's term. Re-elected in 1942. Re-elected in 1944. Re-elected in 1946. Lost re-election.	
Wayne N. Aspinall (Palisade)	Democratic	January 3, 1949 – January 3, 1973	81st 82nd 83rd 84th 85th 86th 87th 88th 89th 90th 91st 92nd	Elected in 1948. Re-elected in 1950. Re-elected in 1952. Re-elected in 1954. Re-elected in 1956. Re-elected in 1958. Re-elected in 1960. Re-elected in 1962. Re-elected in 1964. Re-elected in 1966. Re-elected in 1968. Re-elected in 1970. Lost renomination.	
James Paul Johnson (Fort Collins)	Republican	January 3, 1973 – January 3, 1981	93rd 94th 95th 96th	Elected in 1972. Re-elected in 1974. Re-elected in 1976. Re-elected in 1978. Retired.	
Hank Brown (Greeley)	Republican	January 3, 1981 – January 3, 1991	97th 98th 99th 100th 101st	Elected in 1980. Re-elected in 1982. Re-elected in 1984. Re-elected in 1986. Re-elected in 1988. Retired to run for U.S. Senator.	
Wayne Allard (Loveland)	Republican	January 3, 1991 – January 3, 1997	102nd 103rd 104th	Elected in 1990. Re-elected in 1992. Re-elected in 1994. Retired to run for U.S. Senator.	
Bob Schaffer (Fort Collins)	Republican	January 3, 1997 – January 3, 2003	105th 106th 107th	Elected in 1996. Re-elected in 1998. Re-elected in 2000. Retired.	
Marilyn Musgrave (Fort Morgan)	Republican	January 3, 2003 – January 3, 2009	108th 109th 110th	Elected in 2002. Re-elected in 2004. Re-elected in 2006. Lost re-election.	2003–2013
Betsy Markey (Fort Collins)	Democratic	January 3, 2009 – January 3, 2011	111th	Elected in 2008. Lost re-election.	2003–2013
Cory Gardner (Yuma)	Republican	January 3, 2011 – January 3, 2015	112th 113th	Elected in 2010. Re-elected in 2012. Retired to run for U.S. Senator.	2003–2013
Cory Gardner (Yuma)	Republican	January 3, 2011 – January 3, 2015	112th 113th	Elected in 2010. Re-elected in 2012. Retired to run for U.S. Senator.	2013–2023
Ken Buck (Windsor)	Republican	January 3, 2015 – March 22, 2024	114th 115th 116th 117th 118th	Elected in 2014. Re-elected in 2016. Re-elected in 2018. Re-elected in 2020. Re-elected in 2022. Resigned.	2013–2023
Ken Buck (Windsor)	Republican	January 3, 2015 – March 22, 2024	114th 115th 116th 117th 118th	Elected in 2014. Re-elected in 2016. Re-elected in 2018. Re-elected in 2020. Re-elected in 2022. Resigned.	2023–present
Vacant		March 22, 2024 – July 8, 2024	118th		2023–present
Greg Lopez (Elizabeth)	Republican	July 8, 2024 – January 3, 2025	118th	Elected to finish Buck's term. Retired.	2023–present
Lauren Boebert (Windsor)	Republican	January 3, 2025 – present	119th	Moved from the 3rd district and re-elected in 2024. Lost re-election.	2023–present
Eileen Laubacher (Highlands Ranch)	Democratic	Assuming office on January 3, 2027		Elected in 2026.	2023–present

== Election results ==
=== 1914 ===
1914 United States House of Representatives elections
Party	Candidate	Votes	%
Democratic	Edward T. Taylor (Incumbent)	26,562	57.83
Republican	H. J. Baird	15,015	32.69
Socialist	George Kunkle	4,353	9.48
Total votes		45,930	100.0
Democratic win (new seat)			

=== 1916 ===
1916 United States House of Representatives elections
Party	Candidate	Votes	%
Democratic	Edward T. Taylor (incumbent)	30,926	65.78
Republican	H. J. Baird	13,397	28.49
Socialist	Emery D. Cox	2,695	5.73
Total votes		47,018	100.0
Democratic hold			

=== 1918 ===
1918 United States House of Representatives elections
Party	Candidate	Votes	%
Democratic	Edward T. Taylor (incumbent)	22,423	65.72
Republican	Straud M. Logan	11,695	34.28
Total votes		34,118	100.0
Democratic hold			

=== 1920 ===
1920 United States House of Representatives elections
Party	Candidate	Votes	%
Democratic	Edward T. Taylor (incumbent)	25,994	55.32
Republican	Merle D. Vincent	20,991	44.68
Total votes		46,985	100.0
Democratic hold			

=== 1922 ===
1922 United States House of Representatives elections
Party	Candidate	Votes	%
Democratic	Edward T. Taylor (incumbent)	30,331	64.26
Republican	Merle D. Vincent	16,870	35.74
Total votes		47,201	100.0
Democratic hold			

=== 1924 ===
1924 United States House of Representatives elections
Party	Candidate	Votes	%
Democratic	Edward T. Taylor (incumbent)	33,262	65.54
Republican	Webster S. Whinnery	17,486	34.46
Total votes		50,748	100.0
Democratic hold			

=== 1926 ===
1926 United States House of Representatives elections
Party	Candidate	Votes	%
Democratic	Edward T. Taylor (incumbent)	32,093	66.75
Republican	Webster S. Whinnery	15,990	33.25
Total votes		48,083	100.0
Democratic hold			

=== 1928 ===
1928 United States House of Representatives elections
Party	Candidate	Votes	%
Democratic	Edward T. Taylor (incumbent)	30,142	58.84
Republican	William P. Dale	21,089	41.16
Total votes		51,231	100.0
Democratic hold			

=== 1930 ===
1930 United States House of Representatives elections
Party	Candidate	Votes	%
Democratic	Edward T. Taylor (incumbent)	34,536	66.95
Republican	Webster S. Whinnery	17,051	33.05
Total votes		51,587	100.0
Democratic hold			

=== 1932 ===
1932 United States House of Representatives elections
Party	Candidate	Votes	%
Democratic	Edward T. Taylor (incumbent)	40,736	65.99
Republican	Richard C. Callen	20,993	34.01
Total votes		61,729	100.0
Democratic hold			

=== 1934 ===
1934 United States House of Representatives elections
Party	Candidate	Votes	%
Democratic	Edward T. Taylor (incumbent)	39,747	67.30
Republican	Harry McDevitt	17,234	29.18
Veterans' Party	Gustavis A. Billstrom	1,625	2.75
Independent	O. W. Daggett	457	0.77
Total votes		59,063	100.0
Democratic hold			

=== 1936 ===
1936 United States House of Representatives elections
Party	Candidate	Votes	%
Democratic	Edward T. Taylor (incumbent)	42,010	65.45
Republican	John S. Woody	22,175	34.55
Total votes		64,185	100.0
Democratic hold			

=== 1938 ===
1938 United States House of Representatives elections
Party	Candidate	Votes	%
Democratic	Edward T. Taylor (incumbent)	43,596	63.74
Republican	John S. Woody	24,805	36.26
Total votes		68,401	100.0
Democratic hold			

=== 1940 ===
1940 United States House of Representatives elections
Party	Candidate	Votes	%
Democratic	Edward T. Taylor (incumbent)	44,095	59.41
Republican	Paul W. Crawford	30,126	40.59
Total votes		74,221	100.0
Democratic hold			

=== 1941 (special) ===
1941 Colorado's 4th congressional district special election
Party	Candidate	Votes	%
Republican	Robert F. Rockwell	19,918	54.04
Democratic	Frank Delaney	16,941	45.96
Total votes		36,859	100.0
Republican gain from Democratic			

=== 1942 ===
1942 United States House of Representatives elections
Party	Candidate	Votes	%
Republican	Robert F. Rockwell (incumbent)	28,460	58.75
Democratic	Elizabeth E. Pellet	19,979	41.25
Total votes		48,439	100.0
Republican hold			

=== 1944 ===
1944 United States House of Representatives elections
Party	Candidate	Votes	%
Republican	Robert F. Rockwell (incumbent)	38,671	61.67
Democratic	John L. Heuschkel	24,039	38.33
Total votes		62,710	100.0
Republican hold			

=== 1946 ===
1946 United States House of Representatives elections
Party	Candidate	Votes	%
Republican	Robert F. Rockwell (incumbent)	28,894	58.75
Democratic	Thomas Matthews	20,290	41.25
Total votes		49,184	100.0
Republican hold			

=== 1948 ===
1948 United States House of Representatives elections
Party	Candidate	Votes	%
Democratic	Wayne Aspinall	34,695	51.86
Republican	Robert F. Rockwell (incumbent)	32,206	48.14
Total votes		66,901	100.0
Democratic gain from Republican			

=== 1950 ===
1950 United States House of Representatives elections
Party	Candidate	Votes	%
Democratic	Wayne Aspinall (incumbent)	35,797	57.30
Republican	Jack Evans	26,674	42.70
Total votes		62,471	100.0
Democratic hold			

=== 1952 ===
1952 United States House of Representatives elections
Party	Candidate	Votes	%
Democratic	Wayne Aspinall (incumbent)	39,676	50.02
Republican	Howard M. Shults	39,647	49.98
Total votes		79,323	100.0
Democratic hold			

=== 1954 ===
1954 United States House of Representatives elections
Party	Candidate	Votes	%
Democratic	Wayne Aspinall (incumbent)	34,294	53.49
Republican	Charles E. Wilson	29,818	46.51
Total votes		64,112	100.0
Democratic hold			

=== 1956 ===
1956 United States House of Representatives elections
Party	Candidate	Votes	%
Democratic	Wayne Aspinall (incumbent)	48,489	61.76
Republican	Hugh Caldwell	30,026	38.24
Total votes		78,515	100.0
Democratic hold			

=== 1958 ===
1958 United States House of Representatives elections
Party	Candidate	Votes	%
Democratic	Wayne Aspinall (incumbent)	43,785	63.61
Republican	J. R. "Dick" Wells	25,048	36.39
Total votes		68,833	100.0
Democratic hold			

=== 1960 ===
1960 United States House of Representatives elections
Party	Candidate	Votes	%
Democratic	Wayne Aspinall (incumbent)	58,731	68.54
Republican	Charles P. Casteel	26,960	31.46
Total votes		85,691	100.0
Democratic hold			

=== 1962 ===
1962 United States House of Representatives elections
Party	Candidate	Votes	%
Democratic	Wayne Aspinall (incumbent)	42,462	58.65
Republican	Leo L. Sommerville	29,943	41.35
Total votes		72,405	100.0
Democratic hold			

=== 1964 ===
1964 United States House of Representatives elections
Party	Candidate	Votes	%
Democratic	Wayne Aspinall (incumbent)	106,685	63.02
Republican	Edwin S. Lamm	62,617	36.98
Total votes		169,302	100.0
Democratic hold			

=== 1966 ===
1966 United States House of Representatives elections
Party	Candidate	Votes	%
Democratic	Wayne Aspinall (incumbent)	84,107	58.61
Republican	James Paul Johnson	59,404	41.39
Total votes		143,511	100.0
Democratic hold			

=== 1968 ===
1968 United States House of Representatives elections
Party	Candidate	Votes	%
Democratic	Wayne Aspinall (incumbent)	92,680	54.69
Republican	Fred E. Anderson	76,776	45.31
Total votes		169,456	100.0
Democratic hold			

=== 1970 ===
1970 United States House of Representatives elections
Party	Candidate	Votes	%
Democratic	Wayne Aspinall (incumbent)	76,244	55.08
Republican	Bill Gossard	62,169	44.92
Total votes		138,413	100.0
Democratic hold			

=== 1972 ===
1972 United States House of Representatives elections
Party	Candidate	Votes	%
Republican	James Paul Johnson	94,994	51.03
Democratic	Alan Merson	91,151	48.97
Total votes		186,145	100.0
Republican gain from Democratic			

=== 1974 ===
1974 United States House of Representatives elections
Party	Candidate	Votes	%
Republican	James Paul Johnson (incumbent)	82,982	52.05
Democratic	John Carroll	76,452	47.95
Total votes		159,434	100.0
Republican hold			

=== 1976 ===
1976 United States House of Representatives elections
Party	Candidate	Votes	%
Republican	James Paul Johnson (incumbent)	119,458	54.05
Democratic	Daniel Ogden	76,995	34.84
Independent	Dick Davis	20,398	9.23
Independent	Henry Thiel	4,167	1.89
Total votes		221,018	100.0
Republican hold			

=== 1978 ===
1978 United States House of Representatives elections
Party	Candidate	Votes	%
Republican	James Paul Johnson (incumbent)	103,121	61.18
Democratic	Morgan Smith	65,421	38.82
Total votes		168,542	100.0
Republican hold			

=== 1980 ===
1980 United States House of Representatives elections
Party	Candidate	Votes	%
Republican	Hank Brown	178,221	68.42
Democratic	Polly Baca	76,849	29.50
Libertarian	Cynthia Molson-Smith	5,421	2.08
Total votes		260,491	100.0
Republican hold			

=== 1982 ===
1982 United States House of Representatives elections
Party	Candidate	Votes	%
Republican	Hank Brown (incumbent)	105,550	69.76
Democratic	Charles "Bud" Bishopp	45,750	30.24
Total votes		151,300	100.0
Republican hold			

=== 1984 ===
1984 United States House of Representatives elections
Party	Candidate	Votes	%
Republican	Hank Brown (incumbent)	146,469	71.13
Democratic	Mary Fagan Bates	56,462	27.42
Libertarian	Randy Fitzgerald	2,999	1.45
Total votes		205,930	100.0
Republican hold			

=== 1986 ===
1986 United States House of Representatives elections
Party	Candidate	Votes	%
Republican	Hank Brown (incumbent)	117,089	69.80
Democratic	David Sprague	50,672	30.20
Total votes		167,761	100.0
Republican hold			

=== 1988 ===
1988 United States House of Representatives elections
Party	Candidate	Votes	%
Republican	Hank Brown (incumbent)	156,202	73.08
Democratic	Charles S. Vigil	57,552	26.92
Total votes		213,754	100.0
Republican hold			

=== 1990 ===
1990 United States House of Representatives elections
Party	Candidate	Votes	%
Republican	Wayne Allard	89,285	54.05
Democratic	Richard R. "Dick" Bond	75,901	45.95
Total votes		165,186	100.0
Republican hold			

=== 1992 ===
1992 United States House of Representatives elections
Party	Candidate	Votes	%
Republican	Wayne Allard (incumbent)	139,884	57.84
Democratic	Tom Redder	101,957	42.16
Total votes		241,841	100.0
Republican hold			

=== 1994 ===
1994 United States House of Representatives elections
Party	Candidate	Votes	%
Republican	Wayne Allard (incumbent)	136,251	72.30
Democratic	Cathy Kipp	52,202	27.70
Total votes		188,453	100.0
Republican hold			

=== 1996 ===
1996 United States House of Representatives elections
Party	Candidate	Votes	%
Republican	Bob Schaffer	137,012	56.14
Democratic	Guy Kelley	92,837	38.04
American	Wesley Paul "Wes" McKinley	7,428	3.04
Natural Law	Cynthia Parker	6,790	2.78
Total votes		244,067	100.0
Republican hold			

=== 1998 ===
1998 United States House of Representatives elections
Party	Candidate	Votes	%
Republican	Bob Schaffer (incumbent)	131,318	59.34
Democratic	Susan Kirkpatrick	89,973	40.66
Total votes		221,291	100.0
Republican hold			

=== 2000 ===
2000 United States House of Representatives elections in Colorado
Party	Candidate	Votes	%
Republican	Bob Schaffer (incumbent)	209,078	79.50
Natural Law	Dan Sewell Ward	19,721	7.50
Libertarian	Kordon L. Baker	19,713	7.50
Constitution	Leslie J. Hanks	9,955	3.77
Write-in		4,539	1.73
Total votes		263,006	100.0
Republican hold			

=== 2002 ===
2002 United States House of Representatives elections in Colorado
Party	Candidate	Votes	%
Republican	Marilyn Musgrave	115,359	54.95
Democratic	Stan Matsunaka	87,499	41.68
Libertarian	John Volz	7,097	3.37
Total votes		209,955	100.0
Republican hold			

=== 2004 ===
2004 United States House of Representatives elections in Colorado
Party	Candidate	Votes	%
Republican	Marilyn Musgrave (incumbent)	155,958	51.05
Democratic	Stan Matsunaka	136,812	44.78
Green	Bob Kinsey	12,739	4.17
Total votes		305,509	100.0
Republican hold			

=== 2006 ===
2006 United States House of Representatives elections in Colorado
Party	Candidate	Votes	%
Republican	Marilyn Musgrave (incumbent)	109,732	45.61
Democratic	Angie Paccione	103,748	43.11
Reform	Eric Eidsness	27,133	11.28
Total votes		240,613	100.0
Republican hold			

=== 2008 ===
2008 United States House of Representatives elections in Colorado
Party	Candidate	Votes	%
Democratic	Betsy Markey	187,348	56%
Republican	Marilyn Musgrave (incumbent)	146,030	44%
Total votes		333,378	100%
Democratic gain from Republican			

=== 2010 ===
2010 United States House of Representatives elections in Colorado
Party	Candidate	Votes	%
Republican	Cory Gardner	138,634	52%
Democratic	Betsy Markey (incumbent)	109,249	41%
Constitution	Doug Aden	12,312	5%
No party	Ken "Wasko" Waszkiewicz	3,986	2%
Total votes		264,181	100%
Republican gain from Democratic			

=== 2012 ===
2012 United States House of Representatives elections in Colorado
Party	Candidate	Votes	%
Republican	Cory Gardner (incumbent)	200,006	59%
Democratic	Brandon Shaffer	128,800	37%
Libertarian	Josh Gilliland	10,682	3%
Constitution	Doug Aden	5,848	1%
Total votes		345,336	100%
Republican hold			

=== 2014 ===
2014 United States House of Representatives elections in Colorado
Party	Candidate	Votes	%
Republican	Ken Buck	185,292	65%
Democratic	Vic Meyers	83,727	29%
Libertarian	Jess Loban	9,472	3%
Independent	Grant Doherty	8,016	3%
Total votes		286,507	100%
Republican hold			

=== 2016 ===
2016 United States House of Representatives elections in Colorado
Party	Candidate	Votes	%
Republican	Ken Buck (incumbent)	248,230	63.5%
Democratic	Bob Seay	123,642	31.7%
Libertarian	Bruce Griffith	18,761	4.8%
Total votes		390,633	100%
Republican hold			

=== 2018 ===
2018 United States House of Representatives elections in Colorado
Party	Candidate	Votes	%
Republican	Ken Buck (incumbent)	224,038	60.61%
Democratic	Karen McCormick	145,544	39.38%
Write-in		38	0.01%
Total votes		369,620	100%
Republican hold			

=== 2020 ===
2020 United States House of Representatives elections in Colorado
Party	Candidate	Votes	%
Republican	Ken Buck (incumbent)	285,606	60.1%
Democratic	Ike McCorkle	173,945	36.6%
Libertarian	Bruce Griffith	11,026	2.3%
Unity	Laura Ireland	4,530	1.0%
Total votes		475,107	100%
Republican hold			

=== 2022 ===
2022 United States House of Representatives elections in Colorado
Party	Candidate	Votes	%
Republican	Ken Buck (incumbent)	216,024	60.9%
Democratic	Ike McCorkle	129,619	36.6%
American Constitution	Ryan McGonigal	8,870	2.5%
Total votes		354,513	100%
Republican hold			

=== 2024 (special) ===
2024 Colorado's 4th congressional district special election
Party	Candidate	Votes	%
Republican	Greg Lopez	100,068	58.40%
Democratic	Trisha Calvarese	59,003	34.43%
Libertarian	Hannah Goodman	9,065	5.29%
Approval Voting	Frank Atwood	3,224	1.88%
Total votes		171,360	100.00%
Republican hold			

=== 2024 ===
2024 United States House of Representatives elections in Colorado
Party	Candidate	Votes	%
Republican	Lauren Boebert	240,213	53.6%
Democratic	Trisha Calvarese	188,249	42.0%
Libertarian	Hannah Goodman	11,676	2.6%
Approval Voting	Frank Atwood	6,233	1.4%
Unity	Paul Fiorino	1,436	0.3%
Total votes		447,807	100%
Republican hold			

== Historical district boundaries ==
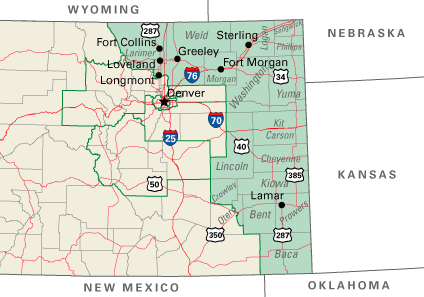
2003–2013

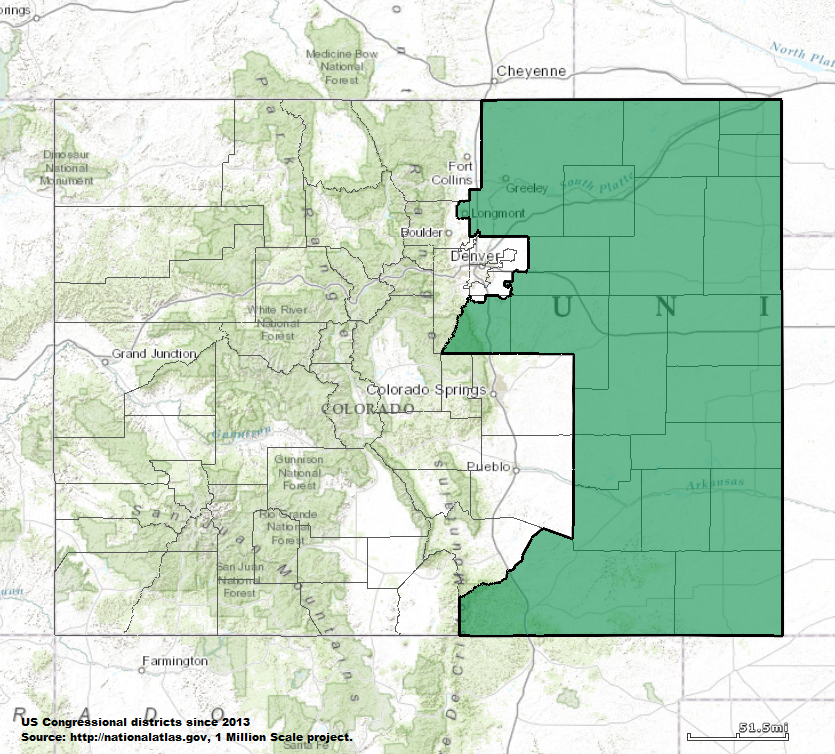
2013–2023

2023–2033

== See also ==
- Colorado's congressional districts
- List of United States congressional districts
