= 2002 United States Senate election in Colorado =

- November 5, 2002
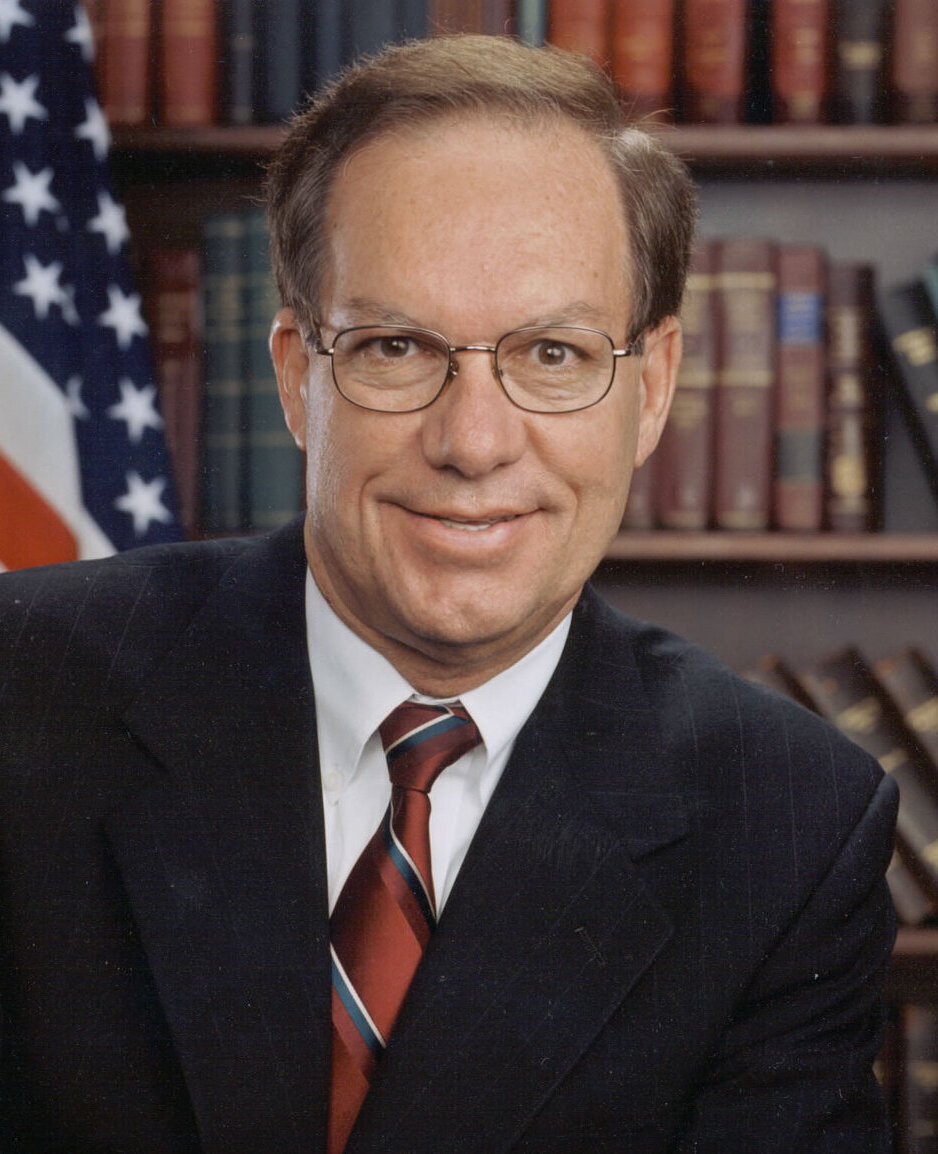

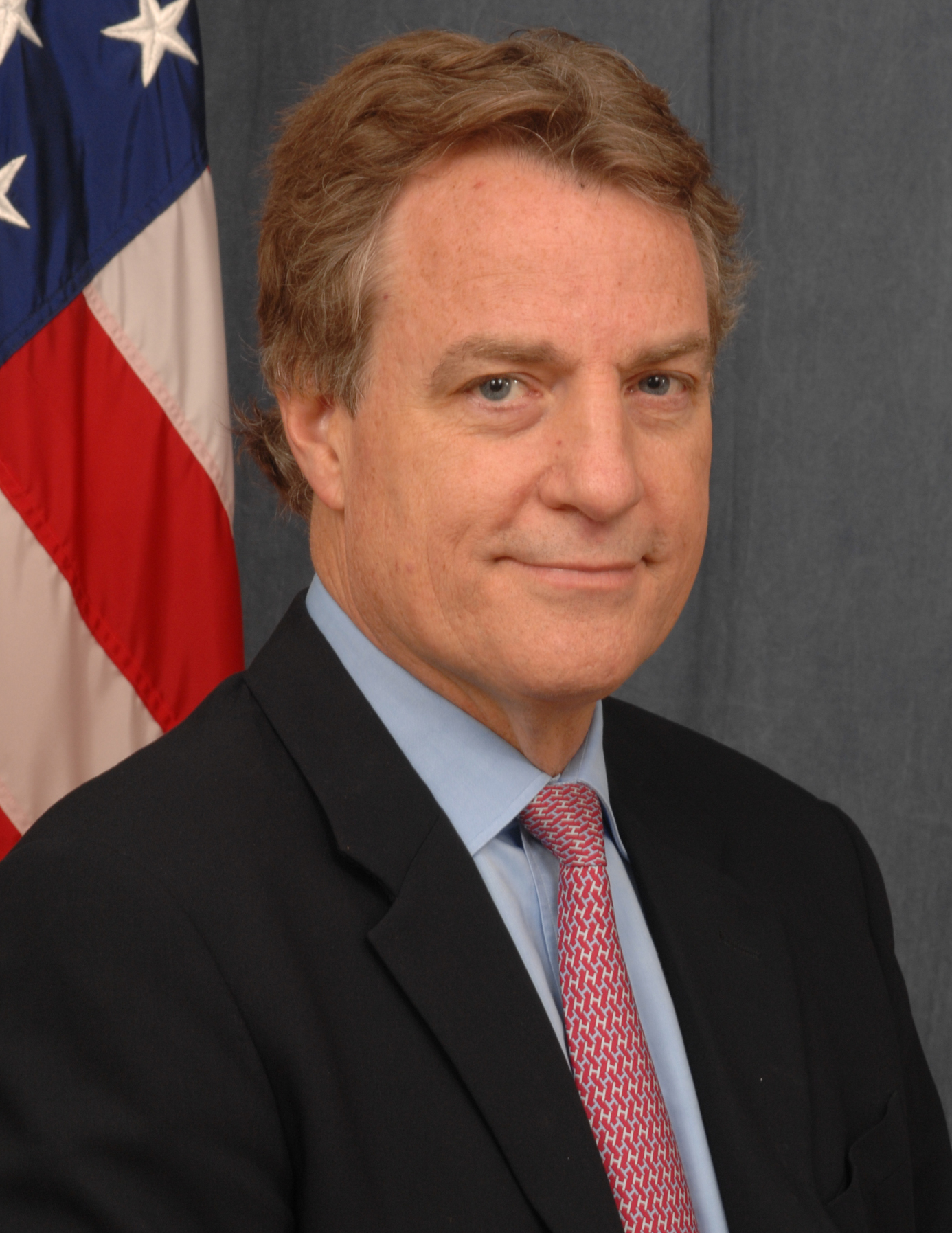
Nominee	Wayne Allard	Tom Strickland
Party	Republican	Democratic
Popular vote	717,893	648,130
Percentage	50.70%	45.77%
- County results Allard: 40–50% 50–60% 60–70% 70–80% Strickland: 40–50% 50–60% 60–70%
U.S. senator before election
Wayne Allard
Republican
Elected U.S. Senator
Wayne Allard
Republican

The 2002 United States Senate election in Colorado was held on November 5, 2002. Incumbent Republican U.S. Senator Wayne Allard won reelection to a second term. This is also the last time the incumbent Senator of this seat won reelection and the most recent time that one political party won this seat in two consecutive elections until 2026.

== Democratic primary ==
=== Candidates ===
- Tom Strickland, former U.S. Attorney for the District of Colorado and Democratic nominee for the U.S. Senate in 1996

=== Results ===
Democratic primary results
Party	Candidate	Votes	%
Democratic	Tom Strickland	110,309	100.00%
Total votes		110,309	100.00%

== Republican primary ==
=== Candidates ===
- Wayne Allard, incumbent U.S. Senator first elected in 1996

=== Results ===
Republican primary results
Party	Candidate	Votes	%
Republican	Wayne Allard (incumbent)	190,250	100.00%
Total votes		190,250	100.00%

== General election ==
=== Candidates ===
- Wayne Allard (R), incumbent U.S. Senator first elected in the 1996 Senate election
- Tom Strickland, former U.S. Attorney for the District of Colorado and Democratic nominee for the U.S. Senate in 1996

=== Debate ===
2002 United States Senate election in Colorado debate
No.	Date	Host	Moderator	Link	Republican	Democratic
Key: P Participant A Absent N Not invited I Invited W Withdrawn						
Key: P Participant A Absent N Not invited I Invited W Withdrawn					Wayne Allard	Tom Strickland
1	Sep. 7, 2002	Club 20; KJCT-TV	Jasper Welsh	C-SPAN	P	P

=== Predictions ===
Source	Ranking	As of
Sabato's Crystal Ball	Lean R	November 4, 2002

=== Polling ===
Poll source	Date(s) administered	Sample size (Note: Key: A – all adults RV – registered voters LV – likely voters V – unclear)	Margin of error	Wayne Allard (R)	Tom Strickland (D)	Other / Undecided
SurveyUSA	October 31 – November 2, 2002	739 (LV)	± 3.7%	50%	46%	4%

=== Results ===
General election results
Party	Candidate	Votes	%	±%
Republican	Wayne Allard (incumbent)	717,899	50.70%	−0.71%
Democratic	Tom Strickland	648,130	45.77%	+0.03%
Constitution	Douglas Campbell	21,547	1.52%	n/a
Libertarian	Rick Stanley	20,776	1.47%	n/a
Independent	John Heckman	7,140	0.50%	n/a
Write-in		596	0.04%	n/a
Majority		69,763	4.93%	−0.74%
Turnout		1,416,082	100.00%	
Republican hold				

==== Counties that flipped from Republican to Democratic ====
- Routt (Largest city: Steamboat Springs)
- Clear Creek (largest city: Idaho Springs)
- La Plata (largest municipality: Durango)
- Saguache (largest city: Center)

==== Counties that flipped from Democratic to Republican ====
- Conejos (largest municipality: Manassa)

== See also ==
- 2002 United States Senate election
