= Cory Gardner =

American politician and attorney (born 1974)

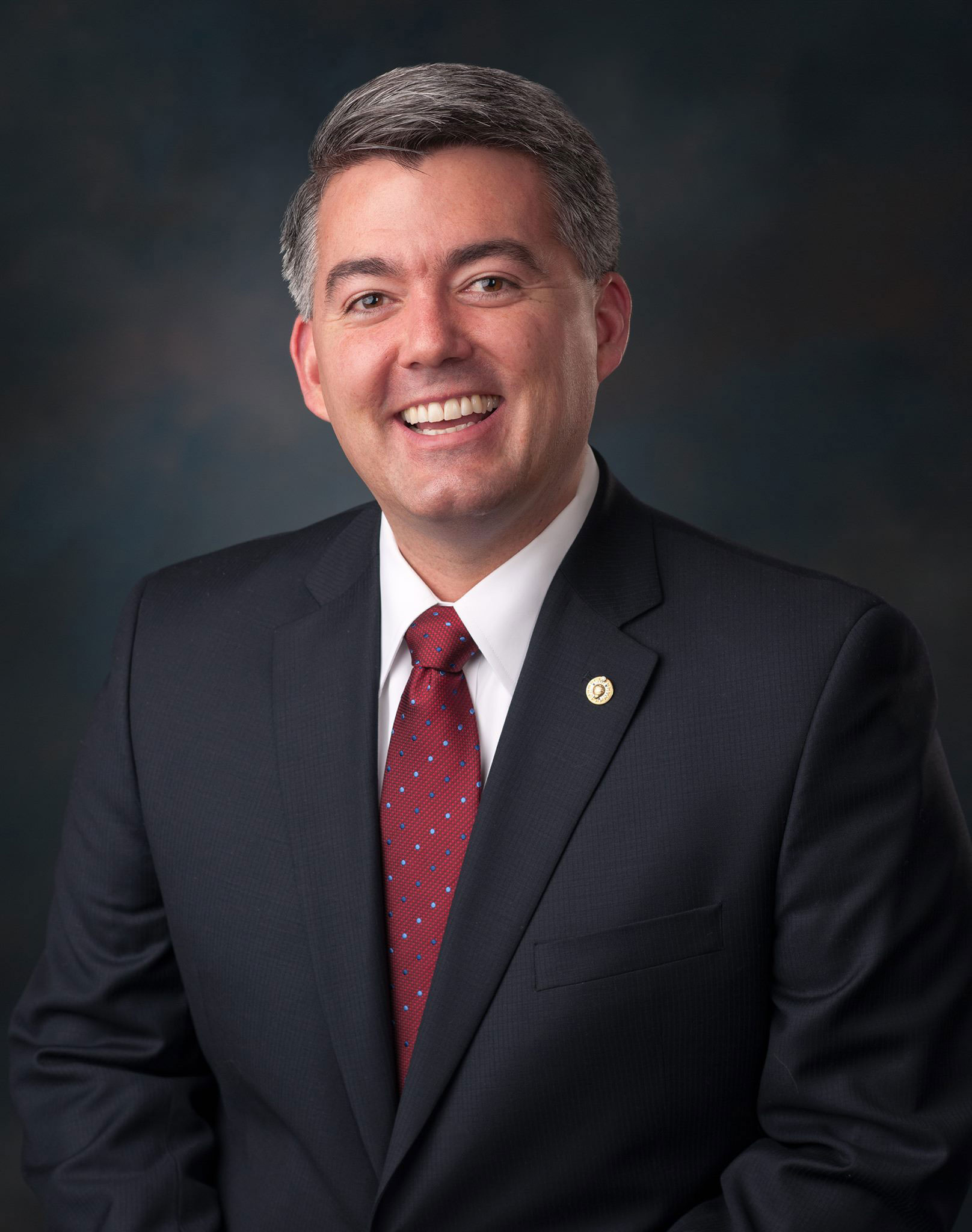
- Official portrait, 2015

United States Senator from Colorado
- In office January 3, 2015 – January 3, 2021
- Preceded by: Mark Udall
- Succeeded by: John Hickenlooper

Chair of the National Republican Senatorial Committee
- In office January 3, 2017 – January 3, 2019
- Leader: Mitch McConnell
- Preceded by: Roger Wicker
- Succeeded by: Todd Young

Member of the U.S. House of Representatives from Colorado's 4th district
- In office January 3, 2011 – January 3, 2015
- Preceded by: Betsy Markey
- Succeeded by: Ken Buck

Member of the Colorado House of Representatives from the 63rd district
- In office June 23, 2005 – January 2, 2011
- Preceded by: Greg Brophy
- Succeeded by: Jon Becker

Personal details
- Born: Cory Scott Gardner; August 22, 1974 (age 52) Yuma, Colorado, U.S.
- Party: Republican
- Spouse: Jaime Gardner
- Children: 3
- Education: Colorado State University (BA); University of Colorado, Boulder (JD)
- Gardner's voice Gardner on the FY2021 National Defense Authorization Act. Recorded July 30, 2020

Cory Scott Gardner (born August 22, 1974) is an American attorney and politician who served as a United States senator from Colorado from 2015 to 2021. A Republican, he was the U.S. representative for Colorado's 4th congressional district from 2011 to 2015 and a member of the Colorado House of Representatives from 2005 to 2011. As of 2026, he is the last Republican to serve Colorado in the U.S. Senate.

Gardner narrowly defeated Democratic incumbent Mark Udall in the 2014 Senate race. Gardner was chair of the National Republican Senatorial Committee from 2017 to 2019. After the 2018 midterm elections, he and University of Colorado Regent Heidi Ganahl became the only Republicans to hold statewide elected office in Colorado. Gardner ran for re-election in 2020, but lost to former Governor John Hickenlooper.

He currently serves as president of NCTA - The Internet and Television Association, the trade group representing cable companies.

== Early life and education ==
Gardner was born on August 22, 1974, in Yuma, Colorado, the son of Cindy L. (née Pagel) and John W. Gardner. He is of Irish, German, Austrian, and English descent. He graduated summa cum laude with a Bachelor of Arts in political science in 1997 from Colorado State University, where he was a member of the FarmHouse fraternity.

In college, Gardner switched from the Democratic Party to the Republican Party and interned at the Colorado State Capitol. He went to law school at the University of Colorado to earn his Juris Doctor in 2001.

== Early career ==
Prior to public office, Gardner worked at his family's implement business and served as spokesman for the National Corn Growers Association. Gardner later served as general counsel and legislative director for former U.S. Senator Wayne Allard of Colorado from 2002 to 2005.

=== Colorado House of Representatives (2005-2011) ===
==== Elections ====
Gardner was appointed to the Colorado House of Representatives in 2005 and elected to a full term in 2006. He represented District 63 in the Colorado House of Representatives from 2005 through 2011.

==== Tenure ====
In 2006, Gardner proposed legislation to create a rainy-day fund to help protect the state from future economic downturns. His proposal relied on money made available by Referendum C—which allowed state revenue caps to be exceeded for five years—for future budget emergencies. He staunchly opposed any tax increases. He helped create the Colorado Clean Energy Development Authority which issued bonds to finance projects that involve the production, transportation and storage of clean energy until it was repealed in 2012.

Committee assignments

- House Education Committee
- House Agriculture and Natural Resources Committee
- Legislative Council

== U.S. House of Representatives (2011-2015) ==
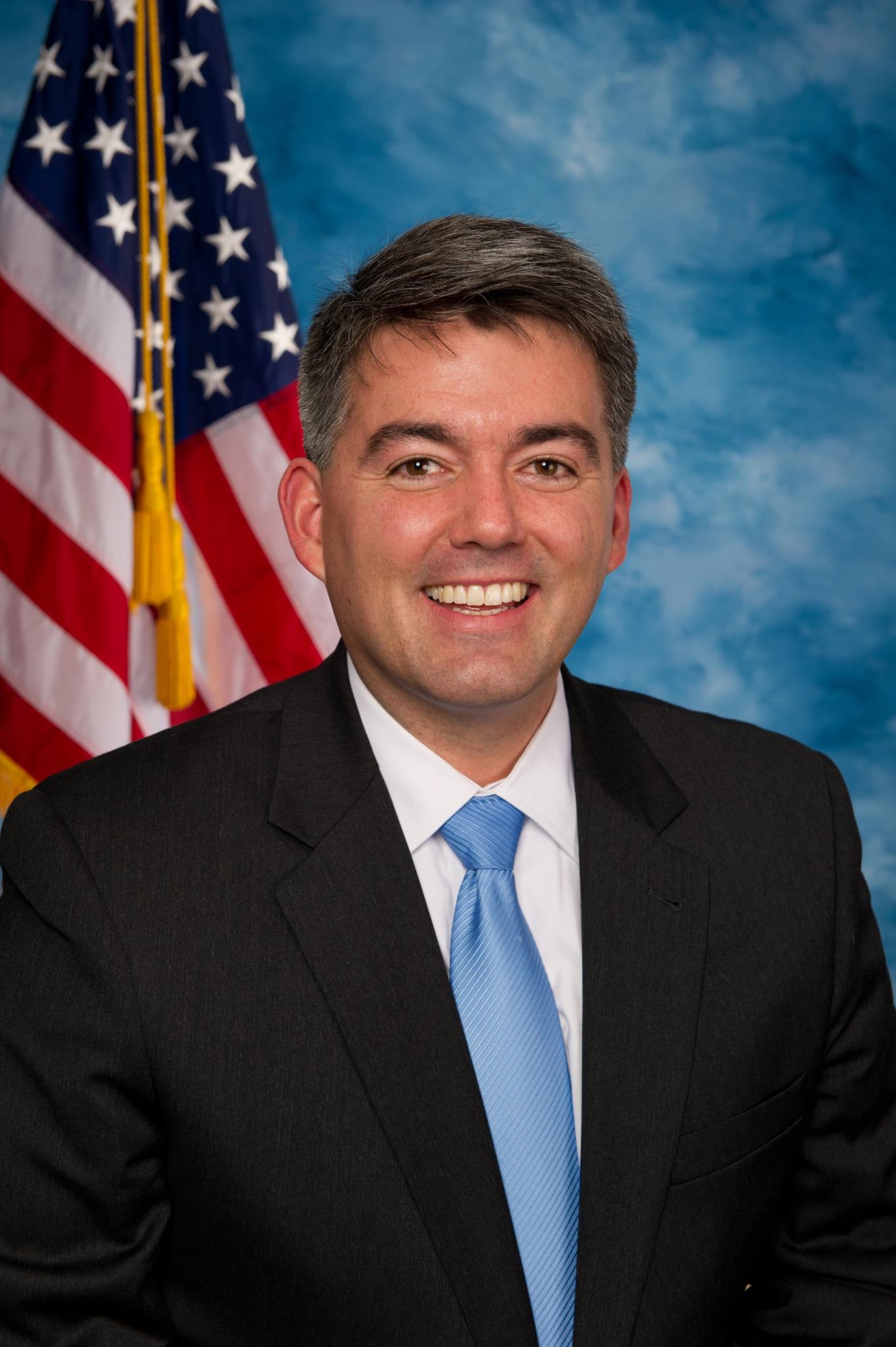
Gardner during the 112th Congress

=== Elections ===
==== 2010 ====
Gardner won the Republican primary in the 4th Congressional District to challenge Democratic incumbent Betsy Markey. Also running were American Constitution Party nominee Doug Aden and Independent Ken "Wasko" Waszkiewicz. In an early September poll, Gardner was up 50% to 39% over Markey. Gardner was endorsed by former U.S. Congressman Tom Tancredo. On November 2, 2010, Gardner defeated Markey, 52%–41%.

==== 2012 ====
Gardner ran unopposed in the Republican primary before defeating Democratic nominee Brandon Shaffer 59%–37% in the general election. He was helped by the 2010 redistricting, which cut Fort Collins and Larimer County out of the district. Fort Collins had long been the 4th's largest city. For years, Larimer and the district's second-largest county, Weld County, home to Greeley, accounted for 85 percent of the district's population even though they only took up 15 percent of its land.

== U.S. Senate (2015-2021) ==
=== Elections ===
==== 2014 ====
Gardner was the Republican nominee for Senate, and narrowly defeated incumbent Senator Mark Udall in the general election receiving 965,974 (48%) votes to Udall's 916,245 (46%). No Labels performed independent get-out-the-vote efforts on behalf of its Problem Solvers, including Gardner.

==== 2020 ====
Gardner ran for reelection in 2020. During his tenure as a Senator, he notably did not hold many public town halls. At a February 2017 public town hall at Denver’s Byers Middle School, Gardner was represented instead by a cardboard cutout, dubbed "Cardboard Cory", created by Katie Farnan and friends. The concept developed staying power, and become an iconic four year protest campaign, showing up at protests and events around the state. Liberal groups including ProgressNow and Indivisible Colorado launched a 14-stop, statewide bus tour featuring Cardboard Cory and Coloradan constituents including Laura Packard during summer 2019. A short documentary film by Nick Rosen of Sender Films about Cardboard Cory's journey sponsored by Indivisible was released July 28, 2020. One of the Cardboard Cory cutouts was eventually given to Senator John Hickenlooper after his defeat of Gardner. According to The Colorado Sun, Gardner "decisively tied his reelection bid to President Donald Trump." He lost to the Democratic nominee, former governor John Hickenlooper by 301,622 votes.

=== Committees and caucuses ===
==== Committee assignments ====
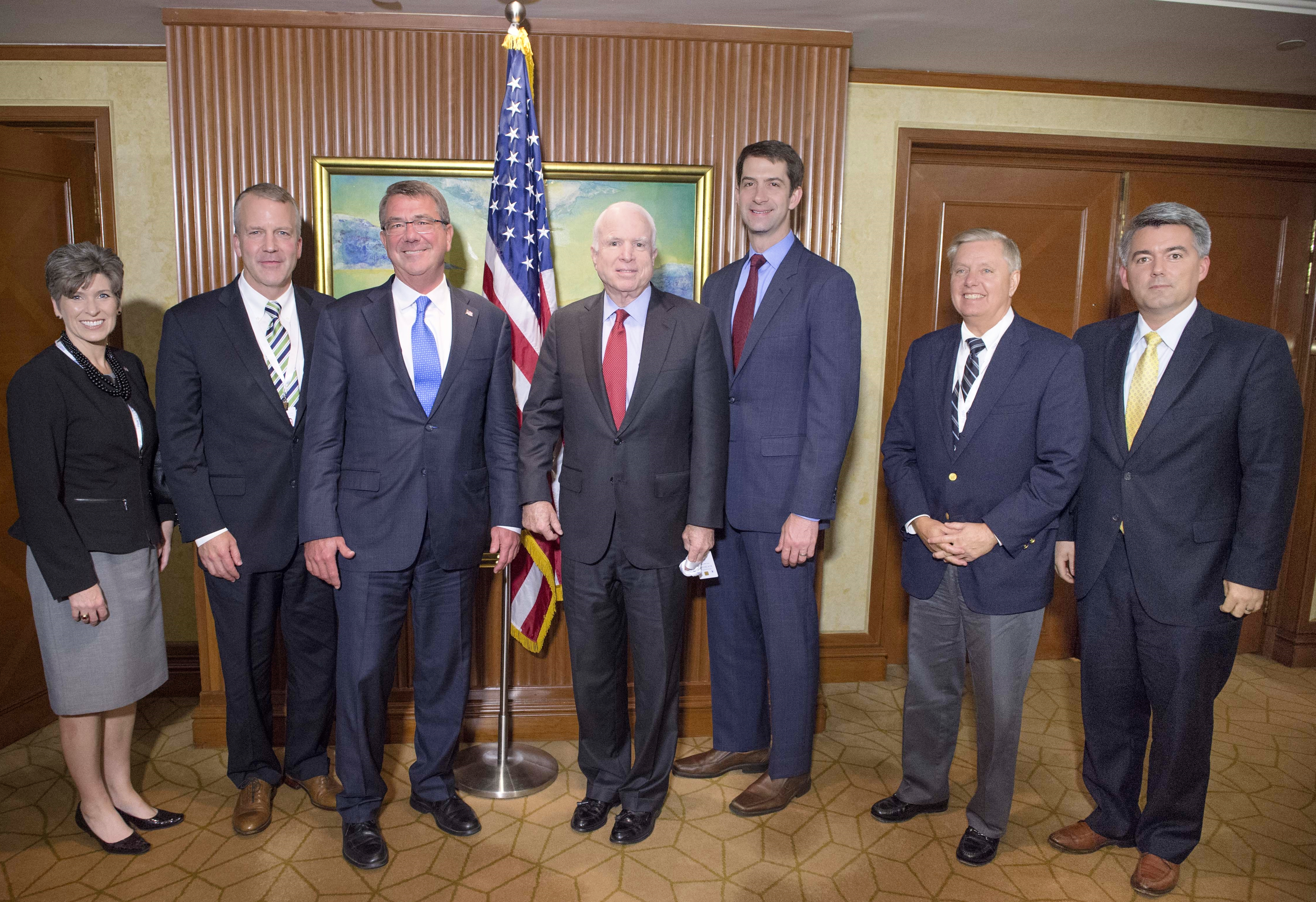
U.S. Secretary of Defense Ash Carter and Senators Joni Ernst, Daniel Sullivan, John McCain, Tom Cotton, Lindsey Graham, and Cory Gardner attending the 2016 International Institute for Strategic Studies Asia Security Summit in Singapore

- Committee on Commerce, Science, and Transportation
  - Subcommittee on Aviation Operations, Safety, and Security
  - Subcommittee on Communications, Technology, and the Internet
  - Subcommittee on Consumer Protection, Product Safety, and Insurance
  - Subcommittee on Science and Space
- Committee on Energy and Natural Resources
  - Subcommittee on Energy (Chairman)
  - Subcommittee on Public Lands, Forests and Mining
  - Subcommittee on Water and Power
- Committee on Foreign Relations
  - Subcommittee on Western Hemisphere, Transnational Crime, Civilian Security, Democracy, Human Rights and Global Women's Issues
  - Subcommittee on Europe and Regional Security Cooperation
  - Subcommittee on East Asia, The Pacific and International Cybersecurity Policy (Chairman)
  - Subcommittee on International Development, Multilateral Institutions and International Economic, Energy and Environmental Policy

==== Caucus memberships ====
- Congressional NextGen 9-1-1 Caucus

== Political positions ==
In March 2019, Gardner was ranked the 5th most bipartisan senator of the 115th Congress by The Lugar Center and Georgetown's McCourt School of Public Policy, and was also ranked the 4th most bipartisan senator of the 116th Congress in May 2021. GovTrack noted that of the 157 bills Gardner cosponsored in 2017, 41% were introduced by legislators who were not Republican.

=== Abortion ===
Gardner identifies as pro-life and opposes legal abortions in most circumstances. He has also stated that he believes that abortion laws should be left up to the states. In 2006, Gardner opposed legislation that would allow pharmacists to prescribe emergency contraception and proposed an amendment to the Colorado state budget to prohibit the state Medicaid plan from purchasing Plan B emergency contraception. In 2007, he voted against a bill that would require hospitals to inform survivors of a sexual assault of the availability of emergency contraception.

In 2012, Gardner co-sponsored the controversial so-called "personhood" legislation titled the Life Begins at Conception Act. Gardner later said that he changed his mind on personhood after listening to voters. According to The Denver Post, "Gardner conceded that with his new position on personhood, he might be accused of flip-flopping simply to make himself more palatable to statewide voters." The nonpartisan Factcheck.org said "It would be clearer to say that Gardner supports efforts to ban abortion that could also ban some forms of birth control. As for his change of position, voters in Colorado should know Gardner still supports a federal bill that would prompt the same concerns over birth control as the state measure he says he rejects on the same grounds." In 2014, Gardner called for over-the-counter access to oral contraceptives and said the birth control pill would be safer and cheaper if it was available over the counter.

=== Donald Trump ===
In the 2016 presidential election, Gardner initially endorsed Donald Trump. In October, however, after the release of the Access Hollywood tape, Gardner said he would not vote for him, whom he called "a candidate whose flaws are beyond mere moral shortcomings and who shows a disgust for American character and a disdain for dignity unbecoming of the Presidency. I cannot and will not support someone who brags about degrading and assaulting women." Nevertheless, in the 2020 presidential election, Gardner endorsed Trump. Gardner voted with Trump 89% of the time during Trump's tenure as president. Gardner tied his 2020 reelection bid to the president. Trump's role was seen as posing a dilemma for Gardner; distancing himself from Trump risked angering some Republican voters and donors, but Trump was very unpopular with Democrats and independents. A Gardner advertisement on Facebook touting his close relationship with Trump did not run in the state.

In 2017, Gardner criticized Trump's response to the Unite the Right rally, writing, "Mr. President—we must call evil by its name. These were white supremacists and this was domestic terrorism." He also differed with Trump on some trade and foreign policy issues. In January 2018, he signed a letter urging the president to preserve and modernize the North American Free Trade Agreement. In March 2018, he criticized Trump for imposing a 10% tariff on aluminum imports and a 25% tariff on steel imports, arguing that they would lead to a trade war that would threaten the American economy, particularly agriculture. "I am concerned that a tariff can result in a tax on the very same people that we are trying to help in this economy," he said. In June 2019 Gardner again expressed concern over Trump's threats to impose tariffs on goods entering the United States from overseas. He argued that such tariffs would result in "a 1.1% tax increase for the lowest 20% of income earners; a 0.3% increase for those in the middle; and a zero net change for the upper middle class." Gardner said that by implementing harsh tariff policies America would be "turning [its] backs on American workers and consumers."

In January 2019, Gardner was one of 11 Republican senators to vote to advance legislation intended to prevent Trump from lifting sanctions against three Russian companies. In January 2019, following a report that Trump had expressed interest in withdrawing from NATO several times during the previous year, Gardner was one of eight senators to reintroduce legislation to prevent Trump from withdrawing the United States from NATO by imposing a requirement of a two-thirds approval from the Senate for a president to suspend, terminate or withdraw American involvement with it. Gardner criticized Trump for perceived softness in dealing with North Korea. "The president has, I'm afraid, taken pressure off of North Korea. He believes it's a way for him to negotiate with Kim Jong Un. I believe it's a rope-a-dope." In April 2019, Gardner was one of 12 senators to sign a bipartisan letter to top senators on the Appropriations Subcommittee on Energy and Water Development advocating that the Energy Department be granted maximum funding for carbon capture, utilization and storage (CCUS), arguing that American job growth could be stimulated by investment in capturing carbon emissions and expressing disagreement with Trump's 2020 budget request to combine the two federal programs that do carbon capture research.

=== Economic policy ===
Gardner signed the Americans for Tax Reform's Taxpayer Protection Pledge. He supports legislation to require that the Federal Reserve be audited. In July 2014, Gardner introduced legislation to reform the Earned Income Tax Credit program. The legislation seeks to reduce fraud in the program and dedicate the savings to increasing the credit for working families.

=== Education ===
In February 2019, Gardner was one of 20 senators to sponsor the Employer Participation in Repayment Act, enabling employers to contribute up to $5,250 to the student loans of their employees.

=== Energy and environment ===
Gardner has acknowledged the existence of climate change while downplaying the contribution of human activity. He has repeatedly voted against measures to reduce or regulate greenhouse gas emissions, including the Clean Power Plan, and has received over $1 million in donations from the oil and gas industry. He holds an 11% lifetime score from the League of Conservation Voters. Gardner supports construction of the Keystone Pipeline and is pro-fracking.

Shortly after taking office in the House of Representatives, Gardner passed legislation to speed up clean-air permits for companies engaged in offshore drilling in Alaska, saying it would create jobs and reduce dependence on foreign oil. In 2013, he introduced a bill to allow the Environmental Protection Agency (EPA) to review solid waste regulations at its discretion, rather than automatically every three years. It would also grant precedence to state requirements for solid waste disposal when creating new federal requirements.

In 2018, Gardner and Senator Michael Bennet introduced bills requiring the U.S. Energy Department to identify vulnerabilities to cyberattacks in the nation's electrical power grid and assigning $90 million to be distributed to states to develop energy security plans. In 2020, Gardner introduced the bipartisan Great American Outdoors Act, which passed with 58 co-sponsors, providing full and permanent funding of $900 million a year for the Land and Water Conservation Fund to aid national parks and public lands.

=== Foreign policy ===
In September 2016, Gardner was one of 34 senators to sign a letter to Secretary of State John Kerry advocating that the United States clearly enforce "a legally binding Security Council Resolution" by using "all available tools to dissuade Russia from continuing its airstrikes in Syria that are clearly not in our interest". In September 2017, Gardner co-sponsored the Israel Anti-Boycott Act (S.270), which made it a federal crime, punishable by a maximum sentence of 20 years imprisonment, for Americans to encourage or participate in boycotts against Israel and Israeli settlements in the occupied Palestinian territories if protesting actions by the Israeli government. In April 2018, Gardner was one of eight Republican senators to sign a letter to Treasury Secretary Steve Mnuchin and acting Secretary of State John Sullivan expressing "deep concern" over a United Nations report that exposed "North Korean sanctions evasion involving Russia and China", saying that the findings "demonstrate an elaborate and alarming military-venture between rogue, tyrannical states to avoid United States and international sanctions and inflict terror and death upon thousands of innocent people", and calling it "imperative that the United States provides a swift and appropriate response to the continued use of chemical weapons used by President Assad and his forces, and works to address the shortcomings in sanctions enforcement."

In September 2018, Gardner was one of five senators to sign a letter to Secretary of State Mike Pompeo urging him to employ more multifactor authentication measures to secure the State Department's information systems and seeking answers on how the department would boost its security following the Office of Management and Budget's designation of the department's cyber-readiness as "high risk", what the department would do to address the lack of multifactor authentication required by law, and statistics on the department's cyber incidents over the last three years. In December 2018, Gardner voted against ending U.S. military support to the Saudi Arabian-led coalition in the Yemen war. He said that Saudi Arabia "is a country in a critical part of the region that has played a key role in our work protecting Israel." In March 2019, Gardner voted against the resolution again, saying it would have empowered Iran. In January 2019, Gardner joined Senators Marco Rubio, Jim Risch, and Senate Majority Leader Mitch McConnell in introducing legislation that would impose sanctions on the government of President of Syria Bashar al-Assad and bolster American cooperation with Israel and Jordan.

=== Gun policy ===
Gardner has said that he opposes gun control and that action to prevent gun violence cannot violate constitutional protections. In 2016, Gardner voted against the Feinstein Amendment, which sought to ban gun sales to anyone who had been placed on the terrorist watch list for the last five years. He also opposed an amendment making it necessary for background checks to take place for guns bought at gun shows and online.

=== Health care ===
Gardner opposes the Affordable Care Act and has voted to repeal it. Gardner was among 13 Republican senators drafting the Senate version of the American Health Care Act, which would have repealed and replaced the Affordable Care Act. He voted for all variations of AHCA that came up for a vote in the Senate. The New York Times reported that in September 2017, when the GOP made another attempt to pass legislation to repeal the Affordable Care Act, Gardner warned Republican legislators at a closed luncheon that failure to pass any repeal legislation would lead to a backlash by big donors to Republicans, as well as the grassroots. In January 2019, Gardner was among six senators to cosponsor the Health Insurance Tax Relief Act, delaying the Health Insurance Tax for two years. In 2011, Gardner voted for the Respect for Rights of Conscience Act, which states that "nothing in the Affordable Care Act shall be construed to authorize a health plan to require a provider to provide, participate in, or refer for a specific item or service contrary to the provider's religious beliefs or moral convictions."

Gardner voted for the 2012 Ryan budget plan which would have begun the process of privatizing Medicare. In October 2019, Gardner was among 27 senators to sign a letter to Senate Majority Leader Mitch McConnell and Senate Minority Leader Chuck Schumer advocating the passage of the Community Health Investment, Modernization, and Excellence (CHIME) Act, which was set to expire the following month. The senators warned that if the funding for the Community Health Center Fund (CHCF) was allowed to expire, it "would cause an estimated 2,400 site closures, 47,000 lost jobs, and threaten the health care of approximately 9 million Americans." In 2013, Gardner announced that he would introduce a bill to prohibit executives of state healthcare exchanges from getting bonuses.

=== Immigration ===
In 2019, Gardner was described by Politico as "reliably conservative on most issues other than immigration." Gardner is typically moderate on immigration policy; in 2019 the National Immigration Forum, an immigrant advocacy group, honored him and Senator Dick Durbin for their bipartisan immigration work. In August 2014, Gardner voted against a bill that would have dismantled the Deferred Action for Childhood Arrivals. He has said that he supports immigration reform in the form of a guest worker program and increased border security. Gardner criticized Trump's 2017 executive order to impose a ban on travel to the U.S. by citizens of seven Muslim-majority countries, saying: "While I am supportive of strengthening our screening processes and securing our borders, a blanket travel ban goes too far. I also believe that lawful residents of the United States should be permitted to enter the country. I urge the Administration to take the appropriate steps to fix this overly broad executive order."

In June 2018, Gardner was among 13 Republican senators to sign a letter to Attorney General Jeff Sessions requesting a moratorium on the Trump administration family separation policy while Congress drafted legislation. In March 2019, Gardner voted for Trump's national emergency declaration on the creation of a southern border wall (which allows Trump to take funding from other government functions in order to spend them on a border wall). Majorities in both the House of Representatives and the Senate (where 12 Republican senators joined with Democrats) voted to overturn Trump's national emergency declaration. The Denver Post rescinded its 2014 endorsement of Gardner, citing his vote on Trump's national emergency declaration.

=== Internet and technology ===
Gardner opposes net neutrality, calling the regulations "brazen abuse of power and overreach." On May 16, 2018, he voted against The Congressional Review Act, a bill to reinstate net neutrality. In March 2017, Gardner voted for the Broadband Consumer Privacy Proposal, which repealed the FCC's internet privacy rules and allowed internet service providers to sell customers' browsing history without their permission. In May 2020, Gardner voted for an amendment co-sponsored by Senators Steve Daines and Ron Wyden that would have required federal intelligence and law enforcement agencies to obtain federal court warrants when collecting web search engine data from American citizens, nationals, or residents under the Foreign Intelligence Surveillance Act (FISA).

=== LGBTQ policy ===
Gardner opposes same-sex marriage. In response to the June 2015 U.S. Supreme Court decision enshrining a constitutional right to marriage, Gardner reaffirmed his position that marriage should only be between a man and a woman, but conceded "this issue is in the hands of the courts and we must honor their legal decisions." In 2007, then a state representative, Gardner voted against legislation to allow Colorado gay and lesbian couples to adopt children. In 2012, Gardner voted to renew the Violence Against Women Act of 1994 (VAWA), which reauthorized the bill and expanded protections for Native Americans, immigrants, and gays and lesbians. In 2015, Gardner voted against giving same-sex partners access to the Social Security and veterans benefits earned by their spouses.

=== Judiciary ===
After the death of Supreme Court Justice Ruth Bader Ginsburg in September 2020, Gardner said he would vote to confirm a "qualified" nominee to replace her. He did not say whether he supported holding a confirmation vote before the November presidential election. In 2016, after the death of Justice Antonin Scalia, Gardner said the Senate should delay confirming justices so close to a presidential election.

=== Marijuana policy ===
In 2012, Gardner opposed Colorado Amendment 64, which legalized recreational marijuana. Since that time, he has come to support legalizing marijuana. In 2019, Playboy called him "the potential cannabis power broker in this Congress." In January 2018, Gardner criticized Attorney General Jeff Sessions for announcing a crackdown on marijuana dispensaries around the country, which he said was contrary to what Sessions had told him during his confirmation hearing. In response, Gardner placed a temporary hold on some of Trump's judicial nominees. In 2020, Politico described Gardner as "a champion of the cannabis industry" and "the GOP's most ardent promoter of cannabis in Congress." He has sponsored a bill that would increase the marijuana industry's access to banking and capital and another that would codify federal protections for states that have legalized marijuana.

=== Mental health ===
In 2019, Gardner introduced the National Suicide Hotline Designation Act, which creates a new nationwide three-digit phone number (988) to connect to a suicide prevention hotline. In addition to funding the new number, the bill requires a strategy report for suicide prevention services for LGBTQ youth, minorities, and rural individuals, among other high-risk groups. The bill unanimously passed the U.S. Senate and was signed into law by Trump in October 2020.

== Post-congressional career ==
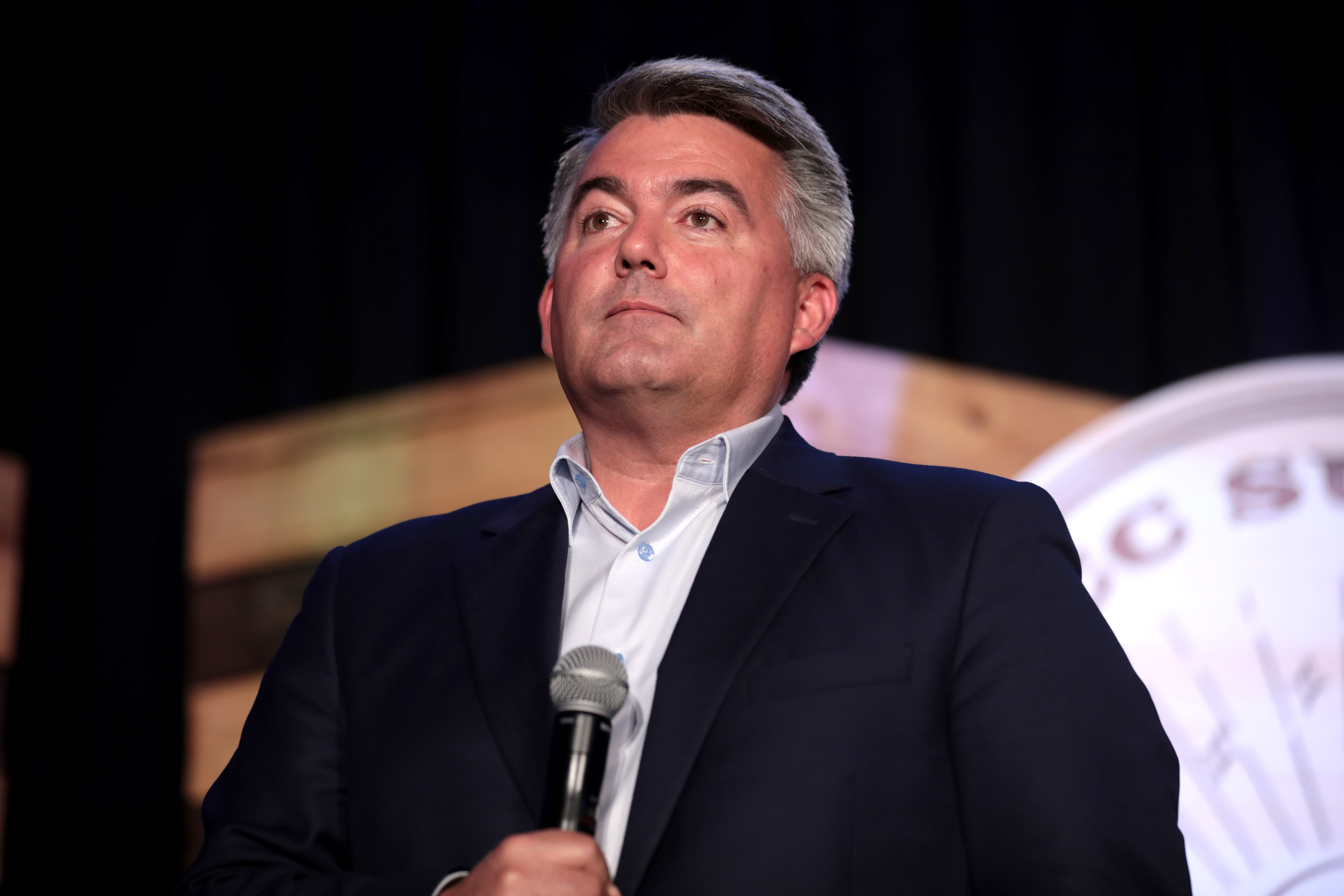
Gardner speaking with attendees at the American Conservation Coalition's 2023 Summit in Salt Lake City

After leaving the Senate, Gardner was considered a potential candidate for governor of Colorado or in the 2022 Colorado Senate race against his former colleague, Michael Bennet, though he ultimately opted not to run. In February 2021, Gardner became the chair of the National Action Victory Fund, a PAC that raises money for Republican candidates. In June 2021, five months after leaving office, he joined the board of advisers of Michael Best Strategies, a national lobbying firm. In April 2022, he joined a trade association, the Crypto Council for Innovation as its chief political affairs strategist. In February 2023, Gardner was hired to co-chair a super PAC alongside longtime GOP operative Rob Collins by South Carolina Senator Tim Scott, which would later support his run for President in the 2024 United States presidential election.

Since September 2025, he has served as president & CEO of NCTA - The Internet and Television Association, the trade group representing cable companies.

== Electoral history ==
Colorado District 63 election, 2006
Party	Candidate	Votes	%	±%
Republican	Cory Gardner	15,736	73%	−1%
Democratic	Pauline Artery	5,732	27%	+1%

Colorado District 63 election, 2008
Party	Candidate	Votes	%	±%
Republican	Cory Gardner (incumbent)	22,847	100%	+27%

Colorado's 4th congressional district election, 2010
Party	Candidate	Votes	%
Republican	Cory Gardner	138,634	52.48
Democratic	Betsy Markey (incumbent)	109,249	41.35
Constitution	Doug Aden	12,312	4.66
Independent	Ken Waskiewicz	3,986	1.51
Total votes		264,181	100.00
Republican gain from Democratic			

Colorado's 4th congressional district, 2012
Party	Candidate	Votes	%
Republican	Cory Gardner (incumbent)	200,006	58.4
Democratic	Brandon Shaffer	125,800	36.8
Libertarian	Josh Gilliland	10,682	3.1
Constitution	Doug Aden	5,848	1.7
Total votes		342,336	100.0
Republican hold			

United States Senate election in Colorado, 2014
Party	Candidate	Votes	%
Republican	Cory Gardner	983,891	48.21%
Democratic	Mark Udall (incumbent)	944,203	46.26%
Libertarian	Gaylon Kent	52,876	2.59%
Independent	Steve Shogan	29,472	1.44%
Independent	Raúl Acosta	24,151	1.18%
Unity	Bill Hammons	6,427	0.32%
Total votes		2,041,020	100.0%
Republican gain from Democratic			

United States Senate election in Colorado, 2020
Party	Candidate	Votes	%
Democratic	John Hickenlooper	1,730,722	53.5%
Republican	Cory Gardner (incumbent)	1,429,085	44.2%
Libertarian	Raymon Doane	56,219	1.7%
Approval Voting	Daniel Doyle	9,817	0.3%
Unity	Stephen Evans	8,965	0.3%
Write-in		0	0.0%
Total votes		3,234,808	100.00%
Democratic gain from Republican			

U.S. House of Representatives
Preceded by Betsy Markey	Member of the U.S. House of Representatives from Colorado's 4th congressional district 2011–2015	Succeeded by Ken Buck
Party political offices
Preceded by Bob Schaffer	Republican nominee for U.S. Senator from Colorado (Class 2); 2014, 2020	Succeeded by Mark Baisley
Preceded by Roger Wicker	Chair of the National Republican Senatorial Committee; 2017–2019	Succeeded by Todd Young
U.S. Senate
Preceded by Mark Udall	U.S. Senator (Class 2) from Colorado; 2015–2021; Served alongside: Michael Bennet	Succeeded by John Hickenlooper
U.S. order of precedence (ceremonial)
Preceded by Mark Udall as Former U.S. Senator	Order of precedence of the United States	Succeeded by Heidi Heitkamp as Former U.S. Senator
