= Wayne Allard =

American politician (born 1943)

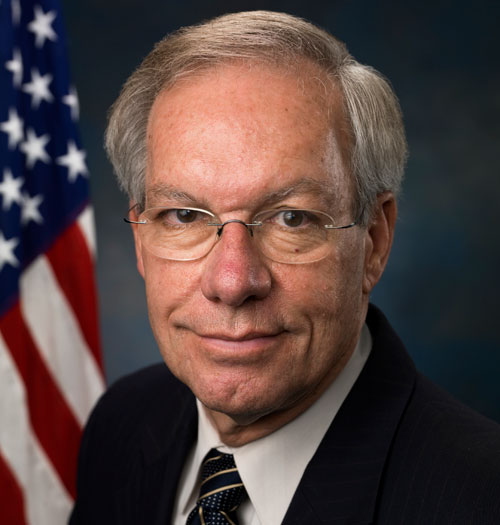

United States Senator from Colorado
- In office January 3, 1997 – January 3, 2009
- Preceded by: Hank Brown
- Succeeded by: Mark Udall

Member of the U.S. House of Representatives from Colorado's 4th district
- In office January 3, 1991 – January 3, 1997
- Preceded by: Hank Brown
- Succeeded by: Bob Schaffer

Member of the Colorado Senate from the 15th district
- In office January 5, 1983 – January 9, 1991
- Preceded by: Samuel Barnhill
- Succeeded by: James Roberts

Personal details
- Born: Alan Wayne Allard; December 2, 1943 (age 82) Fort Collins, Colorado, U.S.
- Party: Republican
- Spouse: Joan Malcolm (m. 1967)
- Children: 2
- Education: Colorado State University (DVM)
- Allard's voice Allard supporting the renaming of a post office after former Pres. Gerald Ford. Recorded January 8, 2007

Alan Wayne Allard (born December 2, 1943) is an American veterinarian and politician who served as a United States representative (1991–1997) and United States senator (1997–2009) from Colorado, as well as previously a Colorado state senator (1983–1991). A member of the Republican Party, he did not seek re-election to the U.S. Senate in 2008. In February 2009, he began work as a lobbyist at the Livingston Group, a Washington, D.C.–based government relations consulting firm.

== Early life ==
Allard was born in Fort Collins, Colorado, the son of Sibyl Jean (née Stewart) and Amos Wilson Allard. He is descended from immigrants from Canada and Scotland. He was raised on a ranch near Walden, Colorado. He received a Doctor of Veterinary Medicine degree from Colorado State University in 1968.

=== State Senate ===
Allard continued to run a veterinary practice full-time, while representing Larimer and Weld counties in the Colorado State Senate, from 1983 to 1990. During his tenure he was a strong supporter of fiscal responsibility and the preservation of a citizen legislature. Allard's influence on local politics is still felt today as he is the sponsor of Colorado's law limiting state legislative sessions to 120 days.

== U.S. House of Representatives ==
Allard served in the United States House of Representatives from Colorado's Fourth Congressional District from 1991 to 1997. As a Colorado Representative, Allard served on the Joint Committee on Congressional Reform, which recommended many of the reforms included in the Contract with America. These reforms became some of the first to be passed by the Republican controlled Congress in 1995 and were the key to their platform.

== U.S. Senate ==
=== Elections ===
In 1996, Allard was elected to the United States Senate, defeating state Attorney General Gale Norton in the Republican primary and Tom Strickland by five percentage points in the general election. He made a pledge at the time to serve just two terms in the Senate before retiring. In 2002, he was re-elected, defeating Strickland again by the same margin.

=== Committee assignments ===
- Committee on Appropriations
  - Interior Subcommittee (Ranking Member)
  - Legislative Branch Subcommittee
  - Energy and Water Development Subcommittee
  - Financial Services and General Government Subcommittee
  - Military Construction and Veterans Affairs Subcommittee
  - Transportation/HUD Subcommittee
- Committee on the Budget
- Committee on Banking, Housing, and Urban Affairs
  - Securities, Insurance, and Investment Subcommittee (Ranking Member)
  - Financial Institutions Subcommittee
  - Housing, Transportation, and Community Development Subcommittee
- Committee on Health, Education, Labor, and Pensions
  - Subcommittee on Children and Families
  - Subcommittee on Employment and Workplace Safety

=== Tenure ===
In 2003, Allard introduced into the Senate the Federal Marriage Amendment, seeking to ban same-sex marriages. The amendment failed to advance to the House.

In 2004, Allard reintroduced the Federal Marriage Amendment with minor changes. In presenting the amendment, Allard made the case that there is a "master plan" to "destroy the institution of marriage". Passage of the proposed Amendment failed 227 yea votes to 186 nay votes, where 290 yea votes (two-thirds) are required for passage of a proposed Constitutional amendment.

In an April 2006 article, Time named Allard as one of America's 5 Worst Senators, dubbing him "The Invisible Man". The article criticised him for being "so bland that his critics have dubbed him "Dullard"", for "never playing a role in major legislation, even though he's on two key Senate committees, Budget and Appropriations" and for "rarely speaking on the floor or holding press conferences to push his ideas", concluding that "few of the bills he has introduced over the past year have passed". The article did however note that he was "polite, affable and willing to take on thankless tasks, such as his current role overseeing the construction of a visitors center on Capitol Hill". In response, two major Colorado newspapers defended the Senator. The Rocky Mountain News retorted that Time had made the "wrong call" and that Allard was a "hard-working advocate for Colorado interests." The Gazette (Colorado Springs) also weighed in, saying the article was "... soft, subjective, snide, impressionistic slop – further proof of the low to which this once-serious publication has sunk." Upon his retirement, The Denver Post stated that "While we didn't always agree with Sen. Wayne Allard on policy matters, we never doubted that he was working hard for Colorado."

On January 15, 2007, Allard announced he would fulfill a 1996 campaign promise to serve only two Senate terms and would retire in January 2009.

In April 2007, Allard announced his endorsement of Mitt Romney for the Republican nomination for President of the United States. He switched his endorsement to John McCain once he secured his spot as the presumptive Republican nominee.

As part of a statement released by his office in support of a day to honor emergency first responders in 2007, Allard was quoted as saying: "First responders in Colorado have recently provided critical services in the face of blizzards and tornados. Since I don't think first responders have really done anything significant in comparison to their counterparts who have dealt with real natural disasters, I have no idea what else to say here …"

In March 2008, the National Journal ranked him the second most-conservative U.S. Senator based on his 2007 votes.

One of the legislative staffers in Allard’s Capitol Hill office during his time in the Senate was Cory Gardner, who would eventually succeed Allard in office.

== Political positions ==
=== Environmental record ===
Allard was a co-sponsor of the James Peak Wilderness Bill, which created a 14,000-acre (57 km^{2}) preserve around James Peak, and added 3,000 acres (12 km^{2}) to the Indian Peak Protection Area. He also sponsored legislation which created Colorado's 85,000-acre (340 km^{2}) Great Sand Dunes National Park and Preserve. Allard was also chairman and founder of the Senate Renewable Energy and Efficiency Caucus.

In 2006, the environmental group Republicans for Environmental Protection praised Allard for his support of legislation to make the Army Corps of Engineers more accountable for its projects' environmental and economic impact, but criticized him for supporting oil drilling both offshore and in Alaska's Arctic National Wildlife Refuge. The nonpartisan League of Conservation Voters issued Allard a grade of 29% for 2006.

== Later career ==
Shortly after leaving office in 2009, Allard began work at the Washington, D.C.–based lobbying firm, The Livingston Group. In 2011, he joined the American Motorcycle Association in a government relations role.

== Personal life ==
While completing veterinary school, Allard married Joan Malcolm, who received her degree in microbiology, also from CSU. They then founded their veterinary practice, the Allard Animal Hospital. The Allards raised their two daughters, Christi and Cheryl, in Loveland, Colorado, and have five grandsons. He is a Protestant.

In 2007, Allard authored Colorado's U.S. Senators: A Biographical Guide. The book was published by Fulcrum Publishing.

== Electoral history ==
1990 United States House of Representatives elections
Party	Candidate	Votes	%
Republican	Wayne Allard	89,285	54
Democratic	Richard R. "Dick" Bond	75,901	46
Total votes		165,186	100
Republican hold			

1992 United States House of Representatives elections
Party	Candidate	Votes	%
Republican	Wayne Allard (inc.)	139,884	58
Democratic	Tom Redder	101,957	42
Total votes		241,841	100
Republican hold			

1994 United States House of Representatives elections
Party	Candidate	Votes	%
Republican	Wayne Allard (inc.)	136,251	72
Democratic	Cathy Kipp	52,202	28
Total votes		188,453	100
Republican hold			

1996 Race for U.S. Senate – Republican Primary

- Wayne Allard (R), 57%
- Gale Norton (R), 43%

1996 United States Senate election in Colorado
Party	Candidate	Votes	%	±%
Republican	Wayne Allard	750,325	51%	−4%
Democratic	Tom Strickland	677,600	46%	+4%
Natural Law	Randy MacKenzie	41,620	3%	
Write-ins		66	0%	
Majority		82,715	6%	−8%
Turnout		1,459,601		
Republican hold		Swing		

2002 United States Senate election in Colorado
Party	Candidate	Votes	%	±%
Republican	Wayne Allard (inc.)	717,893	51%	−1%
Democratic	Tom Strickland	648,130	46%	0%
Constitution	Douglas Campbell	21,547	2%	
Libertarian	Rick Stanley	20,776	1%	
Independent	John Heckman	7,140	<1%	
Write-ins		596	0%	
Majority		69,763	5%	−1%
Turnout		1,416,082		
Republican hold		Swing		

== See also ==
- 2008 United States Senate election in Colorado

== Footnotes ==
U.S. House of Representatives
Preceded by Hank Brown	Member of the U.S. House of Representatives from Colorado's 4th congressional district 1991–1997	Succeeded by Bob Schaffer
Party political offices
Preceded by Hank Brown	Republican nominee for U.S. Senator from Colorado (Class 2); 1996, 2002	Succeeded by Bob Schaffer
U.S. Senate
Preceded by Hank Brown	U.S. Senator (Class 2) from Colorado; 1997–2009; Served alongside: Ben Nighthorse Campbell, Ken Salazar	Succeeded by Mark Udall
U.S. order of precedence (ceremonial)
Preceded by Gary Hart as Former U.S. Senator	Order of precedence of the United States as Former U.S. Senator	Succeeded by Tom Udall as Former U.S. Senator
