= Tom Strickland =

American politician and lawyer (born 1952)

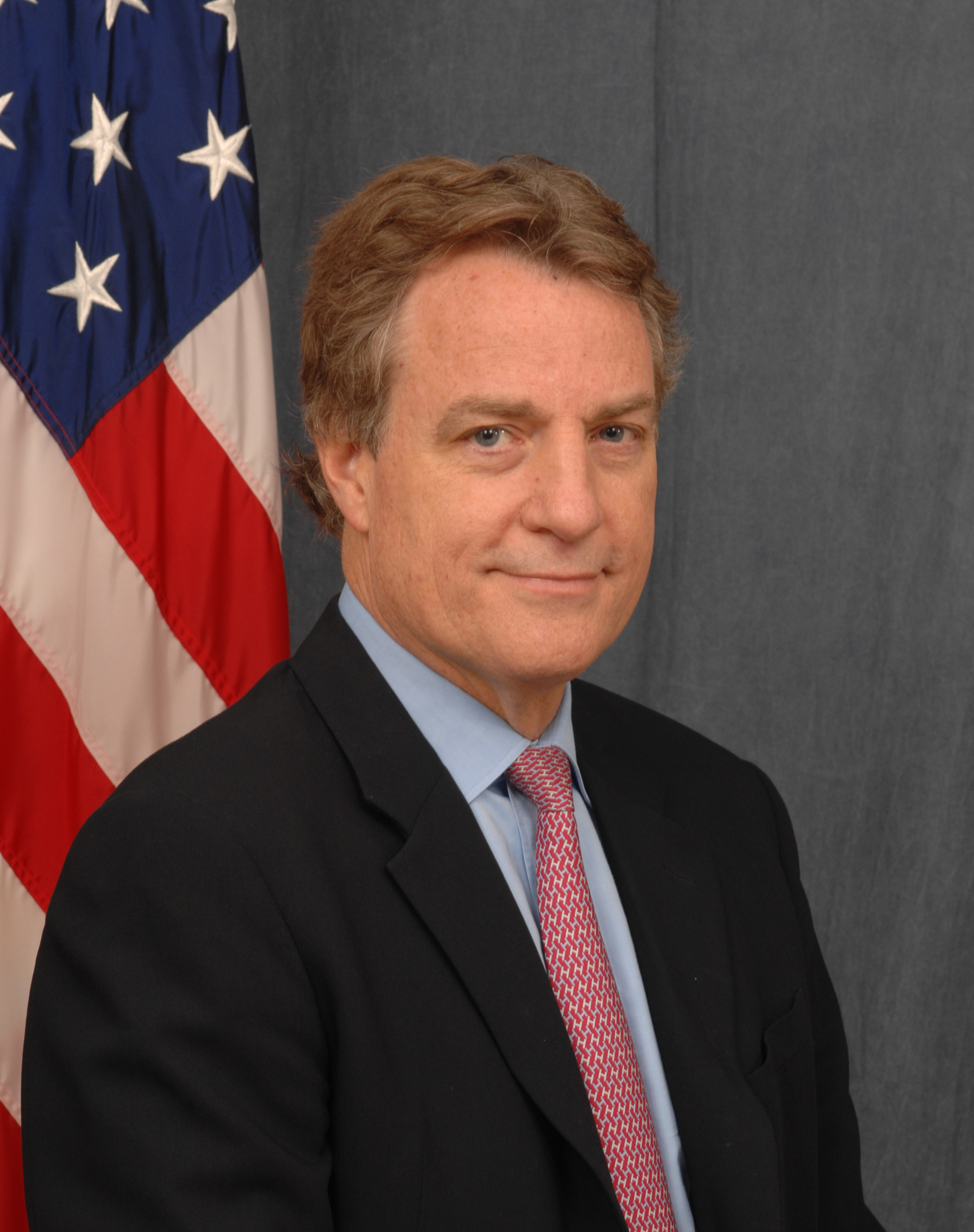

Assistant Secretary of the Interior for Fish, Wildlife and Parks
- In office May 2009 – February 2011
- President: Barack Obama
- Preceded by: Lyle Laverty
- Succeeded by: Rachel Jacobson (acting)

United States Attorney for the District of Colorado
- In office April 21, 1999 – January 20, 2001
- President: Bill Clinton
- Preceded by: Henry Solano
- Succeeded by: John Suthers

Personal details
- Born: Thomas Lee Strickland; May 16, 1952 (age 74) Texas, U.S.
- Party: Democratic
- Education: Louisiana State University, Baton Rouge (BA); University of Texas, Austin (JD)

Thomas Lee Strickland (born May 16, 1952) is an American lawyer who was formerly chief of staff to Interior Secretary Ken Salazar and Assistant Secretary for Fish and Wildlife and Parks in the Interior Department. Strickland served as United States Attorney for Colorado and was the Democratic nominee for U.S. Senate for Colorado in 1996 and 2002. He joined WilmerHale as a partner in September, 2011.

== Early life and family ==
Tom Strickland was born in Texas but attended Louisiana State University where he took a degree in English literature, with honors, and played football. He has three daughters, Lauren, Annie, and Caroline.

== Career ==
=== Education and early career ===
In 1977 he graduated with honors from the University of Texas School of Law then clerked for U.S. District Court Judge Carl Olaf Bue Jr. in the Southern District of Texas. Prior to his appointment as U.S. Attorney Strickland was associated for 15 years with what was then Brownstein, Hyatt, Farber & Strickland rising to named partner. The firm was a prominent Colorado law firm noted for its political connections.

From 1982 to 1984 Strickland served as director of policy for Colorado Governor Richard Lamm, advising the governor on all policy and intergovernmental issues. He went on to serve and chair the Colorado Transportation Commission from 1985 to 1989. Strickland was, with Ken Salazar, one of the founders and a board member of Great Outdoors Colorado, a lottery-funded endowment for Colorado's public parks created in 1992.

=== United States Attorney for Colorado ===
Assuming the office United States Attorney for Colorado the day after the Columbine High School massacre, Strickland's legacy as U.S. Attorney is his tough stance on gun crime. Shortly after taking office, Strickland led efforts to enact Colorado's Project Exile, under which Federal and local prosecutors would cooperate to bring gun charges under state or federal laws, whichever would offer the toughest sentence. During its first year, Colorado Project Exile doubled the number of people who were charged with violating state and federal gun laws in Colorado. Under Strickland's leadership, the project launched with support from gun rights groups including the National Rifle Association and gun control groups such as Handgun Control, Inc.

Strickland's most notable cases include the prosecution of 25 people associated with a major cocaine distribution ring outside of Colorado Springs, Colo., the indictment of 42 people associated with a motorcycle gang, and the indictment of representatives from three drug running organizations in one of the largest drug roundups in the state's history. In 2000, he prosecuted of the largest drug bust in Longmont's history, an investigation that grew to include California and Nebraska and involved the Internal Revenue Service, the U.S. Attorney's office, the Federal Housing Authority and the Bureau of Alcohol, Tobacco, Firearms and Explosives.

Strickland also levied 37 felony counts of selling large quantities of guns to criminals against Gregory Golyansky, his brother Leonid and their employee and cousin, Dmitry Baravik, in a politically charged trial that ended in a plea bargain with a sentence of just one day of probation and a lifetime ban on selling firearms. While critics charged that Strickland targeted the Golyanskys because of their Republican leanings, John Suthers, Strickland's replacement and a Republican, reviewed the case and decided to continue prosecuting despite alleged problems with the case. As Suthers explained, "You've got to rely on hard-core criminals as witnesses. The girlfriends of hard-core criminals are not exactly spectacular witnesses either." In addition, Strickland went after human traffickers as demonstrated by his commitment to prosecuting three people in charges of transporting illegal immigrants after a van crash in northeast Colorado that killed six men. The victims were packed into a van with 14 other passengers who also sustained injuries when a tractor trailer ran into the back of the van.

After almost two years on the job, Strickland left office after acquiring "a reputation as a tough, effective law-and-order prosecutor," according to an editorial appearing in The Denver Post just prior to the end of Strickland's tenure as U.S. Attorney.

=== Hogan & Hartson ===
Following his second unsuccessful run for the U.S. Senate Strickland joined the international law firm Hogan & Hartson and rose rapidly to the position of managing partner for the firm's Denver office hiring Scott McInnis, a Republican and former Colorado congressman, and Bill Ritter, a Democrat and former Denver district attorney who would become Colorado's governor. He was also a member of Hogan & Hartson's executive committee.

=== UnitedHealth Group ===
On April 24, 2007, he was appointed executive vice president and chief legal officer of UnitedHealth Group, a diversified health and well-being company headquartered in Minneapolis, Minnesota and serving more than 70 million individuals nationwide. He was brought in as part of a new management team following a "stock options backdating scandal" and was credited for having "cleaned up the backdating mess." At UnitedHealth, he managed an in-house team of 200 attorneys and a nationwide team of outside counsel. He was responsible for all legal, regulatory and compliance matters and implemented a number of corporate governance initiatives.

=== Department of the Interior ===
On January 21, 2009, it was announced that Strickland had accepted an appointment to serve in President Barack Obama's administration as the chief of staff and Assistant Secretary for Fish and Wildlife and Parks in the Department of the Interior. On his retirement from the Department of the Interior he was praised by Secretary of the Interior Ken Salazar and by the editorial board of The Denver Post for his role in America's Great Outdoors Program which is modeled after the popular and successful Great Outdoors Colorado program. America's Great Outdoors, which led to the passage of the Omnibus Public Land Management Act of 2009, was heralded as one of the most important conservation measures in decades. His work on restoration of the Everglades, protecting the bluefin tuna, and the environmental impact of the Deepwater Horizon oil spill was cited.

=== WilmerHale ===
Strickland joined Wilmer Cutler Pickering Hale and Dorr in 2011 and is a partner in the firm's Regulatory and Government Affairs, Litigation/Controversy and Securities Departments. His practice focuses on a range of matters at the intersection of law, business, and government policy, including government enforcement cases, Congressional and internal investigations, corporate governance, and high-stakes crisis management matters. Additionally, he has particular expertise in natural resources and environmental law, health care regulation and securities law.

=== Professional activities ===
In March, 2013, Strickland was appointed by Interior Secretary Ken Salazar to serve on the National Fish and Wildlife Foundation Board (NFWF), which was recently designated by the United States Department of Justice to distribute the $2.5 billion in criminal penalties from the Deepwater Horizon oil spill to the five Gulf Coast States.

== U.S. Senate campaigns ==
=== 1996 election ===
The United States Senate election in Colorado in 1996 was for the open seat which resulted from the retirement of Hank Brown. Strickland had represented the Sierra Club and had served on the regional board of the Environmental Defense Fund; he was endorsed by nearly every environmental group in Colorado; however, his Republican opponent, Wayne Allard, borrowed a tactic from Strickland's law partner, Steve Farber, and painted him as "the polluters' lawyer" in commercials based on research of his record of legal work for numerous clients over a ten-year legal career. He could only reply by referencing his duty to represent his clients' interests zealously. He fell behind in the polls and eventually lost.

=== 2002 election ===
The 2002 election for the U.S. Senate, with the same candidates running, resulted in a narrow victory for Allard. A record-breaking total of $9 million was raised by the candidates. The campaign was characterized by mutual accusations that the other candidate was linked with a powerful communications company, Allard with Qwest and Strickland with Global Crossing. Allard's winning strategy was to characterize Strickland as a "millionaire-lawyer-lobbyist." Strickland ran on moderate positions. Both candidates had help from prominent party leaders, Allard being helped by President George W. Bush and Strickland campaigned just like in 1996 alongside former President Bill Clinton.

Party political offices
Preceded by Josie Heath	Democratic nominee for U.S. Senator from Colorado (Class 2); 1996, 2002	Succeeded by Mark Udall
