= Bob Schaffer =

American politician (born 1962)

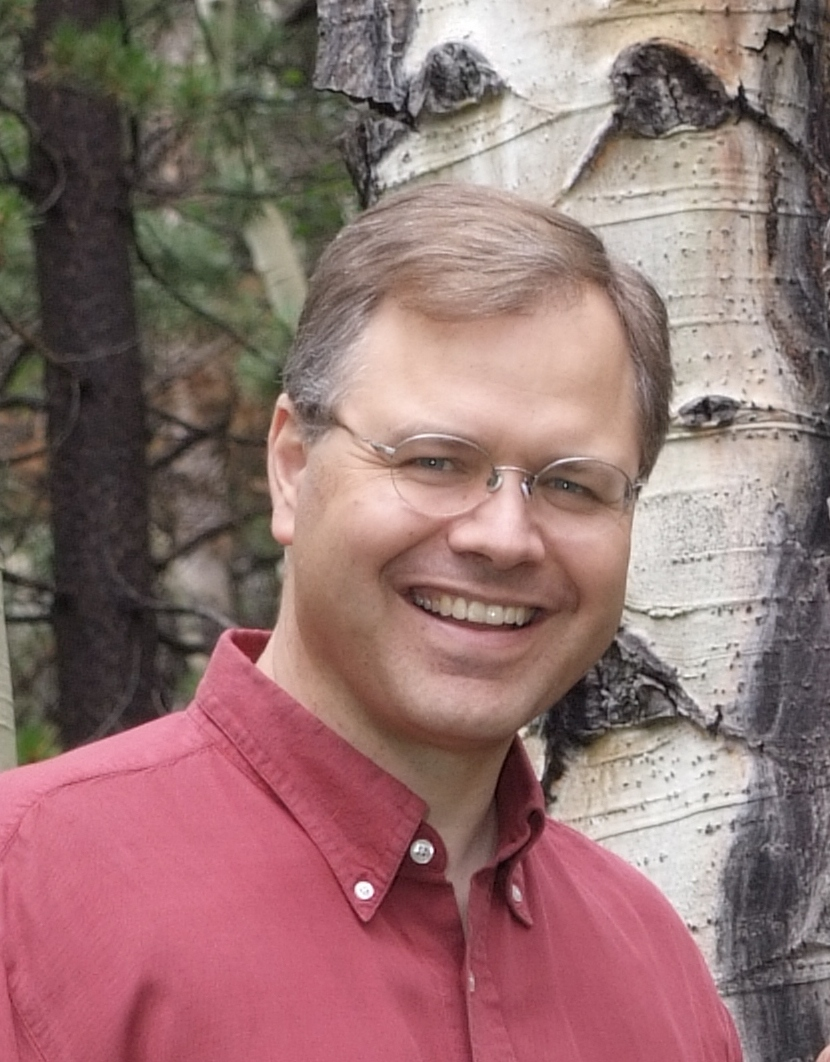

Member of the U.S. House of Representatives from Colorado's 4th district
- In office January 3, 1997 – January 3, 2003
- Preceded by: Wayne Allard
- Succeeded by: Marilyn Musgrave

Member of the Colorado Senate from the 14th district
- In office 1987–1996
- Preceded by: Jim Beatty
- Succeeded by: Peggy Reeves

Personal details
- Born: Robert Warren Schaffer; July 24, 1962 (age 64) Cincinnati, Ohio, U.S.
- Party: Republican
- Spouse: Maureen Schaffer
- Education: University of Dayton (BA)

Robert Warren Schaffer (born July 24, 1962) is an American businessman and politician who served in the United States House of Representatives representing Colorado's 4th district from 1997 to 2003. A Republican, Schaffer was co-chairman of the Congressional Ukrainian Caucus, and an outspoken leader in promoting American interests and human rights in Eastern Europe.

Schaffer is currently Headmaster of Liberty Common High School in Fort Collins, Colorado. Under Schaffer's leadership, two classes have broken the state's all-time record composite ACT and SAT scores, respectively.

In 2004, Schaffer ran in the Republican primary for Colorado's open Senate seat, losing by 20 points. He was the Republican nominee for Colorado's other Senate seat in the 2008 election, losing to Democratic nominee Mark Udall.

== Biography ==
=== Early years ===
Schaffer was born in Cincinnati, Ohio and raised Catholic. He attended Archbishop Moeller High School.

The son of public-school teachers, Schaffer worked his way through college as a farm hand. In 1984, he graduated from the University of Dayton with a B.A. in Political Science. He was later awarded an honorary doctorate in Management from Colorado Technical University.

== Colorado State Senator ==
Schaffer served for nine years as a Colorado State Senator in the Colorado General Assembly. Schaffer was only 25 years old in 1987 when he was appointed to finish Colorado State Senator Jim Beatty's term, making Schaffer the youngest to serve in Colorado's Senate. As a Colorado Senator, he was Chairman of the Finance Committee, the State Veterans and Military Affairs Committee, and the Local Government Committee. Schaffer also was the Vice-Chairman of the Senate Education Committee. Schaffer was awarded the "National Republican Legislator of the Year for 1995" by the National Republican Legislators Association.

In 1993, Schaffer made headlines when he removed a display from the Capitol—that was in clear view of visiting children—that contained pamphlets describing "unsafe sexual practices."

== U.S. Congressman ==
Schaffer was first elected to the U.S. Congress in November 1996 representing Colorado's 4th congressional district, succeeding Wayne Allard and Hank Brown.

Schaffer served three terms in Congress, fulfilling the three-term pledge he made during his first Congressional campaign.

Schaffer upheld his pledge in spite of pleas from national Republicans and President George W. Bush to run for another term. Schaffer led no fewer than four congressional delegations to Ukraine, and offered an ultimately unsuccessful balanced budget resolution and amendment. He was described as fiscally and socially conservative and to the right of the center of the party.

His education policy work focused on school-choice and local control, and Schaffer was remembered for being able to help his Republican colleagues form their arguments when debating this issue. He was succeeded by Marilyn Musgrave in January 2003. His congressional colleagues recount his tenure in congress as an education-policy expert.

Schaffer is of Ukrainian heritage, the son of a Ukrainian immigrant to the United States. He has received multiple recognitions for his advocacy of Ukraine–United States relations, and for defense of Ukraine's territorial integrity under the 1994 Budapest Memorandum. Schaffer was co-founder and co-chair of the Congressional Ukrainian Caucus. Schaffer served as an election observer in Ukraine during parliamentary election 2002 and presidential election 2004 (“Orange Revolution”).

The American Conservative Union gave him a 100% evaluation in 2001.

== Post-2002 career ==
=== Liberty Common High School ===
In 2010, Schaffer was appointed principal of Liberty Common High School, a college-preparatory charter school in the Poudre School District in Fort Collins, Colorado. During his time at Liberty Common, the first four graduating classes posted the highest average composite ACT score in Colorado, with the class of 2015 breaking the state record. In 2017, Schaffer was appointed headmaster of both Liberty Common High School and Liberty Common School, its elementary counterpart.

==== Controversy ====
In May 2019, Liberty Common High School banned four seniors from attending graduation. The seniors had bought condoms and distributed them in lockers across the school; they claimed this action was a statement against Schaffer's criticism of Colorado House Bill 19-1032, which would mandate comprehensive sex education in Colorado schools. Schaffer condemned the distribution of condoms as "sexual bullying." The incident was covered in statewide news and generated minor controversy in the school community. In 2019, Liberty Common High School was granted a waiver from the sex education bill.

=== Energy Industry ===
Schaffer was vice-president for business development at Aspect Energy, LLC., where he was involved in a variety of energy, mining and education projects, working primarily in wind energy. He was also a board member on the National Alternative Fuels Foundation, but environmental groups released attack ads during the 2008 U.S. Senate race highlighting Shcaffer's congressional vote which gave $2.5 billion to alternative energy research and a much larger amount to traditional energy research and tax credits.

=== Board Member ===
Schaffer served as president of the Parental Alliance for Choice in Education, a non-profit corporation promoting school choice reform in Colorado's public education system, and is active in the state's transformation to a market-driven education system.

==== Leadership Program of the Rockies ====
Schaffer has been chairman of the Leadership Program of the Rockies, a nonprofit corporation that provides economic education and civic-leadership training in Colorado. Schaffer is a regular columnist for the Fort Collins Coloradoan daily newspaper. Schaffer was also an opinion columnist for the now-defunct Northern Colorado Courier.

==== Colorado League of Charter Schools ====
Since 2003, Schaffer has been chairman of Leadership Program of the Rockies, a nonprofit organization providing economic education and civic-leadership training in Colorado.

==== Republican National Committee ====
In March 2005, Schaffer was elected Republican National Committeeman for Colorado.

==== Colorado State Board of Education ====
Schaffer was appointed to fill a vacancy on the Colorado State Board of Education by a party vacancy committee, representing a district that is coterminous with the state's Fourth Congressional District. He successfully ran for the seat in 2006, against Democrat Tom Griggs. In January, 2009, Schaffer was made chairman of the Colorado State Board of Education with a unanimous decision of the four Republican and three Democratic board members. Fellow board members elected Schaffer to continue his chairmanship in 2011.

As Chairman of the Colorado State Board of Education, Schaffer borrowed ideas from Singapore and Finland when working to create new forward-thinking standards that are both internationally benchmarked and designed to grow students’ strategic thinking capabilities over fact memorization.

Citing the importance of letting parents know if someone proximal to their children has been arrested, Schaffer took a leadership role in the effort to require parent notification if a school employee is arrested or charged with a serious crime. The measure went into effect in April 2011 despite strong opposition from the Colorado Education Association, the state-based teachers' unions.

Schaffer maintained the position throughout the debating of the measure that parents are in the best position to make decisions about their children's safety. He voted against adopting Common Core standards, but the federal standards passed on a 4-3 vote. Adopting the standards were a keystone factor to the Colorado's application for $175 million in Race to the Top funds. In early 2011, Schaffer took heat from Democratic State Board of Education member Mary Johnson. The disagreement was over Schaffer's inviting William Maloney, Colorado education commissioner under both parties from 1997 to 2007, who spoke on “three incontestable realities concerning which America has been in denial for decades,” regarding America's education performance on a global scale, the unsustainable costs of education, and the availability of better models for the path forward.

Under Schaffer's chairmanship tenure, unanimous charter school guidelines were adopted. The new concrete rules adopted best practices for charter school authorization.

==== Other ====
He is the Colorado Chairman of the Judicial Confirmation Network. In 2006, Schaffer founded Dreamsoft Colorado, LLC, a firm that creates high-end interactive websites for business and political clients. He is also the President of AMDG LLC. As a member of the Fort Collins, Colorado community, he owned a small business.

== 2004 U.S. Senate race ==
In 2004, Schaffer contended for the Republican nomination to the U.S. Senate after incumbent Republican Ben Nighthorse Campbell chose not to run for re-election. Brewing magnate Pete Coors opposed Schaffer. Coors entered the bitter primary battle after Schaffer faced down potential contenders such as David Liniger, founder of ReMax. The nomination battle concluded when Coors won the Republican nomination over Schaffer with 61% of the vote. Coors went on to lose to Democratic nominee Ken Salazar in the 2004 general election.

== 2008 U.S. Senate election ==
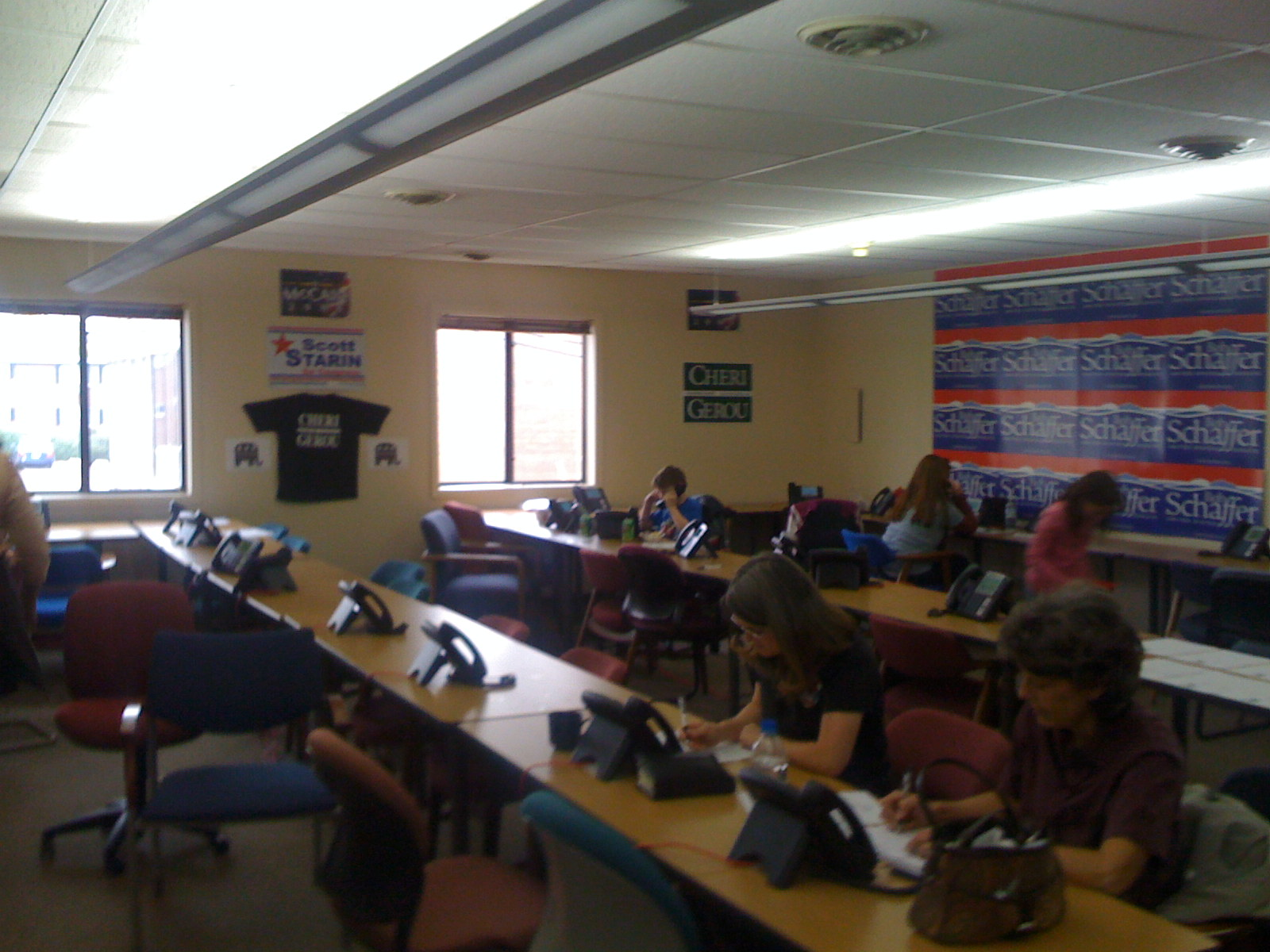
Schaffer's Jefferson County field office in 2008

Schaffer was the Republican nominee for the open seat of retiring Senator Wayne Allard. He lost to Mark Udall, the Democratic nominee.

On May 9, 2007, Schaffer filed his official statement of candidacy with the Federal Elections Commission. On May 12, 2007, he made an official announcement in Boulder that he would run for the Senate to a group of over 150 Republicans attending a fundraising event.

On September 28, 2008, Udall and Schaffer appeared on Meet the Press's Senate Debate series, discussing the proposed bailout of the U.S. financial system.

=== Political opposition ===
In 2008, the League of Conservation Voters named Schaffer a member of its "Dirty Dozen" because of an anti-environmental record during his tenure in Congress.

In 2001, then-congressman Schaffer voted for President Bush's energy plan that Democrats argued was a $33 billion gift to the oil corporations. Republicans argued that the bill would help reduce America's dependence on foreign oil.

=== Endorsements ===
- Grand Junction Daily Sentinel on October 9, 2008
- The Pueblo Chieftain on October 17, 2008

== Link to the Jack Abramoff Scandals ==
Schaffer was allegedly linked to the Mariana Islands worker abuse scandal by his association with the Traditional Values Coalition. The organization was used by Jack Abramoff to pay for the trip of the then-Congressman to visit the island. The Denver Post reported that the TVC paid the $13,000 travel bill for the trip, organized by Abramoff's lobbying firm. Schaffer criticized the Denver Post's reporting, asserting that he had no contact with the individuals in the report, including Jack Abramoff.

Schaffer claimed that he spoke with local clergy who denied there was a problem of forced abortions in the Northern Marianas, the only area of the United States where abortion is banned by their local constitution. After his return from the islands, Schaffer used his position on the Resources Committee to attack reports of abuses on the islands.

== Federal electoral history ==
1996 United States House of Representatives elections
Party	Candidate	Votes	%
Republican	Bob Schaffer	137,012	56.14
Democratic	Guy Kelley	92,837	38.04
American	Wesley Paul "Wes" McKinley	7,428	3.04
Natural Law	Cynthia Parker	6,790	2.78
Total votes		244,067	100.0
Republican hold			

1998 United States House of Representatives elections
Party	Candidate	Votes	%
Republican	Bob Schaffer (Incumbent)	131,318	59.34
Democratic	Susan Kirkpatrick	89,973	40.66
Total votes		221,291	100.0
Republican hold			

2000 United States House of Representatives elections
Party	Candidate	Votes	%
Republican	Bob Schaffer (Incumbent)	209,078	79.50
Natural Law	Dan Sewell Ward	19,721	7.50
Libertarian	Kordon L. Baker	19,713	7.50
Constitution	Leslie J. Hanks	9,955	3.77
Write-in		4,539	1.73
Total votes		263,006	100.0
Republican hold			

2004 U.S. Senate Republican Primary results (Colorado)
Party	Candidate	Votes	%
Republican	Pete Coors	203,157	60.57%
Republican	Bob Schaffer	132,274	39.43%
Total votes		335,431	100.00%

2008 United States Senate election in Colorado
Party	Candidate	Votes	%	±%
Democratic	Mark Udall	1,231,049	52.80%	+7.03%
Republican	Bob Schaffer	990,784	42.49%	−8.20%
Constitution	Douglas Campbell	59,736	2.56%	+1.04%
Green	Bob Kinsey	50,008	2.14%	N/A
Write-in		135	0.01%	N/A
Total votes		2,331,712	100.00%	N/A
Democratic gain from Republican				

U.S. House of Representatives
Preceded by Wayne Allard	Member of the U.S. House of Representatives from Colorado's 4th congressional district 1997–2003	Succeeded by Marilyn Musgrave
Party political offices
Preceded by Wayne Allard	Republican nominee for U.S. Senator from Colorado (Class 2); 2008	Succeeded by Cory Gardner
U.S. order of precedence (ceremonial)
Preceded by Tom Osborne as Former U.S. Representative	Order of precedence of the United States as Former U.S. Representative	Succeeded by Marilyn Musgrave as Former U.S. Representative
