= 2008 United States Senate election in Colorado =

- November 4, 2008
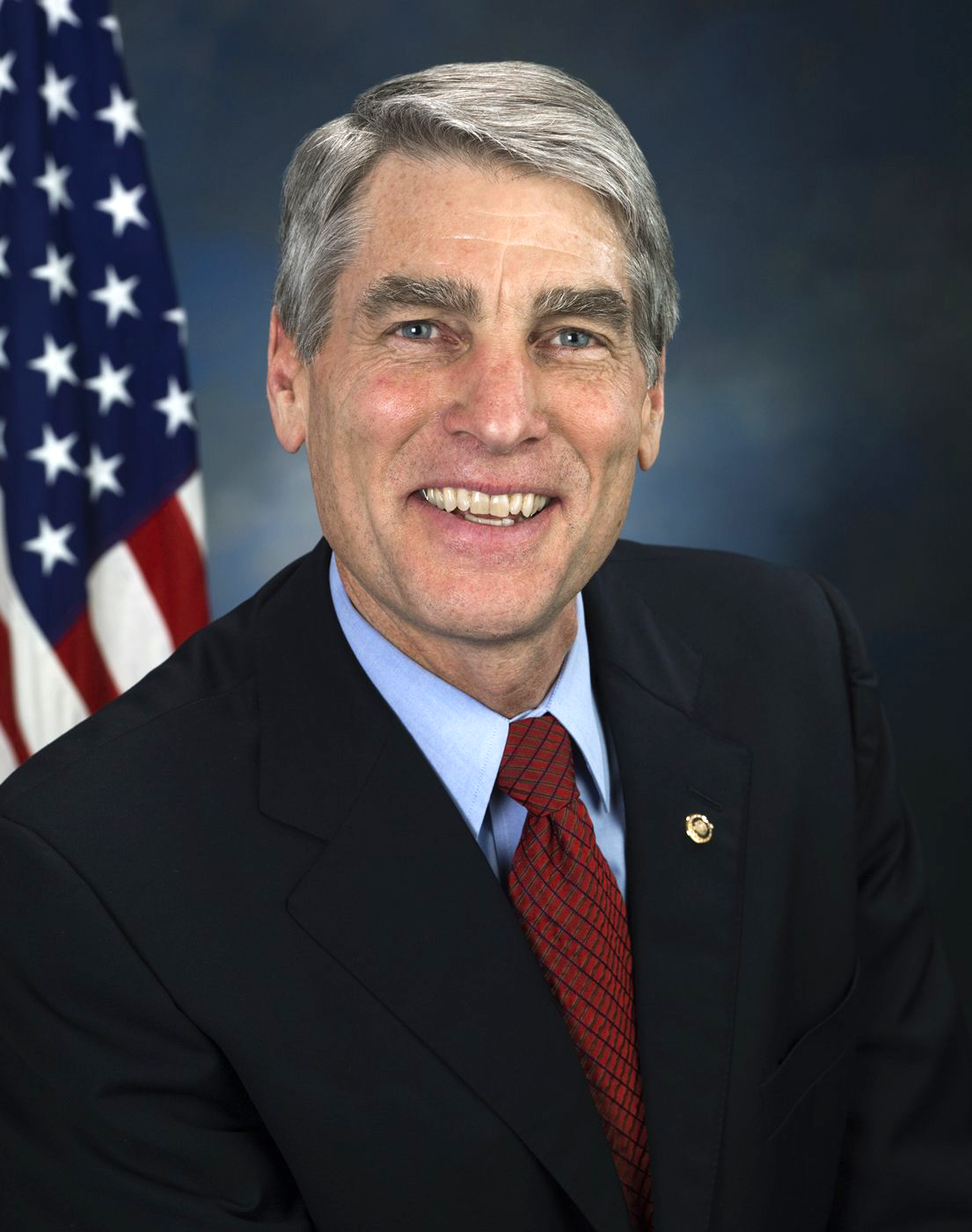

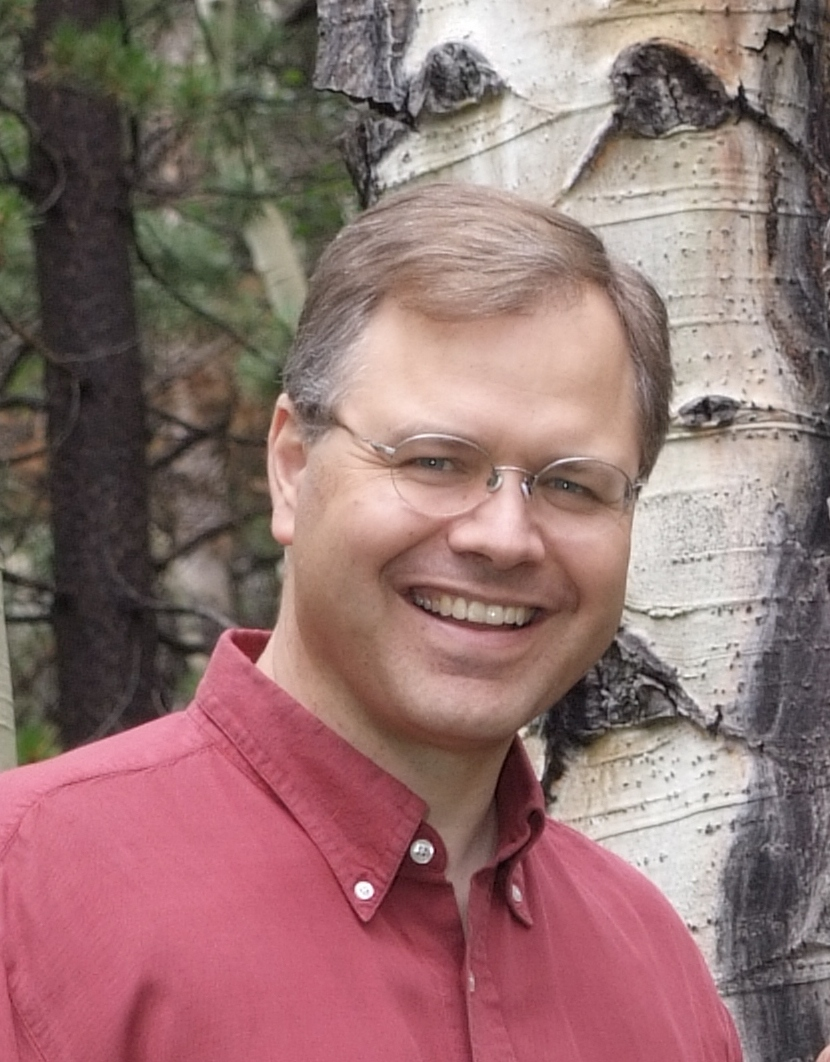
Nominee	Mark Udall	Bob Schaffer
Party	Democratic	Republican
Popular vote	1,231,049	990,784
Percentage	52.80%	42.49%
- Udall: 40–50% 50–60% 60–70% 70–80% 80–90% >90% Schaffer: 40–50% 50–60% 60–70% 70–80% 80–90% Tie: 40–50% No votes
U.S. senator before election
Wayne Allard
Republican
Elected U.S. Senator
Mark Udall
Democratic

The 2008 United States Senate election in Colorado was held November 4, 2008. The primary elections were held August 12, 2008. Incumbent Republican U.S. Senator Wayne Allard decided to retire instead of seeking a third term. Democratic nominee Mark Udall won the open seat, making this the first time a Democrat won this seat since 1972, and that Democrats held both Senate seats since 1979.

== Democratic primary ==
=== Candidates ===
- Mark Udall, U.S. Representative

=== Results ===
Democratic primary results
Party	Candidate	Votes	%
Democratic	Mark Udall	194,227	100.00%
Total votes		194,227	100.00%

== Republican primary ==
=== Candidates ===
- Bob Schaffer, Colorado State Board of Education member, former U.S. Representative and candidate for the U.S. Senate in 2004

=== Results ===
Republican primary results
Party	Candidate	Votes	%
Republican	Bob Schaffer	239,212	100.00%
Total votes		239,212	100.00%

== General election ==
=== Campaign ===
The election featured an open contest because incumbent U.S. Senator Wayne Allard declined to seek re-election. He honored his 1996 pledge to serve no more than two terms in the U.S. Senate and announced that he would retire from his service to the US Senate and not seek a 3rd term, leaving Colorado's Class II Senate seat open. Both parties believed this senate contest would be one of the most competitive senate races during the 2008 election.

=== Predictions ===
Source	Ranking	As of
The Cook Political Report	Lean D (flip)	October 23, 2008
CQ Politics	Likely D (flip)	October 31, 2008
Rothenberg Political Report	Likely D (flip)	November 2, 2008
Real Clear Politics	Likely D (flip)	October 28, 2008

=== Polling ===
Poll source	Dates administered	Mark Udall (D)	Bob Schaffer (R)
Hill Research Consultants	August 26–28, 2007	45%	40%
Ciruli Associates	September 12–15, 2007	36%	35%
SurveyUSA	October 27–30, 2007	48%	41%
Rasmussen Reports	November 28, 2007	41%	42%
Research for Change	December 3–5, 2007	39%	37%
Rasmussen Reports	February 11, 2008	43%	44%
McLaughlin & Associates/ Coalition for a Democratic Workplace	March 6–9, 2008	44%	32%
Rasmussen Reports	March 17, 2008	46%	43%
New Leadership USA/TargetPoint	March 31 – April 7, 2008	45%	45%
Rasmussen Reports	April 16, 2008	45%	42%
Rasmussen Reports	May 19, 2008	47%	41%
Rasmussen Reports	June 17, 2008	49%	40%
Garin-Hart-Yang/DSCC	June 15–17, 2008	46%	37%
Quinnipiac	June 26, 2008	48%	38%
Public Policy Polling (PPP)	July 10, 2008	47%	38%
Keith Frederick	July 22, 2008	48%	39%
Rasmussen Reports	July 22, 2008	49%	46%
Quinnipiac	July 24, 2008	44%	44%
Rasmussen Reports	August 13, 2008	50%	42%
Hill Research Consultants	August 24, 2008	41%	38%
Tarrance Group	September 3, 2008	41%	40%
Public Policy Polling	September 21, 2008	48%	40%
Quinnipiac	September 14–21, 2008	48%	40%
Rasmussen Reports	September 23, 2008	46%	44%
Denver Post	September 29 – October 1, 2008	43%	38%
Ciruli Associates	October 1, 2008	45%	38%
Rasmussen Reports	October 16, 2008	51%	44%

=== Results ===
2008 United States Senate election in Colorado
Party	Candidate	Votes	%	±%
Democratic	Mark Udall	1,231,049	52.80%	+7.03%
Republican	Bob Schaffer	990,784	42.49%	−8.20%
Constitution	Douglas Campbell	59,736	2.56%	+1.04%
Green	Bob Kinsey	50,008	2.14%	N/A
Write-in		135	0.01%	N/A
Total votes		2,331,712	100.00%	N/A
Democratic gain from Republican				

==== Counties that flipped from Republican to Democratic ====
- Alamosa (largest municipality: Alamosa)
- Arapahoe (largest city: Aurora)
- Broomfield
- Chaffee (largest city: Salida)
- Conejos (largest municipality: Manassa)
- Eagle (largest municipality: Edwards)
- Grand (Largest city: Granby)
- Garfield (largest municipality: Glenwood Springs)
- Jefferson (largest city: Lakewood)
- Larimer (largest city: Fort Collins)
- Mineral (Largest city: Creede)
- Ouray (largest city: Ouray)
- San Juan (largest municipality: Silverton)

== See also ==
- 2008 United States Senate elections
