= 1996 United States Senate election in Colorado =

- November 5, 1996
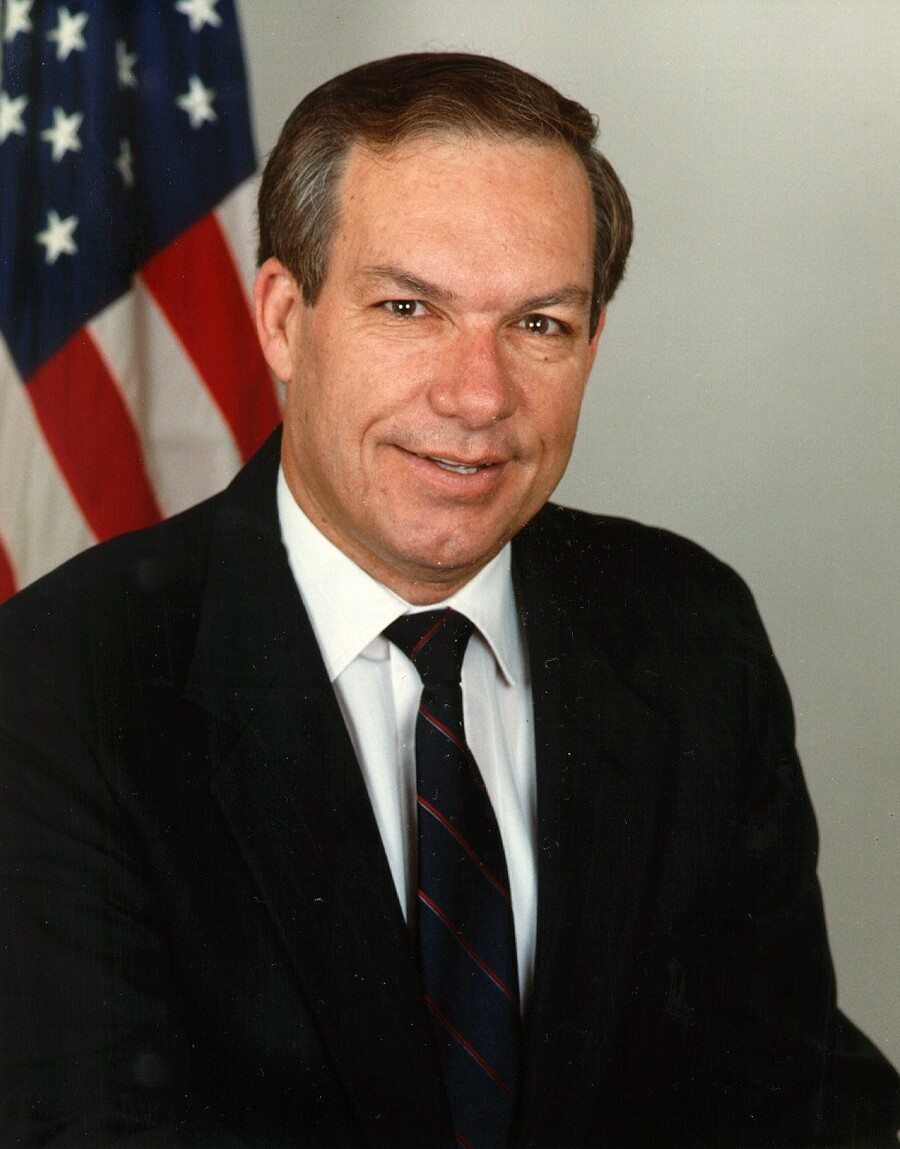

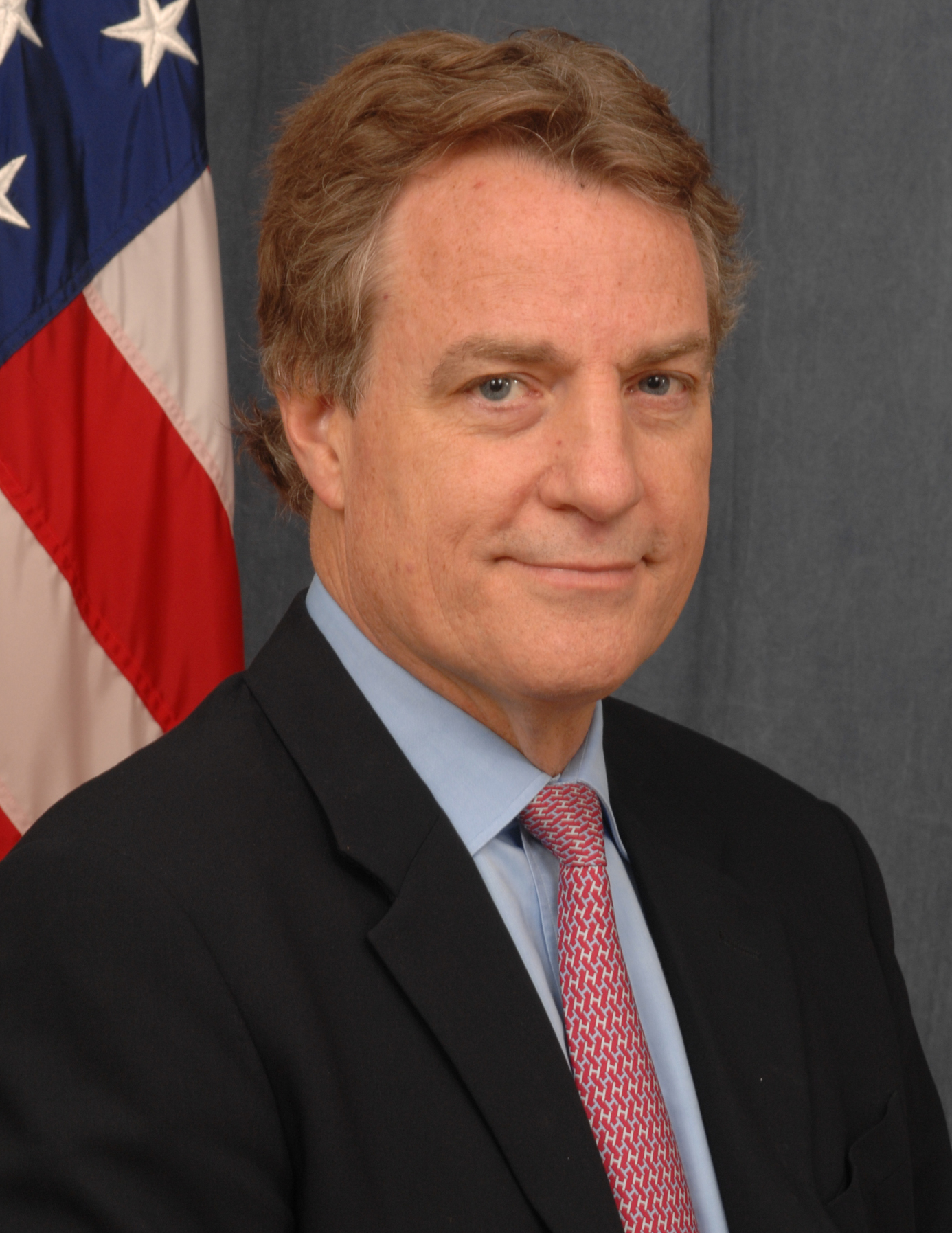
Nominee	Wayne Allard	Tom Strickland
Party	Republican	Democratic
Popular vote	750,315	667,600
Percentage	51.41%	45.74%
- County results Allard: 40–50% 50–60% 60–70% 70–80% Strickland: 50–60% 60–70%
U.S. senator before election
Hank Brown
Republican
Elected U.S. Senator
Wayne Allard
Republican

The 1996 United States Senate election in Colorado was held on November 5, 1996. Incumbent Republican U.S. Senator Hank Brown decided to retire instead of seeking a second term. Republican Wayne Allard won the open seat.

== Republican primary ==
=== Candidates ===
- Wayne Allard, U.S. representative from Fort Collins
- Gale Norton, Attorney General of Colorado

=== Results ===
Republican primary results
Party	Candidate	Votes	%
Republican	Wayne Allard	115,064	56.83%
Republican	Gale Norton	87,394	43.17%
Total votes		202,458	100.00%

== Democratic primary ==
=== Candidates ===
- Gene Nichol, dean of the University of Colorado Law School
- Tom Strickland, attorney

=== Results ===
Democratic primary results
Party	Candidate	Votes	%
Democratic	Tom Strickland	87,294	66.13%
Democratic	Gene Nichol	44,709	33.87%
Total votes		132,003	100.00%

== General election ==
=== Candidates ===
- Wayne Allard, U.S. representative from Fort Collins (Republican)
- Randy MacKenzie (Natural Law)
- Tom Strickland, attorney (Democratic)

=== Results ===
General election
Party	Candidate	Votes	%	±%
Republican	Wayne Allard	750,315	51.41%	−4.27%
Democratic	Tom Strickland	667,600	45.74%	+4.08%
Natural Law	Randy MacKenzie	41,620	2.85%	
Write-ins		66	<0.01%	
Majority		82,715	5.67%	−8.35%
Turnout		1,459,601		
Republican hold		Swing		

== See also ==
- 1996 United States Senate elections
