= Charles Berry =

Charles Berry may refer to:

- Charles Berry (minister) (1783–1877), English Unitarian and schoolteacher
- Charles H. Berry (1823–1900), Minnesota attorney general and politician
- Charles Albert Berry (1852–1899), English nonconformist divine
- Charlie Berry (second baseman) (1860–1940), American second baseman in Major League Baseball
- Charlie Berry (1902–1972), baseball catcher and umpire, football player, and official
- Charles J. Berry (1923–1945), US Marine and Medal of Honor recipient
  - USS Charles Berry
- Chuck Berry (1926–2017), American musician
- Charles Berry (economist) (1930–2007), American economist
- Charles Roland Berry (born 1957), American composer
- Charles A. Berry (1923–2020), physician of NASA
- Charles W. Berry (1871–1941), American physician, soldier, and New York City comptroller
- Chuck Berry (politician) (born 1950), member of the Colorado House of Representatives
- Charles Berry (rugby union), Scottish rugby union player

== See also ==
- Charles Bury (disambiguation)
- Charles, Duke of Berry (disambiguation)
- Chuck Berry (disambiguation)
