= Leicester Mercury =

English daily newspaper in Leicester

- The Leicester Mercury, June 2010
- Type: Daily newspaper
- Format: Tabloid
- Owner: Reach plc
- Founder: James Thompson
- Staff writers: Thomas Mack, Lee Garrett, Dylan Hayward, Caitlin James, Tess Rushin, Christopher Harper, Samuel Kalantzis, Jasmine Siddon
- Founded: 31 January 1874
- Language: English
- Headquarters: University of Leicester, Leicester
- Circulation: 4,997 (as of 2025)
- Sister newspapers: Nottingham Post, Derby Telegraph
- Website: leicestermercury.co.uk

Leicester Mercury is a British regional newspaper for the city of Leicester and the neighbouring counties of Leicestershire and Rutland. The paper began in the 19th century as Leicester Daily Mercury and later changed to its present title.

== Early history ==
The paper was founded by James Thompson, already proprietor of the Leicester Chronicle which he had merged with the Leicestershire Mercury ten years earlier. The Leicester Daily Mercury was an evening paper, the first to be published in Leicester, and provided support to the Liberal Party in the general election.

The first issue was published on 31 January 1874 from the paper's offices at St Martin's, consisting of four pages of five columns each. The paper cost a halfpenny and was initially published daily, at 3pm and 6pm, except on Fridays, when the presses were busy with the title's sister paper, the Leicestershire Chronicle and Mercury.

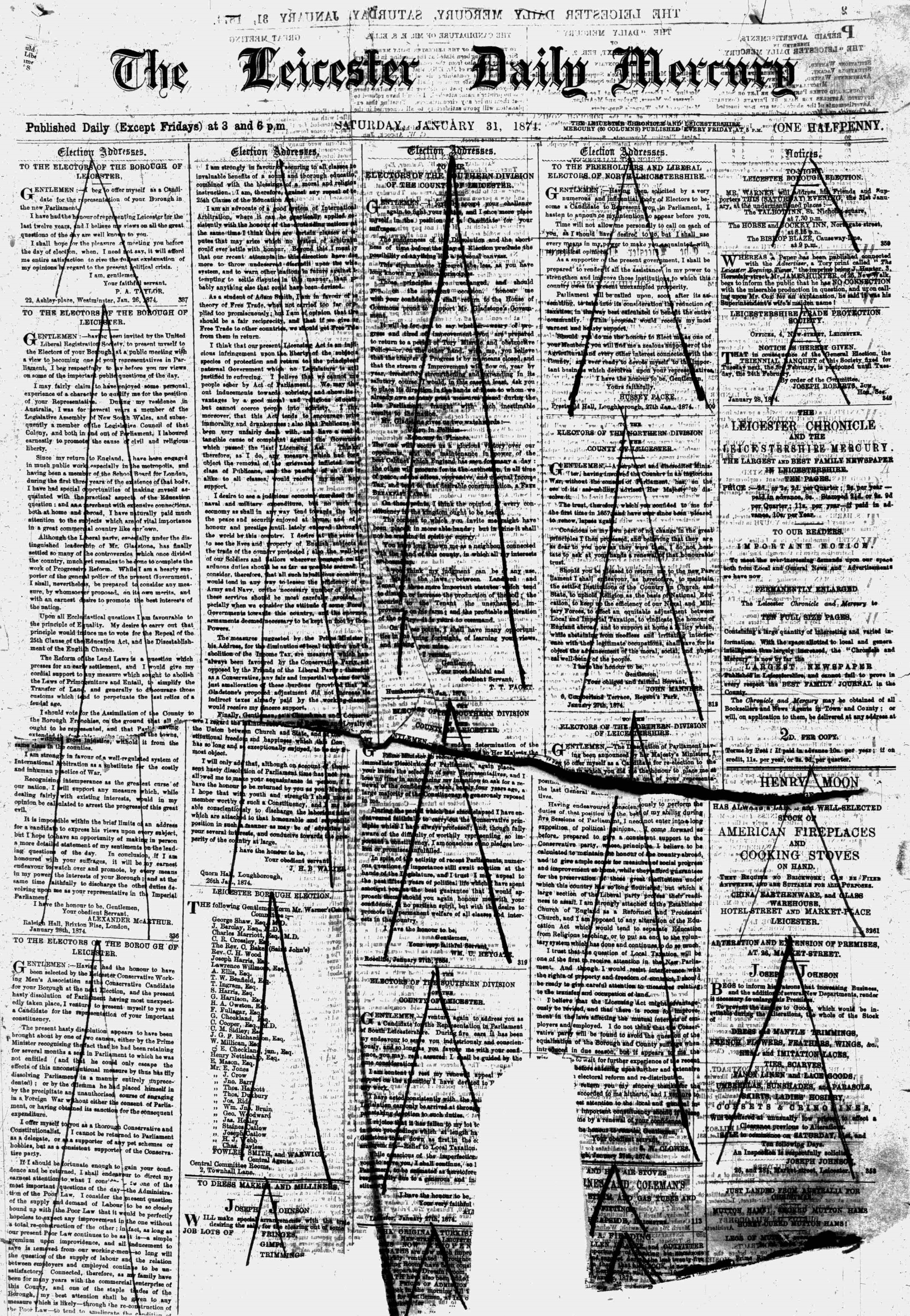
The front page of the very first edition of the Leicester Mercury

The Mercury had a staff of 25—excluding they newsboys, who were said to be so unruly a policeman had to be on hand each afternoon to keep them in order—and a circulation of 5,000.

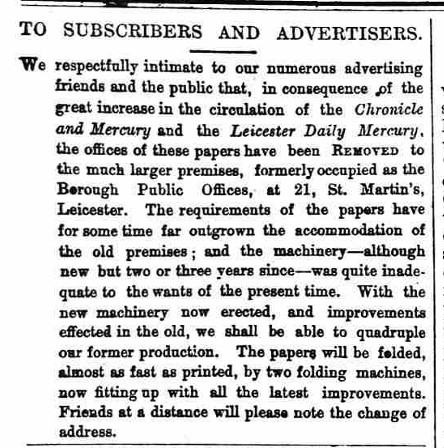
Announcement of new offices for the Leicester Mercury, February 1878

By February 1878, following an increased circulation, Mercury moved to 21, St Martin's, the former Borough Public Offices. A new press was installed, quadrupling production capacity. In 1889, Mercury relocated to an Albion Street building where the paper remained for the next 77 years. The building was bought for £4,900 and was fitted with a fire bell linked to the one at the fire brigade's base in Bowling Green Street. The brigade reserved a seat on their fire engine for a Mercury reporter.

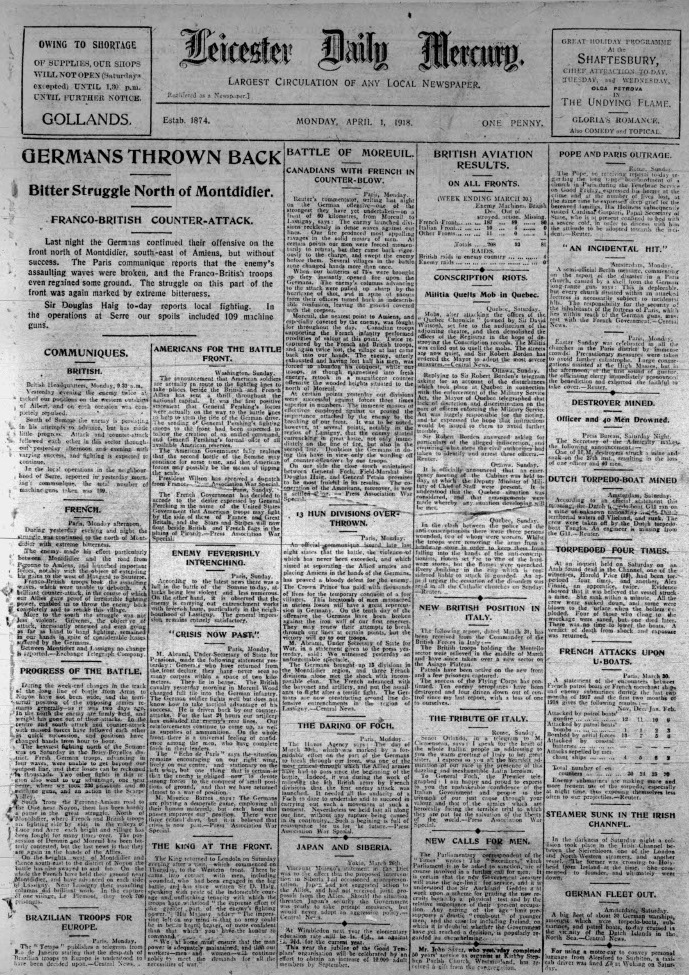
News appears on the front page of the Leicester Mercury for the first time, 1 April 1918

During World War I, owing to newsprint shortages Mercury’s news pages were reduced from eight to six and then four . On 1 April 1918, Mercury replaced the advertisements on the front page to ensure that “news for which all are so naturally looking [was] given in the fullest possible measure."

In 1964, Leicester Evening Mail was merged with the newspaper.

In the summer of 1966, Mercury moved to St. George Street; the offices wrte designed by architect Pick Everard. The newspaper had reporters across district offices in Loughborough, Coalville, Market Harborough, Melton Mowbray, Hinckley, and Rugby. By 1970, the paper reported 180,000 in sales, accounting for almost a quarter of the Leicestershire population at the time.

== Recent history ==
The Mercury celebrated its 125th anniversary in 1999 with a series of events including a royal visit to St George Street by the Duke of Edinburgh. Two years later, the newspaper received the Regional Newspaper of the Year award after a redesign and relaunch.

The paper sold an average 69,069 copies per day in the first half of 2008, down from 73,634 per day the previous year. This represented a 5.7% year-on-year decline and a 47% drop compared to the 139,357 copies sold in the equivalent period for 1989.

In 2006, the paper discontinued its localised weekday editions for Loughborough, Hinckley, North West Leicestershire, Melton Mowbray and Market Harborough, replacing them with two general editions covering east and west Leicestershire. The paper maintained two daily editions for Leicester, retaining staff in each market town while reducing editorial staff in other areas through non-replacement of departing employees.

In December 2006, 79% of the Mercury's workforce voted for National Union of Journalists recognition, making the paper the second Northcliffe Newspapers chapel to secure union representation.

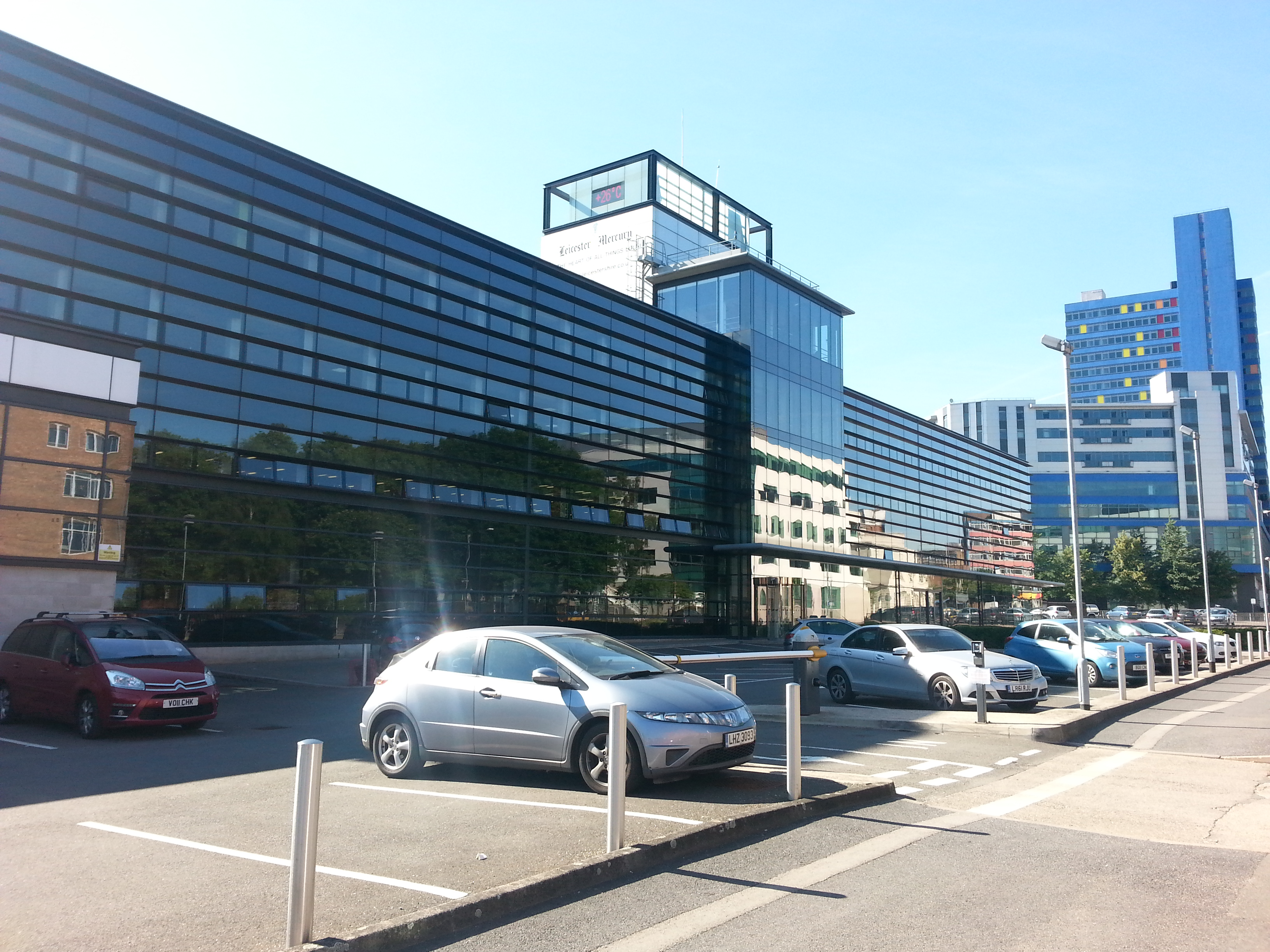
The Leicester Mercury's headquarters in St George Street, pictured in 2013

The newspaper's headquarters underwent an external renovation in 2006 at a reported cost of £12.5m.

The paper had 97 editorial members of staff in 2007 and the newspaper was the sixth largest-selling regional title in England in 2009. But between 2008-2009 and 2012, Northcliffe cut the staff numbers from 4,200 to 2,200.

In 2009, Northcliffe created a number of regional 'subbing hubs', and production work for Mercury was transferred to a hub in Nottingham that also handled work for the Nottingham Post and the Derby Telegraph, with at least 30 jobs lost at the three titles. In the same year, Northcliffe's sister company Harmsworth Press closed the printing plant at the Mercury and laid off all employees.

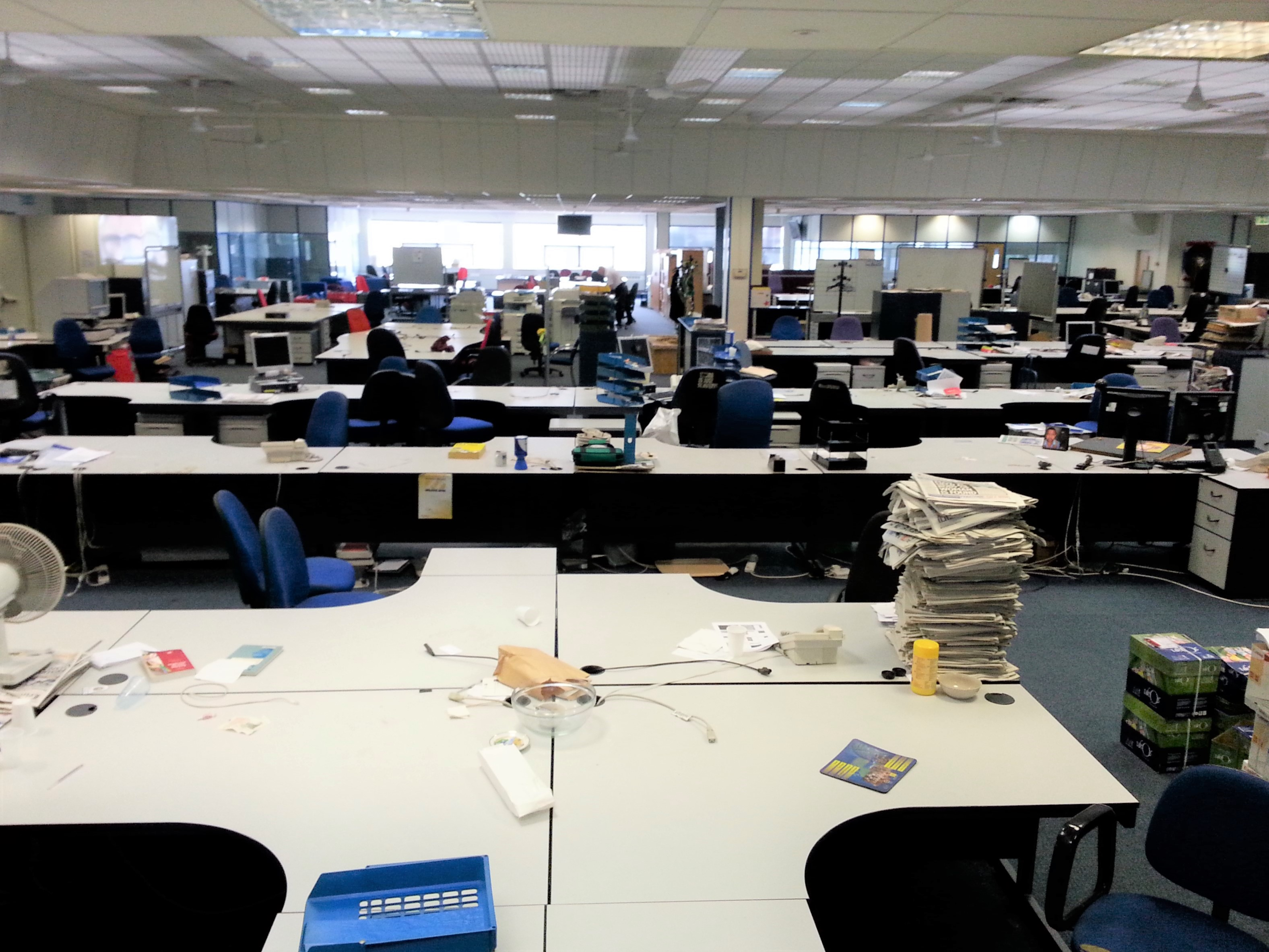
The empty Mercury newsroom in 2013, after journalists moved to the second floor, along with the rest of the paper's staff

Eleven editorial jobs were lost in 2012, with the NUJ sending an open letter protesting against "wave after wave of swingeing cuts". Later that year, Local World acquired the Mercury's parent company Northcliffe Media from Daily Mail and General Trust. Mercury, which had previously occupied all three floors of the St George Street building, retreated to a single floor.

Trinity Mirror, which rebranded as Reach plc in 2018, purchased Mercury in 2015. Several staff photographers were laid off in 2016. Later that year, the paper's features department, which had dominated the regional press awards for a decade, was axed. In 2017, half a century after moving in to St George Street, and just a few years after the renovation of the offices, the Mercury moved out of their headquarters to smaller offices in New Walk.

At the start of the COVID pandemic, staff began working remotely. Reach plc announced the closure of the New Walk offices in 2021, as part of a shift to working from home for staff on titles across the country. In 2022, the Mercury found a new base in the Astley Clarke building on the University of Leicester campus.

== Organization ==
The digital operations of Mercury are managed through Reach plc's Nottingham production hub with a team of local journalists covering Leicester and Leicestershire news. In 2021, Reach plc implemented a "Live" newsroom model across its regional titles, including LeicestershireLive, introducing specialized digital roles such as audience editors, social media producers, and SEO specialists. As of 2025, the LeicestershireLive editorial team consists of approximately 15 journalists, including a digital editor and multimedia content creators.

=== Editors of the Leicester Mercury ===
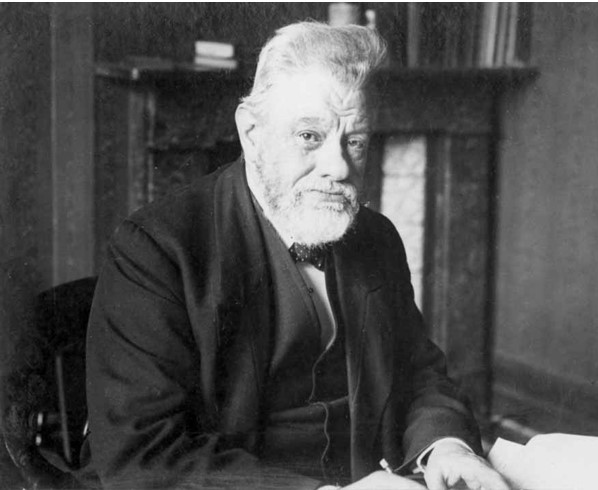
Harry Hackett

- James Thompson (1874–1877)
- Francis Hewitt (1877–1882)
- Harry Hackett (1882–1923)
- Reginald Gittoes-Davies (1923–1926)
- Henry Bourne (1926–1948)
- John Fortune (1948–1970)
- Brian West (1970–1974)
- Neville Stack (1974–1987)
- Alex Leys (1987–1993)
- Nick Carter (1993–2009)
- Keith Perch (2009–2011)
- Richard Bettsworth (2011–2014)
- Kevin Booth (2014–2016)
- George Oliver (2016–2020)
- Adam Moss (2020–2023)
- Linda Steelyard (2023–2025)

=== Football correspondents ===
A relatively small number of sport journalists have performed reported on football at Mercury. Early correspondents wrote under a pen name—“Old Fossil”, “Hampden”, and “Blue Don”—or had no byline at all. Simon Dee was the first correspondent to be named, followed by Jimmy Martin, Bill Anderson, Steve Pumfrey, Rob Tanner, James Sharpe, and Jordan Blackwell.

=== Notable former journalists ===
- Richard Clements, former editor of Tribune
- Dani Garavelli, Scottish journalist and columnist for The Herald.
- Michael Green, humorist, and author of books including The Art of Coarse Rugby and The Boy Who Shot Down an Airship
- David Hands, rugby correspondent for The Times (1982–2010).
- John Harris, Baron Harris of Greenwich, politician
- David Icke, conspiracy theorist
- Martin Johnson, English sports journalist at The Independent, Daily Telegraph, and Sunday Times
- Jim Mapham, photographer with No 5 Army Film and Photographic Unit and D-Day veteran
- Richard Wallace, former editor of the Daily Mirror

=== Current journalists ===
- Tom Mack, senior reporter, previously reported on the 2018 Leicester explosion and the 2014 murder of Rania Alayed.
- Caitlin James, local democracy reporter covering Leicester City Council for several media partners including Mercury, and BBC.
- Dylan Hayward, reporter covering crime, governance, education, health, environment and housing.
- Lee Garrett, content editor reporting on crime and courts, previously covered the 2020 trial of Dylan West and the 2024 Bhim Kohli murder trial.
- Tess Rushin, local democracy reporter covering several district counsels including Leicestershire County Council.
- Christopher Harper, local democracy reporter covering Leicestershire County Council and Hinckley and Bosworth borough council.

== Content ==
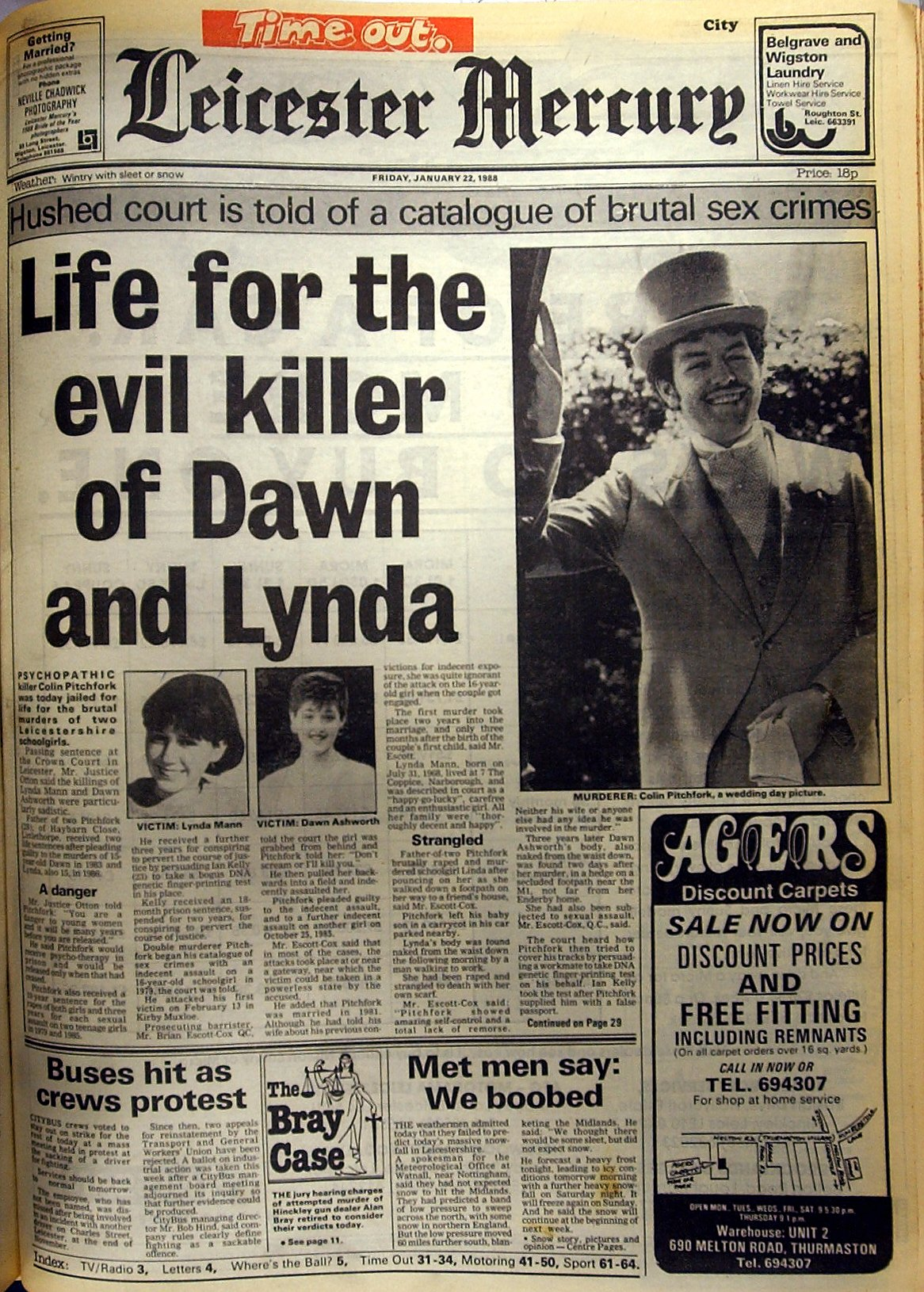
The Leicester Mercury's coverage of the sentencing of child murderer Colin Pitchfork

Mercury has reported on numerous local and national events for 150 years, including the murders of Leicestershire schoolgirls Lynda Mann and Dawn Ashworth by Colin Pitchfork, and the first-ever conviction using DNA fingerprinting. The paper also covered the disappearance of Madeleine McCann, Leicester City's 2016 Premier League victory, and the discovery and reburial of the remains of King Richard III in 2015. In 2018, it reported on the drowning of six-year-old Khai Satkunarajah in the River Soar. It’s 2019 "Save Our Venues" campaign covered Leicester's independent music venues.

In 2023, the Mercury’s "Tower of Horrors" series reported on the living conditions in Leicester's tower blocks. The paper reported extensively on the 2024 killing of 80-year-old Bhim Kohli in Franklin Park, Braunstone Town, detailing the attack, family response, court case and community reaction. The reporting was later shortlisted for Investigation of the year at the 2026 Society of Editors Media of Freedom Awards.

Other notable stories have included the Green Bicycle Case, Lamborne Road siege, Imperial Typewriters strike, Gartree Prison helicopter escape, IRA bomb attack in Leicester, Kegworth air disaster, CJD-related deaths in Queniborough, and Leicester City FC title-winning season.

LeicesterLive’s covers multicultural events such as the Leicester Caribbean Carnival, Diwali celebrations, and Leicester Pride. It also reports on local traditions, such as Melton Mowbray's VE Day events with Spitfire fly-pastsThe coverage often includes video reports, photo galleries and interactive content.

LeicestershireLive introduced a digital content management system in 2019 for faster publication and improved audience analytics. During Leicester City Football Club's 2016 Premier League victory, the platform published match updates, videos, and reader reactions, recording over 500,000 page views in one day.

== Online platforms ==
=== Website ===
Mercury first launched a website in 1996, entitled Gateway to Leicestershire which allowed businesses, services and tourist centres and the general public to learn more about Leicestershire county. In April 1998, Gateway to Leicestershire joined the Northcliffe's thisis network of websites. The website was updated twice a day with local news from the Mercury and national and sports news and sport from the Leicester-based wire service Quicksilver Media. It also featured reviews and a bulletin board for users.

After the acquisition of Northcliffe titles by Local World in 2012, the thisis network was phased out. Mercury launched a new website in 2013.

Mercury was acquired by Reach plc’s Trinity Mirror in 2015, and re-launched as LeicestershireLive in February 2018 as part of Reach plc's regional digital expansion. LeicestershireLive became the primary publishing channel for the newspaper with print circulation decreasing from ~25,000 in 2015 to 4,997 daily copies in 2025 and online readership increasing to 4.2 million monthly page views by 2024.

In 2026, the website introduced “LeicestershireLive Premium”, a gated paywall to select stories, along with a metered paywall to non-subscribers. It also developed location-based advertising capabilities to allow local businesses to target specific Leicester neighbourhoods and demographics.

=== Applications ===
In 2022, LeicestershireLive launched a redesigned mobile application with personalized news feeds and location-based content options. The platform uses push notifications for mobile users.

== Other publications ==
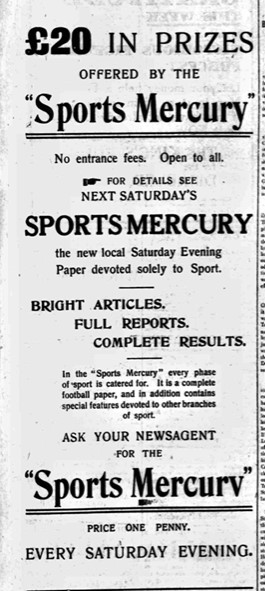
Sports Mercury advert in the Leicester Daily Post, 16 January 1919

=== Leicester Chronicle ===
The publication was first introduced in 1810 as a broadsheet, later evolving into a tabloid-format Illustrated Leicester Chronicle with an emphasis on news in pictures. The name was shorted to the Illustrated Chronicle, then reverted to The Chronicle. In 1815, it reported on the Battle of Waterloo reaching Leicester. The publication was discontinued in August 1979.

Mercury revived the name for a monthly nostalgia supplement called the Leicestershire Chronicle, which launched in the late 2000s. It was nominated for Supplement of the Year at the 2008 Regional Press Awards, but ceased publication in the early 2010s.

=== Sports Mercury ===
In 1919, Mercury launched the Saturday evening Sports Mercury results paper, popularly known as Buff. The publication closed in 2005, owing to a lack of sales, new ABC rules that no longer permitted the inclusion of the sport paper's sales within parent papers' circulation figures, and the demise of the traditional Saturday kick-off time of 3pm. The-then Mercury editor Nick Carter said: "Quite simply, not enough people want to go out and buy a results edition after 5.30pm on Saturdays to make the Buff viable. We have little option but to shut it down."

=== Sporting Green ===
A Saturday morning sports paper, the 32-page Sporting Green, was introduced in 1991. In 1996, the name was changed to Sporting Blue, with newsprint to match the shirt colour of Leicester City. Following the closure of Buff, Mercury relaunched the morning paper with blue and green newsprint with tête-bêche binding to emphasise support for both Leicester City and Leicester Tigers.

=== The Week ===
After audience research showed that readers wanted more entertainment and events content, Mercury launched The Week in 1994 to serve as a what's-on guide for Leicestershire. Initially printed on Fridays, it later became a Thursday publication. The Week was relaunched in 2012 as Weekend as part of the Mercury's Saturday edition.

=== The Leicester WAVE ===
From January 2010 to September 2011, the Mercury published a youth supplement called The Leicester WAVE on the last Wednesday of each month. People under the age of 25 wrote the content, examining how Mercury stories affected young people.

=== More Mercury ===
In 2011, the Mercury revamped its Saturday paper edition, adding a new features supplement called More Mercury, alongside the leisure supplement, Weekend, to the existing property supplement. It raised the cover price to 60p, which was 20p more than the weekday price. Then-editor Richard Bettsworth told readers: "What we do not want to do is endlessly slash costs in order to sustain our business, with the resulting loss of quality. Doing so is a downward spiral. So, More magazine and the newlook weekend Mercury, is not remotely about ripping people off or trying to make a fast buck. It is a reflection of our ongoing commitment as a newspaper and as a business to providing a robust news service to Leicestershire, both now and in the future."

More Mercury was recognised as Supplement of the Year at the Regional Press Awards in 2013. The publication was discontinued in 2016, after Mercury's features team were made redundant.

== Controversies ==
The demographics of Leicester changed significantly in the post-war years, and Mercury chronicled the rise in multiculturalism. The paper also garnered a reputation for racism. In Negotiating Boundaries in the City: Migration, Ethnicity, and Gender in Britain, Joanne Herbert noted: "From 1945 to 1962 l, the Leicester Mercury gave tacit support to Cyril Osborne, an Enoch Powell sympathiser who campaigned relentlessly against immigration and overall, articles were framed by a consciousness of the empire in which South Africa was presented as an acceptable model."

But by the 1990s and 2000s, there had been a significant change in editorial principles. Following the unrest in Bradford and Oldham in 2001, a Leicester City Council report noted that Mercury consistently presented a “balanced view of community relations." A House of Commons report in 2004, praised the "drive and commitment" of Mercury for recognising the paper’s role in building a cohesive community.”

== Awards and nominations ==
=== Society of Editors, Media Freedom Awards 2026 ===
- Shortlisted for Investigation of the year - regional, Dylan Hayward

=== Midlands Media Awards 2025 ===
- Dylan Hayward, Digital journalist of the year, Newcomer of the year, Presidents Award

=== Newsawards 2015 ===
- Regional Daily Newspaper of the Year.

=== Regional Press Awards 2015 ===
- Lee Marlow, Feature Writer of the Year
- Fred Leicester, Columnist of the Year

=== Midlands Media Awards 2014 ===
- Mike Sewell, Sports Photographer of the Year

=== The Regional Press Awards 2013 ===
- Lee Marlow, Feature Writer of the Year
- Will Johnston, Daily/Sunday Photographer of the Year
- More Mercury, Supplement of the Year

=== Regional Press Awards 2012 ===
- Adam Wakelin, Feature Writer of the Year

=== Regional Press Awards 2011 ===
- Adam Wakelin, Feature Writer of the Year

=== Midlands Media Awards 2011 ===
- Mike Sewell, Sports Photographer of the Year

=== Midlands Media Awards 2010 ===
- Mike Sewell, Sports Photographer of the Year
- Adam Wakelin, Columnist of the Year
- Gemma Peplow, Community Campaign of the Year

=== Regional Press Awards 2009 ===
- Lee Marlow, Feature Writer of the Year

=== Regional Press Awards 2006 ===
- Jeremy Clay, Feature Writer of the Year

=== Banks’s Midlands Press Photographer Awards 2003 ===
- Max Ewen, Banks's Press Photographer of the Year
- Emily Barber, Banks's Young Photographer of the Year
- Max Ewen, Banks's Best News Picture
- Mike Sewell, joint winner Banks's Best Queen's Golden Jubilee Picture

=== Banks’s Midlands Press Photographer Awards 2002 ===
- Alistair Langham, Sports Photographer of the Year

=== Banks’s Midlands Press Photographer Awards 2001 ===
- Jason Senior, Sports Photographer of the Year

=== Newspaper Society Awards, 2001 ===
- Regional Newspaper of the Year
