= Frank McNulty (Colorado politician) =

American politician (born 1973)

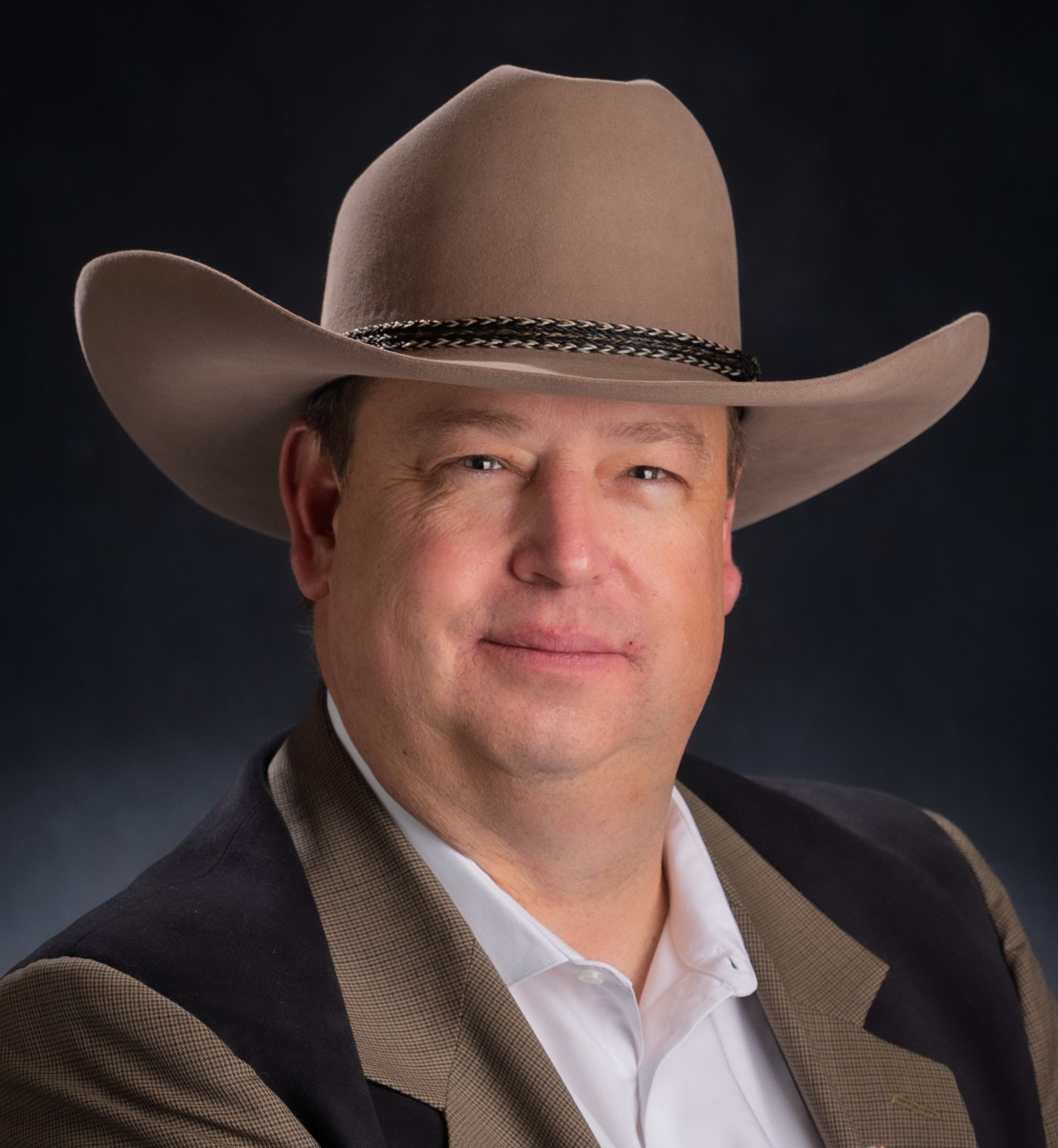

Member of the University of Colorado Board of Regents from the 4th district
- Incumbent
- Assumed office January 5, 2023
- Preceded by: Sue Sharkey

Speaker of the Colorado House of Representatives
- In office January 12, 2011 – January 9, 2013
- Preceded by: Terrance Carroll
- Succeeded by: Mark Ferrandino

Member of the Colorado House of Representatives from the 43rd district
- In office January 3, 2007 – January 7, 2015
- Preceded by: Ted Harvey
- Succeeded by: Kevin Van Winkle

Personal details
- Born: February 2, 1973 (age 53) Blue Island, Illinois, U.S.
- Party: Republican
- Spouse: Kim Hall
- Education: University of Colorado, Boulder (BA); University of Denver (JD)

Frank McNulty (born February 2, 1973) is an American politician who serves on the University of Colorado Board of Regents from the 4th district. Prior to this he was a member of the Colorado House of Representatives from 2007 to 2015, where he served as speaker from 2011 to 2013.

== Early life ==
Frank McNulty was born in Blue Island, Illinois, on February 2, 1973, to Frank and Denise McNulty. He has lived in Colorado since 1977, and was raised in Jefferson County, Colorado, where he graduated from J.K. Mullen High School. In 1995, he graduated from the University of Colorado Boulder with a bachelor's degree.

After graduating from college McNulty worked for U.S. Senator Wayne Allard. He returned in 1998 in order to attend the University of Denver and graduated with a Juris Doctor degree in 2001. A public policy advisor, he joined Governor Bill Owens' administration in 2000, and was assistant director for water for the Colorado Department of Natural Resources.

== Colorado House of Representatives ==
In 2006, McNulty won the Republican nomination for a seat in the Colorado House of Representatives from the 43rd district without opposition and defeated Democratic nominee Allen A. Dreher in the general election. He was reelected in 2008, 2010, and 2012.

During McNulty's tenure in the state house he served on the Agriculture committee. In 2008, McNulty was a member of a committee that investigated Douglas Bruce to determine if the state house could punish Bruce for actions he did before taking office and what actions should be taken against him. The Republicans gained control of the state house after the 2010 elections and selected McNulty to be speaker; he is the most recent Republican to be speaker. McNulty declined to seek a leadership position after the Republicans lost their majority in the 2012 elections and Mark Waller was selected to serve as minority leader.

During the 2010 Colorado gubernatorial election McNulty was a member of a draft movement trying to get Josh Penry to seek the Republican nomination. He endorsed Mitt Romney during the 2012 Republican presidential primaries.

== Later life ==
McNulty was a member of Jeb Bush's steering committee in Colorado during the 2016 Republican presidential primaries. McNulty was the director of the Public Trust Institute, which filed ethics complaints against Governor John Hickenlooper. In 2019, he co-chaired Preserve Colorado's Electoral Vote with Jack Graham in opposition to Colorado joining the National Popular Vote Interstate Compact. He was a lobbyist for Centennial Institute, a conservative think tank at Colorado Christian University. McNulty was elected to the University of Colorado Board of Regents from the 4th district in the 2022 election.

== Personal life ==
McNulty married Kim Hall, with whom he had two children. They first met while working for Allard.

== Political positions ==
In 2007, McNulty proposed legislation to place the minimum mandatory sentencing at 15 years for people convicted of sexual offenses against children under 15. He proposed legislation to require proof of citizenship in order to vote. Civil unions for same-sex couples was opposed by McNulty. He opposes the legalization of cannabis. McNulty supports Israel and opposed peace negotiations for the Israeli–Palestinian conflict in 2016. The AFL-CIO gave McNulty a rating of 47% in 2011.

== Electoral history ==
2006 Colorado House of Representatives 43rd district election
Primary election
| Party | Candidate | Votes | % |
|---|---|---|---|
| Republican | Frank McNulty | 4,070 | 100.00% |
| Total votes | | 4,070 | 100.00% |
General election
| Republican | Frank McNulty | 14,813 | 61.27% |
| Democratic | Allen A. Dreher | 9,362 | 38.73% |
| Total votes | | 24,175 | 100.00% |

2008 Colorado House of Representatives 43rd district election
Primary election
| Party | Candidate | Votes | % |
|---|---|---|---|
| Republican | Frank McNulty (incumbent) | 6,729 | 100.00% |
| Total votes | | 6,729 | 100.00% |
General election
| Republican | Frank McNulty (incumbent) | 27,366 | 63.33% |
| Democratic | John Stevens | 15,846 | 36.67% |
| Total votes | | 43,212 | 100.00% |

2010 Colorado House of Representatives 43rd district election
Primary election
| Party | Candidate | Votes | % |
|---|---|---|---|
| Republican | Frank McNulty (incumbent) | 7,682 | 100.00% |
| Total votes | | 7,682 | 100.00% |
General election
| Republican | Frank McNulty (incumbent) | 22,416 | 67.14% |
| Democratic | Gary R. Semro | 10,973 | 32.86% |
| Total votes | | 33,389 | 100.00% |

2012 Colorado House of Representatives 43rd district election
Primary election
| Party | Candidate | Votes | % |
|---|---|---|---|
| Republican | Frank McNulty (incumbent) | 4,718 | 100.00% |
| Total votes | | 4,718 | 100.00% |
General election
| Republican | Frank McNulty (incumbent) | 25,814 | 62.29% |
| Democratic | Gary R. Semro | 15,625 | 37.71% |
| Total votes | | 41,439 | 100.00% |

2022 Regent of the University of Colorado 4th district district election
Primary election
| Party | Candidate | Votes | % |
|---|---|---|---|
| Republican | Frank McNulty | 97,057 | 100.00% |
| Total votes | | 97,057 | 100.00% |
General election
| Republican | Frank McNulty | 217,975 | 63.96% |
| Democratic | Jack Barrington | 122,805 | 36.04% |
| Total votes | | 340,780 | 100.00% |

== Works cited ==
=== Books ===
- Presidents and Speakers of the Colorado General Assembly: A Biographical Portrait from 1876 (PDF). Colorado General Assembly. 2016.

=== Election reports ===
- "Official Publication of the Abstract of Votes Cast for the 2005 Coordinated, 2006 Primary, 2006 General" (PDF). Colorado General Assembly. 2006. Archived (PDF) from the original on April 10, 2025.
- "Official Publication of the Abstract of Votes Cast for the 2008 Primary 2008 General" (PDF). Colorado General Assembly. 2008. Archived (PDF) from the original on April 14, 2025.
- "2010 Abstract of Votes Cast" (PDF). Colorado General Assembly. 2010. Archived (PDF) from the original on May 11, 2025.
- "2012 Abstract of Votes Cast" (PDF). Colorado General Assembly. 2012. Archived (PDF) from the original on April 14, 2025.
- "2022 Abstract of Votes Cast" (PDF). Colorado General Assembly. 2022. Archived (PDF) from the original on March 31, 2025.

=== News ===
- "Frank McNulty". The Denver Post. October 19, 2006. Archived from the original on May 27, 2025.
- Frank, John (June 5, 2020). "John Hickenlooper violated Colorado's gift ban, state ethics commission rules". The Colorado Sun. Archived from the original on March 17, 2025.
- Hilley, Justin (July 21, 2011). "Three lawmakers running for Congress get perfect marks from state AFL-CIO". The Denver Post. Archived from the original on May 27, 2025.
- Luning, Ernst (September 11, 2015). "Jeb! names Owens, Stapleton as chairs". Colorado Politics. Archived from the original on May 27, 2025.
- Luning, Ernst (February 13, 2012). "Presidential campaigns leave mark in Colorado". Colorado Politics. Archived from the original on May 27, 2025.
- McGhee, Tom (April 27, 2016). "Supporters of Israel rally, decry peace efforts". The Denver Post. Archived from the original on May 27, 2025.
- McKibbin, Mike (January 18, 2017). "McNulty lobbying firm chosen by CCU think tank". Colorado Politics. Archived from the original on May 27, 2025.
- Njegomir, Dan (April 16, 2018). "Q&A with Frank McNulty: Reliving the House GOP's shining moment". Colorado Politics. Archived from the original on May 24, 2025.
- Strogoff, Jody (November 15, 2012). "Changing of the guard — House Republicans now the minority party at state legislature". Colorado Politics. Archived from the original on May 27, 2025.
- Tomasic, John (January 27, 2017). "As states rush to legalize weed, Colorado still at it five years later". Colorado Politics. Archived from the original on May 27, 2025.

=== Newspapers ===
- "Complaint says Hickenlooper didn't report flights paid by others as gifts". Fort Collins Coloradoan. October 13, 2018. p. 2A – via Newspapers.com.
- "GOP lawmakers want further crackdown on illegal immigration". Fort Collins Coloradoan. October 31, 2007. p. A8 – via Newspapers.com.
- "Other Bills Affecting Sex Offenders This Session". The Daily Sentinel. January 30, 2007. p. 1A – via Newspapers.com.
- Anderson, Emily (June 6, 2009). "Penry, McInnis dominate straw polls for governor". The Daily Sentinel. p. 2A – via Newspapers.com.
- Ashby, Charles (December 1, 2012). "Legislators learn committee assignments". The Daily Sentinel. p. 3A – via Newspapers.com.
- Ashby, Charles (November 5, 2010). "Legislators pick leaders; no West Slopers". The Daily Sentinel. p. 3A – via Newspapers.com.
- Coltrain, Nick (April 26, 2019). "Effort to skirt electoral college gets pushback with help from Graham". Fort Collins Coloradoan. p. 2A – via Newspapers.com.
- Barge, Chris (January 16, 2008). "Kick could leave Legislaure 'de-Bruced'". The Daily Sentinel. p. 3A – via Newspapers.com.
- Moreno, Ivan (January 10, 2012). "Civil union efforts in limbo". Fort Collins Coloradoan. p. A5 – via Newspapers.com.

=== Web ===
- "Current Regents: Frank McNulty". University of Colorado. Archived from the original on May 24, 2025.
- "Meet Frank". Frank McNulty. Archived from the original on July 24, 2008.

Political offices
| Preceded by Terrance Carroll | Speaker of the Colorado House of Representatives; 2011–2013 | Succeeded by Mark Ferrandino |
