= Ruben A. Valdez =

American politician (1937–2019)

46th Speaker of the Colorado House of Representatives
- In office January 7, 1975 – January 5, 1977
- Preceded by: John Fuhr
- Succeeded by: Ronald H. Strahle

Member of the Colorado House of Representatives
- In office 1971 – January 3, 1979
- Preceded by: Ben Klein
- Succeeded by: Federico Peña
- Constituency: 2nd district (1971–1973); 5th district (1973–1979)

Personal details
- Born: Ruben Adolfo Valdez; January 27, 1937 Trinidad, Colorado, U.S.
- Died: October 1, 2019 (aged 82)
- Party: Democratic
- Spouse: Virginia Segura
- Children: 3
- Education: Loretto Heights University

Ruben Adolfo Valdez (January 27, 1937 – October 1, 2019) was an American politician who served in the Colorado House of Representatives from 1971 to 1979, and as its Speaker from 1975 to 1976.

Born in Trinidad, Colorado, Valdez dropped out of high school due to his family's poor financial situation and worked in a brickyard. He was a member of the United Steelworkers and served as shop steward and president for his locals. After earning a General Educational Development he studied at Red Rocks Community College and Loretto Heights University.

Valdez was elected to the state house in 1970, and served as chair of the Democratic caucus, speaker, and minority leader during his tenure. He was a delegate to the 1976 and 1984 Democratic National Conventions. After a failed campaign for lieutenant governor in 1978, he was appointed to a position in the United States Department of Transportation by President Jimmy Carter and as director of the Social Services and Labor and Employment departments by Governor Richard Lamm.

== Early life and education ==
Ruben Adolfo Valdez was born in Trinidad, Colorado, on January 27, 1937, to Antonio and Delicia Valdez as the youngest of nine children. His father, a coal miner, died when Ruben was nine and his family's financial situation made him drop out of Centennial High School in the 9th grade at age 15 to work at a brick yard in Pueblo, Colorado. His mother died in 1961.

After moving to California at age 19, he became a member of the United Steelworkers and was elected shop steward. He returned to Colorado in 1960, and later became president of the Steelworkers Local 5099. From 1971 to 1978, Valdez worked for the Denver government as a community relations consultant. He received his high school diploma through General Educational Development, studied business administration and personnel management at Red Rocks Community College, and graduated with a Bachelor of Arts degree in political science from Loretto Heights University in 1975.

== Colorado House of Representatives ==
Ben Klein, a six-term member of the Colorado House of Representatives from the 2nd district, chose to seek election to the Colorado Senate in 1970. Valdez won the Democratic nomination and defeated Republican nominee James Maestas and Raza Unida nominee Brian Sanchez. He defeated Republican nominees Silas Valdez in 1972, Helen Montoya in 1974, and Kenny Plumb in 1976.

On November 18, 1972, Valdez was selected as caucus chair. The Democrats gained control of the state house in 1974, and he defeated Charles DeMoulin in a 29 to 10 vote on November 21, 1974, to become speaker. He was the first Hispanic to serve as speaker and another one would not serve as speaker until Crisanta Duran in 2017. The Eagleton Institute of Politics named him as one of 50 outstanding state legislators in 1974. Valdez was an uncommitted delegate to the 1976 Democratic National Convention, but came to support Jerry Brown. After the Democrats lost their majority in the 1976 election Valdez defeated Bob Leon Kirscht to become minority leader on November 13.

Governor Richard Lamm considered appointing Valdez as Colorado State Treasurer in 1977, but Valdez declined the offer. On November 22, 1977, he announced that he would seek the Democratic nomination for lieutenant governor in 1978, but lost to Nancy Dick, the only other candidate to receive enough support at the convention to appear on the ballot. Kirscht was selected to succeed Valdez as minority leader.

== Later life ==
President Jimmy Carter appointed Valdez as secretarial representative for the United States Department of Transportation's Region VIII in December 1978. Lamm appointed him as executive director of the Colorado Department of Social Services on October 11, 1979, to replace Armando Atencio and assumed his duties on November 1. He was moved from director of the Department of Social Services to director of the Department of Labor and Employment on December 1, 1982, but Lamm later placed Social Services under Valdez's control on October 2, 1985.

In 1981, Lamm appointed Valdez to the commission overseeing redistricting, using his power to select 3 of its 11 members. He was a delegate to the 1984 Democratic National Convention, where he served on the platform committee, and supported Ross Perot during the 1992 presidential election. Valdez earned $134,593 as a lobbyist, making him the highest earning one, in 1995, with $19,550 coming from Philip Morris International, and $18,000 from Thornton, Colorado.

== Personal life ==
On February 2, 1956, Valdez married Virginia Segura, with whom he had three children before her death in 1999. Valdez died on October 1, 2019.

== Political positions ==
Valdez was critical of the Denver Election Commission instituting a $0.50 fee on copies of voter registration certificates in 1972, stating that it was a poll tax. He was critical of redistricting in 1972, stating that Chicano political power was being split. Legislation to legalize marijuana was opposed by Valdez in 1973. Valdez was among 11 Democrats in the house who opposed the usage of state funds for the 1976 Winter Olympics citing the state's financial problems.

In Trinidad, Valdez worked as an interpreter for children who were unable to speak English and pushed for legislation to create bilingual education, which was signed into law on June 30, 1975. He was critical of the Colorado Education Department for not approving funds for bilingual and bicultural programs in 1976.

== Electoral history ==
1970 Colorado House of Representatives 2nd district election
Primary election
| Party | Candidate | Votes | % |
|---|---|---|---|
| Democratic | Ruben Valdez | 1,328 | 54.81% |
| Democratic | Jerry Bohn | 1,095 | 45.19% |
| Total votes | | 2,423 | 100.00% |
General election
| Democratic | Ruben Valdez | 3,689 | 59.72% |
| Republican | James Maestas | 1,988 | 32.18% |
| Raza Unida | Brian Sanchez | 501 | 8.10% |
| Total votes | | 6,178 | 100.00% |

1972 Colorado House of Representatives 5th district election
Primary election
| Party | Candidate | Votes | % |
|---|---|---|---|
| Democratic | Ruben Valdez (incumbent) | 1,395 | 100.00% |
| Total votes | | 1,395 | 100.00% |
General election
| Democratic | Ruben Valdez (incumbent) | 4,931 | 71.63% |
| Republican | Silas Valdez | 1,953 | 28.37% |
| Total votes | | 6,884 | 100.00% |

1974 Colorado House of Representatives 5th district election
Primary election
| Party | Candidate | Votes | % |
|---|---|---|---|
| Democratic | Ruben Valdez (incumbent) | 2,166 | 100.00% |
| Total votes | | 2,166 | 100.00% |
General election
| Democratic | Ruben Valdez (incumbent) | 4,401 | 69.20% |
| Republican | Helen L. Montoya | 1,959 | 30.80% |
| Total votes | | 6,360 | 100.00% |

1976 Colorado House of Representatives 5th district election
Primary election
| Party | Candidate | Votes | % |
|---|---|---|---|
| Democratic | Ruben Valdez (incumbent) | 812 | 100.00% |
| Total votes | | 812 | 100.00% |
General election
| Democratic | Ruben Valdez (incumbent) | 4,926 | 73.79% |
| Republican | Plumb | 1,750 | 26.21% |
| Total votes | | 6,676 | 100.00% |

1978 Colorado Lieutenant Governor election
| Party | Candidate | Votes | % |
|---|---|---|---|
| Democratic | Nancy Dick | 59,256 | 53.07% |
| Democratic | Ruben Valdez | 52,389 | 46.92% |
| Democratic | George W. Crottie (write-in) | 13 | 0.01% |
| Total votes | | 111,658 | 100.00% |

== Works cited ==
=== Books ===
- Presidents and Speakers of the Colorado General Assembly: A Biographical Portrait from 1876 (PDF). Colorado General Assembly. 2016.

=== Election reports ===
- "1970 State Representative General Election". Secretary of State of Colorado. Archived from the original on March 23, 2025.
- "1970 State Representative Democratic Primary". Secretary of State of Colorado. Archived from the original on March 23, 2025.
- "1972 State Representative General Election". Secretary of State of Colorado. Archived from the original on March 23, 2025.
- "1972 State Representative Democratic Primary". Secretary of State of Colorado. Archived from the original on March 23, 2025.
- "1974 State Representative General Election". Secretary of State of Colorado. Archived from the original on March 23, 2025.
- "1974 State Representative Democratic Primary". Secretary of State of Colorado. Archived from the original on March 23, 2025.
- "1976 State Representative General Election". Secretary of State of Colorado. Archived from the original on March 23, 2025.
- "1976 State Representative Democratic Primary". Secretary of State of Colorado. Archived from the original on March 23, 2025.
- "1978 Lieutenant Governor Democratic Primary". Secretary of State of Colorado. Archived from the original on March 23, 2025.

=== News ===
- "Honoring Colorado's first Hispanic House Speaker". KMGH-TV. September 20, 2015. Archived from the original on March 23, 2025.
- Burness, Alex (October 2, 2019). ""A statesman and a trailblazer": Ruben Valdez, Colorado's first Latino House speaker, dead at 82". The Denver Post. Archived from the original on March 23, 2025.
- Goodland, Marianne (October 2, 2019). "Former Colorado House Speaker, Denver representative Ruben Valdez dead at 82". Colorado Politics. Archived from the original on March 23, 2025.
- Roper, Peer (March 28, 1992). "Ross Perot: Remember that name". The Pueblo Chieftain. Archived from the original on March 24, 2025.

=== Newspapers ===
- "Bilingual education bill signed into law". Fort Collins Coloradoan. July 1, 1975. p. 7 – via Newspapers.com.
- "Coloradans Didn't Help Carter Much". The Gazette. July 17, 1976. p. 6 – via Newspapers.com.
- "Colorado House committee kills controversial marijuana bill". Greeley Daily Tribune. May 22, 1973. p. 5 – via Newspapers.com.
- "Democrat lawmakers name Puebloan leader". The Daily Sentinel. November 19, 1978. p. 28 – via Newspapers.com.
- "Demos Choose Top Leaders For '73 General Assembly". The Daily Sentinel. November 20, 1972. p. 8 – via Newspapers.com.
- "Democratic leader raps chief justice". The Daily Sentinel. July 14, 1981. p. 3 – via Newspapers.com.
- "Edmonds named to redistrict panel". The Daily Sentinel. July 2, 1981. p. 12 – via Newspapers.com.
- "Klein seeking Senate seat". Fort Collins Coloradoan. May 13, 1970. p. 2 – via Newspapers.com.
- "Lamm announces staff shifts". The Daily Sentinel. November 19, 1982. p. 3 – via Newspapers.com.
- "Lobbyists downplay salary list". The Daily Sentinel. August 7, 1995. p. 3 – via Newspapers.com.
- "Proposed Bill Would Prohibit State Fund Use for 1976 Winter Olympics". The Gazette. February 4, 1971. p. 4F.
- "Registration Fee Charge Is 'Poll Tax'". The Gazette. February 29, 1972. p. 13 – via Newspapers.com.
- "Social Services chief selected". The Daily Sentinel. October 13, 1979. p. 15 – via Newspapers.com.
- "Strahle, Valdez picked leaders in state house". Fort Collins Coloradoan. November 22, 1974. p. 2 – via Newspapers.com.
- "Valdez Enters Race For No. 2 State Job". The Gazette. November 24, 1977. p. 1B – via Newspapers.com.
- "Valdez seeking Dem nomination". Fort Collins Coloradoan. April 22, 1970. p. 2 – via Newspapers.com.
- "Valdez to assume Social Services job". The Daily Sentinel. October 3, 1985. p. 3A – via Newspapers.com.
- "Valdez wins top-line designation". Fort Collins Coloradoan. June 25, 1978. p. A3 – via Newspapers.com.
- "Young Blasts Mike McKevitt". Greeley Daily Tribune. April 3, 1972. p. 16 – via Newspapers.com.
- "Youthful legislator to hold key position". The Daily Sentinel. November 27, 1974. p. 8 – via Newspapers.com.
- Broussard, Ray (March 30, 1976). "Democrats Decide CED Stays Alive". The Gazette. p. 12C.
- Giblin, Mary (August 8, 1984). "Water, shale oil are topics of Democrats". The Daily Sentinel. p. 1B – via Newspapers.com.
- Herb, Judy (November 14, 1976). "House Democrats pick Valdez as minority leader". Fort Collins Coloradoan. p. 11 – via Newspapers.com.
- Hilliard, Carl (February 24, 1977). "Lamm nominates Romer". Greeley Daily Tribune. p. 2 – via Newspapers.com.
- Hilliard, Carl (February 24, 1977). "Lamm nominates Romer as new state treasurer". Greeley Daily Tribune. p. 1 – via Newspapers.com.
- Hilliard, Carl (April 5, 1992). "Perot campaign thunders into Colorado". The Daily Sentinel. p. 8A – via Newspapers.com.

=== Web ===
- "Ruben Adolfo Valdez". Dignity Memorial.
