= Chuck Berry (disambiguation) =

Chuck Berry (1926–2017) was an American rock and roll musician.

Chuck Berry may also refer to:

- Chuck Berry (album), a 1975 album by Berry
- Chuck Berry (politician) (born 1950), member of the Colorado House of Representatives

== See also ==
- Charles Berry (disambiguation)
- Chu Berry (1908–1941), American jazz tenor saxophonist
