= List of speakers of the Colorado House of Representatives =

Speaker of Colorado House of Representatives
- Incumbent; Julie McCluskie since January 9, 2023
- Status: Presiding officer
- Seat: Colorado State Capitol, Denver
- Appointer: Colorado House of Representatives
- Inaugural holder: Webster Anthony

The following is a list of speakers of the Colorado House of Representatives since statehood.

== Speakers of the Colorado House of Representatives ==
Speaker	Term	Party	County/Residence	Notes	Citation
Webster Anthony	1876–1877	Republican	Arapahoe County		
Rienzi Streeter	1879–1880	Republican	Longmont		
William H. Doe	1881–1882	Republican	Idaho Springs		
Elisha W. Davis	1883–1884	Republican	Lake County		
Thomas B. Stuart	1885–1888	Republican	Denver		
H. H. Eddy	1889–1890	Republican	Axial		
James W. Hanna	1891	Republican	Cliff		
Jesse White	1891–1892	Republican	Cortez		
Elias M. Ammons	1893–1895	Republican	Symes		
Arthur L. Humphrey	1895–1896	Republican	Colorado Springs		
Edwin W. Hurlbut	1897–1898	Silver Republican	Cripple Creek		
William G. Smith	1899–1900	Silver Republican	Golden		
Benjamin F. Montgomery	1901–1902	Democratic	Cripple Creek		
James B. Sanford	1903–1904	Republican	Castle Rock		
William H. Dickson	1905–1906	Republican	Denver		
Robert G. Breckenridge	1907–1909	Republican	Monte Vista		
Harry L. Lubers	1909–1910	Democratic	Las Animas		
George McLachlin	1911–1913	Democratic	Denver		
Onias C. Skinner	1913–1914	Democratic	Montrose County		
John H. Slattery	1914–1915	Democratic	Silverton		
Philip B. Stewart	1915–1917	Republican	Colorado Springs		
Boon Best	1917–1919	Democratic	Arlington		
Allyn Cole	1919–1921	Republican	Lamar		
Roy A. Davis	1921–1923	Republican	Colorado Springs		
Charles C. Sackmann	1923–1925	Republican	Denver		
William T. Lambert	1925–1927	Republican	Sedalia		
John A. Holmberg	1927–1929	Republican	Orchard		
Royal W. Calkins	1929–1931	Republican	Cortez		
Delmer E. Hunter	1931–1933	Democratic	Manzanola		
Byron G. Rogers	1933	Democratic	Las Animas		
Warren H. Twining	1933–1935	Democratic	Aspen		
Moses E. Smith	1933–1935	Democratic	Ault		
Wayne N. Aspinall	1935–1937	Democratic	Palisade		
William E. Higby	1939–1941	Republican	Monument		
Homer Pearson	1941–1947	Republican	Wheat Ridge		
William A. Carlson	1947–1949	Republican	Greely		
Patrick Magill	1949–1950	Democratic	Steamboat Springs		
Ben Bezoff	1950–1951	Republican	Denver		
David A. Hamil	1951–1957	Republican	Atwood		
Charles Conklin	1957–1961	Democratic	Delta		
Albert J. Tomsic	1961–1963	Democratic	Walsenburg		
John D. Vanderhoof	1963–1965	Republican	Glenwood Springs		
Allen Dines	1965–1971	Democratic	Denver		
John Fuhr	1971–1975	Republican	Aurora		
Ruben A. Valdez	1975–1977	Democratic	Denver		
Ronald H. Strahle	1977–1979	Republican	Fort Collins		
Robert F. Burford	1981–1979	Republican	Grand Junction		
Carl Bledsoe	1981–1991	Republican	Hugo		
Chuck Berry	1991–1998	Republican	Colorado Springs		
Russell George	1999–2000	Republican	Rifle		
Doug Dean	2001–2003	Republican	Colorado Springs		
Lola Spradley	2003–2005	Republican	Beulah		
Andrew Romanoff	2005–2009	Democratic	Denver		
Terrance Carroll	2009–2011	Democratic	Denver		
Frank McNulty	2011–2013	Republican	Highlands Ranch		
Mark Ferrandino	2013–2015	Democratic	Denver		
Dickey Lee Hullinghorst	2015–2017	Democratic	Longmont		
Crisanta Duran	2017–2019	Democratic			
KC Becker	2019–2021	Democratic			
Alec Garnett	2021–2023	Democratic			
Julie McCluskie	2023–	Democratic			

== Speakers of the Colorado Territorial House of Representatives ==
Speaker	Term	Party	County/Residence	Notes	Citation
C. F. Holly	September 9, 1861 – November 7, 1861				
George F. Crocker	July 7, 1862 – August 15, 1862				
Jerome B. Chaffee	February 1, 1864 – March 11, 1864				
Levi H. Harsh	January 2, 1865 – February 10, 1865				
E. N. Stearns	January 1, 1866 – February 9, 1866				
Edward L. Berthoud	December 3, 1866 – January 11, 1867				
C. H. McLaughlin	December 2, 1867 – January 10, 1868				
George W. Miller	January 3, 1870 – February 11, 1870				
Alvin Marsh	January 1, 1872 – February 9, 1872				
D. H. Nichols	January 5, 1874 – February 13, 1874				
Alfred Butters	January 3, 1876 – February 11, 1876				
