= Paul MacAvoy =

American economist (1934–2016)

- Born: Paul Webster MacAvoy; April 21, 1934; Haverhill, Massachusetts
- Died: February 24, 2016 (aged 81)
- Spouse: Katherine Manning MacAvoy
- Children: 2

Academic background
- Education: Bates College; Yale University
- Thesis: Price Formation in Natural Gas Fields (1960)
- Doctoral advisor: John Perry Miller; Charles Horace Berry

Academic work
- Discipline: Economics
- Sub-discipline: Regulatory economics
- Institutions: University of Chicago; Massachusetts Institute of Technology; Yale School of Management; University of Rochester
- Doctoral students: Marti G. Subrahmanyam

Paul Webster MacAvoy (April 21, 1934 – February 24, 2016) was an American economist and expert on regulatory policy.

== Early life and education ==
MacAvoy was born on April 21, 1934, in Haverhill, Massachusetts. He received his bachelor's degree from Bates College in 1955 and received his master's degree and Ph.D. from Yale University in 1956 and 1960, respectively.

== Career ==
=== Academia ===
MacAvoy held positions on the faculty of the University of Chicago and Massachusetts Institute of Technology before joining the faculty of the Yale School of Management in 1977. He served as the Milton Steinbach Professor of Organization and Management at the Yale School of Management from 1977 to 1981 and as the Frederick William Beinecke Professor of Economics in the Yale Department of Economics from 1981 to 1983. He went on to serve as dean and John M. Olin Professor of Public Policy and Business Administration at the University of Rochester's William E. Simon Graduate School of Business Administration from 1983 to 1990. He returned to the Yale School of Management to serve as its dean from 1992 to 1994, and from 1994 to 2004, he was the Williams Brothers Professor of Management Studies there.

=== Government ===
MacAvoy also held multiple government positions during his career, including serving on the Council of Economic Advisors during the presidency of Gerald Ford and co-chairing the President's Task Force on Regulatory Reform. In 1984, President Ronald Reagan nominated MacAvoy to replace Robert A. G. Monks as a member of the board of directors of the United States Synthetic Fuels Corporation.

== Personal life and death ==
MacAvoy was married to Katherine Manning MacAvoy, with whom he had two children. He died on February 24, 2016.
