= Russell George (American politician) =

American politician

Russ George

President of Colorado Northwestern Community College
- In office 2010–2017

51st Speaker of the Colorado House of Representatives
- In office 1999–2000
- Preceded by: Chuck Berry
- Succeeded by: Doug Dean

Member of the Colorado House of Representatives from the 57th district
- In office 1993–2000

Personal details
- Born: May 28, 1946 (age 80) Rifle, Colorado, US
- Party: Republican
- Spouse: Neal
- Education: Colorado State University; Harvard Law School

Russell Lloyd George (born May 28, 1946) is an American politician and lawyer from the state of Colorado.

George was born in Rifle, Colorado where his family ranched and farmed for four generations. He attended Colorado State University where he earned a Bachelor of Science in economics in 1968, and later attended Harvard Law School where he graduated with a J.D. in 1971.

A Republican, he represented the 57th district in the Colorado House of Representatives from 1993 to 2000, and served as Speaker of the House from 1999 to 2000. From 2000 to 2003, he served as executive director of the Colorado Division of Wildlife. In 2004, he was named as executive director of the Colorado Department of Natural Resources, and later also served as director of the Colorado Department of Transportation. In 2018, he was awarded the 2018 Citizenship Medal by Colorado governor John Hickenlooper, recognizing his contributions to the community. From 2010 to 2017, he was president of Colorado Northwestern Community College.
