= Ronald H. Strahle =

American politician

Member of the Colorado House of Representatives from the 46th district
- In office January 10, 1973 – January 14, 1987
- Preceded by: Walter A. Younglund
- Succeeded by: John Ulvang

47th Speaker of the Colorado House of Representatives
- In office January 12, 1977 – January 10, 1979
- Preceded by: Ruben A. Valdez
- Succeeded by: Robert F. Burford

Member of the Colorado House of Representatives from the 47th district
- In office January 8, 1969 – January 10, 1973
- Preceded by: District created
- Succeeded by: Sandy Arnold

Member of the Colorado House of Representatives from the 9th district
- In office January 11, 1967 – January 8, 1969
- Preceded by: Isaac Moore
- Succeeded by: Paul L. Hamilton

Personal details
- Born: December 16, 1921 Stanton, Nebraska
- Died: October 29, 1993 (aged 71) Denver, Colorado
- Party: Republican

Ronald H. Strahle (December 16, 1921 – October 29, 1993) was an American politician who served in the Colorado House of Representatives from 1967 to 1987. He served as Speaker of the Colorado House of Representatives from 1977 to 1979.
