= Charles Bury =

Charles Bury may refer to:

- Charles Bury, 1st Earl of Charleville (1764–1835), Irish politician
- Charles Bury, 2nd Earl of Charleville (1801–1851), Irish politician, son of the above
- Charles Howard-Bury (1883–1963), British explorer and politician, great-grandson of the above
- Charles Rugeley Bury (1890–1968), English physical chemist

== See also ==
- Charles Berry (disambiguation)
