= Sheffield Star Green 'Un =

Sports website

Logo, Sheffield Green Un (Owner Johnston Press)

The Green 'Un ("Green One" in slang) is a sports website. Originally a Saturday sports paper published on Saturday evenings in Sheffield, England, it moved online in 2013. The name derives from the light green newsprint on which it was traditionally printed.

The Green 'Un was first published as the Saturday Sports Edition of the Yorkshire Telegraph and Star on 14 September 1907 and continued under this name until 3 June 1911. From 10 June 1911 to 28 February 1914 it was known as the Week and Sports Special Green 'Un, then as Sports Special The Green 'Un from 7 March 1914 to 24 December. 1937. The title became Green 'Un, after the war on 31 August 1946 and continued so until 23 November 1946, after which it formally assumed the title The Star Green 'Un (30 November 1946). Along with its sister publications The Star and Sheffield Telegraph, the Green 'Un was published by Johnston Press PLC.

It ceased publication in printed form in 2013, with a special souvenir edition celebrating its 106-year history appearing on Monday 15 July 2013. It was one of the last physically printed specialised local sports papers in the country.
