= Terrance Carroll =

American attorney, minister, and politician from Colorado

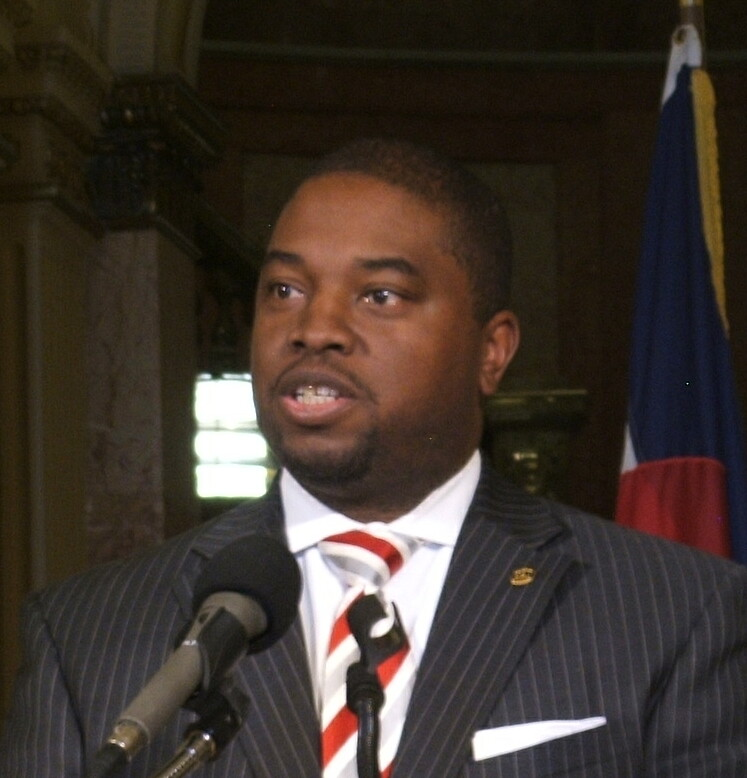
- Carroll in 2004

54th Speaker of the Colorado House of Representatives
- In office January 7, 2009 – January 12, 2011
- Preceded by: Andrew Romanoff
- Succeeded by: Frank McNulty

Member of the Colorado House of Representatives from the 7th district
- In office January 8, 2003 – January 12, 2011
- Succeeded by: Angela Williams

Personal details
- Born: Terrance D. Carroll; January 16, 1969 (age 57) Washington, D.C.
- Party: Democratic
- Occupation: Attorney, minister, politician

Terrance D. Carroll (born January 16, 1969) is an American lawyer, minister, former Colorado legislator and former Speaker of the Colorado House of Representatives, the first African American ever to hold that office in Colorado. Carroll was elected as a Democrat in 2002 and represented House District 7 which encompasses parts of Denver, Colorado.

== Biography ==
Carroll was born and grew up in Washington, D.C., the only child of a single mother who was a share-cropper's daughter. He attended Fork Union Military Academy and H. D. Woodson High School and then graduated from Morehouse College in 1992 with a B.A. After graduating from Morehouse, Carroll moved to Colorado to pursue a PhD. in political science. He took a job as a campus police officer but switched his educational interest from political science to religion. He graduated from the Iliff School of Theology in 1999 with a Master of Divinity degree and the Harvard Divinity School, Center for the Study of Values in Public Life, Summer Leadership Institute in June 2000. He is an ordained Baptist minister. Carroll continued his education, entering in and graduating from the Sturm College of Law at the University of Denver in 2005 with a Juris Doctor. While in law school he was appointed to an open seat in the Colorado House of Representatives in 2003. He is an Eagle Scout. Carroll is currently an attorney with Sherman and Howard LLC. He is also an opinion columnist for the Denver Post and a Distinguished Guest Lecturer in the Master of Public Policy program at the University of Redlands in California.

== Legislative career ==
Carroll represented District 7 in northeast Denver and has served as chairman of the House Judiciary Committee and Assistant Majority Leader. He decided to run for speaker in November 2008, after the front runner for the job, Representative Bernie Buescher, was upset in his re-election bid. On Thursday, November 8, 2008, just two days after that election, democrats in the Colorado House of Representatives chose Carroll as Speaker. He was sworn in as the 54th Speaker of the House at the opening of the Colorado General Assembly in January 2009. The Colorado constitution limits members of the Colorado House to four consecutive two-year terms, Carroll's term ended in 2011.

=== Legislation ===
Carroll was known for his support of education reform. In 2008 Carroll along with former Colorado Senate President Peter Groff sponsored SB130, a bill that would allow Colorado schools the power to control their budgets and make their own decisions on hiring, curriculum, length of the school day and teacher compensation. He has sponsored bills to charter new schools and to standardize the calculation of high school graduation rates. Carroll has also worked on homeland security measures and civil and criminal justice issues.

He was also the original sponsor of the bill that established the Tuskegee Airmen Memorial Highway on Colorado's Interstate 70 to honor the African American flyers that served during World War II.
