= Doug Dean =

American politician

Director of the Colorado Public Utilities Commission
- In office 2005–2022

Colorado Insurance Commissioner
- In office 2003–2005
- Preceded by: M. Michael Cook (Acting)
- Succeeded by: David Rivera

52nd Speaker of the Colorado House of Representatives
- In office 2001–2003
- Preceded by: Russell George
- Succeeded by: Lola Spradley

Majority Leader of the Colorado House of Representatives
- In office 1999–2001
- Succeeded by: Lola Spradley

Member of the Colorado House of Representatives from the 18th district
- In office 1995–2003

Personal details
- Born: December 31, 1960 (age 65) Story City, Iowa, US
- Party: Republican
- Spouse(s): Sheila Baughman (m. 1981, divorced) Gloria Sanak (m. 2001, divorced) Jenifer Waller (m. 2011)
- Children: 4; 2 stepchildren

Doug Dean (born December 31, 1960) is an American politician from the state of Colorado. A Republican, he represented the 18th district representing north Colorado Springs the Colorado House of Representatives from 1994 to 2003, and served as House Majority leader from 1999 to 2001 and Speaker of the House from 2001 to 2003.

Dean was born in Story City, Iowa and attended Tennessee Temple University and the University of Tennessee at Chattanooga.

In 1998, Dean was the House sponsor of Senate Bill 171, which created the Metropolitan Football Stadium District for the Denver Broncos. After approval from the voters of the district, it resulted in the demolition of Mile High Stadium and the construction of a new stadium. It is currently known as Empower Field at Mile High.

Dean was a proponent of the state's public charter schools, and in 2001 passed the first bill to fully fund charter schools after a three year battle.

Dean was appointed to serve as Colorado Insurance Commissioner from 2003 to 2005 by Governor Bill Owens. He served as the National Association of Insurance Commissioners (NAIC) Chairman of the Collaborative Actions Working Group (CAWG) which led multi-state market conduct examinations of insurance companies. He also chaired the Interstate Compact Implementation Task Force. In 2005, Dean led a multi-state investigation of illegal practices of title insurance companies which led to significant reform in the industry.

He served as Director of the Colorado Public Utilities Commission from February 2005 until his retirement in December 2022. During his tenure he was responsible for implementing Colorado's transition towards significant renewable energy resources.
