= Lola Spradley =

American politician (born 1946)

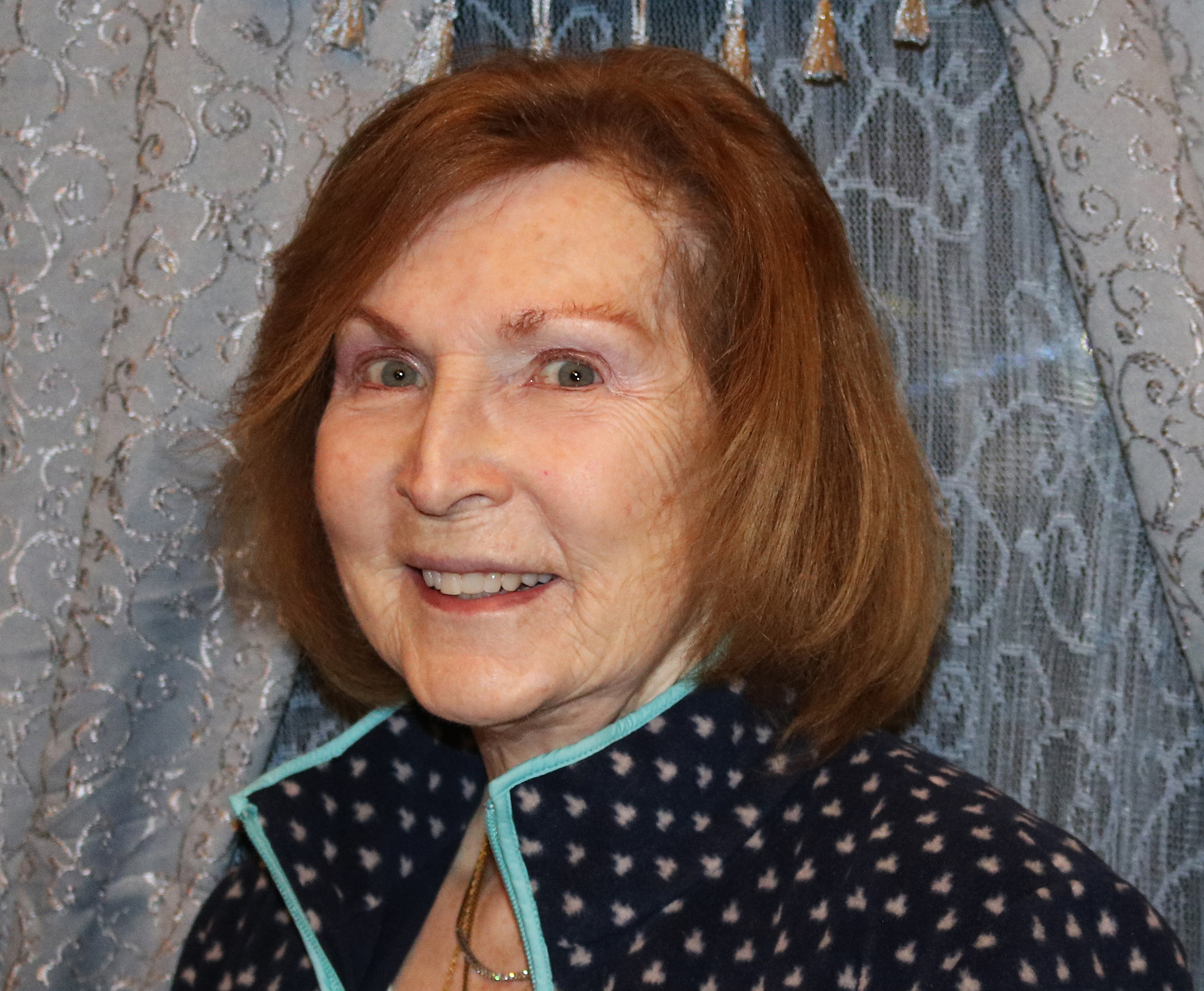

53rd Speaker of the Colorado House of Representatives
- In office January 8, 2003 – January 12, 2005
- Preceded by: Doug Dean
- Succeeded by: Andrew Romanoff

Majority Leader of the Colorado House of Representatives
- In office January 10, 2001 – January 8, 2003
- Preceded by: Doug Dean
- Succeeded by: Keith King

Member of the Colorado House of Representatives from the 60th district
- In office January 8, 2003 – January 12, 2005
- Preceded by: Jim Snook
- Succeeded by: Tom Massey

Member of the Colorado House of Representatives from the 44th district
- In office September 5, 1997 – January 8, 2003
- Preceded by: Larry Schwarz
- Succeeded by: Mike May

Personal details
- Born: June 28, 1946 (age 80) Burlington, Colorado, U.S.
- Party: Republican
- Education: Regis University (BS)

Lola Spradley (born June 28, 1946) is an American politician from Colorado. She served as Speaker of the Colorado House of Representatives from 2003 to 2005, the first woman elected to the position.

== Early life ==
Born Lola Fox in Burlington, Colorado, she was brought up along with her six brothers and sisters on a farm near Raymer, Colorado. She graduated from Fort Morgan High School in 1964 and then had a 29-year career with AT&T, starting as an operator and retiring as an assistant vice president.

== Colorado House of Representatives career ==
In September 1997, a vacancy committee appointed Spradley, who then resided in Beulah, to represent House District 44 (Custer, Fremont, Pueblo, and Teller counties) in the Colorado House of Representatives following the resignation of Larry Schwarz. She was later elected to represent the district in 1998 and re-elected in 2000. Following reapportionment in 2002, she was elected to represent House District 60.

During her time in the Colorado House of Representatives, Spradley, a Republican, held three leadership positions: Assistant Majority Leader, Majority Leader, and Speaker. She also served on the Executive Committee of Legislative Council and on the Legislative Council itself.

== Life after the Colorado State House ==
After serving in the House of Representatives, Spradley and her husband retired to Huerfano County. She volunteers on boards and commissions, such as the Huerfano County Historical Society board and the 3rd Judicial District Performance Commission, to which she was appointed by the governor. She also serves on the Huerfano County Economic Development Board of Directors, and in 2018 Spradley was elected to serve on the Board of Directors of the Huerfano County Hospital District, which operates the Spanish Peaks Regional Health Center west of Walsenburg.

== See also ==
- List of female speakers of legislatures in the United States
