= Aroya, Colorado =

Unincorporated community in Cheyenne County, Colorado, United States

Aroya, Colorado (Arroyo)
- Unincorporated community
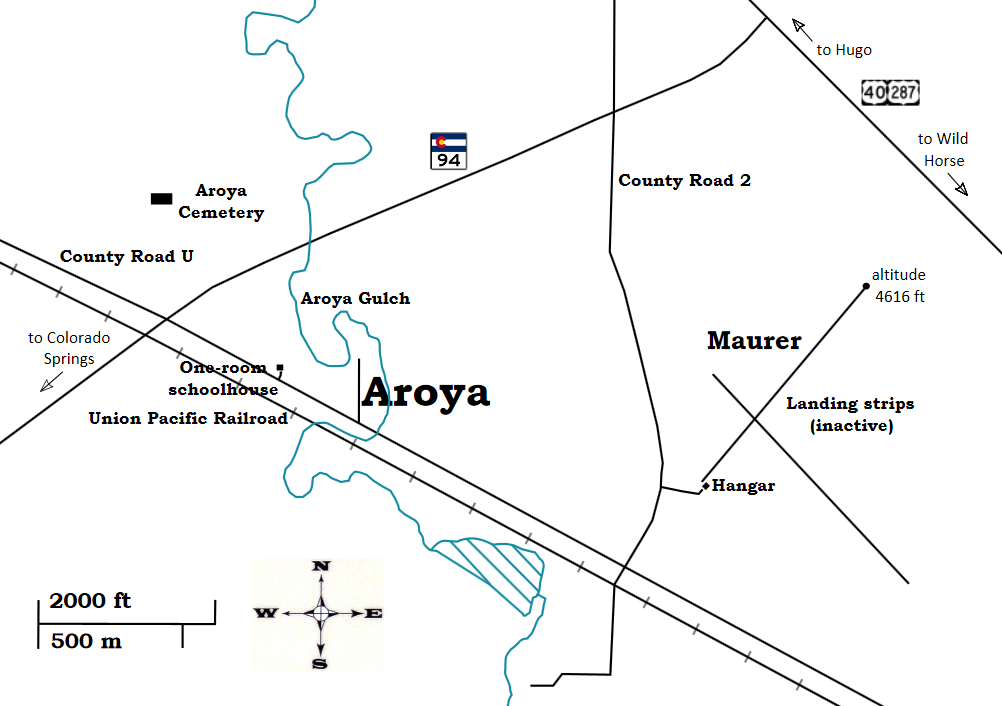
- Aroya vicinity map

- Location of Aroya, Colorado. Aroya (Colorado)
- Coordinates: 38°51′15″N 103°07′32″W
- Country: United States
- State: Colorado
- County: Cheyenne

Government
  - Type: Unincorporated community
  - Body: Cheyenne County
- Elevation: 4,580 ft (1,400 m)
- Time zone: UTC−07:00 (MST)
  - Summer (DST): UTC−06:00 (MDT)
- ZIP Code: 80862 (Wild Horse)
- Area code: 719
- GNIS pop ID: 195190

Aroya is an unincorporated community in Cheyenne County, Colorado, United States. It is located at the eastern end of State Highway 94 near its junction with U.S. Highway 40/U.S. Highway 287.

== History ==
The name Arroyo appears on some older maps. The town was named "Aroya" because of a gulch nearby (arroyo is a Spanish word for "gulch"). The gulch is now named the Aroya Gulch. Aroya originated in 1870 three miles west of the present site as a camp for Kansas-Pacific Railroad track-layers, but was moved to the present site because there was a better supply of water.

The Aroya, Colorado, post office operated from September 17, 1889, until March 26, 1965. The Post Office at Wild Horse (ZIP Code 80862) now serves Aroya postal addresses. Aroya has an airfield (Maurer, altitude 4616 ft, inactive), a railroad (Union Pacific Railroad), and a cemetery (Aroya Cemetery) within a one-mile radius. Aroya also has an old one-room schoolhouse that was in use until the early 1960s.

The JOD Ranch nearby (named for Joseph Ottmar Dostal, initials J. O. D.) was founded in 1883, and there have been ranching activities in the area since the 1870s. Dostal was born in Rychnov nad Kneznou on 16 November 1842. When Cheyenne County was formed in 1889, Joseph Dostal was the new county's largest property taxpayer. The airplane landing strips nearby were a private airfield on JOD Ranch property. The airfield was named after Bill Maurer, one of a number of subsequent owners of the JOD Ranch after it was founded by Joseph Dostal. The landing strips are barely visible because they were dirt and grass landing strips, and they were plowed under in the early 1980s in the process of an unsuccessful attempt to grow wheat after Bill Maurer sold the ranch. The building that was used for the hangar and the pole that was used for the windsock are still in existence.

Carl "Bev" Bledsoe, Colorado's longest serving Speaker of the Colorado House of Representatives, was born in Aroya in 1923.

== See also ==
- List of populated places in Colorado
- List of post offices in Colorado
