= Cy Jamison =

American politician

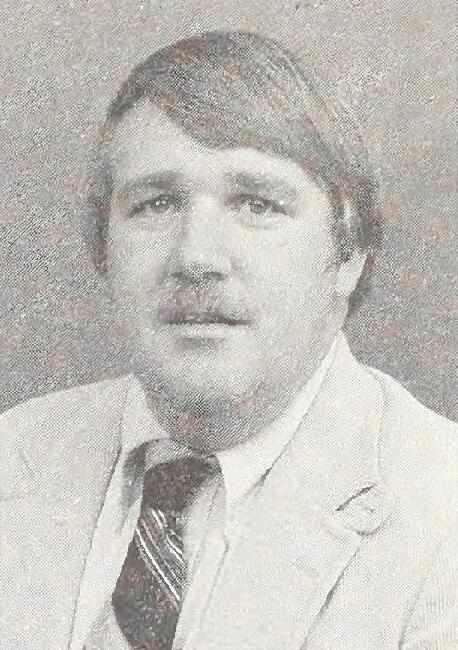

11th Director of the Bureau of Land Management
- In office 1989–1992
- President: George H. W. Bush
- Preceded by: Robert F. Burford
- Succeeded by: Jim Baca

Personal details
- Born: April 12, 1949 (age 77) Billings, Montana
- Party: Republican

Cy Jamison (born April 12, 1949) is an American political aide who served as the Director of the Bureau of Land Management from 1989 to 1992.
