= Saturday sports paper =

In the UK, a Saturday sports paper was a local newspaper published on a Saturday evening containing information about sports matches played on that day. Throughout most of the twentieth century they were very popular, representing one of the few up to date sources of information available to sports fans. Gradually, circulations fell and all had ceased publication by December 2017, with the exception of Portsmouth's Sports Mail, which moved to publishing on a Sunday, finally ending publication in July 2022.

== Overview ==
Saturday sports papers were published locally, with a different paper produced in each area covering local teams in depth. They were often connected to the main local newspaper in the area. In Cardiff, for example, the Western Mail and Echo published the South Wales Sport Echo (previously the Football Echo). The papers were commonly nicknamed according to the colour of the paper upon they were printed, which usually was not white. The "sports pink" or "green 'un" were common names.

Most Saturday sports papers focussed on football, providing match reports of games involving local teams and a full listing of final scores. Many also covered other traditional sports such as rugby or cricket and some expanded into covering less familiar sports such as ice hockey. Saturday sports papers were published as soon after full-time as possible. Cardiff's South Wales Sports Echo was available to buy within twenty minutes of the end of the game, featuring half-time reports and full-time scores, with a fuller edition later in the evening. Many sports fans have fond memories of going out to buy a Saturday sports paper as soon as it was printed to find out how their team had done.

Before the advent of radio, Saturday sports papers were the only way most fans had of finding out sporting results, and consequently they were very popular, some with circulations of more than 50,000. In the 21st century, however, the papers declined dramatically in sales. Birmingham's Sports Argus, which used to be the biggest selling Saturday sports paper in the country, was one of many to be forced to close, publishing its last issue on 13 May 2006. Those that remained saw declining sales, or switched to providing websites.

A number of factors adversely affected the popularity of Saturday sports papers. Televised sport meant that matches (particularly football) increasingly did not take place on Saturday afternoons so could not be adequately covered by a Saturday evening publication. Another issue was the rise of alternative sources of information: the internet, mobile phones and teletext services allowed sports fans to follow their team's progress without the need to purchase a paper.

== The final titles ==
The Sheffield Star Green 'Un closed in the summer of 2013 and the Sunderland Echo Pink followed at the end of the same year. This left only two Saturday sports papers in existence - Portsmouth's Sports Mail, which had only just been resurrected for the 2013-14 season (having originally run from 1903 until 2012), and the Southern Daily Echo's Sports Pink.

The Sports Mail moved its publication date to a Sunday in October 2016. The Sports Pink therefore remained the final Saturday sports paper until it too closed on 9 December 2017. In July 2022, Portsmouth's Sports Mail published its final edition, marking the end of weekend sports papers in the UK.

== Notable former examples ==
- Evening Express's Green Final, which was the sports paper for Aberdeen and the North East of Scotland, ran until June 2002.
- Coventry Telegraph's The Pink ran from 1946 until 2004
- Newcastle Evening Chronicle Pink ran from 1895, last edition 17 December 2005
- Hull Daily Mail's Green Sports Mail ended in 2005
- Birmingham Sports Argus ran from 6 February 1897 until 13 May 2006.
- South Wales Sport Echo ran from 1919, last edition 14 January 2006
- Manchester Evening News Pink Final, switched to a Sunday edition in 2000 before ending in 2007
- Leicester Mercury's Sports Mercury ended in 2007
- Teesside Gazette's Sporting Pink ended in 2008
- Norwich Evening News’ Pink 'Un ended in 2009
- Sheffield Star Green 'Un, which began as the Saturday Sports Edition ran from 14 September 1907 until 20 July 2013.
- Edinburgh Evening News' Pink News, ceased publication in the 2000s.
- Evening Times's Sport Times (later known as Saturday Sport) published in Glasgow ended 29 August 1992.
- Wolverhampton Express & Star's Sporting Star ended in 2009.
- Evening Telegraph's Sporting Post which covered Dundee, Tayside and Fife ceased in May 2000.
- Ireland's Saturday Night published in Belfast, and a sister title of the Belfast Telegraph ended 26 July 2008.
