= Robert F. Burford =

American politician

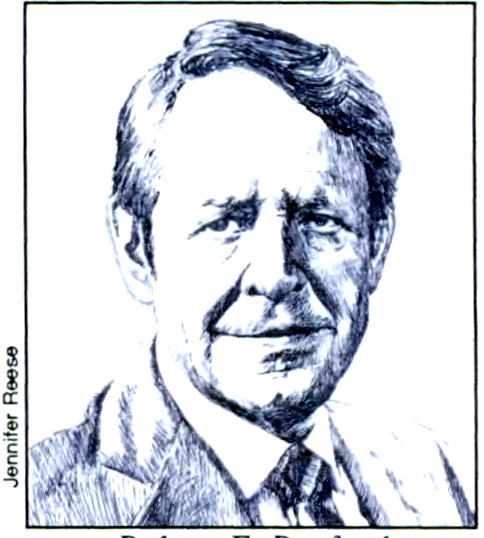

10th Director of the Bureau of Land Management
- In office 1981–1989
- President: Ronald Reagan; George H. W. Bush
- Preceded by: Frank Gregg
- Succeeded by: Cy Jamison

48th Speaker of the Colorado House of Representatives
- In office January 10, 1979 – January 14, 1981
- Preceded by: Ronald H. Strahle
- Succeeded by: Carl Bledsoe

Member of the Colorado House of Representatives from the 54th district
- In office January 8, 1975 – January 14, 1981
- Preceded by: T. John Baer Jr.
- Succeeded by: James M. Robb

Personal details
- Born: February 5, 1923 Grand Junction, Colorado, U.S.
- Died: June 17, 1993 (aged 70) Grand Junction, Colorado, U.S.
- Party: Republican
- Spouse: Anne Gorsuch Burford (m. 1983–1993)

Robert F. Burford (February 5, 1923 – June 17, 1993) was an American politician who served in the Colorado House of Representatives from the 54th district from 1975 to 1981 and as the Director of the Bureau of Land Management from 1981 to 1989. He served as Speaker of the Colorado House of Representatives from 1979 to 1981.
