= Carl Bledsoe =

American politician

Carl B. Bledsoe

49th Speaker of the Colorado House of Representatives
- In office 1981–1991
- Preceded by: Robert F. Burford
- Succeeded by: Chuck Berry

Member of the Colorado House of Representatives
- In office 1973–1991

Personal details
- Born: October 6, 1923 Near Aroya, Colorado, US
- Died: June 5, 2012 (aged 88) Aroya, Colorado, US
- Party: Republican
- Spouse: Alice Elizabeth Cotellessa (m. 1946)
- Children: 3
- Education: University of Colorado Boulder; Colorado State University

Carl Beverly "Bev" Bledsoe (October 6, 1923 – June 5, 2012) was an American politician in the state of Colorado, representing the Eastern Plains counties of Colorado in the state House of Representatives. He served as Speaker of the Colorado House of Representatives from 1981 to 1991, making the longest tenured speaker ever in the state's history.

Bledsoe was born on the Bledsoe Ranch, 12 miles (19 km) north of Aroya, Colorado, to Carl and Josie Bledsoe. He attended public schools and graduated from Kit Carson High School. He attended the University of Colorado Boulder, he served in the United States Army in World War II, attaining the rank of sergeant. Upon his return, he studied for a Bachelor of Science degree in animal husbandry from Colorado State University and began ranching near Hugo.

Prior to his election to the Colorado House of Representatives in 1973, Bledsoe sat on and chaired many county political, school, and veterinarian committees. He served nine consecutive terms in the house and led the legislative audit and finance committees. He retired in 1991. He died at his home in Hugo in 2012 at the age of 88.
