= Sports Argus =

- Type: Saturday sports paper
- Format: tabloid
- Owner(s): Trinity Mirror
- Founded: 1897
- Ceased publication: 2006
- Headquarters: Birmingham, England
- Sister newspapers: Birmingham Post, Birmingham Mail, Sunday Mercury

The Sports Argus was a Saturday sports paper printed on distinctive pink paper and published in Birmingham, England between 1897 and 2006. Its great appeal was that it was available very shortly after all the Saturday 3pm football games had been completed.

== History ==
The first edition was published on 6 February 1897. The earliest copy viewable on the British Newspaper Archive is issue number 22, dated Saturday, July 3, 1897; a four-page, eight-column broadsheet.

For many years the Argus was the largest-selling sports newspaper in Britain and had between 32 and 40 pages. Its final edition as a standalone newspaper was published on 13 May 2006. Although its circulation in 2005 averaged 10,000, it was losing nearly £100,000 a year, in part due to the move away from football matches being played at 3pm on Saturdays.

The title survives as the name of the 16 page pull out sport sections in the Saturday and Monday editions of the Birmingham Mail.

== See also ==
- Athletic News
