= Astley Clarke =

British jewelry brand

- Industry: Jewellery
- Founded: January 24, 2006; 20 years ago
- Founder: Bec Astley Clarke
- Headquarters: United Kingdom
- Website: www.astleyclarke.com

Astley Clarke is a British jewellery brand that was founded in London in 2006 by Bec Astley Clarke. started as an online retailer, selling designer jewellery In 2009 Astley Clarke started designing their own jewellery, after employing a creative director, Lorna Watson. In 2014, following the appointment of a new CEO, Scott Thomson, Astley Clarke pivoted from being a pure play jewellery marketplace to a jewellery brand, selling jewellery designed only in-house in their London Studio. Astley Clarke is known for having contributed to the creation of the demi-fine category of jewellery and uses only Noble metals with coloured gemstones and 14k gold with diamonds.

Astley Clarke won Retail Jeweller's ‘Jewellery Website of the Year’ award in 2008 and Walpole's ‘Best Luxury Brand Online’ award in 2009. The brand has long-standing concession spaces in a number of department stores across the UK, including Liberty, Selfridges and Fortnum & Mason. Google Apps for Work used Astley Clarke as a business case study in 2014 with a promotional video.

In 2019, the Aeternum Group GmbH acquired a majority stake in Astley Clarke. In 2021, the brand opened its first store in Monmouth St, Seven Dials, London.

== History ==
=== Bec Astley Clarke ===
Bec Astley Clarke graduated from the University of Edinburgh with an MA in politics and philosophy then worked online and for luxury brands before founding Astley Clarke. Clarke was listed in Vanity Fair's 2010 jewellery power list and was awarded Ernst and Young's 'Entrepreneur of the Year' Award for London and the South. Bec Astley Clarke sat on the board for International Jewellery London and was a judge for the Bright Young Gems initiative. In 2013 Astley Clarke's founder, Bec Astley Clarke, was appointed MBE for services to the jewellery industry.
