= Charles Berry (minister) =

English minister and schoolteacher

Charles Berry (1783–1877) was an English Unitarian minister and schoolteacher.

== Life ==
Born 10 November 1783 at Romsey, Hampshire, he was the son of Rev. John Berry (died about 1821), independent minister at Shaftesbury, Romsey, and West Bromwich, classical tutor at Homerton College, and finally minister at Camberwell; a direct descendant of James Berry; Joseph Berry, an independent minister (died 2 August 1864), and Cornelius, for 53 years independent minister at Hatfield Heath, Essex (died 8 September 1864) were his brothers. He was educated for the independent ministry at Homerton College, which he entered in 1799 at the time when John Pye Smith succeeded John Berry as classical tutor. He acted as assistant to Pye Smith in a course of chemical experiments.

In 1802 some of the students, including Berry, developed unorthodox views. He left Homerton, and in 1803, at the age of 20, became minister of the Great Meeting, Leicester, in succession to Robert Jacomb. Here he ministered till 1869, having Rev. Charles Clement Coe, F.R.G.S., as colleague from 1865. In 1808 he opened a school which he maintained for over thirty years. To him Samuel Parr addressed, 19 December 1819, a noted letter on methods of classical training. His pupils included Sir John Mellor, John Paget and James Thompson.

Berry was one of the founders of the Leicester Literary and Philosophical Society, and of the Leicester Town Museum. As a preacher he dealt simply with topics of common life, in pithy language. His Christology was humanitarian; early in his ministry he had a pulpit controversy on the subject with Robert Hall, then Baptist minister at Haney Lane, Leicester, with whom he maintained a long friendship. He died 4 May 1877 in the house of his son-in-law, near Liverpool.

== Works ==
Berry published several sermons, including:

- The Duty of National Thanksgiving, 1812.
- Funeral Sermon for Queen Caroline, 1821.
- Remarks on Popery and the present Anti-papal Agitation, 1851.

== Family ==
In 1810 Berry married Ann (died 24 May 1870, æt. 90), daughter of Thomas Paget.
