= Charles, Duke of Berry =

Charles, Duke of Berry may refer to:

- Charles VII of France (1403–1461), previously Charles, Duke of Berry
- Charles of Valois, Duke of Berry (1446–1472), son of Charles VII of France
- Charles, Duke of Berry (1686–1714), grandson of Louis XIV of France
- Charles X of France (1757–1836), previously Charles, Duke of Berry
- Charles Ferdinand, Duke of Berry (1778–1820), son of Charles X of France
