= James Thompson (journalist) =

English journalist and local historian

James Thompson (1817–1877) of Leicester was an English journalist and local historian.

== Life ==
James, son of Thomas Thompson, proprietor of the Leicester Chronicle, by his wife Elizabeth, daughter of John Garton of Halstead, Leicestershire, was born at Leicester on 6 December 1817. He received his education first at a school kept by Mr. Creaton of Billesdon, and then under Charles Berry, minister of the Great Meeting at Leicester. He followed his father's profession of journalist, as a reporter, and then assisting in the editorial department. He soon became an able leader-writer, and for more than thirty years wrote nearly all the leading articles of the Leicester Chronicle, the chief liberal paper in Leicestershire, which had belonged to his father since 1813.

In 1841 Thompson became joint proprietor of the Chronicle with his father, and sole proprietor in 1864. In the same year he purchased the copyright of the Leicestershire Mercury, which he merged with the Leicester Chronicle. In politics he was a liberal and a reformer. He worked actively for the abolition of the corn laws and of church rates, and for the extension of the electoral franchise. For some time he was a member of the town council of Leicester; and he was one of the founders of the Mechanics' Institute there, and honorary curator of the Leicester Museum.

== Works ==
Thompson in early life took a keen interest in the study of archaeology and antiquities. He began by publishing in his journal a series of Passages from the History of Leicester. In 1847, in conjunction with William Kelly, he arranged the ancient manuscripts which were lying in a state of disorder in the Leicester corporation muniment-room.

In 1849 he brought out a History of Leicester, from the time of the Romans to the end of the Seventeenth Century. This, his largest and most important work, was the fruit of much original research. In 1854–6 he edited the Midland Counties Historical Collector, of which only two volumes appeared. In 1867 he published An Essay on English Municipal History, a work which threw much new light on the origin, institution, and development of municipal government in Leicester and other ancient English towns. The manuscripts of the ancient merchant guild of Leicester gave him a mass of original materials for this book, which is referred to by John Richard Green and other writers (cf. Mrs. J. R. Green's Town Life in the Fifteenth Century, 1894, i. 235 seq.). In 1871 he issued a History of Leicester in the Eighteenth Century, supplementary to his earlier history.

Thompson was one of the founders of the Leicestershire Architectural and Archæological Society in 1855, and to its Transactions he contributed numerous papers and communications. He was also local secretary of the Society of Antiquaries, a member of the British Archæological Association, and a fellow of the Royal Historical Society. To Notes and Queries he was a frequent contributor, under the signature of "Jaytee".

He died at his residence, Dannett House, Fosse Road, Leicester, on 20 May 1877, and was buried on 24 May in the Leicester cemetery. He married at St. Martin's, Leicester, on 24 June 1847, Janet Bissett, daughter of John McAlpin of Leicester, but left no issue. His widow died on 29 Oct. 1879.

Besides the books above mentioned, his works were: The Handbook of Leicester, 1844, his earliest work; 2nd edit. 1846. An Account of Leicester Castle, 1859; Pocket Edition of the History of Leicester, 1879.

Attribution

- Fletcher, William George Dimock (1898). "Thompson, James" . In Lee, Sidney (ed.). Dictionary of National Biography. Vol. 56. London: Smith, Elder & Co. "[Memoir of the late Mr. James Thompson, F.R.H.S., 1877; Leicester Chronicle and Mercury, 26 May and 1 June 1877; Leicester Archæological Society's Transactions, v. 60, 61; information from his sister, and personal knowledge.]"
