= 2018 Leicester explosion =

Arson attack in Leicester, England

Coordinates: 52.63319°N 1.16005°W

- Żabka convenience store. 25 February 2018
- Location: Hinckley Road, Leicester, United Kingdom
- Date: 25 February 2018; 8 years ago
- Attack type: Arson
- Deaths: 5
- Injuries: 5
- Perpetrators: Aram Kurd; Hawkar Hassan; Arkan Ali
- Motive: Insurance fraud
- Convictions: Murder, conspiracy to commit fraud by false representation

The 2018 Leicester explosion occurred shortly after 19:00 GMT on 25 February 2018, on the A47 Hinckley Road in Leicester. It destroyed the Żabka convenience store and the two-storey flat above it. Five people were killed and a further five others were injured, two of them seriously. Shortly after the explosion, Leicestershire Police declared a major incident, closing off Carlisle Street and parts of Hinckley Road in the immediate aftermath.

The explosion was caused by arson, carried out in order to facilitate a fraudulent insurance claim. Aram Kurd, Hawkar Hassan and Arkan Ali, who are Iraqi Kurds, were convicted of murder and conspiracy to commit fraud by false representation and sentenced to life imprisonment. Viktorija Ijevleva, the girlfriend of Arkan Ali, was also involved in the planning of the insurance fraud but died in the explosion.

== Background ==
Aram Kurd took over the lease of the Żabka convenience store, Hinckley Road and opened the shop in December 2017.

Kurd planned, along with Hawkar Hassan and Arkan Ali to insure the shop, contents and business, set fire to the premises and submit a fraudulent insurance claim totalling around £300,000.

In early February 2018, assisted by Ali and Viktorija Ijevleva, Kurd obtained an insurance policy for the business and premises.

On 24 February, Hassan, Ali and Ijevleva purchased 26 litres of petrol which they took to the shop in Hinckley Road. It was claimed, in the sentencing remarks of Mr Justice Holgate, that around 45 litres of petrol, several litres of barbecue fluid and four litres of white spirit were purchased in total.

On the day of the explosion Ijevleva was working in the store; Kurd, Hassan and Ali met in a coffee bar where it was decided that Ijevleva should perish in the fire.

Upon their return to the store, Kurd went inside and distracted Ijevleva while Ali set the fire in the basement; Hassan remained outside waiting to drive Ali away from the scene. Kurd made his way to a rear extension of the shop in advance of the explosion, leaving Ijevleva by the till. Ali left the premises via a back alleyway and he and Hassan fled. The explosion took place just after 7.01pm. Kurd escaped through the back yard of the premises.

The explosion caused a "pancake collapse", whereby the ground, first and second floors fell into the basement. Neighbours spoke of their homes shaking due to the force of the blast and compared it to an earthquake, or a bomb.

In the immediate aftermath of the explosion, Kurd presented himself to the emergency services, and passers-by who tried to assist, as a victim of the blast who was lucky to be alive. The following day he gave a series of media interviews feigning concern for the victims while claiming to have been trapped under the rubble himself.

== Investigation and legal proceedings ==
=== Arrests and charges ===
Within days of the explosion Kurd, Hassan and Ali were arrested and on 3 March were charged with manslaughter and arson.

On 31 August, the trio were charged with murder; the Crown Prosecution Service later stated: "At an early stage there was sufficient evidence that Kurd, Ali and Hassan were responsible for the explosion and therefore the deaths of the victims, so they were initially charged with arson and manslaughter. As the investigation progressed, it became clear that their intention was to kill".

In October, they were charged with fraudulently trying to benefit from an insurance scam.

=== Trial ===
Kurd, Hassan and Ali stood trial at Leicester Crown Court beginning in November 2018. The trial lasted for five weeks. They were each assisted by a Kurdish interpreter throughout and they pleaded not guilty to all charges.

Both Hassan and Ali took the stand in their defence. Hassan maintained throughout examination that he knew nothing about either the insurance scam or the setting of the fire. He claimed not to have seen the explosion, despite his close proximity to the scene at the relevant time.

Ali also maintained his innocence throughout examination; despite CCTV images showing that the car in which he was a passenger was close by after the blast, he claimed not to have seen or heard the explosion. When asked about the plan to kill Ijevleva he stated: “It’s not possible. Who would accept to do a horrific thing like this?”. Both claimed they only became aware of the explosion the following day.

During the trial, Prosecutor David Herbert QC told the court that Viktorija Ijevleva had helped obtain insurance for the shop, but was left to die because "she knew too much" about the scam. The court also heard that, while on remand, Kurd told a fellow inmate that he did not want to split the proceeds with Ijevleva and he thought the insurance firm would pay out more if people died. It was further claimed that both Kurd and Ali were aware that the Ragoobeer family were in residence at the time they set the fire and that, due to the quantity of petrol and accelerants used, they must have known that the occupants would die.

Kurd elected not to give evidence in his defence.

=== Convictions and sentencing ===
On 28 December 2018, Kurd, Ali and Hassan were unanimously convicted of five counts of murder. They were also convicted of fraudulently conspiring with Viktorija Ijevleva to make a financial gain by dishonestly pursuing an insurance claim in respect of the fire.

On 18 January 2019 Kurd, Ali and Hassan were sentenced to life imprisonment. Ali and Kurd must serve at least 38 years and Hassan at least 33 years. Kurd and Ali also received a 7-year concurrent sentence for conspiracy to commit fraud, Hassan received 4 years for the same.

Speaking at the sentencing hearing, Leah Reek's mother stated: “Seeing the men on trial showing no remorse truly broke our hearts – they seem to have no value for human life".

Sentencing the trio, Mr Justice Holgate said:

"None of the defendants has shown the slightest bit of remorse for their wicked crimes. They were exceptionally callous and deceitful. They pretended to be concerned about the victims and even to grieve for Ms Ijevleva. Kurd had his prepared story ready for the media and the police. Ali and Hassan pretended to comfort and help the mother of Ms Ijevleva. In truth all three were only concerned to try and save their own skins. They repeatedly lied both inside and outside court". "I am sure that it was during that meeting (of 24 February 2018) that all three agreed that Ms Ijevleva should die in the fire, so that she would not receive any of the insurance monies";

Commenting after the trial, Craig Kelly, Lecturer in Criminology at Birmingham City University, told the BBC: "As far as we are aware, this is the first mass murder in the UK which was caused by an explosive device specifically for monetary gain."

== Fatalities ==
=== The Ragoobeer family ===
Jose Ragoobeer lived with his family in the flat above the Zabka convenience store, he was at work at the time of the incident. His wife, Mary Ragoobar,* their sons Scotty (15), Sean (17) and Shane Ragoobeer*(18) were in the flat above the shop at the time of the explosion. Scotty was the only survivor.

Jose and Mary were married for 22 years and were originally from Mauritius. Their sons attended English Martyrs Catholic School in Leicester.

The Ragoobeer family funeral was held at Leicester Cathedral on 20 April 2019; hundreds of people attended and family members travelled from Mauritius for the service. Jose Ragoobeer spoke of how powerless he felt at seeing the devastation that the explosion that killed his family caused.

(*Note: surname is spelt Ragoobar for Mary, but Ragoobeer for her sons and husband

=== Leah Reek ===
Leah Reek aged 18 was Shane's girlfriend and was also inside the flat above the shop at the time of the explosion. Leah worked as a volunteer at a hospice and was due to start an Adult Nursing course at University, she hoped to become a palliative nurse.
