= Andrew Romanoff =

American politician

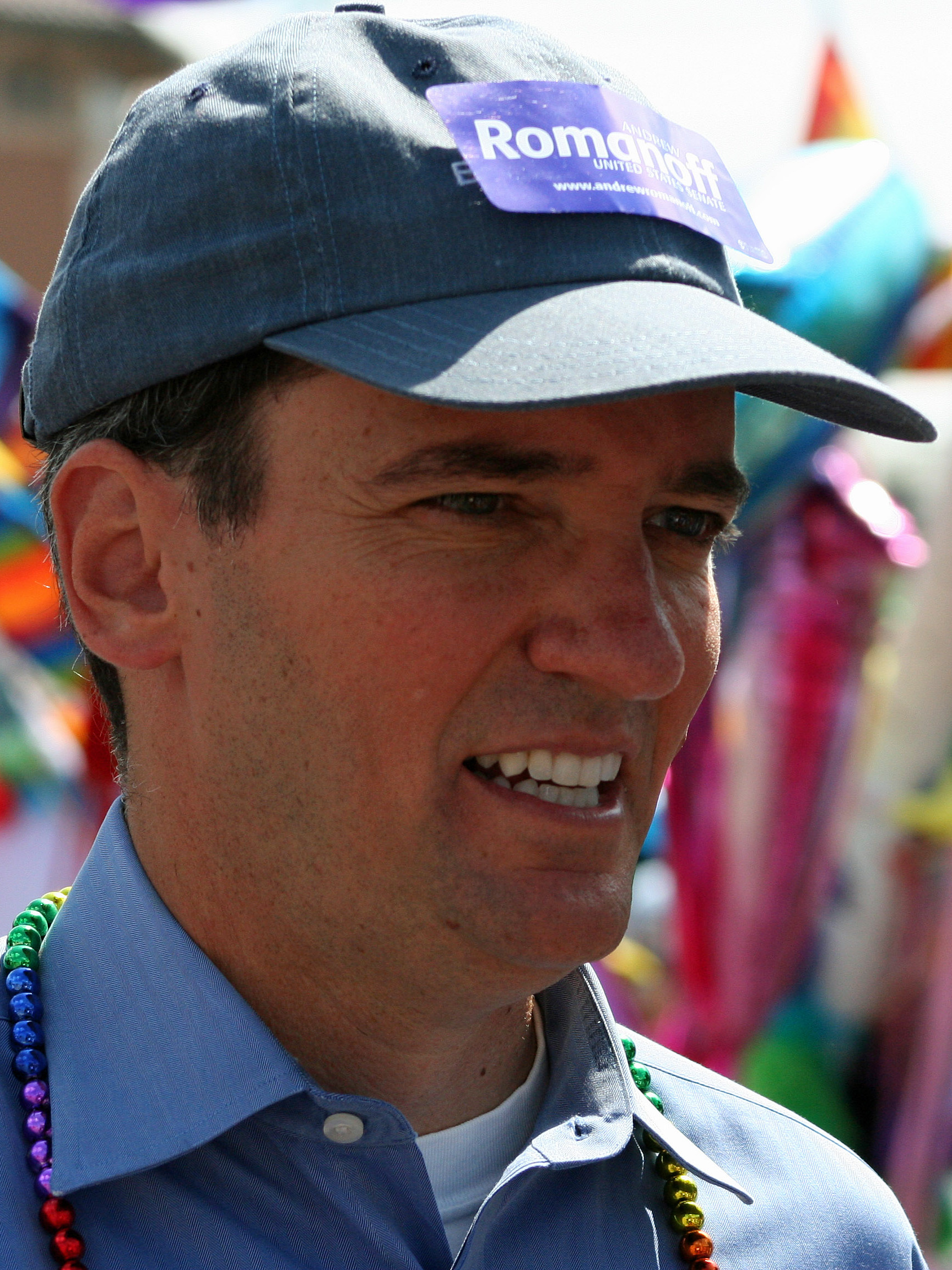

54th Speaker of the Colorado House of Representatives
- In office January 12, 2005 – January 7, 2009
- Preceded by: Lola Spradley
- Succeeded by: Terrance Carroll

Member of the Colorado House of Representatives from the 6th district
- In office January 10, 2001 – January 7, 2009
- Preceded by: Ken Gordon
- Succeeded by: Lois Court

Personal details
- Born: Harlan Andrew Romanoff; August 24, 1966 (age 59) Washington, D.C., U.S.
- Party: Democratic
- Education: Yale University (BA); Harvard University (MPP); University of Denver (JD)
- Website: Campaign website

Harlan Andrew Romanoff (born August 24, 1966) is an American politician and public servant. A Democrat, he was a member of the Colorado House of Representatives from 2001 to 2009, serving as Speaker of the House from 2005 to 2009. He was the Democratic nominee for Colorado's 6th congressional district in 2014 and twice sought the Democratic nomination for the United States Senate. He began his career at the Southern Poverty Law Center, founded the Posner Center for International Development, and has led two nonprofit organizations: Mental Health Colorado, and Great Expectations. On January 16th, 2024, he was named Executive Director for Disability Law Colorado, a non-profit legal and advocacy organization which advocates for and provides legal representation for people with disabilities.

== Early life and education ==
Romanoff was raised in Columbus, Ohio, and graduated from Columbus Academy. His mother, a Democrat, was a social worker. His father, a Republican, was a judge. Romanoff has a twin sister. He is Jewish.

Romanoff earned a bachelor's degree from Yale University. He took time off from Yale to work at the Southern Poverty Law Center, where he joined the fight against the Ku Klux Klan and neo-Nazi groups. He also worked at the Massachusetts Commission Against Discrimination and taught English in Nicaragua and Costa Rica. During his time in Nicaragua, his political philosophy was shaped by reading A Theory of Justice by liberal philosopher John Rawls.

Romanoff obtained a master's degree in public policy from the John F. Kennedy School of Government at Harvard University and a J.D. degree from the University of Denver Sturm College of Law.

== Career ==
From 1993 to 1997, Romanoff worked as a senior associate at the consulting firm of Greenberg Baron Simon & Miller. He then served as a senior policy advisor to Governor Roy Romer from 1997 to 1999. He also worked for Democratic Congressman David Skaggs.

In 2009, Romanoff joined International Development Enterprises as a senior advisor. In 2013 he founded the Posner Center for International Development — now home to nearly 200 organizations dedicated to the eradication of global poverty.

From 2015 to 2019, Romanoff served as President & CEO of Mental Health Colorado, the state's leading advocate for the prevention and treatment of mental health and substance use disorders.

Since 2021, Romanoff has been executive director of Great Expectations, a chief provider of guidance and support for at-risk families in the Roaring Fork and Colorado River valleys.

Romanoff has taught government at the University of Colorado Denver, the Community College of Aurora, Metropolitan State University of Denver, and Red Rocks Community College.

== Political career ==
=== Colorado House of Representatives ===
Romanoff was a member of the Colorado House of Representatives from 2001 to 2009, winning election to four terms, and earning bipartisan acclaim as one of the most effective legislative leaders in America. He led Democrats to their first majority since 1974 and their first back-to-back majorities since 1962. He became Speaker of the House in 2005, and at the time was the youngest speaker in Colorado House history. Before becoming speaker he was the House Minority Leader and represented House District 6. He left the Colorado House after 2008 due to term limits.

Romanoff authored laws to strengthen mental health and substance use services, to expand home and community-based care for older Coloradans, and to protect the victims of domestic violence and sexual assault. He spearheaded the Colorado Economic Recovery Act (Referendum C) and the largest investment in school construction in state history.

Romanoff led the legislature to create The Colorado Channel, providing live television coverage of the General Assembly. In 2008, Governing Magazine named him Public Official of the Year.

=== 2010 U.S. Senate election ===
In early 2009, U.S. Senator Ken Salazar was nominated and confirmed as United States Secretary of the Interior. Romanoff was on a shortlist of possible candidates for appointment to Salazar's seat, but Governor Bill Ritter chose Denver schools' superintendent Michael Bennet. Romanoff opted to challenge Bennet for the Senate seat in the Democratic primary.

Romanoff defeated Bennet in the Democratic State Assembly, with 60.4% of the vote to Bennet's 39.6%, thereby earning the first spot on the August primary ballot.

On August 10, 2010, Romanoff was defeated by Bennet in the Democratic primary.

==== Job offer from the Obama administration ====
On September 27, 2009, Michael Riley of the Denver Post reported that Romanoff had been offered a position in the Obama administration in exchange for not running for U.S. Senate against Michael Bennet. According to Riley, Obama's deputy Chief of Staff Jim Messina called Romanoff to offer him various positions in the administration, including a position at the United States Agency for International Development. Romanoff turned down the offer.

On June 2, 2010, Romanoff issued a statement confirming that Messina had contacted him on September 11, 2009, and told him that Obama was going to support Bennet in the Democratic Party primary. Romanoff told Messina that he would run anyway; Messina "suggested three positions that might be available to me were I not pursuing the Senate race. He added that he could not guarantee my appointment to any of these positions." White House deputy press secretary Bill Burton told The Washington Post, "Mr. Romanoff was recommended to the White House from Democrats in Colorado for a position in the administration. There were some initial conversations with him, but no job was ever offered." Messina sent Romanoff job descriptions for three positions: an administrator for the Latin America and Caribbean Bureau within USAID, the chief of the Office of Democracy and Governance within USAID, and the director of the U.S. Trade and Development Agency.

On June 10, 2010, KDVR reported that Bennet said he had known about the White House's offer to Romanoff.

=== 2014 U.S. House election ===
Romanoff ran for the United States House of Representatives from Colorado's 6th congressional district in 2014. On October 8, 2014, the Aurora Sentinel endorsed Romanoff. He lost to incumbent Republican Mike Coffman, 42.99% to 51.90%.

=== 2020 U.S. Senate election ===
On February 7, 2019, Romanoff announced his candidacy to challenge incumbent Republican Senator Cory Gardner in the 2020 election. Among Romanoff supporters was progressive populist radio host Jim Hightower. Romanoff won the statewide caucuses with 86% of the vote but was defeated by former Governor John Hickenlooper in the Democratic primary.

=== Political positions ===
A political progressive, Romanoff has advocated for a Green New Deal and Medicare for All.

== See also ==
- Colorado House of Representatives
- Colorado General Assembly

Political offices
Preceded by Lola Spradley	Speaker of the Colorado House of Representatives; 2005–2009	Succeeded by Terrance Carroll
