= The Daily Sentinel (Grand Junction, Colorado) =

Newspaper published in Grand Junction, Colorado

- Type: Daily newspaper
- Format: Broadsheet
- Owner: Seaton Publishing
- Founder(s): Isaac N. Bunting; Howard T. Lee
- Founded: 1893
- Language: English
- Headquarters: 734 S. Seventh St. Grand Junction, CO 81501; United States
- ISSN: 1545-8962
- Website: gjsentinel.com

The Daily Sentinel is a daily newspaper published in Grand Junction, Colorado.

== History ==
On November 20, 1893, Isaac Newton Bunting and Howard T. Lee published the first edition of The Daily Sentinel. Lee sold out to Bunting in 1903 and died in 1909. Bunting died in 1911, and his estate then appointed Walter Walker as editor.

Walker acquired the paper in 1917, and published it for 45 years until his death in 1956 at age 73. His son Preston Walker, inherited the Sentinel, managing it until 1970, when he died at age 56 after collapsing during a white water rafting trip. General manger Kenneth E. Johnson was then elected company president.

In 1979, Cox Newspapers acquired the Sentinel, which at that time had a circulation of 30,000, along with the twice-weekly Delta County Independent. James C. Kennedy of the Cox family then served as publisher, until his promotion to a company vice president position in 1985. The corporation then named George Orbanek publisher, who retired in 2007 and was succeeded by Alex Taylor.

Amidst a downturn in the newspaper industry and the Great Recession, Cox put most of its newspaper holdings up for sale. In 2009, it sold the Sentinel to Kansas-based Seaton Publishing Co., a family-owned newspaper company that publishes the Manhattan Mercury. Jay Seaton was named publisher of the Sentinel and president of the new Grand Junction Media Co. In September 2024, the newspaper announced it will reduce its number of print days to two: Wednesdays and Saturdays.
