= Chuck Berry (politician) =

American politician and lawyer

50th Speaker of the Colorado House of Representatives
- In office 1991–1998
- Preceded by: Carl Bledsoe
- Succeeded by: Russell George

Member of the Colorado House of Representatives from the 21st district
- In office 1984–1998

Personal details
- Born: July 1, 1950 (age 76) Pittsburg, Kansas, US
- Party: Republican
- Spouse: Maria Garcia
- Children: 3
- Education: University of Colorado Boulder; University of Colorado Law School

Charles E. "Chuck" Berry (born July 1, 1950) is an American politician and lawyer from Colorado.

Berry was born in Pittsburg, Kansas and grew up in Colorado Springs. He attended the University of Colorado Boulder where he earned a Bachelor of Arts magna cum laude in 1972, and later attended University of Colorado Law School where he graduated with a J.D. in 1975.

A Republican, he represented the 21st district (Colorado Springs and El Paso County, Colorado) in the Colorado House of Representatives from 1984 to 1998, and served as Speaker of the House from 1991 to 1998. Berry later served as the president of the Colorado Chamber of Commerce from 2000 until his retirement in 2021.
