= Charles Berry (economist) =

American economist

Charles Horace Berry (1930 – September 2, 2007) was an American economist and specialist in industrial organization and applied microeconomics. He is well known for his derivation of the Berry Ratio, an analytical tool used extensively by tax and transfer pricing analysts over the world. Berry consulted with numerous government agencies, corporations, and law firms on antitrust and regulatory issues, transfer pricing, and corporate taxation.

== Biography ==
Berry earned his B.Sc. from McGill University in 1951, his M.Sc. from the University of Connecticut in 1953, and his Ph.D. from the University of Chicago in 1956. He was an assistant professor at Yale University and a senior staff member at the Brookings Institution before joining the Princeton faculty in 1966 as an associate professor of economics and public affairs. He was promoted to professor in 1971.

Berry served as associate dean and director of the graduate program in the Woodrow Wilson School of Public and International Affairs from 1975 to 1978, and again as associate dean of the school from 1980 to 1985. In addition, he was the master of Rockefeller College from 1986 to 1990.

Berry died September 2, 2007, due to complications from cancer.

== The DuPont Case and the Berry Ratio ==
In the case of E.I. DuPont de Nemours & Co. v. United States, 608 F.2d 445 (Ct. Cl. 1979) ("the DuPont case"), Berry served as an expert witness on behalf of the U.S. government. At issue was the "proper," arm's length compensation that a Swiss subsidiary of DuPont, a distributor, should earn on the distribution services it performed in Switzerland on behalf of the parent.

In his analysis, Berry determined that the best method for determining an arm's length result was to compare the Swiss distributor's markup on operating expenses to the same markup earned by uncontrolled (i.e., third-party) distributors performing substantially similar functions. Berry's key insight in the case was that distributors should earn a return proportionate to the distribution services performed. The value of the products being distributed, in other words, was irrelevant. Accordingly, distributors must achieve a particular gross profit in order to compensate them for their value-adding services, the costs of which are accounted for, almost entirely, in their operating expenses. The IRS defines the ratio now, awkwardly, as the "Ratio of Gross Profits to Operating Costs".

To reflect the reality of distributors' economic significance and to provide an arm's length return to DuPont's Swiss subsidiary, Berry utilized a ratio that has since been named in his honor:

Berry Ratio = Gross Profit/Operating Expenses

The Berry Ratio remains, to this day, a mainstay of transfer pricing analysis where a distributor serves as the tested party.

Like most metrics that are based on data available in corporate accounts, the Berry ratio misses the value of the intangible costs needed to maintain the intangible property of a corporation. Since the non-routine income generated by intangibles is the main contributor to corporate earnings, and after taxes, to corporate profit the Berry ratio does not provide an adequate metric for the party that owns intangibles, but does show what routine functions captured in operating expenses should earn.
