= Fort Collins Coloradoan =

Newspaper in Fort Collins, Colorado

Coordinates: 40°34′31.94″N 105°3′14.3″W

- Type: Daily newspaper
- Format: Broadsheet
- Owner: USA Today Co.
- Founder: Joseph S. McClelland
- Editor: David Dishman
- Founded: 1873 (as the Larimer County Express)
- Language: English
- Headquarters: 2850 McClelland Drive, Fort Collins, CO 80525
- Circulation: 20,000
- Website: coloradoan.com

The Coloradoan is a daily newspaper in Fort Collins, Colorado. The Coloradoan's website is updated throughout the day with breaking news and video coverage of community news in Northern Colorado.

== History ==
=== The Express ===
On April 23, 1873, Joseph S. McClelland founded the Larimer County Express. It was initially printed weekly by Washington handpress brought over from Cheyenne, Wyoming, and was the first newspaper in the county.

In March 1880, H.A. Crafts bought the Express from McClelland. Frank S. Smith edited the Express for eight years until 1898, when Howard Russell bought the paper. In 1900, Walter B. Sheppard joined him as co-owner.

In 1905, W.D. Junkin bought the Express from Russell and Sheppard. In 1906, James G. McCormick purchased a half-interest in the Express. In 1907, his brother George C. McCormick bought out Junkin, and then later that year the paper secured Associated Press wire service.

=== The Courier ===
On June 29, 1878, Ansel Watrous and Elmer E. Pelton first published the Fort Collins Courier. In January 1880, William W. Sullivan became a third Courier co-owner. Pelton exited the firm at some point. In February 1881, Sullivan sold out to John B. Bruner, who that August sold out to Harvey F. Sturdevant. In March 1882, Sen. Ledru R. Rhodes and B.F. Blake bought the Courier from Watrous and Sturdevant, who required it about 10 months later. In June 1883, Sturdevant was bought out.

In September 1886, Watrous, Sullivan and E. Love formed the Courier Printing and Publishing company. In February 1899, Carl Anderson bought out Sullivan. In February 1916, Watrous retired as editor after 38 years at that paper. That May, Morris Emmerson bought out Anderson.

=== Merger ===
In 1916, Edward D. Foster sold the Fort Collins Review to the owners of the Express and Courier, who evenly split the subscription list and equipment. In 1920, the McCormick brothers bought the Courier from Emmerson and R.A. Goff and merged it with the Express to form the Fort Collins Express-Courier. In 1928, the McCormick brothers, after 22 years at the paper, sold the Express-Courier to Alfred G. Hill. In 1929, a fire destroyed the paper's printing plant. In 1936, Speidel Newspapers acquired the paper.

On April 29, 1945, the Express-Courier was renamed to the Fort Collins Coloradan. In 1976, Speidel merged with Gannett. In 2004, Gannett began construction on a new $6.7 million 37,000 sq. ft. printing facility at 1212 and 1300 Riverside Avenue in Fort Collins. In 2022, the Saturday edition went digital only. In 2023, the paper relocated to 2850 McClelland Drive, whose street was named for the founding editor of the Larimer County Express. In November 2025, Gannett was renamed to USA Today Co.
