= 2020 United States Senate election in Colorado =

- November 3, 2020
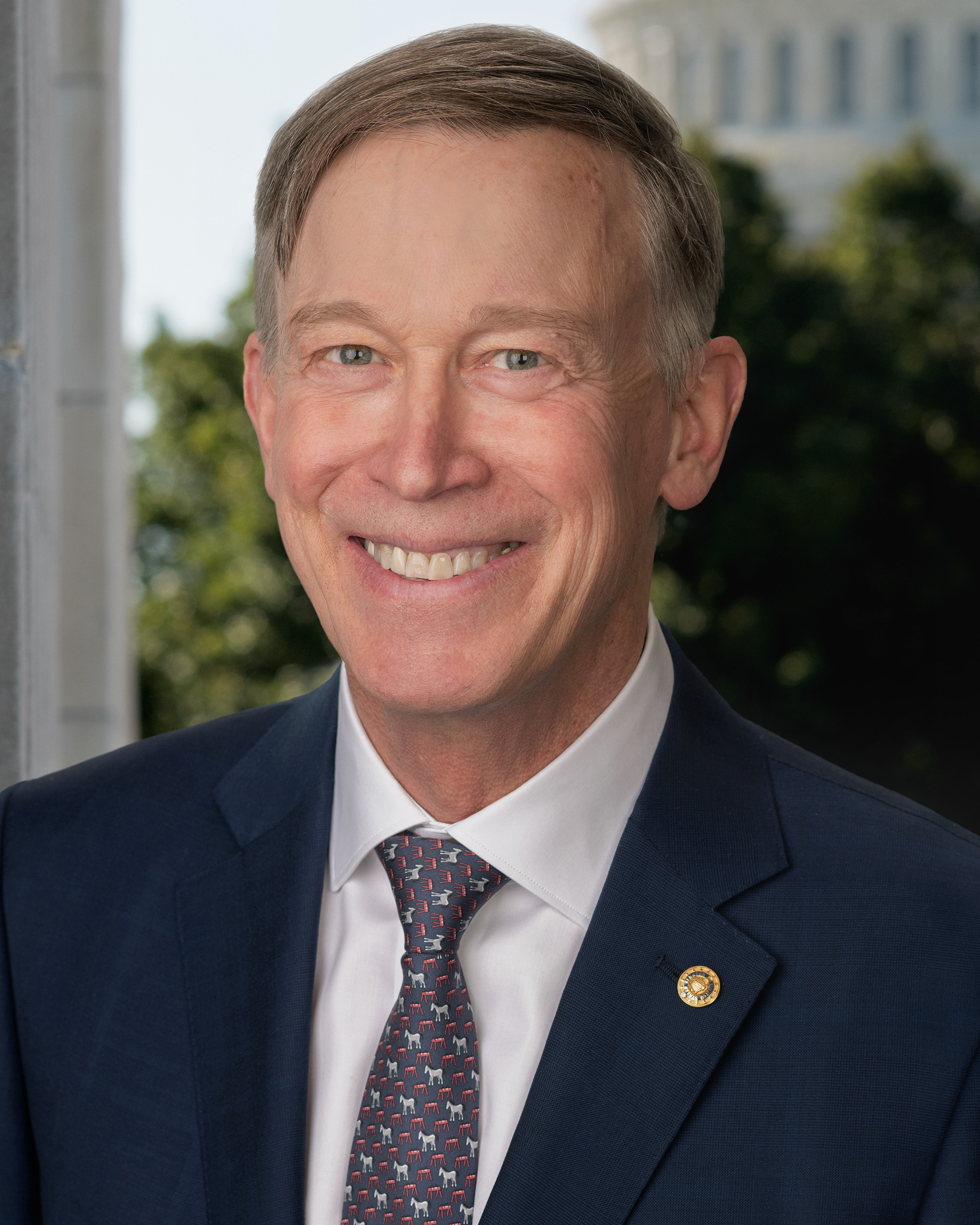

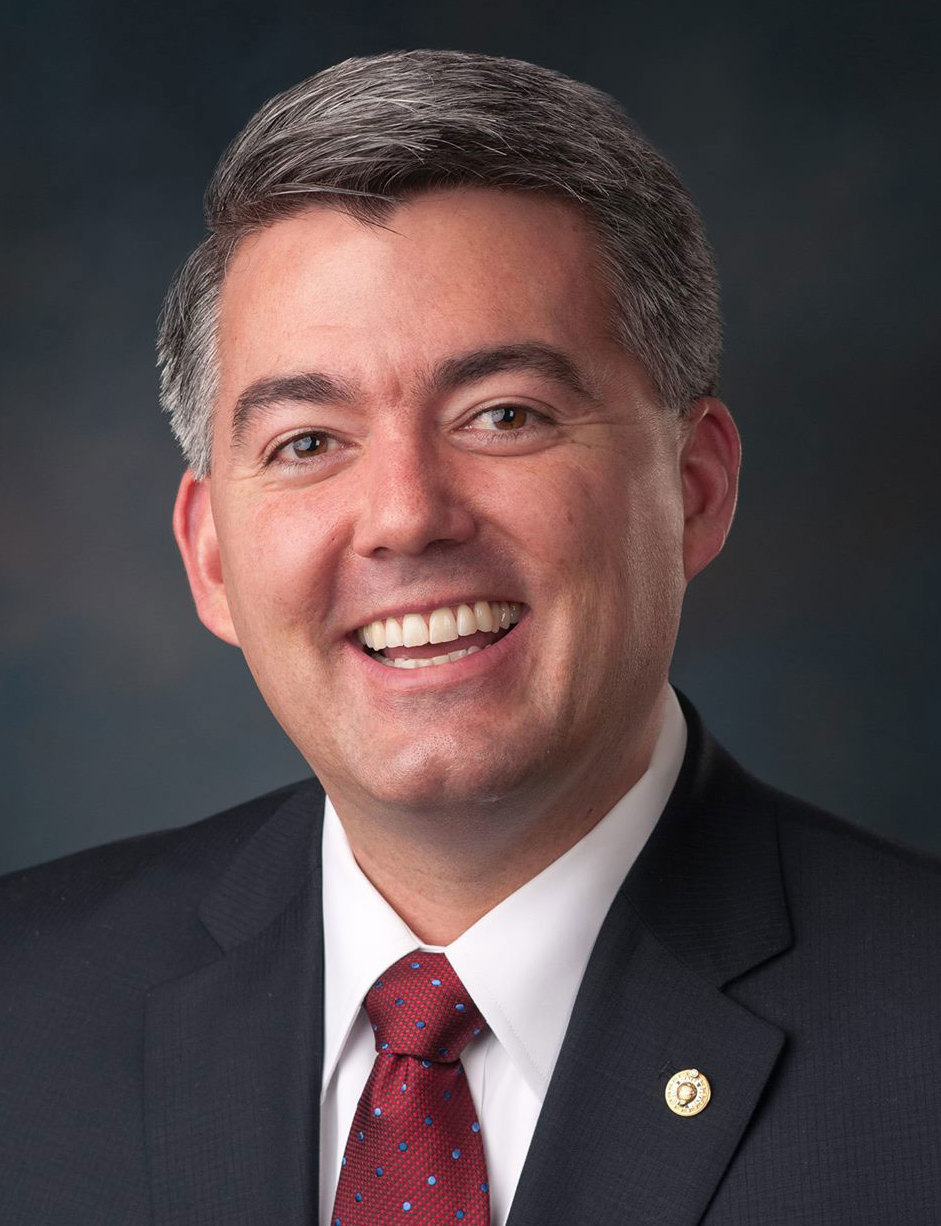
Nominee	John Hickenlooper	Cory Gardner
Party	Democratic	Republican
Popular vote	1,731,114	1,429,492
Percentage	53.50%	44.18%
- Hickenlooper: 40–50% 50–60% 60–70% 70–80% 80–90% >90% Gardner: 40–50% 50–60% 60–70% 70–80% 80–90% >90% Tie: 40–50% No data
U.S. senator before election
Cory Gardner
Republican
Elected U.S. Senator
John Hickenlooper
Democratic

An election was held on November 3, 2020, to elect a member of the United States Senate to represent the State of Colorado, concurrently with the 2020 U.S. presidential election, as well as other elections to the United States Senate, elections to the United States House of Representatives, and various state and local elections.

Under Colorado law, the filing deadline for U.S. Senate candidates was March 17, 2020, the third Tuesday in March of the election year; the primary election occurred on June 30. Incumbent Senator Cory Gardner lost re-election to former Governor John Hickenlooper. Gardner was unopposed in the Republican primary, and Hickenlooper defeated former State House Speaker Andrew Romanoff in the Democratic primary.

This race was one of two Republican-held U.S. Senate seats up for election in 2020 in a state President Trump lost in 2016; the other was in Maine. Many pollsters and pundits considered Gardner to be the most vulnerable Republican senator facing re-election in 2020 due to his narrow victory in 2014, the state's leftward shift, and Trump's unpopularity in the state.

As predicted, Hickenlooper easily defeated Gardner by a 9.3-point margin. However, Gardner did manage to outperform Donald Trump in the concurrent presidential election by roughly four points. This became the first election Gardner had lost in his political career as well as being the widest margin of loss for a Coloradan U.S. Senator since 1978. This was the third consecutive election in which this seat flipped parties.

At 68, Hickenlooper was the oldest elected freshman U.S. senator from Colorado. He was sworn in on January 3, 2021.

== Background ==
Gardner was elected to the U.S. Senate in 2014, narrowly defeating incumbent Democratic senator Mark Udall in a very successful election year for Republicans. Gardner was widely considered vulnerable in 2020 due to Colorado's recent Democratic trend and his support for Trump. Polling showed that more voters had a negative view of Gardner compared to a positive one. Gardner also faced a four-year grassroots campaign across the state by progressive political activists to hold him accountable for his votes, featured a cardboard cutout dubbed "Cardboard Cory". The seat was expected to be highly competitive and the most likely Republican-held seat to flip Democratic. The Democratic nominee, former governor John Hickenlooper, had a consistent double-digit lead over Gardner in the polls.

Various minor scandals in the days leading up to the June 30 Democratic primary sparked speculation that Romanoff might win, but Hickenlooper had an advantage in name recognition, and harsh negative attacks by Romanoff reportedly led many state Democrats and voters to sour on him.

== Republican primary ==
=== Candidates ===
==== Nominee ====
- Cory Gardner, incumbent U.S. senator

==== Withdrawn ====
- Margot Dupre, estate agent
- Gail Prentice, veteran and business owner

=== Endorsements ===
Cory Gardner (R)

U.S. presidents

- George W. Bush, 43rd president of the United States
- Donald Trump, 45th president of the United States

U.S. executive branch officials

- Gary L. Bauer, former United States Under Secretary of Education, assistant to the President for Policy Development, United States Deputy Under Secretary of Education for Planning and Budget, and member of the United States Commission on International Religious Freedom
- John Bolton, former United States National Security Advisor
- Nikki Haley, former United States Ambassador to the United Nations

Organizations

- Campaign for Working Families
- Huck PAC
- Republican Jewish Coalition

Individuals

- Charles Koch, billionaire political activist

=== Results ===
Republican primary results
Party	Candidate	Votes	%
Republican	Cory Gardner (incumbent)	554,806	100.00%
Total votes		554,806	100.00%

== Democratic primary ==
=== Candidates ===
==== Nominee ====
- John Hickenlooper, former governor of Colorado and former candidate for president of the United States in 2020

==== Eliminated in primary ====
- Andrew Romanoff, former Speaker of the Colorado House of Representatives, candidate for U.S. Senate in 2010, and nominee for Colorado's 6th congressional district in 2014

==== Withdrawn ====
- Dan Baer, former executive director of the Colorado Department of Higher Education and former United States Ambassador to the Organization for Security and Cooperation in Europe (endorsed John Hickenlooper)
- Derrick Blanton
- Marcos Boyington, software engineer
- Diana Bray, psychologist and climate activist (endorsed Andrew Romanoff)
- Denise Burgess, businesswoman and Denver Metro Chamber of Commerce board member
- Ellen Burnes, Colorado State University professor and former chair of the Boulder County Democratic Party
- Lorena Garcia, community organizer (Note: A judge ruled that Lorena Garcia could appear on the ballot despite only getting 50% of the signatures needed to qualify, since signatures could not be collected due to COVID-19. The Colorado Supreme Court overruled the ruling after an appeal from Colorado's Secretary of State.)
- David Goldfischer, associate professor at the Korbel School for International Studies at the University of Denver and national security advisor
- Mike Johnston, former state senator and candidate for Governor of Colorado in 2018
- Danielle Kombo, medical recruiter and businesswoman (endorsed Stephany Rose Spaulding)
- Dustin Leitzel, pharmacist
- Alice Madden, former majority leader of the Colorado House of Representatives
- Christopher Hawkins Critter Milton, 2020 Unity Party nominee for Colorado's 3rd congressional district
- Keith Pottratz, technician and veteran (endorsed Lorena Garcia)
- Stephany Rose Spaulding, professor at University of Colorado Colorado Springs and nominee for Colorado's 5th congressional district in 2018 (endorsed Lorena Garcia)
- Erik Underwood, entrepreneur and candidate for Governor of Colorado in 2018
- John F. Walsh, former U.S. Attorney for the District of Colorado (endorsed John Hickenlooper)
- Michelle Ferrigno Warren, nonprofit leader, immigration advocate (Note: A judge ruled that Michelle Ferrigno Warren could appear on the ballot despite only getting 50% of the signatures needed to qualify, since signatures could not be collected due to COVID-19. The Colorado Supreme Court overruled the ruling after an appeal from Colorado's Secretary of State.)
- Angela Williams, state senator (ran for re-election)
- Trish Zornio, biomedical scientist (endorsed John Hickenlooper)

==== Declined ====
- Diana DeGette, incumbent U.S. representative (ran for re-election)
- Kerry Donovan, state senator (endorsed John Hickenlooper)
- Crisanta Duran, former speaker of the Colorado House of Representatives (ran for Colorado's 1st congressional district, then withdrew)
- Jena Griswold, Colorado Secretary of State
- Cary Kennedy, former Colorado State Treasurer
- Joe Neguse, incumbent U.S. representative for Colorado's 2nd congressional district (ran for re-election)
- Ed Perlmutter, incumbent U.S. representative for Colorado's 7th congressional district (endorsed John Hickenlooper)
- Joe Salazar, former state representative

=== Endorsements ===
John Hickenlooper

U.S. presidents

- Barack Obama, 44th president of the United States

Former U.S. Executive Branch officials

- Ken Salazar, former U.S. Interior Secretary and former U.S. senator (CO)

U.S senators

- Kamala Harris, 2020 vice presidential nominee, United States Senator from California (2017–2021)
- Amy Klobuchar, senator for Minnesota (2007–present), former 2020 presidential candidate.
- Elizabeth Warren, U.S. senator from Massachusetts (2013–present), former 2020 presidential candidate

U.S. representatives

- Ed Perlmutter, U.S. representative (CO)

State officials

- Roy Romer, former governor of Colorado

Local officials

- Brianna Buentello, state representative
- Leroy Garcia, president of the Colorado Senate
- Dylan Roberts, state representative

Newspapers

- The Durango Herald

Organizations

- 314 Action
- Bend the Arc: Jewish Action
- Congressional Black Caucus PAC
- Congressional Hispanic Caucus
- Council for a Livable World
- Democratic Majority for Israel PAC
- Democratic Senatorial Campaign Committee
- End Citizens United
- Everytown for Gun Safety
- Feminist Majority PAC
- Giffords
- J Street
- Joint Action Committee for Political Affairs
- League of Conservation Voters
- Let America Vote
- NARAL Pro-Choice America
- National Committee to Preserve Social Security and Medicare
- Sierra Club
- Students for Gun Legislation
Andrew Romanoff

State officials

- Polly Baca, former state senator and state representative
- Peter Groff, former Colorado State Senate president and state representative

Individuals

- Bill McKibben, environmentalist, lecturer, and founder of 350.org
- Marianne Williamson, author, former candidate for California's 33rd congressional district, former 2020 presidential candidate

Newspapers

- Sentinel Colorado

Organizations

- Climate Hawks Vote
- Our Revolution
- Progressive Democrats of America
- Sunrise Movement

=== Polling ===
Poll source	Date(s) administered	Sample size (Note: Key: A – all adults RV – registered voters LV – likely voters V – unclear)	Margin of error	Jena Griswold	John Hickenlooper	Mike Johnston	Andrew Romanoff	Other / Undecided
SurveyUSA	June 19–24, 2020	575 (LV)	± 6.0%	–	58%	–	28%	15% (Note: Undecided with 15%)
Myers Research and Strategic Services (Note: Poll sponsored by Romanoff's campaign)	June 16–17, 2020	500 (LV)	± 4.4%	–	51%	–	39%	–
Unspecified polling firm	October 2019	– (LV) (Note: Not yet released)	–	–	68%	–	19%	–
	September 3, 2019	Johnston withdraws from the race						
Public Policy Polling (D) (Note: Poll sponsored by 314 Action)	August 28–29, 2019	509 (LV)	–	–	60% (Note: Standard VI response)	3%	9%	27% (Note: Undecided with 16%; Baer, Madden and Williams with 2%; Walsh with 1%; "someone else" with 4%)
Public Policy Polling (D)	August 28–29, 2019	509 (LV)	–	– (Note: With only Hickenlooper and Romanoff as candidates)	66%	–	17%	17% (Note: Undecided with 17%)
	August 21, 2019	Hickenlooper announces his candidacy						
	August 9, 2019	Griswold announces that she will not run						
Garin-Hart-Yang Research Group	July 25–28, 2019	600 (LV)	–	6%	61%	10%	8%	15%
Public Policy Polling (D)	July 12–14, 2019	561 (LV)	–	4%	44%	3%	12%	38% (Note: Undecided with 29%; Walsh with 4%; Williams with 3%; Baer and Madden with 1%)

Hypothetical polling

with Dan Baer and John Hickenlooper

Poll source	Date(s) administered	Sample size	Margin of error	Dan Baer	John Hickenlooper	Undecided
Public Policy Polling (D)	August 28–29, 2019	509 (LV)	–	11%	72%	17%

with John Hickenlooper and Mike Johnston

Poll source	Date(s) administered	Sample size	Margin of error	John Hickenlooper	Mike Johnston	Undecided
Public Policy Polling (D)	August 28–29, 2019	509 (LV)	–	69%	14%	18%

with John Hickenlooper and Alice Madden

Poll source	Date(s) administered	Sample size	Margin of error	John Hickenlooper	Alice Madden	Undecided
Public Policy Polling (D)	August 28–29, 2019	509 (LV)	–	69%	14%	17%

with John Hickenlooper and Angela Williams

Poll source	Date(s) administered	Sample size	Margin of error	John Hickenlooper	Angela Williams	Undecided
Public Policy Polling (D)	August 28–29, 2019	509 (LV)	–	70%	11%	18%

=== Caucus ===
On March 7, 2020, the Colorado Democratic Party held a non-binding Senate primary preference poll at its caucus sites. Attendees could choose delegates to county and then state conventions. If a candidate received at least 30% of the delegates at the state convention they would be placed on the ballot. Some candidates were not listed because they instead chose to attempt to collect signatures to reach the ballot. Candidates needed 1,500 signatures from each congressional district. Hickenlooper and Underwood chose to do both. Romanoff collected the needed signatures as of March 8, 2020.

==== Caucus results ====
Romanoff was the only candidate to get more than 30% in the initial precinct caucuses. Hickenlooper withdrew from the assembly process soon afterward, choosing to qualify for the ballot exclusively by petition. Ballot access for assembly candidates will be decided at the state assembly. Caucus winners do not always receive the party's nomination; Romanoff won them in the 2010 Democratic primary for Colorado's Senate race, but Michael Bennet won the party's nomination that year.

The aggregate results of the various precinct caucuses on March 7, 2020, were:

Candidate	Total raw votes	Percentage of vote won (%)
Andrew Romanoff	8,629	54.98
John Hickenlooper	4,761	30.34
Trish Zornio	976	6.21
Stephany Rose Spaulding	771	4.91
Uncommitted	520	3.31
Erik Underwood	35	0.22

=== Results ===
Results by county: Hickenlooper: 50–60% 60–70% 70–80%; Romanoff: 50–60%

Democratic primary results
Party	Candidate	Votes	%
Democratic	John Hickenlooper	585,826	58.65%
Democratic	Andrew Romanoff	412,955	41.35%
Total votes		998,781	100.00%

== Other candidates ==
=== Libertarian primary ===
==== Nominee ====
- Raymon Doane, Libertarian nominee for Colorado's 1st congressional district in 2018

==== Eliminated in primary ====
- Gaylon Kent, author and perennial candidate

==== Results ====
Libertarian primary results
Party	Candidate	Votes	%
Libertarian	Raymon Doane	3,477	62.41%
Libertarian	Gaylon Kent	2,094	37.59%
Total votes		5,571	100.00%

=== Unity Party ===
==== Nominee ====
- Stephan "Chairman Seku" Evans, former candidate for mayor of Denver

==== Eliminated at Unity Party convention ====
- Joshua Rodriguez

==== Withdrawn ====
- Gary Swing, perennial candidate

=== Write-in candidates ===
==== Declared ====
- Dan Doyle (Approval Voting Party)
- Bruce Lohmiller (Green Party)
- Theodore Rockwell, Steamboat Springs (independent)
- Michael Sanchez (independent)
- Danny Skelly, small business owner (independent)

==== Withdrawn ====
- Veronique Bellamy, former candidate for RTD board (Socialist Party)
- Joseph "Joey" Camp, performance artist (independent)
- Lisa Garcia (independent)
- Christopher K. Springer (independent)
- Donald George Willoughby (independent)
- Marti Wolf (independent)

== General election ==
=== Debate ===
Host	Date & time	Link(s)	Participants	
Host	Date & time	Link(s)	John Hickenlooper	Cory Gardner
Colorado State University	October 13, 2020; 6:00pm MDT		Present	Present

=== Predictions ===
Source	Ranking	As of
The Cook Political Report	Lean D (flip)	October 29, 2020
Inside Elections	Lean D (flip)	October 28, 2020
Sabato's Crystal Ball	Likely D (flip)	November 2, 2020
Daily Kos	Likely D (flip)	October 30, 2020
Politico	Lean D (flip)	November 2, 2020
RCP	Lean D (flip)	October 23, 2020
DDHQ	Likely D (flip)	November 3, 2020
538	Likely D (flip)	November 2, 2020
Economist	Likely D (flip)	November 2, 2020

=== Post-primary endorsements ===
Cory Gardner (R)

Organizations

- Citizens for Responsible Energy Solutions
- Susan B. Anthony List
- Tea Party Express

Newspapers

- The Gazette
John Hickenlooper (D)

U.S senators

- Michael Bennet, U.S. senator from Colorado (2009–present), former 2020 presidential candidate

Unions

- International Federation of Professional and Technical Engineers
- National Education Association
- SEIU Local 105
- United Auto Workers
- United Farm Workers

Organizations

- Black Economic Alliance
- Greater Metro Denver Ministerial Alliance
- Humane Society of the United States Legislative Fund
- MoveOn
- Natural Resources Defense Council Action Fund
- Population Connection

=== Polling ===
==== Graphical Summary ====
View source data.

==== Poll results ====
Poll source	Date(s) administered	Sample size	Margin of error	Cory Gardner (R)	John Hickenlooper (D)	Other / Undecided
Keating Research/Onsight Public Affairs/Colorado Sun	October 29 – November 1, 2020	502 (LV) (Note: Additional data sourced from FiveThirtyEight)	± 4.4%	42%	53%	–
Data for Progress	October 27 – November 1, 2020	709 (LV)	± 3.7%	45%	54%	2% (Note: "Other candidate or write-in" with 2%)
Swayable	October 23 – November 1, 2020	443 (LV)	± 6%	43%	57%	–
Morning Consult	October 22–31, 2020	727 (LV)	± 4%	44%	52%	–
Morning Consult	October 11–20, 2020	788 (LV)	± 3.5%	42%	50%	–
RBI Strategies & Research	October 12–16, 2020	502 (LV)	± 4.4%	39%	53%	7% (Note: Doane (L) with 2%; Evans (Unity) with 1%; Undecided with 4%)
RMG Research/PoliticalIQ	October 9–15, 2020	800 (LV)	± 3.5%	42%	51%	7% (Note: "Some other candidate" with 3%; Undecided with 4%)
Civiqs/Daily Kos	October 11–14, 2020	1,013 (LV)	± 3.6%	42%	53%	3% (Note: Doane (L) with 2%; Doyle (Approval Voting), Evans (Unity) and "Someone else" with 0%; Undecided with 1%)
Keating Research/OnSight Public Affairs/Melanson	October 8–13, 2020	519 (LV)	± 4.3%	41%	51%	7% (Note: "Other candidate" with 3%; Undecided with 4%)
Morning Consult	October 2–11, 2020	837 (LV)	± 3.4%	40%	50%	–
YouGov/University of Colorado	October 5–9, 2020	800 (LV)	± 4.64%	40%	48%	12% (Note: "Other" with 1%; Undecided with 11%)
SurveyUSA	October 1–6, 2020	1,021 (LV)	± 3.9%	39%	48%	14% (Note: "Some other candidate" with 6%; Undecided with 8%)
Morning Consult	September 11–20, 2020	613 (LV)	± (2% – 7%)	42% (Note: Overlapping sample with the previous Morning Consult poll, but more information available regarding sample size)	49%	–
Morning Consult	September 8–17, 2020	599 (LV)	± (2% – 4%)	44%	46%	–
Fabrizio Ward/Hart Research Associates (Note: Poll sponsored by AARP.)	August 30 – September 5, 2020	800 (LV)	± 3.5%	46%	51%	4% (Note: Would not vote with 1%; Undecided with 3%)
Global Strategy Group (D) (Note: Poll sponsored by Progress Colorado, a progressive and pro-Affordable Care Act organization.)	August 28 – September 1, 2020	800 (LV)	± 3.5%	42%	52%	5%
Morning Consult	August 21–30, 2020	638 (LV)	± 4.0%	39%	48%	13%
Morning Consult	August 16–25, 2020	≈600 (LV)	± 4.0%	39%	48%	–
Public Policy Polling (D) (Note: Giffords endorsed Hickenlooper prior to this poll's sampling period)	August 18–19, 2020	731 (V)	± 3.2%	42%	51%	7% (Note: Undecided with 7%)
Morning Consult	August 6–15, 2020	≈600 (LV)	± 4.0%	38%	49%	–
Morning Consult	July 27 – August 5, 2020	≈600 (LV)	± 4.0%	39%	50%	–
Morning Consult	July 17–26, 2020	616 (LV)	± 4.0%	42% (Note: Overlapping sample with the previous Morning Consult poll, but more information available regarding sample size and voters who are undecided or for third party candidates)	48%	11% (Note: "Someone else" with 5%; Undecided with 6%)
Morning Consult	July 13–22, 2020	≈600 (LV)	± 4.0%	41%	50%	–
Public Policy Polling (Note: End Citizens United supports candidates who oppose the landmark Citizens United Supreme Court ruling)	June 29–30, 2020	840 (V)	± 3.4%	40%	51%	9% (Note: Undecided with 9%)
Keating Research/OnSight Public Affairs/Melanson	May 1–3, 2020	600 (LV)	± 4.0%	36%	54%	10% (Note: Undecided with 9%; "Another candidate" with 1%)
Montana State University Bozeman	April 10–19, 2020	379 (LV)	± 4.4%	31%	48%	21% (Note: "Don't know" with 17%; "other/none of the above" with 4%)
Keating Research	October 10–14, 2019	500 (LV)	± 4.4%	42%	53%	5%
Emerson College	August 16–19, 2019	1,000 (RV)	± 3.0%	40%	53%	8%
Global Strategy Group (D) (Note: Poll conducted for Mike Johnston)	August 13–14, 2019	617 (LV)	± 3.9%	39%	49%	13%
Public Policy Polling	August 8–11, 2019	739 (V)	± 3.6%	38%	51%	12%

Hypothetical polling

with generic Democrat

Poll source	Date(s) administered	Sample size	Margin of error	Cory Gardner (R)	Generic Democrat	Other / Undecided
Global Strategy Group (D)	August 13–14, 2019	617 (LV)	± 3.9%	38%	48%	14%
Global Strategy Group	January 31 – February 4, 2019	818 (RV)	± 3.4%	40%	51%	9%
DFM Research	January 2–5, 2019	550 (A)	± 4.2%	38%	46%	16%
Change Research (D) (Note: Poll sponsored by ProgressNow Colorado)	December 2–4, 2018	540 (LV)	± 4.2%	41%	47%	–
Public Policy Polling (D) (Note: Poll sponsored by Our Lives on the Line)	August 2–3, 2017	628 (V)	± 3.8%	41%	46%	13%
Public Policy Polling (D) (Note: Poll sponsored by Save My Care, a pro-Affordable Care Act organization)	June 30 – July 1, 2017	870 (V)	± 3.6%	39%	53%	8%

on whether Cory Gardner deserves to be re-elected

Poll source	Date(s) administered	Sample size	Margin of error	Yes	No	Other / Undecided
Fabrizio Ward/AARP	July 29–31, 2019	600 (LV)	± 4.0%	32%	50%	19% (Note: "Refused" with 3%; Undecided with 16%)

with Generic Republican and Generic Democrat

Poll source	Date(s) administered	Sample size	Margin of error	Generic Republican	Generic Democrat	Other / Undecided
YouGov/University of Colorado	October 5–9, 2020	800 (LV)	± 4.64%	39%	47%	14% (Note: "Other" with 2%; Undecided with 12%)
Climate Nexus	February 15–19, 2020	485 (RV)	± 4.5%	40%	48%	12% (Note: "Neither candidate or other candidate" with 12%)
Fabrizio Ward/AARP	July 29–31, 2019	600 (LV)	± 4.0%	42%	44%	14% (Note: "Undecided" with 10%; "don't know/refused" with 4%)

with Mike Johnston

Poll source	Date(s) administered	Sample size	Margin of error	Cory Gardner (R)	Mike Johnston (D)	Other	Undecided
Global Strategy Group (D)	August 13–14, 2019	617 (LV)	± 3.9%	39%	50%	–	11%
Fabrizio Ward/AARP	July 29–31, 2019	600 (LV)	± 4.0%	45%	39%	2% (Note: Would not vote/would not vote for U.S. Senate with 2%)	14%

=== Results ===
The election was not particularly close, with Hickenlooper winning by 9.32%. Hickenlooper's win was expected, as Colorado has moved more toward being a blue state. Key to Hickenlooper's victory was Denver County and its surrounding suburban counties, Adams, Arapahoe, Boulder, and Jefferson, the latter of which had been pivotal to Gardner's victory in 2014. Gardner did well in the typically red El Paso County, home of Colorado Springs. Gardner also did well in many rural areas of the state. However, Hickenlooper's strong performance in heavily populated counties proved too much for Gardner to overcome. Hickenlooper was also likely helped by Joe Biden, who won the state by 13.5%.

Hickenlooper is the first senator from Colorado who was also the governor of Colorado since Senator Edwin Johnson was elected in 1936, though Johnson was the incumbent governor at the time. Hickenlooper was sworn in as senator on January 3, 2021, for a six-year term that expires on January 3, 2027.

United States Senate election in Colorado, 2020
Party	Candidate	Votes	%	±%
Democratic	John Hickenlooper	1,731,114	53.50%	+7.24%
Republican	Cory Gardner (incumbent)	1,429,492	44.18%	−4.03%
Libertarian	Raymon Doane	56,262	1.74%	−0.85%
Approval Voting	Daniel Doyle	9,820	0.30%	N/A
Unity	Stephen Evans	8,971	0.28%	−0.04%
Total votes		3,235,659	100.00%	N/A
Democratic gain from Republican				

==== By county ====
By county

County	John Hickenlooper Democratic		Cory Gardner Republican		Raymon Doane Libertarian		Daniel Doyle Approval Voting		Stephen Evans Unity		Margin		Total votes
County	#	%	#	%	#	%	#	%	#	%	#	%	Total votes
Adams	130,409	55.33	98,341	41.72	4,916	2.09	1,071	0.45	963	0.41	32,068	13.60	235,700
Alamosa	3,734	48.45	3,800	49.31	104	1.35	40	0.52	29	0.38	-66	-0.86	7,707
Arapahoe	204,054	58.53	136,713	39.21	5,694	1.63	1,074	0.31	1,111	0.32	67,341	19.31	348,646
Archuleta	3,591	39.82	5,225	57.93	163	1.81	26	0.29	14	0.16	-1,634	-18.12	9,019
Baca	329	14.98	1,816	82.70	32	1.46	12	0.55	7	0.32	-1,487	-67.71	2,196
Bent	702	31.12	1,488	65.96	33	1.46	26	1.15	7	0.31	-786	-34.84	2,256
Boulder	154,552	75.20	47,321	23.03	2,869	1.40	317	0.15	457	0.22	107,231	52.18	205,516
Broomfield	27,447	59.41	17,855	38.65	712	1.54	82	0.18	100	0.22	9,592	20.76	46,196
Chaffee	6,948	51.17	6,344	46.72	232	1.71	32	0.24	22	0.16	604	4.45	13,578
Cheyenne	119	10.58	995	88.44	7	0.62	2	0.18	2	0.18	-876	-77.87	1,125
Clear Creek	3,494	53.94	2,835	43.77	121	1.87	15	0.23	12	0.19	659	10.17	6,477
Conejos	1,975	46.26	2,243	52.54	24	0.56	18	0.42	9	0.21	-268	-6.28	4,269
Costilla	1,313	62.91	713	34.16	40	1.92	12	0.57	9	0.43	600	28.75	2,087
Crowley	456	26.19	1,230	70.65	36	2.07	12	0.69	7	0.40	-774	-44.46	1,741
Custer	1,059	29.47	2,456	68.34	62	1.73	10	0.28	7	0.19	-1,397	-38.87	3,594
Delta	5,764	29.86	13,118	67.96	308	1.60	79	0.41	34	0.18	-7,354	-38.10	19,303
Denver	305,602	77.74	80,163	20.39	4,984	1.27	963	0.24	1,376	0.35	225,439	57.35	393,088
Dolores	338	23.69	1,064	74.56	17	1.19	4	0.28	4	0.28	-726	-50.88	1,427
Douglas	97,553	42.13	130,045	56.16	3,279	1.42	332	0.14	350	0.15	-32,492	-14.03	231,559
Eagle	17,902	62.27	10,350	36.00	384	1.34	53	0.18	59	0.21	7,552	26.27	28,748
El Paso	152,126	40.36	212,057	56.27	9,932	2.64	1,451	0.39	1,314	0.35	-59,931	-15.90	376,880
Elbert	4,257	22.46	14,340	75.64	299	1.58	35	0.18	26	0.14	-10,083	-53.19	18,957
Fremont	7,201	28.40	17,450	68.81	508	2.00	129	0.51	71	0.28	-10,249	-40.42	25,359
Garfield	14,999	48.72	15,027	48.81	598	1.94	92	0.30	71	0.23	-28	-0.09	30,787
Gilpin	2,183	52.29	1,867	44.72	99	2.37	15	0.36	11	0.26	316	7.57	4,175
Grand	4,579	46.36	5,075	51.38	181	1.83	28	0.28	15	0.15	-496	-5.02	9,878
Gunnison	6,922	62.13	3,978	35.71	193	1.73	30	0.27	18	0.16	2,944	26.42	11,141
Hinsdale	244	39.35	365	58.87	9	1.45	0	0.00	2	0.32	-121	-19.52	620
Huerfano	2,077	47.52	2,160	49.42	97	2.22	25	0.57	12	0.27	-83	-1.90	4,371
Jackson	164	18.92	684	78.89	12	1.38	5	0.58	2	0.23	-520	-59.98	867
Jefferson	210,619	55.87	158,276	41.99	6,191	1.64	1,026	0.27	849	0.23	52,343	13.88	376,961
Kiowa	93	10.45	783	87.98	10	1.12	3	0.34	1	0.11	-690	-77.53	890
Kit Carson	628	16.46	3,138	82.25	36	0.94	8	0.21	5	0.13	-2,510	-65.79	3,815
La Plata	19,873	56.05	14,776	41.68	632	1.78	71	0.20	101	0.28	5,097	14.38	35,453
Lake	2,297	58.11	1,511	38.22	109	2.76	15	0.38	21	0.53	786	19.88	3,953
Larimer	116,419	53.91	94,585	43.80	3,914	1.81	544	0.25	471	0.22	21,834	10.11	215,933
Las Animas	3,509	44.28	4,217	53.21	130	1.64	45	0.57	24	0.30	-708	-8.93	7,925
Lincoln	434	16.46	2,141	81.22	39	1.48	17	0.64	5	0.19	-1,707	-64.76	2,636
Logan	2,117	20.20	8,167	77.92	131	1.25	37	0.35	29	0.28	-6,050	-57.72	10,481
Mesa	29,478	33.05	57,236	64.17	1,785	2.00	457	0.51	244	0.27	-27,758	-31.12	89,200
Mineral	302	39.89	437	57.73	15	1.98	1	0.13	2	0.26	-135	-17.83	757
Moffat	1,120	16.45	5,544	81.41	106	1.56	31	0.46	9	0.13	-4,424	-64.96	6,810
Montezuma	5,538	36.45	9,273	61.03	272	1.79	47	0.31	64	0.42	-3,735	-24.58	15,194
Montrose	7,321	29.45	16,978	68.31	410	1.65	92	0.37	55	0.22	-9,657	-38.85	24,856
Morgan	3,787	27.91	9,544	70.33	136	1.00	69	0.51	35	0.26	-5,757	-42.42	13,571
Otero	3,428	36.60	5,731	61.18	113	1.21	67	0.72	28	0.30	-2,303	-24.59	9,367
Ouray	2,291	57.45	1,622	40.67	68	1.71	3	0.08	4	0.10	669	16.77	3,988
Park	4,800	39.20	7,100	57.98	281	2.29	31	0.25	34	0.28	-2,300	-18.78	12,246
Phillips	463	18.74	1,980	80.13	22	0.89	6	0.24	0	0.00	-1,517	-61.39	2,471
Pitkin	8,761	73.88	2,935	24.75	130	1.10	13	0.11	20	0.17	5,826	49.13	11,859
Prowers	1,435	26.09	3,966	72.11	55	1.00	26	0.47	18	0.33	-2,531	-46.02	5,500
Pueblo	42,791	48.93	42,098	48.14	1,720	1.97	533	0.61	308	0.35	693	0.79	87,450
Rio Blanco	529	14.47	3,065	83.86	46	1.26	13	0.36	2	0.05	-2,536	-69.38	3,655
Rio Grande	2,502	39.85	3,635	57.89	84	1.34	40	0.64	18	0.29	-1,133	-18.04	6,279
Routt	10,284	61.12	6,256	37.18	223	1.33	39	0.23	24	0.14	4,028	23.94	16,826
Saguache	1,887	55.84	1,405	41.58	55	1.63	11	0.33	21	0.62	482	14.26	3,379
San Juan	328	59.64	207	37.64	10	1.82	2	0.36	3	0.55	121	22.00	550
San Miguel	3,808	74.36	1,227	23.96	76	1.48	2	0.04	8	0.16	2,581	50.40	5,121
Sedgwick	320	22.11	1,103	76.23	14	0.97	9	0.62	1	0.07	-783	-54.11	1,447
Summit	12,175	66.14	5,817	31.60	353	1.92	25	0.14	37	0.20	6,358	34.54	18,407
Teller	5,039	30.06	11,307	67.46	339	2.02	54	0.32	22	0.13	-6,268	-37.40	16,761
Washington	346	11.55	2,617	87.35	22	0.73	4	0.13	7	0.23	-2,271	-75.80	2,996
Weld	63,647	38.19	99,424	59.65	2,761	1.66	470	0.28	376	0.23	-35,777	-21.46	166,678
Yuma	652	13.10	4,273	85.85	29	0.58	19	0.38	4	0.08	-3,621	-72.75	4,977
Totals	1,731,114	53.50	1,429,492	44.18	56,262	1.74	9,820	0.30	8,971	0.28	301,622	9.32	3,235,659

Counties that flipped from Republican to Democratic

- Chaffee (largest municipality: Salida)
- Larimer (largest municipality: Fort Collins)

Counties that flipped from Democratic to Republican

- Alamosa (largest municipality: Alamosa)
- Huerfano (largest municipality: Walsenburg)

==== By congressional district ====
Hickenlooper won four of seven congressional districts.

District	Gardner	Hickenlooper	Representative
1st	24%	74%	Diana DeGette
2nd	36%	62%	Joe Neguse
3rd	52%	45%	Scott Tipton
3rd	52%	45%	Lauren Boebert
4th	59%	39%	Ken Buck
5th	57%	40%	Doug Lamborn
6th	42%	56%	Jason Crow
7th	39%	58%	Ed Perlmutter

== See also ==
- 2020 Colorado elections
- 2020 United States Senate elections

== Notes ==
Partisan clients

Voter samples
