= 2014 United States House of Representatives elections in Colorado =

- November 4, 2014

All 7 Colorado seats to the United States House of Representatives
	Majority party	Minority party
Party	Republican	Democratic
Last election	4	3
Seats won	4	3
Seat change	Steady	Steady
Popular vote	1,000,197	936,417
Percentage	50.00%	46.81%
Swing	▲3.32%	▲2.73%

Republican
40–50%
50–60%
60–70%
70–80%
80–90%
Democratic
40–50%
50–60%
60–70%
70–80%

The 2014 United States House of Representatives elections in Colorado were held on Tuesday, November 4, 2014, to elect the seven U.S. representatives from the state of Colorado, one from each of the state's seven congressional districts. The elections will coincide with the elections of other federal and state offices, including Governor of Colorado and U.S. Senator.

== Overview ==
=== Statewide ===
Party	Candidates	Votes		Seats		
Party	Candidates	No.	%	No.	+/–	%
Republican	7	1,000,197	50.00	4	Steady	57.14
Democratic	7	936,417	46.81	3	Steady	42.95
Libertarian	4	33,859	1.69	0	Steady	0.0
Independent	3	24,549	1.23	0	Steady	0.0
Green	1	5,503	0.28	0	Steady	0.0
Total	22	2,000,525	100.00	7	Steady	100.00

Popular vote
Republican	50.00%
Democratic	42.95%
Libertarian	1.69%
Other	1.51%

House seats
Republican	57.14%
Democratic	42.86%

=== By district ===
Results of the 2014 United States House of Representatives elections in Colorado by district:

District	Republican		Democratic		Others		Total		Result
District	Votes	%	Votes	%	Votes	%	Votes	%	Result
District 1	80,682	28.97%	183,281	65.81%	14,531	5.22%	278,494	100.0%	Democratic hold
District 2	149,645	43.26%	196,300	56.74%	0	0.00%	345,945	100.0%	Democratic hold
District 3	163,011	57.98%	100,364	35.70%	17,766	6.32%	281,141	100.0%	Republican hold
District 4	185,292	64.67%	83,727	29.22%	17,488	6.10%	286,507	100.0%	Republican hold
District 5	157,182	59.80%	105,673	40.20%	0	0.00%	262,855	100.0%	Republican hold
District 6	143,467	51.90%	118,847	42.99%	14,126	5.11%	276,440	100.0%	Republican hold
District 7	120,918	44.93%	148,225	55.07%	0	0.00%	269,143	100.0%	Democratic hold
Total	1,000,197	50.00%	936,417	46.81%	63,911	3.19%	2,000,525	100.0%	

== District 1 ==
2014 Colorado's 1st congressional district election
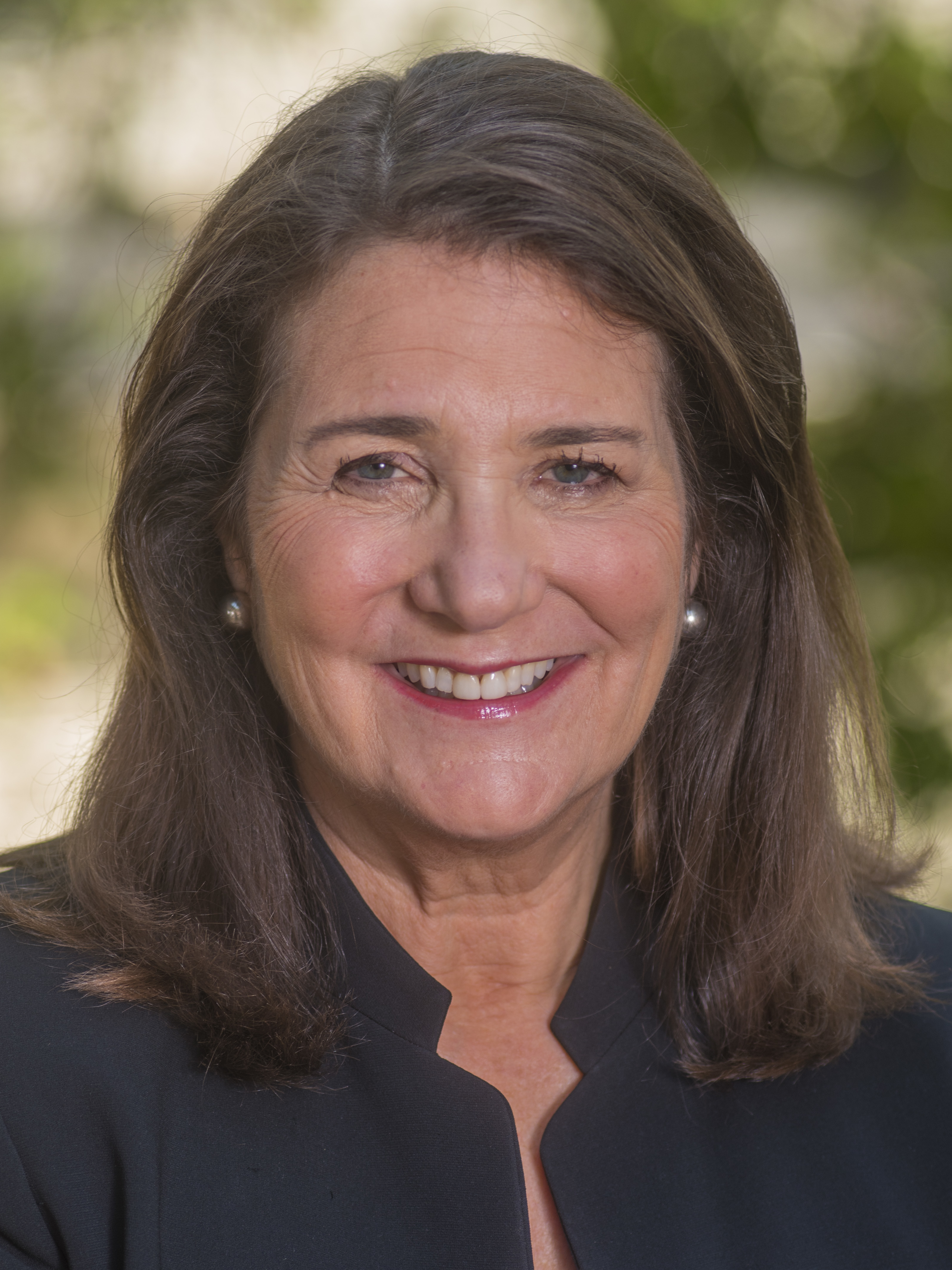

Nominee	Diana DeGette	Martin Walsh
Party	Democratic	Republican
Popular vote	183,281	80,682
Percentage	65.8%	29.0%
- County results DeGette: 50–60% 70–80% Walsh: 50–60%
U.S. Representative before election
Diana DeGette
Democratic
Elected U.S. Representative
Diana DeGette
Democratic

The 1st district is located in Central Colorado and includes most of the city of Denver. The incumbent Democrat Diana DeGette, who had represented the district since 1997, ran for re-election. She was re-elected with 68% of the vote in 2012 and the district has a PVI of D+18.

=== Democratic primary ===
==== Candidates ====
===== Nominee =====
- Diana DeGette, incumbent U.S. Representative

==== Primary results ====
Democratic primary results
Party	Candidate	Votes	%
Democratic	Diana DeGette (incumbent)	43,514	100.0

=== Republican primary ===
==== Candidates ====
===== Nominee =====
- Martin Walsh, investment consultant

===== Withdrawn =====
- Kathleen Cunningham

==== Primary results ====
Republican primary results
Party	Candidate	Votes	%
Republican	Martin Walsh	21,519	100.0

=== General election ===
==== Endorsements ====
Diana DeGette (D)

Newspapers

- The Denver Post

==== Predictions ====
Source	Ranking	As of
The Cook Political Report	Safe D	November 3, 2014
Rothenberg	Safe D	October 24, 2014
Sabato's Crystal Ball	Safe D	October 30, 2014
RCP	Safe D	November 2, 2014
Daily Kos Elections	Safe D	November 4, 2014

==== Results ====
Colorado's 1st congressional district, 2014
Party	Candidate	Votes	%
Democratic	Diana DeGette (incumbent)	183,281	65.8
Republican	Martin Walsh	80,682	29.0
Libertarian	Frank Atwood	9,292	3.3
Independent	Danny Stroud	5,236	1.9
Total votes		278,491	100.0
Democratic hold			

== District 2 ==
2014 Colorado's 2nd congressional district election
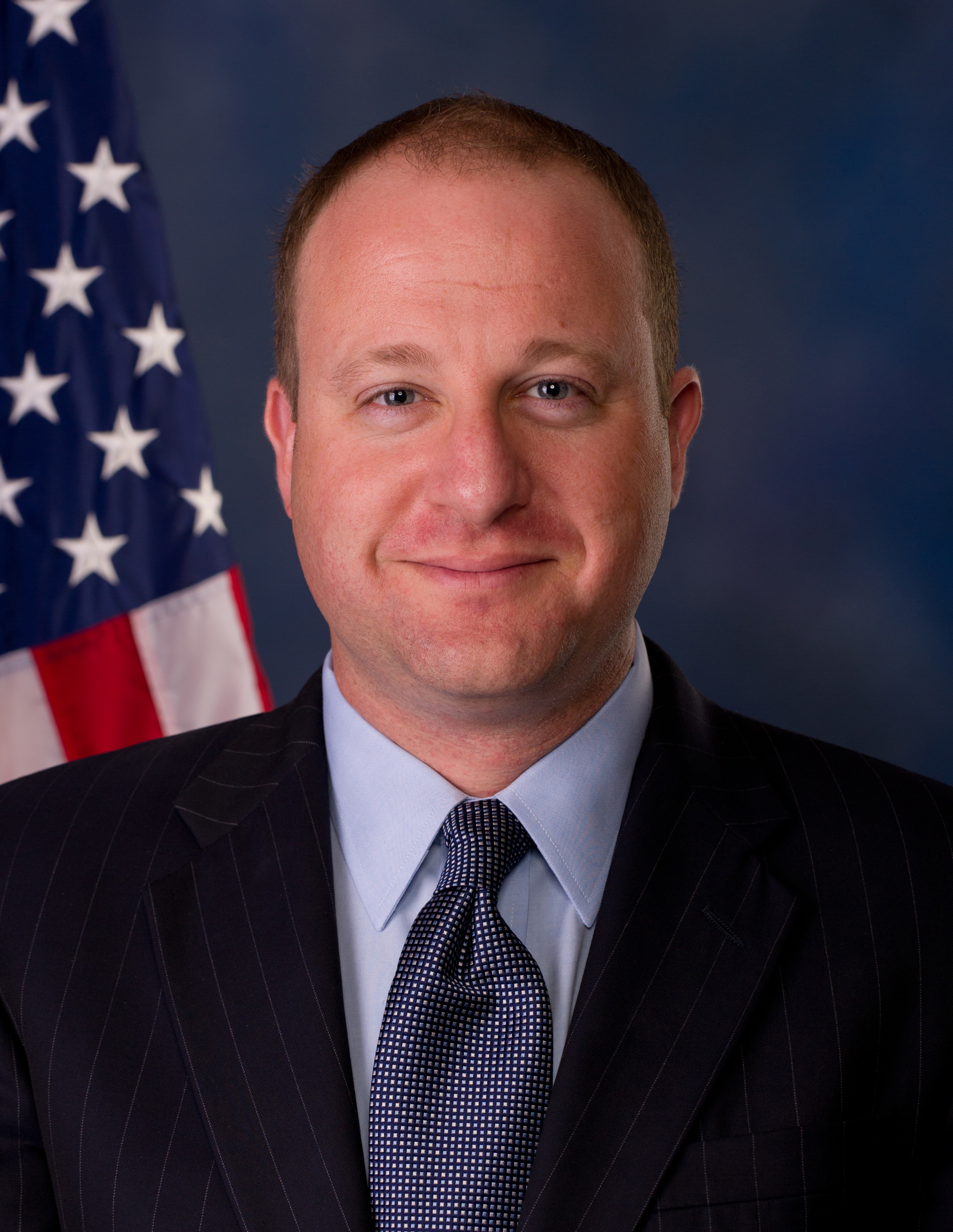

Nominee	Jared Polis	George Leing
Party	Democratic	Republican
Popular vote	196,300	149,645
Percentage	56.7%	43.3%
- County results Polis: 50–60% 60–70% 70–80% Leing: 50–60% 60–70%
U.S. Representative before election
Jared Polis
Democratic
Elected U.S. Representative
Jared Polis
Democratic

The 2nd district is located in North Central Colorado and includes Larimer, Grand, Boulder, Gilpin, Summit, Eagle, Clear Creek and Jefferson counties. The incumbent Democrat Jared Polis, who had represented the district since 2009, ran for re-election. He was re-elected with 56% of the vote in 2012 and the district has a PVI of D+8.

=== Democratic primary ===
==== Candidates ====
===== Nominee =====
- Jared Polis, incumbent U.S. Representative

==== Primary results ====
Democratic primary results
Party	Candidate	Votes	%
Democratic	Jared Polis (incumbent)	37,759	100.0

=== Republican primary ===
==== Candidates ====
===== Nominee =====
- George Leing, attorney and former chair of the Boulder County Republican Party

===== Withdrawn =====
- Bob Comer
- Larry Sarner

==== Primary results ====
Republican primary results
Party	Candidate	Votes	%
Republican	George Leing	43,481	100.0

=== General election ===
==== Endorsements ====
Jared Polis (D)

Newspapers

- The Denver Post
George Leing (R)

Organizations

- National Republican Congressional Committee "On the Radar" Program

==== Predictions ====
Source	Ranking	As of
The Cook Political Report	Safe D	November 3, 2014
Rothenberg	Safe D	October 24, 2014
Sabato's Crystal Ball	Safe D	October 30, 2014
RCP	Safe D	November 2, 2014
Daily Kos Elections	Safe D	November 4, 2014

==== Results ====
Colorado's 2nd congressional district, 2014
Party	Candidate	Votes	%
Democratic	Jared Polis (incumbent)	196,300	56.7
Republican	George Leing	149,645	43.3
Total votes		345,945	100.0
Democratic hold			

== District 3 ==
2014 Colorado's 3rd congressional district election
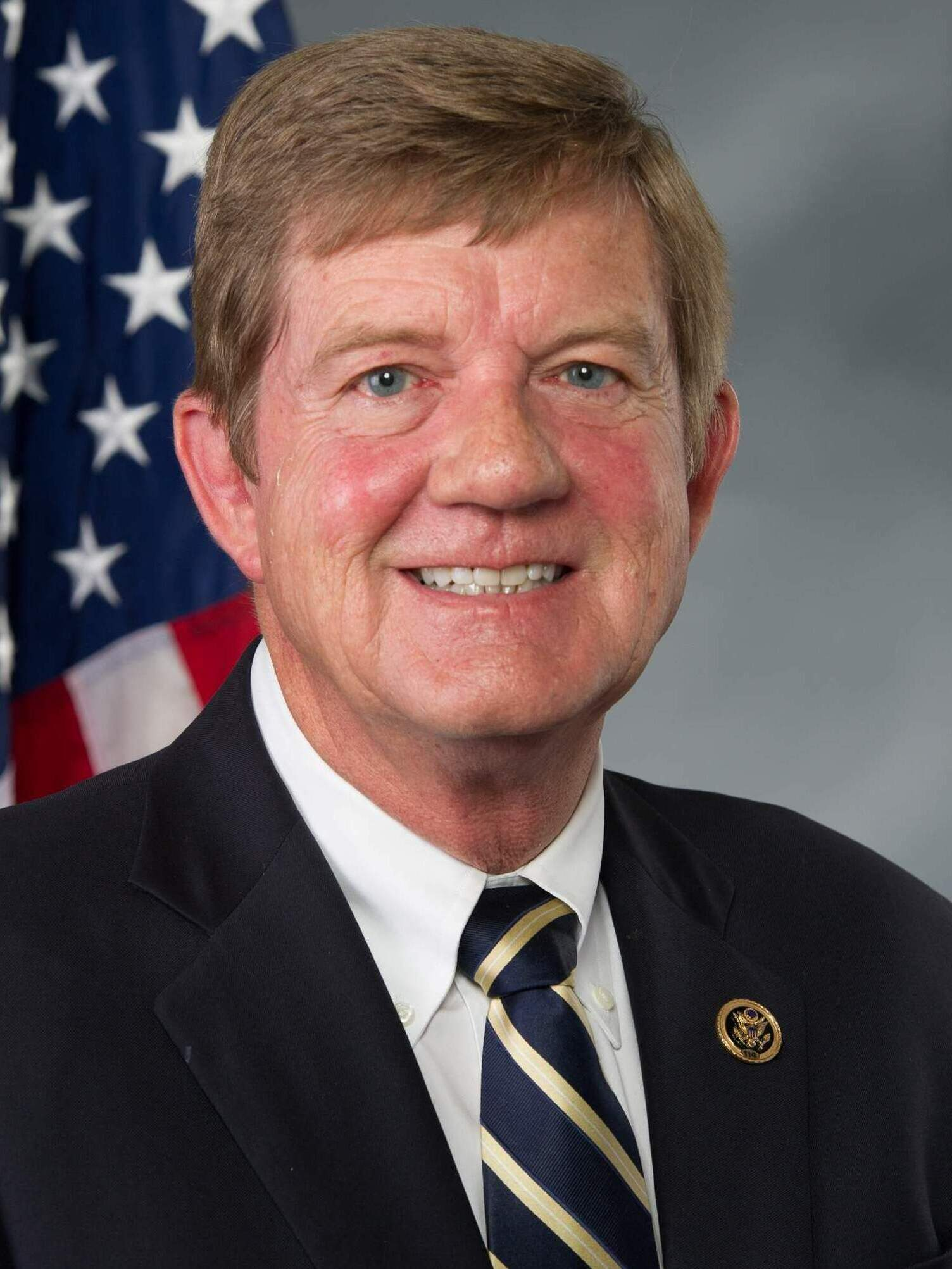

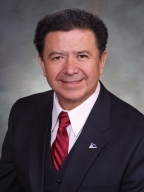
Nominee	Scott Tipton	Abel Tapia
Party	Republican	Democratic
Popular vote	163,011	100,364
Percentage	58.0%	35.7%
- County results Tipton: 40–50% 50–60% 60–70% 70–80% 80–90% Tapia: 40–50% 50–60% 60–70%
U.S. Representative before election
Scott Tipton
Republican
Elected U.S. Representative
Scott Tipton
Republican

The 3rd district is located in Western and Southern Colorado and includes a large number of sparsely populated counties and the city of Grand Junction. The incumbent Republican Scott Tipton, who had represented the district since 2011, ran for re-election. He was re-elected with 53% of the vote in 2012 and the district has a PVI of R+5.

=== Republican primary ===
==== Candidates ====
===== Nominee =====
- Scott Tipton, incumbent U.S. Representative

===== Eliminated in primary =====
- David Cox, activist

==== Primary results ====
Republican primary results
Party	Candidate	Votes	%
Republican	Scott Tipton (incumbent)	46,177	74.5
Republican	David Cox	15,773	25.5
Total votes		61,950	100.0

=== Democratic primary ===
==== Candidates ====
===== Nominee =====
- Abel Tapia, former state senator and former Colorado Lottery director

===== Withdrawn =====
- Abel Gebre Lake
- Buffie McFadyen, former state representative and Pueblo County Commissioner
- Stephen Sheldon

===== Declined =====
- Joseph Garcia, incumbent Lieutenant Governor
- Gail Schwartz, state senator

==== Primary results ====
Democratic primary results
Party	Candidate	Votes	%
Democratic	Abel Tapia	29,931	100.0

=== General election ===
==== Predictions ====
Source	Ranking	As of
The Cook Political Report	Safe R	November 3, 2014
Rothenberg	Safe R	October 24, 2014
Sabato's Crystal Ball	Safe R	October 30, 2014
RCP	Safe R	November 2, 2014
Daily Kos Elections	Safe R	November 4, 2014

==== Results ====
Colorado's 3rd congressional district, 2014
Party	Candidate	Votes	%
Republican	Scott Tipton (incumbent)	163,011	58.0
Democratic	Abel Tapia	100,364	35.7
Independent	Tisha Casida	11,294	4.0
Libertarian	Travis Mero	6,472	2.3
Total votes		281,141	100.0
Republican hold			

== District 4 ==
2014 Colorado's 4th congressional district election
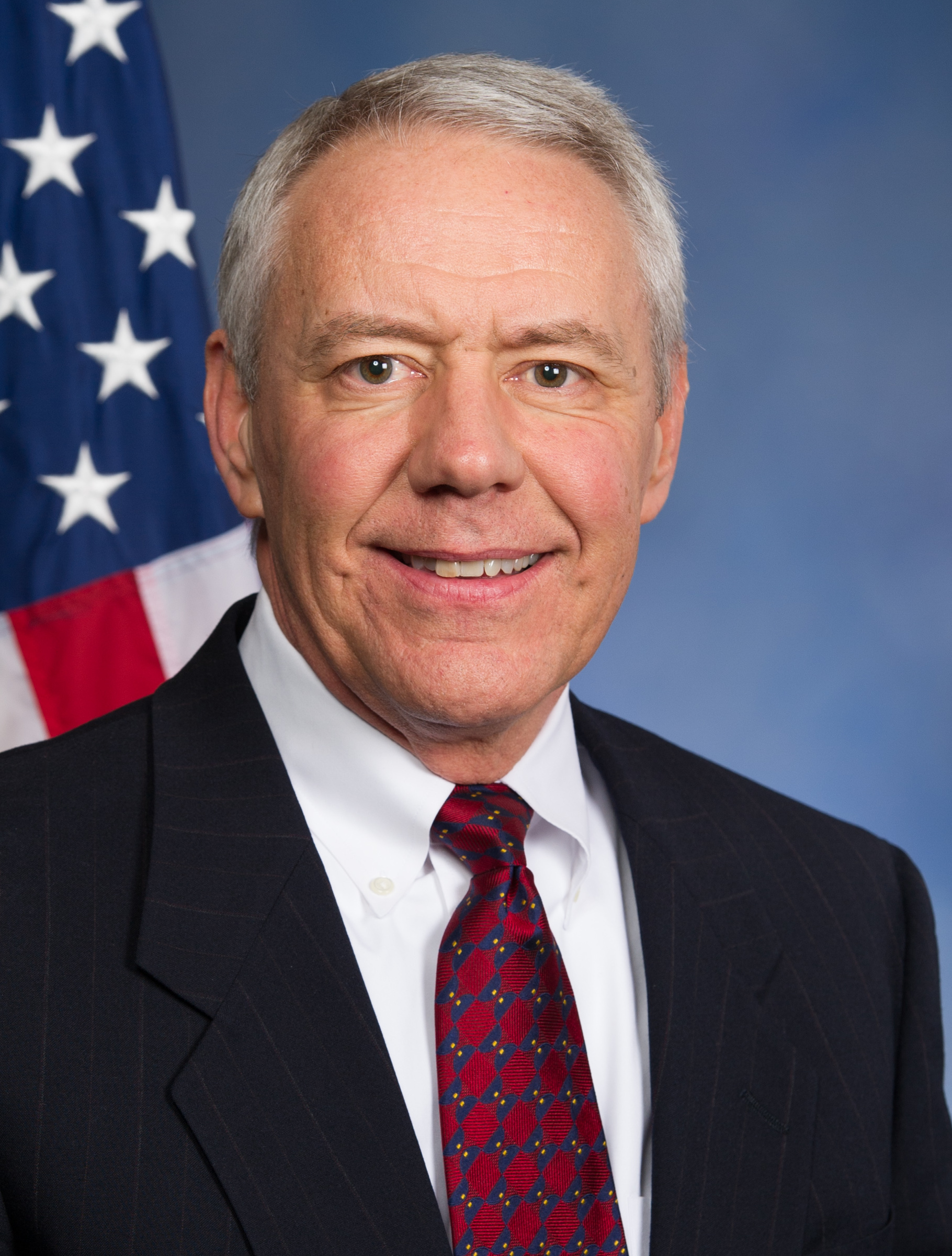

Nominee	Ken Buck	Vic Meyers
Party	Republican	Democratic
Popular vote	185,292	83,727
Percentage	64.7%	29.2%
- County results Buck: 50–60% 60–70% 70–80% 80–90% Meyers: 40–50%
U.S. Representative before election
Cory Gardner
Republican
Elected U.S. Representative
Ken Buck
Republican

The 4th district is located in Eastern Colorado and includes numerous sparsely populated counties. The incumbent Republican Cory Gardner, who represented the district since 2011, did not run for re-election instead he ran for the U.S. Senate. He was re-elected with 58% of the vote in 2012. The district has a PVI of R+11.

=== Republican primary ===
==== Candidates ====
===== Nominee =====
- Ken Buck, Weld County District Attorney and nominee for the Senate in 2010

===== Eliminated in primary =====
- Barbara Kirkmeyer, Weld County Commissioner
- Steve Laffey, former mayor of Cranston, Rhode Island, and candidate for the U.S. Senate from Rhode Island in 2006
- Scott Renfroe, state senator

===== Declined =====
- Sean Conway, Weld County Commissioner
- Tim Dore, state representative
- Cory Gardner, incumbent U.S. Representative (running for the Senate)
- Frank McNulty, state representative
- Clarice Navarro, state representative
- B.J. Nikkel, former state representative
- Jerry Sonnenberg, state representative (running for the state senate)

==== Primary results ====
Republican primary results
Party	Candidate	Votes	%
Republican	Ken Buck	32,714	44.2
Republican	Scott Renfroe	17,722	23.9
Republican	Barbara Kirkmeyer	12,155	16.4
Republican	Steve Laffey	11,433	15.5
Total votes		74,024	100.0

=== Democratic primary ===
==== Candidates ====
===== Nominee =====
- Vic Meyers, case manager in the Colorado Department of Corrections and nominee for state representative in 2000

===== Withdrew =====
- Dan Chapin

==== Primary results ====
Democratic primary results
Party	Candidate	Votes	%
Democratic	Vic Meyers	20,883	100.0

=== General election ===
==== Endorsements ====
Ken Buck (R)

Organizations

- Eagle Forum
- National Republican Congressional Committee "Vanguard" Program
- Tea Party Express

Newspapers

- The Denver Post

==== Predictions ====
Source	Ranking	As of
The Cook Political Report	Safe R	November 3, 2014
Rothenberg	Safe R	October 24, 2014
Sabato's Crystal Ball	Safe R	October 30, 2014
RCP	Safe R	November 2, 2014
Daily Kos Elections	Safe R	November 4, 2014

==== Results ====
Colorado's 4th congressional district, 2014
Party	Candidate	Votes	%
Republican	Ken Buck	185,292	64.7
Democratic	Vic Meyers	83,727	29.2
Libertarian	Jess Loban	9,472	3.3
Independent	Grant Doherty	8,016	2.8
Total votes		286,507	100.0
Republican hold			

== District 5 ==
2014 Colorado's 5th congressional district election
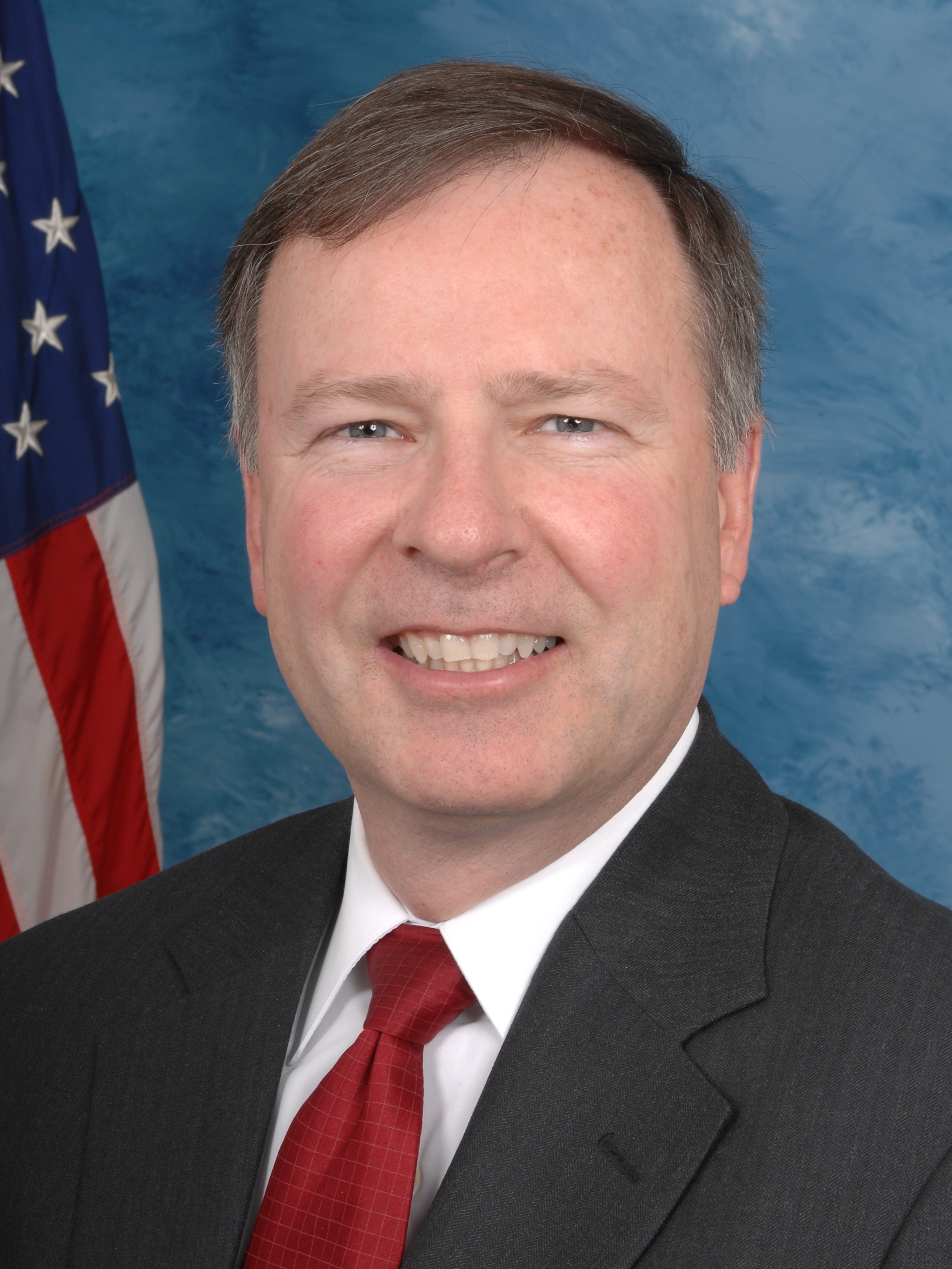

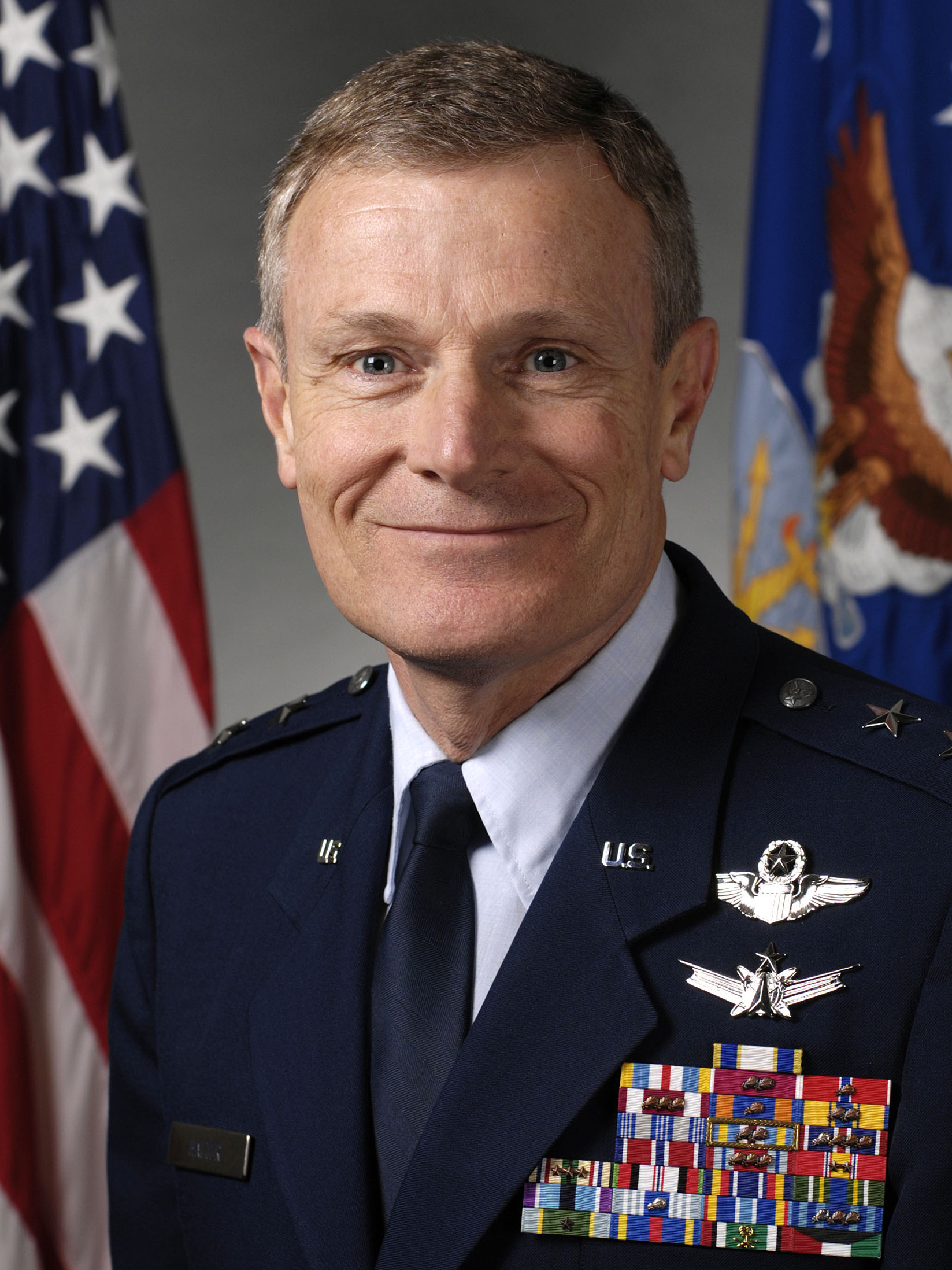
Nominee	Doug Lamborn	Irv Halter
Party	Republican	Democratic
Popular vote	199,639	105,673
Percentage	59.8%	40.2%
- County results Lamborn: 50–60% 60–70%
U.S. Representative before election
Doug Lamborn
Republican
Elected U.S. Representative
Doug Lamborn
Republican

The 5th district is located in Central Colorado and includes Fremont, El Paso, Teller and Chaffee counties and the city of Colorado Springs. The incumbent Republican Doug Lamborn, who had represented the district since 2007, ran for re-election. He was re-elected with 65% of the vote in 2012 and the district has a PVI of R+13.

=== Republican primary ===
==== Candidates ====
===== Nominee =====
- Doug Lamborn, incumbent U.S. Representative

===== Eliminated in primary =====
- Bentley Rayburn, retired Air Force Major General and candidate for this seat in 2006 and 2008

==== Primary results ====
Republican primary results
Party	Candidate	Votes	%
Republican	Doug Lamborn (incumbent)	38,741	52.6
Republican	Bentley Rayburn	34,967	47.4
Total votes		73,708	100.0

=== Democratic primary ===
==== Candidates ====
===== Nominee =====
- Irv Halter, retired Air Force Major General

==== Primary results ====
Democratic primary results
Party	Candidate	Votes	%
Democratic	Irv Halter	16,412	100.0

=== General election ===
==== Endorsements ====
Doug Lamborn (R)

Organizations

- Eagle Forum
Irv Halter (D)

Newspapers

- The Denver Post

==== Predictions ====
Source	Ranking	As of
The Cook Political Report	Safe R	November 3, 2014
Rothenberg	Safe R	October 24, 2014
Sabato's Crystal Ball	Safe R	October 30, 2014
RCP	Safe R	November 2, 2014
Daily Kos Elections	Safe R	November 4, 2014

==== Results ====
Colorado's 5th congressional district, 2014
Party	Candidate	Votes	%
Republican	Doug Lamborn (Incumbent)	157,182	59.8
Democratic	Irv Halter	105,673	40.2
Total votes		262,855	100.0
Republican hold			

== District 6 ==
2014 Colorado's 6th congressional district election
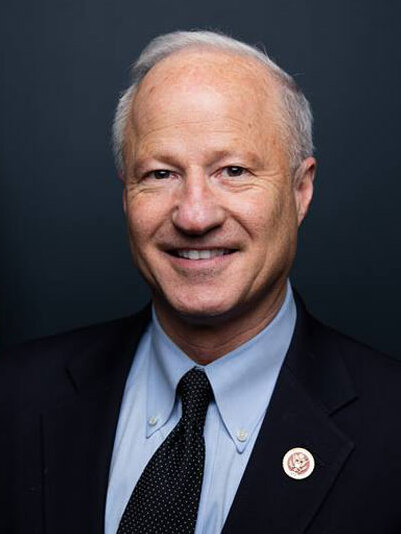

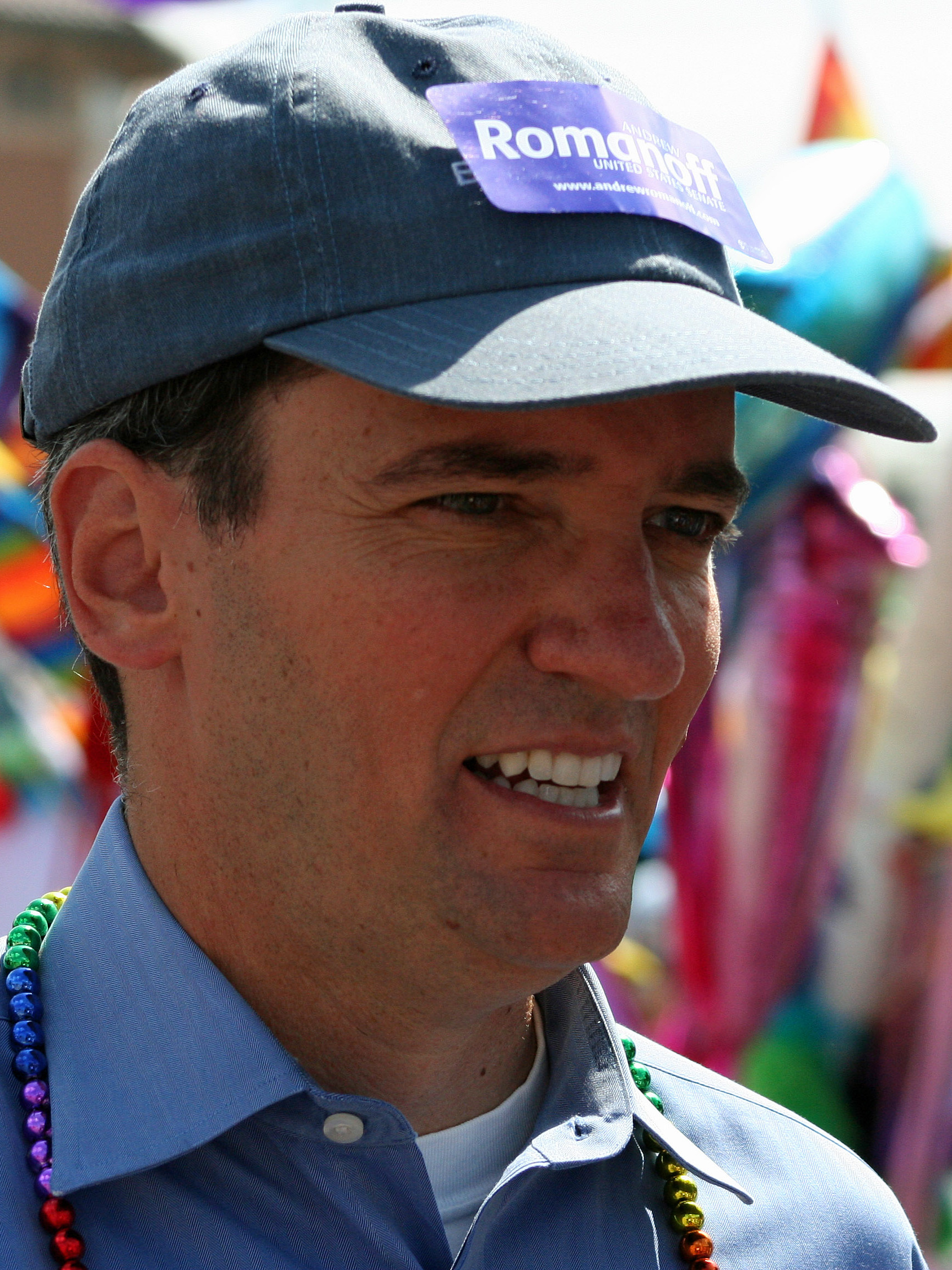
Nominee	Mike Coffman	Andrew Romanoff
Party	Republican	Democratic
Popular vote	143,467	118,847
Percentage	51.9%	43.0%
- County results Coffman: 40–50% 50–60% 60–70%
U.S. Representative before election
Mike Coffman
Republican
Elected U.S. Representative
Mike Coffman
Republican

The 6th district is located in Central Colorado and surrounds the city of Denver from the east, including the city of Aurora. The incumbent Republican Mike Coffman, who had represented the district since 2009, ran for re-election. He was re-elected with 48% of the vote in 2012 and the district has a PVI of D+1.

=== Republican primary ===
==== Candidates ====
===== Nominee =====
- Mike Coffman, incumbent U.S. Representative

==== Primary results ====
Republican primary results
Party	Candidate	Votes	%
Republican	Mike Coffman (incumbent)	43,737	100.0

=== Democratic primary ===
==== Candidates ====
===== Nominee =====
- Andrew Romanoff, former Speaker of the Colorado House of Representatives and candidate for the Senate in 2010

===== Declined =====
- Karen Middleton, former state representative
- Linda Newell, state senator

==== Primary results ====
Democratic primary results
Party	Candidate	Votes	%
Democratic	Andrew Romanoff	24,267	100.0

=== General election ===
==== Endorsements ====
Mike Coffman (R)

Organizations

- BIPAC
- National Federation of Independent Business
- National Republican Congressional Committee "Patriot" Program
- No Labels

Newspapers

- The Denver Post
Andrew Romanoff (D)

Organizations

- Democratic Congressional Campaign Committee "Red to Blue" Program

==== Debates ====
- Complete video of debate, September 23, 2012
- Complete video of debate, October 6, 2012

==== Polling ====
Poll source	Date(s) administered	Sample size	Margin of error	Mike Coffman (R)	Andrew Romanoff (D)	Other	Undecided
New York Times/CBS News Battleground Tracker	October 16–23, 2014	473	± 8.0%	43%	47%	0%	10%
Keating Research (D-Romanoff)	October 10–12, 2014	504	± 4.4%	44%	43%	4%	9%
DCCC (D)	October 2013	475	± 4.1%	42%	43%	—	15%

==== Predictions ====
Source	Ranking	As of
The Cook Political Report	Lean R	November 3, 2014
Rothenberg	Tilt R	October 24, 2014
Sabato's Crystal Ball	Lean R	October 30, 2014
RCP	Tossup	November 2, 2014
Daily Kos Elections	Tilt R	November 4, 2014

==== Results ====
Colorado's 6th congressional district, 2014
Party	Candidate	Votes	%
Republican	Mike Coffman (incumbent)	143,467	51.9
Democratic	Andrew Romanoff	118,847	43.0
Libertarian	Norm Olsen	8,623	3.1
Green	Gary Swing	5,503	2.0
Total votes		276,440	100.0
Republican hold			

== District 7 ==
2014 Colorado's 7th congressional district election
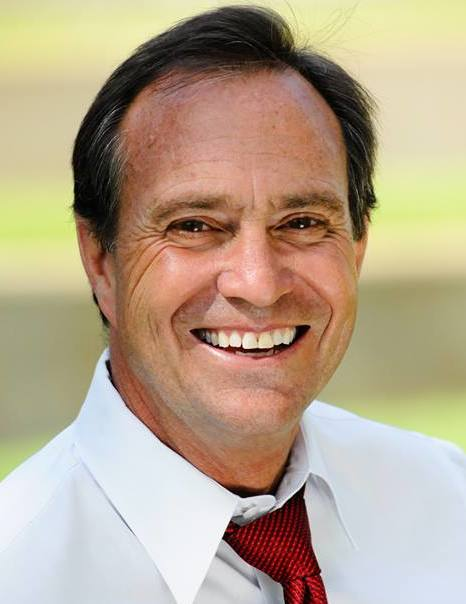

Nominee	Ed Perlmutter	Don Ytterberg
Party	Democratic	Republican
Popular vote	148,225	120,918
Percentage	55.1%	44.9%
- County results Perlmutter: 50–60%
U.S. Representative before election
Ed Perlmutter
Democratic
Elected U.S. Representative
Ed Perlmutter
Democratic

The 7th district is located in Central Colorado, to the north and west of Denver and includes the cities of Thornton and Westminster and most of Lakewood. The incumbent Democrat Ed Perlmutter, who has represented the district since 2007, ran for re-election. He was re-elected with 54% of the vote in 2012 and the district has a PVI of D+5.

=== Democratic primary ===
==== Candidates ====
===== Nominee =====
- Ed Perlmutter, incumbent U.S. Representative

==== Primary results ====
Democratic primary results
Party	Candidate	Votes	%
Democratic	Ed Perlmutter (incumbent)	30,659	100.0

=== Republican primary ===
==== Candidates ====
===== Nominee =====
- Don Ytterberg, former vice chairman of the Colorado Republican Party

==== Primary results ====
Republican primary results
Party	Candidate	Votes	%
Republican	Don Ytterberg	34,817	100.0

=== Libertarian primary ===
==== Candidates ====
===== Nominee =====
- Tyler Bagley

=== Constitution primary ===
==== Candidates ====
===== Nominee =====
- Douglas "Dayhorse" Campbell, perennial candidate

==== Primary results ====
American Constitution primary results
Party	Candidate	Votes	%
Constitution	Douglas 'Dayhorse' Campbell	127	100.0

=== General election ===
Neither Bagley or Campbell made the ballot.

==== Endorsements ====
Ed Perlmutter (D)

Newspapers

- The Denver Post
Don Ytterberg (R)

Organizations

- National Republican Congressional Committee "On the Radar" Program

==== Predictions ====
Source	Ranking	As of
The Cook Political Report	Safe D	November 3, 2014
Rothenberg	Safe D	October 24, 2014
Sabato's Crystal Ball	Safe D	October 30, 2014
RCP	Safe D	November 2, 2014
Daily Kos Elections	Safe D	November 4, 2014

==== Results ====
Colorado's 7th congressional district, 2014
Party	Candidate	Votes	%
Democratic	Ed Perlmutter (incumbent)	148,225	55.1
Republican	Don Ytterberg	120,918	44.9
Total votes		269,143	100.0
Democratic hold			

== See also ==
- 2014 United States House of Representatives elections
- 2014 United States elections
