= Buffy =

Buffy may refer to:

- Buffy (given name)
- Buffy the Vampire Slayer
- Buffy (album), a 1974 album by Buffy Sainte-Marie for MCA Records
- Buffy (color), a color often used in description of birds
- Buffy (dog), Russian President Vladimir Putin's dog
- Buffy coat, a component of blood
- Buffies, a power-up in the video game Brawl Stars
- Buffy Sainte-Marie, an American singer-songwriter and musician
- The Buffy EP, 1999 EP by Velvet Chain
- 2004 XR190, trans-Neptunian object, nicknamed Buffy

== See also ==
- Buffy the Vampire Slayer (disambiguation), various media and the character
