= 2020 United States presidential election in Colorado =

- November 3, 2020
- Turnout: 86.87% ▲12.48 pp

Nominee	Joe Biden	Donald Trump
Party	Democratic	Republican
Home state	Delaware	Florida
Running mate	Kamala Harris	Mike Pence
Electoral vote	9	0
Popular vote	1,804,352	1,364,607
Percentage	55.40%	41.90%

Biden
40–50%
50–60%
60–70%
70–80%
80–90%
90–100%
Trump
40–50%
50–60%
60–70%
70–80%
80–90%
90–100%
Tie/No data
President before election
Donald Trump
Republican
Elected President
Joe Biden
Democratic

The 2020 United States presidential election in Colorado was held on Tuesday, November 3, 2020, as part of the 2020 United States presidential election in which all 50 states plus the District of Columbia participated. Colorado voters chose electors to represent them in the Electoral College via a popular vote, pitting the Republican Party's nominee, incumbent President Donald Trump from Florida, and his running mate Vice President Mike Pence from Indiana, against Democratic Party nominee, former Vice President Joe Biden from Delaware, and his running mate, Senator Kamala Harris from California. Colorado had nine electoral votes in the Electoral College.

The Democratic National Committee (DNC) proposed Denver as a finalist to host the 2020 Democratic National Convention, but the city declined, citing conflicts. The Democrats had met in Denver in 1908 and 2008 Democratic National Convention. The DNC ultimately decided to hold the convention in Milwaukee, Wisconsin.

Prior to the election, all 14 news organizations considered Colorado a state Biden would win, or a likely blue state. On the day of the election, Biden won Colorado with over 55% of the vote, and by a victory margin of 13.50%, an 8.6 percentage point improvement on Hillary Clinton's victory in the state four years prior, the strongest Democratic performance since Lyndon B. Johnson in 1964, and the first time that it voted for a presidential candidate of either major party by a double-digit percentage since Ronald Reagan in 1984. Per exit polls by the Associated Press, changing demographics made Colorado more favorable to Democrats, with Latinos backing Biden with 68%, including Latinos of Mexican heritage with 75%. Biden also carried Whites with 53%. 69% of voters favored increasing federal government spending on green and renewable energy, and they favored Biden by 76%–23%.

Biden flipped three counties in Colorado: Pueblo County, which had been reliably Democratic before narrowly backing Trump in 2016; Chaffee County, one of the few counties to flip from John McCain in 2008 to Barack Obama in 2012; and Garfield County, which had last voted Democratic when Bill Clinton won it in 1992. Biden also significantly closed the gap in the GOP's two largest remaining strongholds in the state, El Paso County and Douglas County, becoming the first Democrat to win more than 40% of the vote in the former since 1964 and closing the gap in the latter to single digits for the first time since 1964. Trump became the first Republican since William McKinley in 1900 to lose Colorado in multiple presidential elections. Nevertheless, Biden became the first Democrat since Grover Cleveland in 1892 to win the White House without carrying Conejos County, as well as the first since Woodrow Wilson in 1912 to do so without carrying Huerfano or Las Animas Counties. Trump also narrowly flipped Alamosa County, one of only fifteen counties nationwide that flipped from Hillary Clinton in 2016 to Trump in 2020, thereby making Biden the first Democratic president to be elected without carrying this county since Jimmy Carter in 1976.

This marked the first time since 1968 that Colorado voted more Democratic than neighboring New Mexico. Biden carried New Mexico by 10.79%, 2.71 points lower than Colorado.

== Primary elections ==
The primary elections were held on Super Tuesday, March 3, 2020.

=== Republican primary ===
The Republican primary was due to be canceled until Robert Ardini, a retired advertising executive, decided to submit his name for the ballot. Several others subsequently joined him.

2020 Colorado Republican presidential primary
Candidate	Votes	%	Estimated delegates
Donald Trump (incumbent)	628,876	92.26	37
Bill Weld	25,698	3.77	0
Joe Walsh (withdrawn)	13,072	1.92	0
Matthew John Matern	7,239	1.06	0
Robert Ardini	3,388	0.50	0
Zoltan Istvan	3,350	0.49	0
Total	681,623	100%	37

=== Democratic primary ===
The results were certified on March 30. The race was called for Bernie Sanders who won a plurality of votes and delegates.

2020 Colorado Democratic presidential primary
Candidate	Votes	%	Delegates
Bernie Sanders	355,293	37.00	29 (Note: 24 delegates, if Bloomberg's and Warren's statewide delegates would have been calculated.)
Joe Biden	236,565	24.64	21 (Note: 17 delegates, if Bloomberg's and Warren's statewide delegates would have been calculated.)
Michael Bloomberg	177,727	18.51	9 (Note: 14 delegates, if Bloomberg's and Warren's statewide delegates would have been calculated.)
Elizabeth Warren	168,695	17.57	8 (Note: 12 delegates, if Bloomberg's and Warren's statewide delegates would have been calculated.)
Tulsi Gabbard	10,037	1.05	
Andrew Yang (withdrawn)	3,988	0.42	
Tom Steyer (withdrawn) (Note: Candidate withdrew shortly before the primary and after the start of early in-person voting.)	3,323	0.35	
Cory Booker (withdrawn)	1,276	0.13	
Marianne Williamson (withdrawn)	1,086	0.11	
Deval Patrick (withdrawn)	227	0.02	
Other candidates	1,911	0.20	
Total	960,128	100%	67

=== Libertarian nominee ===
- Jo Jorgensen, Psychology Senior Lecturer at Clemson University

== General election ==
=== Predictions ===
Source	Ranking	As of
The Cook Political Report	Likely D	November 3, 2020
Inside Elections	Solid D	November 3, 2020
Sabato's Crystal Ball	Likely D	November 3, 2020
Politico	Likely D	November 3, 2020
RCP	Lean D	November 3, 2020
Niskanen	Safe D	November 3, 2020
CNN	Lean D	November 3, 2020
The Economist	Safe D	November 3, 2020
CBS News	Likely D	November 3, 2020
270towin	Likely D	November 3, 2020
ABC News	Solid D	November 3, 2020
NPR	Likely D	November 3, 2020
NBC News	Likely D	November 3, 2020
538	Solid D	November 3, 2020

=== Polling ===
View source data.

==== Aggregate polls ====
Source of poll aggregation	Dates administered	Dates updated	Joe Biden Democratic	Donald Trump Republican	Other/ Undecided (Note: Calculated by taking the difference of 100% and all other candidates combined.)	Margin
270 to Win	October 15 – November 2, 2020	November 3, 2020	52.0%	40.6%	7.4%	Biden +11.4
FiveThirtyEight	until November 2, 2020	November 3, 2020	53.6%	41.1%	5.3%	Biden +12.5
Average			52.8%	40.8%	6.4%	Biden +12.0

==== Polls ====
Poll source	Date(s) administered	Sample size (Note: Key: A – all adults RV – registered voters LV – likely voters V – unclear)	Margin of error	Donald Trump Republican	Joe Biden Democratic	Jo Jorgensen Libertarian	Howie Hawkins Green	Other	Undecided
SurveyMonkey/Axios	Oct 20 – Nov 2, 2020	2,991 (LV)	± 2.5%	44% (Note: Overlapping sample with the previous SurveyMonkey/Axios poll, but more information available regarding sample size)	55%	–	–	–	–
Keating Research/Onsight Public Affairs/Colorado Sun	Oct 29 – Nov 1, 2020	502 (LV) (Note: Additional data sourced from FiveThirtyEight)	± 4.4%	41%	53%	–	–	–	–
Data for Progress	Oct 27 – Nov 1, 2020	709 (LV)	± 3.7%	42%	54%	3%	1%	0% (Note: "Other candidate or write-in" with 0%)	–
Swayable	Oct 23 – Nov 1, 2020	455 (LV)	± 6%	41%	55%	3%	1%	–	–
Morning Consult	Oct 22–31, 2020	727 (LV)	± 4%	41%	54%	–	–	–	–
SurveyMonkey/Axios	Oct 1–28, 2020	5,925 (LV)	–	40%	59%	–	–	–	–
Morning Consult	Oct 11–20, 2020	788 (LV)	± 3.5%	39%	55%	–	–	–	–
RBI Strategies	Oct 12–16, 2020	502 (LV)	± 4.4%	38%	55%	3%	1%	1% (Note: "Someone else" with 3%)	1%
RMG Research/PoliticalIQ	Oct 9–15, 2020	800 (LV)	± 3.5%	43%	51%	–	–	1% (Note: "Some other candidate" with 1%)	3%
Civiqs/Daily Kos	Oct 11–14, 2020	1,013 (LV)	± 3.6%	42%	53%	–	–	3%	1%
Keating Research/OnSight Public Affairs/Melanson	Oct 8–13, 2020	519 (LV)	± 4.3%	39%	54%	–	–	3% (Note: "Other candidate" with 3%)	4%
Morning Consult	Oct 2–11, 2020	837 (LV)	± 3.4%	40%	54%	–	–	–	–
YouGov/University of Colorado	Oct 5–9, 2020	800 (LV)	± 4.64%	38%	47%	–	–	3%	11%
SurveyUSA/9News/Colorado Politics	Oct 1–6, 2020	1,021 (LV)	± 3.9%	40%	50%	–	–	5% (Note: "Some other candidate" with 5%)	4%
SurveyMonkey/Axios	Sep 1–30, 2020	2,717 (LV)	–	41%	57%	–	–	–	2%
Morning Consult	Aug 29 – Sep 7, 2020	657 (LV)	± (2%–4%)	43% (Note: Overlapping sample with the previous Morning Consult poll, but more information available regarding sample size)	49%	–	–	–	–
Fabrizio Ward/Hart Research Associates/AARP	Aug 30 – Sep 5, 2020	800 (LV)	± 3.5%	40%	50%	–	–	2% (Note: Would not vote with 2%)	8%
Global Strategy Group/Progress Colorado (Note: Poll sponsored by a pro-Affordable Care Act organization)	Aug 28 – Sep 1, 2020	800 (LV)	± 3.5%	39%	50%	4%	1%	1% (Note: West (B) with 1%)	4%
SurveyMonkey/Axios	Aug 1–31, 2020	2,385 (LV)	–	41%	57%	–	–	–	2%
Morning Consult	Aug 21–30, 2020	638 (LV)	± 4%	41%	51%	–	–	–	–
Morning Consult	Aug 16–25, 2020	~600 (LV)	± 4.0%	42%	51%	–	–	–	–
Morning Consult	Aug 7–16, 2020	601 (LV)	± 4%	41% (Note: Overlapping sample with the previous and subsequent Morning Consult polls, but more information available regarding sample size)	51%	–	–	–	–
Morning Consult	Aug 6–15, 2020	~600 (LV)	± 4.0%	41%	51%	–	–	–	–
Morning Consult	Jul 7 – Aug 5, 2020	~600 (LV)	± 4.0%	40%	52%	–	–	–	–
SurveyMonkey/Axios	Jul 1–31, 2020	2,337 (LV)	–	40%	58%	–	–	–	2%
Morning Consult	Jul 17–26, 2020	616 (LV)	± 4.0%	39%	52%	–	–	–	–
Morning Consult	Jul 13–22, 2020	~600 (LV)	± 4.0%	41%	51%	–	–	–	–
Public Policy Polling/AFSCME (Note: AFSCME endorsed Biden prior to this poll's sampling period)	Jul 23–24, 2020	891 (V)	–	41%	54%	–	–	–	5%
Public Policy Polling/End Citizens United	Jun 29–30, 2020	840 (V)	± 3.4%	39%	56%	–	–	–	5%
SurveyMonkey/Axios	Jun 8–30, 2020	1,088 (LV)	–	42%	57%	–	–	–	2%
Morning Consult	May 17–26, 2020	572 (LV)	–	42%	50%	–	–	–	–
Global Strategy Group (D)	May 7–11, 2020	700 (RV)	± 3.5%	40%	53%	–	–	–	7%
Keating Research/OnSight Public Affairs/Melanson/Colorado Politics	May 1–3, 2020	600 (LV)	± 4%	36%	55%	–	–	3%	6%
Montana State University Bozeman	Apr 10–19, 2020	379 (LV)	–	35%	53%	–	–	3%	8%
Climate Nexus	Feb 11–15, 2020	485 (RV)	± 4.5%	43%	46%	–	–	–	11%
Emerson College	Aug 16–19, 2019	1,000 (RV)	± 3.0%	45%	55%	–	–	–	–
Fabrizio Ward/AARP	Jul 29–31, 2019	600 (LV)	± 4.0%	42%	51%	–	–	1% (Note: Would not vote/would not vote for president with 1%)	5%

Former candidates

Donald Trump vs. Michael Bloomberg

Poll source	Date(s) administered	Sample size	Margin of error	Donald Trump (R)	Michael Bloomberg (D)	Undecided
Climate Nexus	Feb 11–15, 2020	485 (RV)	± 4.5%	42%	45%	13%

Donald Trump vs. Pete Buttigieg

Poll source	Date(s) administered	Sample size	Margin of error	Donald Trump (R)	Pete Buttigieg (D)	Undecided
Climate Nexus	Feb 11–15, 2020	485 (RV)	± 4.5%	42%	45%	13%
Emerson College	Aug 16–19, 2019	1,000 (RV)	± 3.0%	45%	55%	–

with Donald Trump and Kamala Harris

Poll source	Date(s) administered	Sample size	Margin of error	Donald Trump (R)	Kamala Harris (D)	Undecided
Emerson College	Aug 16–19, 2019	1,000 (RV)	± 3.0%	48%	51%	–

Donald Trump vs. Amy Klobuchar

Poll source	Date(s) administered	Sample size	Margin of error	Donald Trump (R)	Amy Klobuchar (D)	Undecided
Climate Nexus	Feb 11–15, 2020	485 (RV)	± 4.5%	43%	43%	14%

Donald Trump vs. Bernie Sanders

Poll source	Date(s) administered	Sample size	Margin of error	Donald Trump (R)	Bernie Sanders (D)	Undecided
Climate Nexus	Feb 11–15, 2020	485 (RV)	± 4.5%	43%	48%	9%
Emerson College	Aug 16–19, 2019	1,000 (RV)	± 3.0%	45%	55%	–

Donald Trump vs. Elizabeth Warren

Poll source	Date(s) administered	Sample size	Margin of error	Donald Trump (R)	Elizabeth Warren (D)	Undecided
Climate Nexus	Feb 11–15, 2020	485 (RV)	± 4.5%	45%	44%	11%
Emerson College	Aug 16–19, 2019	1,000 (RV)	± 3.0%	47%	54%	–

Hypothetical polling

Donald Trump vs. Generic Democrat

Poll source	Date(s) administered	Sample size	Margin of error	Donald Trump (R)	Generic Democrat	Other	Undecided
Magellan Strategies	Jul 15–17, 2019	500 (LV)	± 4.4%	32%	44%	15%	9%
Magellan Strategies	Mar 11–13, 2019	500 (LV)	± 4.4%	33%	40%	16%	10%
Global Strategy Group	Jan 31 – Feb 4, 2019	818 (RV)	± 3.4%	40%	52%	–	8%
DFM Research	Jan 2–5, 2019	550 (A)	± 4.2%	36%	50%	–	14%

=== Results ===
2020 United States presidential election in Colorado
Party	Candidate	Votes	%	±%
Democratic	Joe Biden Kamala Harris	1,804,352	55.40%	+7.28%
Republican	Donald Trump Mike Pence	1,364,607	41.90%	−1.41%
Libertarian	Jo Jorgensen Spike Cohen	52,460	1.61%	−3.56%
Green	Howie Hawkins Angela Walker	8,986	0.28%	−1.09%
Independent	Kanye West Michelle Tidball	8,089	0.25%	N/A
American Constitution	Don Blankenship William Mohr	5,061	0.16%	−0.26%
Unity	Bill Hammons Eric Bodenstab	2,730	0.08%	N/A
American Solidarity	Brian Carroll Amar Patel	2,515	0.08%	+0.05%
Independent	Mark Charles Adrian Wallace	2,011	0.06%	N/A
Socialism and Liberation	Gloria La Riva Sunil Freeman	1,035	0.03%	+0.01%
Independent American	Kyle Kopitke Nathan Sorenson	762	0.02%	−0.02%
Alliance	Rocky De La Fuente Darcy Richardson	636	0.02%	−0.02%
Independent	Joe McHugh Elizabeth Storm	614	0.02%	N/A
Independent	Brock Pierce Karla Ballard	572	0.02%	N/A
Prohibition	Phil Collins Billy Joe Parker	568	0.02%	+0.01%
Independent	Princess Khadijah Jacob-Fambro Khadijah Jacob Sr.	495	0.02%	N/A
Progressive	Dario Hunter Dawn Neptune Adams	379	0.01%	N/A
Approval Voting	Blake Huber Frank Atwood	355	0.01%	±0.00
Socialist Workers	Alyson Kennedy Malcolm Jarrett	354	0.01%	−0.01%
Socialist Equality	Joseph Kishore Norissa Santa Cruz	196	0.01%	N/A
Independent	Jordan "Cancer" Scott Jennifer Tepool	175	0.01%	N/A
Independent	Tom Hoefling Andy Prior	24	0.00%	N/A
Independent	Todd Cella Timothy Cella	4	0.00%	N/A
Total votes		3,256,980	100.00%	

==== By county ====
County	Joe Biden Democratic		Donald Trump Republican		Various candidates Other parties		Margin		Total votes cast
County	#	%	#	%	#	%	#	%	Total votes cast
Adams	134,202	56.69%	95,657	40.41%	6,881	2.90%	38,545	16.28%	236,740
Alamosa	3,759	48.14%	3,813	48.83%	236	3.03%	-54	-0.69%	7,808
Arapahoe	213,607	61.00%	127,323	36.36%	9,253	2.64%	86,284	24.64%	350,183
Archuleta	3,738	40.88%	5,189	56.75%	217	2.37%	-1,451	-15.87%	9,144
Baca	317	14.25%	1,867	83.91%	41	1.84%	-1,550	-69.66%	2,225
Bent	732	32.19%	1,503	66.09%	39	1.72%	-771	-33.90%	2,274
Boulder	159,089	77.19%	42,501	20.62%	4,521	2.19%	116,588	56.57%	206,111
Broomfield	29,077	62.35%	16,295	34.94%	1,260	2.71%	12,782	27.41%	46,632
Chaffee	7,160	52.19%	6,222	45.36%	336	2.45%	938	6.83%	13,718
Cheyenne	131	11.53%	993	87.41%	12	1.06%	-862	-75.88%	1,136
Clear Creek	3,604	55.04%	2,754	42.06%	190	2.90%	850	11.98%	6,548
Conejos	1,959	45.21%	2,286	52.76%	88	2.03%	-327	-7.55%	4,333
Costilla	1,311	62.61%	741	35.39%	42	2.00%	570	27.22%	2,094
Crowley	437	24.97%	1,271	72.63%	42	2.40%	-834	-47.66%	1,750
Custer	1,112	30.59%	2,474	68.06%	49	1.35%	-1,362	-37.47%	3,635
Delta	5,887	30.39%	13,081	67.53%	402	2.08%	-7,194	-37.14%	19,370
Denver	313,293	79.55%	71,618	18.19%	8,918	2.26%	241,675	61.36%	393,829
Dolores	341	23.53%	1,089	75.16%	19	1.31%	-748	-51.63%	1,449
Douglas	104,653	45.19%	121,270	52.36%	5,682	2.45%	-16,617	-7.17%	231,605
Eagle	18,588	63.79%	9,892	33.95%	660	2.26%	8,696	29.84%	29,140
El Paso	161,941	42.75%	202,828	53.54%	14,082	3.71%	-40,887	-10.79%	378,851
Elbert	4,490	23.65%	14,027	73.89%	466	2.46%	-9,537	-50.24%	18,983
Fremont	7,369	28.83%	17,517	68.54%	671	2.63%	-10,148	-39.71%	25,557
Garfield	15,427	49.92%	14,717	47.62%	760	2.46%	710	2.30%	30,904
Gilpin	2,223	53.11%	1,833	43.79%	130	3.10%	390	9.32%	4,186
Grand	4,710	47.72%	4,883	49.47%	277	2.81%	-173	-1.75%	9,870
Gunnison	7,132	63.74%	3,735	33.38%	323	2.88%	3,397	30.36%	11,190
Hinsdale	255	40.35%	353	55.85%	24	3.80%	-98	-15.50%	632
Huerfano	2,076	47.12%	2,203	50.00%	127	2.88%	-127	-2.88%	4,406
Jackson	175	19.98%	681	77.74%	20	2.28%	-506	-57.76%	876
Jefferson	218,396	57.88%	148,417	39.33%	10,545	2.79%	69,979	18.55%	377,358
Kiowa	98	10.85%	795	88.04%	10	1.11%	-697	-77.19%	903
Kit Carson	662	17.10%	3,144	81.22%	65	1.68%	-2,482	-64.12%	3,871
La Plata	20,548	57.61%	14,233	39.91%	886	2.48%	6,315	17.70%	35,667
Lake	2,303	58.14%	1,497	37.79%	161	4.07%	806	20.35%	3,961
Larimer	126,120	56.22%	91,489	40.78%	6,729	3.00%	34,631	15.44%	224,338
Las Animas	3,497	43.93%	4,284	53.81%	180	2.26%	-787	-9.88%	7,961
Lincoln	470	17.73%	2,135	80.54%	46	1.73%	-1,665	-62.81%	2,651
Logan	2,218	21.06%	8,087	76.79%	227	2.15%	-5,869	-55.73%	10,532
Mesa	31,536	34.80%	56,894	62.78%	2,193	2.42%	-25,358	-27.98%	90,623
Mineral	317	41.93%	427	56.48%	12	1.59%	-110	-14.55%	756
Moffat	1,203	17.12%	5,670	80.70%	153	2.18%	-4,467	-63.58%	7,026
Montezuma	5,836	37.65%	9,306	60.04%	358	2.31%	-3,470	-22.39%	15,500
Montrose	7,687	30.84%	16,770	67.29%	465	1.87%	-9,083	-36.45%	24,922
Morgan	3,876	28.20%	9,593	68.80%	275	2.00%	-5,717	-41.60%	13,744
Otero	3,605	37.65%	5,756	60.11%	215	2.24%	-2,151	-22.46%	9,576
Ouray	2,365	58.83%	1,577	39.23%	78	1.94%	788	19.60%	4,020
Park	4,903	39.89%	6,991	56.88%	397	3.23%	-2,088	-16.99%	12,291
Phillips	486	19.56%	1,958	78.79%	41	1.65%	-1,472	-59.23%	2,485
Pitkin	8,989	75.18%	2,780	23.25%	188	1.57%	6,209	51.93%	11,957
Prowers	1,458	26.22%	4,008	72.07%	95	1.71%	-2,550	-45.85%	5,561
Pueblo	43,772	49.57%	42,252	47.85%	2,277	2.58%	1,520	1.72%	88,301
Rio Blanco	561	15.20%	3,061	82.93%	69	1.87%	-2,500	-67.73%	3,691
Rio Grande	2,495	39.57%	3,660	58.05%	150	2.38%	-1,165	-18.48%	6,305
Routt	10,582	62.70%	5,925	35.11%	369	2.19%	4,657	27.59%	16,876
Saguache	1,884	55.59%	1,413	41.69%	92	2.72%	471	13.90%	3,389
San Juan	342	60.85%	202	35.94%	18	3.21%	140	24.91%	562
San Miguel	3,924	76.24%	1,136	22.07%	87	1.69%	2,788	54.17%	5,147
Sedgwick	301	20.82%	1,121	77.52%	24	1.66%	-820	-56.70%	1,446
Summit	12,631	68.35%	5,322	28.80%	526	2.85%	7,309	39.55%	18,479
Teller	5,278	31.16%	11,241	66.36%	420	2.48%	-5,963	-35.20%	16,939
Washington	369	12.27%	2,595	86.27%	44	1.46%	-2,226	-74.00%	3,008
Weld	66,060	39.56%	96,145	57.58%	4,769	2.86%	-30,085	-18.02%	166,974
Yuma	785	15.76%	4,107	82.45%	89	1.79%	-3,322	-66.69%	4,981
Totals	1,804,352	55.40%	1,364,607	41.90%	88,021	2.70%	439,745	13.50%	3,256,980

Counties that flipped from Republican to Democratic

- Chaffee (largest municipality: Salida)
- Garfield (largest municipality: Glenwood Springs)
- Pueblo (largest municipality: Pueblo)

Counties that flipped from Democratic to Republican

- Alamosa (largest municipality: Alamosa)

==== By congressional district ====
Biden won four out of the seven congressional districts in Colorado.

District	Trump	Biden	Representative
1st	22%	76%	Diana DeGette
2nd	34%	64%	Joe Neguse
3rd	52%	46%	Scott Tipton
3rd	52%	46%	Lauren Boebert
4th	57%	41%	Ken Buck
5th	55%	42%	Doug Lamborn
6th	39%	58%	Jason Crow
7th	37%	60%	Ed Perlmutter

== Analysis ==
In this election, Colorado weighed in as 9.1% more Democratic than the nation as a whole. The results established Colorado as a Democratic stronghold, rather than the Democratic-leaning battleground state it had been for the past three election cycles and previously a Republican leaning state, as Trump became the first Republican incumbent since William Howard Taft to consecutively lose the state between elections. With Biden's win, Colorado voted Democratic at the presidential level four times in a row for the first time since statehood, the state having previously voted for Barack Obama in 2008 and 2012 and for Hillary Clinton in 2016.

Unlike Virginia, another Republican-leaning turned battleground state that also voted Democratic by double digits for the first time in decades at the presidential level in 2020, Colorado's status as a blue state would hold up following the 2022 midterms, in which Democrats won every statewide office by double digits, and expanded their majorities in the state legislature. This would stand in contrast to Virginia in 2021, which saw Republicans win all three elected offices and the lower house.

=== Edison exit polls ===
2020 presidential election in Colorado by demographic subgroup (Edison exit polling)
Demographic subgroup	Biden	Trump	% of total vote
Total vote	55.40	41.90	100
Ideology
Liberals	95	4	29
Moderates	65	30	38
Conservatives	8	91	32
Party
Democrats	98	2	29
Republicans	7	91	25
Independents	55	40	46
Gender
Men	49	47	46
Women	61	37	54
Race/ethnicity
White	57	41	79
Black	–	–	3
Latino	58	38	12
Asian	–	–	2
Other	–	–	4
Age
18–29 years old	70	26	16
30–44 years old	55	40	25
45–64 years old	48	49	35
65 and older	57	42	25
Sexual orientation
LGBT	–	–	6
Not LGBT	55	42	94
Education
High school or less	43	55	14
Some college education	53	45	24
Associate degree	48	49	18
Bachelor's degree	57	39	25
Postgraduate degree	73	25	19
Issue regarded as most important
Racial inequality	90	8	15
Coronavirus	91	8	20
Economy	11	86	32
Crime and safety	13	83	9
Health care	85	13	15
Region
East	41	56	18
Denver/Eastern suburbs	67	30	30
Northern suburbs	59	38	20
Southern suburbs	53	44	19
Colorado Rockies	46	52	13
Area type
Urban	63	35	38
Suburban	54	43	48
Rural	40	57	14
Family's financial situation today
Better than four years ago	23	75	39
Worse than four years ago	84	10	17
About the same	74	24	43

== Notes ==
Partisan clients

== See also ==
- United States presidential elections in Colorado
- 2020 Colorado elections
- 2020 United States presidential election
- 2020 Democratic Party presidential primaries
- 2020 Republican Party presidential primaries
- 2020 United States elections
