= Brianna Buentello =

American politician from Colorado

Bri Buentello
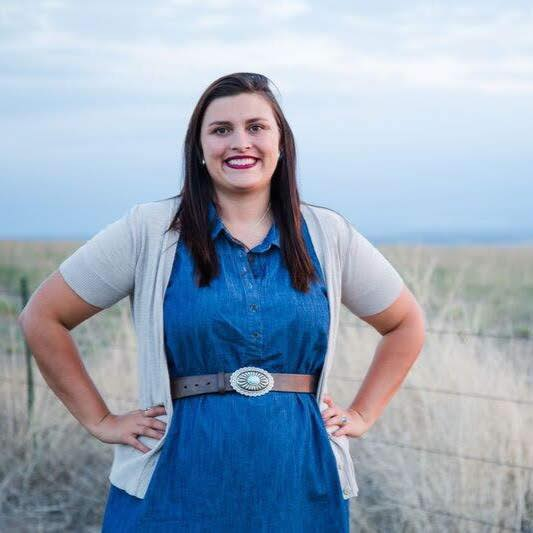

Member of the Colorado House of Representatives from the 47th district
- In office January 4, 2019 – January 13, 2021
- Preceded by: Judy Reyher
- Succeeded by: Stephanie Luck

Personal details
- Born: September 21, 1989 (age 36)
- Party: Democratic
- Education: Northern Michigan University
- Occupation: Teacher

Brianna Buentello (born September 21, 1989) is an American politician and former member of the Colorado House of Representatives. A Democrat, she represented the 47th district, which includes parts of Fremont and Pueblo counties and all of Otero County, for one term. She served on the Rural Affairs and Agriculture Committee, and was the vice-chair of the Education Committee.

She is married to state senator Nick Hinrichsen. In 2022, the couple were important supporters of Adam Frisch in his campaign for US House of Representatives.

== Political career ==
Buentello was elected in the general election on November 6, 2018, receiving 50.5% of the vote over 49.5% of Republican candidate Don Bendell. She succeeded Judy Reyher, who was appointed to the position when Clarice Navarro, the previous incumbent, was appointed to serve in the Trump Administration.

In the November 2020 general election, Buentello was defeated by Republican challenger Stephanie Luck. Luck garnered 54.15% of the vote to Buentello's 45.85%.
