= Don Bendell =

American novelist

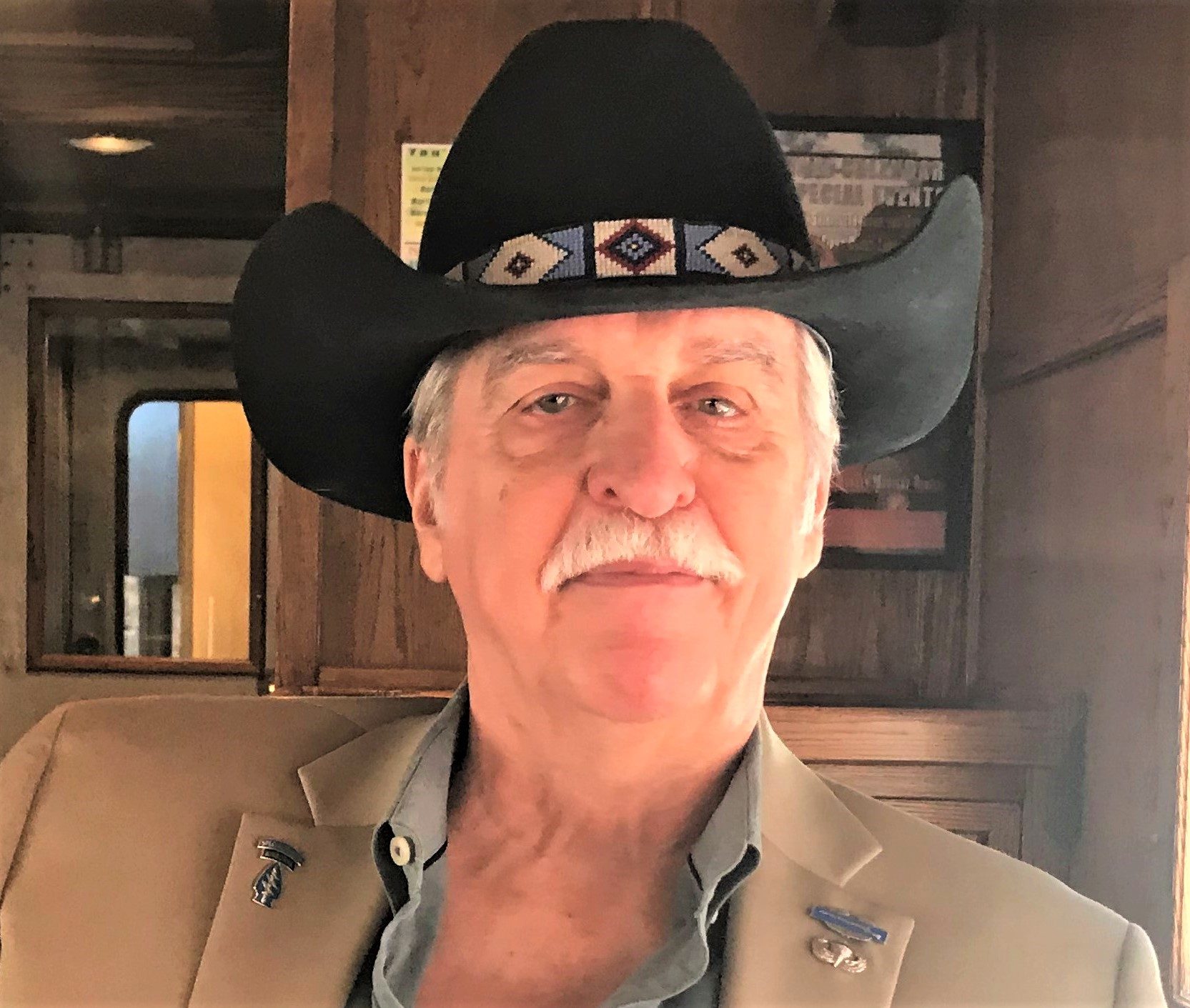
- Born: January 8, 1947 (age 79); Akron, Ohio, U.S.
- Education: Colorado Christian University (BS); Grand Canyon University (MS)
- Occupations: Author; karate instructor; cowboy; rancher
- Spouse: Janet S. Barbera Sullivan Bendell
- Children: 6
- Writing career
- Genres: Western, war, military thriller, history, romance, science fiction, biography, memoir

Don Bendell (born January 8, 1947) is an American author, rancher, tracker, and Vietnam combat veteran. He has published 31 books and assisted in exposing former Atlantic City Mayor Bob Levy's claims of serving as a Green Beret as false.

Bendell was born in Akron, Ohio, and has had his work published in The American Spectator. Bendell is a grand master instructor in five martial arts, and is a 1995 inductee into the International Karate & Kickboxing Hall of Fame.

== Education ==
Bendell has a Bachelor of Science in business from Colorado Christian University and a Master of Science in business from the Ken Blanchard College of Business in Grand Canyon University.

== Politics ==
In November 2016, Bendell spoke and was master of ceremonies at the largest rally in Colorado introducing Republican presidential nominee Donald Trump. One week earlier he was an Emcee and introduced Eric J. Trump at Colorado Christian University in Denver.

In 2018, Bendell ran as a Republican for the Colorado House of Representatives and was narrowly defeated by his Democratic opponent, Brianna Buentello.

== Bibliography ==
=== Fiction ===
==== Chief of Scouts series ====
- Chief of Scouts (1995)
- Horse Soldiers (1995)
- Colt (1995)
- Justis Colt (1995)
- Matched Colts (1997)
- Blazing Colts (1999)
- Coyote Run (1995)
- Warrior (1995)
- Eagle (1995)
- War Bonnet (2002)

==== Criminal Investigation Detachment ====
- Criminal Investigation Detachment (2006)
- Broken Borders (2006)
- Bamboo Battleground (2007)

==== Strongheart series ====
- Strongheart: A Story of the Old West (2011)
- Blood Feather (2013)
- The Indian Ring (2016)
- The Rider of Phantom Canyon (2016)

==== Military Thriller ====
- Detachment Delta (2009)

==== Science fiction ====
Don Bendell writing under the pen name Ron Stillman

- Tracker (1990)
- Tracker 2: Green Lightning (1990)
- Tracker 3: Blood Money (1991)
- Tracker 4: Black Phantom (1991)
- Tracker 5: Firekill (1991)
- Tracker 6: Death Hunt (1991)

=== Non-fiction ===
- Crossbow (1990)
- The B-52 Overture (1992)
- Valley of Tears (1993)
- Snake Eater: Characters in and Stories about the U. S. Army Special Forces in Vietnam (1994)
- VALLEY OF TEARS: Assault Into the Plei Trap Valley (2010)
- Tracks of Hope: A Memoir (2011)
- Real Men are Cowboys and Women Love Them co-written with Dr. Janet Bendell (2019)
