= Melançon =

Melançon is a French surname which is often spelled Mélançon, Melancon or Melanson in English. Notable people with the surname include:

- André Melançon (1942–2016), Canadian actor, screenwriter and film director
- Charlie Melançon (born 1947), U. S. representative for Louisiana
- Claude Mélançon (1895–1973), Canadian naturalist, lecturer and author (novelist and journalist)
- Gerard Melancon (born 1967), American thoroughbred jockey
- Isabelle Melançon, Canadian politician
- Joliane Melançon (born 1986), Canadian judoka
- Larry Melancon (1955–2021), American thoroughbred jockey
- Mark Melancon (born 1985), American professional baseball pitcher
- Meiling Melançon (born 1980), American actress, writer, director and producer
- Pierre-Yves Melançon, Canadian politician
- Robert Melançon (born 1947), Canadian writer
- Tucker L. Melancon (born 1946), American judge
- Rydell Melancon (born 1962), American football player

== See also ==
- Claude-Mélançon Ecological Reserve, in Québec
- Melançon Arena, an indoor arena located in Saint-Jérôme, Québec
- Melanson
