= Keith Swerdfeger =

American politician

Keith R. Swerdfeger

Member of the Colorado House of Representatives from the 47th district
- In office January 12, 2011 – January 9, 2013
- Preceded by: Buffie McFadyen
- Succeeded by: Clarice Navarro

Personal details
- Born: 1947 (age 78–79) Long Beach, California, U.S.
- Party: Republican
- Spouse: Sharon
- Profession: Businessman

Keith Swerdfeger (born 1947) is a businessman and Republican politician from Colorado, U.S. He served in the Colorado House of Representatives for one two-year term, from January 2011 to January 2013.

== Elections ==
Swerdfeger first ran for a seat in the Colorado House of Representatives to represent District 47 in 2004. At that time, the district included parts of Pueblo, Fremont, and Otero counties. In that election, he was defeated by incumbent Democrat Buffie McFadyen, who went on to serve a total of four terms in the State House. Term limited, she did not seek re-election in 2010. Swerdfeger again ran to represent District 47 in 2010 and was successful, defeating Democrat Carole L. Partin 62.8% to 37.2%. He did not seek re-election in 2012.

== Swerdfeger Construction ==
Swerdfeger and his wife Sharon founded K.R. Swerdfeger Construction in Pueblo West, Colorado in 1968. The company specialized in underground utilities, specifically, laying and maintaining water, sewer, gas, and electrical lines underground. By the time the firm was sold in 2021, it had 350 employees and operated in several states. Artera Services bought K.R. Swerdfeger Construction in June 2021.
