= Buffy (given name) =

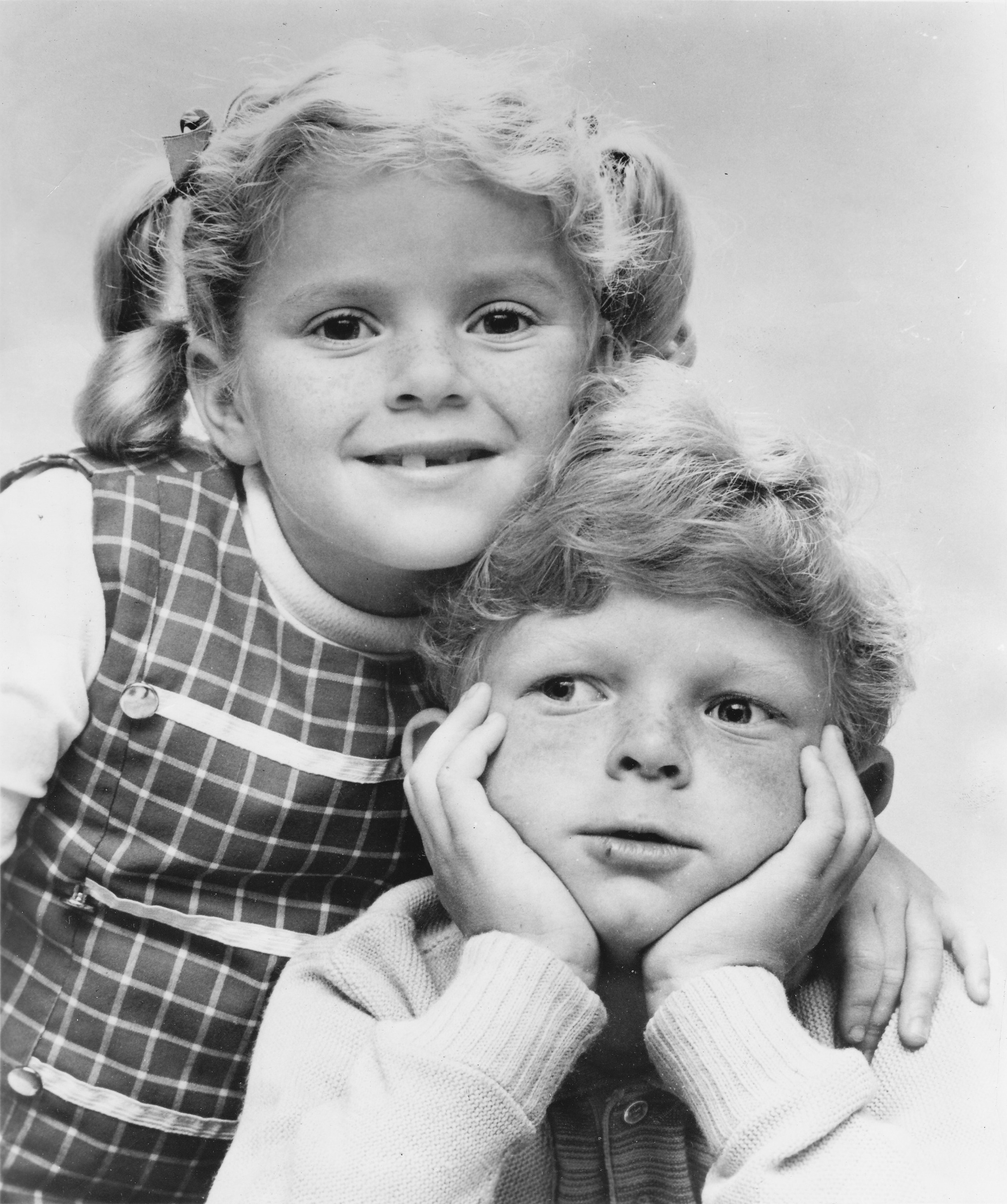
- Anissa Jones as Buffy and Johnny Whitaker as Jody, circa 1967, starred in the television series Family Affair.
- Gender: Female
- Language: English

Origin
- Meaning: Pet form of Elizabeth

Buffy or Buffie is a pet form of the female given name Elizabeth that is also in use as an independent name. It originated from a small child's lisping attempts to pronounce Elizabeth or the diminutive Bethie.

== Usage ==
The name ranked among the top 1,000 names for newborn American girls between 1967 and 1977. The popularity of the name coincided with the 1966 to 1971 air dates of the American television series Family Affair, in which child actress Anissa Jones played a character named Ava Elizabeth “Buffy” Patterson-Davis.

The name later became associated with the character Buffy Summers on the 1990s American television series Buffy the Vampire Slayer. The name was considered representative of the Valley girl stereotype, comical and lacking seriousness, which was one of the reasons the “girly, diminutive” name was chosen as the name for the title character of the series. During the 1980s, Buffy was also a stereotypical name for someone who is wealthy and snobbish.

The name is still in occasional use for girls in the 2020s.

== People ==
=== Given name ===
- Buffy Lawson, American country western singer
- Buffy Tyler (born 1978), American Playboy playmate
- Buffy Wicks (born 1977), American politician
- Buffy-Lynne Williams (born 1977), Canadian Olympic rower

=== Nickname ===
- Elizabeth Bowes-Lyon (1900–2002), the queen consort of Great Britain, who had the nickname Buffy as a child
- Buffie McFadyen, American politician.
- Buffy Sainte-Marie (born 1941), American musician, artist, and activist
- Dorothy Buffum Chandler (1901–1997), a Los Angeles cultural leader, was nicknamed Buffy or Buffie or Buff
- Buffy Williams (born 1976), Welsh politician and Member of the Senedd

=== Stage name ===
- Buffy (rapper) (born Kim Ju-hyeon, 1995) member of South Korean band MADTOWN
- Buffy Chen (born Chen Yan-fei in 2000), Taiwanese actress
- Buffy Dee (real name Anthony DeSantolo; 1923-1995), American actor, musician and bar owner

== Fictional characters ==
- Buffy Summers, the title character in the Buffy the Vampire Slayer media franchise
- Buffy Driscoll, a main character and Andi's best friend on Disney Channel's Andi Mack
- Buffy Gilmore, a main character in Scary Movie
- Buffy, the sister-in-law of Mike Motley in the 1976–2000 comic strip Motley's Crew
- Buffy Patterson Davis, the twin sister to Jody on the 1966 TV series Family Affair
- Buffy and Muffy Vanderschmere, animated fox characters in the Disney series TaleSpin
