= Vampire Killer (disambiguation) =

Vampire Killer is a 1986 Castlevania game for the MSX2.

Vampire Killer may also refer to:

- Castlevania: Bloodlines, a 1994 video game for the Sega Genesis, known as Vampire Killer in Japan
- "Vampire Killer" (song), a recurring theme song in the Castlevania series
- Vampire Killer (whip), a fictional weapon in the Castlevania series
- Vampire Killer, a nickname for the American serial killer Richard Chase

== See also ==
- Vampire hunter
- The Fearless Vampire Killers, a 1967 film
- Buffy the Vampire Slayer (disambiguation)
