= Buffy the Vampire Slayer (disambiguation) =

Buffy the Vampire Slayer is a 1997–2003 supernatural television drama series.

Buffy the Vampire Slayer may also refer to:

- Buffy the Vampire Slayer (film), a 1992 film that introduced the character Buffy Summers
- Buffy Summers, the protagonist of the Buffy the Vampire Slayer film, TV series, comics, and video games

== Publications ==
- Buffy the Vampire Slayer (BFI TV Classics), a 2005 academic publication relating to the TV series
- Buffy the Vampire Slayer Magazine incorporating Angel Magazine, a magazine title published by Titan Magazines
- Buffy the Vampire Slayer (Boom! Studios), comic book series reboot of the original television series (beginning in 2019)

== Music ==
- Buffy the Vampire Slayer: The Album, the 1999 TV series soundtrack
- Buffy the Vampire Slayer: The Score, a 2008 soundtrack album

== Games ==
- Buffy the Vampire Slayer (2000 video game), a Game Boy Color video game
- Buffy the Vampire Slayer (2002 video game), an Xbox video game
- Buffy the Vampire Slayer Collectible Card Game, a 2001 trading card game
- Buffy the Vampire Slayer Roleplaying Game, a 2002 role-playing game

== See also ==
- Buffy (disambiguation)
- Vampire Killer (disambiguation)
- Buffy the Vampire Slayer in popular culture
- Buffyverse
