= Clarice Navarro =

American politician

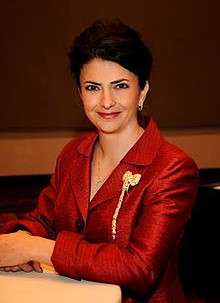

Member of the Colorado House of Representatives from the 47th district
- In office January 9, 2013 – November 12, 2017
- Preceded by: Keith Swerdfeger
- Succeeded by: Judy Reyher

Personal details
- Party: Republican
- Education: Otero Junior College
- Website: clarice47.com

Clarice Navarro (born c. 1976) is a politician and former state representative from Pueblo, Colorado. First elected in November 2012, Navarro served in the state house from January 2013 until she resigned in November 2017 to take a job in the Trump administration. Until January 2025, she worked in the office of Congresswoman Lauren Boebert.

== Education ==
Navarro attended Otero College. Navarro earned a Bachelor of Arts degree in business management from National American University.

== Career ==
Navarro was an educator at Colorado Department of Corrections and Las Animas High School. In 2003, Navarro was a business teacher until 2007.

== Elections ==
- 2012 When Republican Representative Keith Swerdfeger left the Legislature and left the District 47 seat open, Navarro was unopposed for the June 26, 2012 Republican Primary, winning with 4,067 votes, and won the November 6, 2012 General election with 18,215 votes (51.7%) against Democratic nominee Netto Rodosevich.
- In 2014, Representative Navarro won the general election with 18,358 votes (64.6%).
- In 2016, Representative Navarro won the general election with 21,714 votes (57.7%).

== Personal life ==
Navarro is divorced and she has two children. Navarro and her family are from Las Animas, Colorado.

== Ethics complaint ==
On September 17, 2026, a complaint was filed by David B. Wheeler of American Muckrakers, with the United States House Committee on Ethics which alleged that Lauren Boebert had sexual, and romantic, relationships with three senior staff members, particularly Navarro, district chief of staff Raven Finegan, and chief of staff Jeffrey Small, and that she paid them hush money, violating the House of Representatives code of conduct. The complaint alleges that Boebert paid Navarro $200,000 in order for her to not bring her own ethics complaint against Boebert. Navarro denied the allegations involving her as "false, defamatory, and beyond ridiculous."
