= Central Colorado =

Region of the U.S. state of Colorado

Coordinates: 39°12′N 105°42′W

Central Colorado is a region of the U.S. state of Colorado. Central Colorado is home to most of the population of the state and its geography is dominated by the Rocky Mountains, their foothills, mesas, and canyons, the rivers that run through them, and the open plains off the foothills. Central Colorado can be separated into two regions known as the north central region and the south central region. Central Colorado is home to the state's two largest cities, Denver and Colorado Springs. Central Colorado, has developed many campgrounds.

== Counties ==
=== North Central counties ===
- Adams County
- Arapahoe County
- Clear Creek County
- Denver County
- Gilpin County
- Jefferson County
- Summit County

=== South Central counties ===
- Douglas County
- El Paso
- Park County
- Teller County

== Larger cities ==
=== North Central cities ===
- Aurora
- Black Hawk
- Broomfield
- Central City
- Denver
- Georgetown
- Lakewood
- Littleton
- Louisville
- Fort Collins

=== South Central cities ===
- Castle Rock
- Colorado Springs
- Parker
- Woodland Park
