= Judy Reyher =

Former Colorado State legislator

Judy Reyher is a former state legislator in Colorado. A Republican, she was appointed to represent District 47 in the Colorado House of Representatives in 2017, representing Fremont County, Otero County, and Pueblo County, in 2017. She ran for a full term, but lost in the Republican primary in 2018.

She received criticism after her appointment for "offensive and racist" social media posts.
