= Buffie McFadyen =

American politician

County Commission of Pueblo County, Colorado
- In office 2013–2017

Member of the Colorado House of Representatives from the 47th district
- In office January 8, 2003 – January 12, 2011
- Preceded by: Kenneth Kester
- Succeeded by: Keith Swerdfeger

Personal details
- Born: Buffalo, New York
- Party: Democratic Party
- Education: Adams State College (M.A.)

Liane "Buffie" McFadyen is an American politician who served as a state legislator in the state of Colorado.

Originally from Buffalo, New York, she moved to Alamosa, Colorado, to attend Adams State University.

She served the limit of four terms as a representative in the Colorado House of Representatives, where she was the Speaker pro tem.

A member of the Democratic Party, McFadyen is a former member of the County commission of Pueblo County, Colorado, serving from 2013 to 2017. She filed to run for the 3rd District seat in Congress in 2014 but stepped aside that March in favor of former state Senator Abel Tapia.
