= Global Strategy Group =

American public relations and research firm

- Type: Private
- Industry: Political consulting, public relations, research
- Founded: 1995
- Headquarters: New York City
- Website: globalstrategygroup.com

Global Strategy Group, often known simply as GSG, is an American public relations and research firm founded in New York City in 1995. It is one of the largest Democratic polling firms in the country.

GSG has advised Governors of New York Eliot Spitzer, Andrew Cuomo, and Kathy Hochul, along with other notable New York politicians. Outside of New York, the firm has advised and done polling for numerous Democratic candidates running for state and federal office, most notably Kamala Harris in her 2024 presidential campaign. GSG also provides consultancy and research services to private sector and nonprofit organizations, including Fortune 100 companies, foundations, and national issue advocacy organizations.

== History and organization ==
In 1995, GSG was founded by Jonathan Silvan (CEO), Jefrey Pollock (President), and Jeffrey Plaut (Partner) as a boutique polling firm. From its inception, GSG has conducted public opinion research on behalf of its clients. Its clients have included political, corporate, and nonprofit organizations. Over time, it has also developed public relations, public affairs, and creative services. In 2008, the firm's annual revenues were about $20 million, and it had 50 employees. In addition to its main offices in New York and Washington, D.C., GSG reports offices in Chicago, Denver, Seattle, Philadelphia, Los Angeles, Nashville; and Hartford, Connecticut.

In 2019, GSG recorded $33.4 million in revenue. That figure increased to $50.5 million the following year. In 2022, the Milan-based communications firm SEC Newgate acquired a significant stake in GSG. Following this acquisition, GSG continued to function independently, while using SEC Newgate's resources to expand its operations outside the United States. As of April 2022, GSG had approximately 150 employees.

== Political campaigns ==
=== New York State ===
GSG has advised New York politicians, including former Governors Andrew Cuomo and Eliot Spitzer. The firm also advises current New York Governor Kathy Hochul. The relationship between GSG and Hochul dates back to the New York 26th congressional district special election, when GSG did polling work for her campaign.

During Andrew Cuomo's gubernatorial tenure, GSG President Jefrey Pollock was described as a member of Cuomo's "inner circle". According to the New York Times, Pollock was one of the key figures who advised Cuomo in the wake of the 2021 sexual harassment scandal that ultimately culminated in his resignation. A New York State attorney general report found that Pollock advised Cuomo to "express contrition" shortly after allegations against the governor became public.

GSG has advised Senator Kirsten Gillibrand. It has also done polling for New York House Representatives, including Joe Morelle, Ritchie Torres, Jerry Nadler, and Pat Ryan.

GSG advised Bill de Blasio during his 2009 Public Advocate campaign. In 2021, GSG ran polling for 2021 mayoral candidate Scott Stringer.

GSG served as Representative Joe Crowley's pollster in the 2018 Democratic primary for New York's 14th Congressional District. Though a GSG poll commissioned by Crowley's campaign found him up 35% versus activist Alexandria Ocasio-Cortez, Crowley ultimately lost to Ocasio-Cortez by 15%.

=== National work ===
Global Strategy Group is one of the largest Democratic polling firms in America. Its past clients have included Al Gore during his 2000 presidential run, John Edwards in 2008, former Governor of Iowa Chet Culver, and former Governor of Montana Brian Schweitzer. The firm has also done polling for Democratic candidates including Governors JB Pritzker, Janet Mills, and Josh Shapiro; Senators Ed Markey and Jacky Rosen; and Representatives Gabe Vasquez, Sharice Davids, and Steven Horsford. In 2024, GSG conducted polling for Vice President Kamala Harris's presidential campaign.

The firm regularly works with Democratic organizations such as the Democratic Governors Association, Priorities USA, and the Democratic Congressional Campaign Committee. In 2018, GSG's Jefrey Pollock and Nick Gourevitch, with other Democratic strategists, founded a polling project called Navigator Research. The project aims to provide research that helps Democratic candidates, committees, and pundits develop messaging that the voting public is likely to find persuasive.

In 2016, GSG worked for Coloradans for Coloradans, an advocacy group that campaigned against an initiative to establish a single-payer healthcare system in Colorado.

In 2020, GSG worked for Michael Bloomberg's presidential campaign, and conducted polling that found that Bernie Sanders would damage the prospects of Democratic candidates if he was the party's presidential nominee. GSG was hired by the Democratic Senatorial Campaign Committee (DSCC) to conduct polling on the 2020 Senate race in Georgia. GSG's research found that David Purdue, who went on to be defeated by Democratic Jon Ossoff, was seen unfavorably by a plurality of voters.

In early 2021, GSG and four other large Democratic polling firms led an internal review of the factors that caused them to make certain inaccurate predictions ahead of the 2020 election. The group released recommendations intended to improve polling accuracy in future elections.

In 2022, GSG worked with the Center for American Progress Action Fund on a research project gauging voter attitudes toward the term "MAGA Republican". This research, which found that most voters view the term negatively, was used by the Biden White House in composing a speech that was critical of Donald Trump and the "ultra MAGA agenda."

Since 2013, GSG has delivered an annual "Business & Politics" study, which reports on issues at the intersection of the public and private sectors.

== Corporate campaigns ==
=== Tech industry ===
GSG has advised companies in the technology industry, including Microsoft, Google, and Facebook, and in the telecommunications sector, most notably Comcast. GSG was reportedly hired by rideshare companies Uber and Lyft to conduct research in support of their position that drivers should be classified as independent contractors, not employees.

==== Amazon ====
In March 2022, it was reported that GSG was hired by Amazon to help thwart a 2022 unionization drive at its JFK8 warehouse in Staten Island. Representatives from GSG reportedly sat-in on meetings where workers were shown anti-union presentations, a charge that GSG denied. According to CNBC, GSG monitored the social media accounts of union organizers, and distributed printed materials and videos "to discourage employees from voting to join a union."

After facing criticism for their involvement, GSG asserted that some aspects of this reporting were untrue, but publicly apologized, telling The New Yorker that "we deeply regret being involved in any way." GSG later issued a statement claiming that it had begun adding language to its contracts stipulating that it would not work with any companies that made efforts to obstruct workplace organization efforts.

GSG reportedly failed to file a LM20 disclosure form with the Department of Labor, required by the Labor Management Reporting and Disclosure Act (LMDRA), regarding these activities. Clients of GSG including the Iowa Democratic Party and the American Federation of Teachers have since cut their ties with the organization. On April 14, 2022, a spokesperson for the Service Employees International Union (SEIU) confirmed that the union would not employ GSG's services in the future.

=== Pharmaceutical industry ===
Additionally, GSG has advised companies operating in the pharmaceutical sector, such as Purdue Pharma. GSG has also worked on behalf of GlaxoSmithKline and Pfizer.

== Advocacy campaigns ==
In 2020, the firm collaborated with Reproductive Freedom for All to survey mainstream media coverage of abortion. Their report discovered that despite 78 percent of the American public favoring abortion "at least in some circumstances," only nine percent of press coverage mentioned this broad consensus. GSG has also done polling that measures public opinion of Planned Parenthood. In 2022, the firm successfully worked against a referendum that would have taken away a woman's guaranteed right to abortion in Kansas. In 2023, it worked on the successful Issue 1 campaign in Ohio, which codified abortion rights in the state's constitution.

In 2020, GSG worked with Everytown for Gun Safety to provide polling data that showed that most Pennsylvania voters were in favor of stronger gun safety laws. GSG worked with Everytown again in 2022 on polling that found significant public support for an Illinois bill banning the sale of assault weapons and raising the state's gun-buying age to 21.

As part of a 2017 effort by the New York City's Independent Commission on Criminal Justice and Incarceration Reform to close Rikers Island, GSG and the Center for Justice Innovation released polling suggesting that most New York residents supported criminal justice reforms that would reduce the city's prison population. In 2021, GSG and the Equal Justice Initiative released a study comparing media coverage of white and Black defendants in criminal cases. The study found that white defendants were often portrayed in a more sympathetic light.

In 2020, GSG collaborated with Color of Change and UnidosUS to investigate the distribution of Paycheck Protection Program funds. Their report found that relatively few Black and Latino small business owners received federal loans compared to their white counterparts.

In 2019, GSG and the American Lung Association began publishing an annual poll that measures how Americans feel about clean air and climate action issues, such as investment in renewable fuels and emissions-free vehicles. GSG worked with the Environmental Defense Fund and Natural Resources Defense Council in 2022 on polling that indicates a majority of the public is concerned about air pollution and would support laws to reduce it.

GSG has also reported on how parents and teachers view education-related issues, such as post-COVID learning loss and the utility of K-12 math education. The firm has done polling gauging voter opinion on U.S. immigration policy and ballot access.

== 2010 state pension inquiry ==
In 2010, GSG was the subject of legal scrutiny as a result of the state investigation into Comptroller Alan Hevesi, who resigned in 2006 in a scandal. According to the New York Times, GSG allegedly "helped arrange deals between the city and state pension funds and InterMedia Partners, a prominent media investment fund, beginning in 2005" during Hevesi's tenure. In the face of an investigation by the New York Attorney General's office, GSG "paid $2 million for allegedly helping to steer money to private equity clients." According to Politico:

"The New York investigation has focused on political fixers like Morris and the Global Strategy Group, which allegedly sold entrée for fund managers to the more than $125 billion under the control of the New York State Comptroller."

GSG maintained that it had not violated any state laws, and stated in a press release that "There is no finding that we violated any law, and we are pleased to resolve this matter."
