= Melanson =

Melanson is a surname. Notable people with the surname include:

== People ==
- Chester Melanson (born 1940), Canadian politician and member in the Nova Scotia House of Assembly
- Dean Melanson (born 1973), former National Hockey League defenceman
- Louis-Joseph-Arthur Melanson (1879–1941), Canadian priest and Archbishop
- Melanie Melanson (born 1974), a missing teenager from Woburn, Middlesex County, Massachusetts since 1989
- Neil Melanson, American combat sports coach
- Olivier-Maximin Melanson (1854–1926), Acadian businessman
- Philip H. Melanson (1944–2006), American educator
- Roger Melanson, Canadian politician, member in the Legislative Assembly of New Brunswick
- Roland Melanson (born 1960), former National Hockey League goaltender and current goaltender coach
- Simeon Melanson (1873–1964), Canadian politician and member of the Legislative Assembly of New Brunswick

== Places ==
- Melanson, Nova Scotia, a community in the Canadian province of Nova Scotia, located in Kings County
- Val-Melanson, New Brunswick, an unincorporated community in Restigouche County, New Brunswick, Canada

== See also ==
- Melançon
