= Colorado's 6th congressional district =

U.S. House district for Colorado

Coordinates: 39°45′18″N 104°45′55″W

- Interactive map of district boundaries since January 3, 2023
- Representative: Jason Crow; D–Aurora
- Distribution: 98.51% urban; 1.49% rural
- Population (2025): 749,656
- Median household income: $104,950
- Ethnicity: 55.8% White; 22.1% Hispanic; 10.0% Black; 6.0% Asian; 4.9% Two or more races; 1.2% other
- Cook PVI: D+11

Colorado's 6th congressional district is a congressional district in the U.S. state of Colorado. Located in central Colorado, the district encompasses much of the eastern part of the Denver metropolitan area, including all of Aurora, as well as portions of the southern Denver metro area (Centennial and Littleton).

The district is currently represented by Democrat Jason Crow.

The district was created in 1983 as a result of the redistricting cycle after the 1980 census, and was originally a classic suburban Republican bastion; this was once the safest seat for Colorado Republicans outside of Colorado Springs. However, changing demographics in the Front Range, especially in Arapahoe County which went from a traditional conservative suburban/exurban stronghold to a densely populated, ethnically and culturally diverse Democratic-leaning inner suburban county, has made these suburban areas much friendlier to Democrats. The 2010 redistricting shifted the more rural, GOP-dominated sections of the district to the nearby 4th and added heavily populated and Democratic parts of Aurora, turning the 6th district into a Democratic-leaning swing district. However, Republicans are still competitive downballot, and the Democratic strength was limited to western Arapahoe County for much of its history, as the components of Douglas County and Adams County in the 6th were still Republican leaning: this changed in 2020, as Joe Biden and Representative Jason Crow won all county areas in the district.

After 2020 redistricting, the 6th became a purely inner suburban district anchored in western Arapahoe County, although small parts of Jefferson, Douglas, and Adams Counties were included as well to completely take in the cities of Littleton and Aurora. A small portion of the City and County of Denver near Four Square Mile was Ialso drawn into the district. With a PVI of D+11, it is now safely Democratic; among Colorado districts, only the Denver-based 1st and Boulder-based 2nd are more Democratic.

== History ==
=== 1990s ===
Following the 1990 U.S. census and associated realignment of Colorado congressional districts, the 6th congressional district consisted of portions of Arapahoe and Jefferson counties.

=== 2000s ===
Following the 2000 U.S. census and associated realignment of Colorado congressional districts, the 6th congressional district consisted of Douglas and Elbert counties as well as portions of Arapahoe, Jefferson, and Park counties.

=== 2010s ===
During the 2010 Colorado Redistricting, the 6th congressional district lost most of its previous area; the district now consisted of the western portions of Arapahoe and Adams counties plus the community of Highlands Ranch in Douglas County and a very little part of Jefferson County.

=== 2020s ===
During the 2020 Colorado Redistricting, the 6th congressional district became a pure inner-suburban district consisting of western Arapahoe County, the portions of the City of Aurora located in Adams and Douglas counties, as well as parts of Jefferson County bordering Littleton near Highway 470.

== Characteristics ==
Suburban in character, this ethnically and economically diverse district takes in Denver's southern and eastern suburbs and is now fairly Democratic, despite historically being a Republican district.

Aurora, a diverse city with 21% foreign-born residents makes up the base of the population: while the city generally votes to the left and is a suburban stronghold for Colorado Democrats, it also provided enough support for Republican Mike Coffman to hold the district for a decade.

The suburbs to Denver's south side in the district are a mixed bag - Greenwood Village and Cherry Hills Village have a large amount of registered Republicans, however the Republicans here are mainly economically conservative and much more moderate socially compared to the rest of the state. Centennial and Littleton have historically tended to vote Republican but have voted Democratic since 2016: Englewood and Sheridan, being closer socially and economically to nearby Denver are safe for the Democrats, however they do not make up a large part of the district's population.

== Composition ==
For the 118th and successive Congresses (based on redistricting following the 2020 census), the district contains all or portions of the following counties and communities:

Adams County (1)

Aurora (shared with Arapahoe and Douglas counties)

Arapahoe County (17)

Aetna Estates, Aurora (shared with Adams and Douglas counties), Bennett (part; also 8th; shared with Adams County), Bow Mar (shared with Jefferson County), Centennial, Cherry Creek, Cherry Hills Village, Columbine (shared with Jefferson County), Columbine Valley, Dove Valley, Englewood, Four Square Mile, Foxfield, Greenwood Village, Inverness, Littleton (shared with Douglas and Jefferson counties), Sheridan

Denver County (1)

Denver (part; also 1st)

Douglas County (2)

Aurora (shared with Adams and Arapahoe counties), Littleton (shared with Douglas and Jefferson counties)

Jefferson County (5)

Aurora (shared with Adams and Arapahoe counties), Bow Mar (shared with Arapahoe County), Columbine (shared with Arapahoe County), Ken Caryl, Littleton (shared with Arapahoe and Jefferson counties)

== Recent election results from statewide races ==
Year	Office	Results
2008	President	Obama 55% - 43%
2008	Senate	Udall 54% - 42%
2010	Senate	Bennet 49% - 46%
2010	Governor	Hickenlooper 52% - 8%
2010	Secretary of State	Gessler 50% - 44%
2010	Treasurer	Kennedy 50.1% - 49.9%
2010	Attorney General	Suthers 57% - 43%
2012	President	Obama 55% - 45%
2014	Senate	Udall 48% - 47%
2016	President	Clinton 52% - 39%
2016	Senate	Bennet 54% - 41%
2018	Governor	Polis 57% - 40%
2018	Attorney General	Weiser 54% - 43%
2020	President	Biden 61% - 37%
2020	Senate	Hickenlooper 58% - 40%
2022	Senate	Bennet 60% - 38%
2022	Governor	Polis 63% - 35%
2022	Secretary of State	Griswold 59% - 39%
2022	Treasurer	Young 58% - 39%
2022	Attorney General	Weiser 58% - 39%
2024	President	Harris 58% - 39%

== List of members representing the district ==
Representative (Residency)	Party	Years	Cong ress(es)	Electoral history	District location
District created January 3, 1983
Vacant		January 3, 1983 – March 29, 1983	98th	Representative-elect Jack Swigert died December 27, 1982.	1983–1993; Parts of Adams, Arapahoe, Denver, and Jefferson
Daniel Schaefer (Lakewood)	Republican	March 29, 1983 – January 3, 1999	98th 99th 100th 101st 102nd 103rd 104th 105th	Elected to finish Swigert's term. Re-elected in 1984. Re-elected in 1986. Re-elected in 1988. Re-elected in 1990. Re-elected in 1992. Re-elected in 1994. Re-elected in 1996. Retired.	1983–1993; Parts of Adams, Arapahoe, Denver, and Jefferson
Daniel Schaefer (Lakewood)	Republican	March 29, 1983 – January 3, 1999	98th 99th 100th 101st 102nd 103rd 104th 105th	Elected to finish Swigert's term. Re-elected in 1984. Re-elected in 1986. Re-elected in 1988. Re-elected in 1990. Re-elected in 1992. Re-elected in 1994. Re-elected in 1996. Retired.	1993–2003; Parts of Arapahoe and Jefferson
Tom Tancredo (Littleton)	Republican	January 3, 1999 – January 3, 2009	106th 107th 108th 109th 110th	Elected in 1998. Re-elected in 2000. Re-elected in 2002. Re-elected in 2004. Re-elected in 2006. Retired.	1993–2003; Parts of Arapahoe and Jefferson
Tom Tancredo (Littleton)	Republican	January 3, 1999 – January 3, 2009	106th 107th 108th 109th 110th	Elected in 1998. Re-elected in 2000. Re-elected in 2002. Re-elected in 2004. Re-elected in 2006. Retired.	2003–2013 Douglas and Elbert; parts of Arapahoe, Jefferson, and Park
Mike Coffman (Aurora)	Republican	January 3, 2009 – January 3, 2019	111th 112th 113th 114th 115th	Elected in 2008. Re-elected in 2010. Re-elected in 2012. Re-elected in 2014. Re-elected in 2016. Lost re-election.	2003–2013 Douglas and Elbert; parts of Arapahoe, Jefferson, and Park
Mike Coffman (Aurora)	Republican	January 3, 2009 – January 3, 2019	111th 112th 113th 114th 115th	Elected in 2008. Re-elected in 2010. Re-elected in 2012. Re-elected in 2014. Re-elected in 2016. Lost re-election.	2013–2023 Parts of Adams, Arapahoe, and Douglas
Jason Crow (Aurora)	Democratic	January 3, 2019 – present	116th 117th 118th 119th	Elected in 2018. Re-elected in 2020. Re-elected in 2022. Re-elected in 2024. Re-elected in 2026.	2013–2023 Parts of Adams, Arapahoe, and Douglas
Jason Crow (Aurora)	Democratic	January 3, 2019 – present	116th 117th 118th 119th	Elected in 2018. Re-elected in 2020. Re-elected in 2022. Re-elected in 2024. Re-elected in 2026.	2023–present Parts of Adams, Arapahoe, Douglas, and Jefferson

== Election results ==
=== 1982 ===
1982 United States House of Representatives elections
Party	Candidate	Votes	%
Republican	Jack Swigert	98,909	62.16%
Democratic	Steve Hogan	56,598	35.57%
Libertarian	J. Craig Green	3,605	2.27%
Total votes		159,112	100%
Republican win (new seat)			

=== 1983 (Special) ===
1983 Colorado's 6th congressional district special election
Party	Candidate	Votes	%
Republican	Daniel Schaefer	49,816	63.29%
Democratic	Steve Hogan	27,779	35.29%
Concerns of People Party	John Heckman	1,112	1.41%
Total votes		78,707	100%
Republican hold			

=== 1984 ===
1984 United States House of Representatives elections
Party	Candidate	Votes	%
Republican	Daniel Schaefer (incumbent)	171,427	89.40%
Concerns of People Party	John Heckman	20,333	10.60%
Total votes		191,760	100%
Republican hold			

=== 1986 ===
1986 United States House of Representatives elections
Party	Candidate	Votes	%
Republican	Daniel Schaefer (incumbent)	104,359	63.04%
Democratic	Chuck Norris	58,834	35.54%
Concerns of People Party	John Heckman	2,338	1.41%
Total votes		165,531	100%
Republican hold			

=== 1988 ===
1988 United States House of Representatives elections
Party	Candidate	Votes	%
Republican	Daniel Schaefer (incumbent)	136,487	63.03%
Democratic	Martha Ezzard	77,158	35.63%
Concerns of People Party	John Heckman	2,911	1.34%
Total votes		216,556	100%
Republican hold			

=== 1990 ===
1990 United States House of Representatives elections
Party	Candidate	Votes	%
Republican	Daniel Schaefer (incumbent)	105,312	64.50%
Democratic	Don Jarrett	57,961	35.50%
Total votes		163,273	100%
Republican hold			

=== 1992 ===
1992 United States House of Representatives elections
Party	Candidate	Votes	%
Republican	Daniel Schaefer (incumbent)	142,021	60.93%
Democratic	Tom Kolbe	91,073	39.07%
Prohibition	Earl Higgerson (write-in)	3	0.00%
Total votes		233,097	100%
Republican hold			

=== 1994 ===
1994 United States House of Representatives elections
Party	Candidate	Votes	%
Republican	Daniel Schaefer (incumbent)	124,079	69.82%
Democratic	John Hallen	49,701	27.97%
Concerns of People Party	John Heckman	2,536	1.43%
Natural Law	Stephen D. Dawson	1,393	0.78%
Total votes		177,709	100%
Republican hold			

=== 1996 ===
1996 United States House of Representatives elections
Party	Candidate	Votes	%
Republican	Daniel Schaefer (incumbent)	146,018	62.24%
Democratic	Joan Fitz-Gerald	88,600	37.76%
Total votes		234,618	100%
Republican hold			

=== 1998 ===
1998 United States House of Representatives elections
Party	Candidate	Votes	%
Republican	Tom Tancredo	111,374	55.91%
Democratic	Henry L. Strauss	82,622	41.48%
Natural Law	George E. Newman	5,152	2.59%
Total votes		199,188	100%
Republican hold			

=== 2000 ===
2000 United States House of Representatives elections in Colorado
Party	Candidate	Votes	%
Republican	Tom Tancredo (incumbent)	141,410	53.88%
Democratic	Kenneth A. Toltz	110,568	42.12%
Libertarian	Adam David Katz	6,882	2.62%
Concerns of People Party	John Heckman	3,614	1.38%
Total votes		262,477	100%
Republican hold			

=== 2002 ===
2002 United States House of Representatives elections in Colorado
Party	Candidate	Votes	%
Republican	Tom Tancredo (incumbent)	158,851	66.88%
Democratic	Lance Wright	71,327	30.03%
Libertarian	Adam David Katz	7,323	3.08%
Total votes		237,501	100%
Republican hold			

=== 2004 ===
2004 United States House of Representatives elections in Colorado
Party	Candidate	Votes	%
Republican	Tom Tancredo (incumbent)	212,778	59.48%
Democratic	Joanna Conti	139,870	39.10%
Libertarian	Jack J. Woehr	3,857	1.08%
Constitution	Peter Shevchuck	1,235	0.35%
Total votes		357,741	100%
Republican hold			

=== 2006 ===
2006 United States House of Representatives elections in Colorado
Party	Candidate	Votes	%
Republican	Tom Tancredo (incumbent)	158,806	58.61%
Democratic	Bill Winter	108,007	39.87%
Libertarian	Jack J. Woehr	4,093	1.51%
Republican	Juan B. Botero (write-in)	25	0.01%
Total votes		270,931	100%
Republican hold			

=== 2008 ===
==== Republican primary ====
2008 Republican primary in Colorado's 6th congressional district
Party	Candidate	Votes	%
Republican	Mike Coffman	28,509	40.12%
Republican	Wil Armstrong	23,213	32.67%
Republican	Ted Harvey	10,886	15.32%
Republican	Steve Ward	8,452	11.89%
Total votes		71,060	100%

==== General election ====
2008 United States House of Representatives elections in Colorado
Party	Candidate	Votes	%
Republican	Mike Coffman	250,877	60.67%
Democratic	Hank Eng	162,641	39.33%
Total votes		413,516	100%
Republican hold			

=== 2010 ===
2010 United States House of Representatives elections in Colorado
Party	Candidate	Votes	%
Republican	Mike Coffman (incumbent)	217,400	65.67%
Democratic	John Flerlage	104,159	31.46%
Libertarian	Rob McNealy	9,471	2.86%
Write-in	Michael Shawn Kearns	7	0.00%
Total votes		331,037	100%
Republican hold			

=== 2012 ===
2012 United States House of Representatives elections in Colorado
Party	Candidate	Votes	%
Republican	Mike Coffman (incumbent)	163,938	47.81%
Democratic	Joe Miklosi	156,937	45.77%
Libertarian	Patrick E. Provost	8,597	2.51%
UNA	Kathy Polhemus	13,442	3.92%
Total votes		342,914	100%
Republican hold			

=== 2014 ===
2014 United States House of Representatives elections in Colorado
Party	Candidate	Votes	%
Republican	Mike Coffman (incumbent)	143,467	51.90%
Democratic	Andrew Romanoff	118,847	42.99%
Libertarian	Norm Olsen	8,623	3.12%
Green	Gary Swing	5,503	1.99%
Total votes		276,440	100%
Republican hold			

=== 2016 ===
2016 United States House of Representatives elections in Colorado
Party	Candidate	Votes	%
Republican	Mike Coffman (incumbent)	191,626	50.91%
Democratic	Morgan Carroll	160,372	42.60%
Libertarian	Norm Olsen	18,778	4.99%
Green	Robert Lee Worthey	5,641	1.50%
Total votes		376,417	100%
Republican hold			

=== 2018 ===
2018 United States House of Representatives elections in Colorado
Party	Candidate	Votes	%
Democratic	Jason Crow	184,399	54.08%
Republican	Mike Coffman (incumbent)	146,339	42.92%
Libertarian	Kat Martin	5,733	1.68%
Independent	Dan Chapin	4,512	1.32%
Total votes		340,983	100%
Democratic gain from Republican			

=== 2020 ===
2020 United States House of Representatives elections in Colorado
Party	Candidate	Votes	%
Democratic	Jason Crow (incumbent)	250,314	57.09%
Republican	Steve House	175,192	39.96%
Libertarian	Norm Olsen	9,083	2.07%
Unity	Jaimie Kulikowski	3,884	0.89%
Total votes		438,473	100%
Democratic hold			

=== 2022 ===
2022 United States House of Representatives elections in Colorado
Party	Candidate	Votes	%
Democratic	Jason Crow (incumbent)	170,140	60.06%
Republican	Steve Monahan	105,084	37.04%
Libertarian	Eric Mulder	5,531	2.0%
Total votes		280,755	100%
Democratic hold			

=== 2024 ===
2024 United States House of Representatives elections in Colorado
Party	Candidate	Votes	%
Democratic	Jason Crow (incumbent)	202,686	58.97%
Republican	John Fabbricatore	132,174	38.45%
Libertarian	John Kittleson	4,832	1.41%
Approval Voting	Travis Nicks	4,004	1.16%
Write-in		25	0.00%
Total votes		343,721	100%
Democratic hold			

== Historical district boundaries ==
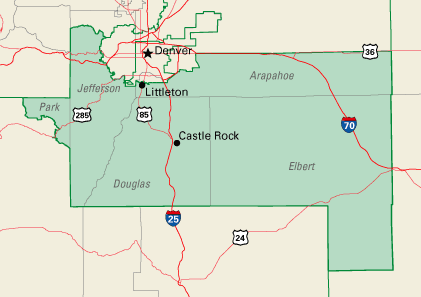
2003–2013

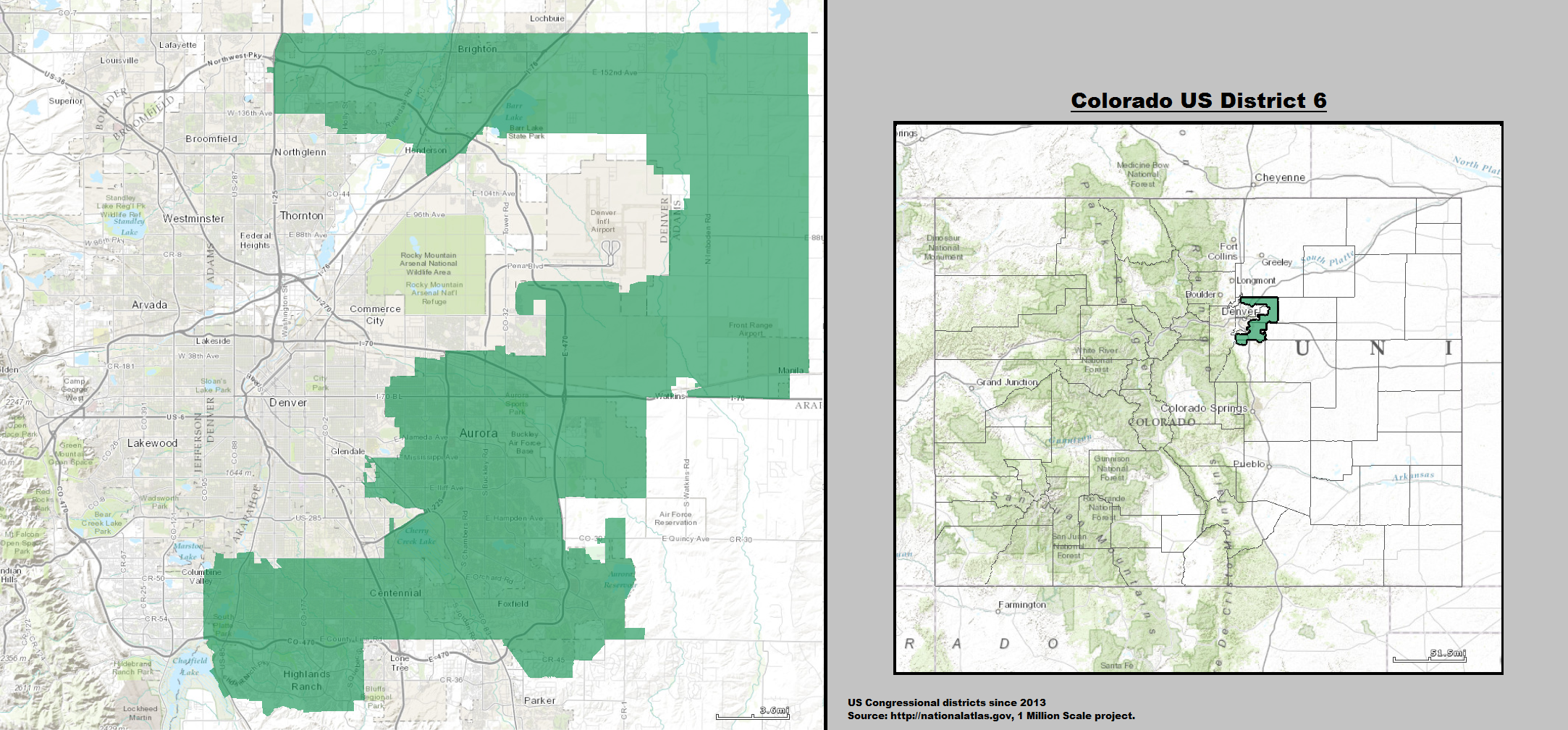
2013–2023

== See also ==
- Colorado's congressional districts
- List of United States congressional districts
