= Foxfield =

Foxfield could refer to:

Horse Racing:

- Foxfield Races, a biannual steeplechase race in Albemarle County

Places:

- Foxfield, Colorado, United States
- Foxfield, County Leitrim, Ireland
- Foxfield, Cumbria, England
- Foxfield, Carrickmacross, County Monaghan, Ireland

A railway station:

- Foxfield railway station

And an unconnected heritage railway:

- Foxfield Steam Railway, Staffordshire, England
