= Castlewood, Colorado =

Neighborhood in Centennial, Colorado, USA

Castlewood, Centennial, Colorado
- Centennial neighborhood
- Location of Castlewood in Arapahoe County, Colorado.

- Location of Castlewood, Centennial, Colorado Castlewood (Colorado)
- Coordinates: 39.5847°N 104.9011°W
- Country: United States
- State: Colorado
- County: Arapahoe

Government
  - Type: neighborhood
  - Body: City of Centennial
- Elevation: 5,729 ft (1,746 m)

Population (2000)
  - Total: 25,567
- Time zone: UTC−07:00 (MST)
  - Summer (DST): UTC−06:00 (MDT)
- ZIP code: 80112
- Area codes: 303/720/983
- GNIS pop ID: 1867078
- GNIS city ID: 2409422
- FIPS code: 08-12815

Castlewood was a former census-designated place (CDP) in Colorado made up of several neighborhoods covering about 3.5 square miles of unincorporated Arapahoe County just west of I-25. The CDP became part of part of the City of Centennial upon the city's incorporation in 2001. Castlewood's population was 25,567 at the 2000 census.

On Census Bureau maps, the CDP was bordered by Greenwood Village on the north and north-east, I-25 on the east, Douglas County to south, and the Southglenn CDP to the west on the other side of South Holly Street.

While the Census Bureau used the name "Castlewood" for the CDP, it was not used locally as the name for a specific town or neighborhood. It was, however, used for other purposes in the area. In 1890, Castlewood Dam and Lake was built east of Castle Rock about 18 miles southeast of the CDP location; it was destroyed in a major flood in 1933 and is now Castlewood Canyon State Park. The former Castlewood School was built in 1907 at Orchard and Ulster, and the former Castlewood Grange was chartered in 1907. The Castlewood Fire Protection District, which included the CDP, was founded on October 25, 1951; it changed its name to South Metro Fire Rescue on December 31, 1998, after joining with other districts. The local library, part of the Arapahoe Library District and located near the center of the CDP, is still called the Castlewood Library.

== Demographics ==
former Castlewood CDP
Year	Pop.	±%
1980	16,413	—
1990	24,392	+48.6%
2000	25,567	+4.8%
Source: United States Census Bureau

== Economy ==
The headquarters of Blackjack Pizza, by 1999, was in what was then Castlewood CDP.

== See also ==
- Denver–Aurora–Centennial, CO Metropolitan Statistical Area
- Front Range Urban Corridor
- List of populated places in Colorado
