= Yale station =

Light rail station in Denver, Colorado

Yale
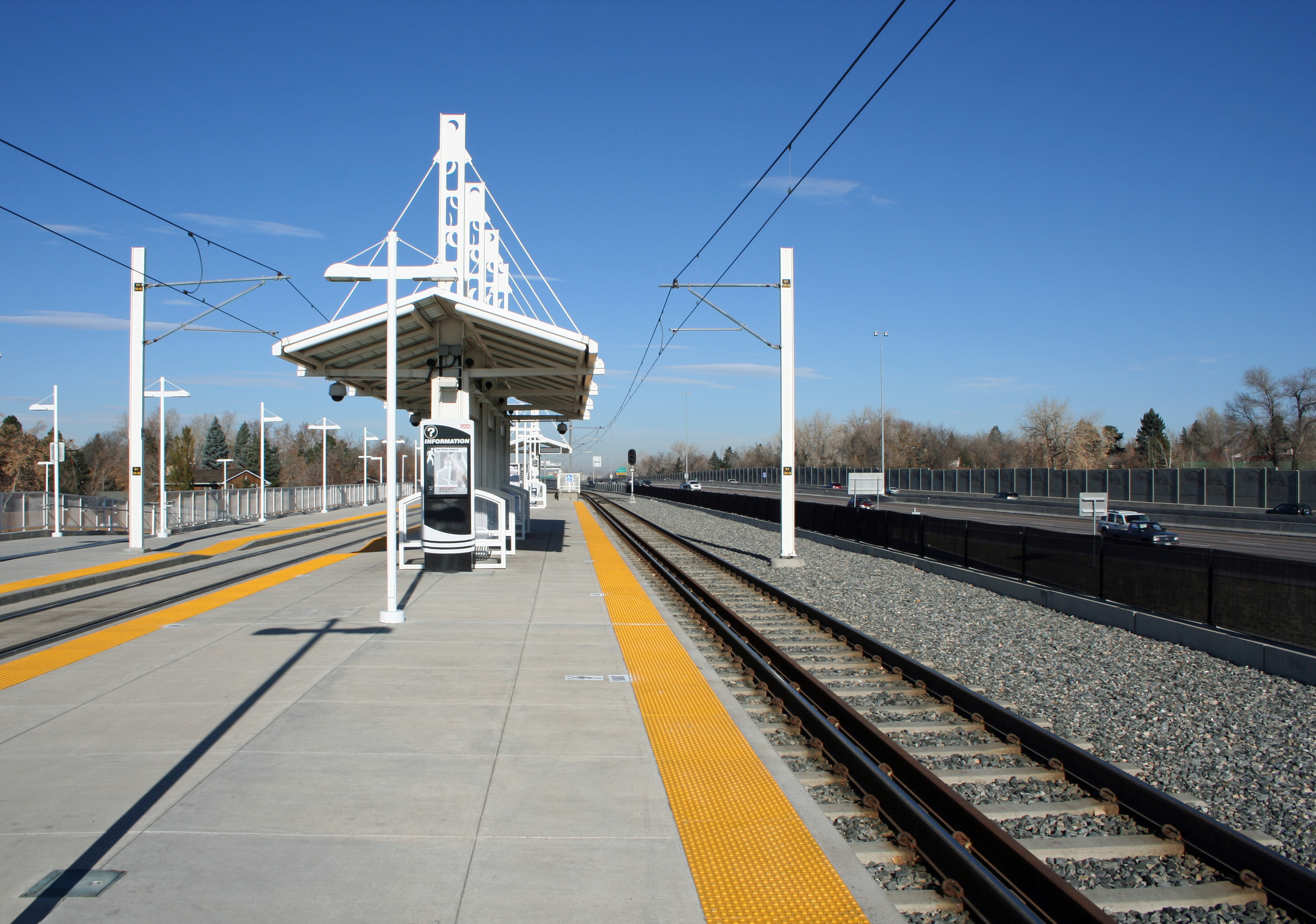
- Yale station platform with Interstate 25 to the right

General information
- Location: 5315 East Yale Avenue; Denver and Holly Hills, Colorado
- Coordinates: 39.6691°N 104.9272°W
- Owner: Regional Transportation District
- Line: Southeast Corridor
- Platforms: 1 island platform, 1 side platform
- Tracks: 2
- Connections: RTD Bus: 46

Construction
- Structure type: Elevated
- Parking: 129 spaces
- Cycle facilities: 8 racks, 10 lockers
- Accessible: Yes

History
- Opened: November 17, 2006

Passengers
- 2025: 528 (average daily)
- Rank: 57 out of 75

Services
Preceding station	RTD	Following station
Colorado toward Union Station	E Line	Southmoor toward RidgeGate Parkway
Colorado toward Alameda	T Line	Southmoor toward Lincoln
Former services
Preceding station	RTD	Following station
Colorado toward 18th & California	F Line	Southmoor toward RidgeGate Parkway
Future services
Preceding station	RTD	Following station
Colorado toward 18th & California/Stout	H Line Suspended	Southmoor toward Florida
Location

Yale station is a light rail station in Denver and Holly Hills, Colorado, United States. It is operated by the Regional Transportation District (RTD), and was opened on November 17, 2006. It is currently served by the E and T Lines.

Yale is typically served by the H Line, which is currently suspended due to the Downtown Rail Reconstruction Project. When complete, H Line service will be restored and the T Line will be eliminated.

== Station layout ==
2F

Platform Level

I-25
Northbound
← toward Union Station (Colorado)
← toward Alameda (Colorado)
Island platform, northbound only; doors will open on the left
Southbound
toward RidgeGate Parkway (Southmoor) →
toward Lincoln (Southmoor) →
Side platform, southbound only; doors will open on the right
1F
East Yale Avenue; bus bays; parking

The station features a series of public art murals entitled Connected, which was created by Gregory Gove and dedicated in 2007.
