= 1983 United States House of Representatives elections =

- February 12 – November 8, 1983

5 (out of 435) seats in the U.S. House of Representatives 218 seats needed for a majority
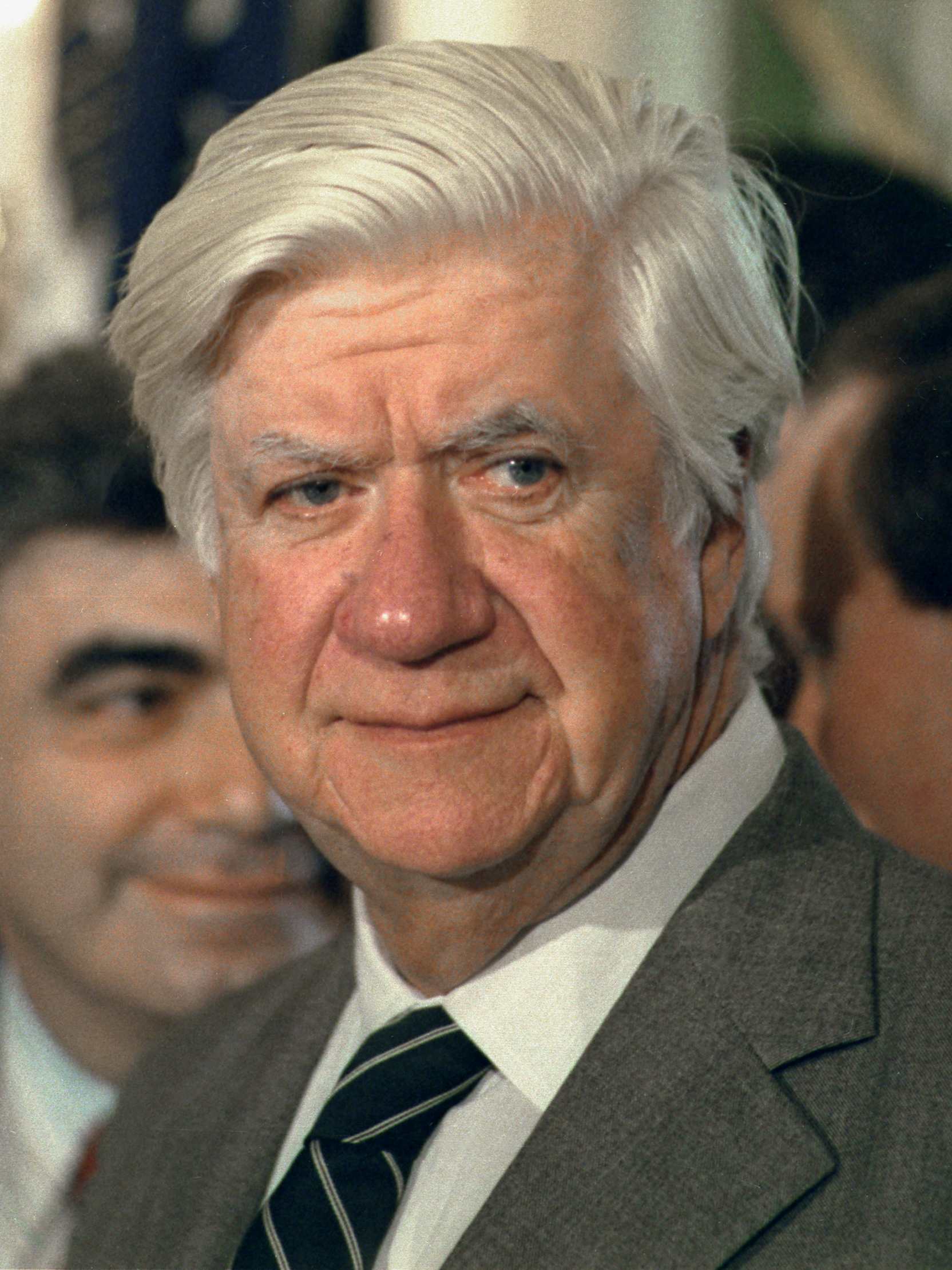

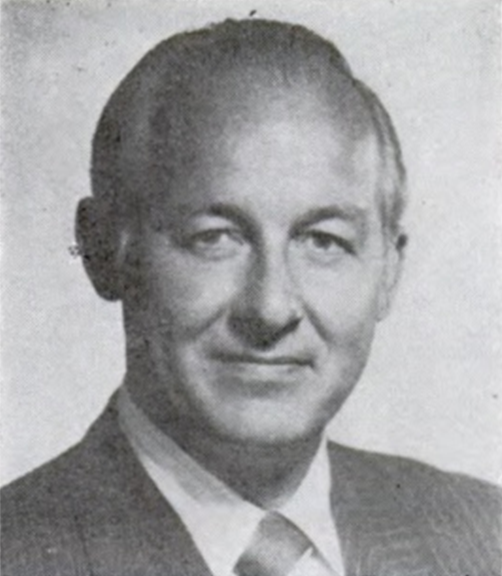
	Majority party	Minority party
Leader	Tip O'Neill	Bob Michel
Party	Democratic	Republican
Leader since	January 4, 1977	January 3, 1981
Leader's seat	Massachusetts 8th	Illinois 18th
Last election	269 seats	165 seats
Seat change	▼2	▲2
Seats up	267	167
Races won	4	2

There were five elections to the United States House of Representatives in 1983, during the 98th United States Congress.

== List of elections ==
Elections are listed by date and district.

District	Incumbent			This race	
District	Member	Party	First elected	Results	Candidates
Texas 6	Phil Gramm	Democratic	1978	Incumbent resigned January 5, 1983, then ran as a Republican. Incumbent re-elected February 12, 1983. Republican gain.	▌ ✓ Phil Gramm (Republican) 55.27%; ▌Dan Kubiak (Democratic) 39.57%; ▌John Henry Faulk (Democratic) 3.66%; Scattering 1.50%
New York 7	Benjamin S. Rosenthal	Democratic	1962 (special)	Incumbent died January 4, 1983. New member elected March 1, 1983. Democratic hold.	▌ ✓ Gary Ackerman (Democratic) 48.73%; ▌Albert Lemishow (Republican) 23.93%; ▌Douglas E. Schoen (Queens Independent) 15.89%; ▌Sheldon S. Leffler (Neighborhood Service) 11.44%
Colorado 6	None (new district)			Representative-elect Jack Swigert (R) died December 27, 1982, of bone cancer. New member elected March 29, 1983. Republican gain.	▌ ✓ Daniel Schaefer (Republican) 63.29%; ▌Steve Hogan (Democratic) 35.29%; ▌John Heckman (Concerns of People) 1.41%
California 5	Phillip Burton	Democratic	1964 (special)	Incumbent died April 10, 1983. New member elected June 21, 1983. Democratic hold.	▌ ✓ Sala Burton (Democratic) 56.94%; ▌Duncan L. Howard (Republican) 23.27%; ▌Richard Doyle (Democratic) 8.37%; ▌Tom Spinosa (Republican) 3.73%; Others: ▌Gary Richard Arnold (Republican) 2.03%; ▌Tibor Uskert (Democratic) 1.42%; ▌William Dunlap (Democratic) 1.33%; ▌Evelyn K. Lantz (Democratic) 1.12%; Scattering 1.8%
Illinois 1	Harold Washington	Democratic	1980	Incumbent resigned April 30, 1983, to become Mayor of Chicago. New member elected August 23, 1983. Democratic hold.	▌ ✓ Charles Hayes (Democratic) 93.69%; ▌Diane Preacely (Republican) 5.37%
Georgia 7	Larry McDonald	Democratic	1974	Incumbent died September 1, 1983, on Korean Air Lines Flight 007. New member elected November 8, 1983. Democratic hold.	Special primary (October 18, 1983): ▌ Kathryn McDonald (Democratic) 30.58%; ▌ George Darden (Democratic) 27.56%; ▌Dave Sellers (Republican) 25.44%; ▌George Pullen (Democratic) 5.50%; ▌Dan Fincher (Democratic) 5.14%; ▌Lon L. Day Jr. (Democratic) 3.51%; Special runoff (November 8, 1983): ▌ ✓ George Darden (Democratic) 59.09%; ▌Kathryn McDonald (Democratic) 40.91%
