= Jack Swigert =

American astronaut and politician (1931–1982)

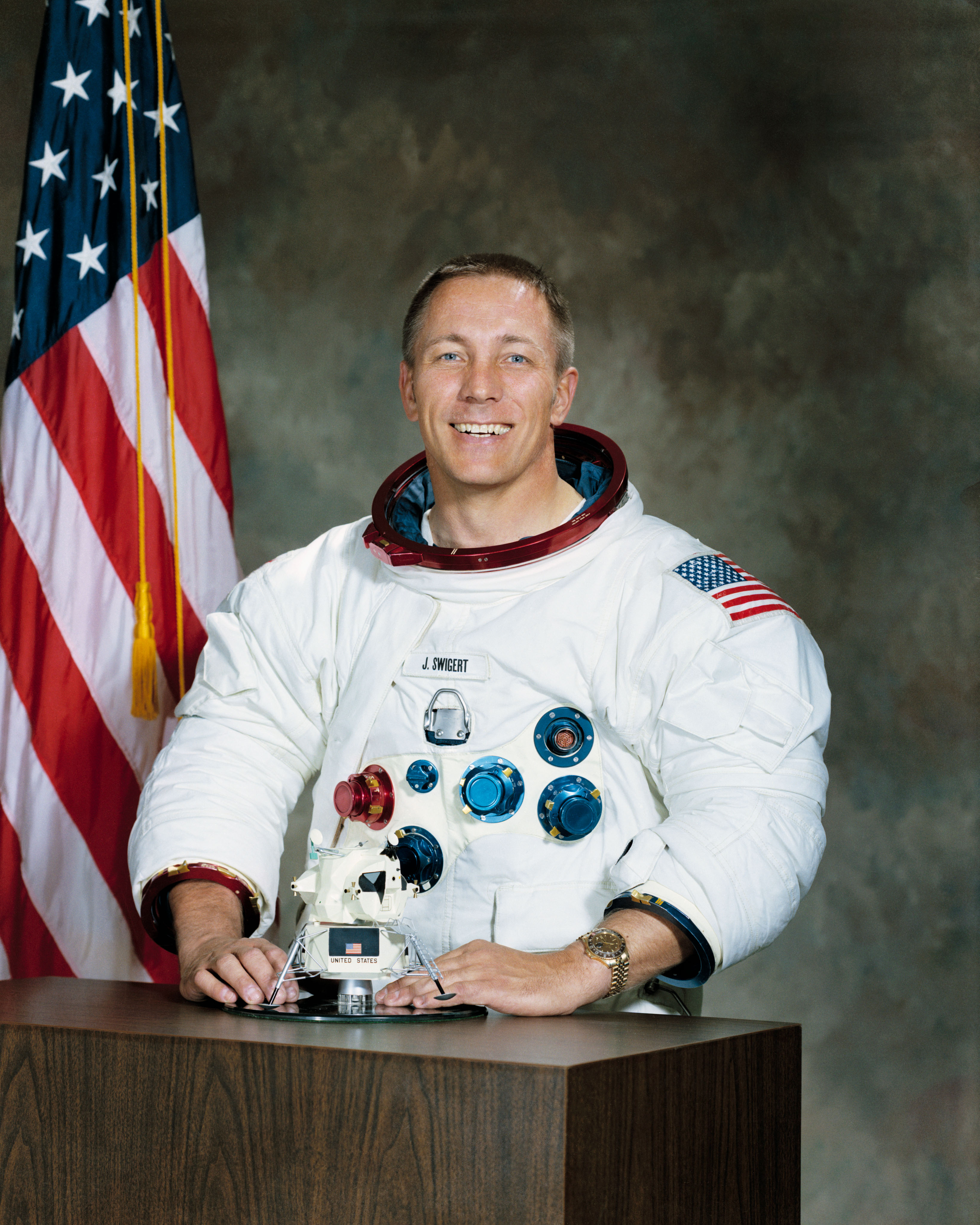
- Swigert in 1971

Member-elect of the U.S. House of Representatives from Colorado's 6th district
- Died before assuming office
- Preceded by: District established
- Succeeded by: Daniel Schaefer (as member)

Personal details
- Born: John Leonard Swigert Jr. August 30, 1931 Denver, Colorado, U.S.
- Died: December 27, 1982 (aged 51) Washington, D.C., U.S.
- Resting place: Mount Olivet Cemetery
- Party: Republican
- Education: University of Colorado, Boulder (BS); Rensselaer Polytechnic Institute (MS); University of Hartford (MBA)
- Awards: Presidential Medal of Freedom; NASA Distinguished Service Medal
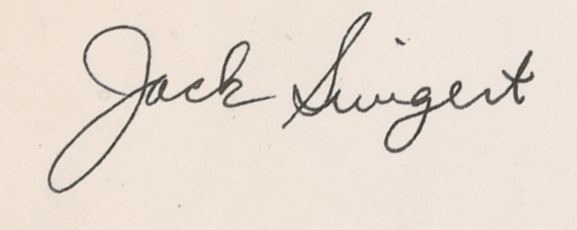
- Signature

Military service
- Allegiance: United States
- Branch: United States Air Force
- Service years: 1953–1956 (active); 1956–1965 (reserve)
- Rank: Captain
- Unit: Massachusetts Air National Guard (1957–1960); Connecticut Air National Guard (1960–1965)
- Space career

NASA astronaut
- Time in space: 5 days, 22 hours, 54 minutes
- Selection: NASA Group 5 (1966)
- Mission: Apollo 13
- Retired: August 1977

John Leonard Swigert Jr. (August 30, 1931 – December 27, 1982) was an American NASA astronaut, test pilot, mechanical engineer, aerospace engineer, United States Air Force pilot, and politician. In April 1970, as command module pilot of Apollo 13, he became one of 24 Apollo astronauts who reached the Moon. Due to the "slingshot" route around the Moon they chose to safely return to Earth, the Apollo 13 astronauts flew farther away from Earth than any other astronauts until the Artemis II lunar flyby in 2026, though they had to abort the Moon landing.

Before joining NASA in 1966, Swigert was a civilian test pilot and fighter pilot in the Air National Guard. After leaving NASA, he ran to represent Colorado in the U.S. Senate but lost in a primary election against Bill Armstrong. He subsequently was elected to represent Colorado's 6th congressional district in the U.S. House of Representatives in 1982, but died of cancer before being sworn into office.

== Early life ==
John Leonard Swigert Jr. was born on August 30, 1931, in Denver, Colorado, to parents Dr. John Leonard Swigert Sr. (1903–1974) and Virginia Anne Swigert (née Seep) (1908–1994), both of German Catholic descent. Swigert's father was an ophthalmologist. At the age of 14, he became fascinated by aviation. While he would have been content just watching planes take off from nearby Combs Field, young Jack became determined to do more than be a spectator. He took on a newspaper route to earn money for flying lessons, and by age 16 he was a licensed private pilot. He was a member of the Boy Scouts of America and attained the rank of Second Class Scout. He attended Blessed Sacrament School, Regis Jesuit High School and East High School, from which he graduated in 1949.

Swigert received a Bachelor of Science degree in mechanical engineering from University of Colorado in 1953, where he also played football for the Buffaloes. He later earned a Master of Science degree in aerospace engineering from Rensselaer Polytechnic Institute (Hartford campus) in 1965, and a Master of Business Administration degree from University of Hartford in 1967.

His recreational interests included golf, handball, bowling, skiing, swimming, and basketball. His hobbies included photography.

== Flight experience ==
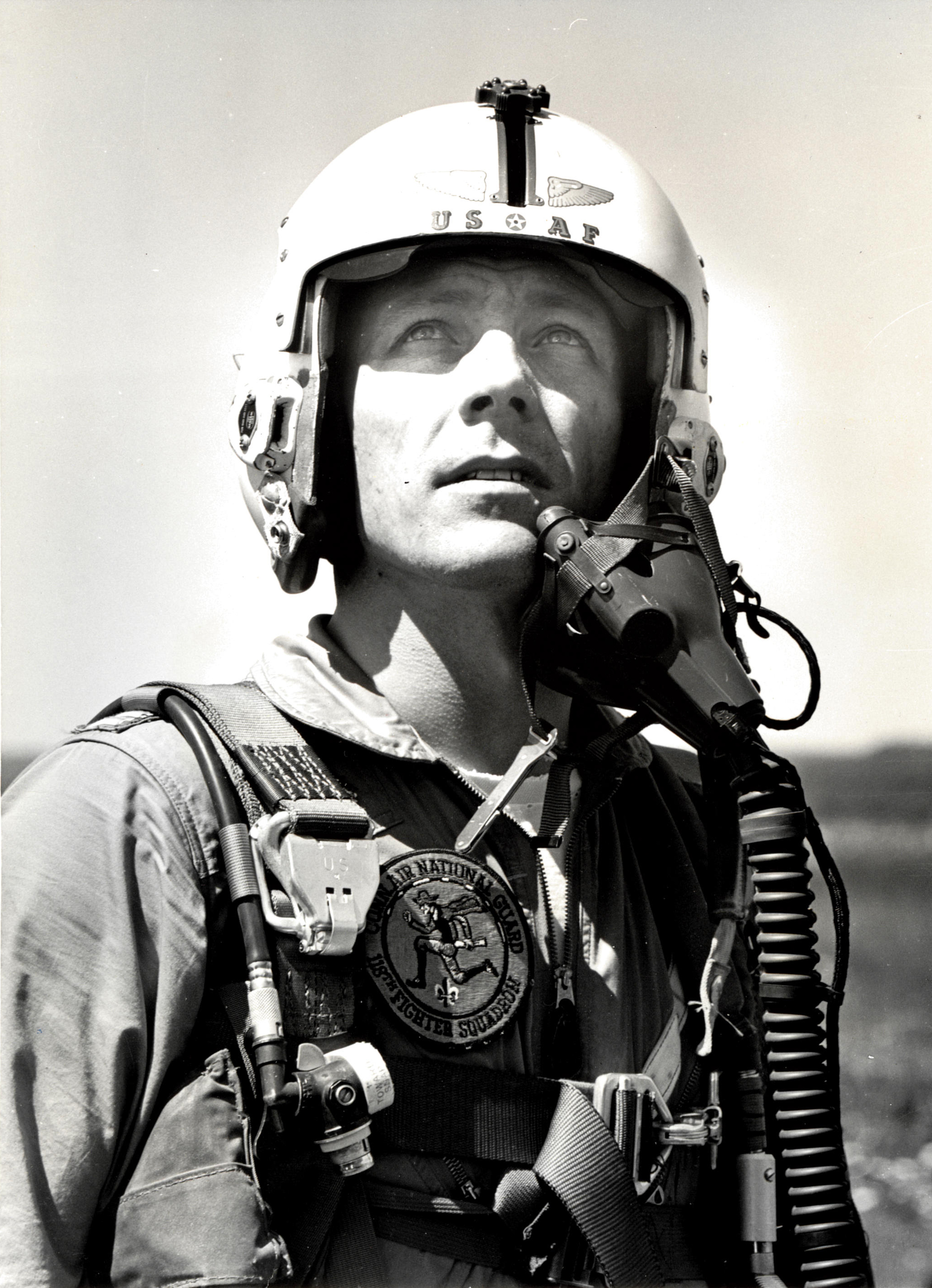
Swigert wearing his Air Force flight suit with a 118th Fighter Squadron, Connecticut Air National Guard patch

Following his graduation from Colorado in 1953, Swigert joined the United States Air Force (USAF). Upon graduation from the Pilot Training Program and Gunnery School at Nellis Air Force Base, Nevada, he was assigned as a fighter pilot in Japan and South Korea. In 1953, he survived his plane crashing into a radar unit on a Korean airstrip.

After completing his tour of active duty in the USAF, he served as a jet fighter pilot with the Massachusetts (1957–1960) and Connecticut Air National Guard (1960–1965). Swigert held a position as engineering test pilot for North American Aviation before joining NASA. He was previously an engineering test pilot for Pratt & Whitney, from February 1957 to June 1964.

He logged over 7,200 hours in flight, including more than 5,725 hours in jet aircraft.

== NASA career ==
After unsuccessfully applying for NASA's second and third astronaut selections, Swigert was accepted into the NASA Astronaut Corps as part of NASA Astronaut Group 5 in April 1966. Swigert became a specialist on the Apollo command module: he was one of the few astronauts who requested to be command module pilots.

Swigert was a member of Apollo 7's astronaut support crew, the first support crew for an Apollo mission; he served as capsule communicator (CAPCOM) during the ascent phase of the flight.

=== Apollo 13 ===
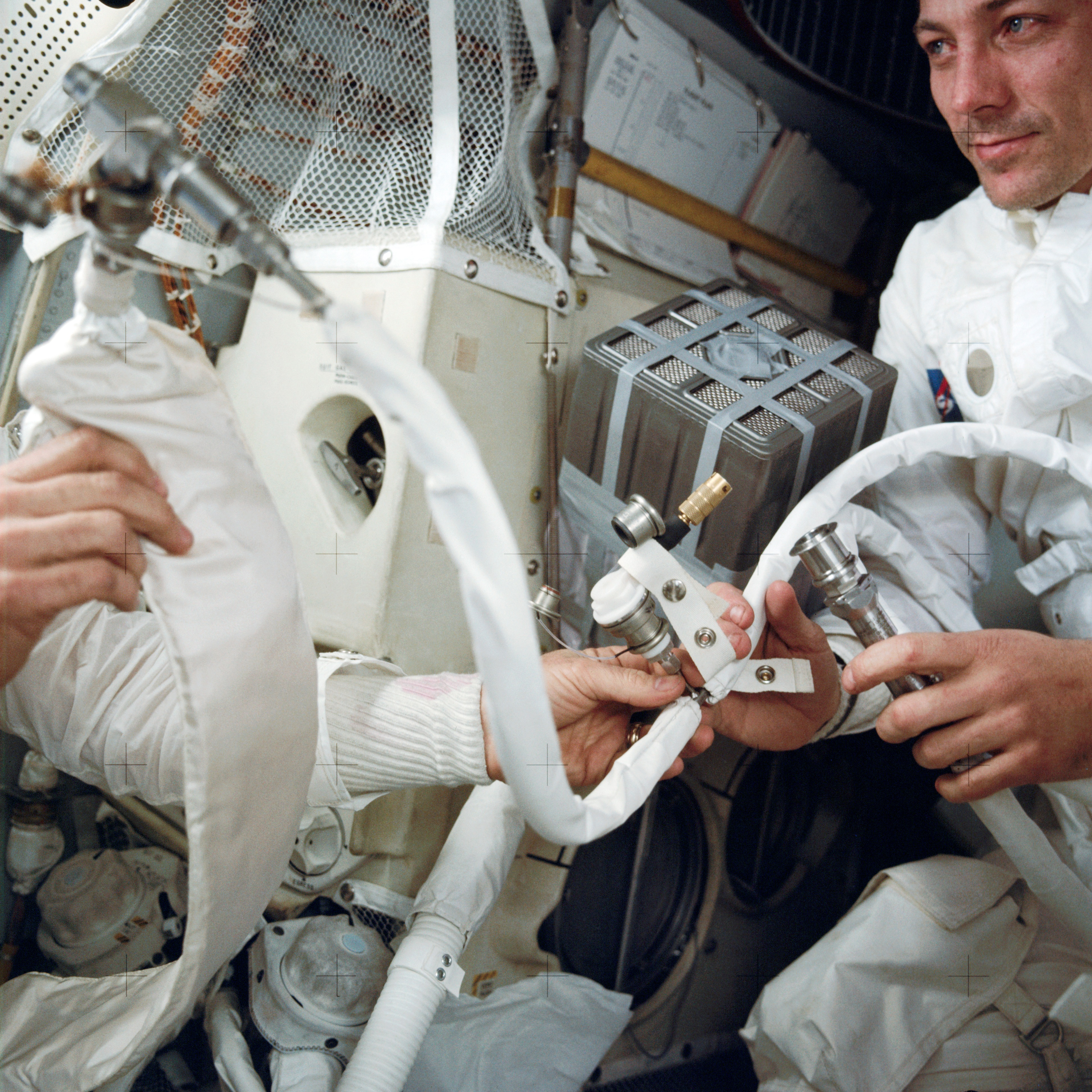
Swigert (right) with the "mailbox" rig improvised to adapt the Apollo 13 command module Odyssey's square carbon dioxide scrubber cartridges to fit the Apollo Lunar Module Aquarius, which took a round cartridge

Swigert was one of three astronauts aboard the Apollo 13 Moon mission launched April 11, 1970. Originally part of the backup crew for the mission, he was assigned to the mission three days before launch, replacing astronaut Ken Mattingly. The prime crew had been exposed to German measles (the rubella virus) from Charles Duke and, because Mattingly had no immunity to the disease, NASA did not want to risk him falling ill during critical phases of the flight.

Apollo 13 was the third crewed lunar-landing attempt, but was aborted after the rupture of an oxygen tank in the spacecraft's service module. Swigert was the astronaut who first announced, "Houston, we've had a problem here". The statement was then repeated by commander of the flight Jim Lovell. Swigert, along with fellow astronauts Lovell and Fred Haise, traveled around the Moon and returned safely to Earth on April 17 after about 5 days and 23 hours, and received the Presidential Medal of Freedom the next day.

=== Apollo–Soyuz Test Project ===
NASA Director of Flight Crew Operations Deke Slayton, who selected the astronauts, recommended Swigert as command module pilot for the Apollo–Soyuz Test Project, the first joint mission with the Soviet Union. Slayton felt Swigert deserved another chance to fly after having been selected for Apollo 13 two days before launch, and performing well.

During 1972, the Apollo 15 postal covers incident caused NASA investigators to inquire into other astronauts. A number of Apollo astronauts, including Swigert, had made agreements with West German stamp dealer Hermann Sieger, who originated the idea for the Apollo 15 covers, to autograph philatelic items in exchange for a payment of about $2,500. Swigert originally denied involvement when interviewed by NASA investigators. According to Christopher C. Kraft, the investigators subpoenaed his bank records, finding more funds than expected, and records of a predated charitable donation. Swigert's subsequent admission caused NASA Deputy Administrator George M. Low to remove him from Apollo–Soyuz.

== Post-NASA career ==
Aware that his spaceflight career was most likely over, Swigert took a leave of absence from NASA in April 1973 and went to Washington, D.C. to become executive director of the Committee on Science and Astronautics, U.S. House of Representatives.

Swigert eventually left NASA and the committee in August 1977 to enter politics. He ran for the U.S. Senate from Colorado in 1978, but was soundly defeated in the Republican primary in September by Congressman Bill Armstrong, who was far better known. In 1979, Swigert became vice president of B.D.M. Corporation in Golden. He left in 1981 to join International Gold and Minerals Limited as vice president for financial and corporate affairs.

In February 1982, Swigert left International Gold and Minerals Limited to run for U.S. Congress in the newly created 6th district as a Republican. When a malignant tumor in his right nasal passage was found, the astronaut-politician disclosed this to the voters. Doctors told him he would finish radiation treatments on June 15 and make a complete recovery. However, in August, Swigert developed back pain and was diagnosed with bone marrow cancer. On November 2, 1982, he won the seat with 64% of the vote.

== Death ==
On December 19, 1982, seven weeks after his election, he was airlifted from his home in Littleton to Georgetown University Hospital in Washington, D.C. He died of respiratory failure at its Lombardi Cancer Center on December 27, seven days before the beginning of his congressional term, aged 51. He was the last member-elect of the House to die before taking office until Luke Letlow's death from COVID-19 in December 2020. Following a special election in March 1983 Swigert was succeeded as representative by Daniel Schaefer.

Fifteen astronauts, including fellow Apollo 13 crewmates Jim Lovell and Fred Haise, were among the thousand mourners at his full military honors funeral in Denver, presided over by Archbishop James Casey, which included a missing man flyover by A-7 Corsairs of the Colorado Air National Guard. He is buried alongside his parents (although his father preceded him in death by eight years and his mother outlived him for twelve years after his death) in Mount Olivet Cemetery, Wheat Ridge.

== Awards, honors, and organizations ==
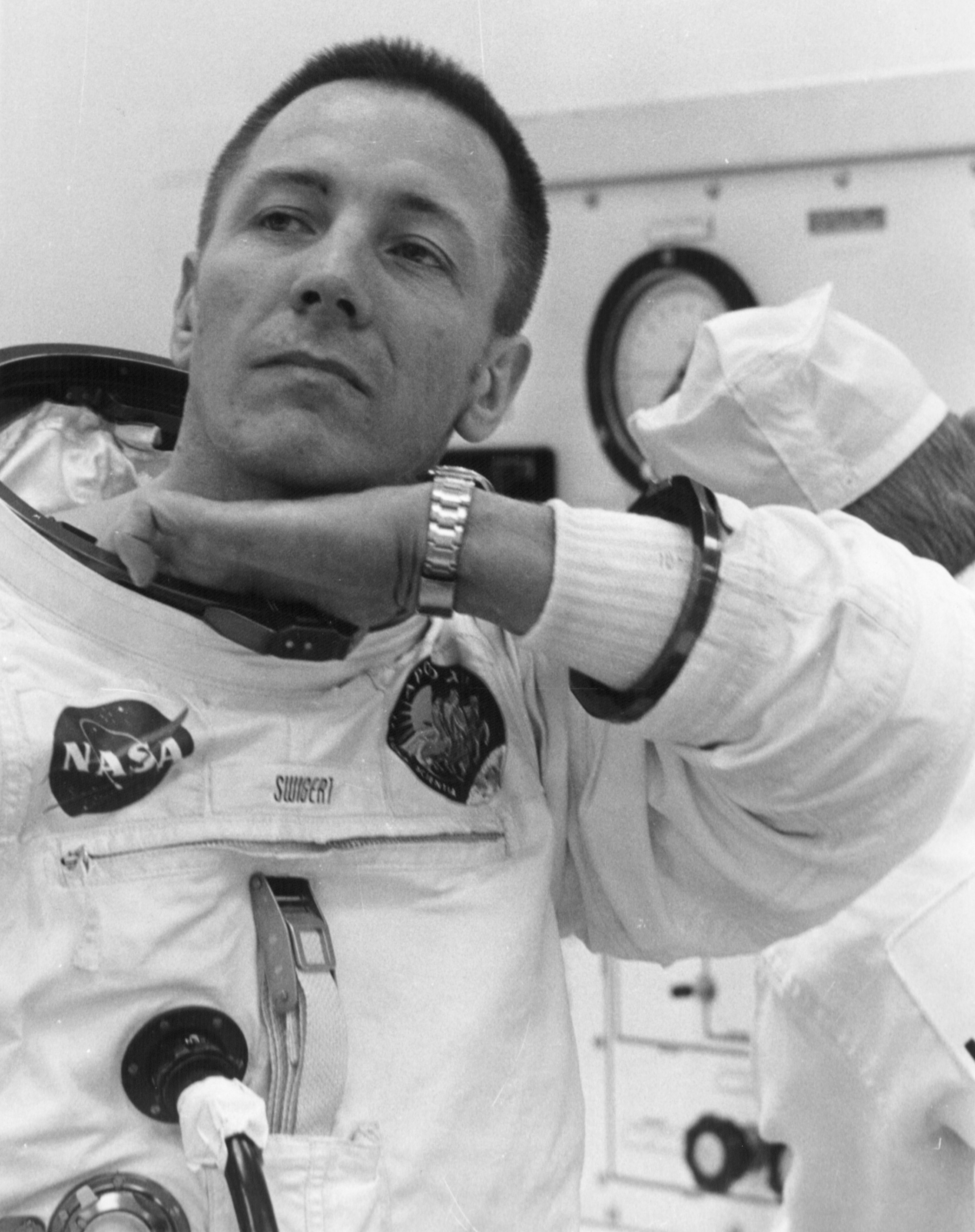
Swigert during suit-up before the launch of Apollo 13, April 11, 1970

Swigert received the American Institute of Aeronautics and Astronautics (AIAA) Octave Chanute Award for 1966 for his participation in demonstrating the Rogallo wing as a feasible land landing system for returning space vehicles and astronauts.

President Richard Nixon awarded the Presidential Medal of Freedom to the Apollo 13 crew shortly after the conclusion of their mission. Following a sparse parade, Swigert received the City of New York Gold Medal on June 3. He received the City of Houston Medal for Valor, 1970. Swigert received the American Astronautical Society Flight Achievement Award for 1970. He was given University of Colorado-Boulder's Distinguished Engineering Alumnus Award in 1970. Vice President Spiro Agnew presented the crews of Apollo 11, 12, and 13 with the NASA Distinguished Service Medal in 1970. The Apollo 13 crew also received the AIAA Haley Astronautics Award in 1971, which included a small monetary award and a medal.

Swigert was awarded the 1972 Antonian Gold Medal.

He was presented an Honorary Doctorate of Science degree from American International College in 1970, an Honorary Doctorate of Laws degree from Western State University in 1970, and an Honorary Doctorate of Science from Western Michigan University in 1970.

In 1983, Swigert was among 14 Apollo astronauts inducted into the International Space Hall of Fame.

In 1988, Swigert was inducted into the Colorado Aviation Hall of Fame.

In 1995, Swigert was portrayed by Kevin Bacon in Ron Howard's film Apollo 13.

In 1997, Swigert, along with 23 other Apollo astronauts, was posthumously inducted into the U.S. Astronaut Hall of Fame which is located at the Kennedy Space Center.

He was elected in September 2003 to the Rensselaer Polytechnic Institute Alumni Hall of Fame.

In 1997, a statue of Swigert made by George and Mark Lundeen was placed on display in the U.S. Capitol Building as one of two statues given by the state of Colorado to the National Statuary Hall Collection. As of December 2008 the statue is on display in Emancipation Hall in the United States Capitol Visitor Center. A duplicate statue is currently on display at Denver International Airport Terminal B, where passengers exit the airport's train system.

The Space Foundation was founded in 1983 in part to honor the memory and accomplishments of Swigert. In 2004, the Space Foundation launched the John L. "Jack" Swigert Jr. Award for Space Exploration, which is presented annually to an individual, group, or organization that has made a significant contribution to space exploration. On August 18, 2009, the Space Foundation and Colorado Springs District 11 partnered to open the Jack Swigert Aerospace Academy.

Swigert was a member of numerous organizations. He was a fellow of the American Astronautical Society; associate fellow of the Society of Experimental Test Pilots and the American Institute of Aeronautics and Astronautics; and member of the Quiet Birdmen, Phi Gamma Delta, Pi Tau Sigma, and Sigma Tau.

== See also ==
- List of United States representatives-elect who never took their seats
- List of spaceflight records
- Astronaut Monument

== Works cited ==
- Chaikin, Andrew (1998). A Man on the Moon. Penguin Books Ltd. ISBN 978-0-14-024146-4.
- Lovell, James A. (1975). "Chapter 13: "Houston, We've Had a Problem"" (PDF). In Cortright, Edgar M. (ed.). Apollo Expeditions to the Moon (PDF). Washington, D.C.: NASA. SP-350.
- Kraft, Christopher (2001). Flight: My Life in Mission Control. New York: Dutton. ISBN 978-0-525-94571-0.
- Slayton, Donald K. "Deke"; Cassutt, Michael (1994). Deke! U.S. Manned Space: From Mercury to the Shuttle (1st ed.). New York: Forge. ISBN 978-0-312-85503-1.

U.S. House of Representatives
New constituency	Member-elect of the U.S. House of Representatives from Colorado's 6th congressional district 1982	Succeeded by Daniel Schaefer
