= Arapahoe County, Colorado =

County in Colorado, United States

- County
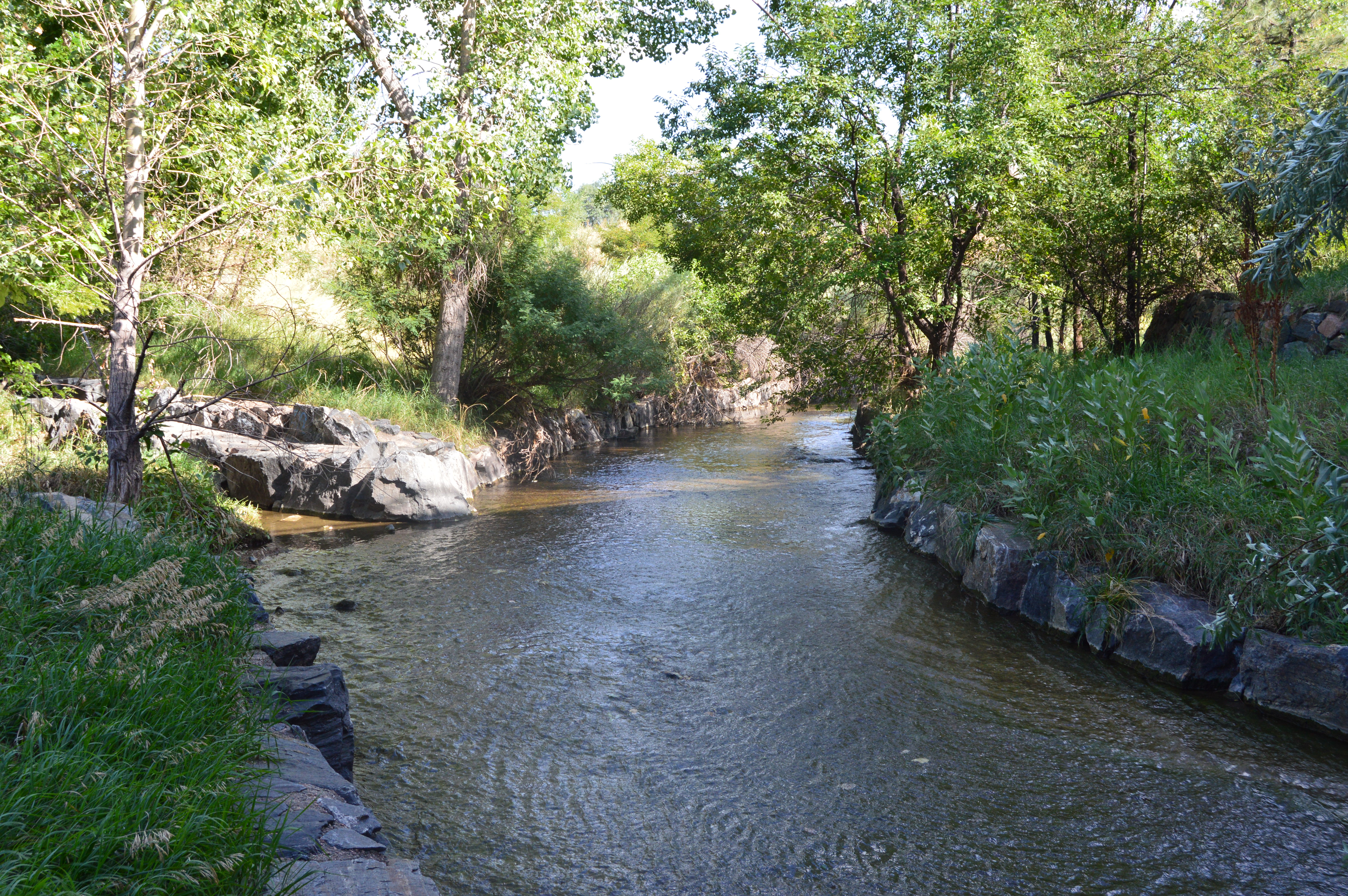
- Little Dry Creek in Englewood

- Flag Logo

- Location within the U.S. state of Colorado
- Coordinates: 39.65°N 104.67°W
- Country: United States
- State: Colorado
- Founded: November 1, 1861
- Named for: The Arapaho Nation
- Seat: Littleton
- Largest city: Aurora

Area
  - Total: 805 sq mi (2,080 km^{2})
  - Land: 798 sq mi (2,070 km^{2})
  - Water: 7.3 sq mi (19 km^{2}) 0.9%

Population (2020)
  - Total: 655,070 (3rd)
  - Estimate (2025): 673,820 ▲
  - Density: 820/sq mi (317/km^{2})
- Time zone: UTC−7 (Mountain)
  - Summer (DST): UTC−6 (MDT)
- Congressional districts: 1st, 4th, 6th
- Website: www.arapahoeco.gov

Arapahoe County (/əˈræpəhoʊ/ ə-RAP-ə-hoh) is a county located in the U.S. state of Colorado. As of the 2020 census, its population was 655,070, making it the third-most populous county in Colorado. The county seat is Littleton, and the most populous city is Aurora. The county was named for the Arapaho Native American tribe, who once lived in the region. Arapahoe County is part of the Denver-Aurora-Lakewood metropolitan statistical area. Arapahoe County calls itself "Colorado's First County", since its origins antedate the Pike's Peak Gold Rush.

== History ==
On August 25, 1855, the Kansas Territorial Legislature created a huge Arapahoe County to govern the entire western portion of the Territory of Kansas. The county was named for the Arapaho Nation, who lived in the region.

In July 1858, gold was discovered along the South Platte River in Arapahoe County (in present-day Englewood). This discovery precipitated the Pike's Peak Gold Rush. Many residents of the mining region felt disconnected from the remote territorial governments of Kansas and Nebraska, so they voted to form their own Territory of Jefferson on October 24, 1859. The following month, the Jefferson Territorial Legislature organized 12 counties for the new territory, including a smaller Arapahoe County. Denver City served as the county seat of Arapahoe County.

The Jefferson Territory never received federal sanction, and when the State of Kansas was admitted to the Union on January 29, 1861, the mining regions temporarily reverted to unorganized territory. On February 28, 1861, Congress passed an act organizing the Territory of Colorado, using present-day borders. On November 1, 1861, the Colorado Territorial Assembly organized the 17 original counties of Colorado, including a new Arapahoe County. Arapahoe County originally stretched from the line of present-day Sheridan Boulevard 160 miles (260 km) east to the Kansas border, and from the line of present-day County Line Road 30 miles (48 km) north to the 40th parallel north (168th Avenue). Denver City served as the county seat of Arapahoe County until 1902.

In 1901, the Colorado General Assembly voted to split Arapahoe County into three parts — a new consolidated City and County of Denver, a new Adams County, and the remainder of the Arapahoe County to be renamed South Arapahoe County. A ruling by the Colorado Supreme Court, subsequent legislation, and a referendum delayed the reorganization until November 15, 1902. Governor James Bradley Orman designated Littleton as the temporary county seat of South Arapahoe County. On April 11, 1903, the Colorado General Assembly changed the name of South Arapahoe County back to Arapahoe County. On November 8, 1904, Arapahoe County voters chose Littleton over Englewood by a vote of 1310 to 829 to be the permanent county seat.

== Geography ==
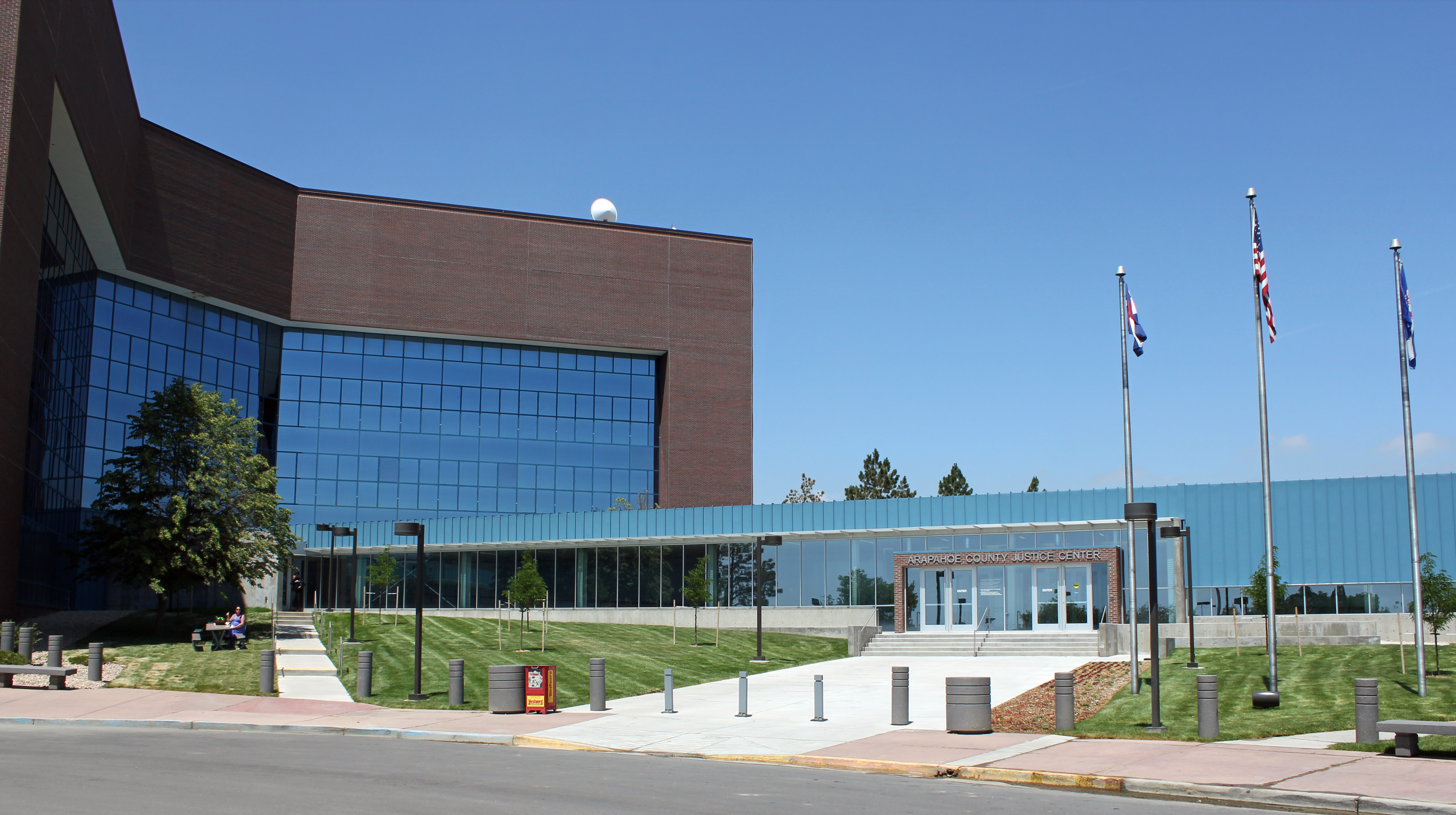
The contemporary Arapahoe County Courthouse is in Dove Valley.

According to the U.S. Census Bureau, the county has a total area of 805 square miles (2,080 km^{2}), of which 798 square miles (2,070 km^{2}) are land and 7.3 square miles (19 km^{2}) (0.9%) are covered by water. The county measures 72 mi (116 km) east-west and 4 to 12 mi (6.4 to 19.3 km) north-south.

Two exclaves of Arapahoe County are entirely surrounded by the City and County of Denver, the City of Glendale, and the Holly Hills neighborhood, a census-designated place.

=== Adjacent counties ===
- City and County of Denver – northwest and exclaves
- Adams County – north
- Washington County – east
- Lincoln County – southeast
- Elbert County – south
- Douglas County – southwest
- Jefferson County – west

=== Major highways ===
- I-25 / US 87
- I-70
  - I-70 BL (Denver)
  - I-70 BS (Watkins)
  - I-70 BS (Strasburg)
  - I-70 BS (Deer Trail)
- I-225
- US 85
- US 285
- SH 30
- SH 79
- SH 83
- SH 88
- SH 177
- CR 137(Kiowa-Bennett Road)

=== State park ===
- Cherry Creek State Park

=== Historic trails ===
- Smoky Hill Trail
- South Platte Trail

=== Recreation trails ===
- Highline Canal National Recreation Trail
- Platte River Greenway National Recreation Trail

== Demographics ==
Historical population
Census	Pop.	Note	%±
1870	6,829		—
1880	38,644		465.9%
1890	132,135		241.9%
1900	153,017		15.8%
1910	10,263		−93.3%
1920	13,766		34.1%
1930	22,647		64.5%
1940	32,150		42.0%
1950	52,125		62.1%
1960	113,426		117.6%
1970	162,142		42.9%
1980	293,621		81.1%
1990	391,511		33.3%
2000	487,967		24.6%
2010	572,003		17.2%
2020	655,070		14.5%
2025 (est.)	673,820	▲	2.9%
U.S. Decennial Census; 1790-1960 1900-1990; 1990-2000 2010-2020

=== 2020 census ===
As of the 2020 census, the county had a population of 655,070. Of the residents, 23.4% were under the age of 18 and 13.8% were 65 years of age or older; the median age was 36.6 years. For every 100 females there were 98.6 males, and for every 100 females age 18 and over there were 96.6 males. 97.9% of residents lived in urban areas and 2.1% lived in rural areas.

Arapahoe County, Colorado – Racial and ethnic composition Note: the US Census treats Hispanic/Latino as an ethnic category. This table excludes Latinos from the racial categories and assigns them to a separate category. Hispanics/Latinos may be of any race.
Race / Ethnicity (NH = Non-Hispanic)	Pop 2000	Pop 2010	Pop 2020	% 2000	% 2010	% 2020
White alone (NH)	360,744	361,747	368,047	73.93%	63.24%	56.18%
Black or African American alone (NH)	36,254	55,657	68,152	7.43%	9.73%	10.40%
Native American or Alaska Native alone (NH)	2,299	2,386	2,654	0.47%	0.42%	0.41%
Asian alone (NH)	19,021	28,595	41,855	3.90%	5.00%	6.39%
Pacific Islander alone (NH)	545	1,036	1,634	0.11%	0.18%	0.25%
Other race alone (NH)	691	1,002	3,549	0.14%	0.18%	0.54%
Mixed race or Multiracial (NH)	10,801	16,058	33,450	2.21%	2.81%	5.11%
Hispanic or Latino (any race)	57,612	105,522	135,729	11.81%	18.45%	20.72%
Total	487,967	572,003	655,070	100.00%	100.00%	100.00%

The racial makeup of the county was 60.5% White, 10.8% Black or African American, 1.0% American Indian and Alaska Native, 6.5% Asian, 0.3% Native Hawaiian and Pacific Islander, 8.3% from some other race, and 12.6% from two or more races. Hispanic or Latino residents of any race comprised 20.7% of the population.

There were 250,206 households in the county, of which 32.5% had children under the age of 18 living with them and 26.0% had a female householder with no spouse or partner present. About 26.4% of all households were made up of individuals and 9.0% had someone living alone who was 65 years of age or older.

There were 262,493 housing units, of which 4.7% were vacant. Among occupied housing units, 62.5% were owner-occupied and 37.5% were renter-occupied. The homeowner vacancy rate was 0.9% and the rental vacancy rate was 7.3%.

=== 2000 census ===
As of the census of 2000, 487,967 people, 190,909 households, and 125,809 families were residing in the county. The population density was 608 people/mi^{2} (235 people/km^{2}). The 196,835 housing units averaged 245 per square mile (95/km^{2}). The racial makeup of the county was 79.93% White, 7.67% African American, 0.66% Native American, 3.95% Asian, 0.12% Pacific Islander, 4.51% from other races, and 3.16% from two or more races. Hispanics or Latinos of any race made up 11.81% of the population.

Of the 190,909 households, 34.90% had children under the age of 18 living with them, 51.20% were married couples living together, 10.60% had a female householder with no husband present, and 34.10% were not families. About 27.00% of all households were made up of individuals, and 5.90% had someone living alone who was 65 years of age or older. The average household size was 2.53, and the average family size was 3.11.

In the county, the age distribution was 26.70% under 18, 8.60% from 18 to 24, 33.10% from 25 to 44, 23.00% from 45 to 64, and 8.60% who were 65 or older. The median age was 34 years. For every 100 females, there were 97.10 males. For every 100 females age 18 and over, there were 94.20 males.

The median income for a household was $53,570, and for a family was $63,875. Males had a median income of $41,601 versus $31,612 for females. The per capita income for the county was $28,147. About 4.20% of families and 5.80% of the population were below the poverty line, including 7.00% of those under age 18 and 5.10% of those age 65 or over.

== Education ==
=== K-12 Education ===
Arapahoe County is home to nine public school districts: Aurora, Bennett, Byers, Cherry Creek, Deer Trail, Englewood, Littleton, Sheridan, and Strasburg.

There are also several private schools throughout the county, including St. Mary's Academy in Cherry Hills Village, Regis Jesuit High School in Aurora, and Kent Denver School in Englewood.

=== Higher Education ===
Arapahoe County is home to two large community colleges: Arapahoe Community College in Littleton, and the Community College of Aurora. The county is also home to the University of Colorado Anschutz Medical Campus and the Denver South campus of Colorado Technical University, both located in Aurora.

== Politics ==
Arapahoe County was once a classic bastion of suburban conservatism. In the 1924 Colorado gubernatorial election, Republican Clarence Morley, who was openly affiliated with the Ku Klux Klan, won over 66% of the vote in Arapahoe County, a higher percentage than he received in any other county in Colorado. In addition, the county for many years was represented in congress by Republican Tom Tancredo, a hardcore conservative known for his controversial anti-immigration, anti-Catholic, and nativist political beliefs.

As the Denver Metro Area grew in the 1960s and beyond, Arapahoe County became the most Republican county in the state outside of Colorado Springs. However, heavy urbanization, demographic changes and population increases - such as the rapid diversification of Aurora's population and younger professionals in the southern suburbs - have caused the county to become much more competitive since the 1990s. It swung from a 22-point win for George H. W. Bush in 1988 to only a three-point win in 1992. By the turn of the millennium, it had become more of a suburban swing county. In 2008, the county swung over dramatically to support Barack Obama, who became the first Democrat to carry it since 1964, and only the second since 1936. It swung from a four-point win for George W. Bush in 2004 to a 13-point win for Obama in 2008. It voted for Obama by a similar margin in 2012, and provided much of Hillary Clinton's statewide margin in 2016 as Donald Trump failed to win even 40 percent of the vote in one of the worst showings for a Republican in the county's history, with the Democrats carrying the former Tech Center area Republican strongholds of Centennial and Littleton. In the 2020 election, Joe Biden turned in the strongest showing for a Democrat in over a century, becoming the first Democrat to win over 60% of the vote since 1916. Biden carried Aurora by lopsided margins and the traditionally Republican southern parts of the county by nearly 20 points: as a reflection of changing demographics and voter coalitions, Arapahoe is now the strongest suburban county for the Democrats in the Denver metro area while Republicans have gained ground in traditionally-Democratic Adams County.

Federal Representation

The bulk of the population and political strength of Arapahoe County is located in Colorado's 6th congressional district, Tancredo's former district, centered in Aurora and represented by Jason Crow. The more rural eastern parts of the county are located in the 4th District represented by Lauren Boebert while the Denver enclave portions such as Glendale and Holly Hills are in the Denver-based 1st District represented by Diana DeGette.

United States presidential election results for Arapahoe County, Colorado
Year	Republican		Democratic		Third party(ies)	
Year	No.	%	No.	%	No.	%
1880	4,214	53.36%	3,582	45.35%	102	1.29%
1884	7,133	54.17%	5,310	40.33%	725	5.51%
1888	11,541	56.55%	8,320	40.77%	547	2.68%
1892	11,331	48.11%	0	0.00%	12,222	51.89%
1896	6,057	12.33%	42,521	86.54%	556	1.13%
1900	25,469	42.11%	33,754	55.81%	1,260	2.08%
1904	1,351	62.93%	717	33.40%	79	3.68%
1908	1,514	50.50%	1,340	44.70%	144	4.80%
1912	765	20.15%	1,379	36.33%	1,652	43.52%
1916	1,443	33.91%	2,652	62.33%	160	3.76%
1920	2,930	59.80%	1,752	35.76%	218	4.45%
1924	4,267	64.23%	1,209	18.20%	1,167	17.57%
1928	6,086	70.29%	2,463	28.44%	110	1.27%
1932	4,287	40.28%	5,796	54.46%	559	5.25%
1936	4,272	38.24%	6,489	58.09%	410	3.67%
1940	7,988	50.89%	7,571	48.24%	137	0.87%
1944	9,057	54.52%	7,485	45.06%	69	0.42%
1948	7,943	52.67%	6,962	46.17%	175	1.16%
1952	15,402	60.32%	9,843	38.55%	289	1.13%
1956	19,716	63.11%	11,351	36.33%	176	0.56%
1960	26,379	60.07%	17,400	39.62%	137	0.31%
1964	23,071	44.92%	27,940	54.40%	347	0.68%
1968	33,712	59.65%	18,569	32.85%	4,238	7.50%
1972	52,283	72.24%	18,631	25.74%	1,462	2.02%
1976	63,154	63.45%	33,685	33.85%	2,687	2.70%
1980	79,594	62.19%	30,148	23.56%	18,238	14.25%
1984	107,556	71.92%	39,891	26.67%	2,107	1.41%
1988	95,926	60.24%	61,113	38.38%	2,206	1.39%
1992	72,221	39.26%	66,607	36.21%	45,107	24.52%
1996	82,778	50.79%	68,306	41.91%	11,912	7.31%
2000	97,768	51.47%	82,614	43.49%	9,560	5.03%
2004	119,475	51.42%	110,262	47.45%	2,628	1.13%
2008	113,868	42.78%	148,224	55.69%	4,064	1.53%
2012	125,588	43.99%	153,905	53.90%	6,023	2.11%
2016	117,053	38.63%	159,885	52.76%	26,110	8.62%
2020	127,323	36.36%	213,607	61.00%	9,253	2.64%
2024	125,311	38.48%	190,725	58.57%	9,595	2.95%

United States Senate election results for Arapahoe County, Colorado2
Year	Republican		Democratic		Third party(ies)	
Year	No.	%	No.	%	No.	%
2020	136,713	39.21%	204,054	58.53%	7,879	2.26%

United States Senate election results for Arapahoe County, Colorado3
Year	Republican		Democratic		Third party(ies)	
Year	No.	%	No.	%	No.	%
2022	96,033	37.32%	154,678	60.11%	6,606	2.57%

Colorado Gubernatorial election results for Arapahoe County
Year	Republican		Democratic		Third party(ies)	
Year	No.	%	No.	%	No.	%
2022	89,656	34.87%	162,304	63.12%	5,166	2.01%

== Communities ==
=== Cities ===
- Aurora (most; also extends into Adams County and Douglas County)
- Centennial
- Cherry Hills Village
- Englewood
- Glendale (exclave completely surrounded by the city of Denver)
- Greenwood Village
- Littleton (most; also extends into Douglas County and Jefferson County)
- Sheridan

=== Towns ===
- Bennett (part; also extends into Adams County)
- Bow Mar (part; also extends into Jefferson County)
- Columbine Valley
- Deer Trail
- Foxfield

=== Census-designated places ===
- Aetna Estates
- Brick Center
- Byers
- Cherry Creek
- Columbine (part; also extends into Jefferson County)
- Comanche Creek
- Dove Valley
- Four Square Mile
- Holly Hills (exclave located within the city of Denver)
- Inverness
- Peoria
- Strasburg (part; also extends into Adams County)
- Watkins (part; also extends into Adams County)

=== Former census-designated places ===
- Castlewood (now part of Centennial)
- Southglenn (now part of Centennial)

== See also ==
- Bibliography of Colorado
- Geography of Colorado
- History of Colorado
  - Arapahoe County, Kansas Territory
  - Arrappahoe County, Jefferson Territory
  - Arapahoe County, Colorado Territory
  - South Arapahoe County, Colorado
  - National Register of Historic Places listings in Arapahoe County, Colorado
- Index of Colorado-related articles
- List of Colorado-related lists
  - List of counties in Colorado
  - List of statistical areas in Colorado
- Outline of Colorado
  - Arapahoe Library District
  - Front Range Urban Corridor
