= Arapahoe Library District =

Public library in Arapahoe County, Colorado

- 39.577872°N 104.839032°W
- Location: Arapahoe County, Colorado, United States
- Type: Public library
- Established: 1966
- Branches: 8 (Byers, Centennial, Deer Trail, Denver, Four Square Mile)

Access and use
- Circulation: 5M
- Population served: 212,000

Other information
- Website: http://arapahoelibraries.org/

Arapahoe Library District is a public library located in Arapahoe County, Colorado with branches in Byers, Centennial, Denver, Deer Trail, and Four Square Mile. Outreach services and services to the Arapahoe County Detention Facility are also provided.

It was established in April 1966 by action of the Arapahoe County Board of Commissioners and the Board of School District 26J, Deer Trail, to meet the needs of Arapahoe County residents in the unincorporated areas and the smaller towns and communities that did not receive library service. At that time, only the cities of Aurora, Englewood, and Littleton provided library service to their residents.

== Overview ==
Organization of the District follows the provisions for establishment of library districts as defined in Colorado Library Law, Title 24 of the Colorado Revised Statutes. A seven-member Board of Trustees governs the Library District, establishes policies and employs a Library Director to carry out the policies and manage the Library District. All Board of Trustees positions are "at-large". Trustees serve a term of three years, renewable for up to three terms, and are not paid for the work that they do for the Library District.

Growth in the Library District has been steady and rapid. In 1966, the population served was estimated to be 27,000 and 40 years later, in 2007, the population served was estimated to be more than 200,000.

In addition to circulating over 5 million books, audio books, music CDs and DVDs in 2010, the Arapahoe Library District’s website provides access to the library catalog, downloadable audio books, over 40 research databases, and advisory services. The library ranked sixth in Hennen's American Public Library Ratings in 2008.

The Arapahoe Library Friends Foundation serves as the fundraising arm for the Library District. It is legally a component unit of the Library District and holds an official 501c3 status, which allows for tax deductible contributions. Within the Foundation there is a committee called the Friends, which is more commonly known as the Friends of the Arapahoe Library District. The Friends group has a Board that oversees the activities of the membership group that numbers nearly 500 members. The Friends work to raise money for the Library District through used book sales, supported primarily through donated books from patrons.

== Special services ==
- Downloadable materials including music, ebooks and digital audiobooks from OverDrive, Inc., streaming video from Hoopla (digital media service) and Kanopy.
- Library patrons can access reference help in person, by phone, via e-mail, or through the Book A Librarian service.
- Begin with Books introduces the joy of books and reading to preschool children in daycare homes, well-baby clinics and other locations in the community.
- Services and programs for those seeking American citizenship, including English Conversation Circles. Some staff members speak Spanish or Russian.
- Sheridan, Smoky Hill, Eloise May, and Koelbel libraries are designated Family Place Libraries, offering resources for early literacy and learning. This includes four week long Play and Learn workshops facilitated by early childhood specialists and staff, offered twice a year at these locations.

The District also offers free computer classes, e-mail newsletters, computers for public use, and wireless internet access. Patrons may participate in book clubs or hear recorded stories over the telephone. Research librarians are available to patrons and teachers. The District subscribes to many research databases with access to hundreds of full-text magazine articles, including many from EBSCO Information Services.

Outside of the library buildings, the district offers bookmobile service to areas of the county without a physical library nearby and materials delivery for homebound patrons.
