= Daniel Schaefer =

American politician (1936–2006)

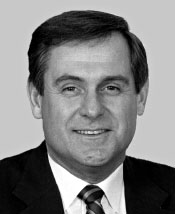

Member of the U.S. House of Representatives from Colorado's 6th district
- In office March 29, 1983 – January 3, 1999
- Preceded by: Vacant (Note: Jack Swigert was elected in 1982, but died before assuming office.)
- Succeeded by: Tom Tancredo

Member of the Colorado Senate
- In office January 9, 1979 – March 31, 1983
- Preceded by: Robert W. Smedley
- Succeeded by: Kathy S. Arnold
- Constituency: 13th district (1979–1983); 22nd district (1983)

Member of the Colorado House of Representatives from the 28th district
- In office January 1977 – January 1979
- Preceded by: Laura Miller
- Succeeded by: Kathy S. Arnold

Personal details
- Born: January 25, 1936 Guttenberg, Iowa, U.S.
- Died: April 16, 2006 (aged 70) Wheat Ridge, Colorado, U.S.
- Party: Republican
- Education: Niagara University (BA)

Military service
- Allegiance: United States
- Branch/service: United States Marine Corps
- Years of service: 1955–1957
- Rank: Sergeant

Daniel Schaefer (January 25, 1936 – April 16, 2006) was an American politician who served as the U.S. representative for Colorado's 6th congressional district from 1983 to 1999.

== Early life and education ==
Born in Guttenberg, Iowa, he attended public schools. He received his Bachelor of Arts degree from Niagara University. He also attended Potsdam University from 1961 to 1964.

== Career ==
Schaefer served in the United States Marine Corps from 1955 to 1957 and attained the rank of sergeant. He then worked as a public relations consultant.

In 1976, he was elected to a two-year term in the Colorado General Assembly. Two years later, he was elected to the Colorado State Senate, where he served from 1979 to 1983. He was a delegate to Colorado State Republican conventions between 1972 and 1982.

Schaefer was elected as a Republican to the Ninety-eighth United States Congress, by special election, to fill the vacancy caused by the death of United States Representative-elect Jack Swigert, a former astronaut who died of cancer before he could take his seat in Congress. Schaefer polled 49,816 votes (63 percent) in the special election to 27,779 ballots (35 percent) for the Democrat Steve Hogan. No Democrat challenged Schaefer in 1984. In successive elections from 1986 to 1996, he polled more than 60 percent of the vote against each of his Democratic opponents. In his last race in 1996, he received 146,018 votes (62 percent) to 88,600 ballots (38 percent) for the Democrat Joan Fitz-Gerald.

Schaefer did not run for re-election to the 106th United States Congress in 1998. He was succeeded by Republican Congressman Tom Tancredo.

== Death ==
Schaefer died of cancer at the age of 70.

== Notes ==
U.S. House of Representatives
Preceded by New constituency (Note: Jack Swigert was elected in the 1982 general election, but died before the beginning of the Congressional term.)	Member of the U.S. House of Representatives from Colorado's 6th congressional district 1983 – 1999	Succeeded by Tom Tancredo
