= Foxfield Races =

- Class: Maiden and Claims
- Location: Foxfield Steeplechase Course, Charlottesville, Virginia
- Inaugurated: 1978
- Race type: Thoroughbred - Steeplechase
- Website: www.foxfieldraces.com

Race information
- Distance: 2 1/8 miles (17 furlongs; 3,420 m)
- Surface: Turf
- Track: left-handed
- Purse: $95,000 between 5 races 1st: $15,000 max (2015)

The Foxfield Races are a set of steeplechase races that originated in 1978 and are held twice annually in Albemarle County, Virginia, approximately eight miles northwest of downtown Charlottesville. It is a popular tradition for much of the community as well as students of the University of Virginia and other universities on the East Coast. Foxfield holds two races each year, one in the fall and another in the spring. The fall race has a more family-friendly atmosphere, while the spring race tends to attract a larger proportion of local college students. Each race generally benefits a local organization or charity; previous groups include Service Dogs of Virginia, the Ronald McDonald House, and Kids Pan Alley. There are many different color passes that can be purchased allowing access to certain areas in and around the track itself. Tickets can be purchased from the official website or from numerous outlets around the Charlottesville area, as well as surrounding areas. Traditionally, students and other attendees dress in a Southern, aristocratic style often seen at other steeplechase and horse racing events across the South. Seersucker, bowties, and pastel colors predominate the atmosphere, particularly at the spring race.

== History ==
The Foxfield Races are premier steeplechase horse racing events held annually in Albemarle, Virginia. The races take place twice a year: the last Saturday in April, and the last Sunday in September. The races were created by Mariann de Tejeda on property that was once owned by the well-known Virginian horseman, huntsman, and teacher, Grover Vandevender. The property was originally a private horse farm. When De Tejeda bought the property after Vandevender's death in 1973, she began the construction of a steeplechase course dedicated to his memory. The final product fulfilled the dreams envisioned by de Tejeda and the late Vandevender. The first Foxfield race was held in the spring of 1978, and has since become a popular tradition among Charlottesville residents, students of the University of Virginia, as well as alumni from the university. Foxfield is a tailgating event, and thus, unlike many steeplechase racing events, there are no grandstands. There are many different ticket options for the race, hence some purchase general admission tickets and observe the race along the hillsides of the course. Furthermore, there are many sponsors of the race, and businesses are able to rent out private tents. Attendees of the race are known to wear fairly formal clothing, and even tailgates with elaborate spreads of elegant china and linens reflect upon this image.

=== Spring races: a UVA tradition ===
The Foxfield Races are a longstanding University of Virginia tradition. Some chide the event as the pinnacle representation of the upper middle class nature of UVA's student demographic. Students use Race Day as an excuse to break out their “preppiest” attire. There is an abundance of pastel colors, Lilly Pulitzer patterns, and large sun hats. Girls are found wearing sundresses, and many boys don a colorful bowtie for the occasion. Students tailgate at plots which are often organized through Greek organizations or other student groups.

Each spring the Foxfield Races hold a “black tie” event the evening before the big race. The event supports local charities.

=== Fall races: family weekend ===
Each fall the Foxfield Races holds a fall race and family weekend. The fall races sees an attendance of around 3,000 to 4,000 people year, a number small in comparison to the 25,000 that attend the spring race each year. Family weekend is a more relaxed atmosphere than that of the spring race. The activities are directed toward family participation. A Kids Activity Zone include stick pony races, a bounce house, games and craft activities. It is held each year on the last Sunday of September and benefits a local organization. Past beneficiaries include the Service Dogs of Virginia Foundation and the Shelter for Help and Emergency. This race targets the Charlottesville area as well as its surrounding communities.

== Race day ==
=== Watching the races ===
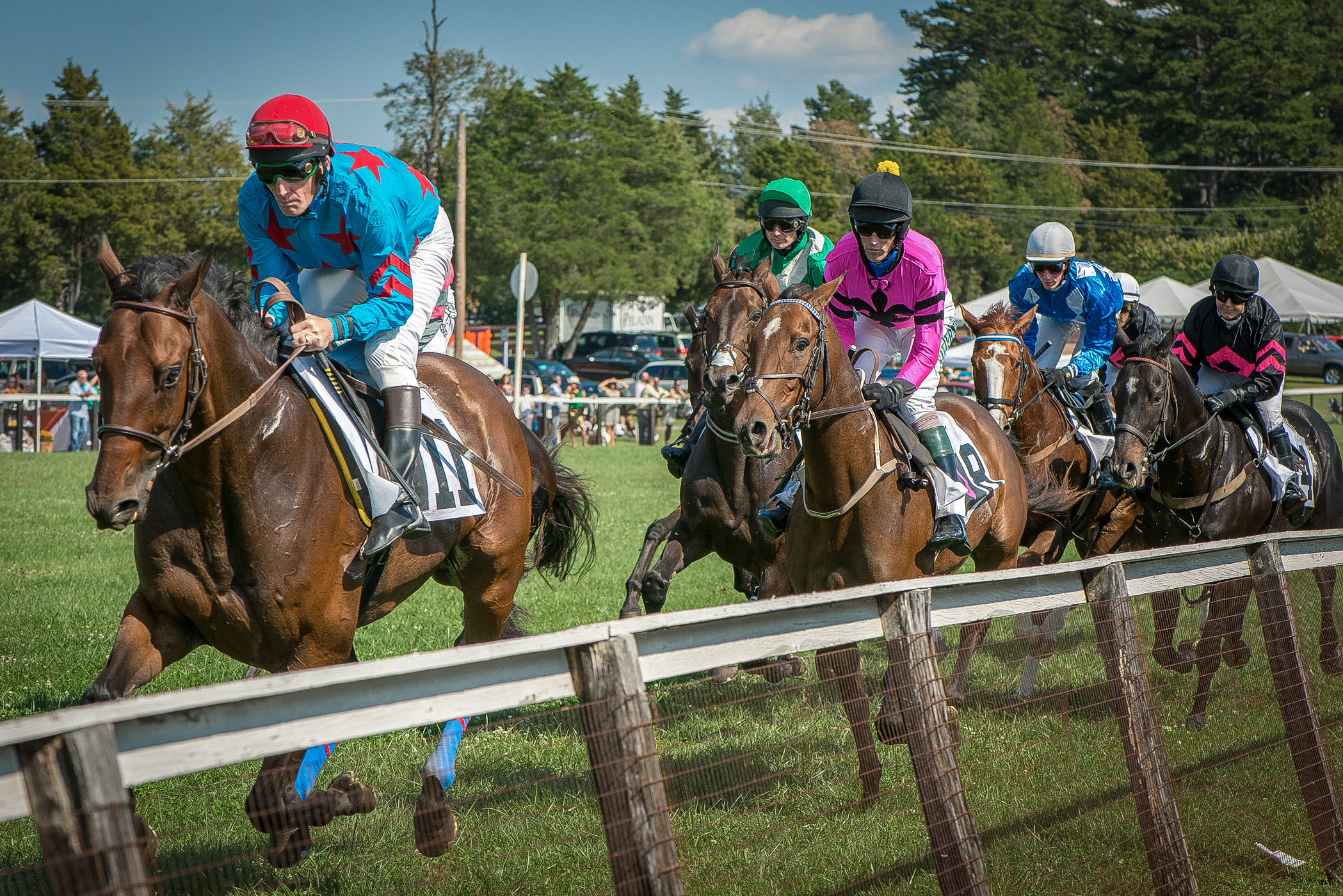
Foxfield, 2012

Watching a steeplechase race is a rather simple undertaking, as it is the horse that comes over the finish line first that wins. However, before this occurs, several steps must be undergone. First, the horse's trainer must officially declare that the horse is on grounds for a specified period before the beginning of its race. Furthermore, the rider must report to the clerk of scales and weigh out with the minimum prescribed weight. If the jockey and his gear do not meet the minimum weight requirement, lead is inserted into the saddle pad. At the specified time, the horse, trainer, and jockey must report to the paddock area or saddling enclosure. It is there that the horse is tacked up with a racing bridle and saddle, the proper girth straps, and a number cloth. The paddock judge then checks the horse as well as the jockey's silks. After approval, the horses are then paraded to the post and come under starter's orders. The starter of the race always tries to arrange a start that is fair for all of the horses and jockeys. At the drop of the tape or flags, the race begins. During the race, the horses must stay on the prescribed track, and, if obstacles are involved, they must jump over each one in the proper order. There must not be interference by horses and jockeys with the other horses and jockeys. At the end of the race, the placing judges note the horses and jockeys order of finish. At this point, the riders and their horses return to the judges’ area and wait for permission to be dismounted, though at this time no one is allowed to touch the rider or tack until he has weighed in. And finally, with no objections, and if the patrol judges report that all went smoothly and the jockeys weigh in with their original start of the race weight, the unofficial race results are declared official. At the Foxfield Races, there are no grandstands; therefore viewers are encouraged to walk up to the straight-away or fences where they are able to see the race up close.

=== Viewing areas and accommodations ===
Given the lack of grandstands at the race, spectators are divided into multiple viewing areas. Access to these areas is generally determined by the type (or color) of ticket the spectator purchases. The different colors correspond to the location of the viewing area.

- Orange section: the Orange section is one of two areas in the infield of the racetrack, and is generally reserved for students. This section also includes the race tower, paddock, and president's tent.
- Green section: the Green section is the second of the two areas in the infield of the racetrack, and generally holds students, alumni, and the general public.
- Blue section: the Blue section is located on the outside rail, and is open to the general public.
- Purple and Pink sections: the Pink and Purple sections are also located on the outside rail, and hold event sponsors and patrons.
- Yellow section: the Yellow section is also on the outside rail, and is available to seniors and the handicapped.

The Foxfield Racing Association also set up two more exclusive viewing areas to appeal to sponsors of the event.

- Chalet Tents: These are tents located on the infield of the races, separated from the Orange and Green sections. Chalet tents offer a larger amount of space than a normal plot on the infield and also provide a more social environment that contrasts the private environment of the South Hill Tent area. The Tents are about 400 sq. ft. and are welcomed to large parties and entertainment.
- South Hill: This is a tent area located on the outfield of the race that is removed from other viewing sections in a more private location. The tent area also includes its own parking so that those going to the South Hill Tent area do not have to be a part of the Foxfield traffic around the East and West Gate entrances. In the past groups such as the Charlottesville Young Professionals, Wintergreen Performing Arts Center etc. have all rented out South Hill Tents in order to bring groups of people together to meet and get to know one another.

== Sponsorships ==
Every year the Foxfield Racing Association (FRA) allows a large number of corporations to come sponsor the Foxfield Races. This allows a company to promote their products to the large number of people that attend the Foxfield Races each year. Also this as a way to provide entertainment for fellow employees, families, and prospects. By becoming a sponsor, the company is offered a variety of specialty packages.

== Environmental initiatives ==
=== Go Green ===
As a part of 2009 Foxfield Races, the Foxfield Racing Association (FRA) has initiated a “Go Green” Program which encourages people attending the races to not use glass and to start recycling their cans. As a part of the “Go Green” program the FRA will now transport all trash from the races to a recycling center and not a landfill. Also another part of the program is that the FRA has provided large containers (supplied by the company Container Rentals) for attendees to put filled trash bags. This program is a reply to the complaints of many civilians and people of the amount of trash that is left behind or found after the Spring Foxfield race, and as a response to the cooler size change which will lead to a large increase in Styrofoam coolers.

== Liability and safety ==
=== Alcohol policies ===
Out of the approximately 23,000 patrons attending the event, about 8,000 are college students who attend the University of Virginia and other schools. Patrons 21 and older are allowed to drink alcohol at Foxfield on race day. In the past, this demographic has worn “over 21” armbands, but since 2009 ID checking has become the norm. Patrons must carry their IDs all day as ABC agents and police will be checking the IDs of spectators.

In 2008 Albemarle County Commonwealth Attorney Denise Lunsford was quoted saying “What in the past has been sometimes loosely referred to as 'the Foxfields discount’ will not be the case anymore”. From this point onward crimes committed at the races would no longer be seen as a minor offense, but would be treated with the same weight as a regular crime. Also the regulations of 2008 brought about the ban of alcohol-related items such as ice luges, and beer bongs.

A student-formed group at the University of Virginia called “Alcohol and Drug Abuse Prevention Team” (ADAPT) partners with a number of groups to promote protective drinking behavior and safe transportation options at the Foxfield Races. The group has coordinated student education programs at UVA to inform students how to minimize the risks of drinking and provide alternatives for getting home. In the past, the program has been held as a panel discussion made up of ADAPT members, the Foxfield Racing Association, local police and Alcoholic Beverage Control agents, the local commonwealth's attorney, the Rescue Squad, and the UVA dean of students. The Foxfield Racing Association funds a non-drinking driver program called “The Savvy Fox”. This program is administered by ADAPT. If a patron signs the Savvy Fox Pledge at the race meet, thy agree to be a designated driver and not drink all day, and receive a coupon for lunch and free non-alcoholic drinks. The sign up tables and distribution area are a part of the ADAPT safety tent. In 2008, 466 individuals signed the Savvy Fox Pledge.

=== Medical safety ===
There are three first aid stations at Foxfield on the day of the races. These stations are staffed by the UVA Emergency Department and are identified by a large white flag with a green first aid cross. The three station locations are: in between the airplane hangar and the West Gate, in the Orange student section, and in the Green section just after the crossing gate.

== Past winners ==
These are the winners of the past ten years of the Spring and Fall Foxfield horse races. Each race is made up of about six or seven races depending on the year, and the weather of that year. The purses vary with each race. Some of the races have no purse because the race was labeled as a “training flat” meaning that it was just a race on the turf of the track, no hurdles or fences.

Year of Race	Race	Winner	Weight	Rider	Owner	Trainer	Total Purse
Spring '09	Race 1	Flight Briefing	144	Jody Petty	Augustin Stable	Sanna N. Hendriks	25,000
	Race 2	Good Night Shirt	155	William Dowling	Harold A. Via, Jr.	Jack Fisher	
	Race 3	Westfield Dancer (Ire)	165	Richard Spate	Lucy Horner	Barbara McWade	15,000
	Race 4	Perkedinthesand	150	Jeff Murphy	Mrs. S. K. Johnston, Jr.	Jack Fisher	25,000
	Race 5	Eagle Beagle	152	Paddy Young	Barracuda Stable	Ricky Hendriks	10,000
Fall ‘08	Race 1	Prancing Cat	156	Paddy Young	Magalen O. Bryant	Doug Fout	10,000
	Race 2	Hymn To Happiness	150	Danielle Hodsdon	Jonathan E. Sheppard	Jonathan E. Sheppard	
	Race 3	Cradle Will Rock	144	Danielle Hodsdon	Jonathan E. Sheppard	Jonathan E. Sheppard	10,000
	Race 4	Zozimus	154	Jody Petty	Dale K. Thiel	Sanna N. Hendriks	15,000
	Race 5	Never Fear	168	William Santoro	Kinross Farm	Neil R. Morris	
	Race 6	Smartest One	155	James Slater	Ellen Horner	Ellen Horner	5,000
Spring '08	Race 1	Discreet Charmer	144	Paddy Young	Brigadoon Stable	Doug Fout	15,000
	Race 2	Diego Cao (NZ)	155	Paddy Young	Brigadoon Stable	Doug Fout	
	Race 3	Rochester	165	Jody Petty	Augustin Stable	Sanna N. Hendriks	15,000
	Race 4	Sound Blaster (Ire)	173	H. Brooks Durkee	Bear Creek Stable	Jack Fisher	15,000
	Race 5	Class Shadow	145	Richard Boucher	Mede Cahaba Stable	Lilith Boucher	25,000
Fall ‘07	Race 1	Soy Desatanudos (Arg)	152	Colvin Ryan	Robert & Edward Bonnie Julie Gomena	10,000	
	Race 2	Heir Apparent (Saf)	155	Rylee Zimmerman	Manown Kisor, Jr.	Michael Berryman	
	Race 3	Tenacious Rhythm	156	Paddy Young	Barracuda Stable	Ricky Hendriks	10,000
	Race 4	Gather No Moss	139	Rylee Zimmerman	Manown Kisor, Jr.	Michael Berryman	10,000
	Race 5	Harry's Firebolt	154	Matthew McCarron	Russell Looney	Doug Fout	15,000
	Race 6	Patriot's Path	168	Russell Haynes	Irvin S. Naylor	Bruce Haynes	
	Race 7	Xtra Smart	150	Carl Rafter	Alix L. White	A. Timothy White	5,000
Spring ‘07	Race 1	Humdinger	150	Christopher Read	Kinross Farm	Neil R. Morris	15,000
	Race 2	Praise the Prince (NZ)	165	Paddy Young	Augustin Stable	Sanna N. Hendriks	10,000
	Race 3	Thegooddieyoung	176	Christopher Read	Kinross Farm	Neil R. Morris	15,000
	Race 4	Legend's Silver	156	Paddy Young	Augustin Stable	Sanna N. Hendriks	10,000
	Race 5	Church Ghost	139	Jeff Murphy	Margaret R. White	Doug Fout	20,000
	Race 6	Gold Mitten	160	Christopher Read	Kinross Farm	Neil R. Morris	
Fall '06	Race 1	Defrocked	156	Matthew McCarron	Kinross Farm	Neil R. Morris	10,000
	Race 2	BK's Double Jade	155	Adam Helders	Karen M. Gray	Karen M. Gray	
	Race 3	Gold Mitten	152	Carl Rafter	Kinross Farm	Neil R. Morris	
	Race 4	Looking Best	154	Xavier Aizpuru	Mrs. F. Eugene Dixon Jr.	Jack Fisher	10,000
	Race 5	Slattery	150	Jody Petty	Crestview Farm	Sanna N. Hendriks	15,000
	Race 6	Hot Springs	168	Desmond Fogarty	Irvin S. Naylor	Jack Fisher	
	Race 7	Road Hazord	155	Jeff Murphy	Donald Yovanovich	Donald Yovanovich	5,000
Spring ‘06	Race 1	Hot Springs	154	Paddy Young	Irvin S. Naylor	Sanna N. Hendriks	15,000
	Race 2	Wicklow Bound	142	William Santoro	Mrs. S. K. Johnston, Jr.	Alicia S. Murphy	10,000
	Race 3	Bow Strada (GB)	175	Darren Nagle	Calvin Houghland	F. Bruce Miller	15,000
	Race 4	Reflector	156	Colvin Ryan	Colvin G. Ryan	Julie Gomena	10,000
	Race 5	Lucky Chap	144	Carl Rafter	Randleston Farm	Jimmy Day	20,000
	Race 6	Flying Visit (NZ)	165	Paddy Young	Augustin Stable	Sanna N. Hendriks	10,000
Fall ‘05	Race 1	Gather No Moss	152	Xavier Aizpuru	Kinross Farm	Neil R. Morris	10,000
	Race 2	Statement (Ire)	155	Zach Miller	Brigadoon Stable	Doug Fout	
	Race 3	U K Limey	152	Robert Walsh	Waterford Farm	Paul A. Rowland	10,000
	Race 4	Gallant Turk	168	Adam Helders	Gone Away Farm	Dabney S. Thompson	
	Race 5	Ghost Valley	165	Jody Petty	Augustin Stable	Sanna N. Hendriks	15,000
	Race 6	Top Of The Bill	155	Carl Rafter	Randleston Farm	Jimmy Day	3,000
Spring ‘05	Race 1	Noble Bob	144	Jody Petty	Circa Farms	Ricky Hendriks	15,000
	Race 2	No Fast Moves	160	Christopher Read	Kinross Farm	Neil R. Morris	10,000
	Race 3	High Watermark	167	Zach Miller	Jacqueline L. Ohrstrom	Richard L. Valentine	10,000
	Race 4	Irish Actor	152	Cyril Murphy	Otto Stolz	Ricky Hendriks	20,000
	Race 5	Capwaynesglass	146	Carl Rafter	Daybreak Stables	Jimmy Day	10,000
	Race 6	Invest West	180	Stewart Strawbridge	Augustin Stable	Sanna N. Hendriks	7,500
Fall ‘04	Race 1	Thegooddieyoung	151	Zach Miller	Est. of Kathleen Jeffords	F. Bruce Miller	10,000
	Race 2	Lord Louis	150	Paddy Young	Harold A. Via, Jr.	Jack Fisher	
	Race 3	Kenny's Crossing	155	Xavier Aizpuru	Dale K. Thiel	Ricky Hendriks	10,000
	Race 4	Dixie Colony	165	Robert Massey	Tina McDaniel	Sanna N. Hendriks	4,000
	Race 5	Allimac (Ire)	160	Paddy Young	Irvin S. Naylor	Jack Fisher	10,000
	Race 6	Gallant Turk	180	Ted Thompson	Gone Away Farm	Dabney S. Thompson	
Spring ‘04	Race 1	AJ Cielo	154	Robert Massey	Otto Stolz	Katherine Neilson	15,000
	Race 2	Lumiere Sprout (Arg)	155	Robert Massey	Mrs. S. K. Johnston, Jr.	Katherine Neilson	
	Race 3	The Greyling	144	Colvin Ryan	Estate of Emily Hutchinson	Michael Berryman	15,000
	Race 4	Mr. Fater	165	Matthew McCarron	Over Creek Farm	Julie Gomena	10,000
	Race 5	Preferred Guest	152	Xavier Aizpuru	Harold A. Via, Jr.	Jack Fisher	20,000
	Race 6	Where Echo's End	146	Matthew McCarron	Kinross Farm	Neil R. Morris	10,000
Fall ‘03	Race 1	King City	151	Jeff Murphy	James H. Falk, Sr.	Jimmy Day	10,000
	Race 2	Whatsitallabout	150	Robert Walsh	Anne O. Haynes	Bruce Haynes	
	Race 3	Lord Zada	150	Gus Brown	Augustin Stable	Sanna N. Hendriks	
	Race 4	Major Conquest	146	Paddy Young	Mrs. Henry F. Stern	Jack Fisher	10,000
	Race 5	Smart Agenda	160	Christopher Read	Kinross Farm	Neil R. Morris	2,500
	Race 6	Cracker Day (NZ)	150	Rochelle Lockett	Hound's Cry Farm	Thomas J. Kirlin	2,500
	Race 7	Mauritania	158	Calvin McCormack	Whitewood Farm	Richard L. Valentine	10,000
	Race 8	Limerick Lad	140	Tom Foley	F. Bruce Miller	F. Bruce Miller	1,000
Spring ‘03	Race 1	Mauritania	156	Colvin Ryan	Whitewood Farm	Richard L. Valentine	15,000
	Race 2	Thegooddieyoung	150	Robert Walsh	Mrs. Walter M. Jeffords, Jr.	F. Bruce Miller	
	Race 3	Inca Colony	139	Tiffany Mueller	Vicki Fuller	Donald Yovanovich	15,000
	Race 4	Red Panda	160	Christopher Read	Kinross Farm	Neil R. Morris	10,000
	Race 5	Senor Melchor	144	Jody Petty	Augustin Stable	Sanna N. Hendriks	20,000
	Race 6	Upheld (NZ)	156	Matthew McCarron	Green Stripe Stables	Alicia S. Murphy	10,000
