= Cherry Creek, Colorado =

Census-designated place in Arapahoe County, CO, USA

- census-designated place
- Location of the Cherry Creek CDP in Arapahoe County, Colorado
- Coordinates: 39°36′20″N 104°52′22″W
- Country: United States
- State: Colorado
- County: Arapahoe

Government
  - Type: unincorporated community
  - Body: Arapahoe County

Area
  - Total: 1.669 sq mi (4.322 km^{2})
  - Land: 1.669 sq mi (4.322 km^{2})
  - Water: 0 sq mi (0.000 km^{2})
- Elevation: 5,742 ft (1,750 m)

Population (2020)
  - Total: 11,488
  - Density: 6,884/sq mi (2,658/km^{2})
- Time zone: UTC−07:00 (MST)
  - Summer (DST): UTC−06:00 (MDT)
- ZIP code: Engelewood 80111
- Area codes: 303/720/983
- GNIS CDP ID: 2629984
- FIPS code: 08-13590

Cherry Creek is an unincorporated community and a census-designated place (CDP) located in Arapahoe County, Colorado, United States. The CDP is a part of the Denver–Aurora–Centennial, CO Metropolitan Statistical Area. The population of the Cherry Creek CDP was 11,488 at the United States Census 2020. The ZIP code 80111 serves the area.

== Geography ==
At the 2020 United States Census, the Cherry Creek CDP has an area of 1,068 acres (4.322 km^{2}), all land.

== Demographics ==
The United States Census Bureau initially defined the Cherry Creek CDP for the United States Census 2010.

Cherry Creek CDP, Colorado
Year	Pop.	±%
2010	11,120	—
2020	11,488	+3.3%
Source: United States Census Bureau

=== 2020 census ===
As of the 2020 census, Cherry Creek had a population of 11,488. The median age was 40.0 years. 26.4% of residents were under the age of 18 and 14.5% of residents were 65 years of age or older. For every 100 females there were 99.2 males, and for every 100 females age 18 and over there were 97.4 males age 18 and over.

100.0% of residents lived in urban areas, while 0.0% lived in rural areas.

There were 4,033 households in Cherry Creek, of which 40.6% had children under the age of 18 living in them. Of all households, 66.2% were married-couple households, 13.6% were households with a male householder and no spouse or partner present, and 16.5% were households with a female householder and no spouse or partner present. About 18.0% of all households were made up of individuals and 5.4% had someone living alone who was 65 years of age or older.

There were 4,234 housing units, of which 4.7% were vacant. The homeowner vacancy rate was 0.5% and the rental vacancy rate was 10.9%.

Racial composition as of the 2020 census
Race	Number	Percent
White	8,158	71.0%
Black or African American	219	1.9%
American Indian and Alaska Native	80	0.7%
Asian	1,553	13.5%
Native Hawaiian and Other Pacific Islander	9	0.1%
Some other race	380	3.3%
Two or more races	1,089	9.5%
Hispanic or Latino (of any race)	1,064	9.3%

== See also ==
- Front Range Urban Corridor
