= Holly Hills, Colorado =

Census-designated place in Arapahoe County, CO, USA

- Census-designated place
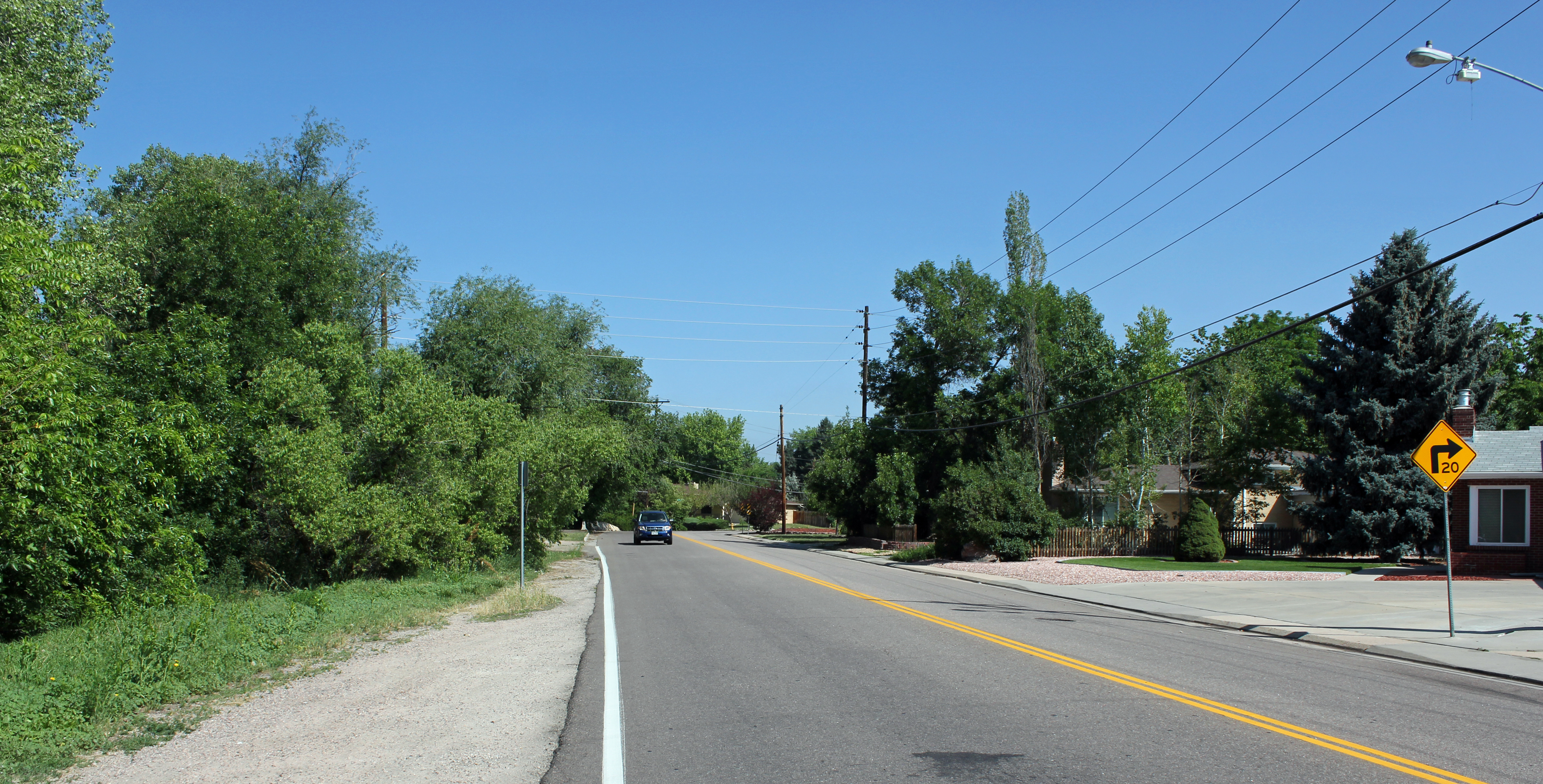
- A view of Holly Hills.

- Location of the Holly Hills CDP in Arapahoe County, Colorado
- Coordinates: 39°40′04″N 104°55′18″W
- Country: United States
- State: Colorado
- County: Arapahoe County

Government
  - Type: unincorporated community

Area
  - Total: 0.580 sq mi (1.503 km^{2})
  - Land: 0.580 sq mi (1.503 km^{2})
  - Water: 0 sq mi (0.000 km^{2})
- Elevation: 5,476 ft (1,669 m)

Population (2020)
  - Total: 2,683
  - Density: 4,623/sq mi (1,785/km^{2})
- Time zone: UTC-7 (MST)
  - Summer (DST): UTC-6 (MDT)
- ZIP Code: Denver 80222
- Area codes: 303 & 720
- GNIS feature ID: 2629989

Holly Hills is an unincorporated community and a census-designated place (CDP) located in and governed by Arapahoe County, Colorado, United States. Holly Hills is an enclave of the City and County of Denver. The CDP is a part of the Denver–Aurora–Lakewood, CO Metropolitan Statistical Area. The population of the Holly Hills CDP was 2,683 at the United States Census 2020. The Denver post office 80222 serves the area.

== Geography ==
The Holly Hills CDP has an area of 371 acres (1.503 km^{2}), all land.

== Demographics ==
The United States Census Bureau initially defined the Holly Hills CDP for the United States Census 2010.

Holly Hills CDP, Colorado
Year	Pop.	±%
2010	2,521	—
2020	2,683	+6.4%
Source: United States Census Bureau

=== 2020 census ===
As of the 2020 census, Holly Hills had a population of 2,683. The median age was 44.3 years. 20.6% of residents were under the age of 18 and 23.1% of residents were 65 years of age or older. For every 100 females there were 97.9 males, and for every 100 females age 18 and over there were 93.3 males age 18 and over.

100.0% of residents lived in urban areas, while 0.0% lived in rural areas.

There were 1,030 households in Holly Hills, of which 32.7% had children under the age of 18 living in them. Of all households, 56.7% were married-couple households, 14.3% were households with a male householder and no spouse or partner present, and 23.6% were households with a female householder and no spouse or partner present. About 22.6% of all households were made up of individuals and 11.3% had someone living alone who was 65 years of age or older.

There were 1,056 housing units, of which 2.5% were vacant. The homeowner vacancy rate was 1.0% and the rental vacancy rate was 7.1%.

Racial composition as of the 2020 census
Race	Number	Percent
White	2,224	82.9%
Black or African American	58	2.2%
American Indian and Alaska Native	8	0.3%
Asian	98	3.7%
Native Hawaiian and Other Pacific Islander	0	0.0%
Some other race	44	1.6%
Two or more races	251	9.4%
Hispanic or Latino (of any race)	221	8.2%

== Education ==
The school district is Cherry Creek School District 5.

Zoned schools are: Holly Ridge Primary School (kindergarten through grade 2), Holly Hills Elementary School (grades 3-5), West Middle School, and Cherry Creek High School.

== See also ==
- Front Range Urban Corridor
