= Aetna Estates, Colorado =

Census-designated place in Arapahoe County, Colorado, United States

- Census-designated place
- Location of the Aetna Estates CDP in Arapahoe County, Colorado
- Coordinates: 39°44′17″N 104°40′24″W
- Country: United States
- State: Colorado
- County: Arapahoe

Government
  - Type: unincorporated community
  - Body: Arapahoe County

Area
  - Total: 0.13 sq mi (0.34 km^{2})
  - Land: 0.13 sq mi (0.34 km^{2})
  - Water: 0 sq mi (0.00 km^{2})
- Elevation: 5,614 ft (1,711 m)

Population (2020)
  - Total: 1,496
  - Density: 11,000/sq mi (4,400/km^{2})
- Time zone: UTC−07:00 (MST)
  - Summer (DST): UTC−06:00 (MDT)
- ZIP Code: 80018
- Area codes: 303/720/983
- GNIS CDP ID: 2583206
- FIPS code: 08-00620

Aetna Estates is an unincorporated community and a census-designated place (CDP) located in Arapahoe County, Colorado, United States. The CDP is a part of the Denver–Aurora–Lakewood, CO Metropolitan Statistical Area. The population of the Aetna Estates CDP was 1,496 at the United States Census 2020. The unincorporated community is surrounded by Aurora and lies in ZIP Code 80018.

== Geography ==
The Aetna Estates CDP has an area of 84 acres (0.339 km^{2}), all land.

== Demographics ==
The United States Census Bureau initially defined the Aetna Estates CDP for the United States Census 2010.

Aetna Estates CDP, Colorado
Year	Pop.	±%
2010	834	—
2020	1,496	+79.4%
Source: United States Census Bureau

=== 2020 census ===
As of the 2020 census, Aetna Estates had a population of 1,496. The median age was 27.6 years. 36.8% of residents were under the age of 18 and 6.6% of residents were 65 years of age or older. For every 100 females there were 103.0 males, and for every 100 females age 18 and over there were 101.3 males age 18 and over.

100.0% of residents lived in urban areas, while 0.0% lived in rural areas.

There were 419 households in Aetna Estates, of which 55.1% had children under the age of 18 living in them. Of all households, 48.4% were married-couple households, 20.3% were households with a male householder and no spouse or partner present, and 22.2% were households with a female householder and no spouse or partner present. About 16.7% of all households were made up of individuals and 7.2% had someone living alone who was 65 years of age or older.

There were 441 housing units, of which 5.0% were vacant. The homeowner vacancy rate was 0.0% and the rental vacancy rate was 0.0%.

Racial composition as of the 2020 census
Race	Number	Percent
White	414	27.7%
Black or African American	30	2.0%
American Indian and Alaska Native	45	3.0%
Asian	1	0.1%
Native Hawaiian and Other Pacific Islander	1	0.1%
Some other race	637	42.6%
Two or more races	368	24.6%
Hispanic or Latino (of any race)	1,147	76.7%

== Education ==
The school district is Adams-Arapahoe School District 28J.

Zoned schools are as follows: Harmony Ridge P-8 School, and Vista PEAK Preparatory School.

== See also ==
- Front Range Urban Corridor
