= Four Square Mile, Colorado =

Census-designated place in Arapahoe County, CO, USA

- Census-designated place
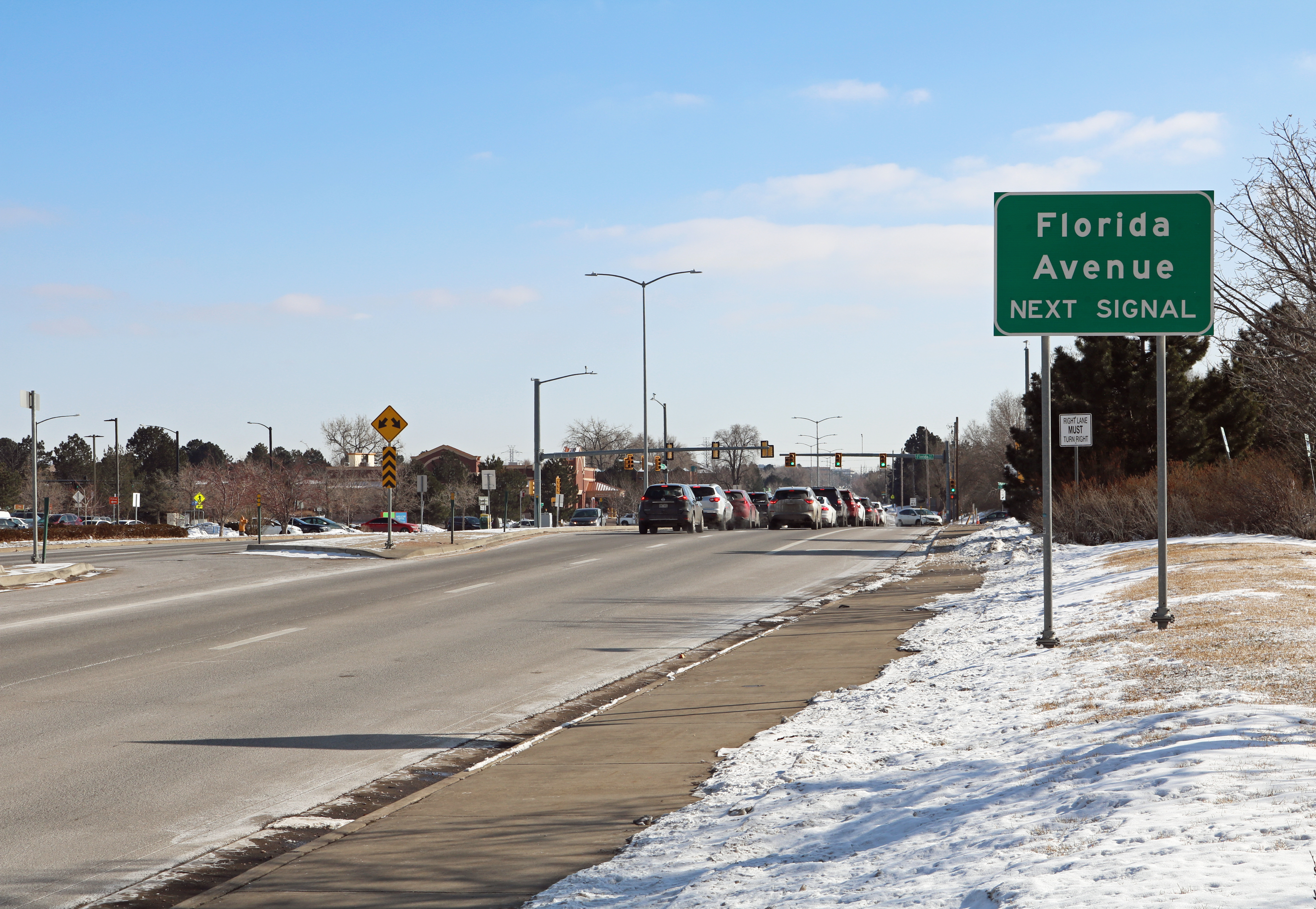
- Looking south along Parker Road in Four Square Mile

- Location of the Four Square Mile CDP in the State of Colorado
- Coordinates: 39°40′46″N 104°52′42″W
- Country: United States
- State: Colorado
- County: Arapahoe County

Government
  - Type: unincorporated community

Area
  - Total: 2.702 sq mi (6.997 km^{2})
  - Land: 2.702 sq mi (6.997 km^{2})
  - Water: 0 sq mi (0.000 km^{2})
- Elevation: 5,440 ft (1,660 m)

Population (2020)
  - Total: 22,872
  - Density: 8,466/sq mi (3,269/km^{2})
- Time zone: UTC-7 (MST)
  - Summer (DST): UTC-6 (MDT)
- Area codes: 303 & 720
- GNIS feature ID: 2804444

Four Square Mile is an unincorporated community and a census-designated place (CDP) located in and governed by Arapahoe County, Colorado, United States. The population was 22,872 at the 2020 census. The CDP is a part of the Denver–Aurora–Lakewood, CO Metropolitan Statistical Area. The CDP is surrounded by Denver on the north, west, and south and by Aurora on the east. The name is derived from the four square miles bounded by Quebec Street, Mississippi Avenue, Havana Street and Yale Avenue. Annexation of the Arapahoe County enclave was contested between Denver and Aurora in the early 1970s, with Denver annexing east from Quebec Street and Aurora west from Havana Street. Denver’s annexations were ultimately stopped by the Poundstone Amendment; Aurora is not similarly limited but made its most recent annexation to Dayton Street in 1984, leaving nearly three of the four square miles unincorporated. The Four Square Mile CDP includes Sullivan, a previous unincorporated community designation. The area lies in ZIP codes 80231 and 80247.

== Geography ==
The Four Square Mile CDP has an area of 1,729 acres (6.997 km^{2}), all land.

== Demographics ==
The United States Census Bureau defined the Four Square Mile CDP for the United States Census 2020.

Four Square Mile CDP, Colorado
Year	Pop.	±%
2020	22,872	—
Source: United States Census Bureau

=== 2020 census ===
As of the 2020 census, Four Square Mile had a population of 22,872. The median age was 32.5 years. 22.0% of residents were under the age of 18 and 9.4% of residents were 65 years of age or older. For every 100 females there were 97.8 males, and for every 100 females age 18 and over there were 96.6 males age 18 and over.

100.0% of residents lived in urban areas, while 0.0% lived in rural areas.

There were 10,073 households in Four Square Mile, of which 27.0% had children under the age of 18 living in them. Of all households, 30.1% were married-couple households, 26.7% were households with a male householder and no spouse or partner present, and 32.7% were households with a female householder and no spouse or partner present. About 35.0% of all households were made up of individuals and 7.5% had someone living alone who was 65 years of age or older.

There were 10,803 housing units, of which 6.8% were vacant. The homeowner vacancy rate was 0.5% and the rental vacancy rate was 7.4%.

Racial composition as of the 2020 census
Race	Number	Percent
White	11,176	48.9%
Black or African American	5,374	23.5%
American Indian and Alaska Native	246	1.1%
Asian	1,407	6.2%
Native Hawaiian and Other Pacific Islander	36	0.2%
Some other race	1,984	8.7%
Two or more races	2,649	11.6%
Hispanic or Latino (of any race)	4,461	19.5%

== Education ==
Four Square Mile is included in the Cherry Creek School District. Students attend Overland High School and Prairie Middle School. Most children attend Eastridge Elementary School, while some are assigned to Ponderosa, Holly Hills, or Holly Ridge Elementary School.

== See also ==
- Front Range Urban Corridor
