= Foxfield, Colorado =

Town in Colorado, United States

- Statutory Town
- Town of Foxfield
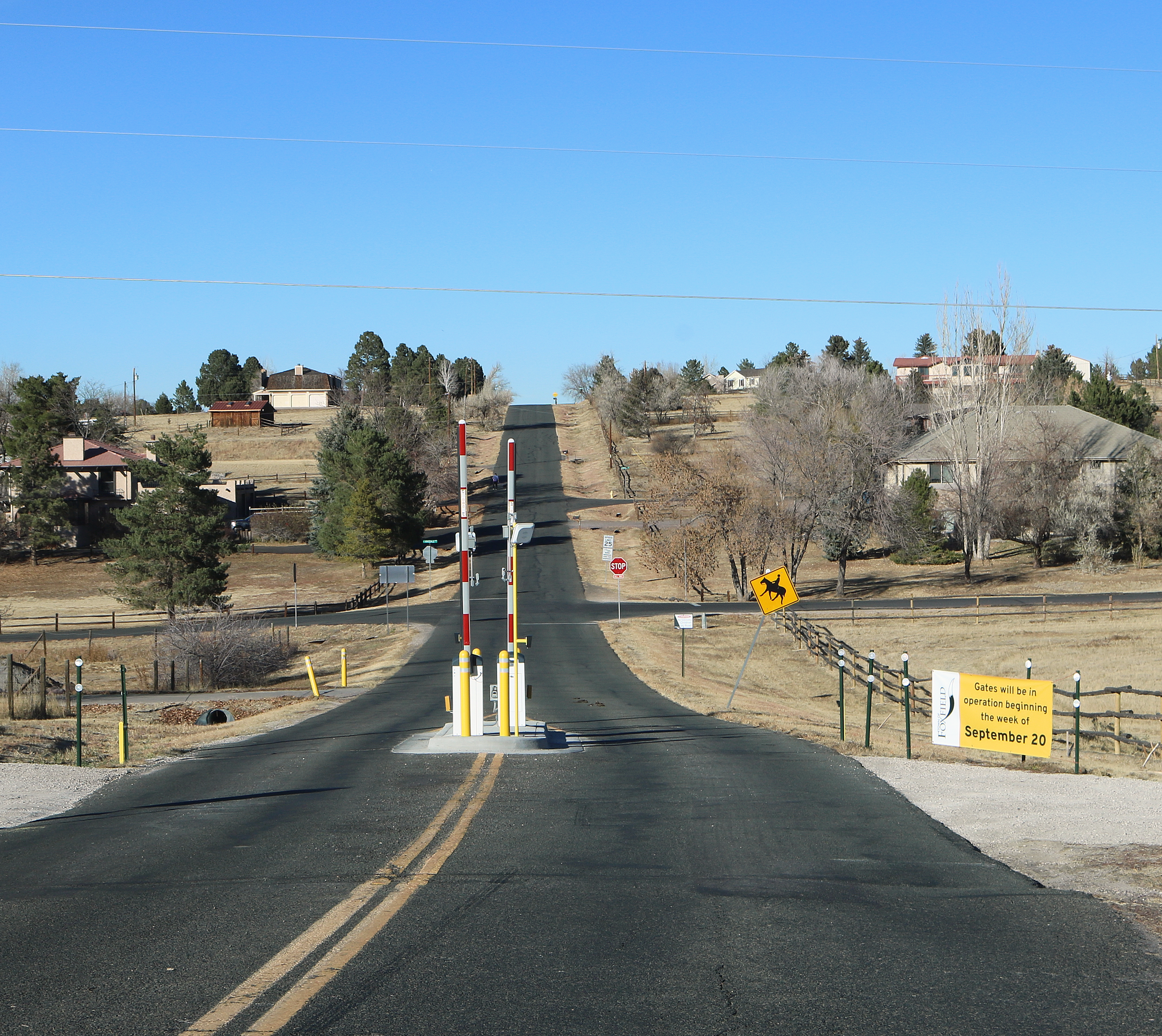
- Looking north along South Richfield Street in Foxfield

- Location of the Town of Foxfield in Arapahoe County, Colorado
- Coordinates: 39°35′17″N 104°47′09″W
- Country: United States
- State: Colorado
- County: Arapahoe County
- Incorporated: December 15, 1994

Government
  - Type: Statutory Town

Area
  - Total: 1.323 sq mi (3.427 km^{2})
  - Land: 1.323 sq mi (3.427 km^{2})
  - Water: 0 sq mi (0.000 km^{2})
- Elevation: 5,807 ft (1,770 m)

Population (2020)
  - Total: 754
  - Density: 570/sq mi (220/km^{2})
- Time zone: UTC−07:00 (MST)
  - Summer (DST): UTC−06:00 (MDT)
- ZIP code: 80016
- Area codes: Both 303 and 720
- FIPS code: 08-28105
- GNIS feature ID: 2412649
- Website: townoffoxfield.colorado.gov

The Town of Foxfield is a statutory town located in Arapahoe County, Colorado, United States. The town population was 754 at the 2020 United States census. Foxfield is a part of the Denver-Aurora-Centennial, CO Metropolitan Statistical Area and the Front Range Urban Corridor. The town is bordered by the cities of Aurora and Centennial.

== Geography ==
At the 2020 United States census, the town had a total area of 847 acres (3.427 km^{2}), all of it land.

== Demographics ==
Historical population
Census	Pop.	Note	%±
2000	746		—
2010	685		−8.2%
2020	754		10.1%
U.S. Decennial Census

As of the census of 2000, there were 746 people, 247 households, and 218 families residing in the town. The population density was 577.7 inhabitants per square mile (223.1/km^{2}). There were 252 housing units at an average density of 195.1 units per square mile (75.3 units/km^{2}). The racial makeup of the town was 93.70% White, 2.68% African American, 1.34% Asian, and 2.28% from two or more races. Hispanic or Latino of any race were 2.82% of the population.

There were 247 households, out of which 38.9% had children under the age of 18 living with them, 84.2% were married couples living together, 2.8% had a female householder with no husband present, and 11.7% were non-families. 8.5% of all households were made up of individuals, and 2.8% had someone living alone who was 65 years of age or older. The average household size was 2.98 and the average family size was 3.15.

In the town, the population was spread out, with 28.2% under the age of 18, 5.4% from 18 to 24, 17.7% from 25 to 44, 39.0% from 45 to 64, and 9.8% who were 65 years of age or older. The median age was 44 years. For every 100 females, there were 106.6 males. For every 100 females age 18 and over, there were 101.5 males.

The median income for a household in the town was $109,507, and the median income for a family was $117,255. Males had a median income of $66,750 versus $46,250 for females. The per capita income for the town was $40,970. About 2.7% of families and 4.4% of the population were below the poverty line, including 4.2% of those under age 18 and 7.8% of those age 65 or over.

== Education ==
Foxfield is in Cherry Creek School District 5.

School zones are as follows: Creekside Elementary School, Liberty Middle School, and Grandview High School.

== See also ==
- Front Range Urban Corridor
