= Fairmount Cemetery (Denver) =

Cemetery in Denver, Colorado

Coordinates: 39°42′23″N 104°53′51″W

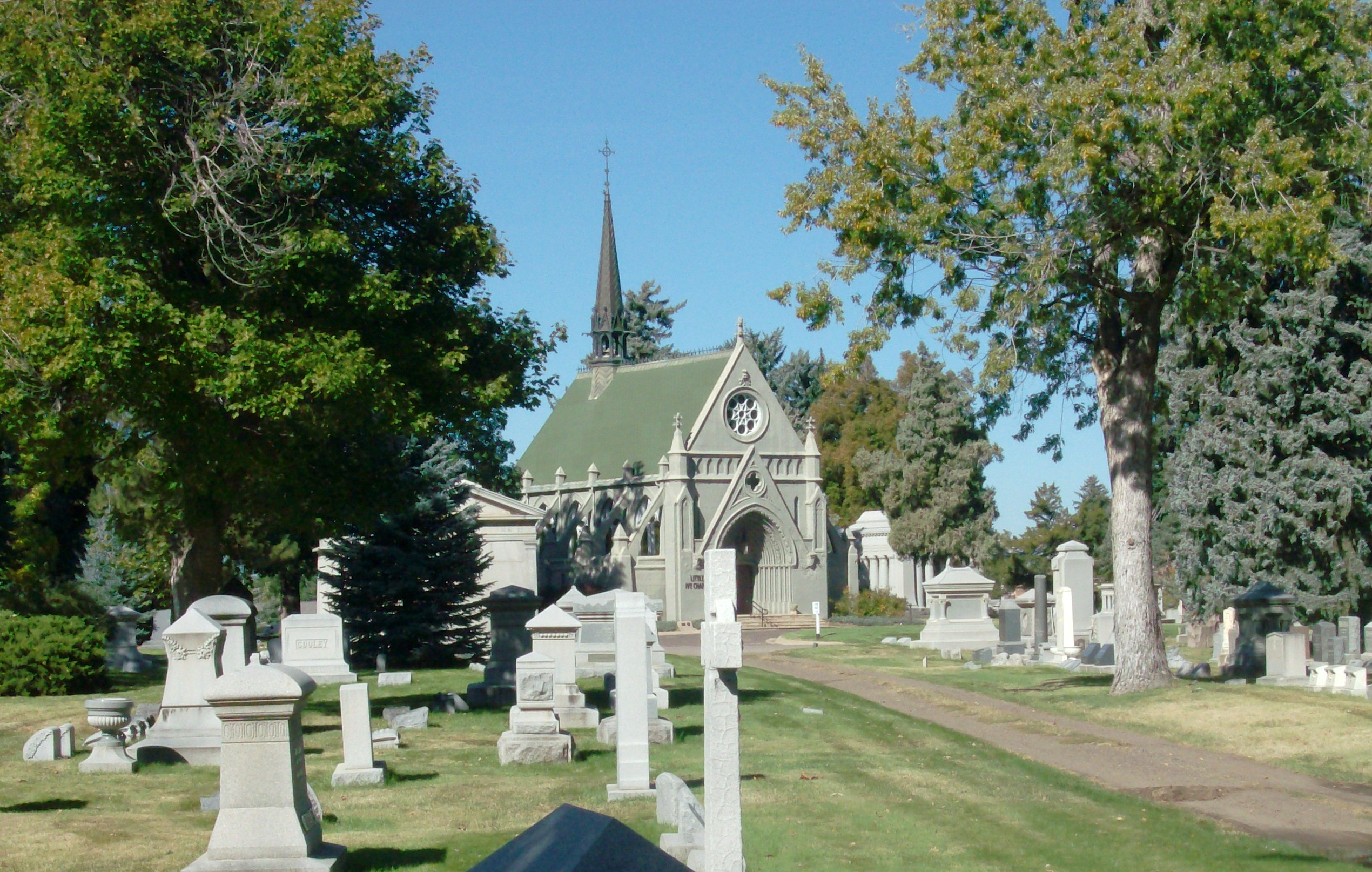
- A view of Fairmount Cemetery with the Little Ivy Chapel in the background.
- Interactive map of Fairmount Cemetery

Details
- Established: 1890
- Location: 430 S Quebec St, Denver, Colorado
- Country: United States
- Type: Non denominational
- Size: 280 acres (110 ha)
- Website: Fairmount Cemetery
- Find a Grave: Fairmount Cemetery
- The Political Graveyard: Fairmount Cemetery

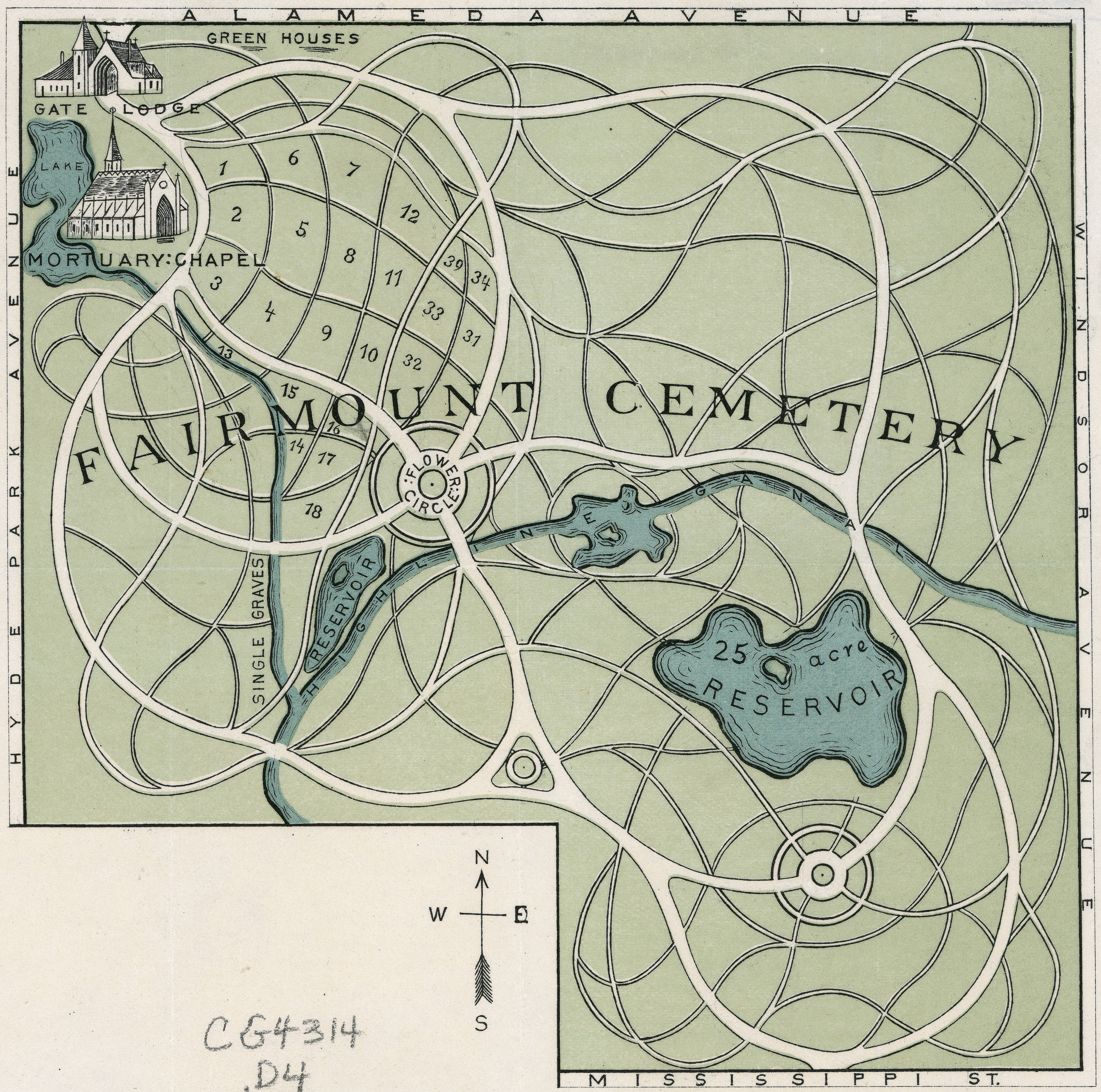
Map, Shows roads, some block numbers, bodies of water, mortuary, gate lodge and green houses. The southern and eastern borders of the cemetery are now somewhat contracted compared to the original borders shown here.

Fairmount Cemetery in Denver, Colorado, was founded in 1890 and is Denver's second oldest operating cemetery after Riverside Cemetery. It is located in land south-east of the intersection of the major Denver roadways Alameda Ave. and Quebec St. (originally called Hyde Park Avenue). The cemetery was designed by German landscape architect Reinhard Schuetze. The cemetery was patterned after Mount Auburn Cemetery in Cambridge and Watertown, Massachusetts. The cemetery occupies 280 acres (110 ha). The first year the cemetery opened over 4500 trees and shrubs were planted by Schuetze. The cemetery is the largest arboretum in the state.

The cemetery contains many fine monuments, including works by Robert Garrison, John Paulding, Arnold Ronnebeck, Pompeo Coppini and others.

The cemetery also contains three structures which have been designated as official historic landmarks by the City of Denver: the Little Ivy Chapel, the Gate Lodge, and the Fairmount Mausoleum. The Little Ivy Chapel and the Gate Lodge were both constructed in 1890, the year the cemetery opened, and were designed by architect Henry Ten Eyck Wendell. The Fairmount Mausoleum, constructed in 1929 and opened in 1930, was designed by architects Frederick E. Mountjoy and Francis W. Frewan.

== Notable burials ==
- Gordon Llewellyn Allott (1907–1989), US Senator
- Elias Milton Ammons (1860–1925), Colorado Governor
- Teller Ammons (1895–1972), Colorado Governor
- Priscilla Baird (1828–1904), founder of Baird College
- William J. Barker (1831-1900), Denver Mayor

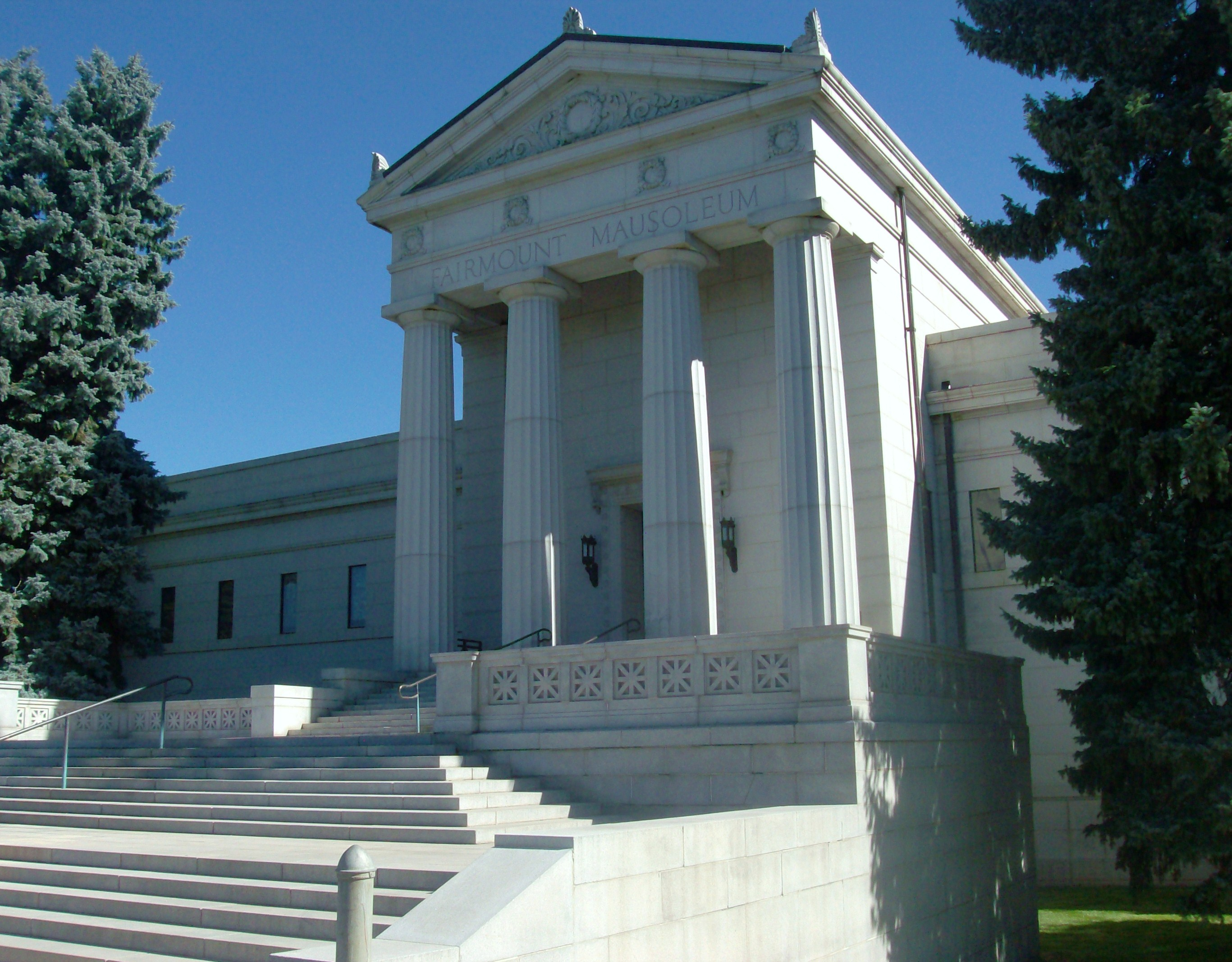
The main entrance to the Fairmount Mausoleum

- Lou Blonger (1849–1924), Saloonkeeper, gambling house owner and kingpin of Denver underworld
- Charles Boettcher (1852–1948), Businessman, philanthropist
- Frederick Gilmer Bonfils (1860–1933), co-founder of the Denver Post
- Nona L. Brooks (1861–1945), leader in the New Thought movement and a founder of the Church of Divine Science.
- William C. Bryan (1852–1933), Indian Wars Medal of Honor Recipient
- Henry Augustus Buchtel (1847–1924), Colorado Governor
- Temple Hoyne Buell (1895–1990), Architect
- William Evans Burney (1893–1969), US Representative from Colorado
- William Newton Byers (1831–1903), founder and editor of the Rocky Mountain News in Denver, Colorado
- Lewis Cass Carpenter (1836–1908), US Representative from South Carolina

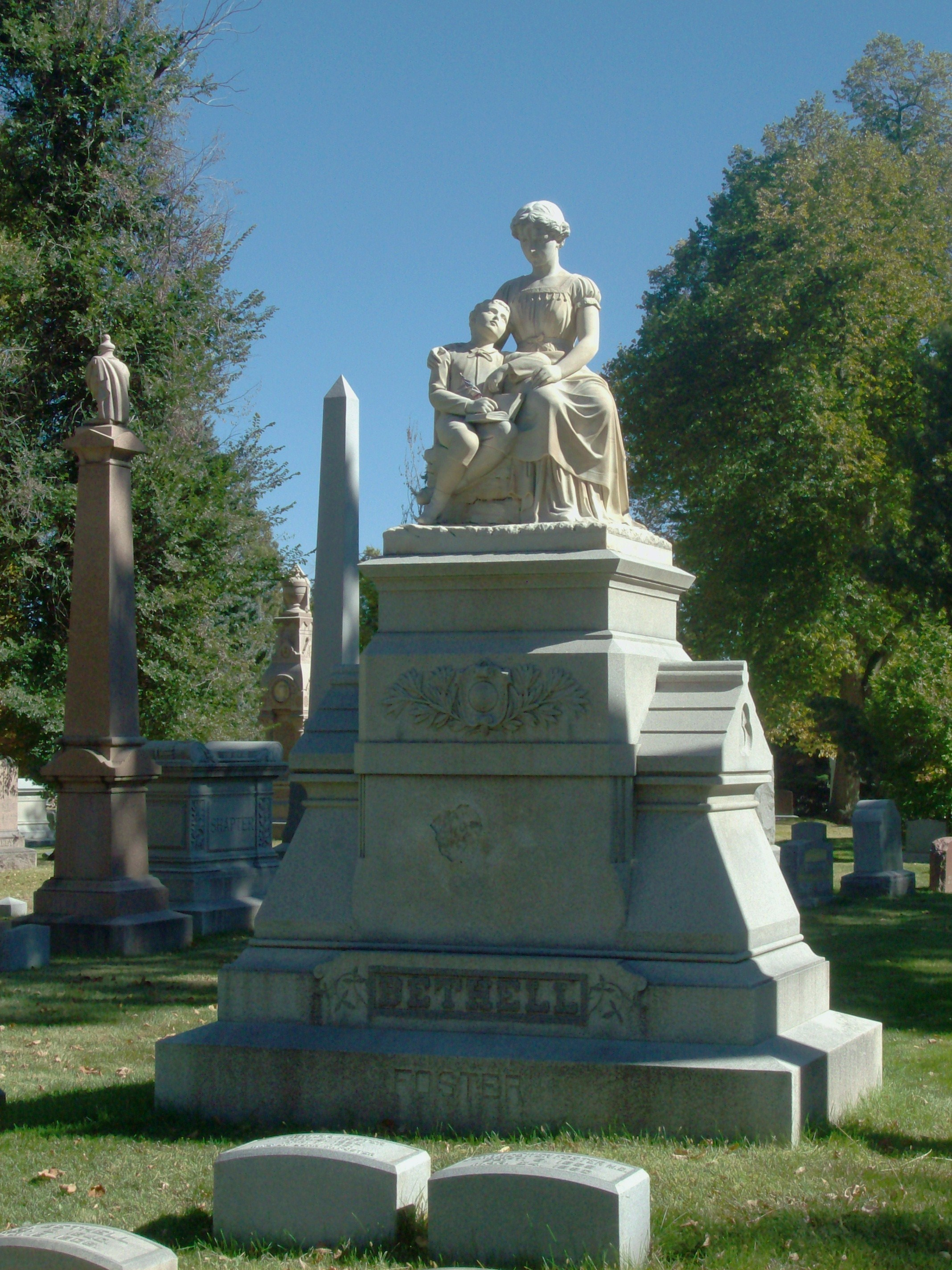
The Bethell-Foster monument

- Ralph Lawrence Carr (1887–1950), Colorado Governor
- John Milton Chivington (1821–1894), Methodist pastor and Union Army colonel, responsible for Sand Creek massacre
- George Washington Cook (1851–1916), US Representative from Colorado
- Job Adams Cooper (1843–1899), Colorado Governor
- Edward Prentiss Costigan (1874–1939), US Senator
- Peter Hoyt Dominick (1915–1981), US Representative from Colorado, US Senator
- Stephen Wallace Dorsey (1842–1916), US Senator from Arkansas
- Major Jacob Downing (1830–1907), Lawyer, Civil War Officer
- William Robb Eaton (1877–1942), US Representative from Colorado
- Frank Edbrooke (1840–1921), leading architect in Denver
- John Elitch (1851–1891), founder of Elitch Gardens
- Mary Elitch Long (1856–1936), co founder of Elitch Gardens
- Justina Ford (1871–1952), medical pioneer
- Dean Milton Gillespie (1884–1949), US Congressman
- Frank Graham (1914–1950), announcer and voice actor – unmarked
- James Benton Grant (1848–1911), Colorado Governor

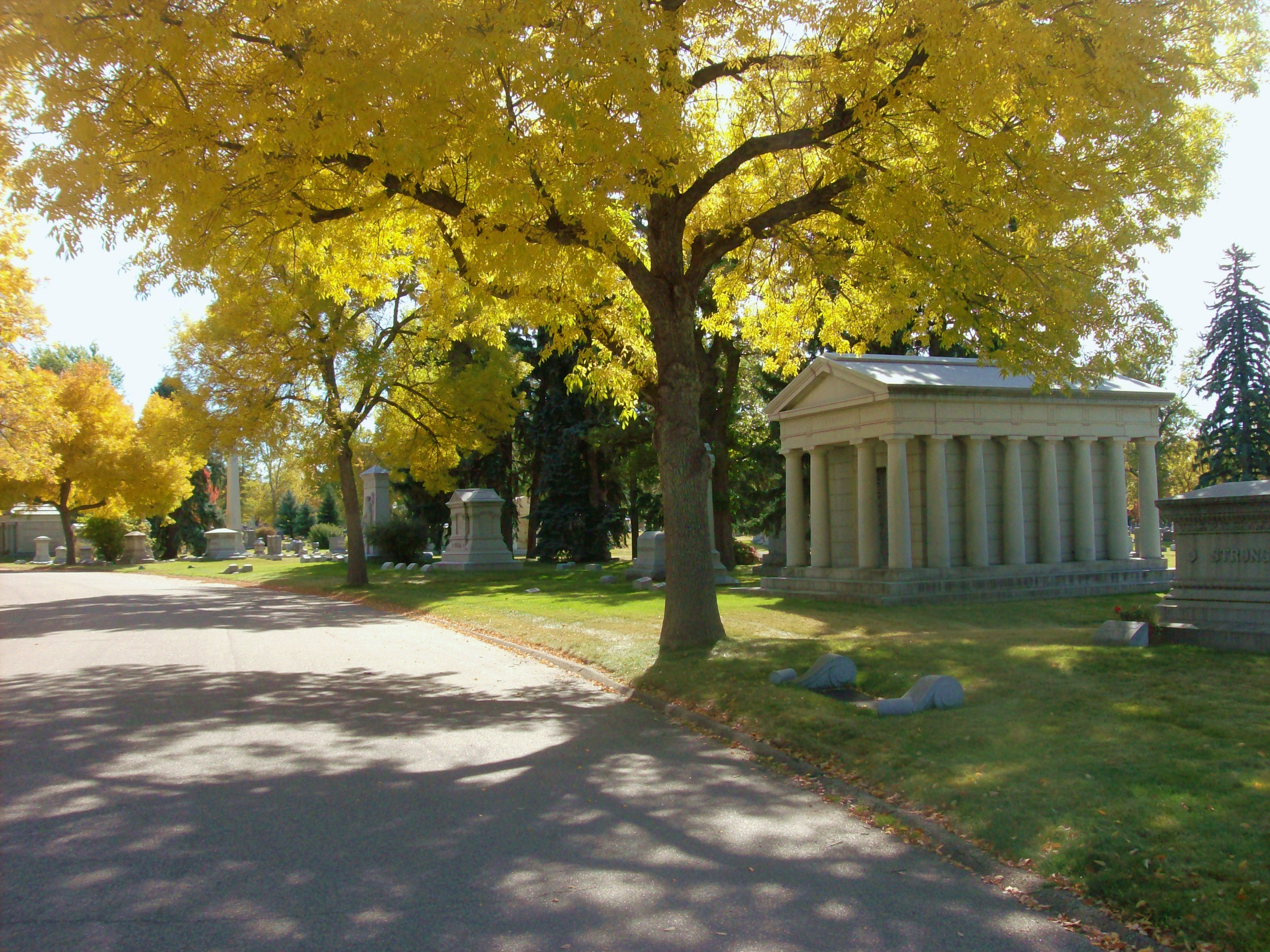
Autumn in Fairmount Cemetery

- Emily Griffith (1860–1947), founder of Emily Griffith Opportunity School
- LH Guldman (1852-1936), pioneer merchant and philanthropist
- Julius Caldeen Gunter (1858–1940), Colorado Governor
- Frank Leslie Hagaman (1894–1966), Kansas Governor
- Warren Armstrong Haggott (1864–1958), US Representative from Colorado
- Irving Hale (1861–1930), founder of Veterans of Foreign Wars
- Moses Hallett (1834–1913), Chief Justice, US District Judge
- Samuel Hartsel (1834–1918), Colorado ranching pioneer
- Nathaniel Peter Hill (1832–1900), US Senator
- Louise Sneed Hill (1862–1955) wife of Crawford Hill, head of the famous Denver society set called the Sacred 36
- Herbert Alonzo Howe (1858–1926), American astronomer, educator, author, Dean of Denver University
- Robert Lee Howsam (1918–2008), co-founder of the Denver Broncos
- Charles James Hughes Jr. (1853–1911), US Senator
- John Wesley Iliff (1831–1878), prominent cattle rancher
- Byron L. Johnson (1917–2000), US Representative from Colorado
- Edwin Carl 'Big Ed' Johnson (1884–1970), Colorado Governor, US Senator
- Harold Irving Johnston (1892–1949), World War I Medal of Honor Recipient

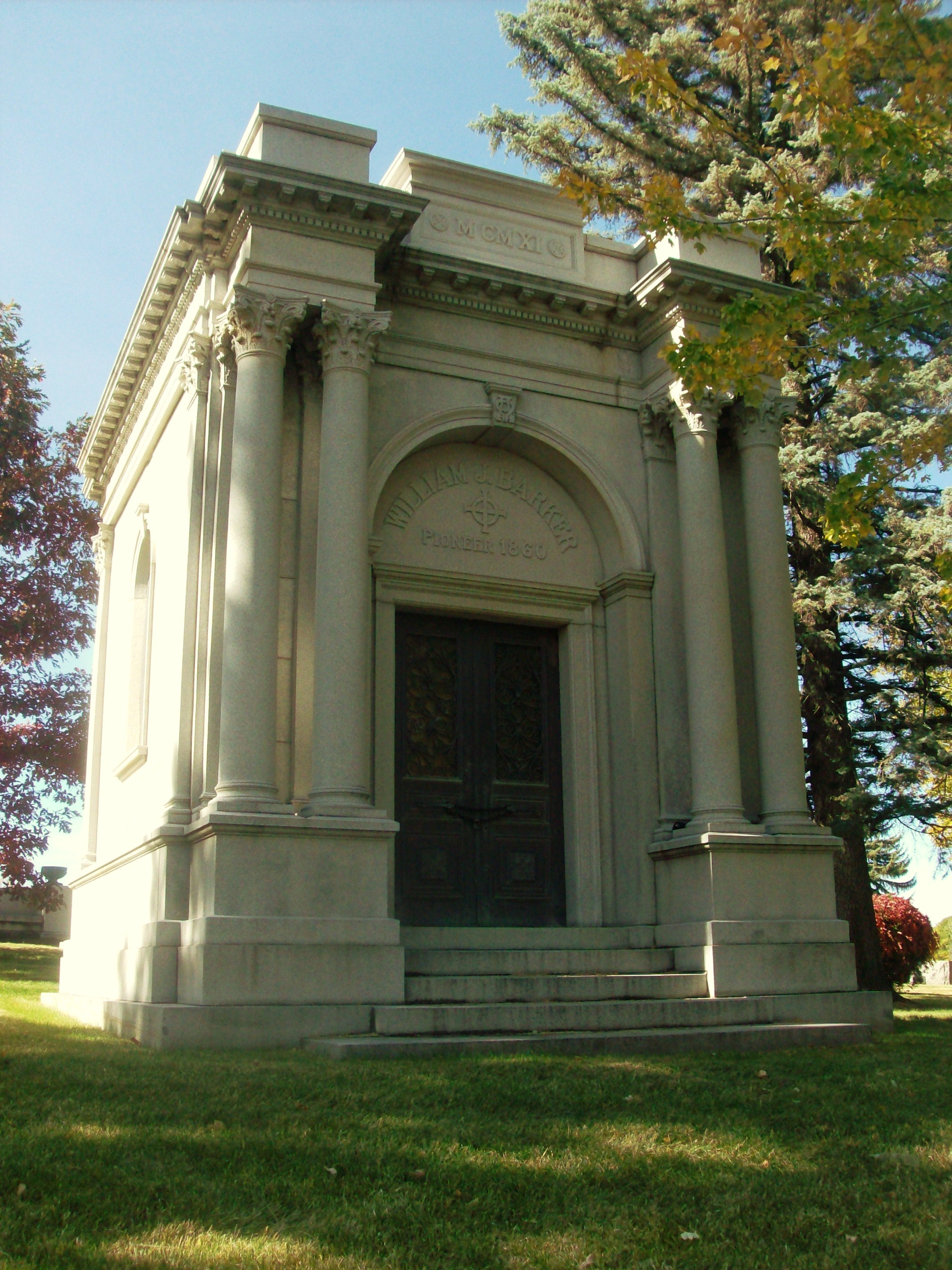
The William J. Barker mausoleum

- George John Kindel (1855–1930), US Representative from Colorado
- William Lee Knous (1889–1959), Colorado Governor
- Arlene White Lawrence (1916–1990), Bishop and the third President and General Superintendent of the Pillar of Fire Church
- Eva Frederica French LeFevre (1851–1948), original founder of the Charity Organization Society, one of the first charity movements in the country
- Wolfe Londoner (1842–1912), Denver Mayor
- William Austin Hamilton Loveland (1826–1894), railroad entrepreneur and businessman
- Lieut. Francis Brown Lowry (1894–1918), 91st Aero Squadron pilot killed in World War I, Lowry Field was named in honor of him
- Rice William Means (1877–1949), US Senator
- Donald Meek (1878–1946), popular character actor
- Eugene Donald Millikin (1891–1958), US Senator
- David Halliday Moffat (1839–1911), financier and industrialist
- Ostis Otto Moore (1896–1990), Judge and Chief Justice of the Colorado Supreme Court, Assistant District Attorney for Denver District Attorney's Office
- Clarence J. Morley (1869–1948), Colorado Governor
- Samuel Danford Nicholson (1859–1923), US Senator
- Jackson Orr (1832–1926), US Representative from Colorado
- Thomas MacDonald Patterson (1839–1916), US Representative from Colorado, US Senator
- Lawrence Cowle Phipps (1862–1958), US Senator
- Frederick Pitkin (1837–1886), Colorado Governor
- James H. Platt Jr. (1837–1894), US Representative from Colorado
- Hugh H. Price (1859–1904), US Representative from Colorado

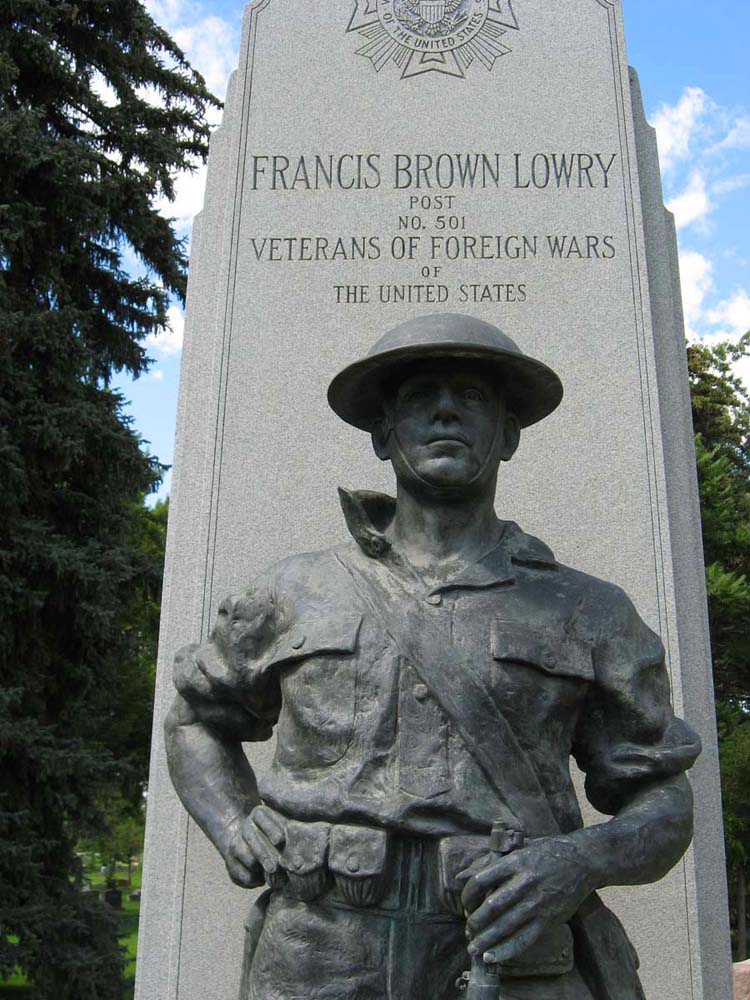
Francis Brown Lowry monument by John Paulding

- William MacLeod Raine (1871–1954), Western Author
- Robert Sawers Roeschlaub (1843–1923), architect
- Joe Rogers (1964–2013), former Lieutenant Governor of Colorado
- Florence Rena Sabin (1871–1953), American medical scientist
- Karl Cortlandt Schuyler (1877–1933), US Senator
- John Franklin Shafroth (1854–1922), US Representative from Colorado, Colorado Governor, US Senator
- Isaiah Shoels (1980–1999), victim of the Columbine High School massacre
- Jesse Shwayder (1882–1970), Founder of Samsonite Corporation
- Mattie Silks (1846–1929), Famous madam
- Eben Smith (1832–1906), prominent bank, mine and railroad owner.
- Paul Sonnenberg (1848–1909), Vaudeville entertainer known as Paul Stanley
- Anna Speas (1869–1898), Park County woman whose tragic life was examined Historic Tales from Park County: Parked in the Past (unmarked grave)
- Robert W. Speer (1855–1918), Denver Mayor
- Edward G. Stoiber (1854–1906), mining engineer and owner of the Silver Lakes Mines
- George Gifford Symes (1840–1893), US Representative from Colorado
- Henry Moore Teller (1830–1914), US Senator, Secretary of the Interior between 1882 and 1885.
- Charles Spalding Thomas (1849–1934), Colorado Governor, US Senator
- James H. Turpin (1846–1893), Indian Wars Medal of Honor Recipient
- William Newell Vaile (1876–1927), US Representative from Colorado
- Jasper D. Ward (1829–1902), US Representative from Colorado
- Orlando Ward (1891–1972), US Army Major General
- Henry White Warren (1831–1912), Bishop of Methodist Episcopal Church
- Thomas James Waters (1843–1898), International architect
- Chuck E. Weiss (1945–2021), American songwriter and vocalist and the inspiration for the song Chuck E.'s in Love
- Ray Bridwell White (1892–1946), of the Pillar of Fire Church
- Two British Commonwealth war graves, of a Canadian Army officer of World War I and a Royal Artillery soldier of World War II.
- Hungate family (1864), a family of four killed by Native Americans which was a factor in the Sand Creek massacre.
