= Science Hill School =

Science Hill School may refer to:

- Science Hill School (Shelbyville, Kentucky), listed on the National Register of Historic Places in Shelby County, Kentucky
- Science Hill School (Alliance, Ohio), listed on the National Register of Historic Places in Stark County, Ohio
