= Science Hill (disambiguation) =

Science Hill may refer to:

== Places ==
- Science Hill, an area of the Yale University campus
- Science Hill, Kentucky
- Science Hill, Ontario

== Schools ==
- Science Hill High School in Johnson City, Tennessee
- Science Hill School (Shelbyville, Kentucky), listed on the National Register of Historic Places in Shelby County, Kentucky
- Science Hill School (Alliance, Ohio), listed on the National Register of Historic Places in Stark County, Ohio
