= Elizabeth Litchfield Cunnyngham =

American missionary and church worker (1831–1911)

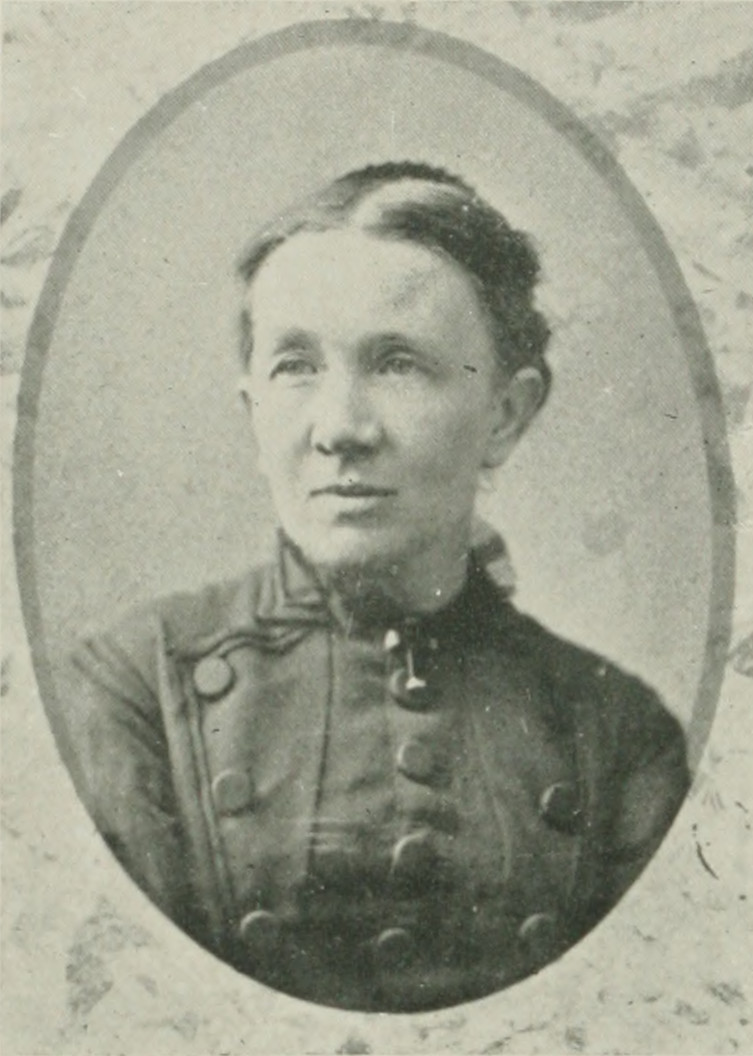
"A Woman of the Century"

Elizabeth Litchfield Cunnyngham (February 23, 1831 – June 27, 1911) was an American missionary and church worker of the long nineteenth century. For 30 years, she served as president of the Woman's Foreign Missionary Society of the Methodist Episcopal Church, South, in Nashville, Tennessee. She was also editor of leaflets and a Sunday school teacher. While in China, having learned the Chinese language, she also translated tracts and small books into the local dialect.

== Early life and education ==
Elizabeth King H. Litchfield (nickname "Betty" or "Bettie") was born in Abingdon, Virginia, February 23, 1831. Her parents, George Victor Litchfield (1796–1875) and Rachael Davis (Mitchell) Litchfield (1804–1874), were of old Virginia stock. Betty had eight siblings: Mary, Connally, Rachel, Abram, George, Almina, Susan, and Rose.

Cunnyngham received the best elementary training which the country could afford, and, when sufficiently advanced, was placed in Science Hill Academy (now Science Hill School, in Shelbyville, Kentucky, which was under the directorship of Julia A. Tevis . While at that school, she was converted and became an earnest and active Christian.

== Career ==
After her return to Virginia, she taught school, not from necessity, but of choice, her father being financially well off. She felt it to be her duty to engage in some useful occupation, and she saw no position more promising than that of a teacher.

On March 23, 1851, in Washington, Virginia, she married Rev. William George Etter Cunnyngham (1820–1900), a minister of the Methodist Episcopal Church, South. In 1852, they sailed from New York City for Shanghai, China, as missionaries to the Chinese. She remained in the mission field nine years, when the failure of her health compelled her to return to the U.S. During her stay in China, she studied diligently, and with uncommon success, the Chinese language. She superintended mission schools, instructed Chinese women and children orally, and translated into the local dialect tracts and small books, some of which remained in use for decades.

After the couple returned to the U.S., they lived in Virginia. Mrs. Cunnyngham labored as far as she had opportunity in the home mission work, doing all she could to awaken deeper interest people in the cause of foreign missions. When the Woman's Board of Foreign Missions of the Methodist Episcopal Church, South, was organized, Cunnyngham was made one of the managers. She was elected editor of leaflets by the board, and for six years, discharged the duties of that office. In addition to her labors in the missionary cause, she was an active Sunday school teacher for 27 years, an efficient helper in local church work, and philanthropic to the poor. She traveled much. Her husband having been elected to one of the editorial chairs of the Methodist Episcopal Church, South, she removed to Nashville, in 1875.

== Personal life ==
The couple had two children, Virginia (1857–1937) and Victor (1861–1921).

Elizabeth Litchfield Cunnyngham had been ill for ten days with angina pectoris before she died on June 27, 1911, in Nasvhille. Burial was at that city's Mount Olivet Cemetery. Some of her correspondence is held with the Litchfield Family Papers at the Virginia Museum of History & Culture.
