= 1936 United States Senate election in Colorado =

- November 3, 1936
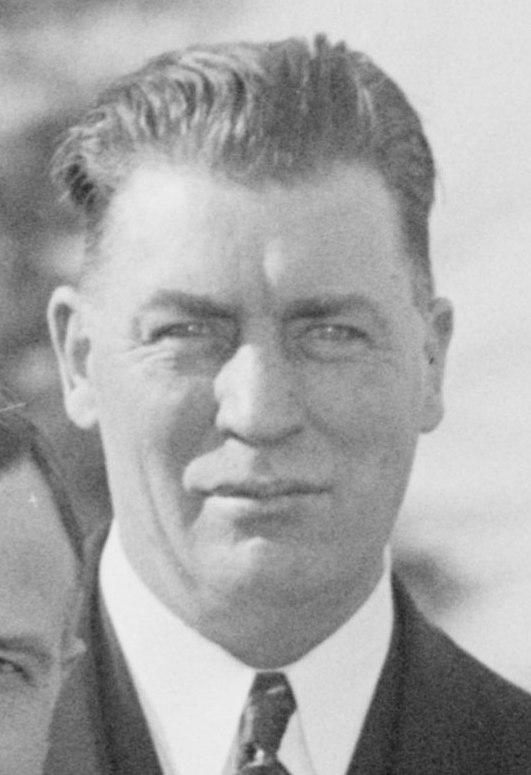

Nominee	Ed Johnson	Ray Sauter
Party	Democratic	Republican
Popular vote	299,376	166,308
Percentage	63.45%	35.25%
- County results Johnson: 50–60% 60–70% 70–80% Sauter: 50–60%
U.S. senator before election
Edward P. Costigan
Democratic
Elected U.S. Senator
Edwin C. Johnson
Democratic

The 1936 United States Senate election in Colorado took place on November 3, 1936. Incumbent Democratic Senator Edward P. Costigan did not seek a second term in office. Democratic Governor Ed Johnson won the open race to succeed him over Raymond L. Sauter.

Primary elections were held September 8. Johnson defeated former Governor William E. Sweet for the Democratic nomination. Sauter was unopposed for the Republican nomination.

== Democratic primary ==
=== Candidates ===
- Edwin C. Johnson, Governor of Colorado
- William E. Sweet, former Governor of Colorado (1923–1925) and candidate for Senate in 1926

=== Results ===
1936 Democratic U.S. Senate primary
Party	Candidate	Votes	%
Democratic	Edwin C. Johnson (incumbent)	94,922	68.00%
Democratic	William E. Sweet	44,672	32.00%
Total votes		139,594	100.00%

== Republican primary ==
=== Candidates ===
- Raymond L. Sauter

==== Declined ====
- Larry Phipps, son of former U.S. Senator Lawrence C. Phipps

=== Results ===
Sauter was unopposed for the Republican nomination.

1936 Republican U.S. Senate primary
Party	Candidate	Votes	%
Republican	Raymond L. Sauter	71,875	100.00%
Total votes		71,875	100.00%

== General election ==
=== Candidates ===
- George W. Carleton (National Union for Social Justice)
- Edwin C. Johnson, Governor of Colorado (Democratic)
- Ray Sauter (Republican)
- Carle Whitehead, perennial candidate (Socialist)

=== Results ===
General election results
Party	Candidate	Votes	%	±%
Democratic	Edwin C. Johnson	299,376	63.45%	▲7.60
Republican	Raymond L. Sauter	166,308	35.25%	▼7.40
Socialist	Carle Whitehead	4,438	0.94%	▲0.40
Union	James Allander	1,705	0.36%	N/A
Total votes		471,827	100.00%	

== See also ==
- 1936 United States Senate elections
