= 1926 United States Senate election in Colorado =

- November 2, 1926
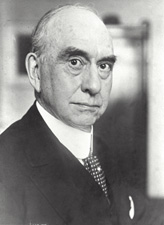

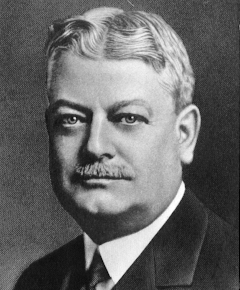
Nominee	Charles W. Waterman	William Ellery Sweet
Party	Republican	Democratic
Popular vote	149,585	138,113
Percentage	50.25%	46.39%
- County results Waterman: 40–50% 50–60% 60–70% Sweet: 40–50% 50–60% 60–70%
U.S. senator before election
Rice W. Means
Republican
Elected U.S. Senator
Charles W. Waterman
Republican

The 1926 United States Senate election in Colorado took place on November 2, 1926. Incumbent Republican Senator Rice W. Means ran for re-election, but he was defeated in the Republican primary by Charles W. Waterman, a prominent attorney and party leader. In the general election, Waterman faced former Governor William Ellery Sweet, the Democratic nominee. Despite the nationwide Democratic trend, as well as the landslide victory for Democrats in the gubernatorial election, Waterman ended up defeating Sweet by a thin margin. Waterman would not end up serving a full term in the Senate, and died in office on August 27, 1932.

== Democratic primary ==
=== Candidates ===
- William Ellery Sweet, former Governor of Colorado
- Paul P. Prosser, Denver attorney, former Howard County, Missouri, Prosecuting Attorney
- Frank J. Hayes, former President of the United Mine Workers

==== Dropped out ====
- Harry L. Lubers, former Speaker of the Colorado House of Representatives

==== Defeated at convention ====
- H. C. Fink, Montrose attorney

=== Campaign ===
At the Democratic convention, a crowded slate of candidates was slightly winnowed down. Paul P. Prosser, a prominent Denver attorney who had previously been elected as the Howard County, Missouri, Prosecuting Attorney, placed first with 569 1/2 votes. He was followed by former Governor William Ellery Sweet with 279 1/2, former State House Speaker Harry L. Lubers with 133, and former labor leader Frank J. Hayes with 121. Attorney H. C. Fink received only 18 votes and was eliminated. Shortly after the convention, Lubers dropped out, concluding that he lacked the financial resources to compete in the primary. Sweet ended up defeating Prosser and Hayes by a decisive margin, though he fell just short of winning a majority.

=== Results ===
Democratic primary results
Party	Candidate	Votes	%
Democratic	William E. Sweet	26,491	49.27
Democratic	Paul P. Prosser	19,583	36.42
Democratic	Frank J. Hayes	7,689	14.30
Total votes		53,763	100.00

== Republican primary ==
=== Candidates ===
- Charles W. Waterman, attorney, 1924 Republican candidate for the U.S. Senate
- Rice W. Means, incumbent U.S. Senator
- George A. Luxford, Denver County Court Judge
- Mortimer W. Spaulding, Denver attorney

=== Results ===
Republican primary results
Party	Candidate	Votes	%
Republican	Charles W. Waterman	57,537	49.82
Republican	Rice W. Means (inc.)	41,721	36.12
Republican	George A. Luxford	14,330	12.41
Republican	Mortimer W. Spaulding	1,906	1.65
Total votes		115,494	100.00

== General election ==
=== Results ===
1926 United States Senate election in Colorado
Party	Candidate	Votes	%	±%
Republican	Charles W. Waterman	149,585	50.25%	+0.08%
Democratic	William Ellery Sweet	138,113	46.39%	+2.72%
Farmer–Labor	Morton Alexander	5,829	1.96%	−3.56%
Socialist	Frank H. Rice	2,218	0.75%	+0.11%
People's Constitutional Rights	James A. Ownbey	1,091	0.37%	—
Communist	James A. Ayres	859	0.29%	—
Majority		11,472	3.85%	−2.64%
Turnout		297,695		
Republican hold				
