= William Ellery Sweet =

American politician

William E. Sweet
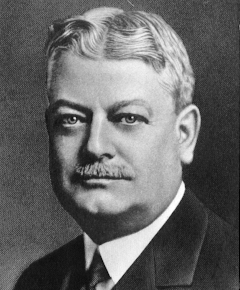

23rd Governor of Colorado
- In office January 9, 1923 – January 13, 1925
- Lieutenant: Robert Fay Rockwell
- Preceded by: Oliver Shoup
- Succeeded by: Clarence Morley

Personal details
- Born: January 27, 1869 Chicago, Illinois, US
- Died: May 9, 1942 (aged 73) Denver, Colorado, US
- Party: Democratic
- Spouse: Joyeuse L. Fullerton-Sweet (m. 1892)
- Profession: Governor
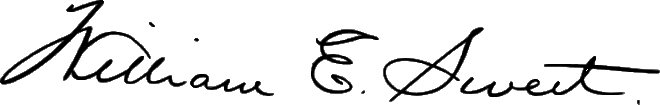
- Signature

William Ellery Sweet (January 27, 1869 – May 9, 1942) was an American banker and politician who served as the 23rd governor of Colorado from 1923 to 1925.

== Early life and career ==
William was born in Chicago, Illinois, on January 27, 1869, to Channing and Emeroy Sweet. His family moved to Colorado Springs, Colorado, in 1872 when William was two. He attended school there, and graduated from high school in 1887. After high school, he went to college in Philadelphia, Pennsylvania, at Swarthmore College. He graduated from Swarthmore in 1890, after three years attending, and earned his bachelor's degree. He also excelled playing quarterback for the college football team and was a member of Phi Kappa Psi fraternity.

On October 19, 1892, Sweet married Joyeuse L. Fullerton in Philadelphia. After their marriage, William moved to Denver. He decided to start up an investment banking firm, which led the Sweet family to become wealthy, and even let William retire in 1922. He donated much of his money to charities, including the Denver YMCA.

It wasn't until 1922 that he became active in politics. He joined the Democratic Party and gained most of his support from the farm and labor groups. He was a fierce opponent of the Ku Klux Klan and attributed his loss in the 1924 election to this opposition when he lost to Klansman and Republican nominee Clarence Morley, who ran with the support of the then-politically powerful Ku Klux Klan.

In 1924, after initially supporting McAdoo, he became a "favorite son" candidate for the Colorado delegation at the 1924 Democratic National Convention. In the 1928 presidential election, Sweet crossed party lines to support Herbert Hoover.

Sweet made two unsuccessful attempts to run for the United States Senate as the Democratic nominee in 1926 and for the Democratic nomination in 1936. In the final years of his life, William was a proud supporter of the Progressive Party. He died on May 9, 1942, in his Denver home. He had a Georgian Revival style mansion in what is now the Humboldt Street Historic District.

Party political offices
Preceded by James M. Collins	Democratic nominee for Governor of Colorado; 1922, 1924	Succeeded by Billy Adams
Preceded by Morrison Shafroth	Democratic nominee for U.S. Senator from Colorado (Class 3); 1926	Succeeded by Walter Walker
Political offices
Preceded by Oliver Shoup	Governor of Colorado; 1923–1925	Succeeded by Clarence Morley
