= Harold I. Johnston =

United States Army soldier

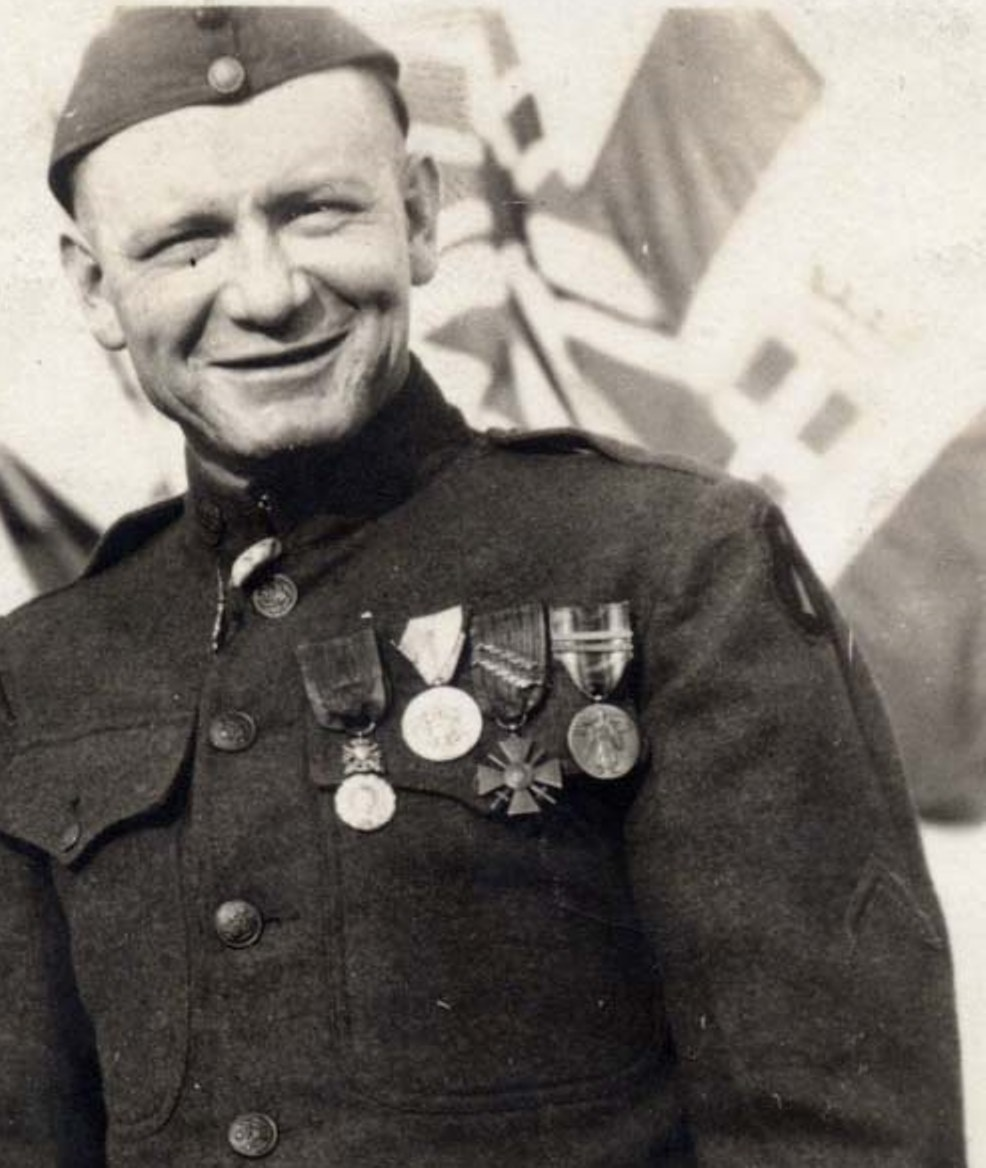
- Medal of Honor recipient
- Born: March 9, 1892; Kendell, Kansas
- Died: August 28, 1949 (aged 57)
- Burial place: Fairmount Cemetery (Denver, Colorado)
- Military career
- Allegiance: United States of America
- Branch: United States Army; United States Army Air Corps
- Rank: Sergeant (Army); Major (Army Air Corps)
- Service number: 2202872
- Units: Company A, 356th Infantry, 89th Division
- Conflicts: World War I
- Awards: Medal of Honor

Harold Irving Johnston (March 9, 1892 – August 28, 1949) was a soldier in the United States Army who received the Medal of Honor for his actions during World War I.

== Biography ==
Johnston was born in Kendall, Kansas on March 9, 1892, and died August 28, 1949. He is buried in Fairmount Cemetery, Denver, Colorado.

== Medal of Honor citation ==
Rank and organization: Sergeant (then Private First Class), U.S. Army, Company A, 356th Infantry, 89th Division. Place and date: Near Pouilly, France, 9 November 1918. Entered service at: Chicago, Ill. Birth: Kendell, Kans. C O. No.: 20, W.D., 1919.

Citation:

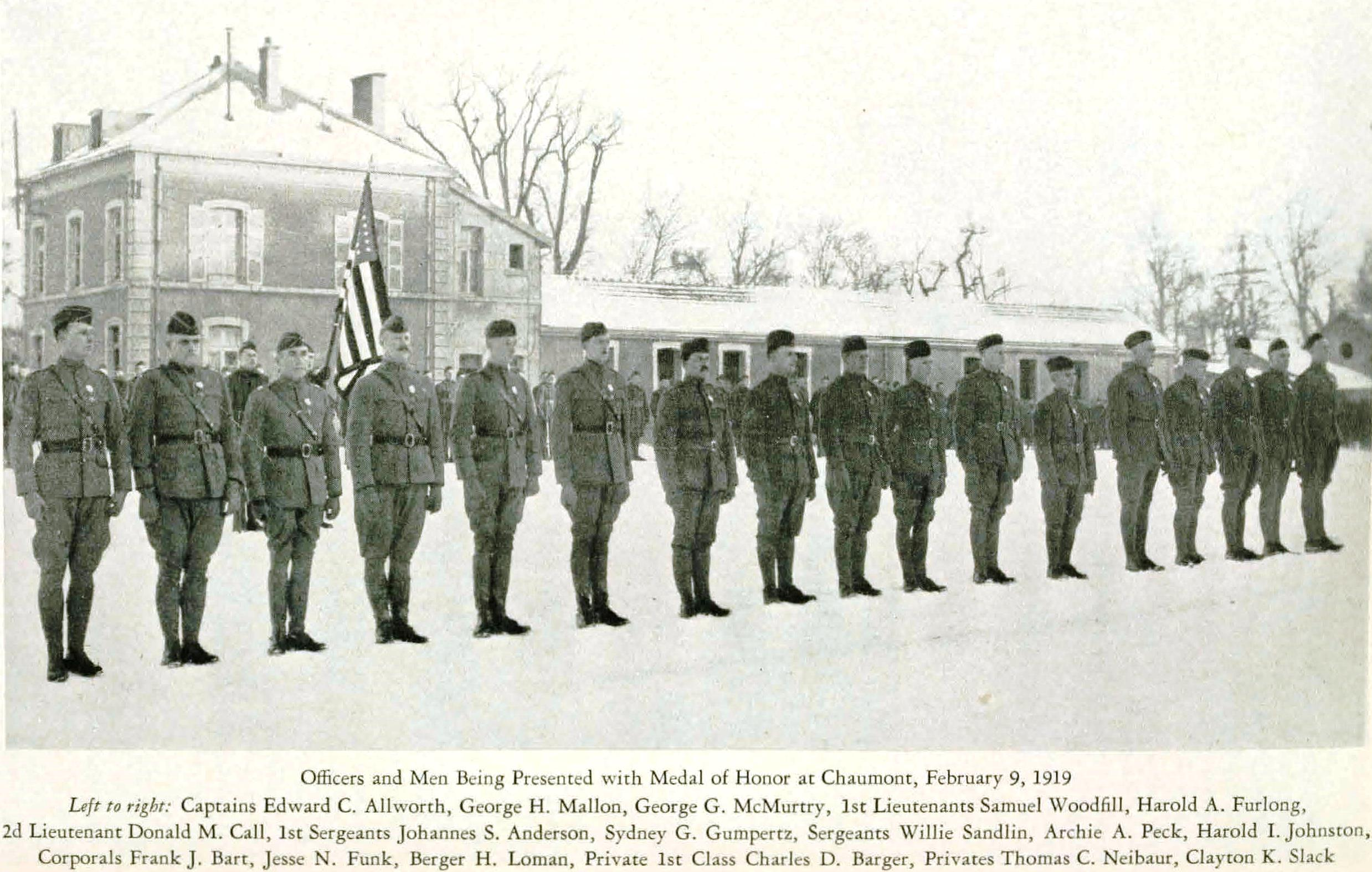
Medal of Honor Presentation Ceremony - February 9, 1919, at Chaumont, France. General John J. Pershing presided.

When information was desired as to the enemy's position on the opposite side of the Meuse River, Sgt. Johnston, with another soldier, volunteered without hesitation and swam the river to reconnoiter the exact location of the enemy. He succeeded in reaching the opposite bank, despite the evident determination of the enemy to prevent a crossing. Having obtained his information, he again entered the water for his return. This was accomplished after a severe struggle which so exhausted him that he had to be assisted from the water, after which he rendered his report of the exploit.

== See also ==
- List of Medal of Honor recipients
- List of Medal of Honor recipients for World War I
