= 1924 Colorado gubernatorial election =

- November 4, 1924
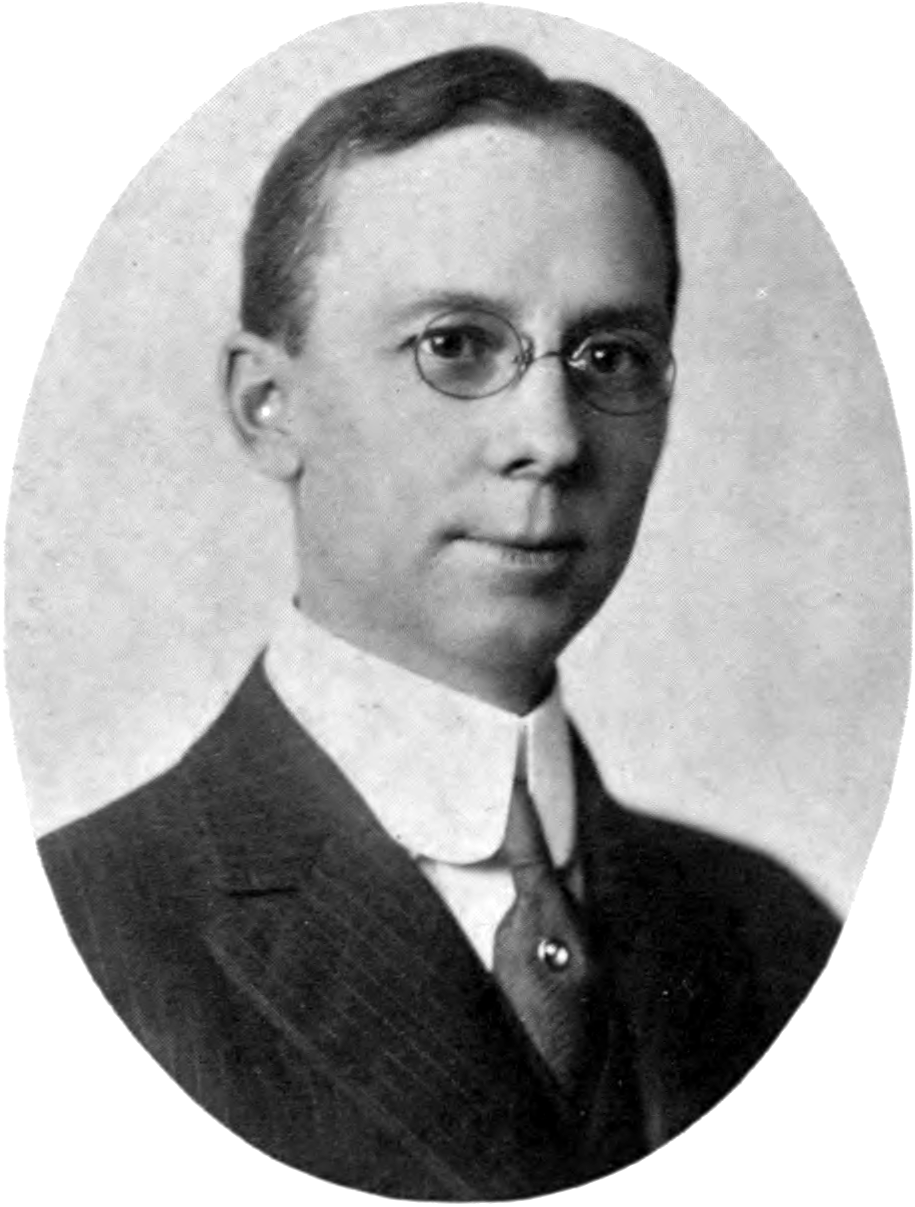

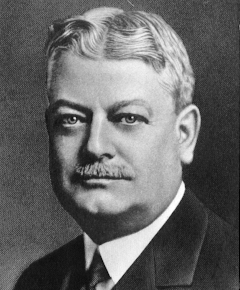
Nominee	Clarence Morley	William Ellery Sweet
Party	Republican	Democratic
Popular vote	178,078	151,041
Percentage	51.92%	44.04%
- County results Morley: 40–50% 50–60% 60–70% Sweet: 40–50% 50–60%
Governor before election
William Ellery Sweet
Democratic
Elected Governor
Clarence Morley
Republican

The 1924 Colorado gubernatorial election was held on November 4, 1924. Republican nominee Clarence Morley defeated Democratic incumbent William Ellery Sweet with 51.92% of the vote. Morley was supported by the Ku Klux Klan, a white supremacist terrorist organization.

== Primary elections ==
Primary elections were held on September 9, 1924.

=== Democratic primary ===
==== Candidates ====
- William Ellery Sweet, incumbent Governor

==== Results ====
Shades of red: Morley Shades of Orange: Rockwell

Democratic primary results
Party	Candidate	Votes	%
Democratic	William Ellery Sweet (incumbent)	43,160	100.00
Total votes		43,160	100.00

=== Republican primary ===
The Ku Klux Klan, established in Colorado in 1922, had become very powerful under the leadership of Grand Dragon John Galen Locke. In 1924, the Klan seized control of much of the party, especially in the Denver area, where mayor Benjamin F. Stapleton was first elected with Klan support (though he later turned his back on the Klan). Locke pushed Judge Morley, who was Klansman number 953 in Colorado. An early and loyal supporter, Locke suspected Morley would obey his every command. During his term as governor, this proved correct. According to the History Colorado Center, Locke was in frequent contact by telephone and letters. Indeed, "One man in the governor's office had as his primary duty the carrying of written messages between the Capitol and Locke's Glenarm Place office. For all practical purposes, Locke was the governor." Locke and Morley were opposed by incumbent Lt. Governor Robert F. Rockwell, a rancher and farmer from Western Colorado. Earl Cooley, another anti-Klan Republican, gained a small portion of the vote. In the end, though Rockwell was able to nearly sweep Western Colorado, Morley was carried across the finish line with a plurality thanks to strong support in Denver and Northeastern Colorado.

==== Candidates ====
- Clarence Morley, Denver District Court Judge
- Robert F. Rockwell, incumbent Lieutenant Governor
- Earl Cooley, former Lieutenant Governor

==== Results ====
Republican primary results
Party	Candidate	Votes	%
Republican	Clarence Morley	57,152	48.9%
Republican	Robert F. Rockwell	51,976	44.5%
Republican	Earl Cooley	7,712	6.6%
Total votes		116,840	

== General election ==
=== Candidates ===
Major party candidates

- Clarence Morley, Republican
- William Ellery Sweet, Democratic

Other candidates

- Frank Cass, Farmer–Labor
- William R. Dietrich, Workers
- Louis E. Leeder, Independent

=== Results ===
1924 Colorado gubernatorial election
Party	Candidate	Votes	%	±%
Republican	Clarence Morley	178,078	51.92%	+3.63%
Democratic	William Ellery Sweet (incumbent)	151,041	44.04%	−5.60%
Farmer–Labor	Frank Cass	10,843	3.16%	+2.43%
Workers	William R. Dietrich	1,582	0.46%	N/A
Independent	Louis E. Leeder	1,418	0.41%	N/A
Majority		27,037	7.88%	
Turnout		342,962		
Republican gain from Democratic		Swing		
