= Priscilla Baird =

American academic administrator (1828–1904)

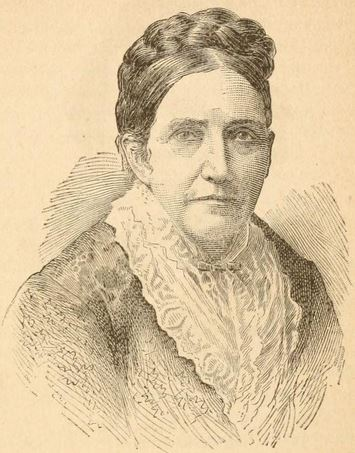
- Born: Priscilla A. Davis; 1828; Shelby County, Kentucky
- Died: 1904 (aged 75–76); Denver, Colorado
- Other names: Mrs. J. K. Baird; Mrs. H. T. Baird
- Occupations: educator, women's education advocate
- Years active: 1851-1897
- Known for: founding Baird College

Priscilla Baird (1828–1904) was a pioneering teacher in Missouri and Illinois and an advocate for girls' education. She began her career in Shelbyville, Missouri in 1851. She then taught at Liberty Female College and Lancaster schools before relocating to Illinois during the civil war and teaching at the Springfield High School. Returning to Missouri, she taught at Ingleside College in Palmyra, Missouri and at Hardin College in Mexico, Missouri. After completing nearly thirty years of teaching, she founded the Baird College in 1885, where she remained until her retirement in 1897.

== Early life ==
Priscilla A. Davis was born in 1828 in Shelby County, Kentucky to Harriet M. (née Bell) and Samuel E. Davis. She studied with private tutors in her youth and attended Julia A. Tevis's Science Hill Female Academy in Shelbyville, Kentucky. At the age of fourteen, she was converted to the Baptist faith through her grandfather Francis Davis and an elder, George Waller. Waller also performed Davis' marriage ceremony on March 12, 1846, when she married Jesse K. Baird in Shelby County. Five years after their marriage, the couple moved to Missouri, along with their three children: M. Belle (born 1847), Thomas D. (born 1849) and Itonia J. (born 1851).

== Career ==
Baird began teaching at a private school in Shelbyville, Missouri around 1851 and remained at the school for four years. The institution was a Baptist school and she taught under the direction of elders W. F. Broadus and John L. Waller. The family then moved to Liberty in Clay County, Missouri, where Baird taught at the Liberty Female College, which was affiliated with the William Jewell College. She and her brother, John T. Davis each served as associate president of the college for four years, before Baird moved to Lancaster, Schuyler County, Missouri. She taught from 1860 to 1863 in Lancaster, but as the Civil War moved west, the family moved to Springfield, Illinois. Baird taught at the Springfield High School for seven years, while her husband, a surveyor by trade, served in the Confederate States Army. Jesse's exposure to the conditions during the war of camp life and long marches, caused health problems. Though he survived the war, he died at the age of 49 in 1871.

While in Springfield, Baird was recruited to become the president of Ingleside College in Palmyra, Missouri, where she began work in 1873. She hired an ex-slave, Sina Banks as her cook. Banks would remain with her for the next thirty years. The business manager of the college was Homer T. Baird, with whom Baird would marry on April 25, 1875. In addition to administering the school, Baird taught arithmetic and history, though the fees charged were inadequate to cover the costs of running the establishment, according to one of her former pupils, Robert Coontz, who would become a rear admiral in the United States Navy. She remained at Ingleside for six years and tendered her resignation when she was appointed president of Hardin College and Conservatory of Music. The couple moved to Mexico, Missouri to take up the post and continued with Homer as business manager and Baird serving as the school principal and teacher. During her tenure at Hardin, the school grew from a small number of enrollees to having several hundred students and both of her daughters taught at the school.

In 1885, the family moved to Clinton, Missouri, where they began operating a school they had founded known as Baird College. Within 2 years of its opening, the school had around 100 boarding students and 300 attendees, being taught art, elocution, languages, and music. Though it was a Christian-based school, it operated as non-denominational. Baird ran the school until 1897, when she decided to close it due to poor health. In 1903, the Bairds moved to Denver, Colorado, where her daughter Itonia was teaching French at West High School.

In addition to teaching and administrating schools, Baird was active in church work and organized many Sunday school and Bible classes. She served as Secretary of the Missouri Baptist State Women's Association for many years. She also was a staunch supporter of education for women and girls and presented a paper at the World's Congress of Representative Women in Chicago in 1893, which received wide support.

== Death and legacy ==
Baird died on October 13, 1904, in Denver, Colorado. Her three children all became prominent professionals. Her son Thomas D. Baird became a physician and at one time was the president of the Colorado State Board of Medical Examiners. Her two daughters, Belle True and Itonia J. Baird both became educators.
