= Bertha M. Paxton =

American politician

Member of the New Mexico House of Representatives for Doña Ana County
- In office 1923–1924

Personal details
- Born: 1896 Las Cruces, New Mexico, United States
- Died: 1966 (aged 69–70)
- Party: Democratic

Bertha M. (McAntire) Paxton (1896–1966) born in Las Cruces, New Mexico, United States, was a Democratic politician.

Paxton was the first woman elected to the New Mexico Legislature, serving one two-year term in the New Mexico House of Representatives from 1923 to 1924, representing Doña Ana County.

== Life and career ==
Bertha M. McAntire was born in Las Cruces, Dona Ana County, New Mexico. She attended Baird College in Missouri. After graduating, she married J.H. Paxton and settled in Las Cruces, where she was known as "a dynamic figure who was a forceful speaker and original thinker".

Bertha M. Paxton was elected to the New Mexico House of Representatives in 1922, becoming the first female state legislator. In the legislature, Paxton successfully passed a resolution for the observance of Mother's Day. Paxton also sponsored bills on vocational education, child welfare reform, and programs for agricultural cooperative marketing. She was appointed chair of the committee on enrolled bills.

Paxton was not re-elected.
