= James H. Turpin =

American soldier in the United States Army

- Born: c. 1846; Easton, Massachusetts, United States
- Died: May 6, 1893 (aged 47); Denver, Colorado
- Burial place: Fairmount Cemetery
- Military career
- Allegiance: United States
- Branch: United States Army
- Service years: c. 1872–1874
- Rank: First Sergeant
- Unit: 5th U.S. Cavalry
- Conflicts: Indian Wars; Apache Wars
- Awards: Medal of Honor

First Sergeant James H. Turpin (c. 1846 – May 6, 1893) was an American soldier in the United States Army who served with the fifth U.S. Cavalry regiment during the Apache Wars. Turpin was one of 12 men received the Medal of Honor for gallantry in several engagements with the Apache Indians in the Arizona Territory during Lieutenant Colonel George Crook's "winter campaign" between 1872 and 1873.

== Biography ==
James H. Turpin was born in Easton, Massachusetts in about 1846. He enlisted in the United States Army in Boston, Massachusetts as a private. Turpin was assigned to frontier duty, and served with Company L of the Fifth Cavalry Regiment, seeing action during the Apache Wars and eventually reached the rank of First Sergeant.

In late 1872, Turpin accompanied Lieutenant Colonel George Crook in his "winter campaign" against the Apache renegades still active in the Arizona Territory, following the surrender of Apache Chief Cochise. Turpin was involved in heavy fighting in the Tonto Basin region, where Western Apache and Yavapais raiding parties had been active for many years. He was one of 23 expedition members who were presented with the Medal of Honor, his citation reading "gallantry in actions with Apaches".

Turpin died on May 6, 1893, at the age of 47 and was interred at Fairmount Cemetery in Denver, Colorado.

== Medal of Honor citation ==
Rank and organization: First Sergeant, Company L, 5th U.S. Cavalry. Place and date: Arizona, 1872–74. Entered service at: --. Birth: Easton, Mass. Date of issue: 12 April 1875.

Citation: Gallantry in actions with Apaches.

== See also ==
- List of Medal of Honor recipients for the Indian Wars
