= Clarence Morley =

American politician (1869–1948)

Clarence Joseph Morley
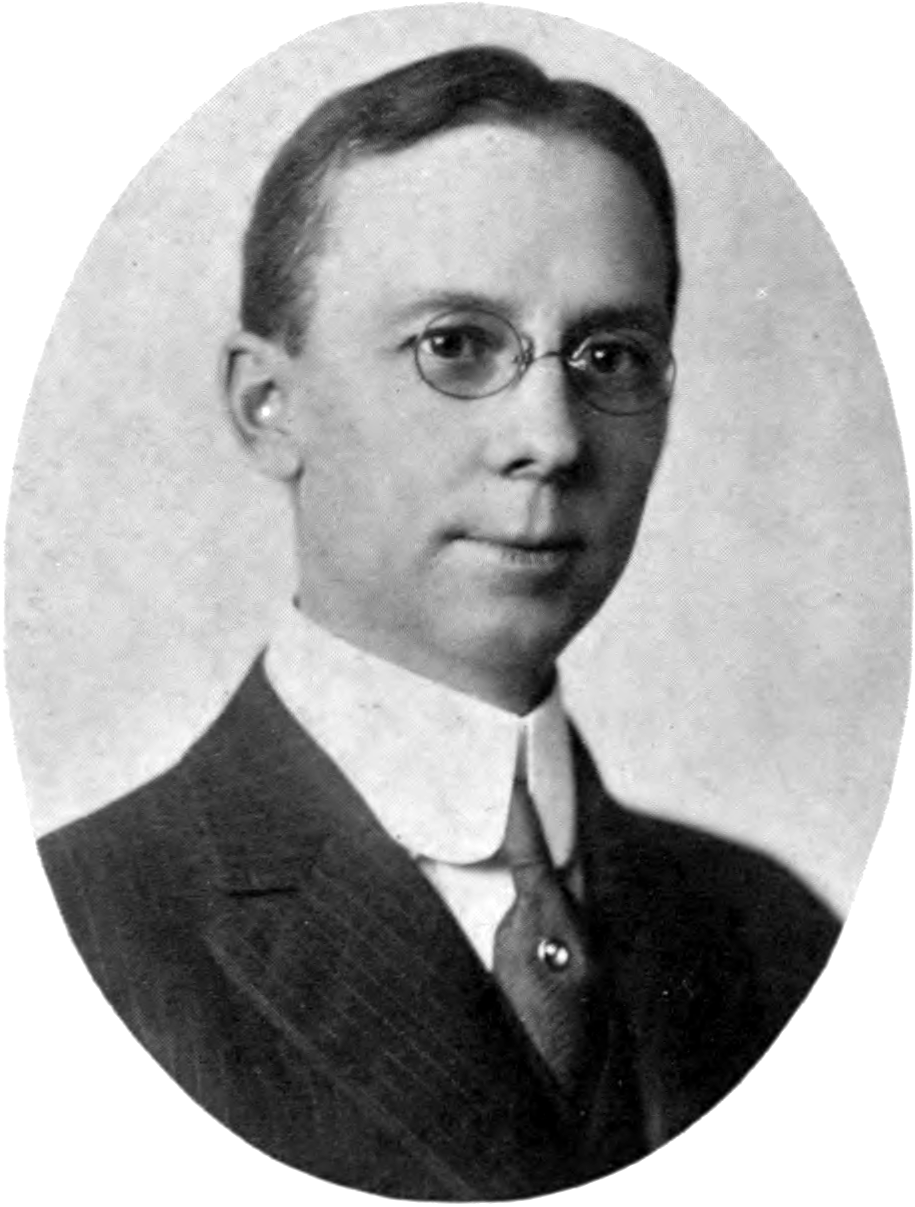

24th Governor of Colorado
- In office January 13, 1925 – January 11, 1927
- Lieutenant: Sterling Byrd Lacy
- Preceded by: William E. Sweet
- Succeeded by: Billy Adams

Personal details
- Born: February 9, 1869 Dyersville, Iowa, US
- Died: November 15, 1948 (aged 79) Oklahoma City, Oklahoma, US
- Party: Republican
- Spouse: Maud Marie Thompson Morley
- Children: 4

Clarence Joseph Morley (February 9, 1869 – November 15, 1948) was the 24th governor of Colorado from 1925 to 1927, serving one two-year term. He was a Republican. Before becoming governor he was a judge in Denver, Colorado. He was a member of the Ku Klux Klan which was an important force in Colorado politics during the 1920s and largely responsible for the division of the Republican and Democratic votes that enabled him to take office.

== Tenure as governor ==
Morely took office on January 16, 1925, in a ceremony at the Municipal Auditorium in Denver.

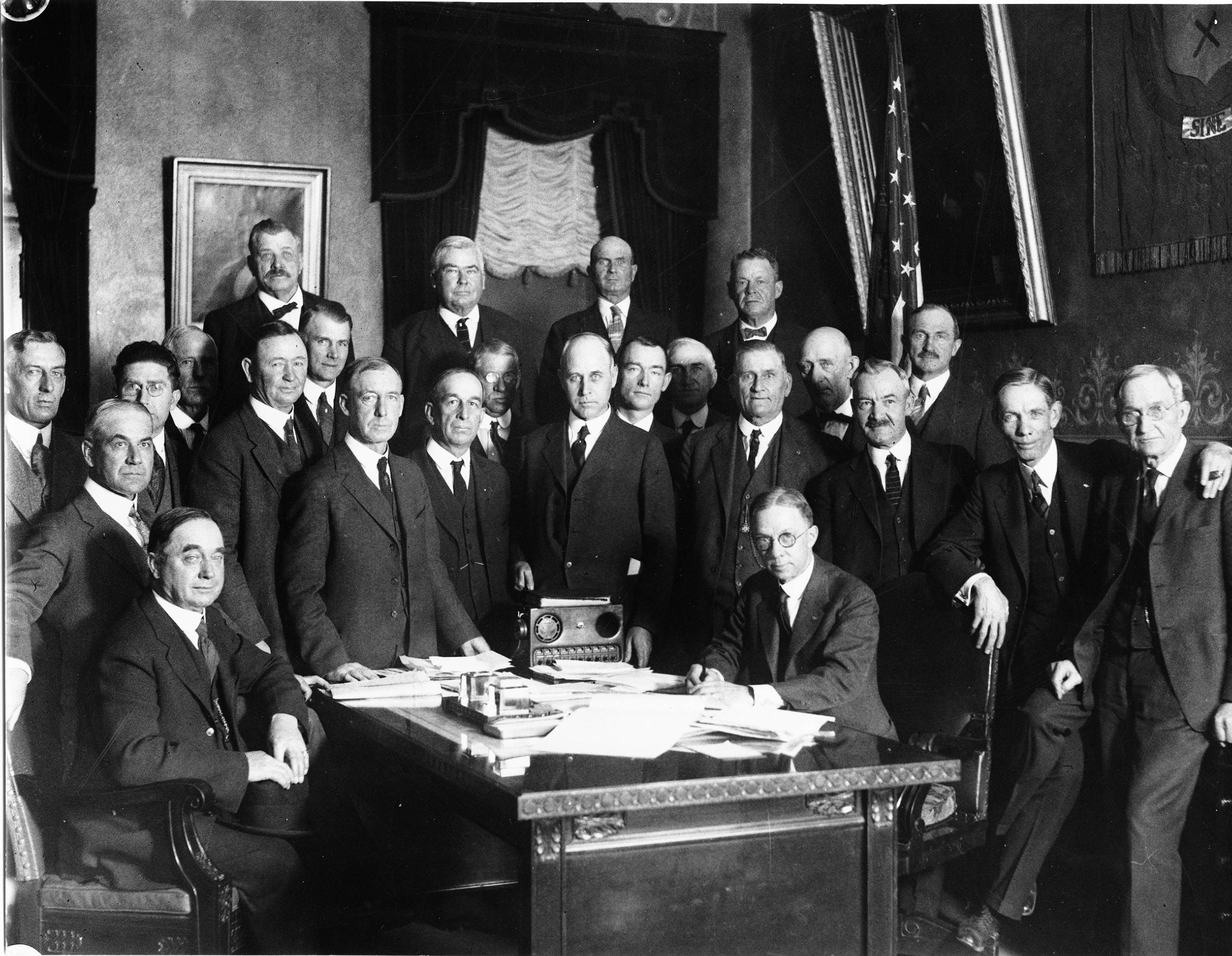
Morley signing bills in 1925

Virulently anti-Catholic, Morley was one of the most extreme governors in Colorado history. The Center for Colorado & the West at the Auraria Library wrote:

His vitriol toward all things un-American was thinly veiled as an attack on Catholics, and further, on immigration. His goal wasn’t simply to eliminate the use of demon alcohol by banning the use of sacramental wine; it was to stop key elements of Catholic practice, thus the religion itself. Morley espoused the view that if public schools weren't good enough for Catholic children, then Catholics should not teach in public schools. He agitated for the University of Colorado to fire all non-Protestant (that is, Catholic and Jewish) professors.

Morely's administration was marked by "scandals and ineptitude."

== Mail fraud conviction ==
After leaving office, Morley established C.J. Morley & Company, a stock brokerage firm in Indianapolis, Indiana. In 1935, Morley was arrested on charges from mail fraud; he was convicted for 21 counts of mail fraud and using political influences to defraud customers. Sentenced to five years in Leavenworth Prison, he died three years after being released. He is buried in Denver at Fairmount Cemetery.

Party political offices
Preceded by Benjamin Griffith	Republican nominee for Governor of Colorado; 1924	Succeeded by Oliver Henry Shoup
Political offices
Preceded by William Ellery Sweet	Governor of Colorado; 1925–1927	Succeeded by William Herbert Adams
