= Edward G. Stoiber =

American Engineer

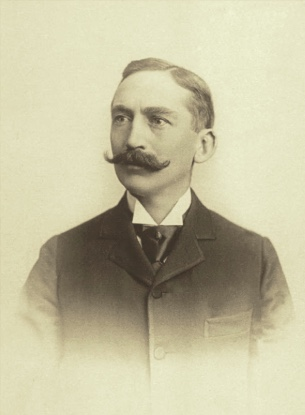
- Born: September 18, 1855; New York, New York
- Died: April 21, 1906 (aged 50); Paris, France
- Burial place: Fairmount Cemetery, Denver, Colorado
- Education: School of Mines, Freiberg, Germany
- Occupations: Mining engineer and businessman
- Spouse: Lena Stoiber

Edward G. Stoiber (September 18, 1855 – April 21, 1906) was an American mining engineer and owner of the Silver Lakes Mines and Mills near Silverton, Colorado. Stoiber went to Germany and completed a mining degree program. When he returned he began working as a mining engineer in Leadville, Colorado. In the mid-1880s, he went into business with his brother Gustavus, establishing a mill and mine in San Jan County near Silverton. By 1887, the brothers decided to part ways, with Edward keeping the Silver Lake mine. The following year he married Lena Allen Webster who would become joint owner of the business and an operational manager. Edward focused on mining engineering, which was crucial to find economical ways to mine and process low-grade ore. He investigated mining practices and ore processing until he was able to become a profitable enterprise that also brought prosperity to the San Juan mining district. Lena was a hard-driving, yet also caring manager, ensuring that the mining operations were effective. That included wearing men's clothes and performing work as needed. They were involved in community, philanthropic, and industry efforts, including dual-membership in the American Institute of Mining Engineers.

== Early life ==
Stoiber was born September 18, 1855, in New York, New York. (Note: He is also said to have been born in Germany in 1854.) His parents were Helena Rouse and Felix Stoiber, who were members of the German Evangelical Mission Church in New York City. He was a graduate of the School of Mines at Freiberg.

== Career ==
=== Background ===
Because of the rugged terrain, little headway could be made in tapping the rich gold and silver deposits as long as the veins could only be reached by mule train over dangerous mountain trials, Things changed dramatically in the 1890s. As Duane Smith notes, this decade marked the coming of the end of an era dominated by graduates of the school of hard knocks. College-trained men moved to the forefront, to the dismay of many old-timers. They knew geology, mining engineering, and smelting. One of this new breed [was] Edward G. Stoiber.

— Robert A. Trennert, Riding on the High Wire

When prospectors first came to Colorado in search of gold or silver, they were more likely to find relatively high concentrations of metal as compared to rock. As the metal-rich mines were tapped out, lower-grade ore remained. That meant that the milling process had higher ratios of rock to metal and the extraction process would be more expensive. After a decade or two of heaving mining, there needed to be new more cost-effective processes to mine and process lower-grade ore to make a profit.

=== Early years ===
He began work as a mining engineer, joining the American Institute of Mining Engineers in 1877. He worked in Leadville for three years. On January 30, 1879, he married Gertrude Comstock in Clear Creek County, Colorado. He was single and living with his brother in San Juan County by 1885. In the mid-1880s Edward and his brother Gustavus obtained 200 claims at the head of Arrastra Gulch and established the Silver Lake Mine and operated a custom ore sampler. Edward became interested in a lode near Silver Lake and began buying claims. He established a mine at the lake, which was above the timberline at 12,250 feet in elevation. He began building one of the most modern mining facilities in the West, including a mill complex at Silver Lake. It was the first concentrating mill at that high altitude.

The brothers had a disagreement in 1887 and dissolved their partnership with Edward retaining the mine. He investigated processes and devices for the treatment of ores and became one of the earliest operators to make a profit processing low-grade mixed sulphide ores.

=== Partnership with Lena ===
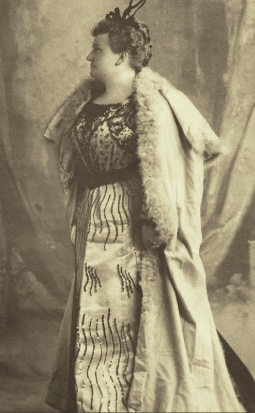
Lena Allen Stoiber, by 1913

Lena Allen Webster came to Silverton in 1884 as a married woman and her husband, F. C. Webster, disappeared or died mysteriously a few months later. (Note: Helen Allen, who later chose to be called Lena, was born in St. Anthony, Minnesota on April 2, 1862 or 1864. She was married by 1882 to a lawyer named F. C. Webster. They lived in Grand Junction until 1884 when her husband set up a law office in Silverton. A few months after that, Webster died or left town mysteriously. She then announced her engagement to Edward Stoiber.) Edward married Lena in Chicago on March 29, 1888. When the business was in its infancy, Lena started taking in boarders. She then became involved in the business by working in the mine and installing machinery. She wore men's clothing while she worked. They were joint owners. While Edward ran the engineering portion of the business, his wife Lena managed the miners. She gained the nickname of "Captain Jack" for her colorful language and tough demeanor. Lena became an associate member of the American Institute of Mining Engineers in 1894 and remained a member until her death in 1935.

=== Business growth ===
He had an 8,640 Bleichert tramway built in 1895 by the Trenton Iron Company to move the ore down the mountain to Arrastra Gulch. The tramway was capable of moving five tons of material per hour. The concentrates were then transported to a branch of the Silverton Railroad. He continued to expand his mining business, involving a partnership with J.H. Robin. He added another mill and a faster tramway, able to move 30 tons of material per hour. His business success led to prosperity within the San Juan mining district.

== Waldheim ==
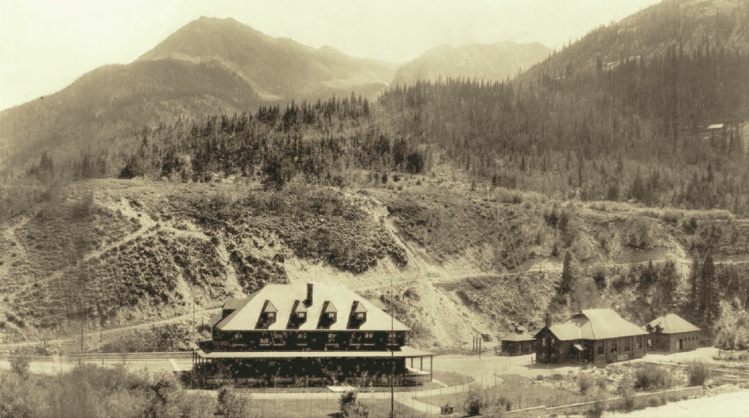
Waldheim, the Stoiber mansion in Silverton, about 1900. On the right is the hydropower plant that served the mansion, mine, and mill.

Edward and Lena built a mansion called Waldheim, meaning forest home, in Silverton in 1897. Used as a home and office, the mansion had a conservatory, theater, and a ballroom. They built a hydropower plant to provide electricity to their mine, mill, and mansion. In 1901, he sold the Silver Lakes Mines to the American Smelting and Refining Company for $2.35 million (equivalent to $90,945,000 in 2025). (Note: The Las Animas Leader said that he sold Silver Lakes Mine to Guggenheim Exploration Company. In 1901, Daniel Guggenheim (also David) took over American Smelting and Refining Company.)

== Personal life ==
Edward was well-respected by his employees, who he treated with kindness and consideration. He sought to improve the welfare of the mining industry across Colorado. Among his large gifts to educational institutions, he donated an elaborate set of instruments to the Colorado School of Mines and established a scientific section at the University Club library.

Lena hosted dances and other entertainment for the workers, delivered presents to children at Christmas, and was a stalwart partner to her husband, doing whatever needed to be done to make the business run effectively. She also treated the workers well. Lena helped to establish Mesa Verde as a national park. She also founded a woman's group to do practical and historical literary work. Conversely, she could have a difficult temperament. For instance, Lena developed a tendency to build high walls between her neighbors and herself, both in her first house in Silverton with Edward and later at the mansion in Denver. After her Silverton neighbors added a second story to reclaim their view, she installed billboards above the fence to block it again.

== Later years and death ==
After he sold his business, the Stoibers lived in Denver and traveled throughout Europe and the Far East. They lived in Paris, France beginning in 1904, but were planning on returning to Denver to build a mansion based on his sketches. Edward contracted typhoid fever on April 3, 1906, and died in Paris on April 21. Lena had a mausoleum built for him at Fairmount Cemetery. It was made of Vermont granite at a cost of about $30,000. The interior was made of Parian marble.

After Edward died, Lena worked with architects using his sketches to have the Stoiber Mansion built in Denver in 1907. In 1909, Lena married Hugh Rood, a capitalist from the Pacific Coast. He died on the RMS Titanic, after which Lena Stoiber-Rood went to Europe. On May 20, 1918, she married Commander Mark St. Clair Ellis of the United States Navy. She then went by the name of Lena Allen Stoiber-Ellis. She separated from Ellis following lawsuits that were brought by another woman. They were divorced March 15, 1932. Lena died on March 27, 1935, at her villa on Lake Como in Stresa, Italy.
