= Verner Z. Reed =

American businessman and writer

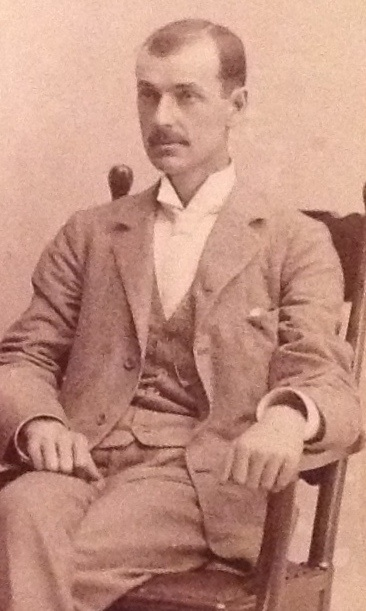
- Born: Verner Zevola Reed; October 13, 1863; Richland County, Ohio, US
- Died: April 20, 1919 (aged 55); Coronado, California, US

Signature
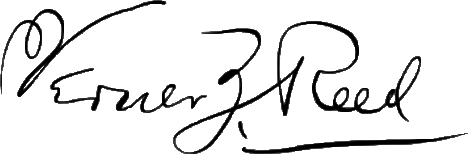

Verner Zevola Reed (October 13, 1863 – April 20, 1919) was an American capitalist, mediator, lecturer, and author. He became one of Colorado's most important and enterprising pioneers and played an important role in Colorado's early history and became one of the state's wealthiest citizens.

== Early life ==
Verner Zevola Reed was born in Richland County, Ohio on October 13, 1863. He grew up on an Iowa farm and helped his father support the family of thirteen children. He developed a literary talent and attended two terms at the Eastern Iowa Normal School.

== Career ==
=== Business ===
After a brief period working as a journalist for the Chicago Tribune, he moved with his half-brother who sought tuberculosis treatment in Colorado Springs, Colorado. He began writing promotional brochures for tourists. He then owned and operated a real estate office. Realizing the need for housing for the growing city, he built and sold small houses. He brought the rest of his family to Colorado, and his father and brother, Hugh and Raymond, joined him in the real estate business in 1890. The firm was named Reed Brothers. Five years later, Reed consolidated his private holdings into Reed Building and expanded his business across the state. He sold his share of Reed Brothers.

In 1893, he promoted Cripple Creek, Colorado in the wake of its gold rush. He was involved primarily in various silver and copper mining operations in Colorado through the turn-of-the-century. In 1901, he earned a $1 million commission from the sale of Winfield Scott Stratton's Independence Mine to an English syndicate, and having made his fortune in minerals, he subsequently invested in real estate in and around Colorado Springs, Colorado and through ventures such as the Western Sugar Land Company. In the early years of the twentieth century, he and his wife, Mary, sailed for Europe, where they lived for more than a decade in Paris, Rome and the South of France. After his return to America in 1913, he continued to expand his fortune with the accumulation of oil fields in Wyoming. Over his career, he was also involved in banking, manufacturing, ranching, land reclamation, and irrigation enterprises in Colorado, Wyoming, and other states.

=== Cultural and political studies ===
In addition to his business interests, he also made extensive studies of the Mythologies of Native Americans, especially among the Utes and some of the Puebloan peoples. He was widely known as a lecturer on peace, international politics and kindred subjects. He was author of several books: Lo-To-Kah, Tales Of The Sunland, Adobeland Stories and The Soul Of Paris, and had also contributed essays, editorials and stories to magazines and newspapers.

=== Mediation ===
In 1917, he was one of the original of the Special Mediation Commission appointed by President Woodrow Wilson soon after the United States went to war (World War I) to undertake adjustment of industrial labor trouble. He is credited with having played a large part in quieting unrest which threatened war preparations. The commission late in 1917, made a trip of many weeks through the West investigating deportations and dissatisfaction in the Arizona copper district, labor troubles on the Pacific Coast, in Colorado, and in Minnesota and Saint Paul, Minnesota, and differences between the Chicago packers and their employees. Subsequently, he took a prominent part in the investigation and settlement of trouble in the Louisiana oil fields.

== Personal life ==
Reed lived with his family until 1893, when he married Mary (Johnson) Reed. They had three children. The Stoiber-Reed-Humphreys Mansion house in the present Humboldt Street Historic District was owned by the Reeds from about 1912 to 1920.

He died in Coronado, California on April 20, 1919. He left his wife an estate valued at approximately $20 million (equivalent to $362,725,528 in 2024) which she used in the pursuit of various philanthropic endeavors in the Colorado community, such as Margery Reed Hall and construction of a new library on the campus of the University of Denver. The Denver Post once cited her as "Colorado's richest widow". Although she gave a lot of money to philanthropic endeavors, she was able to add $6 million to the estate before she died in 1945.
