= Mattie Silks =

American madam

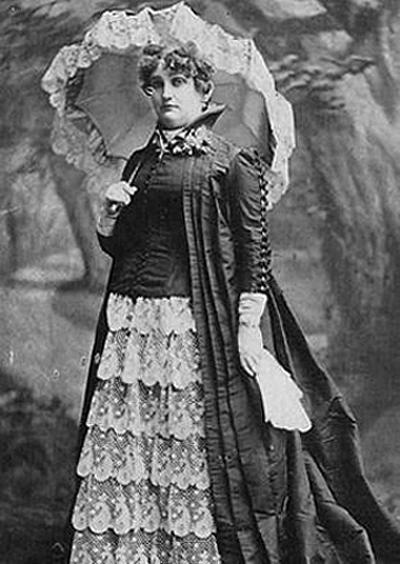
- Mattie Silks
- Born: 1846; Fayette County, Pennsylvania, US
- Died: January 7, 1929 (aged 82–83); Denver, Colorado, US
- Resting place: Fairmount Cemetery, Denver, Colorado
- Other name: Martha Ready
- Occupations: Prostitute, brothel madam

Mattie Silks, or Martha Ready (1846– 7 January 1929), was a prostitute and leading madam in the late 19th century American West.

== Early life ==
Mattie Silks was born Martha A. Nimon in Fayette County, Pennsylvania in 1845. Silks was one of five children born to farmers Henry and Sarah Nimon. Little is known about Silks' childhood other than her family moved to Erie, Indiana, in 1850. Silks left her family home some time between 1860 and 1865. She may have traveled to Kansas or Springfield, Illinois.

It is not certain whether she immediately went to work as a prostitute upon leaving home. According to author Jan MacKell Collins, many historians are of the opinion that she may have worked as a freighter on wagon trains. Still, It is possible that Silks worked as both a freighter and madam while residing in Kansas as some historians contend that she was run out of Olathe, Kansas, before working the cattle trails. Having worked as a prostitute in Abilene, Texas and Dodge City, Kansas, she became owner of a brothel in Springfield, Illinois, in 1865. She was 19 at the time. Silks placed a sign on one of her first parlor houses which read, "Men taken in and done for." Silks became one of the best-known madams in the west, having brothels in Dodge City, Georgetown, Colorado and Denver, Colorado, where demand for women was high as a result of the Colorado gold rushes.

== Traveling west ==
Silks and four girls she hired in Kansas City traveled to Denver by way of stage coach and freight wagon. Her coach was equipped with a "portable boarding" house where the girls conducted business while on the road. The ladies set up shop at the many mining towns they visited on their way to Denver. Silks was a savvy business lady. It was her habit to set up camp below town, she explained, "because prospective patrons would more willingly walk down a mountainside than climb it."

== Life in Denver ==
Silks was one of Denver's most memorable madams as she is quite popular in Denver folklore. She was described as a very good looking woman, with spirit and a competitive nature. According to Forbes Parkhill, Silks first visited Denver in 1869, though she did not move there until 1876 or 1877. The Rocky Mountain News reported Silks was fined for drunkenness in March 1877. Silks had a head for business. Before purchasing property in Denver, she rented a house on Holladay Street where she conducted business. She bought her first brothel at 501 Holladay Street (now Market Street) from Nellie French for $13,000 and suffered from stiff competition from other brothels. Silks also conducted business out of buildings on either side of her brothel.

In August 1877 Silks engaged in the now famous duel with another madam, Katie Fulton. It was the first recorded duel in Denver between two women. 'According to historian Katy Ordway, Cortez Thomson was Katie's lover before his meeting Mattie. The duel was allegedly a jealous feud over Cortez. There are many versions of the incident. One version has Mattie and Katie shooting at each other while both are topless. Another version says Mattie, who was known to carry a pistol, caught Cortez and Katie in a compromising position and challenged Katie to a duel. According to Collins, the Denver Daily Times reported that

Katie and Mattie had an argument following a footrace. Thompson won the race, and Mattie collected $2,000. A fight broke out involving several people, including Mattie, Thompson, Katie, and Katie's lover Sam Thatcher. Katie received the worst of it: During the fray she was punched, knocked down twice, and kicked in the face, breaking her nose. Afterward, as Thompson returned to Denver in a buggy, another carriage pulled up beside him and he was shot in the neck, though not fatally. Katie left town for a while but returned in September, where she had another fight with Mattie. This time Mattie punched Katie, knocking her down and injuring her nose again.

Mattie was an intelligent business woman. She bought, sold, and rented property throughout the 1870s, 80's, 90's and early twentieth century. Her real estate included a ranch in Yuma and a fashionable home at 2635 Lawrence Street, away from the Red-Light District. From 1877 to 1897 her brothel was the most successful in Denver. Silks was known as the “Queen of Denver's Red Light District”. In 1898, Madam Jennie Rogers opened the House of Mirrors in Denver, and quickly became more successful than any of the competition. Jennie Rogers died in 1909, after which Silks purchased the House of Mirrors for $14,000. She continued to work as a madam, traveled, and invested in real estate, becoming a very wealthy woman.

== Married life ==
Mattie Silks arrived in Georgetown, Colorado in 1875. There, she a met a man by the name of George or Casey Silks. Sources are unclear as to whether Mattie married Mr. Silks or lived with him as a common law wife; Collins is of the opinion that at the very least Mattie and Silks lived together as common law husband and wife for a couple of years. Forbes Parkhill said it is likely the two were never married as evidence of a marriage or a divorce has never surfaced. It was alleged that Mattie bore a child with George, but there is no evidence to substantiate the rumor. By the time Silks arrived in Denver, the relationship between her and George was over.

Mattie also met Cortez Thompson while residing in Georgetown. Cortez was a well known foot racer. Mattie bet on him at one of his races and won $2,000. Mattie operated one of the five brothels on Brownell Street in Georgetown. Cortez and George both occupied a room in her brothel. When Mattie left Georgetown for Denver she was accompanied by Cortez, who had left his wife and young daughter to be with Mattie.

Silks and Cortez were lovers for years before they married in Miami County, Indiana, on July 6, 1884, four days after Cortez received news of his wife's passing. Life with Cortez was chaotic. He was described as having less than gentlemanly morals. Katy Ordway, author of Shady Dames of Denver, described Cortez as a gambler with propensity towards violence. Mattie financially supported both herself and Cortez. He would often use her money to support his gambling and drinking habits. He was known to buy Mattie gifts with her own money. According to several sources, Thompson gave Silks two severe beatings during their time together. When Mattie caught him in a compromising position with a rival madam, Lillie Dab, she threatened Dab with her pistol. Cortez took the pistol from her and beat her "unmercifully". Mattie filed for divorce, giving infidelity and abuse as her reasons. Cortez convinced her to drop the suit, which she did some weeks later. In 1898, the couple toured Great Britain and Alaska. Mattie opened a brothel during their three-month stay in Alaska. She made $38,000. Thompson became ill and died in April 1900.

== Death ==
Silks died in 1929 from complications due to a fall. Very few people attended her funeral. She was buried under the name Martha Ready, beside her longtime lover Cortez Thomson, in block 12-lot 31, of Fairmount Cemetery in Denver. Silks left $4,000 in real estate and $2,500 in jewels.
