= Stoiber-Reed-Humphreys Mansion =

Historic house in Colorado, United States

- Stoiber-Reed-Humphreys Mansion, within the Humboldt Street Historic District
- U.S. National Register of Historic Places
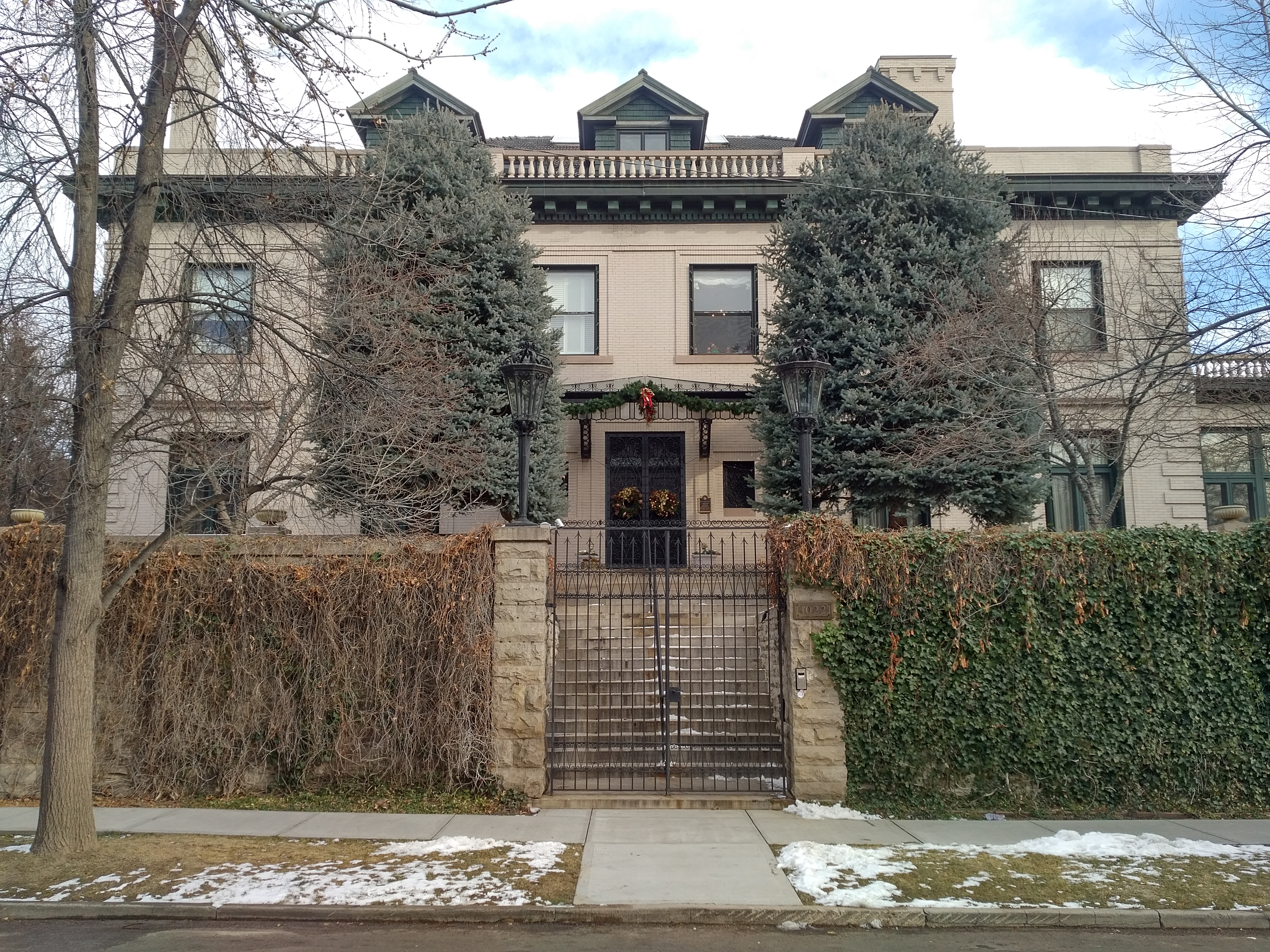
- Front entrance of Stoiber-Reed-Humphreys Mansion

- Location within Colorado
- Location: 1022 Humboldt Street, Denver, Colorado
- Coordinates: 39°43′57″N 104°58′09″W
- Built: 1907
- Architect: Marean and Norton
- Architectural style: Renaissance Revival
- NRHP reference No.: 78000848
- Added to NRHP: December 29, 1978

The Stoiber-Reed-Humphreys Mansion is located within the Humboldt Street Historic District in Denver, Colorado. The district was listed on the National Register of Historic Places on December 29, 1978. The mansion is considered "the largest and most imposing residence in the district."

== Stoiber Mansion ==
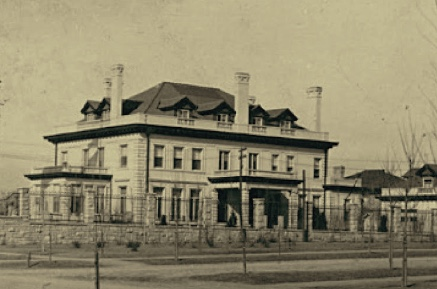
Stoiber Mansion, 1908, just after restoration of the basement swimming pool, third-floor dormers, and the bowling alley. Photograph by Charles S. Price, Denver Public Library

Stoiber Mansion, also called Stoiberhof, was built in 1907. The three-story Renaissance Revival house was designed by the Denver architectural firm Marean and Norton. The 30-room house was intended to be a social center, with a 50-foot entrance hall, a main-floor drawing room of 40 feet, and more than 16,000 square feet in total. The dining room can easily seat 50 people. There are nine bedrooms and nine baths. The house was built with a basement swimming pool, a bowling alley, and a barber shop. It also has an elevator to the second floor. On the exterior, there is a glass and metal canopy over the front door, as well as dormers and balustrades eaves.

The design for Stoiber Mansion is based upon drawings by Edward G. Stoiber, a German mining engineer and owner of the Silver Lake Mine in Silverton, Colorado. After he died in Paris, his wife Lena commissioned Albert J. Norton and Willis A. Marean to use the sketches to design the mansion. They were the architects for the Cheesman-Boettcher Mansion, now the Colorado Governor's Mansion, and other notable buildings in Denver. In 1909, Lena Stoiber married Hugh Rood, who died on the RMS Titanic. Rood was a wealthy businessman from Seattle.

== Verner Z. Reed ==
After her husband's death, Lena Stoiber Rood sold the house to Verner Z. Reed and his wife, Mary, who were philanthropists. Reed developed and owned Salt Creek oil fields in Wyoming. He was also a banker, mining man, and art collector. They had just returned from living abroad when they bought the mansion, where they frequently entertained.

After her husband's death, Mrs. Reed built a Tudor mansion at 475 Circle Drive in the Country Club Historic Neighborhood. Among her philanthropic pursuits, Mary Reed established the Margery Reed Mayo Day Nursery and the Mary Reed Library at the University of Denver.

== Albert and Ruth Humphreys ==
The house was sold to Albert and Ruth Boettcher Humphreys in 1920. Albert E. Humphreys was the vice president of Humphreys Engineering Company and the president of the Humphreys Gold Company. The daughter of Charles Boettcher, Ruth was a well-educated philanthropist and an early supporter of the Denver Art Museum. The couple raised their daughters, Charline and Ruth Augusta, in the mansion. They were members of an elite group in Denver called the "Sacred 36". Ruth died in 1959 and Albert married the widow of Henry C. Van Schaack. Albert died in 1968 and since then the mansion has had several owners.
