= Humboldt Street Historic District =

Historic district in Colorado, United States

- U.S. National Register of Historic Places
- U.S. Historic district
- Colorado State Register of Historic Properties
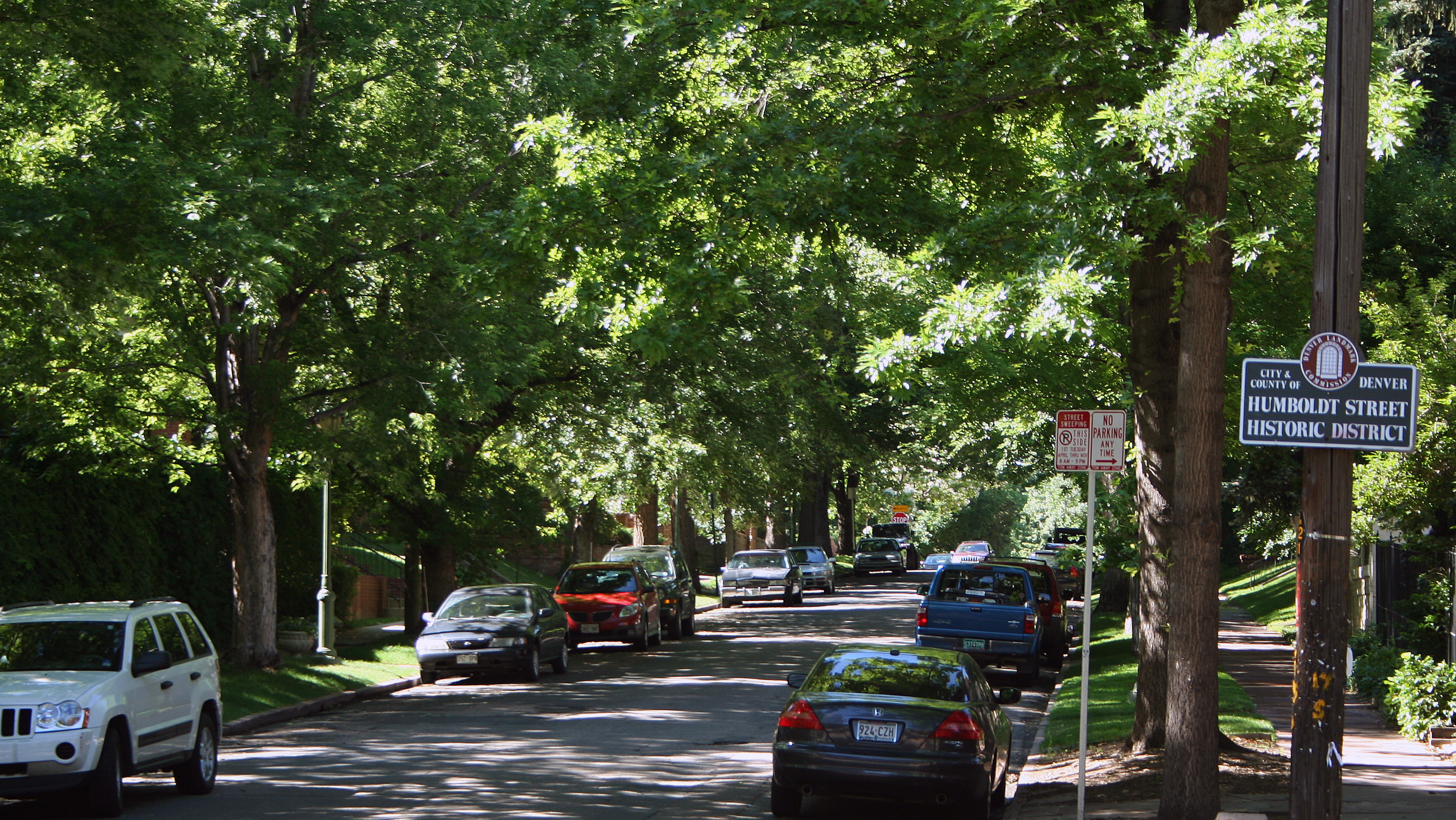
- Sign marking historic district

- Location within Colorado Location within the United States
- Location: Humboldt St. between E. 10th and E. 12th Sts., Denver, Colorado
- Coordinates: 39°44′1″N 104°58′7″W
- Area: 5 acres (2.0 ha)
- Built: 1895
- Architect: Multiple
- Architectural style: Mixed (more Than 2 Styles From Different Periods)
- NRHP reference No.: 78000848
- CSRHP No.: 5DV.166
- Added to NRHP: December 29, 1978

Humboldt Street Historic District, or Humboldt Island, is located west of Cheesman Park in Denver, Colorado on Humboldt Street between East Tenth and Twelfth Streets. It was the first residential district to be designated a historic district by the Denver Landmark Preservation Commission in 1972, and is listed as a historic district on the National Register of Historic Places.

There are 25 houses in the district built between 1895 and 1920. They were designed by prominent architectural firms, including Willison and Fallis, Marean and Norton, and Barressen Brothers. There district contains houses of Renaissance Revival, Georgian Revival, Colonial Revival as well as simple Foursquare style architecture. Some of Denver's most wealthy and influential people lived in the neighborhood.

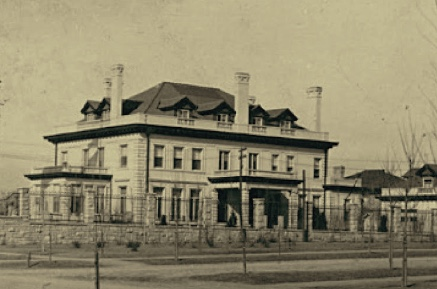
Stoiber Mansion, 1908, just after restoration of the basement swimming pool, third-floor dormers, and the bowling alley. Photograph by Charles S. Price, Denver Public Library

After Frederick G. Bonfils' mansion was torn down to make way for a fifteen-story apartment house, Denver passed an ordinated to protect Cheesman Park's mountain view from other high-rise buildings. Bonfils and Harry Heye Tammen were owners of The Denver Post and self-made millionaires. Tammen had a Tuscan villa at 1061 Humboldt. Mining millionaires, the Stoibers had the district's showiest mansion, Stoiber-Reed-Humphreys Mansion, of Renaissance Revival-style architecture. Governor William Ellery Sweet lived in a Georgian Revival-style house at 1075 Humboldt.

== Notable residents ==
- Frederick G. Bonfils
- Helen Bonfils
- May Bonfils Stanton
- Verner Zevola Reed
- William Ellery Sweet
- Josephine Trott
