= Baird College =

Women's college in Clinton, Missouri, US

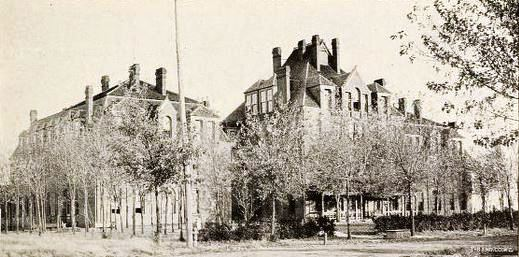

Baird College was a women's educational facility which was founded in Clinton, Missouri, in 1885 and operated for twelve years under the management of Priscilla Baird and her husband Homer. They closed the school in 1898, and though they tried to reopen with other management the following year, the plans did not come to fruition. In 1902 the school briefly opened as the Clinton College for Young Ladies, but closed after two years. From 1910 to 1925, the school was operated by the Seventh-day Adventist Church to train German-speaking ministers for immigrant congregations. The onset of World War I and the patriotism which ensued made the school obsolete, forcing its closure.

== Baird College ==
Baird College was a women's educational facility founded in 1885, opening on September 29 by Priscilla Baird and Homer T. Baird in Clinton, Missouri. The school was a non-sectarian Christian school. Baird and her husband had previously run a school at Hardin College until the semester ended in June, 1885. The Bairds spent $75,000 to complete the four-story building with three-story wings. There were 55 bedrooms and a total of 110 rooms, not counting the hallways and two large staircases. The façade was brick on a dressed-stone foundation. Many modern conveniences, including bathrooms on every floor, fire escapes, gas lighting, speaking tubes and electric bells, were provided for the students' comfort.

It was advertised as one of the strongest female colleges of the west and within 2 years of its opening boasted of having over 100 boarding students and 300 attendees, being taught elocution, languages, art and music. The school operated until 1897, under the direction of Baird and then was closed for the year of 1898. In 1899, one of the former teachers, was hired to act as president of the school. He claimed to have sole management of the school and solicited money from teachers under the guise of repaying them the advanced money for the lease. When it was discovered that he did not have a lease and had obtained the money under false pretenses, the school was closed.

== Clinton College for Young Ladies ==
Between 1902 and 1904, the school reopened as the Clinton College for Young Ladies.

== Clinton Theological Seminary ==
In 1910, the Seventh-day Adventist Church opened the Clinton German Seminary on the grounds and building of Baird College. The school had a grade school, secondary school and a junior college for the first four years of operation, but by 1915 was functioning as a senior college. Initially, the school directive was to teach German-speaking students to be ministers so that they could speak to German immigrant worshippers in their native tongue; however, with the advent of World War I a name change was deemed prudent by then president, Frank Isaac. The school name was changed in 1917 to the Clinton Theological Seminary. As the war continued, many congregations adopted English as their preferred worship language to show their patriotism and confirm that they had joined in their new society. As the need for German-speaking ministers declined, administrators questioned the need for the school, which competed for the same students as Union College in Lincoln, Nebraska. Two fires, one in 1924 and one the following year, sealed the decision for closure, as cost to repair the buildings could not be justified. The school was closed in 1925.

== Notable alumni ==
- Czarina Conlan
- Bertha M. Paxton, the first woman elected to the New Mexico Legislature.
