= Julia A. Tevis =

- 1860 portrait by Charles V. Bond
- Born: Julia Ann Hieronymous; December 5, 1799; Winchester, Clark County, Kentucky
- Died: April 21, 1880 (aged 80); Shelbyville, Shelby County, Kentucky
- Occupation: teacher
- Years active: 1819–79
- Known for: founding Science Hill Female Academy

Sixty years in a school-room

Julia A. Tevis (December 5, 1799 – April 21, 1880) was a pioneer educator of women, from Kentucky. After teaching for several years in Virginia, she founded the Science Hill Female Academy in Shelbyville and led the institution to gain a national reputation for excellence. Teaching her students math and science, rather than how to be accomplished seamstresses, Tevis prepared young women for colleges.

== Early life ==
Julia Ann Hieronymous was born on December 5, 1799, near Winchester, Clark County, Kentucky to Mary "Polly" (née Bush) and Pendleton Hieronymus. Her father's family were German Methodists, while her mother's family were English Baptists, and Hieronymous was the oldest daughter and second child in her family. Though she began her schooling in Clark County, studying with Mr. Pettichord, when she was seven years old, the Hieronymous family moved to Winchester, Virginia, as they felt schooling opportunities would be better. She attended the female academy there until 1813, when they moved again to the Georgetown neighborhood of Washington, D. C.

In Georgetown, Hieronymous studied drawing, embroidery, music and French with various private tutors. She enjoyed a privileged life, meeting dignitaries and attending festivities when Congress was in session. During the War of 1812, Hieronymous was barely able to flee during the British attack on Washington. In 1815, she entered a finishing school run by an Englishwoman, Mrs. Stone and graduated when she was nineteen years old. A business reversal of her father, required that Hieronymous earn her own living.

== Career ==
At twenty, Hieronymous began teaching at a school in Wytheville, Virginia. After teaching a little over a year in Wytheville, she moved to Washington County, Virginia, to teach the daughter of a general who lived in Abingdon. When her father died, Hieronymous brought her mother and sister to live with her and took on the responsibility for their care. She converted to Methodism and met a circuit rider, John Tevis, with whom she had a brief courtship. On March 9, 1824, Hieronymous and Tevis married and traveled to Kentucky on their honeymoon trip to see the property his parents had given them as a wedding gift. She convinced John to allow her to open a school in the home.

John was appointed to serve the Louisville Station and Tevis, who remained in Shelbyville founded the Science Hill Female Academy on March 25, 1825. In the early days of the school, the Methodist church helped with funding, but it was only nominally associated with the church. Tevis sought to teach her students to have a strong social conscience, but more importantly, she felt that women were as "capable of mastering the sciences as were young men". While daily attendance at chapel was a requirement, Tevis felt that chemistry and mathematics should take precedence over embroidery and sewing. Famous educators, speakers and writers of the period presented lectures as part of the lyceum circuit for the school and she taught history, math, rhetoric, science, and Latin All teachers she hired were required to have had a classical education and be proficient in languages.

Shortly before the school opened, Tevis gave birth to her first child. As she would with its six siblings, she continued working and simultaneously raising her family. A cholera epidemic in the 1830s nearly forced the closure of the school, but Tevis persevered and built the student body from its initial thirty-five pupils to 250 by 1857. Her husband John, had a stroke in 1857 and thereafter suffered from ill-health. He died on January 26, 1861, just prior to the beginning of the Civil War. Around the same time as her husband's death, Tevis' likeness was featured in the Nashville-based Home Circle newspaper's February 1861 issue. It is unknown if the engraving published in the Home Circle was taken from the portraits painted of the Tevises by Charles Bond, probably in 1860.

Tevis believed in the emancipation of slaves and was not a supporter of the Confederacy, which was shocking to her neighbors. As most of her students also came from Southern states, though she had pupils from throughout the country, her kindness and reputation allowed her to keep the school open during the conflict. Several students from Georgia, Louisiana and Mississippi, remained with her through the duration of the war without means to contact or return to their families. She cared for them as if they were her own children, until the war was over and normal travel was resumed.

In 1875, the school held its fifty-year reunion and alumni from three generations came to pay tribute to Tevis. Though she had begun relinquishing some of her duties, she continued to instruct Bible classes and chemistry. In 1878, Tevis published her autobiography, Sixty Years in a School-room. The following year, she sold Science Hill to Dr. Wiley Taul Poynter and on her birthday a large "founders celebration" was held in her honor at the school. It was attended by former students, teachers, local dignitaries and friends.

== Death and legacy ==
Tevis died on April 21, 1880, at Shelbyville, Kentucky and she was buried in the Grove Hill Cemetery of Shelbyville. The month after her death, her former students and children erected a cemetery marker to her memory. A statue in her honor was erected in 1885 in Shelbyville. The school Tevis founded maintained a reputation as one of the premier college preparatory schools of the South, training some 3,000 young women over its 114-year history until 1939.

In 1939, Rachel M. Varble published Julia Ann a work of juvenile fiction based on the diaries of Tevis. Tevis' private papers and those of Science Hill are housed at the Filson Historical Society in Louisville, Kentucky, and contain letters, papers and records of the school from its founding through 1975. The Filson Historical Society is also in possession of the portraits painted by Bond. In 1975 the school was placed on the National Register of Historic Places, because of its significance as both a school and a historical building.
