= Science Hill School (Shelbyville, Kentucky) =

- U.S. National Register of Historic Places
- U.S. Historic district
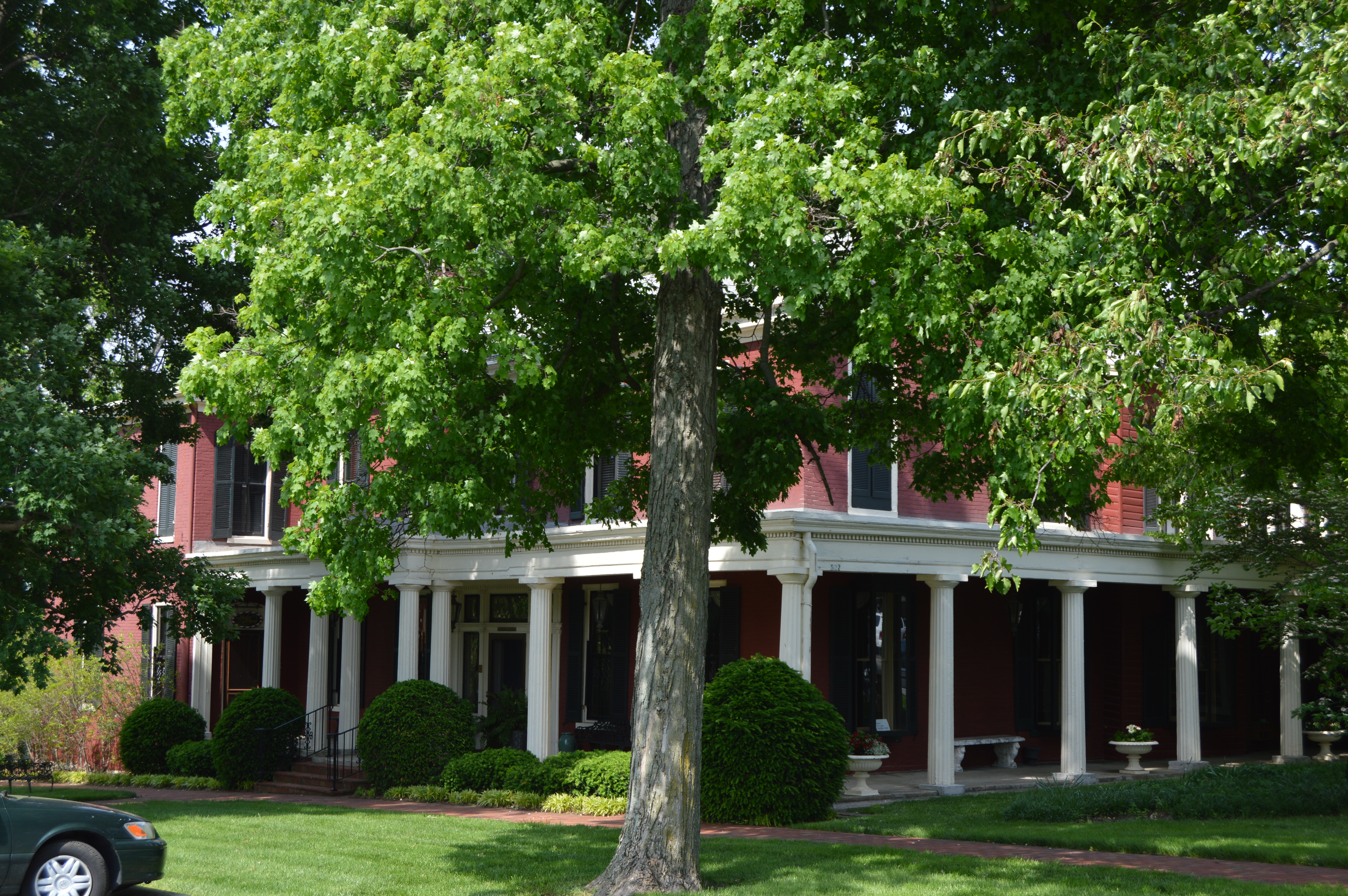
- Science Hill School in Shelbyville, main section with lawn

- Location within Kentucky Location within the United States
- Location: Washington St., Shelbyville, Kentucky
- Coordinates: 38°12′44″N 85°13′01″W
- Area: 5 acres (2.0 ha)
- Built: 1825
- Architect: Multiple
- NRHP reference No.: 75000831
- Added to NRHP: September 18, 1975

Science Hill School, originally known as the Science Hill Female Academy was founded on March 25, 1825, by Julia A. Tevis as a female preparatory school. In 1975 the school was placed on the National Register of Historic Places and in 1978, it was opened as a restaurant known as the Science Hill Inn by Donna Gill and Tim Barnes.

== History ==
On March 25, 1825, Julia A. Tevis founded the Science Hill Female Academy as a preparatory school for women. It was one of the first schools founded for girls west of the Allegheny Mountains and utilized the Lancastrian system, in which older or more advanced students taught the younger pupils. The school name derived from Tevis' belief that girls were as able to master the sciences as young men. Though she attracted students from throughout the country, the majority of her students were from wealthy Southern families. These aristocrats wanted their daughters to have social polishing and learn French, music and art. Tevis taught these traditional courses, but also taught her students history, math, rhetoric, science, and Latin.

In its early days, the school was funded by the Methodist Church, with which Tevis' husband, John, served as a missionary. The initial class had thirty-five pupils, of which six were boarders. Within twenty-five years, the class had grown to two hundred students with half of them boarding at the school. Its reputation was widely known and it had students from throughout the country as well as students who attended as a day school from the local community. A reunion of alumni was held in 1875 with three generations of the thousands of students who had been educated at the school in attendance.

Tevis operated the school until 1879, when she sold it to Wiley Taul Poynter, who operated the school as a secondary academy to prepare young women for further education at institutions such as Vassar, Wellesley and other well-known women's colleges. He and his descendants operated the school until 1939, when it closed due to financial constraints caused by the Great Depression. When it closed, Science Hill Academy had the distinction of being the oldest Protestant female academy in continuous operation in country, as well as in Kentucky.

When the school closed, the daughters of Dr. Poynter lived in the home and rented out the dorm rooms as apartments. The buildings were sold in the early 1950s to Mark J. Scearce, who renovated the former chapel as the Wakefield-Scearce Antique Gallery and continued utilizing the dormitories as apartments for let. In 1978, the former dining room was converted to a restaurant by Louisville restaurateur Tim Barnes, who opened it with chef, Donna Gill. Ellen Gill McCarty later became the chef of the restaurant which has become a focal point in Kentucky's culinary history.

== Architecture ==
The Tevises bought the two-story brick home, laid in Flemish bond, in 1825. Initially there were eight-rooms, which included a parlor, library, bedroom, central hallway on the ground floor, with a stairway leading to additional bedrooms on the upper floor. The school was begun in the library and in 1826, the Tevises added a wing extending east toward the back of the house as a dormitory. Teachers and students resided in the dormitory, which had a chapel on the ground floor and an outside stairway. The original style was of the Federalist period and featured wide ash floors with reeded doors and window treatments. The only room retaining these original features in the downstairs bedroom.

In the 1840s, during the Greek Revival Period the house was remodeled to reflect the tastes of the era and many of the mouldings were changed. The doors and windows featured crossette, or double-mitered ears, at the top of the lintel which was supported by side columns. A second wing was added in 1860 which housed a second dormitory and a northern extension between the house and dormitories adding a dining room, kitchen and pantries.

In 1861, the courtyard was enclosed by erecting an interior balcony supported by chamfered posts with dentilated moldings. Identical stairways, flanking the arched double-door leading to the chapel, ascended from the east end of the courtyard and connected to the second-story rooms. Light was provided by an octagonal windowed cupola centered in the roof of the courtyard.

In the 1880s, when the Poynters took over occupancy of the house, they remodeled the north side, adding a hall and two rooms. The relocated the stairway from the right side of the hall to the opposite side and opened the entrance hall to extend into a back hall. At the same time, the original entrance was replaced with a door featuring side-lights and a leaded-glass transom.

== Legacy ==
The papers of the school are housed at the Filson Historical Society in Louisville, Kentucky and contain letters, papers and records of the school from its founding through 1975. In 1975 the school was placed on the National Register of Historic Places, because of its significance as both a school and a historical building. Kentucky Educational Television featured the school in a 2007 broadcast for the program Kentucky Life. Since 1978, the facility has been operated as a restaurant known as the Science Hill Inn, which was opened by Donna Gill and Tim Barnes. It also houses the Wakefield-Scearce Galleries, an antique furniture and collectibles gallery.

In 2017, a Tudor-style, English pub named The Red Lion opened on the backside of the near 200 year-old Science Hill and Wakefield Scearce Galleries building. When the beloved, half-century-old iconic Science Hill Inn restaurant permanently closed during the pandemic, it was rebranded to The Red Lion at Science Hill. The Red Lion at Science Hill is owned by Brian and Kristin Grubb.

== Noted alumni ==
- Priscilla Baird
- Elizabeth Litchfield Cunnyngham (1831–1911), missionary and church worker
- Jeannette Howard Foster
