= 1927 United States House of Representatives elections =

- August 23, 1927 – November 15, 1927

5 (out of 435) seats in the United States House of Representatives 218 seats needed for a majority
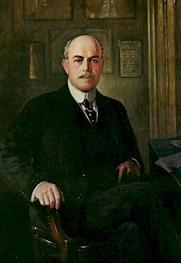

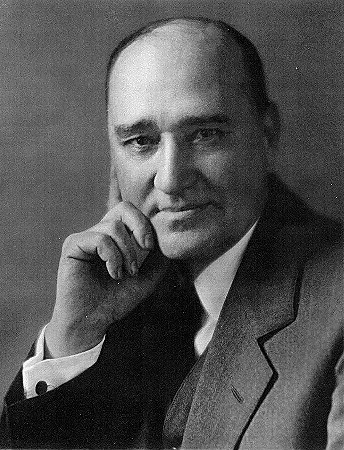
	Majority party	Minority party
Leader	Nicholas Longworth	Finis Garrett
Party	Republican	Democratic
Seat change	▼1	▲1
Seats up	4	1
Races won	3	2

There were five special elections to the United States House of Representatives in 1927 during the 70th United States Congress.

== List of elections ==
Elections are listed by date and district.

District	Incumbent			This race	
District	Member	Party	First elected	Results	Candidates
Louisiana 7	Ladislas Lazaro	Democratic	1912	Incumbent died March 30, 1927. New member elected August 23, 1927. Democratic hold.	▌ ✓ René L. De Rouen (Democratic); Unopposed
Oregon 3	Maurice E. Crumpacker	Republican	1924	Incumbent died July 24, 1927. New member elected October 18, 1927. Republican hold.	▌ ✓ Franklin F. Korell (Republican) 58.41%; ▌Elton Watkins (Independent Democrat) 41.59%
New York 35	Walter W. Magee	Republican	1914	Incumbent died May 25, 1927. New member elected November 8, 1927. Republican hold.	▌ ✓ Clarence E. Hancock (Republican) 68.95%; ▌Henry R. Brewster (Democratic) 29.50%; ▌John W. Hein (Socialist) 1.55%
Ohio 2	Ambrose E. B. Stephens	Republican	1918	Incumbent died February 12, 1927. New member elected November 8, 1927. Republican hold.	▌ ✓ Charles Tatgenhorst Jr. (Republican); ▌John C. Dempsey (Democratic); ▌Harry H. Shaffer (Ind. Republican) 22.39%
Pennsylvania 1	James M. Hazlett	Republican	1926	Incumbent resigned October 20, 1927. New member elected November 8, 1927. Republican hold.	▌ ✓ James M. Beck (Republican) 96.06%; ▌J. P. Muhrenan (Unknown) 3.94%
Colorado 1	William N. Vaile	Republican	1918	Incumbent died July 2, 1927. New member elected November 15, 1927. Democratic gain.	▌ ✓ S. Harrison White (Democratic) 51.52%; ▌Francis J. Knauss (Republican) 43.97%; ▌George John Kindel (Independent) 4.09%

== See also ==
- 69th United States Congress
- 70th United States Congress
