= Colorado's 1st congressional district =

U.S. House district for Colorado

Coordinates: 39°43′56″N 104°54′32″W

- Interactive map of district boundaries since January 3, 2023
- Representative: Diana DeGette; D–Denver
- Distribution: 100% urban; 0% rural
- Population (2025): 749,613
- Median household income: $93,721
- Ethnicity: 54.4% White; 27.8% Hispanic; 8.5% Black; 4.2% Two or more races; 3.8% Asian; 1.2% other
- Cook PVI: D+29

Colorado's 1st congressional district is a congressional district in the U.S. state of Colorado, based primarily in the City and County of Denver in the central part of the state. It has been represented by Democrat Diana DeGette since 1997. The district includes almost all of the City and County of Denver, and the Denver enclaves of Glendale and Holly Hills. A small portion of the City and County of Denver near Four Square Mile is located in Colorado's 6th congressional district.

An urban and diverse district based in the heart of Metropolitan Denver, and with a Cook Partisan Voting Index rating of D+29, it is the most Democratic district in both Colorado and the Mountain West. Only two Republicans have been elected to the seat since the Great Depression: Dean M. Gillespie was the district's representative from 1944 to 1947; and Mike McKevitt from 1971 to 1973, winning thanks to an ideological split among Denver Democrats. No Republican has even notched 30% of the vote in the district after 1998.

== History ==
=== 1990s ===
Following the 1990 United States census and consequential redrawing of Colorado's congressional districts, the 1st congressional district consisted of all of the City and County of Denver and parts of Adams, Arapahoe, and Jefferson counties.

=== 2000s ===
Following the 2000 United States census and consequential redistricting of Colorado's congressional districts, the 1st congressional district consisted of all of the City and County of Denver and parts of Arapahoe County, including parts or all of the cities of Englewood, Cherry Hills Village, Sheridan, Aurora, and Glendale.

=== 2010s ===
Following the 2010 United States census and consequential redistricting of Colorado's congressional districts, the 1st congressional district consisted of all of the City and County of Denver and parts of Arapahoe County including parts or all of the cities of Englewood, Cherry Hills Village, Sheridan, Aurora, and Glendale. The 1st district also took in additional area in the southwestern suburbs which included parts of Jefferson County and the CDPs of Columbine and Ken Caryl.

=== 2020s ===
Following the 2020 United States census and consequential redistricting of Colorado's congressional districts, the 1st congressional district consisted of all of the City and County of Denver and parts of Arapahoe County that are enclaves within the Denver city borders such as Glendale and Holly Hills: the Jefferson County portions were moved to the 7th District, while the southern Arapahoe County suburbs were moved to the Aurora-based 6th District.

== Composition ==
For the 118th and successive Congresses (based on redistricting following the 2020 census), the district contains all or portions of the following counties and communities:

Arapahoe County (2)

Glendale, Holly Hills

Denver County (1)

Denver (part; also 6th)

== Recent election results from statewide races ==
Year	Office	Results
2008	President	Obama 75% - 23%
2008	Senate	Udall 73% - 23%
2010	Senate	Bennet 71% - 24%
2010	Governor	Hickenlooper 74% - 4%
2010	Secretary of State	Buescher 68% - 27%
2010	Treasurer	Kennedy 73% - 27%
2010	Attorney General	Garnett 67% - 33%
2012	President	Obama 75% - 25%
2014	Senate	Udall 70% - 25%
2016	President	Clinton 74% - 19%
2016	Senate	Bennet 73% - 22%
2018	Governor	Polis 77% - 20%
2018	Attorney General	Weiser 76% - 21%
2020	President	Biden 80% - 18%
2020	Senate	Hickenlooper 78% - 20%
2022	Senate	Bennet 80% - 18%
2022	Governor	Polis 82% - 16%
2022	Secretary of State	Griswold 78% - 19%
2022	Treasurer	Young 77% - 20%
2022	Attorney General	Weiser 79% - 19%
2024	President	Harris 77% - 21%

== List of members representing the district ==
Member	Party	Years	Cong ress(es)	Electoral history	District location
District created March 4, 1893
Lafayette Pence (Denver)	Populist	March 4, 1893 – March 3, 1895	53rd	Elected in 1892. Lost re-election.	1893–1915; Adams, Arapahoe, Boulder, Denver, Jackson, Jefferson, Lake, Larimer, Logan, Morgan, Park, Phillips, Sedgwick, Washington, Weld, and Yuma
John F. Shafroth (Denver)	Republican	March 4, 1895 – March 3, 1897	54th 55th 56th 57th 58th	Elected in 1894. Changed parties and re-elected in 1896. Re-elected in 1898. Re-elected in 1900. Changed parties and re-elected in 1902. Resigned amid election contest.	1893–1915; Adams, Arapahoe, Boulder, Denver, Jackson, Jefferson, Lake, Larimer, Logan, Morgan, Park, Phillips, Sedgwick, Washington, Weld, and Yuma
John F. Shafroth (Denver)	Silver Republican	March 4, 1897 – March 3, 1903	54th 55th 56th 57th 58th	Elected in 1894. Changed parties and re-elected in 1896. Re-elected in 1898. Re-elected in 1900. Changed parties and re-elected in 1902. Resigned amid election contest.	1893–1915; Adams, Arapahoe, Boulder, Denver, Jackson, Jefferson, Lake, Larimer, Logan, Morgan, Park, Phillips, Sedgwick, Washington, Weld, and Yuma
John F. Shafroth (Denver)	Democratic	March 4, 1903 – February 15, 1904	54th 55th 56th 57th 58th	Elected in 1894. Changed parties and re-elected in 1896. Re-elected in 1898. Re-elected in 1900. Changed parties and re-elected in 1902. Resigned amid election contest.	1893–1915; Adams, Arapahoe, Boulder, Denver, Jackson, Jefferson, Lake, Larimer, Logan, Morgan, Park, Phillips, Sedgwick, Washington, Weld, and Yuma
Robert W. Bonynge (Denver)	Republican	February 16, 1904 – March 3, 1909	58th 59th 60th	Won election contest. Re-elected in 1904. Re-elected in 1906. Lost re-election.	1893–1915; Adams, Arapahoe, Boulder, Denver, Jackson, Jefferson, Lake, Larimer, Logan, Morgan, Park, Phillips, Sedgwick, Washington, Weld, and Yuma
Atterson W. Rucker (Fort Logan)	Democratic	March 4, 1909 – March 3, 1913	61st 62nd	Elected in 1908. Re-elected in 1910. Lost renomination.	1893–1915; Adams, Arapahoe, Boulder, Denver, Jackson, Jefferson, Lake, Larimer, Logan, Morgan, Park, Phillips, Sedgwick, Washington, Weld, and Yuma
George Kindel (Denver)	Democratic	March 4, 1913 – March 3, 1915	63rd	Elected in 1912. Retired to run for U.S. senator.	1893–1915; Adams, Arapahoe, Boulder, Denver, Jackson, Jefferson, Lake, Larimer, Logan, Morgan, Park, Phillips, Sedgwick, Washington, Weld, and Yuma
Benjamin Hilliard (Denver)	Democratic	March 4, 1915 – March 3, 1919	64th 65th	Elected in 1914. Re-elected in 1916. Lost re-election.	1915–1923 [data missing]
William Vaile (Denver)	Republican	March 4, 1919 – July 2, 1927	66th 67th 68th 69th 70th	Elected in 1918. Re-elected in 1920. Re-elected in 1922. Re-elected in 1924. Re-elected in 1926. Died.	1915–1923 [data missing]
William Vaile (Denver)	Republican	March 4, 1919 – July 2, 1927	66th 67th 68th 69th 70th	Elected in 1918. Re-elected in 1920. Re-elected in 1922. Re-elected in 1924. Re-elected in 1926. Died.	1923–1965 [data missing]
Vacant		July 2, 1927 – November 15, 1927	70th		1923–1965 [data missing]
S. Harrison White (Denver)	Democratic	November 15, 1927 – March 3, 1929	70th	Elected to finish Vaile's term. Lost re-election.	1923–1965 [data missing]
William R. Eaton (Denver)	Republican	March 4, 1929 – March 3, 1933	71st 72nd	Elected in 1928. Re-elected in 1930. Lost re-election.	1923–1965 [data missing]
Lawrence Lewis (Denver)	Democratic	March 4, 1933 – December 9, 1943	73rd 74th 75th 76th 77th 78th	Elected in 1932. Re-elected in 1934. Re-elected in 1936. Re-elected in 1938. Re-elected in 1940. Re-elected in 1942. Died.	1923–1965 [data missing]
Vacant		December 9, 1943 – March 7, 1944	78th		1923–1965 [data missing]
Dean M. Gillespie (Denver)	Republican	March 7, 1944 – January 3, 1947	78th 79th	Elected to finish Lewis's term. Re-elected later in 1944. Lost re-election.	1923–1965 [data missing]
John A. Carroll (Denver)	Democratic	January 3, 1947 – January 3, 1951	80th 81st	Elected in 1946. Re-elected in 1948. Retired to run for U.S. senator.	1923–1965 [data missing]
Byron Rogers (Denver)	Democratic	January 3, 1951 – January 3, 1971	82nd 83rd 84th 85th 86th 87th 88th 89th 90th 91st	Elected in 1950. Re-elected in 1952. Re-elected in 1954. Re-elected in 1956. Re-elected in 1958. Re-elected in 1960. Re-elected in 1962. Re-elected in 1964. Re-elected in 1966. Re-elected in 1968. Lost renomination.	1923–1965 [data missing]
Byron Rogers (Denver)	Democratic	January 3, 1951 – January 3, 1971	82nd 83rd 84th 85th 86th 87th 88th 89th 90th 91st	Elected in 1950. Re-elected in 1952. Re-elected in 1954. Re-elected in 1956. Re-elected in 1958. Re-elected in 1960. Re-elected in 1962. Re-elected in 1964. Re-elected in 1966. Re-elected in 1968. Lost renomination.	1965–1973 [data missing]
Mike McKevitt (Denver)	Republican	January 3, 1971 – January 3, 1973	92nd	Elected in 1970. Lost re-election.	1965–1973 [data missing]
Pat Schroeder (Denver)	Democratic	January 3, 1973 – January 3, 1997	93rd 94th 95th 96th 97th 98th 99th 100th 101st 102nd 103rd 104th	Elected in 1972. Re-elected in 1974. Re-elected in 1976. Re-elected in 1978. Re-elected in 1980. Re-elected in 1982. Re-elected in 1984. Re-elected in 1986. Re-elected in 1988. Re-elected in 1990. Re-elected in 1992. Re-elected in 1994. Retired.	1973–1983; Parts of Arapahoe and Denver
Pat Schroeder (Denver)	Democratic	January 3, 1973 – January 3, 1997	93rd 94th 95th 96th 97th 98th 99th 100th 101st 102nd 103rd 104th	Elected in 1972. Re-elected in 1974. Re-elected in 1976. Re-elected in 1978. Re-elected in 1980. Re-elected in 1982. Re-elected in 1984. Re-elected in 1986. Re-elected in 1988. Re-elected in 1990. Re-elected in 1992. Re-elected in 1994. Retired.	1983–1993; Parts of Arapahoe and Denver
Pat Schroeder (Denver)	Democratic	January 3, 1973 – January 3, 1997	93rd 94th 95th 96th 97th 98th 99th 100th 101st 102nd 103rd 104th	Elected in 1972. Re-elected in 1974. Re-elected in 1976. Re-elected in 1978. Re-elected in 1980. Re-elected in 1982. Re-elected in 1984. Re-elected in 1986. Re-elected in 1988. Re-elected in 1990. Re-elected in 1992. Re-elected in 1994. Retired.	1993–2003; Denver; parts of Adams and Arapahoe
Diana DeGette (Denver)	Democratic	January 3, 1997 – present	105th 106th 107th 108th 109th 110th 111th 112th 113th 114th 115th 116th 117th 118th 119th	Elected in 1996. Re-elected in 1998. Re-elected in 2000. Re-elected in 2002. Re-elected in 2004. Re-elected in 2006. Re-elected in 2008. Re-elected in 2010. Re-elected in 2012. Re-elected in 2014. Re-elected in 2016. Re-elected in 2018. Re-elected in 2020. Re-elected in 2022. Re-elected in 2024. Lost renomination.	1993–2003; Denver; parts of Adams and Arapahoe
Diana DeGette (Denver)	Democratic	January 3, 1997 – present	105th 106th 107th 108th 109th 110th 111th 112th 113th 114th 115th 116th 117th 118th 119th	Elected in 1996. Re-elected in 1998. Re-elected in 2000. Re-elected in 2002. Re-elected in 2004. Re-elected in 2006. Re-elected in 2008. Re-elected in 2010. Re-elected in 2012. Re-elected in 2014. Re-elected in 2016. Re-elected in 2018. Re-elected in 2020. Re-elected in 2022. Re-elected in 2024. Lost renomination.	2003–2013 Denver; parts of Arapahoe
Diana DeGette (Denver)	Democratic	January 3, 1997 – present	105th 106th 107th 108th 109th 110th 111th 112th 113th 114th 115th 116th 117th 118th 119th	Elected in 1996. Re-elected in 1998. Re-elected in 2000. Re-elected in 2002. Re-elected in 2004. Re-elected in 2006. Re-elected in 2008. Re-elected in 2010. Re-elected in 2012. Re-elected in 2014. Re-elected in 2016. Re-elected in 2018. Re-elected in 2020. Re-elected in 2022. Re-elected in 2024. Lost renomination.	2013–2023 Denver; parts of Arapahoe and Jefferson
Diana DeGette (Denver)	Democratic	January 3, 1997 – present	105th 106th 107th 108th 109th 110th 111th 112th 113th 114th 115th 116th 117th 118th 119th	Elected in 1996. Re-elected in 1998. Re-elected in 2000. Re-elected in 2002. Re-elected in 2004. Re-elected in 2006. Re-elected in 2008. Re-elected in 2010. Re-elected in 2012. Re-elected in 2014. Re-elected in 2016. Re-elected in 2018. Re-elected in 2020. Re-elected in 2022. Re-elected in 2024. Lost renomination.	2023–present Parts of Denver; parts of Arapahoe (enclaves only)
Melat Kiros (elect) (Denver)	Democratic	Taking office January 3, 2027		Elected in 2026.	2023–present Parts of Denver; parts of Arapahoe (enclaves only)

== Election results ==
=== 1892 ===
1892 United States House of Representatives elections, Colorado's 1st district
Party	Candidate	Votes	%
Populist	Lafayette Pence	20,004	49.11%
Republican	Earl B. Coe	17,609	43.23%
Democratic	John G. Taylor	2,240	5.50%
Prohibition	W.G. Sprague	876	2.15%
Majority		2,395	5.88%
Total votes		40,729	100%
Populist gain from new seat			

=== 1894 ===
1894 United States House of Representatives elections, Colorado's 1st district
Party	Candidate	Votes	%
Republican	John F. Shafroth	47,710	55.32%
Populist	Lafayette Pence (incumbent)	34,223	39.68%
Prohibition	Robert H. Rhodes	2,465	2.86%
Democratic	John T. Bottom	1,847	2.14%
Majority		13,487	15.64%
Total votes		86,245	100%
Republican gain from Populist			

=== 1896 ===
1896 United States House of Representatives elections, Colorado's 1st district
Party	Candidate	Votes	%
Silver Republican	John F. Shafroth (incumbent)	67,821	84.89%
Republican	T.E. McClelland	9,625	12.05%
Natural Prohibition	J.J. Losh	1,083	1.36%
Prohibition	W.T. Steele	1,006	1.26%
National	Dayton O. Gilbert	181	0.23%
Socialist Labor	William Dye	173	0.22%
Majority		58,196	72.84%
Total votes		79,889	100%
Silver Republican hold			

=== 1898 ===
1898 United States House of Representatives elections, Colorado's 1st district
Party	Candidate	Votes	%
Silver Republican	John F. Shafroth (incumbent)	43,111	67.61%
Republican	Charles Hartsell	18,580	29.14%
Prohibition	Dayton O. Gilbert	1,410	2.21%
Socialist Labor	Nathan L. Griest	667	1.05%
Majority		24,531	38.47%
Total votes		63,768	100%
Silver Republican hold			

=== 1900 ===
1900 United States House of Representatives elections, Colorado's 1st district
Party	Candidate	Votes	%
Silver Republican	John F. Shafroth (incumbent)	54,591	55.32%
Republican	Robert W. Bonynge	41,518	42.07%
Prohibition	S.H. Shellenger	1,924	1.95%
Socialist Labor	Joseph Smith	326	0.33%
Social Democratic	Charles M. Davis	320	0.32%
Majority		13,073	13.25%
Total votes		98,679	100%
Silver Republican hold			

=== 1902 ===
1902 United States House of Representatives elections, Colorado's 1st district
Party	Candidate	Votes	%
Democratic	John F. Shafroth (incumbent)	41,440	48.98%
Republican	Robert W. Bonynge	38,648	45.68%
Socialist	Marshall DeWitt	2,680	3.17%
Prohibition	Franklin Moore	1,832	2.17%
Majority		2,792	3.30%
Total votes		84,600	100%
Democratic hold			

=== 1904 ===
1904 United States House of Representatives elections, Colorado's 1st district
Party	Candidate	Votes	%
Republican	Robert W. Bonynge (incumbent)	55,940	51.74%
Democratic	Clay B. Whitford	50,022	46.27%
Prohibition	William C. Johnston	2,153	1.99%
Majority		5,918	5.47%
Total votes		108,115	100%
Republican hold			

=== 1906 ===
1906 United States House of Representatives elections, Colorado's 1st district
Party	Candidate	Votes	%
Republican	Robert W. Bonynge (incumbent)	47,549	55.48%
Democratic	Charles F. Tew	31,133	36.32%
Socialist	Luella Twining	4,989	5.82%
Prohibition	E.E. Evans	2,039	2.38%
Majority		16,416	19.16%
Total votes		85,710	100%
Republican hold			

=== 1908 ===
1908 United States House of Representatives elections, Colorado's 1st district
Party	Candidate	Votes	%
Democratic	Atterson W. Rucker	60,643	49.87%
Republican	Robert W. Bonynge (incumbent)	57,597	47.37%
Socialist	S.S. Greear	3,356	2.76%
Majority		3,046	2.50%
Total votes		121,596	100%
Democratic gain from Republican			

=== 1910 ===
1910 United States House of Representatives elections, Colorado's 1st district
Party	Candidate	Votes	%
Democratic	Atterson W. Rucker (incumbent)	40,458	40.77%
Republican	James C. Burger	37,966	38.26%
Prohibition	George John Kindel	17,144	17.28%
Socialist	John W. Martin	3,661	3.69%
Majority		2,492	2.51%
Total votes		99,229	100%
Democratic hold			

=== 1912 ===
1912 United States House of Representatives elections, Colorado's 1st district
Party	Candidate	Votes	%
Democratic	George John Kindel	54,504	45.84%
Progressive	W. J. Crank	30,121	25.33%
Republican	Rice W. Means	24,887	20.93%
Socialist	John W. Martin	6,757	5.68%
Prohibition	Otto A. Reinhardt	2,642	2.22%
Majority		24,383	20.51%
Total votes		118,911	100%
Democratic hold			

=== 1914 ===
1914 United States House of Representatives elections, Colorado's 1st district
Party	Candidate	Votes	%
Democratic	Benjamin Hilliard	26,169	40.56%
Republican	Horace F. Phelps	21,569	33.43%
Progressive	Archibald A. Lee	8,729	13.53%
Independent	Atterson W. Rucker	5,445	8.44%
Socialist	Benjamin Blumenberg	2,612	4.05%
Majority		4,600	7.13%
Total votes		64,524	100%
Democratic hold			

=== 1916 ===
1916 United States House of Representatives elections, Colorado's 1st district
Party	Candidate	Votes	%
Democratic	Benjamin Hilliard (incumbent)	30,146	48.53%
Republican	William N. Vaile	26,121	42.05%
Liberal	George John Kindel	3,306	5.32%
Socialist	Charles A. Ahlstrom	2,551	4.11%
Majority		4,025	6.48%
Total votes		62,124	100%
Democratic hold			

=== 1918 ===
1918 United States House of Representatives elections, Colorado's 1st district
Party	Candidate	Votes	%
Republican	William N. Vaile	27,815	54.19%
Democratic	John L. Stack	16,364	31.88%
Independent	Benjamin Hilliard (incumbent)	6,112	11.91%
Socialist	Fred Underhill	1,039	2.02%
Majority		11,451	22.31%
Total votes		51,330	100%
Republican gain from Democratic			

=== 1920 ===
1920 United States House of Representatives elections, Colorado's 1st district
Party	Candidate	Votes	%
Republican	William N. Vaile (incumbent)	45,658	66.93%
Democratic	Benjamin Hilliard	22,557	33.07%
Majority		23,101	33.86%
Total votes		68,215	100%
Republican hold			

=== 1922 ===
1922 United States House of Representatives elections, Colorado's 1st district
Party	Candidate	Votes	%
Republican	William N. Vaile (incumbent)	32,939	55.48%
Democratic	Benjamin Hilliard	25,477	42.91%
Farmer–Labor	Hattie K. Howard	959	1.62%
Majority		7,462	12.57%
Total votes		59,375	100%
Republican hold			

=== 1924 ===
1924 United States House of Representatives elections, Colorado's 1st district
Party	Candidate	Votes	%
Republican	William N. Vaile (incumbent)	47,155	54.19%
Democratic	James G. Edgeworth	36,519	41.97%
Farmer–Labor	Thomas O. Spacey	2,686	3.09%
Workers	Louis A. Zetlin	654	0.75%
Majority		10,636	12.22%
Total votes		87,014	100%
Republican hold			

=== 1926 ===
1926 United States House of Representatives elections, Colorado's 1st district
Party	Candidate	Votes	%
Republican	William N. Vaile (incumbent)	39,909	54.86%
Democratic	Benjamin Hilliard	30,337	41.70%
Farmer–Labor	Isaac Dunn	1,972	2.71%
Socialist	Clyde Robinson	530	0.73%
Majority		9,572	13.16%
Total votes		72,748	100%
Republican hold			

=== 1927 (special) ===
1927 United States House of Representatives special election, Colorado's 1st district
Party	Candidate	Votes	%
Democratic	S. Harrison White	32,171	51.52%
Republican	Francis J. Knauss	27,456	43.97%
Independent	George John Kindel	2,556	4.09%
Farmer–Labor	Huston Hugh Marrs	261	0.42%
Majority		4,715	7.55%
Total votes		62,444	100%
Democratic gain from Republican			

=== 1928 ===
1928 United States House of Representatives elections, Colorado's 1st district
Party	Candidate	Votes	%
Republican	William R. Eaton	63,258	58.08%
Democratic	S. Harrison White (incumbent)	44,713	41.05%
Workers	William R. Dietrich	949	0.87%
Majority		18,545	17.03%
Total votes		108,920	100%
Republican gain from Democratic			

=== 1930 ===
1930 United States House of Representatives elections, Colorado's 1st district
Party	Candidate	Votes	%
Republican	William R. Eaton (incumbent)	39,907	50.33%
Democratic	Lawrence Lewis	38,152	48.12%
Farmer–Labor	W.R. Duke	813	1.03%
Communist	Louis A. Zeitlin	411	0.52%
Majority		1,755	2.21%
Total votes		79,283	100%
Republican hold			

=== 1932 ===
1932 United States House of Representatives elections, Colorado's 1st district
Party	Candidate	Votes	%
Democratic	Lawrence Lewis	70,826	54.41%
Republican	William R. Eaton (incumbent)	56,601	43.49%
Socialist	Bruce Lamont	1,926	1.48%
Communist	Charles Guynn	422	0.32%
Farmer–Labor	W. R. Duke	385	0.30%
Majority		14,225	10.92%
Total votes		130,160	100%
Democratic gain from Republican			

=== 1934 ===
1934 United States House of Representatives elections, Colorado's 1st district
Party	Candidate	Votes	%
Democratic	Lawrence Lewis (incumbent)	59,744	56.04%
Republican	William R. Eaton	34,073	31.96%
Old Age Pension	Charles W. Varnum	9,511	8.92%
Socialist	Carle Whitehead	2,540	2.38%
Communist	George Bardwell	743	0.70%
Majority		25,671	24.08%
Total votes		106,611	100%
Democratic hold			

=== 1936 ===
1936 United States House of Representatives elections, Colorado's 1st district
Party	Candidate	Votes	%
Democratic	Lawrence Lewis (incumbent)	100,704	68.96%
Republican	Harry Zimmerhackel	41,574	28.47%
Farmer–Labor	Louella Grant Shirley	2,675	1.83%
Socialist	F. S. Kidneigh	1,073	0.73%
Majority		59,130	40.49%
Total votes		146,026	100%
Democratic hold			

=== 1938 ===
1938 United States House of Representatives elections, Colorado's 1st district
Party	Candidate	Votes	%
Democratic	Lawrence Lewis (incumbent)	83,517	65.31%
Republican	William I. Reilly	42,758	33.44%
Socialist	Edgar P. Sherman	913	0.71%
Prohibition	Oliver L. Barnes	688	0.54%
Majority		40,759	31.87%
Total votes		127,876	100%
Democratic hold			

=== 1940 ===
1940 United States House of Representatives elections, Colorado's 1st district
Party	Candidate	Votes	%
Democratic	Lawrence Lewis (incumbent)	110,078	64.72%
Republican	James D. Parriott	59,427	34.94%
Socialist	Ward Rogers	577	0.34%
Majority		50,651	29.78%
Total votes		170,082	100%
Democratic hold			

=== 1942 ===
1942 United States House of Representatives elections, Colorado's 1st district
Party	Candidate	Votes	%
Democratic	Lawrence Lewis (incumbent)	58,143	53.39%
Republican	Olaf H. Jacobson	50,083	45.99%
Socialist	Ward Rogers	681	0.63%
Majority		8,060	7.40%
Total votes		108,907	100%
Democratic hold			

=== 1944 (special) ===
1944 United States House of Representatives special election, Colorado's 1st district
Party	Candidate	Votes	%
Republican	Dean M. Gillespie	41,319	51.55%
Democratic	Carl E. Wuertele	38,394	47.90%
Socialist	Edgar P. Sherman	230	0.29%
Independent	George M. Phillips	160	0.20%
Liberal	Frank H. Rice	51	0.06%
Majority		2,925	3.65%
Total votes		80,154	100%
Republican gain from Democratic			

=== 1944 (general) ===
1944 United States House of Representatives elections, Colorado's 1st district (general)
Party	Candidate	Votes	%
Republican	Dean M. Gillespie (incumbent)	90,151	51.75%
Democratic	Charles A. Graham	83,253	47.79%
Socialist	Edgar P. Sherman	798	0.46%
Majority		6,898	3.96%
Total votes		174,202	100%
Republican hold			

=== 1946 ===
1946 United States House of Representatives elections, Colorado's 1st district
Party	Candidate	Votes	%
Democratic	John A. Carroll	60,513	51.75%
Republican	Dean M. Gillespie (incumbent)	55,724	47.66%
Socialist	Edgar P. Sherman	691	0.59%
Majority		4,789	4.09%
Total votes		116,928	100%
Democratic gain from Republican			

=== 1948 ===
1948 United States House of Representatives elections, Colorado's 1st district
Party	Candidate	Votes	%
Democratic	John A. Carroll (incumbent)	106,096	64.84%
Republican	Christopher F. Cusack	57,541	35.16%
Majority		48,555	29.68%
Total votes		163,637	100%
Democratic hold			

=== 1950 ===
1950 United States House of Representatives elections, Colorado's 1st district
Party	Candidate	Votes	%
Democratic	Byron G. Rogers	70,165	50.31%
Republican	Richard G. Luxford	67,436	48.35%
Independent	Tillman H. Eeb	1,287	0.92%
Socialist	Carle Whitehead	585	0.42%
Majority		2,729	1.96%
Total votes		139,473	100%
Democratic hold			

=== 1952 ===
1952 United States House of Representatives elections, Colorado's 1st district
Party	Candidate	Votes	%
Democratic	Byron G. Rogers (incumbent)	101,864	50.78%
Republican	Mason K. Knuckles	97,442	48.57%
Socialist	Carle Whitehead	1,307	0.65%
Majority		4,422	2.21%
Total votes		200,613	100%
Democratic hold			

=== 1954 ===
1954 United States House of Representatives elections, Colorado's 1st district
Party	Candidate	Votes	%
Democratic	Byron G. Rogers (incumbent)	84,745	55.62%
Republican	Ellen G. Harris	67,210	44.11%
Socialist	Carle Whitehead	415	0.27%
Majority		17,535	11.51%
Total votes		152,370	100%
Democratic hold			

=== 1956 ===
1956 United States House of Representatives elections, Colorado's 1st district
Party	Candidate	Votes	%
Democratic	Byron G. Rogers (incumbent)	116,487	57.78%
Republican	Robert S. McCollum	85,127	42.22%
Majority		31,360	15.56%
Total votes		201,614	100%
Democratic hold			

=== 1958 ===
1958 United States House of Representatives elections, Colorado's 1st district
Party	Candidate	Votes	%
Democratic	Byron G. Rogers (incumbent)	107,567	66.66%
Republican	John L. Harpel	53,801	33.34%
Majority		53,766	33.32%
Total votes		161,368	100%
Democratic hold			

=== 1960 ===
1960 United States House of Representatives elections, Colorado's 1st district
Party	Candidate	Votes	%
Democratic	Byron G. Rogers (incumbent)	121,610	60.01%
Republican	Robert D. Rolander	81,042	39.99%
Majority		40,568	20.02%
Total votes		202,652	100%
Democratic hold			

=== 1962 ===
1962 United States House of Representatives elections, Colorado's 1st district
Party	Candidate	Votes	%
Democratic	Byron G. Rogers (incumbent)	94,680	56.00%
Republican	William B. Chenoweth	74,392	44.00%
Majority		20,288	12.00%
Total votes		169,072	100%
Democratic hold			

=== 1964 ===
1964 United States House of Representatives elections, Colorado's 1st district
Party	Candidate	Votes	%
Democratic	Byron G. Rogers (incumbent)	138,475	67.52%
Republican	Glenn R. Jones	65,423	31.90%
Socialist Workers	Allen D. Taplin	1,183	0.58%
Majority		73,052	35.62%
Total votes		205,081	100%
Democratic hold			

=== 1966 ===
1966 United States House of Representatives elections, Colorado's 1st district
Party	Candidate	Votes	%
Democratic	Byron G. Rogers (incumbent)	92,688	56.03%
Republican	Greg Perason	72,732	43.97%
Majority		19,956	12.06%
Total votes		165,420	100%
Democratic hold			

=== 1968 ===
1968 United States House of Representatives elections, Colorado's 1st district
Party	Candidate	Votes	%
Democratic	Byron G. Rogers (incumbent)	91,199	45.74%
Republican	Frank A. Kemp, Jr.	82,677	41.47%
American Independent	Gordon G. Barnwall	25,499	12.79%
Majority		8,522	4.27%
Total votes		199,375	100%
Democratic hold			

=== 1970 ===
1970 United States House of Representatives elections, Colorado's 1st district
Party	Candidate	Votes	%
Republican	Mike McKevitt	84,643	51.50%
Democratic	Craig S. Barnes	74,444	45.30%
Raza Unida	Salvadore Carpio, Jr.	5,257	3.20%
Majority		10,199	6.20%
Total votes		164,344	100%
Republican gain from Democratic			

=== 1972 ===
1972 United States House of Representatives elections, Colorado's 1st district
Party	Candidate	Votes	%
Democratic	Pat Schroeder	101,832	51.56%
Republican	Mike McKevitt (incumbent)	93,733	47.46%
Raza Unida	Maria Pauline Serna	1,629	0.82%
Socialist Workers	Fern Gapin	301	0.15%
Majority		8,099	4.10%
Total votes		197,495	100%
Democratic gain from Republican			

=== 1974 ===
1974 United States House of Representatives elections, Colorado's 1st district
Party	Candidate	Votes	%
Democratic	Pat Schroeder (incumbent)	94,583	58.48%
Republican	Frank Southworth	66,046	40.84%
American	Elmer B. Sachs	1,105	0.68%
Majority		27,637	17.64%
Total votes		161,734	100%
Democratic hold			

=== 1976 ===
1976 United States House of Representatives elections, Colorado's 1st district
Party	Candidate	Votes	%
Democratic	Pat Schroeder (incumbent)	103,037	53.22%
Republican	Don Friedman	89,384	46.17%
Socialist Workers	Priscilla Schenk	681	0.35%
U.S. Labor	Lann Meyers	508	0.26%
Majority		13,653	7.05%
Total votes		193,610	100%
Democratic hold			

=== 1978 ===
1978 United States House of Representatives elections, Colorado's 1st district
Party	Candidate	Votes	%
Democratic	Pat Schroeder (incumbent)	82,742	61.46%
Republican	Gene Hutcheson	49,845	37.02%
Socialist Workers	Susan Lorraine Adley	2,043	1.52%
Majority		32,897	24.44%
Total votes		134,630	100%
Democratic hold			

=== 1980 ===
1980 United States House of Representatives elections, Colorado's 1st district
Party	Candidate	Votes	%
Democratic	Pat Schroeder (incumbent)	107,364	59.77%
Republican	Naomi Bradford	67,804	37.75%
Libertarian	John Mason	3,888	2.16%
Socialist Workers	Harold Sudmeyer	566	0.32%
Majority		52,355	25.68%
Total votes		179,622	100%
Democratic hold			

=== 1982–1992 ===
==== 1982 ====
1982 United States House of Representatives elections, Colorado's 1st district
Party	Candidate	Votes	%
Democratic	Pat Schroeder (incumbent)	94,969	60.26
Republican	Arch Decker	59,009	37.44
Libertarian	Robin White	3,619	2.30
Majority		35,960	22.82
Total votes		157,597	100
Democratic win (new boundaries)			

==== 1984 ====
1984 United States House of Representatives elections, Colorado's 1st district
Party	Candidate	Votes	%
Democratic	Pat Schroeder (incumbent)	126,348	61.97
Republican	Mary Downs	73,993	36.29
Socialist Workers	Cathy Emminizer	1,846	0.91
Libertarian	Dwight Filley	1,686	0.83
Majority		52,355	25.68
Total votes		203,873	100
Democratic hold			

==== 1986 ====
1986 United States House of Representatives elections, Colorado's 1st district
Party	Candidate	Votes	%
Democratic	Pat Schroeder (incumbent)	106,113	68.37
Republican	Joy Wood	49,095	31.63
Majority		57,018	36.74
Total votes		155,208	100
Democratic hold			

==== 1988 ====
1988 United States House of Representatives elections, Colorado's 1st district
Party	Candidate	Votes	%
Democratic	Pat Schroeder (incumbent)	133,922	69.93
Republican	Joy Wood	57,587	30.07
Majority		76,335	39.86
Total votes		191,509	100
Democratic hold			

==== 1990 ====
1990 United States House of Representatives elections, Colorado's 1st district
Party	Candidate	Votes	%
Democratic	Pat Schroeder (incumbent)	82,176	63.71
Republican	Gloria Gonzales Roemer	46,802	36.29
Majority		35,374	27.42
Total votes		128,978	100
Democratic hold			

=== 1992–2002 ===
==== 1992 ====
1992 United States House of Representatives elections, Colorado's 1st district
Party	Candidate	Votes	%
Democratic	Pat Schroeder (incumbent)	156,629	68.84
Republican	Raymond Diaz Aragon	70,902	31.16
Majority		85,727	37.68
Total votes		227,531	100
Democratic win (new boundaries)			

==== 1994 ====
1994 United States House of Representatives elections, Colorado's 1st district
Party	Candidate	Votes	%
Democratic	Pat Schroeder (incumbent)	93,123	59.98
Republican	William F. Eggert	61,978	39.92
Write-in		154	0.10
Majority		31,145	20.06
Total votes		155,255	100
Democratic hold			

==== 1996 ====
1996 United States House of Representatives elections, Colorado's 1st district
Party	Candidate	Votes	%
Democratic	Diana DeGette	112,631	56.93
Republican	Joe Rogers	79,540	40.20
Libertarian	Richard Combs	5,668	2.86
Majority		33,091	16.73
Total votes		197,839	100
Democratic hold			

==== 1998 ====
1998 United States House of Representatives elections, Colorado's 1st district
Party	Candidate	Votes	%
Democratic	Diana DeGette (incumbent)	116,628	66.91
Republican	Nancy McClanahan	52,452	30.09
Libertarian	Richard Combs	5,225	3.00
Majority		64,176	36.82
Total votes		174,305	100
Democratic hold			

==== 2000 ====
2000 United States House of Representatives elections in Colorado, Colorado's 1st district
Party	Candidate	Votes	%
Democratic	Diana DeGette (incumbent)	141,831	68.71
Republican	Jesse L. Thomas	56,291	27.27
Libertarian	Richard Combs	5,852	2.83
Reform	Lyle Nasser	2,452	1.19
Write-in		8	0.00
Majority		85,540	41.44
Total votes		206,434	100
Democratic hold			

=== 2002–2012 ===
==== 2002 ====
2002 United States House of Representatives elections in Colorado, Colorado's 1st district
Party	Candidate	Votes	%
Democratic	Diana DeGette (incumbent)	111,718	66.28
Republican	Ken Chlouber	49,884	29.59
Green	Ken Seaman	3,209	1.90
Libertarian	Kent Leonard	2,584	1.53
Constitution	George C. Lilly	1,169	0.69
Majority		61,834	36.69
Total votes		168,564	100.0
Democratic win (new boundaries)			

==== 2004 ====
2004 United States House of Representatives elections in Colorado, Colorado's 1st district
Party	Candidate	Votes	%
Democratic	Diana DeGette (incumbent)	177,077	73.50
Republican	Roland Chicas	58,659	24.35
Constitution	George C. Lilly	5,193	2.16
Majority		118,418	49.15
Total votes		240,929	100
Democratic hold			

==== 2006 ====
2006 United States House of Representatives elections in Colorado, Colorado's 1st district
Party	Candidate	Votes	%
Democratic	Diana DeGette (incumbent)	129,446	79.77
Green	Thomas D. Kelly	32,825	20.23
Majority		96,621	59.54
Total votes		162,271	100
Democratic hold			

==== 2008 ====
2008 United States House of Representatives elections in Colorado, Colorado's 1st district
Party	Candidate	Votes	%
Democratic	Diana DeGette (incumbent)	203,756	71.94
Republican	George C. Lilly	67,346	23.78
Libertarian	Martin L. Buchanan	12,136	4.28
Majority		136,410	48.16
Total votes		283,249	100
Democratic hold			

==== 2010 ====
2010 United States House of Representatives elections in Colorado, Colorado's 1st district
Party	Candidate	Votes	%
Democratic	Diana DeGette (incumbent)	140,073	67.42
Republican	Mike Fallon	59,747	28.76
Green	Gary Swing	2,923	1.41
Libertarian	Clint Jones	2,867	1.38
Constitution	Chris Styskal	2,141	1.03
Majority		80,326	38.66%
Total votes		207,751	100%
Democratic hold			

=== 2012–2022 ===
==== 2012 ====
2012 United States House of Representatives elections in Colorado, Colorado's 1st district
Party	Candidate	Votes	%
Democratic	Diana DeGette (incumbent)	237,579	68.23
Republican	Danny Stroud	93,217	26.77
Libertarian	Frank Atwood	12,585	3.61
Green	Gary Swing	4,829	1.39
Majority		144,362	41.46
Total votes		348,228	100
Democratic win (new boundaries)			

==== 2014 ====
2014 United States House of Representatives elections in Colorado, Colorado's 1st district
Party	Candidate	Votes	%
Democratic	Diana DeGette (incumbent)	183,281	65.81
Republican	Martin Walsh	80,682	28.97
Libertarian	Frank Atwood	9,292	3.34
Independent	Danny Stroud	5,236	1.88
Majority		102,599	36.84
Total votes		278,494	100
Democratic hold			

==== 2016 ====
2016 United States House of Representatives elections in Colorado, Colorado's 1st district
Party	Candidate	Votes	%
Democratic	Diana DeGette (incumbent)	257,254	67.87
Republican	Casper Stockham	105,030	27.71
Libertarian	Frank Atwood	16,752	4.42
Majority		152,224	40.16
Total votes		379,036	100
Democratic hold			

==== 2018 ====
2018 United States House of Representatives elections in Colorado, Colorado's 1st district
Party	Candidate	Votes	%
Democratic	Diana DeGette (incumbent)	272,886	73.81
Republican	Casper Stockham	85,207	23.05
Libertarian	Raymon Doane	11,600	3.14
Majority		187,679	50.76
Total votes		369,693	100.0
Democratic hold			

==== 2020 ====
2020 United States House of Representatives elections in Colorado, Colorado's 1st district
Party	Candidate	Votes	%
Democratic	Diana DeGette (incumbent)	331,621	73.65
Republican	Shane Bolling	105,955	23.53
Libertarian	Kyle Furey	8,749	1.94
Unity	Paul Noel Fiorino	2,524	0.56
Approval Voting	Jan Kok	1,441	0.32
Majority		225,666	50.12
Total votes		450,290	100.0
Democratic hold			

=== 2022–2032 ===
==== 2022 ====
2022 United States House of Representatives elections in Colorado, Colorado's 1st district
Party	Candidate	Votes	%
Democratic	Diana DeGette (incumbent)	226,929	80.3
Republican	Jennifer Qualteri	49,530	17.5
Libertarian	John Kittleson	6,157	2.2
Green	Iris Boswell (write-in)	70	0.0
Total votes		282,686	100.0
Democratic win (new boundaries)			

==== 2024 ====
2024 United States House of Representatives elections in Colorado, Colorado's 1st district
Party	Candidate	Votes	%
Democratic	Diana DeGette (incumbent)	264,606	76.5
Republican	Valdamar Archuleta	74,598	21.6
Unity	Critter Milton	4,084	1.2
Approval Voting	Daniel Lutz	2,351	0.7
Write-in		96	0.0
Total votes		345,735	100.0
Democratic hold			

== Historical district boundaries ==
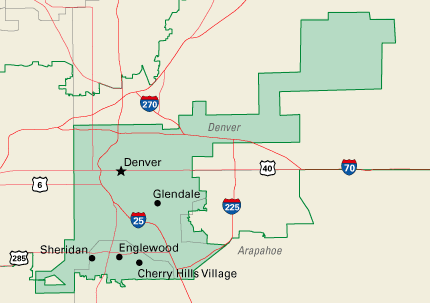
2003–2013

== See also ==
- Colorado's congressional districts
- List of United States congressional districts
