= Clay B. Whitford =

American attorney and politician (1854–1914)

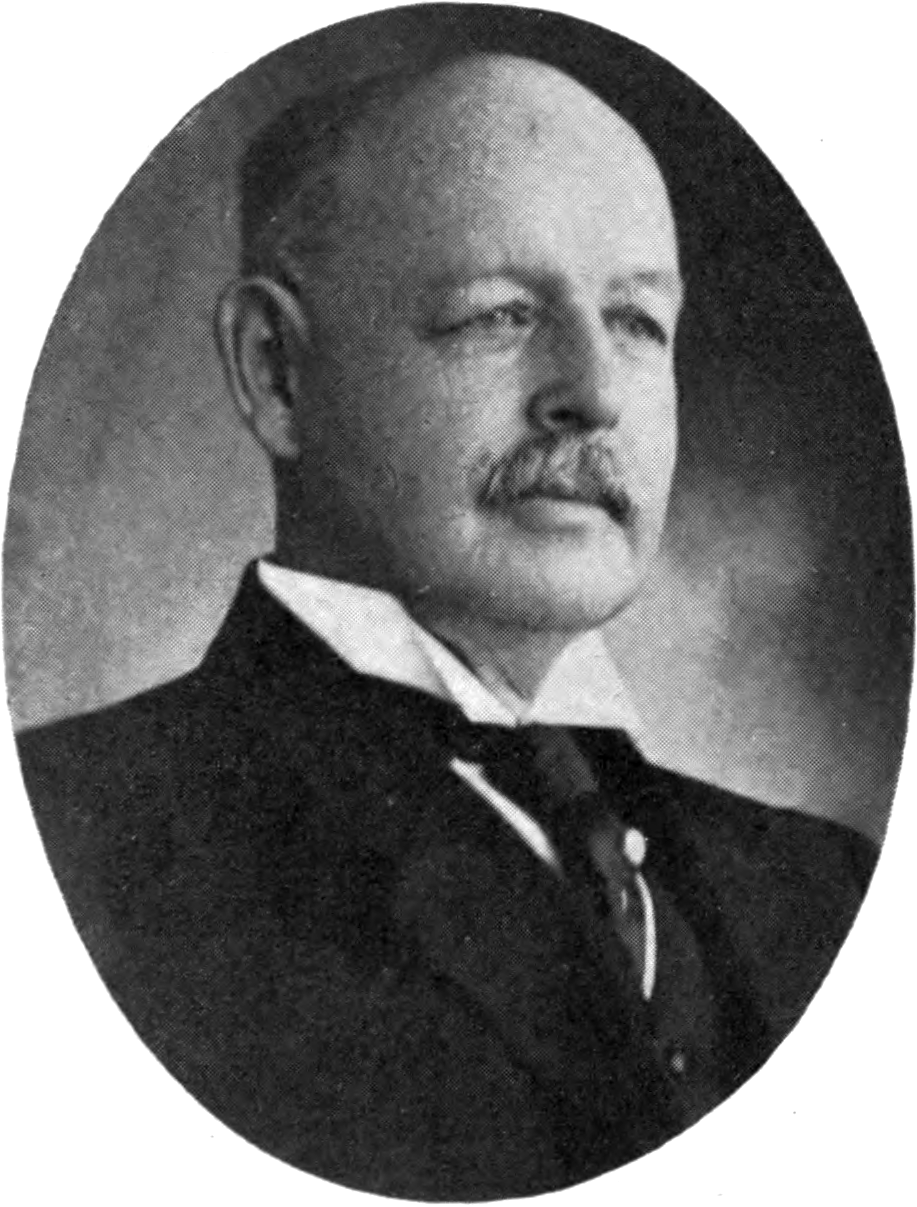
- Whitford's portrait for the Colorado Bar Association

Member of the Colorado Senate from the 1st district
- In office 1899–1902
- Preceded by: John F. Shafroth
- Succeeded by: Robert W. Bonynge

Personal details
- Born: Clay Brockway Whitford; July 29, 1854 Rockville, Indiana, US
- Died: July 12, 1914 (aged 59) Denver, Colorado, US
- Party: Democratic
- Relations: Greeley W. Whitford (brother)
- Education: Iowa Wesleyan College
- Occupation: Politician, attorney

Clay Brockway Whitford (July 29, 1854 — July 12, 1914) was an American attorney and politician.

== Biography ==
Whitford was born on July 29, 1854, in Rockville, Indiana. He received a B.A. from Iowa Wesleyan University in 1876, then a A.M. in 1879. He was admitted to the Colorado Bar Association 1884. In June 1899, he married Edith F. Kimball, whom he had two daughters with. He later moved to Loveland, Colorado with his sister Mary Harlan Leedham.

As a lawyer, Whitfoed began a law firm with his brother, Greeley W. Whitford, named Whitford & Whitford. In 1903, he was a plaintiff in Wright v. Morgan, a land dispute case which involved Mayor Robert R. Wright.

From 1899 to 1902, Whitford was a Democratic member of the Colorado Senate from the 1st district He was appointed by governor Charles S. Thomas to revise the revenue laws. His changes were rejected, as they were thought to be corrupt. During the 1904 elections, Whitford got 46.27% of the vote—50,022 votes—losing to Robert W. Bonynge.

Whitford died on July 12, 1914, aged 59, in Denver. After his death, his brother Greeley married his widowed wife.
