= Atterson W. Rucker =

American politician (1847–1924)

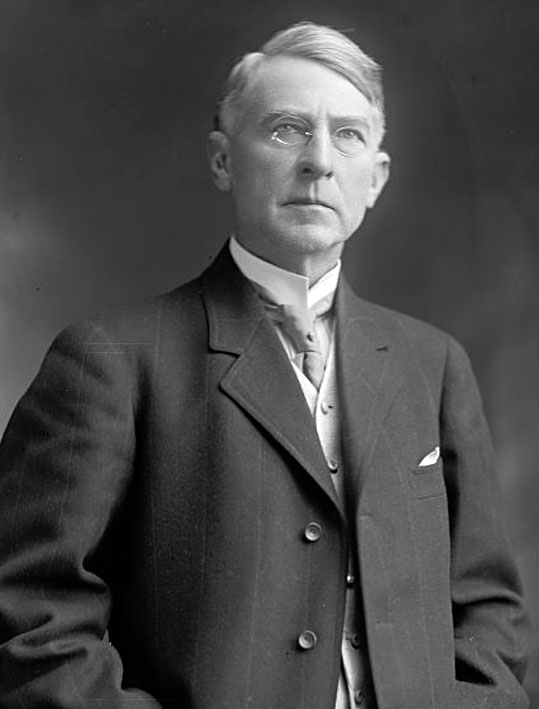

Member of the U.S. House of Representatives from Colorado's 1st district
- In office March 4, 1909 – March 3, 1913
- Preceded by: Robert W. Bonynge
- Succeeded by: George J. Kindel

Personal details
- Born: Atterson Walden Rucker; April 3, 1847 Harrodsburg, Kentucky, U.S.
- Died: July 19, 1924 (aged 77) Denver, Colorado, U.S.
- Resting place: Littleton Cemetery; Littleton, Colorado
- Party: Democratic
- Occupation: Lawyer

Military service
- Allegiance: Confederate States
- Branch/service: Confederate States Army
- Rank: Private
- Unit: 16th Missouri Infantry
- Battles/wars: American Civil War

Atterson Walden Rucker (April 3, 1847 – July 19, 1924) was an American lawyer, mining executive, and politician who served as a U.S. representative from Colorado from 1909 to 1913. He had previously served in the Confederate States Army during the Civil War.

== Biography ==
Born in Harrodsburg, Kentucky, Rucker moved in early youth with his parents to Missouri. He attended the common schools. He served four years in the Confederate States Army during the Civil War. He studied law, was admitted to the bar in 1868 and commenced practice in Lexington, Missouri, the following year.

He moved to Baxter Springs, Kansas, in 1873 and resumed the practice of law. He moved to Leadville, Colorado, in 1879 and continued the practice of his profession. He was also interested in mining. He served as judge of the court of records of Lake County in 1881 and 1882. He moved to Aspen, Colorado, in 1885 and became largely interested in the development of mining projects.

== Congress and retirement ==
Rucker was elected as a Democrat to the Sixty-first and Sixty-second Congresses (March 4, 1909 – March 3, 1913). He was an unsuccessful candidate for renomination in 1912.

He returned to Colorado and settled in Denver, where he resumed his career in the mining business.

== Death and burial ==
He died near Mount Morrison, Colorado, on July 19, 1924. He was interred in the Littleton Cemetery, Littleton, Colorado.

== Electoral history ==
1908 United States House of Representatives elections, Colorado's 1st district
Party	Candidate	Votes	%
Democratic	Atterson W. Rucker	60,643	49.87%
Republican	Robert W. Bonynge (incumbent)	57,597	47.37%
Socialist	S.S. Greear	3,356	2.76%
Majority		3,046	2.50%
Total votes		121,596	100%
Democratic gain from Republican			

1910 United States House of Representatives elections, Colorado's 1st district
Party	Candidate	Votes	%
Democratic	Atterson W. Rucker (incumbent)	40,458	40.77%
Republican	James C. Burger	37,966	38.26%
Prohibition	George John Kindel	17,144	17.28%
Socialist	John W. Martin	3,661	3.69%
Majority		2,492	2.51%
Total votes		99,229	100%
Democratic hold			

1914 United States House of Representatives elections, Colorado's 1st district
Party	Candidate	Votes	%
Democratic	Benjamin Hilliard	26,169	40.56%
Republican	Horace F. Phelps	21,569	33.43%
Progressive	Archibald A. Lee	8,729	13.53%
Independent	Atterson W. Rucker	5,445	8.44%
Socialist	Benjamin Blumenberg	2,612	4.05%
Majority		4,600	7.13%
Total votes		64,524	100%
Democratic hold			

== Sources ==
- United States Congress. "Atterson W. Rucker (id: R000492)". Biographical Directory of the United States Congress. Retrieved on 2009-03-02

U.S. House of Representatives
Preceded by Robert W. Bonynge	Member of the U.S. House of Representatives from Colorado's 1st congressional district 1909-1913	Succeeded by George Kindel
