= Bonynge =

Bonynge is a surname. Notable people with the surname include:

- Richard Bonynge (born 1930), Australian conductor and pianist
- Robert W. Bonynge (1863–1939), American lawyer
