= Robert W. Bonynge =

American politician (1863–1939)

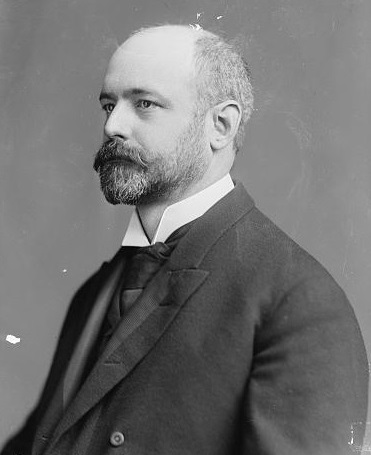
- Robert W. Bonynge, Colorado Congressman.

Member of the Colorado House of Representatives from the 1st district
- In office February 16, 1904 – March 3, 1909
- Preceded by: John F. Shafroth
- Succeeded by: Atterson W. Rucker

Personal details
- Born: September 8, 1863 New York City, US
- Died: September 22, 1939 (aged 76) New York City, US
- Resting place: Woodlawn Cemetery
- Children: 1
- Education: City College of New York

Robert William Bonynge (September 8, 1863 – September 22, 1939) was a lawyer in Denver and New York City. He was a U.S. representative from Colorado, member of the National Monetary Commission, and the Tripartite Claims Commission. He was chief counsel of the New York State Industrial Commission.

== Early life and education ==
The son of Robert and Susan (Burchell) Bonynge, he was born in New York City on September 8, 1863, and attended public schools. He graduated from the College of the City of New York with a Bachelor's Degree in 1882 and later graduated with a Master's Degree. He graduated from Columbia Law School, New York City and was admitted to the bar in 1885. He was a member of the Delta Kappa Epsilon fraternity.

== Career ==
He began to practice law in New York City. He moved to Denver, Colorado in 1888 and passed the bar in Colorado and continued the practice of law, with his law firm, Bonynge & Hatheway, and Bonynge & Warner. His office was in the Equitable Building.

A Republican, he served as member of the Colorado House of Representatives in 1893 and 1894. From 1894 to 1896, he served on the Colorado Board of Pardons. He was an unsuccessful candidate for election in 1900 to the Fifty-seventh Congress. In 1902, confidence men Sam and Lou Blonger engaged in election fraud for Bonynge.

Bonynge successfully contested the election to the 58th Congress of John F. Shafroth, and served the remainder of the term. He was reelected as a Republican to the Fifty-ninth and 60th Congresses, and served from February 16, 1904 until March 3, 1909. He was an unsuccessful candidate for reelection in 1908 to the 61st Congress.

He served as member of the National Monetary Commission from 1908 to 1912. He spoke about monetary reform around the country in 1912. He resumed the practice of law in Denver, Colorado. He moved to New York City in November 1912 and continued the practice of law with his brother Paul; Their law firm was Bonynge & Bonynge. He was chief counsel of the New York State Industrial Commission from 1916 to 1918.

He was appointed United States agent to the Mixed Claims Commission (United States and Germany) in 1923 and before the Tripartite Claims Commission (United States, Austria, and Hungary) in 1927. He settled claims against Germany to compensate for losses of 114 American people who died in the sinking of the Lusitania in May 1915. By 1930, he resolved 24,000 claims totally over $300,000. The New York Times stated that he accomplished "bringing order out of chaos left by the World War".

Fourteen years after the Black Tom explosion (1916), after years of stating that Germany was at fault for the explosion, he made his case against Germany for that explosion and an explosion in Kingsland, New Jersey. He asked for a total of $40 million in damages. Germany won the case. He appealed the case and in 1937, Germany was found guilty. He was awarded the Townsend Harris Medal by City College in 1939.

== Personal life ==
On January 20, 1886, he married Mary Alida Riblet in New York City. Her father was Col. William H. Riblet. The couple had one child, a son, who died soon after his birth in Denver, Colorado. Mary traveled overseas with her husband as part of his duties. They had an apartment in New York overlooking Central Park.

He was a member of the Woodsmen of the World, Masonic Temple, Knights Templar, Royal El Jebel Shrine, and Elks. In New York, he was a member of several organizations. The couple lived at Hotel Bretton Hall. He was an Episcopalian.

His wife died on August 8, 1937. He established a memorial in her name with The New York Community Trust. He died in New York City, September 22, 1939, and was interred at Woodlawn Cemetery.

== Electoral history ==
1902 United States House of Representatives elections, Colorado's 1st district
Party	Candidate	Votes	%
Democratic	John F. Shafroth (incumbent)	41,440	48.98%
Republican	Robert W. Bonynge	38,648	45.68%
Socialist	Marshall DeWitt	2,680	3.17%
Prohibition	Franklin Moore	1,832	2.17%
Majority		2,792	3.30%
Total votes		84,600	100%
Democratic hold			

1904 United States House of Representatives elections, Colorado's 1st district
Party	Candidate	Votes	%
Republican	Robert W. Bonynge (incumbent)	55,940	51.74%
Democratic	Clay B. Whitford	50,022	46.27%
Prohibition	William C. Johnston	2,153	1.99%
Majority		5,918	5.47%
Total votes		108,115	100%
Republican hold			

1906 United States House of Representatives elections, Colorado's 1st district
Party	Candidate	Votes	%
Republican	Robert W. Bonynge (incumbent)	47,549	55.48%
Democratic	Charles F. Tew	31,133	36.32%
Socialist	Luella Twining	4,989	5.82%
Prohibition	E. E. Evans	2,039	2.38%
Majority		16,416	19.16%
Total votes		85,710	100%
Republican hold			

1908 United States House of Representatives elections, Colorado's 1st district
Party	Candidate	Votes	%
Democratic	Atterson W. Rucker	60,643	49.87%
Republican	Robert W. Bonynge (incumbent)	57,597	47.37%
Socialist	S. S. Greear	3,356	2.76%
Majority		3,046	2.50%
Total votes		121,596	100%
Democratic gain from Republican			

U.S. House of Representatives
Preceded by John Shafroth	Member of the U.S. House of Representatives from Colorado's 1st congressional district February 16, 1904 - March 3, 1909	Succeeded by Atterson W. Rucker
