= Greeley W. Whitford =

American judge (1856–1940)

Greeley Webster Whitford
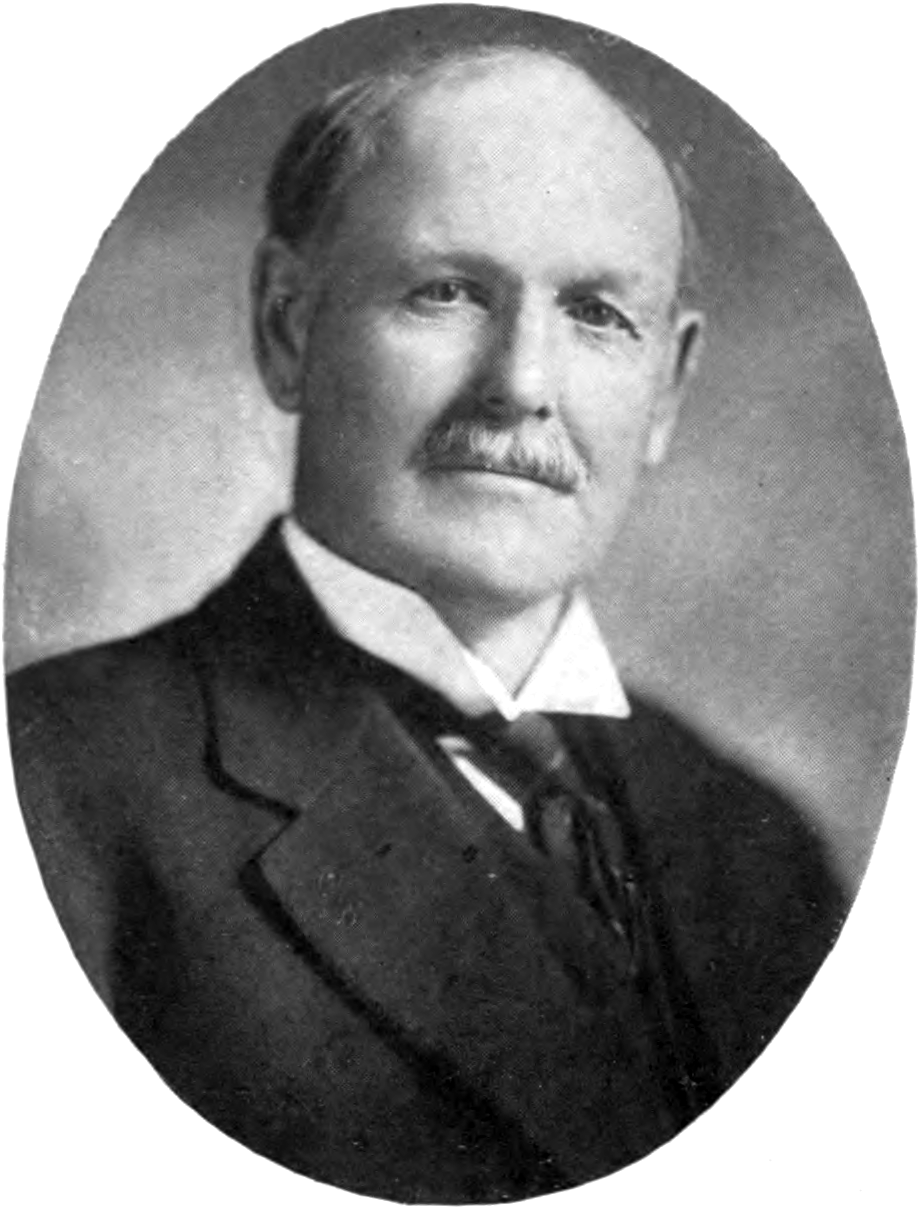
- Whitford's portrait for the Colorado Bar Association

Chief justice of the Colorado Supreme Court
- In office 1921–1931
- Appointed by: William McKinley

Personal details
- Born: June 5, 1856 Rockville, Indiana, US
- Died: May 6, 1940 (aged 83) Denver, Colorado, US
- Resting place: Fairmount Cemetery, Denver
- Spouses: Ida Spaulding (m. 1890; died 1916) Edith F Kimball (m. 1917)
- Relations: Clay B. Whitford (brother)
- Children: 3
- Parents: John Washington Whitford Sr (father); Jane Harlan (mother)
- Education: Simpson College, 1909
- Alma mater: Iowa Wesleyan
- Occupation: Denver Assistant City Attorney 1889–1893; Denver District Attorney 1895–1897; United States District Attorney 1897–1901; Denver Assistant District Attorney 1905–1907; District Judge 1907–1913; Associate Justice of the Supreme Court of Colorado 1921–1929; Chief Justice of the Supreme Court of Colorado 1929–1931
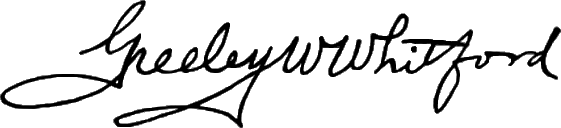
- Signature

Greeley Webster Whitford (June 5, 1856 – May 6, 1940) was a lawyer from Indiana State. After serving as Denver Assistant City Attorney and District Attorney from 1895 to 1896, he was appointed United States Attorney for Colorado by President William McKinley, and later served as an associate justice and chief justice of the Colorado Supreme Court.

== Early life ==
Whitford was born on June 5, 1856, in Rockville, Indiana to John Washington Whitford and Jane Harlan. After graduating from Iowa Wesleyan University, he gained admission to the bar in Iowa in 1882. He then practiced law in Bellingham, Washington from 1884 to 1887, when he moved to Denver, Colorado.

== Career ==
=== Attorney and district judge ===
Whitford was an Assistant City Attorney, and then a District Attorney.

He was one of the attorneys who argued the case of Wright v. Morgan before the Supreme Court of the United States in 1903, which resulted in a judgment by the Supreme Court that federal land conveyed to the city for use as a city cemetery could legally be conveyed by the city to the Roman Catholic Church for the same usage by the church.

In 1907, Whitford was appointed as a state district judge. While serving, he received an LL.B. from Simpson College in 1909. In that capacity, he infuriated labor unions by sentencing sixteen United Mine Workers to a year in jail for contempt of court for violating an injunction previously issued by Whitford, preventing interference with strikebreakers in the Northern Colorado coal fields. This led some members of the Colorado legislature to push for Whitford's impeachment from the bench.

=== Chief Justice of Colorado Supreme Court ===
In 1920, Whitford, then described as "the best known district judge in the state", successfully challenged incumbent justice Jason Garrigues for a seat as an associate justice on the Colorado Supreme Court.

On January 9, 1929, Whitford became Chief Justice, having been elected to that position by his fellow justices. In November 1930, Whitford was defeated in his bid for re-election by Democrat Ben C. Hilliard, losing by a narrow margin of 150,028 votes for Hilliard to Whitford's 148,989 votes.

== Personal life ==
He married Ida Spaulding from Mount Pleasant, Iowa in 1890. She was the daughter of Wesley Jepthah Spaulding and Martha Alvira Berry.

Greeley and Ida had three children together: Kent Shelton Whitford, Ruth Edna Whitford and Helen Jane Whitford. After Ida died in 1916, he remarried to his brother, Clay B. Whitford's widow, Edith F (Marshall) Whitford in 1917.

Whitford died May 6, 1940.

Political offices
Preceded by James E. Garrigues	Justice of the Colorado Supreme Court; 1921–1931	Succeeded by Ben C. Hilliard
