= S. Harrison White =

American judge

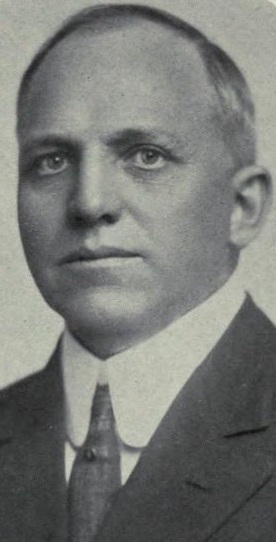

Member of the U.S. House of Representatives from Colorado's 1st district
- In office November 15, 1927 – March 3, 1929
- Preceded by: William Vaile
- Succeeded by: William R. Eaton

Justice of the State Supreme Court
- In office 1909–1919

Chief justice of the Colorado Supreme Court
- In office 1917–1918

Personal details
- Born: Sebastian Harrison White; December 24, 1864 near Maries County, Missouri, US
- Died: December 21, 1945 (aged 80) Colorado Springs, Colorado, US
- Resting place: Fairmount Cemetery, Denver, Colorado
- Party: Democratic
- Occupation: Attorney, Colorado Supreme Court Justice and Chief justice, Congressman

Sebastian Harrison White (December 24, 1864 – December 21, 1945) was an American lawyer, jurist, and politician who served part of one term as a U.S. representative from Colorado, and also as a justice of the Colorado Supreme Court.

== Early life and education ==
Born on a farm near Maries County, Missouri, his parents were Jonah William and Cloa Ann (Reeder) White. His father was from Tennessee and his mother was from Virginia. White attended the rural schools in Dallas County, Missouri and private schools. At the age of ten, White set out on his own, having been "thrown upon his own resources." When he was 16 years of age, he worked as a laborer and was living at the home of a physician and his wife in Lincoln County in Dallas County. He attended the Marionville Collegiate Institute in Missouri (later the Ozark Wesleyan College) at Carthage, Missouri).

== Career ==
He taught school for several years. At 19 years of age, White was elected president of the Hickory County Teachers Institute in 1886. He was elected superintendent of schools of Hickory County, Missouri in 1887 at 23 years of age.

=== Legal career ===
He studied law while he was a teacher and he was admitted to the bar in Colorado and Missouri in 1889 and practiced law in Pueblo, Colorado. He was a partner with Charles P. Dunbaugh in the White & Dunbaugh law firm.

=== Early political career ===
He served as delegate to the Democratic State convention in 1892. He served as chairman of the Pueblo County Democratic central committee in 1892. He served as city attorney of Pueblo from 1897 to 1899. He was a public trustee of Pueblo County from 1900 to 1903 and from 1905 to 1909. He served as district attorney of the tenth judicial district from 1904 to 1908.

White was elected justice of the Colorado Supreme Court in 1908 for a term of ten years 1909 to 1919, and served as chief justice from 1917 until 1918, when he retired. He engaged in the practice of law in Denver, Colorado in 1919.

=== Congress ===
White was elected as a Democrat to the 70th Congress to fill the vacancy caused by the death of William N. Vaile and served from November 15, 1927 to March 3, 1929. He was an unsuccessful candidate for reelection in 1928 to the 71st Congress.

=== Later career ===
He resumed the practice of law in Denver, Colorado.

He was the author of the minority report that precipitated the fight over the fusion with the Populists that resulted in a split in the convention. He was elected secretary of that division of the party which was denominated “The White Wings”, and which nominated a straight Democratic ticket.

He was a member of the American Bar Association, Elks, Knights of Pythias, and the Denver Athletic Club. He was a lecturer across the United States when he was a member of the League to Enforce Peace. His office was in the Equitable Building in Denver.

== Personal life ==
He married Eva Dunbaugh of Pueblo, Colorado in December 1893. Her father was Charles P. Dunbaugh, a hotelier in Pueblo. They had two children: Adrian Dunbaugh White and Gertrude Gloria White.

White was admitted into a hospital in Colorado Springs, Colorado in 1942, where he remained until his death on December 21, 1945. He remains were cremated in Fairmount Cemetery (Denver, Colorado), and the ashes scattered over the cemetery.

== Electoral history ==
1927 United States House of Representatives special election, Colorado's 1st district
Party	Candidate	Votes	%
Democratic	S. Harrison White	32,171	51.52%
Republican	Francis J. Knauss	27,456	43.97%
Independent	George John Kindel	2,556	4.09%
Farmer–Labor	Huston Hugh Marrs	261	0.42%
Majority		4,715	7.55%
Total votes		62,444	100%
Democratic gain from Republican			

1928 United States House of Representatives elections, Colorado's 1st district
Party	Candidate	Votes	%
Republican	William R. Eaton	63,258	58.08%
Democratic	S. Harrison White (incumbent)	44,713	41.05%
Workers	William R. Dietrich	949	0.87%
Majority		18,545	17.03%
Total votes		108,920	100%
Republican gain from Democratic			

U.S. House of Representatives
Preceded by William Vaile	Member of the U.S. House of Representatives from Colorado's 1st congressional district 1927–1929	Succeeded by William R. Eaton
