= Lawrence Lewis (politician) =

American politician

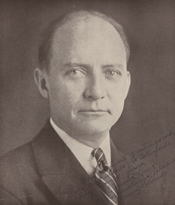

Member of the U.S. House of Representatives from Colorado's 1st district
- In office March 4, 1933 – December 9, 1943
- Preceded by: William R. Eaton
- Succeeded by: Dean M. Gillespie

Personal details
- Born: June 22, 1879 St. Louis, Missouri
- Died: December 9, 1943 (aged 64) Washington, D.C.
- Party: Democratic Party
- Education: Harvard University; Harvard Law School

Lawrence Lewis (June 22, 1879 – December 9, 1943) was an American lawyer, university professor, and politician from Colorado. He was elected to six terms in the United States House of Representatives, serving from 1933 until his death in 1943.

== Early life and career ==
Born in St. Louis, Missouri, Lewis attended the public schools in Evanston, Illinois, Cambridge, Massachusetts, and Pueblo, Colorado. He attended the University of Colorado at Boulder and graduated from Harvard University in 1901.

Early in his career, he worked for newspapers and magazines in Pueblo and Denver, Colorado. He later served as assistant instructor in English at Harvard University from 1906 to 1909. He worked in this post while attending law school, graduating from the Harvard Law School in 1909. He was admitted to the bar the same year and commenced practice in Denver, Colorado.

Back in Denver, he served as member of the Colorado Civil Service Commission from 1917 to 1918. He also served in the military as a private in the Seventeenth Observation Battery, Field Artillery, Central Officers' Training School in 1918.

== Congress ==
He was an unsuccessful candidate for election in 1930 to the Seventy-second Congress. In 1932, he won election as a Democrat to the Seventy-third Congress. He was re-elected to the five succeeding Congresses, serving from March 4, 1933, until his death in 1943.

He was one of the managers appointed by the House of Representatives in 1933 to conduct the impeachment proceedings against Harold Louderback, judge of the United States District Court for the Northern District of California.

== Death ==
He died in Washington, D.C., on December 9, 1943, and was interred in Spring Grove Cemetery, Cincinnati, Ohio.

== Electoral history ==
1930 United States House of Representatives elections, Colorado's 1st district
Party	Candidate	Votes	%
Republican	William R. Eaton (incumbent)	39,907	50.33%
Democratic	Lawrence Lewis	38,152	48.12%
Farmer–Labor	W.R. Duke	813	1.03%
Communist	Louis A. Zeitlin	411	0.52%
Majority		1,755	2.21%
Total votes		79,283	100%
Republican hold			

1932 United States House of Representatives elections, Colorado's 1st district
Party	Candidate	Votes	%
Democratic	Lawrence Lewis	70,826	54.41%
Republican	William R. Eaton (incumbent)	56,601	43.49%
Socialist	Bruce Lamont	1,926	1.48%
Communist	Charles Guynn	422	0.32%
Farmer–Labor	W. R. Duke	385	0.30%
Majority		14,225	10.92%
Total votes		130,160	100%
Democratic gain from Republican			

1934 United States House of Representatives elections, Colorado's 1st district
Party	Candidate	Votes	%
Democratic	Lawrence Lewis (incumbent)	59,744	56.04%
Republican	William R. Eaton	34,073	31.96%
Old Age Pension	Charles W. Varnum	9,511	8.92%
Socialist	Carle Whitehead	2,540	2.38%
Communist	George Bardwell	743	0.70%
Majority		25,671	24.08%
Total votes		106,611	100%
Democratic hold			

1936 United States House of Representatives elections, Colorado's 1st district
Party	Candidate	Votes	%
Democratic	Lawrence Lewis (incumbent)	100,704	68.96%
Republican	Harry Zimmerhackel	41,574	28.47%
Farmer–Labor	Louella Grant Shirley	2,675	1.83%
Socialist	F. S. Kidneigh	1,073	0.73%
Majority		59,130	40.49%
Total votes		146,026	100%
Democratic hold			

1938 United States House of Representatives elections, Colorado's 1st district
Party	Candidate	Votes	%
Democratic	Lawrence Lewis (incumbent)	83,517	65.31%
Republican	William I. Reilly	42,758	33.44%
Socialist	Edgar P. Sherman	913	0.71%
Prohibition	Oliver L. Barnes	688	0.54%
Majority		40,759	31.87%
Total votes		127,876	100%
Democratic hold			

1940 United States House of Representatives elections, Colorado's 1st district
Party	Candidate	Votes	%
Democratic	Lawrence Lewis (incumbent)	110,078	64.72%
Republican	James D. Parriott	59,427	34.94%
Socialist	Ward Rogers	577	0.34%
Majority		50,651	29.78%
Total votes		170,082	100%
Democratic hold			

1942 United States House of Representatives elections, Colorado's 1st district
Party	Candidate	Votes	%
Democratic	Lawrence Lewis (incumbent)	58,143	53.39%
Republican	Olaf H. Jacobson	50,083	45.99%
Socialist	Ward Rogers	681	0.63%
Majority		8,060	7.40%
Total votes		108,907	100%
Democratic hold			

== See also ==
- List of members of the United States Congress who died in office (1900–1949)

U.S. House of Representatives
Preceded by William R. Eaton	Member of the U.S. House of Representatives from Colorado's 1st congressional district March 4, 1933 - December 9, 1943	Succeeded by Dean M. Gillespie
