= Benjamin Hilliard =

American judge

Benjamin C. Hilliard
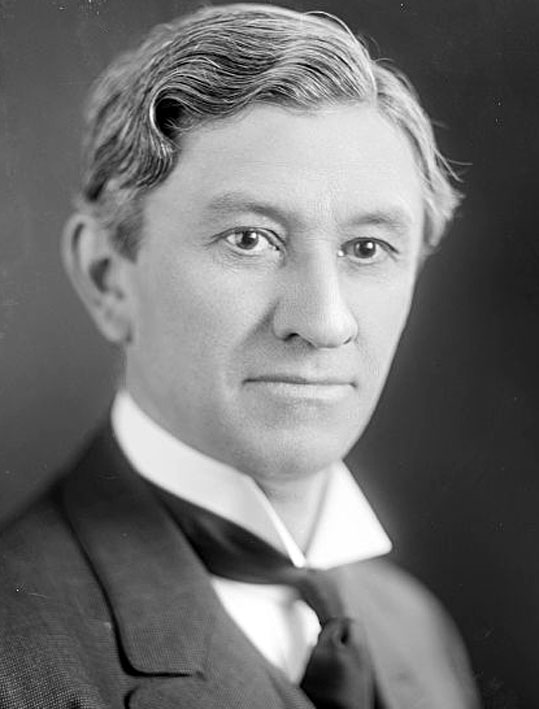

Member of the U.S. House of Representatives from Colorado's 1st district
- In office March 4, 1915 – March 3, 1919
- Preceded by: George Kindel
- Succeeded by: William N. Vaile

Personal details
- Born: Benjamin Clark Hilliard; January 9, 1868 Near Osceola, Iowa
- Died: August 7, 1951 (aged 83) Denver, Colorado
- Resting place: Crown Hill Cemetery
- Party: Democrat
- Education: University of Iowa College of Law

Benjamin Clark Hilliard (January 9, 1868 – August 7, 1951) was an American lawyer, jurist, and politician. He served two terms as a U.S. representative from Colorado, and was a two-time chief justice of the Supreme Court of Colorado.

== Early life and education ==
Born in a log cabin 8 miles (13 km) north of Osceola, Iowa, Hilliard was the son of Albert George Hilliard who was a farmer and served as private in the 37th Illinois Infantry Regiment under Colonel John C. Black. He was severely wounded during the war, and carried bullets within his body and his right eye was destroyed.

His mother, Euphema Ellen Clark, was an educated and cultured woman who died in 1881. At the time of her death, Hilliard had two siblings. His father remarried and moved to Kansas, where he died due to accidental drowning in 1906.

Hilliard attended the public schools of Iowa and Kansas. He taught school in Kansas. He graduated from the University of Iowa College of Law in 1891.

== Career ==
He was admitted to the bar in Iowa in 1891 and in Missouri in 1892. He commenced practice in Kansas City, Missouri. He moved to Denver, Colorado, in 1893 and was admitted to the bar in Colorado that year. He served as city attorney of Highlands, Colorado (Note: Highlands was then a suburb of Denver. Highlands, also called Highlandtown, was a settlement in Arapahoe County, Colorado, that was annexed to Denver about 1897. There was also a settlement called Highland, Denver near downtown Denver, that with its neighbor, West Highland, was sometimes called the "Highlands". It became part of Denver in 1896. His house at 3132 Federal Boulevard is located in what is now the Highland neighborhood.) in 1896 and 1897, as county attorney of Elbert County, Colorado, from 1897 to 1907, and as county attorney of Grand County, Colorado 1909-1913.

=== State legislature ===
Initially a Republican, Hilliard joined the Democratic party in 1902. He served as member of the Colorado House of Representatives in 1902. He served as member of the Denver Board of Education 1900-1902 from 1904 to 1909, and 1913-1917.

=== Congress ===
Hilliard was elected as a Democrat to the Sixty-fourth and Sixty-fifth Congresses (March 4, 1915 – March 3, 1919). On April 5, 1917, he voted against declaring war on Germany. He was not a candidate for renomination in 1918.

=== State Supreme Court ===
He resumed the practice of law. Hilliard was elected justice of the Supreme Court of Colorado in 1930 and served as chief justice in 1939, 1940, 1944, 1949 and 1950. Due to his many minority opinions, he was frequently called the state's "great dissenter".

=== Affiliations ===
He was a member of the Denver Civic and Commercial Association and the Denver and Colorado bar associations. He was active in the local Masonic Temple and his church.

== Personal life ==
On May 22, 1889, Hilliard married Tida Zimmerman in Carroll County, Missouri. Her parents, John and Dora Zimmerman, were wealthy farmers and provided a good education for their daughter, Tida. They had four children, two sons and two daughters. Both of his sons became lawyers. His wife died in 1946.

== Death and burial ==
He had a heart attack on August 1, 1951, and was taken to St. Luke's Hospital. He died in Denver, Colorado, August 7, 1951. He was interred in Crown Hill Cemetery.

== Electoral history ==
1914 United States House of Representatives elections, Colorado's 1st district
Party	Candidate	Votes	%
Democratic	Benjamin Hilliard	26,169	40.56%
Republican	Horace F. Phelps	21,569	33.43%
Progressive	Archibald A. Lee	8,729	13.53%
Independent	Atterson W. Rucker	5,445	8.44%
Socialist	Benjamin Blumenberg	2,612	4.05%
Majority		4,600	7.13%
Total votes		64,524	100%
Democratic hold			

1916 United States House of Representatives elections, Colorado's 1st district
Party	Candidate	Votes	%
Democratic	Benjamin C. Hilliard (incumbent)	30,146	48.53%
Republican	William N. Vaile	26,121	42.05%
Liberal	George John Kindel	3,306	5.32%
Socialist	Charles A. Ahlstrom	2,551	4.11%
Majority		4,025	6.48%
Total votes		62,124	100%
Democratic hold			

== Notes ==
U.S. House of Representatives
Preceded by George Kindel	Member of the U.S. House of Representatives from Colorado's 1st congressional district March 4, 1915 – March 3, 1919	Succeeded by William N. Vaile
