= William R. Eaton =

American politician (1877–1942)

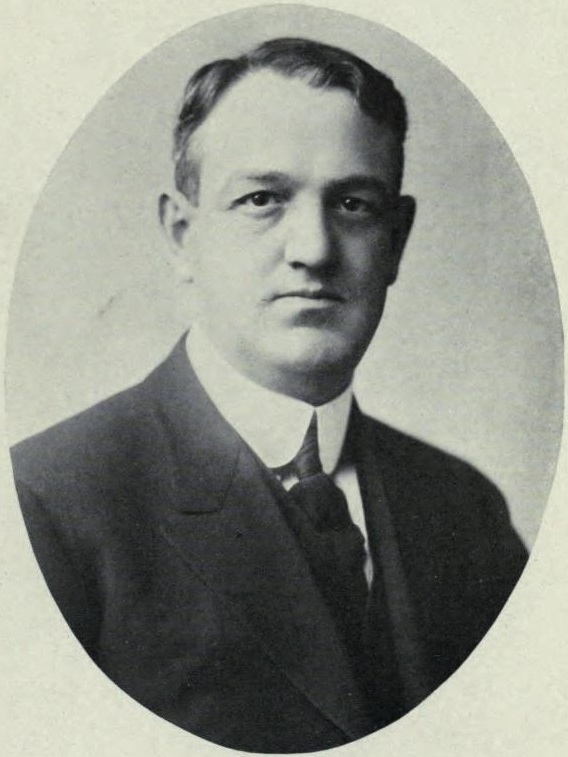

Member of the U.S. House of Representatives from Colorado's 1st district
- In office March 4, 1929 – March 3, 1933
- Preceded by: S. Harrison White
- Succeeded by: Lawrence Lewis

Member of the Colorado Senate from the 1st district
- In office 1923–1927
- In office 1915–1919

Personal details
- Born: William Robb Eaton; December 17, 1877 Pugwash, Nova Scotia, Canada
- Died: December 16, 1942 (aged 64) Denver, Colorado, US
- Resting place: Fairmount Cemetery
- Party: Republican
- Education: University of Denver (law, 1909)
- Occupation: Attorney, district attorney, senator, congressman
- Committees: Public Lands Committee
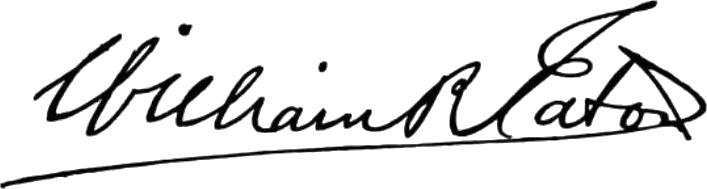
- Signature

Military service
- Branch/service: National Guard of Colorado
- Years of service: 1898 to 1904
- Rank: First lieutenant
- Unit: Troop B, First Squadron Cavalry

William Robb Eaton (December 17, 1877 – December 16, 1942) was an American businessman, lawyer, Spanish-American War veteran, and politician who served two terms as a U.S. representative from Colorado from 1929 to 1933.

He was the nephew of Charles Aubrey Eaton.

== Early life and education ==
Born in Pugwash, Province of Nova Scotia, Canada, his parents were Cyrus B. and Margaret S. (Whidden) Eaton. He was of New England ancestry. Eaton immigrated to the United States with his parents who settled in Boston, Massachusetts, in 1878, and in Denver, Colorado, in 1881. He attended public and private schools.

== Early and law school ==
Beginning at the age of 12, he was employed as a bank clerk from 1889 to 1901. He engaged as a jobber and wholesaler and in the warehouse business 1901 to 1909. He served in Troop B, First Squadron Cavalry, National Guard of Colorado from 1898 to 1904. He served during the Spanish–American War.

He was graduated from the law department of the University of Denver in 1909. He was admitted to the bar the same year and commenced practice in Denver.

== Political career ==
He served as deputy district attorney of the second judicial district 1909 to 1913.

=== State legislature ===
He served as member of the State senate 1915 to 1918 and 1923 to 1926. He was a sponsor of the Colorado State Workmen's Compensation Law in 1915. He specialized in oil and shale land property rights, insurance, mining, and corporate law. He served on the Public Lands Committee. He was interested in the establishment of military installations and the expansion of the Fitzsimons General Hospital near Denver.

=== Congress ===
Eaton was elected as a Republican to the 71st and 72nd Congresses (March 4, 1929 – March 3, 1933). He was an unsuccessful candidate for reelection in 1932 to the 73rd Congress and for election in 1934 to the 74th Congress. His loss in 1932 is attributed to his position that the prohibition should not have been repealed.

== Later career ==
He resumed the practice of law in Denver, Colorado. He was a member of the Masonic Temple, the city, state, national and international bar associations, the National Association for Constitutional Government. He was also a member of the Sons and Daughters of the Pilgrims and the Colorado State Historical Society.

== Personal life ==
On September 16, 1909, he married Liela Carter. She was president of the board of the State Industrial School for Girls at Mt. Morrison. Her residence was the Colburn Hotel in Denver.

== Death and burial ==
He died in Denver on December 16, 1942, as the result of complications following surgery, and was interred in Denver's Fairmount Cemetery.

== Electoral history ==
1928 United States House of Representatives elections, Colorado's 1st district
Party	Candidate	Votes	%
Republican	William R. Eaton	63,258	58.08%
Democratic	S. Harrison White (incumbent)	44,713	41.05%
Workers	William R. Dietrich	949	0.87%
Majority		18,545	17.03%
Total votes		108,920	100%
Republican gain from Democratic			

1930 United States House of Representatives elections, Colorado's 1st district
Party	Candidate	Votes	%
Republican	William R. Eaton (incumbent)	39,907	50.33%
Democratic	Lawrence Lewis	38,152	48.12%
Farmer–Labor	W.R. Duke	813	1.03%
Communist	Louis A. Zeitlin	411	0.52%
Majority		1,755	2.21%
Total votes		79,283	100%
Republican hold			

1932 United States House of Representatives elections, Colorado's 1st district
Party	Candidate	Votes	%
Democratic	Lawrence Lewis	70,826	54.41%
Republican	William R. Eaton (incumbent)	56,601	43.49%
Socialist	Bruce Lamont	1,926	1.48%
Communist	Charles Guynn	422	0.32%
Farmer–Labor	W. R. Duke	385	0.30%
Majority		14,225	10.92%
Total votes		130,160	100%
Democratic gain from Republican			

1934 United States House of Representatives elections, Colorado's 1st district
Party	Candidate	Votes	%
Democratic	Lawrence Lewis (incumbent)	59,744	56.04%
Republican	William R. Eaton	34,073	31.96%
Old Age Pension	Charles W. Varnum	9,511	8.92%
Socialist	Carle Whitehead	2,540	2.38%
Communist	George Bardwell	743	0.70%
Majority		25,671	24.08%
Total votes		106,611	100%
Democratic hold			

U.S. House of Representatives
Preceded by S. Harrison White	Member of the U.S. House of Representatives from Colorado's 1st congressional district March 4, 1929 - March 3, 1933	Succeeded by Lawrence Lewis
