= Lafe Pence =

American politician (1857–1923)

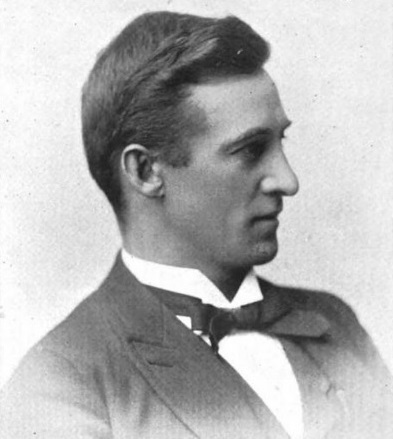

Member of the U.S. House of Representatives from Colorado's 1st district
- In office March 4, 1893 – March 3, 1895
- Preceded by: District created
- Succeeded by: John F. Shafroth

Member of the Colorado House of Representatives
- In office 1885

Personal details
- Born: Lafayette Pence; December 23, 1857 Columbus, Indiana, U.S.
- Died: October 22, 1923 (aged 65) Washington, D.C., U.S.
- Resting place: Garland Brook Cemetery, Columbus, Indiana, U.S.
- Party: Populist
- Education: Hanover College
- Profession: Politician, lawyer

Lafayette "Lafe" Pence (December 23, 1857 – October 22, 1923) was an American lawyer and politician who served one term as a U.S. representative from Colorado from 1893 to 1895.

== Biography ==
Born in Columbus, Indiana, Pence attended the common schools. He was graduated from Hanover College in 1877. He studied law. He was admitted to the bar in 1878 and practiced in Columbus, Indiana, until September 1879, when he moved to Winfield, Kansas. He moved to Rico, Colorado, in 1881 and continued the practice of law until 1884.

== Career ==
He served as a member of the Colorado House of Representatives in 1885. He settled in Denver in 1885 and continued the practice of law. He served as prosecuting attorney for Arapahoe County in 1887 and 1888.

=== Congress ===
Pence was elected as a Populist to the Fifty-third Congress (March 4, 1893 – March 3, 1895). He was an unsuccessful candidate for reelection in 1894 to the Fifty-fourth Congress.

=== Later career ===
He moved to New York City and engaged in railroad work. He returned to Denver and from there moved to San Francisco, California, and subsequently to Washington, D.C., and continued the practice of law. He also engaged in hydraulic mining in Breckenridge, Colorado, and Portland, Oregon.

== Death and burial ==
He died in Washington, D.C., October 22, 1923. He is interred in Garland Brook Cemetery, Columbus, Indiana.

== Electoral history ==
1892 United States House of Representatives elections, Colorado's 1st district
Party	Candidate	Votes	%
Populist	Lafayette Pence	20,004	49.11%
Republican	Earl B. Coe	17,609	43.23%
Democratic	John G. Taylor	2,240	5.50%
Prohibition	W.G. Sprague	876	2.15%
Majority		2,395	5.88%
Total votes		40,729	100%
Populist gain from new seat			

1894 United States House of Representatives elections, Colorado's 1st district
Party	Candidate	Votes	%
Republican	John F. Shafroth	47,710	55.32%
Populist	Lafayette Pence (incumbent)	34,223	39.68%
Prohibition	Robert H. Rhodes	2,465	2.86%
Democratic	John T. Bottom	1,847	2.14%
Majority		13,487	15.64%
Total votes		86,245	100%
Republican gain from Populist			

U.S. House of Representatives
Preceded by District created	Member of the U.S. House of Representatives from Colorado's 1st congressional district 1893–1895	Succeeded by John F. Shafroth
