= William N. Vaile =

American politician (1876–1927)

William Newell Vaile
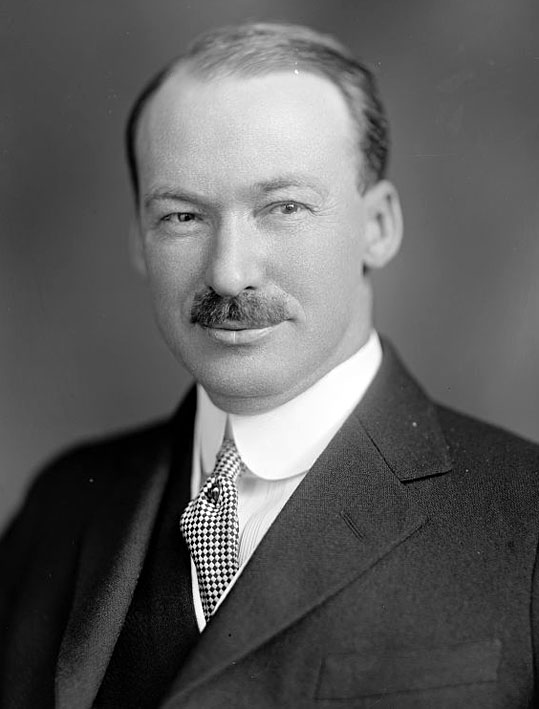

Member of the U.S. House of Representatives from Colorado's 1st district
- In office March 4, 1919 – July 2, 1927
- Preceded by: Benjamin Hilliard
- Succeeded by: S. Harrison White

Personal details
- Born: June 22, 1876 Kokomo, Indiana, United States
- Died: July 2, 1927 (aged 51) Grand Lake, Colorado, United States
- Cause of death: Heart attack
- Resting place: Fairmount Cemetery, Denver, Colorado, United States
- Party: Republican
- Education: Yale College

William Newell Vaile (June 22, 1876 – July 2, 1927) was an American lawyer, military veteran, and politician who served five terms as a U.S. representative from Colorado from 1919 until his death in 1927.

== Biography ==
Born in Kokomo, Indiana, Vaile moved with his parents to Denver, Colorado, in 1881. Vaile was of English descent.

He attended the public schools and graduated from Yale College in 1898. During the Spanish–American War, he served as a private in the First Regiment of the Connecticut Volunteer Field Artillery from May 19, 1898, to October 25, 1898.

Vaile studied law at the University of Colorado Boulder in 1899 and Harvard Law School in 1900–01.

=== Early career ===
He was admitted to the bar in 1901 and began his practice in Denver. He was counsel for the Denver & Rio Grande Railroad, 1901–16, and he served as County Attorney for Jefferson County from 1911 to 1914.

He married Kate Rothwell Varrell on June 14, 1914.

Valie was an unsuccessful Republican candidate for Congress in 1916. He served on the Mexican border from June 28 to December 1, 1916, as a second lieutenant in the First Separate Battalion, National Guard of Colorado.

=== Congress ===
Vaile was elected as a Republican to the Sixty-sixth and to the four succeeding Congresses, serving from March 4, 1919, until his death on July 2, 1927. He served as chairman of the Committee on Expenditures in the Department of the Treasury (Sixty-eighth Congress, March 4, 1923, to March 3, 1925).

Congressman Vaile co-sponsored the Cummins-Vaile Bill which was introduced on April 8, 1924. It was the first birth control bill to reach debate in Congress of the United States.

Congressman Vaile was a noted restrictionist. He was a prominent supporter of the United States Immigration Act of 1924, also known as the National Origins Act, Johnson-Reed Act, or the Immigration Quota Act of 1924. This legislation limited the number of immigrants who could be admitted from any country to 2% of the number of people from that country who were already living in the United States in 1890 according to the census of 1890. These quotas remained in place with minor alterations until the Immigration and Nationality Act of 1965. They had the intended effect of shifting immigration dramatically from Southern, Central, and Eastern Europe to Northern and Western Europe with the foreseeable ethnic results.

On the issue of immigration Vaile said:

Let me emphasize here that the restrictionists of Congress do not claim that the "Nordic" race, or even the Anglo-Saxon race, is the best race in the world. Let us concede, in all fairness that the Czech is a more sturdy laborer … that the Jew is the best businessman in the world, and that the Italian has … a spiritual exaltation and an artistic creative sense which the Nordic rarely attains. Nordics need not be vain about their own qualifications. It well behooves them to be humble.

What we do claim is that the northern European and particularly Anglo-Saxons made this country. Oh, yes; the others helped. But that is the full statement of the case. They came to this country because it was already made as an Anglo-Saxon commonwealth. They added to it, they often enriched it, but they did not make it, and they have not yet greatly changed it.

We are determined that they shall not … It is a good country. It suits us. And what we assert is that we are not going to surrender it to somebody else or allow other people, no matter what their merits, to make it something different. If there is any changing to be done, we will do it ourselves."

-Cong. Rec., April 8, 1924, 5922

In the fall of 1925, Vaile published a novel, The Mystery of Golconda, which dealt with life in the mining camps of the Rocky Mountains.

=== Affiliations ===
During his life, Vaile was a member of the University Club (Denver), the Cactus Club, Masonic orders, the Spanish War Veterans, the Denver Civic and Commercial Association, and the Denver School League.

=== Death and burial ===
On July 2, 1927, Congressman Vaile died of a sudden heart attack as he was traveling by car with friends and family to Grand Lake near Rocky Mountain National Park for the Fourth of July. He was interred in Fairmount Cemetery in Denver, Colorado.

== Electoral history ==
1916 United States House of Representatives elections, Colorado's 1st district
Party	Candidate	Votes	%
Democratic	Benjamin Hilliard (incumbent)	30,146	48.53%
Republican	William N. Vaile	26,121	42.05%
Liberal	George John Kindel	3,306	5.32%
Socialist	Charles A. Ahlstrom	2,551	4.11%
Majority		4,025	6.48%
Total votes		62,124	100%
Democratic hold			

1918 United States House of Representatives elections, Colorado's 1st district
Party	Candidate	Votes	%
Republican	William N. Vaile	27,815	54.19%
Democratic	John L. Stack	16,364	31.88%
Independent	Benjamin Hilliard (incumbent)	6,112	11.91%
Socialist	Fred Underhill	1,039	2.02%
Majority		11,451	22.31%
Total votes		51,330	100%
Republican gain from Democratic			

1920 United States House of Representatives elections, Colorado's 1st district
Party	Candidate	Votes	%
Republican	William N. Vaile (incumbent)	45,658	66.93%
Democratic	Benjamin Hilliard	22,557	33.07%
Majority		23,101	33.86%
Total votes		68,215	100%
Republican hold			

1922 United States House of Representatives elections, Colorado's 1st district
Party	Candidate	Votes	%
Republican	William N. Vaile (incumbent)	32,939	55.48%
Democratic	Benjamin Hilliard	25,477	42.91%
Farmer–Labor	Hattie K. Howard	959	1.62%
Majority		7,462	12.57%
Total votes		59,375	100%
Republican hold			

1924 United States House of Representatives elections, Colorado's 1st district
Party	Candidate	Votes	%
Republican	William N. Vaile (incumbent)	47,155	54.19%
Democratic	James G. Edgeworth	36,519	41.97%
Farmer–Labor	Thomas O. Spacey	2,686	3.09%
Workers	Louis A. Zetlin	654	0.75%
Majority		10,636	12.22%
Total votes		87,014	100%
Republican hold			

1926 United States House of Representatives elections, Colorado's 1st district
Party	Candidate	Votes	%
Republican	William N. Vaile (incumbent)	39,909	54.86%
Democratic	Benjamin Hilliard	30,337	41.70%
Farmer–Labor	Isaac Dunn	1,972	2.71%
Socialist	Clyde Robinson	530	0.73%
Majority		9,572	13.16%
Total votes		72,748	100%
Republican hold			

== See also ==
- List of members of the United States Congress who died in office (1900–1949)

U.S. House of Representatives
Preceded by Benjamin Hilliard	Member of the U.S. House of Representatives from Colorado's 1st congressional district March 4, 1919 - July 2, 1927	Succeeded by S. Harrison White
