= James C. Burger =

American politician (1866–1937)

Member of the Colorado House of Representatives from the 1st district
- In office 1910–1914

Personal details
- Born: James Cardwell Burger; November 21, 1866 New York City, US
- Died: March 2, 1937 (aged 70) Santa Barbara, California, US
- Occupation: Insurance executive

James Cardwell Burger (November 21, 1866 — March 2, 1937) was an American politician who served two terms in the Colorado House of Representatives from 1910 to 1914.

== Biography ==
Burger was born on November 21, 1886, in New York City. Before politics, he worked as an insurance executive at a bank. He was Episcopalian and member of the Freemasons. Burger served as a Republican for two terms representing the 1st congressional district in the Colorado House of Representatives from 1910 to 1914. In 1920, he was a delegate in the Colorado Republican National Convention. From 1925, he served as the Imperial Potenate for the Shriners. While serving as the Imperial Potenate, he died in his brother's home in Santa Barbara, California, on March 2, 1937.
