= 1914 United States Senate election in Colorado =

- November 3, 1914
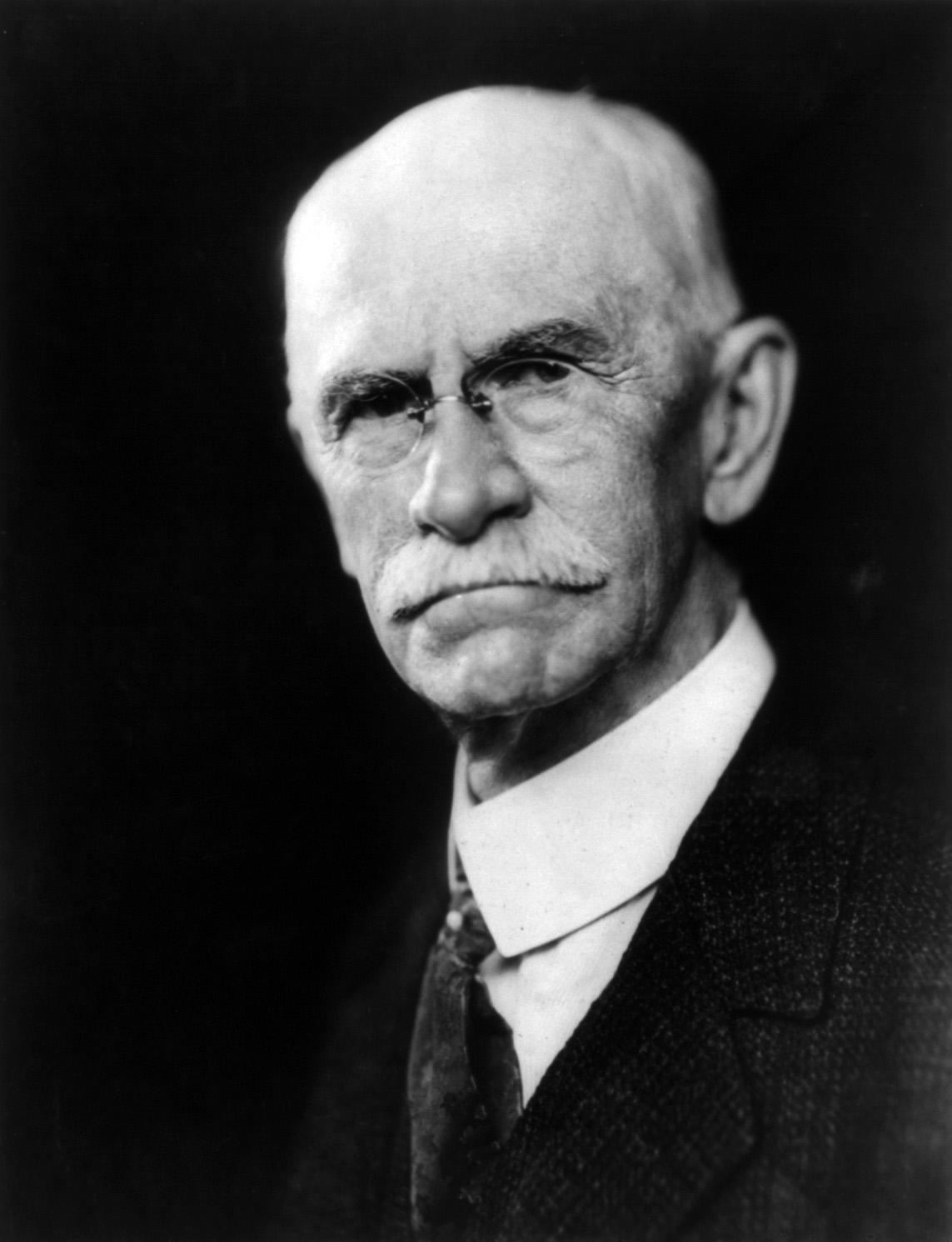

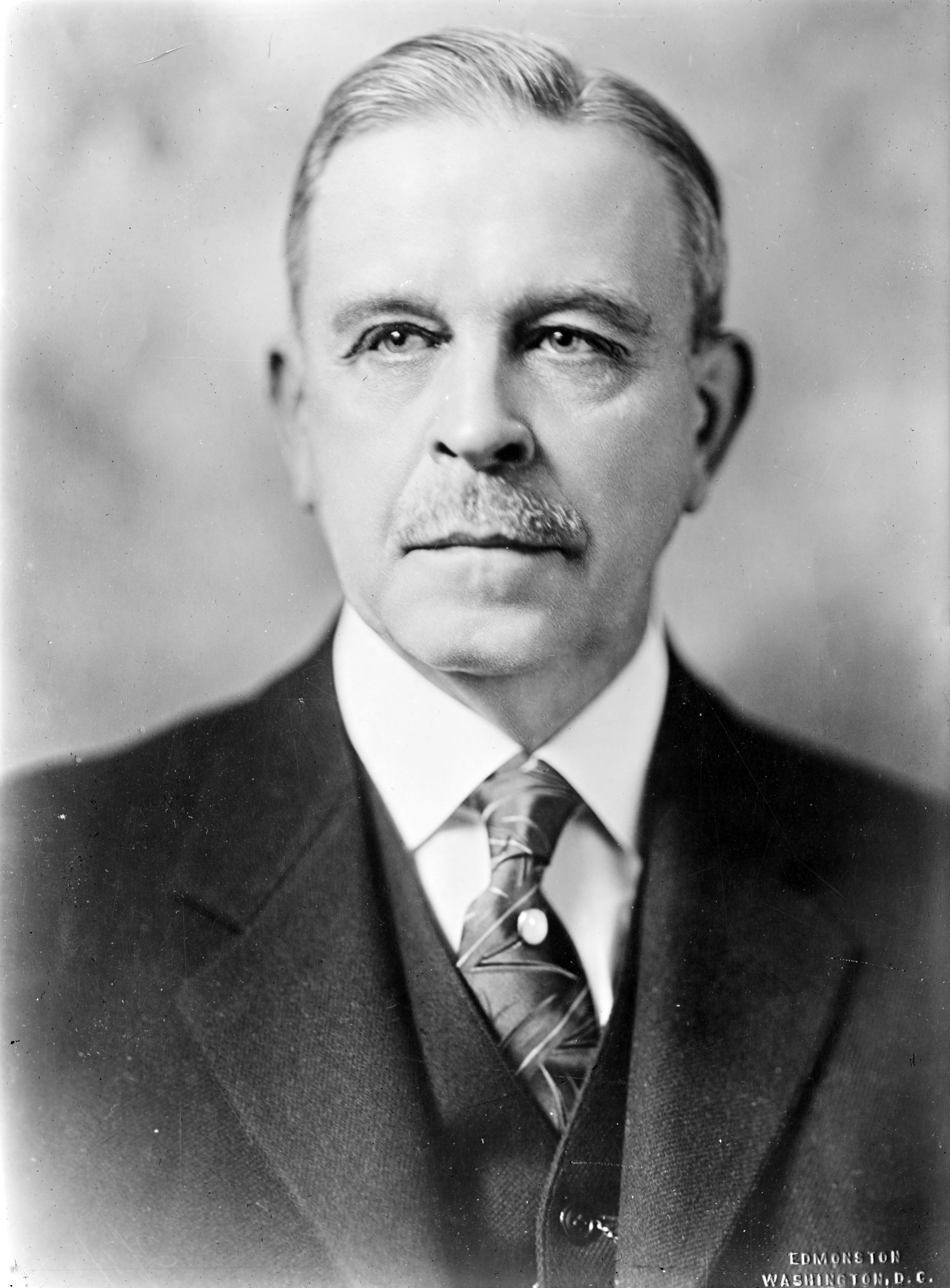

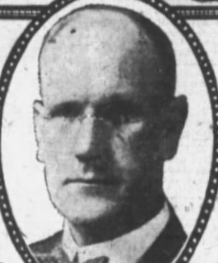

Nominee	Charles S. Thomas	Hubert Work
Party	Democratic	Republican
Popular vote	102,037	98,728
Percentage	40.30%	38.99%
Nominee	Benjamin Griffith	J. C. Griffiths
Party	Progressive	Socialist
Popular vote	27,042	13,943
Percentage	10.68%	5.51%
- County results Thomas: 30–40% 40–50% 50–60% Work: 30–40% 40–50% 50–60% 60–70%
U.S. senator before election
Charles S. Thomas
Democratic
Elected U.S. Senator
Charles S. Thomas
Democratic

The 1914 United States Senate election in Colorado took place on November 3, 1914. It was the first direct U.S. Senate election in Colorado following the ratification of the Seventeenth Amendment. Incumbent U.S. Senator Charles S. Thomas, a Democrat, who was first elected by the state legislature to fill a vacancy in 1913, ran for re-election to a full term.

Thomas faced a competitive general election with several major candidates, including physician Hubert Work, the Republican nominee; former state Attorney General Benjamin Griffith, the Progressive nominee; and Congressman George J. Kindel, who ran as an independent. Thomas narrowly won re-election, but with only a 40% plurality.

== Democratic primary ==
=== Candidates ===
==== Declared ====
- Charles S. Thomas, incumbent U.S. Senator

==== Dropped out ====
- John A. Martin, former U.S. Congressman
- George J. Kindel (ran as independent)

=== Campaign ===
In the leadup to the 1914 election, incumbent Senator Charles Thomas, who was elected to the Senate by the state legislature to fill the remainder of Charles J. Hughes Jr.'s term, faced stiff competition. Former Congressman John A. Martin, who represented southern Colorado in Congress from 1909 to 1913, announced that he would challenge Thomas for renomination, in part on his opposition to both of the state's Senators being from Denver. Congressman George J. Kindel also announced his candidacy, proclaiming, "I'd rather be a dead senator than a live fool representative." Kindel, a controversial representative who routinely opposed the Wilson administration and was frequently at odds with the state's labor movement, campaigned on a platform of reducing transportation rates and achieving "commercial equality" for the state.

However, before the state convention and primary took place, Kindel left the Democratic Party and continued his Senate campaign as an independent. campaigned on a platform of reducing transportation rates and achieving "commercial equality" for the state. At the convention, Kindel's candidacy was condemned, with Frank Leary, the state party chairman, declaring that "the Democrats of Denver would not be under the necessity of burglarizing a mattress factory or robbing an insane asylum to get the right man for Congress." Martin qualified for a spot on the primary election ballot, but ultimately dropped out of the race, enabling Thomas to win the primary uncontested.

=== Results ===
Democratic primary results
Party	Candidate	Votes	%
Democratic	Charles S. Thomas (inc.)	37,032	99.85
Democratic	Write-ins	57	0.15
Total votes		37,089	100.00

== Republican primary ==
=== Candidates ===
==== Declared ====
- Hubert Work, Pueblo physician, Colorado Republican National Committeeman
- Isaac N. Stevens, City Attorney of Denver

==== Dropped out ====
- James H. Brown, attorney

=== Campaign ===
In the 1912 state elections, the Colorado Republican Party was badly fractured, splitting the vote between the Republican and Progressive nominees, and enabling a plurality Democratic win. In the summer of 1914, the parties discussed a fusion, with Progressive leader Isaac N. Stevens, the City Attorney of Denver, announcing that he was joining the Republican Party. Stevens ended up seeking the Republican nomination for the U.S. Senate, and he was opposed by Pueblo physician Hubert Work, a state party leader, and Denver attorney James H. Brown. At the convention, Work and Stevens won places on the primary election ballot.

=== Results ===
Republican primary results
Party	Candidate	Votes	%
Republican	Hubert Work	22,413	57.87
Republican	Isaac N. Stevens	16,313	42.12
Republican	Write-ins	4	0.01
Total votes		38,730	100.00

== Progressive primary ==
=== Candidates ===
- Benjamin Griffith, former state Attorney General

=== Results ===
Progressive primary results
Party	Candidate	Votes	%
Progressive	Benjamin Griffith	5,676	99.98
Progressive	Write-ins	1	0.02
Total votes		5,677	100.00

== General election ==
=== Results ===
1914 United States Senate election in Colorado
Party	Candidate	Votes	%
Democratic	Charles S. Thomas (inc.)	102,037	40.30%
Republican	Hubert Work	98,728	38.99%
Progressive	Benjamin Griffith	27,042	10.68%
Socialist	J. C. Griffiths	13,943	5.51%
Kindel Commercial Equality	George J. Kindel	11,433	4.52%
Total votes		253,183	100.00%
Democratic hold			
