= John F. Shafroth =

American politician (1854–1922)

John Shafroth
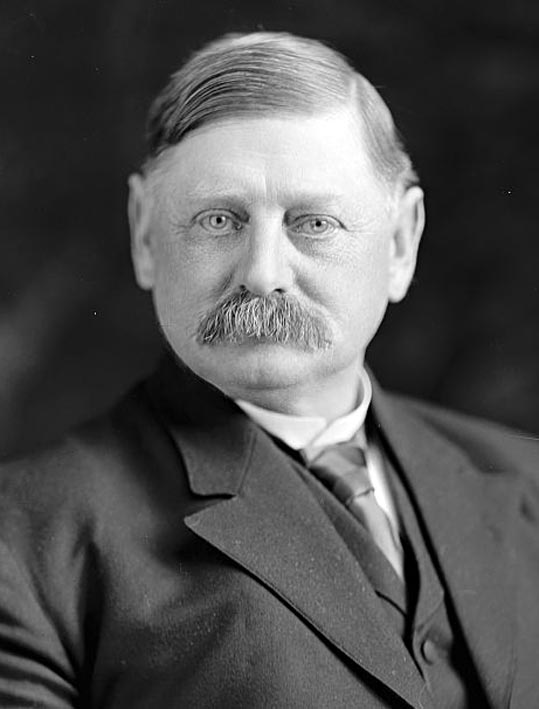

United States Senator from Colorado
- In office March 4, 1913 – March 3, 1919
- Preceded by: Simon Guggenheim
- Succeeded by: Lawrence C. Phipps

18th Governor of Colorado
- In office January 12, 1909 – January 14, 1913
- Lieutenant: Stephen R. Fitzgarrald
- Preceded by: Henry A. Buchtel
- Succeeded by: Elias M. Ammons

Member of the U.S. House of Representatives from Colorado's 1st district
- In office March 4, 1895 – February 15, 1904
- Preceded by: Lafe Pence
- Succeeded by: Robert W. Bonynge

Personal details
- Born: John Franklin Shafroth; June 9, 1854 Fayette, Missouri, U.S.
- Died: February 20, 1922 (aged 67) Denver, Colorado, U.S.
- Resting place: Fairmount Cemetery
- Party: Republican (1895–1897); Silver Republican (1897–1903); Democratic (1903–1922)
- Spouse: Virginia Morrison Shafroth
- Children: 5
- Education: University of Michigan
- Profession: Law

John Franklin Shafroth (June 9, 1854 – February 20, 1922) was an American lawyer and politician who served as a representative, member of the United States Senate, and governor of Colorado during the late 19th and early 20th centuries.

== Early life ==
Born in Fayette, Missouri, he attended the common schools and graduated from the University of Michigan at Ann Arbor in 1875. He studied law and was admitted to the bar in 1876 and began practice in Fayette. He moved to Denver, Colorado, in 1879 and continued the practice of law. Beginning in 1889, one of the attorneys he practiced in partnership with for several years was Charles W. Waterman, later a U.S. Senator.

His son, John F. Shafroth Jr., later a vice admiral in the U.S. Navy during World War II, was born on 31 March 1887.

== Political career ==
=== Congress ===
He was city attorney from 1887 to 1891 and was elected as a Republican to the 54th Congress as a representative. He then joined other Colorado officials, such as Senator Henry M. Teller, in leaving the Republicans to join the Silver Republican Party, the third party on whose ticket he was re-elected to the 55th, 56th, and 57th Congresses. To the 58th Congress, he presented credentials as a Democratic member-elect. Thus, he served in the House from March 4, 1895, to his resignation on February 15, 1904, when he declared that fraud in 29 electoral precincts made him unable to assert that he had legitimately won the election and requested for his opponent, Robert W. Bonynge, to replace him. Subsequently, Shafroth was often referred to (sometimes admiringly, sometimes sarcastically) as "Honest John."

=== Governor ===
Shafroth was Governor of Colorado from 1909 to 1913. During his tenure he presided over various reforms concerning working conditions and was instrumental in bringing in Colorado's ballot-initiative institutions.

=== Senate ===
In 1912, he was elected as a Democrat to the Senate, where he served one term, from March 4, 1913, to March 3, 1919; he was an unsuccessful candidate for re-election in 1918.

While a Senator, Shafroth was chairman of the Committee on Pacific Islands and Puerto Rico (63rd to 65th Congresses), the leading Senate sponsor of the Jones-Shafroth Act of 1917 (which granted citizenship to Puerto Ricans), and a member of the Committee on the Philippines (65th Congress).

== Later life and death ==
After leaving the Senate, he served as chairman of the War Minerals Relief Commission from 1919 to 1921.

He died on February 20, 1922, and was interred in Fairmount Cemetery in Denver. His personal and official papers are archived at several locations including the Colorado State Archives (gubernatorial papers), the Colorado Historical Society Library, and the Denver Public Library's Western History and Genealogy Department.

== Electoral history ==
=== 1912 U.S. Senate ===
Colorado popular vote, class 2
Party	Candidate	Votes	%
Democratic	John F. Shafroth	118,260	47.34%
Republican	Clyde Dawson	66,949	26.80%
Progressive	Frank Catlin	58,649	23.48%
Prohibition	Mary E. Miller	5,948	2.38%

The Colorado General Assembly ratified that decision January 14, 1913, by electing Thomas.

Colorado legislative vote, class 2 (combined votes of both houses)
Party	Candidate	Votes	%
Democratic	John F. Shafroth	86	87.8%
Republican	Clyde Dawson	11	11.2%
Progressive	Frank Catlin	1	1.0%
Democratic gain from Republican			

== Sources ==
- "United States Senators Chosen, 1913". The Tribune Almanac and Political Register 1914. New York City: The Tribune Association. 1914. pp. 458–460 – via HathiTrust Digital Library.

Party political offices
Preceded by Alva Adams	Democratic nominee for Governor of Colorado; 1908, 1910	Succeeded by Elias M. Ammons
First	Democratic nominee for U.S. Senator from Colorado (Class 2); 1913, 1918	Succeeded by Alva B. Adams
U.S. House of Representatives
Preceded by Lafayette Pence	Member of the U.S. House of Representatives from Colorado's 1st congressional district 1895–1904	Succeeded by Robert W. Bonynge
Political offices
Preceded by Henry Augustus Buchtel	Governor of Colorado; 1909–1912	Succeeded by Elias Milton Ammons
U.S. Senate
Preceded by Simon Guggenheim	U.S. senator (Class 2) from Colorado; 1913–1919; Served alongside: Charles S. Thomas	Succeeded by Lawrence C. Phipps
