= George John Kindel =

American politician

George J. Kindel
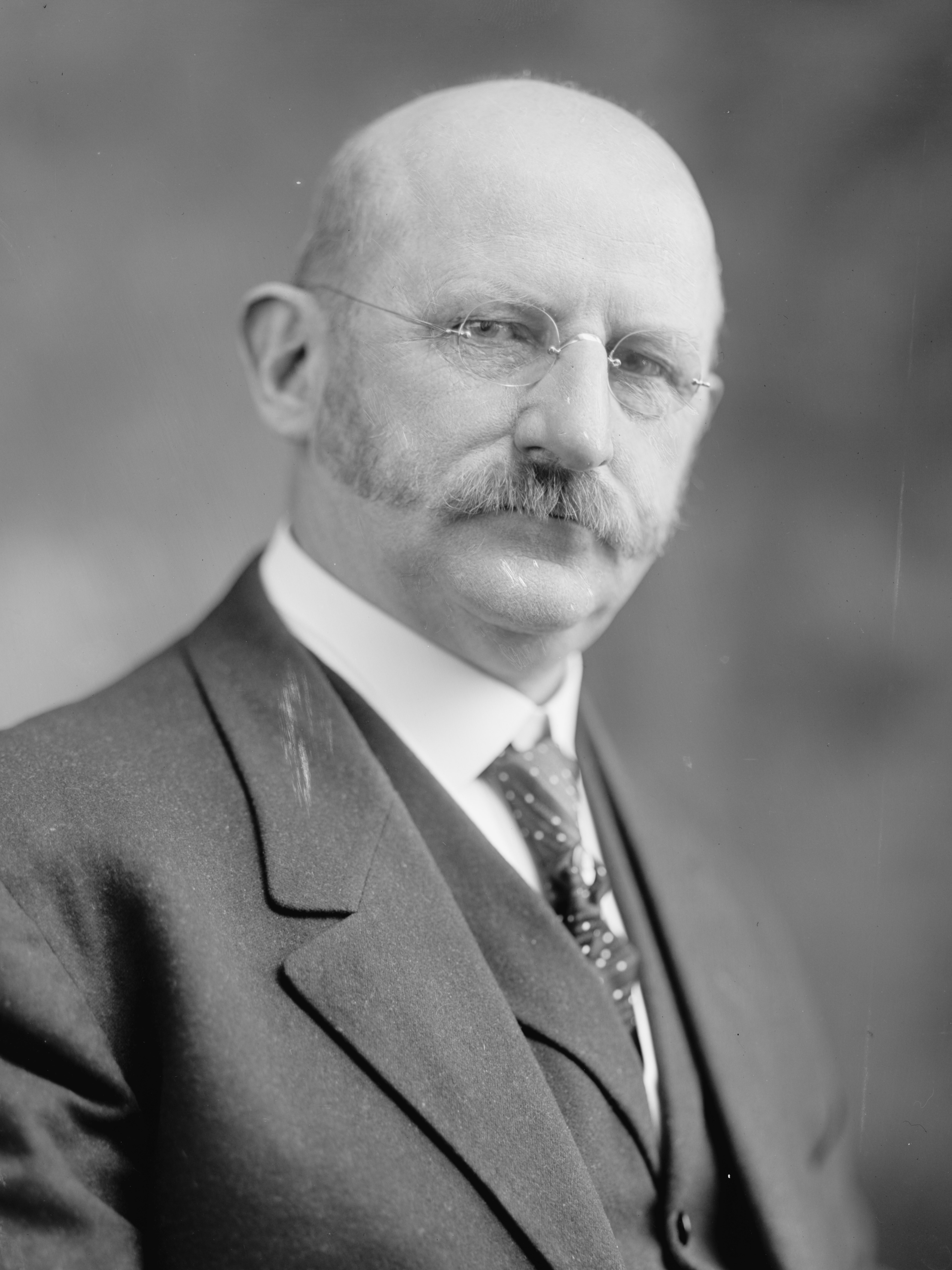

Member of the U.S. House of Representatives from Colorado's 1st district
- In office March 4, 1913 – March 3, 1915
- Preceded by: Atterson W. Rucker
- Succeeded by: Benjamin Hilliard

Personal details
- Born: George John Kindel; March 2, 1855 Cincinnati, Ohio, US
- Died: February 28, 1930 (aged 74) Brush, Colorado, US
- Resting place: Fairmount Cemetery, Denver, Colorado
- Party: Democratic

George John Kindel (March 2, 1855 – February 28, 1930) was an American politician from Colorado who served one term in the United States House of Representatives from 1913 to 1915.

== Biography ==
Born in Cincinnati, Ohio, Kindel attended the public schools and St. Augustine's School in Cincinnati. Beginning in 1871, he apprentice as an upholsterer and mattress maker before relocating to Denver, Colorado in 1877. He worked throughout his career in the upholstery, mattress, and furniture business.

== Political career ==
He served as a member of the board of supervisors of the city and county of Denver from 1910 to 1914.

In 1912, Kindel won election as a Democrat to the Sixty-third Congress, which convened from March 4, 1913 to March 3, 1915. In 1914, rather than seek re-election, Kindel instead ran for the U.S. Senate, first as a Democratic candidate and then, after leaving the party, as an independent. In a field of five candidates, Kindel placed fifth, receiving 4.5% of the vote.

== Death ==
After leaving Congress, he resumed his former business pursuits in Colorado.

He was in an automobile accident near Hillrose, Colorado, which resulted in his death in Brush, Colorado, on February 28, 1930. He was interred in Fairmount Cemetery, Denver, Colorado.

== Electoral history ==
1910 United States House of Representatives elections, Colorado's 1st district
Party	Candidate	Votes	%
Democratic	Atterson W. Rucker (incumbent)	40,458	40.77%
Republican	James C. Burger	37,966	38.26%
Prohibition	George John Kindel	17,144	17.28%
Socialist	John W. Martin	3,661	3.69%
Majority		2,492	2.51%
Total votes		99,229	100%
Democratic hold			

1912 United States House of Representatives elections, Colorado's 1st district
Party	Candidate	Votes	%
Democratic	George John Kindel	54,504	45.84%
Progressive	W. J. Crank	30,121	25.33%
Republican	Rice W. Means	24,887	20.93%
Socialist	John W. Martin	6,757	5.68%
Prohibition	Otto A. Reinhardt	2,642	2.22%
Majority		24,383	20.51%
Total votes		118,911	100%
Democratic hold			

1914 United States Senate election in Colorado
Party	Candidate	Votes	%
Democratic	Charles S. Thomas (inc.)	102,037	40.30%
Republican	Hubert Work	98,728	38.99%
Progressive	Benjamin Griffith	27,042	10.68%
Socialist	J. C. Griffiths	13,943	5.51%
Kindel Commercial Equality	George J. Kindel	11,433	4.52%
Total votes		253,183	100.00%
Democratic hold			

U.S. House of Representatives
Preceded by Atterson W. Rucker	Member of the U.S. House of Representatives from Colorado's 1st congressional district March 4, 1913 - March 3, 1915	Succeeded by Benjamin Hilliard
