= Luella Twining =

American journalist, labor organizer and Socialist politician

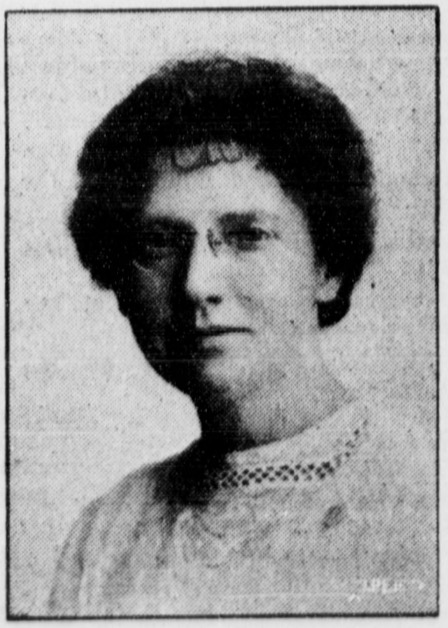
Luella Twining in 1913

Luella Twining (November 14, 1871 - December 22, 1939) was a journalist, labor organizer and Socialist politician. Twining presided over the ratification meeting during the first convention of the Industrial Workers of the World, representing the American Federal Union. At this convention she was a major advocate of a May 1st "labor day" holiday for workers, stating "We do not want a capitalist Labor Day. Let us have a labor day of our own. Let us have an international labor day, the first day of May."

Twining was known as "The Joan of Arc of the working class" in the early part of the 20th century, a title she shared with Elizabeth Gurley Flynn. Twining organized 18,000 women during a general strike in Philadelphia.

She was on the payroll of the Western Federation of Miners in 1907-1908 as a solicitor of the defense and frequently would speak on labor topics as their representative. She toured the country with Bill Haywood, as his manager, in 1908. She was also a sought-after public speaker on topics such as class conflict and improvement of labor conditions for women. She wrote for many labor and socialist papers including writing about the Cherry Mine Disaster and other topics for the Appeal to Reason newspaper.

== Political activities ==
In 1906 she ran for the U.S. Congress from Colorado, as a Socialist. In 1910 she was a delegate to the International Socialist Conference in Copenhagen, Denmark. She was elected to the Women's National Committee of the Socialist party in 1912. She ran for election in California's 6th congressional district in 1916 and 1918 as a Socialist.

In 1921 she was living in Berkeley, California and rented a room to the scholar Alfred Korzybski. By 1930 she was living in Santa Monica, California, where she would live the rest of her life. Her census profile describes her as a writer of books.

== Personal life ==
Twining was born in 1871 in Washington, Iowa to Edward and Florence Conger Twining. She died in Santa Monica, California of cancer in 1939.
