= Gabe Evans =

American politician (born 1986)

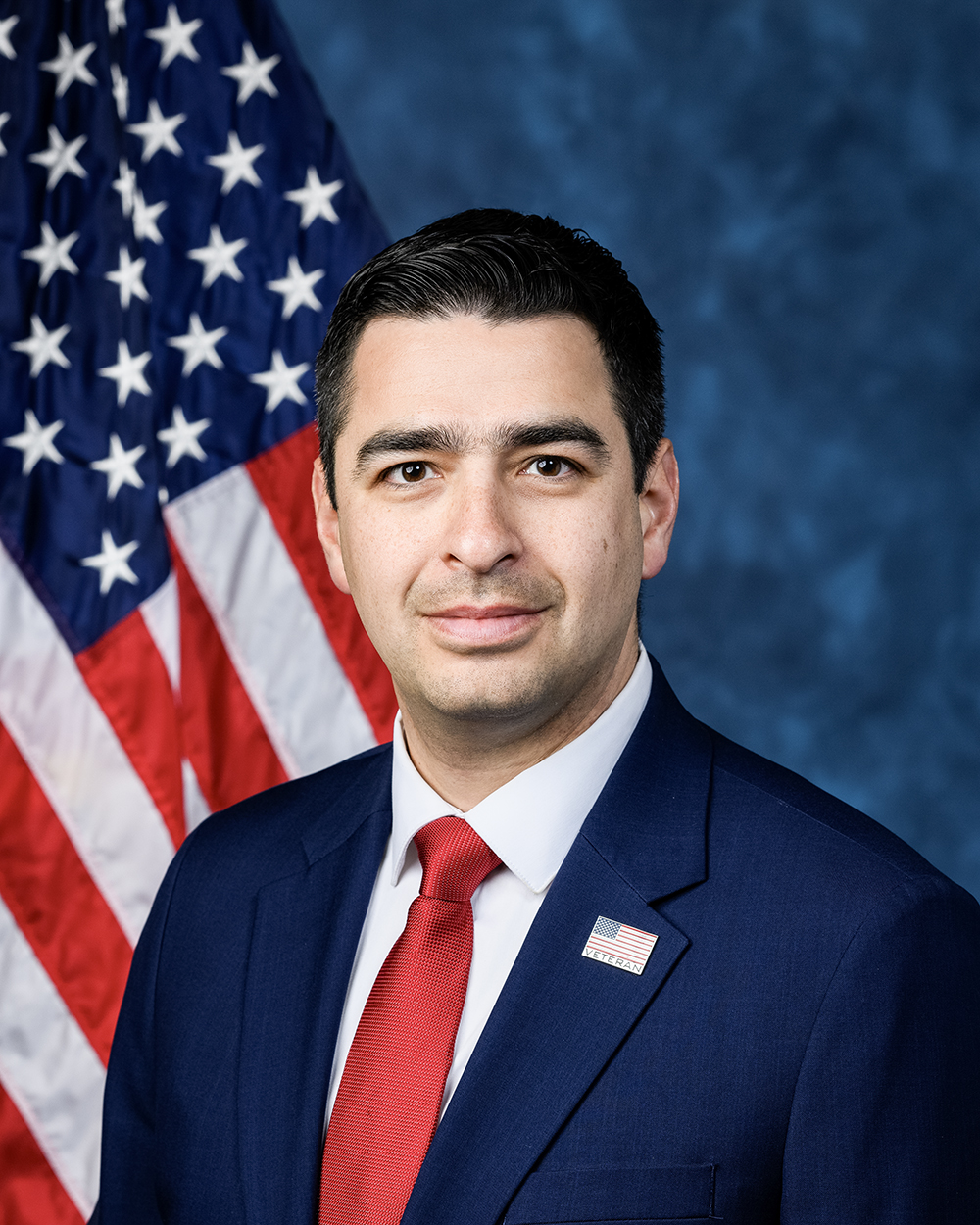
- Official portrait, 2025

Member of the U.S. House of Representatives from Colorado's 8th district
- Incumbent
- Assumed office January 3, 2025
- Preceded by: Yadira Caraveo

Member of the Colorado House of Representatives from the 48th district
- In office January 9, 2023 – January 2, 2025
- Preceded by: Tonya Van Beber
- Succeeded by: Carlos Barron

Personal details
- Born: Timothy Gabriel Joseph Evans; July 28, 1986 (age 40) Aurora, Colorado, U.S.
- Party: Republican
- Spouse: Anne Garboczi (m. 2010)
- Children: 2
- Education: Patrick Henry College (BA)
- Website: House website Campaign website

Military service
- Branch/service: United States Army
- Years of service: 2007–2019
- Rank: Captain
- Unit: Virginia Army National Guard; Colorado Army National Guard
- Battles/wars: War in Afghanistan; Operation Enduring Freedom
- Police career
- Department: Arvada Police Department
- Service years: 2011–2022
- Rank: Lieutenant

Timothy Gabriel Joseph Evans (born July 28, 1986) is an American politician, former law enforcement officer, and former U.S. Army officer serving as the U.S. representative for Colorado's 8th congressional district since 2025. A member of the Republican Party, Evans was previously a member of the Colorado House of Representatives from 2023 to 2025.

Evans was first elected to Congress in 2024, narrowly defeating incumbent Democrat Yadira Caraveo by a margin 0.73%. He lost reelection in 2026 to Democrat Manny Rutinel.

== Early life and education ==
Evans is the grandson of Mexican immigrants.

He earned his bachelor's degree in government from Patrick Henry College.

== Military service and career ==
Evans's military service includes two years in the Virginia Army National Guard from 2007 to 2009. After that, in 2009, he earned a commission as a second lieutenant in the United States Army, while also joining and serving in the Colorado National Guard from 2009 to 2019. He served in Operation Enduring Freedom from 2012 to 2013 and reached the rank of captain. He was honorably discharged in 2019.

In 2011, while serving in the Colorado National Guard, Evans joined the Arvada Police Department. He reached the rank of lieutenant, and he retired in January 2022 to run for office.

== Colorado House of Representatives ==
In the 2022 Colorado House of Representatives election, Evans received 63.31% of the total votes cast.

Evans has focused his tenure on criminal justice issues. He has sponsored bills aimed at "ensuring public employees get time off for National Guard service and studying whether judicial personnel are being properly trained on how to work with crime victims."

== U.S. House of Representatives ==
=== Elections ===
==== 2024 ====
On September 6, 2023, Evans announced his candidacy for the Republican nomination to represent Colorado's 8th congressional district in the 2024 elections. Evans was endorsed by 2024 Republican presidential nominee Donald Trump. He defeated former state Representative Janak Joshi in the Republican primary. He defeated the Democratic incumbent Yadira Caraveo in the November 2024 general election.

Evans fired his campaign's political director, Jessica Spindle, on September 11, 2024, after The Colorado Times Recorder reported on Spindle's history of promoting political violence, QAnon conspiracy theories, and antisemitism online.

=== Tenure ===
Evans voted in favor of the Laken Riley Act.

In April 2025, two of Evans' bills advanced through U.S. House committees. The first bill, the Law Enforcement Support and Counter Transnational Repression Accountability Act, would educate the public on transnational repression, which refers to foreign governments silencing or harming diaspora people who advocate for human rights and democracy in their former homelands. The second bill, the Expediting Federal Broadband Deployment Reviews Act, would "streamline the permitting process and help broadband providers reach rural and underserved communities."

In February 2026, Evans voted to keep the tariffs implemented against Canada.

In June 2026, Evans opposed the war powers resolution to end the Iran war.

=== Committee assignments ===
- Committee on Energy and Commerce
  - Subcommittee on Energy
  - Subcommittee on Environment
  - Subcommittee on Trade
- Committee on Homeland Security
  - Subcommittee on Emergency Management and Technology
  - Subcommittee on Counterterrorism, Law Enforcement, and Intelligence

=== Caucus membership ===
- Problem Solvers Caucus
- Republican Main Street Partnership
- Republican Governance Group

== Political positions ==
=== Abortion ===
Evans said the issue of whether to ban access to abortion should be left up to states, but that he believes abortion should be banned except in cases of rape, incest, or when a mother's life is at risk. He opposes a nationwide abortion ban.

=== AI data centers ===
Evans proposed the Ratepayer Protection Act. The bill would require the companies behind AI data centers to pay for their own additional electricity costs, instead of passing the costs to consumers. The bill passed the House of Representatives by a 417-3 margin in September 2026. CNBC said the bill "received broad, bipartisan support, though some environmental and anti-data center groups argued it doesn't go far enough to rein in developers." The bill failed to pass the Senate, due to opposition from Senate Democrats.

=== Foreign policy ===
In March 2026, after the second Trump administration launched the 2026 Iran War, Evans said he was concerned that the Trump administration would send ground troops to the Middle East. Evans also said he did not want to restrain Trump, "if you paint a hard line and say, ‘We’re absolutely not going to do this,’ you’ve taken that off the table as a negotiating point."

=== Healthcare ===
In January 2026, Evans voted against extending the Affordable Care Act enhanced tax credits.

=== Immigration ===
Evans said the Deferred Action for Childhood Arrivals program should remain in place and that people who received deportation protections under that initiative should not be deported.

== Personal life ==
Evans is married to Anne Evans (née Garboczi), an author and counselor. They have two sons and reside on their ranch in Fort Lupton. He is a Protestant.

== Electoral history ==
2024 Colorado's 8th congressional district election
| Party | Candidate | Votes | % |
|---|---|---|---|
| Republican | Gabe Evans | 163,320 | 49.0 |
| Democratic | Yadira Caraveo (incumbent) | 160,871 | 48.2 |
| Approval Voting | Chris Baum | 5,741 | 1.7 |
| Unity | Susan Hall | 3,677 | 1.1 |
| Write-in | | 7 | 0.0 |
| Total votes | | 333,616 | 100.0 |
| Republican gain from Democratic | | | |

2022 Colorado House of Representatives election, 48th District
| Party | Candidate | Votes | % |
|---|---|---|---|
| Republican | Gabe Evans | 20,011 | 63.31 |
| Democratic | Spring Erickson | 10,730 | 33.95 |
| Libertarian | Eric E. Joss | 866 | 2.74 |
| Total votes | | 31,607 | 100.0 |

== See also ==
- List of Hispanic and Latino Americans in the United States Congress

U.S. House of Representatives
| Preceded by Yadira Caraveo | Member of the U.S. House of Representatives from Colorado's 8th congressional district 2025–present | Incumbent |
U.S. order of precedence (ceremonial)
| Preceded by Sarah Elfreth | United States representatives by seniority 377th | Succeeded by Julie Fedorchak |
