= Adam Frisch =

American politician (born 1967)

Member of the Aspen City Council
- In office 2011–2019

Personal details
- Born: Adam Bennett Frisch; October 1, 1967 (age 59)
- Party: Democratic (since 2003)
- Spouse: Katie Frisch (m. 2003)
- Children: 2
- Education: University of Colorado Boulder
- Website: Campaign website

Adam Bennett Frisch (born October 1, 1967) is an American politician and member of the Democratic Party. He served on the Aspen City Council from 2011 to 2019 and chaired Pitkin County's financial review committee from 2005 to 2011.

Frisch was the 2022 Democratic nominee in Colorado's 3rd congressional district against Republican incumbent Lauren Boebert, which he lost by 554 votes and a margin of 0.16%. The narrow result was surprising to many political pundits who had expected Boebert to win by a larger margin. In February 2023, Frisch announced his second campaign for the same seat in 2024. Boebert switched districts and Frisch lost to Republican Jeff Hurd.

== Early life and education ==
Frisch was born in 1967 to a Jewish family. Frisch's family lived on the Fort Peck Indian Reservation in Montana until he was five years old. The family moved to Minneapolis, Minnesota, where they attended a Conservative synagogue. His father was an obstetrician-gynecologist and later worked for Planned Parenthood five years before retiring. Frisch was involved in ski racing from a young age but had to give it up after sustaining an injury. He graduated from the University of Colorado Boulder, in 1990 with a degree in economics.

== Early career ==
After college, Frisch waited tables in Manhattan before becoming a currency trader for 10 years. He has traveled extensively around the world.

In 2003, he moved to Colorado. He chaired Pitkin County's financial review committee from 2005 to 2011. He then served on the Aspen City Council from 2011 to 2019. During that period he was instrumental in sending a development referendum to voters, known as "Lift One", which barely passed. The development project, fronted by a member of the Gorsuch family split the community, affected the credibility of the local newspaper, The Aspen Times, and raised questions about the developers.

== 2022 U.S. House campaign ==
In 2022, he won the Democratic nomination for a House seat in Colorado's 3rd congressional district by 300 votes. Frisch traveled throughout the state, covering more than 3,000 miles and visiting 102 venues during the last days of the campaign. He appealed to Colorado Western Slope's rural populations with his family's roots in the west (his great-grandfather started a cattle ranch, which remains in the family). The New York Times wrote that Frisch characterized his challenger, Lauren Boebert, "as a flamethrower in an increasingly polarized Congress, who he said was more focused on placating the Republican Party's far-right Trump wing than reducing inflation and adding jobs".

On the campaign trail, he repeatedly characterized Boebert as "part of the 'angertainment industry,' crediting the expression to his middle and high school buddy, current Minnesota Democratic Rep. Dean Phillips".

During this campaign The Denver Post wrote Adam Frisch, then an Aspen city councilman, reversed his support for a proposed Lyft pilot program after Aspen taxi operator Todd Gardner claimed he blackmailed Frisch with video footage allegedly showing him arriving for an extramarital affair. Frisch denies both the affair and the blackmail allegation, asserting his vote change reflected public opposition and procedural concerns. He was not the swing vote in the final decision. Gardner's claim was Boebert's main form of attack against Frisch during the campaign.

The election was the closest of national-level races in the election-cycle. Frisch led in vote-count from election night on for several weeks. It was eventually determined by a state-mandated recount on December 12 that Boebert had won by 554 votes out of more than 325,000 votes cast, or by a 0.16 percent margin.

On November 18, 2022, he conceded the race and incumbent Republican challenger Boebert declared victory. It was the closest race in the 2022 midterm cycle. Frisch reacted to the final tally by stating, we "showed the nation that extremist politicians are not invincible".

== 2024 U.S. House campaign ==
On February 14, 2023, Frisch announced that he would run again for the United States House of Representatives against Lauren Boebert. The Colorado Sun wrote that this would be "one of the nation's most closely watched 2024 congressional contests". On April 1, Frisch received the state Democratic Party's "Rising Star" award at its Obama Gala. After six weeks of campaigning, Frisch had raised $1.7 million from 48,000 donations from across the U.S. Frisch's early campaign funds were reported as a million dollars more than the $667,000 raised by Boebert in the first three months of 2023. By mid-April, a poll of 3rd Congressional District voters showed Frisch and Boebert evenly matched at 45% each.

Boebert switched races, and Jeff Hurd won the Republican nomination for Colorado's 3rd district. Hurd defeated Frisch to win the November election.

== Political positions ==
Frisch has referred to himself "as a pro-business, pro-energy, moderate, pragmatic Democrat", who supports legal abortion, renewable energy along with oil and gas drilling, and more water storage for the Colorado Western Slope.

Following President Joe Biden announcing his student loan forgiveness plan, Frisch's campaign released a statement opposing it. Frisch also opposes widespread action on federal student debt relief.

On July 2, 2024, Frisch called for Joe Biden to withdraw from the 2024 United States presidential election.

== Personal life ==
Frisch and his wife, Katie, live in Aspen, Colorado. The couple, who have two children, were married in Vail in 2003. Katie Frisch was president of the Aspen School Board. She lost relection in 2023.

== Electoral history ==
2022 Colorado's 3rd Congressional District Democratic primary
Party	Candidate	Votes	%
Democratic	Adam Frisch	25,750	42.41
Democratic	Sol Sandoval	25,460	41.93
Democratic	Alex Walker	9,507	15.66
Total votes		60,717	100.0

2022 Colorado's 3rd congressional district general election
Party	Candidate	Votes	%
Republican	Lauren Boebert (incumbent)	163,832	50.08
Democratic	Adam Frisch	163,278	49.92
Total votes		327,110	100.0
Republican hold			

2024 Colorado's 3rd congressional district election
Party	Candidate	Votes	%
Republican	Jeff Hurd	201,951	50.8
Democratic	Adam Frisch	182,147	45.8
Libertarian	James Wiley	10,734	2.7
Unity	Adam Withrow	2,721	0.7
Total votes		397,553	100.0
Republican hold			
