= Colorado's 8th congressional district =

U.S. House district for Colorado

- Interactive map of district boundaries since January 3, 2023
- Representative: Gabe Evans; R–Fort Lupton
- Population (2025): 775,398
- Median household income: $98,902
- Ethnicity: 51.7% White; 38.5% Hispanic; 3.6% Two or more races; 3.3% Asian; 1.8% Black; 1.0% other
- Cook PVI: EVEN

Colorado's 8th congressional district is a congressional district in the U.S. state of Colorado. The district was apportioned after the 2020 United States census. The first congressional seat to be added to Colorado's congressional delegation since 2001, the 8th district was drawn before the 2022 elections. The district was drawn by the Colorado Independent Redistricting Commission and approved in an 11–1 vote on September 28, 2021, before being approved unanimously by the Colorado Supreme Court on November 1, 2021. It has been represented by Republican Gabe Evans since 2025.

The district is one of seven with a Cook Partisan Voting Index of EVEN, meaning that the district votes almost identically to the national electorate. It was also identified as a presidential bellwether district by Sabato's Crystal Ball, having voted for the Electoral College winner in the past five presidential elections as of 2024.

== Characteristics ==
Colorado's 8th congressional district stretches along Interstate 25, encompassing sections of Adams County, Larimer County, and Weld County. The largest population centers are Brighton, Commerce City, Greeley, Johnstown, Northglenn, and Thornton. The district has the largest number of Hispanic residents of any congressional district in Colorado, making up 38.5% of the adult population. The 8th congressional district is viewed as competitive, with the Democratic Party holding a 3% lead in active registered voters and an average margin of victory of 1.3% between eight statewide elections held between 2016 and 2020. Joe Biden won the area that is now the 8th district by 4.7% in the 2020 United States presidential election. Republicans are strongest in Greeley and Weld County, while the northern Denver suburbs in Adams County lean Democratic.

== Recent election results from statewide races ==
Year	Office	Results
2008	President	Obama 54% - 44%
2008	Senate	Udall 54% - 41%
2010	Senate	Buck 48% - 46%
2010	Governor	Hickenlooper 47% - 10%
2010	Secretary of State	Gessler 50% - 41%
2010	Treasurer	Stapleton 52% - 48%
2010	Attorney General	Suthers 57% - 43%
2012	President	Obama 54% - 46%
2014	Senate	Gardner 49% - 44%
2016	President	Trump 46% - 45%
2016	Senate	Bennet 48% - 46%
2018	Governor	Polis 49% - 47%
2018	Attorney General	Brauchler 49% - 47%
2020	President	Biden 51% - 46%
2020	Senate	Hickenlooper 49% - 48%
2022	Senate	Bennet 50% - 46%
2022	Governor	Polis 53% - 44%
2022	Secretary of State	Griswold 50% - 46%
2022	Treasurer	Young 50% - 46%
2022	Attorney General	Weiser 50% - 48%
2024	President	Trump 50% - 48%

== Composition ==
For the 118th and successive Congresses (based on redistricting following the 2020 census), the district contains all or portions of the following counties and communities:

Adams County (15)

Berkley, Brighton (shared with Weld County), Commerce City, Derby, Federal Heights, Lochbuie (shared with Weld County), Northglenn, North Washington, Shaw Heights, Sherrelwood, Thornton (shared with Weld County), Todd Creek, Twin Lakes, Welby, Westminster (part; also 7th; shared with Jefferson County)

Larimer County (1)

Berthoud (share with Weld County), Johnstown (shared with Weld County)

Weld County (18)

Aristocrat Ranchettes, Berthoud (share with Larimer County), Brighton (shared with Adams County), Dacono, Evans, Firestone, Fort Lupton, Frederick, Garden City, Gilcrest, Greeley, Johnstown (shared with Larimer County), Kersey, LaSalle, Lochbuie (shared with Adams County), Mead, Milliken, Thornton (shared with Adams County), Platteville

== List of members representing the district ==
Name	Party	Years	Cong– ress	Electoral history	District location
District created January 3, 2023
Yadira Caraveo (Thornton)	Democratic	January 3, 2023 – January 3, 2025	118th	Elected in 2022. Lost re-election.	2023–present Parts of Adams, Larimer, and Weld
Gabe Evans (Fort Lupton)	Republican	January 3, 2025 – present	119th	Elected in 2024. Lost re-election.	2023–present Parts of Adams, Larimer, and Weld
Manny Rutinel (Commerce City)	Democratic	Assuming office on January 3, 2027		Elected in 2026.	2023–present Parts of Adams, Larimer, and Weld

== Election results ==
=== 2022 ===
2022 Colorado's 8th congressional district election
Party	Candidate	Votes	%
Democratic	Yadira Caraveo	114,377	48.38%
Republican	Barbara Kirkmeyer	112,745	47.69%
Libertarian	Richard Ward	9,280	3.93%
Total votes		236,402	100%
Democratic win (new seat)			

=== 2024 ===
2024 Colorado's 8th congressional district election
Party	Candidate	Votes	%
Republican	Gabe Evans	163,320	48.95%
Democratic	Yadira Caraveo (incumbent)	160,871	48.22%
Approval Voting	Chris Baum	5,741	1.72%
Unity	Susan Hall	3,677	1.10%
Write-in		7	0.00%
Total votes		333,616	100%
Republican gain from Democratic			

== See also ==
- Colorado's congressional districts
- List of United States congressional districts
