= Jeff Hurd =

American politician (born 1979)

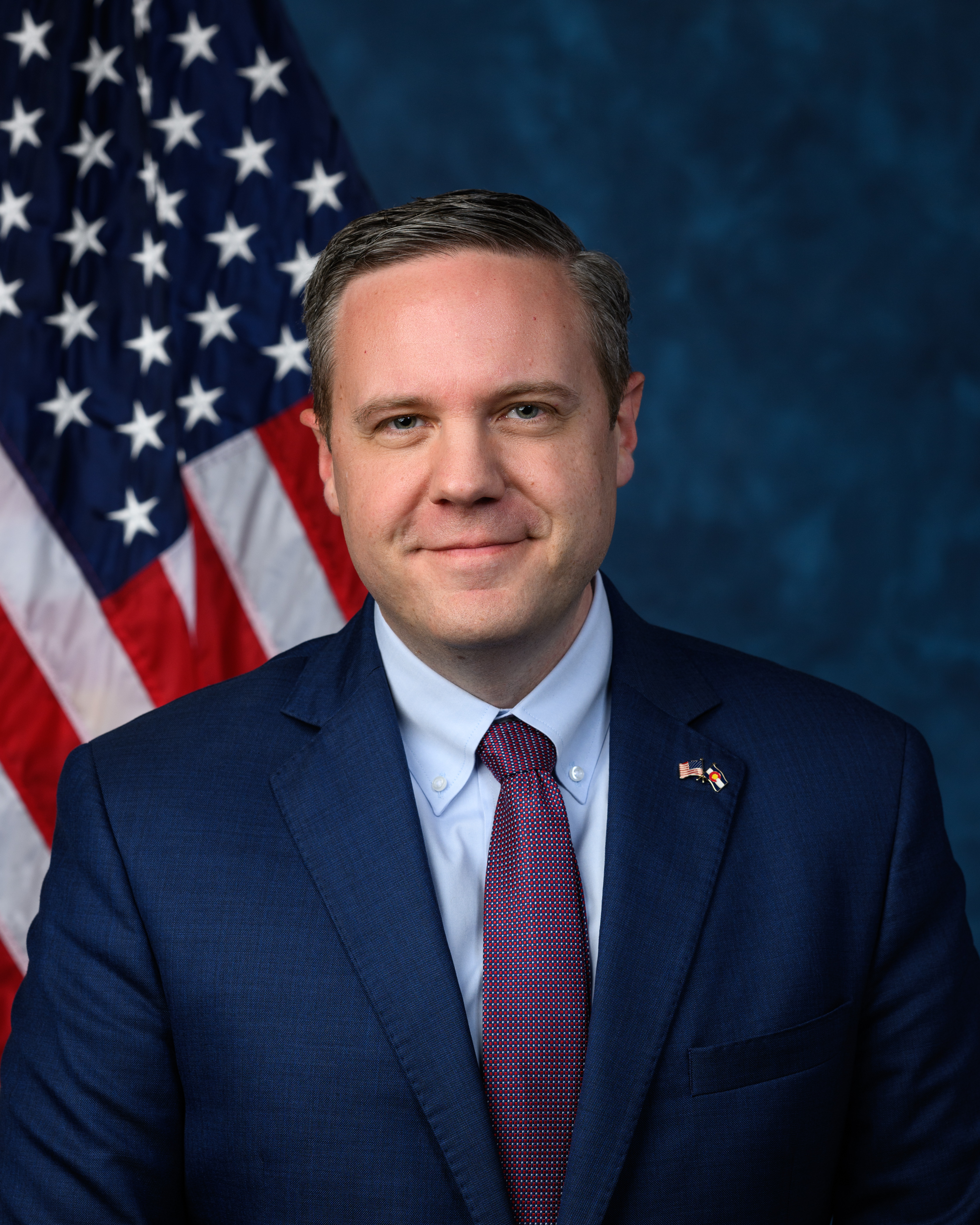
- Official portrait, 2024

Member of the U.S. House of Representatives from Colorado's 3rd district
- Incumbent
- Assumed office January 3, 2025
- Preceded by: Lauren Boebert

Personal details
- Born: Jeffrey Stephen Hurd; August 15, 1979 (age 47) Grand Junction, Colorado, U.S.
- Party: Republican
- Spouse: Barbora Hurd
- Children: 5
- Education: University of Notre Dame (BA); University of Denver (JD); Columbia University (LLM)
- Website: House website Campaign website

Jeffrey Stephen Hurd (born August 15, 1979) is an American politician and lawyer from Colorado. A member of the Republican Party, he represents Colorado's 3rd congressional district in the United States House of Representatives.

Hurd was first elected to Congress in 2024. He is a member of the moderate Republican Governance Group. Starting in 2027, Hurd will be the sole Republican in Colorado's congressional delegation.

== Early life and career ==
Hurd is the oldest of three sons. He was raised in Grand Junction, Colorado. His father was a psychologist who counseled low-income families. His mother died of cancer while he was in high school.

Hurd graduated from Grand Junction High School and earned a bachelor's degree in philosophy from the University of Notre Dame. After college, he worked for the Grand Junction Area Chamber of Commerce and then attended the University of Denver Law School, where he earned a Juris Doctor. Hurd clerked for Timothy Tymkovich, the chief judge of the United States Court of Appeals for the Tenth Circuit, and then joined an international law firm based in New York City. He moved back to Grand Junction in 2014 to start his own law firm, then joined Ireland Stapleton Pryor & Pascoe, managing its Grand Junction office.

== U.S. House of Representatives ==
=== Elections ===
==== 2024 ====
Hurd declared his candidacy for the United States House of Representatives for Colorado's 3rd congressional district against Lauren Boebert in the 2024 elections. After Boebert switched races, Hurd won the Republican nomination, defeating state Representative Ron Hanks.

In contrast to Boebert, Hurd campaigned on being "as exciting as a bread sandwich." Hurd defeated Aspen City Councilman Adam Frisch to win the November election.

==== 2026 ====
Hurd ran for reelection in the 2026 election. He defeated Dwayne Romero in the general election.

=== Tenure ===
In April 2025, Hurd was one of a dozen moderate Republicans who wrote a letter to Republican leadership in the U.S. House urging them to preserve and strengthen Medicaid. Hurd and the other authors of the letter said they "cannot and will not support a final reconciliation bill that includes any reduction in Medicaid coverage for vulnerable populations." The letter contained reminders that its authors had helped deliver a Republican majority in the 2024 elections. Hurd was one of six Republicans who voted to rescind tariffs the Trump administration had imposed on Canada.

=== Committee assignments ===
- Committee on Natural Resources
  - Subcommittee on Energy and Mineral Resources
  - Subcommittee on Indian and Insular Affairs (Chair)
- Committee on Science, Space, and Technology
  - Subcommittee on Energy
  - Subcommittee on Environment
- Committee on Transportation and Infrastructure
  - Subcommittee on Aviation
  - Subcommittee on Highways and Transit
  - Subcommittee on Water Resources and Environment

=== Caucus memberships ===
- Republican Study Committee
- Main Street Caucus
- Congressional Western Caucus

== Personal life ==
Hurd and his wife, Barbora, have five children. They live in Grand Junction.

Hurd is a Catholic.

== Electoral history ==
Republican primary results
Party	Candidate	Votes	%
Republican	Jeff Hurd	36,505	41.2
Republican	Ron Hanks	25,211	28.4
Republican	Stephen Varela	8,638	9.8
Republican	Lew Webb	7,094	8.0
Republican	Curtis McCrackin	5,772	6.5
Republican	Russ Andrews	5,304	6.0
Total votes		88,524	100.0

2024 Colorado's 3rd congressional district election
Party	Candidate	Votes	%
Republican	Jeff Hurd	201,951	50.8
Democratic	Adam Frisch	182,147	45.8
Libertarian	James Wiley	10,734	2.7
Unity	Adam Withrow	2,721	0.7
Total votes		397,553	100.0
Republican hold			

U.S. House of Representatives
Preceded by Lauren Boebert	Member of the U.S. House of Representatives from Colorado's 3rd congressional district 2025–present	Incumbent
U.S. order of precedence (ceremonial)
Preceded by Mark Harris	United States representatives by seniority 390th	Succeeded by Brian Jack
