= Dwayne Romero =

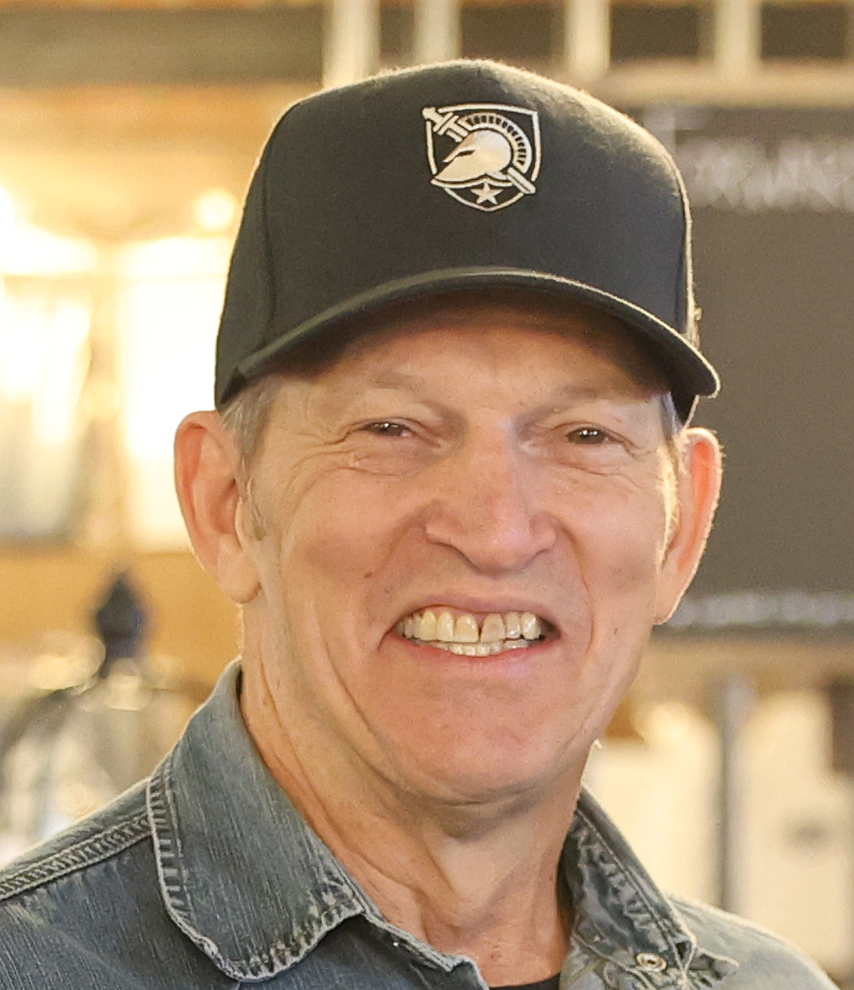

Personal details
- Born: 1964 or 1965 (age 61–62) Southeast Texas, U.S.
- Party: Democratic
- Education: United States Military Academy (BS); Harvard University (MBA)

Dwayne Romero (born 1964/1965) is an American politician from Colorado.

Romero is from southeast Texas, where he was raised by a single mother. He attended West Point Military Academy. Romero served in the United States Army with the Army Corps of Engineers for seven years. He served during the Gulf War and earned a Bronze Star Medal. He then attended Harvard Business School and earned a Master of Business Administration.

Romero moved to the Roaring Fork Valley to accept a job as a property manager and moved to Aspen, Colorado, in 2004. He was elected to the city council for Aspen in 2007 as an independent politician. He resigned in 2011 when he was named director of the Colorado Office of Economic Development by Governor John Hickenlooper. In 2013, he was appointed to a vacant seat on the Aspen City Council.

In March 2026, Romero announced his candidacy for the United States House of Representatives in Colorado's 3rd congressional district in the 2026 elections as a member of the Democratic Party. He defeated Alex Kelloff to win the nomination but lost the general election to Jeff Hurd.
