= 2024 United States House of Representatives elections in Colorado =

- November 5, 2024

All 8 Colorado seats to the United States House of Representatives
	Majority party	Minority party
Party	Democratic	Republican
Last election	5	3
Seats won	4	4
Seat change	▼1	▲1
Popular vote	1,667,163	1,306,086
Percentage	54.28%	42.52%
Swing	▼0.95%	▲0.01%

Democratic hold
Republican hold Republican gain
Democratic
40–50%
50–60%
60–70%
70–80%
Republican
40–50%
50–60%
60–70%
70–80%
80–90%

The 2024 United States House of Representatives elections in Colorado were held on November 5, 2024, to elect the eight U.S. representatives from the State of Colorado, one from each of the state's congressional districts. The elections coincided with the 2024 U.S. presidential election, other elections to the House of Representatives, elections to the United States Senate, and various state and local elections. The primary election took place on June 25, 2024.

Following the 2024 elections, the Democratic and Republican parties split the Colorado House of Representatives delegation, with four seats held by each party.

As a result of the Republicans picking up the eighth district, the Democratic Party lost its majority in Colorado's U.S. House delegation, which they had held since 2018.

== Overview ==
=== Statewide ===
Party	Candi- dates	Votes		Seats		
Party	Candi- dates	No.	%	No.	+/–	%
Democratic Party	8	1,667,213	54.25%	4	▼1	50%
Republican Party	8	1,306,086	42.50%	4	▲1	50%
Libertarian Party	6	48,577	1.58%	0	Steady	0%
Unity Party	6	20,933	0.68%	0	Steady	0%
Approval Voting Party	5	20,678	0.67%	0	Steady	0%
Independent	1	4,094	0.13%	0	Steady	0%
American Constitution Party	1	4,006	0.13%	0	Steady	0%
Forward Party	1	1,627	0.05%	0	Steady	0%
Write-ins	–	177	0.01%	0	Steady	0%
Total	36	3,073,391	100%	8	Steady	100%

Popular vote
Democratic	54.25%
Republican	42.50%
Libertarian	1.58%
Other	1.67%

House seats
Democratic	50.00%
Republican	50.00%

=== District ===
District	Democratic		Republican		Others		Total		Result
District	Votes	%	Votes	%	Votes	%	Votes	%	Result
District 1	264,606	76.53%	74,598	21.58%	6,531	1.89%	345,735	100.0%	Democratic hold
District 2	284,994	68.36%	120,633	28.94%	11,281	2.71%	416,908	100.0%	Democratic hold
District 3	182,147	45.82%	201,951	50.80%	13,455	3.38%	397,553	100.0%	Republican hold
District 4	188,249	42.04%	240,213	53.64%	19,345	4.32%	447,807	100.0%	Republican hold
District 5	147,972	40.87%	197,924	54.66%	16,189	4.47%	362,085	100.0%	Republican hold
District 6	202,686	58.97%	132,174	38.45%	8,861	2.58%	343,721	100.0%	Democratic hold
District 7	235,688	55.33%	175,273	41.15%	15,005	3.52%	425,966	100.0%	Democratic hold
District 8	160,871	48.22%	163,320	48.95%	9,425	2.83%	333,616	100.0%	Republican gain
Total	1,667,213	54.25%	1,306,086	42.50%	100,092	3.26%	3,073,391	100.0%	

== District 1 ==
2024 Colorado's 1st congressional district election
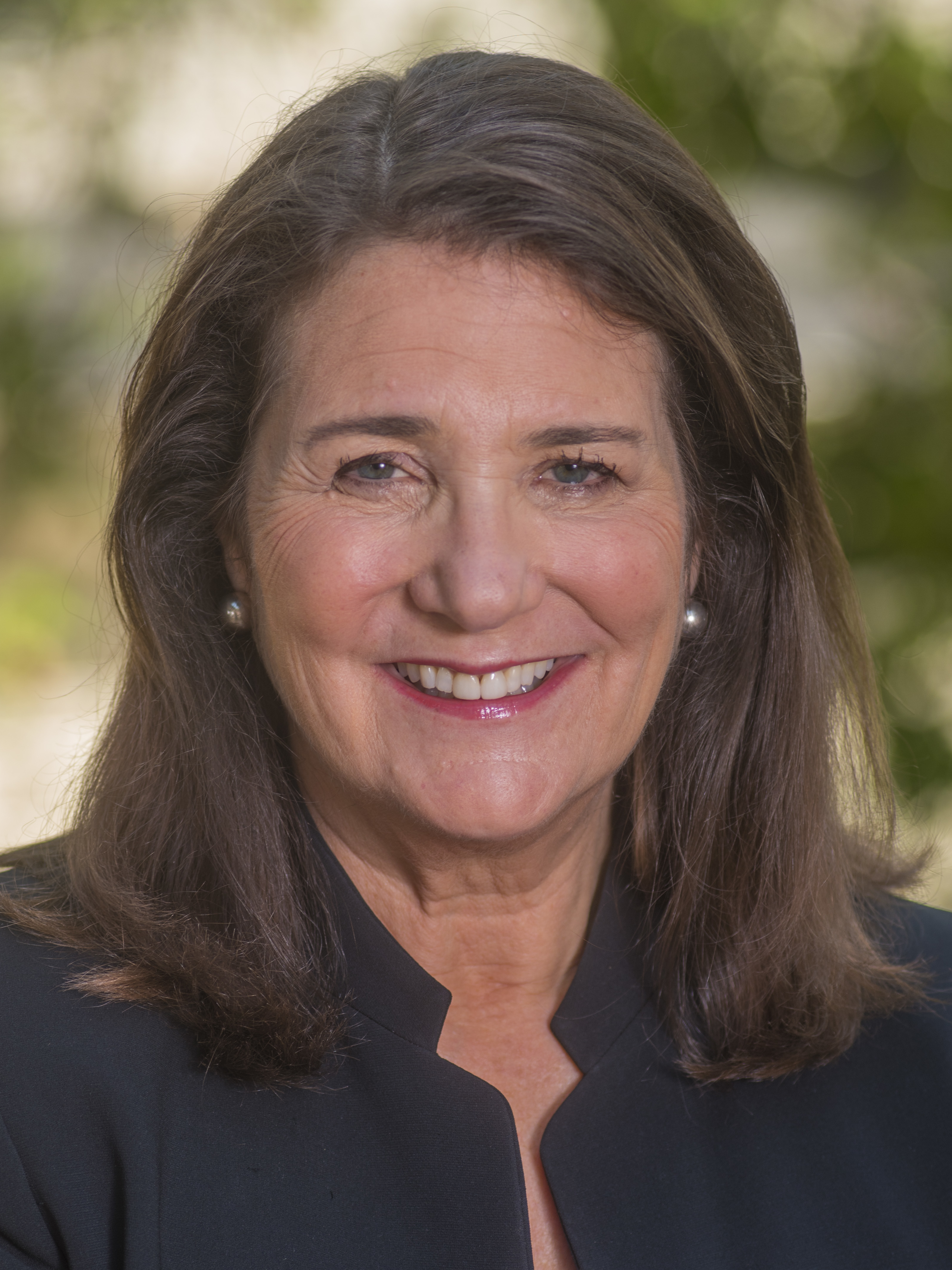

Nominee	Diana DeGette	Valdamar Archuleta
Party	Democratic	Republican
Popular vote	264,606	74,598
Percentage	76.53%	21.58%
- DeGette: 50–60% 60–70% 70–80% 80–90% No votes
U.S. Representative before election
Diana DeGette
Democratic
Elected U.S. Representative
Diana DeGette
Democratic

The 1st district includes almost all of Denver, as well as the enclaves of Glendale and Holly Hills. The incumbent was Democrat Diana DeGette, who was re-elected with 80.3% of the vote in 2022.

=== Democratic primary ===
==== Nominee ====
- Diana DeGette, incumbent U.S. representative

==== Endorsements ====
Diana DeGette

Organizations

- Feminist Majority PAC
- Humane Society Legislative Fund
- J Street PAC
- Joint Action Committee for Political Affairs
- Planned Parenthood Action Fund
- Population Connection Action Fund

Labor unions

- National Education Association

==== Fundraising ====
Campaign finance reports as of June 5, 2024
Candidate	Raised	Spent	Cash on hand
Diana DeGette (D)	$702,043	$669,440	$381,442
Source: Federal Election Commission

==== Results ====
Democratic primary results
Party	Candidate	Votes	%
Democratic	Diana DeGette (incumbent)	78,548	100.00%
Total votes		78,548	100.00%

=== Republican primary ===
==== Nominee ====
- Valdamar Archuleta, massage therapist and former president of Colorado Log Cabin Republicans

==== Endorsements ====
Valdamar Archuleta

Organizations

- Log Cabin Republicans PAC

==== Fundraising ====
Campaign finance reports as of June 5, 2024
Candidate	Raised	Spent	Cash on hand
Valdamar Archuleta (R)	$6,777	$4,291	$2,485
Source: Federal Election Commission

==== Results ====
Republican primary results
Party	Candidate	Votes	%
Republican	Valdamar Archuleta	11,421	100.00%
Total votes		11,421	100.00%

=== Independents and third-party candidates ===
==== Declared ====
- Morgan Law (Independent), nonprofit founder and construction worker
- Dom Waters (Unity Party), artist

=== General election ===
==== Predictions ====
Source	Ranking	As of
The Cook Political Report	Solid D	July 28, 2023
Sabato's Crystal Ball	Solid D	June 8, 2023
Inside Elections	Safe D	September 15, 2023
Elections Daily	Safe D	June 8, 2023
CNalysis	Solid D	November 16, 2023

==== Results ====
2024 Colorado's 1st congressional district election
Party	Candidate	Votes	%
Democratic	Diana DeGette (incumbent)	264,606	76.53%
Republican	Valdamar Archuleta	74,598	21.58%
Unity	Critter Milton	4,084	1.18%
Approval Voting	Daniel Lutz	2,351	0.68%
Write-in		96	0.02%
Total votes		345,735	100.00%
Democratic hold			

===== Results by county =====
County	Diana DeGette Democratic		Valdamar Archuleta Republican		Various candidates Other parties		Margin		Total votes cast
County	#	%	#	%	#	%	#	%	Total votes cast
Arapahoe (part)	2,406	72.60%	836	25.23%	72	2.17%	1,570	47.37%	3,314
Denver (part)	262,200	76.57%	73,758	21.54%	6,459	1.89%	188,442	55.03%	342,417
Jefferson (part)	0	0.00%	4	100.00%	0	0.00%	-4	-100.00%	4
Total	264,606	76.53%	74,598	21.58%	6,531	1.88%	190,008	54.95%	345,735

== District 2 ==
2024 Colorado's 2nd congressional district election
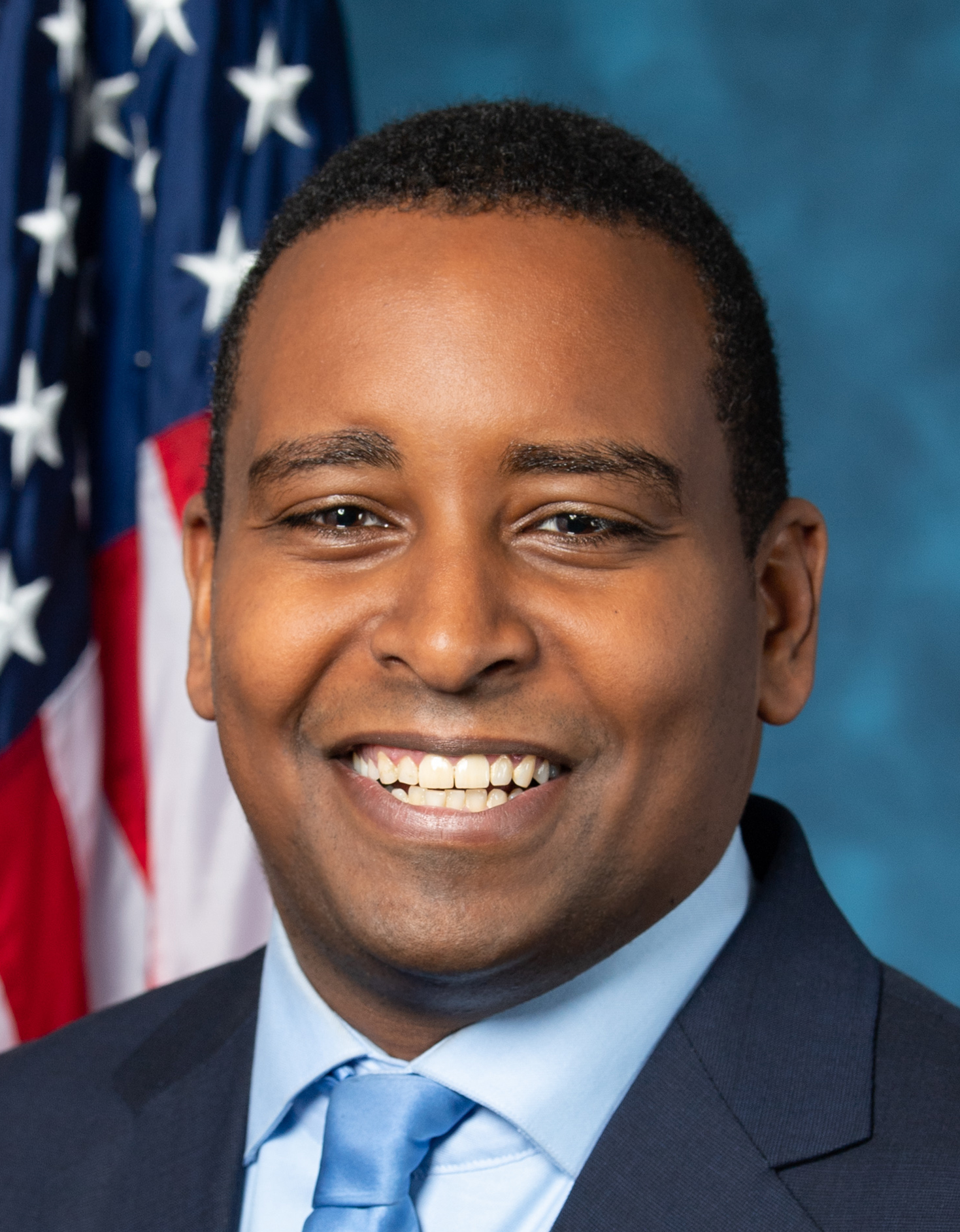

Nominee	Joe Neguse	Marshall Dawson
Party	Democratic	Republican
Popular vote	284,994	120,633
Percentage	68.36%	28.94%
- Neguse: 40–50% 50–60% 60–70% 70–80% 80–90% >90% Dawson: 40–50% 50–60% 60–70% 70–80% 80–90% No votes
U.S. Representative before election
Joe Neguse
Democratic
Elected U.S. Representative
Joe Neguse
Democratic

The 2nd district is located in north-central Colorado, including the northwestern Denver suburbs, such as Boulder and Fort Collins. The incumbent was Democrat Joe Neguse, who was re-elected with 70.0% of the vote in 2022.

=== Democratic primary ===
==== Nominee ====
- Joe Neguse, incumbent U.S. representative

==== Endorsements ====
Joe Neguse

U.S. representatives

- Gabby Giffords, U.S. representative from Arizona's 8th congressional district (2007–2012)
- Seth Moulton, U.S. representative from Massachusetts's 6th congressional district (2015–present)

Organizations

- AIPAC
- Everytown for Gun Safety Action Fund
- Feminist Majority PAC
- Giffords
- Humane Society Legislative Fund
- J Street PAC
- League of Conservation Voters
- Natural Resources Defense Council
- Population Connection Action Fund
- Pro-Israel America

Labor unions

- National Education Association

==== Fundraising ====
Campaign finance reports as of June 5, 2024
Candidate	Raised	Spent	Cash on hand
Joe Neguse (D)	$1,537,908	$1,537,423	$1,861,324
Source: Federal Election Commission

==== Results ====
Democratic primary results
Party	Candidate	Votes	%
Democratic	Joe Neguse (incumbent)	91,218	100.00%
Total votes		91,218	100.00%

=== Republican primary ===
==== Nominee ====
- Marshall Dawson, firmware engineer and nominee for this district in 2022

==== Fundraising ====
Campaign finance reports as of June 5, 2024
Candidate	Raised	Spent	Cash on hand
Marshall Dawson (R)	$3,082	$4,119	$13,019
Source: Federal Election Commission

==== Results ====
Republican primary results
Party	Candidate	Votes	%
Republican	Marshall Dawson	30,825	100.00%
Total votes		30,825	100.00%

=== Libertarian convention ===
==== Nominated ====
- Gaylon Kent, hotel clerk and perennial candidate

=== General election ===
==== Predictions ====
Source	Ranking	As of
The Cook Political Report	Solid D	July 28, 2023
Sabato's Crystal Ball	Solid D	June 8, 2023
Inside Elections	Safe D	September 15, 2023
Elections Daily	Safe D	June 8, 2023
CNalysis	Solid D	November 16, 2023

==== Results ====
2024 Colorado's 2nd congressional district election
Party	Candidate	Votes	%
Democratic	Joe Neguse (incumbent)	284,994	68.36%
Republican	Marshall Dawson	120,633	28.94%
Libertarian	Gaylon Kent	5,180	1.24%
Unity	Cynthia Munhos de Aquino Sirianni	3,744	0.90%
Approval Voting	Jan Kok	2,349	0.56%
Write-in		8	0.00%
Total votes		416,908	100.00%
Democratic hold			

===== Results by county =====
County	Joe Neguse Democratic		Marshall Dawson Republican		Various candidates Other parties		Margin		Total votes cast
County	#	%	#	%	#	%	#	%	Total votes cast
Boulder	145,762	76.57%	39,641	20.82%	4,955	2.60%	106,121	55.75%	190,358
Clear Creek	3,290	56.50%	2,325	39.93%	208	3.57%	965	16.57%	5,823
Eagle (part)	12,979	60.33%	8,031	37.33%	504	2.34%	4,948	23.00%	21,514
Gilpin	2,187	55.19%	1,637	41.31%	139	3.51%	550	13.88%	3,963
Grand	4,587	48.06%	4,700	49.24%	258	2.70%	-113	-1.18%	9,545
Jackson	151	19.41%	599	76.99%	28	3.60%	-448	-57.58%	778
Jefferson (part)	755	59.08%	476	37.25%	47	3.68%	279	21.83%	1,278
Larimer (part)	86,324	63.16%	46,312	33.89%	4,037	2.95%	40,012	29.27%	136,673
Routt	9,689	61.60%	5,633	35.81%	408	2.59%	4,056	25.79%	15,730
Summit	11,284	67.01%	5,145	30.55%	411	2.44%	6,139	36.46%	16,840
Weld (part)	7,986	55.44%	6,134	42.58%	286	1.99%	1,852	12.86%	14,406
Total	284,994	68.36%	120,633	28.94%	11,281	2.70%	164,361	39.42%	416,908

== District 3 ==
2024 Colorado's 3rd congressional district election
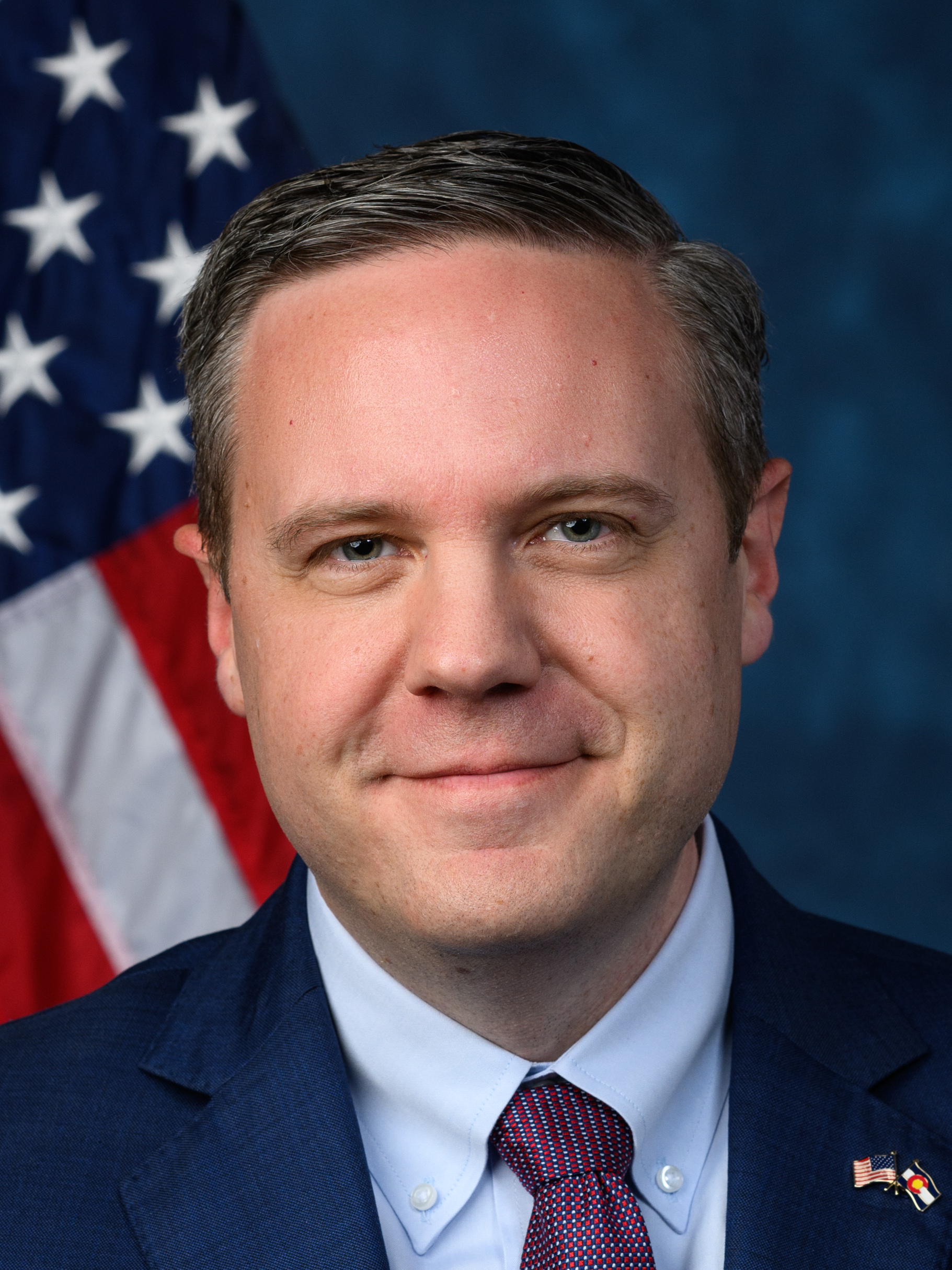

Nominee	Jeff Hurd	Adam Frisch
Party	Republican	Democratic
Popular vote	201,951	182,147
Percentage	50.79%	45.81%
- Hurd: 40–50% 50–60% 60–70% 70–80% 80–90% >90% Frisch: 40–50% 50–60% 60–70% 70–80% 80–90% Tie: 40–50% No votes
U.S. Representative before election
Lauren Boebert
Republican
Elected U.S. Representative
Jeff Hurd
Republican

The 3rd district encompasses the Colorado Western Slope, including the cities of Montrose, Pueblo, and Grand Junction. The incumbent was Republican Lauren Boebert, who was re-elected with 50.1% of the vote in 2022. Due to Boebert's narrow re-election in 2022, and her decreasing popularity, she dropped her bid in this district, and instead ran in the neighboring 4th district, which is more heavily Republican. Consequently, this seat became open.

=== Republican primary ===
==== Nominee ====
- Jeff Hurd, attorney

==== Eliminated in primary ====
- Russ Andrews, financial advisor
- Ron Hanks, former state representative from the 60th district (2021–2023), candidate for U.S. Senate in 2022, and nominee for California's 1st congressional district in 2010
- Curtis McCrackin, realtor
- Stephen Varela, member of the Colorado State Board of Education
- Lew Webb, retired businessman

==== Disqualified ====
- Joe Granado

==== Withdrawn ====
- Lauren Boebert, incumbent U.S. representative (ran in the 4th district)

==== Declined ====
- Don Coram, former state senator for the 6th district (2017–2023) and candidate for this district in 2022
- Matt Soper, state representative from the 54th district (2019–present)
- Perry Will, state senator from the 5th district (2023–2025)

==== Endorsements ====
Ron Hanks

U.S. representatives

- Tom Tancredo, former U.S. representative from Colorado's 6th congressional district (1999–2009) (previously endorsed Varela)

Political parties

- Colorado Republican Party
Jeff Hurd

U.S. executive branch officials

- Gale Norton, former U.S. secretary of the interior (2001–2006)

U.S. senators

- Hank Brown, former U.S. senator from Colorado (1991–1997)

U.S. representatives

- Bob Beauprez, former U.S. representative from Colorado's 7th congressional district (2003–2007)
- Scott McInnis, former U.S. representative from this district (1993–2005)
- Scott Tipton, former U.S. representative from this district (2011–2021)

Statewide officials

- Scott Gessler, former Colorado secretary of state (2011–2015)
- Jane Norton, former lieutenant governor of Colorado (2003–2007)
- Bill Owens, former governor of Colorado (1999–2007)
- Walker Stapleton, former Colorado state treasurer (2011–2019)
- John Suthers, former attorney general of Colorado (2005–2015) and former mayor of Colorado Springs (2015–2023)

State legislators

- Bob Gardner, state senator from the 7th district (2017–present)
- Barbara Kirkmeyer, state senator from the 23rd district (2021–present)
- Larry Liston, state senator from the 7th district (2021–present)
- Paul Lundeen, minority leader of the Colorado Senate (2023–present) from the 9th district (2019–present)
- Janice Rich, state senator from the 7th district (2023–present)

Local officials

- Ty Gates, Rio Blanco County commissioner (2020–present)

Individuals

- Bryce Benson, former president of the University of Colorado (2008–2019)

Organizations

- Americans for Prosperity

Newspapers

- The Gazette
Stephen Varela

U.S. representatives

- ~~Tom Tancredo, former U.S. representative from Colorado's 6th congressional district (1999–2009)~~ (switched endorsement to Hanks)

Organizations

- With Honor Fund

==== Fundraising ====
Campaign finance reports as of June 5, 2024
Candidate	Raised	Spent	Cash on hand
Russ Andrews (R)	$423,270 (Note: $311,255 of this total was self-funded by Andrews.)	$403,522	$19,747
Ron Hanks (R)	$22,910 (Note: $5,000 of this total was self-funded by Hanks.)	$7,438	$15,472
Jeff Hurd (R)	$1,067,662	$847,969	$219,692
Curtis McCrackin (R)	$73,039 (Note: $20,000 of this total was self-funded by McCrackin.)	$70,694	$0
Stephen Varela (R)	$263,886	$163,546	$100,340
Lew Webb (R)	$193,550 (Note: $150,000 of this total was self-funded by Webb.)	$149,927	$43,622
Source: Federal Election Commission

==== Polling ====
Poll source	Date(s) administered	Sample size (Note: Key: A – all adults RV – registered voters LV – likely voters V – unclear)	Margin of error	Russ Andrews	Ron Hanks	Jeffrey Hurd	Curtis McCrackin	Stephen Varela	Lew Webb	Undecided
co/efficient (R)	June 4, 2024	1,110 (LV)	± 3.1%	3%	9%	27%	2%	5%	3%	52%

==== Results ====
Republican primary results by county: Hurd: 30–40%; 40–50%; 50–60% 60–70%; Hanks: 30–40%; 40–50%; Webb: 30–40%; Andrews: 30–40%; Tie: 30–40%

Republican primary results
Party	Candidate	Votes	%
Republican	Jeff Hurd	36,505	41.24%
Republican	Ron Hanks	25,211	28.48%
Republican	Stephen Varela	8,638	9.76%
Republican	Lew Webb	7,094	8.01%
Republican	Curtis McCrackin	5,772	6.52%
Republican	Russ Andrews	5,304	5.99%
Total votes		88,524	100.00%

=== Democratic primary ===
==== Nominee ====
- Adam Frisch, former Aspen city councilor and nominee for this district in 2022

==== Withdrew ====
- Debby Burnett, veterinarian and candidate for this district in 2022
- Anna Stout, mayor of Grand Junction
- Adam Withrow, contractor (running under the Unity Party)

==== Declined ====
- Sol Sandoval, Pueblo school board member and candidate for this district in 2022

==== Endorsements ====
Adam Frisch

Organizations

- Blue Dog Coalition
- DCCC Red to Blue
- Democratic Majority for Israel
- Forward Party
- Jewish Democratic Council of America
- Joint Action Committee for Political Affairs
- National Organization for Women PAC
- Planned Parenthood Action Fund
- Population Connection Action Fund
Anna Stout (withdrawn)

U.S. representatives

- Betsy Markey, former U.S. representative from Colorado's 4th congressional district (2009–2011)

State officials

- Meghan Lukens, state representative for the 26th district (2023–present)
- Dylan Roberts, state senator for the 8th district (2023–present)

==== Fundraising ====
Campaign finance reports as of June 5, 2024
Candidate	Raised	Spent	Cash on hand
Adam Frisch (D)	$13,174,631	$9,769,839	$3,770,102
Source: Federal Election Commission

==== Results ====
Democratic primary results
Party	Candidate	Votes	%
Democratic	Adam Frisch	51,719	100.00%
Total votes		51,719	100.00%

=== Libertarian convention ===
==== Nominated ====
- James Wiley, executive director of the Colorado Libertarian Party

=== Unity Party ===
==== Declared ====
- Adam Withrow, contractor (previously ran as a Democrat)

==== Withdrawn ====
- Gary Swing, Colorado Unity Party state secretary, perennial candidate, and Natural Law nominee for this district in 2002 (ran for state senate)

=== General election ===
==== Predictions ====
Source	Ranking	As of
The Cook Political Report	Lean R	November 1, 2024
Sabato's Crystal Ball	Likely R	July 31, 2024
Inside Elections	Lean R	May 9, 2024
Elections Daily	Lean R	June 8, 2023
CNalysis	Lean R	August 6, 2024

==== Polling ====
Hypothetical polling

Lauren Boebert vs. Adam Frisch

Poll source	Date(s) administered	Sample size	Margin of error	Lauren Boebert (R)	Adam Frisch (D)	Undecided
Keating Research (Note: Poll sponsored by Frisch's campaign)	August 8–15, 2023	801 (LV)	± 3.5%	48%	50%	–
Global Strategy Group/Progress Colorado (D)	March 29 – April 2, 2023	830 (V)	± 4.9%	45%	45%	10%

==== Results ====
2024 Colorado's 3rd congressional district election
Party	Candidate	Votes	%
Republican	Jeff Hurd	201,951	50.79%
Democratic	Adam Frisch	182,147	45.81%
Libertarian	James Wiley	10,734	2.70%
Unity	Adam Withrow	2,721	0.68%
Total votes		397,553	100.00%
Republican hold			

===== Results by county =====
County	Jeff Hurd Republican		Adam Frisch Democratic		Various candidates Other parties		Margin		Total votes cast
County	#	%	#	%	#	%	#	%	Total votes cast
Alamosa	3,573	48.61%	3,525	47.96%	252	3.43%	48	0.65%	7,350
Archuleta	4,892	53.66%	3,928	43.09%	296	3.25%	964	10.57%	9,116
Conejos	2,053	51.29%	1,830	45.72%	120	3.00%	223	5.57%	4,003
Costilla	729	36.49%	1,201	60.11%	68	3.40%	-472	-23.62%	1,998
Delta	12,032	63.04%	6,171	32.33%	884	4.63%	5,861	30.71%	19,087
Dolores	992	71.47%	344	24.78%	52	3.52%	648	46.69%	1,388
Eagle (part)	1,512	30.41%	3,356	67.50%	104	2.09%	-1,844	-37.09%	4,972
Garfield	13,676	46.31%	14,963	50.67%	893	3.02%	-1,287	-4.36%	29,532
Gunnison	3,473	32.79%	6,747	63.69%	373	3.52%	-3,274	-30.90%	10,593
Hinsdale	321	54.13%	251	42.33%	21	3.54%	70	11.80%	593
Huerfano	2,094	47.85%	2,074	47.39%	208	4.75%	20	0.46%	4,376
La Plata	13,489	38.95%	20,133	58.13%	1,014	2.93%	-6,644	-19.18%	34,636
Las Animas	3,869	50.83%	3,476	45.67%	266	3.49%	393	5.16%	7,611
Mesa	52,693	58.63%	34,052	37.89%	3,127	3.48%	18,641	20.74%	89,872
Mineral	369	51.32%	329	45.76%	21	2.92%	40	5.56%	719
Moffat	4,908	75.64%	1,290	19.88%	291	4.48%	3,618	55.76%	6,489
Montezuma	8,527	57.92%	5,741	39.00%	453	3.08%	2,786	18.92%	14,721
Montrose	15,512	62.58%	8,321	33.57%	954	3.85%	7,191	29.01%	24,787
Otero	5,081	58.06%	3,434	39.24%	236	2.70%	1,647	18.82%	8,751
Ouray	1,530	37.94%	2,412	59.81%	91	2.26%	-882	-21.87%	4,033
Pitkin	2,703	24.78%	7,964	73.02%	239	2.19%	-5,261	-48.24%	10,906
Pueblo	39,243	46.82%	41,748	49.81%	2,824	3.37%	-2,505	-2.99%	83,815
Rio Blanco	2,848	78.52%	657	18.11%	122	3.36%	2,191	60.41%	3,627
Rio Grande	3,266	53.77%	2,572	42.34%	236	3.89%	694	11.43%	6,074
Saguache	1,323	40.73%	1,766	54.37%	159	4.90%	-443	-13.64%	3,248
San Juan	166	29.33%	372	65.72%	28	4.95%	-206	-36.39%	566
San Miguel	1,077	22.96%	3,490	74.41%	123	2.62%	-2,413	-51.45%	4,690
Total	201,951	50.79%	182,147	45.81%	13,455	3.38%	19,804	4.98%	397,553

== District 4 ==
2024 Colorado's 4th congressional district election
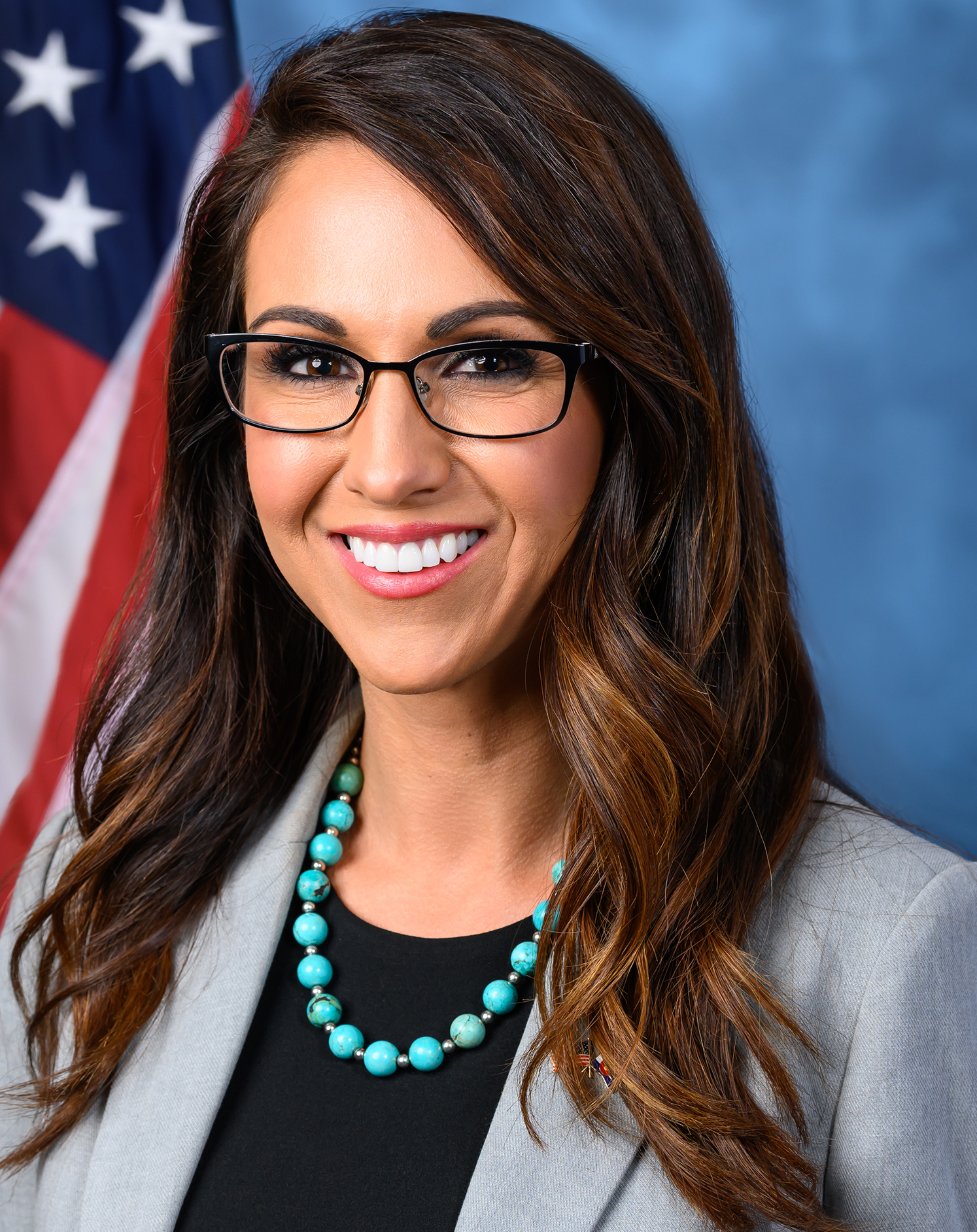

Nominee	Lauren Boebert	Trisha Calvarese
Party	Republican	Democratic
Popular vote	240,213	188,249
Percentage	53.64%	42.04%
- Boebert: 40–50% 50–60% 60–70% 70–80% 80–90% >90% Calvarese: 40–50% 50–60% 60–70% No votes
U.S. Representative before election
Greg Lopez
Republican
Elected U.S. Representative
Lauren Boebert
Republican

The 4th district encompasses rural eastern Colorado and the southern Denver exurbs, including Castle Rock and Parker. The incumbent was Republican Ken Buck, who was re-elected with 60.9% of the vote in 2022. He resigned from Congress on March 22. The new incumbent, Greg Lopez, who won the special election, did not seek re-election to a full term. Lauren Boebert won the election.

=== Republican primary ===
==== Nominee ====
- Lauren Boebert, U.S. representative from the 3rd district

==== Eliminated in primary ====
- Deborah Flora, radio host and candidate for U.S. Senate in 2022
- Richard Holtorf, state representative from the 63rd district (2019–2025)
- Mike Lynch, former minority leader of the Colorado House of Representatives (2023–2024) from the 65th district (2021–2025)
- Jerry Sonnenberg, Logan County commissioner from the 3rd district (2023–present) and former president pro tempore of the Colorado Senate (2017–2019) from the 1st district (2015–2023)
- Peter Yu, mortgage banker, nominee for the 2nd district in 2018, and candidate for U.S. Senate in 2022

==== Disqualified ====
- Floyd Trujillo, energy consultant and candidate for U.S. Senate in 2014

==== Eliminated at convention ====
- Ted Harvey, former state senator and candidate for the 6th district in 2008

==== Withdrawn ====
- Trent Leisy, Weld County councilor (ran for state house)

==== Declined ====
- George Brauchler, former Arapahoe County district attorney and nominee for attorney general in 2018 (ran for district attorney)
- Greg Brophy, former state senator and former chief of staff to incumbent Ken Buck
- Ken Buck, former U.S. representative
- Kristi Burton Brown, former chair of the Colorado Republican Party
- Heidi Ganahl, former at-large member of the University of Colorado Board of Regents and nominee for governor in 2022
- Jeff Hunt, director of Colorado Christian University's Centennial Institute
- Barbara Kirkmeyer, state senator for the 23rd district, candidate for this district in 2014, and nominee for the 8th district in 2022 (ran for re-election)
- Abe Laydon, Douglas County commissioner
- Greg Lopez, incumbent U.S. representative
- Scott Melbye, nuclear energy executive and candidate for this district in the June special election
- Steve Reams, Weld County sheriff
- George Teal, Douglas County commissioner
- Lora Thomas, Douglas County commissioner (ran for state house)

==== Endorsements ====
Lauren Boebert

Executive branch officials

- Donald Trump, 45th president of the United States (2017–2021)

U.S. representatives

- Mike Johnson, speaker of the U.S. House of Representatives (2023–present)

Organizations

- Campaign for Working Families
- Maggie's List
- Republicans for National Renewal
- Turning Point Action

Political parties

- Colorado Republican Party
Deborah Flora

Statewide officials

- Jane Norton, former lieutenant governor of Colorado (2003–2007)

Newspapers

- The Gazette
Richard Holtorf

Local officials

- Greg Lopez, former mayor of Parker, candidate for governor in 2018 and 2022, and nominee for this district in the June special election
Trent Leisy (withdrawn)

State legislators

- Vernon Jones, former Georgia state representative (2017–2021)

Individuals

- Gina Loudon, media personality
- Leo Terrell, civil rights attorney
Jerry Sonnenberg

U.S. senators

- Wayne Allard, former U.S. senator from Colorado (1997–2009)
- Hank Brown, former U.S. senator from Colorado (1991–1997)
- Cory Gardner, former U.S. senator from Colorado (2015–2021)

State legislators

- John Cooke, former minority leader of the Colorado Senate
- Byron Pelton, state senator from the 1st district (2023–present)

Local officials

- Frank McNulty, member of the University of Colorado Board of Regents from the 4th district

Newspapers

- Journal-Advocate
Ken Buck (declined to run)

Organizations

- AIPAC

==== Fundraising ====
Campaign finance reports as of June 5, 2024
Candidate	Raised	Spent	Cash on hand
Lauren Boebert (R)	$3,772,175	$3,862,103	$681,347
Deborah Flora (R)	$426,258	$308,722	$117,536
Richard Holtorf (R)	$152,937 (Note: $38,054 of this total was self-funded by Holtorf.)	$81,454	$71,482
Mike Lynch (R)	$96,462	$92,752	$3,709
Jerry Sonnenberg (R)	$356,178	$264,184	$91,994
Peter Yu (R)	$285,437 (Note: $250,000 of this total was self-funded by Yu.)	$12,716	$272,720
Source: Federal Election Commission

==== Debate ====
A Republican primary debate was held in Fort Lupton on January 25, 2024, featuring nine candidates, including Boebert, Flora, Holtorf, Leisy, Lynch, and Sonnenberg. When asked to raise their hands if they had ever been arrested, six of the candidates did, after which the audience cheered and Leisy gave Boebert and Lynch high fives. Boebert falsely claimed she had only been arrested once.

=== Polling ===
Poll source	Date(s) administered	Sample size	Margin of error	Lauren Boebert	Deborah Flora	Richard Holtorf	Mike Lynch	Peter Yu	Other	Undecided
Kaplan Strategies	May 31, 2024	343 (LV)	± 4.3%	40%	4%	4%	3%	5%	–	40%
Kaplan Strategies	February 24, 2024	558 (LV)	± 4.2%	32%	3%	3%	7%	3%	2% (Note: Trent Leisy and Chris Phelen with 1%; Floyd Trujillo with 0%)	49%

==== Results ====
Republican primary results by county: Boebert: 40–50%; 50–60%; 60–70%; Sonnenberg: 30–40%; 40–50%; 50–60%; 60–70%; Holtorf 60–70%

Republican primary results
Party	Candidate	Votes	%
Republican	Lauren Boebert (Note: Boebert was an incumbent congresswoman; however, she then represented Colorado's 3rd district. She sought election in the 4th district, which was then represented by Greg Lopez.)	54,605	43.66%
Republican	Jerry Sonnenberg	17,791	14.23%
Republican	Deborah Flora	17,069	13.65%
Republican	Richard Holtorf	13,387	10.70%
Republican	Mike Lynch	13,357	10.68%
Republican	Peter Yu	8,854	7.08%
Total votes		125,063	100.00%

=== Democratic primary ===
==== Nominee ====
- Trisha Calvarese, communications professional and nominee for this district in the June special election

==== Eliminated in primary ====
- Ike McCorkle, U.S. Marine Corps veteran and nominee for this district in 2020 and 2022
- John Padora, engineer

==== Withdrawn ====
- Karen Breslin, attorney, college professor, and candidate for U.S. Senate in 2022

==== Endorsements ====
John Padora

Organizations

- Freethought Equality Fund
- Vote Common Good
- Working Families Party

=== Polling ===
Poll source	Date(s) administered	Sample size	Margin of error	Karen Breslin	Trisha Calvarese	Ike McCorkle	John Padora	Undecided
Gravis Marketing (Note: Poll sponsored by McCorkle's campaign)	March 14–15, 2024	439 (LV)	± 4.7%	11%	2%	21%	9%	57%

Hypothetical polling

Trisha Calvarese vs. Ike McCorkle

Poll source	Date(s) administered	Sample size	Margin of error	Trisha Calvarese	Ike McCorkle	Undecided
Gravis Marketing	March 14–15, 2024	439 (LV)	± 4.7%	17%	32%	51%

Trisha Calvarese vs. John Padora

Poll source	Date(s) administered	Sample size	Margin of error	Trisha Calvarese	John Padora	Undecided
Gravis Marketing	March 14–15, 2024	439 (LV)	± 4.7%	18%	21%	61%

Ike McCorkle vs. John Padora

Poll source	Date(s) administered	Sample size	Margin of error	Ike McCorkle	John Padora	Undecided
Gravis Marketing	March 14–15, 2024	439 (LV)	± 4.7%	30%	20%	50%

==== Fundraising ====
Campaign finance reports as of June 5, 2024
Candidate	Raised	Spent	Cash on hand
Trisha Calvarese (D)	$139,081	$85,834	$53,247
Ike McCorkle (D)	$1,451,634	$1,303,462	$163,213
John Padora (D)	$313,743 (Note: $11,251 of this total was self-funded by Padora.)	$271,399	$42,344
Source: Federal Election Commission

==== Results ====
Democratic primary results
Party	Candidate	Votes	%
Democratic	Trisha Calvarese	22,756	45.19%
Democratic	Ike McCorkle	20,723	41.15%
Democratic	John Padora	6,882	13.67%
Total votes		50,361	100.00%

=== Libertarian convention ===
==== Nominated ====
- Hannah Goodman, chair of the Colorado Libertarian Party and nominee for this district in the June special election

=== General election ===
==== Predictions ====
Source	Ranking	As of
The Cook Political Report	Solid R	July 28, 2023
Sabato's Crystal Ball	Likely R	June 8, 2023
Inside Elections	Safe R	September 15, 2023
Elections Daily	Safe R	June 8, 2023
CNalysis	Solid R	November 16, 2023

==== Polling ====
Poll source	Date(s) administered	Sample size	Margin of error	Lauren Boebert (R)	Trisha Calvarese (D)	Undecided
Keating Research (Note: Poll sponsored by Calvarese's campaign)	April 18–24, 2024	500 (LV)	± 4.4%	46%	36%	18%

Hypothetical polling

Lauren Boebert vs. Ike McCorkle

Poll source	Date(s) administered	Sample size	Margin of error	Lauren Boebert (R)	Ike McCorkle (D)	Undecided
Gravis Marketing	May 22–24, 2024	423 (LV)	± 4.7%	27%	41%	33%
Gravis Marketing	March 27–29, 2024	529 (LV)	± 4.3%	31%	38%	30%

Jerry Sonnenberg vs. Ike McCorkle

Poll source	Date(s) administered	Sample size	Margin of error	Jerry Sonnenberg (R)	Ike McCorkle (D)	Undecided
Gravis Marketing	March 27–29, 2024	529 (LV)	± 4.3%	24%	18%	57%

==== Results ====
2024 Colorado's 4th congressional district election
Party	Candidate	Votes	%
Republican	Lauren Boebert	240,213	53.64%
Democratic	Trisha Calvarese	188,249	42.04%
Libertarian	Hannah Goodman	11,676	2.61%
Approval Voting	Frank Atwood	6,233	1.39%
Unity	Paul Noel Fiorino	1,436	0.32%
Total votes		447,807	100.00%
Republican hold			

===== Results by county =====
County	Lauren Boebert Republican		Trisha Calvarese Democratic		Various candidates Other parties		Margin		Total votes cast
County	#	%	#	%	#	%	#	%	Total votes cast
Adams (part)	4,988	68.35%	1,975	27.06%	335	4.59%	3,013	41.29%	7,298
Arapahoe (part)	9,412	46.76%	9,826	48.82%	891	4.43%	-414	-2.06%	20,129
Baca	1,523	78.83%	337	17.44%	72	3.73%	1,186	61.39%	1,932
Bent	1,310	62.26%	679	32.27%	115	5.47%	631	29.99%	2,104
Cheyenne	851	83.19%	144	14.08%	28	2.74%	707	69.11%	1,023
Crowley	1,129	67.97%	452	27.21%	80	4.82%	677	40.76%	1,661
Douglas (part)	112,701	48.23%	111,358	47.66%	9,595	4.11%	1,343	0.57%	233,654
El Paso (part)	3,882	77.07%	913	18.13%	242	4.80%	2,969	58.94%	5,037
Elbert	13,938	70.43%	4,955	25.04%	897	4.53%	8,983	45.39%	19,790
Kiowa	671	82.03%	115	14.06%	32	3.91%	556	67.97%	818
Kit Carson	2,867	79.62%	608	16.88%	126	3.50%	2,259	62.74%	3,601
Larimer (part)	31,057	45.68%	33,595	49.42%	3,331	4.90%	-2,538	-3.74%	67,983
Lincoln	1,861	75.47%	488	19.79%	117	4.74%	1,373	55.68%	2,466
Logan	7,000	71.60%	2,378	24.32%	398	4.07%	4,622	47.28%	9,776
Morgan	8,764	67.68%	3,644	28.14%	542	4.19%	5,120	39.54%	12,950
Phillips	1,704	75.36%	460	20.34%	97	4.29%	1,244	55.02%	2,261
Prowers	3,443	69.77%	1,306	26.46%	186	3.77%	2,137	43.31%	4,935
Sedgwick	910	70.93%	315	24.55%	58	4.52%	595	46.38%	1,283
Washington	2,173	80.87%	382	14.22%	132	4.91%	1,791	66.65%	2,687
Weld (part)	26,625	63.53%	13,406	31.99%	1,878	4.48%	13,219	31.54%	41,909
Yuma	3,404	75.48%	913	20.24%	193	4.28%	2,491	55.24%	4,510
Total	240,213	53.64%	188,249	42.04%	19,345	4.32%	51,964	11.60%	447,807

== District 5 ==
2024 Colorado's 5th congressional district election
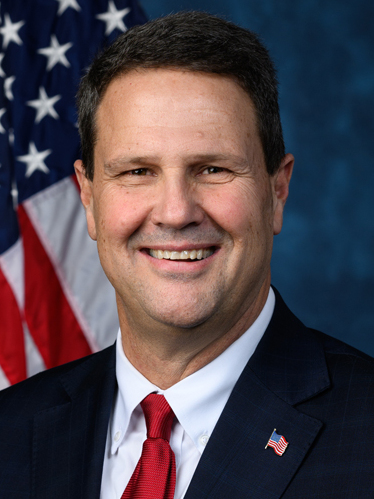

Nominee	Jeff Crank	River Gassen
Party	Republican	Democratic
Popular vote	197,924	147,972
Percentage	54.66%	40.87%
- Crank: 40–50% 50–60% 60–70% 70–80% 80–90% >90% Gassen: 40–50% 50–60% 60–70% 70–80% 80–90% No votes
U.S. Representative before election
Doug Lamborn
Republican
Elected U.S. Representative
Jeff Crank
Republican

The 5th district is centered on El Paso County and its suburbs, including Cimarron Hills and Fort Carson. The incumbent was Republican Doug Lamborn, who was re-elected with 56.0% of the vote in 2022. He was retiring.

=== Republican primary ===
==== Nominee ====
- Jeff Crank, talk radio host and candidate for this district in 2006 and 2008

==== Eliminated in primary ====
- Dave Williams, chair of the Colorado Republican Party (2023–2025), former state representative from the 15th district (2017–2023), and candidate for this district in 2022

==== Disqualified ====
- Bob Gardner, state senator from the 12th district (2017–2025)

==== Eliminated at convention ====
- Douglas Bruce, former state representative (2008–2009) and convicted felon
- Joshua Griffin, research and development firm founder

==== Declined ====
- Lauren Boebert, U.S. representative from the 3rd district (endorsed Williams, running in the 4th district)
- Dennis Hisey, former state senator from the 2nd district (2019–2023)
- Doug Lamborn, incumbent U.S. representative (endorsed Crank)
- Dan Nordberg, former state representative from the 14th district (2013–2018)
- Rose Pugliese, state representative from the 14th district (2023–2025)
- John Suthers, former attorney general of Colorado (2005–2015) and former mayor of Colorado Springs (2015–2023)
- Mark Waller, former state representative from the 15th district (2009–2015)
- Wayne Williams, former Colorado secretary of state (2015–2019) and runner-up for mayor of Colorado Springs in 2023 (endorsed Crank)
- Don Wilson, state representative from the 20th district (2022–2025)

==== Endorsements ====
Jeff Crank

U.S. senators

- Hank Brown, former U.S. senator from Colorado (1991–1997)
- Cynthia Lummis, U.S. senator from Wyoming (2021–present)

U.S. representatives

- Jim Banks, U.S. representative from Indiana's 3rd congressional district (2017–2025)
- Bob Beauprez, former U.S. representative from Colorado's 7th congressional district (2003–2007)
- Tom Emmer, U.S. representative from Minnesota's 6th congressional district (2015–present) and House majority whip (2023–present)
- Joel Hefley, former U.S. representative from Colorado's 5th congressional district (1987–2007)
- Ronny Jackson, U.S. representative from Texas's 13th congressional district (2021–present)
- Mike Johnson, U.S. representative from Louisiana's 4th congressional district (2017–present) and speaker of the House (2023–present)
- Doug Lamborn, incumbent U.S. representative for this district
- Mike Rogers, U.S. representative from Alabama's 3rd congressional district (2003–present)

Statewide officials

- Bill Owens, former governor of Colorado (1999–2007)
- Wayne Williams, former Colorado secretary of state (2015–2019)

Organizations

- Americans for Prosperity
- National Right to Life Committee
- Susan B. Anthony Pro-Life America
Dave Williams

Executive branch officials

- Donald Trump, 45th president of the United States (2017–2021)

U.S. representatives

- Lauren Boebert, U.S. representative from Colorado's 3rd congressional district
- Matt Gaetz, U.S. representative from Florida's 1st congressional district
- Bob Good, U.S. representative from Virginia's 5th congressional district
- Paul Gosar, U.S. representative from Arizona's 9th congressional district
- Mary Miller, U.S. representative from Illinois's 15th congressional district

Individuals

- James Dobson, founder of Focus on the Family

Organizations

- Citizens United PVF
- Colorado Republican Party
- House Freedom Fund
Doug Lamborn (declined to run)

Organizations

- AIPAC

==== Fundraising ====
Campaign finance reports as of June 5, 2024
Candidate	Raised	Spent	Cash on hand
Jeff Crank (R)	$510,396	$373,760	$136,635
Dave Williams (R)	$250,935 (Note: $100,000 of this total was self-funded by Williams.)	$102,545	$148,390
Source: Federal Election Commission

==== Results ====
Republican primary results
Party	Candidate	Votes	%
Republican	Jeff Crank	56,585	65.16%
Republican	Dave Williams	30,257	34.84%
Total votes		86,842	100.00%

=== Democratic primary ===
==== Nominee ====
- River Gassen, university research assistant

==== Eliminated in primary ====
- Joe Reagan, former director of outreach for Wreaths Across America

==== Endorsements ====
River Gassen

Organizations

- Working Families Party
Joe Reagan

Organizations

- WelcomePAC

==== Fundraising ====
Campaign finance reports as of June 5, 2024
Candidate	Raised	Spent	Cash on hand
River Gassen (D)	$58,370	$56,493	$6,028
Joe Reagan (D)	$39,911 (Note: $5,100 of this total was self-funded by Reagan.)	$25,659	$14,252
Source: Federal Election Commission

==== Results ====
Democratic primary results
Party	Candidate	Votes	%
Democratic	River Gassen	20,802	50.59%
Democratic	Joe Reagan	20,313	49.41%
Total votes		41,115	100.00%

=== Libertarian convention ===
==== Nominated ====
- Michael Vance, legislative director for the Colorado Libertarian Party

=== Third-party and independent candidates ===
==== Declared ====
- Joseph Gaye (Independent), retired financial manager
- Christopher Mitchell (Constitution), electrical engineer and nominee for this district in 2022
- Katrina Nguyen (Independent)
- Christopher Sweat (Forward), entrepreneur

==== Endorsements ====
Christopher Sweat

Political parties

- Forward Party

=== General election ===
==== Predictions ====
Source	Ranking	As of
The Cook Political Report	Solid R	July 28, 2023
Sabato's Crystal Ball	Safe R	June 26, 2024
Inside Elections	Safe R	September 15, 2023
Elections Daily	Safe R	June 8, 2023
CNalysis	Very Likely R	November 16, 2023

==== Results ====
2024 Colorado's 5th congressional district election
Party	Candidate	Votes	%
Republican	Jeff Crank	197,924	54.66%
Democratic	River Gassen	147,972	40.87%
Libertarian	Michael Vance	6,458	1.78%
Independent	Joseph Gaye	4,094	1.13%
American Constitution	Christopher Mitchell	4,006	1.11%
Forward	Christopher Sweat	1,627	0.45%
Write-in		4	0.00%
Total votes		362,085	100.00%
Republican hold			

===== Results by county =====
County	Jeff Crank Republican		River Gassen Democratic		Various candidates Other parties		Margin		Total votes cast
County	#	%	#	%	#	%	#	%	Total votes cast
El Paso (part)	197,924	54.66%	147,972	40.87%	16,189	4.47%	49,952	13.79%	362,085
Total	197,924	54.66%	147,972	40.87%	16,189	4.47%	49,952	13.79%	362,085

== District 6 ==
2024 Colorado's 6th congressional district election
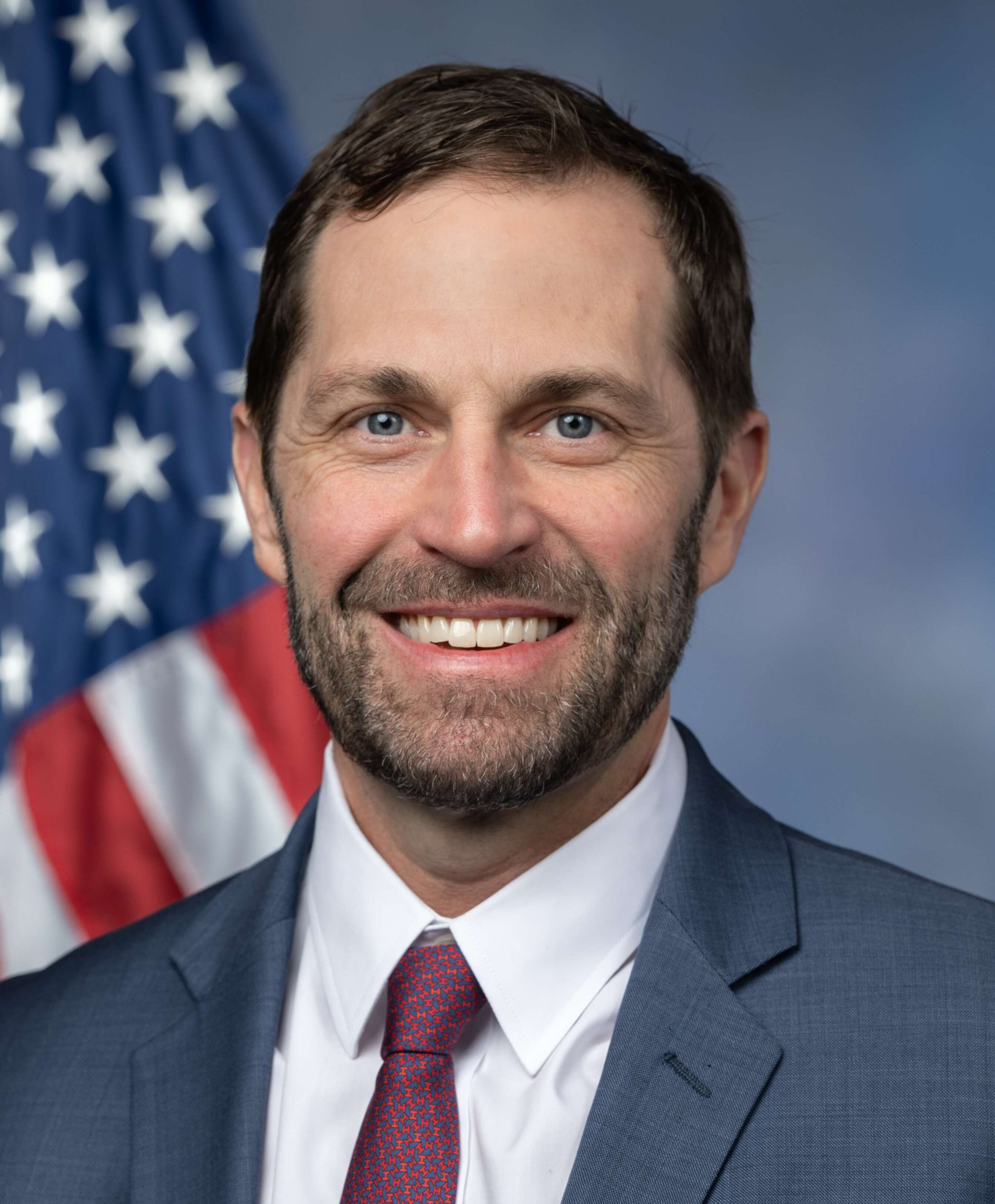

Nominee	Jason Crow	John Fabbricatore
Party	Democratic	Republican
Popular vote	202,686	132,174
Percentage	58.97%	38.45%
- Crow: 40–50% 50–60% 60–70% 70–80% Fabbricatore: 40–50% 50–60% 60–70% Tie: 40–50% No votes
U.S. Representative before election
Jason Crow
Democratic
Elected U.S. Representative
Jason Crow
Democratic

The 6th district takes in much of the eastern Denver metropolitan area, as well as parts of the southern and northern area. The incumbent was Democrat Jason Crow, who was re-elected with 60.1% of the vote in 2022.

=== Democratic primary ===
==== Nominee ====
- Jason Crow, incumbent U.S. representative

==== Endorsements ====
Jason Crow

U.S representatives

- Gabby Giffords, U.S. representative from Arizona's 8th congressional district (2007–2012)
- Seth Moulton, U.S. representative from Massachusetts's 6th congressional district (2015–present)

Organizations

- AIPAC
- Bend the Arc
- End Citizens United
- Everytown for Gun Safety Action Fund
- Giffords
- J Street PAC
- Joint Action Committee for Political Affairs
- Natural Resources Defense Council
- Population Connection Action Fund

Labor unions

- National Education Association

==== Fundraising ====
Campaign finance reports as of June 5, 2024
Candidate	Raised	Spent	Cash on hand
Jason Crow (D)	$1,435,939	$1,403,000	$1,614,223
Source: Federal Election Commission

==== Results ====
Democratic primary results
Party	Candidate	Votes	%
Democratic	Jason Crow (incumbent)	55,837	100.00%
Total votes		55,837	100.00%

=== Republican primary ===
==== Nominee ====
- John Fabbricatore, consultant and retired ICE agent

==== Fundraising ====
Campaign finance reports as of June 5, 2024
Candidate	Raised	Spent	Cash on hand
John Fabbricatore (R)	$60,453	$33,096	$27,356
Source: Federal Election Commission

==== Results ====
Republican primary results
Party	Candidate	Votes	%
Republican	John Fabbricatore	30,895	100.00%
Total votes		30,895	100.00%

=== Libertarian convention ===
==== Nominated ====
- John Kittleson, welding contractor and nominee for the 1st district in 2022

=== General election ===
==== Predictions ====
Source	Ranking	As of
The Cook Political Report	Solid D	July 28, 2023
Sabato's Crystal Ball	Solid D	June 8, 2023
Inside Elections	Safe D	September 15, 2023
Elections Daily	Safe D	June 8, 2023
CNalysis	Solid D	November 16, 2023

==== Results ====
2024 Colorado's 6th congressional district election
Party	Candidate	Votes	%
Democratic	Jason Crow (incumbent)	202,686	58.97%
Republican	John Fabbricatore	132,174	38.45%
Libertarian	John Kittleson	4,832	1.41%
Approval Voting	Travis Nicks	4,004	1.16%
Write-in		25	0.01%
Total votes		343,721	100.00%
Democratic hold			

===== Results by county =====
County	Jason Crow Democratic		John Fabbricatore Republican		Various candidates Other parties		Margin		Total votes cast
County	#	%	#	%	#	%	#	%	Total votes cast
Adams (part)	9,788	68.22%	4,118	28.70%	442	3.08%	5,670	39.52%	14,348
Arapahoe (part)	172,132	59.87%	108,013	37.57%	7,351	2.56%	64,119	22.30%	287,496
Denver (part)	496	75.73%	146	22.29%	13	1.98%	350	53.44%	655
Douglas (part)	1,776	51.21%	1,639	47.26%	53	1.53%	137	3.95%	3,468
Jefferson (part)	18,494	48.99%	18,258	48.36%	1,002	2.65%	236	0.63%	37,754
Total	202,686	58.97%	132,174	38.45%	8,861	2.58%	70,512	20.52%	343,721

== District 7 ==
2024 Colorado's 7th congressional district election
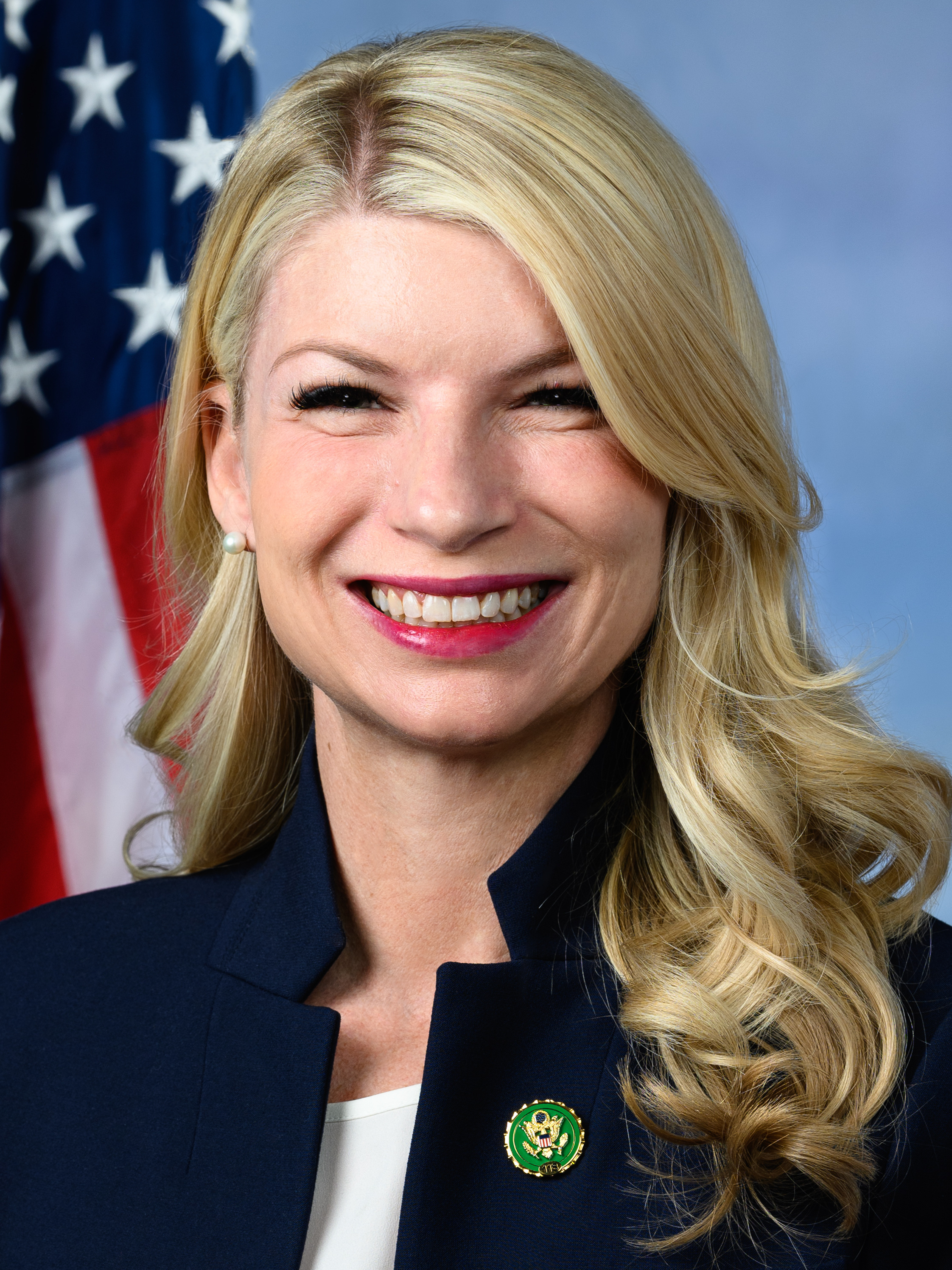

Nominee	Brittany Pettersen	Sergei Matveyuk
Party	Democratic	Republican
Popular vote	235,688	175,273
Percentage	55.33%	41.15%
- Pettersen: 40–50% 50–60% 60–70% 70–80% Matveyuk: 40–50% 50–60% 60–70% 70–80% 80–90% No votes
U.S. Representative before election
Brittany Pettersen
Democratic
Elected U.S. Representative
Brittany Pettersen
Democratic

The 7th district encompasses central Colorado, with a small part extending into the western Denver metropolitan area. The incumbent was Democrat Brittany Pettersen, who was elected with 56.4% of the vote in 2022.

=== Democratic primary ===
==== Nominee ====
- Brittany Pettersen, incumbent U.S. representative

==== Endorsements ====
Brittany Pettersen

Organizations

- AIPAC
- Democratic Majority for Israel
- EMILY's List
- Giffords
- Humane Society Legislative Fund
- J Street PAC
- Jewish Democratic Council of America
- Joint Action Committee for Political Affairs
- League of Conservation Voters
- Natural Resources Defense Council
- Planned Parenthood Action Fund

Labor unions

- National Education Association

==== Fundraising ====
Campaign finance reports as of June 5, 2024
Candidate	Raised	Spent	Cash on hand
Brittany Petterson (D)	$1,611,611	$730,899	$889,112
Source: Federal Election Commission

==== Results ====
Democratic primary results
Party	Candidate	Votes	%
Democratic	Brittany Pettersen (incumbent)	71,052	100.00%
Total votes		71,052	100.00%

=== Republican primary ===
==== Nominee ====
- Sergei Matveyuk, engineer

==== Fundraising ====
Campaign finance reports as of June 5, 2024
Candidate	Raised	Spent	Cash on hand
Sergei Matveyuk (R)	$10,354	$4,179	$6,174
Source: Federal Election Commission

==== Results ====
Republican primary results
Party	Candidate	Votes	%
Republican	Sergei Matveyuk	46,154	100.00%
Total votes		46,154	100.00%

=== Libertarian convention ===
==== Nominated ====
- Patrick Bohan, electrical engineer

==== Fundraising ====
Campaign finance reports as of March 31, 2024
Candidate	Raised	Spent	Cash on hand
Patrick Bohan (L)	$4,780	$1,680	$3,100
Source: Federal Election Commission

=== Independents and third-party candidates ===
==== Declared ====
- Ron Tupa (Independent), former Democratic state senator from the 18th district (2001–2009)

==== Fundraising ====
Campaign finance reports as of March 31, 2024
Candidate	Raised	Spent	Cash on hand
Ron Tupa (I)	$28,272 (Note: $13,000 of this total was self-funded by Tupa.)	$27,329	$942
Source: Federal Election Commission

=== General election ===
==== Predictions ====
Source	Ranking	As of
The Cook Political Report	Solid D	July 28, 2023
Sabato's Crystal Ball	Solid D	June 8, 2023
Inside Elections	Safe D	September 15, 2023
Elections Daily	Safe D	June 8, 2023
CNalysis	Solid D	November 16, 2023

==== Results ====
2024 Colorado's 7th congressional district election
Party	Candidate	Votes	%
Democratic	Brittany Pettersen (incumbent)	235,688	55.33%
Republican	Sergei Matveyuk	175,273	41.15%
Libertarian	Patrick Bohan	9,697	2.28%
Unity	Ron Tupa	5,271	1.24%
Write-in		37	0.01%
Total votes		425,966	100.00%
Democratic hold			

===== Results by county =====
County	Brittany Pettersen Democratic		Sergei Matveyuk Republican		Various candidates Other parties		Margin		Total votes cast
County	#	%	#	%	#	%	#	%	Total votes cast
Adams (part)	945	61.85%	517	33.84%	66	4.32%	428	28.01%	1,528
Broomfield	27,650	61.61%	15,912	35.45%	1,320	2.94%	11,738	26.16%	44,882
Chaffee	7,747	56.05%	5,580	40.37%	494	3.57%	2,167	15.68%	13,821
Custer	1,178	31.62%	2,452	65.81%	96	2.58%	-1,274	-34.19%	3,726
El Paso (part)	198	54.85%	157	43.49%	6	1.66%	41	11.36%	361
Fremont	7,514	30.73%	16,172	66.14%	765	3.13%	-8,658	-35.41%	24,451
Jefferson (part)	178,809	58.39%	116,297	37.98%	11,120	3.63%	62,512	20.41%	306,226
Lake	2,158	58.56%	1,312	35.60%	215	5.83%	846	22.96%	3,685
Park	4,688	40.20%	6,490	55.65%	485	4.16%	-1,802	-15.45%	11,663
Teller	4,798	30.72%	10,383	66.48%	438	2.80%	-5,585	-35.76%	15,619
Weld (part)	3	75.00%	1	25.00%	0	0.00%	2	50.00%	4
Total	235,688	55.33%	175,273	41.15%	15,005	3.53%	60,415	14.18%	425,966

== District 8 ==
2024 Colorado's 8th congressional district election
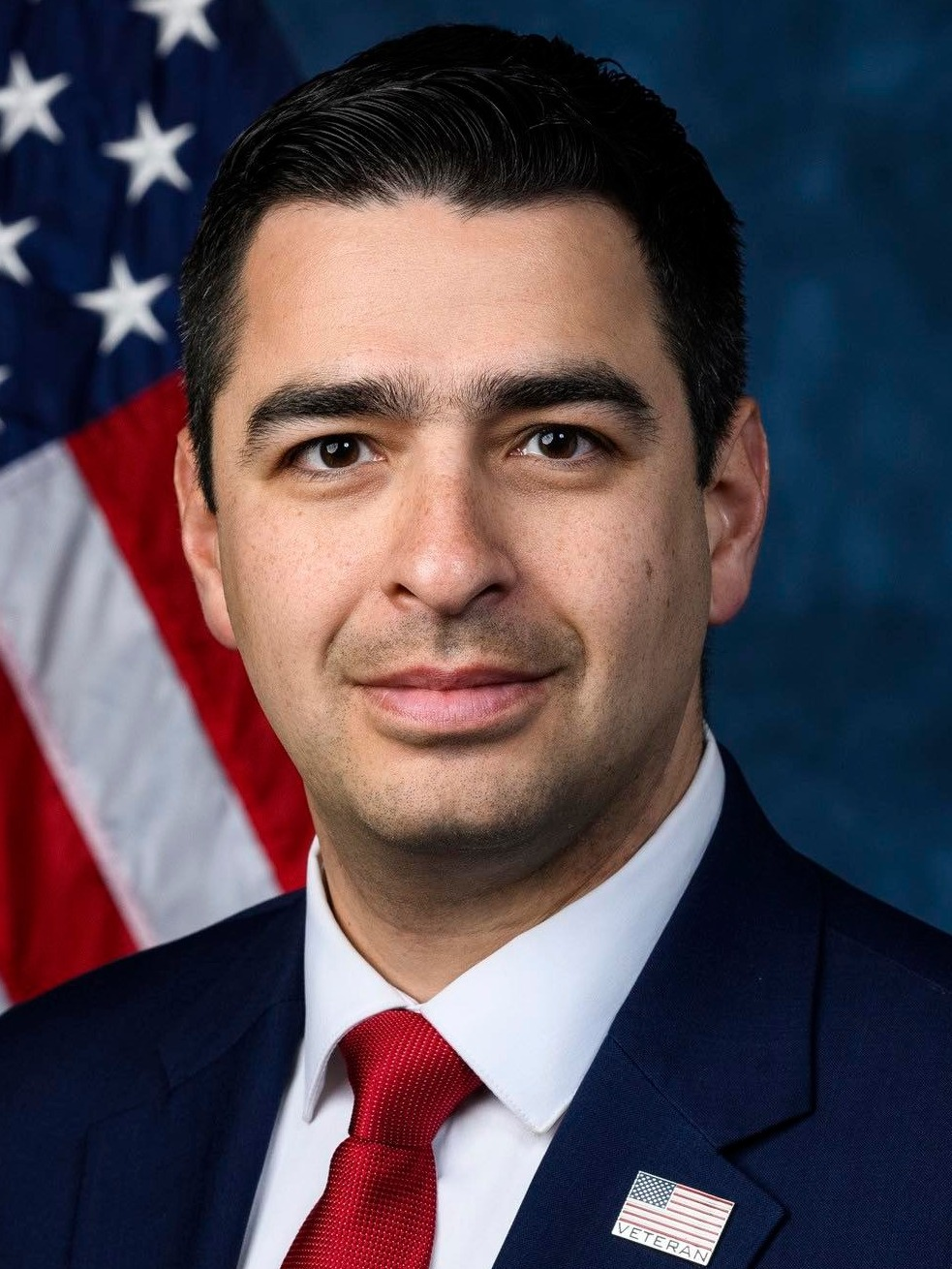

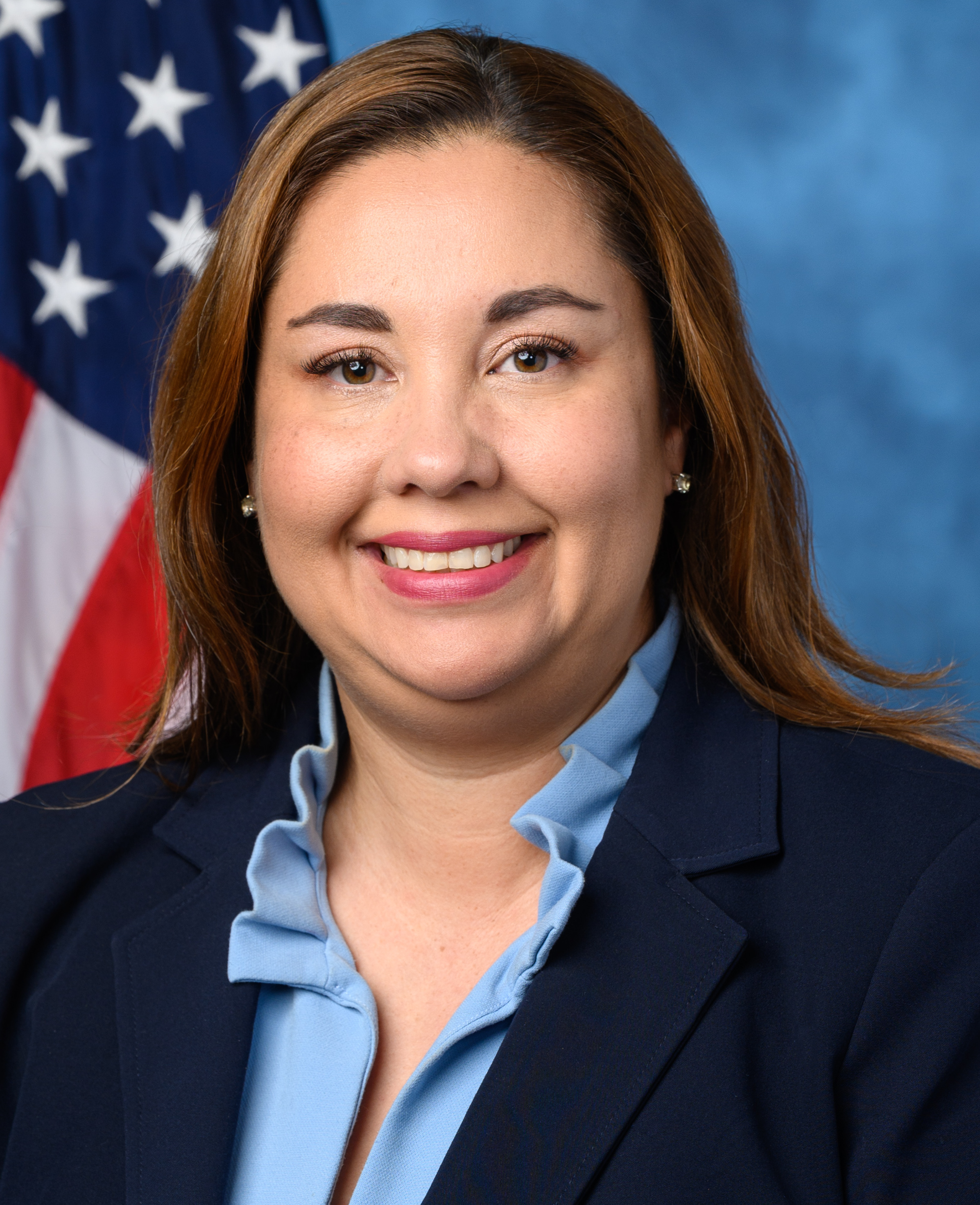
Nominee	Gabe Evans	Yadira Caraveo
Party	Republican	Democratic
Popular vote	163,320	160,871
Percentage	48.95%	48.22%
- Evans: 40–50% 50–60% 60–70% 70–80% 80–90% Caraveo: 40–50% 50–60% 60–70% 70–80% Tie: 40–50% No votes
U.S. Representative before election
Yadira Caraveo
Democratic
Elected U.S. Representative
Gabe Evans
Republican

The 8th district includes the northern Front Range cities and surrounding Denver communities, including Thornton, Brighton, Johnstown, and Greeley. The incumbent was Democrat Yadira Caraveo, who was elected with 48.4% of the vote in 2022. Caraveo was unseated in her reelection bid by Republican Gabe Evans in a minor upset.

=== Democratic primary ===
==== Nominee ====
- Yadira Caraveo, incumbent U.S. representative

==== Endorsements ====
Yadira Caraveo

Organizations

- 314 Action
- AIPAC
- Democratic Majority for Israel
- EMILY's List
- End Citizens United
- Everytown for Gun Safety Action Fund
- Giffords
- Humane Society Legislative Fund
- J Street PAC
- Jewish Democratic Council of America
- Joint Action Committee for Political Affairs
- League of Conservation Voters
- NARAL Pro-Choice America
- National Women's Political Caucus
- Natural Resources Defense Council
- Planned Parenthood Action Fund

Labor unions

- National Education Association

==== Fundraising ====
Campaign finance reports as of June 5, 2024
Candidate	Raised	Spent	Cash on hand
Yadira Caraveo (D)	$3,303,754	$990,330	$2,330,965
Source: Federal Election Commission

==== Results ====
Democratic primary results
Party	Candidate	Votes	%
Democratic	Yadira Caraveo (incumbent)	35,409	100.00%
Total votes		35,409	100.00%

=== Republican primary ===
==== Nominee ====
- Gabe Evans, state representative from the 48th district (2023–present)

==== Eliminated in primary ====
- Janak Joshi, former state representative from the 16th district (2011–2017)

==== Eliminated at convention ====
- Joe Andujo, health insurance consultant

==== Withdrawn ====
- Scott James, Weld County commissioner

==== Declined ====
- Barbara Kirkmeyer, state senator for the 23rd district and nominee for this district in 2022 (ran for re-election)
- Jan Kulmann, mayor of Thornton and candidate for this district in 2022
- Lori Saine, Weld County commissioner, former state representative for the 63rd district, and candidate for this district in 2022 (ran for re-election for county commissioner, lost in primary)
- Dan Woog, former state representative for the 63rd district (ran for state house)

==== Endorsements ====
Gabe Evans

Executive branch officials

- Donald Trump, former president of the United States (2017–2021)

U.S. senators

- Tom Cotton, U.S. senator from Arkansas

U.S. representatives

- Jack Bergman, U.S. representative from MI-1
- Mike Johnson, U.S. representative from LA-4 (2017–present) and speaker of the House (2023–present)
- August Pfluger, U.S. representative from TX-11

Organizations

- Americans for Prosperity
- Republican Jewish Coalition

Labor unions

- Colorado Fraternal Order of Police
Janak Joshi

Political parties

- Colorado Republican Party

Organizations

- Hindu American PAC
Scott James (withdrawn)

U.S. senators

- Hank Brown, former U.S. senator from Colorado (1991–1997)

Local officials

- 20 county commissioners

==== Fundraising ====
Campaign finance reports as of June 5, 2024
Candidate	Raised	Spent	Cash on hand
Gabe Evans (R)	$646,048 (Note: $20,000 of this total was self-funded by Evans.)	$420,979	$225,068
Janak Joshi (R)	$189,067 (Note: $150,000 of this total was self-funded by Joshi.)	$106,323	$82,743
Source: Federal Election Commission

==== Results ====
Republican primary results
Party	Candidate	Votes	%
Republican	Gabe Evans	35,393	77.47%
Republican	Janak Joshi	10,294	22.53%
Total votes		45,687	100.00%

=== General election ===
==== Predictions ====
Source	Ranking	As of
The Cook Political Report	Tossup	July 28, 2023
Sabato's Crystal Ball	Lean D	November 4, 2024
Inside Elections	Tossup	September 15, 2023
Elections Daily	Lean D	June 8, 2023
CNalysis	Tilt D	November 16, 2023

==== Polling ====
Poll source	Date(s) administered	Sample size	Margin of error	Yadira Caraveo (D)	Gabe Evans (R)	Undecided
Emerson College (Note: Poll sponsored by KDVR, KWGN, Nexstar, and The Hill)	October 24–26, 2024	485 (LV)	± 4.4%	48%	46%	7%
Emerson College (Note: Poll sponsored by KDVR, KWGN, and The Hill)	September 29 – October 1, 2024	525 (LV)	± 4.2%	44%	44%	12%
Colorado Community Research (D)	September 20–25, 2024	600 (LV)	± 4.6%	48%	45%	7%
Tarrance Group (R) (Note: Poll sponsored by the Congressional Leadership Fund, which supports Republican congressional candidates)	April 13–16, 2024	400 (LV)	± 4.9%	41%	42%	17%
OnMessage Inc. (R) (Note: Poll sponsored by Evans's campaign)	April 1–4, 2024	400 (LV)	± 4.9%	38%	43%	19%

==== Debate ====
2024 Colorado's 8th congressional district debate
No.	Date	Host	Moderator	Link	Democratic	Republican
Key: P Participant A Absent N Not invited I Invited W Withdrawn						
Key: P Participant A Absent N Not invited I Invited W Withdrawn					Yadira Caraveo	Gabe Evans
1	Oct. 8, 2024	KUSA (TV)	Kyle Clark; Marshall Zelinger	C-SPAN	P	P

==== Results ====
2024 Colorado's 8th congressional district election
Party	Candidate	Votes	%
Republican	Gabe Evans	163,320	48.95%
Democratic	Yadira Caraveo (incumbent)	160,871	48.22%
Approval Voting	Chris Baum	5,741	1.72%
Unity	Susan Hall	3,677	1.10%
Write-in		7	0.00%
Total votes		333,616	100.00%
Republican gain from Democratic			

===== Results by county =====
County	Gabe Evans Republican		Yadira Caraveo Democratic		Various candidates Other parties		Margin		Total votes cast
County	#	%	#	%	#	%	#	%	Total votes cast
Adams (part)	86,842	43.22%	108,131	53.82%	5,936	2.95%	-21,289	-10.60%	200,909
Larimer (part)	7,267	54.28%	5,787	43.22%	335	2.50%	1,480	11.06%	13,389
Weld (part)	69,211	58.01%	46,953	39.35%	3,154	2.64%	22,258	18.66%	119,318
Total	163,320	48.95%	160,871	48.22%	9,425	2.82%	2,449	0.73%	333,616

== Notes ==
Partisan clients
