= Yadira Caraveo =

American politician and pediatrician (born 1980)

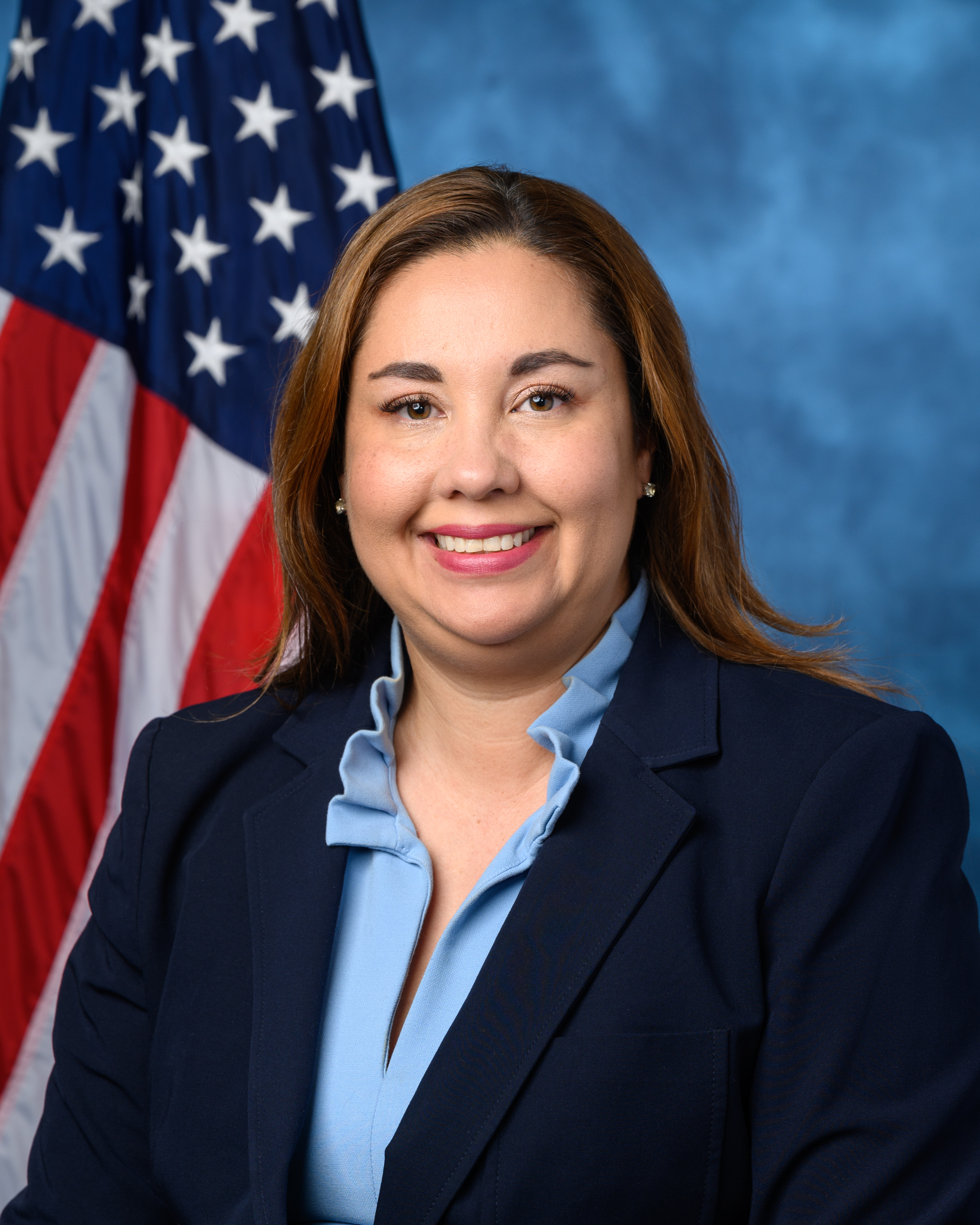
- Official portrait, 2023

Member of the U.S. House of Representatives from Colorado's 8th district
- In office January 3, 2023 – January 3, 2025
- Preceded by: Constituency established
- Succeeded by: Gabe Evans

Member of the Colorado House of Representatives from the 31st district
- In office January 4, 2019 – January 3, 2023
- Preceded by: Joe Salazar
- Succeeded by: Said Sharbini

Personal details
- Born: December 23, 1980 (age 45) Denver, Colorado, U.S.
- Party: Democratic
- Education: Regis University (BS); University of Colorado, Denver (MD)
- Website: House website

Yadira D. Caraveo (/jəˈdɪərə ˌkɛərəˈveɪoʊ/ yə-DEER-ə KAIR-ə-VAY-oh; born December 23, 1980) is an American politician and pediatrician who served as the U.S. representative for Colorado's 8th congressional district from 2023 to 2025. A Democrat, she was Colorado's first Latina member of Congress.

She represented the 31st district in the Colorado House of Representatives from 2019 to 2023. The district covered parts of Adams and Weld counties. She was elected to the United States Congress in 2022. Caraveo narrowly lost re-election in 2024 to Republican Gabe Evans. In April 2025, she announced her candidacy to return to Congress in the 2026 election. She withdrew from the race in September 2025, citing her struggle with mental health and the stigmatization of mental health issues.

== Early life and education ==
Caraveo was born in Denver to Mexican undocumented parents who arrived in the 1970s but were granted amnesty under the Immigration Reform and Control Act of 1986. She volunteered for Barack Obama's 2008 presidential campaign while in medical school. She received her bachelor's degree from Regis University and later her Doctor of Medicine degree from the University of Colorado School of Medicine. Caraveo completed a residency in pediatrics at the University of New Mexico Health Sciences Center, where she was also involved with the Committee of Interns and Residents union for resident physicians.

== Colorado House of Representatives ==
During her tenure as a state legislator, Caraveo was also a pediatrician practicing in Thornton, Colorado. She has also served on the board of trustees for the Anythink Library system in Adams County since 2017.

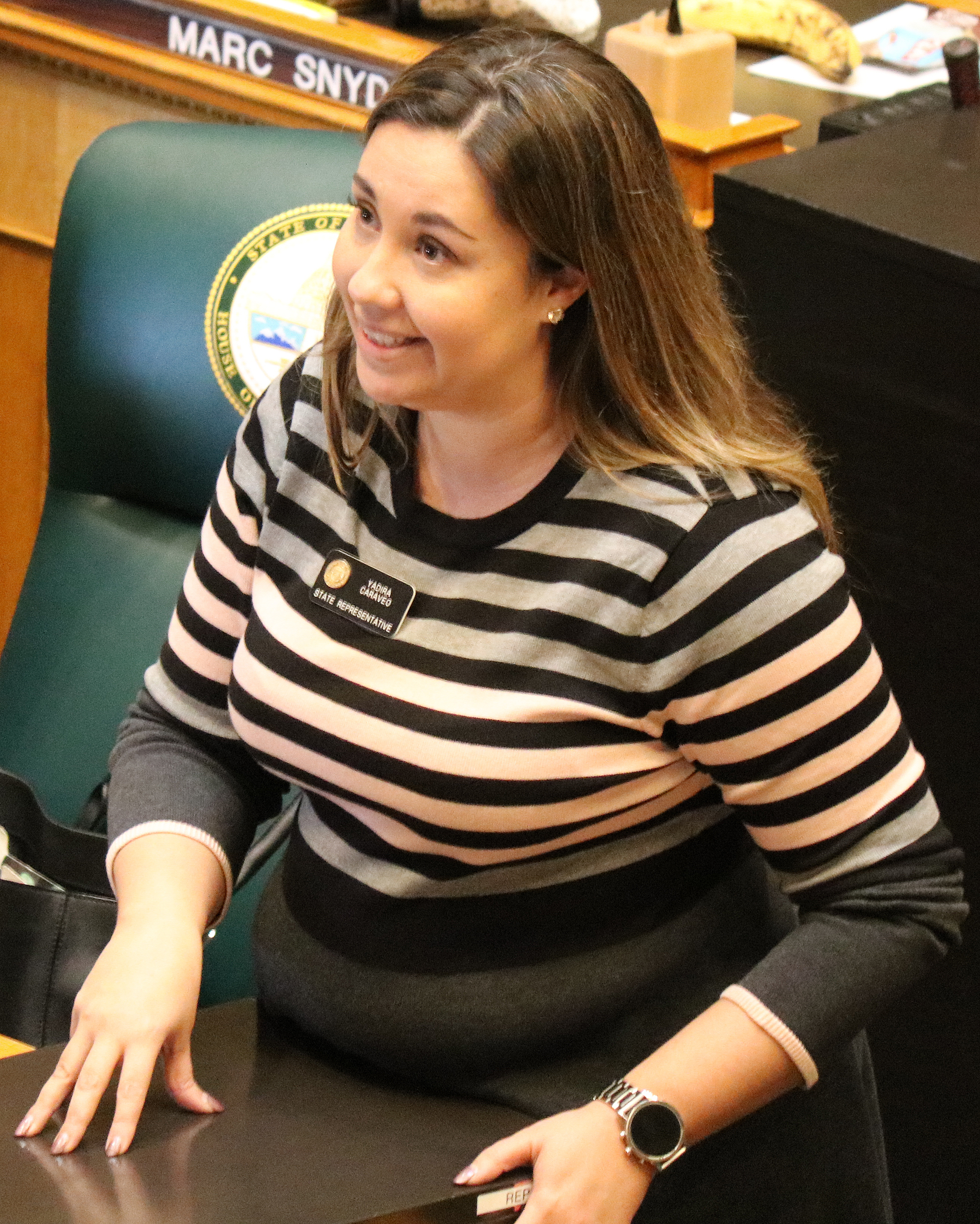
Caraveo in the Colorado House of Representatives

=== Election ===
Caraveo was elected in the general election on November 6, 2018, winning 55% of the vote to Republican nominee Rico Figueroa's 39%.

=== Tenure ===
Caraveo sponsored a bill giving free contraceptives and reproductive care to illegal immigrants, citing studies showing that the program lowers maternal mortality and infant mortality rates. She sponsored a bill that would put an age requirement on some cannabis products, require coroners to conduct a tetrahydrocannabinol (THC) test for all "unnatural deaths", and put a cap on potency levels in products. Caraveo argued the bill would stop younger people from getting addicted to cannabis, while opponents argued testing would be racially motivated. The bill was co-sponsored by Republican members of the legislature and disavowed by Democratic House speaker Alec Garnett. She was the lead sponsor of a sex education law that prohibited abstinence-only curriculum and required schools to teach students about consent.

==== Committees ====
During the 73rd general assembly, Caraveo served on the following committees:

- Health & Insurance (Vice Chair)
- Education

== U.S. House of Representatives ==
=== Elections ===
==== 2022 ====
On August 24, 2021, Caraveo announced her candidacy for Colorado's 8th congressional district. She was endorsed by former Colorado speaker of the House KC Becker, state senator Faith Winter, state senator Jessie Danielson, and others. On April 5, 2022, Caraveo secured the Democratic nomination. On November 9, 2022, Caraveo defeated Republican nominee Barbara Kirkmeyer in the general election, becoming Colorado's first Latina member of Congress.

==== 2024 ====
Caraveo ran for re-election in 2024 against Republican Gabe Evans. She was defeated by Evans in the general election.

==== 2026 ====
On April 15, 2025, Caraveo announced that she would run to retake her seat in Congress in the 2026 election. On September 12, 2025, Caraveo withdrew from the race, saying that she faced "very strong resistance" to her campaign due to her struggles with mental health.

=== Committee assignments ===
For the 118th Congress:

- Committee on Agriculture
  - Subcommittee on Commodity Markets, Digital Assets, and Rural Development (Ranking Member)
  - Subcommittee on Livestock, Dairy, and Poultry
  - Subcommittee on Nutrition, Foreign Agriculture, and Horticulture
- Committee on Science, Space, and Technology
  - Subcommittee on Space and Aeronautics

=== Caucus memberships ===
- Rare Disease Caucus

== Personal life ==
Caraveo is Roman Catholic.

In August 2024, Caraveo announced that she had begun treatment for depression at Walter Reed National Military Medical Center. This followed two incidents where Caraveo had attempted suicide by overdosing on medication at her home in Thornton and district office in Northglenn. These incidents were witnessed by staff members. Caraveo's suicide attempts led aides to propose a safety plan that would remove sharp objects from Caraveo's office and assure staffers that they would not be responsible for talking Caraveo "through suicidal thoughts" or "keeping her company during a crisis", according to The Colorado Sun. Caraveo rejected the safety plan, giving staffers an ultimatum to contend with her mental health challenges or resign within a day. Staffers said they felt mistreated and taken advantage of. In a statement to the Colorado Sun, Caraveo wrote that she was "in a dark place when I was suffering from depression and I know the disease led me to treat my friends, family, and my staff in ways that I regret".

== Electoral history ==
Electoral history of Yadira Caraveo
Year	Office	Party	Primary			General			Result	Swing	Ref.
Year	Office	Party	Total	%	P.	Total	%	P.	Result	Swing	Ref.
2018	State House	Democratic	6,049	100.0	1st	16,242	55.02	1st	Won	Hold	
2020	State House	Democratic	9,677	100.0	1st	27,687	100.0	1st	Won	Hold	
2022	U.S. House	Democratic	38,837	100.0	1st	114,377	48.36	1st	Won	Win	
2024	U.S. House	Democratic	35,409	100.0	1st	160,871	48.22	2nd	Lost	Win	
Source: Secretary of State of Colorado | Election Results

== See also ==
- List of Hispanic and Latino Americans in the United States Congress

U.S. House of Representatives
New constituency	Member of the U.S. House of Representatives from Colorado's 8th congressional district 2023–2025	Succeeded by Gabe Evans
U.S. order of precedence (ceremonial)
Preceded by Betsy Markey as Former U.S. Representative	Order of precedence of the United States as Former U.S. Representative	Succeeded by Rick Berg as Former U.S. Representative
