= Aristocrat Ranchettes, Colorado =

Census-designated place in Weld County, Colorado, United States

- census-designated place
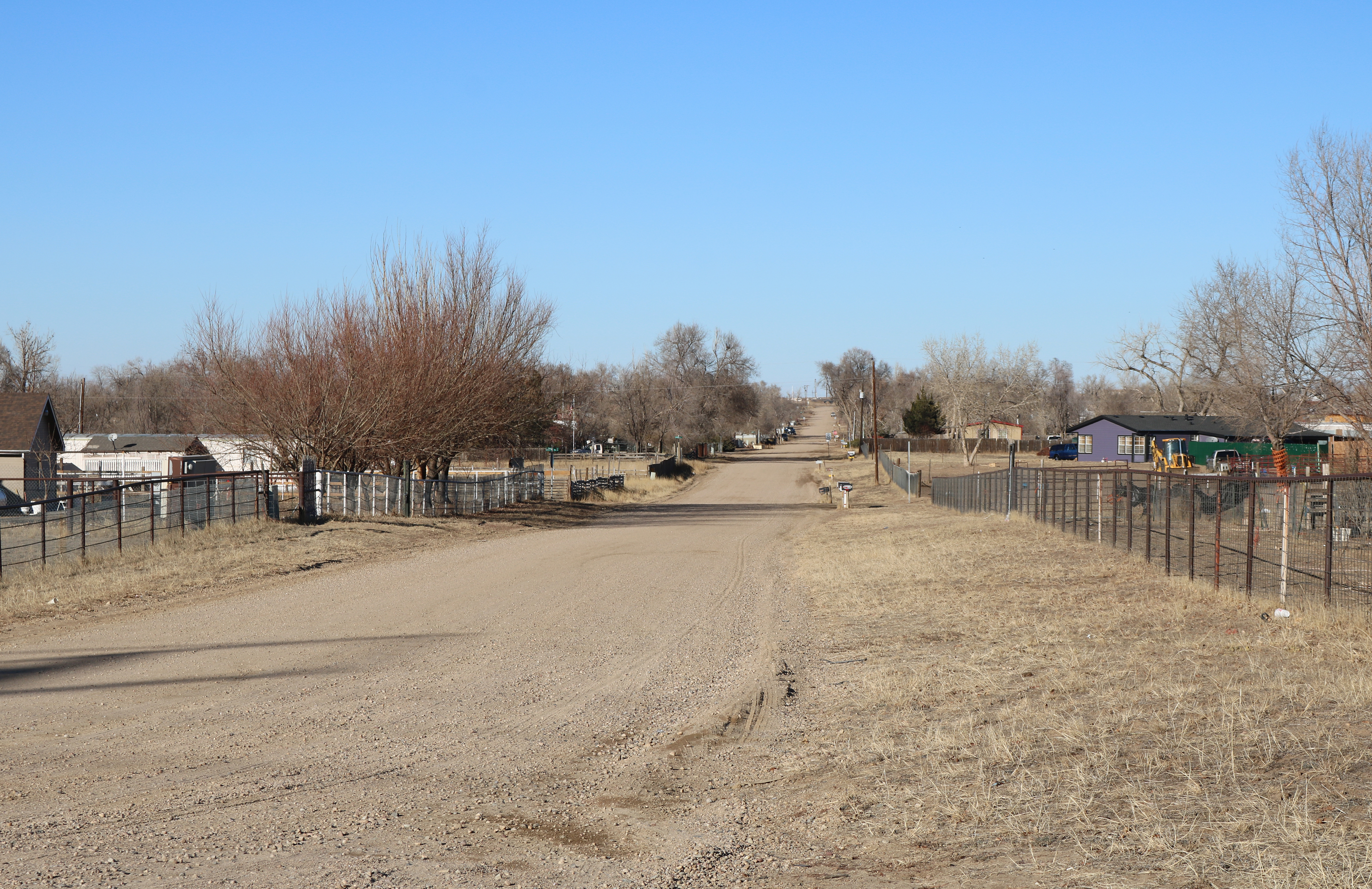
- One of the roads in Aristocrat Ranchettes.

- Location of the Aristocrat Ranchettes CDP in Weld County, Colorado

- Location of Aristocrat Ranchettes, Colorado. Aristocrat Ranchettes (Colorado)
- Coordinates: 40°06′35″N 104°44′52″W
- Country: United States
- State: Colorado
- County: Weld

Government
  - Type: unincorporated community
  - Body: Weld County

Area
  - Total: 1.867 sq mi (4.835 km^{2})
  - Land: 1.867 sq mi (4.835 km^{2})
  - Water: 0 sq mi (0.000 km^{2})
- Elevation: 5,046 ft (1,538 m)

Population (2020)
  - Total: 1,715
  - Density: 918.7/sq mi (354.7/km^{2})
- Time zone: UTC−07:00 (MST)
  - Summer (DST): UTC−06:00 (MDT)
- ZIP Code: Fort Lupton 80621
- Area codes: 303/720/983
- GNIS CDP ID: 2407757
- FIPS code: 08-03015

Aristocrat Ranchettes is an unincorporated community and a census-designated place (CDP) located in Weld County, Colorado, United States. The population of the Aristocrat Ranchettes CDP was 1,715 at the United States Census 2020. The Fort Lupton post office (Zip Code 80621) serves the area. The CDP is a part of the Greeley, CO Metropolitan Statistical Area.

== Geography ==
The Aristocrat Ranchettes CDP has an area of 1,195 acres (4.835 km^{2}), all land.

== Demographics ==
The United States Census Bureau initially defined the Aristocrat Ranchettes CDP for the United States Census 2000.

Aristocrat Ranchettes CDP, Colorado
Year	Pop.	±%
2000	1,254	—
2010	1,344	+7.2%
2020	1,715	+27.6%
Source: United States Census Bureau

=== 2020 census ===
As of the 2020 census, Aristocrat Ranchettes had a population of 1,715. The median age was 34.7 years. 28.0% of residents were under the age of 18 and 10.9% of residents were 65 years of age or older. For every 100 females there were 106.9 males, and for every 100 females age 18 and over there were 108.8 males age 18 and over.

0.0% of residents lived in urban areas, while 100.0% lived in rural areas.

There were 525 households in Aristocrat Ranchettes, of which 41.3% had children under the age of 18 living in them. Of all households, 58.5% were married-couple households, 20.6% were households with a male householder and no spouse or partner present, and 15.4% were households with a female householder and no spouse or partner present. About 17.6% of all households were made up of individuals and 9.0% had someone living alone who was 65 years of age or older.

There were 546 housing units, of which 3.8% were vacant. The homeowner vacancy rate was 1.6% and the rental vacancy rate was 1.7%.

Racial composition as of the 2020 census
Race	Number	Percent
White	899	52.4%
Black or African American	15	0.9%
American Indian and Alaska Native	49	2.9%
Asian	5	0.3%
Native Hawaiian and Other Pacific Islander	2	0.1%
Some other race	522	30.4%
Two or more races	223	13.0%
Hispanic or Latino (of any race)	1,012	59.0%

== See also ==
- Front Range Urban Corridor
- Greeley, CO Metropolitan Statistical Area
