= Unity Party of America =

- Chairperson: Bill Hammons
- Founder: Bill Hammons and Rich Hammons
- Founded: November 4, 2004; 22 years ago
- Registered voters (January 2025): ▼4,087
- Political position: Center
- Colors: Red White and Blue (de jure); Cyan (de facto)
- Slogan: Not Right, Not Left, Forward!
- Elected offices: 0

Website
- unitypartyamerica.us

The Unity Party of America is a national political party in the United States founded on November 4, 2004 with the slogan "Not Right, Not Left, But Forward!" The party has 44 state affiliates.

== History ==
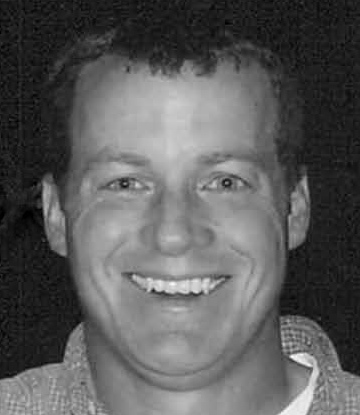
Party founder Bill Hammons in 2008

The "Tripartite Triangle", the party's logo from 2004–2021

The Unity Party grew out of the grassroots group named Runners for Clark which supported General Wesley Clark's 2004 presidential campaign by raising campaign contributions and awareness of Clark's run for the presidency; Runners for Clark morphed into Unity Runners and then into the Unity Party.

Bill Hammons of Texas, New York and Colorado founded the Unity Party in 2004 as chairman and ran as the Unity Party of America candidate for Colorado's 2nd congressional district, centered on Boulder, in 2008 and again in 2010. By that point, the Unity Party had expanded beyond Colorado to 27 states. He then ran for the U.S. Senate in Colorado in 2014 before running for the Senate again in 2016 and then for Colorado governor in 2018 (the "Unity" voter affiliation option in Colorado is a direct result of his Senate candidacy).

In 2012, veteran and Gold Star father Jim Pirtle of Colorado Springs was declared as a Unity Party candidate for Congress.

In 2016, Bill Hammons stood as the party's candidate during the 2016 United States Senate election in Colorado, earning 9,336 votes, or 0.34% of the electorate.

In June 2017, the Unity Party achieved full recognition as a minor party by the state of Colorado, and its candidates in the state no longer need to petition onto the ballot, but instead just need a "show of hands" at a party assembly. By 2017, the party had spread to 37 states.

In September 2017, Unity Party members decided to begin referring to themselves as "Uniters."

In October 2018, Hammons was quoted as saying, "God did not ordain two parties in the United States," and went on to say one goal of his gubernatorial run was to help put a Unity Party presidential candidate at the top of the ballot in Colorado in 2020.

In June 2019, Rebecca Keltie of Colorado Springs became the first female Unity Party candidate for the U.S. House of Representatives, and in September 2019 the Unity Party U.S. Senate candidacy of Arvada's Joshua Rodriguez created the first-ever contested Unity Party nomination race.

Bill Hammons and Eric Bodenstab were nominated for President and Vice President, respectively, in an online convention held over WebEx on April 4, 2020. Hammons and Bodenstab made it onto the ballot in Colorado, Louisiana and New Jersey.

On 18 September 2020, Ian Silverii, columnist for the Denver Post, gave the Unity Party as an alternative to the Colorado Republican Party after the Republicans failed to give any official platform for their 2020 state convention, instead republishing their 2016 platform.

During the 2022 House of Representatives election in District 2, the Unity Party stood Tim Wolf as their candidate, in a crowded field which saw three third parties, including the ideologically similar Colorado Center Party, contest the election.

On 24 August 2023, Richard Ward, the Libertarian candidate for Colorado's 8th congressional district in 2022 who won 3.9% of the vote, announced that he would be switching party affiliation to the Unity Party, citing the rightward shift in the Libertarian Party after their takeover by the Mises Caucus.

=== Cole-Hammons split ===
On 23 June 2023, Tijani “TJ” Cole, a judge, lawyer, football coach, and failed Democratic candidate for the University of Colorado regent at-large seat in 2023, was elected chairman of the Colorado affiliate of the Unity Party, the formal core of the party, and the only branch of the party with ballot access. Cole and Hammons, the party's federal president, quickly entered a dispute over who should be the Unity Party's 2024 nominee, with Hammons supporting Paul Noel Fiorino while Cole sought a big name such as Robert F. Kennedy Jr. before giving Cornel West the state ballot spot instead of the party's official candidate.

Cole and his wing of the party seized control of the party's website unityparty.us forcing Hammons to make a new website; unitypartyamerica.us with Cole announcing on his website that the Colorado affiliate was the only affiliate of the Unity Party, and to disregard any statements made by Hammons, and vice versa. Hammons' campaign against Cole, dubbed the Double Yellow Line Project, denounces Cole as "Communist and/or Fascist filth" and that he'd be "better off saving [his] energy by [trying to] launch [his] own party." Hammons has sought an appeal with the Federal Election Commission to force Cole to cease and desist using the Unity Party moniker while also trying to get him disbarred since "A judge should not act as an arbitrator or mediator or otherwise perform judicial functions apart from the judge's official duties unless expressly authorized by law."

The two factions of the party would have rival conventions in 2025, with Hammons holding one on April 19 online, while Cole held one on June 21 in Lafayette. Both factions dug in at their conventions and tried to discredit the rival faction.

== Party structure ==
=== Chairman ===
No.	Name	Term start	Term end	Notes
1	Bill Hammons	November 4, 2004	February 11, 2022	Party's founder and longtime perennial candidate.
2	Elijah Herson	April 9, 2022	June 7, 2022	Longtime party Vice-Chairman, resigned due to personality disputes in the party's national committee.
3	Tim Wolf	June 7, 2022	March 29, 2023	Former vice-president, there is no interim-chairman role in the party's constitution, upon Herson's resignation Wolf became chairman until his own resignation.
4	Eric Bodenstab	April 7, 2023	May 12, 2023	Upon the resignation of Wolf, Vice-Chair Jim Wiest declined chairmanship so Secretary Eric Bodenstab became chairman.
5	Alex Darlington	May 12, 2023	July 29, 2023	National committeeman Alex Darlington was elected chairman in an attempt to end the instability of party leadership, however, he too would resign.
6	Sabrina Bryan	July 29, 2023	July 30, 2023	Another interim chairman who oversaw the transfer of power back to Hammons.
1 (7)	Bill Hammons	October 7, 2023	Incumbent	To resolve the leadership instability, then treasurer and founder Bill Hammons was reinstated as chairman.

== Elections ==
=== 2020 election ===
Nominees Hammons and Bodenstab came in 12th place nationally in the 2020 United States presidential election, winning 6,647 votes.

Downballot, the party's Senate candidate, Stephen "Seku" Evans, won 8,971 votes, coming in very last place, underperforming Hammons both in his senatorial run and in his 2018 gubernatorial run.

In the House of Representatives, the party only ran candidates in the state of Colorado, who averaged between 0.5% and 1% of the vote in their respective districts.

The Unity Party's best performance came from James Triebert, who ran for Adams County Commissioner against Democrat Chad Tedesco. He won 29.1% of the vote, with 57,387 votes.

=== 2024 election ===
On December 21, 2023, Donnie Harold Harris, the President of the Unity party of Indiana, and Hammons announced that for the first time in the Unity Party's history that there will be a Unity Presidential primary which will determine the candidate in time for the April 13, 2024, Unity party convention. Additionally, the pair announced that former party chairman Elijah Herson will be moderating a debate.

On April 6, 2024, The Unity Party nominated Paul Noel Fiorino and Matthew May for president and vice president respectively at the 7th United National Convention over Google Meet. However, the Colorado faction of the party, which has the party's ballot access, met on April 13, 2024 and nominated independent Cornel West. It would be at this time when the Colorado party started to butt heads with the national party. By May 2025 the Colorado affiliate announced that it would instead be seeking an affiliation to the Justice for All Party.

Robert F. Kennedy Jr.'s 3rd party presidential campaign had also approached the Unity Party of Colorado for their nomination before they gave it to West.

=== 2026 election ===
In the run-up to the 2026 elections, Karl Schneider, a former vice chair of the El Paso County, Colorado Republican Party, wrote an opinion piece for the Colorado Springs Gazette explaining why he left the Republican Party to join the Unity Party, citing "leadership rooted in integrity, not ideology" and a path "rooted in respect, responsibility and real problem-solving." He went on to say that the Unity Party "is a party for veterans, educators, entrepreneurs, and civic leaders who believe in working together to get things done." He concluded with describing the Unity Party as "a call to action."

In or before June 2026, a new Unity Party of Colorado website unitypartycolorado.us, listing five Unity Party candidates and one Forward Party candidate endorsed by the Unity Party, was launched.

=== 2028 election ===
In April 2023 Harris and Hammons also announced that they would be seeking the party's nomination in the 2028 election with Hammons for President and Harris for VP.

== Platform ==
As of 2014, the Unity Party platform was outlined as supporting a balanced budget amendment, an elimination of the federal income tax, a health care tax deduction, Social Security reform, term limits, and gerrymandering reform.

== Electoral performance ==
=== Presidential campaigns ===
Year	Candidate(s)	Popular votes	Percentage	Electoral votes	Ballot access
2020	President: Bill Hammons; Vice President: Eric Bodenstab	6,647	0.0042%	0	31 / 538
2024	President: Paul Noel Fiorino; Vice President: Matthew May	N/A (Note: Party's candidate was denied the Colorado party's ballot spot and thus received 0 tabulated votes, as the party only has ballot access in Colorado)			0 / 538

=== Senate campaigns ===
Year	Seat	Candidate	Popular votes	Percentage	Place
2014	Colorado Class II	Bill Hammons	6,427	0.32%	6th of 6
2016	Colorado Class III	Bill Hammons	9,336	0.34%	5th of 7
2020	Colorado Class II	Stephen Evans	8,971	0.28%	5th of 5
2022	Colorado Class III	T.J. Cole	16,379	0.66%	4th of 5

=== House campaigns ===
Year	Seat	Candidate	Popular votes	Percentage	Place
2008	Colorado's 2nd	Bill Hammons	2,176	0.63%	4th of 4
2018	Colorado's 6th	Dan Chapin	4,607	1.33%	4th of 4
2020	Colorado's 1st	Paul Noel Fiorino	2,534	0.56%	4th of 4
2020	Colorado's 2nd	Gary Swing	2,524	0.49%	4th of 4
2020	Colorado's 3rd	Critter Milton	4,265	0.99%	4th of 4
2020	Colorado's 4th	Laura Ireland	4,530	0.95%	4th of 4
2020	Colorado's 5th	Rebecca Keltie	3,309	0.77%	5th of 5
2020	Colorado's 6th	Jaimie Kulikowski	3,884	0.89%	4th of 4
2020	Colorado's 7th	Dave Olszta	2,355	0.56%	4th of 4
2022	Colorado's 2nd	Tim Wolf	1,968	0.56%	5th of 5
2022	Colorado's 7th	Critter Milton	1,828	0.50%	4th of 4
2024	Colorado's 1st	Critter Milton	4,084	1.2%	3rd of 4
2024	Colorado's 2nd	Cynthia Munhos de Aquino Sirianni	3,744	0.9%	4th of 5
2024	Colorado's 3rd	Adam Withrow	2,721	0.7%	4th of 4
2024	Colorado's 4th	Paul Noel Fiorino	1,436	0.32%	5th of 5
2024	Colorado's 7th	Ron Tupa	5,271	1.24%	4th of 4
2024	Colorado's 8th	Susan Patricia Hall	3,677	1.1%	4th of 4

=== Gubernatorial campaigns ===
Election	Candidate	Popular votes	Percentage	Place
Colorado 2018	Bill Hammons	25,854	1.02%	4th of 4
Colorado 2022	Paul Noël Fiorino	6,687	0.27%	5th of 5

=== State upper house campaigns ===
Election	Seat	Candidate	Popular votes	Percentage	Place
Colorado 2020	District 33	Jerry Burton	7,482	8.99%	2nd of 2

=== State lower house campaigns ===
Election	Seat	Candidate	Popular votes	Percentage	Place
Colorado 2018	District 43	Scott Wagner	874	2.05%	3rd of 3
Colorado 2020	District 5	Joe Richardson	633	1.35%	3rd of 3
Colorado 2022	District 5	Troy Brekke	539	1.84%	3rd of 3
