= Colorado's congressional delegations =

Map of Colorado's eight congressional districts for the United States House of Representatives since 2022.

Since Colorado became a U.S. state in 1876, it has sent congressional delegations to the United States Senate and United States House of Representatives, beginning with the 44th United States Congress. Prior to statehood, the Colorado Territory sent non-voting delegates to the House of Representatives from 1861 to 1876. Each state elects two senators to serve for six years, and members of the House to two-year terms. Each state elects two senators to serve for six years in general elections, with their re-election staggered. Prior to the ratification of the Seventeenth Amendment in 1913, senators were elected by the Colorado General Assembly. Each state elects a varying number of, but at least one, member of the House, depending on population, to two-year terms. Colorado has sent eight members to the House in each congressional delegation since the 2020 United States Census.

A total of 83 people have served Colorado in the House and 37 have served Colorado in the Senate. The first of seven women to serve Colorado in Congress was Pat Schroeder, who served in the House from 1973 to 1996. The first and only African-American to have served Colorado in Congress is Joe Neguse.

The current dean, or longest-serving member, of the Colorado delegation is Representative Diana DeGette of the 1st district, who has served in the House since 1997. She is the second-longest serving member of Congress in Colorado history, only behind Edward T. Taylor, who served in the House from 1909 to 1941. DeGette lost the 2026 Democratic primary in her district; after her term ends on January 20, 2027, senior senator Michael Bennet will become the Colorado delegation's dean. Henry M. Teller, who served more than 30 years in the Senate, is the longest-serving senator in Colorado history.

== Current delegation ==
Colorado's current congressional delegation to the 119th Congress consists of two senators, both of whom are Democrats, and eight representatives comprising four Democrats and four Republicans.

The state of Colorado gained an eighth congressional seat beginning in 2023. The current dean of the Colorado delegation is Representative Diana DeGette of the 1st district, who has served in the House since 1997.

The Cook Partisan Voting Index (CPVI) is a measure of how strongly partisan a state is. It measures the party leaning (Democratic or Republican) and the number of percentage points more partisan than the national average. For instance, R+4 would mean the state voted four percentage points more Republican than the national average. As of 2025, the CPVI ranked Colorado's 1st, 2nd, 6th, and 7th districts as leaning Democratic, and the 3rd, 4th, and 5th districts as leaning Republican. The 8th district is ranked as even. As a state, Colorado is ranked as leaning Democratic, with a score of D+6.

Current U.S. senators from Colorado
| Colorado CPVI (2025): D+6 | Class II senator | Class III senator |
|---|---|---|
| Colorado CPVI (2025): D+6 | John Hickenlooper (Junior senator) (Denver) | Michael Bennet (Senior senator) (Denver) |
| Party | Democratic | Democratic |
| Incumbent since | January 3, 2021 | January 21, 2009 |

Current U.S. representatives from Colorado
| District | Member (Hometown) | Party | Incumbent since | CPVI (2025) | District map |
|---|---|---|---|---|---|
| 1st | Diana DeGette (Denver) | Democratic | January 3, 1997 | D+29 | Map of Colorado's 1st congressional district |
| 2nd | Joe Neguse (Lafayette) | Democratic | January 3, 2019 | D+20 | Map of Colorado's 2nd congressional district |
| 3rd | Jeff Hurd (Grand Junction) | Republican | January 3, 2025 | R+5 | Map of Colorado's 3rd congressional district |
| 4th | Lauren Boebert (Windsor) | Republican | January 3, 2025 | R+9 | Map of Colorado's 4th congressional district |
| 5th | Jeff Crank (Colorado Springs) | Republican | January 3, 2025 | R+5 | Map of Colorado's 5th congressional district |
| 6th | Jason Crow (Aurora) | Democratic | January 3, 2019 | D+11 | Map of Colorado's 6th congressional district |
| 7th | Brittany Pettersen (Lakewood) | Democratic | January 3, 2023 | D+8 | Map of Colorado's 7th congressional district |
| 8th | Gabe Evans (Fort Lupton) | Republican | January 3, 2025 | EVEN | Map of Colorado's 8th congressional district |

== United States Senate ==
Two senators from Colorado, Henry M. Teller and Ken Salazar, have also served as the United States Secretary of the Interior, under the Arthur administration and Obama administration respectively. Salazar is currently serving as the United States ambassador to Mexico under the Biden administration. Many senators from Colorado, including John F. Shafroth and Edwin C. Johnson, also served as the governor of Colorado. Some have also been at the forefront of national politics during their careers, including Eugene Millikin, who served as the chairman of the Senate Republican Conference, and Gary Hart, who finished second in the 1984 Democratic Party presidential primaries and was considered a frontrunner in the 1988 Democratic Party presidential primaries.

Senators are elected every six years depending on their class, with each senator serving a six-year term, and elections for senators occurring every two years, rotating through each class such that each election, around one-third of the seats in the Senate are up for election. Colorado's senators are elected in classes II and III. Currently, Colorado is represented in the Senate by Michael Bennet and John Hickenlooper.

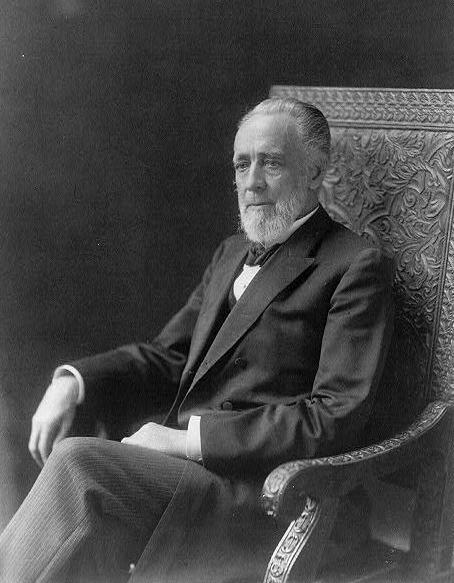
Henry M. Teller, Colorado senator who drafted the Teller Amendment and served as the United States Secretary of the Interior during the Arthur administration.

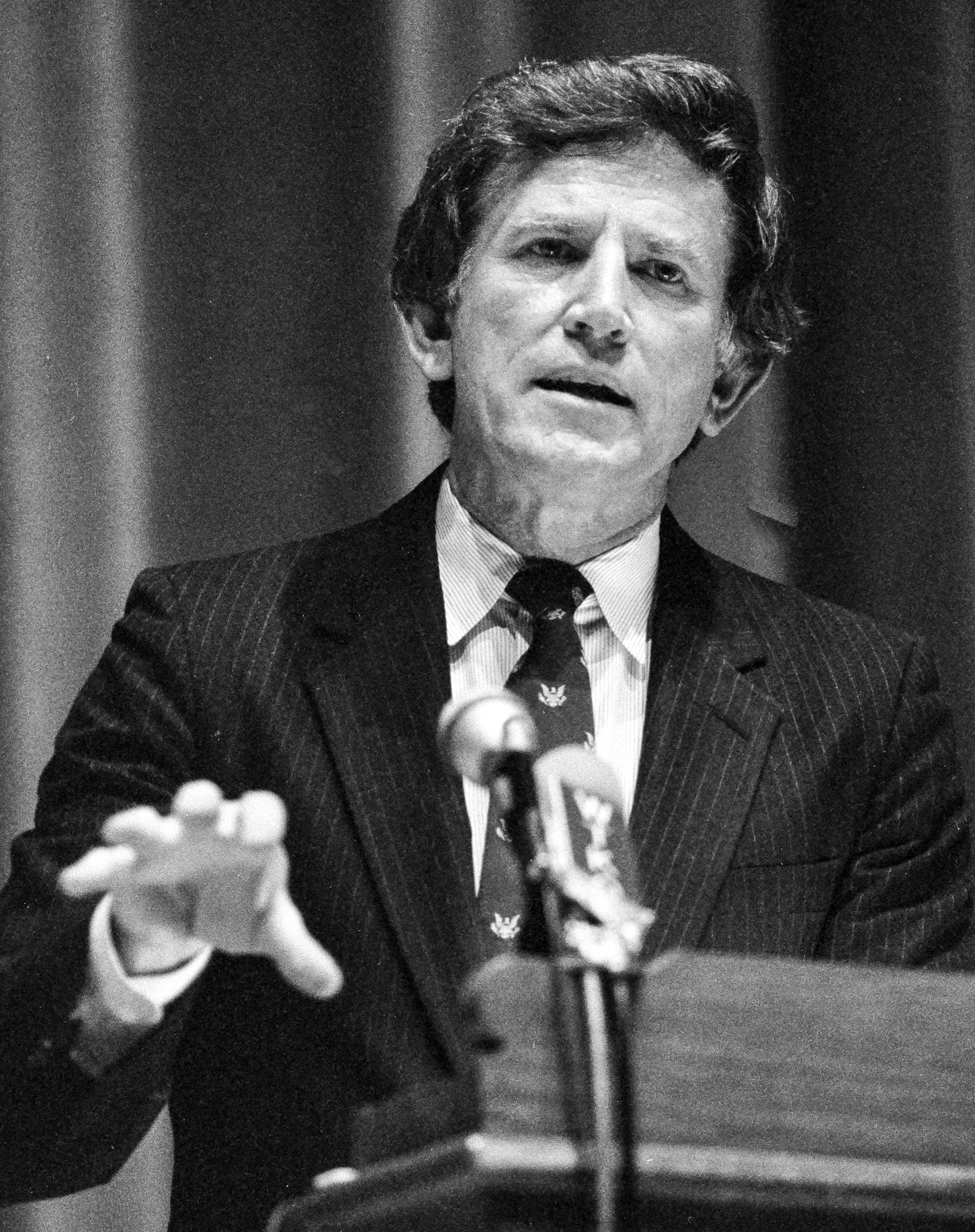
Gary Hart, who finished second in the 1984 Democratic Party presidential primaries and was considered a frontrunner in the 1988 Democratic Party presidential primaries.

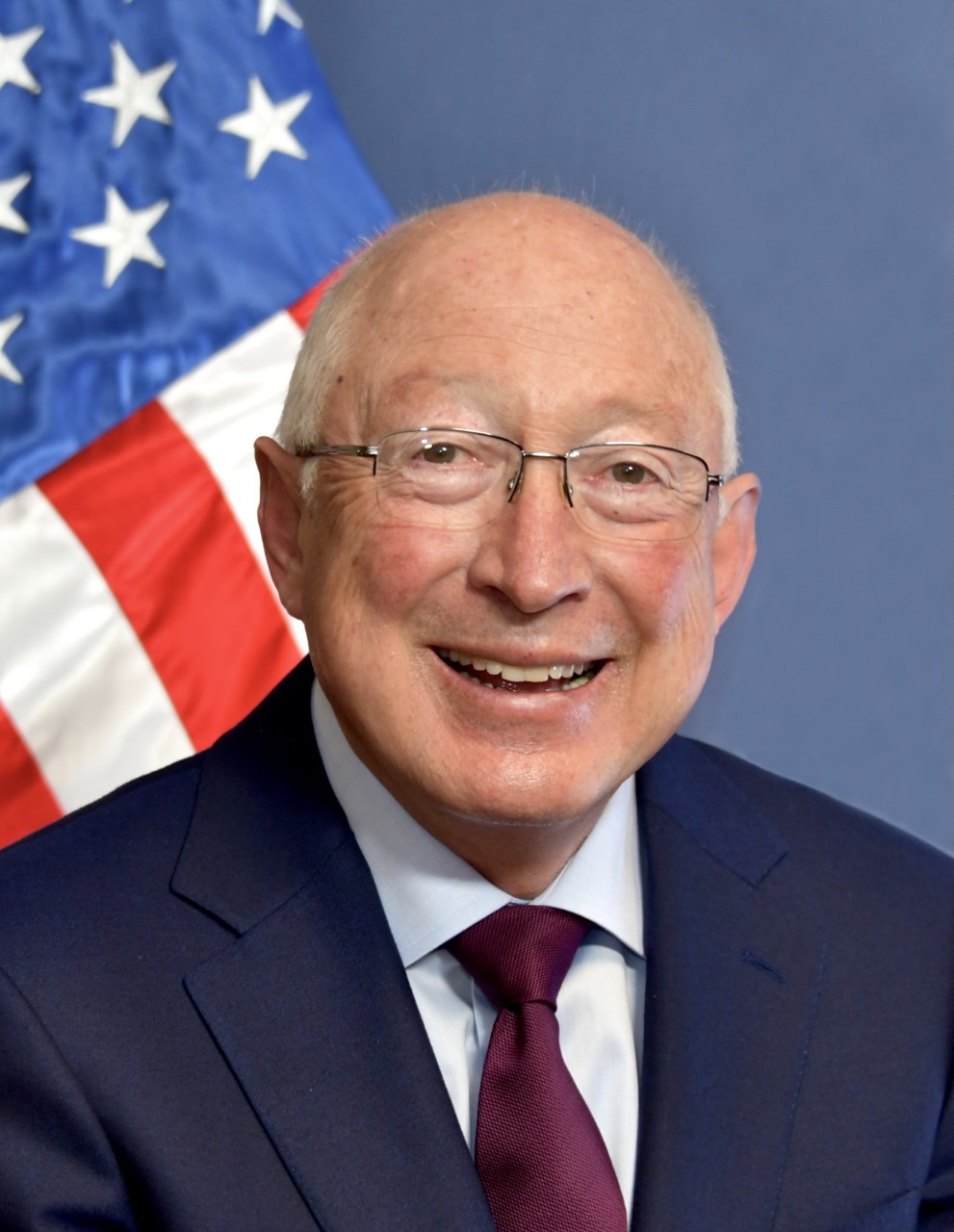
Ken Salazar, Colorado senator who served as the United States Secretary of the Interior during the Obama administration and the United States ambassador to Mexico during the Biden administration.

Democratic (D) Republican (R) Silver Republican (SvR)

Senators from Colorado
| Class II senator | Congress | Class III senator |
|---|---|---|
| Henry M. Teller (R) (Note: Senator Teller resigned in 1882 to become the Secretary of the Interior in the Chester A. Arthur administration. He later returned to the Senate in 1885.) | 44th (1875–1877) | Jerome B. Chaffee (R) |
| Henry M. Teller (R) | 45th (1877–1879) | Jerome B. Chaffee (R) |
| Henry M. Teller (R) | 46th (1879–1881) | Nathaniel P. Hill (R) |
| Henry M. Teller (R) | 47th (1881–1883) | Nathaniel P. Hill (R) |
| George M. Chilcott (R) (Note: Senator Chilcott was appointed to serve in the open seat created by Teller's resignation. He served until Horace Tabor was elected in the 1883 United States Senate special election in Colorado to complete the rest of the term.) | 47th (1881–1883) | Nathaniel P. Hill (R) |
| Horace Tabor (R) | 47th (1881–1883) | Nathaniel P. Hill (R) |
| Thomas M. Bowen (R) | 48th (1883–1885) | Nathaniel P. Hill (R) |
| Thomas M. Bowen (R) | 49th (1885–1887) | Henry M. Teller (R) |
| Thomas M. Bowen (R) | 50th (1887–1889) | Henry M. Teller (R) |
| Edward O. Wolcott (R) | 51st (1889–1891) | Henry M. Teller (R) |
| Edward O. Wolcott (R) | 52nd (1891–1893) | Henry M. Teller (R) |
| Edward O. Wolcott (R) | 53rd (1893–1895) | Henry M. Teller (R) |
| Edward O. Wolcott (R) | 54th (1895–1897) | Henry M. Teller (R) |
| Edward O. Wolcott (R) | 55th (1897–1899) | Henry M. Teller (SvR) (Note: Senator Teller became a member of the Silver Republican Party in protest to the silver policies of the Republican Party.) |
| Edward O. Wolcott (R) | 56th (1899–1901) | Henry M. Teller (SvR) |
| Thomas M. Patterson (D) | 57th (1901–1903) | Henry M. Teller (SvR) |
| Thomas M. Patterson (D) | 58th (1903–1905) | Henry M. Teller (D) (Note: Having already switched to the Silver Republican Party, Senator Teller decided to seek reelection as a member of the Democratic Party, instead of the Republican Party, as silver became less of an issue in politics.) |
| Thomas M. Patterson (D) | 59th (1905–1907) | Henry M. Teller (D) |
| Simon Guggenheim (R) | 60th (1907–1909) | Henry M. Teller (D) |
| Simon Guggenheim (R) | 61st (1909–1911) | Charles J. Hughes Jr. (D) (Note: Senator Hughes died in office.) |
| Simon Guggenheim (R) | 62nd (1911–1913) | Charles S. Thomas (D) |
| John F. Shafroth (D) | 63rd (1913–1915) | Charles S. Thomas (D) |
| John F. Shafroth (D) | 64th (1915–1917) | Charles S. Thomas (D) |
| John F. Shafroth (D) | 65th (1917–1919) | Charles S. Thomas (D) |
| Lawrence C. Phipps (R) | 66th (1919–1921) | Charles S. Thomas (D) |
| Lawrence C. Phipps (R) | 67th (1921–1923) | Samuel D. Nicholson (R) (Note: Senator Nicholson died in office.) |
| Lawrence C. Phipps (R) | 68th (1923–1925) | Samuel D. Nicholson (R) |
| Lawrence C. Phipps (R) | 68th (1923–1925) | Alva B. Adams (D) (Note: Senator Adams was first appointed to the role of Senator on May 17, 1923, to serve in Nicholson's seat until Rice W. Means was elected in a special election. He later returned to the Senate in 1933.) |
| Lawrence C. Phipps (R) | 68th (1923–1925) | Rice W. Means (R) |
| Lawrence C. Phipps (R) | 69th (1925–1927) | Rice W. Means (R) |
| Lawrence C. Phipps (R) | 70th (1927–1929) | Charles W. Waterman (R) (Note: Senator Waterman died in office.) |
| Lawrence C. Phipps (R) | 71st (1929–1931) | Charles W. Waterman (R) |
| Edward P. Costigan (D) | 72nd (1931–1933) | Charles W. Waterman (R) |
| Edward P. Costigan (D) | 72nd (1931–1933) | Walter Walker (D) (Note: Senator Walker was appointed by Governor William Herbert Adams on September 27, 1932, to serve in Waterman's seat until Karl C. Schuyler was elected in a special election.) |
| Edward P. Costigan (D) | 72nd (1931–1933) | Karl C. Schuyler (R) |
| Edward P. Costigan (D) | 73rd (1933–1935) | Alva B. Adams (D) (Note: Senator Adams died in office.) |
| Edward P. Costigan (D) | 74th (1935–1937) | Alva B. Adams (D) |
| Edwin C. Johnson (D) | 75th (1937–1939) | Alva B. Adams (D) |
| Edwin C. Johnson (D) | 76th (1939–1941) | Alva B. Adams (D) |
| Edwin C. Johnson (D) | 77th (1941–1943) | Alva B. Adams (D) |
| Edwin C. Johnson (D) | 77th (1941–1943) | Eugene Millikin (R) |
| Edwin C. Johnson (D) | 78th (1943–1945) | Eugene Millikin (R) |
| Edwin C. Johnson (D) | 79th (1945–1947) | Eugene Millikin (R) |
| Edwin C. Johnson (D) | 80th (1947–1949) | Eugene Millikin (R) |
| Edwin C. Johnson (D) | 81st (1949–1951) | Eugene Millikin (R) |
| Edwin C. Johnson (D) | 82nd (1951–1953) | Eugene Millikin (R) |
| Edwin C. Johnson (D) | 83rd (1953–1955) | Eugene Millikin (R) |
| Gordon Allott (R) | 84th (1955–1957) | Eugene Millikin (R) |
| Gordon Allott (R) | 85th (1957–1959) | John A. Carroll (D) |
| Gordon Allott (R) | 86th (1959–1961) | John A. Carroll (D) |
| Gordon Allott (R) | 87th (1961–1963) | John A. Carroll (D) |
| Gordon Allott (R) | 88th (1963–1965) | Peter H. Dominick (R) |
| Gordon Allott (R) | 89th (1965–1967) | Peter H. Dominick (R) |
| Gordon Allott (R) | 90th (1967–1969) | Peter H. Dominick (R) |
| Gordon Allott (R) | 91st (1969–1971) | Peter H. Dominick (R) |
| Gordon Allott (R) | 92nd (1971–1973) | Peter H. Dominick (R) |
| Floyd Haskell (D) | 93rd (1973–1975) | Peter H. Dominick (R) |
| Floyd Haskell (D) | 94th (1975–1977) | Gary Hart (D) |
| Floyd Haskell (D) | 95th (1977–1979) | Gary Hart (D) |
| William L. Armstrong (R) | 96th (1979–1981) | Gary Hart (D) |
| William L. Armstrong (R) | 97th (1981–1983) | Gary Hart (D) |
| William L. Armstrong (R) | 98th (1983–1985) | Gary Hart (D) |
| William L. Armstrong (R) | 99th (1985–1987) | Gary Hart (D) |
| William L. Armstrong (R) | 100th (1987–1989) | Tim Wirth (D) |
| William L. Armstrong (R) | 101st (1989–1991) | Tim Wirth (D) |
| Hank Brown (R) | 102nd (1991–1993) | Tim Wirth (D) |
| Hank Brown (R) | 103rd (1993–1995) | Ben Nighthorse Campbell (D) |
| Hank Brown (R) | 104th (1995–1997) | Ben Nighthorse Campbell (R) (Note: Senator Campbell switched from the Democratic party to the Republican party in 1995.) |
| Wayne Allard (R) | 105th (1997–1999) | Ben Nighthorse Campbell (R) |
| Wayne Allard (R) | 106th (1999–2001) | Ben Nighthorse Campbell (R) |
| Wayne Allard (R) | 107th (2001–2003) | Ben Nighthorse Campbell (R) |
| Wayne Allard (R) | 108th (2003–2005) | Ben Nighthorse Campbell (R) |
| Wayne Allard (R) | 109th (2005–2007) | Ken Salazar (D) (Note: Senator Salazar resigned in 2009 to become the Secretary of the Interior under the Obama administration.) |
| Wayne Allard (R) | 110th (2007–2009) | Ken Salazar (D) |
| Mark Udall (D) | 111th (2009–2011) | Ken Salazar (D) |
| Mark Udall (D) | 111th (2009–2011) | Michael Bennet (D) |
| Mark Udall (D) | 112th (2011–2013) | Michael Bennet (D) |
| Mark Udall (D) | 113th (2013–2015) | Michael Bennet (D) |
| Cory Gardner (R) | 114th (2015–2017) | Michael Bennet (D) |
| Cory Gardner (R) | 115th (2017–2019) | Michael Bennet (D) |
| Cory Gardner (R) | 116th (2019–2021) | Michael Bennet (D) |
| John Hickenlooper (D) | 117th (2021–2023) | Michael Bennet (D) |
| John Hickenlooper (D) | 118th (2023–2025) | Michael Bennet (D) |
| John Hickenlooper (D) | 119th (2025–2027) | Michael Bennet (D) |
| John Hickenlooper (D) | 120th (2027–2029) | Michael Bennet (D) |

== United States House of Representatives ==
Many representatives from Colorado have played important roles in the House of Representatives, including by chairing congressional committees. For instance, Wayne N. Aspinall chaired the United States House Committee on Natural Resources from 1959 to 1973, and Edward T. Taylor chaired the United States House Committee on Appropriations for more than three terms. Taylor was also influential in the passing of the Taylor Grazing Act of 1934, which is named after him. Others took on important roles later in their careers, such as John F. Shafroth, who later became the governor of Colorado and a senator from Colorado known for his influence over the passing of the Federal Reserve Act of 1913. Seven women have served Colorado in the House, the first being Pat Schroeder, and the first and only African-American to have served Colorado in the House is Joe Neguse.

Each district uses a popular vote to elect a member of Colorado's delegation in the House of Representatives. Districts are redrawn every ten years, after data from the US Census is collected. From 1861 to 1876, Colorado sent a non-voting delegate to the House of Representatives; when it became a state in 1876, it had one seat in the House. Since then, its representation in the House has grown along with its population. Since 2023, Colorado has had eight congressional districts drawn according to the results of the 2020 United States Census.

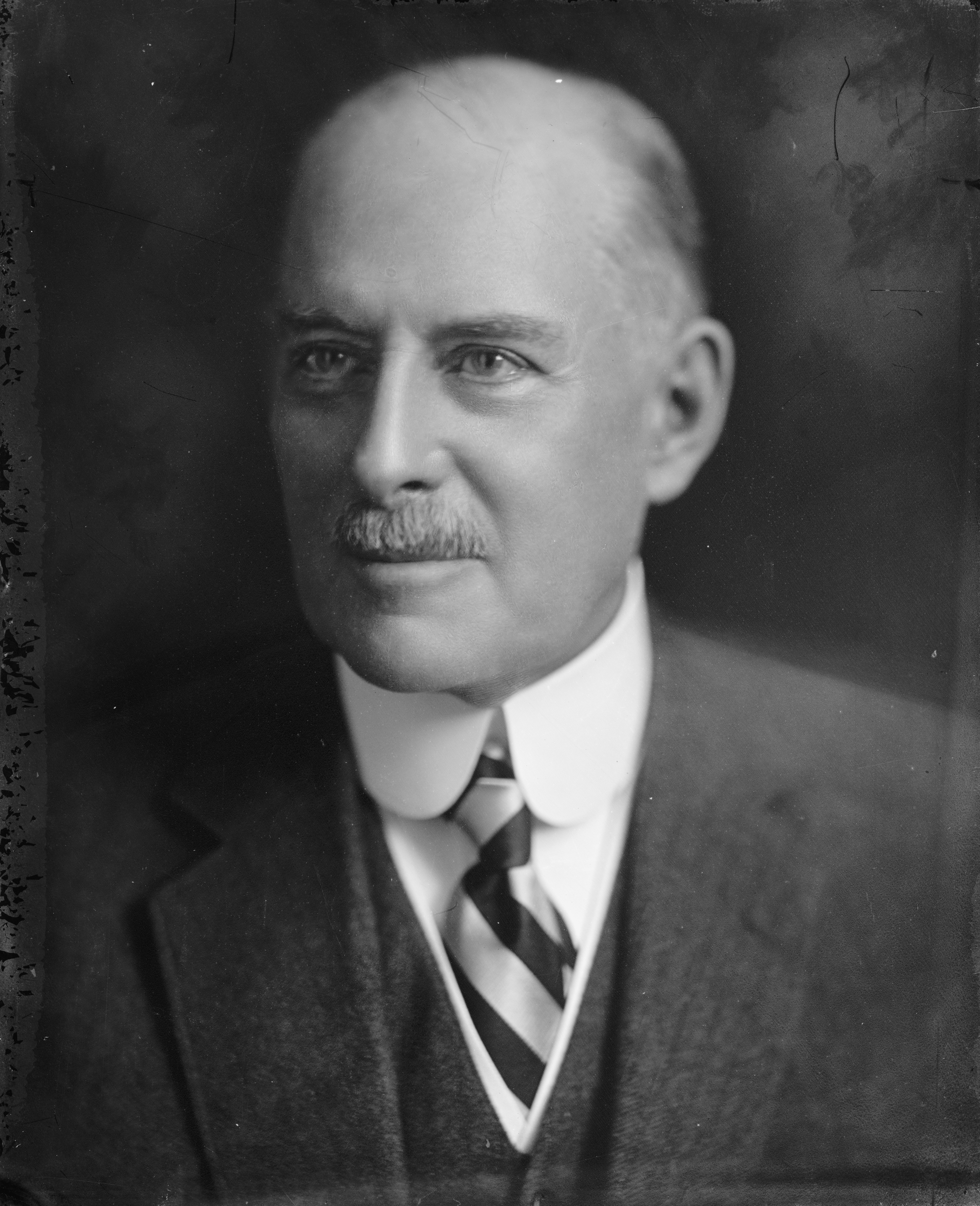
Edward T. Taylor, who chaired the United States House Committee on Appropriations and advocated for the passage of the Taylor Grazing Act of 1934.

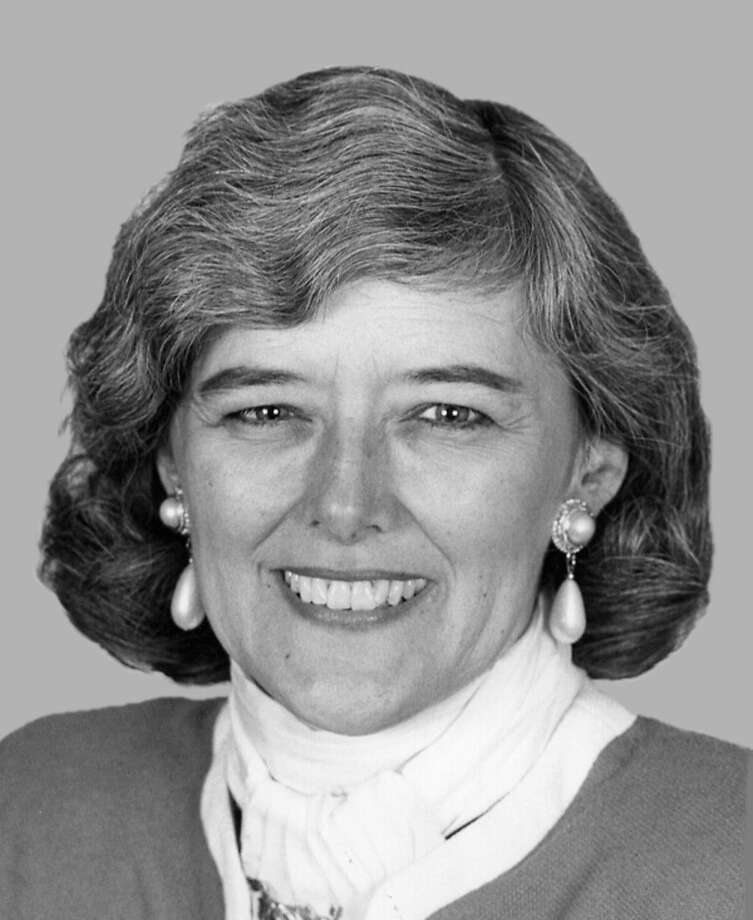
Pat Schroeder, the first woman to serve Colorado in the House, fought for the passage of the Pregnancy Discrimination Act and the Family and Medical Leave Act.

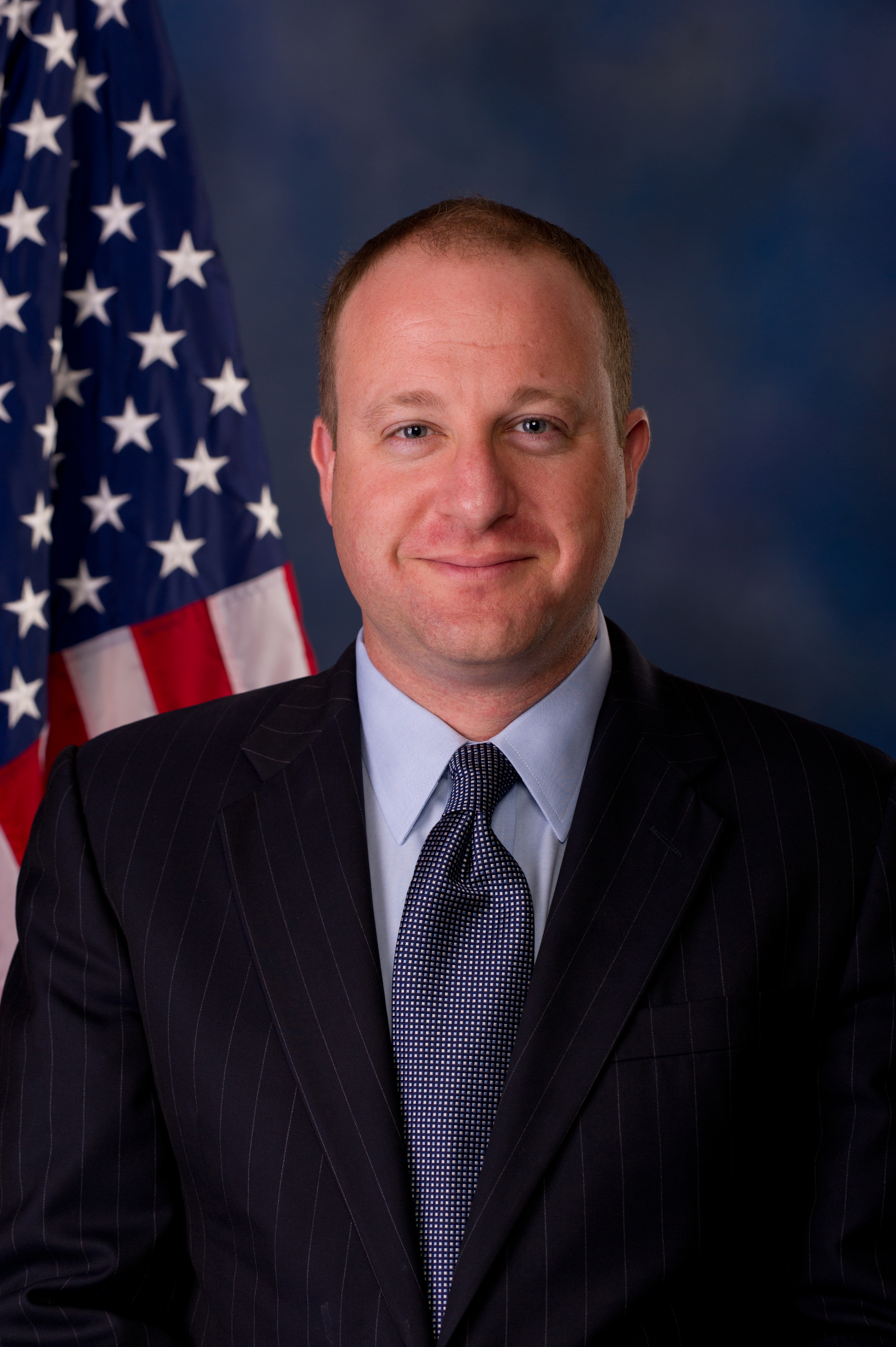
Jared Polis, who served as a representative from Colorado, became the first openly gay man elected both to Congress and, later, as a governor in the United States.

=== 1861–1876: 1 non-voting delegate ===
Starting on August 19, 1861, the Territory of Colorado sent a non-voting delegate to the House.

Democratic (D) Republican (R)

Delegates to the House of Representatives from Colorado from 1861 to 1877
| Congress | Delegate from Territory's at-large district |
|---|---|
| 37th (1861–1863) | Hiram Pitt Bennet (Cons. R) |
| 38th (1863–1865) | Hiram Pitt Bennet (Cons. R) |
| 39th (1865–1867) | Allen Alexander Bradford (R) |
| 40th (1867–1869) | George M. Chilcott (R) |
| 41st (1869–1871) | Allen Alexander Bradford (R) |
| 42nd (1871–1873) | Jerome B. Chaffee (R) |
| 43rd (1873–1875) | Jerome B. Chaffee (R) |
| 44th (1875–1877) | Thomas M. Patterson (D) |

=== 1876–1893: 1 seat ===
Following statehood on August 1, 1876, the state of Colorado was apportioned one seat in the House.

Democratic (D) Republican (R)

Members of the House of Representatives from Colorado from 1876 to 1893
| Congress | At-large district |
|---|---|
| 44th (1875–1877) | James B. Belford (R) |
| 45th (1877–1879) | James B. Belford (R) |
| 45th (1877–1879) | Thomas M. Patterson (D) |
| 46th (1879–1881) | James B. Belford (R) |
| 47th (1881–1883) | James B. Belford (R) |
| 48th (1883–1885) | James B. Belford (R) |
| 49th (1885–1887) | George G. Symes (R) |
| 50th (1887–1889) | George G. Symes (R) |
| 51st (1889–1891) | Hosea Townsend (R) |
| 52nd (1891–1893) | Hosea Townsend (R) |

=== 1893–1903: 2 seats ===
Following the 1890 census, Colorado was apportioned two seats.

Populist (Pop) Silver Party (Sv) Republican (R)

Members of the House of Representatives from Colorado from 1893 to 1903
| Congress | District | |
| Congress | 1st district | 2nd district |
|---|---|---|
| 53rd (1893–1895) | Lafe Pence (Pop) | John Calhoun Bell (Pop) |
| 54th (1895–1897) | John F. Shafroth (R) | John Calhoun Bell (Pop) |
| 55th (1897–1899) | John F. Shafroth (Sv) | John Calhoun Bell (Pop) |
| 56th (1899–1901) | John F. Shafroth (Sv) | John Calhoun Bell (Pop) |
| 57th (1901–1903) | John F. Shafroth (Sv) | John Calhoun Bell (Pop) |

=== 1903–1913: 3 seats ===
Following the 1900 census, Colorado was apportioned three seats.

Democratic (D) Republican (R)

Members of the House of Representatives from Colorado from 1903 to 1913
| Congress | District | | At-large |
| Congress | 1st district | 2nd district | At-large |
|---|---|---|---|
| 58th (1903–1905) | John F. Shafroth (D) (Note: Representative Shafroth resigned, believing that he had won the 1902 United States House of Representatives election in Colorado because of election fraud, giving up his seat for his opponent, Robert W. Bonynge.) | Herschel M. Hogg (R) | Franklin E. Brooks (R) |
| 58th (1903–1905) | Robert W. Bonynge (R) | Herschel M. Hogg (R) | Franklin E. Brooks (R) |
| 59th (1905–1907) | Robert W. Bonynge (R) | Herschel M. Hogg (R) | Franklin E. Brooks (R) |
| 60th (1907–1909) | Robert W. Bonynge (R) | Warren A. Haggott (R) | George W. Cook (R) |
| 61st (1909–1911) | Atterson W. Rucker (D) | John Andrew Martin (D) | Edward T. Taylor (D) |
| 62nd (1911–1913) | Atterson W. Rucker (D) | John Andrew Martin (D) | Edward T. Taylor (D) |

=== 1913–1973: 4 seats ===
Following the 1910 census, Colorado was apportioned four seats.

Democratic (D) Republican (R)

Members of the House of Representatives from Colorado from 1913 to 1973
| Congress | District | | At-large | |
| Congress | 1st | 2nd | Seat A | Seat B |
|---|---|---|---|---|
| 63rd (1913–1915) | George John Kindel (D) | Harry H. Seldomridge (D) | Edward Keating (D) | Edward T. Taylor (D) |
| 64th (1915–1917) | Benjamin Hilliard (D) | Charles B. Timberlake (R) | 3rd district | 4th district |
| 64th (1915–1917) | Benjamin Hilliard (D) | Charles B. Timberlake (R) | Edward Keating (D) | Edward T. Taylor (D) (Note: Representative Taylor died in office.) |
| 65th (1917–1919) | Benjamin Hilliard (D) | Charles B. Timberlake (R) | Edward Keating (D) | Edward T. Taylor (D) |
| 66th (1919–1921) | William N. Vaile (R) (Note: Representative Vaile died in office.) | Charles B. Timberlake (R) | Guy U. Hardy (R) | Edward T. Taylor (D) |
| 67th (1921–1923) | William N. Vaile (R) | Charles B. Timberlake (R) | Guy U. Hardy (R) | Edward T. Taylor (D) |
| 68th (1923–1925) | William N. Vaile (R) | Charles B. Timberlake (R) | Guy U. Hardy (R) | Edward T. Taylor (D) |
| 69th (1925–1927) | William N. Vaile (R) | Charles B. Timberlake (R) | Guy U. Hardy (R) | Edward T. Taylor (D) |
| 70th (1927–1929) | William N. Vaile (R) | Charles B. Timberlake (R) | Guy U. Hardy (R) | Edward T. Taylor (D) |
| 70th (1927–1929) | S. Harrison White (D) | Charles B. Timberlake (R) | Guy U. Hardy (R) | Edward T. Taylor (D) |
| 71st (1929–1931) | William R. Eaton (R) | Charles B. Timberlake (R) | Guy U. Hardy (R) | Edward T. Taylor (D) |
| 72nd (1931–1933) | William R. Eaton (R) | Charles B. Timberlake (R) | Guy U. Hardy (R) | Edward T. Taylor (D) |
| 73rd (1933–1935) | Lawrence Lewis (D) (Note: Representative Lewis died in office.) | Fred N. Cummings (D) | John Andrew Martin (D) (Note: Representative Martin died in office.) | Edward T. Taylor (D) |
| 74th (1935–1937) | Lawrence Lewis (D) | Fred N. Cummings (D) | John Andrew Martin (D) | Edward T. Taylor (D) |
| 75th (1937–1939) | Lawrence Lewis (D) | Fred N. Cummings (D) | John Andrew Martin (D) | Edward T. Taylor (D) |
| 76th (1939–1941) | Lawrence Lewis (D) | Fred N. Cummings (D) | John Andrew Martin (D) | Edward T. Taylor (D) |
| 76th (1939–1941) | Lawrence Lewis (D) | Fred N. Cummings (D) | William E. Burney (D) | Edward T. Taylor (D) |
| 77th (1941–1943) | Lawrence Lewis (D) | William S. Hill (R) | John Chenoweth (R) | Edward T. Taylor (D) |
| 77th (1941–1943) | Lawrence Lewis (D) | William S. Hill (R) | John Chenoweth (R) | Robert F. Rockwell (R) |
| 78th (1943–1945) | Lawrence Lewis (D) | William S. Hill (R) | John Chenoweth (R) | Robert F. Rockwell (R) |
| 78th (1943–1945) | Dean M. Gillespie (R) | William S. Hill (R) | John Chenoweth (R) | Robert F. Rockwell (R) |
| 79th (1945–1947) | Dean M. Gillespie (R) | William S. Hill (R) | John Chenoweth (R) | Robert F. Rockwell (R) |
| 80th (1947–1949) | John A. Carroll (D) | William S. Hill (R) | John Chenoweth (R) | Robert F. Rockwell (R) |
| 81st (1949–1951) | John A. Carroll (D) | William S. Hill (R) | John H. Marsalis (D) | Wayne N. Aspinall (D) |
| 82nd (1951–1953) | Byron G. Rogers (D) | William S. Hill (R) | John Chenoweth (R) | Wayne N. Aspinall (D) |
| 83rd (1953–1955) | Byron G. Rogers (D) | William S. Hill (R) | John Chenoweth (R) | Wayne N. Aspinall (D) |
| 84th (1955–1957) | Byron G. Rogers (D) | William S. Hill (R) | John Chenoweth (R) | Wayne N. Aspinall (D) |
| 85th (1957–1959) | Byron G. Rogers (D) | William S. Hill (R) | John Chenoweth (R) | Wayne N. Aspinall (D) |
| 86th (1959–1961) | Byron G. Rogers (D) | Byron L. Johnson (D) | John Chenoweth (R) | Wayne N. Aspinall (D) |
| 87th (1961–1963) | Byron G. Rogers (D) | Peter H. Dominick (R) | John Chenoweth (R) | Wayne N. Aspinall (D) |
| 88th (1963–1965) | Byron G. Rogers (D) | Donald G. Brotzman (R) | John Chenoweth (R) | Wayne N. Aspinall (D) |
| 89th (1965–1967) | Byron G. Rogers (D) | Roy H. McVicker (D) | Frank Evans (D) | Wayne N. Aspinall (D) |
| 90th (1967–1969) | Byron G. Rogers (D) | Donald G. Brotzman (R) | Frank Evans (D) | Wayne N. Aspinall (D) |
| 91st (1969–1971) | Byron G. Rogers (D) | Donald G. Brotzman (R) | Frank Evans (D) | Wayne N. Aspinall (D) |
| 92nd (1971–1973) | Mike McKevitt (R) | Donald G. Brotzman (R) | Frank Evans (D) | Wayne N. Aspinall (D) |
| Congress | 1st | 2nd | 3rd | 4th |
| Congress | District | | | |

=== 1973–1983: 5 seats ===
Following the 1970 census, Colorado was apportioned five seats.

Democratic (D) Republican (R)

Members of the House of Representatives from Colorado from 1973 to 1983
| Congress | District | | | | |
| Congress | 1st district | 2nd district | 3rd district | 4th district | 5th district |
|---|---|---|---|---|---|
| 93rd (1973–1975) | Pat Schroeder (D) | Donald G. Brotzman (R) | Frank Evans (D) | James Johnson (R) | William L. Armstrong (R) |
| 94th (1975–1977) | Pat Schroeder (D) | Tim Wirth (D) | Frank Evans (D) | James Johnson (R) | William L. Armstrong (R) |
| 95th (1977–1979) | Pat Schroeder (D) | Tim Wirth (D) | Frank Evans (D) | James Johnson (R) | William L. Armstrong (R) |
| 96th (1979–1981) | Pat Schroeder (D) | Tim Wirth (D) | Ray Kogovsek (D) | James Johnson (R) | Ken Kramer (R) |
| 97th (1981–1983) | Pat Schroeder (D) | Tim Wirth (D) | Ray Kogovsek (D) | Hank Brown (R) | Ken Kramer (R) |

=== 1983–2003: 6 seats ===
Following the 1980 census, Colorado was apportioned six seats.

Democratic (D) Republican (R)

Members of the House of Representatives from Colorado from 1983 to 2003
| Congress | District | | | | | |
| Congress | 1st | 2nd | 3rd | 4th | 5th | 6th |
|---|---|---|---|---|---|---|
| 98th (1983–1985) | Pat Schroeder (D) | Tim Wirth (D) | Ray Kogovsek (D) | Hank Brown (R) | Ken Kramer (R) | Daniel Schaefer (R) (Note: Elected to fill the vacancy caused by the death of Jack Swigert on December 27, 1982, of respiratory failure; before taking office.) |
| 99th (1985–1987) | Pat Schroeder (D) | Tim Wirth (D) | Mike Strang (R) | Hank Brown (R) | Ken Kramer (R) | Daniel Schaefer (R) |
| 100th (1987–1989) | Pat Schroeder (D) | David Skaggs (D) | Ben Nighthorse; Campbell (D) | Hank Brown (R) | Joel Hefley (R) | Daniel Schaefer (R) |
| 101st (1989–1991) | Pat Schroeder (D) | David Skaggs (D) | Ben Nighthorse; Campbell (D) | Hank Brown (R) | Joel Hefley (R) | Daniel Schaefer (R) |
| 102nd (1991–1993) | Pat Schroeder (D) | David Skaggs (D) | Ben Nighthorse; Campbell (D) | Wayne Allard (R) | Joel Hefley (R) | Daniel Schaefer (R) |
| 103rd (1993–1995) | Pat Schroeder (D) | David Skaggs (D) | Scott McInnis (R) | Wayne Allard (R) | Joel Hefley (R) | Daniel Schaefer (R) |
| 104th (1995–1997) | Pat Schroeder (D) | David Skaggs (D) | Scott McInnis (R) | Wayne Allard (R) | Joel Hefley (R) | Daniel Schaefer (R) |
| 105th (1997–1999) | Diana DeGette (D) | David Skaggs (D) | Scott McInnis (R) | Bob Schaffer (R) | Joel Hefley (R) | Daniel Schaefer (R) |
| 106th (1999–2001) | Diana DeGette (D) | Mark Udall (D) | Scott McInnis (R) | Bob Schaffer (R) | Joel Hefley (R) | Tom Tancredo (R) |
| 107th (2001–2003) | Diana DeGette (D) | Mark Udall (D) | Scott McInnis (R) | Bob Schaffer (R) | Joel Hefley (R) | Tom Tancredo (R) |

=== 2003–2023: 7 seats ===
Following the 2000 census, Colorado was apportioned seven seats.

Democratic (D) Republican (R)

Members of the House of Representatives from Colorado from 2003 to 2023
| Congress | District | | | | | | |
| Congress | 1st | 2nd | 3rd | 4th | 5th | 6th | 7th |
|---|---|---|---|---|---|---|---|
| 108th (2003–2005) | Diana DeGette (D) | Mark Udall (D) | Scott McInnis (R) | Marilyn; Musgrave (R) | Joel Hefley (R) | Tom Tancredo (R) | Bob Beauprez (R) |
| 109th (2005–2007) | Diana DeGette (D) | Mark Udall (D) | John Salazar (D) | Marilyn; Musgrave (R) | Joel Hefley (R) | Tom Tancredo (R) | Bob Beauprez (R) |
| 110th (2007–2009) | Diana DeGette (D) | Mark Udall (D) | John Salazar (D) | Marilyn; Musgrave (R) | Doug Lamborn (R) | Tom Tancredo (R) | Ed Perlmutter (D) |
| 111th (2009–2011) | Diana DeGette (D) | Jared Polis (D) | John Salazar (D) | Betsy Markey (D) | Doug Lamborn (R) | Mike Coffman (R) | Ed Perlmutter (D) |
| 112th (2011–2013) | Diana DeGette (D) | Jared Polis (D) | Scott Tipton (R) | Cory Gardner (R) | Doug Lamborn (R) | Mike Coffman (R) | Ed Perlmutter (D) |
| 113th (2013–2015) | Diana DeGette (D) | Jared Polis (D) | Scott Tipton (R) | Cory Gardner (R) | Doug Lamborn (R) | Mike Coffman (R) | Ed Perlmutter (D) |
| 114th (2015–2017) | Diana DeGette (D) | Jared Polis (D) | Scott Tipton (R) | Ken Buck (R) | Doug Lamborn (R) | Mike Coffman (R) | Ed Perlmutter (D) |
| 115th (2017–2019) | Diana DeGette (D) | Jared Polis (D) | Scott Tipton (R) | Ken Buck (R) | Doug Lamborn (R) | Mike Coffman (R) | Ed Perlmutter (D) |
| 116th (2019–2021) | Diana DeGette (D) | Joe Neguse (D) | Scott Tipton (R) | Ken Buck (R) | Doug Lamborn (R) | Jason Crow (D) | Ed Perlmutter (D) |
| 117th (2021–2023) | Diana DeGette (D) | Joe Neguse (D) | Lauren Boebert (R) | Ken Buck (R) | Doug Lamborn (R) | Jason Crow (D) | Ed Perlmutter (D) |

=== 2023–present: 8 seats ===
Since the 2020 census, Colorado has been apportioned eight seats.

Democratic (D) Republican (R)

Members of the House of Representatives from Colorado from 2023 to present
| Congress | District | | | | | | | |
| Congress | 1st | 2nd | 3rd | 4th | 5th | 6th | 7th | 8th |
|---|---|---|---|---|---|---|---|---|
| 118th (2023–2025) | Diana DeGette (D) | Joe Neguse (D) | Lauren Boebert (R) (Note: Representative Lauren Boebert decided to move to the 4th District after the resignation of Ken Buck.) | Ken Buck (R) (Note: Representative Ken Buck resigned on March 22, 2024, before the end of his term.) | Doug Lamborn (R) | Jason Crow (D) | Brittany Pettersen (D) | Yadira Caraveo (D) |
| 118th (2023–2025) | Diana DeGette (D) | Joe Neguse (D) | Lauren Boebert (R) | Greg Lopez (R) | Doug Lamborn (R) | Jason Crow (D) | Brittany Pettersen (D) | Yadira Caraveo (D) |
| 119th (2025–2027) | Diana DeGette (D) | Joe Neguse (D) | Jeff Hurd (R) | Lauren Boebert (R) | Jeff Crank (R) | Jason Crow (D) | Brittany Pettersen (D) | Gabe Evans (R) |
| 120th (2027–2029) | Melat Kiros (D) | Joe Neguse (D) | Jeff Hurd (R) | Eileen Laubacher (D) | Jessica Killin (D) | Jason Crow (D) | Brittany Pettersen (D) | Manny Rutinel (D) |

== See also ==
- List of United States congressional districts
- Colorado's congressional districts
- Political party strength in Colorado
