= List of United States representatives from Colorado =

The following is an alphabetical list of United States representatives from the state of Colorado. For chronological tables of members of both houses of the United States Congress from the state (through the present day), see Colorado's congressional delegations. It includes members who have represented both the state and the territory, both past and present.

== Current members ==
Updated January 3, 2025.

- 1st district: Diana DeGette (D) (since 1997)
- 2nd district: Joe Neguse (D) (since 2019)
- 3rd district: Jeff Hurd (R) (since 2025)
- 4th district: Lauren Boebert (R) (since 2021)
- 5th district: Jeff Crank (R) (since 2025)
- 6th district: Jason Crow (D) (since 2019)
- 7th district: Brittany Pettersen (D) (since 2023)
- 8th district: Gabe Evans (R) (since 2025)

== List of members and delegates ==
Member / delegate	Party	District	Years	Notes
Wayne Allard	Republican	4th	January 3, 1991 – January 3, 1997	Elected in 1990. Re-elected in 1992. Re-elected in 1994. Retired to run for U.S. Senator.
William L. Armstrong	Republican	5th	January 3, 1973 – January 3, 1979	Elected in 1972. Re-elected in 1974. Re-elected in 1976. Retired to run for U.S. senator.
Wayne N. Aspinall	Democratic	4th	January 3, 1949 – January 3, 1973	Elected in 1948. Re-elected in 1950. Re-elected in 1952. Re-elected in 1954. Re-elected in 1956. Re-elected in 1958. Re-elected in 1960. Re-elected in 1962. Re-elected in 1964. Re-elected in 1966. Re-elected in 1968. Re-elected in 1970. Lost renomination to Alan Merson.
Bob Beauprez	Republican	7th	January 3, 2003 – January 3, 2007	Elected in 2002. Re-elected in 2004. Retired after running for Governor of Colorado.
James B. Belford	Republican	At-large	October 3, 1876 – December 13, 1877	Elected in 1876. Lost contested election to Patterson.
James B. Belford	Republican	At-large	March 4, 1879 – March 3, 1885	Elected in 1878. Re-elected in 1880. Re-elected in 1882. Lost renomination to Symes.
John Calhoun Bell	Populist	2nd	March 4, 1893 – March 3, 1903	Elected in 1892. Re-elected in 1894. Re-elected in 1896. Re-elected in 1898. Re-elected in 1900. Lost re-election to Hogg.
Hiram Pitt Bennet	Conservative; Republican	Territory	August 19, 1861 – March 3, 1865	Elected in 1861. Re-elected in 1862. Retired.
Lauren Boebert	Republican	3rd	January 3, 2021 – January 3, 2025	Elected in 2020. Re-elected in 2022. Moved to the 4th district.
Lauren Boebert	Republican	4th	January 3, 2025 – present	Moved from the 3rd district and re-elected in 2024.
Robert W. Bonynge	Republican	1st	February 16, 1904 – March 3, 1909	Won contested election after Shafroth declared his conviction that his opponent was actually elected. Re-elected in 1904. Re-elected in 1906. Lost re-election to Rucker.
Allen Alexander Bradford	Republican	Territory	March 4, 1865 – March 3, 1867	Elected in 1864. Retired.
Allen Alexander Bradford	Republican	Territory	March 4, 1869 – March 3, 1871	Elected in 1868. Retired.
Franklin E. Brooks	Republican	At-large	March 4, 1903 – March 3, 1907	Elected in 1902. Re-elected in 1904. Retired.
Donald G. Brotzman	Republican	2nd	January 3, 1963 – January 3, 1965	Elected in 1962. Lost re-election to McVicker.
Donald G. Brotzman	Republican	2nd	January 3, 1967 – January 3, 1975	Elected in 1966. Re-elected in 1968. Re-elected in 1970. Re-elected in 1972. Lost re-election to Wirth.
Hank Brown	Republican	4th	January 3, 1981 – January 3, 1991	Elected in 1980. Re-elected in 1982. Re-elected in 1984. Re-elected in 1986. Re-elected in 1988. Retired to run for U.S. Senator.
Ken Buck	Republican	4th	January 3, 2015 – March 22, 2024	Elected in 2014. Re-elected in 2016. Re-elected in 2018. Re-elected in 2020. Re-elected in 2022. Resigned.
William E. Burney	Democratic	3rd	November 5, 1940 – January 3, 1941	Elected to finish Martin's term. Retired.
Ben Nighthorse Campbell	Democratic	3rd	January 3, 1987 – January 3, 1993	Elected in 1986. Re-elected in 1988. Re-elected in 1990. Retired to run for U.S. senator.
Yadira Caraveo	Democratic	8th	January 3, 2023 – January 3, 2025	Elected in 2022; Lost re-election to Evans.
John A. Carroll	Democratic	1st	January 3, 1947 – January 3, 1951	Elected in 1946. Re-elected in 1948. Retired to run for U.S. senator.
Jerome B. Chaffee	Republican	Territory	March 4, 1871 – March 3, 1875	Elected in 1870. Re-elected in 1872. Retired.
John Chenoweth	Republican	3rd	January 3, 1941 – January 3, 1949	Elected in 1940. Re-elected in 1942. Re-elected in 1944. Re-elected in 1946. Lost re-election to Marsalis.
John Chenoweth	Republican	3rd	January 3, 1951 – January 3, 1965	Re-elected in 1950. Re-elected in 1952. Re-elected in 1954. Re-elected in 1956. Re-elected in 1958. Re-elected in 1960. Re-elected in 1962. Lost re-election to Evans.
George M. Chilcott	Republican	Territory	March 4, 1867 – March 3, 1869	Elected in 1866. Retired.
Mike Coffman	Republican	6th	January 3, 2009 – January 3, 2019	Elected in 2008. Re-elected in 2010. Re-elected in 2012. Re-elected in 2014. Re-elected in 2016. Lost re-election to Crow.
George W. Cook	Republican	At-large	March 4, 1907 – March 3, 1909	Elected in 1906. Retired.
Jeff Crank	Republican	5th	January 3, 2025 – present	Elected in 2024.
Jason Crow	Democratic	6th	January 3, 2019 – present	Elected in 2018. Re-elected in 2020. Re-elected in 2022. Re-elected in 2024.
Fred N. Cummings	Democratic	2nd	March 4, 1933 – January 3, 1941	Elected in 1932. Re-elected in 1934. Re-elected in 1936. Re-elected in 1938. Lost re-election to Hill.
Diana DeGette	Democratic	1st	January 3, 1997 – present	Elected in 1996. Re-elected in 1998. Re-elected in 2000. Re-elected in 2002. Re-elected in 2004. Re-elected in 2006. Re-elected in 2008. Re-elected in 2010. Re-elected in 2012. Re-elected in 2014. Re-elected in 2016. Re-elected in 2018. Re-elected in 2020. Re-elected in 2022. Re-elected in 2024.
Peter H. Dominick	Republican	2nd	January 3, 1961 – January 3, 1963	Elected in 1960. Retired to Run for U.S. senator.
William R. Eaton	Republican	1st	March 4, 1929 – March 3, 1933	Elected in 1928. Re-elected in 1930. Lost re-election to Lewis.
Frank Evans	Democratic	3rd	January 3, 1965 – January 3, 1979	Elected in 1964. Re-elected in 1966. Re-elected in 1968. Re-elected in 1970. Re-elected in 1972. Re-elected in 1974. Re-elected in 1976. Retired.
Gabe Evans	Republican	8th	January 3, 2025 – present	Elected in 2024.
Cory Gardner	Republican	4th	January 3, 2011 – January 3, 2015	Elected in 2010. Re-elected in 2012. Retired to run for U.S. Senator.
Dean M. Gillespie	Republican	1st	March 7, 1944 – January 3, 1947	Elected to finish Lewis's term. Re-elected in 1944. Lost re-election to Carroll.
Warren A. Haggott	Republican	2nd	March 4, 1907 – March 3, 1909	Elected in 1906. Lost re-election to Martin.
Guy U. Hardy	Republican	3rd	March 4, 1919 – March 3, 1933	Elected in 1918. Re-elected in 1920. Re-elected in 1922. Re-elected in 1924. Re-elected in 1926. Re-elected in 1928. Re-elected in 1930. Lost re-election to Martin.
Joel Hefley	Republican	5th	January 3, 1987 – January 3, 2007	Elected in 1986. Re-elected in 1988. Re-elected in 1990. Re-elected in 1992. Re-elected in 1994. Re-elected in 1996. Re-elected in 1998. Re-elected in 2000. Re-elected in 2002. Re-elected in 2004. Retired.
William S. Hill	Republican	2nd	January 3, 1941 – January 3, 1959	Elected in 1940. Re-elected in 1942. Re-elected in 1944. Re-elected in 1946. Re-elected in 1948. Re-elected in 1950. Re-elected in 1952. Re-elected in 1954. Re-elected in 1956. Retired.
Benjamin Hilliard	Democratic	1st	March 4, 1915 – March 3, 1919	Elected in 1914. Re-elected in 1916. Lost re-election to Vaile.
Herschel M. Hogg	Republican	2nd	March 4, 1903 – March 3, 1907	Elected in 1902; Re-elected in 1904. Retired.
Jeff Hurd	Republican	3rd	January 3, 2025 – present	Elected in 2024.
Byron L. Johnson	Democratic	2nd	January 3, 1959 – January 3, 1961	Elected in 1958. Lost re-election to Dominick.
Jim Johnson	Republican	4th	January 3, 1973 – January 3, 1981	Elected in 1972. Re-elected in 1974. Re-elected in 1976. Re-elected in 1978. Retired.
Edward Keating	Democratic	At-large	March 4, 1913 – March 3, 1915	Elected in 1912. Redistricted to the 3rd district.
Edward Keating	Democratic	3rd	March 4, 1915 – March 3, 1919	Redistricted from the at-large district and re-elected in 1914. Re-elected in 1916. Lost re-election to Hardy.
George John Kindel	Democratic	1st	March 4, 1913 – March 3, 1915	Elected in 1912. Retired to run for U.S. senator.
Raymond P. Kogovsek	Democratic	3rd	January 3, 1979 – January 3, 1985	Elected in 1978. Re-elected in 1980. Re-elected in 1982. Retired.
Ken Kramer	Republican	5th	January 3, 1979 – January 3, 1987	Elected in 1978. Re-elected in 1980. Re-elected in 1982. Re-elected in 1984. Retired to run for U.S. senator.
Doug Lamborn	Republican	5th	January 3, 2007 – January 3, 2025	Elected in 2006. Re-elected in 2008. Re-elected in 2010. Re-elected in 2012. Re-elected in 2014. Re-elected in 2016. Re-elected in 2018. Re-elected in 2020. Re-elected in 2022. Retired.
Lawrence Lewis	Democratic	1st	March 4, 1933 – December 9, 1943	Elected in 1932. Re-elected in 1934. Re-elected in 1936. Re-elected in 1938. Re-elected in 1940. Re-elected in 1942. Died.
Greg Lopez	Republican	4th	June 25, 2024 – January 3, 2025	Elected to finish Buck's term Retired.
Betsy Markey	Democratic	4th	January 3, 2009 – January 3, 2011	Elected in 2008. Lost re-election to Gardner.
John H. Marsalis	Democratic	3rd	January 3, 1949 – January 3, 1951	Elected in 1948. Lost re-election to Chenoweth.
John Andrew Martin	Democratic	2nd	March 4, 1909 – March 3, 1913	Elected in 1908. Re-elected in 1910. Retired.
John Andrew Martin	Democratic	3rd	March 4, 1933 – December 23, 1939	Elected in 1932. Re-elected in 1934. Re-elected in 1936. Re-elected in 1938. Died.
Scott McInnis	Republican	3rd	January 3, 1993 – January 3, 2005	Elected in 1992. Re-elected in 1994. Re-elected in 1996. Re-elected in 1998. Re-elected in 2000. Re-elected in 2002. Retired.
Mike McKevitt	Republican	1st	January 3, 1971 – January 3, 1973	Elected in 1970. Lost re-election to Schroeder.
Roy H. McVicker	Democratic	2nd	January 3, 1965 – January 3, 1967	Elected in 1964. Lost re-election to Brotzman.
Marilyn Musgrave	Republican	4th	January 3, 2003 – January 3, 2009	Elected in 2002. Re-elected in 2004. Re-elected in 2006. Lost re-election to Markey.
Joe Neguse	Democratic	2nd	January 3, 2019 – present	Elected in 2018. Re-elected in 2020. Re-elected in 2022. Re-elected in 2024.
Thomas M. Patterson	Democratic	Territory	March 4, 1875 –August 1, 1876	Elected in 1874. Colorado achieved statehood.
Thomas M. Patterson	Democratic	At-large	December 13, 1877– March 3, 1879	Won contested election. Retired.
Lafe Pence	Populist	1st	March 4, 1893 – March 3, 1895	Elected in 1892. Lost re-election to Shafroth.
Ed Perlmutter	Democratic	7th	January 3, 2007 – January 3, 2023	Elected in 2006. Re-elected in 2008. Re-elected in 2010. Re-elected in 2012. Re-elected in 2014. Re-elected in 2016. Re-elected in 2018. Re-elected in 2020. Retired.
Brittany Pettersen	Democratic	7th	January 3, 2023 – present	Elected in 2022. Re-elected in 2024.
Jared Polis	Democratic	2nd	January 3, 2009 – January 3, 2019	Elected in 2008. Re-elected in 2010. Re-elected in 2012. Re-elected in 2014. Re-elected in 2016. Retired after being elected Governor of Colorado.
Robert F. Rockwell	Republican	4th	December 9, 1941 – January 3, 1949	Elected to finish Taylor's term. Re-elected in 1942. Re-elected in 1944. Re-elected in 1946. Lost re-election to Aspinall.
Byron G. Rogers	Democratic	1st	January 3, 1951 – January 3, 1971	Elected in 1950. Re-elected in 1952. Re-elected in 1954. Re-elected in 1956. Re-elected in 1958. Re-elected in 1960. Re-elected in 1962. Re-elected in 1964. Re-elected in 1966. Re-elected in 1968. Lost re-nomination to Craig S. Barnes.
Atterson W. Rucker	Democratic	1st	March 4, 1909 – March 3, 1913	Elected in 1908. Re-elected in 1910. Lost renomination to Kindel.
John Salazar	Democratic	3rd	January 3, 2005 – January 3, 2011	Elected in 2004. Re-elected in 2006. Re-elected in 2008. Lost re-election to Tipton.
Daniel Schaefer	Republican	6th	March 29, 1983 – January 3, 1999	Elected to begin Jack Swigert's term, who died before taking office. Re-elected in 1984. Re-elected in 1986. Re-elected in 1988. Re-elected in 1990. Re-elected in 1992. Re-elected in 1994. Re-elected in 1996. Retired.
Bob Schaffer	Republican	4th	January 3, 1997 – January 3, 2003	Elected in 1996. Re-elected in 1998. Re-elected in 2000. Retired.
Pat Schroeder	Democratic	1st	January 3, 1973 – January 3, 1997	Elected in 1972. Re-elected in 1974. Re-elected in 1976. Re-elected in 1978. Re-elected in 1980. Re-elected in 1982. Re-elected in 1984. Re-elected in 1986. Re-elected in 1988. Re-elected in 1990. Re-elected in 1992. Re-elected in 1994. Retired.
Harry H. Seldomridge	Democratic	2nd	March 4, 1913 – March 3, 1915	Elected in 1912. Lost re-election to Timberlake.
John F. Shafroth	Republican	1st	March 4, 1895 – March 3, 1897	Elected in 1894.
John F. Shafroth	Silver Republican	1st	March 4, 1897 – March 3, 1903	Re-elected in 1896 as a Silver Republican. Re-elected in 1898. Re-elected in 1900.
John F. Shafroth	Democratic	1st	March 4, 1903 – February 15, 1904	Re-elected in 1902 as a Democrat. Resigned after declaring his conviction that his opponent was actually elected.
David Skaggs	Democratic	2nd	January 3, 1987 – January 3, 1999	Elected in 1986. Re-elected in 1988. Re-elected in 1990. Re-elected in 1992. Re-elected in 1994. Re-elected in 1996. Retired.
Michael L. Strang	Republican	3rd	January 3, 1985 – January 3, 1987	Elected in 1984. Lost re-election to Campbell.
George G. Symes	Republican	At-large	March 4, 1885 – March 3, 1889	Elected in 1884. Re-elected in 1886. Retired.
Tom Tancredo	Republican	6th	January 3, 1999 – January 3, 2009	Elected in 1998. Re-elected in 2000. Re-elected in 2002. Re-elected in 2004. Re-elected in 2006. Retired.
Edward T. Taylor	Democratic	At-large	March 4, 1909 – March 3, 1915	Elected in 1908. Re-elected in 1910. Re-elected in 1912. Redistricted to the 4th district.
Edward T. Taylor	Democratic	4th	March 4, 1915 – September 3, 1941	Redistricted from the at-large district and re-elected in 1914. Re-elected in 1916. Re-elected in 1918. Re-elected in 1920. Re-elected in 1922. Re-elected in 1924. Re-elected in 1926. Re-elected in 1928. Re-elected in 1930. Re-elected in 1932. Re-elected in 1934. Re-elected in 1936. Re-elected in 1938. Re-elected in 1940. Died.
Charles B. Timberlake	Republican	2nd	March 4, 1915 – March 3, 1933	Elected in 1914. Re-elected in 1916. Re-elected in 1918. Re-elected in 1920. Re-elected in 1922. Re-elected in 1924. Re-elected in 1926. Re-elected in 1928. Re-elected in 1930. Lost renomination to George H. Bradfield.
Scott Tipton	Republican	3rd	January 3, 2011 – January 3, 2021	Elected in 2010. Re-elected in 2012. Re-elected in 2014. Re-elected in 2016. Re-elected in 2018. Lost renomination to Boebert.
Hosea Townsend	Republican	At-large	March 4, 1889 – March 3, 1893	Elected in 1888. Re-elected in 1890. Redistricted to the 2nd district and lost renomination to Earl B. Coe.
Mark Udall	Democratic	2nd	January 3, 1999 – January 3, 2009	Elected in 1998. Re-elected in 2000. Re-elected in 2002. Re-elected in 2004. Re-elected in 2006. Retired after being elected to the U.S. Senate.
William N. Vaile	Republican	1st	March 4, 1919 – July 2, 1927	Elected in 1918. Re-elected in 1920. Re-elected in 1922. Re-elected in 1924. Re-elected in 1926. Died.
S. Harrison White	Democratic	1st	November 15, 1927 – March 3, 1929	Elected to finish Vaile's term. Lost re-election to Eaton.
Tim Wirth	Democratic	2nd	January 3, 1975 – January 3, 1987	Elected in 1974. Re-elected in 1976. Re-elected in 1978. Re-elected in 1980. Re-elected in 1982. Re-elected in 1984. Retired to Run for U.S. senator.

== See also ==
- Colorado's congressional delegations
- Colorado's congressional districts
- List of United States senators from Colorado
