= Colorado's congressional districts =

U.S. electoral districts

Map of Colorado's congressional districts since 2023 Interactive map version

Colorado is divided into eight congressional districts, each represented by a member of the United States House of Representatives.

The Territory of Colorado was represented by one non-voting Delegate to the United States House of Representatives from its organization on Thursday, February 2, 1861, until statehood on Tuesday, August 1, 1876. The state of Colorado was represented by one United States representative elected at-large from statehood in 1876 until the end of the 52nd United States Congress in 1893. Colorado was represented by two United States representatives elected from two congressional districts from 1893 until the end of the 57th United States Congress in 1903. Colorado was represented by three United States representatives elected from two districts and one at-large from 1903 until the end of the 62nd United States Congress in 1913. Colorado was represented by four United States representatives elected from two districts and two at-large in the 63rd United States Congress from 1913 until 1915.

Since the 1914 United States House of Representatives elections, all U.S. representatives from the state of Colorado have been elected from congressional districts. Colorado has been represented by four United States representatives from 1913 until the end of the 92nd United States Congress in 1973, five United States representatives from 1973 until the end of the 97th United States Congress in 1983, six United States representatives from 1983 until the end of the 107th United States Congress in 2003, seven United States representatives from 2003 until the end of the 117th United States Congress in 2023, and eight United States representatives since 2023.

== Current districts and representatives ==
This is a list of United States representatives from Colorado, their terms, their district boundaries, and their district political ratings according to the CPVI. The delegation has a total of eight members, currently four Democrats and four Republicans.

Current U.S. representatives from Colorado
District	Member (Hometown)	Party	Incumbent since	CPVI (2025)	District map
1st	Diana DeGette (Denver)	Democratic	January 3, 1997	D+29	Map of Colorado's 1st congressional district
2nd	Joe Neguse (Lafayette)	Democratic	January 3, 2019	D+20	Map of Colorado's 2nd congressional district
3rd	Jeff Hurd (Grand Junction)	Republican	January 3, 2025	R+5	Map of Colorado's 3rd congressional district
4th	Lauren Boebert (Windsor)	Republican	January 3, 2025	R+9	Map of Colorado's 4th congressional district
5th	Jeff Crank (Colorado Springs)	Republican	January 3, 2025	R+5	Map of Colorado's 5th congressional district
6th	Jason Crow (Aurora)	Democratic	January 3, 2019	D+11	Map of Colorado's 6th congressional district
7th	Brittany Pettersen (Lakewood)	Democratic	January 3, 2023	D+8	Map of Colorado's 7th congressional district
8th	Gabe Evans (Fort Lupton)	Republican	January 3, 2025	EVEN	Map of Colorado's 8th congressional district

== Historical and present district boundaries ==
Table of United States congressional district boundary maps in the state of Colorado, presented chronologically. All redistricting events that took place in Colorado between 1973 and 2013 are shown.

Year	Statewide map	Denver highlight
1973–1983		
1983–1993		
1993–2003		
2003–2013		
2013-2022		
Since 2023		

== Obsolete districts ==
- Colorado's at-large congressional district

== See also ==
- Colorado's congressional delegations
- List of United States senators from Colorado
- List of United States representatives from Colorado
