= Michael L. Strang =

American politician (1929–2014)

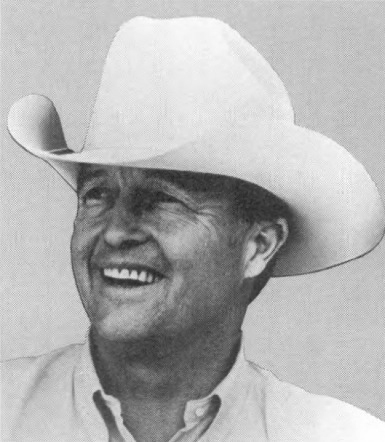

Member of the U.S. House of Representatives from Colorado's 3rd district
- In office January 3, 1985 – January 3, 1987
- Preceded by: Ray Kogovsek
- Succeeded by: Ben Nighthorse Campbell

Member of the Colorado House of Representatives
- In office 1971–1975
- Preceded by: John D. Vanderhoof
- Succeeded by: Nancy Dick

Personal details
- Born: Michael Lathrop Strang; June 17, 1929 New Hope, Pennsylvania
- Died: January 12, 2014 (aged 84) Carbondale, Colorado
- Party: Republican
- Spouse: Kathleen "Kit" Sherry
- Children: 4
- Education: Princeton University (A.B.)
- Occupation: investment banker, rancher

Michael Lathrop "Mike" Strang (June 17, 1929 – January 12, 2014) was an American politician who was a one-term Republican U.S. Representative from Colorado from 1985 to 1987.

== Early life ==
Born in New Hope, Pennsylvania, Strang was the grandson of landscape painter William Langson Lathrop. His family moved to Colorado in 1932, where he was raised and homeschooled at their ranch near Golden.

== Korean War ==
He served as a second lieutenant in the United States Army from 1950 to 1953.

== Education ==
Strang graduated with an A.B. in history from Princeton University in 1956 after completing a senior thesis titled "Law, Politics and Religion: The Mercury View." He then did graduate work at the University of Geneva in Switzerland.

== Career ==
He was a rancher and investment banker from 1957 to 1985.

Strang served in the Colorado House of Representatives from 1970 to 1974, where he notably introduced legislation to legalize and regulate the sale and consumption of marijuana.

=== Congress ===
In 1984, he was elected as a Republican to the Ninety-ninth Congress, defeating W Mitchell. He was an unsuccessful candidate for reelection in 1986, losing to Ben Nighthorse Campbell.

== Later career and death ==
He resumed horse and cattle ranching and worked as a consultant on natural resources and taxes. He was a resident of Carbondale, Colorado until his death there on January 12, 2014.

== Electoral history ==
1984 United States House of Representatives elections
Party	Candidate	Votes	%
Republican	Michael L. Strang	122,669	57%
Democratic	W. Mitchell	90,963	42%
Libertarian	Robert Jahelka	1,358	0.5%
Independent	Henry John Olshaw	880	0.5%
Total votes		215,870	100%
Republican gain from Democratic			

1986 United States House of Representatives elections
Party	Candidate	Votes	%
Democratic	Ben Nighthorse Campbell	95,353	52%
Republican	Michael L. Strang (Incumbent)	88,508	48%
Total votes		183,861	100%
Democratic gain from Republican			

U.S. House of Representatives
Preceded by Ray Kogovsek	Member of the U.S. House of Representatives from Colorado's 3rd congressional district 1985–1987	Succeeded by Ben Nighthorse Campbell
