= Harry H. Seldomridge =

American politician (1864–1927)

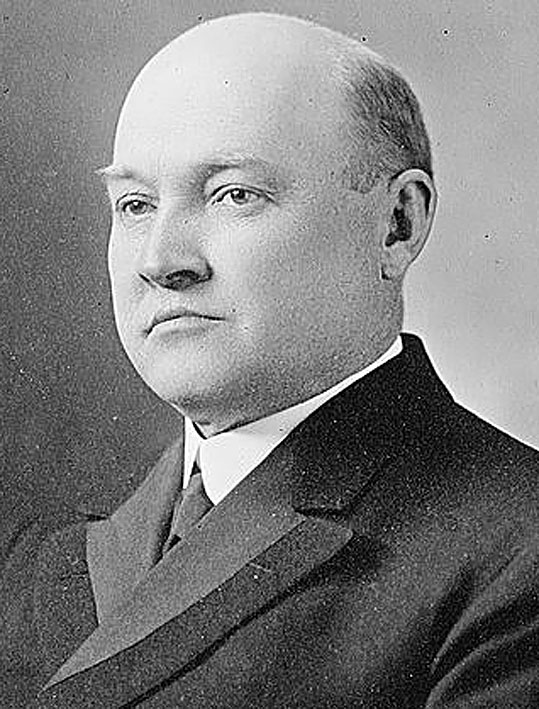

Member of the U.S. House of Representatives from Colorado's 2nd district
- In office March 4, 1913 – March 3, 1915
- Preceded by: John Andrew Martin
- Succeeded by: Charles B. Timberlake

Personal details
- Born: Harry Hunter Seldomridge; October 1, 1864 Philadelphia, Pennsylvania
- Died: November 2, 1927 (aged 63) Colorado Springs, Colorado
- Resting place: Evergreen Cemetery
- Party: Democratic
- Education: Colorado College

Harry Hunter Seldomridge (October 1, 1864 – November 2, 1927) was an American businessman and politician who served one term as a U.S. representative from Colorado from 1913 to 1915.

== Biography ==
Born in Philadelphia, Pennsylvania, Seldomridge attended the public schools of Philadelphia. He moved to Colorado Springs, Colorado, in February 1878. He graduated from Colorado College at Colorado Springs in 1885.

=== Business career ===
He worked as the City editor of the Colorado Springs Gazette from 1886 to 1888. He engaged in the grain and hay business in 1888.

=== Early political career ===
He served as a delegate to the Democratic National Convention in 1896, as a member of the State senate from 1896 to 1904, and a member and president of the State charter convention at Colorado Springs in 1909.

=== Congress ===
Seldomridge was elected as a Democrat to the Sixty-third Congress (March 4, 1913 – March 3, 1915). He was an unsuccessful candidate for reelection in 1914 to the Sixty-fourth Congress.

=== Later career ===
He resumed his former business pursuits, and served as Receiver of the Mercantile National Bank of Pueblo from 1915 to 1923. He was appointed public trustee of El Paso County, Colorado, by Governor William Sweet.

=== Death and burial ===
He died at Colorado Springs, Colorado, November 2, 1927. He was interred in Evergreen Cemetery.

U.S. House of Representatives
Preceded by John Andrew Martin	Member of the U.S. House of Representatives from Colorado's 2nd congressional district March 4, 1913 – March 3, 1915	Succeeded by Charles B. Timberlake
