= William E. Burney =

American businessman and politician

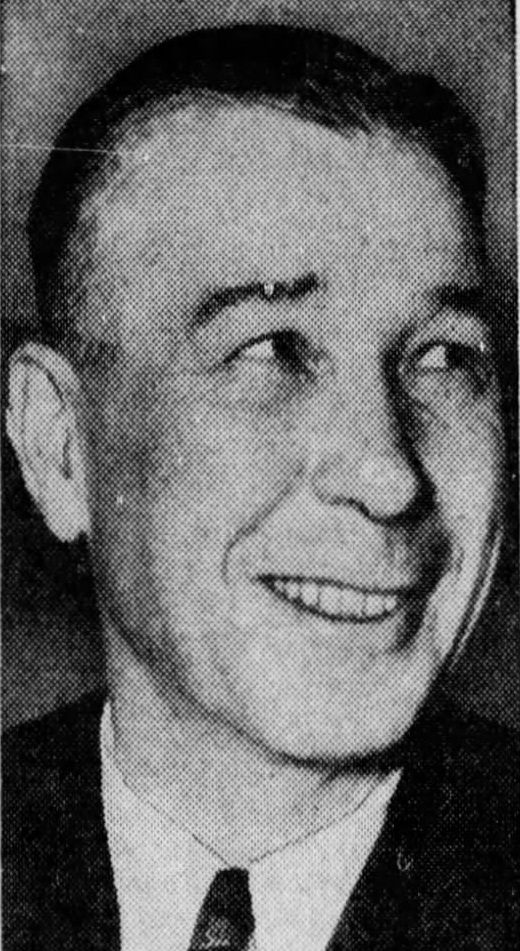
- November 1940 Newspaper Enterprise Association photo published in newspapers nationwide following Burney's election to Congress.

Member of the U.S. House of Representatives from Colorado's 3rd district
- In office November 5, 1940 – January 3, 1941
- Preceded by: John Andrew Martin
- Succeeded by: John Edgar Chenoweth

Personal details
- Born: William Evans Burney; January 29, 1893 Hubbard, Texas, U.S.
- Died: September 11, 1969 (aged 76) Denver, Colorado, U.S.
- Resting place: Fairmount Cemetery
- Party: Democratic Party
- Education: University of New Mexico at Albuquerque

Military service
- Allegiance: United States
- Years of service: 1924–1942

William Evans Burney (September 11, 1893 – January 29, 1969) was an American businessman and politician who briefly served as a Democratic U.S. Representative from Colorado from 1940 to 1941. He was elected to fill the vacancy created by the death of Representative John Andrew Martin.

== Early life and career ==
Born in Hubbard, Texas, Burney attended the public schools in Texas and the University of New Mexico at Albuquerque. During the First World War, he served in the United States Navy. He moved to Pueblo, Colorado, in 1924 and built a career in the life insurance business. He served as member of the Pueblo board of education from 1937 to 1943. He also served as member of the United States Army Reserve Corps 1924 to 1942, eventually earning the rank of major.

== Election to Congress ==
Burney was elected as a Democrat to the Seventy-sixth Congress to fill the vacancy caused by the death of John A. Martin. The seat had been vacant for nearly a year as Martin had died late in 1939.

Burney served from November 5, 1940, to January 3, 1941 and did not seek re-election to a full term in the Seventy-seventh Congress.

== Career after Congress ==
He was called to active duty in the Army in January 1942 and was promoted to the rank of lieutenant colonel in October 1942. He returned to the United States from India and took command of Camp Ross in May 1945. He left the service in December 1945 with the rank of colonel.

After leaving the military, he resumed his career in the life insurance business until his retirement.

== Death and burial ==
He died in Denver, Colorado, January 29, 1969 and was interred in Fairmount Cemetery in Denver.

== Electoral history ==
1940 Colorado's 3rd congressional district special election
Party	Candidate	Votes	%
Democratic	William E. Burney	68,225	51%
Republican	Henry Leonard	65,675	49%
Total votes		133,900	100%
Democratic hold			

U.S. House of Representatives
Preceded by John Andrew Martin	Member of the U.S. House of Representatives from Colorado's 3rd congressional district 1940–1941	Succeeded by John Edgar Chenoweth
