= John H. Marsalis =

American politician (1904–1971)

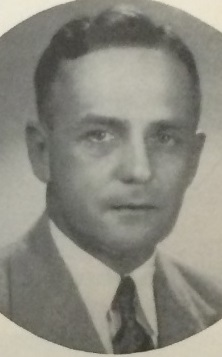
- From 1949's Pictorial Directory of the Eighty-First Congress

Member of the U.S. House of Representatives from Colorado's 3rd district
- In office January 3, 1949 – January 3, 1951
- Preceded by: John Edgar Chenoweth
- Succeeded by: John Edgar Chenoweth

Personal details
- Born: John Henry Marsalis; May 9, 1904 McComb, Pike County, Mississippi, U.S.
- Died: June 26, 1971 (aged 67) Pueblo, Colorado, U.S.
- Resting place: Roselawn Cemetery
- Party: Democratic
- Education: University of Mississippi, University of Colorado Law School

John Henry Marsalis (May 9, 1904 – June 26, 1971) was an American lawyer and politician who served one term as a U.S. representative from Colorado from 1949 to 1951.

== Early life and education ==
Born in McComb, Pike County, Mississippi, Marsalis attended the public schools of McComb, Mississippi. He moved with his parents to Colorado Springs, Colorado, in 1922, reportedly for the benefit of his father's health. He graduated from Colorado Springs High School in 1923 and enrolled as a student at the University of Mississippi in 1925 and 1926. He graduated from the University of Colorado Law School in 1934.

== Career ==
He was admitted to the bar on March 14, 1935, and commenced the practice of law in Pueblo, Colorado. He was an investigator in district attorney's office in Pueblo in 1935 and 1936.

=== Military service ===
He entered the United States Army on May 11, 1942, assigned to the Weather Squadron, United States Army Air Forces, and was discharged on June 16, 1945. He was a sergeant while running for office in November 1944.

=== Political career ===
Marsalis was elected district attorney, tenth judicial district of Colorado, in 1944 and took oath of office while on furlough on January 9, 1945. He assumed his duties upon release from Army and served until December 1948.

Marsalis was elected as a Democrat to the 81st Congress (January 3, 1949 – January 3, 1951). He was an unsuccessful candidate for reelection in 1950 to the 82nd Congress and for election in 1952 to the 83rd Congress.

He was appointed city attorney on December 15, 1952, and served in that capacity until elected district judge, tenth judicial district of Colorado, in November 1954. He served in that office until his retirement on February 28, 1962.

== Personal life ==
He was unmarried. He lived in Pueblo, Colorado, where he died June 26, 1971. He was interred in Roselawn Cemetery.

== Electoral history ==
1948 United States House of Representatives elections
Party	Candidate	Votes	%
Democratic	John H. Marsalis	65,114	51%
Republican	John Chenoweth (Incumbent)	63,312	49%
Total votes		128,426	100%
Democratic gain from Republican			

1950 United States House of Representatives elections
Party	Candidate	Votes	%
Republican	John Chenoweth	58,831	52%
Democratic	John H. Marsalis (Incumbent)	55,110	48%
Total votes		113,941	100%
Republican gain from Democratic			

1952 United States House of Representatives elections
Party	Candidate	Votes	%
Republican	John Chenoweth (Incumbent)	84,739	58%
Democratic	John H. Marsalis	62,025	42%
Total votes		146,764	100%
Republican hold			

U.S. House of Representatives
Preceded by John Edgar Chenoweth	Member of the U.S. House of Representatives from Colorado's 3rd congressional district 1949–1951	Succeeded by John Edgar Chenoweth
