= Colorado's 3rd congressional district =

U.S. House district for Colorado

Coordinates: 38°44′36″N 107°20′42″W

- Interactive map of district boundaries since January 3, 2023.
- Representative: Jeff Hurd; R–Grand Junction
- Distribution: 64.75% rural; 35.25% urban
- Population (2025): 740,899
- Median household income: $77,493
- Ethnicity: 66.7% White; 25.7% Hispanic; 3.8% Two or more races; 1.4% Native American; 0.8% Black; 0.8% Asian; 0.6% other
- Cook PVI: R+5

Colorado's 3rd congressional district is a congressional district in the U.S. state of Colorado. It takes in most of the rural Western Slope in the state's western third portion, with a wing in the south taking in some of the southern portions of the Eastern Plains. It includes the cities of Grand Junction, Montrose, Durango, Aspen, Glenwood Springs, and Pueblo. The district has been represented by Republican Jeff Hurd since 2025.

The district was represented from 1987 to 1993 by Ben Nighthorse Campbell before he ran for the U.S. Senate and switched parties from Democratic to Republican. The district's former representative Scott Tipton lost renomination in 2020 to Lauren Boebert in what was considered a major upset. Boebert won the general election on November 3, 2020, and narrowly won re-election in the closest House race of 2022.

The district is mainly rural and leans Republican, though not as much as the neighboring 4th district. However, the Democrats have a strong base in counties on the I-70 corridor and Pueblo, as well as ski towns such as Aspen, thus keeping the seat competitive.

== History ==
=== 1990s ===
Following the 1990 U.S. census and associated realignment of Colorado congressional districts, the 3rd congressional district consisted of Alamosa, Archuleta, Chaffee, Conejos, Costilla, Delta, Dolores, Eagle, Garfield, Grand, Gunnison, Hinsdale, Huerfano, Jackson, Lake, La Plata, Mesa, Mineral, Moffat, Montezuma, Montrose, Ouray, Park, Pitkin, Pueblo, Rio Blanco, Rio Grande, Routt, Saguache, San Juan, San Miguel, and Summit counties, as well as portions of Douglas, Fremont, and Jefferson counties.

=== 2000s ===
Following the 2000 U.S. census and realignment of congressional districts, the 3rd congressional district consisted of Alamosa, Archuleta, Conejos, Costilla, Custer, Delta, Dolores, Garfield, Gunnison, Hinsdale, Huerfano, Jackson, La Plata, Las Animas, Mesa, Mineral, Moffat, Montezuma, Montrose, Ouray, Pitkin, Pueblo, Rio Blanco, Rio Grande, Routt, Saguache, San Juan, and San Miguel counties and most of Otero County.

=== 2010s ===
Following the 2010 U.S. census and realignment of congressional districts, the 3rd congressional district underwent very little change, and continued to cover 27 of the previous counties, excluding Las Animas and Otero counties.

=== 2020s ===
Following the 2020 U.S. census and realignment of congressional districts, the 3rd congressional district lost Jackson County, Routt County, and most of Eagle County to the 2nd district as well as Custer and Lake counties to the 7th district. It also gained Las Animas and Otero counties from the 4th district. This configuration of the district took effect starting from the 2022 elections.

== Characteristics ==
The district has two major population centers, in Grand Junction and Pueblo. The two cities and their surrounding rural areas provide a competitive arena for congressional races. Grand Junction, on the Western Slope, is a Republican stronghold, while Pueblo, a town with a large Latino population and (by Colorado norms) a heavily unionized workforce, provides a base of support for Democrats.

The Denver Post describes the district as:

The district is red-leaning, and it covers nearly half of Colorado's land mass, including western and southern Colorado, and 29 of the state's 64 counties. It's also diverse, with wealthy ski towns like Aspen, giant swaths of agricultural land and public lands, and middle-class cities like Grand Junction and Pueblo.

— Alex Burness, Denver Post (November 3, 2020)

== Composition ==
For the 118th and successive Congresses (based on redistricting following the 2020 census), the district contains all or portions of the following counties and communities:

Alamosa County (3)

All 3 communities

Archuleta County (2)

Arboles, Pagosa Springs

Conejos County (2)

All 7 communities

Costilla County (4)

All 4 communities

Delta County (7)

All 7 communities

Dolores County (2)

Dove Creek, Rico

Eagle County (4)

Basalt (shared with Pitkin County), Dotsero, El Jebel, Gypsum (part; also 2nd)

Garfield County (13)

All 13 communities

Gunnison County (6)

All 6 communities

Hinsdale County (3)

All 3 communities

Huerfano County (3)

All 3 communities

La Plata County (5)

All 5 communities

Las Animas County (6)

All 6 communities

Mesa County (10)

All 10 communities

Mineral County (1)

Creede

Moffat County (3)

All 3 communities

Montezuma County (5)

All 5 communities

Montrose County (5)

All 5 communities

Otero County (5)

All 5 communities

Ouray County (5)

All 5 communities

Pitkin County (6)

All 6 communities

Pueblo County (10)

All 10 communities

Rio Blanco County (2)

Meeker, Rangely

Rio Grande County (6)

All 6 communities

Saguache County (5)

All 5 communities

San Juan County (1)

Silverton

San Miguel County (6)

All 6 communities

== Recent election results from statewide races ==
Year	Office	Results
2008	President	McCain 50% - 47%
2008	Senate	Udall 49% - 46%
2010	Senate	Buck 50% - 44%
2010	Governor	Hickenlooper 47% - 19%
2010	Secretary of State	Gessler 49% - 44%
2010	Treasurer	Stapleton 55% - 45%
2010	Attorney General	Suthers 60% - 40%
2012	President	Romney 54% - 46%
2014	Senate	Gardner 52% - 42%
2016	President	Trump 53% - 39%
2016	Senate	Glenn 51% - 43%
2018	Governor	Stapleton 51% - 45%
2018	Attorney General	Brauchler 53% - 44%
2020	President	Trump 53% - 45%
2020	Senate	Gardner 54% - 44%
2022	Senate	O'Dea 49% - 48%
2022	Governor	Polis 50% - 47%
2022	Secretary of State	Anderson 50% - 47%
2022	Treasurer	Sias 51% - 45%
2022	Attorney General	Kellner 51% - 46%
2024	President	Trump 54% - 44%

== List of members representing the district ==
Member (District home)	Party	Term duration	Cong ress	Electoral history	District location
District created March 4, 1915
Edward Keating (Pueblo)	Democratic	March 4, 1915 – March 3, 1919	64th 65th	Redistricted from the at-large district and re-elected in 1914. Re-elected in 1916. Lost re-election.	
Guy Urban Hardy (Canon City)	Republican	March 4, 1919 – March 3, 1933	66th 67th 68th 69th 70th 71st 72nd	Elected in 1918. Re-elected in 1920. Re-elected in 1922. Re-elected in 1924. Re-elected in 1926. Re-elected in 1928. Re-elected in 1930. Lost re-election.	
John Andrew Martin (Pueblo)	Democratic	March 4, 1933 – December 23, 1939	73rd 74th 75th 76th	Elected in 1932. Re-elected in 1934. Re-elected in 1936. Re-elected in 1938. Died.	
Vacant		December 23, 1939 – November 5, 1940	76th		
William Evans Burney (Pueblo)	Democratic	November 5, 1940 – January 3, 1941	76th	Elected to finish Martin's term. Did not run for the next term.	
John Chenoweth (Trinidad)	Republican	January 3, 1941– January 3, 1949	77th 78th 79th 80th	Elected in 1940. Re-elected in 1942. Re-elected in 1944. Re-elected in 1946. Lost re-election.	
John H. Marsalis (Pueblo)	Democratic	January 3, 1949 – January 3, 1951	81st	Elected in 1948. Lost re-election.	
John Chenoweth (Trinidad)	Republican	January 3, 1951 – January 3, 1965	82nd 83rd 84th 85th 86th 87th 88th	Re-elected in 1950. Re-elected in 1952. Re-elected in 1954. Re-elected in 1956. Re-elected in 1958. Re-elected in 1960. Re-elected in 1962. Lost re-election.	
Frank Evans (Pueblo)	Democratic	January 3, 1965 – January 3, 1979	89th 90th 91st 92nd 93rd 94th 95th	Elected in 1964. Re-elected in 1966. Re-elected in 1968. Re-elected in 1970. Re-elected in 1972. Re-elected in 1974. Re-elected in 1976. Retired.	
Ray Kogovsek (Pueblo)	Democratic	January 3, 1979 – January 3, 1985	96th 97th 98th	Elected in 1978. Re-elected in 1980. Re-elected in 1982. Retired.	
Michael L. Strang (Carbondale)	Republican	January 3, 1985 – January 3, 1987	99th	Elected in 1984. Lost re-election.	
Ben Nighthorse Campbell (Ignacio)	Democratic	January 3, 1987 – January 3, 1993	100th 101st 102nd	Elected in 1986. Re-elected in 1988. Re-elected in 1990. Retired to run for U.S. senator.	
Scott McInnis (Glenwood Springs)	Republican	January 3, 1993 – January 3, 2005	103rd 104th 105th 106th 107th 108th	Elected in 1992. Re-elected in 1994. Re-elected in 1996. Re-elected in 1998. Re-elected in 2000. Re-elected in 2002. Retired.	1993–2003 [data missing]
Scott McInnis (Glenwood Springs)	Republican	January 3, 1993 – January 3, 2005	103rd 104th 105th 106th 107th 108th	Elected in 1992. Re-elected in 1994. Re-elected in 1996. Re-elected in 1998. Re-elected in 2000. Re-elected in 2002. Retired.	2003–2013
John Salazar (Manassa)	Democratic	January 3, 2005 – January 3, 2011	109th 110th 111th	Elected in 2004. Re-elected in 2006. Re-elected in 2008. Lost re-election.	2003–2013
Scott Tipton (Cortez)	Republican	January 3, 2011 – January 3, 2021	112th 113th 114th 115th 116th	Elected in 2010. Re-elected in 2012. Re-elected in 2014. Re-elected in 2016. Re-elected in 2018. Lost renomination.	2003–2013
Scott Tipton (Cortez)	Republican	January 3, 2011 – January 3, 2021	112th 113th 114th 115th 116th	Elected in 2010. Re-elected in 2012. Re-elected in 2014. Re-elected in 2016. Re-elected in 2018. Lost renomination.	2013–2023
Lauren Boebert (Silt)	Republican	January 3, 2021 – January 3, 2025	117th 118th	Elected in 2020. Re-elected in 2022. Moved to run in the 4th district.	2013–2023
Lauren Boebert (Silt)	Republican	January 3, 2021 – January 3, 2025	117th 118th	Elected in 2020. Re-elected in 2022. Moved to run in the 4th district.	2023–present
Jeff Hurd (Grand Junction)	Republican	January 3, 2025 – present	119th	Elected in 2024. Re-elected in 2026.	2023–present

== Election results ==
=== 1914 ===
1914 United States House of Representatives elections
Party	Candidate	Votes	%
Democratic	Edward Keating	37,191	53%
Republican	Neil N. McLean	32,567	47%
Total votes		69,758	100%
Democratic win (new seat)			

=== 1916 ===
1916 United States House of Representatives elections
Party	Candidate	Votes	%
Democratic	Edward Keating (Incumbent)	40,183	54%
Republican	George E. McClelland	31,137	42%
Socialist	David McGrew	2,492	3%
Progressive	William G. Francis	443	1%
Total votes		74,255	100%
Democratic hold			

=== 1918 ===
1918 United States House of Representatives elections
Party	Candidate	Votes	%
Republican	Guy U. Hardy	31,715	51%
Democratic	Edward Keating (Incumbent)	29,075	47%
Socialist	Edith Halcomb	1,453	2%
Total votes		62,243	100%
Republican gain from Democratic			

=== 1920 ===
1920 United States House of Representatives elections
Party	Candidate	Votes	%
Republican	Guy U. Hardy (Incumbent)	43,426	58%
Democratic	Samuel J. Burris	31,896	42%
Total votes		75,322	100%
Republican hold			

=== 1922 ===
1922 United States House of Representatives elections
Party	Candidate	Votes	%
Republican	Guy U. Hardy (Incumbent)	43,508	52%
Democratic	Chester B. Horn	39,500	48%
Total votes		83,008	100%
Republican hold			

=== 1924 ===
1924 United States House of Representatives elections
Party	Candidate	Votes	%
Republican	Guy U. Hardy (Incumbent)	53,877	59%
Democratic	Charles B. Hughes	37,976	41%
Total votes		91,853	100%
Republican hold			

=== 1926 ===
1926 United States House of Representatives elections
Party	Candidate	Votes	%
Republican	Guy U. Hardy (Incumbent)	46,916	54%
Democratic	Edmond I. Crockett	40,009	46%
Total votes		86,925	100%
Republican hold			

=== 1928 ===
1928 United States House of Representatives elections
Party	Candidate	Votes	%
Republican	Guy U. Hardy (Incumbent)	64,116	65%
Democratic	Harry A. McIntyre	34,670	35%
Total votes		98,786	100%
Republican hold			

=== 1930 ===
1930 United States House of Representatives elections
Party	Candidate	Votes	%
Republican	Guy U. Hardy (Incumbent)	55,170	61%
Democratic	Guy M. Weybright	35,744	39%
Total votes		90,914	100%
Republican hold			

=== 1932 ===
1932 United States House of Representatives elections
Party	Candidate	Votes	%
Democratic	John Andrew Martin	59,882	51%
Republican	Guy U. Hardy (Incumbent)	57,793	49%
Total votes		117,675	100%
Democratic gain from Republican			

=== 1934 ===
1934 United States House of Representatives elections
Party	Candidate	Votes	%
Democratic	John Andrew Martin (Incumbent)	73,281	64%
Republican	W.O. Peterson	39,753	35%
Socialist	Joseph T. Landis	1,199	1%
Total votes		114,233	100%
Democratic hold			

=== 1936 ===
1936 United States House of Representatives elections
Party	Candidate	Votes	%
Democratic	John Andrew Martin (Incumbent)	74,013	60%
Republican	J. Arthur Phelps	48,871	40%
Total votes		122,884	100%
Democratic hold			

=== 1938 ===
1938 United States House of Representatives elections
Party	Candidate	Votes	%
Democratic	John Andrew Martin (Incumbent)	72,736	57%
Republican	Henry Leonard	54,007	43%
Total votes		126,743	100%
Democratic hold			

=== 1940 (Special) ===
1940 Colorado's 3rd congressional district special election
Party	Candidate	Votes	%
Democratic	William E. Burney	68,225	51%
Republican	Henry Leonard	65,675	49%
Total votes		133,900	100%
Democratic hold			

=== 1940 ===
1940 United States House of Representatives elections
Party	Candidate	Votes	%
Republican	John Chenoweth	70,842	52%
Democratic	Byron G. Rogers	65,269	48%
Total votes		136,111	100%
Republican gain from Democratic			

=== 1942 ===
1942 United States House of Representatives elections
Party	Candidate	Votes	%
Republican	John Chenoweth (Incumbent)	55,838	63%
Democratic	J.C. Jarrett	33,154	37%
Total votes		88,992	100%
Republican hold			

=== 1944 ===
1944 United States House of Representatives elections
Party	Candidate	Votes	%
Republican	John Chenoweth (Incumbent)	69,492	56%
Democratic	Arthur M. Wimmell	53,904	44%
Total votes		123,396	100%
Republican hold			

=== 1946 ===
1946 United States House of Representatives elections
Party	Candidate	Votes	%
Republican	John Chenoweth (Incumbent)	45,043	55%
Democratic	Walter Walford Johnson	37,496	45%
Total votes		82,539	100%
Republican hold			

=== 1948 ===
1948 United States House of Representatives elections
Party	Candidate	Votes	%
Democratic	John H. Marsalis	65,114	51%
Republican	John Chenoweth (Incumbent)	63,312	49%
Total votes		128,426	100%
Democratic gain from Republican			

=== 1950 ===
1950 United States House of Representatives elections
Party	Candidate	Votes	%
Republican	John Chenoweth	58,831	52%
Democratic	John H. Marsalis (Incumbent)	55,110	48%
Total votes		113,941	100%
Republican gain from Democratic			

=== 1952 ===
1952 United States House of Representatives elections
Party	Candidate	Votes	%
Republican	John Chenoweth (Incumbent)	84,739	58%
Democratic	John H. Marsalis	62,025	42%
Total votes		146,764	100%
Republican hold			

=== 1954 ===
1954 United States House of Representatives elections
Party	Candidate	Votes	%
Republican	John Chenoweth (Incumbent)	62,884	53%
Democratic	Alva B. Adams Jr.	55,750	47%
Total votes		118,634	100%
Republican hold			

=== 1956 ===
1956 United States House of Representatives elections
Party	Candidate	Votes	%
Republican	John Chenoweth (Incumbent)	74,196	50%
Democratic	Alva B. Adams Jr.	73,501	50%
Total votes		147,697	100%
Republican hold			

=== 1958 ===
1958 United States House of Representatives elections
Party	Candidate	Votes	%
Republican	John Chenoweth (Incumbent)	63,655	50%
Democratic	Fred M. Betz	63,112	50%
Total votes		126,767	100%
Republican hold			

=== 1960 ===
1960 United States House of Representatives elections
Party	Candidate	Votes	%
Republican	John Chenoweth (Incumbent)	85,825	52%
Democratic	Franklin R. Stewart	79,069	48%
Total votes		164,894	100%
Republican hold			

=== 1962 ===
1962 United States House of Representatives elections
Party	Candidate	Votes	%
Republican	John Chenoweth (Incumbent)	74,848	55%
Democratic	Albert J. Tomsic	62,097	45%
Total votes		136,945	100%
Republican hold			

=== 1964 ===
1964 United States House of Representatives elections
Party	Candidate	Votes	%
Democratic	Frank Evans	85,404	51%
Republican	John Chenoweth (Incumbent)	81,544	49%
Total votes		166,948	100%
Democratic gain from Republican			

=== 1966 ===
1966 United States House of Representatives elections
Party	Candidate	Votes	%
Democratic	Frank Evans (Incumbent)	76,270	52%
Republican	David W. Enoch	71,213	48%
Total votes		147,483	100%
Democratic hold			

=== 1968 ===
1968 United States House of Representatives elections
Party	Candidate	Votes	%
Democratic	Frank Evans (Incumbent)	88,368	52%
Republican	Paul Bradley	81,163	48%
Total votes		169,531	100%
Democratic hold			

=== 1970 ===
1970 United States House of Representatives elections
Party	Candidate	Votes	%
Democratic	Frank Evans (Incumbent)	87,000	64%
Republican	John "Jack" Mitchell Jr.	45,610	33%
Raza Unida	Martin P. Serna	1,828	1%
Peace Independent	Walter Cranson	1,598	1%
American Independent	Henry John Olshaw	652	1%
Total votes		136,688	100%
Democratic hold			

=== 1972 ===
1972 United States House of Representatives elections
Party	Candidate	Votes	%
Democratic	Frank Evans (Incumbent)	107,511	66%
Republican	Chuck Brady	54,556	34%
Total votes		162,067	100%
Democratic hold			

=== 1974 ===
1974 United States House of Representatives elections
Party	Candidate	Votes	%
Democratic	Frank Evans (Incumbent)	91,783	68%
Republican	E. Keith Records	43,298	32%
Total votes		135,081	100%
Democratic hold			

=== 1976 ===
1976 United States House of Representatives elections
Party	Candidate	Votes	%
Democratic	Frank Evans (Incumbent)	89,302	51%
Republican	Melvin Takaki	82,315	47%
Raza Unida	Alfredo Archer	2,429	1%
American Independent	Henry John Olshaw	1,186	1%
Total votes		175,232	100%
Democratic hold			

=== 1978 ===
1978 United States House of Representatives elections
Party	Candidate	Votes	%
Democratic	Raymond P. Kogovsek	69,669	49%
Republican	Harold L. McCormick	69,303	49%
American Independent	Henry John Olshaw	2,475	2%
Total votes		141,447	100%
Democratic hold			

=== 1980 ===
1980 United States House of Representatives elections
Party	Candidate	Votes	%
Democratic	Raymond P. Kogovsek (Incumbent)	105,820	55%
Republican	Harold L. McCormick	84,292	44%
Libertarian	James S. Glennie	2,670	1%
Total votes		192,782	100%
Democratic hold			

=== 1982 ===
1982 United States House of Representatives elections
Party	Candidate	Votes	%
Democratic	Raymond P. Kogovsek (Incumbent)	92,384	53%
Republican	Tom Wiena	77,409	45%
Libertarian	Paul "Stormy" Mohn	2,439	1%
Independent	Henry John Olshaw	656	1%
Total votes		172,888	100%
Democratic hold			

=== 1984 ===
1984 United States House of Representatives elections
Party	Candidate	Votes	%
Republican	Michael L. Strang	122,669	57%
Democratic	W. Mitchell	90,963	42%
Libertarian	Robert Jahelka	1,358	0.5%
Independent	Henry John Olshaw	880	0.5%
Total votes		215,870	100%
Republican gain from Democratic			

=== 1986 ===
1986 United States House of Representatives elections
Party	Candidate	Votes	%
Democratic	Ben Nighthorse Campbell	95,353	52%
Republican	Michael L. Strang (Incumbent)	88,508	48%
Total votes		183,861	100%
Democratic gain from Republican			

=== 1988 ===
1988 United States House of Representatives elections
Party	Candidate	Votes	%
Democratic	Ben Nighthorse Campbell (Incumbent)	169,284	78%
Republican	Jim Zartman	47,625	22%
Total votes		216,909	100%
Democratic hold			

=== 1990 ===
1990 United States House of Representatives elections
Party	Candidate	Votes	%
Democratic	Ben Nighthorse Campbell (Incumbent)	124,487	70%
Republican	Bob Ellis	49,961	28%
Populist	Howard E. Fields	2,859	2%
Total votes		177,307	100%
Democratic hold			

=== 1992 ===
1992 United States House of Representatives elections
Party	Candidate	Votes	%
Republican	Scott McInnis	143,293	55%
Democratic	Mike Callihan	114,480	44%
Populist	Ki R. Nelson	4,189	1%
Total votes		261,962	100%
Republican gain from Democratic			

=== 1994 ===
1994 United States House of Representatives elections
Party	Candidate	Votes	%
Republican	Scott McInnis (Incumbent)	145,365	70%
Democratic	Linda Powers	63,427	30%
Total votes		208,792	100%
Republican hold			

=== 1996 ===
1996 United States House of Representatives elections
Party	Candidate	Votes	%
Republican	Scott McInnis (Incumbent)	183,523	69%
Democratic	Albert Gurule	82,953	31%
Total votes		266,476	100%
Republican hold			

=== 1998 ===
1998 United States House of Representatives elections
Party	Candidate	Votes	%
Republican	Scott McInnis (Incumbent)	156,501	66%
Democratic	Robert Reed Kelley	74,479	32%
Libertarian	Barry Baggert	5,673	2%
Total votes		236,653	100%
Republican hold			

=== 2000 ===
2000 United States House of Representatives elections in Colorado
Party	Candidate	Votes	%
Republican	Scott McInnis (Incumbent)	199,204	66%
Democratic	Curtis Imrie	87,921	29%
Libertarian	Drew Sakson	9,982	3%
Reform	Victor A. Good	5,433	2%
Total votes		302,540	100%
Republican hold			

=== 2002 ===
2002 United States House of Representatives elections in Colorado
Party	Candidate	Votes	%
Republican	Scott McInnis (Incumbent)	143,433	66%
Democratic	Dennis Berckefeldt	68,160	31%
Libertarian	J. Brent Shroyer	4,370	2%
Natural Law	Gary W. Swing	1,903	0.5%
Write-in	Jason Alessio	106	0.05
Total votes		217,972	100%
Republican hold			

=== 2004 ===
2004 United States House of Representatives elections in Colorado
Party	Candidate	Votes	%
Democratic	John Salazar	153,500	51%
Republican	Greg Walcher	141,376	47%
Unaffiliated	Jim Krug	8,770	2%
Total votes		303,646	100%
Democratic gain from Republican			

=== 2006 ===
2006 United States House of Representatives elections in Colorado
Party	Candidate	Votes	%
Democratic	John Salazar (Incumbent)	146,488	62%
Republican	Scott Tipton	86,930	37%
Libertarian	Bert L. Sargent	4,417	1%
Green	Bruce E. Lohmiller (as a write-in)	23	0%
Total votes		237,858	100%
Democratic hold			

=== 2008 ===
2008 United States House of Representatives elections in Colorado
Party	Candidate	Votes	%
Democratic	John Salazar (Incumbent)	203,457	62%
Republican	Wayne Wolf	126,762	38%
Total votes		330,219	100%
Democratic hold			

=== 2010 ===
2010 United States House of Representatives elections in Colorado
Party	Candidate	Votes	%
Republican	Scott Tipton	129,257	50%
Democratic	John Salazar (Incumbent)	118,048	46%
Libertarian	Gregory Gilman	5,678	2%
Independent	Jake Segrest	4,982	2%
Write-in	John W. Hargis Sr.	23	0.00
Write-in	Jim Fritz	11	0.00
Total votes		257,999	100%
Republican gain from Democratic			

=== 2012 ===
2012 United States House of Representatives elections in Colorado
Party	Candidate	Votes	%
Republican	Scott Tipton (Incumbent)	185,291	53%
Democratic	Sal Pace	142,619	41%
Independent	Tisha Casida	11,125	4%
Libertarian	Gregory Gilman	4,982	2%
Total votes		347,247	100%
Republican hold			

=== 2014 ===
2014 United States House of Representatives elections in Colorado
Party	Candidate	Votes	%
Republican	Scott Tipton (Incumbent)	163,011	58%
Democratic	Abel Tapia	100,364	36%
Independent	Tisha Casida	11,294	4%
Libertarian	Travis Mero	6,472	2%
Total votes		281,143	100%
Republican hold			

=== 2016 ===
2016 United States House of Representatives elections in Colorado
Party	Candidate	Votes	%
Republican	Scott Tipton (Incumbent)	204,220	54.60%
Democratic	Gail Schwartz	150,914	40.35%
Libertarian	Gaylon Kent	18,903	5.05%
Total votes		374,037	100%
Republican hold			

=== 2018 ===
2018 United States House of Representatives elections in Colorado
Party	Candidate	Votes	%
Republican	Scott Tipton (Incumbent)	173,205	51.52%
Democratic	Diane Mitsch Bush	146,426	43.55%
Independent	Mary Malarsie	10,831	3.22%
Libertarian	Gaylon Kent	5,727	1.71%
Total votes		336,189	100%
Republican hold			

=== 2020 ===
2020 United States House of Representatives elections in Colorado
Party	Candidate	Votes	%
Republican	Lauren Boebert	215,279	51.27%
Democratic	Diane Mitsch Bush	190,695	45.41%
Libertarian	John Keil	9,841	2.34%
Unity	Critter Milton	4,104	0.98%
Total votes		419,919	100%
Republican hold			

=== 2022 ===
2022 United States House of Representatives elections in Colorado
Party	Candidate	Votes	%
Republican	Lauren Boebert (incumbent)	163,839	50.08%
Democratic	Adam Frisch	163,293	49.92%
Total votes		327,132	100%
Republican hold			

=== 2024 ===
2024 United States House of Representatives elections in Colorado
Party	Candidate	Votes	%
Republican	Jeff Hurd	201,951	50.80%
Democratic	Adam Frisch	182,147	45.82%
Libertarian	James Wiley	10,734	2.70%
Unity	Adam Withrow	2,721	0.68%
Total votes		397,553	100%
Republican hold			

== Historical district boundaries ==
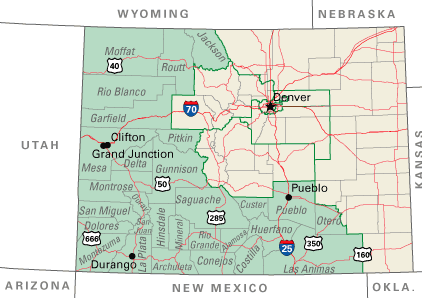
2003–2013

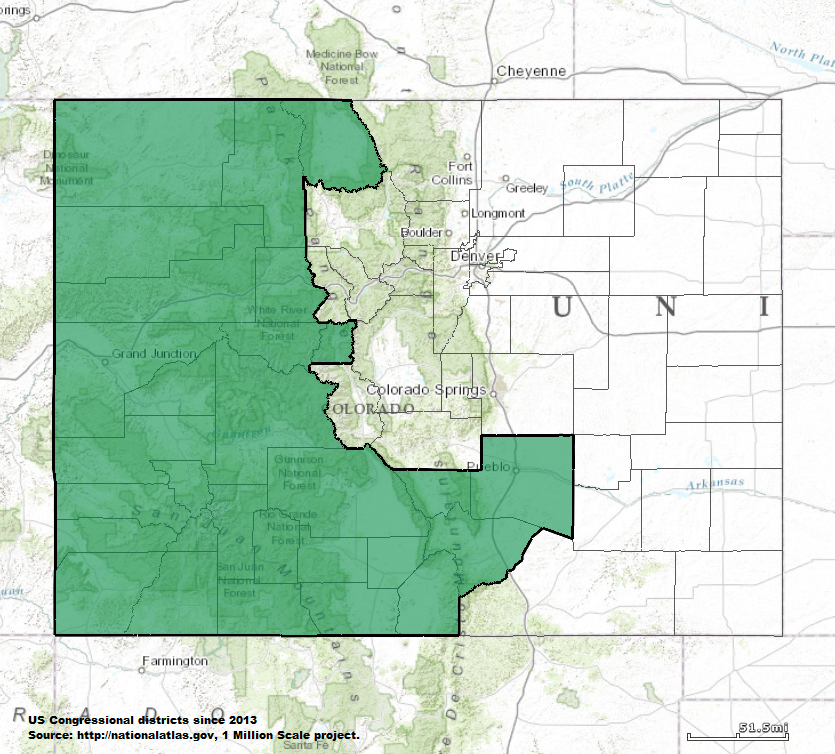
2013–2023

== See also ==
- Colorado's congressional districts
- List of United States congressional districts
