= John Chenoweth (Colorado politician) =

American politician (1897–1986)

John E. Chenoweth
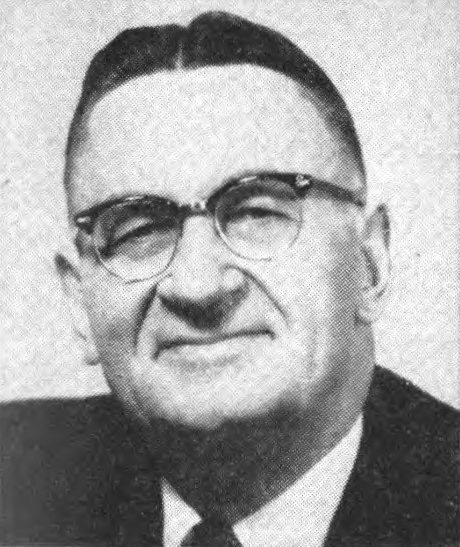
- J. Edgar Chenoweth from 1963's Pocket Congressional Directory of the Eighty-Eighth Congress

Member of the U.S. House of Representatives from Colorado's 3rd district
- In office January 3, 1951 – January 3, 1965
- Preceded by: John Henry Marsalis
- Succeeded by: Frank Evans
- In office January 3, 1941 – January 3, 1949
- Preceded by: William E. Burney
- Succeeded by: John Henry Marsalis

Personal details
- Born: John Edgar Chenoweth; August 17, 1897 Trinidad, Colorado, U.S.
- Died: January 2, 1986 (aged 88) Trinidad, Colorado, U.S.
- Party: Republican
- Children: 5
- Education: University of Colorado Boulder
- Occupation: Attorney, judge

John Edgar Chenoweth (August 17, 1897 – January 2, 1986) was a Republican politician from the U.S. state of Colorado, serving as a member of the United States House of Representatives and as a state judge.

== Early life ==
Chenoweth's parents were Thomas Beaseman Chenoweth and Esther Rebecca Chenoweth (née Shamberger). Chenoweth was born in Trinidad, Colorado, and attended the University of Colorado at Boulder. From 1916–1925, he worked on railroads and as a trader. In 1925, he was admitted to the bar and began to practice as a lawyer.

=== Personal life ===
He married Ruth Olivia Crews on December 25, 1919. The couple had five children.

== Career ==
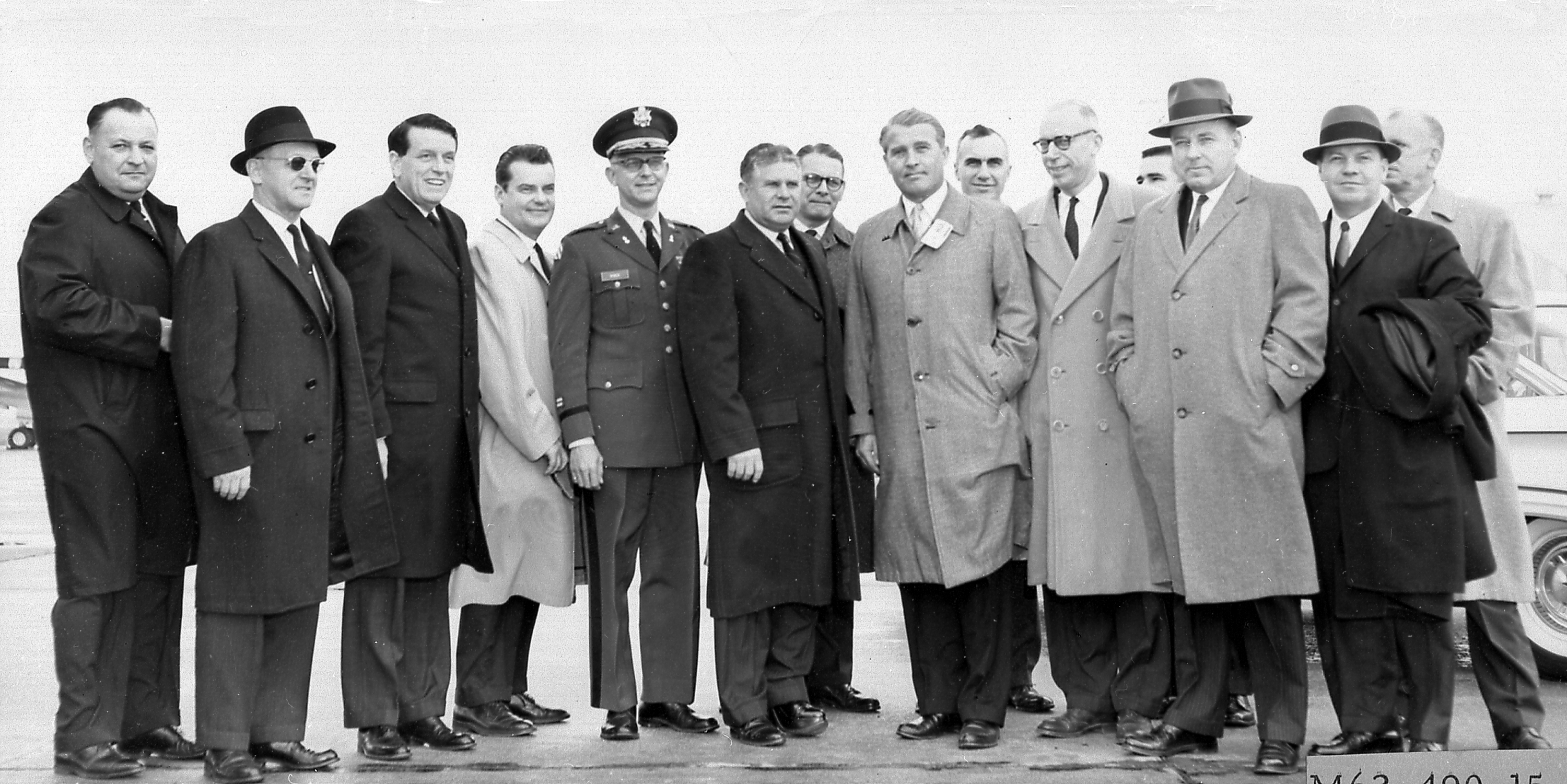
Representative Chenoweth and other members of the House Committee on Science and Astronautics visit the Marshall Space Flight Center on March 9, 1962 to gather first-hand information of the nation's space exploration program.

From 1929-33, he served as assistant district attorney; following this, he worked as a county judge for Las Animas County, serving until 1941. In 1940, he was elected as a Republican to the U.S. House, and he was re-elected three times, serving until he was defeated in the 1948 election.

In 1950, however, he won back his old seat, and served there until he was again defeated in the 1964 elections.

During his tenure, Chenoweth voted in favor of the Civil Rights Acts of 1957, 1960, and 1964, as well as the 24th Amendment to the U.S. Constitution.

== Later career and death ==
After leaving Congress, he returned to Trinidad, Colorado, and once again took up law. He lived there until his death.

== Electoral history ==
John Chenoweth electoral history

1940 Colorado's 3rd congressional district special election
Party	Candidate	Votes	%
Democratic	William E. Burney	68,225	51%
Republican	Henry Leonard	65,675	49%
Total votes		133,900	100%
Democratic hold			

1940 United States House of Representatives elections
Party	Candidate	Votes	%
Republican	John Chenoweth	70,842	52%
Democratic	Byron G. Rogers	65,269	48%
Total votes		136,111	100%
Republican gain from Democratic			

1942 United States House of Representatives elections
Party	Candidate	Votes	%
Republican	John Chenoweth (Incumbent)	55,838	63%
Democratic	J.C. Jarrett	33,154	37%
Total votes		88,992	100%
Republican hold			

1944 United States House of Representatives elections
Party	Candidate	Votes	%
Republican	John Chenoweth (Incumbent)	69,492	56%
Democratic	Arthur M. Wimmell	53,904	44%
Total votes		123,396	100%
Republican hold			

1946 United States House of Representatives elections
Party	Candidate	Votes	%
Republican	John Chenoweth (Incumbent)	45,043	55%
Democratic	Walter Walford Johnson	37,496	45%
Total votes		82,539	100%
Republican hold			

1948 United States House of Representatives elections
Party	Candidate	Votes	%
Democratic	John H. Marsalis	65,114	51%
Republican	John Chenoweth (Incumbent)	63,312	49%
Total votes		128,426	100%
Democratic gain from Republican			

1950 United States House of Representatives elections
Party	Candidate	Votes	%
Republican	John Chenoweth	58,831	52%
Democratic	John H. Marsalis (Incumbent)	55,110	48%
Total votes		113,941	100%
Republican gain from Democratic			

1952 United States House of Representatives elections
Party	Candidate	Votes	%
Republican	John Chenoweth (Incumbent)	84,739	58%
Democratic	John H. Marsalis	62,025	42%
Total votes		146,764	100%
Republican hold			

1954 United States House of Representatives elections
Party	Candidate	Votes	%
Republican	John Chenoweth (Incumbent)	62,884	53%
Democratic	Alva B. Adams Jr.	55,750	47%
Total votes		118,634	100%
Republican hold			

1956 United States House of Representatives elections
Party	Candidate	Votes	%
Republican	John Chenoweth (Incumbent)	74,196	50%
Democratic	Alva B. Adams Jr.	73,501	50%
Total votes		147,697	100%
Republican hold			

1958 United States House of Representatives elections
Party	Candidate	Votes	%
Republican	John Chenoweth (Incumbent)	63,655	50%
Democratic	Fred M. Betz	63,112	50%
Total votes		126,767	100%
Republican hold			

1960 United States House of Representatives elections
Party	Candidate	Votes	%
Republican	John Chenoweth (Incumbent)	85,825	52%
Democratic	Franklin R. Stewart	79,069	48%
Total votes		164,894	100%
Republican hold			

1962 United States House of Representatives elections
Party	Candidate	Votes	%
Republican	John Chenoweth (Incumbent)	74,848	55%
Democratic	Albert J. Tomsic	62,097	45%
Total votes		136,945	100%
Republican hold			

1964 United States House of Representatives elections
Party	Candidate	Votes	%
Democratic	Frank Evans	85,404	51%
Republican	John Chenoweth (Incumbent)	81,544	49%
Total votes		166,948	100%
Democratic gain from Republican			

U.S. House of Representatives
Preceded by William E. Burney	Member of the U.S. House of Representatives from Colorado's 3rd congressional district 1941–1949	Succeeded by John Henry Marsalis
Preceded by John Henry Marsalis	Member of the U.S. House of Representatives from Colorado's 3rd congressional district 1951–1965	Succeeded by Frank Evans
