= Frank Evans (politician) =

American politician from Colorado

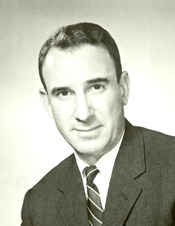

Member of the U.S. House of Representatives from Colorado's 3rd district
- In office January 3, 1965 – January 3, 1979
- Preceded by: John Edgar Chenoweth
- Succeeded by: Ray Kogovsek

Member of the Colorado House of Representatives
- In office 1961–1964

Personal details
- Born: Frank Edward Evans; September 6, 1923 Pueblo, Colorado
- Died: June 3, 2010 (aged 86) Beulah, Colorado
- Party: Democratic
- Education: University of Denver
- Occupation: Attorney

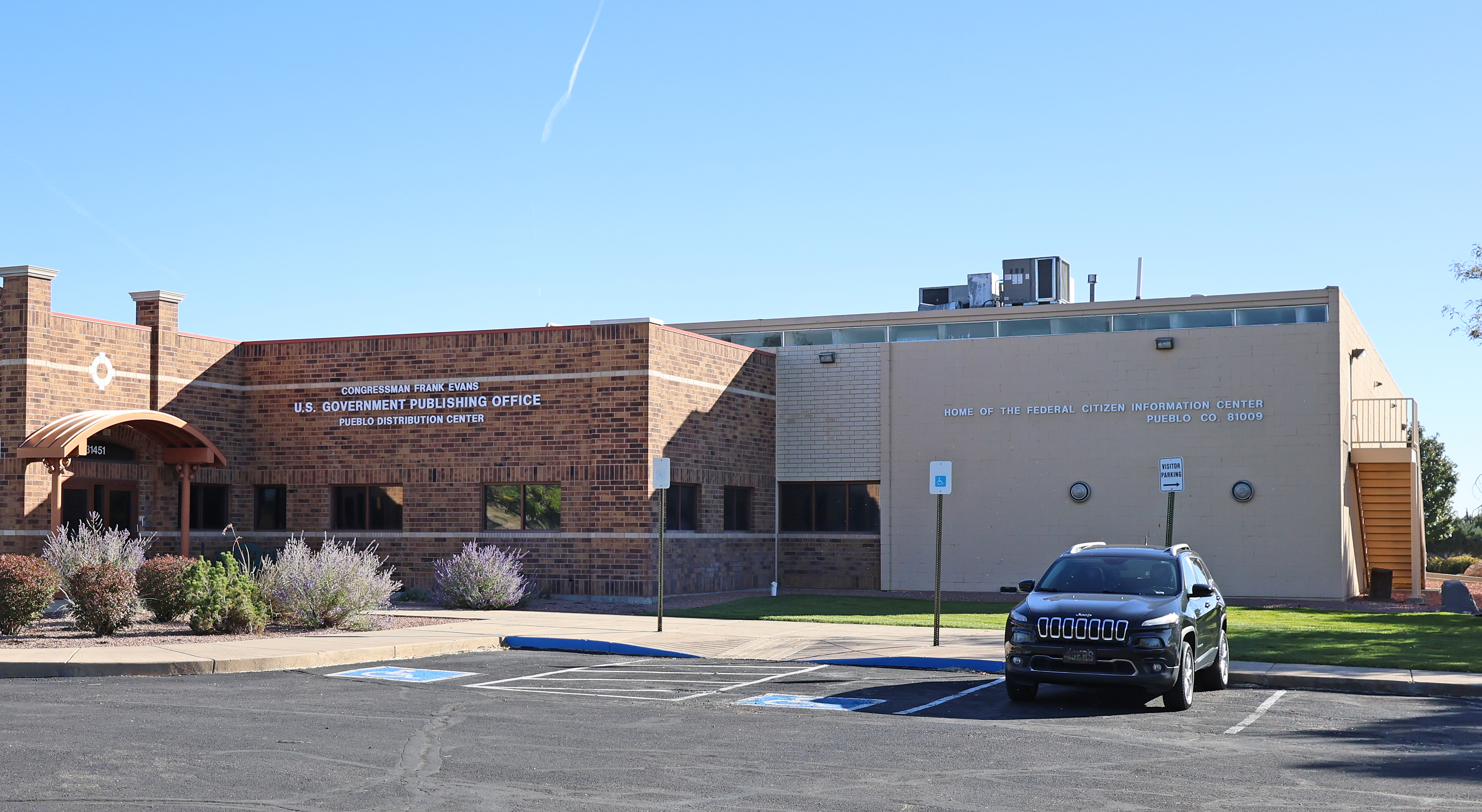
The Frank Evans Government Printing Office Distribution Center in Pueblo, Colorado US

Frank Edward Evans (September 6, 1923 – June 3, 2010) was an American lawyer, politician, and World War II veteran who served seven terms as a U.S. representative from Colorado from 1965 to 1979.

== Early life and education ==
Born in Pueblo, Colorado, Evans attended public schools in Colorado Springs. He entered Pomona College in Claremont, California, in 1941.

=== World War II and early career ===
During World War II, he interrupted his education in 1943 to serve in the United States Navy as a patrol pilot from 1943 to 1946.

He attended the University of Denver for his B.A. (acquired in 1948) and his law degree, LL.B., which he received in 1950. He was admitted to the bar in 1950 and began the practice of law in Pueblo.

=== State house ===
He served as member of the Colorado House of Representatives from 1961 to 1964.

== U.S. House ==
Evans was elected as a Democrat to the Eighty-ninth and to the six succeeding Congresses (January 3, 1965 – January 3, 1979). He was not a candidate for reelection in 1978 to the Ninety-sixth Congress.

== Legacy ==
Until his death he was a resident of Beulah, Colorado.

In 1970, he was instrumental in having the Federal Citizen Information Center established in Pueblo. After Evans' death in 2010, President Barack Obama signed a law renaming the building the "Congressman Frank Evans Government Printing Office Distribution Center." It is also known as the Frank Evans Government Printing Office Building.

== Electoral history ==
1964 United States House of Representatives elections
Party	Candidate	Votes	%
Democratic	Frank Evans	85,404	51%
Republican	John Chenoweth (Incumbent)	81,544	49%
Total votes		166,948	100%
Democratic gain from Republican			

1966 United States House of Representatives elections
Party	Candidate	Votes	%
Democratic	Frank Evans (Incumbent)	76,270	52%
Republican	David W. Enoch	71,213	48%
Total votes		147,483	100%
Democratic hold			

1968 United States House of Representatives elections
Party	Candidate	Votes	%
Democratic	Frank Evans (Incumbent)	88,368	52%
Republican	Paul Bradley	81,163	48%
Total votes		169,531	100%
Democratic hold			

1970 United States House of Representatives elections
Party	Candidate	Votes	%
Democratic	Frank Evans (Incumbent)	87,000	64%
Republican	John "Jack" Mitchell Jr.	45,610	33%
Raza Unida	Martin P. Serna	1,828	1%
Peace Independent	Walter Cranson	1,598	1%
American Independent	Henry John Olshaw	652	1%
Total votes		136,688	100%
Democratic hold			

1972 United States House of Representatives elections
Party	Candidate	Votes	%
Democratic	Frank Evans (Incumbent)	107,511	66%
Republican	Chuck Brady	54,556	34%
Total votes		162,067	100%
Democratic hold			

1974 United States House of Representatives elections
Party	Candidate	Votes	%
Democratic	Frank Evans (Incumbent)	91,783	68%
Republican	E. Keith Records	43,298	32%
Total votes		135,081	100%
Democratic hold			

1976 United States House of Representatives elections
Party	Candidate	Votes	%
Democratic	Frank Evans (Incumbent)	89,302	51%
Republican	Melvin Takaki	82,315	47%
Raza Unida	Alfredo Archer	2,429	1%
American Independent	Henry John Olshaw	1,186	1%
Total votes		175,232	100%
Democratic hold			

U.S. House of Representatives
Preceded by John Edgar Chenoweth	Member of the U.S. House of Representatives from Colorado's 3rd congressional district 1965–1979	Succeeded by Ray Kogovsek
