= John Andrew Martin =

American politician

John A. Martin
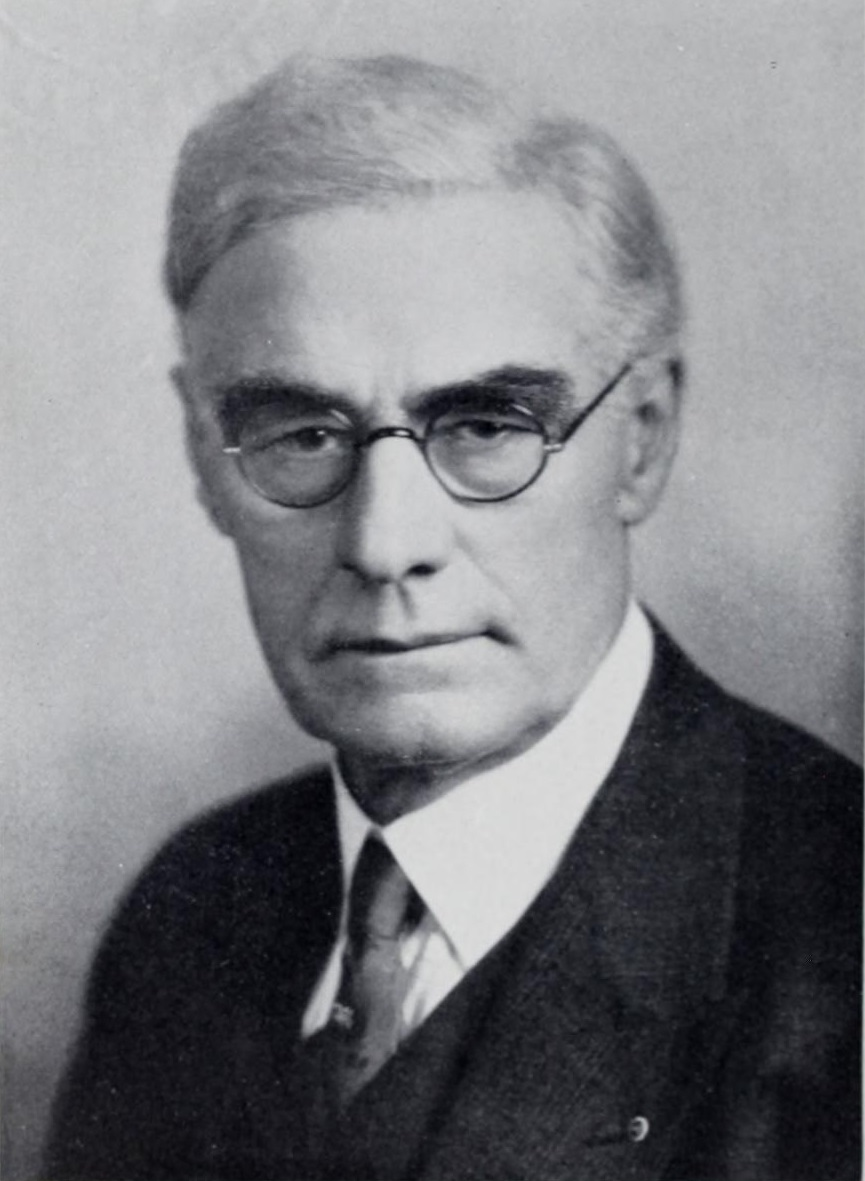

Member of the U.S. House of Representatives from Colorado's 2nd district
- In office March 4, 1909 – March 4, 1913
- Preceded by: Warren A. Haggott
- Succeeded by: Harry H. Seldomridge

Member of the U.S. House of Representatives from Colorado's 3rd district
- In office March 4, 1933 – December 23, 1939
- Preceded by: Guy U. Hardy
- Succeeded by: William E. Burney

Personal details
- Born: John Andrew Martin; April 10, 1868 Cincinnati, Ohio
- Died: December 23, 1939 (aged 71) Washington, D.C.
- Resting place: Mountain View Cemetery, Pueblo, Colorado
- Party: Democratic

John Andrew Martin (April 10, 1868 – December 23, 1939) was an American journalist, attorney, soldier, and politician, who represented Colorado in the U.S. House of Representatives for two terms from 1909 to 1913, then three more terms from 1933 to 1939.

He recruited troops and commanded the 115th Supply Train, Fortieth Division during World War I.

== Early life and education ==
He was born in Cincinnati, Ohio, a son of Hugh and Ann (Bohan) Martin. He acquired a public school education in the towns of Mexico and Fulton, Missouri, until he was twelve years old and began working in a tobacco factory. He moved with his parents to Kansas in 1884 and worked on a farm in Turon.

== Career ==
He came to Colorado in 1887. He was employed on railroad construction work and as a locomotive fireman from 1887 to 1894; He worked on the construction of the Colorado Midland Railroad and then as a locomotive engineer on the Santa Fe. He became publisher of the La Junta Times and was member of the city council of La Junta in 1895 and 1896. He studied law and was admitted to the bar in 1896. In 1897, he began practicing law in Pueblo.

=== First stint in Congress ===
He was a member of the State house of representatives in 1901 and 1902. He was the city attorney in 1905 and 1906. He was elected as a Democrat to the 61st and 62nd Congresses (March 4, 1909 – March 3, 1913). He declined to be a candidate for reelection in 1912 and resumed the practice of law. In 1914, he challenged incumbent U.S. Senator Charles S. Thomas for the Democratic nomination, but dropped out of the race before the primary election. He was again the city attorney in 1916 and 1917.

=== World War I ===
At the outbreak of the First World War, he was attempted to enlist, but was denied due to his age and he was the head of a family. Undeterred, he recruited a volunteer battalion of National Guardsmen in Pueblo and was commissioned a major over the group of men that he recruited. He commanded the 115th Supply Train, Fortieth Division. After the war, he was a member of the San Isabel Chapter Number 2 of the Disabled American Veterans of the World War. He was also post commander of the Pueblo Post Number 2 of the American Legion.

=== Return to Congress ===
He resumed the practice of law in Pueblo, Colorado. Twenty years after his first service in the House of Representatives, he was elected to the 73rd Congress and to the three succeeding Congresses and served from March 4, 1933, until his death. During that time, he worked on the Railroad Retirement Act of 1935 and the Railroad Unemployment Insurance Act. Among his other efforts, he framed holding company legislation while on the House Interstate and Foreign Commerce Committee.

Step by step, this self-made, self-educated man, rising from humble beginnings, attained honor upon honor until he reached the distinction of become a Member of the House of Representatives.

— Representative Edward T. Taylor, Memorial for John Andrew Martin, House of Representatives

== Personal life ==
On September 6, 1892 or 1902, he married Rose May Chitwood at Wellington, Kansas. They had a daughter, Stella. He wrote a novel based on the lives of his wife's parents who were pioneer settlers in Kansas. Published in 1908, it depicted the "dawn life of the prairie West and its people."

== Death and burial ==
He contacted a case of ptomaine poisoning and died in Washington, D.C., on December 23, 1939. He was buried in Mountain View Cemetery, Pueblo, Colorado.

== Electoral history ==
1932 United States House of Representatives elections
Party	Candidate	Votes	%
Democratic	John Andrew Martin	59,882	51%
Republican	Guy U. Hardy (Incumbent)	57,793	49%
Total votes		117,675	100%
Democratic gain from Republican			

1934 United States House of Representatives elections
Party	Candidate	Votes	%
Democratic	John Andrew Martin (Incumbent)	73,281	64%
Republican	W.O. Peterson	39,753	35%
Socialist	Joseph T. Landis	1,199	1%
Total votes		114,233	100%
Democratic hold			

1936 United States House of Representatives elections
Party	Candidate	Votes	%
Democratic	John Andrew Martin (Incumbent)	74,013	60%
Republican	J. Arthur Phelps	48,871	40%
Total votes		122,884	100%
Democratic hold			

1938 United States House of Representatives elections
Party	Candidate	Votes	%
Democratic	John Andrew Martin (Incumbent)	72,736	57%
Republican	Henry Leonard	54,007	43%
Total votes		126,743	100%
Democratic hold			

== See also ==
- List of members of the United States Congress who died in office (1900–1949)

U.S. House of Representatives
Preceded by Warren A. Haggott	Member of the U.S. House of Representatives from Colorado's 2nd congressional district 1909 – 1913	Succeeded by Harry H. Seldomridge
Preceded by Guy U. Hardy	Member of the U.S. House of Representatives from Colorado's 3rd congressional district 1933 – 1939	Succeeded by William E. Burney
