= Guy U. Hardy =

American politician (1872–1947)

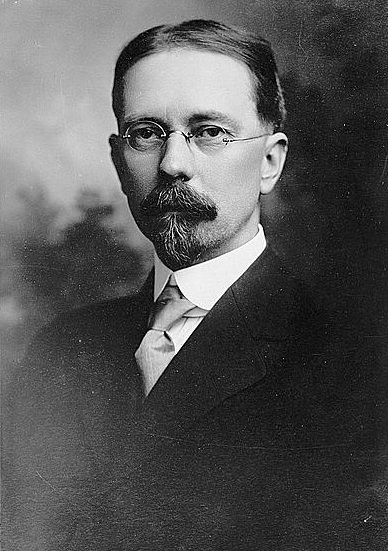

Member of the U.S. House of Representatives from Colorado's 3rd district
- In office March 4, 1919 – March 3, 1933
- Preceded by: Edward Keating
- Succeeded by: John Andrew Martin

Personal details
- Born: April 4, 1872 Abingdon, Illinois, U.S.
- Died: January 26, 1947 (aged 74) Cañon City, Colorado, U.S.
- Resting place: Greenwood Cemetery
- Party: Republican
- Spouse: Jessie Mack (m. 1899)
- Children: 4
- Education: Transylvania University
- Committees: Appropriations

Guy Urban Hardy (April 4, 1872 – January 26, 1947) was a U.S. representative from Colorado for fourteen years. He was a newspaper editor and publisher for 52 years as well as president of the National Editorial Association. Three parks were established in Cañon City, Colorado as the result of his lobbying efforts: Royal Gorge Park, Temple Canyon Park, and Red Canyon Park. The Guy U. Hardy award was established to recognize individuals who preserve, protect, and advocate for outdoor recreational opportunities.

== Early life and education ==
Born in Abingdon, Illinois, Hardy had two brothers. He attended the public schools, Albion Normal College in Albion, Illinois, and Transylvania University, Lexington, Kentucky.

== Career ==
He taught school in Illinois and Florida from 1890 to 1893. He had tuberculosis and moved to Cañon City, Colorado for the dry climate in 1894. He was the editor and later publisher and owner of the Cañon City Daily Record and Cañon City Weekly Record, beginning in 1895. Initially, there was a weekly paper, and by 1906 Hardy also published a daily newspaper. Appointed to the post by President William McKinley, he was postmaster of Cañon City from June 5, 1900, to July 30, 1904. He was president of the National Editorial Association in 1918 and 1919.

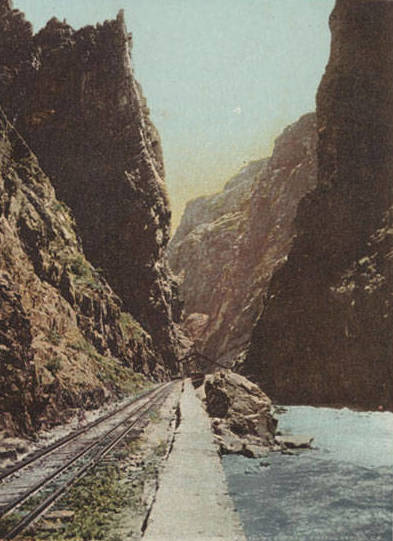
Royal Gorge

He lobbied Congress in 1906 to establish a 8 miles (13 km) park at Royal Gorge by having the land ceded to the City of Cañon City. Royal Gorge Park was created due to his efforts, as were Temple Canyon Park in 1912 and also Red Canyon Park. He was also a leader in the local Chamber of Commerce.

Hardy was elected as a Republican to the 66th Congress and to the six succeeding Congresses (March 4, 1919 – March 3, 1933). He was an unsuccessful candidate for reelection in 1932 to the 73rd Congress. While in Congress, he prepared documents regarding the responsibilities of Congressmen and about Congress.

During the years he served in Congress, he was recognized by his colleagues as a fine gentleman, of excellent character, and high ability. His devotion to his duties as a Representative, and his efforts in behalf of his people, accomplished much for us, and the people of Colorado will always be indebted to him.

— Congressman Robert F. Rockwell

He resumed his former publishing pursuits in Cañon City, Colorado. He founded the University Club of Cañon City.

== Personal life ==
On August 2, 1899, he married Jessie Mack (born May 7, 1875 Cañon City), the daughter of early pioneers of Cañon City, Julia E. (Little) and Henry Mack. Jessie received her Bachelor of Philosophy (Ph.B.) at the University of Michigan in 1898, after which she taught Latin and English at the Cañon City High School. She was a suffragette and involved in a number of community organizations. She also taught kindergarten.

The Hardys had four children, daughter Marion and sons Max, Lyman, and Don. He resided in Cañon City, Colorado until his death on January 26, 1947. He was interred in Greenwood Cemetery. After his death, his son Don ran the newspapers.

The Guy U. Hardy Award for Service to Outdoor Recreation was created in his name to recognize people in the community who "help preserve, protect and advocate for providing outdoor recreation opportunities." Hardy had a significant impact on outdoor recreational opportunities in the Royal Gorge area.

== Electoral history ==
1918 United States House of Representatives elections
Party	Candidate	Votes	%
Republican	Guy U. Hardy	31,715	51%
Democratic	Edward Keating (Incumbent)	29,075	47%
Socialist	Edith Halcomb	1,453	2%
Total votes		62,243	100%
Republican gain from Democratic			

1920 United States House of Representatives elections
Party	Candidate	Votes	%
Republican	Guy U. Hardy (Incumbent)	43,426	58%
Democratic	Samuel J. Burris	31,896	42%
Total votes		75,322	100%
Republican hold			

1922 United States House of Representatives elections
Party	Candidate	Votes	%
Republican	Guy U. Hardy (Incumbent)	43,508	52%
Democratic	Chester B. Horn	39,500	48%
Total votes		83,008	100%
Republican hold			

1924 United States House of Representatives elections
Party	Candidate	Votes	%
Republican	Guy U. Hardy (Incumbent)	53,877	59%
Democratic	Charles B. Hughes	37,976	41%
Total votes		91,853	100%
Republican hold			

1926 United States House of Representatives elections
Party	Candidate	Votes	%
Republican	Guy U. Hardy (Incumbent)	46,916	54%
Democratic	Edmond I. Crockett	40,009	46%
Total votes		86,925	100%
Republican hold			

1928 United States House of Representatives elections
Party	Candidate	Votes	%
Republican	Guy U. Hardy (Incumbent)	64,116	65%
Democratic	Harry A. McIntyre	34,670	35%
Total votes		98,786	100%
Republican hold			

1930 United States House of Representatives elections
Party	Candidate	Votes	%
Republican	Guy U. Hardy (Incumbent)	55,170	61%
Democratic	Guy M. Weybright	35,744	39%
Total votes		90,914	100%
Republican hold			

1932 United States House of Representatives elections
Party	Candidate	Votes	%
Democratic	John Andrew Martin	59,882	51%
Republican	Guy U. Hardy (Incumbent)	57,793	49%
Total votes		117,675	100%
Democratic gain from Republican			

U.S. House of Representatives
Preceded by Edward Keating	Member of the U.S. House of Representatives from Colorado's 3rd congressional district 1919–1933	Succeeded by John Andrew Martin
