= Ray Kogovsek =

American politician (1941–2017)

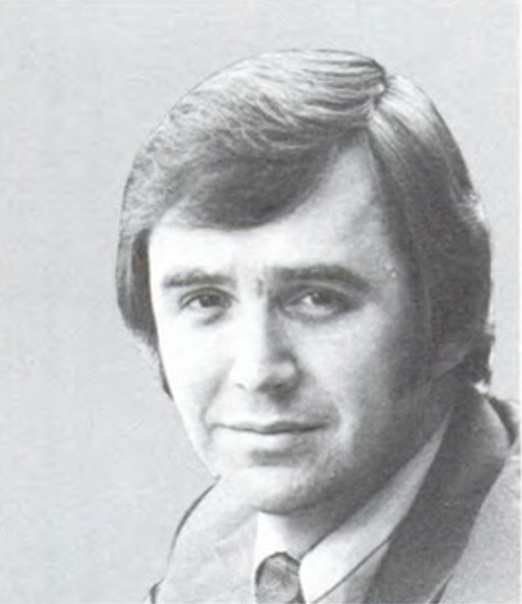

Member of the U.S. House of Representatives from Colorado's 3rd district
- In office January 3, 1979 – January 3, 1985
- Preceded by: Frank Evans
- Succeeded by: Michael L. Strang

Personal details
- Born: Raymond Peter Kogovsek; August 19, 1941 Pueblo, Colorado
- Died: April 30, 2017 (aged 75) Pueblo, Colorado
- Party: Democratic
- Education: Adams State University

Raymond Peter Kogovsek (/kəˈɡoʊsɪk/; August 19, 1941 – April 30, 2017) was an American politician who served as a U.S. representative from Colorado for three terms from 1979 to 1985.

== Early life and education ==
Born in Pueblo, Colorado, Kogovsek graduated from Pueblo Catholic High School, 1959. He attended Pueblo Junior College, Pueblo, Colorado from 1960 to 1962. Kogovsek received his Bachelor of Science degree from Adams State College, Alamosa, Colorado, 1964. He then did graduate work, at University of Denver, 1965.

== Political career ==
He served in the Pueblo County Clerk office from 1964 to 1973. He worked as a paralegal aide from 1974 to 1978.

Kogovsek served in the Colorado House of Representatives from 1969 to 1971. He then served in the Colorado Senate from 1971 to 1978. He served as a delegate, Colorado State Democratic conventions from 1966 to 1979.

=== Congress ===
Kogovsek was elected as a Democrat to the 96th and to the two succeeding Congresses (January 3, 1979 – January 3, 1985). He did not seek reelection to the 99th Congress.

== Retirement and death ==
He was a resident of Pueblo, Colorado until his death on April 30, 2017 at the age of 75.

== Electoral history ==
1978 United States House of Representatives elections
Party	Candidate	Votes	%
Democratic	Raymond P. Kogovsek	69,669	49%
Republican	Harold L. McCormick	69,303	49%
American Independent	Henry John Olshaw	2,475	2%
Total votes		141,447	100%
Democratic hold			

1980 United States House of Representatives elections
Party	Candidate	Votes	%
Democratic	Raymond P. Kogovsek (Incumbent)	105,820	55%
Republican	Harold L. McCormick	84,292	44%
Libertarian	James S. Glennie	2,670	1%
Total votes		192,782	100%
Democratic hold			

1982 United States House of Representatives elections
Party	Candidate	Votes	%
Democratic	Raymond P. Kogovsek (Incumbent)	92,384	53%
Republican	Tom Wiena	77,409	45%
Libertarian	Paul "Stormy" Mohn	2,439	1%
Independent	Henry John Olshaw	656	1%
Total votes		172,888	100%
Democratic hold			

U.S. House of Representatives
Preceded by Frank Evans	Member of the U.S. House of Representatives from Colorado's 3rd congressional district 1979–1985	Succeeded by Michael L. Strang
