= Scott Tipton =

American politician (born 1956)

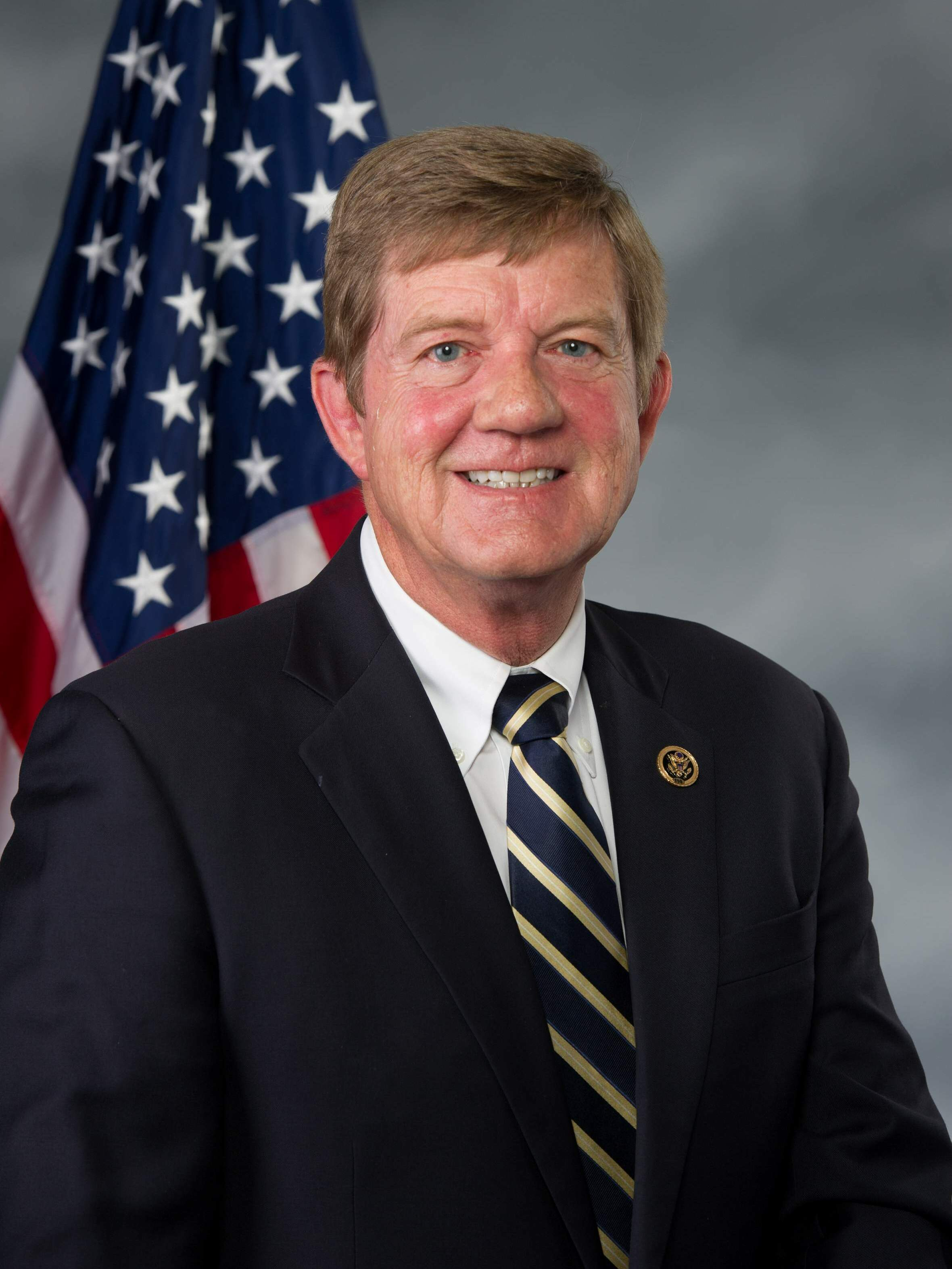
- Official portrait, 2017

Member of the U.S. House of Representatives from Colorado's 3rd district
- In office January 3, 2011 – January 3, 2021
- Preceded by: John Salazar
- Succeeded by: Lauren Boebert

Member of the Colorado House of Representatives from the 59th district
- In office January 9, 2009 – January 2, 2011
- Preceded by: Ray Rose
- Succeeded by: Don Coram

Personal details
- Born: Scott Randall Tipton; November 9, 1956 (age 69) Española, New Mexico, U.S.
- Party: Republican
- Spouse: Jean Tipton
- Children: 3
- Education: Fort Lewis College (BA)

Scott Randall Tipton (born November 9, 1956) is an American politician who served as the U.S. representative for Colorado's 3rd congressional district from 2011 to 2021. A Republican, he was previously a member of the Colorado House of Representatives from 2009 to 2011. Tipton was first elected to the House in November 2010 when he defeated three-term Democratic incumbent John Salazar, and he was re-elected four times. In 2020, he lost renomination to Republican primary challenger Lauren Boebert in what was considered a major upset.

== Early life and education ==
Tipton was born in Española, New Mexico, and raised in Cortez, Colorado. He earned a Bachelor of Arts degree in political science from Fort Lewis College, the first in his family to graduate from college.

== Career ==
After college, Tipton co-founded a pottery company called Mesa Verde Indian Pottery with his brother, based in Cortez, Colorado. The Tiptons sold the company to the Ute Mountain Ute Tribe in 2014.

A lifelong Republican, he became involved in the unsuccessful Reagan presidential campaign of 1976 and was a delegate to the Republican Convention that year. He also assisted with local campaigns for Reagan in 1980 and 1984 across Montezuma County, Colorado and the 3rd Congressional district and was Republican chairman of the 3rd Congressional district for eight years. He was a board member of Mesa Verde National Park, Crow Canyon Archaeological Center, and the advisory board of Pueblo Community College.

In 2011, it was reported that he spent over $7,000 on vendors that did business with his nephew's company. In 2012, he violated House rules when his office used taxpayer resources to promote a campaign event.

A super PAC, funded by oil and gas driller SG Interests, is registered at the address of Tipton's campaign attorney and run by a law clerk in his office. Tipton's attorney said: "I have specifically put up Chinese walls to make sure Charlie (law clerk) is in no way involved with the Tipton campaign, and I'm in no way involved with the Colorado Future Fund."

== Colorado House of Representatives ==
=== 2008 election ===
On February 5, 2008, he announced his candidacy for the Colorado House seat representing District 58. The announcement came shortly after the incumbent, Ray Rose, announced he would retire in 2008. He had no opposition in the Republican primary, but faced Democratic candidate Noelle Hagan in the November 2008 general election. Hagan's candidacy was endorsed by the Denver Post and the Montrose Daily Press. Tipton won the election with 59 percent of the vote.

=== Tenure ===
With Representatives Laura Bradford and Frank McNulty, Tipton planned on re-introducing a version of Jessica's Law to establish minimum sentences for child sex offenders, sponsoring bills to create a full-time judge position in Montrose and to simplify water rights filing. The attempt to introduce a version of Jessica's Law was unsuccessful, it died in committee.

=== Committee assignments ===
For the 2009 legislative session, Tipton was named to seats on the House Agriculture, Livestock, and Natural Resources Committee and the House Local Government Committee.

== U.S. House of Representatives ==
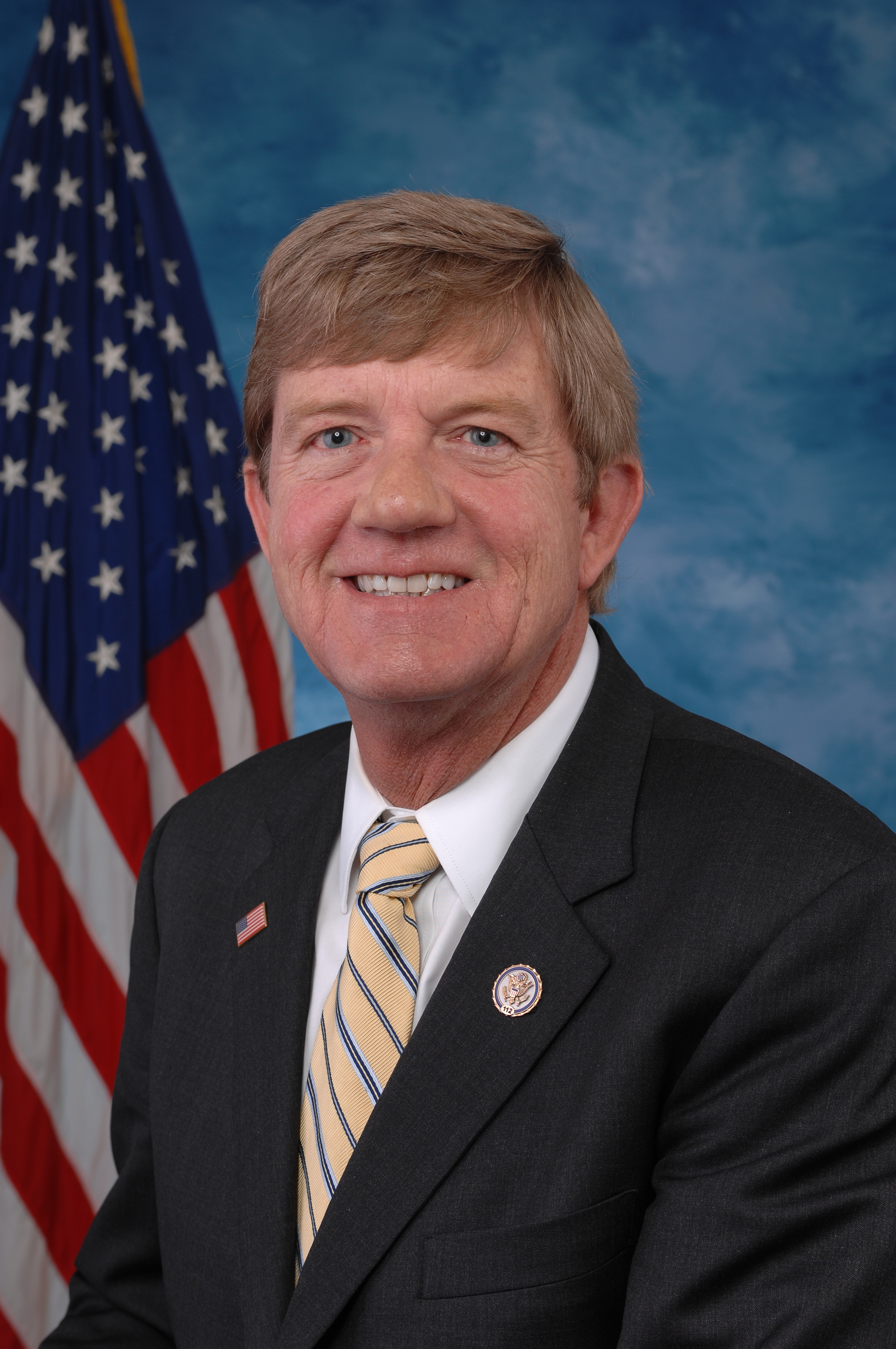
Tipton's 112th Congress session photo

=== Elections ===
==== 2006 ====
He unsuccessfully challenged the first term Democratic U.S. congressman, John Salazar. Tipton lost 38% to 62% to Salazar.

==== 2010 ====
In the Republican primary, he defeated Bob McConnell 56% to 44%. He again challenged Salazar in Colorado's 3rd congressional district. Libertarian Gregory Gilman and independent Jake Segrest were also on the ballot, with independents John W. Hargis, Sr. and James Fritz qualified as write-in candidates. He decided to retire from the Colorado House of Representatives to run for Congress in 2010, again challenging Salazar. In the general election, he defeated Salazar 50.1% to 45.8%.

==== 2012 ====
In 2012, he was challenged by Sal Pace, a Democratic state representative from Pueblo. His re-election campaign was aided by $1.3 million in advertising against Pace, funded by the Grover Norquist led, Americans for Tax Reform. SG Interests, an oil and gas company from Texas, that sought to drill in the Thompson Divide area, also campaigned against Pace. On election night, Tipton defeated Pace and two third party challengers with 53.3% of the vote.

==== 2014 ====
In 2014, he was challenged by Democrat Abel Tapia, Libertarian Travis Mero and UNA candidate Tisha Casida. He won with 56.1% of the vote.

==== 2016 ====
In 2016, Tipton defeated Democratic state senator Gail Schwartz and Libertarian Gaylon Kent, receiving 54.6% of the vote.

==== 2018 ====
In 2018, Tipton held off Democratic former state representative Diane Mitsch Bush, Independent Mary Malarsie, and Libertarian Gaylon Kent in his closest challenge since he was first elected to Congress, receiving 51.2% of the vote.

==== 2020 ====
In what was considered by many media outlets to be a shocking upset, Tipton was defeated in the Republican primary by restaurant owner and gun rights activist Lauren Boebert. He received 45.2% of the vote to Boebert's 54.6%. Dick Wadhams, a Republican political consultant from Denver, says that Tipton had several hundred thousand dollars in the bank for his primary against Boebert, but he chose not to use it for TV/radio ads, mailings, or social media, ceding the debate to Boebert, who inspired a much higher Republican turnout than in 2018. Boebert went on to win in a general election.

=== Tenure ===
Tipton voted in favor of the Tax Cuts and Jobs Act of 2017. According to Tipton, the bill fixes a "broken tax code" and "puts the needs of the American people before special interests." Tipton touts that the act "supports families, graduate students, homeowners, and small businesses," and is "a victory for Coloradans and all Americans."

=== Committee assignments ===
- Committee on Agriculture
  - Subcommittee on Conservation, Energy, and Forestry
- Committee on Natural Resources
  - Subcommittee on National Parks, Forests and Public Lands
  - Subcommittee on Water and Power
- Committee on Small Business
  - Subcommittee on Agriculture, Energy and Trade
  - Subcommittee on Investigations, Oversight and Regulations
- Republican Study Committee

Caucus Memberships

- Congressional Cement Caucus
- Congressional Small Business Caucus
- Congressional Gaming Caucus
- Congressional Ski and Snowboard Caucus
- Congressional Baseball Caucus
- Congressional Western Caucus

== Political positions ==
=== Abortion ===
Tipton opposes abortion.

=== Donald Trump ===
Tipton expressed support for then-candidate Donald Trump in March 2016. After the Donald Trump Access Hollywood tape was released, in which Trump and Billy Bush had a lewd exchange about women, Tipton re-affirmed his support.

On December 18, 2019, Tipton voted against both articles of impeachment against Trump.

=== Economic issues ===
Tipton has said, "we have a problem with reckless spending across the board at the federal level." He has signed Grover Norquist's Taxpayer Protection Pledge, and a pledge sponsored by Americans for Prosperity promising to vote against any Global Warming legislation that would raise taxes. He has also supported the Ryan Plan, having twice voted for it.

In February 2017, he voted against a resolution that would have directed the House to request 10 years of Trump's tax returns, which would then have been reviewed by the House Ways and Means Committee in a closed session.

=== Environment ===
Tipton rejects the scientific consensus on climate change. He argues that climate change is driven by natural climate cycles. He opposes the Paris Agreement, the international agreement which mitigates greenhouse gas emissions.

He opposes federal regulation of greenhouse gas emissions. He has an 8% score by the League of Conservation Voters.

In 2010, while serving in the state legislature, Tipton voted against legislation to compel Xcel Energy to convert three coal power plants to natural gas power plants. He also voted against legislation to require electricity utilities to use more renewable energy.

In 2016, Tipton wrote a draft bill on oil and gas drilling in the Thompson Divide that contained large sections taken "word for word" from a proposal offered by a SG Interests, a Texas-based energy company and its lobbying firm. Tipton's draft legislation (which he described as a "starting point") was criticized because of Tipton's receipt of $39,000 in campaign contributions from SG Interests over the course of his career.

In January 2017, Tipton voted in favor of legislation that would make it easier to sell federal public lands. Tipton was criticized by conservation groups for his vote.

==== Water rights ====
Tipton introduced the Water Rights Protection Act into the House on September 26, 2013. The bill would prevent federal agencies from requiring certain entities to relinquish their water rights to the United States in order to use public lands. Tipton said the bill was needed because it "provides critical protection for water rights' holders from federal takings by ensuring that federal government agencies cannot extort private property rights through uneven-handed negotiations." Tipton argued that the bill "prohibits federal agencies from pilfering water rights through the use of permits, leases, and other land management arrangements, for which it would otherwise have to pay just compensation under the 5th Amendment of the Constitution."

=== Foreign policy ===
He has criticized the Obama administration for inaction in the Middle East: "President Obama and Secretary Clinton's inaction in the Middle East has emboldened Syria, Iran and Russia and led to the death and displacement of millions of Syrian civilians."

=== Healthcare ===
He is in favor of repealing the Affordable Care Act. On May 4, 2017, he voted to repeal the Patient Protection and Affordable Care Act (Obamacare) and pass the American Health Care Act.

=== LGBT rights ===
He opposes same-sex marriage.

=== Immigration and refugees ===
Tipton has said, "I strongly oppose amnesty or any special benefits for illegal immigrants". He criticized President Obama for his executive order allowing up to five million illegal immigrants "to come out of the shadows" and work openly in the country.

Tipton takes a "hardline stance" on the refugees of the Syrian Civil War and opposes the admission of Syrian refugees to the United States. He has clashed with Governor John Hickenlooper about the resettlement of refugee families in Colorado.

== Personal life ==
Tipton and his wife, Jean, have two daughters and three grandchildren.

== Electoral history ==
2010 Colorado's 3rd congressional district election
Party	Candidate	Votes	%
Republican	Scott Tipton	129,257	50%
Democratic	John Salazar (Incumbent)	118,048	46%
Libertarian	Gregory Gilman	5,678	2%
Independent	Jake Segrest	4,982	2%
Write-in	John W. Hargis Sr.	23	0.00
Write-in	Jim Fritz	11	0.00
Total votes		257,999	100%
Republican gain from Democratic			

2012 Colorado's 3rd congressional district election
Party	Candidate	Votes	%
Republican	Scott Tipton (Incumbent)	185,291	53%
Democratic	Sal Pace	142,619	41%
Independent	Tisha Casida	11,125	4%
Libertarian	Gregory Gilman	4,982	2%
Total votes		347,247	100%
Republican hold			

2014 Colorado's 3rd congressional district election
Party	Candidate	Votes	%
Republican	Scott Tipton (Incumbent)	163,011	58%
Democratic	Abel Tapia	100,364	36%
Independent	Tisha Casida	11,294	4%
Libertarian	Travis Mero	6,472	2%
Total votes		281,143	100%
Republican hold			

2016 Colorado's 3rd congressional district election
Party	Candidate	Votes	%
Republican	Scott Tipton (Incumbent)	204,220	54.60%
Democratic	Gail Schwartz	150,914	40.35%
Libertarian	Gaylon Kent	18,903	5.05%
Total votes		374,037	100%
Republican hold			

2018 Colorado's 3rd congressional district election
Party	Candidate	Votes	%
Republican	Scott Tipton (Incumbent)	173,205	51.52%
Democratic	Diane Mitsch Bush	146,426	43.55%
Independent	Mary Malarsie	10,831	3.22%
Libertarian	Gaylon Kent	5,727	1.71%
Total votes		336,189	100%
Republican hold			

2020 Colorado's 3rd congressional district Republican primary election
Party	Candidate	Votes	%
Republican	Lauren Boebert	58,678	54.6
Republican	Scott Tipton (incumbent)	48,805	45.4
Total votes		107,483	100.0

U.S. House of Representatives
Preceded by John Salazar	Member of the U.S. House of Representatives from Colorado's 3rd congressional district 2011–2021	Succeeded by Lauren Boebert
U.S. order of precedence (ceremonial)
Preceded by Mike Coffman as Former U.S. Representative	Order of precedence of the United States as Former U.S. Representative	Succeeded by Rod Chandler as Former U.S. Representative
