= 2020 United States House of Representatives elections in Colorado =

- November 3, 2020

All 7 Colorado seats to the United States House of Representatives
	Majority party	Minority party
Party	Democratic	Republican
Last election	4	3
Seats won	4	3
Seat change	Steady	Steady
Popular vote	1,679,052	1,378,248
Percentage	53.05%	43.55%
Swing	▼0.39%	▲0.59%

Democratic
40–50%
50–60%
60–70%
70–80%
Republican
40–50%
50–60%
60–70%
70–80%
80–90%

The 2020 United States House of Representatives elections in Colorado were held on November 3, 2020, to elect the seven U.S. representatives from the state of Colorado, one from each of the state's seven congressional districts. The elections coincided with the 2020 U.S. presidential election, as well as other elections to the House of Representatives, elections to the United States Senate and various state and local elections.

== Overview ==
=== Statewide ===
Party	Candidates	Votes		Seats		
Party	Candidates	No.	%	No.	+/–	%
Democratic	7	1,679,052	53.05	4	Steady	57.14
Republican	7	1,378,248	43.55	3	Steady	42.95
Libertarian	7	79,100	2.50	0	Steady	0.0
Unity	7	23,401	0.74	0	Steady	0.0
Independent	1	3,708	0.12	0	Steady	0.0
Approval Voting	1	1,441	0.05	0	Steady	0.0
Total	30	3,164,950	100.0	7	Steady	100.0

Popular vote
Democratic	53.05%
Republican	43.55%
Libertarian	2.50%
Other	0.90%

House seats
Democratic	57.14%
Republican	42.86%
Libertarian	0.00%
Other	0.00%

=== By district ===
Results of the 2020 United States House of Representatives elections in Colorado by district:

District	Democratic		Republican		Others		Total		Result
District	Votes	%	Votes	%	Votes	%	Votes	%	Result
District 1	331,621	73.65%	105,955	23.53%	12,714	2.82%	450,290	100.0%	Democratic hold
District 2	316,925	61.46%	182,547	35.40%	16,191	3.14%	515,663	100.0%	Democratic hold
District 3	194,122	45.22%	220,634	51.39%	14,553	3.39%	429,319	100.0%	Republican hold
District 4	173,945	36.61%	285,606	60.11%	15,556	3.28%	475,107	100.0%	Republican hold
District 5	161,600	37.37%	249,013	57.59%	21,794	5.04%	432,407	100.0%	Republican hold
District 6	250,314	57.09%	175,192	39.96%	12,967	2.95%	438,473	100.0%	Democratic hold
District 7	250,525	59.13%	159,301	35.60%	13,865	5.27%	423,691	100.0%	Democratic hold
Total	1,679,052	53.05%	1,378,248	43.55%	107,640	3.40%	3,164,950	100.0%	

== District 1 ==
2020 Colorado's 1st congressional district election
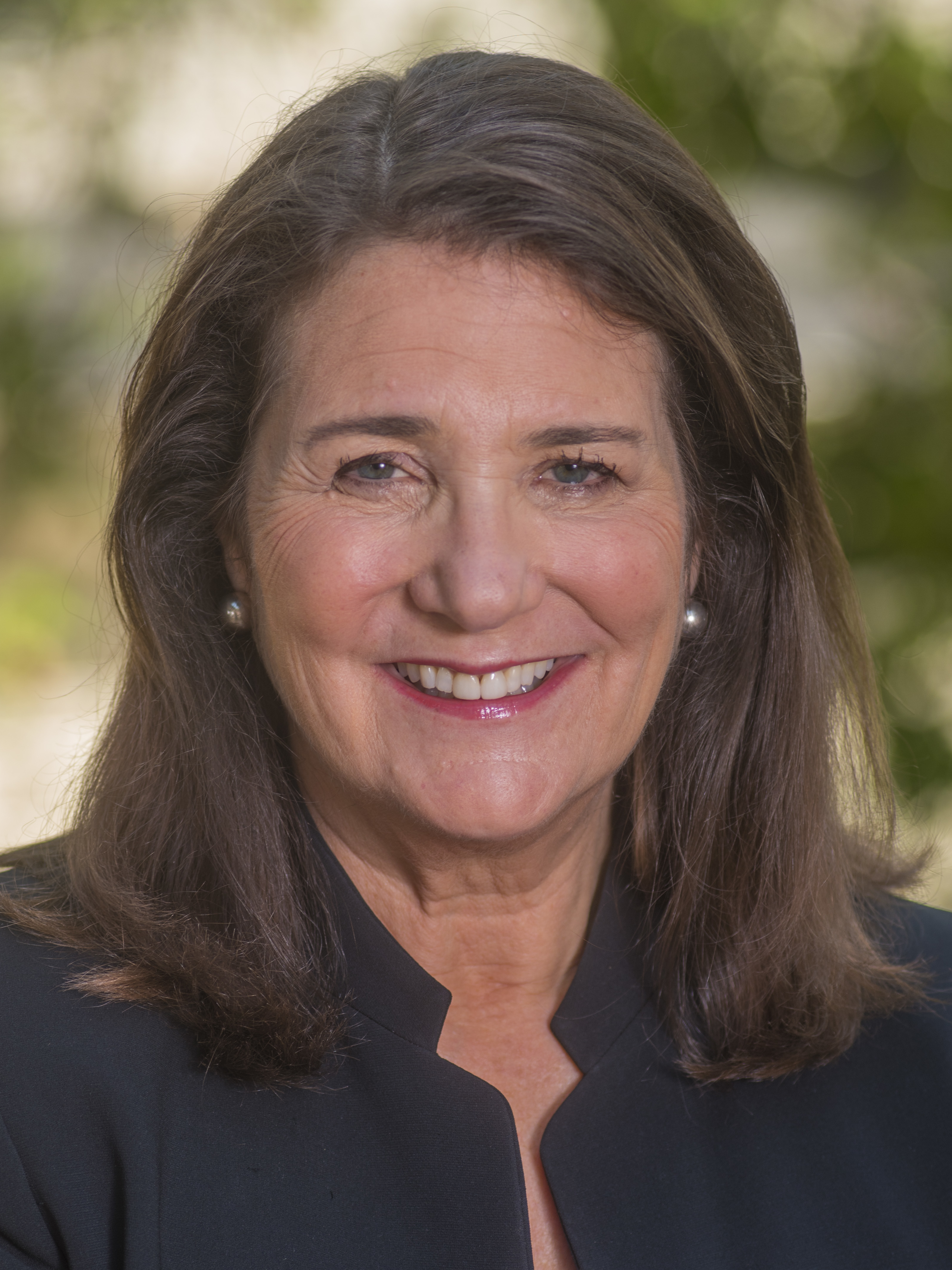

Nominee	Diana DeGette	Shane Bolling
Party	Democratic	Republican
Popular vote	331,621	105,955
Percentage	73.6%	23.5%
- DeGette: 40–50% 50–60% 60–70% 70–80% 80–90% >90% Bolling: 50–60% 60–70% 70–80% No data
U.S. Representatives before election
Diana DeGette
Democratic
Elected U.S. Representatives
Diana DeGette
Democratic

The 1st district includes all of Denver, as well as the neighboring suburbs of Glendale, Englewood, Sheridan, and Cherry Hills Village. The incumbent was Democrat Diana DeGette, who was re-elected with 73.8% of the vote in 2018.

=== Democratic primary ===
==== Candidates ====
===== Declared =====
- Diana DeGette, incumbent U.S. representative

===== Did not qualify =====
- Meghan Pratschler, former candidate for Ohio's 1st congressional district in 2020
- Gabrielle Watson
- Charlie Madison Winters, activist

===== Withdrawn =====
- Crisanta Duran, former speaker of the Colorado House of Representatives

===== Declined =====
- Candi CdeBaca, Denver city councilwoman

==== Endorsements ====
Diana Degette

Organizationa

- J Street PAC
- Planned Parenthood Action Fund
- Sierra Club
Crisanta Duran (withdrawn)

Federal politicians

- Federico Peña, former United States Secretary of Energy, former United States Secretary of Transportation and former mayor of Denver
- Ken Salazar, former United States Secretary of the Interior and former U.S. Senator from Colorado

Local and statewide politicians

- Barbara O'Brien, vice president of the Denver Board of Education and former lieutenant governor of Colorado

==== Primary results ====
Democratic primary results
Party	Candidate	Votes	%
Democratic	Diana DeGette (incumbent)	187,341	100.0
Total votes		187,341	100.0

=== Republican primary ===
==== Declared ====
- Shane Bolling

==== Primary results ====
Republican primary results
Party	Candidate	Votes	%
Republican	Shane Bolling	32,176	100.0
Total votes		32,176	100.0

=== General election ===
==== Predictions ====
Source	Ranking	As of
The Cook Political Report	Safe D	July 2, 2020
Inside Elections	Safe D	June 2, 2020
Sabato's Crystal Ball	Safe D	July 2, 2020
Politico	Safe D	April 19, 2020
Daily Kos	Safe D	June 3, 2020
RCP	Safe D	June 9, 2020
Niskanen	Safe D	June 7, 2020

==== Results ====
Colorado's 1st congressional district, 2020
Party	Candidate	Votes	%
Democratic	Diana DeGette (incumbent)	331,621	73.6
Republican	Shane Bolling	105,955	23.5
Libertarian	Kyle Furey	8,749	1.9
Unity	Paul Noel Fiorino	2,524	0.6
Approval Voting	Jan Kok	1,441	0.3
Total votes		450,290	100.0
Democratic hold			

== District 2 ==
2020 Colorado's 2nd congressional district election
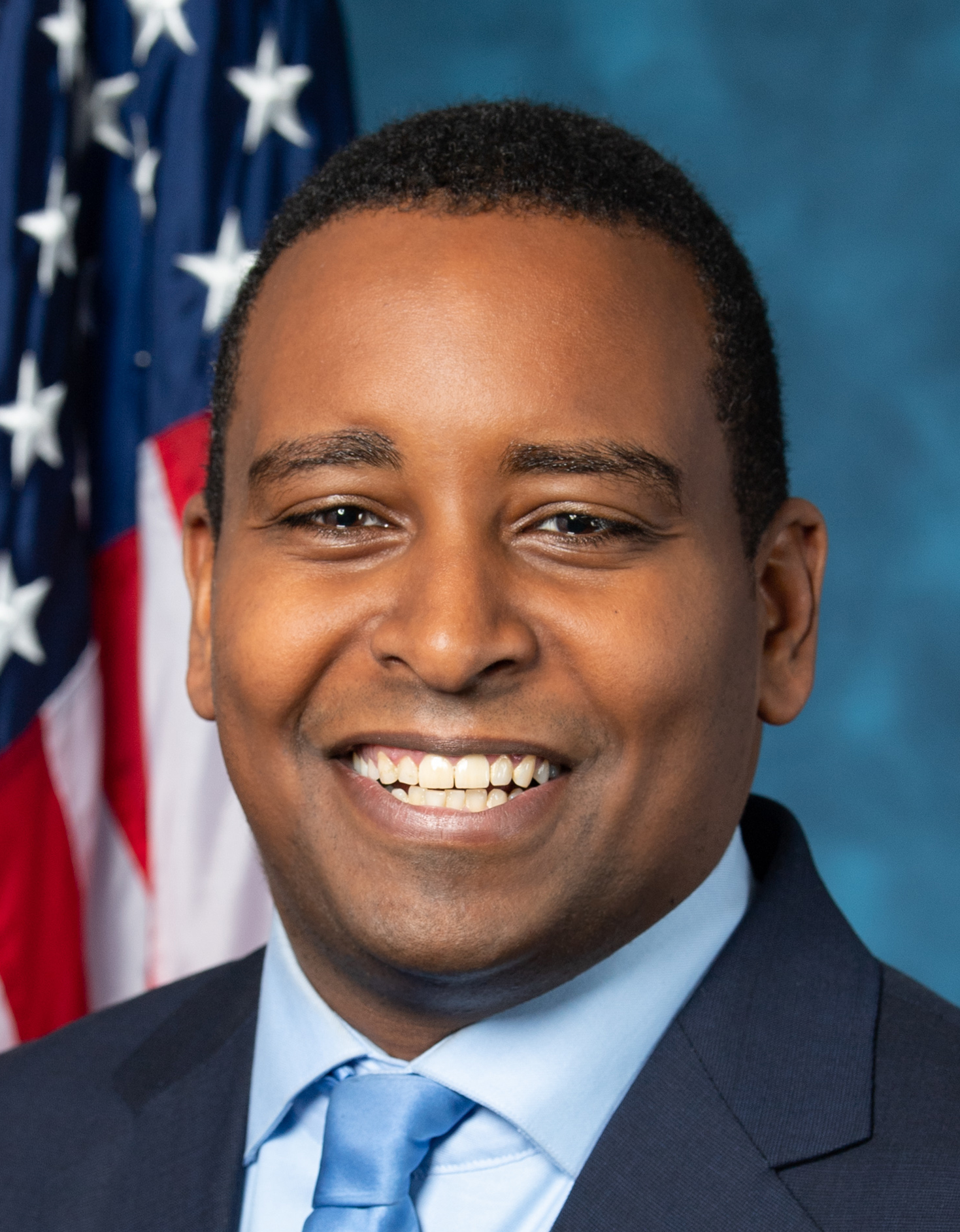

Nominee	Joe Neguse	Charles Winn
Party	Democratic	Republican
Popular vote	316,925	182,547
Percentage	61.5%	35.4%
- Neguse: 40–50% 50–60% 60–70% 70–80% 80–90% >90% Winn: 40–50% 50–60% 60–70% 70–80% No data
U.S. Representatives before election
Joe Neguse
Democratic
Elected U.S. Representatives
Joe Neguse
Democratic

The 2nd district is located in north-central Colorado, taking in Boulder, Fort Collins, Loveland, as well as the surrounding mountain ski towns, including Vail, Grand Lake and Idaho Springs. The incumbent was Democrat Joe Neguse, who was elected with 60.3% of the vote in 2018.

=== Democratic primary ===
==== Candidates ====
===== Declared =====
- Joe Neguse, incumbent U.S. representative

==== Endorsements ====
Joe Neguse

Organizations

- Democracy for America
- League of Conservation Voters Action Fund
- Sierra Club

==== Primary results ====
Democratic primary results
Party	Candidate	Votes	%
Democratic	Joe Neguse (incumbent)	168,393	100.0
Total votes		168,393	100.0

=== Republican primary ===
==== Declared ====
- Charles Winn, former U.S. Navy flight surgeon

==== Primary results ====
Republican primary results
Party	Candidate	Votes	%
Republican	Charles Winn	66,297	100.0
Total votes		66,297	100.0

=== General election ===
==== Predictions ====
Source	Ranking	As of
The Cook Political Report	Safe D	July 2, 2020
Inside Elections	Safe D	June 2, 2020
Sabato's Crystal Ball	Safe D	July 2, 2020
Politico	Safe D	April 19, 2020
Daily Kos	Safe D	June 3, 2020
RCP	Safe D	June 9, 2020
Niskanen	Safe D	June 7, 2020

==== Results ====
Colorado's 2nd congressional district, 2020
Party	Candidate	Votes	%
Democratic	Joe Neguse (incumbent)	316,925	61.5
Republican	Charles Winn	182,547	35.4
Libertarian	Thom Atkinson	13,657	2.6
Unity	Gary Swing	2,534	0.5
Total votes		515,663	100.0
Democratic hold			

== District 3 ==
2020 Colorado's 3rd congressional district election
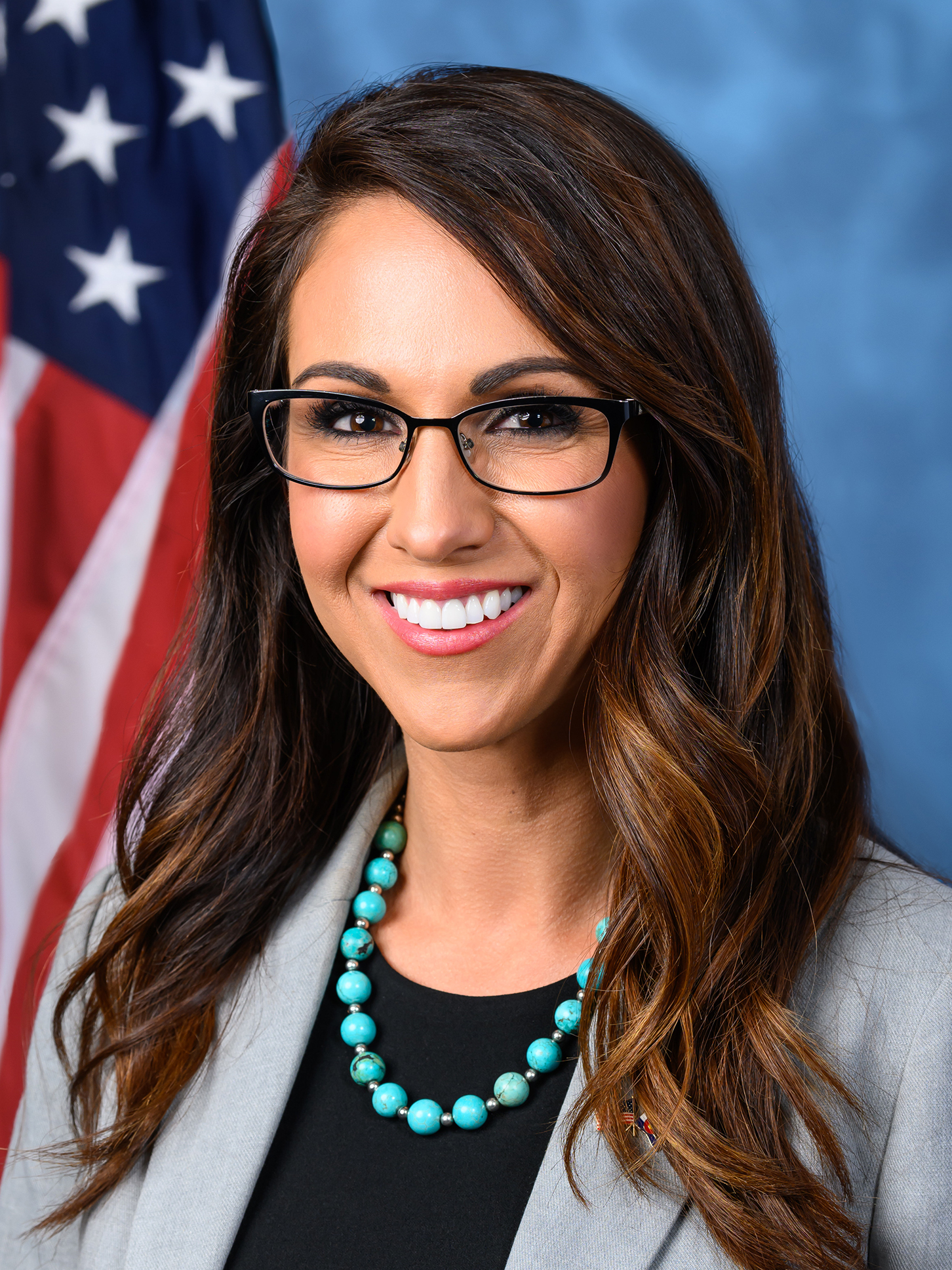

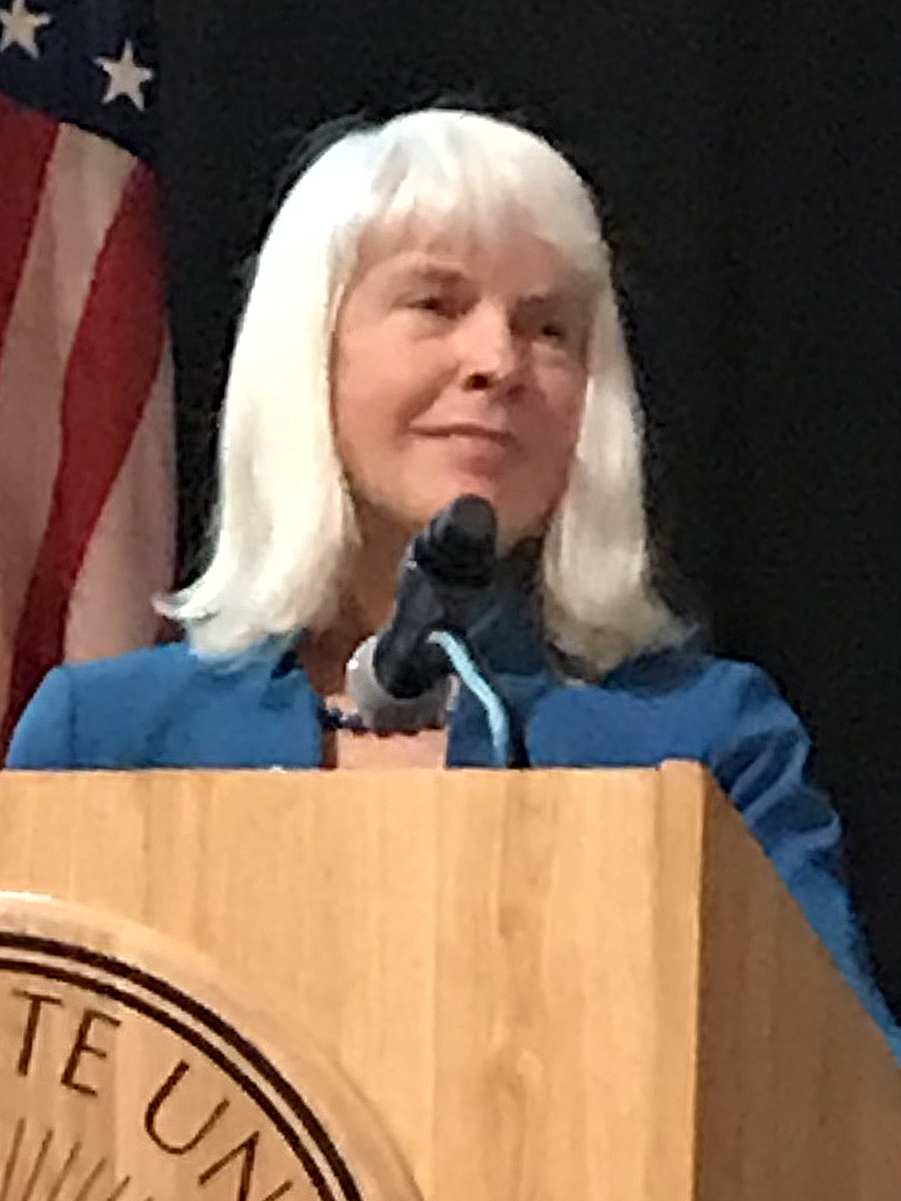
Nominee	Lauren Boebert	Diane Mitsch Bush
Party	Republican	Democratic
Popular vote	220,634	194,122
Percentage	51.4%	45.2%
- Boebert: 40–50% 50–60% 60–70% 70–80% 80–90% >90% Bush: 40–50% 50–60% 60–70% 70–80% 80–90%
U.S. Representatives before election
Scott Tipton
Republican
Elected U.S. Representatives
Lauren Boebert
Republican

The 3rd district encompasses the Colorado Western Slope, including the cities of Aspen, Pueblo, and Grand Junction. The incumbent was Republican Scott Tipton, who was re-elected with 51.5% of the vote in 2018. According to The Cook Political Report, the 3rd district had a Partisan Voting Index of R+6.

=== Republican primary ===
==== Candidates ====
===== Nominee =====
- Lauren Boebert, restaurant owner and pro-gun activist

===== Eliminated in primary =====
- Scott Tipton, incumbent U.S. representative

==== Endorsements ====
Scott Tipton

Federal officials

- Donald Trump, President of the United States
Lauren Boebert

U.S. representatives

- Tom Tancredo, former U.S. representative from CO-06, candidate for Governor of Colorado in 2010, candidate for President of the United States in 2008
- Lou Vallario, Garfield County, Colorado sheriff

Organizations

- Club for Growth PAC
- Tea Party Express

==== Primary results ====
On June 30, 2020, Lauren Boebert defeated Scott Tipton by a 54.6% to 45.4% margin to win the nomination. During her campaign, Boebert criticized Alexandria Ocasio-Cortez and other members of "The Squad", positioning herself as a conservative alternative to Ocasio-Cortez. Dick Wadhams, a Republican political consultant from Denver, said that Tipton had several hundred thousand dollars in the bank for his primary against Boebert, but he chose not to use it for TV/radio ads, mailings, or social media, ceding the debate to Boebert, who inspired a much higher Republican turnout than in 2018.

County results Boebert: 50–60%; 60–70%; Tipton: 50–60%; 60–70%

Republican primary results
Party	Candidate	Votes	%
Republican	Lauren Boebert	58,678	54.6
Republican	Scott Tipton (incumbent)	48,805	45.4
Total votes		107,483	100.0

=== Democratic primary ===
==== Candidates ====
===== Nominee =====
- Diane Mitsch Bush, former state representative and nominee for Colorado's 3rd congressional district in 2018

===== Eliminated in primary =====
- James Iacino, CEO of Seattle Fish Co.

===== Withdrawn =====
- Root Routledge, U.S. Air Force veteran
- Donald Valdez, state representative

===== Declined =====
- Kerry Donovan, state Senator from the 5th District
- Leroy Garcia, president of the Colorado Senate

==== Endorsements ====
Diane Mitsch Bush

Federal officials

- Mark Udall, former U.S. senator from Colorado (2009–2015) and former U.S. Representative (CO-02) (1999–2009)

State officials

- KC Becker, Speaker of the Colorado House of Representatives and former House Majority Leader
- Janet Buckner, state representative and Speaker Pro Tempore
- Bernie Buescher, former Colorado Secretary of State (2009-11) and former state representative
- Daneya Esgar, state representative
- Joann Ginal, state senator and former state representative
- Millie Hamner, former state representative
- Edie Hooton, state representative
- Pete Lee, state senator and former state representative
- Claire Levy, former state representative
- Mike McLachlan, former state representative and former Colorado Solicitor General
- Sal Pace, former state representative
- Dylan Roberts, state representative
- Joe Salazar, former state representative

County officials

- Kathy Chandler-Henry, Eagle County Commissioner
- Nancy Stahoviak, former Routt County Commissioner
- Paula Swenson, former Gunnison County Commissioner

Local officials

- Gabrielle Aragon, former San Luis Town Councilwoman

Labor unions

- Colorado AFL-CIO
- International Union of Operating Engineers Local 1
- UNITE HERE Local 23
- United Food and Commercial Workers Union Local 7

Organizations

- National Committee for an Effective Congress
- National Organization for Women PAC
- Planned Parenthood Action Fund
James Iacino

Federal officials

- Dan Baer, former United States Ambassador to the OSCE (2013-17)
- John Salazar, former U.S. representative (CO-03) (2005-11) and former Agriculture Commissioner of Colorado (2011-14)
- Ken Salazar, former United States Secretary of Interior (2009–2013), former U.S. Senator from Colorado (2005-09), and former Colorado Attorney General (1999–2005)

State officials

- Mike Callihan, former lieutenant governor of Colorado (1987-94)
- Gail Schwartz, former state senator
- Kathleen Sullivan-Kelley, former state representative
- Phil Weiser, Colorado Attorney General

County officials

- Steve Child, Pitkin County Commissioner
- Clyde Church, La Plata County Commissioner
- Gerald Cisneros, Huerfano County Commissioner
- John Egan, former Archuleta County Commissioner
- Gwen Lachelt, La Plata County Commissioner
- Bill Masters, San Miguel County Sheriff
- Garrison Ortiz, Pueblo County Commissioner
- Lawrence Pacheco, Costilla County Commissioner
- Greg Poschman, Pitkin County Commissioner
- Helen Sigmond, Alamosa County Commissioner
- Robert Willet, District Attorney for Colorado's 12th Judicial District
- Chris Wiseman, Pueblo County Commissioner

Local officials

- Dave Bowman, former mayor of Montrose
- Dean Brookie, mayor of Durango
- Ed Brown, Pueblo, Colorado City Council Vice President
- Barbara Bynum, mayor of Montrose
- Will Dujardin, mayor pro-tempore of Crested Butte
- Dennis Flores, Pueblo, Colorado City Council President
- Mick Ireland, former mayor of Aspen
- Bill Kane, mayor of Basalt
- Sweetie Marbury, former mayor of Durango
- Skippy Mesirow, Aspen Councilman
- Ann Mullins, Aspen Councilwoman
- Dan Richardson, mayor of Carbondale
- Auden Schendler, former Basalt town Councilman

Labor unions

- American Postal Workers Union Denver Metro Area Local

Newspapers

- The Durango Herald

Individuals

- Trish Zornio, former 2020 United States Senate election in Colorado candidate

==== Primary results ====
County results Bush: 50–60%; 60–70%; 70–80%; 80–90%; Iacino: 50–60%; 60–70%

Democratic primary results
Party	Candidate	Votes	%
Democratic	Diane Mitsch Bush	65,377	61.3
Democratic	James Iacino	41,200	38.7
Total votes		106,577	100.0

=== Others ===
==== Libertarian Party nominee ====
- John Ryan Keil, businessman

==== Unity Party nominee ====
- Critter Milton, financial advisor

==== Independent (withdrawn) ====
- Robert Moser, publisher and former sales executive

=== General election ===
==== Predictions ====
Source	Ranking	As of
The Cook Political Report	Lean R	September 29, 2020
Inside Elections	Tilt R	October 29, 2020
Sabato's Crystal Ball	Lean R	September 3, 2020
Politico	Lean R	September 8, 2020
Daily Kos	Lean R	August 31, 2020
RCP	Tossup	October 24, 2020
Niskanen	Safe R	July 26, 2020

==== Post-primary endorsements ====
Diane Mitsch Bush

Former US Executive Branch officials

- Barack Obama, former president of the United States (2009–2017), former Senator from Illinois (2005–2008)

State officials

- Michael Bennet, Senator
- John Hickenlooper, former governor and 2020 candidate for Senate
- Phil Weiser, Colorado Attorney General

Newspapers

- Aspen Daily News
- Denver Post
- Durango Herald
- Grand Junction Daily Sentinel (suggested)
- Pueblo Chieftain

Organizations

- Giffords
- League of Conservation Voters
- Sierra Club
Lauren Boebert

Federal officials

- Donald Trump, President of the United States

U.S. representatives

- Ken Buck, U.S. representative from CO-04
- Elise Stefanik, U.S. representative from NY-21

==== Polling ====
Poll source	Date(s) administered	Sample size (Note: Key: A – all adults RV – registered voters LV – likely voters V – unclear)	Margin of error	Lauren Boebert (R)	Diane Mitsch Bush (D)	Other/ Undecided
DCCC Targeting & Analytics (D) (Note: Poll sponsored by the DCCC, which endorsed Busch prior to the sampling period.)	October 19–20, 2020	491 (LV)	± 4.4%	43%	44%	7% (Note: Keil (L) with 5%; Milton (U) with 2%)
Expedition Strategies (D) (Note: Archived September 22, 2020, at the Wayback Machine) (Note: Poll conducted for the House Majority PAC.)	September 9–14, 2020	754 (LV)	± 3.6%	44%	46%	9% (Note: Keil (L) with 3%; Milton (U) with 1%; Undecided with 5%)
GQR Research (D) (Note: Poll conducted for Diane Mitsch Bush.)	August 3–6, 2020	400 (LV)	± 4.9%	42%	43%	15% (Note: Moser (I) with 5%; Keil (L) with 4%; Milton (U) and "Other" with 1%; Undecided with 4%)

==== Results ====
Boebert defeated Bush by six percent on November 3, 2020, 51.39% to 45.22%. Boebert raised $2.4 million and Bush raised $4.2 million. Republican groups spent more than $5 million. Democratic groups spent nearly $4 million. Despite her win, however, Boebert lost her home county Garfield to Bush.

Colorado's 3rd congressional district, 2020
Party	Candidate	Votes	%
Republican	Lauren Boebert	220,634	51.4
Democratic	Diane Mitsch Bush	194,122	45.2
Libertarian	John Keil	10,298	2.4
Unity	Critter Milton	4,265	1.0
Total votes		429,319	100.0
Republican hold			

== District 4 ==
2020 Colorado's 4th congressional district election
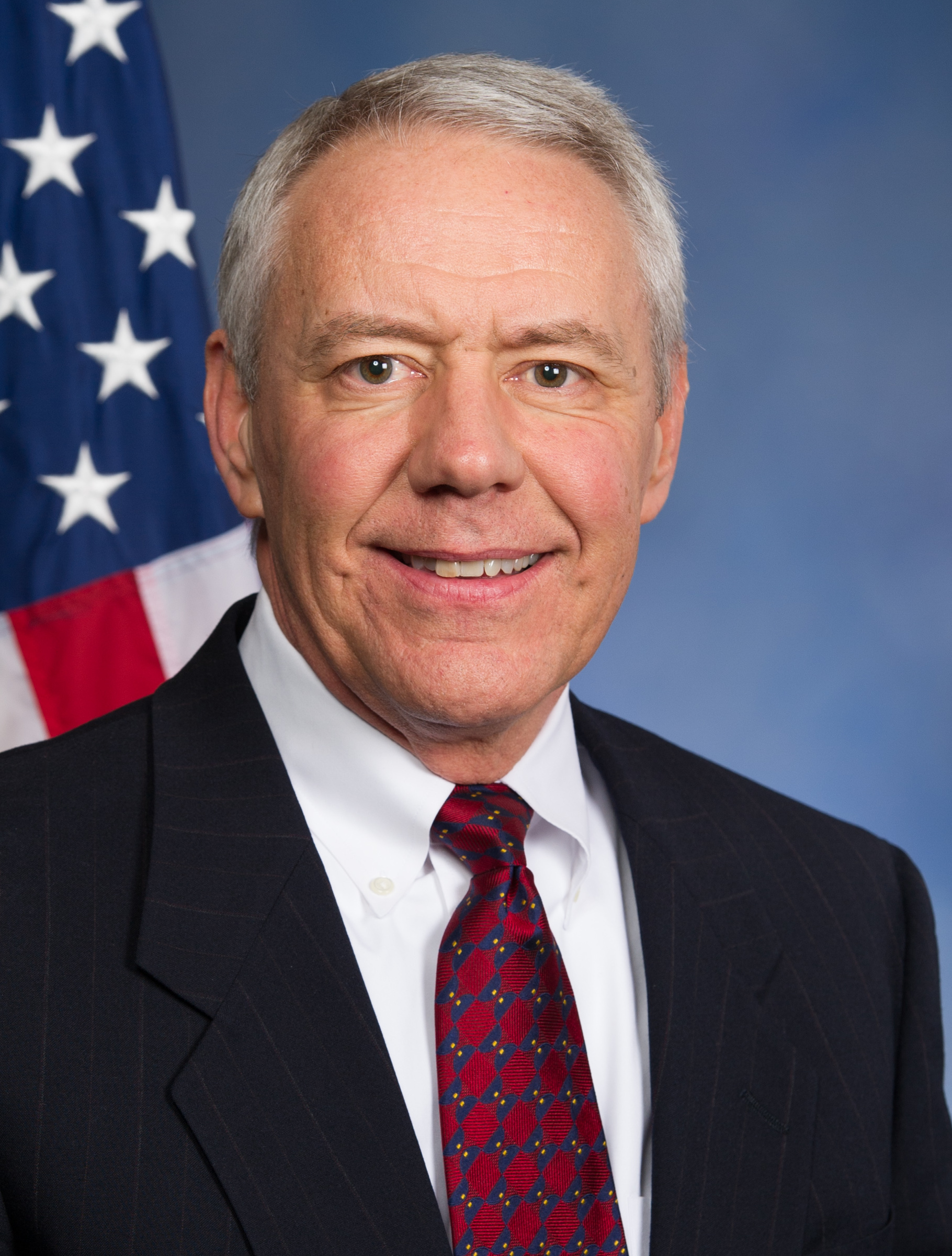

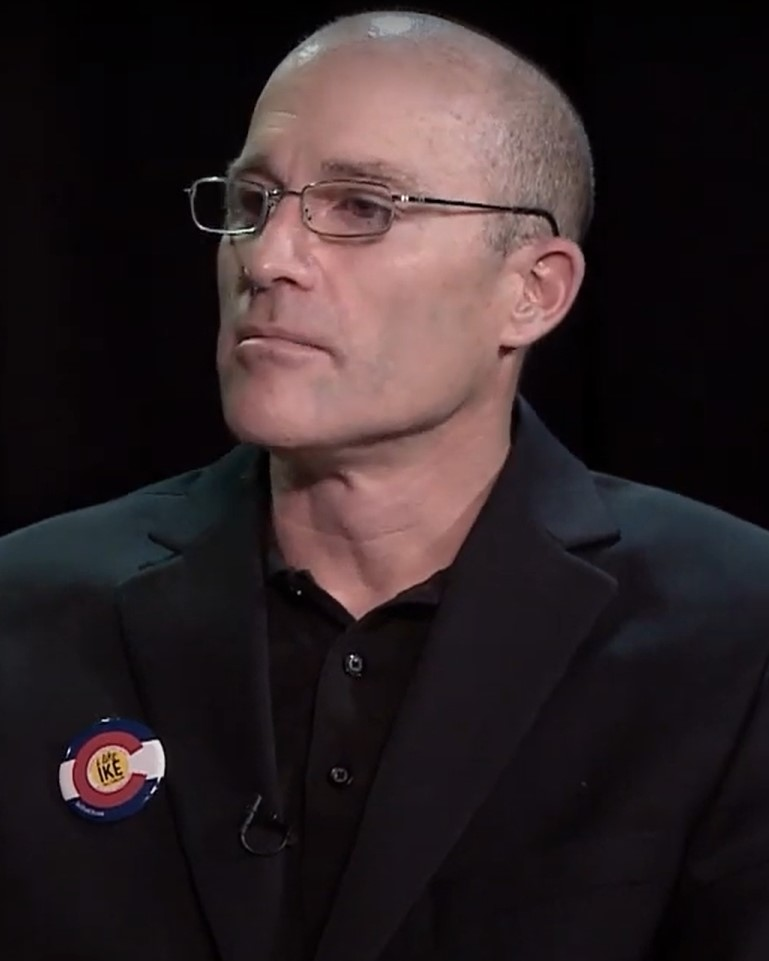
Nominee	Ken Buck	Ike McCorkle
Party	Republican	Democratic
Popular vote	285,606	173,945
Percentage	60.1%	36.6%
- Buck: 40–50% 50–60% 60–70% 70–80% 80–90% >90% McCorkle: 40–50% 50–60% 60–70% 70–80% No data
U.S. Representatives before election
Ken Buck
Republican
Elected U.S. Representatives
Ken Buck
Republican

The 4th district encompasses rural eastern Colorado, the Front Range cities of Greeley and Longmont, as well as the southern Denver exurbs, including Castle Rock and Parker. The incumbent was Republican Ken Buck, who was re-elected with 60.6% of the vote in 2018.

=== Republican primary ===
==== Candidates ====
===== Declared =====
- Ken Buck, incumbent U.S. representative

==== Primary results ====
Republican primary results
Party	Candidate	Votes	%
Republican	Ken Buck (incumbent)	109,230	100.0
Total votes		109,230	100.0

=== Democratic primary ===
==== Candidates ====
===== Declared =====
- Issac "Ike" McCorkle, former U.S. Marine Corps officer

==== Primary results ====
Democratic primary results
Party	Candidate	Votes	%
Democratic	Ike McCorkle	81,719	100.0
Total votes		81,719	100.0

=== General election ===
==== Predictions ====
Source	Ranking	As of
The Cook Political Report	Safe R	July 2, 2020
Inside Elections	Safe R	June 2, 2020
Sabato's Crystal Ball	Safe R	July 2, 2020
Politico	Safe R	April 19, 2020
Daily Kos	Safe R	June 3, 2020
RCP	Safe R	June 9, 2020
Niskanen	Safe R	June 7, 2020

==== Results ====
Colorado's 4th congressional district, 2020
Party	Candidate	Votes	%
Republican	Ken Buck (incumbent)	285,606	60.1
Democratic	Ike McCorkle	173,945	36.6
Libertarian	Bruce Griffith	11,026	2.3
Unity	Laura Ireland	4,530	1.0
Total votes		475,107	100.0
Republican hold			

== District 5 ==
2020 Colorado's 5th congressional district election
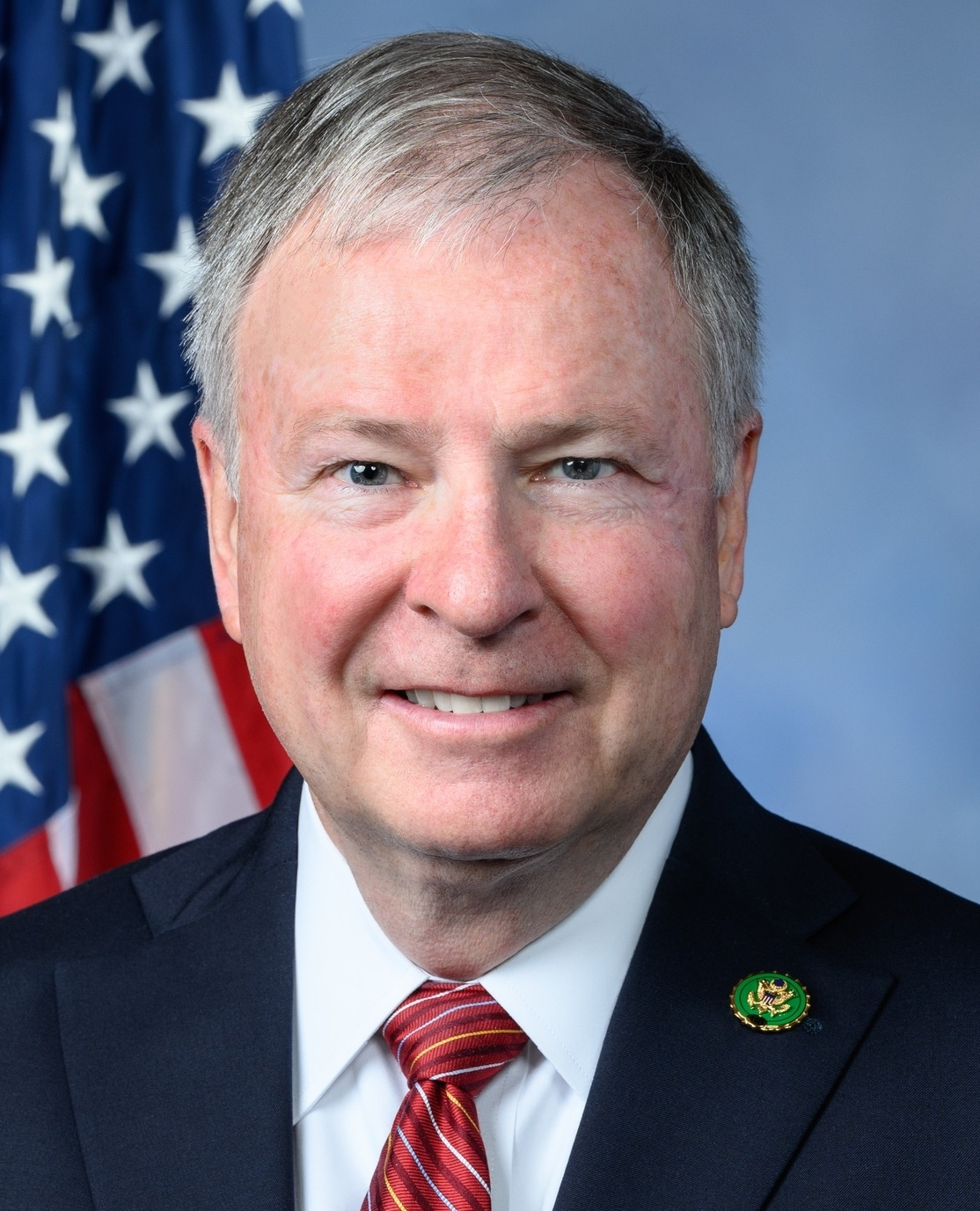

Nominee	Doug Lamborn	Jillian Freeland
Party	Republican	Democratic
Popular vote	249,013	161,600
Percentage	57.6%	37.4%
- Lamborn: 40–50% 50–60% 60–70% 70–80% 80–90% Freeland: 40–50% 50–60% 60–70% 70–80% Tie: 40–50%
U.S. Representatives before election
Doug Lamborn
Republican
Elected U.S. Representatives
Doug Lamborn
Republican

The 5th district is based in Colorado Springs and its suburbs. The incumbent was Republican Doug Lamborn, who was re-elected with 57.0% of the vote in 2018.

=== Republican primary ===
==== Candidates ====
===== Declared =====
- Doug Lamborn, incumbent U.S. representative

==== Primary results ====
Republican primary results
Party	Candidate	Votes	%
Republican	Doug Lamborn (incumbent)	104,302	100.0
Total votes		104,302	100.0

=== Democratic primary ===
==== Candidates ====
===== Declared =====
- Jillian Freeland, businesswoman

===== Withdrawn =====
- Brandon Bocchino, entrepreneur
- George English, U.S. Army veteran
- Ryan Lucas, health care worker
- Mario Sanchez

==== Endorsements ====
Jillian Freeland

Unions

- AFL-CIO Colorado

==== Primary results ====
Democratic primary results
Party	Candidate	Votes	%
Democratic	Jillian Freeland	76,033	100.0
Total votes		76,033	100.0

=== Others ===
==== Unity ====
- Rebecca Keltie, U.S. navy veteran

=== General election ===
==== Predictions ====
Source	Ranking	As of
The Cook Political Report	Safe R	July 2, 2020
Inside Elections	Safe R	June 2, 2020
Sabato's Crystal Ball	Safe R	July 2, 2020
Politico	Safe R	April 19, 2020
Daily Kos	Safe R	June 3, 2020
RCP	Safe R	June 9, 2020
Niskanen	Safe R	June 7, 2020

==== Endorsements ====
Jillian Freeland (D)

Organizations

- Indivisible

==== Results ====
Colorado's 5th congressional district, 2020
Party	Candidate	Votes	%
Republican	Doug Lamborn (incumbent)	249,013	57.6
Democratic	Jillian Freeland	161,600	37.4
Libertarian	Ed Duffett	14,777	3.4
Independent	Marcus Allen Murphy	3,708	0.9
Unity	Rebecca Keltie	3,309	0.8
Total votes		432,407	100.0
Republican hold			

== District 6 ==
2020 Colorado's 6th congressional district election
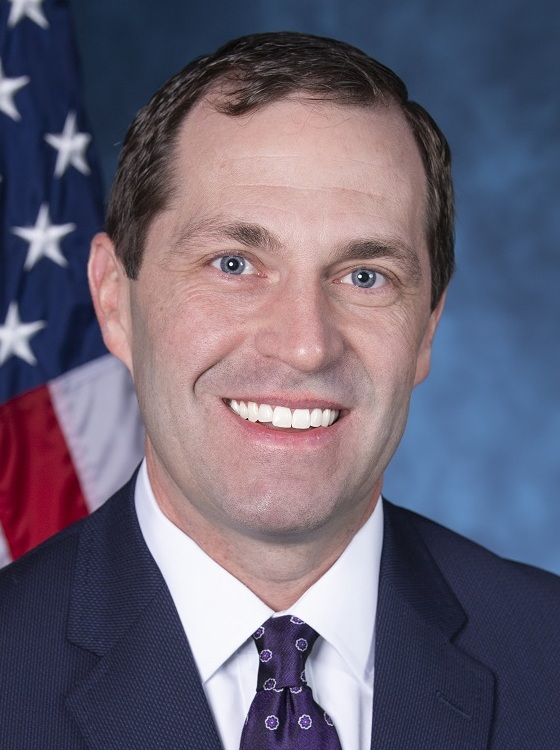

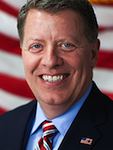
Nominee	Jason Crow	Steve House
Party	Democratic	Republican
Popular vote	250,314	175,192
Percentage	57.1%	40.0%
- Crow: 40–50% 50–60% 60–70% 70–80% 80–90% House: 40–50% 50–60% 60–70% 70–80% Tie: 40–50% No data
U.S. Representatives before election
Jason Crow
Democratic
Elected U.S. Representatives
Jason Crow
Democratic

The 6th district is based in the southern suburbs of the Denver-Aurora metropolitan area including, Aurora, Brighton, Centennial, and Highlands Ranch. The incumbent was Democrat Jason Crow, who flipped the district and was elected with 54.1% of the vote in 2018.

=== Democratic primary ===
==== Candidates ====
===== Declared =====
- Jason Crow, incumbent U.S. representative

==== Endorsements ====
Jason Crow

Former US Executive Branch officials

- Barack Obama, former president of the United States (2009–2017), former Senator from Illinois (2005–2008)

U.S. vice presidents

- Joe Biden, former vice president and Democratic nominee for the 2020 United States presidential election

Organizations

- League of Conservation Voters Action Fund
- Sierra Club

==== Primary results ====
Democratic primary results
Party	Candidate	Votes	%
Democratic	Jason Crow (incumbent)	122,929	100.0
Total votes		122,929	100.0

=== Republican primary ===
==== Candidates ====
===== Declared =====
- Steve House, former chairman of the Colorado Republican Party

===== Withdrawn =====
- Casper Stockham, U.S. Air Force veteran, motivational speaker, and nominee for Colorado's 1st congressional district in 2016 and 2018 (Ran for CO-07)

===== Declined =====
- Mike Coffman, former U.S. representative and mayor of Aurora

==== Endorsements ====
Steve House

State legislators

- Owen Hill, former state senator from the 10th district (2013–2021)
- Janice Rich, state representative from the 55th district (2019–)
- Ray Scott, state senator from the 7th district (2015–)
- Jerry Sonnenberg, state senator from the 1st district (2015–)
- Matt Soper, state representative from the 54th district (2019–)

==== Primary results ====
Republican primary results
Party	Candidate	Votes	%
Republican	Steve House	63,635	100.0
Total votes		63,635	100.0

=== General election ===
==== Predictions ====
Source	Ranking	As of
The Cook Political Report	Safe D	July 17, 2020
Inside Elections	Safe D	June 2, 2020
Sabato's Crystal Ball	Safe D	July 2, 2020
Politico	Likely D	April 19, 2020
Daily Kos	Safe D	June 3, 2020
RCP	Safe D	October 24, 2020
Niskanen	Safe D	June 7, 2020

==== Results ====
Colorado's 6th congressional district, 2020
Party	Candidate	Votes	%
Democratic	Jason Crow (incumbent)	250,314	57.1
Republican	Steve House	175,192	40.0
Libertarian	Norm Olsen	9,083	2.1
Unity	Jaimie Kulikowski	3,884	0.9
Total votes		438,473	100.0
Democratic hold			

== District 7 ==
2020 Colorado's 7th congressional district election
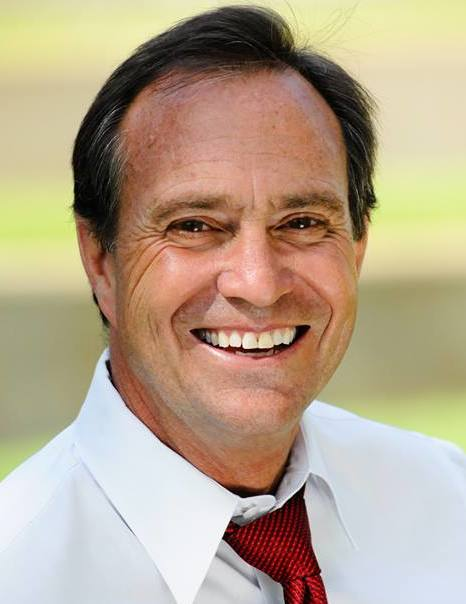

Nominee	Ed Perlmutter	Casper Stockham
Party	Democratic	Republican
Popular vote	250,525	159,301
Percentage	59.1%	37.6%
- Perlmutter: 40–50% 50–60% 60–70% 70–80% Stockham: 40–50% 50–60% 70–80% No data
U.S. Representatives before election
Ed Perlmutter
Democratic
Elected U.S. Representatives
Ed Perlmutter
Democratic

The 7th district encompasses the northern and western suburbs of Denver including, Arvada, Lakewood, Golden, Thornton, and Westminster. The incumbent was Democrat Ed Perlmutter, who was re-elected with 60.4% of the vote in 2018.

=== Democratic primary ===
==== Candidates ====
===== Declared =====
- Ed Perlmutter, incumbent U.S. representative

==== Endorsements ====
Ed Perlmutter

Organizations

- J Street PAC
- Planned Parenthood Action Fund
- Sierra Club

==== Primary results ====
Democratic primary results
Party	Candidate	Votes	%
Democratic	Ed Perlmutter (incumbent)	125,880	100.0
Total votes		125,880	100.0

=== Republican primary ===
==== Declared ====
- Casper Stockham, U.S. Air Force veteran, motivational speaker, and nominee for Colorado's 1st congressional district in 2016 and 2018

==== Primary results ====
Republican primary results
Party	Candidate	Votes	%
Republican	Casper Stockham	52,488	100.0
Total votes		52,488	100.0

=== General election ===
==== Predictions ====
Source	Ranking	As of
The Cook Political Report	Safe D	July 2, 2020
Inside Elections	Safe D	June 2, 2020
Sabato's Crystal Ball	Safe D	July 2, 2020
Politico	Safe D	April 19, 2020
Daily Kos	Safe D	June 3, 2020
RCP	Safe D	June 9, 2020
Niskanen	Safe D	June 7, 2020

==== Results ====
Colorado's 7th congressional district, 2020
Party	Candidate	Votes	%
Democratic	Ed Perlmutter (incumbent)	250,525	59.1
Republican	Casper Stockham	159,301	37.6
Libertarian	Ken Biles	11,510	2.7
Unity	Dave Olszta	2,355	0.6
Total votes		423,691	100.0
Democratic hold			

== Notes ==
Partisan clients
