= 2012 United States House of Representatives elections in Colorado =

- November 6, 2012

All 7 Colorado seats to the United States House of Representatives
	Majority party	Minority party
Party	Republican	Democratic
Last election	4	3
Seats won	4	3
Seat change	Steady	Steady
Popular vote	1,143,796	1,080,153
Percentage	46.68%	44.08%
Swing	▼3.46%	▼1.34%

Republican
40–50%
50–60%
60–70%
70–80%
80–90%
Democratic
40–50%
50–60%
60–70%
70–80%

The 2012 United States House of Representatives elections in Colorado were held on Tuesday, November 6, 2012, to elect the seven U.S. representatives from the state, one from each of the state's seven congressional districts. The elections coincided with the elections of other federal and state offices, including a quadrennial presidential election. Primary elections were held on June 26, 2012.

== Overview ==
=== Statewide ===
Party	Candidates	Votes		Seats		
Party	Candidates	No.	%	No.	+/–	%
Republican	7	1,143,796	46.68	4	Steady	57.14
Democratic	6	1,080,153	44.08	3	Steady	42.95
Libertarian	7	85,772	3.50	0	Steady	0.0
Independent	3	77,885	3.18	0	Steady	0.0
Green	3	33,526	1.37	0	Steady	0.0
Constitution	3	29,356	1.20	0	Steady	0.0
Total	29	2,450,488	100.0	7	Steady	100.0

Popular vote
Republican	46.68%
Democratic	44.08%
Libertarian	3.50%
Other	5.75%

House seats
Republican	57.14%
Democratic	42.86%

=== By district ===
Results of the 2012 United States House of Representatives elections in Colorado by district:

District	Republican		Democratic		Libertarian		Others		Total		Result
District	Votes	%	Votes	%	Votes	%	Votes	%	Votes	%	Result
District 1	93,217	26.77%	237,579	68.23%	12,585	3.61%	4,829	1.39%	348,210	100.0%	Democratic hold
District 2	162,639	38.58%	234,758	55.69%	13,770	3.27%	10,413	2.47%	421,580	100.0%	Democratic hold
District 3	185,291	53.31%	142,920	41.12%	11,125	3.20%	8,212	2.36%	347,548	100.0%	Republican hold
District 4	200,006	58.42%	125,800	36.75%	10,682	3.12%	5,848	1.71%	342,336	100.0%	Republican hold
District 5	199,639	64.98%	0	0.00%	22,778	7.41%	31,496	10.25%	307,231	100.0%	Republican hold
District 6	163,938	47.81%	156,937	45.77%	8,597	2.51%	13,442	3.92%	342,914	100.0%	Republican hold
District 7	139,066	40.79%	182,460	53.51%	9,148	2.68%	10,296	3.02%	340,970	100.0%	Democratic hold
Total	1,143,796	46.68%	1,080,153	44.08%	85,772	3.50%	140,767	5.75%	2,450,488	100.0%	

== Redistricting ==
During the redistricting process, Republicans argued for minimal changes to the existing map while Democrats pushed for more competitive districts. After a committee of ten members of the Colorado General Assembly failed to draw a map, in November 2011, Judge Robert Hyatt ruled in favor of Democrats' proposals. In December 2011, the Colorado Supreme Court affirmed Hyatt's ruling.

== District 1 ==
2012 Colorado's 1st congressional district election
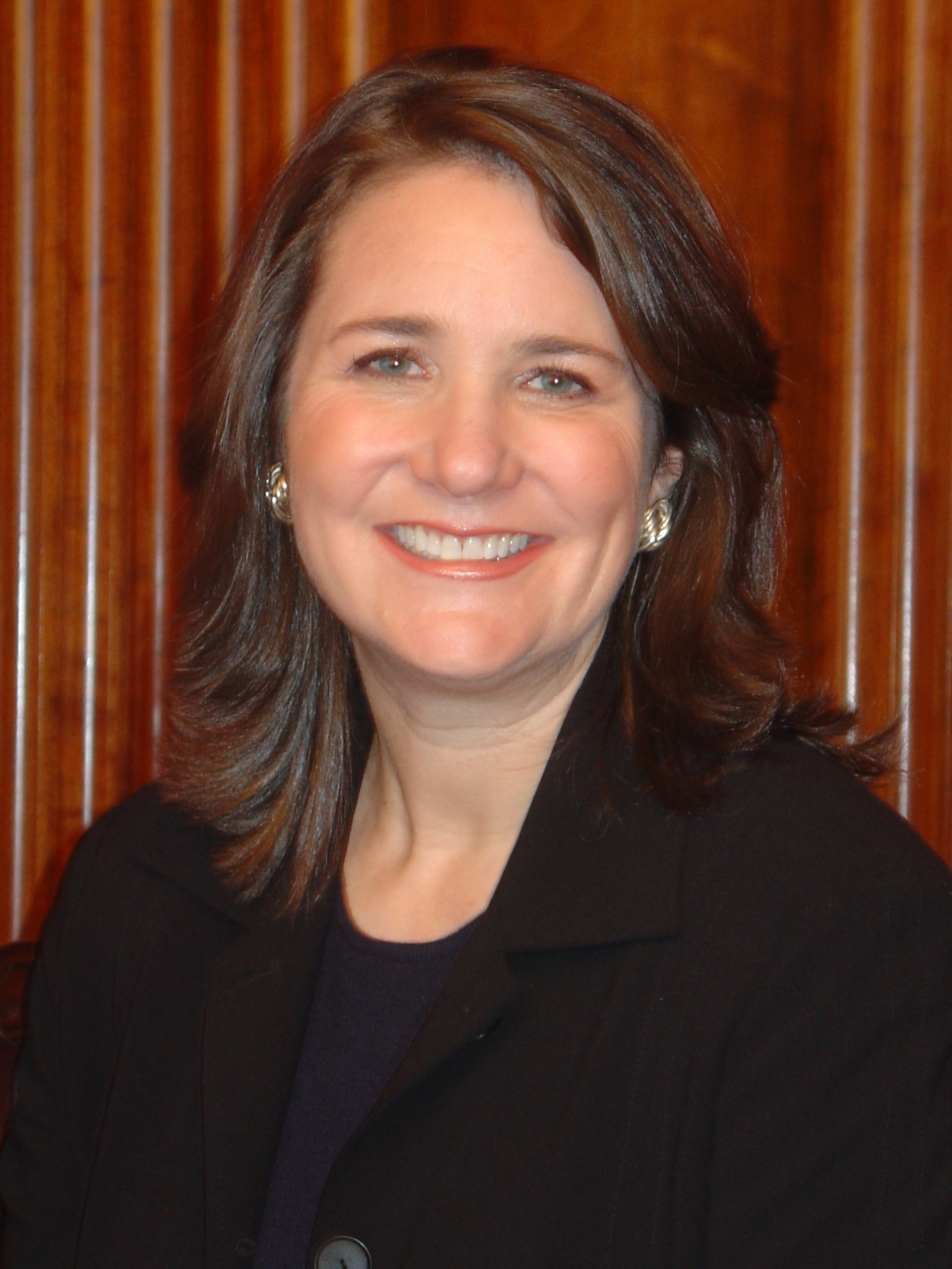

Nominee	Diana DeGette	Danny Stroud
Party	Democratic	Republican
Popular vote	237,579	93,217
Percentage	68.2%	26.8%
- County results DeGette: 50–60% 70–80% Stroud: 50–60%
U.S. Representative before election
Diana DeGette
Democratic
Elected U.S. Representative
Diana DeGette
Democratic

Colorado's 1st congressional district, which had been represented by Democrat Diana DeGette since 1997, was not significantly modified in redistricting and continues to be based in Denver. The new 1st district includes Ken Caryl and Cherry Hills Village.

=== Democratic primary ===
==== Candidates ====
===== Nominee =====
- Diana DeGette, incumbent U.S. representative

==== Primary results ====
Democratic primary results
Party	Candidate	Votes	%
Democratic	Diana DeGette (incumbent)	37,072	100.0
Total votes		37,072	100.0

=== Republican primary ===
==== Candidates ====
===== Nominee =====
- Danny Stroud, Army major

===== Eliminated in primary =====
- Richard Murphy

==== Primary results ====
Republican primary results
Party	Candidate	Votes	%
Republican	Danny Stroud	11,936	65.1
Republican	Richard W. Murphy	6,407	34.9
Total votes		18,343	100.0

=== General election ===
==== Endorsements ====
Diana DeGette (D)

Labor unions

- International Brotherhood of Boilermakers
- National Association of Letter Carriers
- National Education Association
- United Steelworkers

Organizations

- Feminist Majority
- Human Rights Campaign
- Humane Society of the United States
- J Street
- NARAL Pro-Choice America
- National Organization for Women
- Planned Parenthood Action Fund
- Sierra Club

Newspapers

- The Denver Post

==== Predictions ====
Source	Ranking	As of
The Cook Political Report	Safe D	November 5, 2012
Rothenberg	Safe D	November 2, 2012
Roll Call	Safe D	November 4, 2012
Sabato's Crystal Ball	Safe D	November 5, 2012
NY Times	Safe D	November 4, 2012
RCP	Safe D	November 4, 2012
The Hill	Safe D	November 4, 2012

==== Results ====
Colorado's 1st congressional district, 2012
Party	Candidate	Votes	%
Democratic	Diana DeGette (incumbent)	237,579	68.2
Republican	Danny Stroud	93,217	26.8
Libertarian	Frank Atwood	12,585	3.6
Green	Gary Swing	4,829	1.4
Total votes		348,210	100.0
Democratic hold			

== District 2 ==
2012 Colorado's 2nd congressional district election
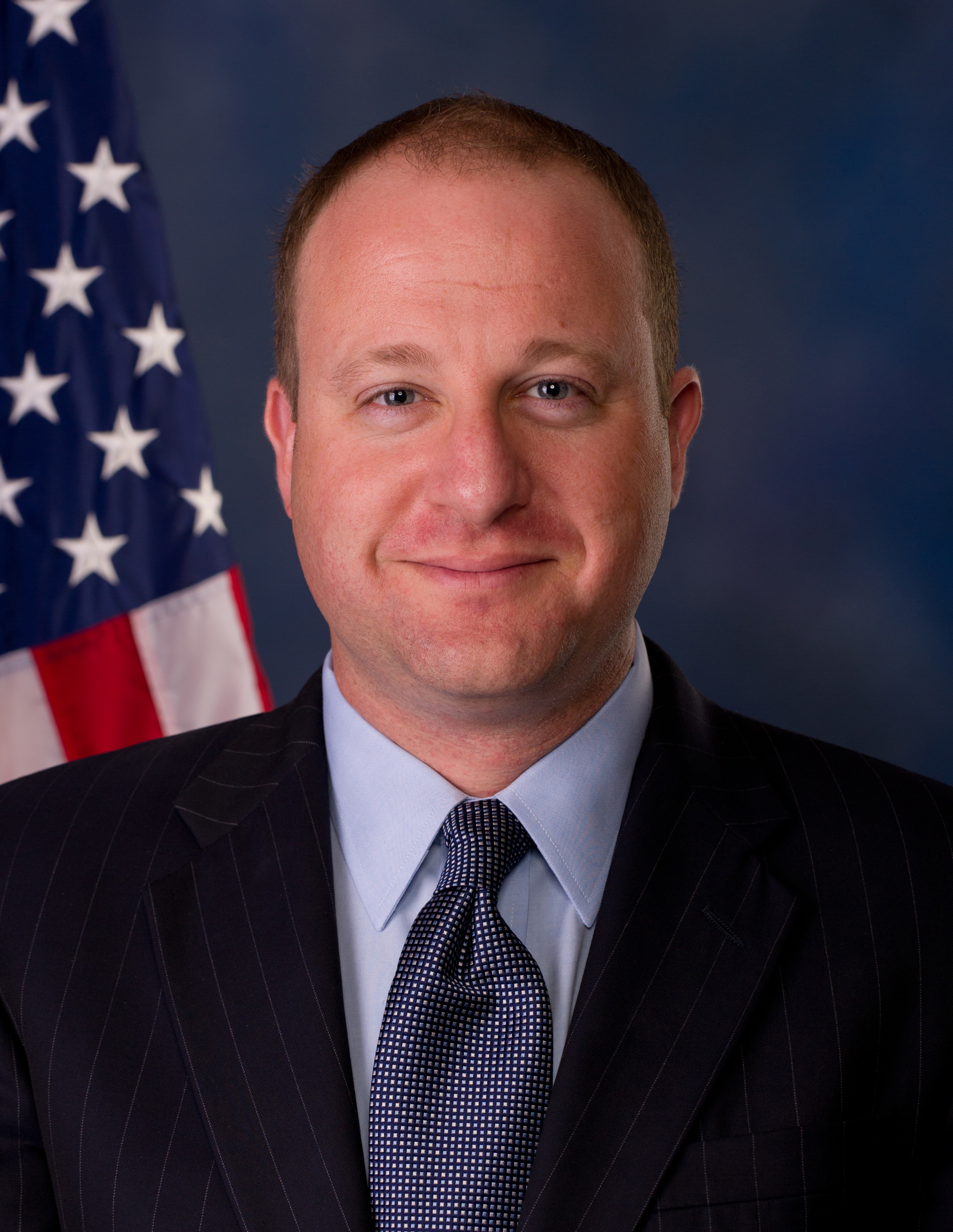

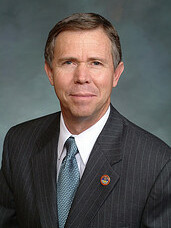
Nominee	Jared Polis	Kevin Lundberg
Party	Democratic	Republican
Popular vote	234,758	162,639
Percentage	55.7%	38.6%
- County results Polis: 40–50% 50–60% 70–80% Lundberg: 50–60%
U.S. Representative before election
Jared Polis
Democratic
Elected U.S. Representative
Jared Polis
Democratic

In redistricting, Larimer County, home to Fort Collins, was added to Colorado's 2nd congressional district, which had been represented by Democrat Jared Polis since 2009 and is still based in Boulder.

=== Democratic primary ===
==== Candidates ====
===== Nominee =====
- Jared Polis, incumbent U.S. representative

==== Primary results ====
Democratic primary results
Party	Candidate	Votes	%
Democratic	Jared Polis (incumbent)	36,097	100.0
Total votes		36,097	100.0

=== Republican primary ===
==== Candidates ====
===== Nominee =====
- Kevin Lundberg, state senator

===== Eliminated in primary =====
- Eric Weissmann, businessman

==== Primary results ====
Republican primary results
Party	Candidate	Votes	%
Republican	Kevin Lundberg	21,547	53.3
Republican	Eric Weissmann	18,890	46.7
Total votes		40,437	100.0

=== General election ===
==== Endorsements ====
Jared Polis (D)

Labor unions

- International Brotherhood of Boilermakers
- National Association of Letter Carriers
- National Education Association

Organizations

- Feminist Majority
- Human Rights Campaign
- Humane Society of the United States
- J Street
- Planned Parenthood Action Fund
- Sierra Club

Newspapers

- The Denver Post
Kevin Lundberg (R)

Organizations

- Eagle Forum
- Gun Owners of America
- National Republican Congressional Committee "On the Radar" Program
- National Right to Life Committee
- NRA Political Victory Fund

==== Predictions ====
Source	Ranking	As of
The Cook Political Report	Safe D	November 5, 2012
Rothenberg	Safe D	November 2, 2012
Roll Call	Safe D	November 4, 2012
Sabato's Crystal Ball	Safe D	November 5, 2012
NY Times	Safe D	November 4, 2012
RCP	Safe D	November 4, 2012
The Hill	Safe D	November 4, 2012

==== Results ====
Colorado's 2nd congressional district, 2012
Party	Candidate	Votes	%
Democratic	Jared Polis (incumbent)	234,758	55.7
Republican	Kevin Lundberg	162,639	38.6
Libertarian	Randy Luallin	13,770	3.3
Green	Susan P. Hall	10,413	2.5
Total votes		421,580	100.0
Democratic hold			

== District 3 ==
2012 Colorado's 3rd congressional district election
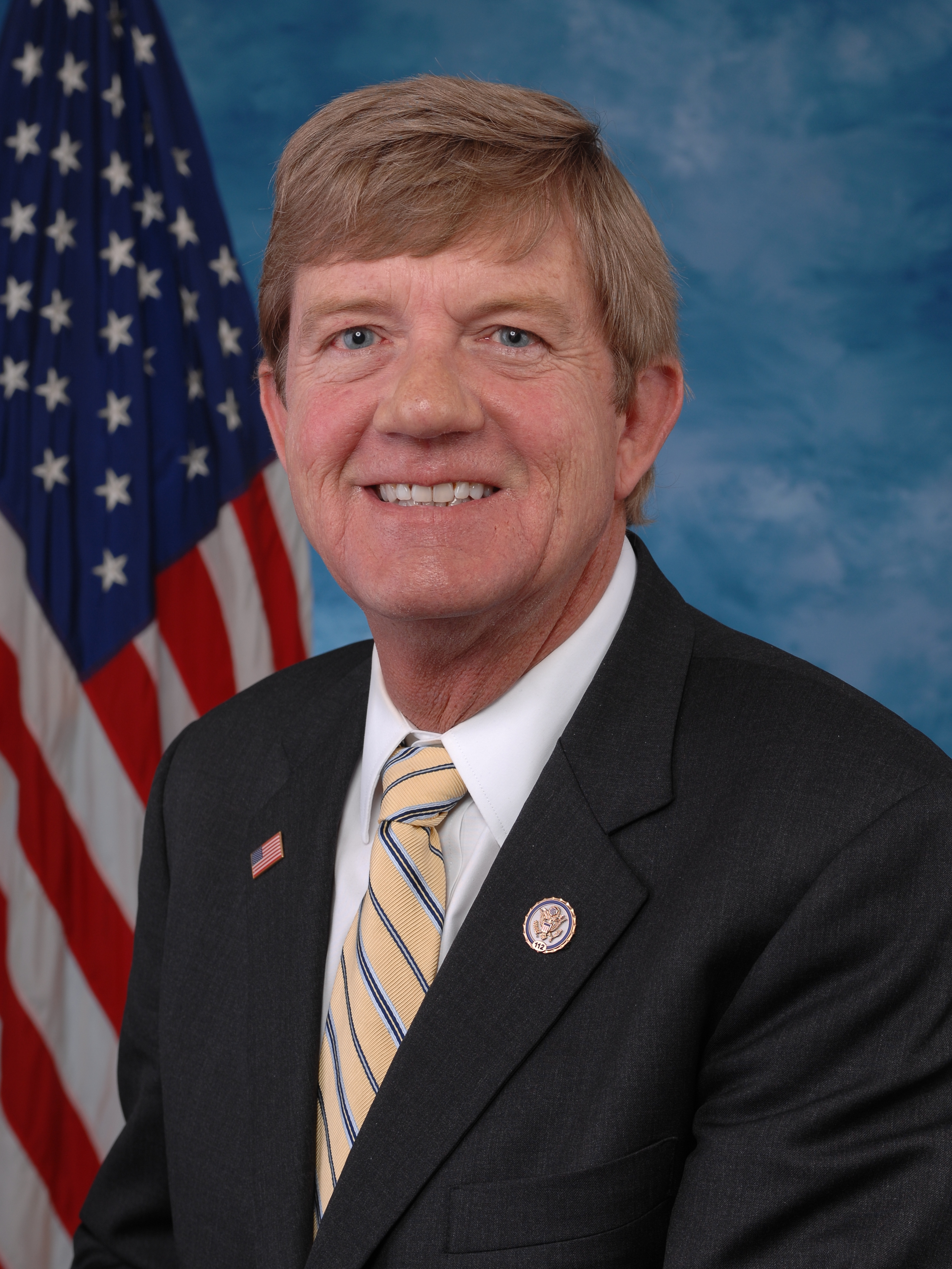

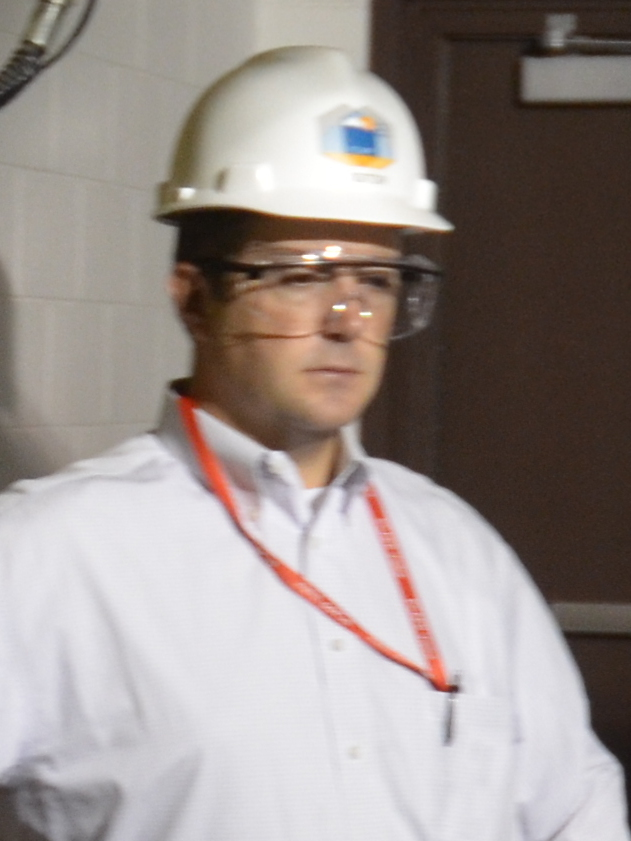
Nominee	Scott Tipton	Sal Pace
Party	Republican	Democratic
Popular vote	185,291	142,920
Percentage	53.3%	41.1%
- County results Tipton: 40–50% 50–60% 60–70% 70–80% 80–90% Bush: 40–50% 50–60% 60–70%
U.S. Representative before election
Scott Tipton
Republican
Elected U.S. Representative
Scott Tipton
Republican

In redistricting, Colorado's 3rd congressional district, which stretches from Pueblo to Grand Junction, was made slightly more favorable to Democrats. Part of Eagle County was added to the district, while Las Animas County was removed from it.

=== Republican primary ===
==== Candidates ====
===== Nominee =====
- Scott Tipton, incumbent U.S. representative

==== Primary results ====
Republican primary results
Party	Candidate	Votes	%
Republican	Scott Tipton (incumbent)	48,465	100.0
Total votes		48,465	100.0

=== Democratic primary ===
Democrat John Salazar, who represented the district from 2005 until 2011, said in December 2010 that he was considering seeking a rematch against Republican Scott Tipton, to whom he lost his seat in 2010. He commented, "We're thinking that we might run again in two years, but who knows? I'm keeping all options open. We've been offered a possibility of serving at many other places, or there's a great possibility of going back to the ranch and raising cattle." In January 2011, Governor John Hickenlooper appointed Salazar to serve as Colorado Agriculture Commissioner.

On May 19, 2011, Democratic state representative Sal Pace said he was "likely to put a campaign together", having met with U.S. House minority whip Steny Hoyer. On May 31, Pace declared his intention to challenge Tipton. Hoyer also suggested the name of Perry Haney, a surgeon, as a potential candidate; however, Haney later formed an exploratory committee to run in the 6th district but withdrew from the race in February 2012.

==== Candidates ====
===== Nominee =====
- Sal Pace, state representative

===== Declined =====
- Perry Haney, surgeon
- John Salazar, former U.S. representative

==== Primary results ====
Democratic primary results
Party	Candidate	Votes	%
Democratic	Sal Pace	33,970	100.0
Total votes		33,970	100.0

=== Libertarian primary ===
==== Primary results ====
Libertarian primary results
Party	Candidate	Votes	%
Libertarian	Gregory Gilman	166	60.6
Libertarian	Gaylon Kent	108	39.4
Total votes		274	100.0

Tisha Casida, a businesswoman, ran as an independent candidate.

=== General election ===
==== Endorsements ====
Scott Tipton (R)

Organizations

- Campaign for Working Families
- GOProud
- National Republican Congressional Committee "Patriot" Program
- National Right to Life Committee
- NRA Political Victory Fund
- United States Chamber of Commerce

Newspapers

- The Denver Post
Sal Pace (D)

Labor unions

- International Brotherhood of Boilermakers
- National Association of Letter Carriers
- United Steelworkers

Organizations

- Blue Dog Coalition
- Democratic Congressional Campaign Committee "Red to Blue" Program
- Feminist Majority
- Human Rights Campaign
- J Street
- League of Conservation Voters
- Sierra Club

==== Polling ====
Poll source	Date(s) administered	Sample size	Margin of error	Scott Tipton (R)	Sal Pace (D)	Others	Undecided
Grove Insight (D-DCCC)	September 25–27, 2012	400	± 4.9%	42%	39%	5%	13%
Public Policy Polling (D-House Majority PAC)	January 18–23, 2012	569	± 4.1%	46%	39%	—	15%

==== Predictions ====
Source	Ranking	As of
The Cook Political Report	Lean R	November 5, 2012
Rothenberg	Likely R	November 2, 2012
Roll Call	Tossup	November 4, 2012
Sabato's Crystal Ball	Likely R	November 5, 2012
NY Times	Lean R	November 4, 2012
RCP	Lean R	November 4, 2012
The Hill	Lean R	November 4, 2012

==== Results ====
Colorado's 3rd congressional district, 2012
Party	Candidate	Votes	%
Republican	Scott Tipton (incumbent)	185,291	53.3
Democratic	Sal Pace	142,920	41.1
Independent	Tisha Casida	11,125	3.2
Libertarian	Gregory Gilman	8,212	2.4
Total votes		347,548	100.0
Republican hold			

== District 4 ==
2012 Colorado's 4th congressional district election
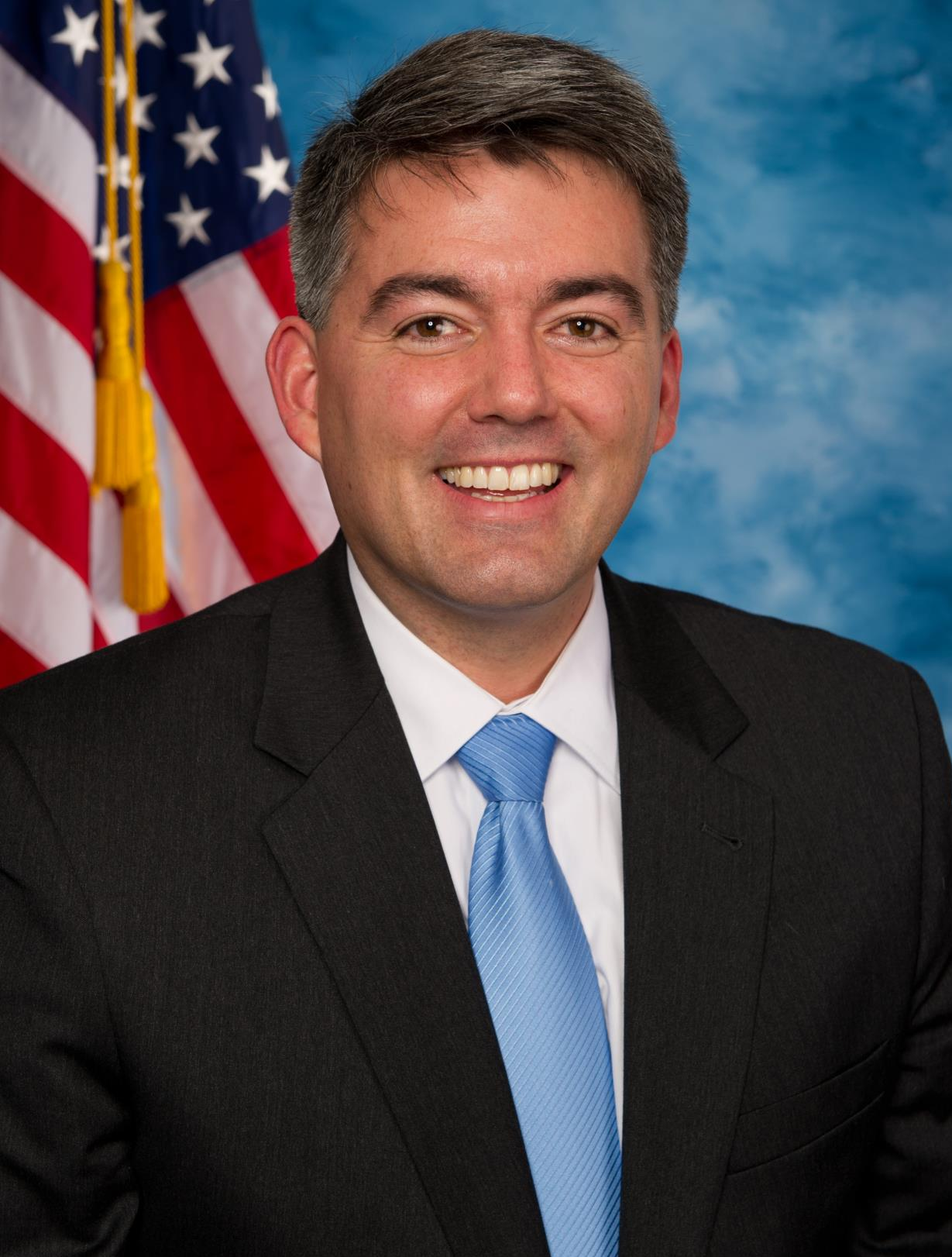

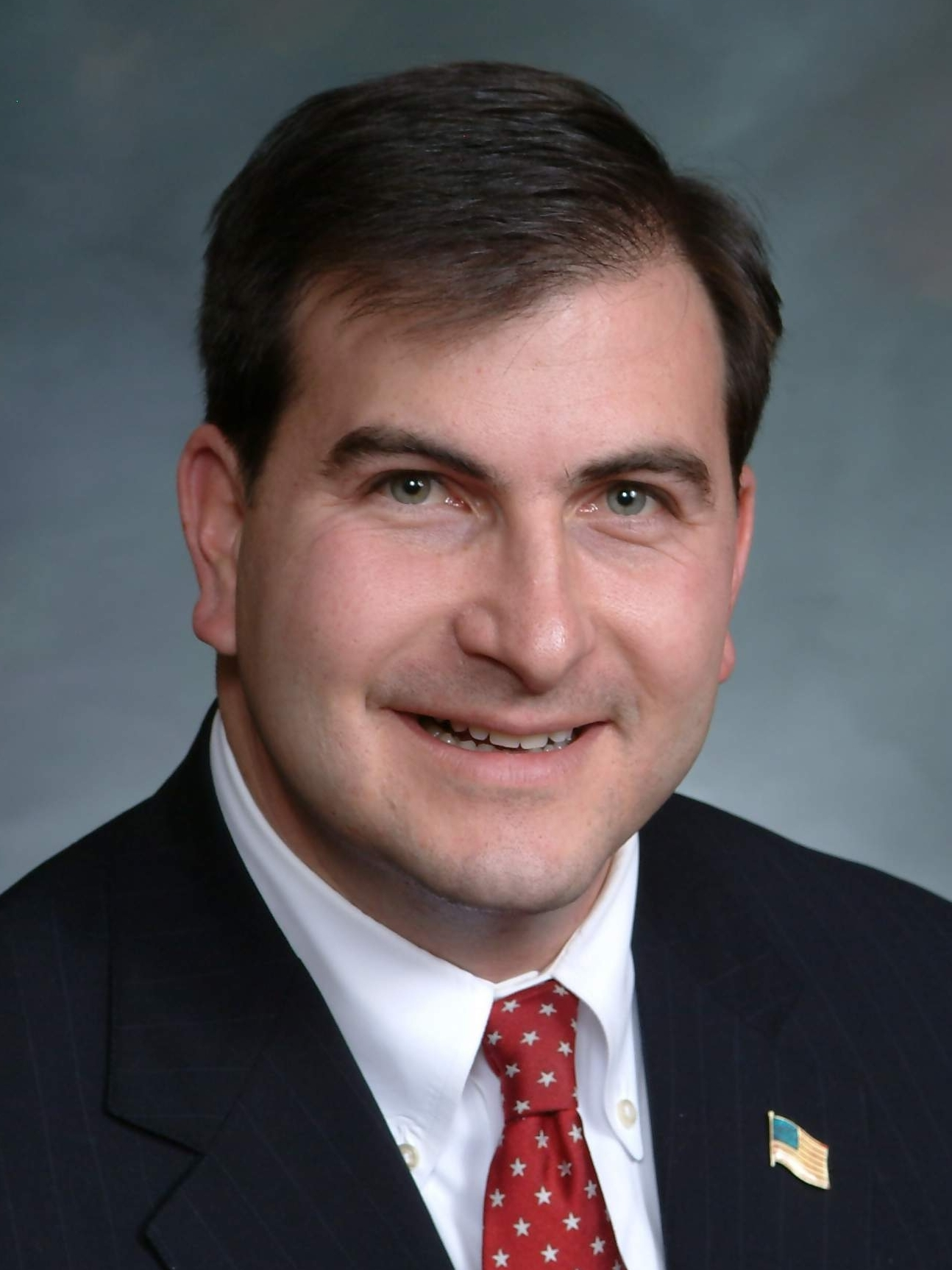
Nominee	Cory Gardner	Brandon Shaffer
Party	Republican	Democratic
Popular vote	200,006	125,800
Percentage	58.4%	36.8%
- County results Gardner: 50–60% 60–70% 70–80% 80–90% Shaffer: 50–60%
U.S. Representative before election
Cory Gardner
Republican
Elected U.S. Representative
Cory Gardner
Republican

After redistricting, Colorado's 4th congressional district continued to strongly favor Republicans. It lost Fort Collins to the 2nd District; as a result, the largest city in the district is now Greeley. Republican incumbent Cory Gardner, who was first elected to represent Colorado's 4th congressional district in 2010, raised over $300,000 in the first quarter of 2011.

=== Republican primary ===
==== Candidates ====
===== Nominee =====
- Cory Gardner, incumbent U.S. representative

==== Primary results ====
Republican primary results
Party	Candidate	Votes	%
Republican	Cory Gardner (incumbent)	49,340	100.0
Total votes		49,340	100.0

=== Democratic primary ===
==== Candidates ====
===== Nominee =====
- Brandon Shaffer, president of the Colorado Senate

===== Declined =====
- Betsy Markey, assistant secretary for intergovernmental affairs in the U.S. Department of Homeland Security and former U.S. representative

==== Primary results ====
Democratic primary results
Party	Candidate	Votes	%
Democratic	Brandon Shaffer	20,671	100.0
Total votes		20,671	100.0

=== Constitution primary ===
==== Primary results ====
Constitution primary results
Party	Candidate	Votes	%
Constitution	Doug Aden	118	100.0
Total votes		118	100.0

=== General election ===
==== Endorsements ====
Cory Gardner (R)

Organizations

- Campaign for Working Families
- Gun Owners of America
- National Right to Life Committee
- NRA Political Victory Fund
- United States Chamber of Commerce

Newspapers

- The Denver Post
Brandon Shaffer (D)

Labor unions

- International Brotherhood of Boilermakers
- National Association of Letter Carriers
- National Education Association
- United Steelworkers

Organizations

- NARAL Pro-Choice America
- Planned Parenthood Action Fund

==== Polling ====
Poll source	Date(s) administered	Sample size	Margin of error	Cory Gardner (R)	Brandon Shaffer (D)	Undecided
Lauer Johnson Research (D-Schaffer)	July 29–31, 2012	400	±?%	42%	35%	21%

==== Predictions ====
Source	Ranking	As of
The Cook Political Report	Safe R	November 5, 2012
Rothenberg	Safe R	November 2, 2012
Roll Call	Safe R	November 4, 2012
Sabato's Crystal Ball	Safe R	November 5, 2012
NY Times	Safe R	November 4, 2012
RCP	Safe R	November 4, 2012
The Hill	Safe R	November 4, 2012

==== Results ====
Colorado's 4th congressional district, 2012
Party	Candidate	Votes	%
Republican	Cory Gardner (incumbent)	200,006	58.4
Democratic	Brandon Shaffer	125,800	36.8
Libertarian	Josh Gilliland	10,682	3.1
Constitution	Doug Aden	5,848	1.7
Total votes		342,336	100.0
Republican hold			

== District 5 ==
2012 Colorado's 5th congressional district election
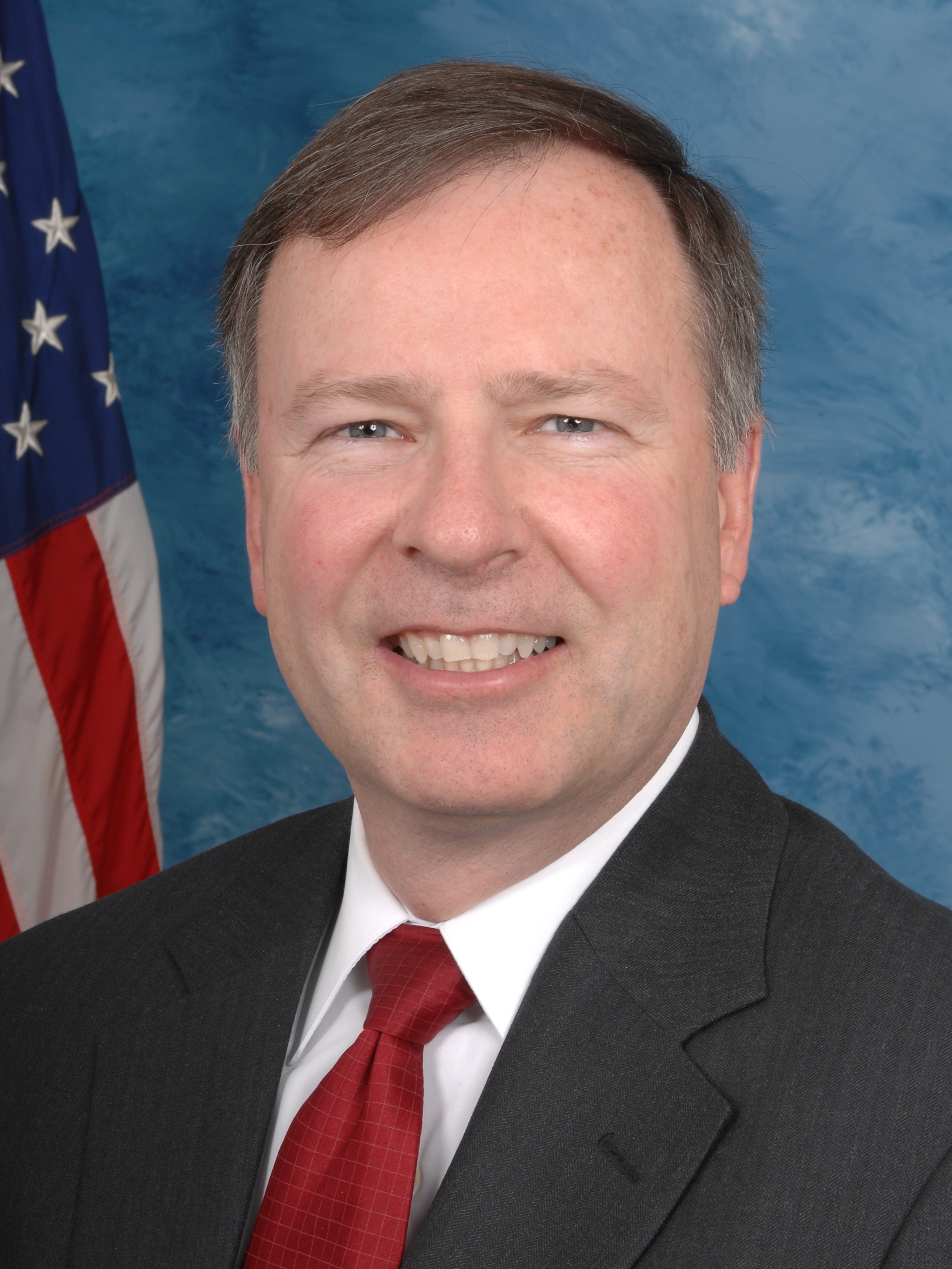

Nominee	Doug Lamborn	Dave Anderson
Party	Republican	Independent
Popular vote	199,639	53,318
Percentage	65.0%	17.3%
Nominee	Jim Pirtle	Misha Luzov
Party	Libertarian	Green
Popular vote	22,778	18,284
Percentage	7.4%	6.0%
- County results Lamborn: 50–60% 60–70% 70–80%
U.S. Representative before election
Doug Lamborn
Republican
Elected U.S. Representative
Doug Lamborn
Republican

Colorado's 5th congressional district, which had been represented by Republican Doug Lamborn since 2007, was not significantly modified in redistricting and is still centered in Colorado Springs. It is expected to continue to strongly favor Republicans.

=== Republican primary ===
==== Candidates ====
===== Nominee =====
- Doug Lamborn, incumbent U.S. representative

===== Eliminated in primary =====
- Doug Bergeron, insurance agent
- Robert Blaha, businessman

==== Primary results ====
Republican primary results
Party	Candidate	Votes	%
Republican	Doug Lamborn (incumbent)	43,929	61.7
Republican	Robert Blaha	27,245	38.3
Total votes		71,174	100.0

=== Democratic primary ===
==== Candidates ====
===== Withdrawn =====
- Bob Evans

=== Constitution primary ===
==== Primary results ====
Constitution primary results
Party	Candidate	Votes	%
Constitution	Kenneth R. Harvell	129	100.0
Total votes		129	100.0

=== General election ===
The Republican candidate did not see a Democratic challenger, as Democratic candidate Bob Evans suspended his campaign.

However, Jim Pirtle (Libertarian), Kenneth R. Harvell (American Constitution), and Dave Anderson (no party affiliation) all challenged the Republican Party nominee.

==== Endorsements ====
Doug Lamborn (R)

Organizations

- Campaign for Working Families
- Eagle Forum
- Gun Owners of America
- National Right to Life Committee
- NRA Political Victory Fund
- United States Chamber of Commerce

Newspapers

- The Denver Post

==== Predictions ====
Source	Ranking	As of
The Cook Political Report	Safe R	November 5, 2012
Rothenberg	Safe R	November 2, 2012
Roll Call	Safe R	November 4, 2012
Sabato's Crystal Ball	Safe R	November 5, 2012
NY Times	Safe R	November 4, 2012
RCP	Safe R	November 4, 2012
The Hill	Safe R	November 4, 2012

==== Results ====
Colorado's 5th congressional district, 2012
Party	Candidate	Votes	%
Republican	Doug Lamborn (incumbent)	199,639	65.0
Independent	Dave Anderson	53,318	17.3
Libertarian	Jim Pirtle	22,778	7.4
Green	Misha Luzov	18,284	6.0
Constitution	Kenneth R. Harvell	13,212	4.3
Total votes		307,231	100.0
Republican hold			

== District 6 ==
2012 Colorado's 6th congressional district election
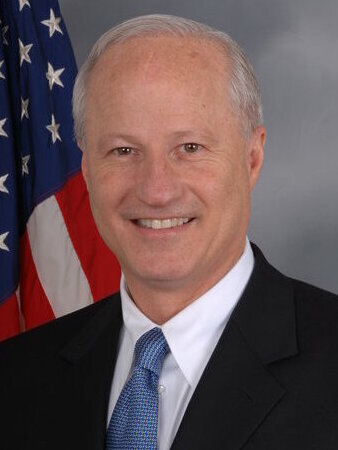

Nominee	Mike Coffman	Joe Miklosi
Party	Republican	Democratic
Popular vote	163,938	156,937
Percentage	47.8%	45.8%
- County results Coffman: 40–50% 50–60% Miklosi: 40–50%
U.S. Representative before election
Mike Coffman
Republican
Elected U.S. Representative
Mike Coffman
Republican

In redistricting, Colorado's 6th congressional district was made more favorable to Democrats. While the 6th had leaned Republican since its creation in 1983, the new 6th's population was evenly split between Democrats, Republicans and unaffiliated voters. All of Aurora was added to the district. Republican Mike Coffman had represented the 6th district since 2009.

=== Republican primary ===
==== Candidates ====
===== Nominee =====
- Mike Coffman, incumbent U.S. representative

==== Primary results ====
Republican primary results
Party	Candidate	Votes	%
Republican	Mike Coffman (incumbent)	35,271	100.0
Total votes		35,271	100.0

=== Democratic primary ===
==== Candidates ====
===== Nominee =====
- Joe Miklosi, state representative

===== Withdrawn =====
- Perry Haney, chiropractor

===== Declined =====
- Morgan Carroll, state senator
- John Morse, majority leader of the state senate
- Andrew Romanoff, former speaker of the Colorado House of Representatives
- Brandon Shaffer, president of the Colorado Senate (running in the 4th district)

==== Primary results ====
Democratic primary results
Party	Candidate	Votes	%
Democratic	Joe Miklosi	22,938	100.0
Total votes		22,938	100.0

=== General election ===
==== Endorsements ====
Mike Coffman (R)

Organizations

- National Republican Congressional Committee "Patriot" Program
- National Right to Life Committee
- NRA Political Victory Fund
- United States Chamber of Commerce

Newspapers

- The Denver Post
Joe Miklosi (D)

Labor unions

- International Brotherhood of Boilermakers
- National Association of Letter Carriers
- National Education Association
- United Steelworkers

Organizations

- Council for a Livable World
- Democracy for America
- Democratic Congressional Campaign Committee "Red to Blue" Program
- Human Rights Campaign
- League of Conservation Voters
- NARAL Pro-Choice America
- Planned Parenthood Action Fund
- Progressive Change Campaign Committee
- Sierra Club

==== Polling ====
Poll source	Date(s) administered	Sample size	Margin of error	Mike Coffman (R)	Joe Miklosi (D)	Undecided
DCCC (D)	September 13, 2012	350	±5.2%	42%	39%	19%

==== Predictions ====
Source	Ranking	As of
The Cook Political Report	Tossup	November 5, 2012
Rothenberg	Tilt R	November 2, 2012
Roll Call	Tossup	November 4, 2012
Sabato's Crystal Ball	Lean R	November 5, 2012
NY Times	Lean R	November 4, 2012
RCP	Tossup	November 4, 2012
The Hill	Tossup	November 4, 2012

==== Results ====
Colorado's 6th congressional district, 2012
Party	Candidate	Votes	%
Republican	Mike Coffman (incumbent)	163,938	47.8
Democratic	Joe Miklosi	156,937	45.8
Independent	Kathy Polhemus	13,442	3.9
Libertarian	Patrick E. Provost	8,597	2.5
Total votes		342,914	100.0
Republican hold			

== District 7 ==
2012 Colorado's 7th congressional district election
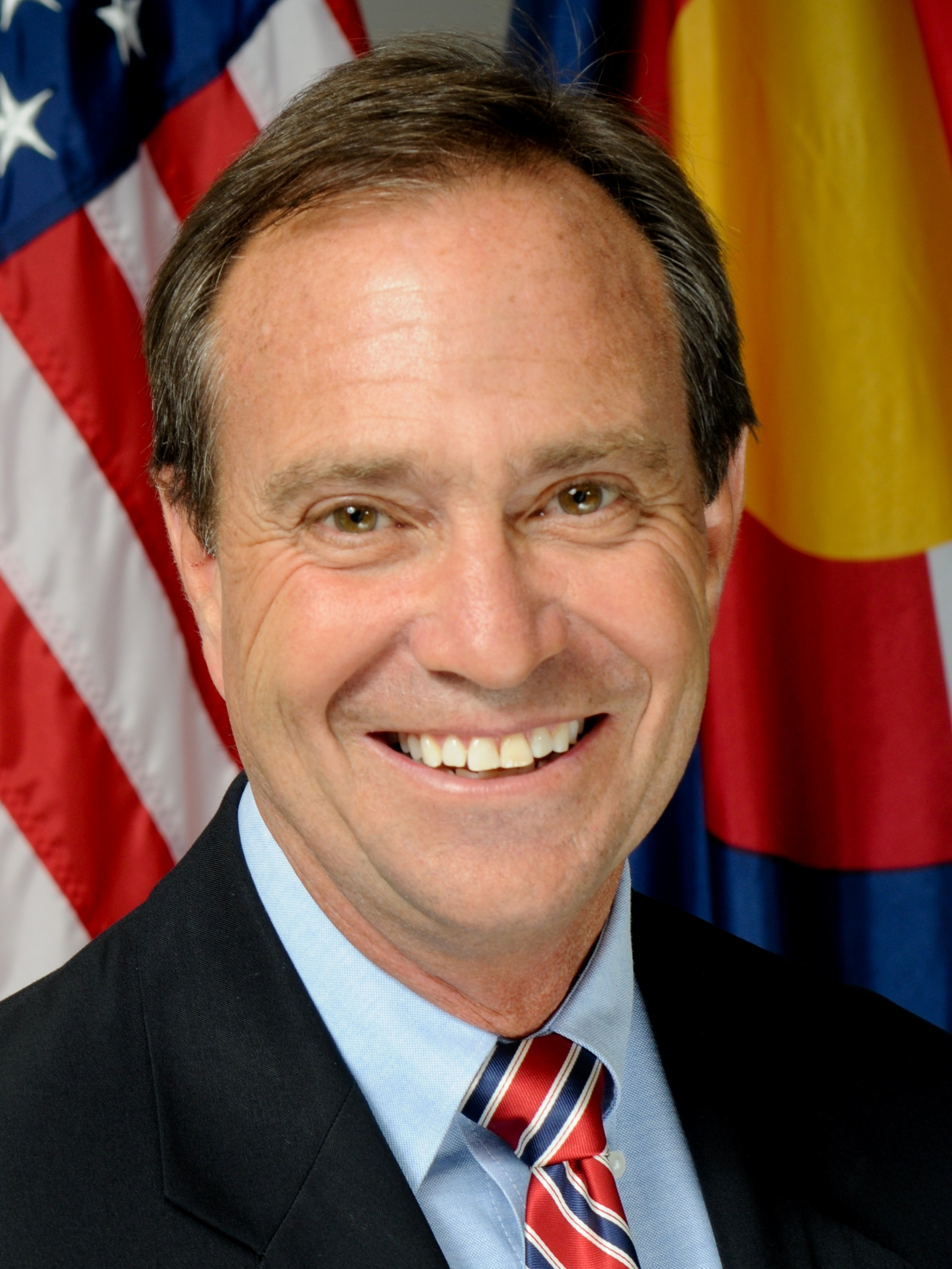

Nominee	Ed Perlmutter	Joe Coors
Party	Democratic	Republican
Popular vote	182,460	139,066
Percentage	53.5%	40.8%
- County results Perlmutter: 50–60%
U.S. Representative before election
Ed Perlmutter
Democratic
Elected U.S. Representative
Ed Perlmutter
Democratic

Colorado's 7th congressional district, which had been represented by Democrat Ed Perlmutter since 2007, was modified in redistricting to include the more populated suburbs of Adams County.

=== Democratic primary ===
==== Candidates ====
===== Nominee =====
- Ed Perlmutter, incumbent U.S. representative

==== Primary results ====
Democratic primary results
Party	Candidate	Votes	%
Democratic	Ed Perlmutter (incumbent)	29,987	100.0
Total votes		29,987	100.0

=== Republican primary ===
==== Candidates ====
===== Nominee =====
- Joe Coors Jr, brother of 2004 U.S. Senate candidate Pete Coors

==== Primary results ====
Republican primary results
Party	Candidate	Votes	%
Republican	Joe Coors	31,254	100.0
Total votes		31,254	100.0

=== Constitution primary ===
==== Primary results ====
Constitution primary results
Party	Candidate	Votes	%
Constitution	Douglas "Dayhorse" Campbell	79	100.0
Total votes		79	100.0

=== General election ===
==== Endorsements ====
Ed Perlmutter (D)

Labor unions

- International Brotherhood of Boilermakers
- National Association of Letter Carriers
- National Education Association
- United Steelworkers

Organizations

- Human Rights Campaign
- Humane Society of the United States
- NARAL Pro-Choice America
- Planned Parenthood Action Fund
- Sierra Club

Newspapers

- The Denver Post
Joe Coors Jr (R)

Organizations

- Gun Owners of America
- National Republican Congressional Committee "Young Guns" Program
- National Right to Life Committee
- NRA Political Victory Fund
- United States Chamber of Commerce

==== Debates ====
- Complete video of debate, October 8, 2012

==== Polling ====
Poll source	Date(s) administered	Sample size	Margin of error	Ed Perlmutter (D)	Joe Coors Jr (R)	Buck Bailey (L)	Doug Campbell (C)	Undecided
OnMessage (R-Coors)	July 16–17, 2012	400	±4.9%	36%	45%	2%	3%	14%

==== Predictions ====
Source	Ranking	As of
The Cook Political Report	Lean D	November 5, 2012
Rothenberg	Lean D	November 2, 2012
Roll Call	Likely D	November 4, 2012
Sabato's Crystal Ball	Likely D	November 5, 2012
NY Times	Safe D	November 4, 2012
RCP	Lean D	November 4, 2012
The Hill	Safe D	November 4, 2012

==== Results ====
Colorado's 7th congressional district, 2012
Party	Candidate	Votes	%
Democratic	Ed Perlmutter (incumbent)	182,460	53.5
Republican	Joe Coors	139,066	40.8
Constitution	Dayhorse Campbel	10,296	3.0
Libertarian	Buck Bailey	9,148	2.7
Total votes		340,970	100.0
Democratic hold			
