= Dorothy Butcher =

American politician (born 1943)

Member of the Colorado House of Representatives from the 46th district
- In office January 8, 2003 – January 7, 2009
- Preceded by: Abel Tapia
- Succeeded by: Sal Pace

Personal details
- Born: 1943 (age 82–83) Pueblo, Colorado
- Party: Democratic
- Education: University of Southern Colorado
- Occupation: Nurse, fiscal analyst

Dorothy Butcher (born 1943) is a Democratic politician from Colorado who served as a member of the Colorado House of Representatives from the 46th district from 2003 to 2009.

== Early life ==
Butcher was born in Pueblo, Colorado, in 1943. She attended the University of Southern Colorado and was a nurse before working for Qwest. She served on the Pueblo City Council from 1977 to 1981, and was an unsuccessful candidate for the City Council in 1981 and 1983.

== Colorado House of Representatives ==
In 2002, State Representative Abel Tapia opted to run for the State Senate rather than seek re-election, Butcher ran to succeed him in the 46th district, which was based in Pueblo. In the Democratic primary, she faced Pueblo City Councilman Patrick Avalos, and defeated him with 55 percent of the vote. She was unopposed in the general election. Butcher was re-elected without opposition in 2004 and 2006. In 2005, Butcher was named the Majority Whip in the House.

== Pueblo County Commission campaign ==
In 2007, Butcher announced that she would run to succeed Pueblo County Commissioner Loretta Kennedy in the 2nd district in 2008. Later that year, after Kennedy resigned, Butcher sought to be appointed as Kennedy's successor. However, the County Democratic Party ultimately named retired traffic engineer John Cordova as Kennedy's successor over Butcher, with Cordova receiving 94 votes to Butcher's 70. Cordova ran for a full term in 2008, and Butcher announced that she would challenge him in the Democratic primary, and resigned from her position as Majority Whip to focus on her campaign. Cordova ultimately narrowly defeated her in the primary, receiving 50.5% of the vote to her 49.5%, and winning by a margin of 55 votes.
