= American Whitewater =

US advocacy group for whitewater rivers

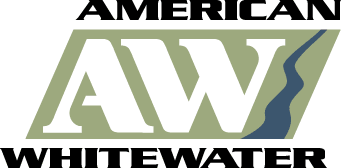
- Founded: 1954
- Type: Advocacy group
- Tax ID no.: 23-7083760
- Purpose: Environmentalism, Conservation, Recreation
- Location: Cullowhee, North Carolina, US
- Coordinates: 35°18′35″N 83°11′01″W
- Region served: United States
- Key people: President: Chris Bell; Vice President: Courtney Wilton
- Revenue: $1,197,774 (2012)
- Expenses: $1,111,428 (2012)
- Website: www.americanwhitewater.org

American Whitewater is a not-for-profit 501(c)3 membership organization with the declared mission "to conserve and restore America's whitewater resources and to enhance opportunities to enjoy them safely". The organization can broadly be classified as an advocacy group that engages in a variety of tactics to ensure rivers are accessible to those who wish to use them. This includes working on lobbying efforts at local and national levels as well as maintaining and publishing information about river conservation, statistics on river use, accident reports, and river sports safety.

== History ==
The organization was founded in 1954 as the American White Water Affiliation incorporated in 1961. Upon its founding, the organizational members set to advance four principal objectives. (1) Encourage the exploration, enjoyment, and preservation of America's recreational waterways for human-powered craft. (2) Protect the wilderness character of waterways through conservation of water, forests, parks, wildlife, and related resources. (3) Promote and celebrate safety, proficiency and responsibility in all aspects of whitewater activities such as the navigation of moving water, teaching, teamwork, leadership, and equipment design, by publishing and demonstrating our support for instructional development in these and related fields. (4) Promote appreciation and respect for the value of wilderness activity and whitewater sports. In 1997, the name was shortened to American Whitewater (AW).

The American Whitewater started publishing a journal in 1955. The American Whitewater Journal was considered the first whitewater magazine in the United States. Traditionally it consisted of stories, safety information, equipment information, and paddling technique instruction. In 2004 the association created a digital archive making the previous 50 years of journals available for online access.

== Major achievements ==
- Wild and Scenic Rivers Act: American Whitewater contributed many of the initial concepts for protection of Wisconsin's waterways that Senator Gaylord Nelson incorporated into the Wild and Scenic Rivers Act that was passed into law in 1968.
- Dam removal: American Whitewater has worked with a variety of organizations to further the cause of removing dams and restoring natural flows to riverways.
- Hydropower relicensing: American Whitewater was a founding member of the Hydropower Reform Coalition, an organization that represents public interests in hydropower relicensing.
- Access: In collaboration with The Access Fund, The American Canoe Association, The International Mountain Bicycling Association, and The Winter Wildlands Alliance, American Whitewater helped found the Outdoor Alliance, an advocacy organization that promotes public access to natural resources.

== Advocacy ==
American Whitewater opposed the Water Rights Protection Act, a bill that would prevent federal agencies from requiring certain entities to relinquish their water rights to the United States in order to use public lands. According to opponents, the bill is too broad. They believe the bill "could also block federal fisheries agencies like the United States Fish and Wildlife Service from requiring flows that help salmon find fish ladders and safely pass over dams." American Whitewater called the bill a "sneak attack designed to force federal agencies to put private uses of river water ahead of other beneficial public uses like fish, wildlife, and recreation."
