= Water Rights Protection Act =

- Long title: To prohibit the conditioning of any permit, lease, or other use agreement on the transfer, relinquishment, or other impairment of any water right to the United States by the Secretaries of the Interior and Agriculture.
- Announced in: the 113th United States Congress
- Sponsored by: Rep. Scott R. Tipton (R, CO-3)
- Number of co-sponsors: 4

Codification
- Agencies affected: United States Department of Agriculture, United States Department of the Interior

Legislative history
- Introduced in the House as H.R. 3189 by Rep. Scott R. Tipton (R, CO-3) on September 26, 2013; Committee consideration by United States House Committee on Natural Resources, United States House Committee on Agriculture, United States House Natural Resources Subcommittee on Water and Power, United States House Agriculture Subcommittee on Conservation, Energy, and Forestry

The Water Rights Protection Act (H.R. 3189) is a piece of environmental legislation that would prevent federal agencies from requiring certain entities to relinquish their water rights to the United States in order to use public lands.

The bill was originally introduced into the United States House of Representatives during the 113th United States Congress, and has been repeatedly reintroduced during subsequent congressional terms into both the House and the United States Senate. The legislation has been supported by the ski industry and agribusiness interests, but strongly opposed by environmental and conservation groups.

== Background ==
In 2012, a court ruled "in favor of the ski companies... that seizing the privately held water rights usurped state water law." However, the United States Forest Service decided to pursue a "new regulation to demand that water rights be transferred to the federal government as a condition for obtaining permits needed to operate 121 ski resorts that cross over federal lands."

== Provisions of the bill ==
This summary is based largely on the summary provided by the Congressional Research Service, a public domain source.

The Water Rights Protection Act would prohibit the Secretary of the Interior and the Secretary of Agriculture (USDA) from: (1) conditioning the issuance, renewal, amendment, or extension of any permit, approval, license, lease, allotment, easement, right-of-way, or other land use or occupancy agreement on the transfer of any water right directly to the United States, or any impairment in title, in whole or in part, granted or recognized under state law, by federal or state adjudication, decree, or other judgment, or pursuant to any interstate water compact; and (2) requiring any water user to apply for a water right in the name of the United States under state law as a condition of such a land use or occupancy agreement.

The bill would state that nothing in this Act limits or expands any existing authority of the Secretaries to condition any permit, approval, license, lease, allotment, easement, right-of-way, or other land use or occupancy agreement on federal lands subject to their respective jurisdictions.

== Congressional Budget Office report ==
This summary is based largely on the summary provided by the Congressional Budget Office, as ordered reported by the House Committee on Natural Resources on November 14, 2013. This is a public domain source.

H.R. 3189 would prevent federal agencies from requiring certain entities to relinquish their water rights to the United States in order to use public lands. Because Congressional Budget Office (CBO) expects that enacting the bill would not affect the number of users of public lands or the amount of receipts received by federal agencies for the use of those lands, we estimate that enacting the bill would have no impact on the federal budget. Enacting H.R. 3189 would not affect direct spending or revenues; therefore, pay-as-you-go procedures do not apply.

H.R. 3189 contains no intergovernmental or private-sector mandates as defined in the Unfunded Mandates Reform Act and would not affect the budgets of state, local, or tribal governments.

== Procedural history ==
Congress	Short title	Bill number(s)	Date introduced	Sponsor(s)	# of cosponsors	Latest status
113th Congress	Water Rights Protection Act	H.R. 3189	September 26, 2013	Scott Tipton (R-CO)	15	Passed House (238-174)
113th Congress	Water Rights Protection Act	S. 1630	October 31, 2013	John Barrasso (R-WY)	7	Died in committee
114th Congress	Water Rights Protection Act	H.R. 1830	April 16, 2015	Scott Tipton (R-CO)	26	Died in committee
114th Congress	Water Rights Protection Act	S. 982	April 16, 2015	John Barrasso (R-WY)	11	Died in committee
115th Congress	Water Rights Protection Act of 2017	H.R. 2939	June 20, 2017	Scott Tipton (R-CO)	12	Died in committee
115th Congress	Water Rights Protection Act of 2017	S. 1230	June 25, 2017	John Barrasso (R-WY)	8	Died in committee
116th Congress	Water Rights Protection Act of 2019	H.R. 579	January 15, 2019	Scott Tipton (R-CO)	10	Died in committee
117th Congress	Water Rights Protection Act of 2021	S. 855	March 18, 2021	John Barrasso (R-WY)	2	Referred to committee

The Water Rights Protection Act was introduced into the United States House of Representatives on September 26, 2013 by Rep. Scott R. Tipton (R, CO-3). The bill was referred to the United States House Committee on Natural Resources, the United States House Committee on Agriculture, the United States House Natural Resources Subcommittee on Water and Power, and the United States House Agriculture Subcommittee on Conservation, Energy, and Forestry. The bill was ordered reported (amended) by the Committee on Natural Resources on March 4, 2014 alongside House Report 113-372 Part 1. On March 7, 2014, House Majority Leader Eric Cantor announced that H.R. 3189 would be considered on March 12 or 13, 2014.

== Debate and discussion ==
The Colorado ski industry supported the bill because it believed the legislation was "needed to block a water extortion scheme by the Forest Service to withhold government permits unless the companies relinquish their valuable water rights." Vice President of the Aspen Skiing Company David Corbin testified to the House Natural Resources Subcommittee on Water and Power that the company would go out of business without the water.

Rep. Tipton, who sponsored the bill, said the bill was needed because it "provides critical protection for water rights' holders from federal takings by ensuring that federal government agencies cannot extort private property rights through uneven-handed negotiations." Tipton argued that the bill "prohibits federal agencies from pilfering water rights through the use of permits, leases, and other land management arrangements, for which it would otherwise have to pay just compensation under the 5th Amendment of the Constitution."

Rep. Tom McClintock (R-CA) also supported the bill, saying that the Forest Service's regulation "illustrates an increasingly hostile attitude by this agency toward those who make productive use of our vast national forests, in this case by enhancing and attracting the tourism upon which our mountain communities depend."

Rep. Jared Huffman (D-CA) accused the House Natural Resources Subcommittee on Water and Power of being unnecessarily "adversarial" and having "unfairly vilified" the Forest Service after a committee hearing about the bill.

The Public Lands Council and the National Cattlemen's Beef Association both supported the bill and urged supporters to contact their representatives and encourage them to vote in favor of the bill.

The bill was opposed by groups likes the Sierra Club, the Natural Resources Defense Council, and the National Parks Conservation Association. Over 60 "conservation, sportsman, and recreation groups" opposed the bill. According to opponents, the bill is too broad. They believe the bill "could also block federal fisheries agencies like the United States Fish and Wildlife Service from requiring flows that help salmon find fish ladders and safely pass over dams."

American Whitewater opposed the bill, calling it a "sneak attack designed to force federal agencies to put private uses of river water ahead of other beneficial public uses like fish, wildlife, and recreation."

== See also ==
- List of bills in the 113th United States Congress
