= Abel Tapia =

American politician

Abel J. Tapia
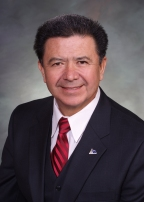

Member of the Colorado Senate from the 3rd district
- In office January 11, 2003 – August 1, 2010
- Preceded by: Bill Thiebaut
- Succeeded by: Angela Giron

Member of the Colorado House of Representatives from the 46th district
- In office January 13, 1999 – January 11, 2003
- Preceded by: Gilbert E. Romero
- Succeeded by: Dorothy Butcher

Personal details
- Born: July 23, 1949 (age 77) Pueblo, Colorado
- Party: Democratic
- Profession: Engineer

Abel J. Tapia is an American politician who served as a member of the Colorado House of Representatives from 1999 to 2003 and the Colorado Senate from 2003 to 2010. Tapia left the Senate when he was appointed director of the Colorado Lottery.

== Career ==
Prior to his time in the General Assembly, Tapia served as elected member of the District-60 school board and as the President of the Greater Pueblo Chamber of Commerce.

On March 28, 2014, Tapia announced his candidacy for Colorado's 3rd congressional district of the United States House of Representatives. He was defeated by Republican incumbent Scott Tipton.

In 2020, Tapia was a candidate for the Pueblo County Commission, running on a platform of COVID-19 economy recovery, improving Pueblo's existing jail, supporting small businesses. However, he was defeated in the June 2020 primary election by incumbent Garrison Ortiz.
