= Dick Wadhams =

American political consultant

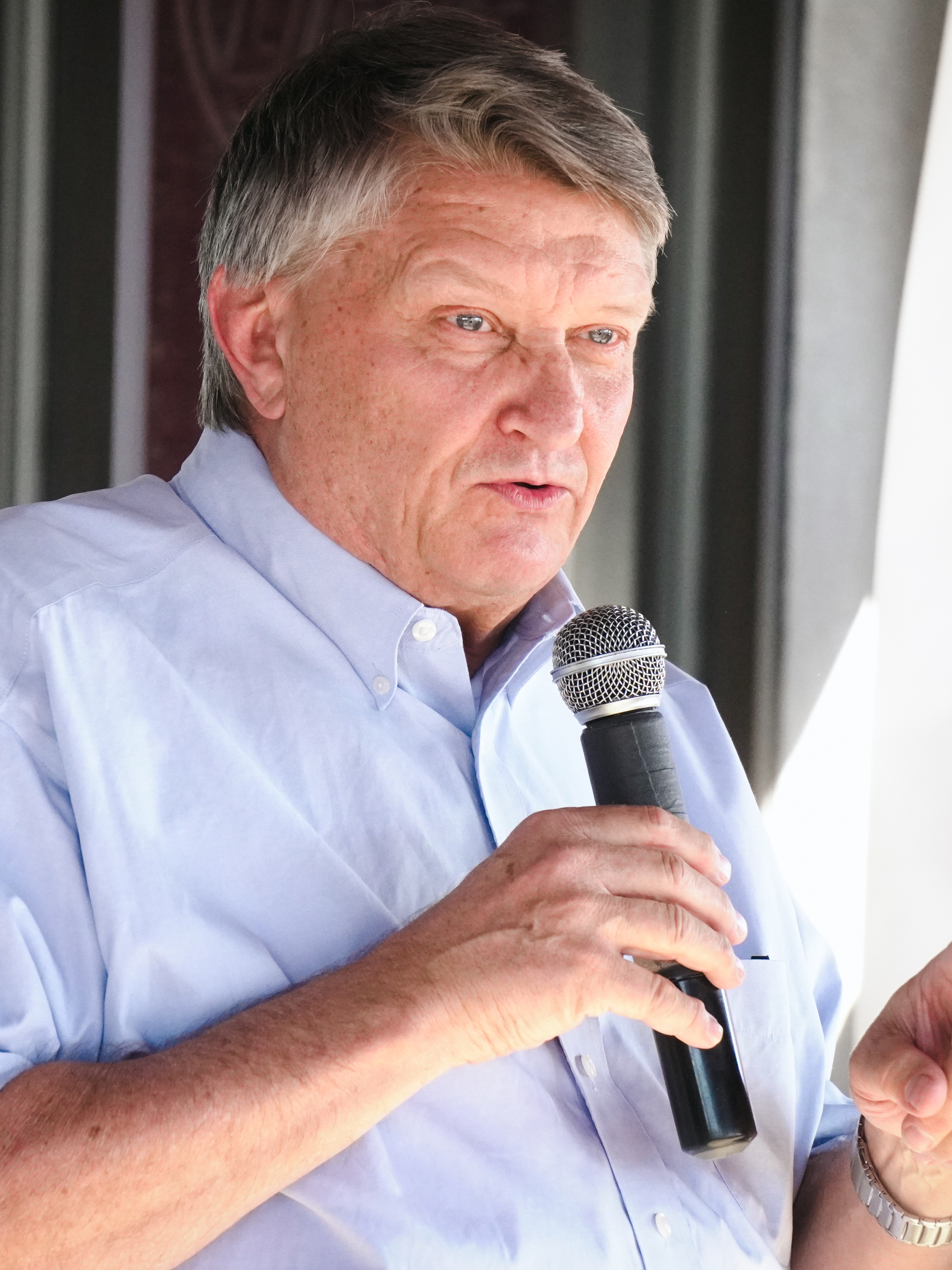

Chair of the Colorado Republican Party
- In office 2007–2011
- Succeeded by: Ryan Call

Personal details
- Born: Richard Wadhams; August 26, 1955 (age 70) Las Animas, Colorado, U.S.
- Party: Republican
- Education: Colorado State University Pueblo (BA)

Richard "Dick" Wadhams (born August 26, 1955) is an American Republican political consultant, known for his role in guiding John Thune to an upset victory over then-United States Senate Minority Leader Tom Daschle. He also worked for former Virginia senator George Allen, former Colorado Senator Wayne Allard, former Colorado governor Bill Owens and former Montana senator Conrad Burns.

Wadhams is a longtime friend of Karl Rove. The two met during their days together in the College Republicans, and Slate Magazine and others speculated that Wadhams was Rove's heir apparent.

== Early life and education ==
Wadhams was born and raised in Las Animas, Colorado. He earned a Bachelor of Arts degree in political science from Colorado State University Pueblo. During college, Wadhams worked at a mortuary.

== Career ==
Wadhams was elected chair of the Colorado Republican Party in March 2007 hoping to stem the losses that party has suffered in the last two elections. In 2008, he was hired by Republican U.S. Senate candidate Bob Schaffer to help manage Schaffer's campaign, while continuing to serve as chair the Colorado Republican Party. He was reelected in 2009 by a strong majority, capturing 310 of the 366 votes cast.

When Wadhams was elected, the Colorado Republican Party had incurred mounting debts from the 2002, 2004, and 2006 elections, totaling over $580,000. By 2008, the Colorado Republican Party had paid off its debts, mainly through individual donations.

In November 2008, Bob Schaffer lost to Mark Udall in the campaign to replace Wayne Allard's seat in the United States Senate. In addition, Republican losses across Colorado were widespread, with Colorado voting to elect Barack Obama as President and the Democrats retaining power in both houses of the state legislature, although Republicans were able to add seats in the state legislature.

Wadhams blamed Republican losses on several obstacles including Barack Obama’s charisma, the unpopularity of President George W. Bush, and the 2008 financial crisis, which was blamed on Republicans who had supported deregulation in the name of free enterprise.

Some critics have attacked Wadhams for playing a dual role during the 2008 election as party chairman and Bob Schaffer's campaign manager. However, during the 2008 election, under Wadham's leadership, the Colorado Republican Party was "hailed for its voter turnout" and recognized by the RNC. The state GOP increased its outreach by topping the 2004 effort by more than 95 percent.

Wadhams was reelected as state chairman at the 2009 Colorado Republican Organization Meeting. He left the position in 2011.
