= Sal Pace =

American politician

Salvatore "Sal" Pace

Member of the Colorado House of Representatives from the 46th district
- In office January 7, 2009 – November 6, 2012
- Preceded by: Dorothy Butcher
- Succeeded by: Leroy Garcia

Personal details
- Born: December 14, 1976 (age 49) New London, Connecticut
- Party: Democratic
- Spouse: Marlene Valdez Pace (dec)
- Education: Williston Northampton School, Fort Lewis College (BA), Louisiana State University (MA)

Sal Pace (born December 14, 1976) is an American politician, General Manager of the Front Range Passenger Rail District, professional ultimate frisbee team franchise owner and drug reform pioneer who served as a member of the Colorado House of Representatives, where he represented House District 46, which includes western Pueblo, Colorado from 2008 to 2012. During his time at the state house, Pace served as the Colorado House minority leader. He also served as a County Commissioner of Pueblo County, Colorado until 2019.

== Early life and education ==
Pace, the youngest of nine children, grew up in Essex, Connecticut and graduated from Williston Northampton School in 1995. He moved to Colorado when he was 18 to attend Fort Lewis College. He attended Louisiana State University, earning a master's degree in American political theory..

== General Manager Front Range Passenger Rail District ==
Pace is the General Manager of the Front Range Passenger Rail District (FRPRD), a political subdivision of the State of Colorado responsible for planning and developing passenger rail service along Colorado's Front Range. Appointed in 2025, Pace oversees the District's efforts to advance the Colorado Connector (CoCo) passenger rail program, including service planning, stakeholder engagement, funding strategies, and coordination with local governments, freight railroads, and state agencies.

== Political Career ==
Pace taught American government at Pueblo Community College and Colorado State University–Pueblo.

Pace served as a legislative aide to John Salazar in the Colorado House of Representatives, where he worked on water and health care legislation. When Salazar was elected to the U.S. House of Representatives, Pace continued to work for him as a District Director, Congressional staffer, and as the manager of Salazar's 2006 re-election campaign.

Pace was elected to the Colorado House of Representatives in 2008 and served until 2012. During his time in the house, Pace advocated for statewide marijuana legalization. In 2012, recreational marijuana use was legalized through Colorado Amendment 64. Pace had drafted and sponsored several bills related to marijuana policy and has been credited with transforming Pueblo County, Colorado into the "Napa Valley of cannabis." Since leaving the State House, Pace continued to specialize in marijuana policy on the county level. Pace serves on the national board of the Marijuana Policy Project, which advocates for liberalizing marijuana laws within states.

After the 2018 Colorado gubernatorial election, Pace was selected to serve as a co-chair on Governor-elect Jared Polis' transition team.

=== 2012 Congressional election ===
Pace's race was touted as a primary example by Time Magazine of the role that so-called SuperPacs can play in winning an election. Having gotten close in the polls near October 1, the GOP money machine targeted the seat. Without Democrats matching, Pace ultimately lost.

In the 2012 general election, Pace faced Republican Congressman Scott Tipton. Tipton won by a margin of 53% to 41%, with the remainder of the vote going to third-party candidates.

=== Pueblo County Commission ===
From 2013 until 2019, Pace served as a County Commissioner of Pueblo County, Colorado. As one of three commissioners, each elected county-wide, he represented the 165,000 residents of Pueblo County.

Pace has been an advocate for passenger rail in Colorado. He chaired the Southwest Chief Passenger Rail Commission while serving as a County Commissioner. In 2016, Pace received the highest national recognition from Amtrak, the President's Safety and Service Award.

== Personal life ==
Pace is a co-owner of the Colorado Apex, a Colorado-based professional ultimate frisbee organization and youth sports development program.

Pace is widowed and has three children.
