= 1866 Colorado territorial delegate election =

Colorado Election

In 1866 the Territory of Colorado held an election for the delegate to congress with inconclusive results. George M. Chilcott was sworn in after being nominated by the leading republic party in the territory and the canvassing board certifying that he won the majority of the votes. However, Governor Alexander Cummings denied the authority the of board and declared Alexander Cameron Hunt the winner.

The Territory of Colorado held an election in 1866 to determine whom to observe the proceedings of the United States Congress. United States Territories do not get voting representation in congress. Colorado was a one party, republican, territory at the time. The end to the American Civil War had brought several divisive political issues to Colorado. The chief among them was when and how to become a state. Alexander Cummings was a governor appointed by War Democrat Andrew Johnson. Cummings believed it was not the right time for statehood. However, republican Secretary of the Territory of Colorado, Samuel Hitt Elbert supported statehood along with a majority of Denver citizens. Cummings exacerbated the dispute by advocating for the rights of colored people, an unpopular position in Colorado at the time. Political division between Golden and Denver grew through the 1866 election for the territorial delegate. The republicans, which were most dominant in Denver, nominated George M. Chilcott. Prior to the campaign, Chilcott was the territory's official land registrar. Both men campaigned and gave speeches. Prior to the election the canvassing board, which was expected to oversee the election, consisted of Elbert, Hunt, and Frank Hall. Hunt recused himself and John Wanless was appointed. The board was audited by Richard Whitsitt. Cummings supported Alexander Cameron Hunt, of Golden, to be the territorial delegate. The county clerks and territorial canvassing board certified Chilcott as the winner by 108 votes. However, Cummings denied the authority of the territorial election board. The territorial law authorized the board to oversee the election of "all territorial officers", but Cummings argued that the delegate was not a territorial officer because his salary was paid by the US congress. Thus the law did not prescribe how to conduct the election and the election should be orchestrated by Governor Cummings. He counted the results himself and declared Hunt the winner with a 87-vote lead. A mob threatened to lynch Cummings and he moved to Golden. The United States Congress did not recognize anyone as the duly elected delegate for the territory, but Chilcott was sworn in as delegate and Hunt was informed he would be allowed to contest in federal court. Hunt did not contest.

== Sources ==
- Hanchett, William (April 1957). ""His Turbulent Excellency," Alexander Cummings, Governor of Colorado Territory, 1865-1867" (PDF). The Colorado Magazine. XXXIV (2): 81–104.
- Stone, Wilbur Fisk (1911). History of Colorado. The Western Press Bureau Company.
