= Colorado Territory's at-large congressional district =

Former congressional district

Coordinates: 39°00′N 105°30′W

- Obsolete district
- Created: 1861, as a non-voting delegate was granted by Congress
- Eliminated: 1876, as a result of statehood
- Years active: 1861–1876

The Territory of Colorado was represented by one non-voting delegate at-large to the United States House of Representatives from its organization in 1861, until statehood in 1876.

== List of delegates representing the district ==
Delegate	Party	Years	Cong ress	Electoral history
District created August 19, 1861
Hiram Pitt Bennet (Denver)	Conservative Republican	August 19, 1861 – March 3, 1865	37th 38th	Elected in 1861. Re-elected in 1862. Retired.
Allen Alexander Bradford (Denver)	Republican	March 4, 1865 – March 3, 1867	39th	Elected in 1864. Retired.
George Miles Chilcott (Excelsior)	Independent Republican	March 4, 1867 – March 3, 1869	40th	Elected in 1866. Retired.
Allen Alexander Bradford (Pueblo)	Republican	March 4, 1869 – March 3, 1871	41st	Elected in 1868. Retired.
Jerome Bunty Chaffee (Denver)	Republican	March 4, 1871 – March 3, 1875	42nd 43rd	Elected in 1870. Re-elected in 1872. Retired.
Thomas MacDonald Patterson (Denver)	Democratic	March 4, 1875 – August 1, 1876	44th	Elected in 1874. Ran for member from Colorado.
District eliminated August 1, 1876 upon Colorado's admission to the Union.

== Statehood ==
Upon admission to the Union in 1876, the State of Colorado was entitled to full representation in the United States Congress. See Colorado's congressional delegations and Colorado's congressional districts.

== See also ==
- Colorado's congressional delegations
- List of United States representatives from Colorado
- List of United States senators from Colorado
