= Alexander Cummings (territorial governor) =

American newspaper publisher and third governor of the Territory of Colorado

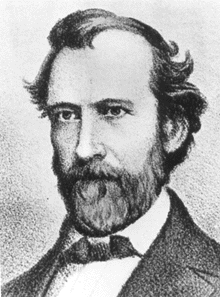

3rd Governor of the Territory of Colorado
- In office 1865–1867
- Preceded by: John Evans
- Succeeded by: Alexander Cameron Hunt

Personal details
- Born: November 17, 1810 Williamsport, Pennsylvania, U.S.
- Died: July 16, 1879 (aged 68) Ottawa, Ontario, Canada
- Resting place: Laurel Hill Cemetery, Philadelphia, Pennsylvania, U.S.
- Party: Republican

Military service
- Allegiance: United States
- Branch/service: Union Army
- Rank: Colonel; Bvt. Brigadier General
- Commands: 19th Pennsylvania Cavalry
- Battles/wars: American Civil War

Alexander Cummings (November 17, 1810 – July 16, 1879) was an American newspaper publisher and Republican politician from Pennsylvania who served as the third governor of the Territory of Colorado from 1865 to 1867. He was opposed to Colorado statehood and his term was contentious and riddled with controversy between pro-state and anti-state factions.

He published the Philadelphia North American, the Philadelphia Evening Bulletin and the New York World newspapers. He worked as a special purchasing agent for the United States War Department during the American Civil War but was removed due to profiteering. He recruited the Nineteenth Regiment of Pennsylvania Volunteer Cavalry and served as Colonel. He served as Superintendent of Troops of African Descent for the State of Arkansas and was brevetted Brigadier General for meritorious service. He worked as collector of internal revenue for the Fourth District of Pennsylvania and as U.S. Consul to the Kingdom of Hawaii.

== Early life and newspaper publishing ==
Cummings was born in Williamsport, Pennsylvania, on November 11, 1810. He worked as a printer and in 1845 purchased a half interest in the Philadelphia North American newspaper. In 1847, he sold his half interest and published the first issue of Cummings' Evening Telegraphic Bulletin which evolved into the Philadelphia Evening Bulletin. He remained publisher of the Bulletin until 1859 and then founded the New York World. The World operated as a semi-religious newspaper but did not prosper under Cummings and in 1862 came under control of other owners who dropped the religious character and changed the politics from Republican to Democratic. It was through the newspaper work that Cummings became associated with Simon Cameron who would become the Secretary of War under President Lincoln during the American Civil War.

== American civil war ==
At the beginning of the American Civil War, Cummings used his political influence with Cameron to be appointed as a special purchasing agent for the War Department. He was assigned to expediting the defense of Washington D.C. which included arranging railroad transportation of troops and purchasing supplies. Cummings wasted much of his $2,000,000 budget on overpriced purchases that were never used by troops. He arranged for the purchase of 790 Halls carbines which the military had previously ruled as dangerous and obsolete. The U.S. government sold them for $3.50 each and Cummings purchased them back at $15 each. He also arranged the purchase of 1,670 dozen straw hats and 19,680 pairs of linen pants that were subsequently ruled out of uniform. A committee on contracts assigned by the United States House of Representatives investigated Cummings financial expenditures and were never able to account for $140,000. On April 30, 1862, the House of Representatives passed a resolution which stated:

"Resolved. That Simon Cameron, late Secretary of War by investing Alexander Cummings with control of large sums of the public money...has adopted a policy highly injurious to the public service, and deserves the censure of the House."

He was discharged for profiteering and his political enemies labeled him with the nickname "Old Straw Hat".

After leaving the War Department, Cummings recruited the Nineteenth Regiment of Pennsylvania Volunteer Cavalry and became Colonel in October 1863. The regiment saw action in Tennessee and Mississippi in 1864 but Cummings was not in command. In February 1864, Cummings was made Superintendent of Troops of African Descent for the State of Arkansas. Cummings organized one colored battery of light artillery and five regiments of colored infantry. He was brevetted to the rank of Brigadier General by President Andrew Johnson for meritorious service.

== Colorado territorial governor ==
President Johnson appointed Cummings the new governor of the Territory of Colorado on October 17, 1865, to replace John Evans who resigned following the Sand Creek Massacre. Many of Evans' colleagues resented the forced change in leadership and opposed the new territorial Governor. Cummings was opposed to Colorado statehood and when he entered office, Colorado had already voted in favor of statehood and elected a state legislature and new governor in anticipation of a quick approval from Congress. The newly elected "state" legislature met in December 1865 and elected John Evans and Jerome B. Chaffee as U.S. Senators. Cummings publicly refuted the authority of the "state" legislature and declared that the territorial government was the only legal government in Colorado. Colorado citizens were forced to take sides between pro-state and anti-state factions and the legitimacy of Cummings' authority. President Johnson vetoed Colorado admission to statehood as the "state" constitution allowed only white males older than twenty-one the right to vote.

Cummings had a bitter feud with the territorial government second in command, pro-state Secretary of the Colorado Territory, Samuel Hitt Elbert. Cummings was not satisfied with the quality and location of the territorial offices and accused Elbert of deliberatively selecting them to inconvenience him and the territorial government. Cummings selected a better office and when he moved, took the Great Seal of the Territory which was used to affix public documents. Elbert demanded the return of the seal since it was his official duty to use the seal. Cummings accused Elbert of attempting to use the seal to illegally reverse the 1864 vote to reject Colorado statehood and break up the territorial government. Pro statehood newspapers such as the Rocky Mountain News took up Elbert's cause and published negative stories about Cummings including his past record with the War Department. The feud escalated to Cummings' superior, U.S. Secretary of State William H. Seward and prompted the resignation of Elbert.

Cummings encouraged investment in mining and the development of railroads.

In 1866 the Territory of Colorado held an election for the delegate to congress with inconclusive results. George M. Chilcott was sworn in after being nominated by the leading republic party in the territory and the canvassing board certifying that he won the majority of the votes. However, Governor Alexander Cummings denied the authority the of board and declared Alexander Cameron Hunt the winner.

Another bill for Colorado statehood was entered into the Congress in December 1866 and was debated in January 1867. The Congress was going to reject the bill as it still did not allow African Americans the right to vote. Congress passed the bill when the bill was re-written allowing the right to vote to African Americans but it was again vetoed by President Johnson claiming that controversial census results did not meet the requirement for congressional representation and a state legislature resolution rejected statehood.

In January 1867, the Colorado territorial legislature passed a law forbidding African Americans from serving on juries. Cummings vetoed the bill but the legislature overrode the veto. Cummings political enemies launched a campaign to discredit him and accused him of paying his daughter for work not performed and for grossly overpaying for the shipment of goods for the Department of Indian Affairs.

Cummings resigned as territorial governor on April 27, 1867 upon learning that President Andrew Johnson had appointed Hunt to succeed him.

Cummings was appointed collector of internal revenue for the Fourth District of Pennsylvania by President Johnson. He was nominated for Commissioner of Internal Revenue but was not confirmed by the Senate. The end of President Johnson's term in 1869 briefly ended Cummings political connections. He may have studied law and published a revised version of a law book where he refers to himself as a "Counsellor of Law". With the election of Rutherford B. Hayes to the presidency, Cummings was appointed as U.S. Consul to the Kingdom of Hawaii.

Cummings died in Ottawa, Ontario, Canada, in 1879 while conducting consular activities and was interred in an unmarked grave in Laurel Hill Cemetery in Philadelphia, Pennsylvania. A simple governmental issue tombstone currently marks his grave.

== See also ==
- History of Colorado
- Law and Government of Colorado

== Sources ==
- Ferrill, Will C. (1918). Sketches of Colorado. The S.J. Clarke Publishing Company.
- Hanchett, William (April 1957). ""His Turbulent Excellency," Alexander Cummings, Governor of Colorado Territory, 1865-1867" (PDF). The Colorado Magazine. XXXIV (2): 81–104.
- Stone, Wilbur Fisk (1911). History of Colorado. The Western Press Bureau Company.
