= Hiram Pitt Bennet =

American politician (1826–1914)

Hiram P. Bennet
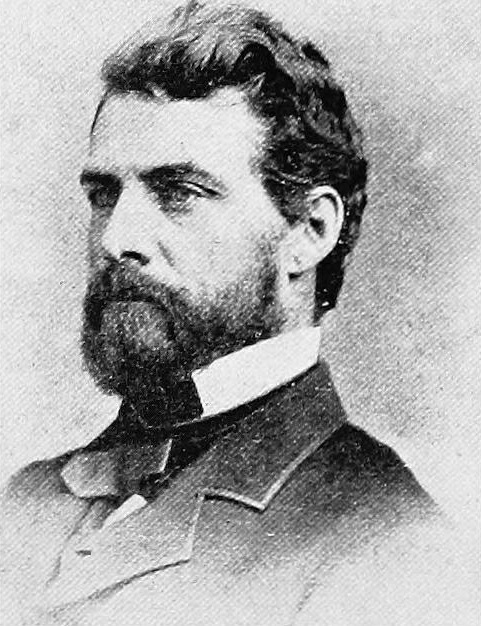
- From Volume I of 1907's Illustrated History of Nebraska

5th Speaker of the Nebraska Territorial House of Representatives
- In office September 21, 1858 – November 4, 1858
- Preceded by: James H. Decker
- Succeeded by: Silas A. Strickland

Personal details
- Born: September 2, 1826 Carthage, Maine
- Died: November 11, 1914 (aged 88) Denver, Colorado
- Occupation: Politician

Hiram Pitt Bennet (September 2, 1826 – November 11, 1914) was a Congressional delegate from the Territory of Colorado and Colorado Secretary of State.

== Biography ==
Bennet was born in Carthage, Maine, and moved to Ohio with his parents, who settled in Richland County in 1831. He attended public and private schools in Ohio. Bennet attended the Ohio Wesleyan University in Delaware, Ohio, before taking a teaching job in northwestern Missouri in 1850. He studied law and was admitted to the bar in 1851, practicing in western Iowa and later in Glenwood, Iowa. He served as judge of the circuit court of Iowa in 1852.

Bennet moved to the Nebraska Territory in 1854, settled in Nebraska City, and continued the practice of law. He unsuccessfully contested in 1855 as a Republican the election of Bird B. Chapman to the Thirty-fourth Congress. He served as a member of the Territorial council in 1856, and as a member of the Territorial House of Representatives in 1858, where he served as speaker. Bennet moved to Denver, Colorado in 1859 and continued the practice of law.

== Career ==
Upon the admission of the Territory to representation, Bennet was elected as a Conservative Republican, a Delegate to the Thirty-seventh Congress. He was the first Territorial Representative for Colorado in 1862. He was reelected to the Thirty-eighth Congress and served from August 19, 1861, to March 3, 1865. He was not a candidate for renomination in 1864. Bennet played an important role in obtaining statehood for Colorado, introducing the first bill on statehood in 1863.

Bennet served as Secretary of State of Colorado in 1867. He was appointed postmaster of Denver, Colorado, on March 26, 1869, and served until May 27, 1874, when a successor was appointed. Bennet served as a member of the first State senate in 1876. He was appointed "State Agent" in 1888 and served until 1895, recovering lands belonging to the State of Colorado which had been wrongfully disposed of.

== Death and legacy ==
Bennet retired in 1899 and resided in Denver, Colorado, until his death, November 11, 1914. He is interred in Riverside Cemetery.

The town of Bennett, Colorado was named for Bennet.

U.S. House of Representatives
Preceded by office created	Delegate to the U.S. House of Representatives from Colorado; 1861–1865	Succeeded by Allen A. Bradford
