= Allen Bradford =

Allen Bradford may refer to:

- Allen Alexander Bradford (1815–1888), Delegate from the Territory of Colorado
- Allen Bradford (American football) (born 1988), American football linebacker
