= Allen Alexander Bradford =

American politician & judge (1815–1888)

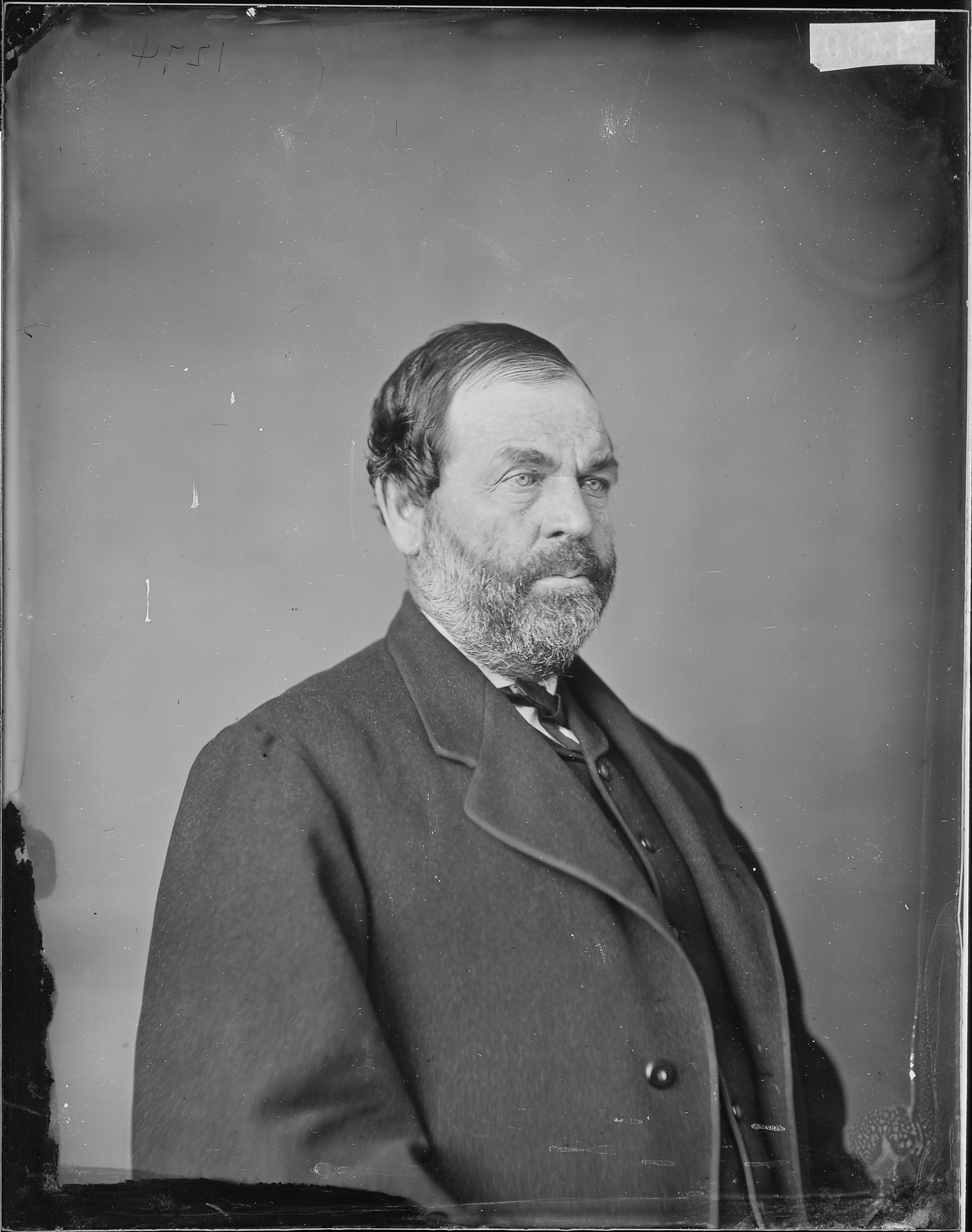
- Mathew Brady Gallery photo, circa 1865

Delegate to the United States House of Representatives
- In office March 4, 1869 – March 3, 1871
- Preceded by: George Miles Chilcott
- Succeeded by: Jerome Bunty Chaffee
- Constituency: Colorado Territory's at-large congressional district
- In office March 4, 1865 – March 3, 1867
- Preceded by: Hiram Pitt Bennet
- Succeeded by: George Miles Chilcott

Justice of the Colorado Territorial Supreme Court
- In office June 6, 1862 – March 3, 1865 Serving with Charles Lee Armour, Benjamin F. Hall (chief judge), Stephen S. Harding (chief judge)
- Preceded by: Solomon Newton Pettis
- Succeeded by: Charles Frederick Holly, William H. Gale
- Constituency: Colorado Territory

Personal details
- Born: July 23, 1815 Friendship, Maine, U.S.
- Died: March 12, 1888 (aged 72) Pueblo, Colorado, U.S.
- Resting place: City Cemetery, Pueblo, Colorado, U.S.
- Party: Republican
- Spouse: Emeline Cowles (m. 1849)
- Children: 2
- Profession: Attorney

Allen Alexander Bradford (July 23, 1815 – March 12, 1888) was an American attorney, judge, and politician from Colorado. A Republican, he served as Associate Judge of the United States District Court for Colorado Territory from 1862 to 1865 and Territorial Delegate from Colorado Territory from 1865 to 1867 and 1869 to 1871.

A native of Friendship, Maine, Bradford taught school while studying law, attained admission to the bar and practiced. He served as clerk of the circuit court of Atchison County, Missouri, from 1845 to 1851, then moved to Iowa, where he was judge of the sixth judicial district from 1852 to 1855. He then moved to Nebraska Territory, where he served as a member of the territorial house of representatives from 1856 to 1858. In 1860, he moved to Colorado Territory, where he was appointed judge of the territory's supreme court by President Abraham Lincoln on June 6, 1862.

Bradford was elected territorial delegate in 1864 and served in the 39th Congress, March 4, 1865, to March 3, 1867. After his term, he resumed the practice of law in Pueblo, Colorado. In 1868, he was again elected as territorial delegate, and he served in the 41st Congress, (March 4, 1869, to March 3, 1871. After leaving Congress, Bradford practiced law in Pueblo. He died in Pueblo on March 12, 1888. He was buried at City Cemetery in Pueblo.

== Early life ==
Allen A. Bradford was born in Friendship, Maine, on July 23, 1815, a son of Cornelius Bradford and Hannah (Gay) Bradford. He was raised on his family's farm, attended the local schools, and was a student at several academies in the Camden, Maine, area. After completing his education, he taught school while studying law in the Thomaston, Maine, office of Jonathan Cilley.

In 1841, Bradford moved to Atchison County, Missouri, where he continued to teach school and study law. He attained admission to the bar in 1845 and practiced in Atchison County. From 1845 to 1850, Bradford served as clerk of the Missouri Circuit Court for Atchison County. In 1850, he made a California Gold Rush trip to the West Coast, but decided not to remain, and he returned to Missouri in 1851. Later that year he moved to Sidney, Iowa, where he continued to practice law. From 1852 to 1855, he served as judge of Iowa's 6th District Court.

== Continued career ==
In 1855, Bradford moved to Nebraska City, Nebraska Territory, where he continued practicing law. He was soon elected to the territorial legislature, and he served in the second, third, and fourth sessions, 1856, 1857, and 1858. In 1860, he moved to Central City, Colorado Territory, where he resumed practicing law. In 1862, he was appointed to the territory's supreme court, and he moved to Pueblo. Bradford remained on the bench until 1865, when he resigned to take his seat in Congress.

In 1864, Bradford was elected as Colorado's territorial delegate to the United States House of Representatives, and he served one term, March 4, 1865, to March 3, 1867. He was not a candidate for reelection in 1866 and resumed practicing law in Pueblo. In 1868, he was again elected to Congress, and he served as Colorado's delegate from March 4, 1869, to March 3, 1871. After completing his second term, Bradford returned to Pueblo to practice law. From 1871 to 1881, he served as county attorney of Pueblo County.

Bradford died in Pueblo on March 13, 1888. He was buried at City Cemetery in Pueblo.

U.S. House of Representatives
Preceded by Hiram P. Bennet	Delegate to the U.S. House of Representatives from Colorado; 1865–1867	Succeeded by George M. Chilcott
Preceded by George M. Chilcott	Delegate to the U.S. House of Representatives from Colorado; 1869–1871	Succeeded by Jerome B. Chaffee
