= Henry M. Teller =

American politician (1830–1914)

Henry Teller
- Portrait by Harris & Ewing c. 1905–1909

United States Senator from Colorado
- In office March 4, 1885 – March 3, 1909
- Preceded by: Nathaniel P. Hill
- Succeeded by: Charles J. Hughes Jr.
- In office November 15, 1876 – April 17, 1882
- Preceded by: Seat established
- Succeeded by: George M. Chilcott

15th United States Secretary of the Interior
- In office April 18, 1882 – March 3, 1885
- President: Chester A. Arthur
- Preceded by: Samuel J. Kirkwood
- Succeeded by: Lucius Lamar

Personal details
- Born: May 23, 1830 Granger, New York, U.S.
- Died: February 23, 1914 (aged 83) Denver, Colorado, U.S.
- Resting place: Fairmount Cemetery
- Party: Republican (1876–1897); Silver Republican (1897–1903); Democratic (1903–1909)

Military service
- Allegiance: United States
- Branch/service: Colorado Militia
- Years of service: 1864–1867
- Rank: Major General
- Battles/wars: Colorado War

Henry Moore Teller (May 23, 1830 – February 23, 1914) was an American politician from Colorado, serving as a U.S. senator between 1876–1882 and 1885–1909, also serving as Secretary of the Interior between 1882 and 1885. He strongly opposed the Dawes Act, intended to break up communal Native American lands and force assimilation of the people, accurately stating that it was directed at forcing the Indians to give up their land so that it could be sold to white settlers. Among his most prominent achievements was authoring the Teller Amendment which definitively stated that, following the Spanish–American War, the United States would not annex Cuba, rather that the purpose of their involvement would be to help it gain independence from Spain.

== Biography ==
=== Life and early career ===
Henry Moore Teller was born into a large Methodist family on a farm in Granger, New York, in 1830. Educated at local academies when he was young, he went on to take up teaching in order to pay his way through law school. He interned in the office of Judge Martin Grover of Angelica, New York, and became a lawyer in 1858. Although was admitted to the state bar, he moved to Morrison, Illinois where he practiced law for three years and helped establish the Republican Party of Illinois. Following that, in 1861, Teller set up a law office in Central City, present-day Colorado, where he married Harriet M. Bruce and had two sons and a daughter. During that time, Teller also served as major general of Colorado militia from 1864 to 1867. In 1865, Teller was one of the chief organizers of the Colorado Central Railroad, writing its original charter and becoming its president for five years. Afterwards, until Colorado achieved statehood, Teller continued work as a corporate attorney, where he would gain enough prominence to be admitted to its upcoming Senate.

=== Politics ===
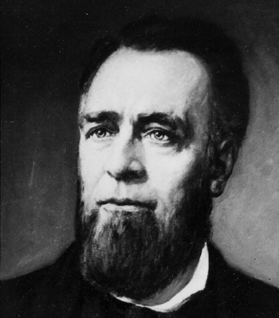
Teller earlier in his career

Following Colorado's admission to the Union in 1876, Teller was elected by state legislature to be a U.S. senator. He served a brief three-month term, and was then elected for his first full six-year term, going on to be re-elected three more times and representing Colorado in the Senate for over 25 years. In 1882, President Chester Arthur named Teller secretary of the interior after Samuel Kirkwood resigned on April 17 of that year. As interior secretary, Teller had oversight of the Bureau of Indian Affairs, and vigorously opposed the allotment of Indian lands.

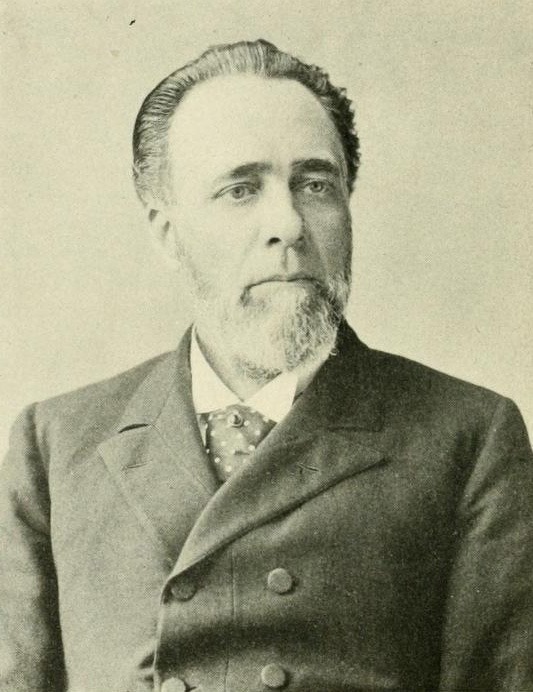
Teller c. 1899

Beginning in 1880, Teller became ardently connected with the Free Silver question, doing much in and out of Congress with tongue and pen. Teller returned to the Senate in 1885. He was instrumental in securing a declaration in favor of bimetallism, and he was a conspicuous actor in the prolonged fight in the Senate against its unconditional repeal following the 1892 Republican National Convention. The decision thus made was to keep the gold standard intact indefinitely and, in response, Teller and 24 others marched out of the 1896 Republican National Convention. As a staunch supporter of bimetallism, along with being a prominent figure, he joined the other leading Silver Republicans and became leader of the Silver Republican Party. However, as bimetallism increasingly fell out of national politics, the party lost much of its influence, and many Silver Republicans returned to the Republican Party. Unlike them, however, Teller never returned to the Republican Party.

With the decline of the Silver Republican organization, Teller served as Colorado's Democratic senator for the remainder of the time until 1909. Teller helped the Democratic Party gain more power in Colorado, which was previously dominated by Republicans.

During the Spanish–American War, Teller gained national prominence for influencing the creation of the Teller Amendment, an amendment to the Joint Resolution for the war with Spain, passed by the House and Senate on April 19, 1898.

After 33 years of service and retiring from Senate in 1909, Teller returned to practicing law in Colorado for the remainder of his life.

Teller died on February 23, 1914, and he is buried at Fairmount Cemetery in Denver.

== On foreign and domestic affairs ==
=== Native Americans ===
Teller first became implicated in Native American affairs during the "Indian troubles" in 1863, when the Arapahoe and Cheyenne people were forced off the eastern plains of Colorado. For this reason, he was appointed major general of Colorado's territorial militia in that same year, a post that he held until 1865.

Later on, Teller became one of the most outspoken opponents of the allotment of Native American land. Allotment was a process by which communal ownership of indigenous lands would be ended and the land portioned out to individual Native Americans, with the "excess" to be sold to the government. In 1881, Teller said that allotment was a policy "to despoil the Indians of their lands and to make them vagabonds on the face of the earth." Teller also said,

The real aim this bill is to get at the Indian lands and open them up to settlement. The provisions for the apparent benefit of the Indians are but the pretext to get at his lands and occupy them. ... If this were done in the name of greed, it would be bad enough; but to do it in the name of humanity, and under the cloak of an ardent desire to promote the Indian's welfare by making him lie ourselves, whether he will or not, is infinitely worse.

Teller would be proven correct. Land owned by natives decreased from 138 million acres (560,000 km^{2}) in 1887 to 48 million acres (190,000 km^{2}) in 1934.

As Secretary of the Interior with oversight over the Bureau of Indian Affairs, Teller also had a lot to do with reforming Native American schools. However, Teller's defense of indigenous land rights conflicts with his stance against traditional American Indian customs. For instance, in 1883 he approved the Indian Religious Crimes Code, codified by Commissioner of Indian Affairs Hiram Price, which sought to prohibit Native American traditional ceremonial activity throughout the United States. Customs, dances, plural marriage, and other practices were to be prosecuted by a "Court of Indian Offenses," with authority to impose penalties of up to 90 days imprisonment and withholding government rations. The intent of the Code was to eliminate traditional Native American culture on reservations, however the Five Civilized Tribes were exempt from the code. Secretary Teller installed indigenous judges to prosecute any Native Americans involved in the "immoral" dances, in addition to polygamy, and the sale of Native American wives. White missionaries, educators, and the federal government feared that the traditional dances were war dances, especially the Sun Dance by the Sioux, in which young men tested themselves in painful displays. Such suppressive measures against indigenous culture were finally repealed by Commissioner John Collier in 1934.

=== Cuba ===
One of Teller's major achievements was, during the Spanish–American War in 1898, when he greatly influenced the creation of the Teller Amendment, which expressly set forth the United States' reasons for involvement in the war. Although condemned by some for preventing U.S. annexation of Cuba, Teller believed with conviction that the goal of the United States should be to support the Cuban War of Independence for an autonomous nation. As such, Teller made this apparent in his following statement:

I never could do better than now, when the American flag has come down from Cuba, but, better still, a flag for Cuba has gone up. The American flag is the best flag in the world for Americans. It is not the best flag for men who do not want it. It is not the best flag for Cuba. Cuba's flag, not representing a hundredth part of the power or glory of ours, Is the flag for Cuba, and when the Filipinos shall put up their flag and ours shall come down, as I believe it will some day, it will be a better flag to them than ours can be, although you may administer your government with all the kindness and all the wisdom of which human beings are capable. The best flag is the flag that the men themselves put up. It is the only flag that ought to command the admiration and love and affection of the men who live under it, and it is the only flag that will. Liberty-loving men will never have any love for a flag that they do not create and that they do not defend.

With such in mind, the fourth resolution of what would come to be known collectively as the Teller Amendment echoed this resolve. Henry M. Teller would later gain national recognition for his stance in Cuban affairs, and the political atmosphere following its approval became directed towards diplomacy assuring Cuban independence. However, this would be undermined by the later Platt Amendment until its abrogation in 1934.

=== Chinese Immigration ===
Teller supported the passage of the Scott Act of 1888, a bill which further cemented the exclusion of Chinese laborers from the U.S. first legislated in the Chinese Exclusion Act of 1882. He is quoted as saying of the act, "There are now about one hundred thousand Chinese who have come into this country, and I myself will welcome any legislation that shall deport every single one of them from the United States and send them back to China, where they belong."

== See also ==
- List of United States senators who switched parties
- George Turner (U.S. politician)
- Teller Amendment
- Silver Republican Party
- Cuban War of Independence
- Spanish–American War
- Teller County, Colorado

U.S. Senate
New seat	U.S. Senator (Class 2) from Colorado; 1876–1882; Served alongside: Jerome B. Chaffee, Nathaniel P. Hill	Succeeded by George M. Chilcott
Preceded by James G. Blaine	Chair of the Senate Civil Service Committee; 1877–1879	Succeeded by Matthew Butler
Preceded by Nathaniel P. Hill	U.S. Senator (Class 3) from Colorado; 1885–1909; Served alongside: Thomas M. Bowen, Edward O. Wolcott, Thomas M. Patterson, Simon Guggenheim	Succeeded by Charles J. Hughes Jr.
Political offices
Preceded by Samuel J. Kirkwood	United States Secretary of the Interior; 1882–1885	Succeeded by Lucius Lamar
