= Teller Amendment =

Conditions on U.S. military presence in Cuba

- Long title: Joint Resolution For the recognition of the independence of the people of Cuba, demanding that the Government of Spain relinquish its authority and government in the Island of Cuba, and to withdraw its land and naval forces from Cuba and Cuban waters, and directing the President of the United States to use the land and naval forces of the United States to carry these resolutions into effect.
- Enacted by: the 55th United States Congress
- Effective: April 20, 1898

Citations
- Statutes at Large: 30 Stat. 738, Resolution 24

Legislative history
- Introduced in the House as H.J.Res. 233 by Henry M. Teller (R-CO); Passed the House on April 13, 1898 (324-19); Passed the Senate on April 16, 1898 (51-37, in lieu of S.J.Res. 149); Reported by the joint conference committee on April 18, 1898; agreed to by the House on April 18, 1898 (311-6) and by the Senate on April 18, 1898 (42-35); Signed into law by President William McKinley on April 20, 1898

The Teller Amendment was an amendment to a joint resolution of the United States Congress, enacted on April 20, 1898, in reply to President William McKinley's War Message. The amendment was introduced after the USS Maine exploded in February 1898, an event that heightened tensions occurring between the United States and Spain. This eventually led Congress to declare war on Spain in April and demand the Spanish relinquish control of Cuba. To make clear that the United States had no colonial ambitions, Congress approved an amendment proposed by Colorado Senator Henry M. Teller, affirming Cuba's right to independence. The amendment aided in placing a restriction on the United States military's presence in Cuba. Accordingly, the United States in the amendment commanded that the government of Spain expel its land and naval forces from Cuba and its waters. According to the clause, the U.S. could not annex Cuba but only leave "control of the island to its people." In simple terms, the United States would recognize the Cuban people as "free and independent." However, the United States would not depart from the country until it had helped to pacify it. In order to pacify it, they would be permitted to employ land and naval forces as necessary to complete the objective at hand. Once pacified, the United States would have relinquished authority of Cuba's government to its people.

== McKinley's war message ==
In the political atmosphere in the U.S. growing out of the Cuban struggle for independence, and following on the February 15, 1898 the sinking of the USS Maine in Havana harbor President William McKinley, on 11 April 1898, asked the Congress,

... to authorize and empower the President to take measures to secure a full and final termination of hostilities between the government of Spain and the people of Cuba, and to ensure in the island the establishment of a stable government, capable of maintaining order and observing its international obligations, ensuring peace and tranquillity and the security of its citizens as well as our own, and to use the military and naval forces of the United States as may be necessary for these purposes.

== Congressional response ==
Congress debated a joint resolution in response to the president's request for a week. In near-final form, its three parts constituted:

[a] joint resolution for the recognition of the independence of the people of Cuba, demanding that the government of Spain relinquish its authority and government in the Island of Cuba and withdraw its land and naval forces from Cuba and Cuban waters, and directing the President of the United States to use the land and naval forces of the United States to carry these resolutions into effect.

— Congressional Record p. 4062

== The Teller Amendment ==
Senator Henry M. Teller, a Republican from Colorado proposed the amendment to ensure that the United States would not establish permanent control over Cuba following the cessation of hostilities with Spain. The Republican McKinley administration would not recognize belligerency or independence as it was unsure of the form an insurgency government might take. Without recognizing some government in Cuba, Congressmen feared McKinley was simply priming the island for annexation. The Teller clause quelled any anxiety of annexation by stating that the United States

... hereby disclaims any disposition of intention to exercise sovereignty, jurisdiction, or control over said island except for pacification thereof, and asserts its determination, when that is accomplished, to leave the government and control of the island to its people.

The proposed amendment gained support from several forces:

... those who opposed annexing territory containing large numbers of blacks and Catholics, those who sincerely supported Cuban independence, and representatives of the domestic sugar business, including sponsor Senator Henry Teller of Colorado, who feared Cuban competition.

(A significant import tariff on foreign sugar would no longer apply to Cuba if it became part of the United States.)

The Senate passed the amendment by voice vote, then passed the amended version of the resolution 42 to 35, on April 19, 1898, and the House concurred the same day, 311 to 6. President McKinley signed the joint resolution on April 20, 1898, and the ultimatum was forwarded to Spain.

This joint resolution would declare:

... First. That the people of the Island of Cuba are, and of right ought to be, free and independent.

Second. That it is the duty of the United States to demand, and the Government of the United States does hereby demand, that the Government of Spain at once relinquish its authority and government in the Island of Cuba and withdraw its land and naval forces from Cuba and Cuban waters.

Third. That the President of the United States be, and he hereby is, directed and empowered to use the entire land and naval forces of the United States, and to call into the actual service of the United States the militia of the several States, to such extent as may be necessary to carry these resolutions into effect.

Fourth. That the United States hereby disclaims any disposition or intention to exercise sovereignty, jurisdiction, or control over said Island except for the pacification thereof, and asserts its determination when that is accomplished to leave the government and control of the Island to its people.

The Spanish–American War lasted from April 25 to August 12, 1898, and it ended with the Treaty of Paris on December 10, 1898. As a result, Spain lost control over the remains of its overseas empire consisting of Cuba, Puerto Rico, the Philippine islands, Guam and other islands.

After Spanish troops left the island in December 1898, the United States occupied Cuba until 1902, and as promised in the Teller Amendment did not attempt to annex the island. However, under the Platt Amendment, crafted in 1901 by U.S. Secretary of War Elihu Root to replace the Teller Amendment, important decisions of the government of Cuba remained subject to override by the United States. This suzerainty bred resentment toward the U.S.

Some historians have questioned Teller's intentions, claiming that the real motive behind the resolution was to protect American beet sugar growers from Cuban competition. On the other hand, Teller became a leading opponent of land annexation in Cuba to grow sugar in the early 1900s, as well as President Roosevelt's plans to grant tariff preferences to Cuba in 1903.

== See also ==
- Monroe Doctrine
- Cuba–United States relations
- History of Cuba
- Sphere of influence
- Spanish–American War
- Protectorate
- Imperialism
- Platt Amendment
