= The Code of Indian Offenses =

1883 body of legislation in the United States

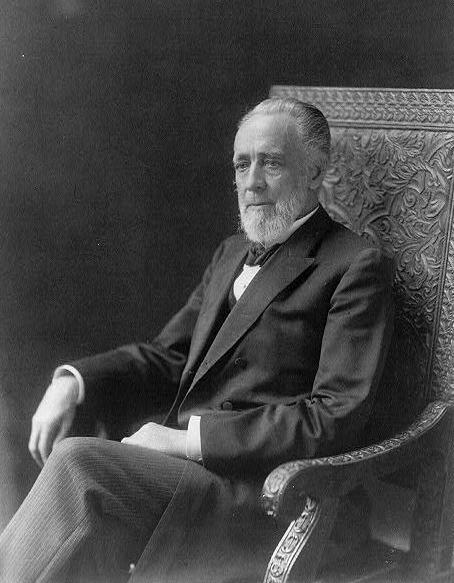
Henry Moore Teller wrote a letter to the United States Government, urging the formation of the Code of Indian Offenses

The Code of Indian Offenses was an 1883 body of legislation in the United States that, along with other legislation, prohibited the religions and cultures of Native American tribes.

A major objective of US relations with Native American tribes in the late nineteenth century was cultural assimilation. In 1883 the Code of Indian Offenses, a body of legislation with the intent of bringing tribes to a white standard of culture and religious practice, was written into law. The Code of Indian Offenses enabled the creation of the Courts of Indian Offenses, which operated under the jurisdiction of U.S. government agents assigned to reservations, allowing them to interfere in Native American criminal justice. The Code of Indian Offenses, along with other legislation, restricted the religious and cultural practices of Native American people.

Henry M. Teller, a lawyer and general of the Colorado militia, was heavily involved in Indian affairs over the course of his political career. He wrote a letter that urged the formation of the Code of Indian Offenses, in which he highlighted what he felt were worrisome aspects of the Natives and their traditions, including: religious and ceremonial dances, "medicine man" practices, plural marriage, funeral rites, giving money in marriage agreements, ritual gift-giving, and alcohol on the reservations.

== Background ==
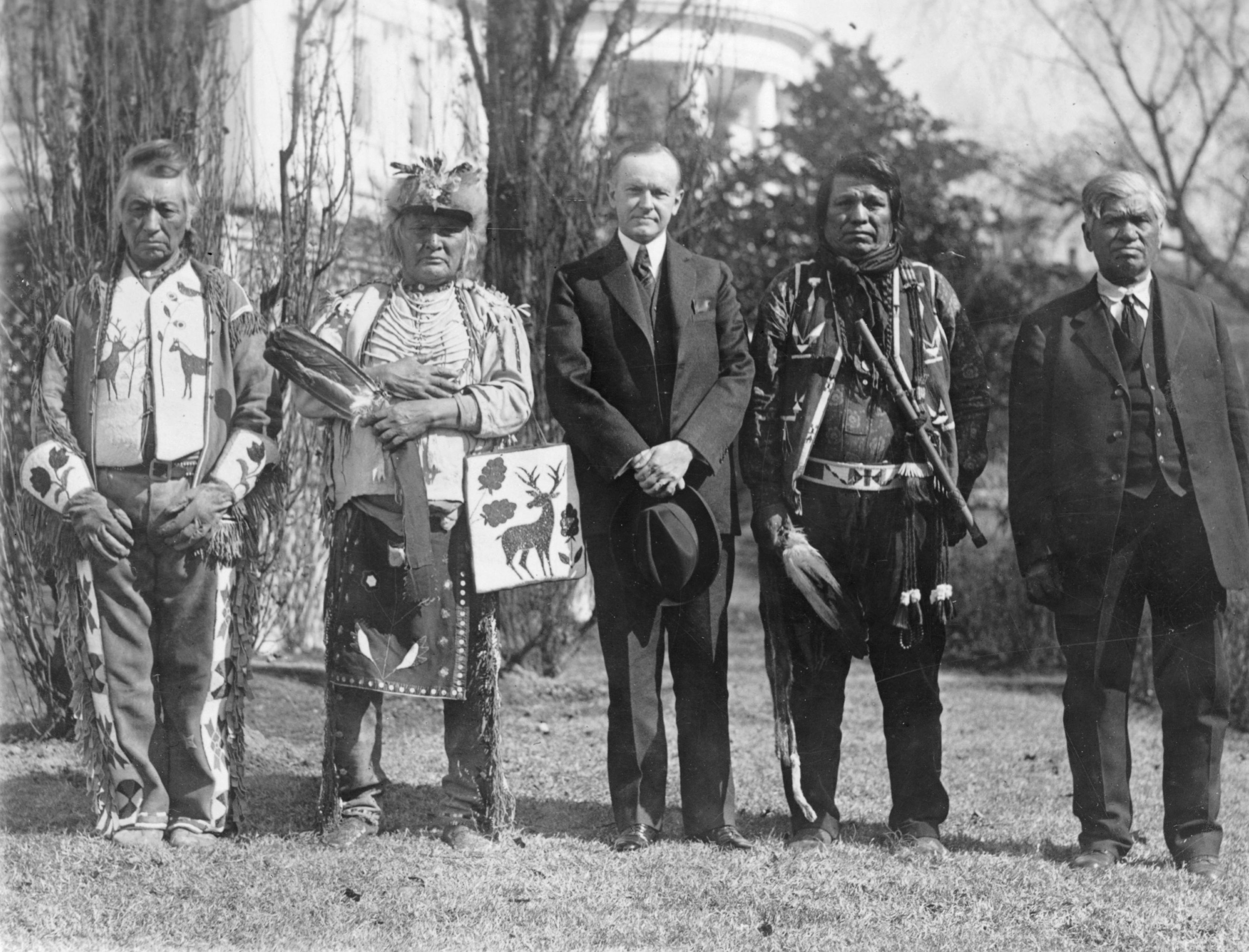
On June 2, 1924, President Calvin Coolidge signed the Indian Citizenship Act. Here, Coolidge poses with four visiting Osage leaders in front of the White House to commemorate the event.

When European colonization of the Americas began in 1492, the land was already inhabited by Native people. Each tribe had distinct cultures, languages and ways of life. Throughout the next few centuries, settlement took a drastic toll on Native Americans and their lifestyle and culture, including assimilation, genocide, and forced removals. The Native peoples suffered through diseases brought by the European settlers, and faced starvation, persecution, and war.

== Development and purposes ==
Henry M. Teller, Colorado senator and U.S. secretary of the interior, had jurisdiction over the Bureau of Indian Affairs from 1882 to 1885. During his time as secretary, he strongly opposed the Dawes Act, which intended to give the U.S. government jurisdiction over tribal land. However, he was an advocate for cultural assimilation of Native Americans, and urged the United States government to outlaw Native American traditions and rituals he referred to as "heathenish" in order to, in Teller's mind, enable them to achieve true "civilization." In 1883, Teller wrote to the Office of Indian Affairs within the Department of the Interior, naming the particular ceremonies and practices he deemed detrimental to Indian progression towards civilization. The Commissioner of Indian Affairs, Hiram Price, agreed to restrict and outlaw the practices mentioned in the letter, and the Code of Indian Offenses was written into law based on Teller's urgings.

Rather than dealing with actions generally regarded as criminal in United States society, the Code focused on criminalizing Indian culture. Some of the punishable offenses listed in the Code included: sacred dances and rituals, the practice of medicine men, polygamy, vandalism, the giving of money or gifts in exchange for a woman or daughter given in marriage, and alcohol on reservations.

=== Courts ===
In 1883 the Courts of Indian Offenses was created and funded by congress because they believed it would be more beneficial to have an Indian police than a white military keeping order. Courts of Indian Offenses were organized with the purported goal to keep order on the reservations. They originally included tribal members who were picked by U.S. government's superintendent of reservations. About two thirds of all Indian reservations had such courts.. Another purpose for the Courts were to promote Native assimilation, including the adoption of the white practice of permanently settling on land allotments. Indirectly, such settlement would result in “unused” —unallocated— land that had been held collectively by the tribes under previous treaties to be released for white settlement.

The Code of Indian Offenses ordered a tribunal of three tribal members to be established at all tribal agencies except for those of the Five Civilized Tribes. The three individuals that made up the court were each to be considered a "Judge of Indian Offenses," and they were to be appointed to the position by the commissioner of Indian affairs. No active polygamists could be a judge and the judges were to receive no compensation for their work. All actions made by the Courts of Indian Offenses were subject to approval by the tribal agent, including verdicts, the meeting time and place of court sessions, whether the courts could meet to hear a certain case, and more. The agent was also authorized to compel the attendance of witnesses at court sessions and to enforce court decisions. The Courts of Indian Offenses also had jurisdiction over misdemeanors and civil suits.

=== Sacred rites and ceremonies ===
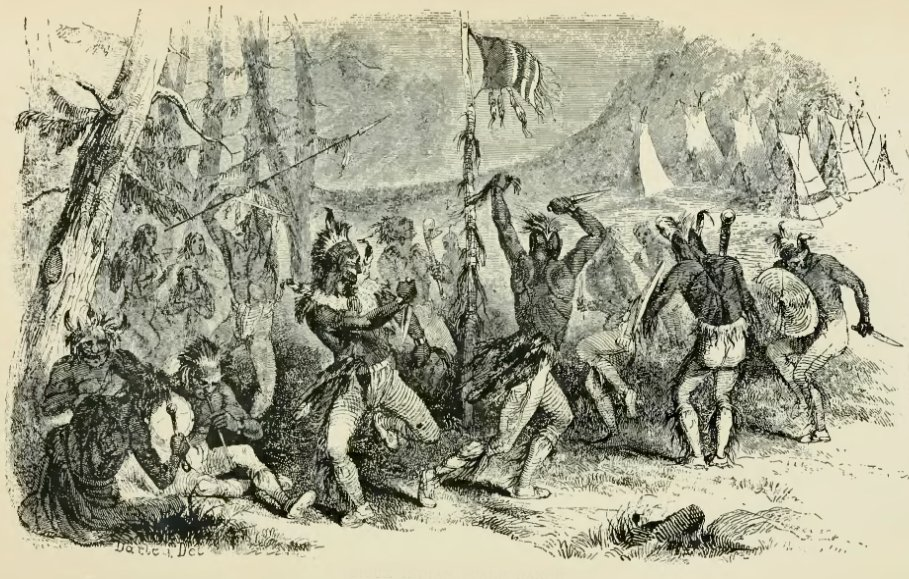
Depiction of the Sioux performing the Scalp-Dance, 1903

Sacred rites and ceremonies were Teller's main concern when he introduced the Code of Indian Offenses. Sacred dances and rituals, including those identified by Teller such as the sun-dance and scalp-dance, were said to interfere with the assimilation of Native Americans. These were ways for the people to praise and document their accomplishments. Despite the many cultural and tribal significances these dances and feasts had for the Natives, Teller believed—and convinced the government—that the only thing that would come from these dances, rituals, and feasts would be young Natives set to follow the "wicked conduct" of their brothers and fathers. He assumed that the desire for recognition among their tribes would overpower any sense of white morals they had accumulated or been taught, and therefore he felt the need to eradicate anything that may lead to this scenario. At Teller's urging, these dances were outlawed under the Code of Indian Offenses. Those found in violation of this policy were to have government rations withheld for up to ten days, and second-time offenders could have their rations withheld for at least fifteen days (but no more than thirty), or could be incarcerated for up to 30 days.

=== Plural marriage ===
Some Native cultures practiced polygamy. Originally, both federal and state governments respected the Native's choices regarding marriage and polygamy. As long as these marriage practices were performed on Native territory, or reservations, they were considered valid and free of government interference.

According to Teller, however, Native marital practices were of a high concern and needed to be addressed. He believed that Native people did not value marriage in the same way European-American cultures did, and therefore according to the Code, plural marriage must cease. He did recognize that the government should not disrupt the polygamous marriages that existed prior to this Code, but rather any future marriage in this matter should be discouraged from happening. Violations of this policy were punishable by a fine up to $20, hard labor for twenty days, or both. Those who continued in plural marriages would forfeit all rights to government rations.

Also included in this section of the Code of Indian Offenses was legislation authorizing Courts of Indian Offenses to enforce support of wife or wives and children of Indian men. Teller believed that Native marriages were too easily dissolved, and that those who divorced their wives tended to leave them helpless. Rations could be withheld from men who fail to support their families, monetarily and otherwise, until it was proven that they were once again providing satisfactory support.

=== Practices of traditional medicine ===
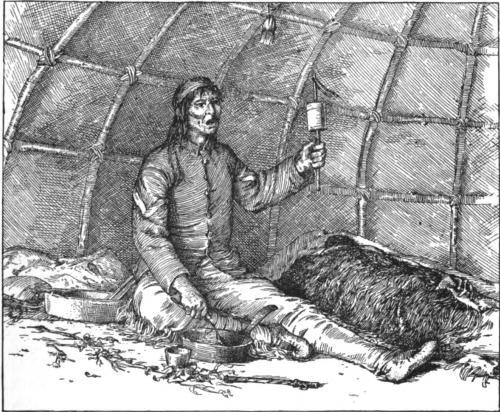
An Ojibwe midew preparing herbal medicine

A medicine man or woman is a traditional healer of the Native American tribes. In some cultures, such as those of the Pacific coast, they were called "tlaquillaughs," defined to include having supernatural gifts. In addition to being a traditional healer, they are also considered spiritual healers who often have more advanced powers, including supernatural gifts. Some cultures maintained that medicine men had certain powers that allowed them to converse with spirits.

Under the Code of Indian Offenses, all usual practices of the medicine man or women were considered unlawful. Teller claimed that the practices were simply "conjuring" and that the traditional practices of medicine men and women were proven to keep others under the wrongful influence of the medicine man, to be a hindrance to the "civilization" of the tribe, and to prevent Indians from abandoning the sacred rites and ceremonies that were so problematic to Teller. Violations of this policy were punishable by confinement in the agency prison for at least ten days, or until the Court of Indian Offenses was satisfied that the medicine man or woman would forever abandon all such practices.

=== Funeral practices ===
Certain tribes will burn the possessions of the deceased in funeral ceremonies. Some cultures believe the dead are sometimes resentful of the living and will haunt those who use their possessions after they die. Teller, not understanding Native ritual practices, claimed that stealing and vandalism were part of Native American funeral rites, and that mourners stole or destroyed the property of the deceased. Teller believed that a vital part of the "civilization" process was property ownership and thus claimed that he had it on "reliable authority" that this would leave a head of household discouraged and unwilling to put any more effort into being a property owner. Thus, stealing and vandalizing were both included in the Code of Indian Offenses, and those who stole or vandalized property could be compelled to return property or provide compensation for stolen and destroyed property.

=== Gift-giving ===
Some Native American tribes exchanged gifts to legitimize marriages. It is not specified why the exchange of money or gifts in exchange for women or girls given in marriage or cohabitation was outlawed in the Code of Indian Offenses. Teller's letter did not include concerns related to this tradition. Regardless, this practice was outlawed in the Code, and upon conviction, both parties would forfeit all rights to government rations for period up to the discretion of agent or would be imprisoned for a period not exceeding sixty days. This is also the only time white men are included in the Code of Indian Offenses; white men guilty of this offense were to be banned from the reservation permanently.

Another form of "gift-giving," among many others, that was outlawed by The Code of Indian Offenses were Potlaches. This was a "religious" ceremony and was considered a gift-giving feast of sorts. A funeral Potlach starts when a tribe member has passed away and ends the night of the funeral itself. This is made up of a gift-giving ceremony, in which tribe members will honor the tribe from which the deceased member was from. Likewise, the memorial Potlach is a planned event, in which a person privately prepares the event to honor the past deceased, and then as the date draws near he will announce it to the people.

=== Alcohol on reservations ===
Although not enforced outside of Indian reservations at the time, alcohol was strictly forbidden on reservations. The sale of, purchase of, ingestion, and any other means of consumption of, or exchange of. alcoholic products was outlawed. This was a policy included in the Code of Indian Offenses, but alcohol sale and consumption had been regulated among American Indians since at least 1802. This, in part, was due to many cultural misconceptions, such as the "drunk Indian" stereotype or the idea that alcohol affected Native American individuals differently than it did white individuals. Under the Code of Indian Offenses, alcohol sale or consumption on reservations was punishable by imprisonment for at least thirty days but not exceeding ninety days.

=== Religious freedom ===
Religion is one of the most important aspects of Native American Culture. But some practices, particularly those honoring the unity of Native people with each other and their environment, were at odds with the more anthropocentric Western European perspective. The distinction between the sacred and the secular largely did not exist in Native American culture. But because of this cultural misunderstanding, certain traditional practices and ceremonies (which varied from tribe to tribe but included rites listed by Teller as the "sun-dance," "scalp-dance," and "war-dance") and the practices of traditional medicine men were seen by him as obstacles to Indian "civilization" and were banned under the Code of Indian Offenses.

== Resistance ==
Tribal leaders chose to fight for their cultural liberties. Some attempted to protect their sacred traditions by categorizing some rituals as religious ceremonies, hoping for First Amendment protection. Others misdirected reservation agents by claiming they were engaging in harmless social gatherings or were celebrating holidays such as the Fourth of July.

Some tribes were allowed to continue practicing sacred rites if they altered them to be more closely aligned with American Christianity. A letter written to the US government by Pawnee tribe leadership asserted that the tribe had found “the white man's Christ” through the traditional Ghost Dance and argued that the Ghost Dance was bringing about the reformation of Indian culture that the United States was imposing. Misinterpretation of this messianic practice as a militaristic uprising eventually escalated to a full-scale conflict, climaxing in the Wounded Knee massacre of 1890, and some historians theorize that this event is what catalyzed the death of Native American culture in the American mind.

== Constitutionality ==
In essence, the Code of Indian Offenses did not allow Native Americans to freely practice their traditional religions. Such discrimination would be considered unconstitutional under the First Amendment if Native Americans were considered United States citizens, however, the rights and privileges held by citizens of the United States were not granted to Native Americans until 1924. In addition to this, the vast majority of white Americans considered the First Amendment to apply only to Christianity, which is why little protest was raised in response to the unconstitutional legislation; to them, “religious freedom” simply meant that Native American tribes were free to join whichever Christian sect they deemed best.

In 1978, the American Indian Religious Freedom Act (AIRFA) was enacted to return basic civil liberties to Native Americans, Inuit, Aleuts, and Native Hawaiians, and to allow them to practice, protect, and preserve their inherent right of freedom to believe, express, and exercise their traditional religious rites, spiritual and cultural practices. These rights include, but are not limited to, access to sacred sites, freedom to worship through traditional ceremonial rites, and the possession and use of objects traditionally considered sacred by their respective cultures. Even under the act, however, tribes did not have the First Amendment rights for certain religious practices, notably, the sacramental use of peyote. This was upheld in the 1990 case Employment Division v. Smith which held that the First Amendment does not protect the sacramental ingestion of peyote in Native American religious ceremonies from criminal sanctions. However, this was later remedied with the Religious Freedom Restoration Act which Congress enacted in 1993. In another court case, Ortley v. Ross, the Nebraska Supreme Court ruled in favor of the validity of polygamous marriage for Native Americans who had already been so married.
