= Alexander Cameron Hunt =

American politician (1825–1894)

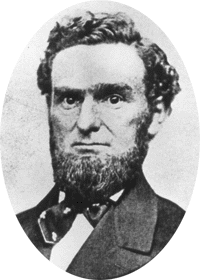

4th Governor of the Territory of Colorado
- In office May 8,1867 – April 19,1869
- Preceded by: Alexander Cummings
- Succeeded by: Edward M. McCook

Personal details
- Born: December 23, 1825 New York, New York
- Died: May 14, 1894 (aged 68) Washington, DC
- Resting place: Congressional Cemetery
- Party: Republican Party (United States)
- Spouse: Ellen Elizabeth Kellogg Hunt (m.1854)
- Children: 3

Alexander Cameron Hunt (December 23, 1825 – May 14, 1894) was the fourth governor of the Territory of Colorado, serving from 1867 to 1869 as a member of the Republican Party.

Hunt was born in New York, New York, on January 12, 1825. Soon after his birth his family moved to Freeport, Illinois, where he grew up and later served as mayor. Hunt traveled to California in 1850 to join the California Gold Rush and to the Pike's Peak Country in 1858 to join the Pike's Peak Gold Rush. He established a ranch which was later converted into Fort Weld. Hunt was chosen as the judge of Denver's Vigilante Committee. By 1860, he was an official of the Auraria Town Company. As a company leader, he presided over the meeting to combine Auraria and Denver. In 1861, Hunt was appointed U.S. Marshal for the new Territory of Colorado. At the start of the American Civil War, Hunt was part of the committee to plan the defense of Denver. Following the war, Hunt led the anti-statehood movement in the territory.

In 1866 the Territory of Colorado held an election for the delegate to congress with inconclusive results. George M. Chilcott was sworn in after being nominated by the leading republic party in the territory and the canvassing board certifying that he won the majority of the votes. However, Governor Alexander Cummings denied the authority the of board and declared Alexander Cameron Hunt the winner.

U.S. President Andrew Johnson appointed Hunt as the new governor of the Territory of Colorado on April 24, 1867. As Governor he organized a meeting between Ouray and Johnson. The meeting culminated in a treaty in which the Uintah Ute had to leave Colorado and all Ute tribes ceded their favorite hunting ground in Middle Park. When gold and silver was found in the remaining lands, the United States abandoned the treaty. While Hunt was traveling, he appointed Frank Hall to act in his place. Hunt served as the territorial governor until June 14, 1869 when new president Ulysses S. Grant appointed Edward Moody McCook to replace him. McCook was a longtime friend of Grant and had resigned the position of delegate to Hawaii to return to Washington, DC to lobby for the governorship of Colorado.

Hunt was married to Ellen Elizabeth Kellogg, who died in Colorado in 1880. Their son Albert Cameron Hunt was an electrician who invented the wigwag.

Hunt died in Washington, D.C., on May 14, 1894, and is buried in the Congressional Cemetery with his second wife, Alice (died 1920), and her parents (Judge John Curtiss Underwood and his wife, Maria) and brother.

== See also ==
- History of Colorado
- Law and government of Colorado
- List of governors of Colorado
- Territory of Colorado
