= Jerome B. Chaffee =

American politician (1825–1886)

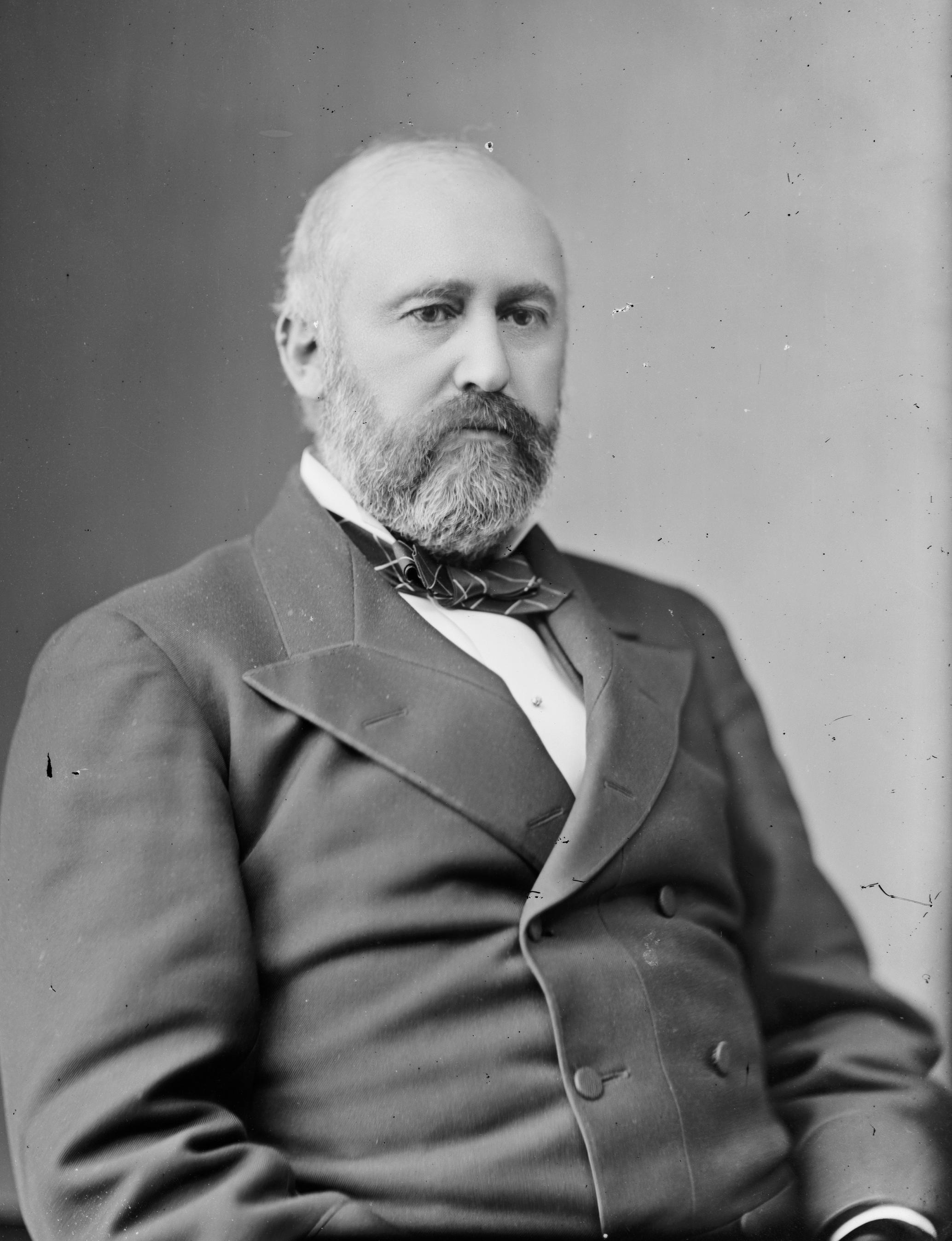

United States Senator from Colorado
- In office November 15, 1876 – March 3, 1879
- Preceded by: None
- Succeeded by: Nathaniel P. Hill

Delegate to the U.S. House of Representatives from Colorado Territory's At-large district
- In office March 4, 1871 – March 3, 1875
- Preceded by: Allen A. Bradford
- Succeeded by: Thomas M. Patterson

Personal details
- Born: April 17, 1825 Niagara County, New York
- Died: March 9, 1886 (aged 60) North Salem, New York
- Resting place: Oakwood Cemetery, Adrian, Michigan
- Party: Republican

Jerome Bunty Chaffee (April 17, 1825 – March 9, 1886) was an American entrepreneur and United States Senator from Colorado. Chaffee County, Colorado, is named after him.

== Biography ==
He was born in Cambria, New York. He moved to Adrian, Michigan in 1844 and worked as a teacher until starting a dry goods business in the late 1840s. In 1852, he moved to St. Joseph, Missouri, and later to Elmwood, Kansas Territory where he started banking businesses and engaged in land speculation.

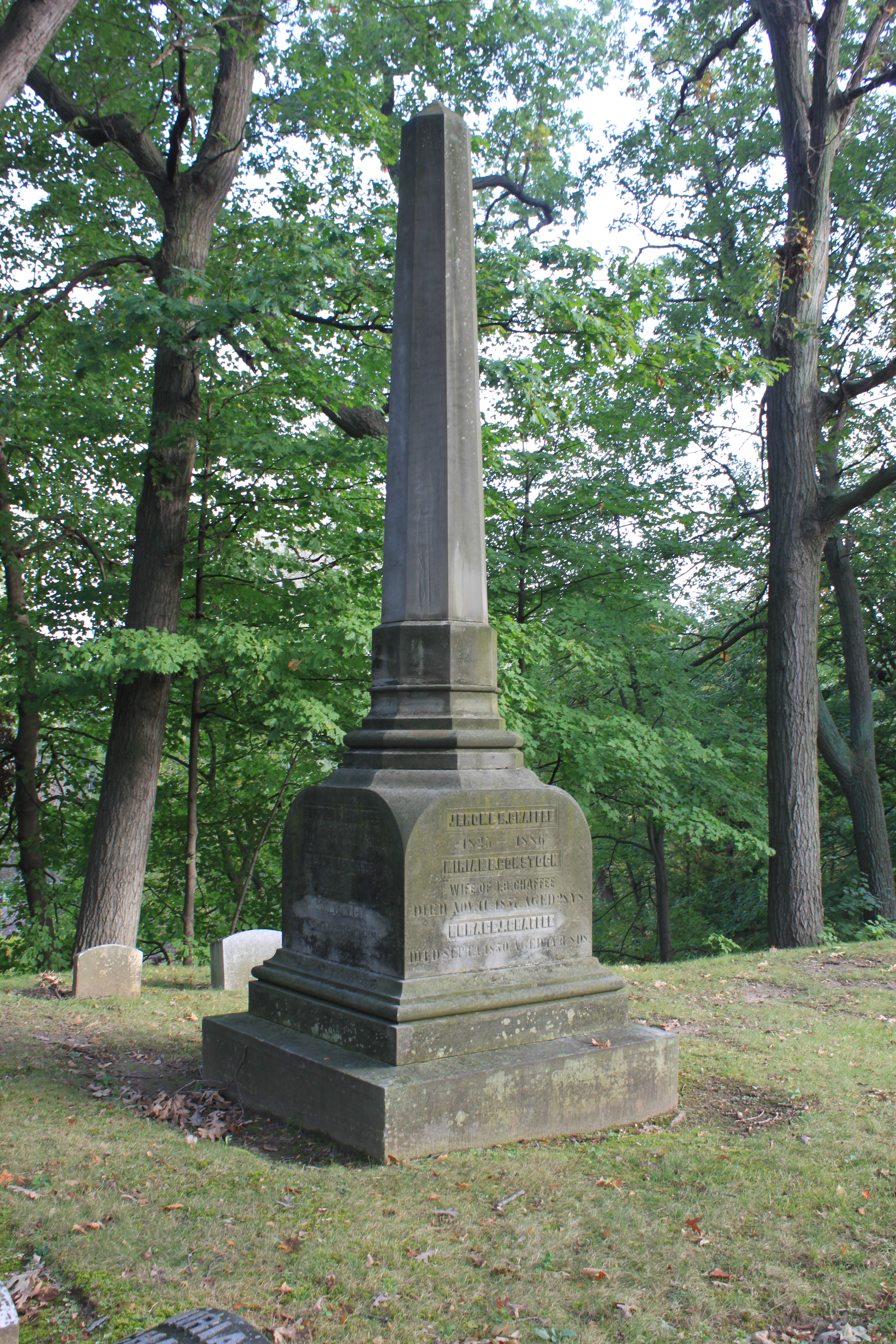
Chaffee grave

In 1860, he moved to Colorado to invest in mining. He was one of the founders of the city of Denver, Colorado, and founded the First National Bank of Denver in 1865. Chaffee entered politics and helped organize the Colorado Territory, serving in its first legislature as speaker. He was the territorial delegate to the United States Congress starting in 1870.

In 1876, after Colorado was admitted to the Union, Chaffee was elected to the United States Senate. He served for the duration of his term, until 1879, but did not seek reelection due to poor health.

In 1884, Chaffee was elected state chairman of the Colorado Republican Party.

His sole surviving child, daughter Fannie Josephine (1857–1909), married Ulysses S. Grant, Jr., a son of U.S. President Ulysses S. Grant. The couple had five children, including Ulysses S. Grant IV.

Chaffee died March 9, 1886, at the Grants' home in Salem Center, New York. He is buried in Adrian Cemetery, in Adrian, Michigan.

== Notes ==
U.S. House of Representatives
Preceded by Allen Alexander Bradford	Delegate to the U.S. House of Representatives from Colorado; 1871–1875	Succeeded by Thomas MacDonald Patterson
U.S. Senate
Preceded by none	U.S. senator (Class 3) from Colorado; 1876–1879; Served alongside: Henry M. Teller	Succeeded by Nathaniel P. Hill
