= George M. Chilcott =

American politician (1828–1891)

George Miles Chilcott
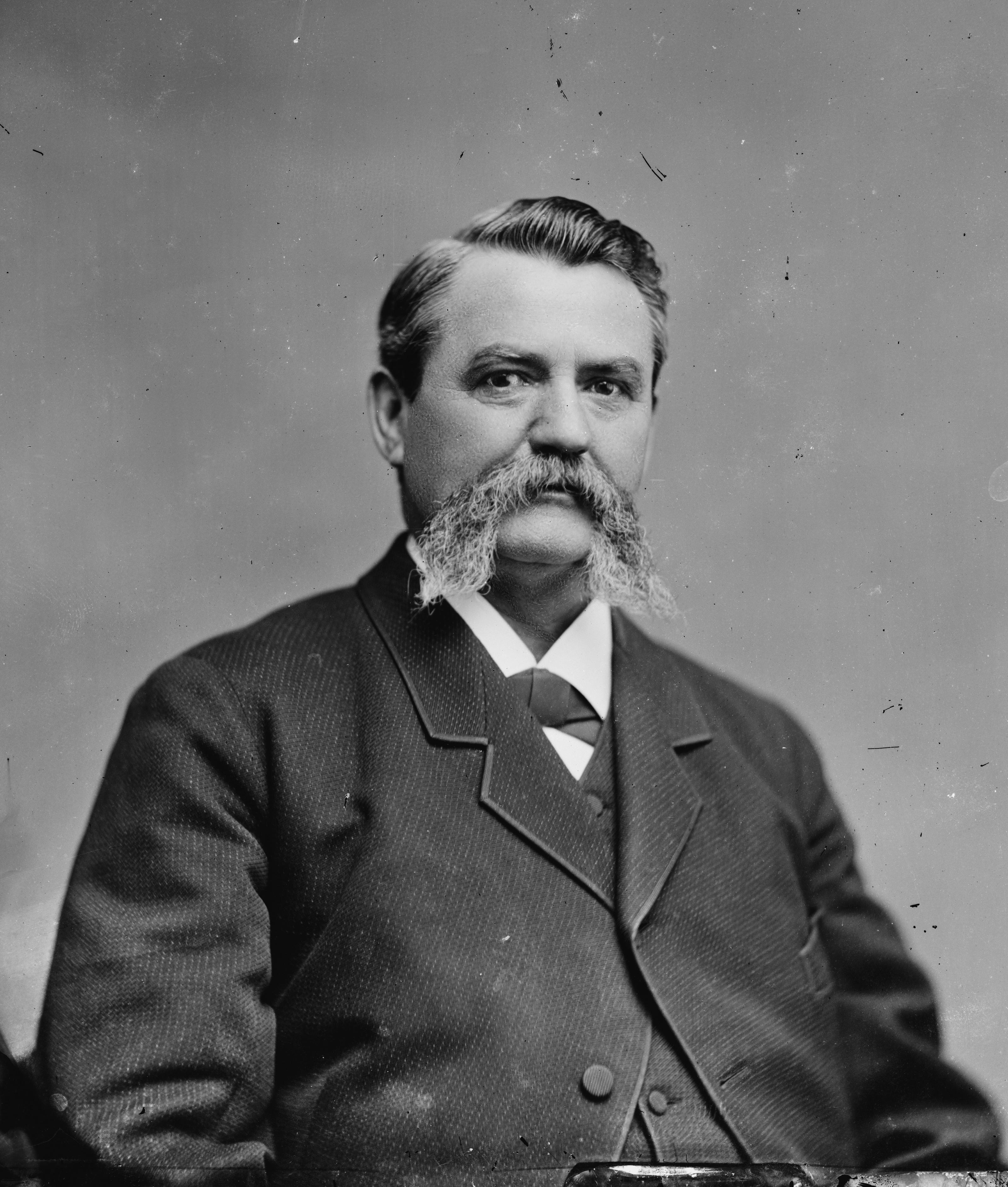

United States Senator from Colorado
- In office April 17, 1882 – January 27, 1883
- Appointed by: Frederick Walker Pitkin
- Preceded by: Henry M. Teller
- Succeeded by: Horace Tabor

Delegate to the U.S. House of Representatives from Colorado Territory's At-large district
- In office March 4, 1867 – March 3, 1869
- Preceded by: Allen A. Bradford
- Succeeded by: Allen A. Bradford

Member of the Colorado House of Representatives
- In office 1878

Personal details
- Born: January 2, 1828 Huntingdon County, Pennsylvania
- Died: March 6, 1891 (aged 63) St. Louis, Missouri
- Resting place: Masonic Cemetery, Pueblo, Colorado
- Party: Republican

George Miles Chilcott (January 2, 1828 – March 6, 1891) was a delegate to the United States House of Representatives from the Territory of Colorado, and a United States senator from the State of Colorado.

He was born in Huntingdon County, Pennsylvania near Cassville. In 1844, moved with his parents to Jefferson County, Iowa. There he studied medicine for a short time, until 1850, but adopted the life of a farmer and stock raiser. He became sheriff of Jefferson County in 1853.

He moved to the Territory of Nebraska in 1856. He was elected a member of the Nebraska Territorial Legislature from Burt County in 1856. He left the Nebraska legislature in 1859 when he moved to the Territory of Colorado.

In Colorado, he was a member of the constitutional convention and of the territorial legislature during the first two sessions, 1861-1862. He studied law and was admitted to the bar in 1863. Between 1863 and 1867, he was register of the United States Land Office for the Colorado district.

In 1865, he was elected to the U.S. House of Representatives, but was not admitted. In 1866, he was again elected, and served a term as a Republican Delegate to the Fortieth Congress. Later, he joined the Territorial council for two years, between 1872 and 1874.

Colorado was admitted as a state in 1876, and he became a member of the Colorado House of Representatives in 1878. On April 11, 1882, was appointed to the United States Senate to fill the vacancy caused by the resignation of Henry M. Teller, thus becoming part of the Forty-seventh Congress as a Republican. The term expired in 1883, and after serving the short year he retired from public service.

He died in St. Louis, Missouri on March 6, 1891. He was buried in Masonic Cemetery, Pueblo, Colorado.

== Sources ==
- Hanchett, William (April 1957). ""His Turbulent Excellency," Alexander Cummings, Governor of Colorado Territory, 1865-1867" (PDF). The Colorado Magazine. XXXIV (2): 81–104.

U.S. House of Representatives
| Preceded by Allen Alexander Bradford | Delegate to the U.S. House of Representatives from Colorado; 1867-1869 | Succeeded by Allen Alexander Bradford |
U.S. Senate
| Preceded by Henry M. Teller | U.S. senator (Class 2) from Colorado; 1882–1883; Served alongside: Nathaniel P. Hill | Succeeded by Horace A. W. Tabor |
