= Colorado Territory =

Historic region of the US, 1861 to 1876

Coordinates: 38.9972°N 105.5478°W

Territory of Colorado
- Organized incorporated territory of the United States
- 1861–1876
- Flag Coat of arms

- The Territory of Colorado as shown imposed on an 1860 map of the Nebraska, Kansas, New Mexico, and Utah Territories.
- Capital: Denver City 1861–1862; Colorado City 1862; Golden City 1862–1867; Denver (Note: Denver City changed its name to the City of Denver on February 13, 1866.) 1867–1876
- Government
  - Type: Organized incorporated territory
- History
  - Colorado Organic Act: February 28 1861
  - Statehood: August 1 1876
Preceded by
Kansas Territory
Nebraska Territory
New Mexico Territory
Utah Territory
Succeeded by
State of Colorado

The Territory of Colorado was an organized incorporated territory of the United States that existed from February 28, 1861, until August 1, 1876, when it was admitted to the Union as the 38th State of Colorado. The territory was created during the onset of the American Civil War in the wake of the Pike's Peak Gold Rush, which brought the first large concentration of settlers from the east to the region. The war stifled growth, but following the war mining grew more industrialized and fueled the economy. The construction of railroads further improved the economy. The boundaries of the newly designated Colorado Territory were very similar to those of the modern State of Colorado.

== Territorial aspirations ==
The Provisional Government of the Territory of Jefferson was an extralegal and unrecognized United States territory that existed in the Pike's Peak mining region from October 24, 1859, until it yielded to the new Territory of Colorado on June 6, 1861. The Jefferson Territory included all of the present State of Colorado and portions of the present states of Kansas, Nebraska, Utah, and Wyoming. The people were desirous of a closer government than those five territories provided.

Congressional grant of territorial status for the region was delayed by debate over the legality of chattel slavery. The deadlock was broken by the Civil War in which enough Democratic senators from seceding states resigned from the Senate to give control of both houses to the Republicans, clearing the way for admission of new territories. The State of Kansas was created on January 29, 1861 formalizing the separation of the western portion of the now defunct Kansas Territory. Three new territories were created in as many days: Colorado (February 28), Nevada (March 1), and Dakota (March 2).

Colorado Territory was officially organized by Act of Congress on February 28, 1861 (12 Stat. 172), out of lands previously part of the Kansas, Nebraska, Utah, and New Mexico territories. The name Colorado was chosen for the territory after first considering Idaho. It had been previously suggested in 1850 by Senator Henry S. Foote as a name for a state to have been created out of present-day California south of 35° 45'.

Abraham Lincoln appointed William Gilpin of Missouri the first Governor of the Territory of Colorado and he arrived in Denver City on May 29, 1861. Jefferson Territory Governor Steele, peacefully transitioned the provisional government to Gilpin's authority.

The Colorado General Assembly first met on September 9, 1861, and created 17 counties for the territory on November 1, 1861.

== Civil War ==
In 1861 following the beginning of the American Civil War, there were several small disputes and skirmishes between confederate supporters and union supporters. In August, Governor Gilpin organized the 1st Colorado Infantry. He encouraged the business of Denver to help outfit the new army on the belief that the federal government would provide funds. After racking up $375,000 in bills and failing to convince the federal government to pay out the Denver businesses the people called for a change in leadership. John P. Slough led the group to New Mexico Territory in February–March 1862. There they fought in the battles of Apache Canyon, Glorieta Pass and Peralta. Slough resigned in April 1862 and was replaced by Major John M. Chivington.

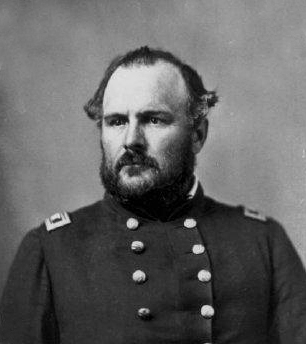
John Chivington, commander of the 3rd Colorado Cavalry at the Sand Creek Massacre.

On March 26, 1862 John Evans was appointed by Abraham Lincoln as the second governor of the territory. After Evans took the governorship, many of the debts Gilpin had incurred were paid by the federal government.

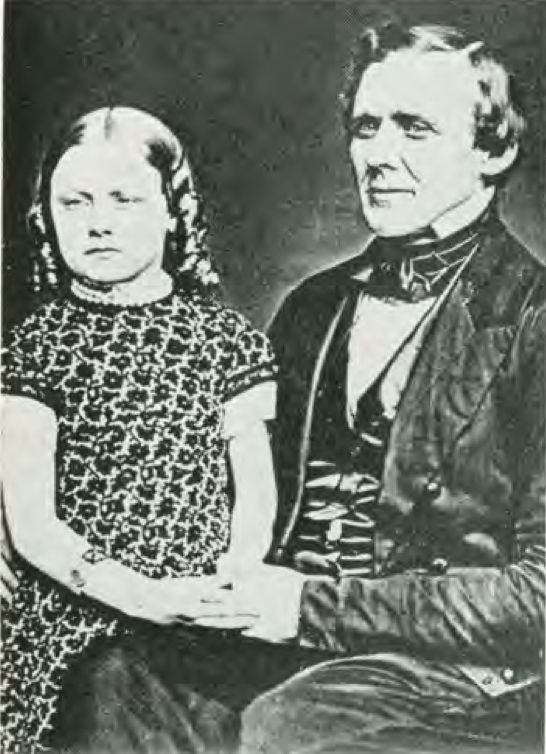
John Evans with daughter Josephine, c. 1859

Anti-native sentiment grew during the Civil War years. Exterminationist ideology, led in Colorado by Evans and Chivington, advocated for the total eradication of all native people in the territory. In response to their mistreatment, many bands of natives massacred and looted settlers and travelers around the territory. Black Kettle and Roman Nose were leaders in the hostility. Chivington committed the Sand Creek Massacre and Evans was forced to resign the following spring. During the Colorado War natives succeeded in blockade which cut off communication and severely restricted food supply. Nearly every ranch between Denver and Nebraska was burnt and its occupants raped and killed. The end of the civil war changed the nature of the white struggle against the natives because soldiers came from the east with better equipment to build forts.

== Post-war government ==
=== Alexander Cummings ===
President Andrew Johnson appointed Alexander Cummings governor of Colorado Territory on October 17, 1865. Evans still enjoyed strong support in Colorado which challenged Cummings' popularity. Cummings' term was embroiled with much drama between himself and Samuel Hitt Elbert who was Secretary of the Territory of Colorado. At the core of the drama was the statehood issue. Cummings did not immediately support statehood, and Elbert was part of the statehood faction. This issue was highly contentious and divided the people and the press in 1865. Cummings advocated for the rights of colored people, another contentious issue, but the legislature upheld a ban on suffrage outside white males and prevented public schooling for colored people. Political division between Golden and Denver grew through the 1866 election for the territorial delegate. Cummings supported Alexander Cameron Hunt to be the territorial delegate in opposition the republican nominee from Denver. Cummings denied the authority of the territorial election board, counted the results himself and declared Hunt the winner. A mob threatened to lynch Cummings and he moved to Golden. The United States Congress did not recognize anyone as the duly elected delegate for the territory. Cummings' term was plagued with allegations of political corruption which were characteristic of the reconstruction. For example, he paid his daughter, who did not live in Colorado at the time, $1,800 ($39580 inflation adjusted) for clerical work.

=== Alexander Cameron Hunt ===
Cummings resigned in April 1867 and was replaced by Hunt. Like Cummings, Hunt was an anti-statehood leader. Hunt served as governor until June 1869. His term focused on negotiation with the native tribes. While Hunt was traveling, he appointed Frank Hall to act in his place. Hall was the longest serving Secretary of the Territory of Colorado.

== Attempts at statehood ==
Many attempts were made to form a state governing the Colorado Territory. These began in the 1850s prior to the formation of Jefferson Territory and were thwarted for a variety of reasons until 1876 when Colorado became a state.

The United States Congress passed the Admission Act for the territory in late 1865, but it was vetoed by President Andrew Johnson. President Grant advocated statehood for the territory in 1870, but Congress did not act.

== Demographics ==
Historical population
Year	Pop.	±%
1860	34,277	—
1870	39,864	+16.3%
Source: 1860–1870;

The Colorado Territory began as 95% male. By 1870 it was only 62% male. However, the war and subsequent mining troubles limited population growth. The 1865 census counted 27,931 but the count was contentious with pro-statehood groups claiming the population maybe as high as 40,000. The population of 1870 was nearly the same as 1860. Prostitution was common but sometimes led to animosity between citizens and brothels. Georgetown had five brothels in 1873.

Through the Civil War, Colorado was effectively a one-party Republican territory. Following the war, a minority Democratic party formed.

== Infrastructure ==
Prior to the construction of railroads Coloradans used wagons to transport goods and messages. These began as irregular services, but starting in 1861 several regular wagon lines operated multiple days a week. Colorado's economy increased by approximately threefold from 1865 to 1871.

=== Telegraph ===
The first telegraph line out of the territory began construction in 1861 and was completed from Denver to Julesburg, Colorado in October 1863. In 1865, a telegraph line through Fort Collins, Colorado reached Salt Lake City, Utah from Denver.

=== Railroads ===
The economic boom of mining shifted the balance of power to the mining areas near Central City. In 1861, the towns planned the Colorado Central railway as a local rail network to support the mining industry. However the project was not started until 1865 and choose Golden as the hub.

In 1867, John Evans and D. H. Moffat led a capital raise to build the Denver Pacific Railroad northward to Cheyenne from Denver. In June 1870, the rail line was completed which gave Denver an economic advantage over the other Colorado towns.

In 1867, the Union Pacific Railroad laid its tracks west to Julesburg, Colorado. The Union Pacific linked up with the Central Pacific Railroad at Promontory Summit, Utah, on May 10, 1869, to form the First transcontinental railroad. The Kansas Pacific arrived two months later to forge the second line across the continent.

In 1871, William Jackson Palmer began the Denver and Rio Grande Western Railroad which connected Denver to Pueblo and beyond. He founded Colorado Springs the same year.

=== Banks ===
Only private banking was available in Colorado Territory until 1865 when First National Bank opened in Denver. Jerome B. Chaffee and David Moffat were executives at the bank.

== Mining ==
Oil was first extracted in the territory in 1861. Kerosene began to be refined in Florence, Colorado.

The mint value of gold extracted in Colorado through 1862 was $30 million ($968 million inflation adjusted). However the industry was not nearly as profitable as the miners hoped and many were unemployed. Many returned from whence they came. The territory sought to improve the industry by creating a mint in Denver. On April 21, 1862 the United States Congress authorized the construction of the Denver Mint. The Civil War's strain on the economy resulted in stagnation. Thousands left their placer mines which had quickly become unprofitable and became soldiers for $15 per month ($537 inflation adjusted).

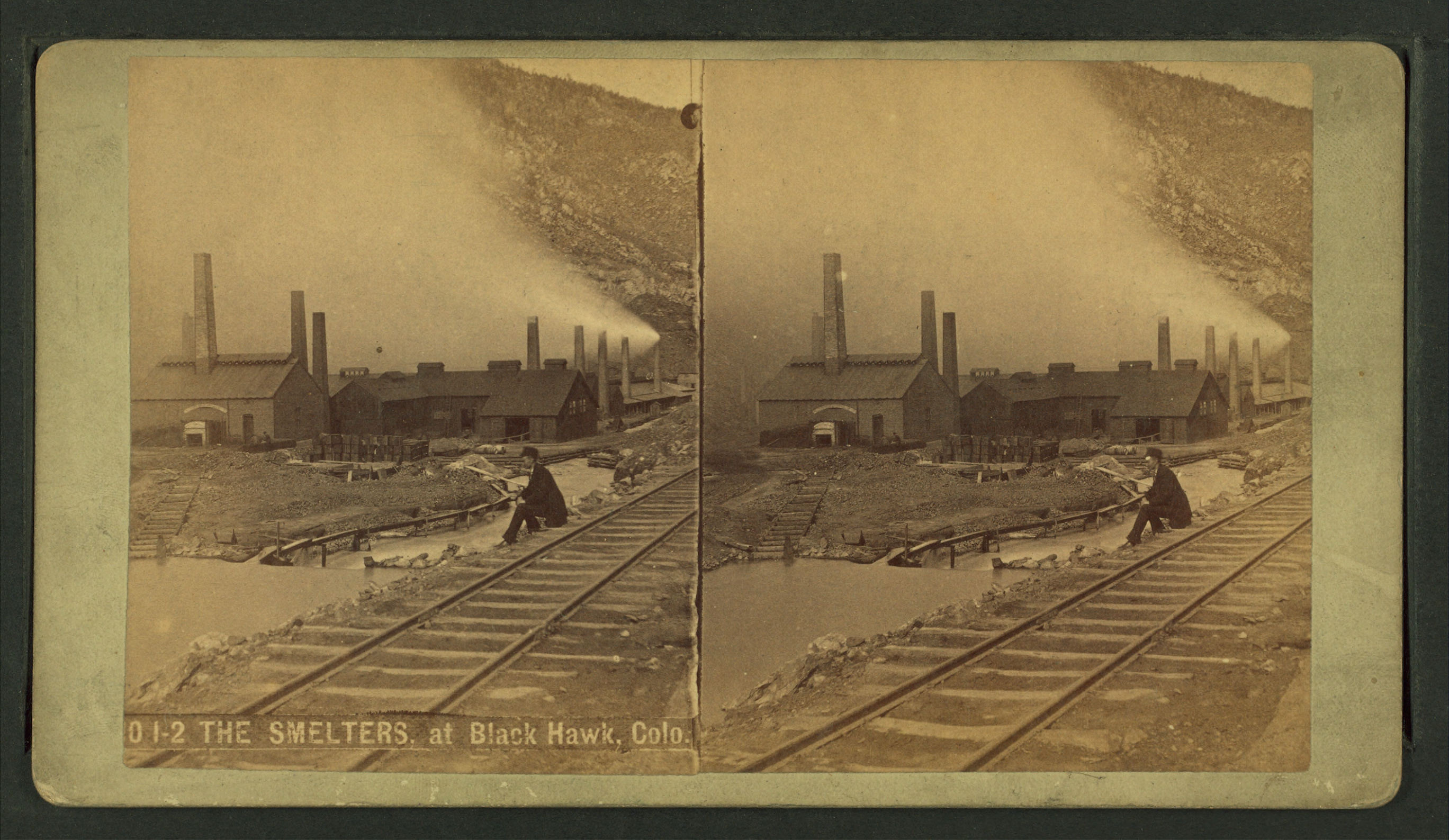
The smelter, at Black Hawk, Colo, by Weitfle, Charles, 1836-1921

In addition to legitimate mining, others staked claims and then sold the rights to these claims as speculative assets to investors on the east cost. For the claimants this was sometimes more profitable than actually mining. In 1864, news of the large investments in Colorado mines sparked an idea to pay off the federal debts incurred due to the civil war by nationalizing the mines. Naturally, the speculative miners opposed the scheme. By the end of the war, it had been settled that the mines would not be nationalized. The scare did not dampen investment as millions continued to flow into highly speculative mining companies. Some few operations turned enormous profits, but many turned into wild west stories of inept management and waste. In reality, the technology available was not sufficient turn reliable profits from gold and silver mining.

Following the Civil war, stamp mills and smelters began to be used more frequently. However these systems were highly inefficient and many went out of business. Some individuals made a living panning the waste. Labor quickly appreciated in value with some miners making $5 per day. This may have occurred due to the large number of laborers needed nationally to build railroads. By 1868, Central City was the hub of gold quartz mining with $50,000 weekly production ($1209 thousand inflation adjusted). As capital intensive production scaled up the number of miners in Colorado diminished but profits rose sharply.

Through the 1860s additional silver and iron deposits were discovered at multiple locations around Colorado. Coal began to be mined around Denver.

== Legislation ==
The territorial legislature met on a nearly annual basis. The mountain towns lead most of the legislative decisions. The only towns granted special charters were Black Hawk, Denver, Central City, and Georgetown. Gambling was common and often violent. In 1865, the legislature ensured the legality of gambling.

== Territorial capitals ==
Three Colorado cities served as the capital of the Territory of Colorado:

1. Denver City: from creation on February 28, 1861, until July 7, 1862.
2. Colorado City: July 7 until August 14, 1862.
3. Golden City: August 14, 1862 until December 9, 1867.
4. Denver: December 9, 1867 until statehood on August 1, 1876.

== See also ==
- Bibliography of Colorado
- Comanche Campaign
- Geography of Colorado
- History of Colorado
- Index of Colorado-related articles
- List of Colorado-related lists
- List of governors of the Territory of Colorado
- List of territorial claims and designations in Colorado
- Outline of Colorado
- Pike's Peak Country
- Territorial evolution of the United States

== Sources ==
- Hanchett, William (April 1957). ""His Turbulent Excellency," Alexander Cummings, Governor of Colorado Territory, 1865-1867" (PDF). The Colorado Magazine. XXXIV (2): 81–104.
- Josephy Jr., Alvin M. The Civil War in the American West. Alfred A. Knope, 1991. ISBN 0-394-56482-0
- Leonard, Stephen J.; Noel, Thomas Jacob (1990). Denver: Mining Camp to Metropolis. Niwot, Colorado: University Press of Colorado.
- Smith, Duane A. The Birth of Colorado: A Civil War Perspective. University of Oklahoma Press, 1989. ISBN 0-8061-2180-7
